= Zhu Zhixin (revolutionary) =

Chinese revolutionary (1885–1920)

- 朱執信
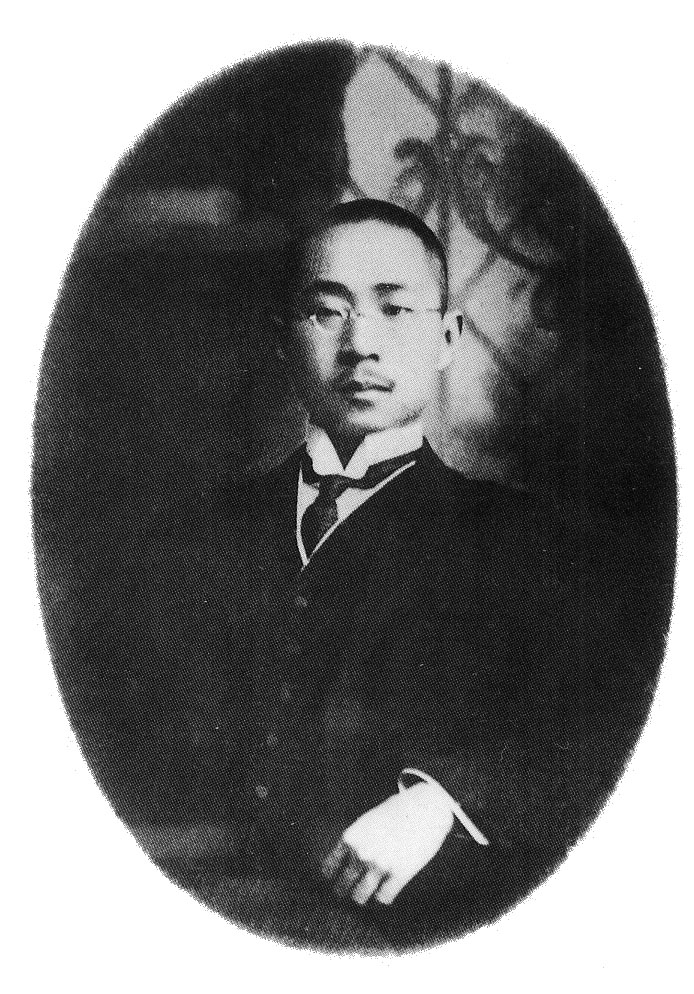
- Born: 12 October 1885; Panyu, Guangdong
- Died: 21 September 1920 (aged 34)
- Occupations: Revolutionary and author
- Known for: First Chinese translation of The Communist Manifesto

Zhu Zhixin (simplified Chinese: 朱执信; traditional Chinese: 朱執信; pinyin: Zhū Zhíxìn; Jyutping: Zyu1 Zap1 Seon3; 12 October 1885 – 21 September 1920) was a Chinese revolutionary author and close colleague of Sun Yatsen. He was a member of the Tongmenghui. Zhu made a name for himself for a series of written debates with reformist Liang Qichao, where he advocated a single land tax, revolution against the Qing dynasty, and the establishment of a Chinese republic. In 1905 he provided the first Chinese translation of Karl Marx and Friedrich Engels's The Communist Manifesto. In 1918 he decided to forgo further military affairs and follow cultural and ideological pursuits. Zhu was a gifted writer and polemicist known among other writers. Zhu and Liao Zhongkai helped Sun Yat-sen negotiate an alliance with the Soviet Union in 1920, eventually giving rise to the First United Front. After his untimely death in 1920, Wang Jingwei helped establish the Zhixin Memorial School in Guangzhou.

On 14 May 2021, asteroid 256698 Zhuzhixin, discovered by astronomers Quanzhi Ye and Hung-Chin Lin with the Lulin Sky Survey in 2008, was named by the Working Group for Small Bodies Nomenclature in his memory.
