= Wu Ta-You =

Chinese physicist and writer

- 吳大猷
- Born: 27 September 1907; Panyu, Guangzhou, China
- Died: 4 March 2000 (aged 92); Taiwan
- Education: Nankai University (BS); University of Michigan (MS, PhD)
- Scientific career
- Fields: Nuclear physics Atomic physics
- Workplaces: Peking University; National Southwestern Associated University; University of Michigan; Columbia University; University at Buffalo
- Doctoral advisor: Samuel Goudsmit
- Notable students: Zhu Guangya; Chen Ning Yang; Tsung-Dao Lee; Kun Huang

Signature
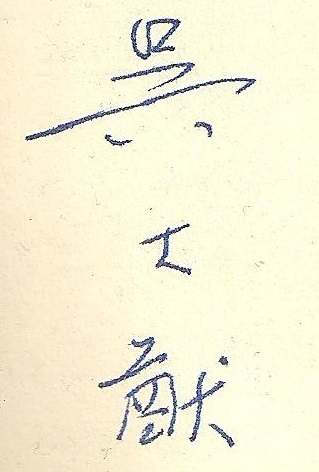

Wu Ta-You (simplified Chinese: 吴大猷; traditional Chinese: 吳大猷; pinyin: Wú Dàyóu) (27 September 1907 – 4 March 2000) was a Chinese physicist and writer who worked in the United States, Canada, China and Taiwan. He has been called the Father of Chinese physics.

== Early life and education ==
Wu was born in Panyu, Guangzhou, China. In 1929 he took his undergraduate degree at Nankai University in Tianjin (Tientsin). He moved to the United States for graduate schooling and obtained a Doctor of Philosophy degree from the University of Michigan in 1933.

== Career ==
Wu returned to China (then Republic of China) after receiving his doctorate degree, and between 1934 and 1949 he taught at various institutions there, including Peking University in Beijing, and National Southwestern Associated University in Kunming. After the communists defeated the Nationalists in the Chinese Civil War in 1949, Wu moved to Canada.

There he headed the Theoretical Physics Division of the National Research Council until 1963. In the 1960s, he was Chair of the Department of Physics and Astronomy at the University at Buffalo. After 1962, he held various positions in Taiwan (Republic of China), including the President of the Academia Sinica (1983–1994). He continued lecturing into his 90s and died on 4 March 2000.

Wu's PhD dissertation dealt with theoretical predictions of the chemical properties of the yet undiscovered transuranic elements of the actinide series, which includes such well known elements as plutonium and americium. Later in his career, he worked on solid-state physics, molecular physics, statistical physics and other areas of theoretical physics. He was known as a teacher as much as a theoretician. His many illustrious students include Chen Ning Yang and Tsung-Dao Lee, co-winners of the Nobel Prize in Physics in 1957.

Wu wrote several books, best known of which are the monograph Vibrational Spectra and Structure of Polyatomic Molecules (1939) and the graduate level textbooks Quantum Mechanics (1986) and (as co-author) Relativistic Quantum Mechanics and Quantum Fields (1991).

== Awards and honors ==
- Beginning from 2002, National Science Council of Republic of China (reformed as the Ministry of Science and Technology since 2014) gives out Wu Ta-You Memorial Award every year.
- The Department of Physics of the University at Buffalo hosts Ta-You Wu Lecture.
- The Department of Physics of the University of Michigan hosts Ta-You Wu Lecture.
- Asteroid 256892 Wutayou, discovered by astronomers Chi Sheng Lin and Ye Quanzhi in 2008, was named in his memory. The official naming citation was published by the Minor Planet Center on 17 May 2011 (M.P.C. 75106).
