= Meanings of minor-planet names: 256001–257000 =

As minor planet discoveries are confirmed, they are given a permanent number by the IAU's Minor Planet Center (MPC), and the discoverers can then submit names for them, following the IAU's naming conventions. The list below concerns those minor planets in the specified number-range that have received names, and explains the meanings of those names.

Official naming citations of newly named small Solar System bodies are approved and published in a bulletin by IAU's Working Group for Small Bodies Nomenclature (WGSBN). Before May 2021, citations were published in MPC's Minor Planet Circulars for many decades. Recent citations can also be found on the JPL Small-Body Database (SBDB). Until his death in 2016, German astronomer Lutz D. Schmadel compiled these citations into the Dictionary of Minor Planet Names (DMP) and regularly updated the collection.

Based on Paul Herget's The Names of the Minor Planets, Schmadel also researched the unclear origin of numerous asteroids, most of which had been named prior to World War II. This article incorporates text from this source, which is in the public domain: SBDB New namings may only be added to this list below after official publication as the preannouncement of names is condemned. The WGSBN publishes a comprehensive guideline for the naming rules of non-cometary small Solar System bodies.

== 256001–256100 ==
Named minor planet	Provisional	This minor planet was named for...	Ref · Catalog
There are no named minor planets in this number range

== 256101–256200 ==
back to top

Named minor planet	Provisional	This minor planet was named for...	Ref · Catalog
There are no named minor planets in this number range

== 256201–256300 ==
back to top

Named minor planet	Provisional	This minor planet was named for...	Ref · Catalog
There are no named minor planets in this number range

== 256301–256400 ==
back to top

Named minor planet	Provisional	This minor planet was named for...	Ref · Catalog
256369 Vilain	2006 YB_{3}	Christiane Vilain (born 1949), a retired researcher and teacher of physics and the history of physics	JPL · 256369
256374 Danielpequignot	2006 YZ_{13}	Daniel Pequignot (born 1945), an astronomer at Paris Observatory	JPL · 256374

== 256401–256500 ==
back to top

Named minor planet	Provisional	This minor planet was named for...	Ref · Catalog
There are no named minor planets in this number range

== 256501–256600 ==
back to top

Named minor planet	Provisional	This minor planet was named for...	Ref · Catalog
256537 Zahn	2007 GX_{4}	Jean-Paul Zahn (born 1935), a French astrophysicist, specialist in fluid dynamics and internal structure of stars	JPL · 256537
256547 Davidesmith	2007 HA_{15}	David E. Smith (born 1934), a planetary scientist and principal investigator of the Mars Global Surveyor's MOLA, the Lunar Reconnaissance Orbiter's LOLA, and MESSENGER's MLA instruments	JPL · 256547

== 256601–256700 ==
back to top

Named minor planet	Provisional	This minor planet was named for...	Ref · Catalog
256697 Nahapetov	2008 AZ_{1}	Rodion Nakhapetov (born 1944), a Ukrainian-born, Russian actor, film director, screenwriter and an awarded People's Artist of Russia	JPL · 256697
256698 Zhuzhixin	2008 AX_{2}	Zhu Zhixin (1885–1920) was an activist, writer and polemicist who lived in the late Qing to early Republic of China era. The Zhixin High School in Guangzhou, founded in 1921, was established in his memory.	IAU · 256698
256699 Poudai	2008 AZ_{2}	The Chinese town of Poudai, on Hainan Island	JPL · 256699

== 256701–256800 ==
back to top

Named minor planet	Provisional	This minor planet was named for...	Ref · Catalog
256795 Suzyzahn	2008 CS_{68}	Suzy Collin-Zahn (born 1938), a specialist of quasars and Active Nuclei of Galaxies.	JPL · 256795
256796 Almanzor	2008 CN_{69}	Pico Almanzor (2592 m) in the Sierra de Gredos, the highest mountain in central Spain	JPL · 256796
256797 Benbow	2008 CA_{70}	Admiral Benbow Inn, the fictional home of Jim Hawkins in Robert Louis Stevenson's 1883 novel "Treasure Island".	JPL · 256797

== 256801–256900 ==
back to top

Named minor planet	Provisional	This minor planet was named for...	Ref · Catalog
256813 Marburg	2008 CW_{116}	Marburg, a city in central Germany	JPL · 256813
256892 Wutayou	2008 DW_{40}	Wu Ta-You (1907–2000), a Chinese atomic and nuclear theoretical physicist who introduced modern physics to China	JPL · 256892

== 256901–257000 ==
back to top

Named minor planet	Provisional	This minor planet was named for...	Ref · Catalog
There are no named minor planets in this number range

back to top

Preceded by 255,001–256,000	Meanings of minor-planet names List of minor planets: 256,001–257,000	Succeeded by 257,001–258,000
