= List of minor planets: 256001–257000 =

The following is a partial list of minor planets, running from minor-planet number 256001 through 257000, inclusive. The primary data for this and other partial lists is based on JPL's "Small-Body Orbital Elements" and data available from the Minor Planet Center. Critical list information is also provided by the MPC, unless otherwise specified from Lowell Observatory. A detailed description of the table's columns and additional sources are given on the main page including a complete list of every page in this series, and a statistical break-up on the dynamical classification of minor planets.

Also see the summary list of all named bodies in numerical and alphabetical order, and the corresponding naming citations for the number range of this particular list. New namings may only be added to this list after official publication, as the preannouncement of names is condemned by the Working Group for Small Bodies Nomenclature of the International Astronomical Union.

Near-Earth obj.	MBA (inner)	MBA (outer)	Centaur
Mars-crosser	MBA (middle)	Jupiter trojan	Trans-Neptunian obj.
Unclassified

== 256001–256100 ==
Designation			Discovery			Properties		Ref
Permanent	Provisional	Named after	Date	Site	Discoverer(s)	Category	Diam.	Ref
256001	2006 TY_{121}	—	October 11, 2006	Palomar	NEAT	HNS	1.2 km	MPC · JPL
256002	2006 TZ_{123}	—	October 2, 2006	Mount Lemmon	Mount Lemmon Survey	·	1.9 km	MPC · JPL
256003	2006 TK_{126}	—	October 3, 2006	Mount Lemmon	Mount Lemmon Survey	·	1.6 km	MPC · JPL
256004	2006 UP	—	October 16, 2006	Catalina	CSS	AMO	90 m	MPC · JPL
256005	2006 UY_{6}	—	October 16, 2006	Catalina	CSS	·	1.3 km	MPC · JPL
256006	2006 UV_{7}	—	October 16, 2006	Catalina	CSS	·	2.0 km	MPC · JPL
256007	2006 UP_{8}	—	October 16, 2006	Catalina	CSS	EUN	1.6 km	MPC · JPL
256008	2006 UW_{8}	—	October 16, 2006	Catalina	CSS	·	2.1 km	MPC · JPL
256009	2006 UR_{9}	—	October 16, 2006	Catalina	CSS	·	2.6 km	MPC · JPL
256010	2006 UA_{10}	—	October 16, 2006	Kitt Peak	Spacewatch	KON	2.5 km	MPC · JPL
256011	2006 UF_{10}	—	October 17, 2006	Catalina	CSS	·	2.1 km	MPC · JPL
256012	2006 UL_{10}	—	October 17, 2006	Mount Lemmon	Mount Lemmon Survey	·	3.8 km	MPC · JPL
256013	2006 US_{13}	—	October 17, 2006	Mount Lemmon	Mount Lemmon Survey	·	2.5 km	MPC · JPL
256014	2006 UC_{16}	—	October 17, 2006	Mount Lemmon	Mount Lemmon Survey	(5)	1.6 km	MPC · JPL
256015	2006 UG_{23}	—	October 16, 2006	Kitt Peak	Spacewatch	·	1.0 km	MPC · JPL
256016	2006 UY_{23}	—	October 16, 2006	Kitt Peak	Spacewatch	·	1.8 km	MPC · JPL
256017	2006 UF_{24}	—	October 16, 2006	Kitt Peak	Spacewatch	WIT	1.1 km	MPC · JPL
256018	2006 UE_{26}	—	October 16, 2006	Kitt Peak	Spacewatch	·	1.3 km	MPC · JPL
256019	2006 UG_{26}	—	October 16, 2006	Kitt Peak	Spacewatch	·	2.1 km	MPC · JPL
256020	2006 UB_{28}	—	October 16, 2006	Kitt Peak	Spacewatch	·	1.7 km	MPC · JPL
256021	2006 UO_{29}	—	October 16, 2006	Kitt Peak	Spacewatch	·	1.5 km	MPC · JPL
256022	2006 US_{29}	—	October 16, 2006	Kitt Peak	Spacewatch	·	2.1 km	MPC · JPL
256023	2006 UF_{32}	—	October 16, 2006	Kitt Peak	Spacewatch	·	1.2 km	MPC · JPL
256024	2006 UZ_{33}	—	October 16, 2006	Kitt Peak	Spacewatch	·	2.1 km	MPC · JPL
256025	2006 UJ_{36}	—	October 16, 2006	Catalina	CSS	·	2.6 km	MPC · JPL
256026	2006 UQ_{37}	—	October 16, 2006	Kitt Peak	Spacewatch	·	2.1 km	MPC · JPL
256027	2006 UF_{38}	—	October 16, 2006	Kitt Peak	Spacewatch	·	2.0 km	MPC · JPL
256028	2006 UQ_{39}	—	October 16, 2006	Kitt Peak	Spacewatch	(11882)	1.8 km	MPC · JPL
256029	2006 UU_{40}	—	October 16, 2006	Kitt Peak	Spacewatch	·	1.5 km	MPC · JPL
256030	2006 UA_{41}	—	October 16, 2006	Kitt Peak	Spacewatch	·	2.7 km	MPC · JPL
256031	2006 UH_{42}	—	October 16, 2006	Kitt Peak	Spacewatch	·	1.8 km	MPC · JPL
256032	2006 UK_{45}	—	October 16, 2006	Kitt Peak	Spacewatch	·	2.7 km	MPC · JPL
256033	2006 UJ_{47}	—	October 16, 2006	Bergisch Gladbach	W. Bickel	V · fast?	820 m	MPC · JPL
256034	2006 UM_{53}	—	October 17, 2006	Mount Lemmon	Mount Lemmon Survey	·	3.0 km	MPC · JPL
256035	2006 UQ_{62}	—	October 19, 2006	Goodricke-Pigott	R. A. Tucker	·	3.0 km	MPC · JPL
256036	2006 UX_{65}	—	October 16, 2006	Catalina	CSS	NYS	1.7 km	MPC · JPL
256037	2006 UF_{68}	—	October 16, 2006	Catalina	CSS	·	1.4 km	MPC · JPL
256038	2006 UC_{70}	—	October 16, 2006	Catalina	CSS	·	1.8 km	MPC · JPL
256039	2006 UO_{79}	—	October 17, 2006	Kitt Peak	Spacewatch	·	1.5 km	MPC · JPL
256040	2006 UM_{81}	—	October 17, 2006	Kitt Peak	Spacewatch	(5)	2.3 km	MPC · JPL
256041	2006 UX_{81}	—	October 17, 2006	Mount Lemmon	Mount Lemmon Survey	·	1.6 km	MPC · JPL
256042	2006 UR_{82}	—	October 17, 2006	Kitt Peak	Spacewatch	·	2.1 km	MPC · JPL
256043	2006 UT_{82}	—	October 17, 2006	Kitt Peak	Spacewatch	·	2.3 km	MPC · JPL
256044	2006 UU_{87}	—	October 17, 2006	Mount Lemmon	Mount Lemmon Survey	·	2.5 km	MPC · JPL
256045	2006 UQ_{88}	—	October 17, 2006	Kitt Peak	Spacewatch	·	1.3 km	MPC · JPL
256046	2006 UY_{89}	—	October 17, 2006	Kitt Peak	Spacewatch	NEM	2.8 km	MPC · JPL
256047	2006 UH_{91}	—	October 17, 2006	Kitt Peak	Spacewatch	·	1.5 km	MPC · JPL
256048	2006 UJ_{92}	—	October 18, 2006	Kitt Peak	Spacewatch	·	1.5 km	MPC · JPL
256049	2006 UP_{99}	—	October 18, 2006	Kitt Peak	Spacewatch	·	1.9 km	MPC · JPL
256050	2006 UV_{102}	—	October 18, 2006	Kitt Peak	Spacewatch	·	2.5 km	MPC · JPL
256051	2006 UY_{104}	—	October 18, 2006	Kitt Peak	Spacewatch	·	1.4 km	MPC · JPL
256052	2006 UH_{120}	—	October 19, 2006	Kitt Peak	Spacewatch	·	1.5 km	MPC · JPL
256053	2006 UR_{120}	—	October 19, 2006	Kitt Peak	Spacewatch	·	1.8 km	MPC · JPL
256054	2006 UX_{120}	—	October 19, 2006	Kitt Peak	Spacewatch	·	2.3 km	MPC · JPL
256055	2006 UR_{121}	—	October 19, 2006	Kitt Peak	Spacewatch	·	1.3 km	MPC · JPL
256056	2006 UL_{123}	—	October 19, 2006	Kitt Peak	Spacewatch	·	2.0 km	MPC · JPL
256057	2006 UT_{126}	—	October 19, 2006	Kitt Peak	Spacewatch	·	1.1 km	MPC · JPL
256058	2006 UA_{132}	—	October 19, 2006	Catalina	CSS	·	1.7 km	MPC · JPL
256059	2006 UB_{133}	—	October 19, 2006	Kitt Peak	Spacewatch	·	1.8 km	MPC · JPL
256060	2006 UY_{134}	—	October 19, 2006	Palomar	NEAT	·	2.4 km	MPC · JPL
256061	2006 UX_{135}	—	October 19, 2006	Kitt Peak	Spacewatch	·	2.0 km	MPC · JPL
256062	2006 UR_{136}	—	October 19, 2006	Mount Lemmon	Mount Lemmon Survey	·	2.1 km	MPC · JPL
256063	2006 UY_{140}	—	October 19, 2006	Kitt Peak	Spacewatch	WIT	990 m	MPC · JPL
256064	2006 UW_{142}	—	October 19, 2006	Kitt Peak	Spacewatch	·	1.9 km	MPC · JPL
256065	2006 UH_{144}	—	October 19, 2006	Catalina	CSS	BAR	1.4 km	MPC · JPL
256066	2006 UD_{146}	—	October 20, 2006	Mount Lemmon	Mount Lemmon Survey	V	900 m	MPC · JPL
256067	2006 UF_{158}	—	October 21, 2006	Mount Lemmon	Mount Lemmon Survey	·	1.8 km	MPC · JPL
256068	2006 UB_{172}	—	October 21, 2006	Mount Lemmon	Mount Lemmon Survey	·	2.0 km	MPC · JPL
256069	2006 UV_{175}	—	October 16, 2006	Catalina	CSS	·	1.5 km	MPC · JPL
256070	2006 UB_{176}	—	October 16, 2006	Catalina	CSS	·	1.4 km	MPC · JPL
256071	2006 UN_{178}	—	October 16, 2006	Catalina	CSS	·	1.2 km	MPC · JPL
256072	2006 UQ_{179}	—	October 16, 2006	Catalina	CSS	·	1.7 km	MPC · JPL
256073	2006 UF_{181}	—	October 16, 2006	Catalina	CSS	·	2.0 km	MPC · JPL
256074	2006 UD_{182}	—	October 16, 2006	Catalina	CSS	EUN	1.4 km	MPC · JPL
256075	2006 UE_{186}	—	October 17, 2006	Catalina	CSS	WIT	1.5 km	MPC · JPL
256076	2006 UF_{190}	—	October 19, 2006	Catalina	CSS	MAR	1.1 km	MPC · JPL
256077	2006 UU_{191}	—	October 19, 2006	Catalina	CSS	·	2.8 km	MPC · JPL
256078	2006 UQ_{200}	—	October 21, 2006	Kitt Peak	Spacewatch	·	1.6 km	MPC · JPL
256079	2006 UH_{201}	—	October 21, 2006	Kitt Peak	Spacewatch	V	740 m	MPC · JPL
256080	2006 UL_{202}	—	October 22, 2006	Catalina	CSS	V	960 m	MPC · JPL
256081	2006 UB_{203}	—	October 22, 2006	Palomar	NEAT	·	1.8 km	MPC · JPL
256082	2006 UG_{203}	—	October 22, 2006	Palomar	NEAT	·	1.4 km	MPC · JPL
256083	2006 UZ_{203}	—	October 22, 2006	Palomar	NEAT	·	2.1 km	MPC · JPL
256084	2006 UR_{205}	—	October 23, 2006	Kitt Peak	Spacewatch	MAS	1 km	MPC · JPL
256085	2006 UK_{207}	—	October 23, 2006	Socorro	LINEAR	·	3.0 km	MPC · JPL
256086	2006 UX_{207}	—	October 23, 2006	Kitt Peak	Spacewatch	·	1.4 km	MPC · JPL
256087	2006 UY_{207}	—	October 23, 2006	Kitt Peak	Spacewatch	·	2.1 km	MPC · JPL
256088	2006 UJ_{213}	—	October 23, 2006	Kitt Peak	Spacewatch	·	1.9 km	MPC · JPL
256089	2006 UD_{214}	—	October 23, 2006	Kitt Peak	Spacewatch	(5)	1.4 km	MPC · JPL
256090	2006 UO_{216}	—	October 17, 2006	Mount Lemmon	Mount Lemmon Survey	(5)	1.4 km	MPC · JPL
256091	2006 UH_{218}	—	October 27, 2006	Mount Nyukasa	Japan Aerospace Exploration Agency	·	1.8 km	MPC · JPL
256092	2006 UE_{220}	—	October 16, 2006	Catalina	CSS	RAF	1.2 km	MPC · JPL
256093	2006 UJ_{221}	—	October 17, 2006	Catalina	CSS	·	1.6 km	MPC · JPL
256094	2006 UF_{229}	—	October 20, 2006	Palomar	NEAT	·	1.2 km	MPC · JPL
256095	2006 UM_{229}	—	October 20, 2006	Palomar	NEAT	·	2.0 km	MPC · JPL
256096	2006 UX_{234}	—	October 22, 2006	Mount Lemmon	Mount Lemmon Survey	·	3.0 km	MPC · JPL
256097	2006 UK_{239}	—	October 23, 2006	Kitt Peak	Spacewatch	·	2.9 km	MPC · JPL
256098	2006 UF_{244}	—	October 27, 2006	Mount Lemmon	Mount Lemmon Survey	(5)	1 km	MPC · JPL
256099	2006 UG_{248}	—	October 27, 2006	Mount Lemmon	Mount Lemmon Survey	·	1.5 km	MPC · JPL
256100	2006 UU_{254}	—	October 27, 2006	Mount Lemmon	Mount Lemmon Survey	·	1.6 km	MPC · JPL

== 256101–256200 ==
back to top

Designation			Discovery			Properties		Ref
Permanent	Provisional	Named after	Date	Site	Discoverer(s)	Category	Diam.	Ref
256101	2006 UT_{255}	—	October 27, 2006	Mount Lemmon	Mount Lemmon Survey	·	1.4 km	MPC · JPL
256102	2006 UW_{260}	—	October 28, 2006	Mount Lemmon	Mount Lemmon Survey	·	2.2 km	MPC · JPL
256103	2006 UX_{262}	—	October 29, 2006	Mount Lemmon	Mount Lemmon Survey	·	2.0 km	MPC · JPL
256104	2006 US_{265}	—	October 27, 2006	Catalina	CSS	V	840 m	MPC · JPL
256105	2006 UC_{266}	—	October 27, 2006	Catalina	CSS	WIT	1.5 km	MPC · JPL
256106	2006 UK_{271}	—	October 27, 2006	Mount Lemmon	Mount Lemmon Survey	MIS	2.8 km	MPC · JPL
256107	2006 UJ_{272}	—	October 27, 2006	Mount Lemmon	Mount Lemmon Survey	·	1.6 km	MPC · JPL
256108	2006 UX_{273}	—	October 27, 2006	Kitt Peak	Spacewatch	·	2.1 km	MPC · JPL
256109	2006 UG_{281}	—	October 28, 2006	Mount Lemmon	Mount Lemmon Survey	·	1.5 km	MPC · JPL
256110	2006 UX_{282}	—	October 28, 2006	Kitt Peak	Spacewatch	BRG	1.3 km	MPC · JPL
256111	2006 UE_{283}	—	October 28, 2006	Kitt Peak	Spacewatch	·	1.8 km	MPC · JPL
256112	2006 UX_{285}	—	October 28, 2006	Kitt Peak	Spacewatch	·	1.4 km	MPC · JPL
256113	2006 UH_{290}	—	October 31, 2006	Kitt Peak	Spacewatch	·	1.7 km	MPC · JPL
256114	2006 UD_{291}	—	October 22, 2006	Siding Spring	SSS	HNS	2.3 km	MPC · JPL
256115	2006 UA_{295}	—	October 19, 2006	Kitt Peak	M. W. Buie	MAS	630 m	MPC · JPL
256116	2006 UW_{297}	—	October 19, 2006	Kitt Peak	M. W. Buie	MAS	910 m	MPC · JPL
256117	2006 UW_{327}	—	October 20, 2006	Kitt Peak	Spacewatch	NYS	1.4 km	MPC · JPL
256118	2006 UQ_{328}	—	October 19, 2006	Catalina	CSS	·	2.6 km	MPC · JPL
256119	2006 UC_{329}	—	October 21, 2006	Kitt Peak	Spacewatch	·	1.7 km	MPC · JPL
256120	2006 UM_{329}	—	October 23, 2006	Catalina	CSS	EUN	2.0 km	MPC · JPL
256121	2006 UM_{331}	—	October 21, 2006	Mount Lemmon	Mount Lemmon Survey	·	2.0 km	MPC · JPL
256122	2006 UK_{333}	—	October 22, 2006	Apache Point	A. C. Becker	·	1.9 km	MPC · JPL
256123	2006 UZ_{334}	—	October 21, 2006	Kitt Peak	Spacewatch	·	1.3 km	MPC · JPL
256124	2006 UK_{337}	—	October 20, 2006	Mount Lemmon	Mount Lemmon Survey	(194)	2.9 km	MPC · JPL
256125	2006 UR_{337}	—	October 17, 2006	Catalina	CSS	·	2.8 km	MPC · JPL
256126	2006 UW_{346}	—	October 28, 2006	Catalina	CSS	HNS	1.7 km	MPC · JPL
256127	2006 UX_{358}	—	October 19, 2006	Mount Lemmon	Mount Lemmon Survey	·	2.8 km	MPC · JPL
256128	2006 VD	—	November 1, 2006	Wrightwood	J. W. Young	HNS	1.3 km	MPC · JPL
256129	2006 VS_{1}	—	November 2, 2006	Mount Lemmon	Mount Lemmon Survey	·	2.6 km	MPC · JPL
256130	2006 VF_{3}	—	November 9, 2006	Kitt Peak	Spacewatch	·	1.9 km	MPC · JPL
256131	2006 VR_{5}	—	November 10, 2006	Kitt Peak	Spacewatch	(5)	1.4 km	MPC · JPL
256132	2006 VY_{6}	—	November 10, 2006	Kitt Peak	Spacewatch	·	1.7 km	MPC · JPL
256133	2006 VK_{7}	—	November 10, 2006	Kitt Peak	Spacewatch	·	1.7 km	MPC · JPL
256134	2006 VQ_{10}	—	November 11, 2006	Catalina	CSS	·	1.8 km	MPC · JPL
256135	2006 VN_{12}	—	November 11, 2006	Kitt Peak	Spacewatch	·	2.2 km	MPC · JPL
256136	2006 VU_{12}	—	November 11, 2006	Goodricke-Pigott	R. A. Tucker	·	2.3 km	MPC · JPL
256137	2006 VZ_{12}	—	November 1, 2006	Catalina	CSS	HNS	2.0 km	MPC · JPL
256138	2006 VQ_{15}	—	November 9, 2006	Kitt Peak	Spacewatch	·	1.6 km	MPC · JPL
256139	2006 VJ_{19}	—	November 9, 2006	Kitt Peak	Spacewatch	HYG	4.0 km	MPC · JPL
256140	2006 VL_{19}	—	November 9, 2006	Kitt Peak	Spacewatch	AGN	1.4 km	MPC · JPL
256141	2006 VF_{20}	—	November 9, 2006	Kitt Peak	Spacewatch	·	1.4 km	MPC · JPL
256142	2006 VM_{22}	—	November 10, 2006	Kitt Peak	Spacewatch	·	2.4 km	MPC · JPL
256143	2006 VA_{25}	—	November 10, 2006	Kitt Peak	Spacewatch	·	1.6 km	MPC · JPL
256144	2006 VD_{26}	—	November 10, 2006	Kitt Peak	Spacewatch	·	2.1 km	MPC · JPL
256145	2006 VF_{30}	—	November 10, 2006	Kitt Peak	Spacewatch	WIT	1.0 km	MPC · JPL
256146	2006 VM_{30}	—	November 10, 2006	Kitt Peak	Spacewatch	(5)	1.9 km	MPC · JPL
256147	2006 VQ_{31}	—	November 11, 2006	Kitt Peak	Spacewatch	·	1.1 km	MPC · JPL
256148	2006 VW_{31}	—	November 11, 2006	Kitt Peak	Spacewatch	·	2.0 km	MPC · JPL
256149	2006 VU_{33}	—	November 11, 2006	Mount Lemmon	Mount Lemmon Survey	MAS	1.1 km	MPC · JPL
256150	2006 VE_{34}	—	November 11, 2006	Catalina	CSS	MAR	2.1 km	MPC · JPL
256151	2006 VH_{34}	—	November 11, 2006	Catalina	CSS	EUN	2.1 km	MPC · JPL
256152	2006 VU_{36}	—	November 11, 2006	Catalina	CSS	·	1.9 km	MPC · JPL
256153	2006 VA_{42}	—	November 12, 2006	Mount Lemmon	Mount Lemmon Survey	·	1.6 km	MPC · JPL
256154	2006 VU_{43}	—	November 13, 2006	Kitt Peak	Spacewatch	·	2.3 km	MPC · JPL
256155	2006 VO_{44}	—	November 15, 2006	Socorro	LINEAR	·	2.5 km	MPC · JPL
256156	2006 VJ_{48}	—	November 10, 2006	Kitt Peak	Spacewatch	·	1.6 km	MPC · JPL
256157	2006 VX_{48}	—	November 10, 2006	Kitt Peak	Spacewatch	·	1.4 km	MPC · JPL
256158	2006 VO_{49}	—	November 10, 2006	Kitt Peak	Spacewatch	·	2.2 km	MPC · JPL
256159	2006 VF_{50}	—	November 10, 2006	Kitt Peak	Spacewatch	·	2.0 km	MPC · JPL
256160	2006 VZ_{50}	—	November 10, 2006	Kitt Peak	Spacewatch	·	1.9 km	MPC · JPL
256161	2006 VN_{52}	—	November 11, 2006	Kitt Peak	Spacewatch	(5)	1.6 km	MPC · JPL
256162	2006 VD_{53}	—	November 11, 2006	Kitt Peak	Spacewatch	·	1.9 km	MPC · JPL
256163	2006 VL_{53}	—	November 11, 2006	Kitt Peak	Spacewatch	(5)	1.7 km	MPC · JPL
256164	2006 VP_{53}	—	November 11, 2006	Kitt Peak	Spacewatch	·	2.7 km	MPC · JPL
256165	2006 VW_{54}	—	November 11, 2006	Kitt Peak	Spacewatch	·	1.6 km	MPC · JPL
256166	2006 VG_{55}	—	November 11, 2006	Kitt Peak	Spacewatch	ERI	3.0 km	MPC · JPL
256167	2006 VK_{55}	—	November 11, 2006	Kitt Peak	Spacewatch	·	1.1 km	MPC · JPL
256168	2006 VX_{55}	—	November 11, 2006	Kitt Peak	Spacewatch	·	2.1 km	MPC · JPL
256169	2006 VB_{56}	—	November 11, 2006	Kitt Peak	Spacewatch	·	2.3 km	MPC · JPL
256170	2006 VO_{61}	—	November 11, 2006	Kitt Peak	Spacewatch	·	1.8 km	MPC · JPL
256171	2006 VT_{63}	—	November 11, 2006	Kitt Peak	Spacewatch	·	1.5 km	MPC · JPL
256172	2006 VD_{64}	—	November 11, 2006	Kitt Peak	Spacewatch	·	2.1 km	MPC · JPL
256173	2006 VM_{65}	—	November 11, 2006	Kitt Peak	Spacewatch	·	1.7 km	MPC · JPL
256174	2006 VS_{67}	—	November 11, 2006	Kitt Peak	Spacewatch	EUN	2.0 km	MPC · JPL
256175	2006 VZ_{67}	—	November 11, 2006	Kitt Peak	Spacewatch	EUN	1.8 km	MPC · JPL
256176	2006 VG_{68}	—	November 11, 2006	Kitt Peak	Spacewatch	MIS	2.1 km	MPC · JPL
256177	2006 VP_{68}	—	November 11, 2006	Catalina	CSS	·	2.3 km	MPC · JPL
256178	2006 VD_{69}	—	November 11, 2006	Catalina	CSS	·	2.5 km	MPC · JPL
256179	2006 VY_{69}	—	November 11, 2006	Kitt Peak	Spacewatch	EUN	2.4 km	MPC · JPL
256180	2006 VT_{71}	—	November 11, 2006	Mount Lemmon	Mount Lemmon Survey	·	1.6 km	MPC · JPL
256181	2006 VM_{73}	—	November 11, 2006	Mount Lemmon	Mount Lemmon Survey	·	1.7 km	MPC · JPL
256182	2006 VW_{73}	—	November 11, 2006	Mount Lemmon	Mount Lemmon Survey	JUN	1.5 km	MPC · JPL
256183	2006 VE_{74}	—	November 11, 2006	Kitt Peak	Spacewatch	·	1.9 km	MPC · JPL
256184	2006 VC_{75}	—	November 11, 2006	Mount Lemmon	Mount Lemmon Survey	(5)	2.2 km	MPC · JPL
256185	2006 VS_{75}	—	November 11, 2006	Kitt Peak	Spacewatch	·	1.8 km	MPC · JPL
256186	2006 VQ_{77}	—	November 12, 2006	Mount Lemmon	Mount Lemmon Survey	RAF	1.3 km	MPC · JPL
256187	2006 VH_{78}	—	November 12, 2006	Mount Lemmon	Mount Lemmon Survey	·	4.0 km	MPC · JPL
256188	2006 VO_{79}	—	November 12, 2006	Mount Lemmon	Mount Lemmon Survey	·	1.7 km	MPC · JPL
256189	2006 VD_{80}	—	November 12, 2006	Mount Lemmon	Mount Lemmon Survey	·	1.3 km	MPC · JPL
256190	2006 VC_{84}	—	November 13, 2006	Mount Lemmon	Mount Lemmon Survey	RAF	1.6 km	MPC · JPL
256191	2006 VX_{84}	—	November 13, 2006	Mount Lemmon	Mount Lemmon Survey	EUN	1.4 km	MPC · JPL
256192	2006 VU_{85}	—	November 14, 2006	Kitt Peak	Spacewatch	·	1.8 km	MPC · JPL
256193	2006 VP_{87}	—	November 14, 2006	Catalina	CSS	·	1.7 km	MPC · JPL
256194	2006 VD_{88}	—	November 14, 2006	Mount Lemmon	Mount Lemmon Survey	·	1.6 km	MPC · JPL
256195	2006 VY_{88}	—	November 14, 2006	Socorro	LINEAR	·	2.2 km	MPC · JPL
256196	2006 VG_{89}	—	November 14, 2006	Socorro	LINEAR	·	2.5 km	MPC · JPL
256197	2006 VH_{89}	—	November 14, 2006	Socorro	LINEAR	·	2.9 km	MPC · JPL
256198	2006 VA_{90}	—	November 14, 2006	Kitt Peak	Spacewatch	NEM	2.4 km	MPC · JPL
256199	2006 VD_{90}	—	November 14, 2006	Socorro	LINEAR	·	2.2 km	MPC · JPL
256200	2006 VY_{92}	—	November 15, 2006	Mount Lemmon	Mount Lemmon Survey	·	1.9 km	MPC · JPL

== 256201–256300 ==
back to top

Designation			Discovery			Properties		Ref
Permanent	Provisional	Named after	Date	Site	Discoverer(s)	Category	Diam.	Ref
256201	2006 VW_{93}	—	November 15, 2006	Mount Lemmon	Mount Lemmon Survey	·	1.3 km	MPC · JPL
256202	2006 VV_{94}	—	November 15, 2006	Mount Lemmon	Mount Lemmon Survey	·	2.1 km	MPC · JPL
256203	2006 VW_{94}	—	November 15, 2006	Mount Lemmon	Mount Lemmon Survey	GEF	1.5 km	MPC · JPL
256204	2006 VY_{94}	—	November 15, 2006	Kitt Peak	Spacewatch	·	1.6 km	MPC · JPL
256205	2006 VB_{96}	—	November 10, 2006	Kitt Peak	Spacewatch	HNS	1.5 km	MPC · JPL
256206	2006 VV_{96}	—	November 10, 2006	Kitt Peak	Spacewatch	·	2.0 km	MPC · JPL
256207	2006 VD_{103}	—	November 12, 2006	Mount Lemmon	Mount Lemmon Survey	·	1.7 km	MPC · JPL
256208	2006 VG_{103}	—	November 12, 2006	Lulin	Lin, H.-C., Q. Ye	·	1.6 km	MPC · JPL
256209	2006 VW_{103}	—	November 12, 2006	Lulin	Lin, H.-C., Q. Ye	·	1.8 km	MPC · JPL
256210	2006 VN_{111}	—	November 13, 2006	Kitt Peak	Spacewatch	·	1.9 km	MPC · JPL
256211	2006 VR_{111}	—	November 13, 2006	Kitt Peak	Spacewatch	·	2.4 km	MPC · JPL
256212	2006 VG_{112}	—	November 13, 2006	Catalina	CSS	·	2.2 km	MPC · JPL
256213	2006 VS_{113}	—	November 13, 2006	Mount Lemmon	Mount Lemmon Survey	·	2.8 km	MPC · JPL
256214	2006 VD_{117}	—	November 14, 2006	Kitt Peak	Spacewatch	·	1.9 km	MPC · JPL
256215	2006 VH_{117}	—	November 14, 2006	Kitt Peak	Spacewatch	·	1.9 km	MPC · JPL
256216	2006 VD_{122}	—	November 14, 2006	Socorro	LINEAR	·	2.4 km	MPC · JPL
256217	2006 VF_{123}	—	November 14, 2006	Kitt Peak	Spacewatch	(5)	1.9 km	MPC · JPL
256218	2006 VN_{123}	—	November 14, 2006	Socorro	LINEAR	·	2.9 km	MPC · JPL
256219	2006 VW_{124}	—	November 14, 2006	Kitt Peak	Spacewatch	·	2.0 km	MPC · JPL
256220	2006 VB_{129}	—	November 15, 2006	Kitt Peak	Spacewatch	·	1.9 km	MPC · JPL
256221	2006 VB_{132}	—	November 15, 2006	Kitt Peak	Spacewatch	·	1.5 km	MPC · JPL
256222	2006 VE_{134}	—	November 15, 2006	Mount Lemmon	Mount Lemmon Survey	·	1.4 km	MPC · JPL
256223	2006 VV_{139}	—	November 15, 2006	Kitt Peak	Spacewatch	·	1.6 km	MPC · JPL
256224	2006 VV_{140}	—	November 15, 2006	Kitt Peak	Spacewatch	·	1.5 km	MPC · JPL
256225	2006 VY_{144}	—	November 15, 2006	Catalina	CSS	·	1.6 km	MPC · JPL
256226	2006 VS_{146}	—	November 15, 2006	Kitt Peak	Spacewatch	·	1.9 km	MPC · JPL
256227	2006 VU_{146}	—	November 15, 2006	Mount Lemmon	Mount Lemmon Survey	·	2.9 km	MPC · JPL
256228	2006 VY_{146}	—	November 15, 2006	Mount Lemmon	Mount Lemmon Survey	(5)	1.8 km	MPC · JPL
256229	2006 VC_{148}	—	November 15, 2006	Catalina	CSS	JUN	1.4 km	MPC · JPL
256230	2006 VO_{149}	—	November 2, 2006	Catalina	CSS	·	2.3 km	MPC · JPL
256231	2006 VG_{151}	—	November 9, 2006	Palomar	NEAT	·	2.1 km	MPC · JPL
256232	2006 VV_{151}	—	November 9, 2006	Palomar	NEAT	·	1.5 km	MPC · JPL
256233	2006 VA_{152}	—	November 9, 2006	Palomar	NEAT	·	3.6 km	MPC · JPL
256234	2006 VD_{152}	—	November 9, 2006	Palomar	NEAT	·	2.4 km	MPC · JPL
256235	2006 VH_{153}	—	November 8, 2006	Palomar	NEAT	·	2.8 km	MPC · JPL
256236	2006 VK_{154}	—	November 8, 2006	Palomar	NEAT	AST	3.2 km	MPC · JPL
256237	2006 VM_{172}	—	November 12, 2006	Catalina	CSS	·	1.4 km	MPC · JPL
256238	2006 WD	—	November 16, 2006	7300	W. K. Y. Yeung	EUN	1.9 km	MPC · JPL
256239	2006 WC_{5}	—	November 16, 2006	Kitt Peak	Spacewatch	·	2.2 km	MPC · JPL
256240	2006 WK_{13}	—	November 16, 2006	Mount Lemmon	Mount Lemmon Survey	·	1.8 km	MPC · JPL
256241	2006 WN_{13}	—	November 16, 2006	Mount Lemmon	Mount Lemmon Survey	AGN	1.5 km	MPC · JPL
256242	2006 WR_{13}	—	November 16, 2006	Mount Lemmon	Mount Lemmon Survey	·	3.0 km	MPC · JPL
256243	2006 WG_{15}	—	November 16, 2006	Lulin	Chang, M.-T., Q. Ye	·	2.4 km	MPC · JPL
256244	2006 WM_{16}	—	November 17, 2006	Kitt Peak	Spacewatch	·	2.8 km	MPC · JPL
256245	2006 WW_{23}	—	November 17, 2006	Mount Lemmon	Mount Lemmon Survey	(5)	1.5 km	MPC · JPL
256246	2006 WM_{24}	—	November 17, 2006	Mount Lemmon	Mount Lemmon Survey	(5)	1.9 km	MPC · JPL
256247	2006 WS_{26}	—	November 18, 2006	Socorro	LINEAR	(5)	1.7 km	MPC · JPL
256248	2006 WD_{27}	—	November 18, 2006	Kitt Peak	Spacewatch	·	2.0 km	MPC · JPL
256249	2006 WC_{28}	—	November 22, 2006	7300	W. K. Y. Yeung	·	3.9 km	MPC · JPL
256250	2006 WE_{28}	—	November 22, 2006	7300	W. K. Y. Yeung	·	1.7 km	MPC · JPL
256251	2006 WF_{28}	—	November 22, 2006	7300	W. K. Y. Yeung	·	1.5 km	MPC · JPL
256252	2006 WC_{29}	—	November 19, 2006	Kitt Peak	Spacewatch	·	1.5 km	MPC · JPL
256253	2006 WE_{36}	—	November 16, 2006	Kitt Peak	Spacewatch	·	2.0 km	MPC · JPL
256254	2006 WO_{40}	—	November 16, 2006	Kitt Peak	Spacewatch	·	1.9 km	MPC · JPL
256255	2006 WR_{44}	—	November 16, 2006	Kitt Peak	Spacewatch	·	1.9 km	MPC · JPL
256256	2006 WV_{48}	—	November 16, 2006	Mount Lemmon	Mount Lemmon Survey	·	2.0 km	MPC · JPL
256257	2006 WA_{49}	—	November 16, 2006	Mount Lemmon	Mount Lemmon Survey	·	1.5 km	MPC · JPL
256258	2006 WB_{51}	—	November 16, 2006	Kitt Peak	Spacewatch	·	2.4 km	MPC · JPL
256259	2006 WL_{52}	—	November 16, 2006	Kitt Peak	Spacewatch	·	2.7 km	MPC · JPL
256260	2006 WH_{54}	—	November 16, 2006	Kitt Peak	Spacewatch	·	1.4 km	MPC · JPL
256261	2006 WN_{55}	—	November 16, 2006	Kitt Peak	Spacewatch	WIT	1.3 km	MPC · JPL
256262	2006 WS_{63}	—	November 17, 2006	Mount Lemmon	Mount Lemmon Survey	·	2.0 km	MPC · JPL
256263	2006 WH_{66}	—	November 17, 2006	Mount Lemmon	Mount Lemmon Survey	·	1.7 km	MPC · JPL
256264	2006 WW_{70}	—	November 18, 2006	Kitt Peak	Spacewatch	·	2.1 km	MPC · JPL
256265	2006 WA_{74}	—	November 18, 2006	Kitt Peak	Spacewatch	·	2.2 km	MPC · JPL
256266	2006 WG_{76}	—	November 18, 2006	Kitt Peak	Spacewatch	·	3.2 km	MPC · JPL
256267	2006 WJ_{76}	—	November 18, 2006	Kitt Peak	Spacewatch	(17392)	1.8 km	MPC · JPL
256268	2006 WP_{80}	—	November 18, 2006	Kitt Peak	Spacewatch	(12739)	2.0 km	MPC · JPL
256269	2006 WE_{81}	—	November 18, 2006	Kitt Peak	Spacewatch	·	2.9 km	MPC · JPL
256270	2006 WV_{82}	—	November 18, 2006	Kitt Peak	Spacewatch	·	2.3 km	MPC · JPL
256271	2006 WL_{88}	—	November 18, 2006	Mount Lemmon	Mount Lemmon Survey	(5)	1.7 km	MPC · JPL
256272	2006 WA_{90}	—	November 18, 2006	Kitt Peak	Spacewatch	·	3.8 km	MPC · JPL
256273	2006 WK_{90}	—	November 18, 2006	Mount Lemmon	Mount Lemmon Survey	·	1.8 km	MPC · JPL
256274	2006 WE_{91}	—	November 19, 2006	Kitt Peak	Spacewatch	EUN	1.5 km	MPC · JPL
256275	2006 WZ_{94}	—	November 19, 2006	Kitt Peak	Spacewatch	·	1.6 km	MPC · JPL
256276	2006 WJ_{98}	—	November 19, 2006	Kitt Peak	Spacewatch	EUN	1.4 km	MPC · JPL
256277	2006 WV_{98}	—	November 19, 2006	Kitt Peak	Spacewatch	·	2.1 km	MPC · JPL
256278	2006 WH_{104}	—	November 19, 2006	Kitt Peak	Spacewatch	·	1.8 km	MPC · JPL
256279	2006 WQ_{104}	—	November 19, 2006	Kitt Peak	Spacewatch	·	2.0 km	MPC · JPL
256280	2006 WX_{104}	—	November 19, 2006	Kitt Peak	Spacewatch	AGN	1.7 km	MPC · JPL
256281	2006 WK_{105}	—	November 19, 2006	Kitt Peak	Spacewatch	·	2.1 km	MPC · JPL
256282	2006 WT_{105}	—	November 19, 2006	Kitt Peak	Spacewatch	·	1.1 km	MPC · JPL
256283	2006 WQ_{112}	—	November 19, 2006	Kitt Peak	Spacewatch	(5)	2.2 km	MPC · JPL
256284	2006 WJ_{115}	—	November 20, 2006	Socorro	LINEAR	·	2.6 km	MPC · JPL
256285	2006 WZ_{115}	—	November 20, 2006	Socorro	LINEAR	·	1.8 km	MPC · JPL
256286	2006 WC_{116}	—	November 20, 2006	Socorro	LINEAR	·	2.3 km	MPC · JPL
256287	2006 WN_{120}	—	November 21, 2006	Socorro	LINEAR	·	1.7 km	MPC · JPL
256288	2006 WE_{124}	—	November 22, 2006	Mount Lemmon	Mount Lemmon Survey	MAR	1.2 km	MPC · JPL
256289	2006 WF_{127}	—	November 22, 2006	Mount Lemmon	Mount Lemmon Survey	·	2.9 km	MPC · JPL
256290	2006 WL_{128}	—	November 26, 2006	7300	W. K. Y. Yeung	·	1.6 km	MPC · JPL
256291	2006 WZ_{129}	—	November 26, 2006	Bergisch Gladbach	W. Bickel	·	1.3 km	MPC · JPL
256292	2006 WF_{130}	—	November 28, 2006	7300	W. K. Y. Yeung	·	2.3 km	MPC · JPL
256293	2006 WY_{131}	—	November 18, 2006	Kitt Peak	Spacewatch	·	2.5 km	MPC · JPL
256294	2006 WL_{132}	—	November 18, 2006	Kitt Peak	Spacewatch	·	1.7 km	MPC · JPL
256295	2006 WS_{134}	—	November 18, 2006	Mount Lemmon	Mount Lemmon Survey	·	1.9 km	MPC · JPL
256296	2006 WC_{135}	—	November 18, 2006	Catalina	CSS	·	2.3 km	MPC · JPL
256297	2006 WE_{136}	—	November 19, 2006	Kitt Peak	Spacewatch	·	1.8 km	MPC · JPL
256298	2006 WU_{136}	—	November 19, 2006	Socorro	LINEAR	WIT	1.3 km	MPC · JPL
256299	2006 WJ_{139}	—	November 19, 2006	Kitt Peak	Spacewatch	·	1.5 km	MPC · JPL
256300	2006 WK_{140}	—	November 19, 2006	7300	W. K. Y. Yeung	·	3.7 km	MPC · JPL

== 256301–256400 ==
back to top

Designation			Discovery			Properties		Ref
Permanent	Provisional	Named after	Date	Site	Discoverer(s)	Category	Diam.	Ref
256301	2006 WF_{150}	—	November 20, 2006	Kitt Peak	Spacewatch	·	1.4 km	MPC · JPL
256302	2006 WQ_{166}	—	November 23, 2006	Kitt Peak	Spacewatch	·	2.4 km	MPC · JPL
256303	2006 WW_{173}	—	November 23, 2006	Kitt Peak	Spacewatch	·	3.5 km	MPC · JPL
256304	2006 WD_{176}	—	November 23, 2006	Kitt Peak	Spacewatch	·	2.0 km	MPC · JPL
256305	2006 WM_{178}	—	November 23, 2006	Mount Lemmon	Mount Lemmon Survey	·	3.3 km	MPC · JPL
256306	2006 WG_{184}	—	November 25, 2006	Mount Lemmon	Mount Lemmon Survey	·	2.6 km	MPC · JPL
256307	2006 WN_{185}	—	November 16, 2006	Catalina	CSS	·	1.7 km	MPC · JPL
256308	2006 WO_{185}	—	November 16, 2006	Catalina	CSS	·	2.6 km	MPC · JPL
256309	2006 WJ_{186}	—	November 17, 2006	Palomar	NEAT	·	1.5 km	MPC · JPL
256310	2006 WL_{186}	—	November 17, 2006	Palomar	NEAT	·	3.6 km	MPC · JPL
256311	2006 WR_{189}	—	November 25, 2006	Mount Lemmon	Mount Lemmon Survey	·	2.5 km	MPC · JPL
256312	2006 WU_{190}	—	November 25, 2006	Kitt Peak	Spacewatch	·	2.8 km	MPC · JPL
256313	2006 WW_{191}	—	November 27, 2006	Catalina	CSS	·	1.9 km	MPC · JPL
256314	2006 WE_{193}	—	November 27, 2006	Kitt Peak	Spacewatch	·	2.0 km	MPC · JPL
256315	2006 WS_{193}	—	November 27, 2006	Mount Lemmon	Mount Lemmon Survey	·	4.2 km	MPC · JPL
256316	2006 WX_{193}	—	November 27, 2006	Kitt Peak	Spacewatch	·	2.2 km	MPC · JPL
256317	2006 WA_{194}	—	November 27, 2006	Kitt Peak	Spacewatch	·	4.8 km	MPC · JPL
256318	2006 WA_{199}	—	November 17, 2006	Kitt Peak	Spacewatch	·	3.7 km	MPC · JPL
256319	2006 XB_{4}	—	December 14, 2006	Cordell-Lorenz	Cordell-Lorenz	·	1.3 km	MPC · JPL
256320	2006 XK_{5}	—	December 5, 2006	Palomar	NEAT	EUN	1.7 km	MPC · JPL
256321	2006 XL_{6}	—	December 9, 2006	Palomar	NEAT	·	3.3 km	MPC · JPL
256322	2006 XN_{6}	—	December 9, 2006	Palomar	NEAT	·	2.7 km	MPC · JPL
256323	2006 XQ_{7}	—	December 9, 2006	Kitt Peak	Spacewatch	·	1.7 km	MPC · JPL
256324	2006 XY_{11}	—	December 10, 2006	Kitt Peak	Spacewatch	·	2.8 km	MPC · JPL
256325	2006 XA_{18}	—	December 10, 2006	Kitt Peak	Spacewatch	·	2.9 km	MPC · JPL
256326	2006 XK_{18}	—	December 10, 2006	Kitt Peak	Spacewatch	·	1.9 km	MPC · JPL
256327	2006 XL_{18}	—	December 10, 2006	Kitt Peak	Spacewatch	·	1.8 km	MPC · JPL
256328	2006 XJ_{21}	—	December 12, 2006	Socorro	LINEAR	·	3.0 km	MPC · JPL
256329	2006 XD_{23}	—	December 12, 2006	Kitt Peak	Spacewatch	(12739)	2.3 km	MPC · JPL
256330	2006 XF_{25}	—	December 12, 2006	Mount Lemmon	Mount Lemmon Survey	·	2.0 km	MPC · JPL
256331	2006 XV_{25}	—	December 12, 2006	Catalina	CSS	·	2.2 km	MPC · JPL
256332	2006 XN_{26}	—	December 12, 2006	Catalina	CSS	·	1.8 km	MPC · JPL
256333	2006 XM_{27}	—	December 13, 2006	Kitt Peak	Spacewatch	·	2.9 km	MPC · JPL
256334	2006 XP_{27}	—	December 13, 2006	Kitt Peak	Spacewatch	·	3.9 km	MPC · JPL
256335	2006 XQ_{27}	—	December 13, 2006	Kitt Peak	Spacewatch	·	1.7 km	MPC · JPL
256336	2006 XS_{27}	—	December 13, 2006	Kitt Peak	Spacewatch	·	3.2 km	MPC · JPL
256337	2006 XS_{28}	—	December 13, 2006	Catalina	CSS	·	2.2 km	MPC · JPL
256338	2006 XR_{29}	—	December 13, 2006	Mount Lemmon	Mount Lemmon Survey	MAR	1.5 km	MPC · JPL
256339	2006 XM_{30}	—	December 13, 2006	Mount Lemmon	Mount Lemmon Survey	(5)	2.0 km	MPC · JPL
256340	2006 XP_{30}	—	December 13, 2006	Kitt Peak	Spacewatch	KOR	1.5 km	MPC · JPL
256341	2006 XO_{31}	—	December 10, 2006	Pla D'Arguines	R. Ferrando	·	1.4 km	MPC · JPL
256342	2006 XE_{34}	—	December 11, 2006	Kitt Peak	Spacewatch	HOF	5.2 km	MPC · JPL
256343	2006 XA_{36}	—	December 11, 2006	Catalina	CSS	·	2.5 km	MPC · JPL
256344	2006 XC_{37}	—	December 11, 2006	Kitt Peak	Spacewatch	·	1.7 km	MPC · JPL
256345	2006 XG_{39}	—	December 11, 2006	Kitt Peak	Spacewatch	·	2.8 km	MPC · JPL
256346	2006 XP_{40}	—	December 12, 2006	Kitt Peak	Spacewatch	AGN	1.6 km	MPC · JPL
256347	2006 XT_{42}	—	December 12, 2006	Mount Lemmon	Mount Lemmon Survey	KOR	1.9 km	MPC · JPL
256348	2006 XW_{42}	—	December 12, 2006	Mount Lemmon	Mount Lemmon Survey	·	2.2 km	MPC · JPL
256349	2006 XF_{43}	—	December 12, 2006	Mount Lemmon	Mount Lemmon Survey	·	4.5 km	MPC · JPL
256350	2006 XX_{45}	—	December 13, 2006	Catalina	CSS	·	2.0 km	MPC · JPL
256351	2006 XT_{47}	—	December 13, 2006	Kitt Peak	Spacewatch	EUN	1.9 km	MPC · JPL
256352	2006 XB_{48}	—	December 13, 2006	Socorro	LINEAR	MRX	1.5 km	MPC · JPL
256353	2006 XG_{54}	—	December 15, 2006	Socorro	LINEAR	·	3.7 km	MPC · JPL
256354	2006 XG_{55}	—	December 15, 2006	Catalina	CSS	(5)	1.9 km	MPC · JPL
256355	2006 XW_{55}	—	December 11, 2006	Socorro	LINEAR	·	5.0 km	MPC · JPL
256356	2006 XZ_{56}	—	December 13, 2006	Catalina	CSS	·	2.1 km	MPC · JPL
256357	2006 XH_{57}	—	December 14, 2006	Catalina	CSS	slow	2.2 km	MPC · JPL
256358	2006 XR_{57}	—	December 14, 2006	Mount Lemmon	Mount Lemmon Survey	·	2.4 km	MPC · JPL
256359	2006 XR_{58}	—	December 14, 2006	Kitt Peak	Spacewatch	·	2.3 km	MPC · JPL
256360	2006 XG_{59}	—	December 14, 2006	Kitt Peak	Spacewatch	·	2.8 km	MPC · JPL
256361	2006 XN_{59}	—	December 14, 2006	Kitt Peak	Spacewatch	DOR	2.4 km	MPC · JPL
256362	2006 XE_{64}	—	December 12, 2006	Palomar	NEAT	·	1.8 km	MPC · JPL
256363	2006 XL_{64}	—	December 12, 2006	Socorro	LINEAR	·	3.0 km	MPC · JPL
256364	2006 XW_{64}	—	December 12, 2006	Palomar	NEAT	·	1.3 km	MPC · JPL
256365	2006 XX_{64}	—	December 12, 2006	Palomar	NEAT	MAR	1.5 km	MPC · JPL
256366	2006 XF_{66}	—	December 12, 2006	Palomar	NEAT	·	3.7 km	MPC · JPL
256367	2006 XH_{67}	—	December 14, 2006	Palomar	NEAT	·	2.7 km	MPC · JPL
256368	2006 YV_{2}	—	December 22, 2006	7300	W. K. Y. Yeung	·	1.5 km	MPC · JPL
256369 Vilain	2006 YB_{3}	Vilain	December 20, 2006	Saint-Sulpice	B. Christophe	·	1.3 km	MPC · JPL
256370	2006 YS_{3}	—	December 16, 2006	Socorro	LINEAR	·	3.5 km	MPC · JPL
256371	2006 YA_{5}	—	December 17, 2006	Mount Lemmon	Mount Lemmon Survey	·	1.5 km	MPC · JPL
256372	2006 YV_{9}	—	December 21, 2006	Kitt Peak	Spacewatch	(5)	1.9 km	MPC · JPL
256373	2006 YD_{10}	—	December 21, 2006	Mount Lemmon	Mount Lemmon Survey	·	3.7 km	MPC · JPL
256374 Danielpequignot	2006 YZ_{13}	Danielpequignot	December 22, 2006	Saint-Sulpice	B. Christophe	·	2.2 km	MPC · JPL
256375	2006 YW_{14}	—	December 24, 2006	Kanab	Sheridan, E.	·	2.4 km	MPC · JPL
256376	2006 YM_{16}	—	December 21, 2006	Anderson Mesa	LONEOS	·	3.1 km	MPC · JPL
256377	2006 YZ_{16}	—	December 21, 2006	Mount Lemmon	Mount Lemmon Survey	HOF	2.9 km	MPC · JPL
256378	2006 YG_{18}	—	December 22, 2006	Socorro	LINEAR	·	2.5 km	MPC · JPL
256379	2006 YT_{18}	—	December 23, 2006	Mount Lemmon	Mount Lemmon Survey	·	2.9 km	MPC · JPL
256380	2006 YW_{25}	—	December 21, 2006	Kitt Peak	Spacewatch	·	2.7 km	MPC · JPL
256381	2006 YH_{26}	—	December 21, 2006	Kitt Peak	Spacewatch	KOR	1.6 km	MPC · JPL
256382	2006 YR_{26}	—	December 21, 2006	Kitt Peak	Spacewatch	HYG	3.9 km	MPC · JPL
256383	2006 YF_{34}	—	December 21, 2006	Kitt Peak	Spacewatch	·	2.6 km	MPC · JPL
256384	2006 YS_{35}	—	December 21, 2006	Kitt Peak	Spacewatch	·	1.9 km	MPC · JPL
256385	2006 YS_{37}	—	December 21, 2006	Kitt Peak	Spacewatch	·	3.0 km	MPC · JPL
256386	2006 YZ_{37}	—	December 21, 2006	Kitt Peak	Spacewatch	·	2.2 km	MPC · JPL
256387	2006 YH_{39}	—	December 22, 2006	Kitt Peak	Spacewatch	·	2.5 km	MPC · JPL
256388	2006 YE_{42}	—	December 22, 2006	Kitt Peak	Spacewatch	HOF	4.2 km	MPC · JPL
256389	2006 YU_{43}	—	December 25, 2006	Anderson Mesa	LONEOS	·	2.4 km	MPC · JPL
256390	2006 YS_{44}	—	December 26, 2006	Eskridge	Farpoint	·	3.3 km	MPC · JPL
256391	2006 YA_{45}	—	December 28, 2006	Marly	P. Kocher	AGN	1.9 km	MPC · JPL
256392	2006 YB_{50}	—	December 21, 2006	Kitt Peak	M. W. Buie	·	4.9 km	MPC · JPL
256393	2006 YH_{51}	—	December 24, 2006	Kitt Peak	Spacewatch	·	2.5 km	MPC · JPL
256394	2006 YL_{51}	—	December 27, 2006	Mount Lemmon	Mount Lemmon Survey	KOR	1.6 km	MPC · JPL
256395	2006 YA_{55}	—	December 21, 2006	Kitt Peak	Spacewatch	·	2.2 km	MPC · JPL
256396	2007 AZ_{1}	—	January 9, 2007	Mayhill	Lowe, A.	HNS	1.8 km	MPC · JPL
256397	2007 AD_{5}	—	January 8, 2007	Mount Lemmon	Mount Lemmon Survey	·	2.0 km	MPC · JPL
256398	2007 AT_{7}	—	January 9, 2007	Palomar	NEAT	·	4.2 km	MPC · JPL
256399	2007 AU_{7}	—	January 9, 2007	Palomar	NEAT	·	2.3 km	MPC · JPL
256400	2007 AS_{10}	—	January 10, 2007	Mount Lemmon	Mount Lemmon Survey	·	2.7 km	MPC · JPL

== 256401–256500 ==
back to top

Designation			Discovery			Properties		Ref
Permanent	Provisional	Named after	Date	Site	Discoverer(s)	Category	Diam.	Ref
256401	2007 AZ_{11}	—	January 15, 2007	Catalina	CSS	·	3.1 km	MPC · JPL
256402	2007 AR_{15}	—	January 10, 2007	Mount Lemmon	Mount Lemmon Survey	·	2.1 km	MPC · JPL
256403	2007 AJ_{16}	—	January 10, 2007	Mount Lemmon	Mount Lemmon Survey	·	2.0 km	MPC · JPL
256404	2007 AY_{17}	—	January 14, 2007	Mount Nyukasa	Japan Aerospace Exploration Agency	·	2.7 km	MPC · JPL
256405	2007 AJ_{18}	—	January 9, 2007	Catalina	CSS	·	2.2 km	MPC · JPL
256406	2007 AP_{18}	—	January 10, 2007	Catalina	CSS	EUN	1.8 km	MPC · JPL
256407	2007 AV_{18}	—	January 10, 2007	Socorro	LINEAR	·	1.8 km	MPC · JPL
256408	2007 AW_{18}	—	January 10, 2007	Catalina	CSS	·	2.4 km	MPC · JPL
256409	2007 AT_{22}	—	January 10, 2007	Catalina	CSS	·	3.9 km	MPC · JPL
256410	2007 AX_{25}	—	January 15, 2007	Anderson Mesa	LONEOS	GEF	2.0 km	MPC · JPL
256411	2007 AC_{28}	—	January 10, 2007	Mount Lemmon	Mount Lemmon Survey	·	2.6 km	MPC · JPL
256412	2007 BT_{2}	—	January 17, 2007	Catalina	CSS	AMO +1km	4.4 km	MPC · JPL
256413	2007 BJ_{6}	—	January 17, 2007	Palomar	NEAT	·	3.2 km	MPC · JPL
256414	2007 BG_{9}	—	January 17, 2007	Catalina	CSS	·	2.1 km	MPC · JPL
256415	2007 BT_{9}	—	January 17, 2007	Kitt Peak	Spacewatch	·	4.7 km	MPC · JPL
256416	2007 BV_{10}	—	January 17, 2007	Kitt Peak	Spacewatch	·	2.3 km	MPC · JPL
256417	2007 BY_{14}	—	January 17, 2007	Kitt Peak	Spacewatch	KOR	1.5 km	MPC · JPL
256418	2007 BE_{15}	—	January 17, 2007	Kitt Peak	Spacewatch	·	2.3 km	MPC · JPL
256419	2007 BH_{21}	—	January 24, 2007	Socorro	LINEAR	·	2.9 km	MPC · JPL
256420	2007 BJ_{22}	—	January 24, 2007	Socorro	LINEAR	·	2.0 km	MPC · JPL
256421	2007 BE_{23}	—	January 24, 2007	Mount Lemmon	Mount Lemmon Survey	KOR	1.4 km	MPC · JPL
256422	2007 BD_{34}	—	January 24, 2007	Mount Lemmon	Mount Lemmon Survey	KOR	2.0 km	MPC · JPL
256423	2007 BW_{36}	—	January 24, 2007	Catalina	CSS	·	5.3 km	MPC · JPL
256424	2007 BU_{44}	—	January 25, 2007	Catalina	CSS	·	1.9 km	MPC · JPL
256425	2007 BY_{46}	—	January 26, 2007	Kitt Peak	Spacewatch	·	3.4 km	MPC · JPL
256426	2007 BU_{49}	—	January 25, 2007	Catalina	CSS	·	3.3 km	MPC · JPL
256427	2007 BY_{53}	—	January 24, 2007	Kitt Peak	Spacewatch	THM	3.2 km	MPC · JPL
256428	2007 BQ_{55}	—	January 24, 2007	Socorro	LINEAR	EOS	3.1 km	MPC · JPL
256429	2007 BD_{61}	—	January 27, 2007	Mount Lemmon	Mount Lemmon Survey	HOF	3.1 km	MPC · JPL
256430	2007 BG_{69}	—	January 27, 2007	Mount Lemmon	Mount Lemmon Survey	·	2.2 km	MPC · JPL
256431	2007 BG_{73}	—	January 29, 2007	Cordell-Lorenz	Cordell-Lorenz	·	3.0 km	MPC · JPL
256432	2007 BD_{74}	—	January 17, 2007	Kitt Peak	Spacewatch	·	2.1 km	MPC · JPL
256433	2007 BS_{77}	—	January 27, 2007	Mount Lemmon	Mount Lemmon Survey	EOS	3.2 km	MPC · JPL
256434	2007 CJ	—	February 5, 2007	Palomar	NEAT	·	2.4 km	MPC · JPL
256435	2007 CH_{5}	—	February 7, 2007	Mayhill	Lowe, A.	·	2.1 km	MPC · JPL
256436	2007 CS_{10}	—	February 6, 2007	Mount Lemmon	Mount Lemmon Survey	·	2.6 km	MPC · JPL
256437	2007 CA_{12}	—	February 6, 2007	Kitt Peak	Spacewatch	·	2.2 km	MPC · JPL
256438	2007 CM_{14}	—	February 7, 2007	Mount Lemmon	Mount Lemmon Survey	KOR	1.3 km	MPC · JPL
256439	2007 CN_{15}	—	February 5, 2007	Palomar	NEAT	·	2.3 km	MPC · JPL
256440	2007 CJ_{16}	—	February 7, 2007	Kitt Peak	Spacewatch	·	1.8 km	MPC · JPL
256441	2007 CD_{22}	—	February 6, 2007	Mount Lemmon	Mount Lemmon Survey	·	2.8 km	MPC · JPL
256442	2007 CJ_{22}	—	February 6, 2007	Mount Lemmon	Mount Lemmon Survey	·	3.9 km	MPC · JPL
256443	2007 CK_{28}	—	February 6, 2007	Kitt Peak	Spacewatch	KOR	1.4 km	MPC · JPL
256444	2007 CG_{29}	—	February 6, 2007	Mount Lemmon	Mount Lemmon Survey	KOR	1.5 km	MPC · JPL
256445	2007 CC_{36}	—	February 6, 2007	Mount Lemmon	Mount Lemmon Survey	·	2.2 km	MPC · JPL
256446	2007 CM_{41}	—	February 7, 2007	Kitt Peak	Spacewatch	EOS	4.1 km	MPC · JPL
256447	2007 CQ_{41}	—	February 7, 2007	Kitt Peak	Spacewatch	·	5.4 km	MPC · JPL
256448	2007 CR_{41}	—	February 7, 2007	Kitt Peak	Spacewatch	EOS	2.3 km	MPC · JPL
256449	2007 CC_{43}	—	February 7, 2007	Mount Lemmon	Mount Lemmon Survey	·	2.4 km	MPC · JPL
256450	2007 CV_{44}	—	February 8, 2007	Palomar	NEAT	·	4.8 km	MPC · JPL
256451	2007 CQ_{46}	—	February 8, 2007	Palomar	NEAT	(5)	1.7 km	MPC · JPL
256452	2007 CN_{47}	—	February 9, 2007	Altschwendt	W. Ries	(16286)	2.3 km	MPC · JPL
256453	2007 CD_{49}	—	February 10, 2007	Mount Lemmon	Mount Lemmon Survey	·	2.2 km	MPC · JPL
256454	2007 CK_{53}	—	February 15, 2007	Catalina	CSS	·	2.6 km	MPC · JPL
256455	2007 CR_{53}	—	February 15, 2007	Palomar	NEAT	EOS	2.9 km	MPC · JPL
256456	2007 CX_{54}	—	February 15, 2007	Bergisch Gladbach	W. Bickel	·	4.5 km	MPC · JPL
256457	2007 CW_{57}	—	February 9, 2007	Catalina	CSS	·	2.6 km	MPC · JPL
256458	2007 CE_{60}	—	February 10, 2007	Catalina	CSS	EOS	3.1 km	MPC · JPL
256459	2007 CQ_{65}	—	February 8, 2007	Mount Lemmon	Mount Lemmon Survey	·	2.8 km	MPC · JPL
256460	2007 DL	—	February 17, 2007	Socorro	LINEAR	·	2.5 km	MPC · JPL
256461	2007 DV_{7}	—	February 18, 2007	Calvin-Rehoboth	Calvin College	·	3.4 km	MPC · JPL
256462	2007 DD_{12}	—	February 16, 2007	Palomar	NEAT	·	3.0 km	MPC · JPL
256463	2007 DJ_{12}	—	February 16, 2007	Palomar	NEAT	·	2.5 km	MPC · JPL
256464	2007 DU_{13}	—	February 17, 2007	Kitt Peak	Spacewatch	AGN	1.4 km	MPC · JPL
256465	2007 DE_{22}	—	February 17, 2007	Kitt Peak	Spacewatch	EOS	2.7 km	MPC · JPL
256466	2007 DF_{23}	—	February 17, 2007	Kitt Peak	Spacewatch	·	3.1 km	MPC · JPL
256467	2007 DU_{29}	—	February 17, 2007	Kitt Peak	Spacewatch	·	4.2 km	MPC · JPL
256468	2007 DK_{34}	—	February 17, 2007	Kitt Peak	Spacewatch	THM	2.6 km	MPC · JPL
256469	2007 DT_{34}	—	February 17, 2007	Kitt Peak	Spacewatch	·	4.6 km	MPC · JPL
256470	2007 DC_{36}	—	February 17, 2007	Kitt Peak	Spacewatch	·	3.9 km	MPC · JPL
256471	2007 DE_{38}	—	February 17, 2007	Kitt Peak	Spacewatch	·	2.2 km	MPC · JPL
256472	2007 DR_{45}	—	February 21, 2007	Kitt Peak	Spacewatch	·	2.9 km	MPC · JPL
256473	2007 DH_{49}	—	February 18, 2007	Charleston	Astronomical Research Observatory	·	2.4 km	MPC · JPL
256474	2007 DF_{55}	—	February 21, 2007	Socorro	LINEAR	·	4.4 km	MPC · JPL
256475	2007 DF_{57}	—	February 21, 2007	Mount Lemmon	Mount Lemmon Survey	EOS	2.2 km	MPC · JPL
256476	2007 DF_{61}	—	February 25, 2007	Desert Moon	Stevens, B. L.	·	3.5 km	MPC · JPL
256477	2007 DN_{64}	—	February 21, 2007	Kitt Peak	Spacewatch	·	3.2 km	MPC · JPL
256478	2007 DO_{93}	—	February 23, 2007	Kitt Peak	Spacewatch	EOS	2.8 km	MPC · JPL
256479	2007 DV_{93}	—	February 23, 2007	Kitt Peak	Spacewatch	·	3.5 km	MPC · JPL
256480	2007 DG_{95}	—	February 23, 2007	Kitt Peak	Spacewatch	·	5.8 km	MPC · JPL
256481	2007 DU_{101}	—	February 27, 2007	Eskridge	G. Hug	JUN	2.1 km	MPC · JPL
256482	2007 DV_{101}	—	February 24, 2007	Mount Nyukasa	Japan Aerospace Exploration Agency	HYG	3.3 km	MPC · JPL
256483	2007 DJ_{110}	—	February 17, 2007	Mount Lemmon	Mount Lemmon Survey	·	5.0 km	MPC · JPL
256484	2007 DN_{110}	—	February 17, 2007	Kitt Peak	Spacewatch	·	3.0 km	MPC · JPL
256485	2007 DK_{111}	—	February 25, 2007	Kitt Peak	Spacewatch	·	2.8 km	MPC · JPL
256486	2007 EN_{8}	—	March 9, 2007	Mount Lemmon	Mount Lemmon Survey	·	2.7 km	MPC · JPL
256487	2007 EP_{12}	—	March 9, 2007	Palomar	NEAT	·	2.9 km	MPC · JPL
256488	2007 EQ_{13}	—	March 9, 2007	Mount Lemmon	Mount Lemmon Survey	·	3.1 km	MPC · JPL
256489	2007 EJ_{14}	—	March 9, 2007	Palomar	NEAT	EOS	2.8 km	MPC · JPL
256490	2007 EZ_{14}	—	March 9, 2007	Mount Lemmon	Mount Lemmon Survey	·	3.4 km	MPC · JPL
256491	2007 EP_{17}	—	March 9, 2007	Mount Lemmon	Mount Lemmon Survey	·	5.1 km	MPC · JPL
256492	2007 EJ_{44}	—	March 9, 2007	Kitt Peak	Spacewatch	·	3.5 km	MPC · JPL
256493	2007 EZ_{45}	—	March 9, 2007	Mount Lemmon	Mount Lemmon Survey	·	1.9 km	MPC · JPL
256494	2007 EM_{47}	—	March 9, 2007	Mount Lemmon	Mount Lemmon Survey	·	3.5 km	MPC · JPL
256495	2007 EQ_{51}	—	March 11, 2007	Mount Lemmon	Mount Lemmon Survey	·	2.8 km	MPC · JPL
256496	2007 ES_{56}	—	March 10, 2007	Eskridge	G. Hug	·	4.5 km	MPC · JPL
256497	2007 ER_{57}	—	March 9, 2007	Catalina	CSS	THM	3.3 km	MPC · JPL
256498	2007 EN_{58}	—	March 9, 2007	Mount Lemmon	Mount Lemmon Survey	·	2.0 km	MPC · JPL
256499	2007 EH_{69}	—	March 10, 2007	Kitt Peak	Spacewatch	·	2.2 km	MPC · JPL
256500	2007 EW_{78}	—	March 10, 2007	Palomar	NEAT	THM	3.6 km	MPC · JPL

== 256501–256600 ==
back to top

Designation			Discovery			Properties		Ref
Permanent	Provisional	Named after	Date	Site	Discoverer(s)	Category	Diam.	Ref
256501	2007 ED_{83}	—	March 12, 2007	Kitt Peak	Spacewatch	·	3.4 km	MPC · JPL
256502	2007 ES_{88}	—	March 9, 2007	Kitt Peak	Spacewatch	·	3.0 km	MPC · JPL
256503	2007 EY_{89}	—	March 9, 2007	Mount Lemmon	Mount Lemmon Survey	·	2.7 km	MPC · JPL
256504	2007 EG_{92}	—	March 10, 2007	Kitt Peak	Spacewatch	THM	2.5 km	MPC · JPL
256505	2007 EY_{98}	—	March 11, 2007	Kitt Peak	Spacewatch	L5	12 km	MPC · JPL
256506	2007 ES_{99}	—	March 11, 2007	Kitt Peak	Spacewatch	·	2.9 km	MPC · JPL
256507	2007 EP_{105}	—	March 11, 2007	Mount Lemmon	Mount Lemmon Survey	HYG	3.6 km	MPC · JPL
256508	2007 EZ_{105}	—	March 11, 2007	Kitt Peak	Spacewatch	·	3.8 km	MPC · JPL
256509	2007 EH_{123}	—	March 14, 2007	Mount Lemmon	Mount Lemmon Survey	HOF	3.5 km	MPC · JPL
256510	2007 ER_{125}	—	March 11, 2007	Kitt Peak	Spacewatch	·	4.6 km	MPC · JPL
256511	2007 EU_{129}	—	March 9, 2007	Mount Lemmon	Mount Lemmon Survey	THM	3.4 km	MPC · JPL
256512	2007 EB_{137}	—	March 11, 2007	Kitt Peak	Spacewatch	·	2.3 km	MPC · JPL
256513	2007 ES_{156}	—	March 12, 2007	Kitt Peak	Spacewatch	·	5.0 km	MPC · JPL
256514	2007 EW_{156}	—	March 12, 2007	Kitt Peak	Spacewatch	·	4.3 km	MPC · JPL
256515	2007 EV_{165}	—	March 13, 2007	Črni Vrh	Mikuž, H.	·	4.5 km	MPC · JPL
256516	2007 EL_{166}	—	March 11, 2007	Kitt Peak	Spacewatch	·	3.4 km	MPC · JPL
256517	2007 ER_{172}	—	March 14, 2007	Kitt Peak	Spacewatch	·	4.0 km	MPC · JPL
256518	2007 EG_{181}	—	March 14, 2007	Kitt Peak	Spacewatch	·	4.6 km	MPC · JPL
256519	2007 EK_{188}	—	March 13, 2007	Mount Lemmon	Mount Lemmon Survey	HYG	3.4 km	MPC · JPL
256520	2007 EM_{200}	—	March 14, 2007	Anderson Mesa	LONEOS	CYB	6.6 km	MPC · JPL
256521	2007 EN_{204}	—	March 11, 2007	Kitt Peak	Spacewatch	·	3.2 km	MPC · JPL
256522	2007 EE_{207}	—	March 14, 2007	Catalina	CSS	·	6.4 km	MPC · JPL
256523	2007 EH_{212}	—	March 8, 2007	Palomar	NEAT	·	4.0 km	MPC · JPL
256524	2007 EB_{213}	—	March 11, 2007	Siding Spring	SSS	(5931)	6.3 km	MPC · JPL
256525	2007 EX_{213}	—	March 11, 2007	Mount Lemmon	Mount Lemmon Survey	(31811) ·	3.6 km	MPC · JPL
256526	2007 EF_{214}	—	March 13, 2007	Mount Lemmon	Mount Lemmon Survey	·	4.2 km	MPC · JPL
256527	2007 EA_{215}	—	March 14, 2007	Mount Lemmon	Mount Lemmon Survey	·	3.1 km	MPC · JPL
256528	2007 EZ_{219}	—	March 12, 2007	Mount Lemmon	Mount Lemmon Survey	·	4.8 km	MPC · JPL
256529	2007 FK	—	March 16, 2007	Mount Lemmon	Mount Lemmon Survey	CYB	4.3 km	MPC · JPL
256530	2007 FQ_{22}	—	March 20, 2007	Kitt Peak	Spacewatch	·	4.1 km	MPC · JPL
256531	2007 FR_{23}	—	March 20, 2007	Kitt Peak	Spacewatch	·	5.5 km	MPC · JPL
256532	2007 FO_{26}	—	March 20, 2007	Kitt Peak	Spacewatch	THM	2.2 km	MPC · JPL
256533	2007 FY_{26}	—	March 20, 2007	Kitt Peak	Spacewatch	THM	2.9 km	MPC · JPL
256534	2007 FA_{36}	—	March 26, 2007	Kitt Peak	Spacewatch	·	3.7 km	MPC · JPL
256535	2007 FV_{45}	—	March 16, 2007	Mount Lemmon	Mount Lemmon Survey	·	3.2 km	MPC · JPL
256536	2007 GK_{4}	—	April 11, 2007	Lulin	LUSS	·	6.0 km	MPC · JPL
256537 Zahn	2007 GX_{4}	Zahn	April 10, 2007	Saint-Sulpice	B. Christophe	·	4.2 km	MPC · JPL
256538	2007 GV_{9}	—	April 11, 2007	Kitt Peak	Spacewatch	·	4.1 km	MPC · JPL
256539	2007 GV_{12}	—	April 11, 2007	Kitt Peak	Spacewatch	·	3.8 km	MPC · JPL
256540	2007 GD_{15}	—	April 11, 2007	Mount Lemmon	Mount Lemmon Survey	·	3.6 km	MPC · JPL
256541	2007 GA_{28}	—	April 14, 2007	Catalina	CSS	·	6.2 km	MPC · JPL
256542	2007 GG_{54}	—	April 15, 2007	Kitt Peak	Spacewatch	T_{j} (2.99) · 3:2	7.4 km	MPC · JPL
256543	2007 GK_{61}	—	April 15, 2007	Kitt Peak	Spacewatch	·	4.0 km	MPC · JPL
256544	2007 GX_{71}	—	April 7, 2007	Mauna Kea	Mauna Kea	·	4.6 km	MPC · JPL
256545	2007 GO_{74}	—	April 11, 2007	Siding Spring	SSS	TIR	5.5 km	MPC · JPL
256546	2007 HC_{5}	—	April 17, 2007	Charleston	Astronomical Research Observatory	·	2.7 km	MPC · JPL
256547 Davidesmith	2007 HA_{15}	Davidesmith	April 22, 2007	Front Royal	Skillman, D. R.	EOS	3.0 km	MPC · JPL
256548	2007 HG_{70}	—	April 19, 2007	Kitt Peak	Spacewatch	TIR	5.3 km	MPC · JPL
256549	2007 HO_{82}	—	April 25, 2007	Kitt Peak	Spacewatch	·	5.4 km	MPC · JPL
256550	2007 LV_{14}	—	June 11, 2007	Mauna Kea	D. D. Balam	L4	10 km	MPC · JPL
256551	2007 OM_{3}	—	July 21, 2007	Tiki	S. F. Hönig, Teamo, N.	H	730 m	MPC · JPL
256552	2007 OU_{5}	—	July 22, 2007	Lulin	LUSS	V	750 m	MPC · JPL
256553	2007 PT_{4}	—	August 8, 2007	Charleston	Astronomical Research Observatory	L4 · (8060)	11 km	MPC · JPL
256554	2007 RG_{179}	—	September 10, 2007	Mount Lemmon	Mount Lemmon Survey	·	920 m	MPC · JPL
256555	2007 RU_{221}	—	September 14, 2007	Mount Lemmon	Mount Lemmon Survey	·	1.7 km	MPC · JPL
256556	2007 RD_{237}	—	September 14, 2007	Kitt Peak	Spacewatch	L4	10 km	MPC · JPL
256557	2007 RX_{239}	—	September 14, 2007	Catalina	CSS	·	4.1 km	MPC · JPL
256558	2007 RQ_{245}	—	September 11, 2007	Kitt Peak	Spacewatch	·	4.0 km	MPC · JPL
256559	2007 RR_{270}	—	September 15, 2007	Mount Lemmon	Mount Lemmon Survey	·	970 m	MPC · JPL
256560	2007 RU_{271}	—	September 15, 2007	Mount Lemmon	Mount Lemmon Survey	·	1.1 km	MPC · JPL
256561	2007 RR_{280}	—	September 13, 2007	Catalina	CSS	·	5.6 km	MPC · JPL
256562	2007 RS_{283}	—	September 2, 2007	Catalina	CSS	·	2.3 km	MPC · JPL
256563	2007 RZ_{285}	—	September 15, 2007	Mount Lemmon	Mount Lemmon Survey	V	810 m	MPC · JPL
256564	2007 RJ_{290}	—	September 10, 2007	Mount Lemmon	Mount Lemmon Survey	V	770 m	MPC · JPL
256565	2007 RC_{291}	—	September 14, 2007	Mount Lemmon	Mount Lemmon Survey	·	780 m	MPC · JPL
256566	2007 SH_{14}	—	September 20, 2007	Catalina	CSS	·	2.4 km	MPC · JPL
256567	2007 TC_{2}	—	October 4, 2007	Kitt Peak	Spacewatch	·	1.4 km	MPC · JPL
256568	2007 TY_{7}	—	October 7, 2007	Mayhill	Lowe, A.	·	1.1 km	MPC · JPL
256569	2007 TC_{9}	—	October 6, 2007	Bergisch Gladbach	W. Bickel	V	790 m	MPC · JPL
256570	2007 TH_{16}	—	October 7, 2007	Črni Vrh	Skvarč, J.	·	1.0 km	MPC · JPL
256571	2007 TK_{40}	—	October 6, 2007	Kitt Peak	Spacewatch	·	940 m	MPC · JPL
256572	2007 TE_{67}	—	October 6, 2007	Kitami	K. Endate	·	1.3 km	MPC · JPL
256573	2007 TP_{74}	—	October 10, 2007	Altschwendt	W. Ries	·	890 m	MPC · JPL
256574	2007 TV_{79}	—	October 6, 2007	Purple Mountain	PMO NEO Survey Program	·	800 m	MPC · JPL
256575	2007 TP_{128}	—	October 6, 2007	Kitt Peak	Spacewatch	·	1.0 km	MPC · JPL
256576	2007 TJ_{154}	—	October 9, 2007	Socorro	LINEAR	·	950 m	MPC · JPL
256577	2007 TB_{172}	—	October 13, 2007	Socorro	LINEAR	·	1.0 km	MPC · JPL
256578	2007 TT_{183}	—	October 9, 2007	Purple Mountain	PMO NEO Survey Program	·	1.1 km	MPC · JPL
256579	2007 TL_{232}	—	October 8, 2007	Kitt Peak	Spacewatch	·	1.1 km	MPC · JPL
256580	2007 TS_{232}	—	October 8, 2007	Kitt Peak	Spacewatch	·	950 m	MPC · JPL
256581	2007 TA_{233}	—	October 8, 2007	Kitt Peak	Spacewatch	·	1.2 km	MPC · JPL
256582	2007 TB_{236}	—	October 9, 2007	Mount Lemmon	Mount Lemmon Survey	·	3.3 km	MPC · JPL
256583	2007 TE_{262}	—	October 10, 2007	Kitt Peak	Spacewatch	·	880 m	MPC · JPL
256584	2007 TW_{330}	—	October 11, 2007	Kitt Peak	Spacewatch	·	1.2 km	MPC · JPL
256585	2007 TN_{383}	—	October 14, 2007	Kitt Peak	Spacewatch	·	1.2 km	MPC · JPL
256586	2007 TU_{392}	—	October 15, 2007	Catalina	CSS	·	800 m	MPC · JPL
256587	2007 TG_{398}	—	October 15, 2007	Mount Lemmon	Mount Lemmon Survey	·	1.3 km	MPC · JPL
256588	2007 TL_{398}	—	October 15, 2007	Kitt Peak	Spacewatch	·	890 m	MPC · JPL
256589	2007 TS_{429}	—	October 12, 2007	Kitt Peak	Spacewatch	·	4.7 km	MPC · JPL
256590	2007 TM_{432}	—	October 4, 2007	Kitt Peak	Spacewatch	NYS	1.4 km	MPC · JPL
256591	2007 TN_{440}	—	October 14, 2007	Mount Lemmon	Mount Lemmon Survey	NYS	1.5 km	MPC · JPL
256592	2007 UT_{34}	—	October 18, 2007	Kitt Peak	Spacewatch	·	820 m	MPC · JPL
256593	2007 UY_{37}	—	October 19, 2007	Kitt Peak	Spacewatch	·	920 m	MPC · JPL
256594	2007 UV_{44}	—	October 18, 2007	Mount Lemmon	Mount Lemmon Survey	·	950 m	MPC · JPL
256595	2007 UN_{53}	—	October 30, 2007	Kitt Peak	Spacewatch	·	1.2 km	MPC · JPL
256596	2007 UR_{53}	—	October 30, 2007	Kitt Peak	Spacewatch	·	1.5 km	MPC · JPL
256597	2007 US_{53}	—	October 30, 2007	Kitt Peak	Spacewatch	MIS	2.7 km	MPC · JPL
256598	2007 UL_{63}	—	October 30, 2007	Mount Lemmon	Mount Lemmon Survey	·	3.1 km	MPC · JPL
256599	2007 UJ_{91}	—	October 30, 2007	Mount Lemmon	Mount Lemmon Survey	·	700 m	MPC · JPL
256600	2007 UK_{105}	—	October 30, 2007	Kitt Peak	Spacewatch	·	1.0 km	MPC · JPL

== 256601–256700 ==
back to top

Designation			Discovery			Properties		Ref
Permanent	Provisional	Named after	Date	Site	Discoverer(s)	Category	Diam.	Ref
256601	2007 UO_{122}	—	October 30, 2007	Kitt Peak	Spacewatch	·	740 m	MPC · JPL
256602	2007 VO_{1}	—	November 2, 2007	Wrightwood	J. W. Young	·	1.0 km	MPC · JPL
256603	2007 VW_{30}	—	November 2, 2007	Kitt Peak	Spacewatch	·	1.2 km	MPC · JPL
256604	2007 VB_{35}	—	November 3, 2007	Kitt Peak	Spacewatch	·	710 m	MPC · JPL
256605	2007 VR_{43}	—	November 1, 2007	Kitt Peak	Spacewatch	·	840 m	MPC · JPL
256606	2007 VZ_{49}	—	November 1, 2007	Kitt Peak	Spacewatch	·	1.5 km	MPC · JPL
256607	2007 VW_{52}	—	November 1, 2007	Kitt Peak	Spacewatch	·	990 m	MPC · JPL
256608	2007 VT_{66}	—	November 2, 2007	Kitt Peak	Spacewatch	·	770 m	MPC · JPL
256609	2007 VB_{86}	—	November 2, 2007	Socorro	LINEAR	·	770 m	MPC · JPL
256610	2007 VN_{87}	—	November 2, 2007	Socorro	LINEAR	·	980 m	MPC · JPL
256611	2007 VZ_{89}	—	November 4, 2007	Socorro	LINEAR	·	700 m	MPC · JPL
256612	2007 VL_{97}	—	November 1, 2007	Kitt Peak	Spacewatch	·	750 m	MPC · JPL
256613	2007 VE_{98}	—	November 1, 2007	Lulin	LUSS	·	930 m	MPC · JPL
256614	2007 VY_{102}	—	November 3, 2007	Kitt Peak	Spacewatch	·	960 m	MPC · JPL
256615	2007 VB_{114}	—	November 3, 2007	Kitt Peak	Spacewatch	(2076)	880 m	MPC · JPL
256616	2007 VA_{119}	—	November 4, 2007	Kitt Peak	Spacewatch	·	900 m	MPC · JPL
256617	2007 VH_{155}	—	November 5, 2007	Kitt Peak	Spacewatch	·	980 m	MPC · JPL
256618	2007 VG_{156}	—	November 5, 2007	Kitt Peak	Spacewatch	·	720 m	MPC · JPL
256619	2007 VC_{157}	—	November 5, 2007	Kitt Peak	Spacewatch	·	710 m	MPC · JPL
256620	2007 VD_{165}	—	November 5, 2007	Kitt Peak	Spacewatch	·	1.0 km	MPC · JPL
256621	2007 VO_{183}	—	November 8, 2007	Mount Lemmon	Mount Lemmon Survey	·	850 m	MPC · JPL
256622	2007 VP_{191}	—	November 4, 2007	Mount Lemmon	Mount Lemmon Survey	·	1.6 km	MPC · JPL
256623	2007 VM_{192}	—	November 4, 2007	Mount Lemmon	Mount Lemmon Survey	·	690 m	MPC · JPL
256624	2007 VB_{193}	—	November 4, 2007	Mount Lemmon	Mount Lemmon Survey	·	2.3 km	MPC · JPL
256625	2007 VJ_{211}	—	November 9, 2007	Kitt Peak	Spacewatch	·	1.6 km	MPC · JPL
256626	2007 VV_{221}	—	November 12, 2007	Dauban	Chante-Perdrix	·	1.2 km	MPC · JPL
256627	2007 VQ_{228}	—	November 12, 2007	Mount Lemmon	Mount Lemmon Survey	·	2.6 km	MPC · JPL
256628	2007 VB_{232}	—	November 7, 2007	Kitt Peak	Spacewatch	·	780 m	MPC · JPL
256629	2007 VC_{232}	—	November 7, 2007	Kitt Peak	Spacewatch	·	900 m	MPC · JPL
256630	2007 VL_{234}	—	November 9, 2007	Kitt Peak	Spacewatch	·	760 m	MPC · JPL
256631	2007 VX_{236}	—	November 11, 2007	Mount Lemmon	Mount Lemmon Survey	·	790 m	MPC · JPL
256632	2007 VG_{241}	—	November 11, 2007	Mount Lemmon	Mount Lemmon Survey	MAS	930 m	MPC · JPL
256633	2007 VH_{270}	—	November 15, 2007	Socorro	LINEAR	·	1.6 km	MPC · JPL
256634	2007 VK_{270}	—	November 15, 2007	Socorro	LINEAR	·	1.1 km	MPC · JPL
256635	2007 VA_{282}	—	November 14, 2007	Kitt Peak	Spacewatch	·	960 m	MPC · JPL
256636	2007 VJ_{291}	—	November 14, 2007	Kitt Peak	Spacewatch	·	1.2 km	MPC · JPL
256637	2007 VA_{306}	—	November 7, 2007	Mount Lemmon	Mount Lemmon Survey	·	2.0 km	MPC · JPL
256638	2007 VR_{307}	—	November 3, 2007	Mount Lemmon	Mount Lemmon Survey	·	970 m	MPC · JPL
256639	2007 VR_{312}	—	November 2, 2007	Mount Lemmon	Mount Lemmon Survey	·	910 m	MPC · JPL
256640	2007 VR_{313}	—	November 11, 2007	Mount Lemmon	Mount Lemmon Survey	·	900 m	MPC · JPL
256641	2007 VH_{316}	—	November 3, 2007	Mount Lemmon	Mount Lemmon Survey	·	1.4 km	MPC · JPL
256642	2007 VN_{316}	—	November 5, 2007	Mount Lemmon	Mount Lemmon Survey	·	1.3 km	MPC · JPL
256643	2007 VB_{321}	—	November 4, 2007	Mount Lemmon	Mount Lemmon Survey	·	740 m	MPC · JPL
256644	2007 VM_{328}	—	November 8, 2007	Kitt Peak	Spacewatch	·	1.2 km	MPC · JPL
256645	2007 VQ_{333}	—	November 11, 2007	Mount Lemmon	Mount Lemmon Survey	MAS	860 m	MPC · JPL
256646	2007 WJ_{4}	—	November 18, 2007	Bisei SG Center	BATTeRS	·	2.5 km	MPC · JPL
256647	2007 WR_{7}	—	November 18, 2007	Socorro	LINEAR	·	820 m	MPC · JPL
256648	2007 WJ_{16}	—	November 18, 2007	Mount Lemmon	Mount Lemmon Survey	EOS	2.8 km	MPC · JPL
256649	2007 WG_{39}	—	November 19, 2007	Mount Lemmon	Mount Lemmon Survey	·	1.3 km	MPC · JPL
256650	2007 WO_{54}	—	November 19, 2007	Mount Lemmon	Mount Lemmon Survey	·	810 m	MPC · JPL
256651	2007 WZ_{57}	—	November 19, 2007	Mount Lemmon	Mount Lemmon Survey	MAS	890 m	MPC · JPL
256652	2007 WW_{59}	—	November 19, 2007	Mount Lemmon	Mount Lemmon Survey	·	1.6 km	MPC · JPL
256653	2007 XM_{10}	—	December 3, 2007	Eskridge	G. Hug	·	960 m	MPC · JPL
256654	2007 XC_{15}	—	December 5, 2007	Bisei SG Center	BATTeRS	·	1.1 km	MPC · JPL
256655	2007 XV_{16}	—	December 11, 2007	Great Shefford	Birtwhistle, P.	·	760 m	MPC · JPL
256656	2007 XK_{17}	—	December 6, 2007	Socorro	LINEAR	(2076)	1.1 km	MPC · JPL
256657	2007 XO_{20}	—	December 13, 2007	Costitx	OAM	·	1.2 km	MPC · JPL
256658	2007 XG_{21}	—	December 14, 2007	Costitx	OAM	·	1.4 km	MPC · JPL
256659	2007 XL_{21}	—	December 10, 2007	Socorro	LINEAR	·	940 m	MPC · JPL
256660	2007 XX_{21}	—	December 10, 2007	Socorro	LINEAR	·	1.1 km	MPC · JPL
256661	2007 XD_{22}	—	December 10, 2007	Socorro	LINEAR	·	730 m	MPC · JPL
256662	2007 XT_{26}	—	December 14, 2007	Kitt Peak	Spacewatch	·	1.1 km	MPC · JPL
256663	2007 XT_{27}	—	December 14, 2007	Mount Lemmon	Mount Lemmon Survey	·	1.3 km	MPC · JPL
256664	2007 XY_{27}	—	December 14, 2007	Mount Lemmon	Mount Lemmon Survey	·	1.1 km	MPC · JPL
256665	2007 XX_{32}	—	December 15, 2007	Kitt Peak	Spacewatch	·	1.6 km	MPC · JPL
256666	2007 XB_{33}	—	December 15, 2007	Mount Lemmon	Mount Lemmon Survey	·	780 m	MPC · JPL
256667	2007 XD_{33}	—	December 15, 2007	Kitt Peak	Spacewatch	·	2.8 km	MPC · JPL
256668	2007 XJ_{53}	—	December 14, 2007	Mount Lemmon	Mount Lemmon Survey	·	990 m	MPC · JPL
256669	2007 XN_{53}	—	December 14, 2007	Mount Lemmon	Mount Lemmon Survey	·	800 m	MPC · JPL
256670	2007 XT_{58}	—	December 14, 2007	Socorro	LINEAR	AMO +1km	810 m	MPC · JPL
256671	2007 YW_{9}	—	December 16, 2007	Mount Lemmon	Mount Lemmon Survey	MAR	1.4 km	MPC · JPL
256672	2007 YB_{15}	—	December 16, 2007	Socorro	LINEAR	EUN	1.9 km	MPC · JPL
256673	2007 YG_{15}	—	December 16, 2007	Kitt Peak	Spacewatch	·	1.2 km	MPC · JPL
256674	2007 YQ_{16}	—	December 16, 2007	Kitt Peak	Spacewatch	·	740 m	MPC · JPL
256675	2007 YE_{19}	—	December 16, 2007	Kitt Peak	Spacewatch	·	910 m	MPC · JPL
256676	2007 YU_{24}	—	December 18, 2007	Kitt Peak	Spacewatch	NYS	1.3 km	MPC · JPL
256677	2007 YT_{27}	—	December 18, 2007	Kitt Peak	Spacewatch	·	880 m	MPC · JPL
256678	2007 YZ_{31}	—	December 30, 2007	Socorro	LINEAR	·	1.3 km	MPC · JPL
256679	2007 YD_{37}	—	December 30, 2007	Mount Lemmon	Mount Lemmon Survey	·	880 m	MPC · JPL
256680	2007 YK_{42}	—	December 30, 2007	Catalina	CSS	·	980 m	MPC · JPL
256681	2007 YQ_{44}	—	December 30, 2007	Kitt Peak	Spacewatch	·	1.9 km	MPC · JPL
256682	2007 YT_{46}	—	December 30, 2007	Catalina	CSS	·	2.1 km	MPC · JPL
256683	2007 YU_{46}	—	December 30, 2007	Mount Lemmon	Mount Lemmon Survey	·	1.1 km	MPC · JPL
256684	2007 YD_{47}	—	December 30, 2007	Mount Lemmon	Mount Lemmon Survey	MAS	580 m	MPC · JPL
256685	2007 YX_{51}	—	December 30, 2007	Kitt Peak	Spacewatch	V	1.1 km	MPC · JPL
256686	2007 YZ_{54}	—	December 31, 2007	Catalina	CSS	·	1.4 km	MPC · JPL
256687	2007 YV_{55}	—	December 31, 2007	Mount Lemmon	Mount Lemmon Survey	NYS	1.3 km	MPC · JPL
256688	2007 YF_{63}	—	December 31, 2007	Mount Lemmon	Mount Lemmon Survey	PHO	1.9 km	MPC · JPL
256689	2007 YS_{64}	—	December 18, 2007	Mount Lemmon	Mount Lemmon Survey	·	1.4 km	MPC · JPL
256690	2007 YO_{66}	—	December 30, 2007	Kitt Peak	Spacewatch	·	1.4 km	MPC · JPL
256691	2007 YS_{66}	—	December 30, 2007	Mount Lemmon	Mount Lemmon Survey	·	1.2 km	MPC · JPL
256692	2007 YL_{68}	—	December 31, 2007	Mount Lemmon	Mount Lemmon Survey	·	1.1 km	MPC · JPL
256693	2007 YH_{74}	—	December 31, 2007	Catalina	CSS	·	1.5 km	MPC · JPL
256694	2007 YK_{74}	—	December 31, 2007	Mount Lemmon	Mount Lemmon Survey	·	1.7 km	MPC · JPL
256695	2007 YQ_{74}	—	December 18, 2007	Mount Lemmon	Mount Lemmon Survey	·	3.2 km	MPC · JPL
256696	2008 AS_{1}	—	January 7, 2008	Wildberg	R. Apitzsch	·	1.1 km	MPC · JPL
256697 Nahapetov	2008 AZ_{1}	Nahapetov	January 6, 2008	Zelenchukskaya Stn	T. V. Krjačko	·	2.0 km	MPC · JPL
256698 Zhuzhixin	2008 AX_{2}	Zhuzhixin	January 7, 2008	Mount Lulin	LUSS	·	1.6 km	MPC · JPL
256699 Poudai	2008 AZ_{2}	Poudai	January 7, 2008	Lulin	Q. Ye, Lin, H.-C.	·	2.2 km	MPC · JPL
256700	2008 AG_{3}	—	January 8, 2008	Dauban	Kugel, F.	·	1.5 km	MPC · JPL

== 256701–256800 ==
back to top

Designation			Discovery			Properties		Ref
Permanent	Provisional	Named after	Date	Site	Discoverer(s)	Category	Diam.	Ref
256701	2008 AA_{4}	—	January 8, 2008	Dauban	Kugel, F.	(2076)	900 m	MPC · JPL
256702	2008 AJ_{4}	—	January 7, 2008	Lulin	LUSS	·	850 m	MPC · JPL
256703	2008 AJ_{7}	—	January 10, 2008	Kitt Peak	Spacewatch	·	1.7 km	MPC · JPL
256704	2008 AA_{10}	—	January 10, 2008	Mount Lemmon	Mount Lemmon Survey	·	2.2 km	MPC · JPL
256705	2008 AR_{10}	—	January 10, 2008	Mount Lemmon	Mount Lemmon Survey	·	2.1 km	MPC · JPL
256706	2008 AT_{20}	—	January 10, 2008	Mount Lemmon	Mount Lemmon Survey	·	870 m	MPC · JPL
256707	2008 AU_{21}	—	January 10, 2008	Mount Lemmon	Mount Lemmon Survey	·	1.5 km	MPC · JPL
256708	2008 AA_{28}	—	January 10, 2008	Mount Lemmon	Mount Lemmon Survey	ERI	1.9 km	MPC · JPL
256709	2008 AX_{33}	—	January 9, 2008	Lulin	LUSS	NYS	1.7 km	MPC · JPL
256710	2008 AD_{35}	—	January 10, 2008	Kitt Peak	Spacewatch	·	810 m	MPC · JPL
256711	2008 AD_{37}	—	January 10, 2008	Kitt Peak	Spacewatch	NYS	1.7 km	MPC · JPL
256712	2008 AB_{43}	—	January 10, 2008	Mount Lemmon	Mount Lemmon Survey	·	2.3 km	MPC · JPL
256713	2008 AZ_{43}	—	January 10, 2008	Kitt Peak	Spacewatch	·	1.6 km	MPC · JPL
256714	2008 AO_{44}	—	January 10, 2008	Kitt Peak	Spacewatch	·	1.0 km	MPC · JPL
256715	2008 AF_{47}	—	January 11, 2008	Kitt Peak	Spacewatch	NYS	1.5 km	MPC · JPL
256716	2008 AV_{51}	—	January 11, 2008	Kitt Peak	Spacewatch	·	1.5 km	MPC · JPL
256717	2008 AA_{57}	—	January 11, 2008	Kitt Peak	Spacewatch	·	1.7 km	MPC · JPL
256718	2008 AB_{57}	—	January 11, 2008	Kitt Peak	Spacewatch	NYS	1.5 km	MPC · JPL
256719	2008 AJ_{63}	—	January 11, 2008	Mount Lemmon	Mount Lemmon Survey	·	760 m	MPC · JPL
256720	2008 AC_{65}	—	January 11, 2008	Mount Lemmon	Mount Lemmon Survey	V	780 m	MPC · JPL
256721	2008 AH_{66}	—	January 11, 2008	Kitt Peak	Spacewatch	·	1.4 km	MPC · JPL
256722	2008 AX_{66}	—	January 11, 2008	Kitt Peak	Spacewatch	·	2.3 km	MPC · JPL
256723	2008 AT_{73}	—	January 10, 2008	Mount Lemmon	Mount Lemmon Survey	·	990 m	MPC · JPL
256724	2008 AC_{76}	—	January 11, 2008	Kitt Peak	Spacewatch	·	1.5 km	MPC · JPL
256725	2008 AQ_{93}	—	January 14, 2008	Kitt Peak	Spacewatch	V	980 m	MPC · JPL
256726	2008 AK_{102}	—	January 13, 2008	Mount Lemmon	Mount Lemmon Survey	·	1.0 km	MPC · JPL
256727	2008 AC_{110}	—	January 15, 2008	Kitt Peak	Spacewatch	·	1.2 km	MPC · JPL
256728	2008 AE_{110}	—	January 15, 2008	Kitt Peak	Spacewatch	·	1.5 km	MPC · JPL
256729	2008 AW_{113}	—	January 9, 2008	Mount Lemmon	Mount Lemmon Survey	·	2.9 km	MPC · JPL
256730	2008 AG_{116}	—	January 11, 2008	Mount Lemmon	Mount Lemmon Survey	·	4.1 km	MPC · JPL
256731	2008 AN_{127}	—	January 10, 2008	Kitt Peak	Spacewatch	·	1.6 km	MPC · JPL
256732	2008 AN_{129}	—	January 12, 2008	Catalina	CSS	·	1.9 km	MPC · JPL
256733	2008 AA_{135}	—	January 10, 2008	Mount Lemmon	Mount Lemmon Survey	·	2.3 km	MPC · JPL
256734	2008 AA_{137}	—	January 14, 2008	Kitt Peak	Spacewatch	·	1.6 km	MPC · JPL
256735	2008 AD_{137}	—	January 15, 2008	Socorro	LINEAR	V	840 m	MPC · JPL
256736	2008 BK_{4}	—	January 16, 2008	Kitt Peak	Spacewatch	·	1.3 km	MPC · JPL
256737	2008 BL_{9}	—	January 16, 2008	Kitt Peak	Spacewatch	·	1.9 km	MPC · JPL
256738	2008 BT_{9}	—	January 16, 2008	Kitt Peak	Spacewatch	·	2.1 km	MPC · JPL
256739	2008 BU_{15}	—	January 28, 2008	Lulin	LUSS	·	1.8 km	MPC · JPL
256740	2008 BL_{18}	—	January 30, 2008	Catalina	CSS	·	1.7 km	MPC · JPL
256741	2008 BK_{20}	—	January 30, 2008	Catalina	CSS	·	1.0 km	MPC · JPL
256742	2008 BJ_{21}	—	January 30, 2008	Mount Lemmon	Mount Lemmon Survey	MAS	780 m	MPC · JPL
256743	2008 BL_{22}	—	January 31, 2008	Mount Lemmon	Mount Lemmon Survey	·	1.5 km	MPC · JPL
256744	2008 BT_{22}	—	January 31, 2008	Mount Lemmon	Mount Lemmon Survey	·	3.1 km	MPC · JPL
256745	2008 BO_{23}	—	January 31, 2008	Mount Lemmon	Mount Lemmon Survey	·	2.5 km	MPC · JPL
256746	2008 BK_{24}	—	January 30, 2008	Kitt Peak	Spacewatch	·	1.9 km	MPC · JPL
256747	2008 BD_{29}	—	January 30, 2008	Mount Lemmon	Mount Lemmon Survey	·	2.0 km	MPC · JPL
256748	2008 BX_{29}	—	January 30, 2008	Catalina	CSS	·	800 m	MPC · JPL
256749	2008 BZ_{29}	—	January 30, 2008	Catalina	CSS	NYS	1.9 km	MPC · JPL
256750	2008 BD_{30}	—	January 30, 2008	Catalina	CSS	·	1.6 km	MPC · JPL
256751	2008 BD_{32}	—	January 30, 2008	Mount Lemmon	Mount Lemmon Survey	·	1.1 km	MPC · JPL
256752	2008 BG_{32}	—	January 30, 2008	Catalina	CSS	·	930 m	MPC · JPL
256753	2008 BF_{34}	—	January 30, 2008	Catalina	CSS	·	3.0 km	MPC · JPL
256754	2008 BH_{34}	—	January 30, 2008	Mount Lemmon	Mount Lemmon Survey	EUN	1.5 km	MPC · JPL
256755	2008 BZ_{34}	—	January 30, 2008	Mount Lemmon	Mount Lemmon Survey	·	4.0 km	MPC · JPL
256756	2008 BT_{35}	—	January 30, 2008	Kitt Peak	Spacewatch	(5)	2.0 km	MPC · JPL
256757	2008 BN_{37}	—	January 31, 2008	Catalina	CSS	·	1.8 km	MPC · JPL
256758	2008 BU_{37}	—	January 31, 2008	Catalina	CSS	·	750 m	MPC · JPL
256759	2008 BP_{38}	—	January 31, 2008	Mount Lemmon	Mount Lemmon Survey	·	2.1 km	MPC · JPL
256760	2008 BA_{39}	—	January 31, 2008	Mount Lemmon	Mount Lemmon Survey	·	4.0 km	MPC · JPL
256761	2008 BB_{40}	—	January 30, 2008	Catalina	CSS	·	1.0 km	MPC · JPL
256762	2008 BY_{42}	—	January 28, 2008	La Sagra	OAM	·	930 m	MPC · JPL
256763	2008 BB_{46}	—	January 30, 2008	Mount Lemmon	Mount Lemmon Survey	·	1.0 km	MPC · JPL
256764	2008 BN_{46}	—	January 30, 2008	Mount Lemmon	Mount Lemmon Survey	·	2.5 km	MPC · JPL
256765	2008 BY_{46}	—	January 30, 2008	Mount Lemmon	Mount Lemmon Survey	HNS	1.5 km	MPC · JPL
256766	2008 BJ_{47}	—	January 20, 2008	Mount Lemmon	Mount Lemmon Survey	ADE	2.3 km	MPC · JPL
256767	2008 BT_{47}	—	January 30, 2008	Mount Lemmon	Mount Lemmon Survey	·	1.4 km	MPC · JPL
256768	2008 BU_{47}	—	January 30, 2008	Mount Lemmon	Mount Lemmon Survey	·	1.8 km	MPC · JPL
256769	2008 BM_{48}	—	January 20, 2008	Mount Lemmon	Mount Lemmon Survey	MAS	660 m	MPC · JPL
256770	2008 BP_{50}	—	January 30, 2008	Mount Lemmon	Mount Lemmon Survey	·	2.1 km	MPC · JPL
256771	2008 BD_{51}	—	January 20, 2008	Mount Lemmon	Mount Lemmon Survey	·	1.5 km	MPC · JPL
256772	2008 BG_{51}	—	January 16, 2008	Socorro	LINEAR	·	930 m	MPC · JPL
256773	2008 CP_{1}	—	February 2, 2008	Kitami	K. Endate	·	1.4 km	MPC · JPL
256774	2008 CV_{1}	—	February 3, 2008	Bisei SG Center	BATTeRS	(2076)	1.0 km	MPC · JPL
256775	2008 CM_{4}	—	February 2, 2008	Mount Lemmon	Mount Lemmon Survey	·	2.6 km	MPC · JPL
256776	2008 CF_{5}	—	February 4, 2008	Uccle	T. Pauwels	·	1.6 km	MPC · JPL
256777	2008 CF_{7}	—	February 1, 2008	Kitt Peak	Spacewatch	·	1.6 km	MPC · JPL
256778	2008 CT_{10}	—	February 3, 2008	Catalina	CSS	V	1.1 km	MPC · JPL
256779	2008 CP_{11}	—	February 3, 2008	Kitt Peak	Spacewatch	·	1.8 km	MPC · JPL
256780	2008 CN_{14}	—	February 3, 2008	Kitt Peak	Spacewatch	V	1.0 km	MPC · JPL
256781	2008 CS_{15}	—	February 3, 2008	Kitt Peak	Spacewatch	(5)	1.7 km	MPC · JPL
256782	2008 CR_{16}	—	February 3, 2008	Kitt Peak	Spacewatch	MAS	660 m	MPC · JPL
256783	2008 CD_{18}	—	February 3, 2008	Kitt Peak	Spacewatch	·	2.5 km	MPC · JPL
256784	2008 CZ_{18}	—	February 3, 2008	Kitt Peak	Spacewatch	·	850 m	MPC · JPL
256785	2008 CG_{19}	—	February 3, 2008	Kitt Peak	Spacewatch	·	2.2 km	MPC · JPL
256786	2008 CN_{19}	—	February 6, 2008	Catalina	CSS	·	1.1 km	MPC · JPL
256787	2008 CK_{23}	—	February 1, 2008	Kitt Peak	Spacewatch	·	760 m	MPC · JPL
256788	2008 CF_{43}	—	February 2, 2008	Kitt Peak	Spacewatch	·	1.5 km	MPC · JPL
256789	2008 CY_{45}	—	February 2, 2008	Catalina	CSS	ERI	2.5 km	MPC · JPL
256790	2008 CC_{47}	—	February 3, 2008	Kitt Peak	Spacewatch	·	1.5 km	MPC · JPL
256791	2008 CO_{48}	—	February 3, 2008	Kitt Peak	Spacewatch	·	2.6 km	MPC · JPL
256792	2008 CD_{49}	—	February 6, 2008	Catalina	CSS	ERI	2.7 km	MPC · JPL
256793	2008 CX_{50}	—	February 6, 2008	Kitt Peak	Spacewatch	V	720 m	MPC · JPL
256794	2008 CM_{65}	—	February 8, 2008	Kitt Peak	Spacewatch	·	1.5 km	MPC · JPL
256795 Suzyzahn	2008 CS_{68}	Suzyzahn	February 7, 2008	Saint-Sulpice	B. Christophe	·	2.7 km	MPC · JPL
256796 Almanzor	2008 CN_{69}	Almanzor	February 8, 2008	La Cañada	Lacruz, J.	·	1.1 km	MPC · JPL
256797 Benbow	2008 CA_{70}	Benbow	February 9, 2008	La Cañada	Lacruz, J.	·	890 m	MPC · JPL
256798	2008 CQ_{71}	—	February 7, 2008	Catalina	CSS	RAF	1.4 km	MPC · JPL
256799	2008 CT_{71}	—	February 7, 2008	Catalina	CSS	BRA	2.6 km	MPC · JPL
256800	2008 CG_{76}	—	February 3, 2008	Kitt Peak	Spacewatch	·	2.4 km	MPC · JPL

== 256801–256900 ==
back to top

Designation			Discovery			Properties		Ref
Permanent	Provisional	Named after	Date	Site	Discoverer(s)	Category	Diam.	Ref
256801	2008 CJ_{83}	—	February 7, 2008	Kitt Peak	Spacewatch	·	2.2 km	MPC · JPL
256802	2008 CU_{83}	—	February 7, 2008	Kitt Peak	Spacewatch	V	880 m	MPC · JPL
256803	2008 CO_{85}	—	February 7, 2008	Kitt Peak	Spacewatch	·	4.4 km	MPC · JPL
256804	2008 CE_{87}	—	February 7, 2008	Mount Lemmon	Mount Lemmon Survey	·	2.1 km	MPC · JPL
256805	2008 CL_{92}	—	February 8, 2008	Kitt Peak	Spacewatch	NYS	1.4 km	MPC · JPL
256806	2008 CR_{92}	—	February 8, 2008	Kitt Peak	Spacewatch	NYS	1.5 km	MPC · JPL
256807	2008 CS_{92}	—	February 8, 2008	Kitt Peak	Spacewatch	·	1.3 km	MPC · JPL
256808	2008 CV_{92}	—	February 8, 2008	Kitt Peak	Spacewatch	·	2.7 km	MPC · JPL
256809	2008 CD_{108}	—	February 9, 2008	Mount Lemmon	Mount Lemmon Survey	·	2.8 km	MPC · JPL
256810	2008 CZ_{109}	—	February 9, 2008	Kitt Peak	Spacewatch	·	4.9 km	MPC · JPL
256811	2008 CA_{111}	—	February 10, 2008	Kitt Peak	Spacewatch	MAR	1.4 km	MPC · JPL
256812	2008 CU_{114}	—	February 10, 2008	Mount Lemmon	Mount Lemmon Survey	PAD	1.7 km	MPC · JPL
256813 Marburg	2008 CW_{116}	Marburg	February 11, 2008	Taunus	E. Schwab, R. Kling	·	2.6 km	MPC · JPL
256814	2008 CT_{118}	—	February 11, 2008	Junk Bond	D. Healy	TEL	1.6 km	MPC · JPL
256815	2008 CQ_{120}	—	February 6, 2008	Catalina	CSS	·	990 m	MPC · JPL
256816	2008 CV_{120}	—	February 6, 2008	Anderson Mesa	LONEOS	·	1.8 km	MPC · JPL
256817	2008 CB_{121}	—	February 6, 2008	Purple Mountain	PMO NEO Survey Program	·	4.3 km	MPC · JPL
256818	2008 CG_{123}	—	February 7, 2008	Mount Lemmon	Mount Lemmon Survey	·	1.5 km	MPC · JPL
256819	2008 CH_{132}	—	February 8, 2008	Kitt Peak	Spacewatch	·	4.2 km	MPC · JPL
256820	2008 CQ_{135}	—	February 8, 2008	Mount Lemmon	Mount Lemmon Survey	·	2.3 km	MPC · JPL
256821	2008 CV_{135}	—	February 8, 2008	Kitt Peak	Spacewatch	AGN	1.5 km	MPC · JPL
256822	2008 CL_{136}	—	February 8, 2008	Mount Lemmon	Mount Lemmon Survey	·	1.1 km	MPC · JPL
256823	2008 CA_{141}	—	February 8, 2008	Kitt Peak	Spacewatch	·	2.1 km	MPC · JPL
256824	2008 CH_{141}	—	February 8, 2008	Kitt Peak	Spacewatch	NYS	1.5 km	MPC · JPL
256825	2008 CN_{141}	—	February 8, 2008	Kitt Peak	Spacewatch	·	2.5 km	MPC · JPL
256826	2008 CU_{142}	—	February 8, 2008	Kitt Peak	Spacewatch	·	2.7 km	MPC · JPL
256827	2008 CJ_{143}	—	February 8, 2008	Kitt Peak	Spacewatch	WIT	1.2 km	MPC · JPL
256828	2008 CA_{144}	—	February 8, 2008	Kitt Peak	Spacewatch	(5)	2.3 km	MPC · JPL
256829	2008 CN_{144}	—	February 9, 2008	Kitt Peak	Spacewatch	MAS	780 m	MPC · JPL
256830	2008 CK_{145}	—	February 9, 2008	Kitt Peak	Spacewatch	·	1.4 km	MPC · JPL
256831	2008 CM_{147}	—	February 9, 2008	Kitt Peak	Spacewatch	·	1.1 km	MPC · JPL
256832	2008 CJ_{149}	—	February 9, 2008	Kitt Peak	Spacewatch	CLA	1.6 km	MPC · JPL
256833	2008 CV_{149}	—	February 9, 2008	Kitt Peak	Spacewatch	NEM	2.7 km	MPC · JPL
256834	2008 CV_{156}	—	February 9, 2008	Kitt Peak	Spacewatch	·	2.1 km	MPC · JPL
256835	2008 CX_{156}	—	February 9, 2008	Kitt Peak	Spacewatch	WIT	1.1 km	MPC · JPL
256836	2008 CF_{157}	—	February 9, 2008	Kitt Peak	Spacewatch	·	2.6 km	MPC · JPL
256837	2008 CL_{157}	—	February 9, 2008	Catalina	CSS	V	970 m	MPC · JPL
256838	2008 CB_{158}	—	February 9, 2008	Catalina	CSS	·	2.1 km	MPC · JPL
256839	2008 CN_{158}	—	February 9, 2008	Catalina	CSS	HNS	1.8 km	MPC · JPL
256840	2008 CQ_{158}	—	February 9, 2008	Kitt Peak	Spacewatch	NYS	1.2 km	MPC · JPL
256841	2008 CR_{158}	—	February 9, 2008	Kitt Peak	Spacewatch	·	3.6 km	MPC · JPL
256842	2008 CU_{160}	—	February 9, 2008	Kitt Peak	Spacewatch	·	5.5 km	MPC · JPL
256843	2008 CH_{162}	—	February 10, 2008	Catalina	CSS	V	890 m	MPC · JPL
256844	2008 CR_{163}	—	February 10, 2008	Catalina	CSS	MRX	1.3 km	MPC · JPL
256845	2008 CW_{168}	—	February 12, 2008	Mount Lemmon	Mount Lemmon Survey	·	1.8 km	MPC · JPL
256846	2008 CT_{169}	—	February 12, 2008	Mount Lemmon	Mount Lemmon Survey	·	1.0 km	MPC · JPL
256847	2008 CL_{175}	—	February 6, 2008	Socorro	LINEAR	·	1.4 km	MPC · JPL
256848	2008 CD_{176}	—	February 6, 2008	Socorro	LINEAR	EUN	2.2 km	MPC · JPL
256849	2008 CA_{180}	—	February 8, 2008	Catalina	CSS	EUP	7.8 km	MPC · JPL
256850	2008 CW_{180}	—	February 9, 2008	Catalina	CSS	·	1.8 km	MPC · JPL
256851	2008 CV_{182}	—	February 11, 2008	Mount Lemmon	Mount Lemmon Survey	·	1.6 km	MPC · JPL
256852	2008 CB_{195}	—	February 13, 2008	Mount Lemmon	Mount Lemmon Survey	KOR	1.7 km	MPC · JPL
256853	2008 CA_{196}	—	February 1, 2008	Kitt Peak	Spacewatch	·	2.2 km	MPC · JPL
256854	2008 CM_{197}	—	February 8, 2008	Mount Lemmon	Mount Lemmon Survey	·	2.5 km	MPC · JPL
256855	2008 CA_{198}	—	February 10, 2008	Mount Lemmon	Mount Lemmon Survey	TIR	3.6 km	MPC · JPL
256856	2008 CD_{198}	—	February 11, 2008	Mount Lemmon	Mount Lemmon Survey	·	2.0 km	MPC · JPL
256857	2008 CX_{198}	—	February 13, 2008	Kitt Peak	Spacewatch	·	2.2 km	MPC · JPL
256858	2008 CY_{201}	—	February 10, 2008	Mount Lemmon	Mount Lemmon Survey	·	2.9 km	MPC · JPL
256859	2008 CD_{205}	—	February 9, 2008	Mount Lemmon	Mount Lemmon Survey	·	4.0 km	MPC · JPL
256860	2008 CU_{206}	—	February 10, 2008	Kitt Peak	Spacewatch	MAR	1.3 km	MPC · JPL
256861	2008 CM_{214}	—	February 11, 2008	Mount Lemmon	Mount Lemmon Survey	·	3.8 km	MPC · JPL
256862	2008 CR_{215}	—	February 13, 2008	Mount Lemmon	Mount Lemmon Survey	·	3.9 km	MPC · JPL
256863	2008 CT_{215}	—	February 13, 2008	Mount Lemmon	Mount Lemmon Survey	(194)	2.6 km	MPC · JPL
256864	2008 DK	—	February 24, 2008	Skylive	Tozzi, F.	·	960 m	MPC · JPL
256865	2008 DA_{1}	—	February 24, 2008	Kitt Peak	Spacewatch	·	2.4 km	MPC · JPL
256866	2008 DM_{1}	—	February 24, 2008	Kitt Peak	Spacewatch	·	920 m	MPC · JPL
256867	2008 DP_{3}	—	February 24, 2008	Kitt Peak	Spacewatch	MAS	680 m	MPC · JPL
256868	2008 DU_{7}	—	February 24, 2008	Mount Lemmon	Mount Lemmon Survey	·	1.4 km	MPC · JPL
256869	2008 DF_{11}	—	February 26, 2008	Kitt Peak	Spacewatch	MAS	810 m	MPC · JPL
256870	2008 DX_{11}	—	February 26, 2008	Kitt Peak	Spacewatch	EUN	2.4 km	MPC · JPL
256871	2008 DN_{13}	—	February 26, 2008	Mount Lemmon	Mount Lemmon Survey	·	2.1 km	MPC · JPL
256872	2008 DB_{15}	—	February 26, 2008	Mount Lemmon	Mount Lemmon Survey	·	1.5 km	MPC · JPL
256873	2008 DM_{16}	—	February 27, 2008	Kitt Peak	Spacewatch	·	1.4 km	MPC · JPL
256874	2008 DD_{17}	—	February 28, 2008	Calvin-Rehoboth	Calvin College	·	3.6 km	MPC · JPL
256875	2008 DR_{19}	—	February 27, 2008	Mount Lemmon	Mount Lemmon Survey	·	1.4 km	MPC · JPL
256876	2008 DE_{22}	—	February 28, 2008	Mount Lemmon	Mount Lemmon Survey	·	2.1 km	MPC · JPL
256877	2008 DW_{24}	—	February 28, 2008	Mount Lemmon	Mount Lemmon Survey	·	2.9 km	MPC · JPL
256878	2008 DC_{31}	—	February 27, 2008	Kitt Peak	Spacewatch	·	1.4 km	MPC · JPL
256879	2008 DU_{32}	—	February 27, 2008	Kitt Peak	Spacewatch	·	2.0 km	MPC · JPL
256880	2008 DE_{33}	—	February 27, 2008	Kitt Peak	Spacewatch	PAD	3.0 km	MPC · JPL
256881	2008 DK_{34}	—	February 27, 2008	Kitt Peak	Spacewatch	KOR	1.7 km	MPC · JPL
256882	2008 DR_{34}	—	February 27, 2008	Kitt Peak	Spacewatch	·	2.6 km	MPC · JPL
256883	2008 DF_{37}	—	February 27, 2008	Mount Lemmon	Mount Lemmon Survey	·	2.4 km	MPC · JPL
256884	2008 DN_{37}	—	February 27, 2008	Kitt Peak	Spacewatch	·	3.2 km	MPC · JPL
256885	2008 DO_{37}	—	February 27, 2008	Mount Lemmon	Mount Lemmon Survey	MRX	1.7 km	MPC · JPL
256886	2008 DQ_{37}	—	February 27, 2008	Mount Lemmon	Mount Lemmon Survey	·	1.6 km	MPC · JPL
256887	2008 DN_{38}	—	February 27, 2008	Kitt Peak	Spacewatch	·	2.3 km	MPC · JPL
256888	2008 DS_{38}	—	February 27, 2008	Kitt Peak	Spacewatch	·	3.8 km	MPC · JPL
256889	2008 DV_{38}	—	February 27, 2008	Mount Lemmon	Mount Lemmon Survey	·	2.3 km	MPC · JPL
256890	2008 DT_{40}	—	February 27, 2008	Kitt Peak	Spacewatch	·	2.7 km	MPC · JPL
256891	2008 DU_{40}	—	February 27, 2008	Kitt Peak	Spacewatch	·	1.3 km	MPC · JPL
256892 Wutayou	2008 DW_{40}	Wutayou	February 27, 2008	Lulin	Lin, C.-S., Q. Ye	NYS	1.5 km	MPC · JPL
256893	2008 DM_{43}	—	February 28, 2008	Mount Lemmon	Mount Lemmon Survey	NYS	1.2 km	MPC · JPL
256894	2008 DR_{43}	—	February 28, 2008	Catalina	CSS	LIX	5.1 km	MPC · JPL
256895	2008 DC_{44}	—	February 28, 2008	Mount Lemmon	Mount Lemmon Survey	·	2.5 km	MPC · JPL
256896	2008 DC_{47}	—	February 28, 2008	Kitt Peak	Spacewatch	·	3.0 km	MPC · JPL
256897	2008 DN_{47}	—	February 28, 2008	Kitt Peak	Spacewatch	·	2.5 km	MPC · JPL
256898	2008 DZ_{51}	—	February 29, 2008	Kitt Peak	Spacewatch	·	3.1 km	MPC · JPL
256899	2008 DB_{52}	—	February 29, 2008	Kitt Peak	Spacewatch	·	3.6 km	MPC · JPL
256900	2008 DP_{53}	—	February 29, 2008	Mount Lemmon	Mount Lemmon Survey	·	2.4 km	MPC · JPL

== 256901–257000 ==
back to top

Designation			Discovery			Properties		Ref
Permanent	Provisional	Named after	Date	Site	Discoverer(s)	Category	Diam.	Ref
256901	2008 DW_{53}	—	February 29, 2008	Kitt Peak	Spacewatch	·	2.8 km	MPC · JPL
256902	2008 DO_{55}	—	February 26, 2008	Mount Lemmon	Mount Lemmon Survey	AGN	1.9 km	MPC · JPL
256903	2008 DF_{56}	—	February 29, 2008	Kitt Peak	Spacewatch	·	2.2 km	MPC · JPL
256904	2008 DY_{63}	—	February 28, 2008	Mount Lemmon	Mount Lemmon Survey	MAS	900 m	MPC · JPL
256905	2008 DW_{66}	—	February 29, 2008	Kitt Peak	Spacewatch	·	2.2 km	MPC · JPL
256906	2008 DR_{68}	—	February 29, 2008	Kitt Peak	Spacewatch	·	3.5 km	MPC · JPL
256907	2008 DM_{71}	—	February 24, 2008	Mount Lemmon	Mount Lemmon Survey	·	3.0 km	MPC · JPL
256908	2008 DW_{72}	—	February 26, 2008	Mount Lemmon	Mount Lemmon Survey	·	1.3 km	MPC · JPL
256909	2008 DT_{81}	—	February 27, 2008	Kitt Peak	Spacewatch	·	2.5 km	MPC · JPL
256910	2008 DW_{82}	—	February 28, 2008	Mount Lemmon	Mount Lemmon Survey	KOR	1.9 km	MPC · JPL
256911	2008 DL_{83}	—	February 29, 2008	Kitt Peak	Spacewatch	·	2.2 km	MPC · JPL
256912	2008 DP_{83}	—	February 29, 2008	Kitt Peak	Spacewatch	KOR	1.6 km	MPC · JPL
256913	2008 DV_{84}	—	February 18, 2008	Mount Lemmon	Mount Lemmon Survey	·	2.5 km	MPC · JPL
256914	2008 DO_{86}	—	February 29, 2008	Kitt Peak	Spacewatch	·	2.7 km	MPC · JPL
256915	2008 EA_{2}	—	March 1, 2008	Kitt Peak	Spacewatch	·	1.9 km	MPC · JPL
256916	2008 EC_{2}	—	March 1, 2008	Kitt Peak	Spacewatch	(5)	1.0 km	MPC · JPL
256917	2008 EJ_{5}	—	March 1, 2008	Anderson Mesa	LONEOS	·	2.0 km	MPC · JPL
256918	2008 EA_{6}	—	March 1, 2008	Kitt Peak	Spacewatch	·	2.4 km	MPC · JPL
256919	2008 EX_{6}	—	March 3, 2008	Dauban	Kugel, F.	·	1.4 km	MPC · JPL
256920	2008 EH_{7}	—	March 5, 2008	Mount Lemmon	Mount Lemmon Survey	·	1.1 km	MPC · JPL
256921	2008 EV_{7}	—	March 1, 2008	La Sagra	OAM	·	2.7 km	MPC · JPL
256922	2008 ET_{11}	—	March 1, 2008	Kitt Peak	Spacewatch	NEM	2.6 km	MPC · JPL
256923	2008 EC_{13}	—	March 1, 2008	Kitt Peak	Spacewatch	HOF	4.1 km	MPC · JPL
256924	2008 EF_{13}	—	March 1, 2008	Kitt Peak	Spacewatch	AGN	1.5 km	MPC · JPL
256925	2008 EH_{15}	—	March 1, 2008	Kitt Peak	Spacewatch	·	2.3 km	MPC · JPL
256926	2008 EJ_{16}	—	March 1, 2008	Kitt Peak	Spacewatch	·	1.5 km	MPC · JPL
256927	2008 EU_{21}	—	March 2, 2008	Kitt Peak	Spacewatch	·	3.6 km	MPC · JPL
256928	2008 EW_{21}	—	March 2, 2008	Kitt Peak	Spacewatch	AGN	1.6 km	MPC · JPL
256929	2008 EO_{23}	—	March 3, 2008	Catalina	CSS	·	1.7 km	MPC · JPL
256930	2008 EY_{26}	—	March 4, 2008	Kitt Peak	Spacewatch	HOF	2.7 km	MPC · JPL
256931	2008 ER_{28}	—	March 4, 2008	Mount Lemmon	Mount Lemmon Survey	HYG	4.4 km	MPC · JPL
256932	2008 EC_{29}	—	March 4, 2008	Mount Lemmon	Mount Lemmon Survey	EUN	1.4 km	MPC · JPL
256933	2008 EE_{29}	—	March 4, 2008	Mount Lemmon	Mount Lemmon Survey	·	5.1 km	MPC · JPL
256934	2008 EK_{32}	—	March 8, 2008	Grove Creek	Tozzi, F.	·	2.9 km	MPC · JPL
256935	2008 EG_{34}	—	March 2, 2008	Kitt Peak	Spacewatch	·	2.9 km	MPC · JPL
256936	2008 EZ_{37}	—	March 4, 2008	Kitt Peak	Spacewatch	·	4.9 km	MPC · JPL
256937	2008 EG_{38}	—	March 4, 2008	Kitt Peak	Spacewatch	·	870 m	MPC · JPL
256938	2008 EH_{39}	—	March 4, 2008	Kitt Peak	Spacewatch	·	1.4 km	MPC · JPL
256939	2008 EA_{40}	—	March 4, 2008	Kitt Peak	Spacewatch	·	2.6 km	MPC · JPL
256940	2008 EW_{40}	—	March 4, 2008	Kitt Peak	Spacewatch	·	1.5 km	MPC · JPL
256941	2008 EJ_{42}	—	March 4, 2008	Kitt Peak	Spacewatch	·	2.2 km	MPC · JPL
256942	2008 EM_{42}	—	March 4, 2008	Kitt Peak	Spacewatch	·	1.3 km	MPC · JPL
256943	2008 EG_{46}	—	March 5, 2008	Kitt Peak	Spacewatch	HNS	1.5 km	MPC · JPL
256944	2008 EZ_{47}	—	March 5, 2008	Kitt Peak	Spacewatch	DOR	2.4 km	MPC · JPL
256945	2008 ED_{48}	—	March 5, 2008	Kitt Peak	Spacewatch	PHO	2.1 km	MPC · JPL
256946	2008 EJ_{48}	—	March 5, 2008	Kitt Peak	Spacewatch	·	1.9 km	MPC · JPL
256947	2008 EQ_{49}	—	March 6, 2008	Kitt Peak	Spacewatch	·	2.5 km	MPC · JPL
256948	2008 ED_{51}	—	March 6, 2008	Kitt Peak	Spacewatch	·	2.0 km	MPC · JPL
256949	2008 ED_{59}	—	March 8, 2008	Mount Lemmon	Mount Lemmon Survey	·	1.2 km	MPC · JPL
256950	2008 EZ_{59}	—	March 8, 2008	Catalina	CSS	·	3.1 km	MPC · JPL
256951	2008 EF_{68}	—	March 9, 2008	Desert Moon	Stevens, B. L.	·	2.0 km	MPC · JPL
256952	2008 EM_{69}	—	March 5, 2008	Mount Lemmon	Mount Lemmon Survey	WIT	1.3 km	MPC · JPL
256953	2008 EH_{72}	—	March 6, 2008	Mount Lemmon	Mount Lemmon Survey	·	3.1 km	MPC · JPL
256954	2008 EV_{72}	—	March 6, 2008	Mount Lemmon	Mount Lemmon Survey	·	2.6 km	MPC · JPL
256955	2008 ER_{75}	—	March 7, 2008	Kitt Peak	Spacewatch	·	1.4 km	MPC · JPL
256956	2008 ES_{75}	—	March 7, 2008	Kitt Peak	Spacewatch	·	3.1 km	MPC · JPL
256957	2008 EA_{76}	—	March 7, 2008	Kitt Peak	Spacewatch	·	1.8 km	MPC · JPL
256958	2008 EM_{76}	—	March 7, 2008	Kitt Peak	Spacewatch	NYS	1.2 km	MPC · JPL
256959	2008 ER_{77}	—	March 7, 2008	Kitt Peak	Spacewatch	AGN	1.4 km	MPC · JPL
256960	2008 EL_{82}	—	March 8, 2008	Socorro	LINEAR	·	5.3 km	MPC · JPL
256961	2008 EA_{83}	—	March 8, 2008	Socorro	LINEAR	·	1.7 km	MPC · JPL
256962	2008 EW_{83}	—	March 8, 2008	Catalina	CSS	EOS	3.8 km	MPC · JPL
256963	2008 ES_{84}	—	March 13, 2008	Grove Creek	Tozzi, F.	·	2.7 km	MPC · JPL
256964	2008 EV_{86}	—	March 7, 2008	Kitt Peak	Spacewatch	·	2.2 km	MPC · JPL
256965	2008 EL_{87}	—	March 8, 2008	Catalina	CSS	·	2.3 km	MPC · JPL
256966	2008 EP_{89}	—	March 9, 2008	Socorro	LINEAR	·	4.1 km	MPC · JPL
256967	2008 EV_{89}	—	March 10, 2008	Mount Nyukasa	Japan Aerospace Exploration Agency	·	2.5 km	MPC · JPL
256968	2008 EL_{90}	—	March 6, 2008	Kitt Peak	Spacewatch	·	1.7 km	MPC · JPL
256969	2008 EA_{95}	—	March 5, 2008	Mount Lemmon	Mount Lemmon Survey	HOF	3.3 km	MPC · JPL
256970	2008 ET_{97}	—	March 11, 2008	Mount Lemmon	Mount Lemmon Survey	HNS	1.7 km	MPC · JPL
256971	2008 ET_{98}	—	March 3, 2008	Catalina	CSS	·	660 m	MPC · JPL
256972	2008 EJ_{101}	—	March 5, 2008	Mount Lemmon	Mount Lemmon Survey	·	3.1 km	MPC · JPL
256973	2008 EQ_{104}	—	March 6, 2008	Kitt Peak	Spacewatch	·	3.7 km	MPC · JPL
256974	2008 ET_{107}	—	March 7, 2008	Mount Lemmon	Mount Lemmon Survey	·	2.1 km	MPC · JPL
256975	2008 EE_{113}	—	March 8, 2008	Kitt Peak	Spacewatch	·	2.6 km	MPC · JPL
256976	2008 EM_{114}	—	March 8, 2008	Kitt Peak	Spacewatch	EUN	2.1 km	MPC · JPL
256977	2008 ES_{119}	—	March 9, 2008	Kitt Peak	Spacewatch	(5)	1.9 km	MPC · JPL
256978	2008 EC_{120}	—	March 9, 2008	Kitt Peak	Spacewatch	EUN	1.6 km	MPC · JPL
256979	2008 EN_{121}	—	March 9, 2008	Kitt Peak	Spacewatch	·	3.0 km	MPC · JPL
256980	2008 EV_{121}	—	March 9, 2008	Kitt Peak	Spacewatch	·	2.0 km	MPC · JPL
256981	2008 EA_{122}	—	March 9, 2008	Kitt Peak	Spacewatch	·	3.1 km	MPC · JPL
256982	2008 EW_{122}	—	March 9, 2008	Kitt Peak	Spacewatch	·	2.1 km	MPC · JPL
256983	2008 EJ_{127}	—	March 10, 2008	Kitt Peak	Spacewatch	·	2.3 km	MPC · JPL
256984	2008 EL_{127}	—	March 10, 2008	Catalina	CSS	·	2.7 km	MPC · JPL
256985	2008 EW_{128}	—	March 11, 2008	Kitt Peak	Spacewatch	·	2.0 km	MPC · JPL
256986	2008 EL_{129}	—	March 11, 2008	Kitt Peak	Spacewatch	HOF	4.2 km	MPC · JPL
256987	2008 EL_{132}	—	March 11, 2008	Catalina	CSS	MAR	1.3 km	MPC · JPL
256988	2008 EM_{133}	—	March 11, 2008	Mount Lemmon	Mount Lemmon Survey	EOS	2.6 km	MPC · JPL
256989	2008 EM_{137}	—	March 11, 2008	Kitt Peak	Spacewatch	BRA	1.9 km	MPC · JPL
256990	2008 ET_{137}	—	March 11, 2008	Kitt Peak	Spacewatch	·	3.0 km	MPC · JPL
256991	2008 ES_{139}	—	March 11, 2008	Catalina	CSS	NYS	1.4 km	MPC · JPL
256992	2008 EC_{140}	—	March 12, 2008	Kitt Peak	Spacewatch	·	810 m	MPC · JPL
256993	2008 EM_{142}	—	March 12, 2008	Mount Lemmon	Mount Lemmon Survey	·	2.3 km	MPC · JPL
256994	2008 EB_{143}	—	March 13, 2008	Catalina	CSS	EUN	1.7 km	MPC · JPL
256995	2008 EJ_{147}	—	March 1, 2008	Kitt Peak	Spacewatch	·	1.3 km	MPC · JPL
256996	2008 ED_{148}	—	March 1, 2008	Kitt Peak	Spacewatch	·	3.3 km	MPC · JPL
256997	2008 EF_{148}	—	March 1, 2008	Kitt Peak	Spacewatch	·	1.7 km	MPC · JPL
256998	2008 EJ_{149}	—	March 4, 2008	Kitt Peak	Spacewatch	·	3.7 km	MPC · JPL
256999	2008 EC_{150}	—	March 7, 2008	Catalina	CSS	·	2.7 km	MPC · JPL
257000	2008 EF_{150}	—	March 9, 2008	Kitt Peak	Spacewatch	(12739)	1.9 km	MPC · JPL

back to top

== See also ==
- Meanings of minor-planet names: 256001–257000
