= List of Jupiter trojans (Greek camp) (200001–300000) =

This is a partial list of Jupiter's L_{4} trojans (60° ahead of Jupiter) with numbers 200001–300000. If available, an object's mean diameter is taken from the NEOWISE data release, which the Small-Body Database has also adopted. Mean diameters are rounded to two significant figures if smaller than 100 kilometers. Estimates are in italics and calculated from a magnitude-to-diameter conversion, using an assumed albedo of 0.057.

== 200001–300000 ==
This list contains 777 objects sorted in numerical order.

Designation	Discovery			Orbital description					Diam.	Remarks	Refs
Designation	Date	Observer	Site	a (AU)	e	i (°)	q (AU)	Q (AU)	Diam.	Remarks	Refs
(200022) 2007 OW_{5}	22 July 2007	LUSS	Lulin	5.279	0.110	7.9	4.698	5.859	17 km	–	catalog · MPC · JPL
(200023) 2007 OU_{6}	25 July 2007	OAM	La Sagra	5.258	0.084	16.0	4.818	5.697	16 km	–	catalog · MPC · JPL
(200024) 2007 OO_{7}	25 July 2007	Chante-Perdrix	Dauban	5.297	0.087	7.0	4.836	5.757	14 km	–	catalog · MPC · JPL
(200027) 2007 PM_{27}	14 August 2007	R. Ferrando	Pla D'Arguines	5.222	0.037	10.2	5.028	5.416	12 km	–	catalog · MPC · JPL
(200028) 2007 PW_{28}	12 August 2007	LINEAR	Socorro	5.214	0.092	9.8	4.733	5.696	17 km	–	catalog · MPC · JPL
(200029) 2007 PH_{37}	13 August 2007	LINEAR	Socorro	5.233	0.075	20.0	4.843	5.623	21 km	–	catalog · MPC · JPL
(200032) 2007 PU_{43}	12 August 2007	LINEAR	Socorro	5.278	0.068	6.1	4.917	5.640	18 km	–	catalog · MPC · JPL
(200035) 2007 RZ_{71}	10 September 2007	Spacewatch	Kitt Peak	5.247	0.063	12.6	4.914	5.580	13 km	–	catalog · MPC · JPL
(200036) 2007 RH_{77}	10 September 2007	MLS	Mount Lemmon	5.272	0.042	3.3	5.051	5.494	12 km	–	catalog · MPC · JPL
(200037) 2007 RW_{105}	11 September 2007	CSS	Catalina	5.244	0.071	4.4	4.874	5.614	12 km	–	catalog · MPC · JPL
(200042) 2007 TE_{32}	6 October 2007	Spacewatch	Kitt Peak	5.142	0.044	3.6	4.916	5.369	11 km	–	catalog · MPC · JPL
(200046) 2007 TP_{371}	13 October 2007	CSS	Catalina	5.280	0.022	4.9	5.167	5.394	17 km	–	catalog · MPC · JPL
(200051) 2008 OE_{10}	28 July 2008	Chante-Perdrix	Dauban	5.198	0.119	5.6	4.581	5.815	15 km	–	catalog · MPC · JPL
(200057) 2008 PT_{16}	11 August 2008	Črni Vrh	Crni Vrh	5.166	0.109	24.7	4.604	5.728	15 km	–	catalog · MPC · JPL
200069 Alastor	24 September 1960	C. J. van Houten; I. van Houten-Groeneveld; T. Gehrels	Palomar	5.333	0.068	6.1	4.970	5.697	12 km	–	catalog · MPC · JPL
(200544) 2001 FJ_{86}	27 March 2001	Spacewatch	Kitt Peak	5.327	0.069	3.0	4.960	5.693	9.4 km	–	catalog · MPC · JPL
(201006) 2002 CH_{185}	10 February 2002	LINEAR	Socorro	5.068	0.007	4.1	5.035	5.102	13 km	–	catalog · MPC · JPL
(201039) 2002 ES_{5}	9 March 2002	NEAT	Palomar	5.212	0.086	8.7	4.766	5.659	13 km	–	catalog · MPC · JPL
(201040) 2002 EX_{7}	10 March 2002	NEAT	Haleakala	5.239	0.067	7.9	4.888	5.589	17 km	–	catalog · MPC · JPL
(202752) 2007 PX_{30}	5 August 2007	LINEAR	Socorro	5.234	0.146	18.7	4.471	5.997	21 km	–	catalog · MPC · JPL
(202756) 2007 QL_{11}	23 August 2007	Spacewatch	Kitt Peak	5.245	0.028	13.8	5.098	5.392	12 km	–	catalog · MPC · JPL
(202758) 2007 RJ_{19}	4 September 2007	D. Healy	Junk Bond	5.375	0.049	4.0	5.111	5.639	12 km	–	catalog · MPC · JPL
(202783) 2007 YK_{2}	19 December 2007	MLS	Mount Lemmon	5.222	0.034	21.2	5.043	5.401	22 km	–	catalog · MPC · JPL
(202791) 2008 QC_{4}	24 August 2008	OAM	La Sagra	5.180	0.081	8.2	4.760	5.599	13 km	–	catalog · MPC · JPL
(202797) 2008 QR_{30}	30 August 2008	LINEAR	Socorro	5.274	0.125	8.5	4.617	5.931	13 km	–	catalog · MPC · JPL
(202824) 2008 SX_{107}	22 September 2008	Spacewatch	Kitt Peak	5.197	0.083	8.5	4.764	5.630	12 km	–	catalog · MPC · JPL
(202850) 2008 TM_{78}	2 October 2008	MLS	Mount Lemmon	5.307	0.049	1.4	5.047	5.567	11 km	–	catalog · MPC · JPL
(202854) 2008 TJ_{99}	6 October 2008	Spacewatch	Kitt Peak	5.236	0.069	1.9	4.873	5.598	14 km	–	catalog · MPC · JPL
(202855) 2008 TX_{109}	6 October 2008	MLS	Mount Lemmon	5.318	0.043	8.5	5.089	5.548	19 km	–	catalog · MPC · JPL
(203210) 2001 DR_{100}	16 February 2001	LINEAR	Socorro	5.284	0.034	10.7	5.104	5.465	15 km	–	catalog · MPC · JPL
(203891) 2003 FR_{43}	23 March 2003	Spacewatch	Kitt Peak	5.219	0.046	10.9	4.977	5.461	14 km	–	catalog · MPC · JPL
(204619) 2005 LB_{37}	13 June 2005	W. Bickel	Bergisch Gladbach	5.197	0.104	25.6	4.656	5.737	15 km	–	catalog · MPC · JPL
(204847) 2007 RN_{63}	10 September 2007	MLS	Mount Lemmon	5.229	0.075	2.0	4.839	5.619	10 km	–	catalog · MPC · JPL
(204911) 2008 QE_{5}	22 August 2008	Spacewatch	Kitt Peak	5.179	0.032	14.8	5.014	5.343	14 km	–	catalog · MPC · JPL
(204927) 2008 TM_{52}	2 October 2008	Spacewatch	Kitt Peak	5.255	0.039	4.3	5.050	5.461	11 km	–	catalog · MPC · JPL
(205380) 2001 BT_{31}	20 January 2001	LINEAR	Socorro	5.188	0.109	28.0	4.624	5.752	14 km	–	catalog · MPC · JPL
(207749) 2007 RC_{286}	2 September 2007	MLS	Mount Lemmon	5.271	0.061	24.7	4.950	5.591	21 km	–	catalog · MPC · JPL
(207892) 2008 SG_{182}	24 September 2008	Spacewatch	Kitt Peak	5.347	0.030	5.6	5.186	5.507	15 km	–	catalog · MPC · JPL
(210237) 2007 RQ_{154}	10 September 2007	CSS	Catalina	5.297	0.056	6.9	4.999	5.594	17 km	–	catalog · MPC · JPL
(212694) 2007 PT_{11}	12 August 2007	PMO NEO Survey Program	XuYi	5.249	0.086	12.7	4.797	5.701	14 km	–	catalog · MPC · JPL
(213119) 2000 AT_{220}	8 January 2000	Spacewatch	Kitt Peak	5.343	0.035	6.8	5.155	5.531	14 km	–	catalog · MPC · JPL
(213491) 2002 GO_{15}	15 April 2002	LINEAR	Socorro	5.341	0.078	4.4	4.922	5.760	16 km	–	catalog · MPC · JPL
(214093) 2004 JQ_{43}	10 May 2004	Spacewatch	Kitt Peak	5.161	0.050	16.8	4.906	5.417	16 km	–	catalog · MPC · JPL
(214376) 2005 LF_{20}	4 June 2005	Spacewatch	Kitt Peak	5.215	0.060	8.2	4.903	5.527	13 km	–	catalog · MPC · JPL
(215107) 1996 RX_{15}	13 September 1996	Spacewatch	Kitt Peak	5.196	0.038	4.2	4.998	5.394	13 km	–	catalog · MPC · JPL
(215243) 2001 DG_{97}	17 February 2001	LINEAR	Socorro	5.235	0.132	10.0	4.545	5.925	15 km	–	catalog · MPC · JPL
(215407) 2002 EK_{115}	10 March 2002	Spacewatch	Kitt Peak	5.283	0.058	3.7	4.978	5.588	13 km	–	catalog · MPC · JPL
(216307) 2007 TM_{92}	5 October 2007	Spacewatch	Kitt Peak	5.262	0.092	4.4	4.776	5.748	10 km	–	catalog · MPC · JPL
(216419) 2008 SJ_{172}	21 September 2008	CSS	Catalina	5.281	0.130	9.3	4.597	5.966	13 km	–	catalog · MPC · JPL
(216421) 2008 TD_{3}	1 October 2008	F. Tozzi	Sierra Stars	5.148	0.136	7.7	4.449	5.847	10 km	–	catalog · MPC · JPL
(216423) 2008 TZ_{135}	8 October 2008	Spacewatch	Kitt Peak	5.188	0.046	7.9	4.950	5.426	12 km	–	catalog · MPC · JPL
216462 Polyphontes	30 September 1973	C. J. van Houten; I. van Houten-Groeneveld; T. Gehrels	Palomar	5.220	0.108	10.0	4.654	5.786	10 km	–	catalog · MPC · JPL
(216883) 2008 QG_{41}	21 August 2008	Spacewatch	Kitt Peak	5.199	0.088	7.8	4.742	5.656	13 km	–	catalog · MPC · JPL
(217612) 2008 TD_{126}	8 October 2008	MLS	Mount Lemmon	5.281	0.023	14.2	5.161	5.401	19 km	–	catalog · MPC · JPL
(217670) 1998 UQ_{6}	22 October 1998	D. D. Balam	Dominion	5.081	0.032	3.0	4.920	5.242	13 km	–	catalog · MPC · JPL
(218070) 2002 FL_{37}	31 March 2002	NEAT	Palomar	5.115	0.055	22.8	4.834	5.396	16 km	–	catalog · MPC · JPL
(219057) 1996 RA_{30}	12 September 1996	Uppsala-DLR Trojan Survey	La Silla	5.201	0.079	12.3	4.789	5.612	17 km	–	catalog · MPC · JPL
(219070) 1997 TL_{20}	3 October 1997	Spacewatch	Kitt Peak	5.240	0.042	1.0	5.019	5.462	12 km	–	catalog · MPC · JPL
(219125) 1998 US_{11}	17 October 1998	Spacewatch	Kitt Peak	5.072	0.092	6.9	4.608	5.536	14 km	–	catalog · MPC · JPL
(219139) 1998 WM_{24}	18 November 1998	M. W. Buie	Kitt Peak	5.162	0.148	3.6	4.400	5.924	11 km	–	catalog · MPC · JPL
(219140) 1998 WO_{39}	22 November 1998	Spacewatch	Kitt Peak	5.198	0.091	1.9	4.725	5.670	12 km	–	catalog · MPC · JPL
(219141) 1998 XZ_{6}	8 December 1998	Spacewatch	Kitt Peak	5.186	0.031	8.8	5.023	5.348	16 km	–	catalog · MPC · JPL
(219466) 2001 AQ_{10}	2 January 2001	LINEAR	Socorro	5.139	0.114	13.0	4.556	5.723	16 km	–	catalog · MPC · JPL
(219834) 2002 CK_{80}	7 February 2002	LINEAR	Socorro	5.195	0.039	10.4	4.993	5.397	15 km	–	catalog · MPC · JPL
(219835) 2002 CH_{82}	7 February 2002	LINEAR	Socorro	5.124	0.097	6.5	4.625	5.624	12 km	–	catalog · MPC · JPL
(219837) 2002 CH_{109}	7 February 2002	LINEAR	Socorro	5.145	0.065	7.1	4.811	5.479	15 km	–	catalog · MPC · JPL
(219844) 2002 CQ_{148}	10 February 2002	LINEAR	Socorro	5.038	0.080	2.4	4.637	5.440	11 km	–	catalog · MPC · JPL
(219857) 2002 CB_{230}	11 February 2002	Spacewatch	Kitt Peak	5.137	0.078	3.1	4.738	5.536	8.7 km	–	catalog · MPC · JPL
(219866) 2002 CS_{266}	7 February 2002	NEAT	Palomar	5.110	0.022	1.6	4.997	5.223	9.9 km	–	catalog · MPC · JPL
(219881) 2002 ES_{32}	11 March 2002	NEAT	Palomar	5.163	0.027	9.9	5.025	5.300	16 km	–	catalog · MPC · JPL
(219890) 2002 EO_{80}	12 March 2002	NEAT	Palomar	5.233	0.131	8.5	4.549	5.918	14 km	–	catalog · MPC · JPL
(219892) 2002 EF_{95}	14 March 2002	LINEAR	Socorro	5.202	0.046	6.1	4.961	5.444	12 km	–	catalog · MPC · JPL
(219896) 2002 EW_{111}	9 March 2002	Spacewatch	Kitt Peak	5.179	0.036	2.0	4.995	5.363	12 km	–	catalog · MPC · JPL
(219897) 2002 ET_{114}	10 March 2002	Spacewatch	Kitt Peak	5.254	0.114	3.7	4.657	5.851	12 km	–	catalog · MPC · JPL
(219902) 2002 EG_{134}	13 March 2002	NEAT	Palomar	5.214	0.083	4.6	4.779	5.649	14 km	–	catalog · MPC · JPL
(219905) 2002 ET_{140}	12 March 2002	NEAT	Palomar	5.155	0.034	5.9	4.981	5.329	11 km	–	catalog · MPC · JPL
(219907) 2002 EL_{160}	15 March 2002	NEAT	Palomar	5.242	0.083	6.8	4.808	5.677	11 km	–	catalog · MPC · JPL
(219908) 2002 ES_{161}	6 March 2002	NEAT	Palomar	5.075	0.073	8.6	4.707	5.444	12 km	–	catalog · MPC · JPL
(219954) 2002 GL_{184}	5 April 2002	NEAT	Palomar	5.185	0.117	15.5	4.577	5.794	13 km	–	catalog · MPC · JPL
(219958) 2002 JG_{16}	9 May 2002	Tenagra II	Nogales	5.094	0.051	16.3	4.832	5.355	17 km	–	catalog · MPC · JPL
(220312) 2003 EX_{42}	10 March 2003	Spacewatch	Kitt Peak	5.181	0.115	13.6	4.586	5.776	12 km	–	catalog · MPC · JPL
(220318) 2003 EG_{63}	10 March 2003	LONEOS	Anderson Mesa	5.130	0.025	11.1	5.003	5.257	15 km	–	catalog · MPC · JPL
(220324) 2003 FA_{32}	23 March 2003	Spacewatch	Kitt Peak	5.129	0.069	8.0	4.776	5.482	15 km	–	catalog · MPC · JPL
(220333) 2003 FM_{133}	27 March 2003	Spacewatch	Kitt Peak	5.202	0.066	2.9	4.859	5.545	8.9 km	–	catalog · MPC · JPL
(220335) 2003 GD_{8}	3 April 2003	LONEOS	Anderson Mesa	5.160	0.067	15.0	4.815	5.505	15 km	–	catalog · MPC · JPL
(220336) 2003 GM_{8}	3 April 2003	LONEOS	Anderson Mesa	5.210	0.111	1.1	4.632	5.789	9.9 km	–	catalog · MPC · JPL
(220342) 2003 GP_{27}	7 April 2003	Spacewatch	Kitt Peak	5.128	0.064	3.4	4.800	5.456	10 km	–	catalog · MPC · JPL
(220351) 2003 HK_{22}	24 April 2003	Spacewatch	Kitt Peak	5.250	0.019	11.8	5.149	5.351	16 km	–	catalog · MPC · JPL
(220355) 2003 JG_{11}	3 May 2003	Spacewatch	Kitt Peak	5.283	0.160	1.4	4.438	6.127	11 km	–	catalog · MPC · JPL
(220356) 2003 JJ_{15}	6 May 2003	Spacewatch	Kitt Peak	5.253	0.037	11.4	5.058	5.449	15 km	–	catalog · MPC · JPL
(220530) 2004 FT_{18}	26 March 2004	Deep Lens Survey	Kitt Peak	5.200	0.066	17.2	4.856	5.545	10 km	–	catalog · MPC · JPL
(220555) 2004 GG_{82}	13 April 2004	NEAT	Palomar	5.179	0.026	8.7	5.046	5.312	12 km	–	catalog · MPC · JPL
(220570) 2004 HB_{52}	24 April 2004	Spacewatch	Kitt Peak	5.121	0.060	6.9	4.814	5.428	13 km	–	catalog · MPC · JPL
(220574) 2004 HR_{57}	21 April 2004	Spacewatch	Kitt Peak	5.262	0.107	2.9	4.696	5.827	11 km	–	catalog · MPC · JPL
(220951) 2005 LT_{17}	6 June 2005	Spacewatch	Kitt Peak	5.096	0.052	2.4	4.831	5.361	12 km	–	catalog · MPC · JPL
(221542) 2006 UB_{63}	22 October 2006	MLS	Mount Lemmon	5.181	0.068	26.3	4.829	5.534	18 km	–	catalog · MPC · JPL
(221780) 2007 MD_{11}	21 June 2007	MLS	Mount Lemmon	5.205	0.027	1.6	5.066	5.345	12 km	–	catalog · MPC · JPL
(221785) 2007 VJ_{6}	4 November 2007	MLS	Mount Lemmon	5.223	0.095	8.3	4.729	5.717	9.4 km	–	catalog · MPC · JPL
(221786) 2007 VA_{8}	4 November 2007	MLS	Mount Lemmon	5.158	0.025	8.0	5.029	5.287	12 km	–	catalog · MPC · JPL
221908 Agastrophus	21 August 2008	P. Kocher	Marly	5.106	0.066	7.3	4.769	5.444	15 km	–	catalog · MPC · JPL
(221909) 2008 QY_{14}	24 August 2008	R. Ferrando	Pla D'Arguines	5.240	0.066	6.3	4.897	5.584	12 km	–	catalog · MPC · JPL
(221910) 2008 QT_{23}	31 August 2008	S. F. Hönig; N. Teamo	Hibiscus	5.178	0.112	19.7	4.599	5.756	17 km	–	catalog · MPC · JPL
(221911) 2008 QX_{41}	27 August 2008	OAM	La Sagra	5.279	0.033	5.6	5.107	5.451	14 km	–	catalog · MPC · JPL
(221912) 2008 RU_{25}	5 September 2008	J. Dellinger; C. Sexton	Needville	5.251	0.094	5.3	4.756	5.745	12 km	–	catalog · MPC · JPL
(221913) 2008 RS_{28}	2 September 2008	Spacewatch	Kitt Peak	5.138	0.055	2.3	4.856	5.420	10 km	–	catalog · MPC · JPL
(221914) 2008 RW_{33}	2 September 2008	Spacewatch	Kitt Peak	5.223	0.025	3.1	5.090	5.356	9.9 km	–	catalog · MPC · JPL
(221915) 2008 SH_{8}	22 September 2008	LINEAR	Socorro	5.145	0.061	4.1	4.831	5.458	14 km	–	catalog · MPC · JPL
(221916) 2008 SQ_{81}	23 September 2008	P. Kocher	Marly	5.107	0.043	5.4	4.886	5.328	10 km	–	catalog · MPC · JPL
221917 Opites	26 September 2008	S. Karge; E. Schwab	Taunus	5.257	0.078	23.9	4.847	5.668	15 km	–	catalog · MPC · JPL
(221995) 1997 TT_{21}	4 October 1997	Spacewatch	Kitt Peak	5.180	0.064	5.5	4.847	5.514	10 km	–	catalog · MPC · JPL
(222049) 1998 UT_{50}	18 October 1998	Spacewatch	Kitt Peak	5.172	0.104	11.0	4.635	5.709	13 km	–	catalog · MPC · JPL
(222056) 1998 WK_{24}	18 November 1998	M. W. Buie	Kitt Peak	5.084	0.050	3.3	4.830	5.338	9.2 km	–	catalog · MPC · JPL
(222063) 1998 XK_{6}	8 December 1998	Spacewatch	Kitt Peak	5.221	0.080	13.2	4.802	5.640	12 km	–	catalog · MPC · JPL
(222134) 1999 VK_{112}	9 November 1999	LINEAR	Socorro	5.135	0.036	7.0	4.952	5.318	15 km	–	catalog · MPC · JPL
(222379) 2001 BU_{56}	19 January 2001	Spacewatch	Kitt Peak	5.186	0.089	1.9	4.723	5.649	12 km	–	catalog · MPC · JPL
(222384) 2001 DO_{48}	16 February 2001	LINEAR	Socorro	5.185	0.088	14.2	4.730	5.641	18 km	–	catalog · MPC · JPL
(222773) 2002 CB_{97}	7 February 2002	LINEAR	Socorro	5.233	0.026	16.5	5.095	5.372	14 km	–	catalog · MPC · JPL
(222785) 2002 CK_{183}	10 February 2002	LINEAR	Socorro	5.071	0.032	6.7	4.908	5.234	12 km	–	catalog · MPC · JPL
(222790) 2002 CB_{205}	10 February 2002	LINEAR	Socorro	5.189	0.031	7.8	5.031	5.348	12 km	–	catalog · MPC · JPL
(222791) 2002 CG_{205}	10 February 2002	LINEAR	Socorro	5.136	0.086	2.9	4.695	5.577	10 km	–	catalog · MPC · JPL
(222821) 2002 CB_{316}	13 February 2002	Spacewatch	Kitt Peak	5.270	0.039	7.1	5.066	5.473	13 km	–	catalog · MPC · JPL
(222826) 2002 DS_{19}	22 February 2002	NEAT	Palomar	5.159	0.052	2.3	4.893	5.426	10 km	–	catalog · MPC · JPL
(222827) 2002 DP_{20}	22 February 2002	NEAT	Palomar	5.233	0.024	5.2	5.108	5.358	14 km	–	catalog · MPC · JPL
(222831) 2002 EE_{8}	12 March 2002	NEAT	Palomar	5.258	0.068	11.4	4.903	5.614	16 km	–	catalog · MPC · JPL
(222840) 2002 EC_{57}	13 March 2002	LINEAR	Socorro	5.140	0.090	5.0	4.675	5.605	15 km	–	catalog · MPC · JPL
(222843) 2002 EB_{80}	12 March 2002	NEAT	Palomar	5.139	0.103	6.0	4.611	5.667	13 km	–	catalog · MPC · JPL
(222844) 2002 EH_{82}	13 March 2002	NEAT	Palomar	5.211	0.134	5.2	4.511	5.912	16 km	–	catalog · MPC · JPL
(222847) 2002 EL_{85}	9 March 2002	LINEAR	Socorro	5.250	0.096	9.5	4.744	5.756	11 km	–	catalog · MPC · JPL
(222851) 2002 EA_{109}	9 March 2002	Spacewatch	Kitt Peak	5.238	0.111	0.6	4.654	5.822	11 km	–	catalog · MPC · JPL
(222854) 2002 EL_{119}	10 March 2002	Spacewatch	Kitt Peak	5.169	0.064	3.5	4.838	5.499	11 km	–	catalog · MPC · JPL
(222859) 2002 EX_{128}	13 March 2002	LINEAR	Socorro	5.224	0.082	13.8	4.797	5.652	18 km	–	catalog · MPC · JPL
(222861) 2002 EZ_{134}	13 March 2002	NEAT	Palomar	5.182	0.100	6.7	4.662	5.702	13 km	–	catalog · MPC · JPL
(222862) 2002 EA_{136}	12 March 2002	NEAT	Palomar	5.264	0.053	6.4	4.986	5.542	11 km	–	catalog · MPC · JPL
(222864) 2002 ET_{136}	12 March 2002	NEAT	Palomar	5.238	0.108	21.1	4.674	5.802	15 km	–	catalog · MPC · JPL
(222871) 2002 FA_{27}	20 March 2002	LINEAR	Socorro	5.133	0.096	12.7	4.642	5.624	12 km	–	catalog · MPC · JPL
(223238) 2003 EY_{42}	10 March 2003	Spacewatch	Kitt Peak	5.211	0.029	18.3	5.060	5.362	11 km	–	catalog · MPC · JPL
(223251) 2003 FB_{70}	26 March 2003	Spacewatch	Kitt Peak	5.134	0.074	8.7	4.753	5.516	18 km	–	catalog · MPC · JPL
(223268) 2003 GZ_{21}	7 April 2003	NEAT	Palomar	5.175	0.065	26.1	4.840	5.511	15 km	–	catalog · MPC · JPL
(223272) 2003 GC_{33}	1 April 2003	Deep Lens Survey	Cerro Tololo	5.305	0.073	6.9	4.918	5.692	13 km	–	catalog · MPC · JPL
(223615) 2004 HP_{72}	28 April 2004	Spacewatch	Kitt Peak	5.158	0.040	2.6	4.953	5.363	10 km	–	catalog · MPC · JPL
(223631) 2004 JJ_{54}	9 May 2004	Spacewatch	Kitt Peak	5.277	0.047	6.1	5.029	5.526	11 km	–	catalog · MPC · JPL
(224020) 2005 JL_{160}	7 May 2005	MLS	Mount Lemmon	5.098	0.020	28.0	4.994	5.201	17 km	–	catalog · MPC · JPL
(224782) 2006 JB_{42}	8 May 2006	MLS	Mount Lemmon	5.159	0.081	6.6	4.743	5.576	13 km	–	catalog · MPC · JPL
(224792) 2006 SF_{371}	25 September 2006	Sloan Digital Sky Survey	Apache Point	5.211	0.027	18.2	5.071	5.351	13 km	–	catalog · MPC · JPL
(224793) 2006 SG_{371}	27 September 2006	Sloan Digital Sky Survey	Apache Point	5.167	0.037	17.7	4.978	5.356	11 km	–	catalog · MPC · JPL
(225089) 2007 PG_{28}	14 August 2007	BATTeRS	Bisei SG Center	5.230	0.032	10.5	5.061	5.399	16 km	–	catalog · MPC · JPL
(225091) 2007 TJ_{350}	14 October 2007	MLS	Mount Lemmon	5.236	0.025	5.1	5.104	5.367	12 km	–	catalog · MPC · JPL
(225209) 2008 OT_{20}	29 July 2008	Spacewatch	Kitt Peak	5.115	0.041	6.2	4.903	5.326	11 km	–	catalog · MPC · JPL
(225210) 2008 QB_{31}	30 August 2008	LINEAR	Socorro	5.217	0.038	7.9	5.018	5.416	17 km	–	catalog · MPC · JPL
(225211) 2008 QG_{42}	23 August 2008	Spacewatch	Kitt Peak	5.280	0.053	4.2	4.999	5.561	10 km	–	catalog · MPC · JPL
(225212) 2008 RF_{25}	3 September 2008	R. A. Tucker	Goodricke-Pigott	5.143	0.103	6.3	4.614	5.673	12 km	–	catalog · MPC · JPL
(225213) 2008 RJ_{27}	8 September 2008	F. Kugel	Dauban	5.171	0.012	7.4	5.109	5.232	16 km	–	catalog · MPC · JPL
(225214) 2008 RM_{58}	3 September 2008	Spacewatch	Kitt Peak	5.232	0.108	6.5	4.667	5.797	11 km	–	catalog · MPC · JPL
(225215) 2008 RB_{65}	4 September 2008	Spacewatch	Kitt Peak	5.301	0.030	5.4	5.141	5.460	13 km	–	catalog · MPC · JPL
(225216) 2008 RV_{76}	6 September 2008	CSS	Catalina	5.188	0.120	2.1	4.566	5.809	10 km	–	catalog · MPC · JPL
(225217) 2008 RA_{83}	4 September 2008	Spacewatch	Kitt Peak	5.235	0.093	5.1	4.746	5.724	12 km	–	catalog · MPC · JPL
(225218) 2008 RD_{95}	7 September 2008	MLS	Mount Lemmon	5.106	0.044	2.4	4.881	5.330	8.9 km	–	catalog · MPC · JPL
(225219) 2008 RO_{126}	4 September 2008	Spacewatch	Kitt Peak	5.264	0.110	5.8	4.685	5.843	11 km	–	catalog · MPC · JPL
(225220) 2008 RX_{128}	5 September 2008	Spacewatch	Kitt Peak	5.254	0.061	6.5	4.931	5.577	11 km	–	catalog · MPC · JPL
(225221) 2008 SN_{22}	19 September 2008	Spacewatch	Kitt Peak	5.042	0.104	1.6	4.517	5.567	9.5 km	–	catalog · MPC · JPL
(225222) 2008 SP_{32}	20 September 2008	Spacewatch	Kitt Peak	5.178	0.079	6.2	4.767	5.589	14 km	–	catalog · MPC · JPL
(225223) 2008 SV_{36}	20 September 2008	MLS	Mount Lemmon	5.195	0.153	1.4	4.399	5.991	9.4 km	–	catalog · MPC · JPL
(225224) 2008 SH_{41}	20 September 2008	CSS	Catalina	5.258	0.067	6.6	4.904	5.612	16 km	–	catalog · MPC · JPL
(225226) 2008 SH_{213}	29 September 2008	MLS	Mount Lemmon	5.234	0.068	3.8	4.877	5.592	8.7 km	–	catalog · MPC · JPL
(225227) 2008 TO_{65}	2 October 2008	CSS	Catalina	5.226	0.081	6.5	4.803	5.649	13 km	–	catalog · MPC · JPL
(225228) 2008 TE_{92}	4 October 2008	OAM	La Sagra	5.330	0.072	5.5	4.944	5.716	16 km	–	catalog · MPC · JPL
(225229) 2008 TB_{149}	9 October 2008	MLS	Mount Lemmon	5.122	0.016	5.3	5.040	5.205	10 km	–	catalog · MPC · JPL
(225230) 2008 UX_{4}	25 October 2008	J. Hobart	Kachina	5.253	0.157	8.7	4.431	6.076	14 km	–	catalog · MPC · JPL
225276 Leitos	29 September 1973	C. J. van Houten; I. van Houten-Groeneveld; T. Gehrels	Palomar	5.199	0.157	6.1	4.383	6.015	11 km	–	catalog · MPC · JPL
(225294) 1995 QA_{6}	22 August 1995	Spacewatch	Kitt Peak	5.157	0.053	6.6	4.885	5.429	11 km	–	catalog · MPC · JPL
(225296) 1995 SQ_{67}	18 September 1995	Spacewatch	Kitt Peak	5.324	0.054	9.6	5.037	5.611	10 km	–	catalog · MPC · JPL
(225318) 1997 SU_{32}	28 September 1997	Spacewatch	Kitt Peak	5.300	0.085	20.9	4.847	5.752	12 km	–	catalog · MPC · JPL
(225319) 1997 TV_{19}	2 October 1997	Spacewatch	Kitt Peak	5.181	0.090	1.4	4.713	5.650	8.0 km	–	catalog · MPC · JPL
(225359) 1998 WJ_{24}	18 November 1998	M. W. Buie	Kitt Peak	5.119	0.082	7.4	4.699	5.539	9.8 km	–	catalog · MPC · JPL
(225623) 2001 BS_{16}	18 January 2001	LINEAR	Socorro	5.178	0.083	22.3	4.747	5.608	18 km	–	catalog · MPC · JPL
(225624) 2001 BJ_{39}	19 January 2001	Spacewatch	Kitt Peak	5.244	0.004	4.7	5.221	5.267	13 km	–	catalog · MPC · JPL
(225632) 2001 EX_{19}	15 March 2001	LONEOS	Anderson Mesa	5.243	0.096	9.6	4.739	5.747	15 km	–	catalog · MPC · JPL
(225984) 2002 CJ_{228}	6 February 2002	NEAT	Palomar	5.153	0.006	9.1	5.120	5.186	18 km	–	catalog · MPC · JPL
(225993) 2002 CF_{309}	10 February 2002	LINEAR	Socorro	5.201	0.020	10.1	5.095	5.307	15 km	–	catalog · MPC · JPL
(226005) 2002 EP_{14}	6 March 2002	NEAT	Palomar	5.163	0.040	7.4	4.954	5.372	12 km	–	catalog · MPC · JPL
(226022) 2002 EX_{112}	10 March 2002	Spacewatch	Kitt Peak	5.216	0.082	5.9	4.786	5.646	10 km	–	catalog · MPC · JPL
(226027) 2002 EK_{127}	12 March 2002	Spacewatch	Kitt Peak	5.206	0.091	31.1	4.730	5.682	13 km	–	catalog · MPC · JPL
(226030) 2002 ER_{153}	12 March 2002	Nyukasa	Nyukasa	5.248	0.124	9.5	4.595	5.901	11 km	–	catalog · MPC · JPL
(226033) 2002 FR_{18}	18 March 2002	M. W. Buie	Kitt Peak	5.173	0.090	2.2	4.709	5.637	10 km	–	catalog · MPC · JPL
(226036) 2002 FC_{32}	20 March 2002	LONEOS	Anderson Mesa	5.197	0.030	10.4	5.042	5.352	12 km	–	catalog · MPC · JPL
(226053) 2002 GD_{118}	12 April 2002	NEAT	Palomar	5.217	0.053	9.5	4.942	5.491	14 km	–	catalog · MPC · JPL
(226067) 2002 HQ_{14}	17 April 2002	Spacewatch	Kitt Peak	5.264	0.035	7.5	5.080	5.448	14 km	–	catalog · MPC · JPL
(226348) 2003 FW_{132}	23 March 2003	Spacewatch	Kitt Peak	5.177	0.095	6.1	4.684	5.669	11 km	–	catalog · MPC · JPL
(226349) 2003 FL_{133}	27 March 2003	Spacewatch	Kitt Peak	5.173	0.040	11.2	4.963	5.382	13 km	–	catalog · MPC · JPL
(226352) 2003 GZ_{13}	4 April 2003	Spacewatch	Kitt Peak	5.261	0.045	8.8	5.021	5.500	11 km	–	catalog · MPC · JPL
(226355) 2003 GR_{24}	7 April 2003	Spacewatch	Kitt Peak	5.137	0.085	9.2	4.700	5.574	13 km	–	catalog · MPC · JPL
(226358) 2003 GL_{56}	7 April 2003	Spacewatch	Kitt Peak	5.279	0.005	4.8	5.250	5.308	12 km	–	catalog · MPC · JPL
(226361) 2003 HP_{13}	25 April 2003	Spacewatch	Kitt Peak	5.188	0.076	13.2	4.795	5.580	15 km	–	catalog · MPC · JPL
(226367) 2003 HW_{58}	28 April 2003	Spacewatch	Kitt Peak	5.261	0.067	12.8	4.909	5.614	14 km	–	catalog · MPC · JPL
(226691) 2004 JA_{22}	9 May 2004	Spacewatch	Kitt Peak	5.248	0.120	16.6	4.616	5.881	13 km	–	catalog · MPC · JPL
(227077) 2005 LT_{18}	8 June 2005	Spacewatch	Kitt Peak	5.164	0.087	12.1	4.713	5.615	9.8 km	–	catalog · MPC · JPL
(227078) 2005 LZ_{18}	8 June 2005	Spacewatch	Kitt Peak	5.116	0.068	16.4	4.770	5.461	11 km	–	catalog · MPC · JPL
(227082) 2005 LY_{49}	11 June 2005	Spacewatch	Kitt Peak	5.275	0.097	14.2	4.761	5.788	11 km	–	catalog · MPC · JPL
(227759) 2006 MQ_{10}	20 June 2006	Spacewatch	Kitt Peak	5.221	0.105	7.4	4.675	5.766	10 km	–	catalog · MPC · JPL
(228004) 2007 QC_{5}	31 August 2007	K. Sárneczky; L. Kiss	Siding Spring	5.112	0.071	4.4	4.747	5.476	9.8 km	–	catalog · MPC · JPL
(228005) 2007 QR_{12}	16 August 2007	PMO NEO Survey Program	XuYi	5.262	0.022	6.6	5.145	5.378	12 km	–	catalog · MPC · JPL
(228006) 2007 RL_{6}	3 September 2007	R. Ferrando	Pla D'Arguines	5.225	0.100	5.9	4.702	5.748	14 km	–	catalog · MPC · JPL
(228007) 2007 RE_{27}	4 September 2007	MLS	Mount Lemmon	5.279	0.085	7.3	4.832	5.727	11 km	–	catalog · MPC · JPL
(228008) 2007 RG_{157}	11 September 2007	MLS	Mount Lemmon	5.254	0.042	7.0	5.034	5.475	12 km	–	catalog · MPC · JPL
(228009) 2007 RL_{162}	14 September 2007	LONEOS	Anderson Mesa	5.197	0.050	6.5	4.938	5.457	13 km	–	catalog · MPC · JPL
(228010) 2007 RL_{164}	10 September 2007	Spacewatch	Kitt Peak	5.252	0.008	3.4	5.211	5.292	11 km	–	catalog · MPC · JPL
(228011) 2007 RB_{288}	11 September 2007	MLS	Mount Lemmon	5.383	0.038	3.8	5.178	5.588	14 km	–	catalog · MPC · JPL
(228071) 2008 OT_{22}	30 July 2008	Spacewatch	Kitt Peak	5.146	0.052	0.9	4.880	5.411	9.2 km	–	catalog · MPC · JPL
(228077) 2008 QD_{6}	25 August 2008	F. Kugel	Dauban	5.213	0.109	16.1	4.648	5.779	14 km	–	catalog · MPC · JPL
(228084) 2008 RV_{3}	2 September 2008	Spacewatch	Kitt Peak	5.185	0.020	3.7	5.078	5.291	9.0 km	–	catalog · MPC · JPL
(228085) 2008 RT_{29}	2 September 2008	Spacewatch	Kitt Peak	5.137	0.032	4.3	4.972	5.303	11 km	–	catalog · MPC · JPL
(228086) 2008 RX_{78}	9 September 2008	W. Bickel	Bergisch Gladbach	5.316	0.024	7.9	5.188	5.444	12 km	–	catalog · MPC · JPL
(228088) 2008 RM_{105}	6 September 2008	MLS	Mount Lemmon	5.262	0.002	2.6	5.250	5.273	9.8 km	–	catalog · MPC · JPL
(228089) 2008 RV_{126}	4 September 2008	Spacewatch	Kitt Peak	5.203	0.072	5.1	4.828	5.578	10 km	–	catalog · MPC · JPL
(228090) 2008 RE_{127}	5 September 2008	Spacewatch	Kitt Peak	5.237	0.017	7.9	5.149	5.326	11 km	–	catalog · MPC · JPL
(228095) 2008 SF_{24}	19 September 2008	Spacewatch	Kitt Peak	5.212	0.126	3.7	4.555	5.870	10 km	–	catalog · MPC · JPL
(228096) 2008 SA_{27}	19 September 2008	Spacewatch	Kitt Peak	5.184	0.093	9.6	4.701	5.666	11 km	–	catalog · MPC · JPL
(228097) 2008 SQ_{31}	20 September 2008	Spacewatch	Kitt Peak	5.281	0.092	6.1	4.793	5.770	10 km	–	catalog · MPC · JPL
(228098) 2008 SM_{38}	20 September 2008	Spacewatch	Kitt Peak	5.301	0.006	7.3	5.267	5.335	11 km	–	catalog · MPC · JPL
(228099) 2008 SC_{51}	20 September 2008	MLS	Mount Lemmon	5.177	0.078	0.2	4.775	5.578	8.6 km	–	catalog · MPC · JPL
(228101) 2008 SP_{154}	22 September 2008	LINEAR	Socorro	5.128	0.062	4.6	4.809	5.446	13 km	–	catalog · MPC · JPL
(228102) 2008 SY_{172}	22 September 2008	CSS	Catalina	5.146	0.066	26.1	4.809	5.484	18 km	–	catalog · MPC · JPL
(228103) 2008 SA_{192}	25 September 2008	Spacewatch	Kitt Peak	5.233	0.030	4.4	5.079	5.388	13 km	–	catalog · MPC · JPL
(228104) 2008 SF_{197}	25 September 2008	Spacewatch	Kitt Peak	5.192	0.041	2.5	4.979	5.406	11 km	–	catalog · MPC · JPL
(228105) 2008 SA_{224}	26 September 2008	Spacewatch	Kitt Peak	5.175	0.023	5.1	5.058	5.292	11 km	–	catalog · MPC · JPL
(228106) 2008 SZ_{229}	28 September 2008	MLS	Mount Lemmon	5.283	0.072	10.3	4.902	5.664	15 km	–	catalog · MPC · JPL
(228107) 2008 SS_{231}	28 September 2008	MLS	Mount Lemmon	5.188	0.028	4.7	5.041	5.335	9.1 km	–	catalog · MPC · JPL
(228108) 2008 SU_{277}	25 September 2008	MLS	Mount Lemmon	5.206	0.092	1.6	4.728	5.684	12 km	–	catalog · MPC · JPL
228110 Eudorus	7 October 2008	L. A. Molnar	Calvin-Rehoboth	5.325	0.035	1.5	5.141	5.510	10 km	–	catalog · MPC · JPL
(228111) 2008 TK_{10}	8 October 2008	B. L. Stevens	Desert Moon	5.179	0.029	8.5	5.031	5.327	10 km	–	catalog · MPC · JPL
(228112) 2008 TG_{35}	1 October 2008	MLS	Mount Lemmon	5.271	0.096	5.4	4.762	5.780	11 km	–	catalog · MPC · JPL
(228113) 2008 TZ_{50}	2 October 2008	Spacewatch	Kitt Peak	5.318	0.034	1.8	5.138	5.497	13 km	–	catalog · MPC · JPL
(228114) 2008 TB_{61}	2 October 2008	CSS	Catalina	5.148	0.019	14.0	5.047	5.248	17 km	–	catalog · MPC · JPL
(228115) 2008 TK_{76}	2 October 2008	MLS	Mount Lemmon	5.247	0.075	7.4	4.852	5.642	13 km	–	catalog · MPC · JPL
(228116) 2008 TK_{82}	3 October 2008	OAM	La Sagra	5.160	0.011	7.0	5.105	5.215	13 km	–	catalog · MPC · JPL
(228117) 2008 TJ_{93}	5 October 2008	OAM	La Sagra	5.159	0.043	4.9	4.936	5.382	12 km	–	catalog · MPC · JPL
(228118) 2008 TZ_{111}	6 October 2008	CSS	Catalina	5.289	0.061	6.9	4.968	5.611	14 km	–	catalog · MPC · JPL
(228119) 2008 TM_{136}	8 October 2008	Spacewatch	Kitt Peak	5.285	0.052	5.1	5.010	5.559	11 km	–	catalog · MPC · JPL
(228120) 2008 TV_{139}	8 October 2008	MLS	Mount Lemmon	5.257	0.066	4.7	4.912	5.602	12 km	–	catalog · MPC · JPL
(228121) 2008 TN_{175}	9 October 2008	Spacewatch	Kitt Peak	5.175	0.043	7.7	4.954	5.397	8.2 km	–	catalog · MPC · JPL
(228122) 2008 UH_{11}	17 October 2008	Spacewatch	Kitt Peak	5.268	0.042	4.2	5.045	5.490	10 km	–	catalog · MPC · JPL
(228123) 2008 UH_{45}	20 October 2008	MLS	Mount Lemmon	5.222	0.096	5.9	4.719	5.725	9.2 km	–	catalog · MPC · JPL
(228124) 2008 YC_{7}	23 December 2008	F. Hormuth	Calar Alto	5.220	0.205	12.1	4.150	6.291	13 km	–	catalog · MPC · JPL
(228125) 2008 YV_{30}	31 December 2008	CSS	Catalina	5.156	0.043	10.8	4.935	5.376	17 km	–	catalog · MPC · JPL
(228140) 2009 RT_{33}	14 September 2009	Spacewatch	Kitt Peak	5.187	0.134	20.0	4.492	5.882	14 km	–	catalog · MPC · JPL
(228148) 2009 SH_{19}	22 September 2009	S. Karge; U. Zimmer	Taunus	5.279	0.031	5.5	5.114	5.445	13 km	–	catalog · MPC · JPL
(228150) 2009 SJ_{38}	16 September 2009	Spacewatch	Kitt Peak	5.210	0.121	3.4	4.580	5.840	10 km	–	catalog · MPC · JPL
(228155) 2009 SF_{61}	17 September 2009	Spacewatch	Kitt Peak	5.191	0.173	20.6	4.294	6.088	16 km	–	catalog · MPC · JPL
(228162) 2009 SO_{141}	19 September 2009	Spacewatch	Kitt Peak	5.223	0.025	4.3	5.095	5.352	10 km	–	catalog · MPC · JPL
(228239) 1998 TK_{21}	13 October 1998	Spacewatch	Kitt Peak	5.157	0.129	4.4	4.493	5.820	12 km	–	catalog · MPC · JPL
(228290) 2000 CS_{69}	1 February 2000	Spacewatch	Kitt Peak	5.356	0.061	5.3	5.031	5.681	7.8 km	–	catalog · MPC · JPL
(229760) 2007 RM_{225}	10 September 2007	Spacewatch	Kitt Peak	5.170	0.072	3.3	4.799	5.541	11 km	–	catalog · MPC · JPL
(229761) 2007 RC_{288}	11 September 2007	MLS	Mount Lemmon	5.142	0.050	5.5	4.882	5.401	9.6 km	–	catalog · MPC · JPL
(229808) 2008 SB_{148}	26 September 2008	Spacewatch	Kitt Peak	5.245	0.063	1.8	4.913	5.578	14 km	–	catalog · MPC · JPL
(229809) 2008 SA_{164}	28 September 2008	LINEAR	Socorro	5.251	0.025	12.6	5.120	5.382	13 km	–	catalog · MPC · JPL
(229811) 2008 ST_{187}	25 September 2008	Spacewatch	Kitt Peak	5.362	0.069	3.8	4.990	5.734	11 km	–	catalog · MPC · JPL
(229813) 2008 SW_{223}	25 September 2008	MLS	Mount Lemmon	5.207	0.078	6.1	4.801	5.612	10 km	–	catalog · MPC · JPL
(229816) 2008 SY_{261}	24 September 2008	Spacewatch	Kitt Peak	5.209	0.048	3.1	4.959	5.458	8.9 km	–	catalog · MPC · JPL
(229822) 2008 TA_{112}	6 October 2008	CSS	Catalina	5.244	0.046	6.0	5.001	5.487	14 km	–	catalog · MPC · JPL
(229826) 2008 UK_{8}	17 October 2008	Spacewatch	Kitt Peak	5.289	0.083	1.0	4.852	5.726	12 km	–	catalog · MPC · JPL
(229832) 2008 WQ_{33}	17 November 2008	Spacewatch	Kitt Peak	5.210	0.058	2.3	4.908	5.512	8.7 km	–	catalog · MPC · JPL
(229851) 2009 SQ_{267}	23 September 2009	MLS	Mount Lemmon	5.297	0.048	23.3	5.041	5.552	17 km	–	catalog · MPC · JPL
(229859) 2009 TD_{6}	12 October 2009	OAM	La Sagra	5.243	0.135	10.1	4.534	5.951	14 km	–	catalog · MPC · JPL
(229878) 2009 UE_{40}	18 October 2009	OAM	La Sagra	5.261	0.132	14.3	4.567	5.955	10 km	–	catalog · MPC · JPL
(229902) 2009 VA_{81}	15 November 2009	CSS	Catalina	5.228	0.020	8.4	5.121	5.335	12 km	–	catalog · MPC · JPL
(229998) 2000 CG_{106}	5 February 2000	M. W. Buie	Kitt Peak	5.266	0.094	7.6	4.771	5.762	13 km	–	catalog · MPC · JPL
(230339) 2002 CD_{200}	10 February 2002	LINEAR	Socorro	5.118	0.045	13.7	4.888	5.348	11 km	–	catalog · MPC · JPL
(231464) 2007 PR_{4}	7 August 2007	Astronomical Research Observatory	Charleston	5.245	0.058	10.2	4.939	5.551	11 km	–	catalog · MPC · JPL
(231493) 2008 QT_{19}	29 August 2008	F. Kugel	Dauban	5.137	0.068	17.6	4.787	5.488	12 km	–	catalog · MPC · JPL
(231509) 2008 RT_{69}	5 September 2008	Spacewatch	Kitt Peak	5.300	0.090	7.7	4.823	5.777	13 km	–	catalog · MPC · JPL
(231516) 2008 RK_{124}	6 September 2008	MLS	Mount Lemmon	5.249	0.072	3.1	4.871	5.627	12 km	–	catalog · MPC · JPL
(231572) 2008 UN_{9}	17 October 2008	Spacewatch	Kitt Peak	5.135	0.024	4.6	5.014	5.257	11 km	–	catalog · MPC · JPL
(231610) 2009 RK_{12}	12 September 2009	Spacewatch	Kitt Peak	5.216	0.122	0.6	4.579	5.853	8.0 km	–	catalog · MPC · JPL
(231612) 2009 RO_{64}	15 September 2009	Spacewatch	Kitt Peak	5.213	0.015	4.2	5.137	5.289	11 km	–	catalog · MPC · JPL
(231613) 2009 SQ_{25}	16 September 2009	Spacewatch	Kitt Peak	5.078	0.120	13.1	4.469	5.687	14 km	–	catalog · MPC · JPL
(231615) 2009 SK_{78}	18 September 2009	Spacewatch	Kitt Peak	5.163	0.098	25.4	4.656	5.670	15 km	–	catalog · MPC · JPL
(231620) 2009 SY_{128}	18 September 2009	Spacewatch	Kitt Peak	5.204	0.125	3.1	4.556	5.853	10 km	–	catalog · MPC · JPL
(231621) 2009 SB_{132}	18 September 2009	Spacewatch	Kitt Peak	5.162	0.064	5.4	4.831	5.493	10 km	–	catalog · MPC · JPL
(231623) 2009 SR_{207}	23 September 2009	Spacewatch	Kitt Peak	5.129	0.099	18.7	4.622	5.637	14 km	–	catalog · MPC · JPL
(231631) 2009 TV_{41}	12 October 2009	OAM	La Sagra	5.122	0.059	9.5	4.818	5.426	14 km	–	catalog · MPC · JPL
(231636) 2009 UP_{84}	23 October 2009	MLS	Mount Lemmon	5.279	0.028	6.5	5.131	5.427	11 km	–	catalog · MPC · JPL
(231664) 2009 YL_{6}	20 December 2009	MLS	Mount Lemmon	5.111	0.045	4.5	4.882	5.340	13 km	–	catalog · MPC · JPL
231666 Aisymnos	24 September 1960	L. D. Schmadel; R. M. Stoss	Palomar	5.306	0.053	5.3	5.023	5.589	13 km	–	catalog · MPC · JPL
(231692) 1997 WK_{14}	22 November 1997	Spacewatch	Kitt Peak	5.319	0.038	13.1	5.115	5.522	13 km	–	catalog · MPC · JPL
(233578) 2007 QK_{5}	16 August 2007	PMO NEO Survey Program	XuYi	5.228	0.075	19.9	4.838	5.619	17 km	–	catalog · MPC · JPL
(233600) 2007 RO_{168}	10 September 2007	Spacewatch	Kitt Peak	5.278	0.056	4.2	4.984	5.572	13 km	–	catalog · MPC · JPL
(233683) 2008 RG_{113}	5 September 2008	Spacewatch	Kitt Peak	5.202	0.093	5.9	4.716	5.688	10 km	–	catalog · MPC · JPL
(233773) 2008 TU_{146}	9 October 2008	MLS	Mount Lemmon	5.181	0.096	3.2	4.685	5.678	8.2 km	–	catalog · MPC · JPL
(233790) 2008 UY_{23}	20 October 2008	Spacewatch	Kitt Peak	5.177	0.053	6.0	4.903	5.452	11 km	–	catalog · MPC · JPL
(233827) 2008 UF_{244}	26 October 2008	MLS	Mount Lemmon	5.289	0.067	13.2	4.936	5.642	13 km	–	catalog · MPC · JPL
(233915) 2009 RE_{73}	14 September 2009	Spacewatch	Kitt Peak	5.134	0.051	4.4	4.872	5.397	11 km	–	catalog · MPC · JPL
(233918) 2009 SU_{146}	19 September 2009	Spacewatch	Kitt Peak	5.114	0.074	7.5	4.735	5.493	9.3 km	–	catalog · MPC · JPL
(233925) 2009 UL_{2}	18 October 2009	F. Tozzi	Tzec Maun	5.251	0.149	13.5	4.467	6.034	16 km	–	catalog · MPC · JPL
(236878) 2007 RJ_{283}	11 September 2007	CSS	Catalina	5.236	0.069	12.4	4.873	5.598	13 km	–	catalog · MPC · JPL
(237025) 2008 SY_{39}	20 September 2008	Spacewatch	Kitt Peak	5.374	0.045	3.0	5.130	5.617	12 km	–	catalog · MPC · JPL
(237035) 2008 SL_{91}	21 September 2008	Spacewatch	Kitt Peak	5.264	0.069	6.7	4.898	5.629	12 km	–	catalog · MPC · JPL
(237332) 2009 UN_{87}	24 October 2009	CSS	Catalina	5.301	0.099	13.6	4.774	5.829	13 km	–	catalog · MPC · JPL
(237338) 2009 WS_{60}	16 November 2009	MLS	Mount Lemmon	5.298	0.052	14.6	5.020	5.576	14 km	–	catalog · MPC · JPL
(241573) 1995 QE_{9}	28 August 1995	Spacewatch	Kitt Peak	5.234	0.053	7.8	4.956	5.512	14 km	–	catalog · MPC · JPL
(241576) 1995 SE_{31}	20 September 1995	Spacewatch	Kitt Peak	5.255	0.048	10.3	5.005	5.505	12 km	–	catalog · MPC · JPL
(241581) 1996 RF_{14}	8 September 1996	Spacewatch	Kitt Peak	5.203	0.022	9.0	5.088	5.319	12 km	–	catalog · MPC · JPL
(241582) 1996 RY_{30}	13 September 1996	Uppsala-DLR Trojan Survey	La Silla	5.177	0.058	15.8	4.875	5.480	13 km	–	catalog · MPC · JPL
(241589) 1997 SG_{14}	28 September 1997	Spacewatch	Kitt Peak	5.165	0.078	10.4	4.760	5.571	11 km	–	catalog · MPC · JPL
(241643) 2000 AJ_{206}	3 January 2000	Spacewatch	Kitt Peak	5.251	0.060	23.3	4.937	5.565	16 km	–	catalog · MPC · JPL
(241754) 2001 CA_{1}	1 February 2001	LINEAR	Socorro	5.257	0.129	10.0	4.579	5.936	14 km	–	catalog · MPC · JPL
(241956) 2002 ET_{8}	12 March 2002	NEAT	Palomar	5.183	0.065	13.9	4.847	5.518	11 km	–	catalog · MPC · JPL
(241958) 2002 ED_{72}	13 March 2002	LINEAR	Socorro	5.183	0.107	18.9	4.630	5.736	13 km	–	catalog · MPC · JPL
(242177) 2003 HN_{24}	25 April 2003	Spacewatch	Kitt Peak	5.211	0.100	9.1	4.690	5.733	10 km	–	catalog · MPC · JPL
(242597) 2005 JY_{28}	3 May 2005	Spacewatch	Kitt Peak	5.122	0.089	10.6	4.668	5.576	10 km	–	catalog · MPC · JPL
(242624) 2005 KH_{13}	21 May 2005	MLS	Mount Lemmon	5.235	0.053	12.5	4.959	5.510	12 km	–	catalog · MPC · JPL
(242917) 2006 OZ_{2}	19 July 2006	LUSS	Lulin	5.273	0.066	14.8	4.924	5.623	11 km	–	catalog · MPC · JPL
(243084) 2007 NL_{7}	11 July 2007	Siding Spring Survey	Siding Spring	5.232	0.050	17.2	4.968	5.495	18 km	–	catalog · MPC · JPL
(243088) 2007 PL_{45}	11 August 2007	Siding Spring Survey	Siding Spring	5.272	0.073	17.8	4.889	5.655	17 km	–	catalog · MPC · JPL
(243159) 2007 TD_{74}	14 October 2007	MLS	Mount Lemmon	5.230	0.105	35.9	4.681	5.780	18 km	–	catalog · MPC · JPL
(243313) 2008 RH_{3}	2 September 2008	Spacewatch	Kitt Peak	5.144	0.067	2.3	4.799	5.490	9.9 km	–	catalog · MPC · JPL
(243314) 2008 RA_{15}	4 September 2008	Spacewatch	Kitt Peak	5.217	0.046	5.4	4.976	5.458	14 km	–	catalog · MPC · JPL
(243315) 2008 RP_{18}	4 September 2008	Spacewatch	Kitt Peak	5.245	0.047	9.7	5.000	5.490	9.7 km	–	catalog · MPC · JPL
(243316) 2008 RL_{32}	2 September 2008	Spacewatch	Kitt Peak	5.196	0.041	31.3	4.984	5.408	11 km	–	catalog · MPC · JPL
(243318) 2008 RS_{101}	2 September 2008	Spacewatch	Kitt Peak	5.221	0.021	19.6	5.110	5.333	12 km	–	catalog · MPC · JPL
(243322) 2008 SG_{31}	20 September 2008	Spacewatch	Kitt Peak	5.185	0.093	6.9	4.700	5.669	12 km	–	catalog · MPC · JPL
(243323) 2008 SO_{36}	20 September 2008	MLS	Mount Lemmon	5.197	0.079	4.6	4.785	5.609	14 km	–	catalog · MPC · JPL
(243325) 2008 SR_{154}	22 September 2008	LINEAR	Socorro	5.219	0.062	18.7	4.897	5.541	13 km	–	catalog · MPC · JPL
(243334) 2008 TY_{109}	6 October 2008	MLS	Mount Lemmon	5.270	0.019	8.6	5.171	5.368	13 km	–	catalog · MPC · JPL
(243460) 2009 RA_{54}	15 September 2009	Spacewatch	Kitt Peak	5.175	0.011	12.7	5.117	5.234	14 km	–	catalog · MPC · JPL
(243479) 2009 TY_{5}	11 October 2009	OAM	La Sagra	5.234	0.061	11.0	4.914	5.555	11 km	–	catalog · MPC · JPL
(243484) 2009 TA_{23}	14 October 2009	OAM	La Sagra	5.273	0.053	13.3	4.994	5.553	13 km	–	catalog · MPC · JPL
(243490) 2009 UF_{19}	23 October 2009	Mayhill	Mayhill	5.168	0.045	13.9	4.938	5.398	19 km	–	catalog · MPC · JPL
(243494) 2009 UF_{74}	21 October 2009	MLS	Mount Lemmon	5.274	0.124	7.4	4.619	5.929	11 km	–	catalog · MPC · JPL
(243496) 2009 UV_{105}	21 October 2009	MLS	Mount Lemmon	5.295	0.032	20.0	5.128	5.463	15 km	–	catalog · MPC · JPL
(243499) 2009 UA_{131}	30 October 2009	MLS	Mount Lemmon	5.100	0.033	16.6	4.934	5.266	13 km	–	catalog · MPC · JPL
(243501) 2009 UR_{139}	24 October 2009	MLS	Mount Lemmon	5.255	0.029	12.3	5.102	5.408	15 km	–	catalog · MPC · JPL
(243504) 2009 VD_{77}	8 November 2009	CSS	Catalina	5.221	0.077	20.2	4.821	5.621	12 km	–	catalog · MPC · JPL
(243509) 2009 WB_{80}	18 November 2009	Spacewatch	Kitt Peak	5.223	0.067	30.0	4.875	5.570	11 km	–	catalog · MPC · JPL
(246145) 2007 PE_{9}	11 August 2007	Chante-Perdrix	Dauban	5.139	0.095	7.8	4.653	5.625	12 km	–	catalog · MPC · JPL
(246147) 2007 PM_{16}	8 August 2007	LINEAR	Socorro	5.216	0.079	18.0	4.806	5.626	13 km	–	catalog · MPC · JPL
(246546) 2008 SM_{12}	24 September 2008	Spacewatch	Kitt Peak	5.238	0.090	7.8	4.768	5.707	11 km	–	catalog · MPC · JPL
(246550) 2008 SO_{47}	20 September 2008	CSS	Catalina	5.122	0.226	6.7	3.962	6.281	15 km	–	catalog · MPC · JPL
(246560) 2008 SA_{158}	24 September 2008	LINEAR	Socorro	5.189	0.083	6.6	4.757	5.621	12 km	–	catalog · MPC · JPL
(246831) 2009 UK_{81}	22 October 2009	MLS	Mount Lemmon	5.204	0.079	11.5	4.793	5.615	12 km	–	catalog · MPC · JPL
(246833) 2009 UD_{136}	24 October 2009	CSS	Catalina	5.187	0.088	7.8	4.730	5.644	14 km	–	catalog · MPC · JPL
(247019) 1999 XJ_{55}	7 December 1999	LINEAR	Socorro	5.116	0.024	36.7	4.995	5.237	20 km	–	catalog · MPC · JPL
(247409) 2002 CF_{79}	7 February 2002	LINEAR	Socorro	5.147	0.063	6.9	4.825	5.469	14 km	–	catalog · MPC · JPL
(247421) 2002 CD_{272}	8 February 2002	LONEOS	Anderson Mesa	5.232	0.089	12.1	4.767	5.697	17 km	–	catalog · MPC · JPL
(247437) 2002 EJ_{11}	12 March 2002	NEAT	Palomar	5.230	0.115	18.0	4.627	5.834	17 km	–	catalog · MPC · JPL
(248048) 2004 HD_{70}	24 April 2004	Spacewatch	Kitt Peak	5.178	0.137	34.7	4.466	5.889	17 km	–	catalog · MPC · JPL
(249005) 2007 PB_{9}	9 August 2007	Chante-Perdrix	Dauban	5.215	0.109	22.6	4.647	5.782	16 km	–	catalog · MPC · JPL
(249032) 2007 TA	1 October 2007	G. Hug	Eskridge	5.193	0.095	13.6	4.701	5.684	11 km	–	catalog · MPC · JPL
(249241) 2008 OU_{22}	29 July 2008	Spacewatch	Kitt Peak	5.152	0.036	3.4	4.964	5.340	12 km	–	catalog · MPC · JPL
(249247) 2008 RV_{9}	3 September 2008	Spacewatch	Kitt Peak	5.318	0.094	6.7	4.819	5.818	12 km	–	catalog · MPC · JPL
(249256) 2008 SH_{38}	20 September 2008	Spacewatch	Kitt Peak	5.258	0.013	7.3	5.188	5.329	12 km	–	catalog · MPC · JPL
(249258) 2008 SP_{53}	20 September 2008	MLS	Mount Lemmon	5.196	0.010	8.2	5.145	5.247	12 km	–	catalog · MPC · JPL
(249481) 2009 TE_{23}	14 October 2009	OAM	La Sagra	5.269	0.085	8.7	4.819	5.719	14 km	–	catalog · MPC · JPL
(249486) 2009 UO_{69}	21 October 2009	CSS	Catalina	5.282	0.070	7.8	4.911	5.653	12 km	–	catalog · MPC · JPL
(251536) 2008 SK_{257}	22 September 2008	Spacewatch	Kitt Peak	5.299	0.059	10.8	4.988	5.611	14 km	–	catalog · MPC · JPL
(251701) 1996 TD_{16}	4 October 1996	Spacewatch	Kitt Peak	5.253	0.067	6.8	4.903	5.603	12 km	–	catalog · MPC · JPL
(251702) 1996 TS_{16}	4 October 1996	Spacewatch	Kitt Peak	5.230	0.018	8.0	5.138	5.321	12 km	–	catalog · MPC · JPL
(251742) 1998 VD_{57}	14 November 1998	Spacewatch	Kitt Peak	5.138	0.051	5.5	4.876	5.399	11 km	–	catalog · MPC · JPL
(251743) 1998 WO_{24}	18 November 1998	M. W. Buie	Kitt Peak	5.170	0.127	0.6	4.515	5.824	9.4 km	–	catalog · MPC · JPL
(251744) 1998 WS_{24}	19 November 1998	M. W. Buie	Kitt Peak	5.167	0.071	2.7	4.799	5.536	9.0 km	–	catalog · MPC · JPL
(252159) 2001 CN_{10}	1 February 2001	LINEAR	Socorro	5.280	0.068	20.2	4.923	5.637	17 km	–	catalog · MPC · JPL
(252173) 2001 DL_{10}	17 February 2001	LINEAR	Socorro	5.200	0.123	13.9	4.563	5.838	17 km	–	catalog · MPC · JPL
(252179) 2001 DN_{60}	19 February 2001	LINEAR	Socorro	5.178	0.110	4.5	4.606	5.751	12 km	–	catalog · MPC · JPL
(252683) 2002 AE_{166}	13 January 2002	LINEAR	Socorro	5.128	0.036	6.0	4.943	5.312	13 km	–	catalog · MPC · JPL
(252698) 2002 CL_{54}	7 February 2002	LINEAR	Socorro	5.218	0.078	3.6	4.812	5.623	13 km	–	catalog · MPC · JPL
(252702) 2002 CB_{91}	7 February 2002	LINEAR	Socorro	5.107	0.111	5.4	4.542	5.672	14 km	–	catalog · MPC · JPL
(252711) 2002 CU_{152}	10 February 2002	LINEAR	Socorro	5.195	0.054	6.9	4.916	5.474	12 km	–	catalog · MPC · JPL
(252720) 2002 CE_{201}	10 February 2002	LINEAR	Socorro	5.121	0.067	11.3	4.779	5.463	13 km	–	catalog · MPC · JPL
(252724) 2002 CN_{228}	6 February 2002	NEAT	Palomar	5.222	0.033	7.5	5.049	5.395	16 km	–	catalog · MPC · JPL
(252737) 2002 CW_{306}	7 February 2002	LINEAR	Socorro	5.095	0.097	17.6	4.603	5.587	12 km	–	catalog · MPC · JPL
(252740) 2002 CO_{315}	14 February 2002	Uppsala-DLR Asteroid Survey	Kvistaberg	5.200	0.185	17.8	4.237	6.164	16 km	–	catalog · MPC · JPL
(252741) 2002 CW_{315}	12 February 2002	Spacewatch	Kitt Peak	5.235	0.070	0.9	4.867	5.602	9.6 km	–	catalog · MPC · JPL
(252742) 2002 DG_{19}	24 February 2002	NEAT	Palomar	5.205	0.068	2.7	4.851	5.559	10 km	–	catalog · MPC · JPL
(252743) 2002 EJ_{1}	6 March 2002	P. Kušnirák	Ondrejov	5.216	0.094	9.8	4.724	5.707	12 km	–	catalog · MPC · JPL
(252746) 2002 EX_{5}	11 March 2002	NEAT	Palomar	5.292	0.069	9.4	4.928	5.656	14 km	–	catalog · MPC · JPL
(252762) 2002 EY_{58}	13 March 2002	LINEAR	Socorro	5.195	0.087	9.6	4.743	5.647	16 km	–	catalog · MPC · JPL
(252849) 2002 GA_{139}	13 April 2002	NEAT	Palomar	5.244	0.105	22.0	4.695	5.793	17 km	–	catalog · MPC · JPL
(253330) 2003 ER_{63}	12 March 2003	Spacewatch	Kitt Peak	5.271	0.027	7.0	5.130	5.412	14 km	–	catalog · MPC · JPL
(253340) 2003 FF_{39}	24 March 2003	Spacewatch	Kitt Peak	5.177	0.069	5.4	4.821	5.534	11 km	–	catalog · MPC · JPL
(253343) 2003 FC_{48}	24 March 2003	Spacewatch	Kitt Peak	5.138	0.139	6.8	4.425	5.850	10 km	–	catalog · MPC · JPL
(253347) 2003 FJ_{64}	26 March 2003	NEAT	Palomar	5.175	0.031	8.6	5.014	5.336	14 km	–	catalog · MPC · JPL
(253348) 2003 FP_{71}	26 March 2003	Spacewatch	Kitt Peak	5.177	0.074	11.5	4.793	5.562	14 km	–	catalog · MPC · JPL
(253356) 2003 FA_{133}	24 March 2003	Spacewatch	Kitt Peak	5.145	0.070	3.0	4.785	5.505	10 km	–	catalog · MPC · JPL
(253357) 2003 FO_{133}	27 March 2003	Spacewatch	Kitt Peak	5.181	0.064	3.6	4.851	5.511	9.1 km	–	catalog · MPC · JPL
(253362) 2003 GL_{24}	7 April 2003	Spacewatch	Kitt Peak	5.242	0.054	11.4	4.957	5.527	12 km	–	catalog · MPC · JPL
(253364) 2003 GO_{27}	7 April 2003	Spacewatch	Kitt Peak	5.175	0.064	6.6	4.842	5.508	10 km	–	catalog · MPC · JPL
(253377) 2003 HC_{43}	29 April 2003	Spacewatch	Kitt Peak	5.221	0.050	8.6	4.960	5.481	12 km	–	catalog · MPC · JPL
(253380) 2003 HY_{58}	30 April 2003	Spacewatch	Kitt Peak	5.266	0.089	17.2	4.796	5.736	14 km	–	catalog · MPC · JPL
(253382) 2003 JG_{8}	2 May 2003	LINEAR	Socorro	5.288	0.035	19.9	5.102	5.473	19 km	–	catalog · MPC · JPL
(254079) 2004 HT_{78}	25 April 2004	Spacewatch	Kitt Peak	5.158	0.053	12.4	4.885	5.431	13 km	–	catalog · MPC · JPL
(254465) 2005 CC_{69}	9 February 2005	A. Boattini; H. Scholl	La Silla	5.204	0.046	1.7	4.964	5.445	9.1 km	–	catalog · MPC · JPL
(254630) 2005 JJ_{60}	8 May 2005	Spacewatch	Kitt Peak	5.065	0.029	7.1	4.917	5.214	12 km	–	catalog · MPC · JPL
(254669) 2005 LO_{19}	8 June 2005	Spacewatch	Kitt Peak	5.155	0.073	18.1	4.779	5.531	19 km	–	catalog · MPC · JPL
(254679) 2005 LU_{50}	13 June 2005	Spacewatch	Kitt Peak	5.172	0.122	13.5	4.544	5.801	14 km	–	catalog · MPC · JPL
(254681) 2005 MU_{3}	16 June 2005	Spacewatch	Kitt Peak	5.171	0.039	15.1	4.972	5.370	16 km	–	catalog · MPC · JPL
(254682) 2005 MW_{3}	16 June 2005	Spacewatch	Kitt Peak	5.179	0.074	11.0	4.794	5.563	11 km	–	catalog · MPC · JPL
(254691) 2005 MG_{24}	29 June 2005	Spacewatch	Kitt Peak	5.188	0.076	30.7	4.793	5.583	13 km	–	catalog · MPC · JPL
(256550) 2007 LV_{14}	11 June 2007	D. D. Balam	Mauna Kea	5.244	0.129	6.2	4.568	5.921	12 km	–	catalog · MPC · JPL
(256553) 2007 PT_{4}	8 August 2007	Astronomical Research Observatory	Charleston	5.160	0.101	6.1	4.638	5.682	11 km	–	catalog · MPC · JPL
(256556) 2007 RD_{237}	14 September 2007	Spacewatch	Kitt Peak	5.200	0.026	3.8	5.066	5.333	10 km	–	catalog · MPC · JPL
(257193) 2008 PK_{19}	7 August 2008	Spacewatch	Kitt Peak	5.285	0.056	0.8	4.986	5.583	10 km	–	catalog · MPC · JPL
(257195) 2008 QY_{41}	29 August 2008	Pises	Pises	5.117	0.065	9.1	4.783	5.450	11 km	–	catalog · MPC · JPL
(257196) 2008 RE_{3}	2 September 2008	Spacewatch	Kitt Peak	5.288	0.039	2.1	5.080	5.496	8.8 km	–	catalog · MPC · JPL
(257197) 2008 RG_{33}	2 September 2008	Spacewatch	Kitt Peak	5.231	0.033	7.2	5.061	5.402	13 km	–	catalog · MPC · JPL
(257198) 2008 RE_{54}	3 September 2008	Spacewatch	Kitt Peak	5.222	0.072	7.8	4.847	5.597	7.9 km	–	catalog · MPC · JPL
(257199) 2008 RW_{58}	3 September 2008	Spacewatch	Kitt Peak	5.150	0.074	3.5	4.771	5.530	11 km	–	catalog · MPC · JPL
(257200) 2008 RJ_{65}	4 September 2008	Spacewatch	Kitt Peak	5.157	0.087	8.5	4.707	5.606	11 km	–	catalog · MPC · JPL
(257201) 2008 RT_{66}	4 September 2008	Spacewatch	Kitt Peak	5.265	0.024	10.6	5.137	5.393	13 km	–	catalog · MPC · JPL
(257202) 2008 RU_{122}	5 September 2008	Spacewatch	Kitt Peak	5.278	0.063	4.3	4.948	5.609	13 km	–	catalog · MPC · JPL
(257203) 2008 RW_{122}	5 September 2008	Spacewatch	Kitt Peak	5.265	0.103	5.4	4.724	5.806	15 km	–	catalog · MPC · JPL
(257204) 2008 SQ_{220}	25 September 2008	Spacewatch	Kitt Peak	5.104	0.045	6.7	4.876	5.332	10 km	–	catalog · MPC · JPL
(257205) 2008 TT_{64}	2 October 2008	MLS	Mount Lemmon	5.266	0.118	3.6	4.642	5.890	10 km	–	catalog · MPC · JPL
(257206) 2008 UA	18 October 2008	G. Hug	Sandlot	5.267	0.061	23.0	4.947	5.588	15 km	–	catalog · MPC · JPL
(257375) 2009 QZ_{47}	28 August 2009	OAM	La Sagra	5.172	0.098	13.3	4.664	5.680	14 km	–	catalog · MPC · JPL
(257376) 2009 QW_{57}	17 August 2009	Spacewatch	Kitt Peak	5.181	0.053	5.2	4.908	5.455	10 km	–	catalog · MPC · JPL
(257380) 2009 SO_{10}	16 September 2009	Spacewatch	Kitt Peak	5.261	0.042	3.9	5.039	5.484	11 km	–	catalog · MPC · JPL
(257381) 2009 SK_{38}	16 September 2009	Spacewatch	Kitt Peak	5.205	0.092	2.6	4.728	5.681	8.5 km	–	catalog · MPC · JPL
(257383) 2009 SO_{52}	17 September 2009	Spacewatch	Kitt Peak	5.151	0.075	4.7	4.766	5.537	11 km	–	catalog · MPC · JPL
(257384) 2009 SO_{60}	17 September 2009	Spacewatch	Kitt Peak	5.191	0.054	7.0	4.909	5.473	10 km	–	catalog · MPC · JPL
(257385) 2009 ST_{121}	18 September 2009	Spacewatch	Kitt Peak	5.109	0.058	7.0	4.814	5.403	11 km	–	catalog · MPC · JPL
(257386) 2009 SN_{122}	18 September 2009	Spacewatch	Kitt Peak	5.259	0.166	8.8	4.385	6.133	13 km	–	catalog · MPC · JPL
(257387) 2009 SO_{137}	18 September 2009	Spacewatch	Kitt Peak	5.138	0.009	6.6	5.090	5.185	9.1 km	–	catalog · MPC · JPL
(257388) 2009 SD_{154}	20 September 2009	Spacewatch	Kitt Peak	5.171	0.070	4.2	4.809	5.534	8.9 km	–	catalog · MPC · JPL
(257389) 2009 SY_{155}	20 September 2009	Spacewatch	Kitt Peak	5.097	0.043	4.8	4.879	5.315	11 km	–	catalog · MPC · JPL
(257390) 2009 SM_{189}	22 September 2009	Spacewatch	Kitt Peak	5.118	0.103	6.3	4.591	5.646	9.0 km	–	catalog · MPC · JPL
(257392) 2009 ST_{203}	22 September 2009	Spacewatch	Kitt Peak	5.199	0.041	3.4	4.986	5.413	12 km	–	catalog · MPC · JPL
(257393) 2009 SZ_{211}	23 September 2009	Spacewatch	Kitt Peak	5.119	0.074	4.6	4.740	5.498	9.6 km	–	catalog · MPC · JPL
(257394) 2009 SV_{215}	24 September 2009	Spacewatch	Kitt Peak	5.101	0.065	3.1	4.770	5.431	9.0 km	–	catalog · MPC · JPL
(257395) 2009 SW_{216}	24 September 2009	Spacewatch	Kitt Peak	5.220	0.141	16.4	4.484	5.956	14 km	–	catalog · MPC · JPL
(257397) 2009 SL_{229}	23 September 2009	MLS	Mount Lemmon	5.234	0.083	4.7	4.798	5.669	12 km	–	catalog · MPC · JPL
(257398) 2009 SY_{246}	18 September 2009	Spacewatch	Kitt Peak	5.243	0.077	7.7	4.840	5.646	10 km	–	catalog · MPC · JPL
(257399) 2009 SX_{253}	25 September 2009	Spacewatch	Kitt Peak	5.320	0.084	16.8	4.872	5.768	16 km	–	catalog · MPC · JPL
(257400) 2009 SK_{264}	23 September 2009	MLS	Mount Lemmon	5.219	0.024	5.5	5.095	5.343	13 km	–	catalog · MPC · JPL
(257401) 2009 SM_{264}	23 September 2009	MLS	Mount Lemmon	5.190	0.171	27.7	4.301	6.079	14 km	–	catalog · MPC · JPL
(257402) 2009 SG_{297}	28 September 2009	CSS	Catalina	5.277	0.062	15.0	4.951	5.603	17 km	–	catalog · MPC · JPL
(257404) 2009 SF_{315}	19 September 2009	Spacewatch	Kitt Peak	5.209	0.067	7.0	4.860	5.559	13 km	–	catalog · MPC · JPL
(257405) 2009 SG_{330}	18 September 2009	CSS	Catalina	5.180	0.132	20.8	4.494	5.865	20 km	–	catalog · MPC · JPL
(257406) 2009 ST_{334}	26 September 2009	Spacewatch	Kitt Peak	5.129	0.063	4.8	4.809	5.450	13 km	–	catalog · MPC · JPL
(257407) 2009 SO_{356}	17 September 2009	Spacewatch	Kitt Peak	5.274	0.126	4.7	4.608	5.941	9.8 km	–	catalog · MPC · JPL
(257409) 2009 SB_{360}	27 September 2009	LINEAR	Socorro	5.171	0.127	7.2	4.516	5.826	11 km	–	catalog · MPC · JPL
(257411) 2009 TM_{18}	9 October 2009	CSS	Catalina	5.252	0.081	8.6	4.827	5.678	15 km	–	catalog · MPC · JPL
(257412) 2009 UY_{2}	16 October 2009	LINEAR	Socorro	5.180	0.151	13.1	4.399	5.962	15 km	–	catalog · MPC · JPL
(257413) 2009 UB_{61}	17 October 2009	MLS	Mount Lemmon	5.111	0.068	10.6	4.762	5.460	13 km	–	catalog · MPC · JPL
(257415) 2009 UP_{118}	23 October 2009	MLS	Mount Lemmon	5.227	0.044	1.8	4.995	5.459	8.5 km	–	catalog · MPC · JPL
(257416) 2009 UV_{147}	16 October 2009	MLS	Mount Lemmon	5.249	0.060	22.0	4.936	5.563	14 km	–	catalog · MPC · JPL
(257418) 2009 WD_{2}	16 November 2009	MLS	Mount Lemmon	5.217	0.070	3.3	4.854	5.580	11 km	–	catalog · MPC · JPL
(257486) 1995 SC_{24}	19 September 1995	Spacewatch	Kitt Peak	5.327	0.046	4.4	5.081	5.573	8.7 km	–	catalog · MPC · JPL
(257495) 1995 UE_{67}	18 October 1995	Spacewatch	Kitt Peak	5.255	0.016	5.9	5.170	5.340	9.9 km	–	catalog · MPC · JPL
(257505) 1996 RH_{33}	15 September 1996	Uppsala-DLR Trojan Survey	La Silla	5.203	0.059	7.2	4.897	5.508	13 km	–	catalog · MPC · JPL
(257561) 1998 TS_{25}	14 October 1998	Spacewatch	Kitt Peak	5.175	0.089	14.0	4.715	5.636	11 km	–	catalog · MPC · JPL
(257566) 1998 WP_{37}	21 November 1998	Spacewatch	Kitt Peak	5.215	0.074	9.8	4.826	5.603	12 km	–	catalog · MPC · JPL
(257775) 2000 CW_{129}	3 February 2000	Spacewatch	Kitt Peak	5.256	0.099	4.2	4.737	5.776	7.7 km	–	catalog · MPC · JPL
(257946) 2000 YJ_{15}	23 December 2000	Spacewatch	Kitt Peak	5.153	0.045	21.6	4.921	5.385	16 km	–	catalog · MPC · JPL
(257967) 2001 CZ_{10}	1 February 2001	LINEAR	Socorro	5.217	0.171	11.4	4.326	6.109	14 km	–	catalog · MPC · JPL
(257987) 2001 DY_{77}	22 February 2001	Spacewatch	Kitt Peak	5.253	0.079	7.7	4.839	5.667	10 km	–	catalog · MPC · JPL
(258538) 2002 BL_{31}	22 January 2002	NEAT	Palomar	5.156	0.163	6.7	4.313	5.998	12 km	–	catalog · MPC · JPL
(258567) 2002 CC_{94}	7 February 2002	LINEAR	Socorro	5.200	0.093	16.6	4.718	5.683	13 km	–	catalog · MPC · JPL
(258597) 2002 CJ_{204}	10 February 2002	LINEAR	Socorro	5.116	0.072	10.4	4.745	5.486	12 km	–	catalog · MPC · JPL
(258621) 2002 CF_{316}	14 February 2002	Spacewatch	Kitt Peak	5.325	0.031	6.8	5.162	5.488	11 km	–	catalog · MPC · JPL
(258624) 2002 DM_{13}	16 February 2002	NEAT	Palomar	5.149	0.027	8.2	5.011	5.286	12 km	–	catalog · MPC · JPL
(258627) 2002 DA_{15}	16 February 2002	NEAT	Palomar	5.127	0.078	19.1	4.730	5.525	12 km	–	catalog · MPC · JPL
(258628) 2002 DW_{15}	16 February 2002	NEAT	Palomar	5.133	0.045	19.4	4.903	5.364	13 km	–	catalog · MPC · JPL
(258631) 2002 EZ_{7}	11 March 2002	NEAT	Palomar	5.247	0.049	10.2	4.991	5.504	13 km	–	catalog · MPC · JPL
(258646) 2002 EK_{51}	12 March 2002	Spacewatch	Kitt Peak	5.238	0.078	14.2	4.829	5.648	9.9 km	–	catalog · MPC · JPL
(258656) 2002 ES_{76}	11 March 2002	Spacewatch	Kitt Peak	5.207	0.050	2.7	4.945	5.469	8.0 km	–	catalog · MPC · JPL
(258669) 2002 ET_{118}	10 March 2002	Spacewatch	Kitt Peak	5.167	0.101	14.0	4.647	5.687	11 km	–	catalog · MPC · JPL
(258670) 2002 ED_{120}	10 March 2002	NEAT	Haleakala	5.214	0.194	7.3	4.202	6.226	12 km	–	catalog · MPC · JPL
(258683) 2002 EX_{154}	6 March 2002	LINEAR	Socorro	5.239	0.064	16.1	4.906	5.572	16 km	–	catalog · MPC · JPL
(258684) 2002 EX_{157}	13 March 2002	NEAT	Palomar	5.173	0.072	8.1	4.803	5.544	9.9 km	–	catalog · MPC · JPL
(258685) 2002 EK_{160}	12 March 2002	NEAT	Palomar	5.256	0.076	2.8	4.859	5.653	8.6 km	–	catalog · MPC · JPL
(258686) 2002 EB_{163}	5 March 2002	LONEOS	Anderson Mesa	5.172	0.050	7.0	4.914	5.431	11 km	–	catalog · MPC · JPL
(258698) 2002 GO_{29}	7 April 2002	M. W. Buie	Cerro Tololo	5.141	0.077	5.3	4.746	5.536	8.9 km	–	catalog · MPC · JPL
(258762) 2002 HX_{17}	17 April 2002	Spacewatch	Kitt Peak	5.194	0.063	7.2	4.865	5.523	14 km	–	catalog · MPC · JPL
(259316) 2003 FJ_{38}	23 March 2003	Spacewatch	Kitt Peak	5.124	0.038	6.7	4.932	5.317	9.1 km	–	catalog · MPC · JPL
(259342) 2003 FB_{133}	24 March 2003	Spacewatch	Kitt Peak	5.209	0.068	12.6	4.855	5.563	13 km	–	catalog · MPC · JPL
(259343) 2003 FK_{133}	27 March 2003	Spacewatch	Kitt Peak	5.263	0.034	4.4	5.086	5.441	9.6 km	–	catalog · MPC · JPL
(259357) 2003 GH_{46}	8 April 2003	NEAT	Palomar	5.216	0.063	6.2	4.886	5.546	12 km	–	catalog · MPC · JPL
(259360) 2003 GA_{57}	5 April 2003	Spacewatch	Kitt Peak	5.241	0.074	7.0	4.851	5.630	12 km	–	catalog · MPC · JPL
(259361) 2003 GJ_{57}	11 April 2003	Spacewatch	Kitt Peak	5.315	0.038	11.5	5.113	5.518	17 km	–	catalog · MPC · JPL
(259370) 2003 HQ_{14}	26 April 2003	NEAT	Haleakala	5.178	0.120	19.4	4.558	5.798	13 km	–	catalog · MPC · JPL
(260701) 2005 JV_{120}	10 May 2005	Spacewatch	Kitt Peak	5.083	0.050	18.2	4.827	5.339	12 km	–	catalog · MPC · JPL
(260726) 2005 LQ_{2}	1 June 2005	Spacewatch	Kitt Peak	5.233	0.093	25.4	4.745	5.721	11 km	–	catalog · MPC · JPL
(262002) 2006 QE_{57}	23 August 2006	D. D. Balam	Mauna Kea	5.212	0.070	5.2	4.846	5.578	11 km	–	catalog · MPC · JPL
(263078) 2007 RU_{150}	8 September 2007	Siding Spring Survey	Siding Spring	5.288	0.132	13.6	4.590	5.986	14 km	–	catalog · MPC · JPL
(263080) 2007 RU_{226}	10 September 2007	Spacewatch	Kitt Peak	5.244	0.011	5.1	5.188	5.300	8.0 km	–	catalog · MPC · JPL
(263096) 2007 TO_{161}	11 October 2007	LINEAR	Socorro	5.287	0.137	5.5	4.565	6.009	11 km	–	catalog · MPC · JPL
(263122) 2007 VC_{6}	3 November 2007	MLS	Mount Lemmon	5.172	0.045	5.5	4.937	5.407	11 km	–	catalog · MPC · JPL
(263792) 2008 QX_{5}	25 August 2008	OAM	La Sagra	5.295	0.061	20.4	4.971	5.620	15 km	–	catalog · MPC · JPL
(263794) 2008 QQ_{37}	21 August 2008	Spacewatch	Kitt Peak	5.095	0.051	5.9	4.836	5.355	10 km	–	catalog · MPC · JPL
(263795) 2008 QP_{41}	21 August 2008	Spacewatch	Kitt Peak	5.231	0.102	1.6	4.697	5.764	8.7 km	–	catalog · MPC · JPL
(263796) 2008 QP_{42}	24 August 2008	Spacewatch	Kitt Peak	5.150	0.046	7.8	4.911	5.390	9.8 km	–	catalog · MPC · JPL
(263797) 2008 RK_{2}	2 September 2008	Spacewatch	Kitt Peak	5.206	0.093	6.8	4.721	5.692	10 km	–	catalog · MPC · JPL
(263799) 2008 RA_{10}	3 September 2008	Spacewatch	Kitt Peak	5.314	0.040	5.6	5.103	5.526	11 km	–	catalog · MPC · JPL
(263800) 2008 RQ_{16}	4 September 2008	Spacewatch	Kitt Peak	5.217	0.024	5.0	5.090	5.343	8.2 km	–	catalog · MPC · JPL
(263801) 2008 RU_{16}	4 September 2008	Spacewatch	Kitt Peak	5.152	0.041	6.3	4.941	5.363	10 km	–	catalog · MPC · JPL
(263802) 2008 RG_{19}	4 September 2008	Spacewatch	Kitt Peak	5.215	0.021	7.7	5.106	5.323	13 km	–	catalog · MPC · JPL
(263803) 2008 RK_{27}	8 September 2008	F. Kugel	Dauban	5.187	0.059	7.3	4.879	5.495	13 km	–	catalog · MPC · JPL
(263804) 2008 RD_{31}	2 September 2008	Spacewatch	Kitt Peak	5.294	0.093	6.4	4.804	5.785	13 km	–	catalog · MPC · JPL
(263805) 2008 RP_{31}	2 September 2008	Spacewatch	Kitt Peak	5.240	0.122	11.5	4.598	5.882	9.1 km	–	catalog · MPC · JPL
(263806) 2008 RW_{37}	25 April 2003	Spacewatch	Kitt Peak	5.257	0.068	1.1	4.898	5.616	11 km	–	catalog · MPC · JPL
(263807) 2008 RJ_{45}	2 September 2008	Spacewatch	Kitt Peak	5.273	0.032	3.8	5.105	5.441	8.7 km	–	catalog · MPC · JPL
(263808) 2008 RQ_{54}	3 September 2008	Spacewatch	Kitt Peak	5.164	0.034	5.3	4.990	5.338	8.6 km	–	catalog · MPC · JPL
(263809) 2008 RU_{55}	3 September 2008	Spacewatch	Kitt Peak	5.244	0.144	5.2	4.487	6.001	12 km	–	catalog · MPC · JPL
(263810) 2008 RD_{56}	3 September 2008	Spacewatch	Kitt Peak	5.159	0.127	4.9	4.502	5.815	8.7 km	–	catalog · MPC · JPL
(263811) 2008 RV_{99}	2 September 2008	Spacewatch	Kitt Peak	5.238	0.011	2.2	5.182	5.293	8.0 km	–	catalog · MPC · JPL
(263812) 2008 RW_{121}	3 September 2008	Spacewatch	Kitt Peak	5.140	0.065	9.7	4.804	5.477	7.9 km	–	catalog · MPC · JPL
(263814) 2008 RS_{122}	4 September 2008	Spacewatch	Kitt Peak	5.239	0.033	10.8	5.067	5.411	16 km	–	catalog · MPC · JPL
(263815) 2008 RH_{125}	7 September 2008	MLS	Mount Lemmon	5.159	0.053	6.4	4.884	5.434	9.8 km	–	catalog · MPC · JPL
(263816) 2008 RV_{125}	9 September 2008	MLS	Mount Lemmon	5.150	0.126	7.3	4.499	5.801	13 km	–	catalog · MPC · JPL
(263817) 2008 RJ_{126}	2 September 2008	Spacewatch	Kitt Peak	5.187	0.021	4.4	5.078	5.296	8.4 km	–	catalog · MPC · JPL
(263818) 2008 RX_{126}	5 September 2008	Spacewatch	Kitt Peak	5.139	0.109	11.0	4.581	5.697	11 km	–	catalog · MPC · JPL
(263819) 2008 RR_{128}	10 September 2008	Spacewatch	Kitt Peak	5.376	0.034	2.8	5.196	5.556	9.9 km	–	catalog · MPC · JPL
(263821) 2008 SX_{41}	20 September 2008	MLS	Mount Lemmon	5.262	0.091	2.0	4.782	5.742	9.0 km	–	catalog · MPC · JPL
(263822) 2008 SO_{49}	20 September 2008	MLS	Mount Lemmon	5.288	0.041	7.0	5.070	5.507	13 km	–	catalog · MPC · JPL
(263823) 2008 SD_{78}	23 September 2008	MLS	Mount Lemmon	5.353	0.062	2.8	5.023	5.682	9.5 km	–	catalog · MPC · JPL
(263825) 2008 SM_{172}	22 September 2008	MLS	Mount Lemmon	5.190	0.128	21.2	4.527	5.854	15 km	–	catalog · MPC · JPL
(263826) 2008 SA_{180}	24 September 2008	Spacewatch	Kitt Peak	5.220	0.080	5.1	4.804	5.637	11 km	–	catalog · MPC · JPL
(263827) 2008 SR_{190}	25 September 2008	MLS	Mount Lemmon	5.269	0.036	4.8	5.077	5.460	9.9 km	–	catalog · MPC · JPL
(263828) 2008 SG_{191}	25 September 2008	MLS	Mount Lemmon	5.237	0.063	7.2	4.909	5.565	13 km	–	catalog · MPC · JPL
(263829) 2008 SL_{222}	25 September 2008	MLS	Mount Lemmon	5.117	0.037	6.8	4.927	5.308	9.1 km	–	catalog · MPC · JPL
(263830) 2008 SK_{227}	28 September 2008	MLS	Mount Lemmon	5.256	0.091	8.8	4.776	5.736	10 km	–	catalog · MPC · JPL
(263831) 2008 SR_{254}	22 September 2008	CSS	Catalina	5.172	0.062	12.0	4.850	5.495	12 km	–	catalog · MPC · JPL
(263832) 2008 SU_{279}	24 September 2008	MLS	Mount Lemmon	5.291	0.082	1.5	4.858	5.723	8.7 km	–	catalog · MPC · JPL
(263833) 2008 TJ_{53}	2 October 2008	MLS	Mount Lemmon	5.192	0.080	6.7	4.778	5.605	11 km	–	catalog · MPC · JPL
(263834) 2008 TS_{54}	2 October 2008	Spacewatch	Kitt Peak	5.173	0.067	4.2	4.827	5.519	8.2 km	–	catalog · MPC · JPL
(263836) 2008 TU_{100}	6 October 2008	Spacewatch	Kitt Peak	5.261	0.056	0.6	4.969	5.553	10 km	–	catalog · MPC · JPL
(263837) 2008 TJ_{130}	8 October 2008	MLS	Mount Lemmon	5.192	0.097	4.2	4.691	5.694	8.2 km	–	catalog · MPC · JPL
(263840) 2008 WG_{61}	24 November 2008	Spacewatch	Kitt Peak	5.276	0.055	26.8	4.984	5.568	16 km	–	catalog · MPC · JPL
(264048) 2009 RX_{33}	14 September 2009	Spacewatch	Kitt Peak	5.182	0.044	8.2	4.954	5.410	15 km	–	catalog · MPC · JPL
(264050) 2009 RJ_{52}	15 September 2009	Spacewatch	Kitt Peak	5.229	0.112	18.0	4.642	5.815	11 km	–	catalog · MPC · JPL
(264051) 2009 RD_{54}	15 September 2009	Spacewatch	Kitt Peak	5.308	0.057	2.4	5.007	5.608	9.2 km	–	catalog · MPC · JPL
(264053) 2009 RY_{62}	12 September 2009	Spacewatch	Kitt Peak	5.054	0.056	4.6	4.770	5.338	8.0 km	–	catalog · MPC · JPL
(264055) 2009 SY_{5}	16 September 2009	Spacewatch	Kitt Peak	5.154	0.015	7.5	5.078	5.230	9.1 km	–	catalog · MPC · JPL
(264057) 2009 SA_{26}	16 September 2009	Spacewatch	Kitt Peak	5.168	0.107	1.4	4.613	5.722	7.1 km	–	catalog · MPC · JPL
(264059) 2009 SP_{39}	16 September 2009	Spacewatch	Kitt Peak	5.238	0.073	13.7	4.854	5.621	12 km	–	catalog · MPC · JPL
(264060) 2009 SO_{75}	17 September 2009	Spacewatch	Kitt Peak	5.298	0.057	6.0	4.998	5.598	11 km	–	catalog · MPC · JPL
(264065) 2009 SN_{136}	18 September 2009	Spacewatch	Kitt Peak	5.193	0.138	3.6	4.477	5.908	13 km	–	catalog · MPC · JPL
(264066) 2009 SR_{136}	18 September 2009	Spacewatch	Kitt Peak	5.250	0.128	2.5	4.580	5.921	11 km	–	catalog · MPC · JPL
(264068) 2009 SQ_{148}	19 September 2009	K. Černis; J. Zdanavičius	Moletai	5.170	0.119	8.2	4.556	5.784	11 km	–	catalog · MPC · JPL
(264071) 2009 SW_{159}	20 September 2009	Spacewatch	Kitt Peak	5.292	0.083	7.0	4.852	5.732	9.3 km	–	catalog · MPC · JPL
(264073) 2009 SA_{184}	21 September 2009	Spacewatch	Kitt Peak	5.238	0.114	5.3	4.639	5.836	9.0 km	–	catalog · MPC · JPL
(264074) 2009 SF_{185}	21 September 2009	Spacewatch	Kitt Peak	5.160	0.127	7.5	4.507	5.812	13 km	–	catalog · MPC · JPL
(264075) 2009 ST_{185}	21 September 2009	Spacewatch	Kitt Peak	5.322	0.017	4.3	5.233	5.411	12 km	–	catalog · MPC · JPL
(264076) 2009 SM_{198}	22 September 2009	Spacewatch	Kitt Peak	5.213	0.106	9.3	4.662	5.765	11 km	–	catalog · MPC · JPL
(264083) 2009 SM_{246}	17 September 2009	Spacewatch	Kitt Peak	5.166	0.114	7.4	4.576	5.756	6.5 km	–	catalog · MPC · JPL
(264084) 2009 SN_{246}	17 September 2009	Spacewatch	Kitt Peak	5.091	0.060	4.5	4.787	5.395	8.2 km	–	catalog · MPC · JPL
(264085) 2009 SF_{247}	18 September 2009	Spacewatch	Kitt Peak	5.185	0.116	4.4	4.585	5.784	7.6 km	–	catalog · MPC · JPL
(264086) 2009 SN_{249}	18 September 2009	Spacewatch	Kitt Peak	5.227	0.025	8.3	5.099	5.355	9.4 km	–	catalog · MPC · JPL
(264087) 2009 SL_{252}	21 September 2009	Spacewatch	Kitt Peak	5.172	0.096	4.8	4.675	5.669	10 km	–	catalog · MPC · JPL
(264089) 2009 SJ_{256}	21 September 2009	MLS	Mount Lemmon	5.140	0.092	7.6	4.665	5.615	11 km	–	catalog · MPC · JPL
(264094) 2009 SS_{287}	25 September 2009	Spacewatch	Kitt Peak	5.200	0.162	7.6	4.358	6.042	10 km	–	catalog · MPC · JPL
(264100) 2009 SO_{301}	16 September 2009	Spacewatch	Kitt Peak	5.209	0.157	8.3	4.393	6.024	8.7 km	–	catalog · MPC · JPL
(264101) 2009 SN_{302}	16 September 2009	Spacewatch	Kitt Peak	5.278	0.089	6.5	4.810	5.745	11 km	–	catalog · MPC · JPL
(264103) 2009 SF_{306}	17 September 2009	Spacewatch	Kitt Peak	5.188	0.130	8.0	4.516	5.860	8.7 km	–	catalog · MPC · JPL
(264109) 2009 SK_{339}	22 September 2009	OAM	La Sagra	5.261	0.105	6.7	4.707	5.814	13 km	–	catalog · MPC · JPL
(264110) 2009 SL_{339}	23 September 2009	MLS	Mount Lemmon	5.199	0.074	8.1	4.812	5.585	13 km	–	catalog · MPC · JPL
(264114) 2009 SK_{353}	26 September 2009	Spacewatch	Kitt Peak	5.190	0.206	5.1	4.120	6.260	8.7 km	–	catalog · MPC · JPL
(264116) 2009 SV_{355}	27 September 2009	Spacewatch	Kitt Peak	5.179	0.113	6.9	4.593	5.766	8.5 km	–	catalog · MPC · JPL
(264119) 2009 TT_{7}	13 October 2009	A. Lowe	Mayhill	5.301	0.064	26.1	4.964	5.637	14 km	–	catalog · MPC · JPL
(264120) 2009 TJ_{10}	14 October 2009	G. Muler	Nazaret	5.146	0.076	11.7	4.756	5.537	12 km	–	catalog · MPC · JPL
(264121) 2009 TD_{16}	2 October 2009	MLS	Mount Lemmon	5.211	0.131	7.2	4.527	5.895	11 km	–	catalog · MPC · JPL
(264123) 2009 TG_{33}	18 September 2009	CSS	Catalina	5.129	0.120	15.8	4.515	5.744	16 km	–	catalog · MPC · JPL
(264125) 2009 TE_{35}	14 October 2009	OAM	La Sagra	5.271	0.102	8.4	4.736	5.807	15 km	–	catalog · MPC · JPL
(264130) 2009 TK_{46}	1 October 2009	MLS	Mount Lemmon	5.181	0.035	26.2	4.998	5.364	17 km	–	catalog · MPC · JPL
(264132) 2009 UC_{5}	17 October 2009	OAM	La Sagra	5.199	0.124	7.0	4.554	5.845	11 km	–	catalog · MPC · JPL
(264133) 2009 UX_{15}	17 October 2009	J. Lacruz	La Canada	5.221	0.092	4.3	4.742	5.701	12 km	–	catalog · MPC · JPL
(264134) 2009 UZ_{21}	16 October 2009	CSS	Catalina	5.179	0.083	10.1	4.747	5.611	14 km	–	catalog · MPC · JPL
(264135) 2009 UX_{50}	22 October 2009	CSS	Catalina	5.244	0.154	10.0	4.439	6.049	13 km	–	catalog · MPC · JPL
(264138) 2009 UX_{77}	21 October 2009	MLS	Mount Lemmon	5.217	0.062	4.3	4.893	5.542	9.9 km	–	catalog · MPC · JPL
(264139) 2009 UP_{78}	21 October 2009	MLS	Mount Lemmon	5.148	0.052	7.6	4.882	5.414	14 km	–	catalog · MPC · JPL
(264141) 2009 UG_{87}	24 October 2009	CSS	Catalina	5.232	0.163	13.1	4.376	6.087	14 km	–	catalog · MPC · JPL
(264144) 2009 UJ_{91}	18 October 2009	OAM	La Sagra	5.358	0.036	7.7	5.164	5.551	14 km	–	catalog · MPC · JPL
(264145) 2009 UY_{97}	23 October 2009	MLS	Mount Lemmon	5.244	0.052	6.2	4.971	5.516	12 km	–	catalog · MPC · JPL
(264147) 2009 UF_{132}	16 October 2009	CSS	Catalina	5.309	0.061	9.0	4.986	5.631	10 km	–	catalog · MPC · JPL
264150 Dolops	10 November 2009	T. V. Kryachko	Zelenchukskaya Stn	5.163	0.107	4.3	4.610	5.716	9.5 km	–	catalog · MPC · JPL
(264153) 2009 VH_{80}	11 November 2009	CSS	Catalina	5.249	0.107	22.1	4.685	5.813	15 km	–	catalog · MPC · JPL
(264154) 2009 VA_{107}	8 November 2009	CSS	Catalina	5.287	0.038	17.8	5.088	5.486	18 km	–	catalog · MPC · JPL
(264155) 2009 VJ_{109}	9 November 2009	MLS	Mount Lemmon	5.132	0.019	19.4	5.032	5.231	17 km	–	catalog · MPC · JPL
(264156) 2009 WV_{5}	17 November 2009	D. Chestnov; A. Novichonok	Tzec Maun	5.289	0.068	8.4	4.930	5.647	15 km	–	catalog · MPC · JPL
(264157) 2009 YM	18 December 2009	MLS	Mount Lemmon	5.189	0.082	9.5	4.764	5.614	15 km	–	catalog · MPC · JPL
(264164) 2010 AV_{106}	12 January 2010	WISE	WISE	5.134	0.055	8.8	4.850	5.418	11 km	–	catalog · MPC · JPL
(264166) 2010 AA_{123}	7 December 1999	Spacewatch	Kitt Peak	5.282	0.088	6.3	4.819	5.746	16 km	–	catalog · MPC · JPL
(264387) 2000 DR_{89}	26 February 2000	Spacewatch	Kitt Peak	5.305	0.063	7.0	4.972	5.638	11 km	–	catalog · MPC · JPL
(264770) 2002 FS_{40}	20 March 2002	NEAT	Palomar	5.147	0.065	18.4	4.810	5.484	10 km	–	catalog · MPC · JPL
(265294) 2004 GO_{51}	13 April 2004	Spacewatch	Kitt Peak	5.058	0.042	6.3	4.845	5.272	11 km	–	catalog · MPC · JPL
(266644) 2008 SP_{143}	24 September 2008	MLS	Mount Lemmon	5.209	0.063	7.7	4.883	5.535	9.5 km	–	catalog · MPC · JPL
(266647) 2008 SH_{229}	28 September 2008	MLS	Mount Lemmon	5.178	0.096	6.2	4.683	5.673	11 km	–	catalog · MPC · JPL
(266648) 2008 SX_{260}	23 September 2008	MLS	Mount Lemmon	5.289	0.086	6.8	4.836	5.742	11 km	–	catalog · MPC · JPL
(266656) 2008 TG_{142}	9 October 2008	MLS	Mount Lemmon	5.241	0.013	6.8	5.171	5.311	11 km	–	catalog · MPC · JPL
(266662) 2008 UJ_{209}	23 October 2008	Spacewatch	Kitt Peak	5.152	0.104	1.3	4.618	5.687	6.4 km	–	catalog · MPC · JPL
(266736) 2009 SU_{3}	16 September 2009	Spacewatch	Kitt Peak	5.197	0.206	8.0	4.126	6.268	9.5 km	–	catalog · MPC · JPL
(266772) 2009 SW_{172}	13 February 2002	Sloan Digital Sky Survey	Apache Point	5.143	0.033	6.7	4.973	5.313	9.7 km	–	catalog · MPC · JPL
(266779) 2009 SO_{217}	13 March 2002	Spacewatch	Kitt Peak	5.212	0.140	6.9	4.483	5.941	11 km	–	catalog · MPC · JPL
(266791) 2009 SA_{271}	24 September 2009	Spacewatch	Kitt Peak	5.211	0.171	6.2	4.321	6.101	11 km	–	catalog · MPC · JPL
(266808) 2009 SN_{355}	12 October 1998	Spacewatch	Kitt Peak	5.125	0.095	6.9	4.639	5.611	9.5 km	–	catalog · MPC · JPL
(266813) 2009 SW_{363}	24 September 2009	MLS	Mount Lemmon	5.188	0.109	7.3	4.625	5.752	11 km	–	catalog · MPC · JPL
(266851) 2009 UK_{79}	27 February 2001	Spacewatch	Kitt Peak	5.171	0.047	3.6	4.930	5.413	9.9 km	–	catalog · MPC · JPL
(266869) 2009 UZ_{151}	18 October 2009	LINEAR	Socorro	5.251	0.134	18.6	4.549	5.953	13 km	–	catalog · MPC · JPL
(266898) 2009 WY_{105}	24 August 2008	Spacewatch	Kitt Peak	5.263	0.087	7.8	4.808	5.718	9.2 km	–	catalog · MPC · JPL
(266953) 2010 UC_{27}	25 October 1997	ODAS	Caussols	5.219	0.039	9.2	5.015	5.424	12 km	–	catalog · MPC · JPL
(266962) 2010 VG_{48}	15 September 2009	Spacewatch	Kitt Peak	5.186	0.083	5.2	4.757	5.615	10 km	–	catalog · MPC · JPL
(266965) 2010 VB_{58}	1 April 2003	Sloan Digital Sky Survey	Apache Point	5.179	0.131	19.3	4.502	5.856	15 km	–	catalog · MPC · JPL
(266979) 2010 WC_{16}	6 October 2008	MLS	Mount Lemmon	5.149	0.077	9.3	4.750	5.548	12 km	–	catalog · MPC · JPL
(266982) 2010 WL_{62}	21 July 2007	Q.-z. Ye	Lulin	5.188	0.088	6.8	4.729	5.646	12 km	–	catalog · MPC · JPL
(266988) 2010 XF_{35}	11 April 2003	Spacewatch	Kitt Peak	5.198	0.065	12.6	4.862	5.534	13 km	–	catalog · MPC · JPL
(266992) 2010 XR_{43}	16 November 1998	Spacewatch	Kitt Peak	5.117	0.131	19.3	4.445	5.789	13 km	–	catalog · MPC · JPL
(266995) 2010 XD_{67}	16 January 2000	Spacewatch	Kitt Peak	5.285	0.073	10.4	4.901	5.669	12 km	–	catalog · MPC · JPL
(266996) 2010 XQ_{78}	1 October 2009	MLS	Mount Lemmon	5.205	0.066	24.2	4.861	5.549	15 km	–	catalog · MPC · JPL
(267099) 1999 XG_{227}	15 December 1999	Spacewatch	Kitt Peak	5.252	0.071	6.3	4.878	5.626	15 km	–	catalog · MPC · JPL
(269327) 2008 SC_{278}	28 September 2008	MLS	Mount Lemmon	5.292	0.070	6.3	4.920	5.664	10 km	–	catalog · MPC · JPL
(269356) 2008 UF_{90}	26 October 2008	D. T. Durig	Cordell-Lorenz	5.241	0.128	4.9	4.572	5.909	11 km	–	catalog · MPC · JPL
(269420) 2009 SD_{107}	27 March 2003	Spacewatch	Kitt Peak	5.210	0.082	25.1	4.782	5.637	13 km	–	catalog · MPC · JPL
(269464) 2009 SK_{348}	24 September 2009	CSS	Catalina	5.282	0.154	17.4	4.468	6.095	13 km	–	catalog · MPC · JPL
(269549) 2009 WS_{5}	12 December 1999	Spacewatch	Kitt Peak	5.244	0.063	4.3	4.913	5.576	10 km	–	catalog · MPC · JPL
(269620) 2010 UJ_{58}	5 September 2008	Spacewatch	Kitt Peak	5.261	0.157	7.9	4.437	6.085	10 km	–	catalog · MPC · JPL
(269621) 2010 UX_{96}	10 March 2002	NEAT	Palomar	5.267	0.069	15.6	4.902	5.631	18 km	–	catalog · MPC · JPL
(269622) 2010 VF_{38}	9 October 2010	CSS	Catalina	5.214	0.162	17.3	4.369	6.058	15 km	–	catalog · MPC · JPL
(269623) 2010 VA_{173}	18 November 1998	M. W. Buie	Kitt Peak	5.283	0.057	3.6	4.983	5.583	10 km	–	catalog · MPC · JPL
(270504) 2002 EY_{161}	11 March 2002	NEAT	Palomar	5.152	0.026	9.5	5.019	5.285	9.3 km	–	catalog · MPC · JPL
(272124) 2005 MD_{11}	27 June 2005	Spacewatch	Kitt Peak	5.115	0.054	8.8	4.840	5.391	11 km	–	catalog · MPC · JPL
(274272) 2008 PC_{12}	10 August 2008	R. Ferrando	Pla D'Arguines	5.246	0.100	4.7	4.722	5.770	8.8 km	–	catalog · MPC · JPL
(274401) 2008 RW_{124}	6 September 2008	Spacewatch	Kitt Peak	5.320	0.054	4.6	5.035	5.605	13 km	–	catalog · MPC · JPL
(274404) 2008 RT_{128}	4 September 2008	Spacewatch	Kitt Peak	5.175	0.040	3.9	4.967	5.383	9.0 km	–	catalog · MPC · JPL
(274506) 2008 SV_{144}	25 September 2008	Spacewatch	Kitt Peak	5.178	0.053	1.2	4.906	5.450	7.1 km	–	catalog · MPC · JPL
(274562) 2008 SO_{278}	22 September 2008	MLS	Mount Lemmon	5.242	0.065	2.5	4.904	5.581	7.3 km	–	catalog · MPC · JPL
(274566) 2008 SR_{291}	24 September 2008	CSS	Catalina	5.254	0.083	9.3	4.818	5.690	12 km	–	catalog · MPC · JPL
(274634) 2008 TM_{88}	3 October 2008	Spacewatch	Kitt Peak	5.194	0.111	7.4	4.618	5.771	10 km	–	catalog · MPC · JPL
(274651) 2008 TF_{149}	9 October 2008	MLS	Mount Lemmon	5.198	0.046	8.4	4.957	5.438	11 km	–	catalog · MPC · JPL
(274666) 2008 TG_{174}	2 October 2008	Spacewatch	Kitt Peak	5.276	0.056	2.5	4.983	5.569	8.5 km	–	catalog · MPC · JPL
(274675) 2008 UZ_{7}	17 October 2008	Spacewatch	Kitt Peak	5.277	0.084	6.6	4.832	5.722	12 km	–	catalog · MPC · JPL
(274680) 2008 UL_{12}	17 October 2008	Spacewatch	Kitt Peak	5.137	0.117	5.4	4.536	5.738	7.4 km	–	catalog · MPC · JPL
(274773) 2008 UV_{348}	26 October 2008	Spacewatch	Kitt Peak	5.178	0.028	4.4	5.034	5.322	6.3 km	–	catalog · MPC · JPL
(274870) 2009 RH_{56}	15 September 2009	Spacewatch	Kitt Peak	5.206	0.044	9.1	4.978	5.433	14 km	–	catalog · MPC · JPL
(274905) 2009 SR_{110}	17 September 2009	Spacewatch	Kitt Peak	5.229	0.145	6.6	4.469	5.988	10 km	–	catalog · MPC · JPL
(274970) 2009 SK_{347}	28 September 2009	MLS	Mount Lemmon	5.186	0.142	9.2	4.451	5.921	11 km	–	catalog · MPC · JPL
(274976) 2009 SR_{355}	7 April 2003	Spacewatch	Kitt Peak	5.202	0.051	3.4	4.935	5.468	11 km	–	catalog · MPC · JPL
(274988) 2009 TG_{9}	13 October 2009	OAM	La Sagra	5.240	0.114	5.6	4.644	5.837	10 km	–	catalog · MPC · JPL
(275006) 2009 TM_{39}	15 October 2009	OAM	La Sagra	5.147	0.056	16.1	4.857	5.437	14 km	–	catalog · MPC · JPL
(275007) 2009 TW_{40}	13 October 2009	W. Bickel	Bergisch Gladbach	5.282	0.116	21.3	4.671	5.893	11 km	–	catalog · MPC · JPL
(275059) 2009 UD_{117}	22 October 2009	MLS	Mount Lemmon	5.242	0.046	12.6	5.003	5.481	11 km	–	catalog · MPC · JPL
(275116) 2009 VD_{57}	11 November 2009	OAM	La Sagra	5.194	0.026	8.4	5.061	5.327	14 km	–	catalog · MPC · JPL
(275137) 2009 VP_{72}	15 November 2009	LINEAR	Socorro	5.205	0.225	12.0	4.032	6.378	12 km	–	catalog · MPC · JPL
(275278) 2010 AV_{93}	7 April 2003	Spacewatch	Kitt Peak	5.232	0.078	10.4	4.824	5.641	16 km	–	catalog · MPC · JPL
(275279) 2010 AM_{107}	31 December 2000	NEAT	Haleakala	5.181	0.101	23.8	4.656	5.706	14 km	–	catalog · MPC · JPL
(275319) 2010 UZ_{24}	21 April 2004	Spacewatch	Kitt Peak	5.211	0.041	7.1	4.998	5.424	11 km	–	catalog · MPC · JPL
(275322) 2010 UP_{83}	16 October 1998	Spacewatch	Kitt Peak	5.093	0.067	3.1	4.750	5.436	9.5 km	–	catalog · MPC · JPL
(275324) 2010 UH_{99}	27 December 2000	LONEOS	Anderson Mesa	5.234	0.142	10.6	4.488	5.979	12 km	–	catalog · MPC · JPL
(275332) 2010 VV_{172}	15 November 1998	Spacewatch	Kitt Peak	5.127	0.049	5.9	4.874	5.380	10 km	–	catalog · MPC · JPL
(275333) 2010 VT_{192}	4 April 2003	Spacewatch	Kitt Peak	5.149	0.009	8.1	5.102	5.196	9.7 km	–	catalog · MPC · JPL
(275342) 2010 XV_{34}	18 September 2009	CSS	Catalina	5.264	0.106	23.8	4.707	5.820	15 km	–	catalog · MPC · JPL
(275371) 2011 AZ_{54}	13 September 2007	MLS	Mount Lemmon	5.172	0.060	3.2	4.864	5.480	5.6 km	–	catalog · MPC · JPL
(279204) 2009 UM_{8}	24 March 2003	Spacewatch	Kitt Peak	5.189	0.072	18.6	4.814	5.564	11 km	–	catalog · MPC · JPL
(279282) 2009 WF_{35}	7 September 2008	MLS	Mount Lemmon	5.286	0.023	6.6	5.163	5.408	9.9 km	–	catalog · MPC · JPL
(279487) 2010 XT_{38}	1 October 2009	MLS	Mount Lemmon	5.294	0.067	27.5	4.940	5.647	14 km	–	catalog · MPC · JPL
(279511) 2011 AQ_{72}	25 April 2003	Spacewatch	Kitt Peak	5.187	0.038	6.4	4.991	5.384	11 km	–	catalog · MPC · JPL
(280072) 2002 CL_{218}	10 February 2002	LINEAR	Socorro	5.199	0.092	30.2	4.719	5.680	14 km	–	catalog · MPC · JPL
(283176) 2009 QF_{59}	29 August 2009	OAM	La Sagra	5.188	0.209	7.1	4.104	6.271	14 km	–	catalog · MPC · JPL
(283236) 2010 TT_{162}	11 October 2010	B. Christophe	Saint-Sulpice	5.163	0.139	7.6	4.445	5.881	12 km	–	catalog · MPC · JPL
(285180) 1996 TH_{16}	4 October 1996	Spacewatch	Kitt Peak	5.234	0.032	21.7	5.064	5.403	11 km	–	catalog · MPC · JPL
(285228) 1997 SC_{12}	27 September 1997	Spacewatch	Kitt Peak	5.150	0.064	6.9	4.818	5.481	8.0 km	–	catalog · MPC · JPL
(285232) 1997 SS_{21}	29 September 1997	Spacewatch	Kitt Peak	5.245	0.058	2.2	4.939	5.550	8.6 km	–	catalog · MPC · JPL
(285236) 1997 TF_{12}	2 October 1997	Spacewatch	Kitt Peak	5.227	0.027	8.9	5.087	5.366	9.5 km	–	catalog · MPC · JPL
(286548) 2002 CP_{158}	7 February 2002	LINEAR	Socorro	5.110	0.037	9.1	4.923	5.297	13 km	–	catalog · MPC · JPL
(286571) 2002 CR_{207}	10 February 2002	LINEAR	Socorro	5.228	0.046	31.9	4.988	5.468	13 km	–	catalog · MPC · JPL
(286575) 2002 CF_{211}	10 February 2002	LINEAR	Socorro	5.129	0.028	20.4	4.985	5.272	11 km	–	catalog · MPC · JPL
(286617) 2002 DL_{20}	16 February 2002	NEAT	Palomar	5.171	0.068	7.6	4.821	5.521	8.5 km	–	catalog · MPC · JPL
(286631) 2002 EZ_{26}	10 March 2002	Spacewatch	Kitt Peak	5.191	0.101	2.7	4.668	5.714	9.7 km	–	catalog · MPC · JPL
(286684) 2002 EC_{158}	5 March 2002	Sloan Digital Sky Survey	Apache Point	5.174	0.069	3.9	4.816	5.532	8.5 km	–	catalog · MPC · JPL
(286685) 2002 EP_{160}	13 March 2002	NEAT	Palomar	5.144	0.075	6.0	4.759	5.529	10 km	–	catalog · MPC · JPL
(287574) 2003 FU_{32}	23 March 2003	Spacewatch	Kitt Peak	5.173	0.041	14.8	4.963	5.382	10 km	–	catalog · MPC · JPL
(287577) 2003 FE_{42}	31 March 2003	J. W. Young	Wrightwood	5.161	0.058	7.1	4.864	5.458	9.9 km	–	catalog · MPC · JPL
(287600) 2003 FH_{133}	26 March 2003	Spacewatch	Kitt Peak	5.124	0.090	10.8	4.662	5.587	9.8 km	–	catalog · MPC · JPL
(289734) 2005 JB_{29}	3 May 2005	Spacewatch	Kitt Peak	5.157	0.025	20.7	5.029	5.285	11 km	–	catalog · MPC · JPL
(289790) 2005 JS_{112}	9 May 2005	Spacewatch	Kitt Peak	5.169	0.093	27.3	4.689	5.649	13 km	–	catalog · MPC · JPL
(289838) 2005 LK_{26}	8 June 2005	Spacewatch	Kitt Peak	5.199	0.080	12.1	4.782	5.617	9.5 km	–	catalog · MPC · JPL
(289861) 2005 MQ_{11}	27 June 2005	Spacewatch	Kitt Peak	5.169	0.084	18.0	4.738	5.601	15 km	–	catalog · MPC · JPL
(292600) 2006 TU_{107}	11 October 2006	Sloan Digital Sky Survey	Apache Point	5.339	0.021	16.3	5.225	5.453	11 km	–	catalog · MPC · JPL
(294132) 2007 TQ_{274}	11 October 2007	Spacewatch	Kitt Peak	5.249	0.185	10.7	4.279	6.220	13 km	–	catalog · MPC · JPL
(294159) 2007 TS_{352}	14 October 2007	MLS	Mount Lemmon	5.258	0.003	18.4	5.243	5.274	14 km	–	catalog · MPC · JPL
(295449) 2008 OX_{22}	29 July 2008	Spacewatch	Kitt Peak	5.168	0.089	5.7	4.710	5.625	8.6 km	–	catalog · MPC · JPL
(295481) 2008 QH_{37}	21 August 2008	Spacewatch	Kitt Peak	5.245	0.121	14.1	4.608	5.881	12 km	–	catalog · MPC · JPL
(295488) 2008 RF_{14}	4 September 2008	Spacewatch	Kitt Peak	5.281	0.006	8.4	5.249	5.313	9.6 km	–	catalog · MPC · JPL
(295490) 2008 RD_{18}	4 September 2008	Spacewatch	Kitt Peak	5.259	0.086	7.9	4.809	5.710	10 km	–	catalog · MPC · JPL
(295491) 2008 RO_{20}	4 September 2008	Spacewatch	Kitt Peak	5.174	0.090	7.1	4.708	5.641	8.0 km	–	catalog · MPC · JPL
(295497) 2008 RE_{37}	2 September 2008	Spacewatch	Kitt Peak	5.239	0.118	7.0	4.621	5.857	11 km	–	catalog · MPC · JPL
(295500) 2008 RQ_{45}	2 September 2008	Spacewatch	Kitt Peak	5.177	0.079	7.5	4.769	5.584	7.9 km	–	catalog · MPC · JPL
(295502) 2008 RM_{51}	3 September 2008	Spacewatch	Kitt Peak	5.168	0.057	6.7	4.874	5.463	9.2 km	–	catalog · MPC · JPL
(295503) 2008 RE_{55}	3 September 2008	Spacewatch	Kitt Peak	5.267	0.093	6.8	4.775	5.759	8.9 km	–	catalog · MPC · JPL
(295504) 2008 RF_{57}	3 September 2008	Spacewatch	Kitt Peak	5.253	0.134	9.5	4.550	5.957	12 km	–	catalog · MPC · JPL
(295509) 2008 RQ_{73}	6 September 2008	CSS	Catalina	5.200	0.135	22.9	4.496	5.903	10 km	–	catalog · MPC · JPL
(295513) 2008 RR_{82}	4 September 2008	Spacewatch	Kitt Peak	5.130	0.060	7.3	4.821	5.439	7.8 km	–	catalog · MPC · JPL
(295520) 2008 RP_{112}	5 September 2008	Spacewatch	Kitt Peak	5.217	0.102	6.3	4.683	5.750	11 km	–	catalog · MPC · JPL
(295527) 2008 RV_{119}	4 September 2008	Spacewatch	Kitt Peak	5.185	0.097	30.3	4.685	5.686	12 km	–	catalog · MPC · JPL
(295528) 2008 RZ_{119}	6 September 2008	Spacewatch	Kitt Peak	5.140	0.013	5.4	5.074	5.206	8.6 km	–	catalog · MPC · JPL
(295529) 2008 RK_{121}	2 September 2008	Spacewatch	Kitt Peak	5.231	0.140	5.4	4.499	5.963	11 km	–	catalog · MPC · JPL
(295530) 2008 RC_{124}	6 September 2008	MLS	Mount Lemmon	5.280	0.073	3.6	4.894	5.665	8.4 km	–	catalog · MPC · JPL
(295531) 2008 RK_{125}	7 September 2008	MLS	Mount Lemmon	5.224	0.115	4.6	4.624	5.824	11 km	–	catalog · MPC · JPL
(295553) 2008 SO_{42}	20 September 2008	Spacewatch	Kitt Peak	5.267	0.059	4.6	4.957	5.578	8.5 km	–	catalog · MPC · JPL
(295558) 2008 SM_{55}	20 September 2008	MLS	Mount Lemmon	5.160	0.090	15.3	4.695	5.625	9.4 km	–	catalog · MPC · JPL
(295578) 2008 SM_{108}	22 September 2008	MLS	Mount Lemmon	5.193	0.065	3.0	4.853	5.532	10 km	–	catalog · MPC · JPL
(295591) 2008 SA_{136}	23 September 2008	MLS	Mount Lemmon	5.265	0.135	10.2	4.556	5.974	9.9 km	–	catalog · MPC · JPL
(295599) 2008 SY_{169}	21 September 2008	MLS	Mount Lemmon	5.223	0.083	8.2	4.788	5.658	8.5 km	–	catalog · MPC · JPL
(295618) 2008 SL_{213}	29 September 2008	MLS	Mount Lemmon	5.209	0.123	7.6	4.567	5.850	8.9 km	–	catalog · MPC · JPL
(295621) 2008 SO_{223}	25 September 2008	MLS	Mount Lemmon	5.253	0.039	4.8	5.045	5.460	8.5 km	–	catalog · MPC · JPL
(295625) 2008 SM_{232}	28 September 2008	MLS	Mount Lemmon	5.274	0.082	6.1	4.840	5.707	11 km	–	catalog · MPC · JPL
(295627) 2008 SF_{236}	29 September 2008	Spacewatch	Kitt Peak	5.300	0.046	10.0	5.057	5.543	12 km	–	catalog · MPC · JPL
(295630) 2008 SZ_{244}	29 September 2008	CSS	Catalina	5.231	0.071	7.6	4.858	5.605	11 km	–	catalog · MPC · JPL
(295634) 2008 SJ_{253}	21 September 2008	CSS	Catalina	5.190	0.107	23.8	4.636	5.743	14 km	–	catalog · MPC · JPL
(295644) 2008 SH_{278}	29 September 2008	MLS	Mount Lemmon	5.251	0.015	9.1	5.170	5.331	9.5 km	–	catalog · MPC · JPL
(295645) 2008 SP_{279}	24 September 2008	Spacewatch	Kitt Peak	5.322	0.037	0.8	5.127	5.518	8.9 km	–	catalog · MPC · JPL
(295653) 2008 TX_{4}	1 October 2008	OAM	La Sagra	5.282	0.077	6.8	4.872	5.691	11 km	–	catalog · MPC · JPL
(295675) 2008 TF_{91}	3 October 2008	OAM	La Sagra	5.314	0.059	5.2	5.003	5.625	10 km	–	catalog · MPC · JPL
(295676) 2008 TQ_{92}	4 October 2008	OAM	La Sagra	5.186	0.132	6.7	4.503	5.869	9.4 km	–	catalog · MPC · JPL
(295681) 2008 TD_{101}	6 October 2008	Spacewatch	Kitt Peak	5.277	0.067	10.9	4.924	5.630	8.8 km	–	catalog · MPC · JPL
(295686) 2008 TA_{119}	7 October 2008	Spacewatch	Kitt Peak	5.154	0.065	29.2	4.818	5.490	13 km	–	catalog · MPC · JPL
(295699) 2008 TC_{173}	1 October 2008	MLS	Mount Lemmon	5.251	0.045	2.5	5.017	5.485	8.5 km	–	catalog · MPC · JPL
(295701) 2008 TW_{174}	8 October 2008	Spacewatch	Kitt Peak	5.275	0.019	7.6	5.173	5.377	16 km	–	catalog · MPC · JPL
(295710) 2008 UM_{15}	18 October 2008	Spacewatch	Kitt Peak	5.234	0.079	3.7	4.821	5.647	8.5 km	–	catalog · MPC · JPL
(295746) 2008 UN_{100}	30 October 2008	D. T. Durig	Cordell-Lorenz	5.290	0.062	19.1	4.964	5.617	17 km	–	catalog · MPC · JPL
(295904) 2008 WP_{92}	25 November 2008	F. Kugel	Dauban	5.370	0.037	4.6	5.172	5.567	14 km	–	catalog · MPC · JPL
(296581) 2009 RU_{8}	12 September 2009	Spacewatch	Kitt Peak	5.137	0.041	7.2	4.927	5.348	10 km	–	catalog · MPC · JPL
(296588) 2009 RW_{30}	14 September 2009	Spacewatch	Kitt Peak	5.155	0.095	11.8	4.665	5.645	12 km	–	catalog · MPC · JPL
(296592) 2009 RA_{33}	14 September 2009	Spacewatch	Kitt Peak	5.217	0.170	7.8	4.331	6.102	10 km	–	catalog · MPC · JPL
(296603) 2009 RG_{62}	15 September 2009	Spacewatch	Kitt Peak	5.270	0.063	4.5	4.940	5.600	10 km	–	catalog · MPC · JPL
(296604) 2009 RT_{63}	15 September 2009	Spacewatch	Kitt Peak	5.151	0.093	7.5	4.671	5.632	10 km	–	catalog · MPC · JPL
(296628) 2009 SN_{58}	17 September 2009	Spacewatch	Kitt Peak	5.225	0.034	5.1	5.048	5.402	9.8 km	–	catalog · MPC · JPL
(296634) 2009 SX_{70}	17 September 2009	Spacewatch	Kitt Peak	5.275	0.085	8.8	4.827	5.723	13 km	–	catalog · MPC · JPL
(296648) 2009 SG_{122}	18 September 2009	Spacewatch	Kitt Peak	5.224	0.082	15.1	4.793	5.655	12 km	–	catalog · MPC · JPL
(296654) 2009 SW_{135}	18 September 2009	Spacewatch	Kitt Peak	5.309	0.053	8.7	5.028	5.591	7.7 km	–	catalog · MPC · JPL
(296664) 2009 SQ_{155}	20 September 2009	Spacewatch	Kitt Peak	5.201	0.202	2.8	4.152	6.249	9.5 km	–	catalog · MPC · JPL
(296665) 2009 SS_{155}	20 September 2009	Spacewatch	Kitt Peak	5.208	0.037	4.1	5.015	5.402	11 km	–	catalog · MPC · JPL
(296666) 2009 SQ_{156}	20 September 2009	Spacewatch	Kitt Peak	5.230	0.083	11.9	4.796	5.664	13 km	–	catalog · MPC · JPL
(296667) 2009 SM_{159}	20 September 2009	Spacewatch	Kitt Peak	5.168	0.030	12.0	5.014	5.321	11 km	–	catalog · MPC · JPL
(296671) 2009 SP_{170}	23 September 2009	MLS	Mount Lemmon	5.297	0.059	3.8	4.987	5.608	9.2 km	–	catalog · MPC · JPL
(296672) 2009 SU_{173}	18 September 2009	CSS	Catalina	5.215	0.053	16.4	4.940	5.490	16 km	–	catalog · MPC · JPL
(296674) 2009 SH_{188}	21 September 2009	Spacewatch	Kitt Peak	5.246	0.086	6.9	4.795	5.697	10 km	–	catalog · MPC · JPL
(296682) 2009 SM_{218}	21 August 2008	Spacewatch	Kitt Peak	5.170	0.049	10.2	4.919	5.421	12 km	–	catalog · MPC · JPL
(296683) 2009 SS_{227}	26 September 2009	Spacewatch	Kitt Peak	5.080	0.052	9.9	4.814	5.347	8.5 km	–	catalog · MPC · JPL
(296690) 2009 SM_{245}	16 September 2009	Spacewatch	Kitt Peak	5.199	0.129	6.0	4.528	5.869	10 km	–	catalog · MPC · JPL
(296691) 2009 SC_{246}	17 September 2009	Spacewatch	Kitt Peak	5.237	0.039	5.1	5.035	5.439	11 km	–	catalog · MPC · JPL
(296692) 2009 SV_{246}	18 September 2009	Spacewatch	Kitt Peak	5.073	0.064	2.3	4.747	5.399	7.5 km	–	catalog · MPC · JPL
(296693) 2009 SD_{247}	18 September 2009	Spacewatch	Kitt Peak	5.189	0.061	4.0	4.873	5.505	10 km	–	catalog · MPC · JPL
(296694) 2009 SV_{253}	25 September 2009	Spacewatch	Kitt Peak	5.180	0.110	5.5	4.607	5.752	8.7 km	–	catalog · MPC · JPL
(296707) 2009 SK_{313}	18 September 2009	Spacewatch	Kitt Peak	5.187	0.052	7.4	4.917	5.458	9.0 km	–	catalog · MPC · JPL
(296711) 2009 SF_{327}	21 January 2001	Spacewatch	Kitt Peak	5.281	0.052	14.7	5.004	5.558	12 km	–	catalog · MPC · JPL
(296720) 2009 SX_{349}	19 September 2009	Spacewatch	Kitt Peak	5.240	0.079	2.5	4.828	5.653	10 km	–	catalog · MPC · JPL
(296725) 2009 SW_{354}	28 September 2009	MLS	Mount Lemmon	5.186	0.099	7.4	4.674	5.699	11 km	–	catalog · MPC · JPL
(296726) 2009 SA_{356}	24 September 2009	Spacewatch	Kitt Peak	5.176	0.076	7.8	4.783	5.570	8.0 km	–	catalog · MPC · JPL
(296738) 2009 TO_{25}	14 October 2009	MLS	Mount Lemmon	5.208	0.052	24.3	4.935	5.480	13 km	–	catalog · MPC · JPL
(296745) 2009 TL_{46}	14 October 2009	OAM	La Sagra	5.245	0.071	10.2	4.872	5.618	13 km	–	catalog · MPC · JPL
(296757) 2009 US_{29}	18 October 2009	MLS	Mount Lemmon	5.250	0.042	17.7	5.030	5.470	14 km	–	catalog · MPC · JPL
(296763) 2009 UB_{51}	22 October 2009	CSS	Catalina	5.252	0.115	13.0	4.647	5.857	16 km	–	catalog · MPC · JPL
(296774) 2009 UG_{121}	24 October 2009	PMO NEO Survey Program	Purple Mountain	5.209	0.140	6.6	4.481	5.937	11 km	–	catalog · MPC · JPL
(296777) 2009 UX_{130}	27 October 2009	MLS	Mount Lemmon	5.207	0.123	13.6	4.568	5.846	13 km	–	catalog · MPC · JPL
(296782) 2009 UW_{148}	10 March 2003	Spacewatch	Kitt Peak	5.293	0.103	7.3	4.746	5.840	11 km	–	catalog · MPC · JPL
(296783) 2009 UT_{151}	16 October 2009	LINEAR	Socorro	5.197	0.037	9.2	5.003	5.391	14 km	–	catalog · MPC · JPL
(296786) 2009 UX_{153}	16 October 2009	MLS	Mount Lemmon	5.153	0.106	5.4	4.607	5.698	10 km	–	catalog · MPC · JPL
(296787) 2009 UR_{154}	16 October 2009	MLS	Mount Lemmon	5.276	0.048	7.6	5.022	5.531	13 km	–	catalog · MPC · JPL
(296793) 2009 VL_{25}	10 November 2009	F. Kugel	Dauban	5.262	0.028	17.3	5.113	5.410	18 km	–	catalog · MPC · JPL
(296809) 2009 VC_{79}	10 November 2009	CSS	Catalina	5.233	0.071	20.5	4.860	5.607	15 km	–	catalog · MPC · JPL
(296817) 2009 WF_{3}	7 April 2002	M. W. Buie	Cerro Tololo	5.274	0.051	3.4	5.006	5.542	11 km	–	catalog · MPC · JPL
(296853) 2009 WC_{185}	24 November 2009	Spacewatch	Kitt Peak	5.215	0.097	4.7	4.712	5.719	8.7 km	–	catalog · MPC · JPL
(296887) 2010 AB_{88}	13 April 2004	Spacewatch	Kitt Peak	5.202	0.026	28.9	5.065	5.340	15 km	–	catalog · MPC · JPL
(297111) 2010 PY_{65}	19 June 2007	Spacewatch	Kitt Peak	5.198	0.060	21.8	4.888	5.508	18 km	–	catalog · MPC · JPL
(297144) 2010 TM_{177}	12 October 2010	MLS	Mount Lemmon	5.130	0.058	8.9	4.833	5.427	12 km	–	catalog · MPC · JPL
(297147) 2010 UB_{6}	7 April 2003	Spacewatch	Kitt Peak	5.230	0.082	7.4	4.800	5.660	11 km	–	catalog · MPC · JPL
(297155) 2010 UV_{66}	20 December 2009	MLS	Mount Lemmon	5.166	0.130	7.9	4.497	5.835	12 km	–	catalog · MPC · JPL
(297158) 2010 UW_{99}	30 September 2009	MLS	Mount Lemmon	5.141	0.045	10.0	4.912	5.370	11 km	–	catalog · MPC · JPL
(297160) 2010 VG_{22}	21 June 2007	Spacewatch	Kitt Peak	5.261	0.025	2.8	5.129	5.394	8.3 km	–	catalog · MPC · JPL
(297163) 2010 VT_{36}	10 June 2005	Spacewatch	Kitt Peak	5.189	0.026	9.8	5.052	5.326	13 km	–	catalog · MPC · JPL
(297168) 2010 VW_{81}	21 November 2009	CSS	Catalina	5.222	0.062	16.9	4.899	5.544	12 km	–	catalog · MPC · JPL
(297174) 2010 VB_{136}	29 September 2009	MLS	Mount Lemmon	5.130	0.085	16.4	4.692	5.567	12 km	–	catalog · MPC · JPL
(297178) 2010 WF_{24}	16 January 2009	MLS	Mount Lemmon	5.172	0.111	27.9	4.601	5.744	12 km	–	catalog · MPC · JPL
(297182) 2010 WD_{49}	17 December 1998	Spacewatch	Kitt Peak	5.190	0.056	7.0	4.901	5.479	9.5 km	–	catalog · MPC · JPL
(297194) 2010 XX_{68}	26 July 2006	Siding Spring Survey	Siding Spring	5.253	0.032	17.6	5.087	5.420	14 km	–	catalog · MPC · JPL
(297195) 2010 XS_{76}	18 July 2007	MLS	Mount Lemmon	5.081	0.070	5.1	4.724	5.438	9.0 km	–	catalog · MPC · JPL
(297196) 2011 AY_{26}	27 October 2009	MLS	Mount Lemmon	5.145	0.055	12.2	4.863	5.427	9.6 km	–	catalog · MPC · JPL
(297287) 1997 SC_{33}	29 September 1997	Spacewatch	Kitt Peak	5.220	0.122	4.9	4.582	5.859	8.6 km	–	catalog · MPC · JPL

back to top
