= Meanings of minor-planet names: 257001–258000 =

As minor planet discoveries are confirmed, they are given a permanent number by the IAU's Minor Planet Center (MPC), and the discoverers can then submit names for them, following the IAU's naming conventions. The list below concerns those minor planets in the specified number-range that have received names, and explains the meanings of those names.

Official naming citations of newly named small Solar System bodies are approved and published in a bulletin by IAU's Working Group for Small Bodies Nomenclature (WGSBN). Before May 2021, citations were published in MPC's Minor Planet Circulars for many decades. Recent citations can also be found on the JPL Small-Body Database (SBDB). Until his death in 2016, German astronomer Lutz D. Schmadel compiled these citations into the Dictionary of Minor Planet Names (DMP) and regularly updated the collection.

Based on Paul Herget's The Names of the Minor Planets, Schmadel also researched the unclear origin of numerous asteroids, most of which had been named prior to World War II. This article incorporates text from this source, which is in the public domain: SBDB New namings may only be added to this list below after official publication as the preannouncement of names is condemned. The WGSBN publishes a comprehensive guideline for the naming rules of non-cometary small Solar System bodies.

== 257001–257100 ==
Named minor planet	Provisional	This minor planet was named for...	Ref · Catalog
257005 Arpadpal	2008 EW_{152}	Árpád Pál [ro] (1929–2006), a Romanian astronomer and professor at Babeș-Bolyai University in Cluj-Napoca.	JPL · 257005
257084 Joanalcover	2008 GX_{1}	Joan Alcover y Maspons (1854–1926), a Spanish Balearic poet, essayist and politician.	IAU257084

== 257101–257200 ==
back to top

Named minor planet	Provisional	This minor planet was named for...	Ref · Catalog
There are no named minor planets in this number range

== 257201–257300 ==
back to top

Named minor planet	Provisional	This minor planet was named for...	Ref · Catalog
257211 Kulizoli	2008 YY_{4}	Zoltán Kuli (born 1977), a Hungarian physicist, amateur astronomer and a discoverer of minor planets. He is the head of the technical department at Konkoly Observatory and was instrumental in installing a large CCD-camera on the Schmidt telescope at the Piszkéstető Station near Budapest.	IAU · 257211
257212 Rózsahegyi	2008 YB_{5}	Márton Rózsahegyi (born 1979), a Hungarian environmental researcher, science communicator and amateur astronomer, who was instrumental in installing a wide field-of-view camera on the Schmidt telescope at Piszkéstető Station.	IAU · 257212
257234 Güntherkurtze	2009 DD_{112}	Günther Kurtze (1921–1986), a physicist and professor of acoustics at Karlsruhe Institute of Technology in Germany	JPL · 257234
257248 Chouchiehlun	2009 FA_{19}	Jay Chou (born 1979) is one of the most famous musicians in Asia	JPL · 257248
257261 Ovechkin	2009 FS_{47}	Alexander Ovechkin (born 1985), a Russian ice-hockey winger who began his career with the Dynamo Moscow	JPL · 257261
257296 Jessicaamy	2009 HT_{57}	Jessica Amy Todd (born 1994), daughter of the Australian discoverer Michael Todd	JPL · 257296

== 257301–257400 ==
back to top

Named minor planet	Provisional	This minor planet was named for...	Ref · Catalog
257336 Noeliasanchez	2009 JA_{1}	Noelia Sanchez (born 1975) is an aeronautical engineer and co-founder of the DEIMOS space company, where she works as Head of the Space Situational Awareness Division for NEO and Space Debris.	JPL · 257336
257371 Miguelbello	2009 PM_{4}	Miguel Bello (born 1961), the founder and CEO of the DEIMOS space company.	JPL · 257371

== 257401–257500 ==
back to top

Named minor planet	Provisional	This minor planet was named for...	Ref · Catalog
257425 Davykirkpatrick	2010 JD_{24}	J. Davy Kirkpatrick, American astronomer at IPAC, Caltech	IAU · 257425
257430 Chrisgelino	2010 LC_{95}	Christopher Gelino, American astronomer working at IPAC at Caltech.	IAU · 257430
257437 Schuylervandyk	2010 NW_{68}	Schuyler Van Dyk, American astronomer working at IPAC at Caltech.	IAU · 257437
257438 Marcyharbut	2010 OH_{98}	Marcy Harbut, American scientific communicator working at IPAC at Caltech	IAU · 257438
257439 Peppeprosperini	2010 PL_{23}	Giuseppe Prosperini (1937–2005), an Italian amateur astronomer, observer of lunar and minor-planet occultations, and a co-founder of the Frasso Sabino Observatory	JPL · 257439

== 257501–257600 ==
back to top

Named minor planet	Provisional	This minor planet was named for...	Ref · Catalog
257515 Zapperudi	1997 CD_{6}	Rudolf Zappe (born 1928), a longtime member of the "Linzer Astronomische Gemeinschaft"	JPL · 257515
257533 Iquique	1998 CN_{4}	Iquique, a port city in northern Chile	JPL · 257533

== 257601–257700 ==
back to top

Named minor planet	Provisional	This minor planet was named for...	Ref · Catalog
There are no named minor planets in this number range

== 257701–257800 ==
back to top

Named minor planet	Provisional	This minor planet was named for...	Ref · Catalog
There are no named minor planets in this number range

== 257801–257900 ==
back to top

Named minor planet	Provisional	This minor planet was named for...	Ref · Catalog
There are no named minor planets in this number range

== 257901–258000 ==
back to top

Named minor planet	Provisional	This minor planet was named for...	Ref · Catalog
There are no named minor planets in this number range

back to top

Preceded by 256,001–257,000	Meanings of minor-planet names List of minor planets: 257,001–258,000	Succeeded by 258,001–259,000
