= List of minor planets: 257001–258000 =

The following is a partial list of minor planets, running from minor-planet number 257001 through 258000, inclusive. The primary data for this and other partial lists is based on JPL's "Small-Body Orbital Elements" and data available from the Minor Planet Center. Critical list information is also provided by the MPC, unless otherwise specified from Lowell Observatory. A detailed description of the table's columns and additional sources are given on the main page including a complete list of every page in this series, and a statistical break-up on the dynamical classification of minor planets.

Also see the summary list of all named bodies in numerical and alphabetical order, and the corresponding naming citations for the number range of this particular list. New namings may only be added to this list after official publication, as the preannouncement of names is condemned by the Working Group for Small Bodies Nomenclature of the International Astronomical Union.

Near-Earth obj.	MBA (inner)	MBA (outer)	Centaur
Mars-crosser	MBA (middle)	Jupiter trojan	Trans-Neptunian obj.
Unclassified

== 257001–257100 ==
Designation			Discovery			Properties		Ref
Permanent	Provisional	Named after	Date	Site	Discoverer(s)	Category	Diam.	Ref
257001	2008 EM_{150}	—	March 10, 2008	Kitt Peak	Spacewatch	·	3.2 km	MPC · JPL
257002	2008 EX_{150}	—	March 4, 2008	Mount Lemmon	Mount Lemmon Survey	·	2.1 km	MPC · JPL
257003	2008 ED_{151}	—	March 11, 2008	Catalina	CSS	EUN	2.0 km	MPC · JPL
257004	2008 ES_{151}	—	March 8, 2008	Mount Lemmon	Mount Lemmon Survey	KOR	1.4 km	MPC · JPL
257005 Arpadpal	2008 EW_{152}	Arpadpal	March 11, 2008	La Silla	EURONEAR	HOF	3.0 km	MPC · JPL
257006	2008 EC_{154}	—	March 15, 2008	Kitt Peak	Spacewatch	·	3.2 km	MPC · JPL
257007	2008 ED_{158}	—	March 4, 2008	Kitt Peak	Spacewatch	·	3.4 km	MPC · JPL
257008	2008 EX_{159}	—	March 1, 2008	Kitt Peak	Spacewatch	·	2.3 km	MPC · JPL
257009	2008 EH_{165}	—	March 2, 2008	Kitt Peak	Spacewatch	·	2.1 km	MPC · JPL
257010	2008 EO_{166}	—	March 6, 2008	Catalina	CSS	TIR ·	7.5 km	MPC · JPL
257011	2008 ES_{167}	—	March 9, 2008	Socorro	LINEAR	·	1.8 km	MPC · JPL
257012	2008 EA_{169}	—	March 14, 2008	Socorro	LINEAR	·	5.3 km	MPC · JPL
257013	2008 FW_{1}	—	March 25, 2008	Kitt Peak	Spacewatch	HOF	2.7 km	MPC · JPL
257014	2008 FQ_{6}	—	March 30, 2008	Piszkéstető	K. Sárneczky	T_{j} (2.99) · EUP	4.3 km	MPC · JPL
257015	2008 FJ_{8}	—	March 25, 2008	Kitt Peak	Spacewatch	·	3.4 km	MPC · JPL
257016	2008 FR_{11}	—	March 26, 2008	Mount Lemmon	Mount Lemmon Survey	·	1.3 km	MPC · JPL
257017	2008 FU_{12}	—	March 26, 2008	Mount Lemmon	Mount Lemmon Survey	·	1.1 km	MPC · JPL
257018	2008 FX_{12}	—	March 26, 2008	Mount Lemmon	Mount Lemmon Survey	·	1.8 km	MPC · JPL
257019	2008 FN_{14}	—	March 26, 2008	Mount Lemmon	Mount Lemmon Survey	EOS	2.4 km	MPC · JPL
257020	2008 FJ_{17}	—	March 27, 2008	Kitt Peak	Spacewatch	(5)	1.2 km	MPC · JPL
257021	2008 FK_{18}	—	March 27, 2008	Mount Lemmon	Mount Lemmon Survey	KOR	1.7 km	MPC · JPL
257022	2008 FT_{23}	—	March 27, 2008	Kitt Peak	Spacewatch	·	1.5 km	MPC · JPL
257023	2008 FQ_{24}	—	March 27, 2008	Kitt Peak	Spacewatch	WIT	1.5 km	MPC · JPL
257024	2008 FU_{24}	—	March 27, 2008	Kitt Peak	Spacewatch	·	2.2 km	MPC · JPL
257025	2008 FK_{25}	—	March 27, 2008	Kitt Peak	Spacewatch	MAS	930 m	MPC · JPL
257026	2008 FX_{25}	—	March 27, 2008	Mount Lemmon	Mount Lemmon Survey	·	2.6 km	MPC · JPL
257027	2008 FU_{32}	—	March 28, 2008	Mount Lemmon	Mount Lemmon Survey	·	1.1 km	MPC · JPL
257028	2008 FM_{35}	—	March 28, 2008	Mount Lemmon	Mount Lemmon Survey	·	3.0 km	MPC · JPL
257029	2008 FK_{38}	—	March 28, 2008	Kitt Peak	Spacewatch	·	1.5 km	MPC · JPL
257030	2008 FW_{38}	—	March 28, 2008	Kitt Peak	Spacewatch	·	1.7 km	MPC · JPL
257031	2008 FD_{39}	—	March 28, 2008	Kitt Peak	Spacewatch	PAD	3.5 km	MPC · JPL
257032	2008 FZ_{39}	—	March 28, 2008	Kitt Peak	Spacewatch	·	2.4 km	MPC · JPL
257033	2008 FL_{41}	—	March 28, 2008	Kitt Peak	Spacewatch	·	4.2 km	MPC · JPL
257034	2008 FN_{41}	—	March 28, 2008	Mount Lemmon	Mount Lemmon Survey	·	1.9 km	MPC · JPL
257035	2008 FO_{48}	—	March 28, 2008	Mount Lemmon	Mount Lemmon Survey	(12739)	2.1 km	MPC · JPL
257036	2008 FU_{48}	—	March 28, 2008	Mount Lemmon	Mount Lemmon Survey	·	1.7 km	MPC · JPL
257037	2008 FX_{50}	—	March 28, 2008	Mount Lemmon	Mount Lemmon Survey	·	1.8 km	MPC · JPL
257038	2008 FV_{51}	—	March 28, 2008	Mount Lemmon	Mount Lemmon Survey	·	3.3 km	MPC · JPL
257039	2008 FR_{54}	—	March 28, 2008	Mount Lemmon	Mount Lemmon Survey	KOR	1.7 km	MPC · JPL
257040	2008 FY_{55}	—	March 28, 2008	Mount Lemmon	Mount Lemmon Survey	AST	3.0 km	MPC · JPL
257041	2008 FN_{58}	—	March 28, 2008	Mount Lemmon	Mount Lemmon Survey	·	4.8 km	MPC · JPL
257042	2008 FD_{67}	—	March 28, 2008	Kitt Peak	Spacewatch	·	2.1 km	MPC · JPL
257043	2008 FH_{67}	—	March 28, 2008	Kitt Peak	Spacewatch	VER · fast	4.6 km	MPC · JPL
257044	2008 FL_{67}	—	March 28, 2008	Mount Lemmon	Mount Lemmon Survey	·	2.5 km	MPC · JPL
257045	2008 FN_{69}	—	March 28, 2008	Mount Lemmon	Mount Lemmon Survey	(5)	1.3 km	MPC · JPL
257046	2008 FT_{74}	—	March 31, 2008	Catalina	CSS	·	5.9 km	MPC · JPL
257047	2008 FN_{77}	—	March 27, 2008	Mount Lemmon	Mount Lemmon Survey	·	1.8 km	MPC · JPL
257048	2008 FA_{78}	—	March 27, 2008	Mount Lemmon	Mount Lemmon Survey	HOF	3.1 km	MPC · JPL
257049	2008 FL_{78}	—	March 27, 2008	Mount Lemmon	Mount Lemmon Survey	KOR	1.5 km	MPC · JPL
257050	2008 FX_{79}	—	March 27, 2008	Mount Lemmon	Mount Lemmon Survey	·	2.5 km	MPC · JPL
257051	2008 FE_{80}	—	March 27, 2008	Mount Lemmon	Mount Lemmon Survey	·	3.0 km	MPC · JPL
257052	2008 FH_{82}	—	March 27, 2008	Mount Lemmon	Mount Lemmon Survey	·	3.3 km	MPC · JPL
257053	2008 FT_{84}	—	March 28, 2008	Mount Lemmon	Mount Lemmon Survey	·	2.2 km	MPC · JPL
257054	2008 FN_{85}	—	March 28, 2008	Mount Lemmon	Mount Lemmon Survey	·	1.7 km	MPC · JPL
257055	2008 FF_{86}	—	March 28, 2008	Mount Lemmon	Mount Lemmon Survey	THM	3.2 km	MPC · JPL
257056	2008 FL_{88}	—	March 28, 2008	Mount Lemmon	Mount Lemmon Survey	·	2.1 km	MPC · JPL
257057	2008 FU_{88}	—	March 28, 2008	Kitt Peak	Spacewatch	·	3.1 km	MPC · JPL
257058	2008 FN_{89}	—	March 29, 2008	Kitt Peak	Spacewatch	·	2.3 km	MPC · JPL
257059	2008 FD_{94}	—	March 29, 2008	Kitt Peak	Spacewatch	·	2.7 km	MPC · JPL
257060	2008 FL_{94}	—	March 29, 2008	Kitt Peak	Spacewatch	PAD	1.9 km	MPC · JPL
257061	2008 FB_{96}	—	March 29, 2008	Catalina	CSS	·	3.4 km	MPC · JPL
257062	2008 FC_{99}	—	March 30, 2008	Kitt Peak	Spacewatch	VER	4.6 km	MPC · JPL
257063	2008 FZ_{99}	—	March 30, 2008	Kitt Peak	Spacewatch	EUN	1.9 km	MPC · JPL
257064	2008 FG_{102}	—	March 30, 2008	Kitt Peak	Spacewatch	·	2.2 km	MPC · JPL
257065	2008 FJ_{102}	—	March 30, 2008	Kitt Peak	Spacewatch	·	1.7 km	MPC · JPL
257066	2008 FU_{107}	—	March 31, 2008	Kitt Peak	Spacewatch	·	5.2 km	MPC · JPL
257067	2008 FV_{110}	—	March 31, 2008	Kitt Peak	Spacewatch	·	7.0 km	MPC · JPL
257068	2008 FE_{113}	—	March 31, 2008	Kitt Peak	Spacewatch	AST	2.7 km	MPC · JPL
257069	2008 FP_{113}	—	March 31, 2008	Kitt Peak	Spacewatch	KOR	1.5 km	MPC · JPL
257070	2008 FV_{113}	—	March 31, 2008	Kitt Peak	Spacewatch	·	1.5 km	MPC · JPL
257071	2008 FB_{114}	—	March 31, 2008	Kitt Peak	Spacewatch	THM	3.0 km	MPC · JPL
257072	2008 FU_{114}	—	March 31, 2008	Mount Lemmon	Mount Lemmon Survey	AGN	1.6 km	MPC · JPL
257073	2008 FU_{116}	—	March 31, 2008	Kitt Peak	Spacewatch	EOS	3.6 km	MPC · JPL
257074	2008 FN_{117}	—	March 31, 2008	Kitt Peak	Spacewatch	HYG	5.1 km	MPC · JPL
257075	2008 FJ_{118}	—	March 31, 2008	Mount Lemmon	Mount Lemmon Survey	HOF	3.6 km	MPC · JPL
257076	2008 FK_{128}	—	March 28, 2008	Kitt Peak	Spacewatch	·	2.6 km	MPC · JPL
257077	2008 FV_{130}	—	March 31, 2008	Kitt Peak	Spacewatch	HOF	3.5 km	MPC · JPL
257078	2008 FZ_{130}	—	March 28, 2008	Mount Lemmon	Mount Lemmon Survey	·	4.7 km	MPC · JPL
257079	2008 FU_{131}	—	March 28, 2008	Mount Lemmon	Mount Lemmon Survey	·	2.8 km	MPC · JPL
257080	2008 FR_{135}	—	March 31, 2008	Mount Lemmon	Mount Lemmon Survey	·	2.4 km	MPC · JPL
257081	2008 FV_{135}	—	March 31, 2008	Kitt Peak	Spacewatch	·	2.5 km	MPC · JPL
257082	2008 FH_{137}	—	March 30, 2008	Catalina	CSS	·	3.5 km	MPC · JPL
257083	2008 FS_{137}	—	March 31, 2008	Catalina	CSS	·	2.0 km	MPC · JPL
257084 Joanalcover	2008 GX_{1}	Joanalcover	April 5, 2008	Costitx	OAM	EOS	2.8 km	MPC · JPL
257085	2008 GD_{2}	—	April 6, 2008	Desert Moon	Stevens, B. L.	·	2.5 km	MPC · JPL
257086	2008 GT_{3}	—	April 7, 2008	Catalina	CSS	·	3.0 km	MPC · JPL
257087	2008 GL_{14}	—	April 3, 2008	Kitt Peak	Spacewatch	·	2.8 km	MPC · JPL
257088	2008 GH_{20}	—	April 7, 2008	Mayhill	Dillon, W. G.	·	4.3 km	MPC · JPL
257089	2008 GA_{23}	—	April 1, 2008	Mount Lemmon	Mount Lemmon Survey	·	2.7 km	MPC · JPL
257090	2008 GZ_{26}	—	April 3, 2008	Kitt Peak	Spacewatch	PAD	1.9 km	MPC · JPL
257091	2008 GT_{32}	—	April 3, 2008	Kitt Peak	Spacewatch	HYG	3.8 km	MPC · JPL
257092	2008 GW_{34}	—	April 3, 2008	Mount Lemmon	Mount Lemmon Survey	KOR	1.6 km	MPC · JPL
257093	2008 GK_{37}	—	April 3, 2008	Kitt Peak	Spacewatch	EOS	3.2 km	MPC · JPL
257094	2008 GV_{38}	—	April 3, 2008	Mount Lemmon	Mount Lemmon Survey	·	2.5 km	MPC · JPL
257095	2008 GO_{39}	—	April 4, 2008	Kitt Peak	Spacewatch	·	2.1 km	MPC · JPL
257096	2008 GJ_{41}	—	April 4, 2008	Kitt Peak	Spacewatch	·	4.8 km	MPC · JPL
257097	2008 GY_{42}	—	April 4, 2008	Mount Lemmon	Mount Lemmon Survey	·	3.9 km	MPC · JPL
257098	2008 GR_{45}	—	April 4, 2008	Mount Lemmon	Mount Lemmon Survey	VER	5.7 km	MPC · JPL
257099	2008 GO_{46}	—	April 4, 2008	Kitt Peak	Spacewatch	·	5.1 km	MPC · JPL
257100	2008 GQ_{46}	—	April 4, 2008	Kitt Peak	Spacewatch	·	3.0 km	MPC · JPL

== 257101–257200 ==
back to top

Designation			Discovery			Properties		Ref
Permanent	Provisional	Named after	Date	Site	Discoverer(s)	Category	Diam.	Ref
257101	2008 GV_{46}	—	April 4, 2008	Kitt Peak	Spacewatch	·	2.0 km	MPC · JPL
257102	2008 GR_{49}	—	April 5, 2008	Kitt Peak	Spacewatch	·	3.0 km	MPC · JPL
257103	2008 GE_{50}	—	April 5, 2008	Mount Lemmon	Mount Lemmon Survey	·	4.4 km	MPC · JPL
257104	2008 GG_{52}	—	April 5, 2008	Mount Lemmon	Mount Lemmon Survey	·	1.1 km	MPC · JPL
257105	2008 GE_{60}	—	April 5, 2008	Catalina	CSS	·	2.6 km	MPC · JPL
257106	2008 GU_{60}	—	April 5, 2008	Catalina	CSS	HOF	5.6 km	MPC · JPL
257107	2008 GJ_{64}	—	April 5, 2008	Kitt Peak	Spacewatch	·	1.5 km	MPC · JPL
257108	2008 GO_{64}	—	April 6, 2008	Kitt Peak	Spacewatch	EOS	2.3 km	MPC · JPL
257109	2008 GZ_{68}	—	April 6, 2008	Kitt Peak	Spacewatch	·	3.5 km	MPC · JPL
257110	2008 GV_{70}	—	April 7, 2008	Kitt Peak	Spacewatch	·	2.7 km	MPC · JPL
257111	2008 GE_{72}	—	April 7, 2008	Mount Lemmon	Mount Lemmon Survey	KOR	1.4 km	MPC · JPL
257112	2008 GT_{72}	—	April 7, 2008	Mount Lemmon	Mount Lemmon Survey	·	3.3 km	MPC · JPL
257113	2008 GE_{74}	—	April 7, 2008	Kitt Peak	Spacewatch	·	4.1 km	MPC · JPL
257114	2008 GN_{77}	—	April 7, 2008	Kitt Peak	Spacewatch	·	2.3 km	MPC · JPL
257115	2008 GE_{78}	—	April 7, 2008	Kitt Peak	Spacewatch	·	3.0 km	MPC · JPL
257116	2008 GH_{79}	—	April 7, 2008	Kitt Peak	Spacewatch	·	3.7 km	MPC · JPL
257117	2008 GO_{81}	—	April 7, 2008	Kitt Peak	Spacewatch	·	3.7 km	MPC · JPL
257118	2008 GS_{81}	—	April 8, 2008	Bergisch Gladbach	W. Bickel	·	4.9 km	MPC · JPL
257119	2008 GD_{86}	—	April 9, 2008	Kitt Peak	Spacewatch	·	2.0 km	MPC · JPL
257120	2008 GU_{87}	—	April 5, 2008	Mount Lemmon	Mount Lemmon Survey	·	2.2 km	MPC · JPL
257121	2008 GZ_{87}	—	April 5, 2008	Catalina	CSS	·	3.2 km	MPC · JPL
257122	2008 GC_{89}	—	April 6, 2008	Kitt Peak	Spacewatch	·	2.7 km	MPC · JPL
257123	2008 GT_{96}	—	April 8, 2008	Mount Lemmon	Mount Lemmon Survey	·	2.0 km	MPC · JPL
257124	2008 GG_{98}	—	April 8, 2008	Kitt Peak	Spacewatch	·	2.7 km	MPC · JPL
257125	2008 GX_{101}	—	April 10, 2008	Kitt Peak	Spacewatch	·	2.0 km	MPC · JPL
257126	2008 GH_{106}	—	April 11, 2008	Mount Lemmon	Mount Lemmon Survey	KOR	1.6 km	MPC · JPL
257127	2008 GZ_{116}	—	April 11, 2008	Kitt Peak	Spacewatch	·	3.3 km	MPC · JPL
257128	2008 GT_{117}	—	April 11, 2008	Kitt Peak	Spacewatch	·	3.1 km	MPC · JPL
257129	2008 GK_{118}	—	April 11, 2008	Mount Lemmon	Mount Lemmon Survey	·	3.4 km	MPC · JPL
257130	2008 GY_{120}	—	April 12, 2008	Catalina	CSS	·	2.6 km	MPC · JPL
257131	2008 GV_{121}	—	April 13, 2008	Kitt Peak	Spacewatch	HOF	3.1 km	MPC · JPL
257132	2008 GF_{123}	—	April 13, 2008	Kitt Peak	Spacewatch	·	1.5 km	MPC · JPL
257133	2008 GL_{130}	—	April 5, 2008	Kitt Peak	Spacewatch	·	2.7 km	MPC · JPL
257134	2008 GY_{132}	—	April 15, 2008	Kitt Peak	Spacewatch	·	2.7 km	MPC · JPL
257135	2008 GM_{136}	—	April 1, 2008	Kitt Peak	Spacewatch	HOF	3.1 km	MPC · JPL
257136	2008 GK_{142}	—	April 4, 2008	Catalina	CSS	GEF	1.8 km	MPC · JPL
257137	2008 GL_{144}	—	April 4, 2008	Socorro	LINEAR	·	4.6 km	MPC · JPL
257138	2008 HM	—	April 24, 2008	Kitt Peak	Spacewatch	·	2.0 km	MPC · JPL
257139	2008 HB_{3}	—	April 26, 2008	Bergisch Gladbach	W. Bickel	·	2.0 km	MPC · JPL
257140	2008 HJ_{4}	—	April 28, 2008	La Sagra	OAM	EOS	2.9 km	MPC · JPL
257141	2008 HW_{5}	—	April 24, 2008	Kitt Peak	Spacewatch	·	2.4 km	MPC · JPL
257142	2008 HA_{6}	—	April 24, 2008	Kitt Peak	Spacewatch	·	2.4 km	MPC · JPL
257143	2008 HP_{6}	—	April 24, 2008	Kitt Peak	Spacewatch	·	2.3 km	MPC · JPL
257144	2008 HP_{9}	—	April 24, 2008	Mount Lemmon	Mount Lemmon Survey	KOR	1.8 km	MPC · JPL
257145	2008 HW_{9}	—	April 24, 2008	Mount Lemmon	Mount Lemmon Survey	THM	2.8 km	MPC · JPL
257146	2008 HA_{13}	—	April 25, 2008	Kitt Peak	Spacewatch	EOS	2.5 km	MPC · JPL
257147	2008 HP_{13}	—	April 25, 2008	Kitt Peak	Spacewatch	·	2.7 km	MPC · JPL
257148	2008 HL_{15}	—	April 25, 2008	Kitt Peak	Spacewatch	CYB	4.4 km	MPC · JPL
257149	2008 HW_{16}	—	April 25, 2008	Kitt Peak	Spacewatch	·	3.7 km	MPC · JPL
257150	2008 HF_{17}	—	April 25, 2008	Kitt Peak	Spacewatch	·	4.7 km	MPC · JPL
257151	2008 HO_{18}	—	April 26, 2008	Mount Lemmon	Mount Lemmon Survey	·	2.7 km	MPC · JPL
257152	2008 HD_{21}	—	April 26, 2008	Kitt Peak	Spacewatch	·	2.7 km	MPC · JPL
257153	2008 HQ_{27}	—	April 27, 2008	Mount Lemmon	Mount Lemmon Survey	·	3.7 km	MPC · JPL
257154	2008 HM_{33}	—	April 25, 2008	Kitt Peak	Spacewatch	VER	4.1 km	MPC · JPL
257155	2008 HD_{37}	—	April 30, 2008	Mount Lemmon	Mount Lemmon Survey	THM	2.7 km	MPC · JPL
257156	2008 HO_{37}	—	April 29, 2008	Vicques	M. Ory	·	2.1 km	MPC · JPL
257157	2008 HL_{38}	—	April 25, 2008	Mount Lemmon	Mount Lemmon Survey	VER	4.9 km	MPC · JPL
257158	2008 HN_{39}	—	April 26, 2008	Mount Lemmon	Mount Lemmon Survey	·	1.7 km	MPC · JPL
257159	2008 HB_{43}	—	April 27, 2008	Mount Lemmon	Mount Lemmon Survey	·	2.9 km	MPC · JPL
257160	2008 HR_{43}	—	April 27, 2008	Mount Lemmon	Mount Lemmon Survey	·	2.2 km	MPC · JPL
257161	2008 HO_{54}	—	April 29, 2008	Kitt Peak	Spacewatch	EOS	2.6 km	MPC · JPL
257162	2008 HU_{56}	—	April 30, 2008	Kitt Peak	Spacewatch	·	1.9 km	MPC · JPL
257163	2008 HK_{58}	—	April 30, 2008	Mount Lemmon	Mount Lemmon Survey	·	1.9 km	MPC · JPL
257164	2008 HO_{58}	—	April 30, 2008	Mount Lemmon	Mount Lemmon Survey	(17392)	1.9 km	MPC · JPL
257165	2008 HR_{60}	—	April 29, 2008	Mount Lemmon	Mount Lemmon Survey	EOS	2.2 km	MPC · JPL
257166	2008 HQ_{66}	—	April 29, 2008	Catalina	CSS	HNS	1.8 km	MPC · JPL
257167	2008 HS_{66}	—	April 30, 2008	Catalina	CSS	·	2.0 km	MPC · JPL
257168	2008 HA_{69}	—	April 24, 2008	Mount Lemmon	Mount Lemmon Survey	·	1.8 km	MPC · JPL
257169	2008 HN_{69}	—	April 29, 2008	Mount Lemmon	Mount Lemmon Survey	·	3.7 km	MPC · JPL
257170	2008 JD_{1}	—	May 1, 2008	Mount Lemmon	Mount Lemmon Survey	·	3.7 km	MPC · JPL
257171	2008 JS_{1}	—	May 2, 2008	Mount Lemmon	Mount Lemmon Survey	·	1.9 km	MPC · JPL
257172	2008 JF_{2}	—	May 2, 2008	Kitt Peak	Spacewatch	EUN	1.6 km	MPC · JPL
257173	2008 JF_{13}	—	May 3, 2008	Kitt Peak	Spacewatch	L5	10 km	MPC · JPL
257174	2008 JX_{18}	—	May 6, 2008	Kitt Peak	Spacewatch	EUN	1.4 km	MPC · JPL
257175	2008 JO_{23}	—	May 7, 2008	Kitt Peak	Spacewatch	·	4.0 km	MPC · JPL
257176	2008 JZ_{27}	—	May 8, 2008	Kitt Peak	Spacewatch	·	2.3 km	MPC · JPL
257177	2008 JO_{28}	—	May 8, 2008	Kitt Peak	Spacewatch	·	4.9 km	MPC · JPL
257178	2008 JE_{29}	—	May 11, 2008	Catalina	CSS	·	4.4 km	MPC · JPL
257179	2008 JA_{30}	—	May 11, 2008	Kitt Peak	Spacewatch	·	5.3 km	MPC · JPL
257180	2008 JF_{31}	—	May 5, 2008	Mount Lemmon	Mount Lemmon Survey	·	2.5 km	MPC · JPL
257181	2008 JO_{32}	—	May 7, 2008	Kitt Peak	Spacewatch	EOS	2.5 km	MPC · JPL
257182	2008 JZ_{34}	—	May 7, 2008	Siding Spring	SSS	·	2.7 km	MPC · JPL
257183	2008 JP_{39}	—	May 7, 2008	Kitt Peak	Spacewatch	EOS	2.4 km	MPC · JPL
257184	2008 KJ	—	May 26, 2008	Kitt Peak	Spacewatch	·	2.1 km	MPC · JPL
257185	2008 KE_{1}	—	May 26, 2008	Kitt Peak	Spacewatch	·	3.1 km	MPC · JPL
257186	2008 KZ_{7}	—	May 27, 2008	Kitt Peak	Spacewatch	·	4.1 km	MPC · JPL
257187	2008 KD_{10}	—	May 27, 2008	Mount Lemmon	Mount Lemmon Survey	·	5.3 km	MPC · JPL
257188	2008 KE_{11}	—	May 29, 2008	Kitt Peak	Spacewatch	·	4.0 km	MPC · JPL
257189	2008 KU_{11}	—	May 28, 2008	Calvin-Rehoboth	Calvin College	·	3.8 km	MPC · JPL
257190	2008 KD_{35}	—	May 27, 2008	Kitt Peak	Spacewatch	·	2.8 km	MPC · JPL
257191	2008 LE_{7}	—	June 3, 2008	Kitt Peak	Spacewatch	·	3.6 km	MPC · JPL
257192	2008 MG	—	June 22, 2008	Kitt Peak	Spacewatch	·	5.0 km	MPC · JPL
257193	2008 PK_{19}	—	August 7, 2008	Kitt Peak	Spacewatch	L4	10 km	MPC · JPL
257194	2008 PZ_{21}	—	August 3, 2008	Socorro	LINEAR	ARM	5.4 km	MPC · JPL
257195	2008 QY_{41}	—	August 29, 2008	Parc National des Cévennes	C. Demeautis, J.-M. Lopez	L4	10 km	MPC · JPL
257196	2008 RE_{3}	—	September 2, 2008	Kitt Peak	Spacewatch	L4	8.7 km	MPC · JPL
257197	2008 RG_{33}	—	September 2, 2008	Kitt Peak	Spacewatch	L4	10 km	MPC · JPL
257198	2008 RE_{54}	—	September 3, 2008	Kitt Peak	Spacewatch	L4	8.2 km	MPC · JPL
257199	2008 RW_{58}	—	September 3, 2008	Kitt Peak	Spacewatch	L4	10 km	MPC · JPL
257200	2008 RJ_{65}	—	September 4, 2008	Kitt Peak	Spacewatch	L4	10 km	MPC · JPL

== 257201–257300 ==
back to top

Designation			Discovery			Properties		Ref
Permanent	Provisional	Named after	Date	Site	Discoverer(s)	Category	Diam.	Ref
257201	2008 RT_{66}	—	September 4, 2008	Kitt Peak	Spacewatch	L4	13 km	MPC · JPL
257202	2008 RU_{122}	—	September 5, 2008	Kitt Peak	Spacewatch	L4	10 km	MPC · JPL
257203	2008 RW_{122}	—	September 5, 2008	Kitt Peak	Spacewatch	L4	15 km	MPC · JPL
257204	2008 SQ_{220}	—	September 25, 2008	Kitt Peak	Spacewatch	L4	10 km	MPC · JPL
257205	2008 TT_{64}	—	October 2, 2008	Mount Lemmon	Mount Lemmon Survey	L4	10 km	MPC · JPL
257206	2008 UA	—	October 18, 2008	Sandlot	G. Hug	L4	15 km	MPC · JPL
257207	2008 UL_{123}	—	October 22, 2008	Kitt Peak	Spacewatch	·	1.2 km	MPC · JPL
257208	2008 WB_{38}	—	November 17, 2008	Kitt Peak	Spacewatch	·	3.5 km	MPC · JPL
257209	2008 WW_{91}	—	November 26, 2008	La Sagra	OAM	H	720 m	MPC · JPL
257210	2008 XO_{22}	—	December 2, 2008	Mount Lemmon	Mount Lemmon Survey	·	3.9 km	MPC · JPL
257211 Kulizoli	2008 YY_{4}	Kulizoli	December 21, 2008	Piszkéstető	K. Sárneczky	·	3.1 km	MPC · JPL
257212 Rózsahegyi	2008 YB_{5}	Rózsahegyi	December 22, 2008	Piszkéstető	K. Sárneczky	·	1.6 km	MPC · JPL
257213	2008 YM_{79}	—	December 30, 2008	Mount Lemmon	Mount Lemmon Survey	·	1.4 km	MPC · JPL
257214	2009 AF_{14}	—	January 2, 2009	Mount Lemmon	Mount Lemmon Survey	EOS	3.4 km	MPC · JPL
257215	2009 AT_{22}	—	January 3, 2009	Kitt Peak	Spacewatch	·	1.7 km	MPC · JPL
257216	2009 AY_{43}	—	January 2, 2009	Kitt Peak	Spacewatch	·	2.1 km	MPC · JPL
257217	2009 AL_{48}	—	January 2, 2009	Catalina	CSS	·	4.2 km	MPC · JPL
257218	2009 BK_{112}	—	January 30, 2009	Mount Lemmon	Mount Lemmon Survey	NYS	1.4 km	MPC · JPL
257219	2009 BM_{178}	—	January 20, 2009	Mount Lemmon	Mount Lemmon Survey	·	1.1 km	MPC · JPL
257220	2009 BB_{179}	—	January 30, 2009	Mount Lemmon	Mount Lemmon Survey	·	800 m	MPC · JPL
257221	2009 CX_{26}	—	February 1, 2009	Kitt Peak	Spacewatch	·	630 m	MPC · JPL
257222	2009 CG_{58}	—	February 3, 2009	Kitt Peak	Spacewatch	·	750 m	MPC · JPL
257223	2009 CB_{62}	—	February 3, 2009	Mount Lemmon	Mount Lemmon Survey	·	1.4 km	MPC · JPL
257224	2009 DZ_{6}	—	February 18, 2009	Siding Spring	SSS	PHO	1.7 km	MPC · JPL
257225	2009 DY_{11}	—	February 18, 2009	Socorro	LINEAR	T_{j} (2.99)	4.9 km	MPC · JPL
257226	2009 DW_{31}	—	February 20, 2009	Kitt Peak	Spacewatch	·	2.0 km	MPC · JPL
257227	2009 DU_{35}	—	February 20, 2009	Kitt Peak	Spacewatch	·	6.2 km	MPC · JPL
257228	2009 DP_{50}	—	February 19, 2009	Kitt Peak	Spacewatch	·	1.5 km	MPC · JPL
257229	2009 DS_{61}	—	February 22, 2009	Kitt Peak	Spacewatch	·	3.2 km	MPC · JPL
257230	2009 DR_{64}	—	February 24, 2009	Kitt Peak	Spacewatch	MAS	1.0 km	MPC · JPL
257231	2009 DW_{71}	—	February 20, 2009	Kitt Peak	Spacewatch	·	2.4 km	MPC · JPL
257232	2009 DJ_{75}	—	February 19, 2009	Catalina	CSS	·	1.8 km	MPC · JPL
257233	2009 DV_{91}	—	February 27, 2009	Kitt Peak	Spacewatch	·	1.9 km	MPC · JPL
257234 Güntherkurtze	2009 DD_{112}	Güntherkurtze	February 26, 2009	Calar Alto	F. Hormuth	·	1.1 km	MPC · JPL
257235	2009 DO_{124}	—	February 19, 2009	Kitt Peak	Spacewatch	MAS	880 m	MPC · JPL
257236	2009 DF_{125}	—	February 19, 2009	Kitt Peak	Spacewatch	·	1.5 km	MPC · JPL
257237	2009 DU_{125}	—	February 19, 2009	Kitt Peak	Spacewatch	·	1.2 km	MPC · JPL
257238	2009 DN_{130}	—	February 26, 2009	Kitt Peak	Spacewatch	MAS	820 m	MPC · JPL
257239	2009 ET_{4}	—	March 15, 2009	La Sagra	OAM	·	5.4 km	MPC · JPL
257240	2009 EJ_{12}	—	March 1, 2009	Kitt Peak	Spacewatch	·	2.4 km	MPC · JPL
257241	2009 EM_{13}	—	March 15, 2009	Kitt Peak	Spacewatch	KOR	1.5 km	MPC · JPL
257242	2009 ET_{14}	—	March 15, 2009	Kitt Peak	Spacewatch	·	760 m	MPC · JPL
257243	2009 EU_{21}	—	March 14, 2009	La Sagra	OAM	H	630 m	MPC · JPL
257244	2009 EP_{26}	—	March 15, 2009	Kitt Peak	Spacewatch	·	1.2 km	MPC · JPL
257245	2009 FW_{3}	—	March 18, 2009	Dauban	Kugel, F.	·	1.1 km	MPC · JPL
257246	2009 FA_{4}	—	March 18, 2009	La Sagra	OAM	·	1.5 km	MPC · JPL
257247	2009 FS_{18}	—	March 20, 2009	La Sagra	OAM	·	2.1 km	MPC · JPL
257248 Chouchiehlun	2009 FA_{19}	Chouchiehlun	March 20, 2009	Lulin	Tsai, Y.-S., T. Chen	MAS	940 m	MPC · JPL
257249	2009 FL_{20}	—	March 17, 2009	Bergisch Gladbach	W. Bickel	·	1 km	MPC · JPL
257250	2009 FF_{22}	—	March 18, 2009	Kitt Peak	Spacewatch	·	1.1 km	MPC · JPL
257251	2009 FG_{25}	—	March 22, 2009	Vicques	M. Ory	·	2.5 km	MPC · JPL
257252	2009 FK_{26}	—	March 17, 2009	Kitt Peak	Spacewatch	·	920 m	MPC · JPL
257253	2009 FH_{30}	—	March 27, 2009	La Sagra	OAM	H	890 m	MPC · JPL
257254	2009 FC_{31}	—	March 24, 2009	Socorro	LINEAR	·	2.0 km	MPC · JPL
257255	2009 FB_{39}	—	March 21, 2009	Kitt Peak	Spacewatch	·	860 m	MPC · JPL
257256	2009 FA_{43}	—	March 29, 2009	Socorro	LINEAR	·	1.6 km	MPC · JPL
257257	2009 FB_{43}	—	March 29, 2009	Socorro	LINEAR	·	2.1 km	MPC · JPL
257258	2009 FP_{45}	—	March 19, 2009	Mount Lemmon	Mount Lemmon Survey	(2076)	930 m	MPC · JPL
257259	2009 FU_{45}	—	March 27, 2009	La Sagra	OAM	·	1.0 km	MPC · JPL
257260	2009 FK_{46}	—	March 27, 2009	Kitt Peak	Spacewatch	·	1.1 km	MPC · JPL
257261 Ovechkin	2009 FS_{47}	Ovechkin	March 31, 2009	Tzec Maun	L. Elenin	·	1.9 km	MPC · JPL
257262	2009 FC_{49}	—	March 26, 2009	Mount Lemmon	Mount Lemmon Survey	·	1.0 km	MPC · JPL
257263	2009 FF_{58}	—	March 21, 2009	Kitt Peak	Spacewatch	·	1.5 km	MPC · JPL
257264	2009 FG_{58}	—	March 21, 2009	Kitt Peak	Spacewatch	·	940 m	MPC · JPL
257265	2009 FY_{58}	—	March 21, 2009	Mount Lemmon	Mount Lemmon Survey	·	860 m	MPC · JPL
257266	2009 FZ_{74}	—	March 28, 2009	Siding Spring	SSS	·	2.4 km	MPC · JPL
257267	2009 FY_{75}	—	March 24, 2009	Kitt Peak	Spacewatch	·	1.4 km	MPC · JPL
257268	2009 FC_{76}	—	March 24, 2009	Kitt Peak	Spacewatch	GEF	1.6 km	MPC · JPL
257269	2009 FP_{76}	—	March 29, 2009	Kitt Peak	Spacewatch	·	740 m	MPC · JPL
257270	2009 GW_{2}	—	April 15, 2009	Siding Spring	SSS	H	850 m	MPC · JPL
257271	2009 GV_{5}	—	April 2, 2009	Kitt Peak	Spacewatch	·	1.2 km	MPC · JPL
257272	2009 HH	—	April 17, 2009	Cordell-Lorenz	D. T. Durig	·	2.2 km	MPC · JPL
257273	2009 HC_{1}	—	April 16, 2009	Catalina	CSS	·	1.0 km	MPC · JPL
257274	2009 HF_{1}	—	April 16, 2009	Catalina	CSS	·	1.6 km	MPC · JPL
257275	2009 HA_{2}	—	April 17, 2009	Kitt Peak	Spacewatch	·	1.1 km	MPC · JPL
257276	2009 HG_{2}	—	April 17, 2009	Catalina	CSS	·	940 m	MPC · JPL
257277	2009 HX_{4}	—	April 17, 2009	Kitt Peak	Spacewatch	·	1.1 km	MPC · JPL
257278	2009 HJ_{5}	—	April 17, 2009	Kitt Peak	Spacewatch	·	1.5 km	MPC · JPL
257279	2009 HY_{7}	—	April 17, 2009	Kitt Peak	Spacewatch	·	1.1 km	MPC · JPL
257280	2009 HE_{8}	—	April 17, 2009	Kitt Peak	Spacewatch	·	1.1 km	MPC · JPL
257281	2009 HN_{19}	—	April 19, 2009	Catalina	CSS	·	2.3 km	MPC · JPL
257282	2009 HT_{19}	—	April 16, 2009	Catalina	CSS	·	1.3 km	MPC · JPL
257283	2009 HH_{20}	—	April 18, 2009	Kitt Peak	Spacewatch	·	2.4 km	MPC · JPL
257284	2009 HK_{20}	—	April 18, 2009	Kitt Peak	Spacewatch	·	900 m	MPC · JPL
257285	2009 HV_{21}	—	April 16, 2009	Catalina	CSS	·	1.6 km	MPC · JPL
257286	2009 HU_{27}	—	April 18, 2009	Kitt Peak	Spacewatch	·	860 m	MPC · JPL
257287	2009 HT_{28}	—	April 18, 2009	Catalina	CSS	·	850 m	MPC · JPL
257288	2009 HJ_{32}	—	April 19, 2009	Kitt Peak	Spacewatch	(5)	1.5 km	MPC · JPL
257289	2009 HJ_{37}	—	April 17, 2009	Catalina	CSS	EUN	1.7 km	MPC · JPL
257290	2009 HS_{41}	—	April 20, 2009	Kitt Peak	Spacewatch	V	850 m	MPC · JPL
257291	2009 HQ_{42}	—	April 20, 2009	Kitt Peak	Spacewatch	EUP	4.9 km	MPC · JPL
257292	2009 HK_{45}	—	April 21, 2009	La Sagra	OAM	·	3.0 km	MPC · JPL
257293	2009 HC_{50}	—	April 21, 2009	Kitt Peak	Spacewatch	·	1.4 km	MPC · JPL
257294	2009 HQ_{53}	—	April 20, 2009	Kitt Peak	Spacewatch	·	1.4 km	MPC · JPL
257295	2009 HN_{55}	—	April 21, 2009	Mount Lemmon	Mount Lemmon Survey	NYS	1.2 km	MPC · JPL
257296 Jessicaamy	2009 HT_{57}	Jessicaamy	April 20, 2009	Zadko	Todd, M.	EUN	1.5 km	MPC · JPL
257297	2009 HY_{58}	—	April 17, 2009	Catalina	CSS	·	1.2 km	MPC · JPL
257298	2009 HA_{59}	—	April 18, 2009	Catalina	CSS	H	870 m	MPC · JPL
257299	2009 HB_{60}	—	April 22, 2009	Mount Lemmon	Mount Lemmon Survey	·	1.2 km	MPC · JPL
257300	2009 HE_{61}	—	April 20, 2009	Mount Lemmon	Mount Lemmon Survey	MAS	790 m	MPC · JPL

== 257301–257400 ==
back to top

Designation			Discovery			Properties		Ref
Permanent	Provisional	Named after	Date	Site	Discoverer(s)	Category	Diam.	Ref
257301	2009 HT_{61}	—	April 20, 2009	Mount Lemmon	Mount Lemmon Survey	·	1.4 km	MPC · JPL
257302	2009 HX_{61}	—	April 20, 2009	Mount Lemmon	Mount Lemmon Survey	·	1.3 km	MPC · JPL
257303	2009 HS_{65}	—	April 23, 2009	Kitt Peak	Spacewatch	H	710 m	MPC · JPL
257304	2009 HT_{68}	—	April 21, 2009	Mount Lemmon	Mount Lemmon Survey	·	1.9 km	MPC · JPL
257305	2009 HS_{69}	—	April 22, 2009	Mount Lemmon	Mount Lemmon Survey	·	1.5 km	MPC · JPL
257306	2009 HZ_{72}	—	April 28, 2009	Catalina	CSS	·	4.5 km	MPC · JPL
257307	2009 HK_{75}	—	April 28, 2009	Catalina	CSS	·	1.6 km	MPC · JPL
257308	2009 HM_{77}	—	April 22, 2009	La Sagra	OAM	NYS	1.4 km	MPC · JPL
257309	2009 HU_{83}	—	April 27, 2009	Kitt Peak	Spacewatch	·	1.8 km	MPC · JPL
257310	2009 HU_{85}	—	April 29, 2009	Kitt Peak	Spacewatch	·	1.4 km	MPC · JPL
257311	2009 HM_{88}	—	April 30, 2009	La Sagra	OAM	ERI	1.8 km	MPC · JPL
257312	2009 HT_{88}	—	April 22, 2009	La Sagra	OAM	NYS	1.3 km	MPC · JPL
257313	2009 HW_{88}	—	April 23, 2009	La Sagra	OAM	·	1.2 km	MPC · JPL
257314	2009 HY_{88}	—	April 24, 2009	Cerro Burek	Burek, Cerro	·	1.7 km	MPC · JPL
257315	2009 HU_{89}	—	April 29, 2009	Kitt Peak	Spacewatch	·	4.1 km	MPC · JPL
257316	2009 HJ_{90}	—	April 19, 2009	Mount Lemmon	Mount Lemmon Survey	·	1.4 km	MPC · JPL
257317	2009 HS_{90}	—	April 20, 2009	Mount Lemmon	Mount Lemmon Survey	·	1.4 km	MPC · JPL
257318	2009 HD_{92}	—	April 29, 2009	Kitt Peak	Spacewatch	·	1.1 km	MPC · JPL
257319	2009 HN_{92}	—	April 30, 2009	Kitt Peak	Spacewatch	·	1.2 km	MPC · JPL
257320	2009 HE_{94}	—	April 26, 2009	Moletai	K. Černis, Zdanavicius, J.	V	890 m	MPC · JPL
257321	2009 HF_{94}	—	April 21, 2009	Mount Lemmon	Mount Lemmon Survey	·	1.4 km	MPC · JPL
257322	2009 HK_{97}	—	April 17, 2009	Kitt Peak	Spacewatch	EUN	1.7 km	MPC · JPL
257323	2009 HC_{98}	—	April 19, 2009	Kitt Peak	Spacewatch	·	2.4 km	MPC · JPL
257324	2009 HS_{98}	—	April 28, 2009	Mount Lemmon	Mount Lemmon Survey	·	1.6 km	MPC · JPL
257325	2009 HN_{99}	—	April 21, 2009	Kitt Peak	Spacewatch	·	1.6 km	MPC · JPL
257326	2009 HA_{101}	—	April 26, 2009	Kitt Peak	Spacewatch	EOS	2.5 km	MPC · JPL
257327	2009 HE_{101}	—	April 22, 2009	Mount Lemmon	Mount Lemmon Survey	·	1.7 km	MPC · JPL
257328	2009 HF_{101}	—	April 23, 2009	Kitt Peak	Spacewatch	·	1.6 km	MPC · JPL
257329	2009 HK_{102}	—	April 21, 2009	Kitt Peak	Spacewatch	·	770 m	MPC · JPL
257330	2009 HD_{103}	—	April 17, 2009	Kitt Peak	Spacewatch	·	2.1 km	MPC · JPL
257331	2009 HN_{103}	—	April 18, 2009	Mount Lemmon	Mount Lemmon Survey	·	760 m	MPC · JPL
257332	2009 HD_{105}	—	April 19, 2009	Kitt Peak	Spacewatch	MAR	1.2 km	MPC · JPL
257333	2009 HY_{105}	—	April 16, 2009	Siding Spring	SSS	·	3.0 km	MPC · JPL
257334	2009 JM	—	May 2, 2009	La Sagra	OAM	·	2.5 km	MPC · JPL
257335	2009 JZ	—	May 4, 2009	La Sagra	OAM	·	2.9 km	MPC · JPL
257336 Noeliasanchez	2009 JA_{1}	Noeliasanchez	May 4, 2009	La Sagra	OAM	T_{j} (2.99) · EUP	7.1 km	MPC · JPL
257337	2009 JG_{9}	—	May 14, 2009	Kitt Peak	Spacewatch	·	4.9 km	MPC · JPL
257338	2009 JO_{10}	—	May 14, 2009	Mount Lemmon	Mount Lemmon Survey	·	1.8 km	MPC · JPL
257339	2009 JZ_{12}	—	May 2, 2009	La Sagra	OAM	·	990 m	MPC · JPL
257340	2009 JC_{13}	—	May 2, 2009	La Sagra	OAM	·	2.6 km	MPC · JPL
257341	2009 JE_{16}	—	May 1, 2009	Mount Lemmon	Mount Lemmon Survey	·	3.0 km	MPC · JPL
257342	2009 JG_{16}	—	May 4, 2009	Mount Lemmon	Mount Lemmon Survey	·	2.1 km	MPC · JPL
257343	2009 JA_{17}	—	May 1, 2009	Mount Lemmon	Mount Lemmon Survey	V	750 m	MPC · JPL
257344	2009 JG_{17}	—	May 15, 2009	Siding Spring	SSS	·	3.1 km	MPC · JPL
257345	2009 KR_{1}	—	May 17, 2009	La Sagra	OAM	·	1.0 km	MPC · JPL
257346	2009 KA_{3}	—	May 20, 2009	Mayhill	Lowe, A.	·	1.6 km	MPC · JPL
257347	2009 KC_{4}	—	May 24, 2009	Catalina	CSS	V	760 m	MPC · JPL
257348	2009 KN_{7}	—	May 26, 2009	La Sagra	OAM	ERI	2.0 km	MPC · JPL
257349	2009 KD_{8}	—	May 28, 2009	La Sagra	OAM	·	2.1 km	MPC · JPL
257350	2009 KF_{8}	—	May 28, 2009	La Sagra	OAM	·	1.6 km	MPC · JPL
257351	2009 KU_{14}	—	May 26, 2009	Catalina	CSS	·	1.8 km	MPC · JPL
257352	2009 KG_{15}	—	May 26, 2009	Catalina	CSS	·	4.1 km	MPC · JPL
257353	2009 KL_{15}	—	May 26, 2009	Catalina	CSS	·	2.6 km	MPC · JPL
257354	2009 KT_{18}	—	May 27, 2009	Mount Lemmon	Mount Lemmon Survey	·	2.3 km	MPC · JPL
257355	2009 KT_{22}	—	May 25, 2009	Mount Lemmon	Mount Lemmon Survey	·	2.9 km	MPC · JPL
257356	2009 KD_{23}	—	May 27, 2009	Kitt Peak	Spacewatch	·	4.3 km	MPC · JPL
257357	2009 KQ_{30}	—	May 17, 2009	Kitt Peak	Spacewatch	·	1.5 km	MPC · JPL
257358	2009 LT	—	June 11, 2009	La Sagra	OAM	·	1.1 km	MPC · JPL
257359	2009 LY_{4}	—	June 14, 2009	Kitt Peak	Spacewatch	EUN	1.9 km	MPC · JPL
257360	2009 MA_{1}	—	June 17, 2009	La Sagra	OAM	·	5.3 km	MPC · JPL
257361	2009 ME_{7}	—	June 24, 2009	La Sagra	OAM	·	1.9 km	MPC · JPL
257362	2009 MR_{8}	—	June 27, 2009	La Sagra	OAM	·	1.9 km	MPC · JPL
257363	2009 NC_{2}	—	July 14, 2009	Kitt Peak	Spacewatch	CYB	6.1 km	MPC · JPL
257364	2009 OH	—	July 16, 2009	La Sagra	OAM	·	4.0 km	MPC · JPL
257365	2009 OZ	—	July 19, 2009	La Sagra	OAM	·	2.5 km	MPC · JPL
257366	2009 OJ_{4}	—	July 23, 2009	Tiki	Teamo, N.	·	5.0 km	MPC · JPL
257367	2009 OD_{19}	—	July 28, 2009	Kitt Peak	Spacewatch	·	2.6 km	MPC · JPL
257368	2009 OO_{21}	—	July 31, 2009	Sandlot	G. Hug	·	3.7 km	MPC · JPL
257369	2009 OF_{24}	—	July 27, 2009	Kitt Peak	Spacewatch	·	5.8 km	MPC · JPL
257370	2009 OR_{24}	—	July 27, 2009	Catalina	CSS	·	5.2 km	MPC · JPL
257371 Miguelbello	2009 PM_{4}	Miguelbello	August 14, 2009	La Sagra	OAM	·	4.1 km	MPC · JPL
257372	2009 PY_{9}	—	August 15, 2009	Kachina	Kachina	EOS	2.7 km	MPC · JPL
257373	2009 PQ_{20}	—	August 1, 2009	Siding Spring	SSS	LUT	6.9 km	MPC · JPL
257374	2009 QA_{13}	—	August 16, 2009	Kitt Peak	Spacewatch	CYB	5.1 km	MPC · JPL
257375	2009 QZ_{47}	—	August 28, 2009	La Sagra	OAM	L4	10 km	MPC · JPL
257376	2009 QW_{57}	—	August 17, 2009	Kitt Peak	Spacewatch	L4	10 km	MPC · JPL
257377	2009 RG_{5}	—	September 14, 2009	Needville	Sexton, C., J. Dellinger	HYG	3.8 km	MPC · JPL
257378	2009 RN_{9}	—	September 12, 2009	Kitt Peak	Spacewatch	3:2	6.2 km	MPC · JPL
257379	2009 RP_{55}	—	September 15, 2009	Kitt Peak	Spacewatch	·	3.3 km	MPC · JPL
257380	2009 SO_{10}	—	September 16, 2009	Kitt Peak	Spacewatch	L4	10 km	MPC · JPL
257381	2009 SK_{38}	—	September 16, 2009	Kitt Peak	Spacewatch	L4	8.7 km	MPC · JPL
257382	2009 SR_{49}	—	September 17, 2009	Kitt Peak	Spacewatch	·	4.0 km	MPC · JPL
257383	2009 SO_{52}	—	September 17, 2009	Kitt Peak	Spacewatch	L4	10 km	MPC · JPL
257384	2009 SO_{60}	—	September 17, 2009	Kitt Peak	Spacewatch	L4	10 km	MPC · JPL
257385	2009 ST_{121}	—	September 18, 2009	Kitt Peak	Spacewatch	L4	10 km	MPC · JPL
257386	2009 SN_{122}	—	September 18, 2009	Kitt Peak	Spacewatch	L4	10 km	MPC · JPL
257387	2009 SO_{137}	—	September 18, 2009	Kitt Peak	Spacewatch	L4	9.1 km	MPC · JPL
257388	2009 SD_{154}	—	September 20, 2009	Kitt Peak	Spacewatch	L4	8.9 km	MPC · JPL
257389	2009 SY_{155}	—	September 20, 2009	Kitt Peak	Spacewatch	L4	10 km	MPC · JPL
257390	2009 SM_{189}	—	September 22, 2009	Kitt Peak	Spacewatch	L4	9.2 km	MPC · JPL
257391	2009 SD_{200}	—	September 22, 2009	Kitt Peak	Spacewatch	·	4.3 km	MPC · JPL
257392	2009 ST_{203}	—	September 22, 2009	Kitt Peak	Spacewatch	L4	10 km	MPC · JPL
257393	2009 SZ_{211}	—	September 23, 2009	Kitt Peak	Spacewatch	L4	9.7 km	MPC · JPL
257394	2009 SV_{215}	—	September 24, 2009	Kitt Peak	Spacewatch	L4	9.0 km	MPC · JPL
257395	2009 SW_{216}	—	September 24, 2009	Kitt Peak	Spacewatch	L4	10 km	MPC · JPL
257396	2009 SF_{220}	—	September 24, 2009	Mount Lemmon	Mount Lemmon Survey	·	2.7 km	MPC · JPL
257397	2009 SL_{229}	—	September 23, 2009	Mount Lemmon	Mount Lemmon Survey	L4	10 km	MPC · JPL
257398	2009 SY_{246}	—	September 18, 2009	Kitt Peak	Spacewatch	L4	10 km	MPC · JPL
257399	2009 SX_{253}	—	September 25, 2009	Kitt Peak	Spacewatch	L4	16 km	MPC · JPL
257400	2009 SK_{264}	—	September 23, 2009	Mount Lemmon	Mount Lemmon Survey	L4	10 km	MPC · JPL

== 257401–257500 ==
back to top

Designation			Discovery			Properties		Ref
Permanent	Provisional	Named after	Date	Site	Discoverer(s)	Category	Diam.	Ref
257401	2009 SM_{264}	—	September 23, 2009	Mount Lemmon	Mount Lemmon Survey	L4	10 km	MPC · JPL
257402	2009 SG_{297}	—	September 28, 2009	Catalina	CSS	L4	20 km	MPC · JPL
257403	2009 SO_{299}	—	September 29, 2009	Mount Lemmon	Mount Lemmon Survey	SYL · CYB	5.7 km	MPC · JPL
257404	2009 SF_{315}	—	September 19, 2009	Kitt Peak	Spacewatch	L4	10 km	MPC · JPL
257405	2009 SG_{330}	—	September 18, 2009	Catalina	CSS	L4	20 km	MPC · JPL
257406	2009 ST_{334}	—	September 26, 2009	Kitt Peak	Spacewatch	L4	10 km	MPC · JPL
257407	2009 SO_{356}	—	September 17, 2009	Kitt Peak	Spacewatch	L4	9.7 km	MPC · JPL
257408	2009 SH_{358}	—	September 16, 2009	Catalina	CSS	·	5.6 km	MPC · JPL
257409	2009 SB_{360}	—	September 27, 2009	Socorro	LINEAR	L4	11 km	MPC · JPL
257410	2009 TP_{15}	—	October 1, 2009	Mount Lemmon	Mount Lemmon Survey	·	4.3 km	MPC · JPL
257411	2009 TM_{18}	—	October 9, 2009	Catalina	CSS	L4	10 km	MPC · JPL
257412	2009 UY_{2}	—	October 16, 2009	Socorro	LINEAR	L4	20 km	MPC · JPL
257413	2009 UB_{61}	—	October 17, 2009	Mount Lemmon	Mount Lemmon Survey	L4	10 km	MPC · JPL
257414	2009 UE_{71}	—	October 22, 2009	Mount Lemmon	Mount Lemmon Survey	·	930 m	MPC · JPL
257415	2009 UP_{118}	—	October 23, 2009	Mount Lemmon	Mount Lemmon Survey	L4	8.3 km	MPC · JPL
257416	2009 UV_{147}	—	October 16, 2009	Mount Lemmon	Mount Lemmon Survey	L4	10 km	MPC · JPL
257417	2009 WT	—	November 16, 2009	Calvin-Rehoboth	L. A. Molnar	·	4.4 km	MPC · JPL
257418	2009 WD_{2}	—	November 16, 2009	Mount Lemmon	Mount Lemmon Survey	L4	10 km	MPC · JPL
257419	2009 YE_{19}	—	December 26, 2009	Kitt Peak	Spacewatch	MRX	1.3 km	MPC · JPL
257420	2009 YT_{24}	—	December 18, 2009	Mount Lemmon	Mount Lemmon Survey	·	3.1 km	MPC · JPL
257421	2010 BR_{11}	—	January 16, 2010	WISE	WISE	·	4.3 km	MPC · JPL
257422	2010 FR_{47}	—	March 22, 2010	ESA OGS	ESA OGS	DOR · fast	4.4 km	MPC · JPL
257423	2010 FM_{48}	—	March 22, 2010	ESA OGS	ESA OGS	MAS	1.0 km	MPC · JPL
257424	2010 HX_{90}	—	April 29, 2010	WISE	WISE	·	3.1 km	MPC · JPL
257425 Davykirkpatrick	2010 JD_{24}	Davykirkpatrick	May 4, 2010	WISE	WISE	·	5.3 km	MPC · JPL
257426	2010 KB_{99}	—	May 28, 2010	WISE	WISE	·	1.8 km	MPC · JPL
257427	2010 KX_{104}	—	May 29, 2010	WISE	WISE	·	3.3 km	MPC · JPL
257428	2010 LH_{38}	—	June 6, 2010	WISE	WISE	·	3.6 km	MPC · JPL
257429	2010 LA_{46}	—	June 8, 2010	WISE	WISE	DOR	3.3 km	MPC · JPL
257430 Chrisgelino	2010 LC_{95}	Chrisgelino	June 12, 2010	WISE	WISE	THB	4.5 km	MPC · JPL
257431	2010 LT_{131}	—	June 15, 2010	WISE	WISE	·	5.8 km	MPC · JPL
257432	2010 MX_{112}	—	June 18, 2010	Mount Lemmon	Mount Lemmon Survey	·	2.6 km	MPC · JPL
257433	2010 NX_{5}	—	July 5, 2010	Kitt Peak	Spacewatch	·	2.8 km	MPC · JPL
257434	2010 ND_{6}	—	July 5, 2010	Mount Lemmon	Mount Lemmon Survey	·	1.3 km	MPC · JPL
257435	2010 NG_{35}	—	July 8, 2010	WISE	WISE	·	3.3 km	MPC · JPL
257436	2010 NO_{42}	—	July 9, 2010	WISE	WISE	·	4.1 km	MPC · JPL
257437 Schulyervandyk	2010 NW_{68}	Schulyervandyk	July 14, 2010	WISE	WISE	·	2.1 km	MPC · JPL
257438 Marcyharbut	2010 OH_{98}	Marcyharbut	July 28, 2010	WISE	WISE	·	4.0 km	MPC · JPL
257439 Peppeprosperini	2010 PL_{23}	Peppeprosperini	August 9, 2010	Frasso Sabino	Sabino, Frasso	·	2.0 km	MPC · JPL
257440	2010 PF_{65}	—	August 10, 2010	Kitt Peak	Spacewatch	·	3.3 km	MPC · JPL
257441	2010 QZ_{3}	—	August 19, 2010	Purple Mountain	PMO NEO Survey Program	·	1.7 km	MPC · JPL
257442	2010 RH_{71}	—	September 9, 2010	La Sagra	OAM	·	670 m	MPC · JPL
257443	2641 P-L	—	September 24, 1960	Palomar	C. J. van Houten, I. van Houten-Groeneveld, T. Gehrels	NYS	1.1 km	MPC · JPL
257444	4188 P-L	—	September 24, 1960	Palomar	C. J. van Houten, I. van Houten-Groeneveld, T. Gehrels	EUN	1.7 km	MPC · JPL
257445	6010 P-L	—	September 24, 1960	Palomar	C. J. van Houten, I. van Houten-Groeneveld, T. Gehrels	·	1.2 km	MPC · JPL
257446	6251 P-L	—	September 24, 1960	Palomar	C. J. van Houten, I. van Houten-Groeneveld, T. Gehrels	NYS	1.0 km	MPC · JPL
257447	1037 T-2	—	September 29, 1973	Palomar	C. J. van Houten, I. van Houten-Groeneveld, T. Gehrels	NYS	1.3 km	MPC · JPL
257448	2236 T-2	—	September 29, 1973	Palomar	C. J. van Houten, I. van Houten-Groeneveld, T. Gehrels	·	1.4 km	MPC · JPL
257449	4219 T-2	—	September 29, 1973	Palomar	C. J. van Houten, I. van Houten-Groeneveld, T. Gehrels	·	1.4 km	MPC · JPL
257450	2005 T-3	—	October 16, 1977	Palomar	C. J. van Houten, I. van Houten-Groeneveld, T. Gehrels	·	770 m	MPC · JPL
257451	2138 T-3	—	October 16, 1977	Palomar	C. J. van Houten, I. van Houten-Groeneveld, T. Gehrels	·	980 m	MPC · JPL
257452	2408 T-3	—	October 16, 1977	Palomar	C. J. van Houten, I. van Houten-Groeneveld, T. Gehrels	·	3.1 km	MPC · JPL
257453	4003 T-3	—	October 16, 1977	Palomar	C. J. van Houten, I. van Houten-Groeneveld, T. Gehrels	·	3.4 km	MPC · JPL
257454	4154 T-3	—	October 16, 1977	Palomar	C. J. van Houten, I. van Houten-Groeneveld, T. Gehrels	·	1.2 km	MPC · JPL
257455	4311 T-3	—	October 16, 1977	Palomar	C. J. van Houten, I. van Houten-Groeneveld, T. Gehrels	·	4.3 km	MPC · JPL
257456	1981 DA_{3}	—	February 28, 1981	Siding Spring	S. J. Bus	HIL · 3:2	8.1 km	MPC · JPL
257457	1981 EG_{33}	—	March 1, 1981	Siding Spring	S. J. Bus	·	1.1 km	MPC · JPL
257458	1981 EV_{36}	—	March 7, 1981	Siding Spring	S. J. Bus	EOS	2.7 km	MPC · JPL
257459	1981 EA_{37}	—	March 7, 1981	Siding Spring	S. J. Bus	·	2.2 km	MPC · JPL
257460	1981 ES_{37}	—	March 1, 1981	Siding Spring	S. J. Bus	·	1.0 km	MPC · JPL
257461	1990 UT_{2}	—	October 18, 1990	Kitt Peak	Spacewatch	·	890 m	MPC · JPL
257462	1992 UE_{7}	—	October 18, 1992	Kitt Peak	Spacewatch	THM	2.8 km	MPC · JPL
257463	1992 WW_{6}	—	November 19, 1992	Kitt Peak	Spacewatch	·	2.4 km	MPC · JPL
257464	1993 FC_{26}	—	March 21, 1993	La Silla	UESAC	·	1.6 km	MPC · JPL
257465	1993 OE_{6}	—	July 20, 1993	La Silla	E. W. Elst	(5)	2.1 km	MPC · JPL
257466	1993 TX_{5}	—	October 9, 1993	Kitt Peak	Spacewatch	·	2.1 km	MPC · JPL
257467	1993 TU_{41}	—	October 9, 1993	La Silla	E. W. Elst	(5)	1.5 km	MPC · JPL
257468	1994 CU_{3}	—	February 10, 1994	Kitt Peak	Spacewatch	·	1.2 km	MPC · JPL
257469	1994 CG_{7}	—	February 15, 1994	Kitt Peak	Spacewatch	HOF	3.7 km	MPC · JPL
257470	1994 RE_{8}	—	September 12, 1994	Kitt Peak	Spacewatch	EOS	2.6 km	MPC · JPL
257471	1994 SA	—	September 27, 1994	Kitt Peak	Spacewatch	·	380 m	MPC · JPL
257472	1994 SX_{2}	—	September 28, 1994	Kitt Peak	Spacewatch	NYS	1.3 km	MPC · JPL
257473	1994 SC_{4}	—	September 28, 1994	Kitt Peak	Spacewatch	·	2.4 km	MPC · JPL
257474	1994 WF_{8}	—	November 28, 1994	Kitt Peak	Spacewatch	·	4.7 km	MPC · JPL
257475	1995 DP_{5}	—	February 22, 1995	Kitt Peak	Spacewatch	HYG	3.5 km	MPC · JPL
257476	1995 FE_{3}	—	March 23, 1995	Kitt Peak	Spacewatch	·	1.9 km	MPC · JPL
257477	1995 FG_{3}	—	March 23, 1995	Kitt Peak	Spacewatch	MIS	3.0 km	MPC · JPL
257478	1995 HJ_{3}	—	April 26, 1995	Kitt Peak	Spacewatch	·	770 m	MPC · JPL
257479	1995 MD_{6}	—	June 24, 1995	Kitt Peak	Spacewatch	·	2.3 km	MPC · JPL
257480	1995 NR	—	July 1, 1995	Kitt Peak	Spacewatch	T_{j} (2.98) · EUP	4.4 km	MPC · JPL
257481	1995 OX_{3}	—	July 22, 1995	Kitt Peak	Spacewatch	NYS	1.4 km	MPC · JPL
257482	1995 OW_{10}	—	July 27, 1995	Kitt Peak	Spacewatch	·	2.2 km	MPC · JPL
257483	1995 OD_{11}	—	July 27, 1995	Kitt Peak	Spacewatch	·	1.1 km	MPC · JPL
257484	1995 QW_{13}	—	August 25, 1995	Kitt Peak	Spacewatch	V	710 m	MPC · JPL
257485	1995 SD_{23}	—	September 19, 1995	Kitt Peak	Spacewatch	·	2.9 km	MPC · JPL
257486	1995 SC_{24}	—	September 19, 1995	Kitt Peak	Spacewatch	L4	8.9 km	MPC · JPL
257487	1995 SQ_{24}	—	September 19, 1995	Kitt Peak	Spacewatch	KOR	1.5 km	MPC · JPL
257488	1995 SD_{27}	—	September 19, 1995	Kitt Peak	Spacewatch	MAS	930 m	MPC · JPL
257489	1995 UY_{12}	—	October 17, 1995	Kitt Peak	Spacewatch	KOR	1.5 km	MPC · JPL
257490	1995 UT_{17}	—	October 18, 1995	Kitt Peak	Spacewatch	·	1.6 km	MPC · JPL
257491	1995 UK_{38}	—	October 22, 1995	Kitt Peak	Spacewatch	MAS	810 m	MPC · JPL
257492	1995 UM_{54}	—	October 17, 1995	Kitt Peak	Spacewatch	·	1.3 km	MPC · JPL
257493	1995 UY_{58}	—	October 18, 1995	Kitt Peak	Spacewatch	NYS	1.5 km	MPC · JPL
257494	1995 UB_{66}	—	October 17, 1995	Kitt Peak	Spacewatch	MAS	800 m	MPC · JPL
257495	1995 UE_{67}	—	October 18, 1995	Kitt Peak	Spacewatch	L4	10 km	MPC · JPL
257496	1995 VQ_{9}	—	November 15, 1995	Kitt Peak	Spacewatch	MAS	780 m	MPC · JPL
257497	1995 VL_{13}	—	November 15, 1995	Kitt Peak	Spacewatch	CLA	2.2 km	MPC · JPL
257498	1995 WO_{14}	—	November 17, 1995	Kitt Peak	Spacewatch	·	1.2 km	MPC · JPL
257499	1995 WX_{22}	—	November 18, 1995	Kitt Peak	Spacewatch	MAS	800 m	MPC · JPL
257500	1995 WL_{29}	—	November 19, 1995	Kitt Peak	Spacewatch	·	1.6 km	MPC · JPL

== 257501–257600 ==
back to top

Designation			Discovery			Properties		Ref
Permanent	Provisional	Named after	Date	Site	Discoverer(s)	Category	Diam.	Ref
257501	1995 YS_{5}	—	December 16, 1995	Kitt Peak	Spacewatch	·	3.2 km	MPC · JPL
257502	1996 AQ_{10}	—	January 13, 1996	Kitt Peak	Spacewatch	NYS	1.1 km	MPC · JPL
257503	1996 BQ_{11}	—	January 24, 1996	Kitt Peak	Spacewatch	·	3.3 km	MPC · JPL
257504	1996 GZ_{5}	—	April 11, 1996	Kitt Peak	Spacewatch	·	780 m	MPC · JPL
257505	1996 RH_{33}	—	September 15, 1996	La Silla	Uppsala-DLR Trojan Survey	L4	13 km	MPC · JPL
257506	1996 SN_{7}	—	September 23, 1996	Prescott	P. G. Comba	·	2.8 km	MPC · JPL
257507	1996 TG_{35}	—	October 11, 1996	Kitt Peak	Spacewatch	·	1.1 km	MPC · JPL
257508	1996 VJ_{16}	—	November 5, 1996	Kitt Peak	Spacewatch	DOR	2.7 km	MPC · JPL
257509	1996 VC_{18}	—	November 6, 1996	Kitt Peak	Spacewatch	KOR	1.3 km	MPC · JPL
257510	1996 VD_{33}	—	November 5, 1996	Kitt Peak	Spacewatch	·	840 m	MPC · JPL
257511	1996 XY_{35}	—	December 12, 1996	Kitt Peak	Spacewatch	V	740 m	MPC · JPL
257512	1997 AS_{14}	—	January 12, 1997	Haleakala	NEAT	·	1.3 km	MPC · JPL
257513	1997 AJ_{24}	—	January 15, 1997	Campo Imperatore	A. Boattini, A. Di Paola	MAS	790 m	MPC · JPL
257514	1997 CL_{4}	—	February 3, 1997	Modra	A. Galád, Pravda, A.	GEF	1.9 km	MPC · JPL
257515 Zapperudi	1997 CD_{6}	Zapperudi	February 6, 1997	Linz	Linz	·	3.5 km	MPC · JPL
257516	1997 CO_{25}	—	February 13, 1997	Kitt Peak	Spacewatch	·	1.6 km	MPC · JPL
257517	1997 EZ_{42}	—	March 10, 1997	Socorro	LINEAR	·	1.4 km	MPC · JPL
257518	1997 GL_{25}	—	April 8, 1997	Kitt Peak	Spacewatch	·	1.6 km	MPC · JPL
257519	1997 KV_{3}	—	May 29, 1997	Kitt Peak	Spacewatch	MAR	1.6 km	MPC · JPL
257520	1997 ML	—	June 26, 1997	Kitt Peak	Spacewatch	·	2.1 km	MPC · JPL
257521	1997 MX_{5}	—	June 26, 1997	Kitt Peak	Spacewatch	·	1.8 km	MPC · JPL
257522	1997 RH_{9}	—	September 11, 1997	Modra	L. Kornoš, P. Kolény	·	1.8 km	MPC · JPL
257523	1997 SH_{11}	—	September 30, 1997	Prescott	P. G. Comba	(5)	1.9 km	MPC · JPL
257524	1997 SC_{13}	—	September 28, 1997	Kitt Peak	Spacewatch	·	920 m	MPC · JPL
257525	1997 SJ_{14}	—	September 28, 1997	Kitt Peak	Spacewatch	·	1.0 km	MPC · JPL
257526	1997 SM_{27}	—	September 30, 1997	Kitt Peak	Spacewatch	·	1.8 km	MPC · JPL
257527	1997 TY_{23}	—	October 11, 1997	Kitt Peak	Spacewatch	·	2.3 km	MPC · JPL
257528	1997 UY_{22}	—	October 25, 1997	Anderson Mesa	B. A. Skiff	·	670 m	MPC · JPL
257529	1997 WA_{14}	—	November 22, 1997	Kitt Peak	Spacewatch	·	1.1 km	MPC · JPL
257530	1997 YO_{17}	—	December 31, 1997	Kitt Peak	Spacewatch	NEM	2.8 km	MPC · JPL
257531	1998 BL_{18}	—	January 23, 1998	Kitt Peak	Spacewatch	(12739)	1.7 km	MPC · JPL
257532	1998 BN_{18}	—	January 23, 1998	Kitt Peak	Spacewatch	·	2.1 km	MPC · JPL
257533 Iquique	1998 CN_{4}	Iquique	February 6, 1998	La Silla	E. W. Elst	H	900 m	MPC · JPL
257534	1998 DL_{12}	—	February 23, 1998	Kitt Peak	Spacewatch	·	1.6 km	MPC · JPL
257535	1998 DG_{13}	—	February 23, 1998	Haleakala	NEAT	PHO	1.5 km	MPC · JPL
257536	1998 EU_{3}	—	March 2, 1998	Oizumi	T. Kobayashi	·	570 m	MPC · JPL
257537	1998 FH_{38}	—	March 20, 1998	Socorro	LINEAR	(18466)	3.7 km	MPC · JPL
257538	1998 FO_{148}	—	March 20, 1998	Kitt Peak	Spacewatch	·	2.2 km	MPC · JPL
257539	1998 HP	—	April 17, 1998	Kitt Peak	Spacewatch	·	830 m	MPC · JPL
257540	1998 HV_{26}	—	April 21, 1998	Kitt Peak	Spacewatch	HOF	3.7 km	MPC · JPL
257541	1998 HQ_{56}	—	April 21, 1998	Socorro	LINEAR	·	2.6 km	MPC · JPL
257542	1998 MW_{1}	—	June 20, 1998	Kitt Peak	Spacewatch	·	1.7 km	MPC · JPL
257543	1998 MS_{16}	—	June 27, 1998	Kitt Peak	Spacewatch	·	2.3 km	MPC · JPL
257544	1998 QU_{4}	—	August 22, 1998	Xinglong	SCAP	·	3.9 km	MPC · JPL
257545	1998 RS_{12}	—	September 14, 1998	Kitt Peak	Spacewatch	·	610 m	MPC · JPL
257546	1998 RH_{21}	—	September 15, 1998	Kitt Peak	Spacewatch	·	1.4 km	MPC · JPL
257547	1998 SO_{19}	—	September 20, 1998	Kitt Peak	Spacewatch	NYS	1.2 km	MPC · JPL
257548	1998 SV_{40}	—	September 25, 1998	Kitt Peak	Spacewatch	·	4.9 km	MPC · JPL
257549	1998 SX_{40}	—	September 25, 1998	Kitt Peak	Spacewatch	·	3.2 km	MPC · JPL
257550	1998 SV_{43}	—	September 26, 1998	Xinglong	SCAP	TIR	4.1 km	MPC · JPL
257551	1998 SB_{48}	—	September 26, 1998	Kitt Peak	Spacewatch	MAS	830 m	MPC · JPL
257552	1998 SY_{50}	—	September 26, 1998	Kitt Peak	Spacewatch	(5)	1.3 km	MPC · JPL
257553	1998 SF_{69}	—	September 19, 1998	Socorro	LINEAR	·	3.0 km	MPC · JPL
257554	1998 SO_{81}	—	September 26, 1998	Socorro	LINEAR	V	950 m	MPC · JPL
257555	1998 SM_{104}	—	September 26, 1998	Socorro	LINEAR	NYS	1.4 km	MPC · JPL
257556	1998 SF_{174}	—	September 19, 1998	Apache Point	SDSS	THM	2.9 km	MPC · JPL
257557	1998 TO_{8}	—	October 12, 1998	Kitt Peak	Spacewatch	·	3.5 km	MPC · JPL
257558	1998 TM_{16}	—	October 12, 1998	Caussols	ODAS	·	1.7 km	MPC · JPL
257559	1998 TL_{19}	—	October 15, 1998	Xinglong	SCAP	·	4.8 km	MPC · JPL
257560	1998 TP_{25}	—	October 14, 1998	Kitt Peak	Spacewatch	·	1.8 km	MPC · JPL
257561	1998 TS_{25}	—	October 14, 1998	Kitt Peak	Spacewatch	L4	10 km	MPC · JPL
257562	1998 TT_{35}	—	October 15, 1998	Kitt Peak	Spacewatch	·	940 m	MPC · JPL
257563	1998 UA_{2}	—	October 19, 1998	Caussols	ODAS	·	1.6 km	MPC · JPL
257564	1998 UJ_{34}	—	October 28, 1998	Socorro	LINEAR	NYS	1.7 km	MPC · JPL
257565	1998 UH_{49}	—	October 18, 1998	Anderson Mesa	LONEOS	·	2.2 km	MPC · JPL
257566	1998 WP_{37}	—	November 21, 1998	Kitt Peak	Spacewatch	L4	10 km	MPC · JPL
257567	1998 XU_{6}	—	December 8, 1998	Kitt Peak	Spacewatch	·	1.7 km	MPC · JPL
257568	1998 YP_{13}	—	December 19, 1998	Kitt Peak	Spacewatch	·	1.9 km	MPC · JPL
257569	1998 YU_{15}	—	December 22, 1998	Kitt Peak	Spacewatch	(5)	1.5 km	MPC · JPL
257570	1998 YT_{16}	—	December 22, 1998	Kitt Peak	Spacewatch	·	1.6 km	MPC · JPL
257571	1998 YW_{20}	—	December 26, 1998	Kitt Peak	Spacewatch	·	1.8 km	MPC · JPL
257572	1999 CP_{1}	—	February 7, 1999	Oizumi	T. Kobayashi	·	2.0 km	MPC · JPL
257573	1999 CH_{4}	—	February 10, 1999	Woomera	F. B. Zoltowski	·	1.7 km	MPC · JPL
257574	1999 CP_{10}	—	February 12, 1999	Socorro	LINEAR	PHO	1.4 km	MPC · JPL
257575	1999 CR_{69}	—	February 12, 1999	Socorro	LINEAR	·	1.7 km	MPC · JPL
257576	1999 CN_{82}	—	February 10, 1999	Socorro	LINEAR	EUN	2.5 km	MPC · JPL
257577	1999 CE_{92}	—	February 10, 1999	Socorro	LINEAR	·	1.9 km	MPC · JPL
257578	1999 CS_{108}	—	February 12, 1999	Socorro	LINEAR	·	2.9 km	MPC · JPL
257579	1999 CZ_{156}	—	February 8, 1999	Kitt Peak	Spacewatch	·	1.8 km	MPC · JPL
257580	1999 DB_{9}	—	February 18, 1999	Socorro	LINEAR	·	2.7 km	MPC · JPL
257581	1999 FE_{8}	—	March 20, 1999	Socorro	LINEAR	·	1.9 km	MPC · JPL
257582	1999 FR_{70}	—	March 20, 1999	Apache Point	SDSS	·	760 m	MPC · JPL
257583	1999 GZ_{54}	—	April 6, 1999	Kitt Peak	Spacewatch	·	1.7 km	MPC · JPL
257584	1999 JZ_{35}	—	May 10, 1999	Socorro	LINEAR	·	1.1 km	MPC · JPL
257585	1999 JQ_{36}	—	May 10, 1999	Socorro	LINEAR	·	820 m	MPC · JPL
257586	1999 JK_{39}	—	May 10, 1999	Socorro	LINEAR	·	1.2 km	MPC · JPL
257587	1999 JR_{50}	—	May 10, 1999	Socorro	LINEAR	·	2.5 km	MPC · JPL
257588	1999 JF_{73}	—	May 12, 1999	Socorro	LINEAR	·	2.2 km	MPC · JPL
257589	1999 JV_{116}	—	May 13, 1999	Socorro	LINEAR	·	3.3 km	MPC · JPL
257590	1999 KY_{13}	—	May 18, 1999	Socorro	LINEAR	·	4.5 km	MPC · JPL
257591	1999 RM_{4}	—	September 3, 1999	Kitt Peak	Spacewatch	·	2.1 km	MPC · JPL
257592	1999 RW_{8}	—	September 4, 1999	Kitt Peak	Spacewatch	·	3.5 km	MPC · JPL
257593	1999 RZ_{13}	—	September 7, 1999	Socorro	LINEAR	·	840 m	MPC · JPL
257594	1999 RA_{31}	—	September 8, 1999	Socorro	LINEAR	·	1.8 km	MPC · JPL
257595	1999 RT_{40}	—	September 7, 1999	Socorro	LINEAR	PHO	1.6 km	MPC · JPL
257596	1999 RT_{45}	—	September 8, 1999	Uccle	T. Pauwels	·	3.2 km	MPC · JPL
257597	1999 RH_{66}	—	September 7, 1999	Socorro	LINEAR	·	1.1 km	MPC · JPL
257598	1999 RQ_{66}	—	September 7, 1999	Socorro	LINEAR	·	1.5 km	MPC · JPL
257599	1999 RN_{67}	—	September 7, 1999	Socorro	LINEAR	·	1.1 km	MPC · JPL
257600	1999 RT_{75}	—	September 7, 1999	Socorro	LINEAR	·	1.0 km	MPC · JPL

== 257601–257700 ==
back to top

Designation			Discovery			Properties		Ref
Permanent	Provisional	Named after	Date	Site	Discoverer(s)	Category	Diam.	Ref
257601	1999 RH_{85}	—	September 7, 1999	Socorro	LINEAR	·	850 m	MPC · JPL
257602	1999 RE_{103}	—	September 8, 1999	Socorro	LINEAR	·	3.3 km	MPC · JPL
257603	1999 RN_{107}	—	September 8, 1999	Socorro	LINEAR	·	1.4 km	MPC · JPL
257604	1999 RP_{171}	—	September 9, 1999	Socorro	LINEAR	V	1.1 km	MPC · JPL
257605	1999 RS_{200}	—	September 8, 1999	Socorro	LINEAR	(2076)	1.2 km	MPC · JPL
257606	1999 RJ_{206}	—	September 8, 1999	Socorro	LINEAR	·	3.3 km	MPC · JPL
257607	1999 RB_{208}	—	September 8, 1999	Socorro	LINEAR	·	3.7 km	MPC · JPL
257608	1999 RM_{213}	—	September 13, 1999	Bergisch Gladbach	W. Bickel	·	2.1 km	MPC · JPL
257609	1999 RQ_{214}	—	September 12, 1999	Bergisch Gladbach	W. Bickel	MAS	780 m	MPC · JPL
257610	1999 RM_{215}	—	September 3, 1999	Socorro	LINEAR	·	2.3 km	MPC · JPL
257611	1999 SC_{1}	—	September 16, 1999	Kitt Peak	Spacewatch	·	2.9 km	MPC · JPL
257612	1999 SH_{3}	—	September 22, 1999	Socorro	LINEAR	·	1.8 km	MPC · JPL
257613	1999 SV_{13}	—	September 29, 1999	Catalina	CSS	NYS	1.3 km	MPC · JPL
257614	1999 TF_{53}	—	October 1, 1999	Kitt Peak	Spacewatch	·	5.2 km	MPC · JPL
257615	1999 TJ_{71}	—	October 9, 1999	Kitt Peak	Spacewatch	·	1.7 km	MPC · JPL
257616	1999 TL_{71}	—	October 9, 1999	Kitt Peak	Spacewatch	NYS	1.5 km	MPC · JPL
257617	1999 TG_{73}	—	October 10, 1999	Kitt Peak	Spacewatch	·	660 m	MPC · JPL
257618	1999 TJ_{73}	—	October 10, 1999	Kitt Peak	Spacewatch	URS	5.1 km	MPC · JPL
257619	1999 TD_{74}	—	October 10, 1999	Kitt Peak	Spacewatch	·	3.5 km	MPC · JPL
257620	1999 TN_{75}	—	October 10, 1999	Kitt Peak	Spacewatch	·	1.9 km	MPC · JPL
257621	1999 TR_{120}	—	October 4, 1999	Socorro	LINEAR	·	1.8 km	MPC · JPL
257622	1999 TG_{126}	—	October 4, 1999	Socorro	LINEAR	NYS	1.0 km	MPC · JPL
257623	1999 TG_{135}	—	October 15, 1999	Socorro	LINEAR	NYS	1.3 km	MPC · JPL
257624	1999 TU_{137}	—	October 6, 1999	Socorro	LINEAR	·	1.3 km	MPC · JPL
257625	1999 TC_{138}	—	October 6, 1999	Socorro	LINEAR	NYS	1.1 km	MPC · JPL
257626	1999 TF_{140}	—	October 6, 1999	Socorro	LINEAR	·	1.9 km	MPC · JPL
257627	1999 TW_{165}	—	October 10, 1999	Socorro	LINEAR	·	1.4 km	MPC · JPL
257628	1999 TG_{168}	—	October 10, 1999	Socorro	LINEAR	EOS	2.7 km	MPC · JPL
257629	1999 TK_{169}	—	October 10, 1999	Socorro	LINEAR	·	2.9 km	MPC · JPL
257630	1999 TJ_{174}	—	October 10, 1999	Socorro	LINEAR	NYS	1.7 km	MPC · JPL
257631	1999 TK_{175}	—	October 10, 1999	Socorro	LINEAR	·	850 m	MPC · JPL
257632	1999 TA_{177}	—	October 10, 1999	Socorro	LINEAR	·	910 m	MPC · JPL
257633	1999 TV_{204}	—	October 13, 1999	Socorro	LINEAR	·	3.0 km	MPC · JPL
257634	1999 TJ_{217}	—	October 15, 1999	Socorro	LINEAR	·	1.6 km	MPC · JPL
257635	1999 TM_{218}	—	October 15, 1999	Socorro	LINEAR	NYS	1.3 km	MPC · JPL
257636	1999 TQ_{233}	—	October 3, 1999	Kitt Peak	Spacewatch	·	1.2 km	MPC · JPL
257637	1999 TW_{241}	—	October 4, 1999	Catalina	CSS	·	1.4 km	MPC · JPL
257638	1999 TQ_{244}	—	October 7, 1999	Catalina	CSS	·	960 m	MPC · JPL
257639	1999 TK_{252}	—	October 13, 1999	Socorro	LINEAR	EOS	3.1 km	MPC · JPL
257640	1999 TS_{261}	—	October 13, 1999	Socorro	LINEAR	·	3.0 km	MPC · JPL
257641	1999 TX_{263}	—	October 15, 1999	Kitt Peak	Spacewatch	·	2.9 km	MPC · JPL
257642	1999 TP_{265}	—	October 3, 1999	Socorro	LINEAR	·	6.4 km	MPC · JPL
257643	1999 TS_{282}	—	October 9, 1999	Socorro	LINEAR	·	2.1 km	MPC · JPL
257644	1999 TG_{290}	—	October 10, 1999	Socorro	LINEAR	·	1.5 km	MPC · JPL
257645	1999 TT_{292}	—	October 12, 1999	Socorro	LINEAR	·	1.1 km	MPC · JPL
257646	1999 TQ_{308}	—	October 4, 1999	Kitt Peak	Spacewatch	V	740 m	MPC · JPL
257647	1999 TV_{317}	—	October 12, 1999	Kitt Peak	Spacewatch	·	810 m	MPC · JPL
257648	1999 TY_{318}	—	October 12, 1999	Kitt Peak	Spacewatch	·	2.2 km	MPC · JPL
257649	1999 TP_{319}	—	October 9, 1999	Kitt Peak	Spacewatch	·	2.8 km	MPC · JPL
257650	1999 TL_{321}	—	October 12, 1999	Kitt Peak	Spacewatch	·	970 m	MPC · JPL
257651	1999 UZ_{11}	—	October 29, 1999	Kitt Peak	Spacewatch	·	4.0 km	MPC · JPL
257652	1999 UZ_{28}	—	October 31, 1999	Kitt Peak	Spacewatch	ELF	5.2 km	MPC · JPL
257653	1999 UV_{31}	—	October 31, 1999	Kitt Peak	Spacewatch	MAS	690 m	MPC · JPL
257654	1999 UT_{33}	—	October 31, 1999	Kitt Peak	Spacewatch	·	1.1 km	MPC · JPL
257655	1999 UM_{36}	—	October 16, 1999	Kitt Peak	Spacewatch	·	3.5 km	MPC · JPL
257656	1999 UY_{47}	—	October 30, 1999	Catalina	CSS	·	1.3 km	MPC · JPL
257657	1999 VE	—	November 1, 1999	Olathe	Olathe	·	1.2 km	MPC · JPL
257658	1999 VJ_{29}	—	November 3, 1999	Socorro	LINEAR	·	2.5 km	MPC · JPL
257659	1999 VE_{32}	—	November 3, 1999	Socorro	LINEAR	TIR	3.8 km	MPC · JPL
257660	1999 VS_{39}	—	November 11, 1999	Kitt Peak	Spacewatch	·	1.6 km	MPC · JPL
257661	1999 VP_{40}	—	November 1, 1999	Kitt Peak	Spacewatch	NYS	1.0 km	MPC · JPL
257662	1999 VC_{43}	—	November 4, 1999	Kitt Peak	Spacewatch	EOS	2.9 km	MPC · JPL
257663	1999 VQ_{45}	—	November 4, 1999	Catalina	CSS	NYS	1.4 km	MPC · JPL
257664	1999 VO_{46}	—	November 3, 1999	Socorro	LINEAR	H	690 m	MPC · JPL
257665	1999 VA_{51}	—	November 3, 1999	Socorro	LINEAR	·	2.1 km	MPC · JPL
257666	1999 VC_{62}	—	November 4, 1999	Socorro	LINEAR	·	2.6 km	MPC · JPL
257667	1999 VL_{65}	—	November 4, 1999	Socorro	LINEAR	·	1.3 km	MPC · JPL
257668	1999 VU_{70}	—	November 4, 1999	Socorro	LINEAR	·	1.4 km	MPC · JPL
257669	1999 VV_{75}	—	November 5, 1999	Kitt Peak	Spacewatch	·	1.3 km	MPC · JPL
257670	1999 VC_{86}	—	November 4, 1999	Socorro	LINEAR	·	1.6 km	MPC · JPL
257671	1999 VV_{103}	—	November 9, 1999	Socorro	LINEAR	·	1.3 km	MPC · JPL
257672	1999 VJ_{104}	—	November 9, 1999	Socorro	LINEAR	NYS	1.4 km	MPC · JPL
257673	1999 VK_{106}	—	November 9, 1999	Socorro	LINEAR	·	1.1 km	MPC · JPL
257674	1999 VM_{122}	—	November 4, 1999	Kitt Peak	Spacewatch	·	3.5 km	MPC · JPL
257675	1999 VO_{122}	—	November 4, 1999	Kitt Peak	Spacewatch	·	2.8 km	MPC · JPL
257676	1999 VQ_{125}	—	November 6, 1999	Kitt Peak	Spacewatch	THM	2.7 km	MPC · JPL
257677	1999 VY_{125}	—	November 9, 1999	Kitt Peak	Spacewatch	NYS	1.5 km	MPC · JPL
257678	1999 VV_{129}	—	November 11, 1999	Kitt Peak	Spacewatch	·	2.7 km	MPC · JPL
257679	1999 VJ_{132}	—	November 9, 1999	Kitt Peak	Spacewatch	·	3.1 km	MPC · JPL
257680	1999 VR_{134}	—	November 10, 1999	Kitt Peak	Spacewatch	MAS	850 m	MPC · JPL
257681	1999 VG_{136}	—	November 9, 1999	Socorro	LINEAR	·	2.7 km	MPC · JPL
257682	1999 VC_{150}	—	November 14, 1999	Socorro	LINEAR	·	3.9 km	MPC · JPL
257683	1999 VW_{150}	—	November 14, 1999	Socorro	LINEAR	EOS	2.7 km	MPC · JPL
257684	1999 VT_{158}	—	November 14, 1999	Socorro	LINEAR	·	1.8 km	MPC · JPL
257685	1999 VW_{164}	—	November 14, 1999	Socorro	LINEAR	·	5.0 km	MPC · JPL
257686	1999 VS_{166}	—	November 14, 1999	Socorro	LINEAR	·	1.4 km	MPC · JPL
257687	1999 VL_{182}	—	November 9, 1999	Socorro	LINEAR	·	880 m	MPC · JPL
257688	1999 VW_{187}	—	November 15, 1999	Socorro	LINEAR	·	3.7 km	MPC · JPL
257689	1999 VQ_{197}	—	November 3, 1999	Catalina	CSS	·	4.3 km	MPC · JPL
257690	1999 VY_{205}	—	November 12, 1999	Socorro	LINEAR	MAS	760 m	MPC · JPL
257691	1999 VC_{210}	—	November 12, 1999	Socorro	LINEAR	V	770 m	MPC · JPL
257692	1999 WT_{8}	—	November 28, 1999	Gnosca	S. Sposetti	·	2.3 km	MPC · JPL
257693	1999 WQ_{12}	—	November 29, 1999	Kitt Peak	Spacewatch	·	1.2 km	MPC · JPL
257694	1999 WU_{13}	—	November 28, 1999	Kitt Peak	Spacewatch	·	940 m	MPC · JPL
257695	1999 WY_{13}	—	November 28, 1999	Kitt Peak	Spacewatch	THM	2.2 km	MPC · JPL
257696	1999 WV_{19}	—	November 16, 1999	Kitt Peak	Spacewatch	·	4.5 km	MPC · JPL
257697	1999 WC_{21}	—	November 16, 1999	Kitt Peak	Spacewatch	THM	2.7 km	MPC · JPL
257698	1999 WO_{23}	—	November 17, 1999	Kitt Peak	Spacewatch	·	1.8 km	MPC · JPL
257699	1999 WR_{23}	—	November 17, 1999	Kitt Peak	Spacewatch	HYG	3.2 km	MPC · JPL
257700	1999 WW_{25}	—	November 29, 1999	Kitt Peak	Spacewatch	VER	4.0 km	MPC · JPL

== 257701–257800 ==
back to top

Designation			Discovery			Properties		Ref
Permanent	Provisional	Named after	Date	Site	Discoverer(s)	Category	Diam.	Ref
257701	1999 XK_{4}	—	December 4, 1999	Catalina	CSS	·	1.4 km	MPC · JPL
257702	1999 XR_{20}	—	December 5, 1999	Socorro	LINEAR	·	1.4 km	MPC · JPL
257703	1999 XY_{43}	—	December 7, 1999	Socorro	LINEAR	·	1.4 km	MPC · JPL
257704	1999 XK_{45}	—	December 7, 1999	Socorro	LINEAR	NYS	1.2 km	MPC · JPL
257705	1999 XY_{50}	—	December 7, 1999	Socorro	LINEAR	NYS	1.3 km	MPC · JPL
257706	1999 XX_{62}	—	December 7, 1999	Socorro	LINEAR	·	4.9 km	MPC · JPL
257707	1999 XF_{80}	—	December 7, 1999	Socorro	LINEAR	·	1.5 km	MPC · JPL
257708	1999 XN_{80}	—	December 7, 1999	Socorro	LINEAR	·	1.7 km	MPC · JPL
257709	1999 XE_{112}	—	December 7, 1999	Socorro	LINEAR	·	1.7 km	MPC · JPL
257710	1999 XD_{115}	—	December 12, 1999	Prescott	P. G. Comba	NYS	1.4 km	MPC · JPL
257711	1999 XH_{116}	—	December 5, 1999	Catalina	CSS	·	2.3 km	MPC · JPL
257712	1999 XG_{123}	—	December 7, 1999	Catalina	CSS	·	1.5 km	MPC · JPL
257713	1999 XL_{138}	—	December 4, 1999	Kitt Peak	Spacewatch	·	4.2 km	MPC · JPL
257714	1999 XJ_{140}	—	December 2, 1999	Kitt Peak	Spacewatch	·	3.4 km	MPC · JPL
257715	1999 XT_{141}	—	December 10, 1999	Socorro	LINEAR	H	1.0 km	MPC · JPL
257716	1999 XQ_{142}	—	December 12, 1999	Socorro	LINEAR	PHO	1.6 km	MPC · JPL
257717	1999 XZ_{149}	—	December 8, 1999	Kitt Peak	Spacewatch	NYS	1.3 km	MPC · JPL
257718	1999 XY_{150}	—	December 8, 1999	Kitt Peak	Spacewatch	·	2.7 km	MPC · JPL
257719	1999 XO_{154}	—	December 8, 1999	Socorro	LINEAR	TIR	4.7 km	MPC · JPL
257720	1999 XF_{217}	—	December 13, 1999	Kitt Peak	Spacewatch	THM	2.0 km	MPC · JPL
257721	1999 XP_{218}	—	December 13, 1999	Kitt Peak	Spacewatch	·	1.8 km	MPC · JPL
257722	1999 XD_{219}	—	December 15, 1999	Kitt Peak	Spacewatch	·	1.4 km	MPC · JPL
257723	1999 XE_{224}	—	December 13, 1999	Kitt Peak	Spacewatch	·	1.5 km	MPC · JPL
257724	1999 XP_{226}	—	December 14, 1999	Kitt Peak	Spacewatch	·	3.4 km	MPC · JPL
257725	1999 XE_{233}	—	December 2, 1999	Anderson Mesa	LONEOS	·	2.9 km	MPC · JPL
257726	1999 XB_{249}	—	December 6, 1999	Socorro	LINEAR	·	4.5 km	MPC · JPL
257727	1999 XU_{252}	—	December 12, 1999	Kitt Peak	Spacewatch	·	1.7 km	MPC · JPL
257728	1999 XG_{258}	—	December 8, 1999	Kitt Peak	Spacewatch	·	1.3 km	MPC · JPL
257729	1999 XC_{259}	—	December 7, 1999	Socorro	LINEAR	NYS	1.1 km	MPC · JPL
257730	1999 XM_{259}	—	December 5, 1999	Kitt Peak	Spacewatch	·	4.0 km	MPC · JPL
257731	1999 YG_{5}	—	December 27, 1999	Oizumi	T. Kobayashi	·	2.4 km	MPC · JPL
257732	1999 YE_{6}	—	December 30, 1999	Socorro	LINEAR	PHO	1.4 km	MPC · JPL
257733	1999 YH_{12}	—	December 27, 1999	Kitt Peak	Spacewatch	·	5.2 km	MPC · JPL
257734	1999 YF_{21}	—	December 30, 1999	Mauna Kea	Veillet, C.	·	1.5 km	MPC · JPL
257735	1999 YP_{26}	—	December 30, 1999	Socorro	LINEAR	·	2.0 km	MPC · JPL
257736	2000 AF_{43}	—	January 5, 2000	Socorro	LINEAR	·	5.8 km	MPC · JPL
257737	2000 AY_{48}	—	January 5, 2000	Socorro	LINEAR	·	2.0 km	MPC · JPL
257738	2000 AA_{49}	—	January 5, 2000	Socorro	LINEAR	H	980 m	MPC · JPL
257739	2000 AU_{54}	—	January 4, 2000	Socorro	LINEAR	LIX	6.0 km	MPC · JPL
257740	2000 AZ_{131}	—	January 3, 2000	Socorro	LINEAR	·	1.7 km	MPC · JPL
257741	2000 AE_{150}	—	January 7, 2000	Socorro	LINEAR	·	3.3 km	MPC · JPL
257742	2000 AE_{151}	—	January 10, 2000	Prescott	P. G. Comba	·	3.7 km	MPC · JPL
257743	2000 AY_{183}	—	January 7, 2000	Socorro	LINEAR	(1118)	6.0 km	MPC · JPL
257744	2000 AD_{205}	—	January 8, 2000	Anderson Mesa	LONEOS	APO	670 m	MPC · JPL
257745	2000 AA_{209}	—	January 4, 2000	Kitt Peak	Spacewatch	·	1.6 km	MPC · JPL
257746	2000 AC_{212}	—	January 5, 2000	Kitt Peak	Spacewatch	·	1.7 km	MPC · JPL
257747	2000 AZ_{218}	—	January 8, 2000	Kitt Peak	Spacewatch	·	3.3 km	MPC · JPL
257748	2000 AB_{221}	—	January 8, 2000	Kitt Peak	Spacewatch	·	3.0 km	MPC · JPL
257749	2000 AT_{227}	—	January 10, 2000	Kitt Peak	Spacewatch	·	1.4 km	MPC · JPL
257750	2000 BN	—	January 24, 2000	Višnjan	K. Korlević	NYS	1.6 km	MPC · JPL
257751	2000 BT_{1}	—	January 27, 2000	Kitt Peak	Spacewatch	·	1.7 km	MPC · JPL
257752	2000 BZ_{12}	—	January 28, 2000	Kitt Peak	Spacewatch	·	3.0 km	MPC · JPL
257753	2000 BB_{14}	—	January 28, 2000	Uenohara	N. Kawasato	·	2.1 km	MPC · JPL
257754	2000 BP_{17}	—	January 30, 2000	Socorro	LINEAR	·	1.5 km	MPC · JPL
257755	2000 BY_{19}	—	January 26, 2000	Kitt Peak	Spacewatch	THM	2.7 km	MPC · JPL
257756	2000 BP_{21}	—	January 29, 2000	Kitt Peak	Spacewatch	·	6.1 km	MPC · JPL
257757	2000 BG_{28}	—	January 31, 2000	Socorro	LINEAR	·	1.7 km	MPC · JPL
257758	2000 BJ_{28}	—	January 31, 2000	Socorro	LINEAR	·	4.5 km	MPC · JPL
257759	2000 BT_{31}	—	January 27, 2000	Kitt Peak	Spacewatch	EOS	3.1 km	MPC · JPL
257760	2000 BA_{37}	—	January 30, 2000	Kitt Peak	Spacewatch	·	2.0 km	MPC · JPL
257761	2000 BG_{37}	—	January 26, 2000	Kitt Peak	Spacewatch	·	4.2 km	MPC · JPL
257762	2000 BV_{39}	—	January 27, 2000	Kitt Peak	Spacewatch	·	3.0 km	MPC · JPL
257763	2000 BK_{50}	—	January 16, 2000	Kitt Peak	Spacewatch	·	1.4 km	MPC · JPL
257764	2000 BD_{52}	—	January 27, 2000	Kitt Peak	Spacewatch	·	3.8 km	MPC · JPL
257765	2000 CX_{33}	—	February 4, 2000	Višnjan	K. Korlević	·	4.6 km	MPC · JPL
257766	2000 CN_{41}	—	February 2, 2000	Socorro	LINEAR	·	5.6 km	MPC · JPL
257767	2000 CZ_{68}	—	February 1, 2000	Kitt Peak	Spacewatch	·	2.9 km	MPC · JPL
257768	2000 CB_{74}	—	February 7, 2000	Kitt Peak	Spacewatch	MAS	1.0 km	MPC · JPL
257769	2000 CV_{83}	—	February 4, 2000	Socorro	LINEAR	EUN	1.8 km	MPC · JPL
257770	2000 CA_{98}	—	February 7, 2000	Kitt Peak	Spacewatch	·	3.6 km	MPC · JPL
257771	2000 CB_{99}	—	February 8, 2000	Kitt Peak	Spacewatch	·	1.3 km	MPC · JPL
257772	2000 CN_{109}	—	February 5, 2000	Kitt Peak	M. W. Buie	·	1.2 km	MPC · JPL
257773	2000 CB_{111}	—	February 6, 2000	Kitt Peak	M. W. Buie	·	1.0 km	MPC · JPL
257774	2000 CT_{119}	—	February 7, 2000	Kitt Peak	Spacewatch	·	1.5 km	MPC · JPL
257775	2000 CW_{129}	—	February 3, 2000	Kitt Peak	Spacewatch	L4	7.7 km	MPC · JPL
257776	2000 CT_{130}	—	February 1, 2000	Kitt Peak	Spacewatch	·	3.2 km	MPC · JPL
257777	2000 CB_{137}	—	February 4, 2000	Kitt Peak	Spacewatch	·	1.5 km	MPC · JPL
257778	2000 DN_{9}	—	February 26, 2000	Kitt Peak	Spacewatch	MAS	880 m	MPC · JPL
257779	2000 DL_{12}	—	February 27, 2000	Kitt Peak	Spacewatch	MAS	1.0 km	MPC · JPL
257780	2000 DO_{23}	—	February 29, 2000	Socorro	LINEAR	·	2.5 km	MPC · JPL
257781	2000 DK_{28}	—	February 29, 2000	Socorro	LINEAR	·	1.5 km	MPC · JPL
257782	2000 DJ_{31}	—	February 29, 2000	Socorro	LINEAR	MAS	960 m	MPC · JPL
257783	2000 DJ_{41}	—	February 29, 2000	Socorro	LINEAR	·	1.5 km	MPC · JPL
257784	2000 DB_{43}	—	February 29, 2000	Socorro	LINEAR	V	1.1 km	MPC · JPL
257785	2000 DU_{49}	—	February 29, 2000	Socorro	LINEAR	·	2.0 km	MPC · JPL
257786	2000 DG_{59}	—	February 29, 2000	Socorro	LINEAR	·	5.2 km	MPC · JPL
257787	2000 DT_{64}	—	February 29, 2000	Socorro	LINEAR	·	1.5 km	MPC · JPL
257788	2000 DJ_{76}	—	February 29, 2000	Socorro	LINEAR	·	3.0 km	MPC · JPL
257789	2000 DA_{77}	—	February 29, 2000	Socorro	LINEAR	PHO	1.5 km	MPC · JPL
257790	2000 DV_{90}	—	February 27, 2000	Kitt Peak	Spacewatch	NYS	1.4 km	MPC · JPL
257791	2000 DT_{105}	—	February 29, 2000	Socorro	LINEAR	·	1.7 km	MPC · JPL
257792	2000 EZ_{1}	—	March 3, 2000	Socorro	LINEAR	·	1.5 km	MPC · JPL
257793	2000 EV_{2}	—	March 3, 2000	Socorro	LINEAR	·	1.4 km	MPC · JPL
257794	2000 EB_{7}	—	March 3, 2000	Kitt Peak	Spacewatch	NYS	1.2 km	MPC · JPL
257795	2000 EA_{13}	—	March 4, 2000	Socorro	LINEAR	·	1.6 km	MPC · JPL
257796	2000 EQ_{21}	—	March 4, 2000	Socorro	LINEAR	·	3.5 km	MPC · JPL
257797	2000 EX_{22}	—	March 3, 2000	Kitt Peak	Spacewatch	·	1.2 km	MPC · JPL
257798	2000 EN_{23}	—	March 8, 2000	Kitt Peak	Spacewatch	·	1.4 km	MPC · JPL
257799	2000 EG_{24}	—	March 8, 2000	Kitt Peak	Spacewatch	·	1.6 km	MPC · JPL
257800	2000 EO_{35}	—	March 8, 2000	Socorro	LINEAR	MAS	1.1 km	MPC · JPL

== 257801–257900 ==
back to top

Designation			Discovery			Properties		Ref
Permanent	Provisional	Named after	Date	Site	Discoverer(s)	Category	Diam.	Ref
257801	2000 EC_{66}	—	March 10, 2000	Socorro	LINEAR	·	1.6 km	MPC · JPL
257802	2000 EO_{71}	—	March 9, 2000	Kitt Peak	Spacewatch	MAS	950 m	MPC · JPL
257803	2000 EC_{75}	—	March 5, 2000	Socorro	LINEAR	·	2.7 km	MPC · JPL
257804	2000 ED_{78}	—	March 5, 2000	Socorro	LINEAR	·	1.8 km	MPC · JPL
257805	2000 EO_{108}	—	March 8, 2000	Haleakala	NEAT	·	5.7 km	MPC · JPL
257806	2000 EC_{138}	—	March 11, 2000	Socorro	LINEAR	·	1.5 km	MPC · JPL
257807	2000 EK_{139}	—	March 11, 2000	Socorro	LINEAR	·	1.9 km	MPC · JPL
257808	2000 EA_{165}	—	March 3, 2000	Socorro	LINEAR	·	1.4 km	MPC · JPL
257809	2000 FB_{5}	—	March 27, 2000	Kitt Peak	Spacewatch	·	1.4 km	MPC · JPL
257810	2000 FX_{12}	—	March 29, 2000	Socorro	LINEAR	·	2.4 km	MPC · JPL
257811	2000 FZ_{18}	—	March 29, 2000	Socorro	LINEAR	·	2.9 km	MPC · JPL
257812	2000 FC_{21}	—	March 29, 2000	Socorro	LINEAR	·	2.3 km	MPC · JPL
257813	2000 FU_{25}	—	March 27, 2000	Anderson Mesa	LONEOS	·	2.5 km	MPC · JPL
257814	2000 FP_{41}	—	March 29, 2000	Socorro	LINEAR	·	1.6 km	MPC · JPL
257815	2000 GQ_{23}	—	April 5, 2000	Socorro	LINEAR	MIS	2.7 km	MPC · JPL
257816	2000 GP_{27}	—	April 5, 2000	Socorro	LINEAR	·	1.4 km	MPC · JPL
257817	2000 GS_{36}	—	April 5, 2000	Socorro	LINEAR	·	1.8 km	MPC · JPL
257818	2000 GB_{42}	—	April 5, 2000	Socorro	LINEAR	·	1.5 km	MPC · JPL
257819	2000 GJ_{51}	—	April 5, 2000	Socorro	LINEAR	·	1.3 km	MPC · JPL
257820	2000 GU_{84}	—	April 3, 2000	Socorro	LINEAR	T_{j} (2.99)	6.3 km	MPC · JPL
257821	2000 GB_{122}	—	April 6, 2000	Kitt Peak	Spacewatch	ADE	2.5 km	MPC · JPL
257822	2000 GC_{132}	—	April 10, 2000	Kitt Peak	Spacewatch	·	2.9 km	MPC · JPL
257823	2000 GN_{143}	—	April 7, 2000	Anderson Mesa	LONEOS	·	2.1 km	MPC · JPL
257824	2000 GA_{144}	—	April 6, 2000	Kitt Peak	Spacewatch	·	1.9 km	MPC · JPL
257825	2000 GR_{151}	—	April 5, 2000	Socorro	LINEAR	·	2.1 km	MPC · JPL
257826	2000 GQ_{155}	—	April 6, 2000	Anderson Mesa	LONEOS	NYS	1.4 km	MPC · JPL
257827	2000 GY_{168}	—	April 4, 2000	Socorro	LINEAR	·	2.8 km	MPC · JPL
257828	2000 GW_{177}	—	April 4, 2000	Socorro	LINEAR	·	1.7 km	MPC · JPL
257829	2000 GK_{183}	—	April 3, 2000	Kitt Peak	Spacewatch	·	1.5 km	MPC · JPL
257830	2000 HX_{13}	—	April 28, 2000	Socorro	LINEAR	JUN	1.6 km	MPC · JPL
257831	2000 HC_{23}	—	April 30, 2000	Socorro	LINEAR	·	1.8 km	MPC · JPL
257832	2000 HM_{54}	—	April 29, 2000	Socorro	LINEAR	·	2.9 km	MPC · JPL
257833	2000 HR_{105}	—	April 24, 2000	Anderson Mesa	LONEOS	·	1.5 km	MPC · JPL
257834	2000 JW_{2}	—	May 3, 2000	Socorro	LINEAR	·	2.0 km	MPC · JPL
257835	2000 JR_{18}	—	May 3, 2000	Socorro	LINEAR	·	2.5 km	MPC · JPL
257836	2000 JQ_{34}	—	May 7, 2000	Socorro	LINEAR	·	1.7 km	MPC · JPL
257837	2000 JS_{44}	—	May 7, 2000	Socorro	LINEAR	·	2.1 km	MPC · JPL
257838	2000 JQ_{66}	—	May 11, 2000	Socorro	LINEAR	AMO +1km	890 m	MPC · JPL
257839	2000 JQ_{90}	—	May 4, 2000	Apache Point	SDSS	CYB	4.9 km	MPC · JPL
257840	2000 KY_{6}	—	May 27, 2000	Socorro	LINEAR	·	2.6 km	MPC · JPL
257841	2000 KB_{11}	—	May 28, 2000	Socorro	LINEAR	·	1.9 km	MPC · JPL
257842	2000 KO_{37}	—	May 24, 2000	Kitt Peak	Spacewatch	·	1.9 km	MPC · JPL
257843	2000 KR_{43}	—	May 28, 2000	Kitt Peak	Spacewatch	·	3.0 km	MPC · JPL
257844	2000 KQ_{44}	—	May 31, 2000	Ondřejov	P. Kušnirák, P. Pravec	·	2.3 km	MPC · JPL
257845	2000 KK_{59}	—	May 25, 2000	Kitt Peak	Spacewatch	·	2.0 km	MPC · JPL
257846	2000 LK_{22}	—	June 6, 2000	Kitt Peak	Spacewatch	·	2.7 km	MPC · JPL
257847	2000 LE_{34}	—	June 3, 2000	Kitt Peak	Spacewatch	WIT	1.2 km	MPC · JPL
257848	2000 MJ	—	June 24, 2000	Tebbutt	F. B. Zoltowski	EUN	2.0 km	MPC · JPL
257849	2000 NH	—	July 2, 2000	Kitt Peak	Spacewatch	·	1.3 km	MPC · JPL
257850	2000 NZ_{6}	—	July 4, 2000	Kitt Peak	Spacewatch	GEF	1.7 km	MPC · JPL
257851	2000 OA_{13}	—	July 23, 2000	Socorro	LINEAR	·	880 m	MPC · JPL
257852	2000 OF_{36}	—	July 24, 2000	Socorro	LINEAR	·	4.2 km	MPC · JPL
257853	2000 OH_{54}	—	July 29, 2000	Anderson Mesa	LONEOS	(32418)	3.5 km	MPC · JPL
257854	2000 PG_{8}	—	August 4, 2000	Socorro	LINEAR	·	3.9 km	MPC · JPL
257855	2000 QR_{136}	—	August 29, 2000	Socorro	LINEAR	DOR	3.4 km	MPC · JPL
257856	2000 QN_{148}	—	August 27, 2000	Kvistaberg	Uppsala-DLR Asteroid Survey	DOR	2.8 km	MPC · JPL
257857	2000 QV_{156}	—	August 31, 2000	Socorro	LINEAR	·	3.8 km	MPC · JPL
257858	2000 QK_{178}	—	August 31, 2000	Socorro	LINEAR	·	1.0 km	MPC · JPL
257859	2000 QB_{186}	—	August 26, 2000	Socorro	LINEAR	·	1.1 km	MPC · JPL
257860	2000 QE_{230}	—	August 31, 2000	Socorro	LINEAR	V	980 m	MPC · JPL
257861	2000 QD_{242}	—	August 27, 2000	Cerro Tololo	M. W. Buie	·	730 m	MPC · JPL
257862	2000 QC_{248}	—	August 28, 2000	Cerro Tololo	M. W. Buie	·	830 m	MPC · JPL
257863	2000 RM_{14}	—	September 1, 2000	Socorro	LINEAR	·	3.9 km	MPC · JPL
257864	2000 RQ_{69}	—	September 2, 2000	Socorro	LINEAR	GEF	2.3 km	MPC · JPL
257865	2000 RN_{84}	—	September 2, 2000	Anderson Mesa	LONEOS	·	860 m	MPC · JPL
257866	2000 SF_{15}	—	September 23, 2000	Socorro	LINEAR	·	4.1 km	MPC · JPL
257867	2000 SY_{27}	—	September 23, 2000	Socorro	LINEAR	·	3.6 km	MPC · JPL
257868	2000 SH_{30}	—	September 24, 2000	Socorro	LINEAR	·	3.2 km	MPC · JPL
257869	2000 SD_{32}	—	September 24, 2000	Socorro	LINEAR	·	1 km	MPC · JPL
257870	2000 SY_{34}	—	September 24, 2000	Socorro	LINEAR	·	800 m	MPC · JPL
257871	2000 SX_{44}	—	September 26, 2000	Ondřejov	P. Kušnirák	·	4.0 km	MPC · JPL
257872	2000 SY_{52}	—	September 24, 2000	Socorro	LINEAR	·	2.9 km	MPC · JPL
257873	2000 SP_{60}	—	September 24, 2000	Socorro	LINEAR	DOR	3.4 km	MPC · JPL
257874	2000 SK_{93}	—	September 23, 2000	Socorro	LINEAR	·	800 m	MPC · JPL
257875	2000 SL_{97}	—	September 23, 2000	Socorro	LINEAR	·	1.1 km	MPC · JPL
257876	2000 SH_{131}	—	September 22, 2000	Socorro	LINEAR	·	2.8 km	MPC · JPL
257877	2000 SF_{136}	—	September 23, 2000	Socorro	LINEAR	·	4.6 km	MPC · JPL
257878	2000 SM_{143}	—	September 23, 2000	Socorro	LINEAR	(32418)	2.7 km	MPC · JPL
257879	2000 SJ_{153}	—	September 24, 2000	Socorro	LINEAR	·	3.4 km	MPC · JPL
257880	2000 SV_{157}	—	September 27, 2000	Socorro	LINEAR	·	3.0 km	MPC · JPL
257881	2000 SE_{158}	—	September 27, 2000	Socorro	LINEAR	·	900 m	MPC · JPL
257882	2000 SK_{192}	—	September 24, 2000	Socorro	LINEAR	BRA	1.4 km	MPC · JPL
257883	2000 SM_{214}	—	September 26, 2000	Socorro	LINEAR	·	940 m	MPC · JPL
257884	2000 SA_{228}	—	September 28, 2000	Socorro	LINEAR	·	3.8 km	MPC · JPL
257885	2000 SU_{256}	—	September 24, 2000	Socorro	LINEAR	·	2.9 km	MPC · JPL
257886	2000 SC_{263}	—	September 25, 2000	Socorro	LINEAR	·	2.6 km	MPC · JPL
257887	2000 SU_{282}	—	September 23, 2000	Socorro	LINEAR	·	2.7 km	MPC · JPL
257888	2000 SY_{290}	—	September 27, 2000	Socorro	LINEAR	·	770 m	MPC · JPL
257889	2000 SD_{292}	—	September 27, 2000	Socorro	LINEAR	V	810 m	MPC · JPL
257890	2000 SE_{292}	—	September 27, 2000	Socorro	LINEAR	·	690 m	MPC · JPL
257891	2000 SJ_{315}	—	September 28, 2000	Socorro	LINEAR	·	3.7 km	MPC · JPL
257892	2000 SK_{339}	—	September 25, 2000	Haleakala	NEAT	·	1.0 km	MPC · JPL
257893	2000 SN_{340}	—	September 24, 2000	Socorro	LINEAR	·	1.0 km	MPC · JPL
257894	2000 SF_{351}	—	September 29, 2000	Anderson Mesa	LONEOS	·	1.1 km	MPC · JPL
257895	2000 SL_{370}	—	September 24, 2000	Anderson Mesa	LONEOS	·	1.0 km	MPC · JPL
257896	2000 TL_{3}	—	October 1, 2000	Socorro	LINEAR	KOR	2.0 km	MPC · JPL
257897	2000 TW_{3}	—	October 1, 2000	Socorro	LINEAR	·	2.7 km	MPC · JPL
257898	2000 TX_{23}	—	October 2, 2000	Socorro	LINEAR	·	840 m	MPC · JPL
257899	2000 TR_{27}	—	October 3, 2000	Socorro	LINEAR	L5	10 km	MPC · JPL
257900	2000 TZ_{33}	—	October 4, 2000	Bergisch Gladbach	W. Bickel	·	2.4 km	MPC · JPL

== 257901–258000 ==
back to top

Designation			Discovery			Properties		Ref
Permanent	Provisional	Named after	Date	Site	Discoverer(s)	Category	Diam.	Ref
257901	2000 TC_{37}	—	October 1, 2000	Socorro	LINEAR	·	1.1 km	MPC · JPL
257902	2000 TS_{41}	—	October 1, 2000	Socorro	LINEAR	·	1.1 km	MPC · JPL
257903	2000 TM_{54}	—	October 1, 2000	Socorro	LINEAR	·	950 m	MPC · JPL
257904	2000 UZ_{19}	—	October 24, 2000	Socorro	LINEAR	·	1.0 km	MPC · JPL
257905	2000 UP_{55}	—	October 24, 2000	Socorro	LINEAR	·	1.2 km	MPC · JPL
257906	2000 UD_{67}	—	October 25, 2000	Socorro	LINEAR	EOS	3.1 km	MPC · JPL
257907	2000 UY_{75}	—	October 24, 2000	Socorro	LINEAR	H	710 m	MPC · JPL
257908	2000 UB_{84}	—	October 31, 2000	Socorro	LINEAR	(16286)	2.7 km	MPC · JPL
257909	2000 UQ_{97}	—	October 25, 2000	Socorro	LINEAR	·	6.0 km	MPC · JPL
257910	2000 UV_{105}	—	October 29, 2000	Socorro	LINEAR	·	2.5 km	MPC · JPL
257911	2000 VV_{1}	—	November 1, 2000	Socorro	LINEAR	PHO	2.0 km	MPC · JPL
257912	2000 VF_{9}	—	November 1, 2000	Socorro	LINEAR	·	4.5 km	MPC · JPL
257913	2000 VZ_{12}	—	November 1, 2000	Socorro	LINEAR	·	2.9 km	MPC · JPL
257914	2000 VX_{21}	—	November 1, 2000	Socorro	LINEAR	·	1.0 km	MPC · JPL
257915	2000 VU_{48}	—	November 2, 2000	Socorro	LINEAR	·	1.2 km	MPC · JPL
257916	2000 VC_{56}	—	November 3, 2000	Socorro	LINEAR	·	5.8 km	MPC · JPL
257917	2000 VN_{62}	—	November 3, 2000	Socorro	LINEAR	V	830 m	MPC · JPL
257918	2000 WR	—	November 16, 2000	Socorro	LINEAR	EUP	5.9 km	MPC · JPL
257919	2000 WZ_{12}	—	November 20, 2000	Socorro	LINEAR	H	590 m	MPC · JPL
257920	2000 WT_{27}	—	November 25, 2000	Kitt Peak	Spacewatch	·	2.1 km	MPC · JPL
257921	2000 WA_{29}	—	November 26, 2000	Socorro	LINEAR	H	580 m	MPC · JPL
257922	2000 WK_{30}	—	November 20, 2000	Socorro	LINEAR	·	1.0 km	MPC · JPL
257923	2000 WS_{39}	—	November 20, 2000	Socorro	LINEAR	·	2.9 km	MPC · JPL
257924	2000 WH_{68}	—	November 29, 2000	Kitt Peak	Spacewatch	·	710 m	MPC · JPL
257925	2000 WK_{68}	—	November 29, 2000	Haleakala	NEAT	TIR	4.6 km	MPC · JPL
257926	2000 WY_{72}	—	November 20, 2000	Socorro	LINEAR	·	1.2 km	MPC · JPL
257927	2000 WV_{76}	—	November 20, 2000	Socorro	LINEAR	·	3.5 km	MPC · JPL
257928	2000 WL_{96}	—	November 21, 2000	Socorro	LINEAR	·	1.5 km	MPC · JPL
257929	2000 WR_{128}	—	November 18, 2000	Kitt Peak	Spacewatch	·	2.0 km	MPC · JPL
257930	2000 WE_{134}	—	November 19, 2000	Socorro	LINEAR	·	5.9 km	MPC · JPL
257931	2000 WZ_{152}	—	November 29, 2000	Socorro	LINEAR	·	3.9 km	MPC · JPL
257932	2000 WH_{156}	—	November 30, 2000	Socorro	LINEAR	·	3.4 km	MPC · JPL
257933	2000 WB_{160}	—	November 20, 2000	Anderson Mesa	LONEOS	·	790 m	MPC · JPL
257934	2000 WC_{176}	—	November 26, 2000	Kitt Peak	Spacewatch	·	1.0 km	MPC · JPL
257935	2000 WK_{182}	—	November 25, 2000	Socorro	LINEAR	·	6.2 km	MPC · JPL
257936	2000 WL_{182}	—	November 26, 2000	Anderson Mesa	LONEOS	·	6.2 km	MPC · JPL
257937	2000 WC_{184}	—	November 30, 2000	Anderson Mesa	LONEOS	·	5.0 km	MPC · JPL
257938	2000 WS_{184}	—	November 30, 2000	Kitt Peak	Spacewatch	·	3.5 km	MPC · JPL
257939	2000 WZ_{184}	—	November 29, 2000	Socorro	LINEAR	·	3.1 km	MPC · JPL
257940	2000 WL_{185}	—	November 29, 2000	Socorro	LINEAR	H	680 m	MPC · JPL
257941	2000 XB_{2}	—	December 1, 2000	Socorro	LINEAR	PHO	1.7 km	MPC · JPL
257942	2000 XN_{15}	—	December 4, 2000	Prescott	P. G. Comba	·	760 m	MPC · JPL
257943	2000 XL_{26}	—	December 4, 2000	Socorro	LINEAR	·	3.8 km	MPC · JPL
257944	2000 XQ_{53}	—	December 14, 2000	Bohyunsan	Bohyunsan	·	1.1 km	MPC · JPL
257945	2000 YC_{12}	—	December 22, 2000	Ondřejov	P. Kušnirák	·	4.7 km	MPC · JPL
257946	2000 YJ_{15}	—	December 23, 2000	Kitt Peak	Spacewatch	L4	20 km	MPC · JPL
257947	2000 YT_{27}	—	December 30, 2000	Kitt Peak	Spacewatch	THM	2.5 km	MPC · JPL
257948	2000 YJ_{28}	—	December 26, 2000	Haleakala	NEAT	PHO	1.5 km	MPC · JPL
257949	2000 YX_{50}	—	December 30, 2000	Socorro	LINEAR	·	3.1 km	MPC · JPL
257950	2000 YV_{57}	—	December 30, 2000	Socorro	LINEAR	·	1.4 km	MPC · JPL
257951	2000 YP_{111}	—	December 30, 2000	Socorro	LINEAR	·	5.9 km	MPC · JPL
257952	2000 YK_{113}	—	December 30, 2000	Socorro	LINEAR	·	2.2 km	MPC · JPL
257953	2000 YN_{119}	—	December 17, 2000	Kitt Peak	Spacewatch	·	1.6 km	MPC · JPL
257954	2000 YY_{141}	—	December 20, 2000	Kitt Peak	Deep Lens Survey	·	1.0 km	MPC · JPL
257955	2001 AW_{9}	—	January 2, 2001	Socorro	LINEAR	·	1.4 km	MPC · JPL
257956	2001 AR_{41}	—	January 3, 2001	Socorro	LINEAR	·	6.5 km	MPC · JPL
257957	2001 AY_{45}	—	January 7, 2001	Socorro	LINEAR	PHO	1.2 km	MPC · JPL
257958	2001 AQ_{51}	—	January 15, 2001	Kitt Peak	Spacewatch	·	3.0 km	MPC · JPL
257959	2001 BS_{6}	—	January 19, 2001	Socorro	LINEAR	EOS	2.6 km	MPC · JPL
257960	2001 BY_{12}	—	January 18, 2001	Socorro	LINEAR	·	3.4 km	MPC · JPL
257961	2001 BZ_{31}	—	January 20, 2001	Socorro	LINEAR	·	6.0 km	MPC · JPL
257962	2001 BN_{51}	—	January 16, 2001	Kitt Peak	Spacewatch	NYS	1.5 km	MPC · JPL
257963	2001 BV_{55}	—	January 19, 2001	Socorro	LINEAR	·	2.8 km	MPC · JPL
257964	2001 BD_{61}	—	January 30, 2001	Junk Bond	Junk Bond	·	980 m	MPC · JPL
257965	2001 BK_{75}	—	January 26, 2001	Kitt Peak	Spacewatch	NYS	1.6 km	MPC · JPL
257966	2001 CC_{2}	—	February 1, 2001	Socorro	LINEAR	·	6.1 km	MPC · JPL
257967	2001 CZ_{10}	—	February 1, 2001	Socorro	LINEAR	L4	10 km	MPC · JPL
257968	2001 CK_{17}	—	February 1, 2001	Socorro	LINEAR	LIX	5.2 km	MPC · JPL
257969	2001 CC_{25}	—	February 1, 2001	Socorro	LINEAR	·	3.5 km	MPC · JPL
257970	2001 CS_{31}	—	February 5, 2001	Socorro	LINEAR	EUP	5.5 km	MPC · JPL
257971	2001 CV_{34}	—	February 13, 2001	Socorro	LINEAR	TIR	4.2 km	MPC · JPL
257972	2001 CR_{35}	—	February 13, 2001	Socorro	LINEAR	·	5.3 km	MPC · JPL
257973	2001 CT_{36}	—	February 13, 2001	Kitt Peak	Spacewatch	·	3.1 km	MPC · JPL
257974	2001 CA_{38}	—	February 15, 2001	Socorro	LINEAR	H	720 m	MPC · JPL
257975	2001 CQ_{40}	—	February 15, 2001	Socorro	LINEAR	·	4.0 km	MPC · JPL
257976	2001 CT_{47}	—	February 12, 2001	Anderson Mesa	LONEOS	·	3.4 km	MPC · JPL
257977	2001 CD_{48}	—	February 15, 2001	Socorro	LINEAR	·	4.3 km	MPC · JPL
257978	2001 CR_{48}	—	February 13, 2001	Kitt Peak	Spacewatch	·	3.2 km	MPC · JPL
257979	2001 DA_{6}	—	February 16, 2001	Socorro	LINEAR	TIR	5.2 km	MPC · JPL
257980	2001 DA_{17}	—	February 16, 2001	Socorro	LINEAR	·	1.1 km	MPC · JPL
257981	2001 DM_{19}	—	February 16, 2001	Socorro	LINEAR	·	2.0 km	MPC · JPL
257982	2001 DD_{20}	—	February 16, 2001	Socorro	LINEAR	·	4.2 km	MPC · JPL
257983	2001 DZ_{22}	—	February 17, 2001	Socorro	LINEAR	·	1.4 km	MPC · JPL
257984	2001 DS_{33}	—	February 17, 2001	Socorro	LINEAR	·	1.1 km	MPC · JPL
257985	2001 DC_{59}	—	February 18, 2001	Needville	Dillon, W. G.	·	3.1 km	MPC · JPL
257986	2001 DS_{69}	—	February 19, 2001	Socorro	LINEAR	CYB	5.4 km	MPC · JPL
257987	2001 DY_{77}	—	February 22, 2001	Kitt Peak	Spacewatch	L4	10 km	MPC · JPL
257988	2001 DM_{80}	—	February 20, 2001	Haleakala	NEAT	·	1.4 km	MPC · JPL
257989	2001 DR_{81}	—	February 21, 2001	Kitt Peak	Spacewatch	·	3.1 km	MPC · JPL
257990	2001 DV_{81}	—	February 21, 2001	Kitt Peak	Spacewatch	MAS	900 m	MPC · JPL
257991	2001 DB_{82}	—	February 22, 2001	Kitt Peak	Spacewatch	·	1.2 km	MPC · JPL
257992	2001 DJ_{96}	—	February 17, 2001	Socorro	LINEAR	·	1.2 km	MPC · JPL
257993	2001 DO_{99}	—	February 17, 2001	Socorro	LINEAR	·	5.1 km	MPC · JPL
257994	2001 DB_{109}	—	February 18, 2001	Haleakala	NEAT	·	4.4 km	MPC · JPL
257995	2001 EV_{1}	—	March 1, 2001	Socorro	LINEAR	·	5.0 km	MPC · JPL
257996	2001 ES_{4}	—	March 2, 2001	Anderson Mesa	LONEOS	·	2.9 km	MPC · JPL
257997	2001 EU_{7}	—	March 2, 2001	Anderson Mesa	LONEOS	·	1.6 km	MPC · JPL
257998	2001 EO_{8}	—	March 2, 2001	Anderson Mesa	LONEOS	·	1.2 km	MPC · JPL
257999	2001 EH_{11}	—	March 2, 2001	Haleakala	NEAT	·	1.2 km	MPC · JPL
258000	2001 EQ_{16}	—	March 15, 2001	Haleakala	NEAT	·	1.8 km	MPC · JPL

back to top

== See also ==
- Meanings of minor-planet names: 257001–258000
