= List of minor planets: 258001–259000 =

The following is a partial list of minor planets, running from minor-planet number 258001 through 259000, inclusive. The primary data for this and other partial lists is based on JPL's "Small-Body Orbital Elements" and data available from the Minor Planet Center. Critical list information is also provided by the MPC, unless otherwise specified from Lowell Observatory. A detailed description of the table's columns and additional sources are given on the main page including a complete list of every page in this series, and a statistical break-up on the dynamical classification of minor planets.

Also see the summary list of all named bodies in numerical and alphabetical order, and the corresponding naming citations for the number range of this particular list. New namings may only be added to this list after official publication, as the preannouncement of names is condemned by the Working Group for Small Bodies Nomenclature of the International Astronomical Union.

Near-Earth obj.	MBA (inner)	MBA (outer)	Centaur
Mars-crosser	MBA (middle)	Jupiter trojan	Trans-Neptunian obj.
Unclassified

== 258001–258100 ==
Designation			Discovery			Properties		Ref
Permanent	Provisional	Named after	Date	Site	Discoverer(s)	Category	Diam.	Ref
258001	2001 FO_{9}	—	March 18, 2001	Kitt Peak	Spacewatch	·	3.8 km	MPC · JPL
258002	2001 FG_{13}	—	March 19, 2001	Anderson Mesa	LONEOS	·	1.8 km	MPC · JPL
258003	2001 FU_{25}	—	March 18, 2001	Socorro	LINEAR	·	2.3 km	MPC · JPL
258004	2001 FG_{28}	—	March 19, 2001	Socorro	LINEAR	MAS	1.1 km	MPC · JPL
258005	2001 FC_{46}	—	March 18, 2001	Socorro	LINEAR	EUP	6.0 km	MPC · JPL
258006	2001 FT_{56}	—	March 21, 2001	Anderson Mesa	LONEOS	·	1.2 km	MPC · JPL
258007	2001 FR_{58}	—	March 24, 2001	Haleakala	NEAT	·	5.0 km	MPC · JPL
258008	2001 FS_{60}	—	March 19, 2001	Socorro	LINEAR	·	1.1 km	MPC · JPL
258009	2001 FE_{62}	—	March 19, 2001	Socorro	LINEAR	·	1.2 km	MPC · JPL
258010	2001 FE_{63}	—	March 19, 2001	Socorro	LINEAR	·	6.0 km	MPC · JPL
258011	2001 FS_{73}	—	March 19, 2001	Socorro	LINEAR	·	1.2 km	MPC · JPL
258012	2001 FX_{81}	—	March 23, 2001	Socorro	LINEAR	·	1.7 km	MPC · JPL
258013	2001 FF_{85}	—	March 26, 2001	Kitt Peak	Spacewatch	·	3.5 km	MPC · JPL
258014	2001 FJ_{88}	—	March 26, 2001	Kitt Peak	Spacewatch	NYS	1.5 km	MPC · JPL
258015	2001 FG_{115}	—	March 19, 2001	Anderson Mesa	LONEOS	NYS	1.6 km	MPC · JPL
258016	2001 FR_{120}	—	March 26, 2001	Socorro	LINEAR	·	1.7 km	MPC · JPL
258017	2001 FM_{126}	—	March 26, 2001	Socorro	LINEAR	PHO	3.7 km	MPC · JPL
258018	2001 FJ_{131}	—	March 20, 2001	Haleakala	NEAT	EOS	3.0 km	MPC · JPL
258019	2001 FY_{138}	—	March 21, 2001	Haleakala	NEAT	H	740 m	MPC · JPL
258020	2001 FQ_{141}	—	March 23, 2001	Anderson Mesa	LONEOS	·	4.1 km	MPC · JPL
258021	2001 FM_{145}	—	March 24, 2001	Anderson Mesa	LONEOS	·	3.8 km	MPC · JPL
258022	2001 FQ_{145}	—	March 24, 2001	Kitt Peak	Spacewatch	·	1.0 km	MPC · JPL
258023	2001 FA_{152}	—	March 25, 2001	Powell	Powell	·	1.8 km	MPC · JPL
258024	2001 FP_{160}	—	March 29, 2001	Anderson Mesa	LONEOS	·	6.3 km	MPC · JPL
258025	2001 FM_{168}	—	March 22, 2001	Kitt Peak	Spacewatch	·	1.6 km	MPC · JPL
258026	2001 GQ_{1}	—	April 15, 2001	Prescott	P. G. Comba	(5)	1.6 km	MPC · JPL
258027	2001 HB_{3}	—	April 17, 2001	Socorro	LINEAR	·	2.1 km	MPC · JPL
258028	2001 HF_{17}	—	April 24, 2001	Kitt Peak	Spacewatch	·	1.3 km	MPC · JPL
258029	2001 HL_{20}	—	April 26, 2001	Socorro	LINEAR	·	6.2 km	MPC · JPL
258030	2001 HX_{40}	—	April 27, 2001	Socorro	LINEAR	·	2.5 km	MPC · JPL
258031	2001 HA_{42}	—	April 16, 2001	Socorro	LINEAR	·	1.3 km	MPC · JPL
258032	2001 HC_{63}	—	April 26, 2001	Anderson Mesa	LONEOS	H	740 m	MPC · JPL
258033	2001 HH_{64}	—	April 27, 2001	Kitt Peak	Spacewatch	·	6.3 km	MPC · JPL
258034	2001 HC_{66}	—	April 26, 2001	Anderson Mesa	LONEOS	PHO	1.3 km	MPC · JPL
258035	2001 JH_{3}	—	May 15, 2001	Anderson Mesa	LONEOS	·	1.4 km	MPC · JPL
258036	2001 JD_{11}	—	May 15, 2001	Anderson Mesa	LONEOS	·	1.6 km	MPC · JPL
258037	2001 KX_{29}	—	May 21, 2001	Socorro	LINEAR	·	1.5 km	MPC · JPL
258038	2001 KB_{38}	—	May 22, 2001	Socorro	LINEAR	·	1.9 km	MPC · JPL
258039	2001 KF_{41}	—	May 23, 2001	Socorro	LINEAR	H	830 m	MPC · JPL
258040	2001 KT_{43}	—	May 22, 2001	Socorro	LINEAR	T_{j} (2.99) · EUP	7.4 km	MPC · JPL
258041	2001 KJ_{70}	—	May 23, 2001	Kitt Peak	Spacewatch	EUN · slow	1.6 km	MPC · JPL
258042	2001 KZ_{75}	—	May 29, 2001	Haleakala	NEAT	NYS	1.8 km	MPC · JPL
258043	2001 MT_{6}	—	June 22, 2001	Palomar	NEAT	H	920 m	MPC · JPL
258044	2001 MY_{6}	—	June 17, 2001	Kitt Peak	Spacewatch	·	1.9 km	MPC · JPL
258045	2001 MK_{12}	—	June 21, 2001	Palomar	NEAT	·	2.1 km	MPC · JPL
258046	2001 NL_{1}	—	July 12, 2001	Palomar	NEAT	·	2.0 km	MPC · JPL
258047	2001 NS_{1}	—	July 10, 2001	Palomar	NEAT	EUN	1.6 km	MPC · JPL
258048	2001 NN_{4}	—	July 13, 2001	Palomar	NEAT	·	2.0 km	MPC · JPL
258049	2001 NZ_{7}	—	July 14, 2001	Palomar	NEAT	T_{j} (2.95)	4.6 km	MPC · JPL
258050	2001 NO_{10}	—	July 14, 2001	Haleakala	NEAT	·	1.7 km	MPC · JPL
258051	2001 NK_{18}	—	July 12, 2001	Socorro	LINEAR	·	2.9 km	MPC · JPL
258052	2001 NV_{18}	—	July 13, 2001	Palomar	NEAT	·	5.6 km	MPC · JPL
258053	2001 ND_{19}	—	July 14, 2001	Palomar	NEAT	·	1.8 km	MPC · JPL
258054	2001 NG_{19}	—	July 14, 2001	Palomar	NEAT	·	2.0 km	MPC · JPL
258055	2001 OW_{5}	—	July 17, 2001	Anderson Mesa	LONEOS	·	3.0 km	MPC · JPL
258056	2001 OK_{18}	—	July 17, 2001	Haleakala	NEAT	·	2.6 km	MPC · JPL
258057	2001 OQ_{20}	—	July 21, 2001	Anderson Mesa	LONEOS	·	2.5 km	MPC · JPL
258058	2001 OK_{30}	—	July 19, 2001	Palomar	NEAT	·	2.9 km	MPC · JPL
258059	2001 OC_{44}	—	July 23, 2001	Palomar	NEAT	·	3.4 km	MPC · JPL
258060	2001 ON_{48}	—	July 16, 2001	Haleakala	NEAT	ADE	2.8 km	MPC · JPL
258061	2001 OV_{50}	—	July 20, 2001	Palomar	NEAT	·	2.8 km	MPC · JPL
258062	2001 OD_{52}	—	July 21, 2001	Palomar	NEAT	·	1.9 km	MPC · JPL
258063	2001 OG_{52}	—	July 21, 2001	Palomar	NEAT	·	4.0 km	MPC · JPL
258064	2001 OP_{54}	—	July 22, 2001	Palomar	NEAT	(5)	2.0 km	MPC · JPL
258065	2001 OR_{55}	—	July 22, 2001	Palomar	NEAT	JUN	1.4 km	MPC · JPL
258066	2001 OC_{57}	—	July 16, 2001	Anderson Mesa	LONEOS	·	2.3 km	MPC · JPL
258067	2001 OU_{66}	—	July 23, 2001	Haleakala	NEAT	(5)	2.4 km	MPC · JPL
258068	2001 OW_{69}	—	July 19, 2001	Anderson Mesa	LONEOS	·	3.0 km	MPC · JPL
258069	2001 OZ_{71}	—	July 21, 2001	Anderson Mesa	LONEOS	(1547)	2.8 km	MPC · JPL
258070	2001 OF_{99}	—	July 27, 2001	Anderson Mesa	LONEOS	·	1.6 km	MPC · JPL
258071	2001 OW_{103}	—	July 29, 2001	Anderson Mesa	LONEOS	JUN	2.0 km	MPC · JPL
258072	2001 OH_{113}	—	July 27, 2001	Palomar	NEAT	JUN	1.2 km	MPC · JPL
258073	2001 PW_{2}	—	August 3, 2001	Haleakala	NEAT	·	2.2 km	MPC · JPL
258074	2001 PO_{3}	—	August 8, 2001	Haleakala	NEAT	·	2.2 km	MPC · JPL
258075	2001 PT_{10}	—	August 8, 2001	Haleakala	NEAT	·	1.8 km	MPC · JPL
258076	2001 PO_{11}	—	August 10, 2001	Palomar	NEAT	·	1.9 km	MPC · JPL
258077	2001 PR_{16}	—	August 9, 2001	Palomar	NEAT	·	1.9 km	MPC · JPL
258078	2001 PE_{21}	—	August 10, 2001	Haleakala	NEAT	MAR	1.8 km	MPC · JPL
258079	2001 PO_{22}	—	August 10, 2001	Haleakala	NEAT	H	880 m	MPC · JPL
258080	2001 PA_{31}	—	August 10, 2001	Palomar	NEAT	·	1.0 km	MPC · JPL
258081	2001 PV_{35}	—	August 11, 2001	Palomar	NEAT	JUN	980 m	MPC · JPL
258082	2001 PZ_{36}	—	August 11, 2001	Palomar	NEAT	·	1.7 km	MPC · JPL
258083	2001 PK_{62}	—	August 13, 2001	Palomar	NEAT	·	2.9 km	MPC · JPL
258084	2001 PN_{65}	—	August 12, 2001	Haleakala	NEAT	(5)	1.7 km	MPC · JPL
258085	2001 QS_{6}	—	August 16, 2001	Socorro	LINEAR	·	2.1 km	MPC · JPL
258086	2001 QZ_{53}	—	August 16, 2001	Socorro	LINEAR	·	1.4 km	MPC · JPL
258087	2001 QK_{57}	—	August 16, 2001	Socorro	LINEAR	·	2.4 km	MPC · JPL
258088	2001 QC_{82}	—	August 17, 2001	Socorro	LINEAR	·	2.1 km	MPC · JPL
258089	2001 QE_{82}	—	August 17, 2001	Socorro	LINEAR	·	2.4 km	MPC · JPL
258090	2001 QB_{87}	—	August 17, 2001	Palomar	NEAT	EUN	2.0 km	MPC · JPL
258091	2001 QF_{114}	—	August 17, 2001	Socorro	LINEAR	EUN	1.3 km	MPC · JPL
258092	2001 QW_{115}	—	August 17, 2001	Socorro	LINEAR	·	2.1 km	MPC · JPL
258093	2001 QK_{133}	—	August 21, 2001	Socorro	LINEAR	·	1.4 km	MPC · JPL
258094	2001 QJ_{134}	—	August 22, 2001	Socorro	LINEAR	EUN	1.5 km	MPC · JPL
258095	2001 QZ_{137}	—	August 22, 2001	Socorro	LINEAR	·	2.3 km	MPC · JPL
258096	2001 QR_{146}	—	August 26, 2001	Kitt Peak	Spacewatch	MRX	1.5 km	MPC · JPL
258097	2001 QT_{149}	—	August 24, 2001	Haleakala	NEAT	·	2.3 km	MPC · JPL
258098	2001 QG_{156}	—	August 23, 2001	Anderson Mesa	LONEOS	(5)	1.2 km	MPC · JPL
258099	2001 QC_{162}	—	August 23, 2001	Anderson Mesa	LONEOS	·	1.7 km	MPC · JPL
258100	2001 QA_{164}	—	August 20, 2001	Palomar	NEAT	·	2.2 km	MPC · JPL

== 258101–258200 ==
back to top

Designation			Discovery			Properties		Ref
Permanent	Provisional	Named after	Date	Site	Discoverer(s)	Category	Diam.	Ref
258101	2001 QZ_{164}	—	August 22, 2001	Haleakala	NEAT	(5)	1.9 km	MPC · JPL
258102	2001 QO_{170}	—	August 24, 2001	Socorro	LINEAR	·	3.1 km	MPC · JPL
258103	2001 QK_{177}	—	August 22, 2001	Palomar	NEAT	(5)	1.6 km	MPC · JPL
258104	2001 QX_{185}	—	August 21, 2001	Kitt Peak	Spacewatch	·	1.9 km	MPC · JPL
258105	2001 QJ_{187}	—	August 21, 2001	Palomar	NEAT	·	2.3 km	MPC · JPL
258106	2001 QC_{191}	—	August 22, 2001	Socorro	LINEAR	·	2.6 km	MPC · JPL
258107	2001 QM_{200}	—	August 22, 2001	Palomar	NEAT	·	2.1 km	MPC · JPL
258108	2001 QU_{200}	—	August 22, 2001	Socorro	LINEAR	·	2.2 km	MPC · JPL
258109	2001 QE_{208}	—	August 23, 2001	Anderson Mesa	LONEOS	·	3.1 km	MPC · JPL
258110	2001 QW_{213}	—	August 23, 2001	Anderson Mesa	LONEOS	·	2.3 km	MPC · JPL
258111	2001 QO_{222}	—	August 24, 2001	Anderson Mesa	LONEOS	RAF	1.4 km	MPC · JPL
258112	2001 QZ_{227}	—	August 24, 2001	Anderson Mesa	LONEOS	·	2.9 km	MPC · JPL
258113	2001 QY_{228}	—	August 24, 2001	Anderson Mesa	LONEOS	·	1.7 km	MPC · JPL
258114	2001 QG_{237}	—	August 24, 2001	Socorro	LINEAR	·	2.7 km	MPC · JPL
258115	2001 QT_{252}	—	August 25, 2001	Socorro	LINEAR	ADE	2.4 km	MPC · JPL
258116	2001 QV_{253}	—	August 25, 2001	Anderson Mesa	LONEOS	MAR	1.6 km	MPC · JPL
258117	2001 QM_{260}	—	August 25, 2001	Socorro	LINEAR	·	2.2 km	MPC · JPL
258118	2001 QG_{276}	—	August 19, 2001	Socorro	LINEAR	·	1.7 km	MPC · JPL
258119	2001 QR_{280}	—	August 19, 2001	Socorro	LINEAR	JUN	1.3 km	MPC · JPL
258120	2001 QY_{280}	—	August 19, 2001	Socorro	LINEAR	·	2.0 km	MPC · JPL
258121	2001 QB_{288}	—	August 17, 2001	Socorro	LINEAR	·	3.0 km	MPC · JPL
258122	2001 QX_{292}	—	August 16, 2001	Palomar	NEAT	·	2.2 km	MPC · JPL
258123	2001 QK_{293}	—	August 31, 2001	Palomar	NEAT	·	2.4 km	MPC · JPL
258124	2001 QX_{327}	—	August 19, 2001	Socorro	LINEAR	(5)	1.7 km	MPC · JPL
258125	2001 QB_{328}	—	August 23, 2001	Palomar	NEAT	·	2.4 km	MPC · JPL
258126	2001 RV_{15}	—	September 8, 2001	Socorro	LINEAR	·	2.4 km	MPC · JPL
258127	2001 RY_{20}	—	September 7, 2001	Socorro	LINEAR	·	1.7 km	MPC · JPL
258128	2001 RQ_{23}	—	September 7, 2001	Socorro	LINEAR	·	2.7 km	MPC · JPL
258129	2001 RX_{24}	—	September 7, 2001	Socorro	LINEAR	EUN	1.9 km	MPC · JPL
258130	2001 RB_{25}	—	September 7, 2001	Socorro	LINEAR	·	1.0 km	MPC · JPL
258131	2001 RH_{31}	—	September 7, 2001	Socorro	LINEAR	BRG	1.8 km	MPC · JPL
258132	2001 RN_{42}	—	September 11, 2001	Socorro	LINEAR	·	2.5 km	MPC · JPL
258133	2001 RP_{48}	—	September 11, 2001	Socorro	LINEAR	·	2.4 km	MPC · JPL
258134	2001 RW_{54}	—	September 12, 2001	Socorro	LINEAR	·	1.8 km	MPC · JPL
258135	2001 RL_{64}	—	September 10, 2001	Socorro	LINEAR	·	3.5 km	MPC · JPL
258136	2001 RU_{65}	—	September 10, 2001	Socorro	LINEAR	·	1.8 km	MPC · JPL
258137	2001 RM_{68}	—	September 10, 2001	Socorro	LINEAR	·	1.7 km	MPC · JPL
258138	2001 RY_{84}	—	September 11, 2001	Anderson Mesa	LONEOS	(5)	1.7 km	MPC · JPL
258139	2001 RM_{110}	—	September 12, 2001	Socorro	LINEAR	·	1.3 km	MPC · JPL
258140	2001 RY_{111}	—	September 12, 2001	Socorro	LINEAR	·	1.8 km	MPC · JPL
258141	2001 RF_{112}	—	September 12, 2001	Socorro	LINEAR	3:2	6.8 km	MPC · JPL
258142	2001 RP_{113}	—	September 12, 2001	Socorro	LINEAR	·	2.2 km	MPC · JPL
258143	2001 RV_{117}	—	September 12, 2001	Socorro	LINEAR	·	1.5 km	MPC · JPL
258144	2001 RW_{120}	—	September 12, 2001	Socorro	LINEAR	3:2	7.3 km	MPC · JPL
258145	2001 RY_{130}	—	September 12, 2001	Socorro	LINEAR	AEO	1.3 km	MPC · JPL
258146	2001 RF_{133}	—	September 12, 2001	Socorro	LINEAR	·	2.1 km	MPC · JPL
258147	2001 RV_{145}	—	September 8, 2001	Socorro	LINEAR	JUN	1.2 km	MPC · JPL
258148	2001 RY_{149}	—	September 11, 2001	Anderson Mesa	LONEOS	3:2 · SHU	6.7 km	MPC · JPL
258149	2001 SM_{4}	—	September 18, 2001	Goodricke-Pigott	R. A. Tucker	·	2.7 km	MPC · JPL
258150	2001 ST_{6}	—	September 18, 2001	Kitt Peak	Spacewatch	·	1.9 km	MPC · JPL
258151	2001 SX_{11}	—	September 16, 2001	Socorro	LINEAR	·	1.6 km	MPC · JPL
258152	2001 SA_{25}	—	September 16, 2001	Socorro	LINEAR	·	1.5 km	MPC · JPL
258153	2001 SB_{25}	—	September 16, 2001	Socorro	LINEAR	·	1.2 km	MPC · JPL
258154	2001 SO_{43}	—	September 16, 2001	Socorro	LINEAR	T_{j} (2.99) · EUP	5.6 km	MPC · JPL
258155	2001 SZ_{57}	—	September 17, 2001	Socorro	LINEAR	·	2.3 km	MPC · JPL
258156	2001 SA_{59}	—	September 17, 2001	Socorro	LINEAR	EUN	1.8 km	MPC · JPL
258157	2001 SS_{59}	—	September 17, 2001	Socorro	LINEAR	EUN	1.4 km	MPC · JPL
258158	2001 SQ_{63}	—	September 17, 2001	Socorro	LINEAR	·	2.2 km	MPC · JPL
258159	2001 SK_{67}	—	September 17, 2001	Socorro	LINEAR	·	1.6 km	MPC · JPL
258160	2001 SH_{75}	—	September 19, 2001	Anderson Mesa	LONEOS	EUN	1.8 km	MPC · JPL
258161	2001 SE_{84}	—	September 20, 2001	Socorro	LINEAR	·	1.8 km	MPC · JPL
258162	2001 SU_{85}	—	September 20, 2001	Socorro	LINEAR	·	1.3 km	MPC · JPL
258163	2001 SB_{91}	—	September 20, 2001	Socorro	LINEAR	·	2.5 km	MPC · JPL
258164	2001 SL_{97}	—	September 20, 2001	Socorro	LINEAR	AGN	1.3 km	MPC · JPL
258165	2001 SC_{98}	—	September 20, 2001	Socorro	LINEAR	·	1.7 km	MPC · JPL
258166	2001 SY_{104}	—	September 20, 2001	Socorro	LINEAR	·	1.3 km	MPC · JPL
258167	2001 SF_{116}	—	September 22, 2001	Eskridge	G. Hug	·	2.4 km	MPC · JPL
258168	2001 SE_{118}	—	September 16, 2001	Socorro	LINEAR	·	2.7 km	MPC · JPL
258169	2001 SR_{121}	—	September 16, 2001	Socorro	LINEAR	·	1.8 km	MPC · JPL
258170	2001 SJ_{129}	—	September 16, 2001	Socorro	LINEAR	·	1.8 km	MPC · JPL
258171	2001 SX_{132}	—	September 16, 2001	Socorro	LINEAR	·	2.1 km	MPC · JPL
258172	2001 SJ_{133}	—	September 16, 2001	Socorro	LINEAR	·	2.0 km	MPC · JPL
258173	2001 SK_{134}	—	September 16, 2001	Socorro	LINEAR	·	2.0 km	MPC · JPL
258174	2001 SF_{145}	—	September 16, 2001	Socorro	LINEAR	·	1.4 km	MPC · JPL
258175	2001 SO_{146}	—	September 16, 2001	Socorro	LINEAR	·	2.4 km	MPC · JPL
258176	2001 SC_{153}	—	September 17, 2001	Socorro	LINEAR	·	1.8 km	MPC · JPL
258177	2001 SW_{153}	—	September 17, 2001	Socorro	LINEAR	·	2.0 km	MPC · JPL
258178	2001 SS_{159}	—	September 17, 2001	Socorro	LINEAR	·	1.5 km	MPC · JPL
258179	2001 SL_{166}	—	September 19, 2001	Socorro	LINEAR	·	1.8 km	MPC · JPL
258180	2001 SY_{170}	—	September 16, 2001	Socorro	LINEAR	·	1.9 km	MPC · JPL
258181	2001 SQ_{178}	—	September 17, 2001	Socorro	LINEAR	EUN	2.0 km	MPC · JPL
258182	2001 ST_{179}	—	September 19, 2001	Socorro	LINEAR	·	2.2 km	MPC · JPL
258183	2001 SG_{185}	—	September 19, 2001	Socorro	LINEAR	·	1.7 km	MPC · JPL
258184	2001 SJ_{190}	—	September 19, 2001	Socorro	LINEAR	·	1.9 km	MPC · JPL
258185	2001 SE_{194}	—	September 19, 2001	Socorro	LINEAR	·	1.8 km	MPC · JPL
258186	2001 SG_{194}	—	September 19, 2001	Socorro	LINEAR	·	2.2 km	MPC · JPL
258187	2001 SG_{196}	—	September 19, 2001	Socorro	LINEAR	·	1.7 km	MPC · JPL
258188	2001 SD_{208}	—	September 19, 2001	Socorro	LINEAR	(5)	1.3 km	MPC · JPL
258189	2001 SX_{218}	—	September 19, 2001	Socorro	LINEAR	·	1.9 km	MPC · JPL
258190	2001 SZ_{222}	—	September 19, 2001	Socorro	LINEAR	·	1.5 km	MPC · JPL
258191	2001 SU_{233}	—	September 19, 2001	Socorro	LINEAR	·	1.8 km	MPC · JPL
258192	2001 SF_{234}	—	September 19, 2001	Socorro	LINEAR	·	1.5 km	MPC · JPL
258193	2001 SU_{242}	—	September 19, 2001	Socorro	LINEAR	·	2.1 km	MPC · JPL
258194	2001 SA_{250}	—	September 19, 2001	Socorro	LINEAR	NAE	5.4 km	MPC · JPL
258195	2001 SM_{273}	—	September 18, 2001	Kitt Peak	Spacewatch	·	1.9 km	MPC · JPL
258196	2001 SP_{278}	—	September 21, 2001	Anderson Mesa	LONEOS	·	2.3 km	MPC · JPL
258197	2001 SW_{285}	—	September 28, 2001	Fountain Hills	C. W. Juels, P. R. Holvorcem	·	3.5 km	MPC · JPL
258198	2001 SL_{288}	—	September 28, 2001	Palomar	NEAT	·	2.0 km	MPC · JPL
258199	2001 SR_{304}	—	September 20, 2001	Socorro	LINEAR	·	1.8 km	MPC · JPL
258200	2001 SN_{305}	—	September 20, 2001	Socorro	LINEAR	MAR	1.4 km	MPC · JPL

== 258201–258300 ==
back to top

Designation			Discovery			Properties		Ref
Permanent	Provisional	Named after	Date	Site	Discoverer(s)	Category	Diam.	Ref
258201	2001 SM_{306}	—	September 20, 2001	Socorro	LINEAR	·	1.9 km	MPC · JPL
258202	2001 SS_{314}	—	September 23, 2001	Socorro	LINEAR	GEF	1.7 km	MPC · JPL
258203	2001 SU_{315}	—	September 25, 2001	Socorro	LINEAR	·	2.4 km	MPC · JPL
258204	2001 SH_{318}	—	September 20, 2001	Socorro	LINEAR	AGN	1.4 km	MPC · JPL
258205	2001 ST_{326}	—	September 18, 2001	Kitt Peak	Spacewatch	·	1.9 km	MPC · JPL
258206	2001 SW_{326}	—	September 18, 2001	Kitt Peak	Spacewatch	·	1.7 km	MPC · JPL
258207	2001 SJ_{332}	—	September 19, 2001	Palomar	NEAT	·	1.6 km	MPC · JPL
258208	2001 ST_{335}	—	September 20, 2001	Socorro	LINEAR	·	1.6 km	MPC · JPL
258209	2001 SF_{348}	—	September 26, 2001	Socorro	LINEAR	·	2.1 km	MPC · JPL
258210	2001 SA_{350}	—	September 20, 2001	Socorro	LINEAR	AGN	1.6 km	MPC · JPL
258211	2001 SR_{351}	—	September 18, 2001	Apache Point	SDSS	·	2.3 km	MPC · JPL
258212	2001 SQ_{354}	—	September 18, 2001	Anderson Mesa	LONEOS	·	1.9 km	MPC · JPL
258213	2001 TT_{4}	—	October 8, 2001	Palomar	NEAT	·	2.0 km	MPC · JPL
258214	2001 TN_{5}	—	October 10, 2001	Palomar	NEAT	·	1.7 km	MPC · JPL
258215	2001 TP_{11}	—	October 13, 2001	Socorro	LINEAR	·	1.8 km	MPC · JPL
258216	2001 TM_{17}	—	October 14, 2001	Goodricke-Pigott	R. A. Tucker	JUN	1.6 km	MPC · JPL
258217	2001 TL_{19}	—	October 9, 2001	Socorro	LINEAR	EUN	2.2 km	MPC · JPL
258218	2001 TV_{26}	—	October 14, 2001	Socorro	LINEAR	·	2.4 km	MPC · JPL
258219	2001 TW_{33}	—	October 14, 2001	Socorro	LINEAR	·	2.6 km	MPC · JPL
258220	2001 TV_{35}	—	October 14, 2001	Socorro	LINEAR	·	3.2 km	MPC · JPL
258221	2001 TE_{58}	—	October 13, 2001	Socorro	LINEAR	·	2.1 km	MPC · JPL
258222	2001 TH_{60}	—	October 13, 2001	Socorro	LINEAR	MIS	2.7 km	MPC · JPL
258223	2001 TH_{61}	—	October 13, 2001	Socorro	LINEAR	·	2.6 km	MPC · JPL
258224	2001 TE_{62}	—	October 13, 2001	Socorro	LINEAR	·	2.4 km	MPC · JPL
258225	2001 TH_{64}	—	October 13, 2001	Socorro	LINEAR	BAR	1.7 km	MPC · JPL
258226	2001 TB_{67}	—	October 13, 2001	Socorro	LINEAR	DOR	2.9 km	MPC · JPL
258227	2001 TZ_{75}	—	October 13, 2001	Socorro	LINEAR	EUN	1.8 km	MPC · JPL
258228	2001 TO_{82}	—	October 14, 2001	Socorro	LINEAR	JUN	1.3 km	MPC · JPL
258229	2001 TN_{83}	—	October 14, 2001	Socorro	LINEAR	·	1.6 km	MPC · JPL
258230	2001 TL_{88}	—	October 14, 2001	Socorro	LINEAR	EOS	2.7 km	MPC · JPL
258231	2001 TN_{101}	—	October 15, 2001	Socorro	LINEAR	(21344)	1.8 km	MPC · JPL
258232	2001 TF_{110}	—	October 14, 2001	Socorro	LINEAR	·	2.4 km	MPC · JPL
258233	2001 TP_{110}	—	October 14, 2001	Socorro	LINEAR	·	3.2 km	MPC · JPL
258234	2001 TK_{113}	—	October 14, 2001	Socorro	LINEAR	(5)	1.8 km	MPC · JPL
258235	2001 TG_{116}	—	October 14, 2001	Socorro	LINEAR	·	3.2 km	MPC · JPL
258236	2001 TZ_{117}	—	October 15, 2001	Socorro	LINEAR	·	2.6 km	MPC · JPL
258237	2001 TF_{119}	—	October 15, 2001	Socorro	LINEAR	·	1.9 km	MPC · JPL
258238	2001 TA_{121}	—	October 15, 2001	Socorro	LINEAR	·	2.2 km	MPC · JPL
258239	2001 TX_{121}	—	October 15, 2001	Socorro	LINEAR	L5	15 km	MPC · JPL
258240	2001 TP_{134}	—	October 13, 2001	Palomar	NEAT	·	1.8 km	MPC · JPL
258241	2001 TY_{136}	—	October 14, 2001	Palomar	NEAT	GEF	1.8 km	MPC · JPL
258242	2001 TD_{141}	—	October 10, 2001	Palomar	NEAT	·	1.9 km	MPC · JPL
258243	2001 TC_{143}	—	October 10, 2001	Palomar	NEAT	(5)	1.7 km	MPC · JPL
258244	2001 TC_{155}	—	October 13, 2001	Kitt Peak	Spacewatch	·	1.9 km	MPC · JPL
258245	2001 TH_{160}	—	October 15, 2001	Kitt Peak	Spacewatch	·	2.3 km	MPC · JPL
258246	2001 TB_{163}	—	October 11, 2001	Palomar	NEAT	(5)	1.1 km	MPC · JPL
258247	2001 TX_{165}	—	October 14, 2001	Socorro	LINEAR	JUN	1.5 km	MPC · JPL
258248	2001 TJ_{168}	—	October 15, 2001	Socorro	LINEAR	BRA	2.2 km	MPC · JPL
258249	2001 TK_{170}	—	October 13, 2001	Palomar	NEAT	·	4.1 km	MPC · JPL
258250	2001 TC_{171}	—	October 15, 2001	Haleakala	NEAT	·	1.9 km	MPC · JPL
258251	2001 TZ_{178}	—	October 14, 2001	Socorro	LINEAR	·	2.1 km	MPC · JPL
258252	2001 TA_{179}	—	October 14, 2001	Socorro	LINEAR	·	2.4 km	MPC · JPL
258253	2001 TY_{179}	—	October 14, 2001	Socorro	LINEAR	·	2.4 km	MPC · JPL
258254	2001 TQ_{181}	—	October 14, 2001	Socorro	LINEAR	EOS	2.8 km	MPC · JPL
258255	2001 TN_{186}	—	October 14, 2001	Socorro	LINEAR	·	2.4 km	MPC · JPL
258256	2001 TP_{189}	—	October 14, 2001	Socorro	LINEAR	·	2.5 km	MPC · JPL
258257	2001 TF_{195}	—	October 15, 2001	Palomar	NEAT	KON	3.0 km	MPC · JPL
258258	2001 TP_{202}	—	October 11, 2001	Socorro	LINEAR	·	2.7 km	MPC · JPL
258259	2001 TN_{205}	—	October 11, 2001	Socorro	LINEAR	BRG	2.4 km	MPC · JPL
258260	2001 TZ_{206}	—	October 11, 2001	Palomar	NEAT	·	2.1 km	MPC · JPL
258261	2001 TJ_{212}	—	October 13, 2001	Anderson Mesa	LONEOS	·	2.1 km	MPC · JPL
258262	2001 TJ_{216}	—	October 13, 2001	Palomar	NEAT	·	2.9 km	MPC · JPL
258263	2001 TS_{218}	—	October 14, 2001	Anderson Mesa	LONEOS	·	2.0 km	MPC · JPL
258264	2001 TM_{220}	—	October 14, 2001	Socorro	LINEAR	·	2.5 km	MPC · JPL
258265	2001 TX_{228}	—	October 15, 2001	Socorro	LINEAR	·	2.6 km	MPC · JPL
258266	2001 TV_{231}	—	October 15, 2001	Kitt Peak	Spacewatch	·	1.7 km	MPC · JPL
258267	2001 TY_{233}	—	October 15, 2001	Kitt Peak	Spacewatch	·	1.8 km	MPC · JPL
258268	2001 TF_{235}	—	October 15, 2001	Palomar	NEAT	·	2.5 km	MPC · JPL
258269	2001 TB_{236}	—	October 15, 2001	Palomar	NEAT	·	2.4 km	MPC · JPL
258270	2001 TW_{245}	—	October 14, 2001	Apache Point	SDSS	·	1.4 km	MPC · JPL
258271	2001 TM_{257}	—	October 10, 2001	Palomar	NEAT	·	1.4 km	MPC · JPL
258272	2001 TN_{258}	—	October 13, 2001	Anderson Mesa	LONEOS	·	2.8 km	MPC · JPL
258273	2001 TF_{259}	—	October 8, 2001	Palomar	NEAT	·	2.7 km	MPC · JPL
258274	2001 US	—	October 16, 2001	Socorro	LINEAR	BAR	1.4 km	MPC · JPL
258275	2001 UV_{8}	—	October 17, 2001	Socorro	LINEAR	(194)	2.4 km	MPC · JPL
258276	2001 UG_{12}	—	October 24, 2001	Desert Eagle	W. K. Y. Yeung	·	1.8 km	MPC · JPL
258277	2001 UV_{18}	—	October 16, 2001	Palomar	NEAT	·	1.8 km	MPC · JPL
258278	2001 UE_{20}	—	October 16, 2001	Palomar	NEAT	HNS	1.4 km	MPC · JPL
258279	2001 UZ_{23}	—	October 18, 2001	Socorro	LINEAR	·	2.3 km	MPC · JPL
258280	2001 UG_{24}	—	October 18, 2001	Socorro	LINEAR	·	2.9 km	MPC · JPL
258281	2001 UD_{36}	—	October 16, 2001	Socorro	LINEAR	·	2.1 km	MPC · JPL
258282	2001 UP_{36}	—	October 16, 2001	Socorro	LINEAR	·	3.1 km	MPC · JPL
258283	2001 UC_{37}	—	October 16, 2001	Socorro	LINEAR	·	2.5 km	MPC · JPL
258284	2001 UP_{37}	—	October 17, 2001	Socorro	LINEAR	·	1.8 km	MPC · JPL
258285	2001 UV_{41}	—	October 17, 2001	Socorro	LINEAR	MIS	3.6 km	MPC · JPL
258286	2001 UT_{43}	—	October 17, 2001	Socorro	LINEAR	WIT	1.4 km	MPC · JPL
258287	2001 UD_{54}	—	October 18, 2001	Socorro	LINEAR	·	1.4 km	MPC · JPL
258288	2001 UL_{64}	—	October 18, 2001	Socorro	LINEAR	EUN	2.1 km	MPC · JPL
258289	2001 UU_{70}	—	October 17, 2001	Kitt Peak	Spacewatch	·	1.9 km	MPC · JPL
258290	2001 UY_{72}	—	October 16, 2001	Socorro	LINEAR	·	1.6 km	MPC · JPL
258291	2001 UX_{79}	—	October 20, 2001	Socorro	LINEAR	·	1.9 km	MPC · JPL
258292	2001 UX_{82}	—	October 20, 2001	Socorro	LINEAR	·	1.7 km	MPC · JPL
258293	2001 UF_{90}	—	October 21, 2001	Kitt Peak	Spacewatch	·	1.5 km	MPC · JPL
258294	2001 UQ_{91}	—	October 18, 2001	Palomar	NEAT	·	2.1 km	MPC · JPL
258295	2001 UX_{92}	—	October 19, 2001	Palomar	NEAT	WIT	1.0 km	MPC · JPL
258296	2001 UJ_{95}	—	October 19, 2001	Palomar	NEAT	·	1.6 km	MPC · JPL
258297	2001 UO_{95}	—	October 19, 2001	Palomar	NEAT	·	2.2 km	MPC · JPL
258298	2001 UT_{99}	—	October 17, 2001	Socorro	LINEAR	·	1.6 km	MPC · JPL
258299	2001 UG_{100}	—	October 17, 2001	Socorro	LINEAR	·	2.6 km	MPC · JPL
258300	2001 UK_{100}	—	October 17, 2001	Socorro	LINEAR	·	2.0 km	MPC · JPL

== 258301–258400 ==
back to top

Designation			Discovery			Properties		Ref
Permanent	Provisional	Named after	Date	Site	Discoverer(s)	Category	Diam.	Ref
258301	2001 UB_{107}	—	October 20, 2001	Socorro	LINEAR	·	2.0 km	MPC · JPL
258302	2001 UY_{122}	—	October 22, 2001	Socorro	LINEAR	·	2.0 km	MPC · JPL
258303	2001 UK_{136}	—	October 22, 2001	Socorro	LINEAR	·	2.2 km	MPC · JPL
258304	2001 UH_{138}	—	October 23, 2001	Socorro	LINEAR	·	2.2 km	MPC · JPL
258305	2001 UL_{141}	—	October 23, 2001	Socorro	LINEAR	AGN	1.6 km	MPC · JPL
258306	2001 UR_{158}	—	October 23, 2001	Socorro	LINEAR	·	2.3 km	MPC · JPL
258307	2001 UC_{165}	—	October 23, 2001	Palomar	NEAT	·	2.2 km	MPC · JPL
258308	2001 US_{169}	—	October 21, 2001	Socorro	LINEAR	HIL · 3:2	10 km	MPC · JPL
258309	2001 UM_{171}	—	October 23, 2001	Socorro	LINEAR	·	1.9 km	MPC · JPL
258310	2001 UN_{173}	—	October 18, 2001	Palomar	NEAT	·	2.5 km	MPC · JPL
258311	2001 UY_{185}	—	October 17, 2001	Palomar	NEAT	·	2.5 km	MPC · JPL
258312	2001 UX_{190}	—	October 18, 2001	Palomar	NEAT	WIT	1.1 km	MPC · JPL
258313	2001 UC_{192}	—	October 18, 2001	Socorro	LINEAR	·	2.2 km	MPC · JPL
258314	2001 UK_{192}	—	October 18, 2001	Socorro	LINEAR	·	2.3 km	MPC · JPL
258315	2001 UC_{193}	—	October 18, 2001	Anderson Mesa	LONEOS	·	4.0 km	MPC · JPL
258316	2001 UJ_{199}	—	October 19, 2001	Anderson Mesa	LONEOS	EUN	2.0 km	MPC · JPL
258317	2001 UY_{199}	—	October 19, 2001	Palomar	NEAT	·	1.6 km	MPC · JPL
258318	2001 UW_{203}	—	October 19, 2001	Palomar	NEAT	·	1.5 km	MPC · JPL
258319	2001 UR_{204}	—	October 19, 2001	Palomar	NEAT	(5)	1.7 km	MPC · JPL
258320	2001 UH_{206}	—	October 20, 2001	Kitt Peak	Spacewatch	PAD	1.7 km	MPC · JPL
258321	2001 UX_{220}	—	October 21, 2001	Socorro	LINEAR	·	2.5 km	MPC · JPL
258322	2001 UA_{225}	—	October 24, 2001	Palomar	NEAT	·	2.0 km	MPC · JPL
258323 Róbertbarsa	2001 UR_{225}	Róbertbarsa	October 16, 2001	Palomar	NEAT	(5)	1.6 km	MPC · JPL
258324	2001 UP_{230}	—	October 25, 2001	Apache Point	SDSS	·	2.1 km	MPC · JPL
258325	2001 VB_{2}	—	November 7, 2001	Socorro	LINEAR	AMO	570 m	MPC · JPL
258326	2001 VH_{6}	—	November 9, 2001	Socorro	LINEAR	ADE	3.0 km	MPC · JPL
258327	2001 VV_{6}	—	November 9, 2001	Socorro	LINEAR	·	1.4 km	MPC · JPL
258328	2001 VC_{14}	—	November 10, 2001	Socorro	LINEAR	·	1.8 km	MPC · JPL
258329	2001 VO_{17}	—	November 10, 2001	Bergisch Gladbach	W. Bickel	·	2.5 km	MPC · JPL
258330	2001 VQ_{21}	—	November 9, 2001	Socorro	LINEAR	·	3.1 km	MPC · JPL
258331	2001 VK_{29}	—	November 9, 2001	Socorro	LINEAR	·	1.8 km	MPC · JPL
258332	2001 VW_{67}	—	November 11, 2001	Socorro	LINEAR	RAF	1.2 km	MPC · JPL
258333	2001 VA_{68}	—	November 11, 2001	Socorro	LINEAR	·	2.2 km	MPC · JPL
258334	2001 VD_{68}	—	November 11, 2001	Socorro	LINEAR	·	3.4 km	MPC · JPL
258335	2001 VJ_{68}	—	November 11, 2001	Socorro	LINEAR	·	3.3 km	MPC · JPL
258336	2001 VL_{68}	—	November 11, 2001	Socorro	LINEAR	·	2.5 km	MPC · JPL
258337	2001 VK_{72}	—	November 12, 2001	Kitt Peak	Spacewatch	·	1.6 km	MPC · JPL
258338	2001 VS_{72}	—	November 12, 2001	Kitt Peak	Spacewatch	·	1.6 km	MPC · JPL
258339	2001 VU_{77}	—	November 11, 2001	Kitt Peak	Spacewatch	·	2.4 km	MPC · JPL
258340	2001 VG_{85}	—	November 12, 2001	Socorro	LINEAR	·	2.5 km	MPC · JPL
258341	2001 VK_{90}	—	November 15, 2001	Socorro	LINEAR	·	2.1 km	MPC · JPL
258342	2001 VQ_{90}	—	November 15, 2001	Socorro	LINEAR	EUN	1.6 km	MPC · JPL
258343	2001 VQ_{95}	—	November 15, 2001	Socorro	LINEAR	·	2.3 km	MPC · JPL
258344	2001 VK_{101}	—	November 12, 2001	Socorro	LINEAR	·	2.4 km	MPC · JPL
258345	2001 VL_{101}	—	November 12, 2001	Socorro	LINEAR	·	2.5 km	MPC · JPL
258346	2001 VN_{101}	—	November 12, 2001	Socorro	LINEAR	·	2.1 km	MPC · JPL
258347	2001 VP_{108}	—	November 12, 2001	Socorro	LINEAR	·	1.5 km	MPC · JPL
258348	2001 VU_{109}	—	November 12, 2001	Socorro	LINEAR	KOR	1.8 km	MPC · JPL
258349	2001 VA_{111}	—	November 12, 2001	Socorro	LINEAR	MRX	1.4 km	MPC · JPL
258350	2001 VL_{111}	—	November 12, 2001	Socorro	LINEAR	·	1.9 km	MPC · JPL
258351	2001 VH_{114}	—	November 12, 2001	Socorro	LINEAR	·	4.4 km	MPC · JPL
258352	2001 WL	—	November 16, 2001	Kitt Peak	Spacewatch	·	2.1 km	MPC · JPL
258353	2001 WZ_{2}	—	November 16, 2001	Kitt Peak	Spacewatch	·	1.9 km	MPC · JPL
258354	2001 WQ_{8}	—	November 17, 2001	Socorro	LINEAR	·	3.4 km	MPC · JPL
258355	2001 WM_{16}	—	November 17, 2001	Socorro	LINEAR	·	1.7 km	MPC · JPL
258356	2001 WM_{42}	—	November 18, 2001	Socorro	LINEAR	·	2.8 km	MPC · JPL
258357	2001 WM_{44}	—	November 18, 2001	Socorro	LINEAR	·	2.2 km	MPC · JPL
258358	2001 WB_{48}	—	November 19, 2001	Anderson Mesa	LONEOS	·	2.6 km	MPC · JPL
258359	2001 WL_{48}	—	November 19, 2001	Anderson Mesa	LONEOS	·	3.2 km	MPC · JPL
258360	2001 WJ_{53}	—	November 19, 2001	Socorro	LINEAR	·	3.0 km	MPC · JPL
258361	2001 WS_{58}	—	November 19, 2001	Socorro	LINEAR	·	1.9 km	MPC · JPL
258362	2001 WO_{62}	—	November 19, 2001	Socorro	LINEAR	(7744)	1.4 km	MPC · JPL
258363	2001 WX_{64}	—	November 20, 2001	Socorro	LINEAR	·	1.7 km	MPC · JPL
258364	2001 WA_{65}	—	November 20, 2001	Socorro	LINEAR	·	2.2 km	MPC · JPL
258365	2001 WW_{65}	—	November 20, 2001	Socorro	LINEAR	L5	9.6 km	MPC · JPL
258366	2001 WL_{85}	—	November 20, 2001	Socorro	LINEAR	·	2.4 km	MPC · JPL
258367	2001 WT_{87}	—	November 19, 2001	Socorro	LINEAR	·	1.9 km	MPC · JPL
258368	2001 WQ_{89}	—	November 20, 2001	Socorro	LINEAR	·	2.5 km	MPC · JPL
258369	2001 WV_{90}	—	November 21, 2001	Socorro	LINEAR	·	2.7 km	MPC · JPL
258370	2001 WN_{96}	—	November 17, 2001	Kitt Peak	Spacewatch	·	2.0 km	MPC · JPL
258371	2001 XS	—	December 7, 2001	Eskridge	G. Hug	·	3.1 km	MPC · JPL
258372	2001 XH_{3}	—	December 8, 2001	Uccle	H. M. J. Boffin	JUN · fast	1.2 km	MPC · JPL
258373	2001 XC_{11}	—	December 7, 2001	Socorro	LINEAR	·	2.9 km	MPC · JPL
258374	2001 XJ_{12}	—	December 9, 2001	Socorro	LINEAR	·	2.6 km	MPC · JPL
258375	2001 XK_{13}	—	December 9, 2001	Socorro	LINEAR	MRX	1.4 km	MPC · JPL
258376	2001 XN_{20}	—	December 9, 2001	Socorro	LINEAR	·	3.7 km	MPC · JPL
258377	2001 XB_{21}	—	December 9, 2001	Socorro	LINEAR	·	4.5 km	MPC · JPL
258378	2001 XC_{34}	—	December 9, 2001	Socorro	LINEAR	·	2.6 km	MPC · JPL
258379	2001 XR_{34}	—	December 9, 2001	Socorro	LINEAR	·	2.5 km	MPC · JPL
258380	2001 XB_{36}	—	December 9, 2001	Socorro	LINEAR	·	3.4 km	MPC · JPL
258381	2001 XG_{40}	—	December 9, 2001	Socorro	LINEAR	·	3.3 km	MPC · JPL
258382	2001 XC_{43}	—	December 9, 2001	Socorro	LINEAR	·	3.3 km	MPC · JPL
258383	2001 XM_{52}	—	December 11, 2001	Socorro	LINEAR	·	1.9 km	MPC · JPL
258384	2001 XX_{55}	—	December 10, 2001	Socorro	LINEAR	·	1.8 km	MPC · JPL
258385	2001 XV_{56}	—	December 10, 2001	Socorro	LINEAR	CLO	2.9 km	MPC · JPL
258386	2001 XF_{61}	—	December 10, 2001	Socorro	LINEAR	·	2.9 km	MPC · JPL
258387	2001 XY_{66}	—	December 10, 2001	Socorro	LINEAR	·	3.5 km	MPC · JPL
258388	2001 XU_{69}	—	December 11, 2001	Socorro	LINEAR	·	2.6 km	MPC · JPL
258389	2001 XX_{73}	—	December 11, 2001	Socorro	LINEAR	MAR	1.7 km	MPC · JPL
258390	2001 XQ_{74}	—	December 11, 2001	Socorro	LINEAR	·	2.0 km	MPC · JPL
258391	2001 XN_{77}	—	December 11, 2001	Socorro	LINEAR	·	2.6 km	MPC · JPL
258392	2001 XJ_{82}	—	December 11, 2001	Socorro	LINEAR	·	2.1 km	MPC · JPL
258393	2001 XZ_{83}	—	December 11, 2001	Socorro	LINEAR	·	3.9 km	MPC · JPL
258394	2001 XA_{88}	—	December 14, 2001	Desert Eagle	W. K. Y. Yeung	·	2.4 km	MPC · JPL
258395	2001 XO_{94}	—	December 10, 2001	Socorro	LINEAR	ADE	2.9 km	MPC · JPL
258396	2001 XQ_{96}	—	December 10, 2001	Socorro	LINEAR	EUN	2.2 km	MPC · JPL
258397	2001 XV_{101}	—	December 10, 2001	Socorro	LINEAR	·	3.6 km	MPC · JPL
258398	2001 XR_{104}	—	December 14, 2001	Kitt Peak	Spacewatch	·	760 m	MPC · JPL
258399	2001 XU_{111}	—	December 11, 2001	Socorro	LINEAR	·	2.5 km	MPC · JPL
258400	2001 XM_{117}	—	December 13, 2001	Socorro	LINEAR	·	2.7 km	MPC · JPL

== 258401–258500 ==
back to top

Designation			Discovery			Properties		Ref
Permanent	Provisional	Named after	Date	Site	Discoverer(s)	Category	Diam.	Ref
258401	2001 XR_{122}	—	December 14, 2001	Socorro	LINEAR	·	4.2 km	MPC · JPL
258402	2001 XX_{122}	—	December 14, 2001	Socorro	LINEAR	·	2.6 km	MPC · JPL
258403	2001 XG_{125}	—	December 14, 2001	Socorro	LINEAR	·	2.6 km	MPC · JPL
258404	2001 XF_{127}	—	December 14, 2001	Socorro	LINEAR	·	6.1 km	MPC · JPL
258405	2001 XD_{134}	—	December 14, 2001	Socorro	LINEAR	·	2.2 km	MPC · JPL
258406	2001 XT_{134}	—	December 14, 2001	Socorro	LINEAR	·	2.8 km	MPC · JPL
258407	2001 XD_{135}	—	December 14, 2001	Socorro	LINEAR	·	2.2 km	MPC · JPL
258408	2001 XH_{135}	—	December 14, 2001	Socorro	LINEAR	·	2.0 km	MPC · JPL
258409	2001 XD_{139}	—	December 14, 2001	Socorro	LINEAR	526	2.6 km	MPC · JPL
258410	2001 XG_{146}	—	December 14, 2001	Socorro	LINEAR	·	3.1 km	MPC · JPL
258411	2001 XK_{147}	—	December 14, 2001	Socorro	LINEAR	·	2.7 km	MPC · JPL
258412	2001 XH_{150}	—	December 14, 2001	Socorro	LINEAR	·	2.4 km	MPC · JPL
258413	2001 XM_{150}	—	December 14, 2001	Socorro	LINEAR	·	2.6 km	MPC · JPL
258414	2001 XY_{157}	—	December 14, 2001	Socorro	LINEAR	·	4.5 km	MPC · JPL
258415	2001 XC_{161}	—	December 14, 2001	Socorro	LINEAR	·	2.2 km	MPC · JPL
258416	2001 XK_{164}	—	December 14, 2001	Socorro	LINEAR	·	2.2 km	MPC · JPL
258417	2001 XW_{176}	—	December 14, 2001	Socorro	LINEAR	·	4.2 km	MPC · JPL
258418	2001 XB_{178}	—	December 14, 2001	Socorro	LINEAR	·	3.5 km	MPC · JPL
258419	2001 XG_{181}	—	December 14, 2001	Socorro	LINEAR	DOR	3.1 km	MPC · JPL
258420	2001 XM_{182}	—	December 14, 2001	Socorro	LINEAR	·	2.8 km	MPC · JPL
258421	2001 XN_{183}	—	December 14, 2001	Socorro	LINEAR	·	2.1 km	MPC · JPL
258422	2001 XR_{185}	—	December 14, 2001	Socorro	LINEAR	·	3.0 km	MPC · JPL
258423	2001 XG_{187}	—	December 14, 2001	Socorro	LINEAR	·	2.1 km	MPC · JPL
258424	2001 XM_{188}	—	December 14, 2001	Socorro	LINEAR	·	3.2 km	MPC · JPL
258425	2001 XB_{191}	—	December 14, 2001	Socorro	LINEAR	·	2.9 km	MPC · JPL
258426	2001 XK_{198}	—	December 14, 2001	Socorro	LINEAR	·	5.9 km	MPC · JPL
258427	2001 XL_{198}	—	December 14, 2001	Socorro	LINEAR	·	1.2 km	MPC · JPL
258428	2001 XU_{198}	—	December 14, 2001	Socorro	LINEAR	·	2.4 km	MPC · JPL
258429	2001 XS_{204}	—	December 11, 2001	Socorro	LINEAR	·	3.4 km	MPC · JPL
258430	2001 XE_{205}	—	December 11, 2001	Socorro	LINEAR	EOS	2.5 km	MPC · JPL
258431	2001 XB_{206}	—	December 11, 2001	Socorro	LINEAR	·	2.2 km	MPC · JPL
258432	2001 XC_{210}	—	December 11, 2001	Socorro	LINEAR	·	3.0 km	MPC · JPL
258433	2001 XL_{214}	—	December 11, 2001	Socorro	LINEAR	GAL	2.8 km	MPC · JPL
258434	2001 XD_{225}	—	December 15, 2001	Socorro	LINEAR	·	2.7 km	MPC · JPL
258435	2001 XJ_{226}	—	December 15, 2001	Socorro	LINEAR	·	2.2 km	MPC · JPL
258436	2001 XP_{226}	—	December 15, 2001	Socorro	LINEAR	·	2.8 km	MPC · JPL
258437	2001 XU_{229}	—	December 15, 2001	Socorro	LINEAR	MRX	1.3 km	MPC · JPL
258438	2001 XZ_{230}	—	December 15, 2001	Socorro	LINEAR	·	2.1 km	MPC · JPL
258439	2001 XF_{231}	—	December 15, 2001	Socorro	LINEAR	·	1.8 km	MPC · JPL
258440	2001 XX_{234}	—	December 15, 2001	Socorro	LINEAR	·	2.2 km	MPC · JPL
258441	2001 XF_{237}	—	December 15, 2001	Socorro	LINEAR	·	2.5 km	MPC · JPL
258442	2001 XP_{241}	—	December 14, 2001	Socorro	LINEAR	·	2.5 km	MPC · JPL
258443	2001 XX_{241}	—	December 14, 2001	Socorro	LINEAR	·	870 m	MPC · JPL
258444	2001 XA_{242}	—	December 14, 2001	Socorro	LINEAR	GEF	1.8 km	MPC · JPL
258445	2001 XJ_{249}	—	December 14, 2001	Kitt Peak	Spacewatch	AGN	1.8 km	MPC · JPL
258446	2001 XP_{250}	—	December 14, 2001	Socorro	LINEAR	·	3.8 km	MPC · JPL
258447	2001 XD_{251}	—	December 14, 2001	Socorro	LINEAR	·	2.1 km	MPC · JPL
258448	2001 XO_{251}	—	December 14, 2001	Socorro	LINEAR	EUN	2.0 km	MPC · JPL
258449	2001 XT_{256}	—	December 7, 2001	Socorro	LINEAR	·	1.7 km	MPC · JPL
258450	2001 XS_{266}	—	December 14, 2001	Socorro	LINEAR	GEF	1.5 km	MPC · JPL
258451	2001 YX_{8}	—	December 17, 2001	Socorro	LINEAR	EUN	2.0 km	MPC · JPL
258452	2001 YA_{12}	—	December 17, 2001	Socorro	LINEAR	·	2.5 km	MPC · JPL
258453	2001 YT_{51}	—	December 18, 2001	Socorro	LINEAR	·	3.2 km	MPC · JPL
258454	2001 YK_{56}	—	December 18, 2001	Socorro	LINEAR	·	2.8 km	MPC · JPL
258455	2001 YE_{74}	—	December 18, 2001	Socorro	LINEAR	·	3.4 km	MPC · JPL
258456	2001 YL_{78}	—	December 18, 2001	Socorro	LINEAR	GEF	1.8 km	MPC · JPL
258457	2001 YW_{89}	—	December 18, 2001	Socorro	LINEAR	·	2.2 km	MPC · JPL
258458	2001 YA_{103}	—	December 17, 2001	Socorro	LINEAR	AEO	1.6 km	MPC · JPL
258459	2001 YW_{106}	—	December 17, 2001	Socorro	LINEAR	·	2.4 km	MPC · JPL
258460	2001 YS_{107}	—	December 17, 2001	Socorro	LINEAR	DOR	3.2 km	MPC · JPL
258461	2001 YL_{120}	—	December 20, 2001	Socorro	LINEAR	·	2.6 km	MPC · JPL
258462	2001 YB_{123}	—	December 17, 2001	Socorro	LINEAR	·	3.1 km	MPC · JPL
258463	2001 YC_{123}	—	December 17, 2001	Socorro	LINEAR	·	3.0 km	MPC · JPL
258464	2001 YA_{126}	—	December 17, 2001	Socorro	LINEAR	GEF	1.9 km	MPC · JPL
258465	2001 YX_{126}	—	December 17, 2001	Socorro	LINEAR	·	2.0 km	MPC · JPL
258466	2001 YK_{130}	—	December 17, 2001	Socorro	LINEAR	·	3.0 km	MPC · JPL
258467	2001 YS_{131}	—	December 18, 2001	Socorro	LINEAR	EUN	1.7 km	MPC · JPL
258468	2001 YY_{133}	—	December 20, 2001	Kitt Peak	Spacewatch	EOS	2.8 km	MPC · JPL
258469	2001 YK_{135}	—	December 19, 2001	Socorro	LINEAR	(13314)	2.7 km	MPC · JPL
258470	2001 YG_{145}	—	December 17, 2001	Socorro	LINEAR	·	2.4 km	MPC · JPL
258471	2001 YP_{150}	—	December 19, 2001	Socorro	LINEAR	EUN	1.6 km	MPC · JPL
258472	2001 YT_{153}	—	December 19, 2001	Palomar	NEAT	·	3.3 km	MPC · JPL
258473	2001 YW_{160}	—	December 18, 2001	Kitt Peak	Spacewatch	·	2.5 km	MPC · JPL
258474	2002 AE_{12}	—	January 10, 2002	Campo Imperatore	CINEOS	JUN	1.3 km	MPC · JPL
258475	2002 AL_{12}	—	January 10, 2002	Campo Imperatore	CINEOS	·	2.6 km	MPC · JPL
258476	2002 AN_{13}	—	January 11, 2002	Desert Eagle	W. K. Y. Yeung	slow	2.1 km	MPC · JPL
258477	2002 AC_{17}	—	January 5, 2002	Haleakala	NEAT	·	3.1 km	MPC · JPL
258478	2002 AY_{18}	—	January 15, 2002	Socorro	LINEAR	·	3.4 km	MPC · JPL
258479	2002 AB_{20}	—	January 5, 2002	Haleakala	NEAT	·	4.5 km	MPC · JPL
258480	2002 AY_{22}	—	January 5, 2002	Haleakala	NEAT	EUN	2.4 km	MPC · JPL
258481	2002 AL_{24}	—	January 8, 2002	Palomar	NEAT	CLO	3.0 km	MPC · JPL
258482	2002 AX_{25}	—	January 8, 2002	Kitt Peak	Spacewatch	·	2.7 km	MPC · JPL
258483	2002 AS_{35}	—	January 8, 2002	Socorro	LINEAR	MRX	1.3 km	MPC · JPL
258484	2002 AD_{37}	—	January 9, 2002	Socorro	LINEAR	·	4.6 km	MPC · JPL
258485	2002 AT_{39}	—	January 9, 2002	Socorro	LINEAR	·	6.9 km	MPC · JPL
258486	2002 AK_{43}	—	January 9, 2002	Socorro	LINEAR	AGN	1.6 km	MPC · JPL
258487	2002 AO_{44}	—	January 9, 2002	Socorro	LINEAR	·	4.3 km	MPC · JPL
258488	2002 AG_{45}	—	January 9, 2002	Socorro	LINEAR	·	2.7 km	MPC · JPL
258489	2002 AM_{45}	—	January 9, 2002	Socorro	LINEAR	·	3.1 km	MPC · JPL
258490	2002 AQ_{45}	—	January 9, 2002	Socorro	LINEAR	·	1.1 km	MPC · JPL
258491	2002 AY_{46}	—	January 9, 2002	Socorro	LINEAR	·	2.4 km	MPC · JPL
258492	2002 AY_{49}	—	January 9, 2002	Socorro	LINEAR	EOS	2.7 km	MPC · JPL
258493	2002 AE_{53}	—	January 9, 2002	Socorro	LINEAR	EOS	2.6 km	MPC · JPL
258494	2002 AW_{57}	—	January 9, 2002	Socorro	LINEAR	·	6.3 km	MPC · JPL
258495	2002 AO_{61}	—	January 11, 2002	Socorro	LINEAR	·	4.1 km	MPC · JPL
258496	2002 AA_{63}	—	January 11, 2002	Socorro	LINEAR	PHO	1.4 km	MPC · JPL
258497	2002 AU_{65}	—	January 12, 2002	Socorro	LINEAR	·	2.1 km	MPC · JPL
258498	2002 AV_{65}	—	January 12, 2002	Socorro	LINEAR	·	2.3 km	MPC · JPL
258499	2002 AG_{66}	—	January 12, 2002	Socorro	LINEAR	·	2.4 km	MPC · JPL
258500	2002 AO_{79}	—	January 8, 2002	Socorro	LINEAR	·	2.7 km	MPC · JPL

== 258501–258600 ==
back to top

Designation			Discovery			Properties		Ref
Permanent	Provisional	Named after	Date	Site	Discoverer(s)	Category	Diam.	Ref
258501	2002 AD_{101}	—	January 8, 2002	Socorro	LINEAR	·	2.6 km	MPC · JPL
258502	2002 AF_{107}	—	January 9, 2002	Socorro	LINEAR	·	1.0 km	MPC · JPL
258503	2002 AJ_{108}	—	January 9, 2002	Socorro	LINEAR	·	2.2 km	MPC · JPL
258504	2002 AT_{110}	—	January 9, 2002	Socorro	LINEAR	·	3.0 km	MPC · JPL
258505	2002 AD_{114}	—	January 9, 2002	Socorro	LINEAR	·	2.8 km	MPC · JPL
258506	2002 AX_{114}	—	January 9, 2002	Socorro	LINEAR	·	3.1 km	MPC · JPL
258507	2002 AC_{124}	—	January 9, 2002	Socorro	LINEAR	·	3.1 km	MPC · JPL
258508	2002 AK_{124}	—	January 9, 2002	Socorro	LINEAR	·	1.3 km	MPC · JPL
258509	2002 AE_{125}	—	January 11, 2002	Socorro	LINEAR	·	3.1 km	MPC · JPL
258510	2002 AA_{126}	—	January 11, 2002	Socorro	LINEAR	·	2.8 km	MPC · JPL
258511	2002 AO_{133}	—	January 9, 2002	Socorro	LINEAR	·	2.7 km	MPC · JPL
258512	2002 AB_{136}	—	January 9, 2002	Socorro	LINEAR	EOS	2.9 km	MPC · JPL
258513	2002 AZ_{141}	—	January 13, 2002	Socorro	LINEAR	·	2.6 km	MPC · JPL
258514	2002 AR_{142}	—	January 13, 2002	Socorro	LINEAR	MAR	1.7 km	MPC · JPL
258515	2002 AK_{152}	—	January 14, 2002	Socorro	LINEAR	·	4.4 km	MPC · JPL
258516	2002 AF_{162}	—	January 13, 2002	Socorro	LINEAR	·	3.5 km	MPC · JPL
258517	2002 AD_{171}	—	January 14, 2002	Socorro	LINEAR	·	2.5 km	MPC · JPL
258518	2002 AF_{176}	—	January 14, 2002	Socorro	LINEAR	·	2.7 km	MPC · JPL
258519	2002 AS_{182}	—	January 5, 2002	Anderson Mesa	LONEOS	·	2.9 km	MPC · JPL
258520	2002 AS_{186}	—	January 8, 2002	Palomar	NEAT	·	2.3 km	MPC · JPL
258521	2002 AS_{193}	—	January 12, 2002	Socorro	LINEAR	·	2.9 km	MPC · JPL
258522	2002 AP_{197}	—	January 14, 2002	Palomar	NEAT	·	4.5 km	MPC · JPL
258523	2002 AT_{199}	—	January 8, 2002	Socorro	LINEAR	HYG	3.5 km	MPC · JPL
258524	2002 AY_{204}	—	January 7, 2002	Kitt Peak	Spacewatch	·	4.1 km	MPC · JPL
258525	2002 AF_{207}	—	January 13, 2002	Apache Point	SDSS	·	2.9 km	MPC · JPL
258526	2002 AW_{208}	—	January 9, 2002	Socorro	LINEAR	·	5.2 km	MPC · JPL
258527	2002 BL	—	January 18, 2002	Powell	Powell	·	740 m	MPC · JPL
258528	2002 BT_{2}	—	January 20, 2002	Kitt Peak	Spacewatch	·	5.1 km	MPC · JPL
258529	2002 BQ_{4}	—	January 19, 2002	Anderson Mesa	LONEOS	·	3.1 km	MPC · JPL
258530	2002 BS_{5}	—	January 18, 2002	Socorro	LINEAR	·	4.1 km	MPC · JPL
258531	2002 BG_{8}	—	January 18, 2002	Socorro	LINEAR	·	2.0 km	MPC · JPL
258532	2002 BT_{15}	—	January 19, 2002	Socorro	LINEAR	·	800 m	MPC · JPL
258533	2002 BV_{15}	—	January 19, 2002	Socorro	LINEAR	·	3.1 km	MPC · JPL
258534	2002 BG_{19}	—	January 21, 2002	Socorro	LINEAR	·	4.7 km	MPC · JPL
258535	2002 BN_{22}	—	January 22, 2002	Socorro	LINEAR	·	3.5 km	MPC · JPL
258536	2002 BB_{27}	—	January 19, 2002	Socorro	LINEAR	·	2.6 km	MPC · JPL
258537	2002 BE_{28}	—	January 19, 2002	Socorro	LINEAR	·	2.6 km	MPC · JPL
258538	2002 BL_{31}	—	January 22, 2002	Palomar	NEAT	L4	10 km	MPC · JPL
258539	2002 CD_{2}	—	February 3, 2002	Palomar	NEAT	·	2.5 km	MPC · JPL
258540	2002 CD_{16}	—	February 4, 2002	Cima Ekar	ADAS	·	2.9 km	MPC · JPL
258541	2002 CR_{18}	—	February 6, 2002	Socorro	LINEAR	·	4.3 km	MPC · JPL
258542	2002 CX_{18}	—	February 6, 2002	Socorro	LINEAR	TIR	4.9 km	MPC · JPL
258543	2002 CP_{20}	—	February 4, 2002	Haleakala	NEAT	·	3.3 km	MPC · JPL
258544	2002 CY_{23}	—	February 6, 2002	Palomar	NEAT	·	2.6 km	MPC · JPL
258545	2002 CG_{24}	—	February 6, 2002	Haleakala	NEAT	·	2.7 km	MPC · JPL
258546	2002 CQ_{27}	—	February 6, 2002	Socorro	LINEAR	·	2.6 km	MPC · JPL
258547	2002 CU_{28}	—	February 6, 2002	Socorro	LINEAR	·	3.0 km	MPC · JPL
258548	2002 CD_{30}	—	February 6, 2002	Socorro	LINEAR	·	5.9 km	MPC · JPL
258549	2002 CU_{39}	—	February 4, 2002	Haleakala	NEAT	·	2.7 km	MPC · JPL
258550	2002 CV_{40}	—	February 7, 2002	Palomar	NEAT	·	4.4 km	MPC · JPL
258551	2002 CM_{47}	—	February 3, 2002	Haleakala	NEAT	·	5.7 km	MPC · JPL
258552	2002 CW_{48}	—	February 3, 2002	Haleakala	NEAT	WAT	2.7 km	MPC · JPL
258553	2002 CZ_{54}	—	February 7, 2002	Socorro	LINEAR	·	920 m	MPC · JPL
258554	2002 CK_{57}	—	February 7, 2002	Socorro	LINEAR	·	2.4 km	MPC · JPL
258555	2002 CK_{62}	—	February 6, 2002	Socorro	LINEAR	GEF	1.3 km	MPC · JPL
258556	2002 CJ_{63}	—	February 6, 2002	Socorro	LINEAR	·	2.5 km	MPC · JPL
258557	2002 CP_{65}	—	February 6, 2002	Socorro	LINEAR	·	5.1 km	MPC · JPL
258558	2002 CN_{67}	—	February 7, 2002	Socorro	LINEAR	·	2.5 km	MPC · JPL
258559	2002 CX_{68}	—	February 7, 2002	Socorro	LINEAR	·	4.6 km	MPC · JPL
258560	2002 CM_{73}	—	February 7, 2002	Socorro	LINEAR	KOR	2.0 km	MPC · JPL
258561	2002 CU_{77}	—	February 7, 2002	Socorro	LINEAR	·	2.6 km	MPC · JPL
258562	2002 CX_{78}	—	February 7, 2002	Socorro	LINEAR	EOS	3.1 km	MPC · JPL
258563	2002 CW_{79}	—	February 7, 2002	Socorro	LINEAR	·	3.0 km	MPC · JPL
258564	2002 CK_{85}	—	February 7, 2002	Socorro	LINEAR	·	2.8 km	MPC · JPL
258565	2002 CL_{88}	—	February 7, 2002	Socorro	LINEAR	THM	3.1 km	MPC · JPL
258566	2002 CS_{93}	—	February 7, 2002	Socorro	LINEAR	·	910 m	MPC · JPL
258567	2002 CC_{94}	—	February 7, 2002	Socorro	LINEAR	L4	10 km	MPC · JPL
258568	2002 CP_{109}	—	February 7, 2002	Socorro	LINEAR	·	1.0 km	MPC · JPL
258569	2002 CT_{117}	—	February 12, 2002	Desert Eagle	W. K. Y. Yeung	·	2.3 km	MPC · JPL
258570	2002 CH_{120}	—	February 7, 2002	Socorro	LINEAR	·	1.1 km	MPC · JPL
258571	2002 CA_{125}	—	February 7, 2002	Socorro	LINEAR	·	1.1 km	MPC · JPL
258572	2002 CV_{131}	—	February 7, 2002	Socorro	LINEAR	·	1.4 km	MPC · JPL
258573	2002 CJ_{135}	—	February 8, 2002	Socorro	LINEAR	EOS	2.6 km	MPC · JPL
258574	2002 CZ_{135}	—	February 8, 2002	Socorro	LINEAR	·	3.0 km	MPC · JPL
258575	2002 CU_{136}	—	February 8, 2002	Socorro	LINEAR	·	5.7 km	MPC · JPL
258576	2002 CF_{143}	—	February 9, 2002	Socorro	LINEAR	·	2.4 km	MPC · JPL
258577	2002 CM_{147}	—	February 10, 2002	Socorro	LINEAR	·	700 m	MPC · JPL
258578	2002 CQ_{149}	—	February 10, 2002	Socorro	LINEAR	AEO	1.1 km	MPC · JPL
258579	2002 CH_{151}	—	February 10, 2002	Socorro	LINEAR	·	2.9 km	MPC · JPL
258580	2002 CS_{153}	—	February 8, 2002	Kitt Peak	Spacewatch	NYS	1.2 km	MPC · JPL
258581	2002 CH_{161}	—	February 8, 2002	Socorro	LINEAR	EOS ·	6.2 km	MPC · JPL
258582	2002 CC_{164}	—	February 8, 2002	Socorro	LINEAR	·	4.7 km	MPC · JPL
258583	2002 CZ_{164}	—	February 8, 2002	Socorro	LINEAR	·	3.3 km	MPC · JPL
258584	2002 CX_{167}	—	February 8, 2002	Socorro	LINEAR	·	1.9 km	MPC · JPL
258585	2002 CD_{172}	—	February 8, 2002	Socorro	LINEAR	·	1.0 km	MPC · JPL
258586	2002 CO_{173}	—	February 8, 2002	Socorro	LINEAR	·	5.0 km	MPC · JPL
258587	2002 CH_{175}	—	February 10, 2002	Socorro	LINEAR	·	780 m	MPC · JPL
258588	2002 CZ_{183}	—	February 10, 2002	Socorro	LINEAR	·	3.9 km	MPC · JPL
258589	2002 CG_{184}	—	February 10, 2002	Socorro	LINEAR	EOS	2.4 km	MPC · JPL
258590	2002 CK_{185}	—	February 10, 2002	Socorro	LINEAR	·	1.1 km	MPC · JPL
258591	2002 CP_{192}	—	February 10, 2002	Socorro	LINEAR	EOS	2.7 km	MPC · JPL
258592	2002 CH_{193}	—	February 10, 2002	Socorro	LINEAR	·	2.2 km	MPC · JPL
258593	2002 CR_{194}	—	February 10, 2002	Socorro	LINEAR	EOS	2.3 km	MPC · JPL
258594	2002 CG_{196}	—	February 10, 2002	Socorro	LINEAR	KOR	2.1 km	MPC · JPL
258595	2002 CZ_{198}	—	February 10, 2002	Socorro	LINEAR	·	3.9 km	MPC · JPL
258596	2002 CS_{203}	—	February 10, 2002	Socorro	LINEAR	·	3.4 km	MPC · JPL
258597	2002 CJ_{204}	—	February 10, 2002	Socorro	LINEAR	L4	10 km	MPC · JPL
258598	2002 CG_{221}	—	February 10, 2002	Socorro	LINEAR	·	1.1 km	MPC · JPL
258599	2002 CZ_{226}	—	February 6, 2002	Palomar	NEAT	·	2.8 km	MPC · JPL
258600	2002 CQ_{232}	—	February 10, 2002	Socorro	LINEAR	·	2.1 km	MPC · JPL

== 258601–258700 ==
back to top

Designation			Discovery			Properties		Ref
Permanent	Provisional	Named after	Date	Site	Discoverer(s)	Category	Diam.	Ref
258601	2002 CD_{235}	—	February 12, 2002	Kitt Peak	Spacewatch	·	610 m	MPC · JPL
258602	2002 CA_{236}	—	February 13, 2002	Palomar	NEAT	EUP	5.8 km	MPC · JPL
258603	2002 CH_{241}	—	February 11, 2002	Socorro	LINEAR	·	850 m	MPC · JPL
258604	2002 CK_{253}	—	February 3, 2002	Cima Ekar	ADAS	·	2.9 km	MPC · JPL
258605	2002 CT_{253}	—	February 4, 2002	Anderson Mesa	LONEOS	·	1.0 km	MPC · JPL
258606	2002 CT_{256}	—	February 4, 2002	Palomar	NEAT	DOR	2.7 km	MPC · JPL
258607	2002 CW_{265}	—	February 7, 2002	Kitt Peak	Spacewatch	·	2.0 km	MPC · JPL
258608	2002 CP_{271}	—	February 8, 2002	Kitt Peak	M. W. Buie	·	3.4 km	MPC · JPL
258609	2002 CM_{284}	—	February 9, 2002	Kitt Peak	Spacewatch	·	3.9 km	MPC · JPL
258610	2002 CR_{290}	—	February 10, 2002	Socorro	LINEAR	·	6.3 km	MPC · JPL
258611	2002 CJ_{302}	—	February 12, 2002	Socorro	LINEAR	·	1.1 km	MPC · JPL
258612	2002 CR_{302}	—	February 12, 2002	Socorro	LINEAR	EOS	2.6 km	MPC · JPL
258613	2002 CT_{305}	—	February 3, 2002	Palomar	NEAT	DOR	3.0 km	MPC · JPL
258614	2002 CY_{308}	—	February 10, 2002	Socorro	LINEAR	AGN	1.4 km	MPC · JPL
258615	2002 CD_{310}	—	February 6, 2002	Palomar	NEAT	MRX	1.6 km	MPC · JPL
258616	2002 CM_{313}	—	February 13, 2002	Palomar	NEAT	·	4.4 km	MPC · JPL
258617	2002 CG_{314}	—	February 10, 2002	Socorro	LINEAR	·	2.5 km	MPC · JPL
258618	2002 CE_{315}	—	February 6, 2002	Palomar	NEAT	·	2.8 km	MPC · JPL
258619	2002 CF_{315}	—	February 6, 2002	Palomar	NEAT	·	4.1 km	MPC · JPL
258620	2002 CQ_{315}	—	February 6, 2002	Kitt Peak	M. W. Buie	·	4.2 km	MPC · JPL
258621	2002 CF_{316}	—	February 14, 2002	Kitt Peak	Spacewatch	L4	10 km	MPC · JPL
258622	2002 DJ_{11}	—	February 20, 2002	Socorro	LINEAR	HYG	4.3 km	MPC · JPL
258623	2002 DP_{12}	—	February 22, 2002	Palomar	NEAT	·	1.4 km	MPC · JPL
258624	2002 DM_{13}	—	February 16, 2002	Palomar	NEAT	L4	12 km	MPC · JPL
258625	2002 DH_{14}	—	February 16, 2002	Palomar	NEAT	·	2.7 km	MPC · JPL
258626	2002 DS_{14}	—	February 16, 2002	Palomar	NEAT	·	930 m	MPC · JPL
258627	2002 DA_{15}	—	February 16, 2002	Palomar	NEAT	L4	10 km	MPC · JPL
258628	2002 DW_{15}	—	February 16, 2002	Palomar	NEAT	L4	10 km	MPC · JPL
258629	2002 EU	—	March 3, 2002	Haleakala	NEAT	·	1.8 km	MPC · JPL
258630	2002 EE_{1}	—	March 5, 2002	Eskridge	Farpoint	·	4.4 km	MPC · JPL
258631	2002 EZ_{7}	—	March 11, 2002	Palomar	NEAT	L4	10 km	MPC · JPL
258632	2002 ES_{8}	—	March 11, 2002	Ondřejov	P. Kušnirák	·	4.1 km	MPC · JPL
258633	2002 ES_{27}	—	March 9, 2002	Socorro	LINEAR	·	3.0 km	MPC · JPL
258634	2002 EN_{29}	—	March 9, 2002	Socorro	LINEAR	·	2.8 km	MPC · JPL
258635	2002 ET_{31}	—	March 9, 2002	Palomar	NEAT	·	1.6 km	MPC · JPL
258636	2002 EU_{31}	—	March 9, 2002	Palomar	NEAT	NYS	940 m	MPC · JPL
258637	2002 EA_{32}	—	March 9, 2002	Palomar	NEAT	·	940 m	MPC · JPL
258638	2002 EM_{33}	—	March 11, 2002	Palomar	NEAT	·	3.5 km	MPC · JPL
258639	2002 ES_{34}	—	March 11, 2002	Palomar	NEAT	·	880 m	MPC · JPL
258640	2002 ER_{36}	—	March 9, 2002	Kitt Peak	Spacewatch	KOR	2.2 km	MPC · JPL
258641	2002 ER_{37}	—	March 9, 2002	Kitt Peak	Spacewatch	·	2.2 km	MPC · JPL
258642	2002 EZ_{37}	—	March 10, 2002	Kitt Peak	Spacewatch	(43176)	3.3 km	MPC · JPL
258643	2002 EL_{40}	—	March 9, 2002	Socorro	LINEAR	·	1.2 km	MPC · JPL
258644	2002 EB_{42}	—	March 12, 2002	Socorro	LINEAR	·	2.3 km	MPC · JPL
258645	2002 EP_{46}	—	March 11, 2002	Haleakala	NEAT	·	950 m	MPC · JPL
258646	2002 EK_{51}	—	March 12, 2002	Kitt Peak	Spacewatch	L4	10 km	MPC · JPL
258647	2002 EU_{51}	—	March 9, 2002	Socorro	LINEAR	·	860 m	MPC · JPL
258648	2002 EW_{51}	—	March 9, 2002	Socorro	LINEAR	·	2.5 km	MPC · JPL
258649	2002 EC_{58}	—	March 13, 2002	Socorro	LINEAR	·	750 m	MPC · JPL
258650	2002 EB_{59}	—	March 13, 2002	Socorro	LINEAR	·	3.8 km	MPC · JPL
258651	2002 EM_{60}	—	March 13, 2002	Socorro	LINEAR	LIX	3.8 km	MPC · JPL
258652	2002 EA_{66}	—	March 13, 2002	Socorro	LINEAR	·	1.5 km	MPC · JPL
258653	2002 EH_{67}	—	March 13, 2002	Socorro	LINEAR	·	1.4 km	MPC · JPL
258654	2002 EU_{67}	—	March 13, 2002	Socorro	LINEAR	·	1.3 km	MPC · JPL
258655	2002 EQ_{73}	—	March 13, 2002	Socorro	LINEAR	·	2.1 km	MPC · JPL
258656	2002 ES_{76}	—	March 11, 2002	Kitt Peak	Spacewatch	L4	8.2 km	MPC · JPL
258657	2002 EJ_{82}	—	March 13, 2002	Palomar	NEAT	·	3.9 km	MPC · JPL
258658	2002 ED_{84}	—	March 9, 2002	Socorro	LINEAR	·	2.6 km	MPC · JPL
258659	2002 EM_{93}	—	March 14, 2002	Socorro	LINEAR	·	960 m	MPC · JPL
258660	2002 EP_{95}	—	March 14, 2002	Socorro	LINEAR	THM	3.1 km	MPC · JPL
258661	2002 EV_{95}	—	March 14, 2002	Socorro	LINEAR	·	970 m	MPC · JPL
258662	2002 EY_{99}	—	March 5, 2002	Anderson Mesa	LONEOS	·	3.2 km	MPC · JPL
258663	2002 ET_{100}	—	March 5, 2002	Haleakala	NEAT	GEF	2.1 km	MPC · JPL
258664	2002 EK_{101}	—	March 6, 2002	Palomar	NEAT	·	850 m	MPC · JPL
258665	2002 EN_{101}	—	March 6, 2002	Palomar	NEAT	·	1.0 km	MPC · JPL
258666	2002 EM_{102}	—	March 6, 2002	Palomar	NEAT	EUP	4.8 km	MPC · JPL
258667	2002 EH_{105}	—	March 9, 2002	Anderson Mesa	LONEOS	·	1.3 km	MPC · JPL
258668	2002 EQ_{105}	—	March 9, 2002	Anderson Mesa	LONEOS	·	3.6 km	MPC · JPL
258669	2002 ET_{118}	—	March 10, 2002	Kitt Peak	Spacewatch	L4	10 km	MPC · JPL
258670	2002 ED_{120}	—	March 10, 2002	Haleakala	NEAT	L4	10 km	MPC · JPL
258671	2002 EU_{126}	—	March 12, 2002	Anderson Mesa	LONEOS	·	960 m	MPC · JPL
258672	2002 EV_{126}	—	March 12, 2002	Socorro	LINEAR	·	2.4 km	MPC · JPL
258673	2002 EZ_{126}	—	March 12, 2002	Palomar	NEAT	·	4.0 km	MPC · JPL
258674	2002 EC_{128}	—	March 12, 2002	Palomar	NEAT	·	4.3 km	MPC · JPL
258675	2002 EF_{129}	—	March 13, 2002	Socorro	LINEAR	·	1.2 km	MPC · JPL
258676	2002 EG_{130}	—	March 12, 2002	Anderson Mesa	LONEOS	TIR	3.8 km	MPC · JPL
258677	2002 EU_{130}	—	March 12, 2002	Kitt Peak	Spacewatch	KOR	2.1 km	MPC · JPL
258678	2002 EA_{132}	—	March 13, 2002	Kitt Peak	Spacewatch	·	2.5 km	MPC · JPL
258679	2002 EP_{147}	—	March 15, 2002	Kitt Peak	Spacewatch	·	2.4 km	MPC · JPL
258680	2002 EN_{149}	—	March 15, 2002	Palomar	NEAT	·	970 m	MPC · JPL
258681	2002 EY_{150}	—	March 15, 2002	Palomar	NEAT	·	2.9 km	MPC · JPL
258682	2002 EK_{154}	—	March 13, 2002	Socorro	LINEAR	·	1.9 km	MPC · JPL
258683	2002 EX_{154}	—	March 6, 2002	Socorro	LINEAR	L4	16 km	MPC · JPL
258684	2002 EX_{157}	—	March 13, 2002	Palomar	NEAT	L4	9.9 km	MPC · JPL
258685	2002 EK_{160}	—	March 12, 2002	Palomar	NEAT	L4	8.5 km	MPC · JPL
258686	2002 EB_{163}	—	March 5, 2002	Anderson Mesa	LONEOS	L4	10 km	MPC · JPL
258687	2002 FZ_{4}	—	March 20, 2002	Socorro	LINEAR	·	1.5 km	MPC · JPL
258688	2002 FR_{16}	—	March 16, 2002	Haleakala	NEAT	·	2.9 km	MPC · JPL
258689	2002 FO_{25}	—	March 19, 2002	Palomar	NEAT	·	6.7 km	MPC · JPL
258690	2002 FA_{33}	—	March 20, 2002	Anderson Mesa	LONEOS	·	3.7 km	MPC · JPL
258691	2002 FC_{36}	—	March 21, 2002	Socorro	LINEAR	·	3.5 km	MPC · JPL
258692	2002 FB_{38}	—	March 30, 2002	Palomar	NEAT	·	1.9 km	MPC · JPL
258693	2002 FW_{40}	—	March 20, 2002	Socorro	LINEAR	·	5.2 km	MPC · JPL
258694	2002 GM_{3}	—	April 8, 2002	Palomar	NEAT	slow	1.3 km	MPC · JPL
258695	2002 GT_{3}	—	April 8, 2002	Kitt Peak	Spacewatch	·	450 m	MPC · JPL
258696	2002 GD_{16}	—	April 15, 2002	Socorro	LINEAR	·	1.0 km	MPC · JPL
258697	2002 GN_{17}	—	April 15, 2002	Socorro	LINEAR	·	1.3 km	MPC · JPL
258698	2002 GO_{29}	—	April 7, 2002	Cerro Tololo	M. W. Buie	L4	8.8 km	MPC · JPL
258699	2002 GS_{34}	—	April 2, 2002	Palomar	NEAT	·	4.3 km	MPC · JPL
258700	2002 GE_{37}	—	April 2, 2002	Palomar	NEAT	·	2.0 km	MPC · JPL

== 258701–258800 ==
back to top

Designation			Discovery			Properties		Ref
Permanent	Provisional	Named after	Date	Site	Discoverer(s)	Category	Diam.	Ref
258701	2002 GV_{38}	—	April 2, 2002	Kitt Peak	Spacewatch	·	990 m	MPC · JPL
258702	2002 GV_{40}	—	April 4, 2002	Palomar	NEAT	NYS	1.6 km	MPC · JPL
258703	2002 GZ_{48}	—	April 4, 2002	Palomar	NEAT	·	760 m	MPC · JPL
258704	2002 GP_{55}	—	April 5, 2002	Anderson Mesa	LONEOS	·	1.2 km	MPC · JPL
258705	2002 GL_{59}	—	April 8, 2002	Palomar	NEAT	·	3.5 km	MPC · JPL
258706	2002 GU_{61}	—	April 8, 2002	Palomar	NEAT	·	970 m	MPC · JPL
258707	2002 GX_{66}	—	April 8, 2002	Palomar	NEAT	·	1.2 km	MPC · JPL
258708	2002 GV_{67}	—	April 8, 2002	Palomar	NEAT	V	750 m	MPC · JPL
258709	2002 GF_{69}	—	April 8, 2002	Palomar	NEAT	·	1.6 km	MPC · JPL
258710	2002 GZ_{69}	—	April 8, 2002	Palomar	NEAT	·	1.0 km	MPC · JPL
258711	2002 GA_{73}	—	April 9, 2002	Anderson Mesa	LONEOS	EOS	3.1 km	MPC · JPL
258712	2002 GL_{73}	—	April 9, 2002	Anderson Mesa	LONEOS	·	980 m	MPC · JPL
258713	2002 GT_{76}	—	April 8, 2002	Palomar	NEAT	·	1.2 km	MPC · JPL
258714	2002 GX_{77}	—	April 9, 2002	Socorro	LINEAR	·	1.0 km	MPC · JPL
258715	2002 GX_{78}	—	April 10, 2002	Kvistaberg	Uppsala-DLR Asteroid Survey	CYB	8.4 km	MPC · JPL
258716	2002 GM_{79}	—	April 10, 2002	Socorro	LINEAR	·	5.1 km	MPC · JPL
258717	2002 GJ_{81}	—	April 10, 2002	Socorro	LINEAR	(1298)	4.1 km	MPC · JPL
258718	2002 GB_{82}	—	April 10, 2002	Socorro	LINEAR	·	1.3 km	MPC · JPL
258719	2002 GH_{82}	—	April 10, 2002	Socorro	LINEAR	·	1.1 km	MPC · JPL
258720	2002 GH_{84}	—	April 10, 2002	Socorro	LINEAR	·	880 m	MPC · JPL
258721	2002 GS_{84}	—	April 10, 2002	Socorro	LINEAR	V	920 m	MPC · JPL
258722	2002 GW_{88}	—	April 10, 2002	Socorro	LINEAR	·	1.1 km	MPC · JPL
258723	2002 GR_{90}	—	April 8, 2002	Palomar	NEAT	·	2.0 km	MPC · JPL
258724	2002 GU_{92}	—	April 9, 2002	Socorro	LINEAR	·	1.6 km	MPC · JPL
258725	2002 GB_{97}	—	April 9, 2002	Socorro	LINEAR	NYS	950 m	MPC · JPL
258726	2002 GT_{98}	—	April 10, 2002	Socorro	LINEAR	·	1.9 km	MPC · JPL
258727	2002 GP_{101}	—	April 10, 2002	Socorro	LINEAR	·	3.8 km	MPC · JPL
258728	2002 GH_{104}	—	April 10, 2002	Socorro	LINEAR	·	4.7 km	MPC · JPL
258729	2002 GT_{117}	—	April 11, 2002	Socorro	LINEAR	·	3.2 km	MPC · JPL
258730	2002 GA_{118}	—	April 11, 2002	Socorro	LINEAR	·	1.0 km	MPC · JPL
258731	2002 GB_{120}	—	April 12, 2002	Palomar	NEAT	·	3.9 km	MPC · JPL
258732	2002 GY_{121}	—	April 10, 2002	Socorro	LINEAR	·	3.6 km	MPC · JPL
258733	2002 GB_{123}	—	April 10, 2002	Socorro	LINEAR	·	1.7 km	MPC · JPL
258734	2002 GS_{123}	—	April 11, 2002	Socorro	LINEAR	EOS	2.7 km	MPC · JPL
258735	2002 GG_{130}	—	April 12, 2002	Socorro	LINEAR	·	4.0 km	MPC · JPL
258736	2002 GV_{132}	—	April 12, 2002	Socorro	LINEAR	·	1.1 km	MPC · JPL
258737	2002 GW_{132}	—	April 12, 2002	Socorro	LINEAR	·	1.2 km	MPC · JPL
258738	2002 GQ_{148}	—	April 14, 2002	Socorro	LINEAR	·	860 m	MPC · JPL
258739	2002 GE_{151}	—	April 14, 2002	Socorro	LINEAR	EOS	3.1 km	MPC · JPL
258740	2002 GN_{152}	—	April 12, 2002	Palomar	NEAT	·	1.1 km	MPC · JPL
258741	2002 GX_{158}	—	April 13, 2002	Palomar	NEAT	·	1.3 km	MPC · JPL
258742	2002 GM_{159}	—	April 14, 2002	Socorro	LINEAR	·	1.6 km	MPC · JPL
258743	2002 GF_{161}	—	April 15, 2002	Anderson Mesa	LONEOS	·	910 m	MPC · JPL
258744	2002 GY_{161}	—	April 14, 2002	Palomar	NEAT	·	1.5 km	MPC · JPL
258745	2002 GJ_{163}	—	April 14, 2002	Palomar	NEAT	·	1.2 km	MPC · JPL
258746	2002 GH_{165}	—	April 14, 2002	Haleakala	NEAT	·	4.9 km	MPC · JPL
258747	2002 GN_{177}	—	April 5, 2002	Palomar	White, M., M. Collins	MAS	850 m	MPC · JPL
258748	2002 GR_{177}	—	April 5, 2002	Palomar	White, M., M. Collins	·	920 m	MPC · JPL
258749	2002 GZ_{177}	—	April 5, 2002	Palomar	R. Matson	·	880 m	MPC · JPL
258750	2002 GV_{178}	—	April 4, 2002	Palomar	NEAT	·	850 m	MPC · JPL
258751	2002 GK_{182}	—	April 9, 2002	Palomar	NEAT	·	740 m	MPC · JPL
258752	2002 GW_{184}	—	April 12, 2002	Palomar	NEAT	·	2.3 km	MPC · JPL
258753	2002 HL	—	April 16, 2002	Desert Eagle	W. K. Y. Yeung	·	4.8 km	MPC · JPL
258754	2002 HB_{2}	—	April 16, 2002	Socorro	LINEAR	·	1.0 km	MPC · JPL
258755	2002 HF_{3}	—	April 16, 2002	Socorro	LINEAR	THB	3.5 km	MPC · JPL
258756	2002 HR_{3}	—	April 16, 2002	Socorro	LINEAR	·	5.0 km	MPC · JPL
258757	2002 HM_{12}	—	April 20, 2002	Palomar	NEAT	·	5.2 km	MPC · JPL
258758	2002 HE_{15}	—	April 17, 2002	Socorro	LINEAR	·	2.2 km	MPC · JPL
258759	2002 HQ_{15}	—	April 17, 2002	Socorro	LINEAR	·	3.1 km	MPC · JPL
258760	2002 HW_{15}	—	April 17, 2002	Socorro	LINEAR	THM	3.1 km	MPC · JPL
258761	2002 HT_{16}	—	April 18, 2002	Palomar	NEAT	·	870 m	MPC · JPL
258762	2002 HX_{17}	—	April 17, 2002	Kitt Peak	Spacewatch	L4	14 km	MPC · JPL
258763	2002 JC_{11}	—	May 2, 2002	Anderson Mesa	LONEOS	·	1.8 km	MPC · JPL
258764	2002 JG_{17}	—	May 7, 2002	Palomar	NEAT	·	830 m	MPC · JPL
258765	2002 JT_{17}	—	May 7, 2002	Palomar	NEAT	·	3.3 km	MPC · JPL
258766	2002 JJ_{18}	—	May 7, 2002	Palomar	NEAT	·	4.6 km	MPC · JPL
258767	2002 JL_{28}	—	May 9, 2002	Socorro	LINEAR	·	1.4 km	MPC · JPL
258768	2002 JR_{28}	—	May 9, 2002	Socorro	LINEAR	·	900 m	MPC · JPL
258769	2002 JJ_{29}	—	May 9, 2002	Socorro	LINEAR	·	940 m	MPC · JPL
258770	2002 JK_{31}	—	May 9, 2002	Socorro	LINEAR	V	910 m	MPC · JPL
258771	2002 JQ_{32}	—	May 9, 2002	Socorro	LINEAR	·	1.3 km	MPC · JPL
258772	2002 JT_{42}	—	May 8, 2002	Socorro	LINEAR	·	4.5 km	MPC · JPL
258773	2002 JG_{59}	—	May 9, 2002	Socorro	LINEAR	·	1 km	MPC · JPL
258774	2002 JQ_{61}	—	May 8, 2002	Socorro	LINEAR	·	1.3 km	MPC · JPL
258775	2002 JG_{64}	—	May 9, 2002	Socorro	LINEAR	·	1.2 km	MPC · JPL
258776	2002 JL_{72}	—	May 8, 2002	Socorro	LINEAR	·	1.6 km	MPC · JPL
258777	2002 JF_{77}	—	May 11, 2002	Socorro	LINEAR	·	1.1 km	MPC · JPL
258778	2002 JZ_{78}	—	May 11, 2002	Socorro	LINEAR	EOS	2.7 km	MPC · JPL
258779	2002 JR_{79}	—	May 11, 2002	Socorro	LINEAR	·	3.3 km	MPC · JPL
258780	2002 JF_{87}	—	May 11, 2002	Socorro	LINEAR	·	1.1 km	MPC · JPL
258781	2002 JU_{87}	—	May 11, 2002	Socorro	LINEAR	·	4.4 km	MPC · JPL
258782	2002 JH_{88}	—	May 11, 2002	Socorro	LINEAR	LUT	5.9 km	MPC · JPL
258783	2002 JU_{91}	—	May 11, 2002	Socorro	LINEAR	HYG	4.7 km	MPC · JPL
258784	2002 JT_{100}	—	May 15, 2002	Nogales	Tenagra II	·	2.0 km	MPC · JPL
258785	2002 JS_{132}	—	May 9, 2002	Palomar	NEAT	HYG	3.5 km	MPC · JPL
258786	2002 JV_{134}	—	May 9, 2002	Palomar	NEAT	·	840 m	MPC · JPL
258787	2002 JD_{135}	—	May 9, 2002	Palomar	NEAT	EOS	2.8 km	MPC · JPL
258788	2002 JO_{138}	—	May 9, 2002	Palomar	NEAT	MAS	840 m	MPC · JPL
258789	2002 JC_{140}	—	May 10, 2002	Palomar	NEAT	V	900 m	MPC · JPL
258790	2002 JD_{143}	—	May 12, 2002	Palomar	NEAT	·	5.0 km	MPC · JPL
258791	2002 JF_{144}	—	May 13, 2002	Palomar	NEAT	·	5.0 km	MPC · JPL
258792	2002 JS_{146}	—	May 9, 2002	Anderson Mesa	LONEOS	PHO	1.4 km	MPC · JPL
258793	2002 KN_{13}	—	May 18, 2002	Anderson Mesa	LONEOS	·	3.6 km	MPC · JPL
258794	2002 LA	—	June 1, 2002	Socorro	LINEAR	·	4.5 km	MPC · JPL
258795	2002 LY_{2}	—	June 5, 2002	Kitt Peak	Spacewatch	·	1.1 km	MPC · JPL
258796	2002 LD_{4}	—	June 5, 2002	Socorro	LINEAR	TIR	4.3 km	MPC · JPL
258797	2002 LQ_{5}	—	June 1, 2002	Socorro	LINEAR	·	4.3 km	MPC · JPL
258798	2002 LX_{8}	—	June 5, 2002	Socorro	LINEAR	·	1.3 km	MPC · JPL
258799	2002 LA_{9}	—	June 5, 2002	Socorro	LINEAR	·	970 m	MPC · JPL
258800	2002 LR_{20}	—	June 6, 2002	Socorro	LINEAR	·	1.8 km	MPC · JPL

== 258801–258900 ==
back to top

Designation			Discovery			Properties		Ref
Permanent	Provisional	Named after	Date	Site	Discoverer(s)	Category	Diam.	Ref
258801	2002 LA_{25}	—	June 2, 2002	Palomar	NEAT	·	1.1 km	MPC · JPL
258802	2002 LK_{51}	—	June 9, 2002	Socorro	LINEAR	·	4.7 km	MPC · JPL
258803	2002 LV_{52}	—	June 8, 2002	Socorro	LINEAR	·	1.6 km	MPC · JPL
258804	2002 LT_{55}	—	June 14, 2002	Socorro	LINEAR	H	750 m	MPC · JPL
258805	2002 LX_{56}	—	June 10, 2002	Palomar	NEAT	·	1.2 km	MPC · JPL
258806	2002 LA_{61}	—	June 10, 2002	Palomar	NEAT	·	4.5 km	MPC · JPL
258807	2002 LS_{61}	—	June 1, 2002	Palomar	NEAT	·	4.7 km	MPC · JPL
258808	2002 ME	—	June 17, 2002	Socorro	LINEAR	·	880 m	MPC · JPL
258809	2002 NV_{6}	—	July 11, 2002	Campo Imperatore	CINEOS	NYS	1.4 km	MPC · JPL
258810	2002 NH_{9}	—	July 3, 2002	Palomar	NEAT	·	6.0 km	MPC · JPL
258811	2002 NN_{9}	—	July 3, 2002	Palomar	NEAT	(2076)	1.3 km	MPC · JPL
258812	2002 NJ_{14}	—	July 4, 2002	Palomar	NEAT	LIX	5.0 km	MPC · JPL
258813	2002 NO_{21}	—	July 9, 2002	Socorro	LINEAR	·	1.6 km	MPC · JPL
258814	2002 NH_{28}	—	July 9, 2002	Bergisch Gladbach	W. Bickel	NYS	1.4 km	MPC · JPL
258815	2002 NP_{34}	—	July 9, 2002	Socorro	LINEAR	·	1.8 km	MPC · JPL
258816	2002 NR_{35}	—	July 9, 2002	Socorro	LINEAR	·	1.5 km	MPC · JPL
258817	2002 NY_{57}	—	July 4, 2002	Palomar	NEAT	slow	5.0 km	MPC · JPL
258818	2002 NG_{59}	—	July 4, 2002	Palomar	NEAT	MAS	730 m	MPC · JPL
258819	2002 NH_{60}	—	July 14, 2002	Palomar	NEAT	MAS	670 m	MPC · JPL
258820	2002 NW_{62}	—	July 5, 2002	Palomar	NEAT	·	3.6 km	MPC · JPL
258821	2002 NA_{68}	—	July 15, 2002	Palomar	NEAT	·	1.2 km	MPC · JPL
258822	2002 NY_{74}	—	July 5, 2002	Palomar	NEAT	NYS	1.3 km	MPC · JPL
258823	2002 OF_{2}	—	July 17, 2002	Socorro	LINEAR	·	2.0 km	MPC · JPL
258824	2002 OM_{2}	—	July 17, 2002	Socorro	LINEAR	·	3.0 km	MPC · JPL
258825	2002 OF_{19}	—	July 22, 2002	Palomar	NEAT	PHO	4.7 km	MPC · JPL
258826	2002 OZ_{20}	—	July 22, 2002	Palomar	NEAT	MAS	970 m	MPC · JPL
258827	2002 OL_{23}	—	July 21, 2002	Palomar	NEAT	H	710 m	MPC · JPL
258828	2002 OH_{27}	—	July 22, 2002	Palomar	NEAT	·	1.9 km	MPC · JPL
258829	2002 OY_{27}	—	July 18, 2002	Palomar	NEAT	VER	5.2 km	MPC · JPL
258830	2002 OB_{28}	—	July 18, 2002	Palomar	NEAT	·	1.2 km	MPC · JPL
258831	2002 OB_{31}	—	July 29, 2002	Palomar	NEAT	ERI	1.8 km	MPC · JPL
258832	2002 PA_{10}	—	August 5, 2002	Palomar	NEAT	·	1.5 km	MPC · JPL
258833	2002 PB_{10}	—	August 5, 2002	Palomar	NEAT	·	3.9 km	MPC · JPL
258834	2002 PF_{13}	—	August 6, 2002	Palomar	NEAT	·	1.5 km	MPC · JPL
258835	2002 PH_{14}	—	August 6, 2002	Palomar	NEAT	·	1.8 km	MPC · JPL
258836	2002 PN_{14}	—	August 6, 2002	Palomar	NEAT	VER	4.0 km	MPC · JPL
258837	2002 PZ_{25}	—	August 6, 2002	Palomar	NEAT	·	1.6 km	MPC · JPL
258838	2002 PS_{26}	—	August 6, 2002	Palomar	NEAT	·	1.2 km	MPC · JPL
258839	2002 PA_{28}	—	August 6, 2002	Palomar	NEAT	·	1.7 km	MPC · JPL
258840	2002 PP_{29}	—	August 6, 2002	Palomar	NEAT	·	1.6 km	MPC · JPL
258841	2002 PP_{32}	—	August 6, 2002	Palomar	NEAT	·	1.3 km	MPC · JPL
258842	2002 PJ_{35}	—	August 6, 2002	Palomar	NEAT	NYS	1.4 km	MPC · JPL
258843	2002 PB_{63}	—	August 8, 2002	Palomar	NEAT	·	1.2 km	MPC · JPL
258844	2002 PY_{65}	—	August 5, 2002	Campo Imperatore	CINEOS	H	670 m	MPC · JPL
258845	2002 PH_{84}	—	August 10, 2002	Socorro	LINEAR	·	1.2 km	MPC · JPL
258846	2002 PE_{86}	—	August 13, 2002	Socorro	LINEAR	·	1.3 km	MPC · JPL
258847	2002 PC_{93}	—	August 14, 2002	Palomar	NEAT	H	670 m	MPC · JPL
258848	2002 PD_{95}	—	August 13, 2002	Palomar	NEAT	·	1.6 km	MPC · JPL
258849	2002 PE_{95}	—	August 13, 2002	Palomar	NEAT	·	1.8 km	MPC · JPL
258850	2002 PK_{96}	—	August 14, 2002	Socorro	LINEAR	·	2.0 km	MPC · JPL
258851	2002 PC_{99}	—	August 14, 2002	Socorro	LINEAR	·	2.1 km	MPC · JPL
258852	2002 PF_{103}	—	August 12, 2002	Socorro	LINEAR	·	1.7 km	MPC · JPL
258853	2002 PL_{105}	—	August 12, 2002	Socorro	LINEAR	·	1.6 km	MPC · JPL
258854	2002 PD_{111}	—	August 13, 2002	Anderson Mesa	LONEOS	·	1.7 km	MPC · JPL
258855	2002 PP_{117}	—	August 15, 2002	Socorro	LINEAR	·	2.0 km	MPC · JPL
258856	2002 PM_{136}	—	August 14, 2002	Socorro	LINEAR	·	1.4 km	MPC · JPL
258857	2002 PH_{139}	—	August 12, 2002	Socorro	LINEAR	·	860 m	MPC · JPL
258858	2002 PY_{139}	—	August 13, 2002	Palomar	NEAT	PHO	3.5 km	MPC · JPL
258859	2002 PJ_{142}	—	August 12, 2002	Socorro	LINEAR	H	680 m	MPC · JPL
258860	2002 PO_{154}	—	August 11, 2002	Haleakala	NEAT	NYS	1.6 km	MPC · JPL
258861	2002 PA_{156}	—	August 8, 2002	Palomar	S. F. Hönig	·	1.4 km	MPC · JPL
258862	2002 PW_{160}	—	August 8, 2002	Palomar	S. F. Hönig	·	1.3 km	MPC · JPL
258863	2002 PB_{163}	—	August 8, 2002	Palomar	S. F. Hönig	·	1.1 km	MPC · JPL
258864	2002 PF_{163}	—	August 8, 2002	Palomar	S. F. Hönig	MAS	750 m	MPC · JPL
258865	2002 PN_{164}	—	August 8, 2002	Palomar	S. F. Hönig	·	1.2 km	MPC · JPL
258866	2002 PL_{166}	—	August 15, 2002	Palomar	R. Matson	V	860 m	MPC · JPL
258867	2002 PV_{167}	—	August 11, 2002	Palomar	NEAT	NYS	1.4 km	MPC · JPL
258868	2002 PQ_{172}	—	August 7, 2002	Palomar	NEAT	·	4.0 km	MPC · JPL
258869	2002 PG_{175}	—	August 11, 2002	Palomar	NEAT	·	2.6 km	MPC · JPL
258870	2002 PD_{179}	—	August 3, 2002	Palomar	NEAT	·	1.2 km	MPC · JPL
258871	2002 PG_{179}	—	August 14, 2002	Anderson Mesa	LONEOS	·	2.0 km	MPC · JPL
258872	2002 PH_{182}	—	August 8, 2002	Palomar	NEAT	·	4.0 km	MPC · JPL
258873	2002 PO_{190}	—	August 15, 2002	Palomar	NEAT	·	1.7 km	MPC · JPL
258874	2002 PS_{190}	—	August 15, 2002	Palomar	NEAT	·	4.7 km	MPC · JPL
258875	2002 QP_{2}	—	August 16, 2002	Haleakala	NEAT	·	1.2 km	MPC · JPL
258876	2002 QG_{12}	—	August 26, 2002	Palomar	NEAT	·	1.3 km	MPC · JPL
258877	2002 QH_{14}	—	August 26, 2002	Palomar	NEAT	V	740 m	MPC · JPL
258878	2002 QD_{29}	—	August 29, 2002	Palomar	NEAT	·	1.7 km	MPC · JPL
258879	2002 QV_{29}	—	August 29, 2002	Palomar	NEAT	NYS	1.2 km	MPC · JPL
258880	2002 QM_{34}	—	August 29, 2002	Palomar	NEAT	·	1.5 km	MPC · JPL
258881	2002 QS_{44}	—	August 30, 2002	Kitt Peak	Spacewatch	·	1.9 km	MPC · JPL
258882	2002 QL_{46}	—	August 30, 2002	Palomar	NEAT	·	1.3 km	MPC · JPL
258883	2002 QA_{49}	—	August 29, 2002	Palomar	R. Matson	·	1.1 km	MPC · JPL
258884	2002 QJ_{49}	—	August 17, 2002	Palomar	S. F. Hönig	MAS	730 m	MPC · JPL
258885	2002 QP_{55}	—	August 29, 2002	Palomar	S. F. Hönig	NYS	1.1 km	MPC · JPL
258886	2002 QO_{61}	—	August 28, 2002	Palomar	NEAT	·	1.4 km	MPC · JPL
258887	2002 QV_{61}	—	August 28, 2002	Palomar	NEAT	·	1.2 km	MPC · JPL
258888	2002 QA_{63}	—	August 30, 2002	Palomar	NEAT	·	1.6 km	MPC · JPL
258889	2002 QL_{63}	—	August 18, 2002	Palomar	NEAT	NYS	1.4 km	MPC · JPL
258890	2002 QH_{64}	—	August 30, 2002	Palomar	NEAT	·	2.8 km	MPC · JPL
258891	2002 QR_{66}	—	August 29, 2002	Palomar	NEAT	·	1.3 km	MPC · JPL
258892	2002 QZ_{68}	—	August 16, 2002	Haleakala	NEAT	NYS	1.0 km	MPC · JPL
258893	2002 QL_{69}	—	August 28, 2002	Palomar	NEAT	(5)	1.7 km	MPC · JPL
258894	2002 QB_{74}	—	August 30, 2002	Palomar	NEAT	·	2.5 km	MPC · JPL
258895	2002 QQ_{75}	—	August 18, 2002	Palomar	NEAT	V	990 m	MPC · JPL
258896	2002 QW_{75}	—	August 30, 2002	Palomar	NEAT	V	740 m	MPC · JPL
258897	2002 QU_{76}	—	August 16, 2002	Palomar	NEAT	V	660 m	MPC · JPL
258898	2002 QE_{80}	—	August 16, 2002	Haleakala	NEAT	·	2.0 km	MPC · JPL
258899	2002 QZ_{85}	—	August 19, 2002	Palomar	NEAT	V	800 m	MPC · JPL
258900	2002 QH_{86}	—	August 17, 2002	Palomar	NEAT	·	1.2 km	MPC · JPL

== 258901–259000 ==
back to top

Designation			Discovery			Properties		Ref
Permanent	Provisional	Named after	Date	Site	Discoverer(s)	Category	Diam.	Ref
258901	2002 QT_{87}	—	August 27, 2002	Palomar	NEAT	·	1.3 km	MPC · JPL
258902	2002 QX_{89}	—	August 29, 2002	Palomar	NEAT	·	1.1 km	MPC · JPL
258903	2002 QA_{94}	—	August 17, 2002	Palomar	NEAT	·	1.3 km	MPC · JPL
258904	2002 QA_{100}	—	August 18, 2002	Palomar	NEAT	·	1.6 km	MPC · JPL
258905	2002 QT_{108}	—	December 12, 1999	Kitt Peak	Spacewatch	MAS	730 m	MPC · JPL
258906	2002 QQ_{112}	—	August 27, 2002	Palomar	NEAT	·	1.5 km	MPC · JPL
258907	2002 QP_{113}	—	August 27, 2002	Palomar	NEAT	SYL · CYB	5.1 km	MPC · JPL
258908	2002 QQ_{114}	—	August 28, 2002	Palomar	NEAT	·	1.3 km	MPC · JPL
258909	2002 QY_{115}	—	August 18, 2002	Palomar	NEAT	·	1.0 km	MPC · JPL
258910	2002 QL_{118}	—	August 30, 2002	Palomar	NEAT	·	1.2 km	MPC · JPL
258911	2002 QD_{129}	—	August 29, 2002	Palomar	NEAT	·	1.1 km	MPC · JPL
258912	2002 QG_{130}	—	August 30, 2002	Palomar	NEAT	V	770 m	MPC · JPL
258913	2002 QM_{132}	—	August 16, 2002	Palomar	NEAT	3:2	6.1 km	MPC · JPL
258914	2002 RP_{5}	—	September 3, 2002	Palomar	NEAT	·	1.9 km	MPC · JPL
258915	2002 RA_{10}	—	September 4, 2002	Palomar	NEAT	·	1.4 km	MPC · JPL
258916	2002 RC_{17}	—	September 4, 2002	Anderson Mesa	LONEOS	MAS	900 m	MPC · JPL
258917	2002 RH_{20}	—	September 4, 2002	Anderson Mesa	LONEOS	NYS	1.3 km	MPC · JPL
258918	2002 RS_{29}	—	September 3, 2002	Haleakala	NEAT	·	1.9 km	MPC · JPL
258919	2002 RD_{37}	—	September 5, 2002	Anderson Mesa	LONEOS	·	1.2 km	MPC · JPL
258920	2002 RB_{38}	—	September 5, 2002	Socorro	LINEAR	·	1.9 km	MPC · JPL
258921	2002 RM_{38}	—	September 5, 2002	Anderson Mesa	LONEOS	(5)	1.2 km	MPC · JPL
258922	2002 RJ_{41}	—	September 5, 2002	Socorro	LINEAR	·	1.1 km	MPC · JPL
258923	2002 RA_{42}	—	September 5, 2002	Socorro	LINEAR	MAS	940 m	MPC · JPL
258924	2002 RF_{49}	—	September 5, 2002	Socorro	LINEAR	NYS	1.4 km	MPC · JPL
258925	2002 RX_{53}	—	September 5, 2002	Socorro	LINEAR	·	1.5 km	MPC · JPL
258926	2002 RV_{60}	—	September 5, 2002	Socorro	LINEAR	·	2.6 km	MPC · JPL
258927	2002 RC_{67}	—	September 3, 2002	Palomar	NEAT	·	1.7 km	MPC · JPL
258928	2002 RL_{67}	—	September 3, 2002	Palomar	NEAT	·	2.4 km	MPC · JPL
258929	2002 RJ_{74}	—	September 5, 2002	Socorro	LINEAR	MAS	870 m	MPC · JPL
258930	2002 RJ_{77}	—	September 5, 2002	Socorro	LINEAR	·	1.6 km	MPC · JPL
258931	2002 RB_{80}	—	September 5, 2002	Socorro	LINEAR	·	1.7 km	MPC · JPL
258932	2002 RS_{88}	—	September 5, 2002	Socorro	LINEAR	V	1.0 km	MPC · JPL
258933	2002 RC_{90}	—	September 5, 2002	Socorro	LINEAR	NYS	1.6 km	MPC · JPL
258934	2002 RV_{91}	—	September 5, 2002	Socorro	LINEAR	(5)	1.2 km	MPC · JPL
258935	2002 RL_{95}	—	September 5, 2002	Socorro	LINEAR	·	1.4 km	MPC · JPL
258936	2002 RX_{126}	—	September 10, 2002	Palomar	NEAT	·	6.0 km	MPC · JPL
258937	2002 RO_{128}	—	September 10, 2002	Palomar	NEAT	·	2.0 km	MPC · JPL
258938	2002 RO_{136}	—	September 11, 2002	Haleakala	NEAT	V	1.0 km	MPC · JPL
258939	2002 RG_{142}	—	September 11, 2002	Palomar	NEAT	·	1.7 km	MPC · JPL
258940	2002 RA_{144}	—	September 11, 2002	Palomar	NEAT	·	1.6 km	MPC · JPL
258941	2002 RD_{160}	—	September 12, 2002	Palomar	NEAT	V	860 m	MPC · JPL
258942	2002 RG_{160}	—	September 12, 2002	Palomar	NEAT	V	900 m	MPC · JPL
258943	2002 RV_{160}	—	September 12, 2002	Palomar	NEAT	·	1.1 km	MPC · JPL
258944	2002 RV_{169}	—	September 13, 2002	Palomar	NEAT	·	1.7 km	MPC · JPL
258945	2002 RF_{206}	—	September 14, 2002	Palomar	NEAT	·	1.7 km	MPC · JPL
258946	2002 RJ_{206}	—	September 14, 2002	Palomar	NEAT	·	2.1 km	MPC · JPL
258947	2002 RT_{210}	—	September 15, 2002	Kitt Peak	Spacewatch	·	1.7 km	MPC · JPL
258948	2002 RN_{211}	—	September 15, 2002	Haleakala	NEAT	·	1.8 km	MPC · JPL
258949	2002 RK_{215}	—	September 13, 2002	Socorro	LINEAR	·	1.6 km	MPC · JPL
258950	2002 RU_{219}	—	September 15, 2002	Palomar	NEAT	·	1.1 km	MPC · JPL
258951	2002 RF_{220}	—	September 15, 2002	Palomar	NEAT	·	2.9 km	MPC · JPL
258952	2002 RS_{221}	—	September 15, 2002	Haleakala	NEAT	NYS	1.7 km	MPC · JPL
258953	2002 RV_{235}	—	September 11, 2002	Palomar	White, M., M. Collins	·	4.7 km	MPC · JPL
258954	2002 RH_{238}	—	September 9, 2002	Haleakala	R. Matson	·	1.3 km	MPC · JPL
258955	2002 RE_{239}	—	September 8, 2002	Haleakala	R. Matson	MAR	1.4 km	MPC · JPL
258956	2002 RK_{245}	—	September 15, 2002	Palomar	NEAT	NYS	1.5 km	MPC · JPL
258957	2002 RY_{252}	—	September 15, 2002	Palomar	NEAT	·	1.4 km	MPC · JPL
258958	2002 RS_{259}	—	September 15, 2002	Palomar	NEAT	·	1.2 km	MPC · JPL
258959	2002 RJ_{277}	—	September 15, 2002	Palomar	NEAT	·	1.4 km	MPC · JPL
258960	2002 RY_{279}	—	September 14, 2002	Palomar	NEAT	·	1.4 km	MPC · JPL
258961	2002 SN_{1}	—	September 26, 2002	Palomar	NEAT	·	1.7 km	MPC · JPL
258962	2002 SJ_{8}	—	September 27, 2002	Palomar	NEAT	·	930 m	MPC · JPL
258963	2002 SA_{13}	—	September 27, 2002	Palomar	NEAT	H	640 m	MPC · JPL
258964	2002 SF_{13}	—	September 27, 2002	Palomar	NEAT	H	760 m	MPC · JPL
258965	2002 SM_{21}	—	September 26, 2002	Palomar	NEAT	·	1.1 km	MPC · JPL
258966	2002 SB_{23}	—	September 27, 2002	Palomar	NEAT	·	1.2 km	MPC · JPL
258967	2002 SZ_{28}	—	September 27, 2002	Palomar	NEAT	MAS	920 m	MPC · JPL
258968	2002 SQ_{32}	—	September 28, 2002	Haleakala	NEAT	·	2.8 km	MPC · JPL
258969	2002 SF_{33}	—	September 28, 2002	Haleakala	NEAT	·	1.4 km	MPC · JPL
258970	2002 SZ_{33}	—	September 29, 2002	Haleakala	NEAT	NYS	1.4 km	MPC · JPL
258971	2002 SL_{37}	—	September 29, 2002	Haleakala	NEAT	·	1.5 km	MPC · JPL
258972	2002 SS_{38}	—	September 30, 2002	Socorro	LINEAR	NYS	1.6 km	MPC · JPL
258973	2002 ST_{41}	—	September 28, 2002	Palomar	NEAT	H	690 m	MPC · JPL
258974	2002 SD_{44}	—	September 29, 2002	Haleakala	NEAT	·	1.5 km	MPC · JPL
258975	2002 SV_{54}	—	September 30, 2002	Haleakala	NEAT	·	2.0 km	MPC · JPL
258976	2002 SX_{57}	—	September 30, 2002	Haleakala	NEAT	·	1.6 km	MPC · JPL
258977	2002 SB_{64}	—	September 27, 2002	Palomar	NEAT	·	2.7 km	MPC · JPL
258978	2002 SL_{67}	—	September 27, 2002	Palomar	NEAT	H	550 m	MPC · JPL
258979	2002 SQ_{70}	—	September 17, 2002	Palomar	NEAT	·	3.7 km	MPC · JPL
258980	2002 SN_{71}	—	September 26, 2002	Palomar	NEAT	·	1 km	MPC · JPL
258981	2002 TP_{5}	—	October 1, 2002	Anderson Mesa	LONEOS	NYS	1.4 km	MPC · JPL
258982	2002 TP_{7}	—	October 1, 2002	Socorro	LINEAR	MAS	1.2 km	MPC · JPL
258983	2002 TQ_{10}	—	October 2, 2002	Haleakala	NEAT	·	1.5 km	MPC · JPL
258984	2002 TE_{18}	—	October 2, 2002	Socorro	LINEAR	PHO	1.3 km	MPC · JPL
258985	2002 TO_{24}	—	October 2, 2002	Socorro	LINEAR	EUN	1.4 km	MPC · JPL
258986	2002 TP_{28}	—	October 2, 2002	Socorro	LINEAR	PHO	1.3 km	MPC · JPL
258987	2002 TH_{29}	—	October 2, 2002	Socorro	LINEAR	MAS	1.0 km	MPC · JPL
258988	2002 TB_{32}	—	October 2, 2002	Socorro	LINEAR	·	1.5 km	MPC · JPL
258989	2002 TR_{33}	—	October 2, 2002	Socorro	LINEAR	·	1.5 km	MPC · JPL
258990	2002 TA_{37}	—	October 2, 2002	Socorro	LINEAR	·	1.3 km	MPC · JPL
258991	2002 TP_{48}	—	October 2, 2002	Socorro	LINEAR	·	1.5 km	MPC · JPL
258992	2002 TU_{48}	—	October 2, 2002	Socorro	LINEAR	·	1.6 km	MPC · JPL
258993	2002 TN_{53}	—	October 2, 2002	Socorro	LINEAR	MAS	1.4 km	MPC · JPL
258994	2002 TH_{60}	—	October 3, 2002	Palomar	NEAT	H	620 m	MPC · JPL
258995	2002 TC_{63}	—	October 3, 2002	Campo Imperatore	CINEOS	·	2.4 km	MPC · JPL
258996	2002 TS_{65}	—	October 3, 2002	Socorro	LINEAR	·	1.7 km	MPC · JPL
258997	2002 TQ_{68}	—	October 7, 2002	Haleakala	NEAT	·	2.1 km	MPC · JPL
258998	2002 TD_{69}	—	October 8, 2002	Haleakala	NEAT	H	800 m	MPC · JPL
258999	2002 TZ_{74}	—	October 1, 2002	Anderson Mesa	LONEOS	V	970 m	MPC · JPL
259000	2002 TE_{92}	—	October 3, 2002	Socorro	LINEAR	·	1.2 km	MPC · JPL

back to top

== See also ==
- Meanings of minor-planet names: 258001–259000
