= List of named minor planets: 250000–299999 =

This is a partial list of named minor planets in numerical order. It contains a total of 439 entries as of 19 October 2026. Minor planets for which no article exist are displayed in grey color and redirect to the list of minor planets (see List of minor planets § Main index).

== From 250,000 to 299,999 ==
- 250164 Hannsruder
- 250354 Lewicdeparis
- 250370 Obertocitterio
- 250374 Jírovec
- 250526 Steinerzsuzsanna
- 250606 Bichat
- 250719 Jurajbardy
- 250774 Syosset
- 250840 Motörhead
- 250955 Sorena
- 251001 Sluch
- 251014 Bejczyantal
- 251015 Gregusspál
- 251018 Liubirena
- 251325 Leopoldjosefine
- 251449 Olexakorolʹ
- 251485 Bois-d'Amont
- 251512 Jacobcollier
- 251595 Rudolfböttger
- 251619 Ravenna
- 251621 Lüthen
- 251625 Timconrow
- 251627 Joyceearl
- 251633 Kivelson
- 251638 Kianamcfadden
- 251642 Leonardodicaprio
- 252470 Puigmarti
- 252794 Maironis
- 253412 Ráskaylea
- 253536 Tymchenko
- 253587 Cloutier
- 254000 Johncryan
- 254299 Shambleau
- 254422 Henrykent
- 254749 Kurosawa
- 254846 Csontváry
- 254863 Robinwarren
- 254876 Strommer
- 255019 Fleurmaxwell
- 255073 Victoriabond
- 255257 Mechwart
- 255261 Kubovics
- 255308 Christianzuber
- 255587 Gardenia
- 255598 Paullauterbur
- 255703 Stetson
- 255940 Maylis
- 255989 Dengyushian
- 256369 Vilain
- 256374 Danielpequignot
- 256537 Zahn
- 256547 Davidesmith
- 256697 Nahapetov
- 256698 Zhuzhixin
- 256699 Poudai
- 256795 Suzyzahn
- 256796 Almanzor
- 256797 Benbow
- 256813 Marburg
- 256892 Wutayou
- 257005 Arpadpal
- 257084 Joanalcover
- 257211 Kulizoli
- 257212 Rózsahegyi
- 257234 Güntherkurtze
- 257248 Chouchiehlun
- 257261 Ovechkin
- 257296 Jessicaamy
- 257336 Noeliasanchez
- 257371 Miguelbello
- 257425 Davykirkpatrick
- 257430 Chrisgelino
- 257437 Schuylervandyk
- 257438 Marcyharbut
- 257439 Peppeprosperini
- 257515 Zapperudi
- 257533 Iquique
- 258323 Róbertbarsa
- 259344 Paré
- 259387 Atauta
- 259905 Vougeot
- 260098 Staargyula
- 260235 Attwood
- 260366 Quanah
- 260508 Alagna
- 260601 Wesselényi
- 260676 Évethurière
- 260724 Malherbe
- 260824 Hermanus
- 260886 Henritudor
- 260906 Robichon
- 261107 Cameroncasimir
- 261108 Obanhelian
- 261109 Annie
- 261110 Neoma
- 261291 Fucecchio
- 261690 Jodorowsky
- 261930 Moorhead
- 261936 Liulin
- 262106 Margaretryan
- 262284 Kanišauskas
- 262295 Jeffrich
- 262418 Samofalov
- 262419 Suzaka
- 262536 Nowikow
- 262705 Vosne-Romanée
- 262825 Dianearbus
- 262876 Davidlynch
- 262972 Petermansfield
- 263251 Pandabear
- 263255 Jultayu
- 263349 Ivanslyota
- 263391 Grüntzig
- 263516 Alexescu
- 263613 Enol
- 263844 Johnfarrell
- 263906 Yuanfengfang
- 263932 Speyer
- 263940 Malyshkina
- 264020 Stuttgart
- 264033 Boris-Mikhail
- 264045 Heinerklinkrad
- 264061 Vitebsk
- 264068 Gudzinevičiūtė
- 264077 Dluzhnevskaya
- 264119 Georgeorton
- 264131 Bornim
- 264150 Dolops
- 264165 Poehler
- 264474 Rogerclark
- 264476 Aepic
- 265059 Bajorgizi
- 265380 Terzan
- 265490 Szabados
- 265594 Keletiágnes
- 265924 Franceclemente
- 266051 Hannawieser
- 266081 Villyket
- 266286 Bodenmüller
- 266465 Andalucia
- 266622 Málna
- 266646 Zaphod
- 266710 Pedrettiadriana
- 266711 Tuttlingen
- 266725 Vonputtkamer
- 266854 Sezenaksu
- 266887 Wolfgangries
- 266921 Culhane
- 266983 Josepbosch
- 267003 Burkert
- 267017 Yangzhifa
- 267585 Popluhár
- 268057 Michaelkaschke
- 268115 Williamalbrecht
- 268242 Pebble
- 268669 Bunun
- 268686 Elenaaprile
- 269232 Tahin
- 269243 Charbonnel
- 269245 Catastini
- 269251 Kolomna
- 269252 Bogdanstupka
- 269300 Diego
- 269323 Madisonvillehigh
- 269390 Igortkachenko
- 269484 Marcia
- 269485 Bisikalo
- 269548 Fratyu
- 269550 Chur
- 269567 Bakhtinov
- 269589 Kryachko
- 269742 Kroónorbert
- 269762 Nocentini
- 270373 William
- 270374 Paolomanente
- 270472 Csörgei
- 270553 Loureed
- 270556 Kolonica
- 270558 Nemiroff
- 270584 Vlasta
- 270588 Laurieanderson
- 270601 Frauenstein
- 270725 Evka
- 270903 Pakštienė
- 270984 Dikschmidt
- 271009 Reitterferenc
- 271216 Boblambert
- 271235 Bellay
- 271763 Hebrewu
- 272209 Corsica
- 272746 Paoladiomede
- 273230 de Bruyn
- 273262 Cottam
- 273273 Piwowarski
- 273412 Eduardomissoni
- 273836 Hoijyusek
- 273936 Tangjingchuan
- 273987 Greggwade
- 273994 Cinqueterre
- 274020 Skywalker
- 274021 Monikapoeller
- 274084 Baldone
- 274137 Angelaglinos
- 274213 Satriani
- 274246 Reggiacaserta
- 274264 Piccolomini
- 274290 Lechnerödön
- 274300 UNESCO
- 274301 Wikipedia
- 274302 Abaházi
- 274333 Voznyukigor
- 274334 Kyivplaniy
- 274472 Pietà
- 274810 Fedáksári
- 274835 Aachen
- 274843 Mykhailopetrenko
- 274856 Rosendosalvado
- 274860 Emilylakdawalla
- 274928 von Weinberg
- 274981 Petrsu
- 275106 Sarahdubeyjames
- 275215 Didiermarouani
- 275225 Kotarbinski
- 275264 Krisztike
- 275281 Amywalsh
- 275786 Bouley
- 275962 Chalverat
- 276163 Tafreshi
- 276389 Winkel
- 276568 Joestübler
- 276681 Loremaes
- 276781 Montchaibeux
- 276975 Heller
- 277106 Forgó
- 277118 Zaandam
- 277816 Varese
- 277883 Basu
- 278141 Tatooine
- 278197 Touvron
- 278200 Olegpopov
- 278225 Didierpelat
- 278360 Tangdingyuan
- 278384 Mudanjiang
- 278386 Sofivanna
- 278417 Kerschbaum
- 278447 Saviano
- 278513 Schwope
- 278591 Salò
- 278609 Avrudenko
- 278640 Elenačernienė
- 278645 Kontsevych
- 278690 Rockenbauer
- 278735 Kamioka
- 278956 Shei-Pa
- 278986 Chenshuchu
- 279035 Mara
- 279037 Utezimmer
- 279119 Khamatova
- 279226 Demisroussos
- 279274 Shurpakov
- 279377 Lechmankiewicz
- 279397 Dombeck
- 279410 McCallon
- 279723 Wittenberg
- 280244 Ati
- 280640 Ruetsch
- 280641 Edosara
- 280642 Doubs
- 280652 Aimaku
- 280686 Jasevičius
- 280924 Eurypterus
- 281007 Oliviaperrotto
- 281067 Barmby
- 281068 Chipolin
- 281105 Dionneross
- 281140 Trier
- 281208 Žebrauskas
- 281247 Egryjózsef
- 281272 Arnaudleroy
- 281445 Scotthowe
- 281459 Kyrylenko
- 281507 Johnellen
- 281561 Taitung
- 281564 Fuhsiehhai
- 281569 Taea
- 281661 Michaelsiems
- 281764 Schwetzingen
- 281772 Matttaylor
- 281820 Monnaves
- 281880 Wuweiren
- 282034 Torinodisangro
- 282630 Caroljones
- 282669 Erguël
- 282897 Kaltenbrunner
- 282903 Masada
- 283057 Casteldipiazza
- 283117 Bonn
- 283141 Dittsche
- 283142 Weena
- 283277 Faber
- 283279 Qianweichang
- 283455 Philipkrider
- 283461 Leacipaola
- 283786 Rutebeuf
- 283990 Randallrosenfeld
- 284029 Esplugafrancolí
- 284054 Keeling
- 284357 Semseyandor
- 284891 Kona
- 284919 Kaçar
- 284945 Saint-Imier
- 284984 Ikaunieks
- 284996 Rosaparks
- 285937 Anthonytaylor
- 286162 Tatarka
- 286163 Begeni
- 286693 Kodaitis
- 286841 Annemieke
- 286842 Joris
- 287347 Mézes
- 287374 Vreeland
- 287432 Bril
- 287433 de Groot
- 287693 Hugonnaivilma
- 287711 Filotáslili
- 287787 Karády
- 287829 Juancarlos
- 287875 Pavlokorsun
- 288478 Fahlman
- 288615 Tempesti
- 288959 Biržai
- 288960 Steponasdarius
- 288961 Stasysgirėnas
- 289020 Ukmergė
- 289021 Juzeliūnas
- 289085 Andreweil
- 289116 Zurbuchen
- 289121 Druskininkai
- 289314 Chisholm
- 289586 Shackleton
- 289587 Chantdugros
- 289600 Tastevin
- 289608 Wanli
- 289992 Onfray
- 290001 Uebersax
- 290074 Donasadock
- 290127 Linakostenko
- 290129 Rátzlászló
- 290156 Houde
- 290180 Pattiekletter
- 290181 Sigut
- 291325 de Tyard
- 291387 Katiebouman
- 291633 Heyun
- 291824 Cami
- 291847 Ladoix
- 291849 Orchestralondon
- 291855 Calabròcorrado
- 291921 Rott
- 291923 Kuzmaskryabin
- 292051 Bohlender
- 292159 Jongoldstein
- 292160 Davefask
- 292343 Yasuosato
- 292352 Nicolinha
- 292459 Antoniolasciac
- 292490 Sienkiewicz
- 292856 Peeters
- 292872 Anoushankar
- 292991 Lyonne
- 293131 Meteora
- 293366 Roux
- 293383 Maigret
- 293477 Teotihuacan
- 293499 Wolinski
- 293707 Govoradloanatoly
- 293787 Mucunbo
- 293809 Zugspitze
- 293878 Tapping
- 293909 Matterhorn
- 293926 Harrystine
- 293934 MPIA
- 293985 Franquin
- 294077 Ingridsteeger
- 294204 Guinan
- 294295 Brodardmarc
- 294296 Efeso
- 294402 Joeorr
- 294595 Shingareva
- 294600 Abedinabedin
- 294664 Trakai
- 294727 Dennisritchie
- 294814 Nataliakidalova
- 295299 Nannidiana
- 295471 Herbertnitsch
- 295472 Puy
- 295473 Cochard
- 295492 Adrianprakhov
- 295565 Hannover
- 295841 Gorbulin
- 295935 Majia
- 296351 Linyongbin
- 296446 Gregorstadler
- 296462 Corylachlan
- 296525 Milanovskiy
- 296577 Arkhangelsk
- 296587 Ocaña
- 296638 Sergeibelov
- 296753 Mustafamahmoud
- 296819 Artesian
- 296820 Paju
- 296905 Korochantsev
- 296907 Alexander
- 296928 Francescopalla
- 296930 McLaren
- 296945 Ronaldlaub
- 296950 Robertbauer
- 296968 Ignatianum
- 296987 Piotrflin
- 297005 Ellirichter
- 297026 Corton
- 297082 Bygott
- 297161 Subuchin
- 297314 Ilterracottaio
- 297409 Mållgan
- 298232 Ericlimburg
- 298762 Sarahgallagher
- 298877 Michaelreynolds
- 299020 Chennaoui
- 299134 Moggicecchi
- 299362 Marthacole
- 299518 Metchev
- 299631 Kayliegreen
- 299755 Ericmontellese
- 299756 Kerryaileen
- 299777 Tanyastreeter
- 299785 Alexeymolchanov
- 299792 Celeritas
- 299897 Skipitis
back to top

== See also ==
- List of minor planet discoverers
- List of observatory codes
- Meanings of minor planet names § Index
