= Meanings of minor-planet names: 270001–271000 =

As minor planet discoveries are confirmed, they are given a permanent number by the IAU's Minor Planet Center (MPC), and the discoverers can then submit names for them, following the IAU's naming conventions. The list below concerns those minor planets in the specified number-range that have received names, and explains the meanings of those names.

Official naming citations of newly named small Solar System bodies are approved and published in a bulletin by IAU's Working Group for Small Bodies Nomenclature (WGSBN). Before May 2021, citations were published in MPC's Minor Planet Circulars for many decades. Recent citations can also be found on the JPL Small-Body Database (SBDB). Until his death in 2016, German astronomer Lutz D. Schmadel compiled these citations into the Dictionary of Minor Planet Names (DMP) and regularly updated the collection.

Based on Paul Herget's The Names of the Minor Planets, Schmadel also researched the unclear origin of numerous asteroids, most of which had been named prior to World War II. This article incorporates text from this source, which is in the public domain: SBDB New namings may only be added to this list below after official publication as the preannouncement of names is condemned. The WGSBN publishes a comprehensive guideline for the naming rules of non-cometary small Solar System bodies.

== 270001–270100 ==
Named minor planet	Provisional	This minor planet was named for...	Ref · Catalog
There are no named minor planets in this number range

== 270101–270200 ==
back to top

Named minor planet	Provisional	This minor planet was named for...	Ref · Catalog
There are no named minor planets in this number range

== 270201–270300 ==
back to top

Named minor planet	Provisional	This minor planet was named for...	Ref · Catalog
There are no named minor planets in this number range

== 270301–270400 ==
back to top

Named minor planet	Provisional	This minor planet was named for...	Ref · Catalog
270373 William	2002 AE_{3}	William Edmonds (born 1945), a software engineer at NASA	JPL · 270373
270374 Paolomanente	2002 AB_{12}	Paolo Manente (born 1947), retired Italian oncologist and former head and director of the Unità Operativa di Oncologia Medica in Castelfranco Veneto.	JPL · 270374

== 270401–270500 ==
back to top

Named minor planet	Provisional	This minor planet was named for...	Ref · Catalog
270472 Csörgei	2002 CS_{316}	Tibor Csörgei (born 1972), a Slovak amateur astronomer and observer of meteors, comets and asteroids.	JPL · 270472

== 270501–270600 ==
back to top

Named minor planet	Provisional	This minor planet was named for...	Ref · Catalog
270553 Loureed	2002 GG_{178}	Lou Reed (1942–2013), an American musician, singer and songwriter	JPL · 270553
270556 Kolonica	2002 GX_{182}	Kolonica, a small Slovak village near the location of the 1-meter Vihorlat National Telescope (VNT) at Kolonica Saddle (Src). Kolonica's inhabitants were very helpful during the observatory construction and still participate often in astronomical activities.	JPL · 270556
270558 Nemiroff	2002 GB_{185}	Robert J. Nemiroff (b. 1960), an American physicist.	IAU · 270558
270584 Vlasta	2002 JG_{150}	Vlasta Suchanová (b. 1964), a nature-loving Slovakian lawyer.	IAU · 270584
270588 Laurieanderson	2006 SE_{368}	Laurie Anderson (b. 1947), an American musician, composer, visual artist, writer, and director.	IAU · 270588

== 270601–270700 ==
back to top

Named minor planet	Provisional	This minor planet was named for...	Ref · Catalog
270601 Frauenstein	2002 NN_{57}	Frauenstein, a small city on the crest of the Ore Mountains in Saxony, Germany.	JPL · 270601

== 270701–270800 ==
back to top

Named minor planet	Provisional	This minor planet was named for...	Ref · Catalog
270725 Evka	2002 QL_{122}	Eva Morvayová (born 1979), a Slovak amateur astronomer and visual observer, who is a member of the Astronomy Club in Nové Zámky, Slovakia.	IAU · 270725

== 270801–270900 ==
back to top

Named minor planet	Provisional	This minor planet was named for...	Ref · Catalog
There are no named minor planets in this number range

== 270901–271000 ==
back to top

Named minor planet	Provisional	This minor planet was named for...	Ref · Catalog
270903 Pakštienė	2002 TO_{303}	Erika Pakstiene (born 1971), a Lithuanian astronomer and expert in stellar photometry of variable stars, eclipsing binaries, transiting exoplanets, microlensed objects, and rotating asteroids. Known for her work in asteroseismology of variable stars, she has authored more than 80 scientific papers and written many popular science articles.	IAU · 270903
270984 Dikschmidt	2002 WF_{28}	Dik Schmidt (1909–1992), Dutch pharmacist and amateur astronomer who was chair of the Dutch Working Group for Occultations from 1973 to 1986.	JPL · 270984

back to top

Preceded by 269,001–270,000	Meanings of minor-planet names List of minor planets: 270,001–271,000	Succeeded by 271,001–272,000
