= List of minor planets: 270001–271000 =

The following is a partial list of minor planets, running from minor-planet number 270001 through 271000, inclusive. The primary data for this and other partial lists is based on JPL's "Small-Body Orbital Elements" and data available from the Minor Planet Center. Critical list information is also provided by the MPC, unless otherwise specified from Lowell Observatory. A detailed description of the table's columns and additional sources are given on the main page including a complete list of every page in this series, and a statistical break-up on the dynamical classification of minor planets.

Also see the summary list of all named bodies in numerical and alphabetical order, and the corresponding naming citations for the number range of this particular list. New namings may only be added to this list after official publication, as the preannouncement of names is condemned by the Working Group for Small Bodies Nomenclature of the International Astronomical Union.

Near-Earth obj.	MBA (inner)	MBA (outer)	Centaur
Mars-crosser	MBA (middle)	Jupiter trojan	Trans-Neptunian obj.
Unclassified

== 270001–270100 ==
Designation			Discovery			Properties		Ref
Permanent	Provisional	Named after	Date	Site	Discoverer(s)	Category	Diam.	Ref
270001	2001 AH	—	January 1, 2001	Kitt Peak	Spacewatch	·	3.0 km	MPC · JPL
270002	2001 AT_{8}	—	January 2, 2001	Socorro	LINEAR	·	3.5 km	MPC · JPL
270003	2001 AF_{32}	—	January 4, 2001	Socorro	LINEAR	·	3.0 km	MPC · JPL
270004	2001 BR_{23}	—	January 20, 2001	Socorro	LINEAR	·	1.7 km	MPC · JPL
270005	2001 BB_{55}	—	January 19, 2001	Socorro	LINEAR	·	2.2 km	MPC · JPL
270006	2001 BN_{65}	—	January 26, 2001	Socorro	LINEAR	·	3.2 km	MPC · JPL
270007	2001 DT_{17}	—	February 16, 2001	Socorro	LINEAR	·	1.1 km	MPC · JPL
270008	2001 DO_{34}	—	February 19, 2001	Socorro	LINEAR	·	3.0 km	MPC · JPL
270009	2001 DD_{58}	—	February 21, 2001	Kitt Peak	Spacewatch	·	2.7 km	MPC · JPL
270010	2001 DD_{73}	—	February 19, 2001	Socorro	LINEAR	·	4.0 km	MPC · JPL
270011	2001 DB_{76}	—	February 20, 2001	Socorro	LINEAR	·	3.1 km	MPC · JPL
270012	2001 DG_{111}	—	February 19, 2001	Anderson Mesa	LONEOS	·	1.1 km	MPC · JPL
270013	2001 EH_{24}	—	March 3, 2001	Socorro	LINEAR	·	4.4 km	MPC · JPL
270014	2001 EO_{25}	—	March 14, 2001	Kitt Peak	Spacewatch	KOR	2.0 km	MPC · JPL
270015	2001 FV_{23}	—	March 21, 2001	Anderson Mesa	LONEOS	·	1.0 km	MPC · JPL
270016	2001 FV_{47}	—	March 18, 2001	Socorro	LINEAR	PHO	1.2 km	MPC · JPL
270017	2001 FU_{83}	—	March 26, 2001	Kitt Peak	Spacewatch	·	790 m	MPC · JPL
270018	2001 FX_{84}	—	March 26, 2001	Kitt Peak	Spacewatch	KOR	1.7 km	MPC · JPL
270019	2001 FA_{86}	—	March 26, 2001	Cerro Tololo	Deep Lens Survey	·	990 m	MPC · JPL
270020	2001 FZ_{90}	—	March 26, 2001	Socorro	LINEAR	·	1.1 km	MPC · JPL
270021	2001 FS_{119}	—	March 27, 2001	Kitt Peak	Spacewatch	EOS	2.6 km	MPC · JPL
270022	2001 FF_{173}	—	March 21, 2001	Kitt Peak	Spacewatch	KOR	1.8 km	MPC · JPL
270023	2001 FO_{187}	—	March 20, 2001	Kitt Peak	Spacewatch	·	3.3 km	MPC · JPL
270024	2001 HW_{17}	—	April 24, 2001	Kitt Peak	Spacewatch	·	1.2 km	MPC · JPL
270025	2001 HP_{21}	—	April 23, 2001	Socorro	LINEAR	·	1.3 km	MPC · JPL
270026	2001 HD_{47}	—	April 18, 2001	Kitt Peak	Spacewatch	·	5.4 km	MPC · JPL
270027	2001 JS	—	May 10, 2001	Ondřejov	L. Kotková	·	830 m	MPC · JPL
270028	2001 JU_{7}	—	May 15, 2001	Anderson Mesa	LONEOS	·	4.1 km	MPC · JPL
270029	2001 JF_{8}	—	May 15, 2001	Anderson Mesa	LONEOS	·	940 m	MPC · JPL
270030	2001 KT	—	May 17, 2001	Socorro	LINEAR	PHO	1.5 km	MPC · JPL
270031	2001 KW_{13}	—	May 17, 2001	Socorro	LINEAR	·	1.3 km	MPC · JPL
270032	2001 KA_{19}	—	May 22, 2001	Socorro	LINEAR	PHO	1.8 km	MPC · JPL
270033	2001 KN_{30}	—	May 21, 2001	Socorro	LINEAR	·	4.4 km	MPC · JPL
270034	2001 KR_{31}	—	May 22, 2001	Socorro	LINEAR	T_{j} (2.93)	4.4 km	MPC · JPL
270035	2001 KF_{33}	—	May 22, 2001	Bergisch Gladbach	W. Bickel	·	3.2 km	MPC · JPL
270036	2001 KR_{41}	—	May 24, 2001	Prescott	P. G. Comba	·	1.1 km	MPC · JPL
270037	2001 KR_{57}	—	May 25, 2001	Socorro	LINEAR	·	1.1 km	MPC · JPL
270038	2001 KW_{65}	—	May 22, 2001	Anderson Mesa	LONEOS	·	1.7 km	MPC · JPL
270039	2001 KC_{74}	—	May 25, 2001	Kitt Peak	Spacewatch	·	1.2 km	MPC · JPL
270040	2001 LG_{7}	—	June 15, 2001	Socorro	LINEAR	·	3.3 km	MPC · JPL
270041	2001 LU_{7}	—	June 15, 2001	Palomar	NEAT	·	3.8 km	MPC · JPL
270042	2001 LB_{18}	—	June 15, 2001	Palomar	NEAT	PHO	1.3 km	MPC · JPL
270043	2001 MM_{2}	—	June 19, 2001	Socorro	LINEAR	PHO	1.8 km	MPC · JPL
270044	2001 ML_{3}	—	June 20, 2001	Anderson Mesa	LONEOS	·	1.6 km	MPC · JPL
270045	2001 MK_{16}	—	June 27, 2001	Palomar	NEAT	·	940 m	MPC · JPL
270046	2001 MS_{16}	—	June 27, 2001	Palomar	NEAT	·	840 m	MPC · JPL
270047	2001 MY_{21}	—	June 28, 2001	Palomar	NEAT	V	800 m	MPC · JPL
270048	2001 MX_{25}	—	June 19, 2001	Palomar	NEAT	·	1.8 km	MPC · JPL
270049	2001 NT_{11}	—	July 12, 2001	Palomar	NEAT	·	4.6 km	MPC · JPL
270050	2001 OR	—	July 18, 2001	Palomar	NEAT	H	770 m	MPC · JPL
270051	2001 OF_{11}	—	July 20, 2001	Palomar	NEAT	·	1.0 km	MPC · JPL
270052	2001 OG_{16}	—	July 21, 2001	Palomar	NEAT	·	1.6 km	MPC · JPL
270053	2001 OY_{29}	—	July 19, 2001	Palomar	NEAT	V	930 m	MPC · JPL
270054	2001 OM_{37}	—	July 20, 2001	Palomar	NEAT	·	5.2 km	MPC · JPL
270055	2001 OB_{39}	—	July 20, 2001	Palomar	NEAT	·	1.5 km	MPC · JPL
270056	2001 OJ_{41}	—	July 21, 2001	Palomar	NEAT	·	1.5 km	MPC · JPL
270057	2001 OG_{54}	—	July 21, 2001	Palomar	NEAT	H ·	790 m	MPC · JPL
270058	2001 OY_{54}	—	July 22, 2001	Palomar	NEAT	·	1.7 km	MPC · JPL
270059	2001 OA_{76}	—	July 27, 2001	Haleakala	NEAT	NYS	1.1 km	MPC · JPL
270060	2001 OY_{78}	—	July 26, 2001	Palomar	NEAT	PHO	1.3 km	MPC · JPL
270061	2001 OQ_{83}	—	July 27, 2001	Palomar	NEAT	·	1.3 km	MPC · JPL
270062	2001 OY_{86}	—	July 29, 2001	Palomar	NEAT	·	1.6 km	MPC · JPL
270063	2001 OF_{90}	—	July 23, 2001	Haleakala	NEAT	·	1.4 km	MPC · JPL
270064	2001 OJ_{90}	—	July 25, 2001	Haleakala	NEAT	PHO	2.9 km	MPC · JPL
270065	2001 OG_{91}	—	July 29, 2001	Palomar	NEAT	·	3.8 km	MPC · JPL
270066	2001 OQ_{92}	—	July 22, 2001	Palomar	NEAT	·	1.2 km	MPC · JPL
270067	2001 PU_{14}	—	August 14, 2001	Ondřejov	P. Kušnirák	·	1.3 km	MPC · JPL
270068	2001 PS_{18}	—	August 9, 2001	Palomar	NEAT	·	1.3 km	MPC · JPL
270069	2001 PQ_{25}	—	August 11, 2001	Haleakala	NEAT	(5)	1.5 km	MPC · JPL
270070	2001 PS_{30}	—	August 10, 2001	Palomar	NEAT	·	5.5 km	MPC · JPL
270071	2001 PM_{44}	—	August 15, 2001	Haleakala	NEAT	·	1.0 km	MPC · JPL
270072	2001 PR_{47}	—	August 13, 2001	Haleakala	NEAT	·	1.4 km	MPC · JPL
270073	2001 PR_{49}	—	August 14, 2001	Palomar	NEAT	·	650 m	MPC · JPL
270074	2001 PV_{49}	—	August 15, 2001	Haleakala	NEAT	·	1.8 km	MPC · JPL
270075	2001 PQ_{57}	—	August 14, 2001	Haleakala	NEAT	·	1.5 km	MPC · JPL
270076	2001 PU_{57}	—	August 14, 2001	Haleakala	NEAT	·	1.0 km	MPC · JPL
270077	2001 QS	—	August 16, 2001	Socorro	LINEAR	V	820 m	MPC · JPL
270078	2001 QG_{1}	—	August 16, 2001	Socorro	LINEAR	NYS	1.8 km	MPC · JPL
270079	2001 QX_{20}	—	August 16, 2001	Socorro	LINEAR	(895)	6.4 km	MPC · JPL
270080	2001 QL_{24}	—	August 16, 2001	Socorro	LINEAR	·	2.1 km	MPC · JPL
270081	2001 QY_{39}	—	August 16, 2001	Socorro	LINEAR	·	3.3 km	MPC · JPL
270082	2001 QG_{56}	—	August 16, 2001	Socorro	LINEAR	NYS	1.4 km	MPC · JPL
270083	2001 QJ_{61}	—	August 16, 2001	Socorro	LINEAR	·	4.4 km	MPC · JPL
270084	2001 QY_{90}	—	August 22, 2001	Socorro	LINEAR	PHO	1.6 km	MPC · JPL
270085	2001 QQ_{98}	—	August 20, 2001	Socorro	LINEAR	·	1.8 km	MPC · JPL
270086	2001 QN_{113}	—	August 25, 2001	Socorro	LINEAR	·	2.0 km	MPC · JPL
270087	2001 QM_{124}	—	August 19, 2001	Socorro	LINEAR	NYS	1.2 km	MPC · JPL
270088	2001 QQ_{132}	—	August 20, 2001	Socorro	LINEAR	·	890 m	MPC · JPL
270089	2001 QQ_{135}	—	August 22, 2001	Socorro	LINEAR	PHO	1.2 km	MPC · JPL
270090	2001 QE_{156}	—	August 23, 2001	Anderson Mesa	LONEOS	·	1.1 km	MPC · JPL
270091	2001 QG_{195}	—	August 22, 2001	Haleakala	NEAT	MAS	840 m	MPC · JPL
270092	2001 QC_{214}	—	August 23, 2001	Anderson Mesa	LONEOS	H	690 m	MPC · JPL
270093	2001 QA_{216}	—	August 23, 2001	Anderson Mesa	LONEOS	V	1.1 km	MPC · JPL
270094	2001 QO_{224}	—	August 24, 2001	Socorro	LINEAR	NYS	1.6 km	MPC · JPL
270095	2001 QH_{228}	—	August 24, 2001	Anderson Mesa	LONEOS	·	4.8 km	MPC · JPL
270096	2001 QP_{231}	—	August 24, 2001	Anderson Mesa	LONEOS	·	1.7 km	MPC · JPL
270097	2001 QP_{233}	—	August 24, 2001	Socorro	LINEAR	·	1.8 km	MPC · JPL
270098	2001 QD_{255}	—	August 25, 2001	Socorro	LINEAR	TIR	3.4 km	MPC · JPL
270099	2001 QZ_{255}	—	August 25, 2001	Socorro	LINEAR	V	1.0 km	MPC · JPL
270100	2001 QH_{259}	—	August 25, 2001	Socorro	LINEAR	·	5.6 km	MPC · JPL

== 270101–270200 ==
back to top

Designation			Discovery			Properties		Ref
Permanent	Provisional	Named after	Date	Site	Discoverer(s)	Category	Diam.	Ref
270101	2001 QC_{267}	—	August 20, 2001	Socorro	LINEAR	·	1.4 km	MPC · JPL
270102	2001 QR_{273}	—	August 19, 2001	Socorro	LINEAR	·	1.7 km	MPC · JPL
270103	2001 QU_{284}	—	August 31, 2001	Palomar	NEAT	·	1.9 km	MPC · JPL
270104	2001 QP_{294}	—	August 24, 2001	Anderson Mesa	LONEOS	·	1.3 km	MPC · JPL
270105	2001 QQ_{329}	—	August 23, 2001	Anderson Mesa	LONEOS	·	1.6 km	MPC · JPL
270106	2001 QQ_{334}	—	August 27, 2001	Palomar	NEAT	·	4.1 km	MPC · JPL
270107	2001 RM_{1}	—	September 7, 2001	Socorro	LINEAR	MAS	830 m	MPC · JPL
270108	2001 RG_{4}	—	September 8, 2001	Socorro	LINEAR	·	2.0 km	MPC · JPL
270109	2001 RA_{8}	—	September 8, 2001	Socorro	LINEAR	·	1.9 km	MPC · JPL
270110	2001 RQ_{19}	—	September 7, 2001	Socorro	LINEAR	·	1.5 km	MPC · JPL
270111	2001 RL_{20}	—	September 7, 2001	Socorro	LINEAR	·	1.5 km	MPC · JPL
270112	2001 RS_{22}	—	September 7, 2001	Socorro	LINEAR	NYS	1.4 km	MPC · JPL
270113	2001 RU_{28}	—	September 7, 2001	Socorro	LINEAR	·	4.9 km	MPC · JPL
270114	2001 RH_{29}	—	September 7, 2001	Socorro	LINEAR	NYS	1.3 km	MPC · JPL
270115	2001 RR_{43}	—	September 10, 2001	Desert Eagle	W. K. Y. Yeung	V	1.0 km	MPC · JPL
270116	2001 RO_{47}	—	September 12, 2001	Socorro	LINEAR	H	700 m	MPC · JPL
270117	2001 RC_{62}	—	September 12, 2001	Socorro	LINEAR	·	1.5 km	MPC · JPL
270118	2001 RD_{73}	—	September 10, 2001	Socorro	LINEAR	·	2.2 km	MPC · JPL
270119	2001 RN_{74}	—	September 10, 2001	Socorro	LINEAR	·	1.5 km	MPC · JPL
270120	2001 RJ_{84}	—	September 11, 2001	Anderson Mesa	LONEOS	·	4.5 km	MPC · JPL
270121	2001 RW_{95}	—	September 11, 2001	Kitt Peak	Spacewatch	·	1.4 km	MPC · JPL
270122	2001 RN_{100}	—	September 12, 2001	Socorro	LINEAR	V	1.0 km	MPC · JPL
270123	2001 RC_{102}	—	September 12, 2001	Socorro	LINEAR	·	1.4 km	MPC · JPL
270124	2001 RD_{103}	—	September 12, 2001	Socorro	LINEAR	·	1.3 km	MPC · JPL
270125	2001 RM_{105}	—	September 12, 2001	Socorro	LINEAR	THM	2.7 km	MPC · JPL
270126	2001 RQ_{110}	—	September 12, 2001	Socorro	LINEAR	MAS	820 m	MPC · JPL
270127	2001 RR_{115}	—	September 12, 2001	Socorro	LINEAR	·	1.4 km	MPC · JPL
270128	2001 RS_{115}	—	September 12, 2001	Socorro	LINEAR	·	770 m	MPC · JPL
270129	2001 RT_{115}	—	September 12, 2001	Socorro	LINEAR	·	1.9 km	MPC · JPL
270130	2001 RW_{116}	—	September 12, 2001	Socorro	LINEAR	·	1.2 km	MPC · JPL
270131	2001 RJ_{120}	—	September 12, 2001	Socorro	LINEAR	·	4.9 km	MPC · JPL
270132	2001 RF_{124}	—	September 12, 2001	Socorro	LINEAR	NYS	1.2 km	MPC · JPL
270133	2001 RQ_{127}	—	September 12, 2001	Socorro	LINEAR	MAS	960 m	MPC · JPL
270134	2001 RS_{127}	—	September 12, 2001	Socorro	LINEAR	·	1.4 km	MPC · JPL
270135	2001 RB_{128}	—	September 12, 2001	Socorro	LINEAR	·	1.6 km	MPC · JPL
270136	2001 RR_{129}	—	September 12, 2001	Socorro	LINEAR	(5)	1.3 km	MPC · JPL
270137	2001 RH_{133}	—	September 12, 2001	Socorro	LINEAR	·	1.6 km	MPC · JPL
270138	2001 RE_{139}	—	September 12, 2001	Socorro	LINEAR	·	1.2 km	MPC · JPL
270139	2001 SP_{1}	—	September 17, 2001	Desert Eagle	W. K. Y. Yeung	CLA	2.7 km	MPC · JPL
270140	2001 SV_{5}	—	September 17, 2001	Socorro	LINEAR	H	740 m	MPC · JPL
270141	2001 SN_{9}	—	September 18, 2001	Desert Eagle	W. K. Y. Yeung	·	1.1 km	MPC · JPL
270142	2001 SQ_{19}	—	September 16, 2001	Socorro	LINEAR	VER	3.9 km	MPC · JPL
270143	2001 SQ_{21}	—	September 16, 2001	Socorro	LINEAR	·	1.0 km	MPC · JPL
270144	2001 SM_{23}	—	September 16, 2001	Socorro	LINEAR	·	1.6 km	MPC · JPL
270145	2001 SN_{23}	—	September 16, 2001	Socorro	LINEAR	MAS	880 m	MPC · JPL
270146	2001 SX_{36}	—	September 16, 2001	Socorro	LINEAR	·	1.4 km	MPC · JPL
270147	2001 SL_{62}	—	September 17, 2001	Socorro	LINEAR	·	1.5 km	MPC · JPL
270148	2001 SO_{65}	—	September 17, 2001	Socorro	LINEAR	PHO	3.2 km	MPC · JPL
270149	2001 SF_{73}	—	September 19, 2001	Socorro	LINEAR	H	600 m	MPC · JPL
270150	2001 SG_{73}	—	September 20, 2001	Socorro	LINEAR	·	1.3 km	MPC · JPL
270151	2001 ST_{89}	—	September 20, 2001	Socorro	LINEAR	·	1.1 km	MPC · JPL
270152	2001 SZ_{90}	—	September 20, 2001	Socorro	LINEAR	·	1.2 km	MPC · JPL
270153	2001 ST_{94}	—	September 20, 2001	Socorro	LINEAR	·	1.5 km	MPC · JPL
270154	2001 SH_{95}	—	September 20, 2001	Socorro	LINEAR	CLA	1.7 km	MPC · JPL
270155	2001 SN_{106}	—	September 20, 2001	Socorro	LINEAR	·	2.1 km	MPC · JPL
270156	2001 SN_{112}	—	September 19, 2001	Socorro	LINEAR	H	640 m	MPC · JPL
270157	2001 SR_{131}	—	September 16, 2001	Socorro	LINEAR	·	1.2 km	MPC · JPL
270158	2001 SP_{137}	—	September 16, 2001	Socorro	LINEAR	MAS	870 m	MPC · JPL
270159	2001 SH_{140}	—	September 16, 2001	Socorro	LINEAR	NYS	1.5 km	MPC · JPL
270160	2001 SH_{143}	—	September 16, 2001	Socorro	LINEAR	·	3.6 km	MPC · JPL
270161	2001 SU_{157}	—	September 17, 2001	Socorro	LINEAR	SYL · CYB	5.4 km	MPC · JPL
270162	2001 ST_{161}	—	September 17, 2001	Socorro	LINEAR	·	1.6 km	MPC · JPL
270163	2001 SE_{171}	—	September 16, 2001	Socorro	LINEAR	·	1.2 km	MPC · JPL
270164	2001 SN_{171}	—	September 16, 2001	Socorro	LINEAR	·	1.5 km	MPC · JPL
270165	2001 SG_{176}	—	September 16, 2001	Socorro	LINEAR	·	1.9 km	MPC · JPL
270166	2001 SR_{177}	—	September 16, 2001	Socorro	LINEAR	·	2.0 km	MPC · JPL
270167	2001 SU_{185}	—	September 19, 2001	Socorro	LINEAR	·	1.2 km	MPC · JPL
270168	2001 SN_{195}	—	September 19, 2001	Socorro	LINEAR	THM	2.6 km	MPC · JPL
270169	2001 SS_{199}	—	September 19, 2001	Socorro	LINEAR	MAS	920 m	MPC · JPL
270170	2001 SH_{218}	—	September 19, 2001	Socorro	LINEAR	NYS	1.2 km	MPC · JPL
270171	2001 SQ_{221}	—	September 19, 2001	Socorro	LINEAR	NYS	1.3 km	MPC · JPL
270172	2001 SK_{225}	—	September 19, 2001	Socorro	LINEAR	·	1.4 km	MPC · JPL
270173	2001 SA_{226}	—	September 19, 2001	Socorro	LINEAR	NYS	1.4 km	MPC · JPL
270174	2001 ST_{240}	—	September 19, 2001	Socorro	LINEAR	NYS	1.2 km	MPC · JPL
270175	2001 SX_{242}	—	September 19, 2001	Socorro	LINEAR	·	1.7 km	MPC · JPL
270176	2001 SZ_{251}	—	September 19, 2001	Socorro	LINEAR	·	1.8 km	MPC · JPL
270177	2001 SQ_{255}	—	September 19, 2001	Socorro	LINEAR	·	1.6 km	MPC · JPL
270178	2001 SQ_{259}	—	September 20, 2001	Socorro	LINEAR	·	1.4 km	MPC · JPL
270179	2001 SH_{263}	—	September 25, 2001	Eskridge	G. Hug	H	710 m	MPC · JPL
270180	2001 SP_{264}	—	September 17, 2001	Socorro	LINEAR	H	740 m	MPC · JPL
270181	2001 SH_{273}	—	September 18, 2001	Kitt Peak	Spacewatch	MAS	810 m	MPC · JPL
270182	2001 SY_{273}	—	September 20, 2001	Kitt Peak	Spacewatch	·	1.1 km	MPC · JPL
270183	2001 SC_{275}	—	September 21, 2001	Kitt Peak	Spacewatch	·	2.1 km	MPC · JPL
270184	2001 SZ_{275}	—	September 26, 2001	Socorro	LINEAR	H	810 m	MPC · JPL
270185	2001 SP_{277}	—	September 21, 2001	Anderson Mesa	LONEOS	·	1.3 km	MPC · JPL
270186	2001 SO_{288}	—	September 28, 2001	Palomar	NEAT	·	1.9 km	MPC · JPL
270187	2001 SY_{301}	—	September 20, 2001	Socorro	LINEAR	NYS	1.2 km	MPC · JPL
270188	2001 SD_{307}	—	September 21, 2001	Socorro	LINEAR	·	1.4 km	MPC · JPL
270189	2001 SM_{313}	—	September 21, 2001	Socorro	LINEAR	·	1.9 km	MPC · JPL
270190	2001 SM_{320}	—	September 21, 2001	Socorro	LINEAR	·	1.3 km	MPC · JPL
270191	2001 SC_{334}	—	September 19, 2001	Kitt Peak	Spacewatch	·	1.3 km	MPC · JPL
270192	2001 SX_{341}	—	September 21, 2001	Palomar	NEAT	V	870 m	MPC · JPL
270193	2001 SK_{347}	—	September 25, 2001	Socorro	LINEAR	PHO	1.0 km	MPC · JPL
270194	2001 SE_{350}	—	September 20, 2001	Socorro	LINEAR	·	910 m	MPC · JPL
270195	2001 SO_{353}	—	September 22, 2001	Anderson Mesa	LONEOS	EUN	1.3 km	MPC · JPL
270196	2001 SK_{355}	—	September 18, 2001	Apache Point	SDSS	·	6.4 km	MPC · JPL
270197	2001 TN_{2}	—	October 6, 2001	Palomar	NEAT	V	840 m	MPC · JPL
270198	2001 TE_{13}	—	October 13, 2001	Socorro	LINEAR	H	590 m	MPC · JPL
270199	2001 TH_{13}	—	October 14, 2001	Socorro	LINEAR	H	880 m	MPC · JPL
270200	2001 TZ_{29}	—	October 14, 2001	Socorro	LINEAR	NYS	1.3 km	MPC · JPL

== 270201–270300 ==
back to top

Designation			Discovery			Properties		Ref
Permanent	Provisional	Named after	Date	Site	Discoverer(s)	Category	Diam.	Ref
270201	2001 TS_{32}	—	October 14, 2001	Socorro	LINEAR	·	2.3 km	MPC · JPL
270202	2001 TK_{42}	—	October 14, 2001	Socorro	LINEAR	·	3.3 km	MPC · JPL
270203	2001 TA_{54}	—	October 13, 2001	Socorro	LINEAR	V	1.0 km	MPC · JPL
270204	2001 TJ_{68}	—	October 13, 2001	Socorro	LINEAR	NYS	1.9 km	MPC · JPL
270205	2001 TF_{86}	—	October 14, 2001	Socorro	LINEAR	·	2.1 km	MPC · JPL
270206	2001 TT_{90}	—	October 14, 2001	Socorro	LINEAR	·	1.9 km	MPC · JPL
270207	2001 TB_{92}	—	October 14, 2001	Socorro	LINEAR	·	1.4 km	MPC · JPL
270208	2001 TM_{92}	—	October 14, 2001	Socorro	LINEAR	(5)	1.4 km	MPC · JPL
270209	2001 TB_{97}	—	October 14, 2001	Socorro	LINEAR	·	1.7 km	MPC · JPL
270210	2001 TC_{97}	—	October 14, 2001	Socorro	LINEAR	(5)	1.3 km	MPC · JPL
270211	2001 TJ_{99}	—	October 14, 2001	Socorro	LINEAR	CYB	5.5 km	MPC · JPL
270212	2001 TO_{120}	—	October 15, 2001	Socorro	LINEAR	·	1.9 km	MPC · JPL
270213	2001 TN_{139}	—	October 10, 2001	Palomar	NEAT	·	1.5 km	MPC · JPL
270214	2001 TO_{139}	—	October 10, 2001	Palomar	NEAT	V	990 m	MPC · JPL
270215	2001 TY_{142}	—	October 10, 2001	Palomar	NEAT	·	4.9 km	MPC · JPL
270216	2001 TA_{146}	—	October 10, 2001	Palomar	NEAT	·	2.0 km	MPC · JPL
270217	2001 TB_{149}	—	October 10, 2001	Palomar	NEAT	(5)	1.7 km	MPC · JPL
270218	2001 TD_{151}	—	October 10, 2001	Palomar	NEAT	·	1.5 km	MPC · JPL
270219	2001 TK_{154}	—	October 15, 2001	Palomar	NEAT	V	1.2 km	MPC · JPL
270220	2001 TZ_{168}	—	October 15, 2001	Socorro	LINEAR	·	1.4 km	MPC · JPL
270221	2001 TN_{169}	—	October 15, 2001	Socorro	LINEAR	PHO	1.5 km	MPC · JPL
270222	2001 TF_{173}	—	October 13, 2001	Socorro	LINEAR	(5)	1.3 km	MPC · JPL
270223	2001 TM_{173}	—	October 14, 2001	Socorro	LINEAR	MAS	770 m	MPC · JPL
270224	2001 TE_{180}	—	October 14, 2001	Socorro	LINEAR	·	2.5 km	MPC · JPL
270225	2001 TN_{183}	—	October 14, 2001	Socorro	LINEAR	SUL	1.9 km	MPC · JPL
270226	2001 TD_{189}	—	October 14, 2001	Socorro	LINEAR	·	1.6 km	MPC · JPL
270227	2001 TD_{191}	—	October 14, 2001	Socorro	LINEAR	·	3.6 km	MPC · JPL
270228	2001 TF_{196}	—	October 13, 2001	Palomar	NEAT	·	2.0 km	MPC · JPL
270229	2001 TX_{198}	—	October 11, 2001	Socorro	LINEAR	·	1.8 km	MPC · JPL
270230	2001 TG_{203}	—	October 11, 2001	Socorro	LINEAR	·	1.5 km	MPC · JPL
270231	2001 TT_{206}	—	October 11, 2001	Palomar	NEAT	·	2.1 km	MPC · JPL
270232	2001 TV_{210}	—	October 13, 2001	Anderson Mesa	LONEOS	V	930 m	MPC · JPL
270233	2001 TP_{213}	—	October 13, 2001	Palomar	NEAT	GEF	1.9 km	MPC · JPL
270234	2001 TU_{214}	—	October 13, 2001	Palomar	NEAT	·	1.8 km	MPC · JPL
270235	2001 TC_{229}	—	October 15, 2001	Kitt Peak	Spacewatch	fast	1.5 km	MPC · JPL
270236	2001 TB_{240}	—	October 10, 2001	Palomar	NEAT	SUL	2.8 km	MPC · JPL
270237	2001 TM_{245}	—	October 14, 2001	Apache Point	SDSS	NYS	950 m	MPC · JPL
270238	2001 TD_{252}	—	October 14, 2001	Apache Point	SDSS	·	1.5 km	MPC · JPL
270239	2001 TD_{260}	—	October 14, 2001	Apache Point	SDSS	·	1.3 km	MPC · JPL
270240	2001 UH_{10}	—	October 21, 2001	Palomar	NEAT	·	1.2 km	MPC · JPL
270241	2001 UL_{11}	—	October 23, 2001	Socorro	LINEAR	H	640 m	MPC · JPL
270242	2001 US_{13}	—	October 24, 2001	Desert Eagle	W. K. Y. Yeung	·	1.4 km	MPC · JPL
270243	2001 UA_{18}	—	October 24, 2001	Powell	Powell	·	2.4 km	MPC · JPL
270244	2001 UL_{18}	—	October 16, 2001	Kitt Peak	Spacewatch	·	1.4 km	MPC · JPL
270245	2001 UR_{21}	—	October 17, 2001	Socorro	LINEAR	H	770 m	MPC · JPL
270246	2001 UE_{22}	—	October 17, 2001	Socorro	LINEAR	·	1.7 km	MPC · JPL
270247	2001 UG_{25}	—	October 18, 2001	Socorro	LINEAR	·	3.6 km	MPC · JPL
270248	2001 UJ_{25}	—	October 18, 2001	Socorro	LINEAR	·	1.8 km	MPC · JPL
270249	2001 UC_{29}	—	October 16, 2001	Socorro	LINEAR	(5)	1.4 km	MPC · JPL
270250	2001 UR_{30}	—	October 16, 2001	Socorro	LINEAR	·	2.1 km	MPC · JPL
270251	2001 UV_{30}	—	October 16, 2001	Socorro	LINEAR	·	1.6 km	MPC · JPL
270252	2001 US_{34}	—	October 16, 2001	Socorro	LINEAR	·	2.3 km	MPC · JPL
270253	2001 UE_{36}	—	October 16, 2001	Socorro	LINEAR	·	3.5 km	MPC · JPL
270254	2001 UU_{39}	—	October 17, 2001	Socorro	LINEAR	·	1.4 km	MPC · JPL
270255	2001 UC_{51}	—	October 17, 2001	Socorro	LINEAR	·	2.1 km	MPC · JPL
270256	2001 UW_{97}	—	October 17, 2001	Socorro	LINEAR	NYS	1.3 km	MPC · JPL
270257	2001 UD_{100}	—	October 17, 2001	Socorro	LINEAR	·	1.6 km	MPC · JPL
270258	2001 UZ_{101}	—	October 20, 2001	Socorro	LINEAR	·	1.5 km	MPC · JPL
270259	2001 UQ_{106}	—	October 20, 2001	Socorro	LINEAR	V	1.1 km	MPC · JPL
270260	2001 UD_{116}	—	October 22, 2001	Socorro	LINEAR	·	1.7 km	MPC · JPL
270261	2001 UO_{117}	—	October 22, 2001	Socorro	LINEAR	·	1.6 km	MPC · JPL
270262	2001 UY_{137}	—	October 23, 2001	Socorro	LINEAR	·	1.5 km	MPC · JPL
270263	2001 UF_{139}	—	October 23, 2001	Socorro	LINEAR	CYB	5.5 km	MPC · JPL
270264	2001 UH_{144}	—	October 23, 2001	Socorro	LINEAR	NYS	1.7 km	MPC · JPL
270265	2001 UB_{147}	—	October 23, 2001	Socorro	LINEAR	·	1.1 km	MPC · JPL
270266	2001 UB_{166}	—	October 18, 2001	Kitt Peak	Spacewatch	NYS	1.4 km	MPC · JPL
270267	2001 UP_{166}	—	October 24, 2001	Kitt Peak	Spacewatch	·	1.2 km	MPC · JPL
270268	2001 UH_{171}	—	October 21, 2001	Socorro	LINEAR	·	1.1 km	MPC · JPL
270269	2001 UX_{171}	—	October 18, 2001	Palomar	NEAT	·	2.3 km	MPC · JPL
270270	2001 UT_{172}	—	October 18, 2001	Palomar	NEAT	·	1.5 km	MPC · JPL
270271	2001 UM_{175}	—	October 24, 2001	Palomar	NEAT	·	1.9 km	MPC · JPL
270272	2001 UK_{182}	—	October 16, 2001	Palomar	NEAT	·	1.5 km	MPC · JPL
270273	2001 UG_{187}	—	October 17, 2001	Palomar	NEAT	V	810 m	MPC · JPL
270274	2001 UJ_{194}	—	October 18, 2001	Palomar	NEAT	·	2.3 km	MPC · JPL
270275	2001 UB_{211}	—	October 21, 2001	Socorro	LINEAR	NYS	1.6 km	MPC · JPL
270276	2001 US_{215}	—	October 23, 2001	Socorro	LINEAR	MAR	1.2 km	MPC · JPL
270277	2001 UC_{227}	—	October 16, 2001	Palomar	NEAT	·	1.4 km	MPC · JPL
270278	2001 VP_{5}	—	November 9, 2001	Socorro	LINEAR	·	1.7 km	MPC · JPL
270279	2001 VT_{7}	—	November 9, 2001	Socorro	LINEAR	(5)	1.4 km	MPC · JPL
270280	2001 VH_{11}	—	November 10, 2001	Socorro	LINEAR	·	1.6 km	MPC · JPL
270281	2001 VX_{19}	—	November 9, 2001	Socorro	LINEAR	V	1.0 km	MPC · JPL
270282	2001 VV_{47}	—	November 9, 2001	Socorro	LINEAR	·	2.5 km	MPC · JPL
270283	2001 VX_{63}	—	November 10, 2001	Socorro	LINEAR	·	1.6 km	MPC · JPL
270284	2001 VV_{69}	—	November 11, 2001	Socorro	LINEAR	·	1.7 km	MPC · JPL
270285	2001 VD_{70}	—	November 11, 2001	Socorro	LINEAR	GAL	2.4 km	MPC · JPL
270286	2001 VY_{76}	—	November 15, 2001	Socorro	LINEAR	H	950 m	MPC · JPL
270287	2001 VK_{79}	—	November 9, 2001	Palomar	NEAT	·	1.7 km	MPC · JPL
270288	2001 VV_{82}	—	November 10, 2001	Socorro	LINEAR	·	1.8 km	MPC · JPL
270289	2001 VG_{88}	—	November 12, 2001	Haleakala	NEAT	·	1.8 km	MPC · JPL
270290	2001 VP_{103}	—	November 12, 2001	Socorro	LINEAR	·	1.4 km	MPC · JPL
270291	2001 VH_{106}	—	November 12, 2001	Socorro	LINEAR	·	1.8 km	MPC · JPL
270292	2001 VM_{110}	—	November 12, 2001	Socorro	LINEAR	·	2.3 km	MPC · JPL
270293	2001 VE_{112}	—	November 12, 2001	Socorro	LINEAR	(5)	1.6 km	MPC · JPL
270294	2001 VH_{115}	—	November 12, 2001	Socorro	LINEAR	·	3.0 km	MPC · JPL
270295	2001 VK_{115}	—	November 12, 2001	Socorro	LINEAR	T_{j} (2.99) · 3:2	6.3 km	MPC · JPL
270296	2001 VH_{117}	—	November 12, 2001	Socorro	LINEAR	·	1.9 km	MPC · JPL
270297	2001 VE_{120}	—	November 12, 2001	Socorro	LINEAR	·	1.4 km	MPC · JPL
270298	2001 VQ_{127}	—	November 11, 2001	Apache Point	SDSS	·	1.4 km	MPC · JPL
270299	2001 VS_{127}	—	November 11, 2001	Apache Point	SDSS	·	1.6 km	MPC · JPL
270300	2001 VU_{129}	—	November 11, 2001	Apache Point	SDSS	EUN	870 m	MPC · JPL

== 270301–270400 ==
back to top

Designation			Discovery			Properties		Ref
Permanent	Provisional	Named after	Date	Site	Discoverer(s)	Category	Diam.	Ref
270301	2001 VX_{132}	—	November 8, 2001	Socorro	LINEAR	·	3.0 km	MPC · JPL
270302	2001 WA_{2}	—	November 18, 2001	Socorro	LINEAR	H	740 m	MPC · JPL
270303	2001 WB_{2}	—	November 18, 2001	Socorro	LINEAR	·	3.0 km	MPC · JPL
270304	2001 WW_{2}	—	November 16, 2001	Kitt Peak	Spacewatch	·	1.7 km	MPC · JPL
270305	2001 WQ_{10}	—	November 17, 2001	Socorro	LINEAR	·	950 m	MPC · JPL
270306	2001 WS_{42}	—	November 18, 2001	Socorro	LINEAR	·	1.2 km	MPC · JPL
270307	2001 WQ_{44}	—	November 18, 2001	Socorro	LINEAR	NYS	1.7 km	MPC · JPL
270308	2001 WS_{53}	—	November 19, 2001	Socorro	LINEAR	·	2.0 km	MPC · JPL
270309	2001 WL_{70}	—	November 20, 2001	Socorro	LINEAR	·	1.6 km	MPC · JPL
270310	2001 WD_{78}	—	November 20, 2001	Socorro	LINEAR	·	1.4 km	MPC · JPL
270311	2001 WE_{82}	—	November 20, 2001	Socorro	LINEAR	NYS	1.5 km	MPC · JPL
270312	2001 WP_{84}	—	November 20, 2001	Socorro	LINEAR	·	1.2 km	MPC · JPL
270313	2001 XJ	—	December 3, 2001	Socorro	LINEAR	·	2.3 km	MPC · JPL
270314	2001 XY_{8}	—	December 9, 2001	Socorro	LINEAR	(5)	1.3 km	MPC · JPL
270315	2001 XV_{12}	—	December 9, 2001	Socorro	LINEAR	·	3.8 km	MPC · JPL
270316	2001 XG_{15}	—	December 10, 2001	Socorro	LINEAR	·	2.5 km	MPC · JPL
270317	2001 XO_{19}	—	December 9, 2001	Socorro	LINEAR	·	2.1 km	MPC · JPL
270318	2001 XD_{29}	—	December 11, 2001	Socorro	LINEAR	·	2.2 km	MPC · JPL
270319	2001 XJ_{32}	—	December 7, 2001	Kitt Peak	Spacewatch	·	1.2 km	MPC · JPL
270320	2001 XS_{38}	—	December 9, 2001	Socorro	LINEAR	·	2.3 km	MPC · JPL
270321	2001 XT_{39}	—	December 9, 2001	Socorro	LINEAR	·	2.1 km	MPC · JPL
270322	2001 XB_{60}	—	December 10, 2001	Socorro	LINEAR	·	2.1 km	MPC · JPL
270323	2001 XU_{90}	—	December 10, 2001	Socorro	LINEAR	·	1.1 km	MPC · JPL
270324	2001 XV_{96}	—	December 10, 2001	Socorro	LINEAR	·	1.8 km	MPC · JPL
270325	2001 XC_{104}	—	December 14, 2001	Socorro	LINEAR	slow	1.5 km	MPC · JPL
270326	2001 XU_{109}	—	December 11, 2001	Socorro	LINEAR	VER	4.7 km	MPC · JPL
270327	2001 XK_{113}	—	December 11, 2001	Socorro	LINEAR	(5)	1.5 km	MPC · JPL
270328	2001 XG_{116}	—	December 13, 2001	Socorro	LINEAR	(5)	1.9 km	MPC · JPL
270329	2001 XU_{116}	—	December 13, 2001	Socorro	LINEAR	MAR	1.6 km	MPC · JPL
270330	2001 XS_{121}	—	December 14, 2001	Socorro	LINEAR	·	2.2 km	MPC · JPL
270331	2001 XX_{134}	—	December 14, 2001	Socorro	LINEAR	·	1.8 km	MPC · JPL
270332	2001 XD_{155}	—	December 14, 2001	Socorro	LINEAR	·	1.7 km	MPC · JPL
270333	2001 XT_{169}	—	December 14, 2001	Socorro	LINEAR	·	2.5 km	MPC · JPL
270334	2001 XU_{172}	—	December 14, 2001	Socorro	LINEAR	·	1.6 km	MPC · JPL
270335	2001 XW_{180}	—	December 14, 2001	Socorro	LINEAR	·	2.5 km	MPC · JPL
270336	2001 XH_{183}	—	December 14, 2001	Socorro	LINEAR	·	2.8 km	MPC · JPL
270337	2001 XU_{185}	—	December 14, 2001	Socorro	LINEAR	(5)	1.5 km	MPC · JPL
270338	2001 XZ_{194}	—	December 14, 2001	Socorro	LINEAR	·	1.8 km	MPC · JPL
270339	2001 XN_{195}	—	December 14, 2001	Socorro	LINEAR	·	2.1 km	MPC · JPL
270340	2001 XM_{211}	—	December 11, 2001	Socorro	LINEAR	(5)	1.6 km	MPC · JPL
270341	2001 XG_{219}	—	December 15, 2001	Socorro	LINEAR	·	1.7 km	MPC · JPL
270342	2001 XP_{219}	—	December 15, 2001	Socorro	LINEAR	MAR	1.2 km	MPC · JPL
270343	2001 XG_{220}	—	December 15, 2001	Socorro	LINEAR	GEF	1.6 km	MPC · JPL
270344	2001 XP_{223}	—	December 15, 2001	Socorro	LINEAR	(5)	1.2 km	MPC · JPL
270345	2001 XU_{223}	—	December 15, 2001	Socorro	LINEAR	·	2.6 km	MPC · JPL
270346	2001 XC_{249}	—	December 14, 2001	Kitt Peak	Spacewatch	·	1.4 km	MPC · JPL
270347	2001 XX_{252}	—	December 14, 2001	Socorro	LINEAR	·	1.7 km	MPC · JPL
270348	2001 XZ_{262}	—	December 13, 2001	Palomar	NEAT	·	3.6 km	MPC · JPL
270349	2001 XE_{267}	—	December 15, 2001	Apache Point	SDSS	·	2.3 km	MPC · JPL
270350	2001 YX_{4}	—	December 23, 2001	Kingsnake	J. V. McClusky	HNS	1.6 km	MPC · JPL
270351	2001 YM_{20}	—	December 18, 2001	Socorro	LINEAR	·	1.6 km	MPC · JPL
270352	2001 YR_{23}	—	December 18, 2001	Socorro	LINEAR	RAF	1.1 km	MPC · JPL
270353	2001 YB_{40}	—	December 18, 2001	Socorro	LINEAR	·	2.0 km	MPC · JPL
270354	2001 YX_{40}	—	December 18, 2001	Socorro	LINEAR	(5)	1.3 km	MPC · JPL
270355	2001 YD_{45}	—	December 18, 2001	Socorro	LINEAR	·	1.4 km	MPC · JPL
270356	2001 YU_{49}	—	December 18, 2001	Socorro	LINEAR	T_{j} (2.99) · HIL · 3:2	7.3 km	MPC · JPL
270357	2001 YA_{51}	—	December 18, 2001	Socorro	LINEAR	·	1.5 km	MPC · JPL
270358	2001 YN_{54}	—	December 18, 2001	Socorro	LINEAR	T_{j} (2.98) · 3:2	4.6 km	MPC · JPL
270359	2001 YU_{62}	—	December 18, 2001	Socorro	LINEAR	(5)	1.7 km	MPC · JPL
270360	2001 YS_{73}	—	December 18, 2001	Socorro	LINEAR	(5)	1.6 km	MPC · JPL
270361	2001 YK_{86}	—	December 18, 2001	Socorro	LINEAR	·	1.7 km	MPC · JPL
270362	2001 YL_{91}	—	December 17, 2001	Palomar	NEAT	JUN	1.6 km	MPC · JPL
270363	2001 YQ_{98}	—	December 17, 2001	Socorro	LINEAR	(5)	1.2 km	MPC · JPL
270364	2001 YY_{105}	—	December 17, 2001	Socorro	LINEAR	·	2.1 km	MPC · JPL
270365	2001 YU_{117}	—	December 18, 2001	Socorro	LINEAR	·	1.8 km	MPC · JPL
270366	2001 YN_{126}	—	December 17, 2001	Socorro	LINEAR	·	2.6 km	MPC · JPL
270367	2001 YQ_{127}	—	December 17, 2001	Socorro	LINEAR	·	2.4 km	MPC · JPL
270368	2001 YC_{130}	—	December 17, 2001	Socorro	LINEAR	·	1.3 km	MPC · JPL
270369	2001 YY_{138}	—	December 22, 2001	Kitt Peak	Spacewatch	·	1.3 km	MPC · JPL
270370	2001 YF_{139}	—	December 23, 2001	Kitt Peak	Spacewatch	·	2.6 km	MPC · JPL
270371	2001 YR_{159}	—	December 18, 2001	Apache Point	SDSS	·	1.8 km	MPC · JPL
270372	2001 YJ_{160}	—	December 18, 2001	Apache Point	SDSS	MAR	1.4 km	MPC · JPL
270373 William	2002 AE_{3}	William	January 7, 2002	Ibis	Edmonds, J.	H	740 m	MPC · JPL
270374 Paolomanente	2002 AB_{12}	Paolomanente	January 10, 2002	Campo Imperatore	F. Bernardi	·	2.3 km	MPC · JPL
270375	2002 AD_{25}	—	January 8, 2002	Palomar	NEAT	(5)	1.6 km	MPC · JPL
270376	2002 AM_{42}	—	January 9, 2002	Socorro	LINEAR	·	2.3 km	MPC · JPL
270377	2002 AP_{45}	—	January 9, 2002	Socorro	LINEAR	LEO	1.8 km	MPC · JPL
270378	2002 AQ_{53}	—	December 10, 2001	Kitt Peak	Spacewatch	·	1.7 km	MPC · JPL
270379	2002 AW_{55}	—	January 9, 2002	Socorro	LINEAR	·	3.3 km	MPC · JPL
270380	2002 AH_{56}	—	January 9, 2002	Socorro	LINEAR	·	2.1 km	MPC · JPL
270381	2002 AK_{61}	—	January 11, 2002	Socorro	LINEAR	·	2.3 km	MPC · JPL
270382	2002 AA_{81}	—	January 9, 2002	Socorro	LINEAR	·	1.7 km	MPC · JPL
270383	2002 AH_{103}	—	January 8, 2002	Socorro	LINEAR	(5)	1.7 km	MPC · JPL
270384	2002 AW_{107}	—	January 9, 2002	Socorro	LINEAR	·	2.2 km	MPC · JPL
270385	2002 AY_{112}	—	January 9, 2002	Socorro	LINEAR	·	1.8 km	MPC · JPL
270386	2002 AR_{113}	—	January 9, 2002	Socorro	LINEAR	(5)	1.6 km	MPC · JPL
270387	2002 AY_{129}	—	January 15, 2002	Kingsnake	J. V. McClusky	·	6.3 km	MPC · JPL
270388	2002 AV_{138}	—	January 9, 2002	Socorro	LINEAR	(5)	1.6 km	MPC · JPL
270389	2002 AY_{139}	—	January 13, 2002	Socorro	LINEAR	·	2.1 km	MPC · JPL
270390	2002 AQ_{141}	—	January 13, 2002	Socorro	LINEAR	·	2.4 km	MPC · JPL
270391	2002 AH_{143}	—	January 13, 2002	Socorro	LINEAR	·	2.7 km	MPC · JPL
270392	2002 AT_{147}	—	January 14, 2002	Socorro	LINEAR	·	2.2 km	MPC · JPL
270393	2002 AP_{156}	—	January 13, 2002	Socorro	LINEAR	·	1.5 km	MPC · JPL
270394	2002 AC_{160}	—	January 13, 2002	Socorro	LINEAR	(5)	1.4 km	MPC · JPL
270395	2002 AB_{164}	—	January 13, 2002	Socorro	LINEAR	RAF	1.8 km	MPC · JPL
270396	2002 AF_{188}	—	January 9, 2002	Socorro	LINEAR	3:2 · SHU	6.4 km	MPC · JPL
270397	2002 AV_{188}	—	January 10, 2002	Palomar	NEAT	·	1.5 km	MPC · JPL
270398	2002 AE_{189}	—	January 10, 2002	Palomar	NEAT	JUN	1.2 km	MPC · JPL
270399	2002 AP_{189}	—	January 10, 2002	Palomar	NEAT	·	3.9 km	MPC · JPL
270400	2002 AH_{190}	—	January 11, 2002	Kitt Peak	Spacewatch	·	1.7 km	MPC · JPL

== 270401–270500 ==
back to top

Designation			Discovery			Properties		Ref
Permanent	Provisional	Named after	Date	Site	Discoverer(s)	Category	Diam.	Ref
270401	2002 AM_{190}	—	January 11, 2002	Kitt Peak	Spacewatch	(5)	1.4 km	MPC · JPL
270402	2002 AV_{193}	—	December 23, 2001	Kitt Peak	Spacewatch	·	2.0 km	MPC · JPL
270403	2002 AF_{198}	—	January 8, 2002	Palomar	NEAT	·	1.6 km	MPC · JPL
270404	2002 AZ_{201}	—	January 9, 2002	Palomar	NEAT	·	2.0 km	MPC · JPL
270405	2002 AA_{202}	—	January 9, 2002	Socorro	LINEAR	·	1.5 km	MPC · JPL
270406	2002 AC_{205}	—	January 6, 2002	Palomar	NEAT	·	2.0 km	MPC · JPL
270407	2002 BE_{5}	—	January 19, 2002	Anderson Mesa	LONEOS	·	1.7 km	MPC · JPL
270408	2002 BK_{31}	—	January 22, 2002	Socorro	LINEAR	·	2.1 km	MPC · JPL
270409	2002 CF_{2}	—	February 3, 2002	Palomar	NEAT	·	3.3 km	MPC · JPL
270410	2002 CR_{3}	—	February 3, 2002	Palomar	NEAT	·	1.6 km	MPC · JPL
270411	2002 CO_{13}	—	February 8, 2002	Desert Eagle	W. K. Y. Yeung	·	2.5 km	MPC · JPL
270412	2002 CX_{14}	—	February 9, 2002	Desert Eagle	W. K. Y. Yeung	·	2.3 km	MPC · JPL
270413	2002 CN_{16}	—	February 6, 2002	Socorro	LINEAR	·	1.9 km	MPC · JPL
270414	2002 CF_{18}	—	February 6, 2002	Socorro	LINEAR	·	1.9 km	MPC · JPL
270415	2002 CV_{19}	—	February 4, 2002	Palomar	NEAT	·	2.1 km	MPC · JPL
270416	2002 CC_{20}	—	February 4, 2002	Palomar	NEAT	·	2.7 km	MPC · JPL
270417	2002 CA_{22}	—	February 5, 2002	Palomar	NEAT	ADE	3.2 km	MPC · JPL
270418	2002 CM_{22}	—	February 5, 2002	Palomar	NEAT	·	2.7 km	MPC · JPL
270419	2002 CB_{24}	—	February 6, 2002	Palomar	NEAT	·	4.2 km	MPC · JPL
270420	2002 CA_{36}	—	February 7, 2002	Socorro	LINEAR	·	2.8 km	MPC · JPL
270421	2002 CR_{36}	—	February 7, 2002	Socorro	LINEAR	·	1.8 km	MPC · JPL
270422	2002 CA_{40}	—	February 5, 2002	Haleakala	NEAT	·	3.6 km	MPC · JPL
270423	2002 CG_{61}	—	February 6, 2002	Socorro	LINEAR	·	1.7 km	MPC · JPL
270424	2002 CR_{62}	—	February 6, 2002	Socorro	LINEAR	·	2.6 km	MPC · JPL
270425	2002 CD_{65}	—	February 6, 2002	Socorro	LINEAR	·	2.0 km	MPC · JPL
270426	2002 CM_{71}	—	February 7, 2002	Socorro	LINEAR	·	2.0 km	MPC · JPL
270427	2002 CR_{71}	—	February 7, 2002	Socorro	LINEAR	·	3.5 km	MPC · JPL
270428	2002 CP_{73}	—	February 7, 2002	Socorro	LINEAR	·	1.8 km	MPC · JPL
270429	2002 CA_{74}	—	February 7, 2002	Socorro	LINEAR	DOR	3.3 km	MPC · JPL
270430	2002 CD_{75}	—	February 7, 2002	Socorro	LINEAR	·	3.9 km	MPC · JPL
270431	2002 CT_{76}	—	February 7, 2002	Socorro	LINEAR	MIS	2.7 km	MPC · JPL
270432	2002 CR_{87}	—	February 7, 2002	Socorro	LINEAR	·	2.0 km	MPC · JPL
270433	2002 CX_{90}	—	February 7, 2002	Socorro	LINEAR	·	1 km	MPC · JPL
270434	2002 CG_{91}	—	February 7, 2002	Socorro	LINEAR	·	2.1 km	MPC · JPL
270435	2002 CA_{92}	—	February 7, 2002	Socorro	LINEAR	·	3.5 km	MPC · JPL
270436	2002 CB_{92}	—	February 7, 2002	Socorro	LINEAR	·	1.8 km	MPC · JPL
270437	2002 CR_{100}	—	February 7, 2002	Socorro	LINEAR	MRX	1.5 km	MPC · JPL
270438	2002 CQ_{113}	—	February 8, 2002	Socorro	LINEAR	JUN	1.3 km	MPC · JPL
270439	2002 CZ_{115}	—	February 13, 2002	Socorro	LINEAR	·	3.4 km	MPC · JPL
270440	2002 CJ_{117}	—	February 7, 2002	Bohyunsan	Jeon, Y.-B., Lee, B.-C.	·	1.4 km	MPC · JPL
270441	2002 CS_{124}	—	February 7, 2002	Socorro	LINEAR	·	1.8 km	MPC · JPL
270442	2002 CD_{125}	—	February 7, 2002	Socorro	LINEAR	·	1.9 km	MPC · JPL
270443	2002 CN_{142}	—	February 9, 2002	Socorro	LINEAR	·	1.8 km	MPC · JPL
270444	2002 CG_{145}	—	February 9, 2002	Socorro	LINEAR	·	2.3 km	MPC · JPL
270445	2002 CL_{154}	—	February 11, 2002	Kitt Peak	Spacewatch	·	2.9 km	MPC · JPL
270446	2002 CD_{156}	—	February 6, 2002	Socorro	LINEAR	·	3.8 km	MPC · JPL
270447	2002 CE_{157}	—	February 7, 2002	Socorro	LINEAR	·	2.5 km	MPC · JPL
270448	2002 CO_{166}	—	February 8, 2002	Socorro	LINEAR	EUN	1.8 km	MPC · JPL
270449	2002 CT_{175}	—	February 10, 2002	Socorro	LINEAR	RAF	1.7 km	MPC · JPL
270450	2002 CO_{178}	—	February 10, 2002	Socorro	LINEAR	(5)	1.8 km	MPC · JPL
270451	2002 CN_{182}	—	February 10, 2002	Socorro	LINEAR	·	1.9 km	MPC · JPL
270452	2002 CN_{186}	—	February 10, 2002	Socorro	LINEAR	·	1.5 km	MPC · JPL
270453	2002 CK_{225}	—	February 15, 2002	Bergisch Gladbach	W. Bickel	NEM	2.7 km	MPC · JPL
270454	2002 CC_{229}	—	February 7, 2002	Kitt Peak	Spacewatch	·	2.1 km	MPC · JPL
270455	2002 CR_{229}	—	February 10, 2002	Kitt Peak	Spacewatch	·	1.4 km	MPC · JPL
270456	2002 CO_{237}	—	February 10, 2002	Socorro	LINEAR	EUN	1.9 km	MPC · JPL
270457	2002 CW_{246}	—	February 15, 2002	Kitt Peak	Spacewatch	·	2.0 km	MPC · JPL
270458	2002 CC_{252}	—	February 3, 2002	Haleakala	NEAT	EUN	4.8 km	MPC · JPL
270459	2002 CK_{256}	—	February 4, 2002	Palomar	NEAT	·	2.3 km	MPC · JPL
270460	2002 CF_{270}	—	February 7, 2002	Kitt Peak	Spacewatch	·	2.1 km	MPC · JPL
270461	2002 CR_{273}	—	February 8, 2002	Palomar	NEAT	BRA	2.3 km	MPC · JPL
270462	2002 CH_{276}	—	February 9, 2002	Kitt Peak	Spacewatch	NEM	2.6 km	MPC · JPL
270463	2002 CE_{278}	—	February 7, 2002	Palomar	NEAT	·	3.0 km	MPC · JPL
270464	2002 CJ_{280}	—	February 7, 2002	Palomar	NEAT	·	2.1 km	MPC · JPL
270465	2002 CJ_{285}	—	February 10, 2002	Socorro	LINEAR	·	1.6 km	MPC · JPL
270466	2002 CG_{287}	—	February 8, 2002	Kitt Peak	Spacewatch	EUN	1.4 km	MPC · JPL
270467	2002 CZ_{289}	—	February 10, 2002	Socorro	LINEAR	JUN	1.7 km	MPC · JPL
270468	2002 CB_{295}	—	February 10, 2002	Socorro	LINEAR	·	2.4 km	MPC · JPL
270469	2002 CV_{296}	—	February 10, 2002	Socorro	LINEAR	·	4.2 km	MPC · JPL
270470	2002 CA_{302}	—	February 12, 2002	Socorro	LINEAR	·	1.8 km	MPC · JPL
270471	2002 CU_{309}	—	February 6, 2002	Palomar	NEAT	·	1.9 km	MPC · JPL
270472 Csörgei	2002 CS_{316}	Csörgei	September 7, 2004	Kitt Peak	Spacewatch	·	2.9 km	MPC · JPL
270473	2002 DV_{4}	—	February 17, 2002	Cerro Tololo	Deep Lens Survey	·	3.1 km	MPC · JPL
270474	2002 DG_{14}	—	February 16, 2002	Palomar	NEAT	·	1.9 km	MPC · JPL
270475	2002 DD_{17}	—	February 20, 2002	Anderson Mesa	LONEOS	·	2.6 km	MPC · JPL
270476	2002 DU_{19}	—	February 16, 2002	Palomar	NEAT	·	4.2 km	MPC · JPL
270477	2002 EK_{5}	—	March 8, 2002	Ondřejov	P. Kušnirák, P. Pravec	PAD	1.9 km	MPC · JPL
270478	2002 EM_{21}	—	March 10, 2002	Haleakala	NEAT	·	1.7 km	MPC · JPL
270479	2002 EG_{42}	—	March 12, 2002	Socorro	LINEAR	·	1.6 km	MPC · JPL
270480	2002 ER_{45}	—	March 11, 2002	Palomar	NEAT	·	2.1 km	MPC · JPL
270481	2002 EJ_{52}	—	March 9, 2002	Socorro	LINEAR	·	2.1 km	MPC · JPL
270482	2002 ER_{56}	—	March 13, 2002	Socorro	LINEAR	·	2.2 km	MPC · JPL
270483	2002 EE_{63}	—	March 13, 2002	Socorro	LINEAR	EOS	2.2 km	MPC · JPL
270484	2002 EQ_{68}	—	March 13, 2002	Socorro	LINEAR	GEF	1.7 km	MPC · JPL
270485	2002 ET_{68}	—	March 13, 2002	Socorro	LINEAR	·	3.5 km	MPC · JPL
270486	2002 EH_{75}	—	March 14, 2002	Socorro	LINEAR	·	4.6 km	MPC · JPL
270487	2002 EH_{83}	—	March 13, 2002	Palomar	NEAT	·	3.1 km	MPC · JPL
270488	2002 EJ_{84}	—	March 9, 2002	Socorro	LINEAR	·	2.3 km	MPC · JPL
270489	2002 EJ_{93}	—	March 14, 2002	Socorro	LINEAR	ADE	2.7 km	MPC · JPL
270490	2002 EZ_{113}	—	February 12, 2002	Kitt Peak	Spacewatch	·	2.0 km	MPC · JPL
270491	2002 ET_{115}	—	March 10, 2002	Haleakala	NEAT	·	2.2 km	MPC · JPL
270492	2002 EQ_{131}	—	March 13, 2002	Kitt Peak	Spacewatch	·	2.0 km	MPC · JPL
270493	2002 ER_{132}	—	March 13, 2002	Kitt Peak	Spacewatch	·	2.7 km	MPC · JPL
270494	2002 ET_{132}	—	March 13, 2002	Palomar	NEAT	·	2.1 km	MPC · JPL
270495	2002 ED_{136}	—	March 12, 2002	Palomar	NEAT	·	2.2 km	MPC · JPL
270496	2002 EU_{136}	—	March 12, 2002	Palomar	NEAT	·	2.2 km	MPC · JPL
270497	2002 EK_{137}	—	March 12, 2002	Palomar	NEAT	·	1.7 km	MPC · JPL
270498	2002 ES_{142}	—	March 12, 2002	Palomar	NEAT	·	2.2 km	MPC · JPL
270499	2002 EY_{146}	—	March 14, 2002	Kitt Peak	Spacewatch	·	2.7 km	MPC · JPL
270500	2002 EY_{149}	—	March 19, 1993	La Silla	UESAC	AEO	1.2 km	MPC · JPL

== 270501–270600 ==
back to top

Designation			Discovery			Properties		Ref
Permanent	Provisional	Named after	Date	Site	Discoverer(s)	Category	Diam.	Ref
270501	2002 EV_{155}	—	March 13, 2002	Kitt Peak	Spacewatch	·	3.6 km	MPC · JPL
270502	2002 ES_{159}	—	March 5, 2002	Apache Point	SDSS	·	2.2 km	MPC · JPL
270503	2002 EA_{161}	—	March 13, 2002	Socorro	LINEAR	·	2.0 km	MPC · JPL
270504	2002 EY_{161}	—	March 11, 2002	Palomar	NEAT	L4	9.3 km	MPC · JPL
270505	2002 ED_{163}	—	March 10, 2002	Haleakala	NEAT	·	2.2 km	MPC · JPL
270506	2002 FP_{2}	—	March 19, 2002	Desert Eagle	W. K. Y. Yeung	·	1.0 km	MPC · JPL
270507	2002 FL_{9}	—	March 16, 2002	Socorro	LINEAR	JUN	1.6 km	MPC · JPL
270508	2002 FF_{25}	—	March 19, 2002	Palomar	NEAT	·	2.7 km	MPC · JPL
270509	2002 FQ_{26}	—	March 20, 2002	Socorro	LINEAR	JUN	2.7 km	MPC · JPL
270510	2002 FF_{27}	—	March 20, 2002	Socorro	LINEAR	·	4.1 km	MPC · JPL
270511	2002 FA_{29}	—	March 20, 2002	Socorro	LINEAR	·	2.7 km	MPC · JPL
270512	2002 FD_{30}	—	March 20, 2002	Palomar	NEAT	EUN	1.6 km	MPC · JPL
270513	2002 FF_{32}	—	March 20, 2002	Anderson Mesa	LONEOS	ADE	4.0 km	MPC · JPL
270514	2002 FP_{38}	—	March 30, 2002	Palomar	NEAT	·	2.6 km	MPC · JPL
270515	2002 GJ_{23}	—	April 15, 2002	Palomar	NEAT	·	2.7 km	MPC · JPL
270516	2002 GZ_{25}	—	April 14, 2002	Kitt Peak	Spacewatch	MIS	3.3 km	MPC · JPL
270517	2002 GS_{26}	—	April 11, 2002	Palomar	NEAT	·	2.4 km	MPC · JPL
270518	2002 GW_{26}	—	April 12, 2002	Haleakala	NEAT	·	2.4 km	MPC · JPL
270519	2002 GN_{30}	—	April 7, 2002	Cerro Tololo	M. W. Buie	·	2.7 km	MPC · JPL
270520	2002 GC_{41}	—	April 4, 2002	Kitt Peak	Spacewatch	·	2.1 km	MPC · JPL
270521	2002 GY_{43}	—	April 4, 2002	Palomar	NEAT	·	2.8 km	MPC · JPL
270522	2002 GY_{47}	—	April 4, 2002	Palomar	NEAT	·	2.9 km	MPC · JPL
270523	2002 GL_{49}	—	April 5, 2002	Anderson Mesa	LONEOS	·	2.6 km	MPC · JPL
270524	2002 GH_{62}	—	April 8, 2002	Palomar	NEAT	·	2.5 km	MPC · JPL
270525	2002 GJ_{67}	—	April 8, 2002	Palomar	NEAT	·	3.0 km	MPC · JPL
270526	2002 GC_{69}	—	April 8, 2002	Palomar	NEAT	NEM	2.9 km	MPC · JPL
270527	2002 GP_{69}	—	April 8, 2002	Palomar	NEAT	·	2.1 km	MPC · JPL
270528	2002 GC_{70}	—	April 8, 2002	Palomar	NEAT	·	2.4 km	MPC · JPL
270529	2002 GO_{75}	—	April 9, 2002	Socorro	LINEAR	·	2.6 km	MPC · JPL
270530	2002 GT_{79}	—	April 10, 2002	Palomar	NEAT	·	2.6 km	MPC · JPL
270531	2002 GU_{81}	—	April 10, 2002	Socorro	LINEAR	(13314)	2.7 km	MPC · JPL
270532	2002 GL_{82}	—	April 10, 2002	Socorro	LINEAR	·	3.0 km	MPC · JPL
270533	2002 GU_{86}	—	April 10, 2002	Palomar	NEAT	·	3.3 km	MPC · JPL
270534	2002 GV_{88}	—	April 10, 2002	Socorro	LINEAR	·	3.1 km	MPC · JPL
270535	2002 GJ_{92}	—	April 9, 2002	Kitt Peak	Spacewatch	·	2.7 km	MPC · JPL
270536	2002 GO_{99}	—	April 10, 2002	Socorro	LINEAR	PAD	2.0 km	MPC · JPL
270537	2002 GN_{101}	—	April 10, 2002	Socorro	LINEAR	·	2.5 km	MPC · JPL
270538	2002 GX_{113}	—	April 11, 2002	Socorro	LINEAR	·	2.4 km	MPC · JPL
270539	2002 GE_{114}	—	April 11, 2002	Socorro	LINEAR	·	3.2 km	MPC · JPL
270540	2002 GV_{118}	—	April 12, 2002	Palomar	NEAT	·	3.8 km	MPC · JPL
270541	2002 GY_{122}	—	April 10, 2002	Socorro	LINEAR	·	1.9 km	MPC · JPL
270542	2002 GU_{125}	—	April 12, 2002	Socorro	LINEAR	·	890 m	MPC · JPL
270543	2002 GY_{128}	—	April 12, 2002	Socorro	LINEAR	·	2.9 km	MPC · JPL
270544	2002 GO_{134}	—	April 12, 2002	Socorro	LINEAR	·	2.6 km	MPC · JPL
270545	2002 GT_{136}	—	April 12, 2002	Socorro	LINEAR	·	2.5 km	MPC · JPL
270546	2002 GY_{139}	—	April 13, 2002	Kitt Peak	Spacewatch	·	2.1 km	MPC · JPL
270547	2002 GD_{154}	—	April 12, 2002	Palomar	NEAT	·	2.5 km	MPC · JPL
270548	2002 GC_{161}	—	April 15, 2002	Anderson Mesa	LONEOS	·	2.4 km	MPC · JPL
270549	2002 GF_{163}	—	April 14, 2002	Palomar	NEAT	·	2.1 km	MPC · JPL
270550	2002 GV_{165}	—	April 15, 2002	Palomar	NEAT	·	4.5 km	MPC · JPL
270551	2002 GV_{166}	—	April 12, 2002	Palomar	NEAT	·	3.6 km	MPC · JPL
270552	2002 GW_{172}	—	April 10, 2002	Socorro	LINEAR	·	2.9 km	MPC · JPL
270553 Loureed	2002 GG_{178}	Loureed	April 12, 2002	Palomar	M. Meyer	·	2.8 km	MPC · JPL
270554	2002 GP_{179}	—	April 11, 2002	Palomar	NEAT	·	3.1 km	MPC · JPL
270555	2002 GC_{180}	—	April 8, 2002	Palomar	NEAT	·	2.2 km	MPC · JPL
270556 Kolonica	2002 GX_{182}	Kolonica	April 9, 2002	Palomar	NEAT	·	2.0 km	MPC · JPL
270557	2002 GS_{183}	—	April 9, 2002	Palomar	NEAT	·	2.1 km	MPC · JPL
270558 Nemiroff	2002 GB_{185}	Nemiroff	April 9, 2002	Palomar	NEAT	·	2.6 km	MPC · JPL
270559	2002 GY_{185}	—	April 9, 2002	Palomar	NEAT	HYG	3.6 km	MPC · JPL
270560	2002 GL_{187}	—	April 8, 2002	Palomar	NEAT	·	2.7 km	MPC · JPL
270561	2002 GF_{188}	—	April 13, 2002	Palomar	NEAT	WIT · fast	1.5 km	MPC · JPL
270562	2002 GC_{189}	—	April 9, 2002	Palomar	NEAT	HOF	3.1 km	MPC · JPL
270563	2002 HS_{7}	—	April 19, 2002	Kitt Peak	Spacewatch	DOR	4.1 km	MPC · JPL
270564	2002 HU_{9}	—	April 17, 2002	Socorro	LINEAR	·	2.6 km	MPC · JPL
270565	2002 HO_{12}	—	April 20, 2002	Palomar	NEAT	·	3.2 km	MPC · JPL
270566	2002 JD_{7}	—	May 3, 2002	Palomar	NEAT	(13314)	2.9 km	MPC · JPL
270567	2002 JF_{16}	—	May 7, 2002	Palomar	NEAT	·	4.4 km	MPC · JPL
270568	2002 JR_{17}	—	May 7, 2002	Palomar	NEAT	·	2.1 km	MPC · JPL
270569	2002 JH_{41}	—	May 8, 2002	Socorro	LINEAR	AEO	1.8 km	MPC · JPL
270570	2002 JV_{41}	—	May 8, 2002	Socorro	LINEAR	·	2.7 km	MPC · JPL
270571	2002 JS_{68}	—	May 6, 2002	Socorro	LINEAR	·	3.6 km	MPC · JPL
270572	2002 JC_{69}	—	May 7, 2002	Socorro	LINEAR	·	4.3 km	MPC · JPL
270573	2002 JD_{76}	—	May 11, 2002	Socorro	LINEAR	EUN	1.8 km	MPC · JPL
270574	2002 JL_{77}	—	May 11, 2002	Socorro	LINEAR	·	1.1 km	MPC · JPL
270575	2002 JY_{78}	—	May 11, 2002	Socorro	LINEAR	(2076)	1.1 km	MPC · JPL
270576	2002 JQ_{81}	—	May 11, 2002	Socorro	LINEAR	·	2.5 km	MPC · JPL
270577	2002 JD_{89}	—	May 11, 2002	Socorro	LINEAR	·	750 m	MPC · JPL
270578	2002 JE_{91}	—	May 11, 2002	Socorro	LINEAR	·	2.6 km	MPC · JPL
270579	2002 JM_{99}	—	May 13, 2002	Palomar	NEAT	EUN	2.1 km	MPC · JPL
270580	2002 JR_{113}	—	May 15, 2002	Palomar	NEAT	·	3.4 km	MPC · JPL
270581	2002 JT_{115}	—	May 9, 2002	Palomar	NEAT	·	2.5 km	MPC · JPL
270582	2002 JY_{144}	—	May 13, 2002	Palomar	NEAT	·	3.6 km	MPC · JPL
270583	2002 JK_{145}	—	May 14, 2002	Anderson Mesa	LONEOS	·	2.1 km	MPC · JPL
270584 Vlasta	2002 JG_{150}	Vlasta	May 7, 2002	Palomar	NEAT	·	2.0 km	MPC · JPL
270585	2002 KM	—	May 16, 2002	Socorro	LINEAR	·	2.5 km	MPC · JPL
270586	2002 KA_{3}	—	May 18, 2002	Palomar	NEAT	·	2.4 km	MPC · JPL
270587	2002 LJ_{1}	—	June 2, 2002	Palomar	NEAT	DOR	4.3 km	MPC · JPL
270588 Laurieanderson	2002 LA_{6}	Laurieanderson	June 7, 2002	Haleakala	NEAT	·	1.4 km	MPC · JPL
270589	2002 LN_{8}	—	June 5, 2002	Socorro	LINEAR	·	2.5 km	MPC · JPL
270590	2002 LP_{22}	—	June 8, 2002	Socorro	LINEAR	·	2.9 km	MPC · JPL
270591	2002 LN_{42}	—	June 10, 2002	Socorro	LINEAR	DOR	3.0 km	MPC · JPL
270592	2002 LP_{48}	—	June 10, 2002	Palomar	NEAT	·	3.7 km	MPC · JPL
270593	2002 LO_{49}	—	June 7, 2002	Haleakala	NEAT	·	3.5 km	MPC · JPL
270594	2002 LQ_{51}	—	June 9, 2002	Socorro	LINEAR	·	4.3 km	MPC · JPL
270595	2002 LZ_{61}	—	June 3, 2002	Palomar	NEAT	·	740 m	MPC · JPL
270596	2002 NS_{15}	—	July 5, 2002	Socorro	LINEAR	·	4.1 km	MPC · JPL
270597	2002 NK_{29}	—	July 7, 2002	Needville	J. Dellinger, P. G. A. Garossino	·	3.1 km	MPC · JPL
270598	2002 NS_{35}	—	July 9, 2002	Socorro	LINEAR	·	1.2 km	MPC · JPL
270599	2002 NK_{36}	—	July 9, 2002	Socorro	LINEAR	TEL	2.4 km	MPC · JPL
270600	2002 NC_{47}	—	July 12, 2002	Palomar	NEAT	·	2.7 km	MPC · JPL

== 270601–270700 ==
back to top

Designation			Discovery			Properties		Ref
Permanent	Provisional	Named after	Date	Site	Discoverer(s)	Category	Diam.	Ref
270601 Frauenstein	2002 NN_{57}	Frauenstein	July 14, 2002	Palomar	M. Meyer	·	2.1 km	MPC · JPL
270602	2002 NH_{59}	—	July 8, 2002	Palomar	NEAT	EOS	2.8 km	MPC · JPL
270603	2002 NZ_{60}	—	July 5, 2002	Palomar	NEAT	·	860 m	MPC · JPL
270604	2002 NL_{65}	—	July 14, 2002	Palomar	NEAT	·	3.2 km	MPC · JPL
270605	2002 NF_{66}	—	July 9, 2002	Palomar	NEAT	·	860 m	MPC · JPL
270606	2002 NF_{68}	—	July 12, 2002	Palomar	NEAT	·	3.6 km	MPC · JPL
270607	2002 NO_{68}	—	July 8, 2002	Palomar	NEAT	·	2.3 km	MPC · JPL
270608	2002 NP_{74}	—	July 12, 2002	Palomar	NEAT	EOS	2.5 km	MPC · JPL
270609	2002 NR_{74}	—	July 14, 2002	Palomar	NEAT	·	780 m	MPC · JPL
270610	2002 OS_{19}	—	July 27, 2002	Palomar	NEAT	·	5.7 km	MPC · JPL
270611	2002 OO_{22}	—	July 31, 2002	Powell	Powell	·	2.9 km	MPC · JPL
270612	2002 OK_{24}	—	July 30, 2002	Haleakala	NEAT	·	4.8 km	MPC · JPL
270613	2002 OY_{29}	—	July 22, 2002	Palomar	NEAT	·	2.0 km	MPC · JPL
270614	2002 OX_{30}	—	July 21, 2002	Palomar	NEAT	·	2.3 km	MPC · JPL
270615	2002 OY_{34}	—	January 16, 2005	Kitt Peak	Spacewatch	·	4.1 km	MPC · JPL
270616	2002 PC_{3}	—	August 3, 2002	Palomar	NEAT	·	3.9 km	MPC · JPL
270617	2002 PA_{9}	—	August 5, 2002	Palomar	NEAT	·	2.2 km	MPC · JPL
270618	2002 PL_{23}	—	August 6, 2002	Palomar	NEAT	·	740 m	MPC · JPL
270619	2002 PM_{26}	—	August 6, 2002	Palomar	NEAT	EMA	5.1 km	MPC · JPL
270620	2002 PD_{27}	—	August 6, 2002	Palomar	NEAT	·	820 m	MPC · JPL
270621	2002 PE_{27}	—	August 6, 2002	Palomar	NEAT	·	3.4 km	MPC · JPL
270622	2002 PK_{28}	—	August 6, 2002	Palomar	NEAT	·	920 m	MPC · JPL
270623	2002 PF_{29}	—	August 6, 2002	Palomar	NEAT	EOS	2.3 km	MPC · JPL
270624	2002 PU_{29}	—	August 6, 2002	Palomar	NEAT	·	6.1 km	MPC · JPL
270625	2002 PO_{30}	—	August 6, 2002	Palomar	NEAT	EOS	2.8 km	MPC · JPL
270626	2002 PA_{34}	—	August 6, 2002	Campo Imperatore	CINEOS	·	3.9 km	MPC · JPL
270627	2002 PE_{34}	—	August 7, 2002	Reedy Creek	J. Broughton	·	1.1 km	MPC · JPL
270628	2002 PU_{34}	—	August 5, 2002	Campo Imperatore	CINEOS	·	890 m	MPC · JPL
270629	2002 PB_{35}	—	August 5, 2002	Campo Imperatore	CINEOS	·	2.4 km	MPC · JPL
270630	2002 PB_{51}	—	August 7, 2002	Palomar	NEAT	EOS	2.5 km	MPC · JPL
270631	2002 PC_{61}	—	August 11, 2002	Socorro	LINEAR	·	2.3 km	MPC · JPL
270632	2002 PY_{64}	—	August 5, 2002	Palomar	NEAT	EOS	3.0 km	MPC · JPL
270633	2002 PG_{70}	—	August 11, 2002	Socorro	LINEAR	·	3.0 km	MPC · JPL
270634	2002 PW_{71}	—	August 12, 2002	Socorro	LINEAR	·	3.2 km	MPC · JPL
270635	2002 PF_{73}	—	August 12, 2002	Socorro	LINEAR	EOS	2.5 km	MPC · JPL
270636	2002 PA_{76}	—	August 8, 2002	Palomar	NEAT	EOS	2.3 km	MPC · JPL
270637	2002 PO_{78}	—	August 11, 2002	Palomar	NEAT	·	880 m	MPC · JPL
270638	2002 PP_{78}	—	August 11, 2002	Palomar	NEAT	·	1.1 km	MPC · JPL
270639	2002 PG_{87}	—	August 11, 2002	Palomar	NEAT	·	5.9 km	MPC · JPL
270640	2002 PO_{88}	—	August 12, 2002	Haleakala	NEAT	·	2.9 km	MPC · JPL
270641	2002 PP_{95}	—	August 14, 2002	Socorro	LINEAR	·	1.7 km	MPC · JPL
270642	2002 PC_{102}	—	August 12, 2002	Socorro	LINEAR	·	910 m	MPC · JPL
270643	2002 PM_{107}	—	August 13, 2002	Palomar	NEAT	EOS	2.4 km	MPC · JPL
270644	2002 PH_{112}	—	August 5, 2002	Palomar	NEAT	·	3.5 km	MPC · JPL
270645	2002 PR_{112}	—	August 11, 2002	Socorro	LINEAR	·	4.3 km	MPC · JPL
270646	2002 PD_{122}	—	August 13, 2002	Anderson Mesa	LONEOS	·	1.1 km	MPC · JPL
270647	2002 PD_{125}	—	August 14, 2002	Socorro	LINEAR	EOS	2.5 km	MPC · JPL
270648	2002 PK_{130}	—	August 13, 2002	Socorro	LINEAR	·	3.4 km	MPC · JPL
270649	2002 PM_{140}	—	August 14, 2002	Bergisch Gladbach	W. Bickel	·	3.0 km	MPC · JPL
270650	2002 PA_{145}	—	August 9, 2002	Cerro Tololo	M. W. Buie	EOS ·	4.4 km	MPC · JPL
270651	2002 PX_{159}	—	August 8, 2002	Palomar	S. F. Hönig	·	1.9 km	MPC · JPL
270652	2002 PT_{160}	—	August 8, 2002	Palomar	S. F. Hönig	EOS	2.7 km	MPC · JPL
270653	2002 PX_{161}	—	August 8, 2002	Palomar	S. F. Hönig	·	3.1 km	MPC · JPL
270654	2002 PX_{165}	—	August 8, 2002	Palomar	Lowe, A.	·	3.3 km	MPC · JPL
270655	2002 PQ_{166}	—	August 11, 2002	Needville	J. Dellinger, W. G. Dillon	·	3.8 km	MPC · JPL
270656	2002 PJ_{168}	—	August 11, 2002	Palomar	NEAT	·	4.5 km	MPC · JPL
270657	2002 PE_{169}	—	August 8, 2002	Palomar	NEAT	VER	3.6 km	MPC · JPL
270658	2002 PG_{169}	—	August 8, 2002	Palomar	NEAT	·	880 m	MPC · JPL
270659	2002 PU_{178}	—	August 13, 2002	Palomar	NEAT	·	690 m	MPC · JPL
270660	2002 PC_{186}	—	August 13, 2002	Palomar	NEAT	·	3.4 km	MPC · JPL
270661	2002 PF_{186}	—	August 13, 2002	Anderson Mesa	LONEOS	·	5.4 km	MPC · JPL
270662	2002 PA_{187}	—	August 11, 2002	Palomar	NEAT	TEL	2.0 km	MPC · JPL
270663	2002 PY_{187}	—	August 8, 2002	Palomar	NEAT	·	850 m	MPC · JPL
270664	2002 PQ_{188}	—	August 14, 2002	Palomar	NEAT	·	3.8 km	MPC · JPL
270665	2002 PH_{189}	—	August 7, 2002	Palomar	NEAT	·	930 m	MPC · JPL
270666	2002 PQ_{189}	—	August 8, 2002	Palomar	NEAT	·	3.8 km	MPC · JPL
270667	2002 PF_{190}	—	August 13, 2002	Palomar	NEAT	·	7.7 km	MPC · JPL
270668	2002 PV_{190}	—	August 15, 2002	Palomar	NEAT	EOS	2.2 km	MPC · JPL
270669	2002 PG_{194}	—	November 19, 2003	Anderson Mesa	LONEOS	EOS	3.0 km	MPC · JPL
270670	2002 PT_{194}	—	July 18, 2007	Mount Lemmon	Mount Lemmon Survey	·	2.0 km	MPC · JPL
270671	2002 QT	—	August 16, 2002	Kitt Peak	Spacewatch	·	2.5 km	MPC · JPL
270672	2002 QB_{7}	—	August 16, 2002	Socorro	LINEAR	T_{j} (2.99)	6.2 km	MPC · JPL
270673	2002 QF_{8}	—	August 19, 2002	Palomar	NEAT	·	3.8 km	MPC · JPL
270674	2002 QP_{9}	—	August 20, 2002	Palomar	NEAT	·	1.3 km	MPC · JPL
270675	2002 QB_{10}	—	August 19, 2002	Kvistaberg	Uppsala-DLR Asteroid Survey	·	2.7 km	MPC · JPL
270676	2002 QJ_{25}	—	August 29, 2002	Kitt Peak	Spacewatch	·	1.8 km	MPC · JPL
270677	2002 QU_{26}	—	August 29, 2002	Palomar	NEAT	EOS	2.3 km	MPC · JPL
270678	2002 QE_{30}	—	August 29, 2002	Palomar	NEAT	·	1.1 km	MPC · JPL
270679	2002 QV_{31}	—	August 29, 2002	Palomar	NEAT	·	3.6 km	MPC · JPL
270680	2002 QW_{32}	—	August 29, 2002	Palomar	NEAT	·	4.7 km	MPC · JPL
270681	2002 QU_{36}	—	August 30, 2002	Kitt Peak	Spacewatch	·	970 m	MPC · JPL
270682	2002 QH_{37}	—	August 30, 2002	Kitt Peak	Spacewatch	·	3.5 km	MPC · JPL
270683	2002 QG_{38}	—	August 30, 2002	Kitt Peak	Spacewatch	·	4.6 km	MPC · JPL
270684	2002 QY_{38}	—	August 30, 2002	Kitt Peak	Spacewatch	·	2.1 km	MPC · JPL
270685	2002 QW_{39}	—	August 27, 2002	Palomar	NEAT	·	5.3 km	MPC · JPL
270686	2002 QK_{45}	—	August 30, 2002	Kitt Peak	Spacewatch	·	3.4 km	MPC · JPL
270687	2002 QO_{47}	—	August 30, 2002	Anderson Mesa	LONEOS	·	4.7 km	MPC · JPL
270688	2002 QK_{49}	—	August 18, 2002	Palomar	S. F. Hönig	·	3.7 km	MPC · JPL
270689	2002 QW_{51}	—	August 29, 2002	Palomar	S. F. Hönig	·	2.9 km	MPC · JPL
270690	2002 QF_{52}	—	August 29, 2002	Palomar	S. F. Hönig	·	1.8 km	MPC · JPL
270691	2002 QK_{53}	—	August 29, 2002	Palomar	S. F. Hönig	MAS	880 m	MPC · JPL
270692	2002 QB_{54}	—	August 29, 2002	Palomar	S. F. Hönig	·	700 m	MPC · JPL
270693	2002 QO_{55}	—	August 29, 2002	Palomar	S. F. Hönig	·	3.4 km	MPC · JPL
270694	2002 QQ_{59}	—	August 16, 2002	Palomar	NEAT	·	2.3 km	MPC · JPL
270695	2002 QF_{61}	—	August 16, 2002	Palomar	NEAT	·	2.5 km	MPC · JPL
270696	2002 QX_{63}	—	August 30, 2002	Palomar	NEAT	EOS	2.1 km	MPC · JPL
270697	2002 QP_{65}	—	August 16, 2002	Haleakala	NEAT	EOS	3.0 km	MPC · JPL
270698	2002 QK_{69}	—	August 28, 2002	Palomar	NEAT	·	720 m	MPC · JPL
270699	2002 QE_{70}	—	August 27, 2002	Palomar	NEAT	·	1.9 km	MPC · JPL
270700	2002 QB_{76}	—	August 29, 2002	Palomar	NEAT	·	3.1 km	MPC · JPL

== 270701–270800 ==
back to top

Designation			Discovery			Properties		Ref
Permanent	Provisional	Named after	Date	Site	Discoverer(s)	Category	Diam.	Ref
270701	2002 QJ_{76}	—	August 18, 2002	Palomar	NEAT	·	2.5 km	MPC · JPL
270702	2002 QU_{77}	—	August 26, 2002	Palomar	NEAT	·	5.2 km	MPC · JPL
270703	2002 QA_{79}	—	August 28, 2002	Palomar	NEAT	·	2.3 km	MPC · JPL
270704	2002 QM_{82}	—	August 17, 2002	Palomar	NEAT	·	2.8 km	MPC · JPL
270705	2002 QK_{84}	—	August 16, 2002	Palomar	NEAT	EOS	4.3 km	MPC · JPL
270706	2002 QD_{85}	—	August 17, 2002	Palomar	NEAT	VER	3.1 km	MPC · JPL
270707	2002 QU_{88}	—	August 27, 2002	Palomar	NEAT	·	4.0 km	MPC · JPL
270708	2002 QO_{92}	—	August 29, 2002	Palomar	NEAT	EOS	2.1 km	MPC · JPL
270709	2002 QB_{93}	—	August 19, 2002	Palomar	NEAT	EOS ·	5.2 km	MPC · JPL
270710	2002 QT_{93}	—	August 29, 2002	Palomar	NEAT	·	3.9 km	MPC · JPL
270711	2002 QU_{96}	—	August 18, 2002	Palomar	NEAT	·	3.5 km	MPC · JPL
270712	2002 QO_{97}	—	August 18, 2002	Palomar	NEAT	THM	2.5 km	MPC · JPL
270713	2002 QP_{99}	—	August 18, 2002	Palomar	NEAT	·	3.4 km	MPC · JPL
270714	2002 QQ_{104}	—	August 26, 2002	Palomar	NEAT	·	3.7 km	MPC · JPL
270715	2002 QU_{104}	—	August 26, 2002	Palomar	NEAT	·	980 m	MPC · JPL
270716	2002 QW_{108}	—	August 17, 2002	Palomar	NEAT	THM	2.4 km	MPC · JPL
270717	2002 QU_{111}	—	August 17, 2002	Palomar	NEAT	V	820 m	MPC · JPL
270718	2002 QV_{111}	—	August 27, 2002	Palomar	NEAT	·	3.4 km	MPC · JPL
270719	2002 QZ_{111}	—	August 27, 2002	Palomar	NEAT	·	830 m	MPC · JPL
270720	2002 QN_{113}	—	August 27, 2002	Palomar	NEAT	·	5.1 km	MPC · JPL
270721	2002 QZ_{113}	—	August 27, 2002	Palomar	NEAT	VER	3.5 km	MPC · JPL
270722	2002 QE_{116}	—	August 19, 2002	Palomar	NEAT	·	3.7 km	MPC · JPL
270723	2002 QJ_{116}	—	August 18, 2002	Palomar	NEAT	EOS	2.3 km	MPC · JPL
270724	2002 QQ_{117}	—	August 26, 2002	Palomar	NEAT	(2076)	790 m	MPC · JPL
270725 Evka	2002 QL_{122}	Evka	August 20, 2002	Palomar	NEAT	·	3.2 km	MPC · JPL
270726	2002 QS_{122}	—	August 28, 2002	Palomar	NEAT	·	3.8 km	MPC · JPL
270727	2002 QY_{122}	—	August 30, 2002	Palomar	NEAT	·	910 m	MPC · JPL
270728	2002 QP_{123}	—	August 29, 2002	Palomar	NEAT	·	1.9 km	MPC · JPL
270729	2002 QF_{127}	—	August 18, 2002	Palomar	NEAT	·	4.9 km	MPC · JPL
270730	2002 QE_{130}	—	August 17, 2002	Palomar	NEAT	·	2.0 km	MPC · JPL
270731	2002 QO_{130}	—	August 30, 2002	Palomar	NEAT	·	870 m	MPC · JPL
270732	2002 QO_{132}	—	August 16, 2002	Palomar	NEAT	·	2.6 km	MPC · JPL
270733	2002 QA_{135}	—	August 30, 2002	Palomar	NEAT	·	2.4 km	MPC · JPL
270734	2002 QC_{144}	—	September 14, 2007	Mount Lemmon	Mount Lemmon Survey	·	1.5 km	MPC · JPL
270735	2002 QE_{144}	—	March 11, 2005	Mount Lemmon	Mount Lemmon Survey	VER	3.2 km	MPC · JPL
270736	2002 QS_{144}	—	November 2, 2007	Mount Lemmon	Mount Lemmon Survey	·	1.6 km	MPC · JPL
270737	2002 QX_{144}	—	October 2, 1997	Kitt Peak	Spacewatch	·	3.0 km	MPC · JPL
270738	2002 RL_{9}	—	September 4, 2002	Palomar	NEAT	·	1.2 km	MPC · JPL
270739	2002 RC_{10}	—	September 4, 2002	Palomar	NEAT	V	770 m	MPC · JPL
270740	2002 RD_{13}	—	September 4, 2002	Anderson Mesa	LONEOS	·	1.5 km	MPC · JPL
270741	2002 RR_{17}	—	September 4, 2002	Anderson Mesa	LONEOS	EMA	5.2 km	MPC · JPL
270742	2002 RV_{28}	—	September 6, 2002	Socorro	LINEAR	·	1.1 km	MPC · JPL
270743	2002 RD_{33}	—	September 4, 2002	Anderson Mesa	LONEOS	·	1.7 km	MPC · JPL
270744	2002 RG_{36}	—	September 5, 2002	Anderson Mesa	LONEOS	·	4.2 km	MPC · JPL
270745	2002 RF_{46}	—	September 5, 2002	Socorro	LINEAR	EOS ·	5.8 km	MPC · JPL
270746	2002 RP_{48}	—	September 5, 2002	Socorro	LINEAR	·	1.2 km	MPC · JPL
270747	2002 RH_{51}	—	September 5, 2002	Socorro	LINEAR	slow	4.0 km	MPC · JPL
270748	2002 RV_{52}	—	September 5, 2002	Anderson Mesa	LONEOS	·	3.1 km	MPC · JPL
270749	2002 RE_{53}	—	September 5, 2002	Socorro	LINEAR	EOS	5.6 km	MPC · JPL
270750	2002 RP_{57}	—	September 5, 2002	Anderson Mesa	LONEOS	·	1.2 km	MPC · JPL
270751	2002 RS_{58}	—	September 5, 2002	Socorro	LINEAR	·	950 m	MPC · JPL
270752	2002 RG_{59}	—	September 5, 2002	Anderson Mesa	LONEOS	·	970 m	MPC · JPL
270753	2002 RJ_{61}	—	September 5, 2002	Socorro	LINEAR	·	1.1 km	MPC · JPL
270754	2002 RH_{62}	—	September 5, 2002	Socorro	LINEAR	·	1.6 km	MPC · JPL
270755	2002 RR_{68}	—	September 4, 2002	Anderson Mesa	LONEOS	·	900 m	MPC · JPL
270756	2002 RW_{78}	—	September 5, 2002	Socorro	LINEAR	·	3.4 km	MPC · JPL
270757	2002 RL_{79}	—	September 5, 2002	Socorro	LINEAR	·	1.4 km	MPC · JPL
270758	2002 RT_{79}	—	September 5, 2002	Socorro	LINEAR	·	1 km	MPC · JPL
270759	2002 RE_{91}	—	September 5, 2002	Socorro	LINEAR	·	5.2 km	MPC · JPL
270760	2002 RY_{94}	—	September 5, 2002	Socorro	LINEAR	ERI	1.8 km	MPC · JPL
270761	2002 RS_{109}	—	September 6, 2002	Socorro	LINEAR	EOS	2.9 km	MPC · JPL
270762	2002 RZ_{124}	—	September 3, 2002	Palomar	NEAT	·	1.0 km	MPC · JPL
270763	2002 RE_{129}	—	September 10, 2002	Haleakala	NEAT	·	4.3 km	MPC · JPL
270764	2002 RG_{136}	—	September 11, 2002	Haleakala	NEAT	LIX	4.1 km	MPC · JPL
270765	2002 RQ_{136}	—	September 11, 2002	Haleakala	NEAT	·	2.5 km	MPC · JPL
270766	2002 RK_{141}	—	September 10, 2002	Haleakala	NEAT	·	670 m	MPC · JPL
270767	2002 RE_{143}	—	September 11, 2002	Palomar	NEAT	·	1.1 km	MPC · JPL
270768	2002 RR_{145}	—	September 11, 2002	Palomar	NEAT	THM	3.0 km	MPC · JPL
270769	2002 RP_{151}	—	September 12, 2002	Palomar	NEAT	·	5.0 km	MPC · JPL
270770	2002 RK_{152}	—	September 12, 2002	Palomar	NEAT	·	1.5 km	MPC · JPL
270771	2002 RA_{153}	—	September 12, 2002	Palomar	NEAT	LIX	5.1 km	MPC · JPL
270772	2002 RK_{158}	—	September 11, 2002	Palomar	NEAT	·	1.0 km	MPC · JPL
270773	2002 RY_{160}	—	September 12, 2002	Palomar	NEAT	·	3.8 km	MPC · JPL
270774	2002 RZ_{165}	—	September 13, 2002	Palomar	NEAT	·	1.1 km	MPC · JPL
270775	2002 RR_{168}	—	September 13, 2002	Palomar	NEAT	·	3.9 km	MPC · JPL
270776	2002 RU_{170}	—	September 13, 2002	Palomar	NEAT	·	3.6 km	MPC · JPL
270777	2002 RS_{176}	—	September 13, 2002	Palomar	NEAT	·	2.5 km	MPC · JPL
270778	2002 RM_{184}	—	September 12, 2002	Palomar	NEAT	·	5.2 km	MPC · JPL
270779	2002 RR_{189}	—	September 14, 2002	Palomar	NEAT	EOS	2.7 km	MPC · JPL
270780	2002 RX_{196}	—	September 12, 2002	Haleakala	NEAT	V	820 m	MPC · JPL
270781	2002 RT_{200}	—	September 13, 2002	Socorro	LINEAR	·	2.7 km	MPC · JPL
270782	2002 RG_{201}	—	September 13, 2002	Socorro	LINEAR	·	4.2 km	MPC · JPL
270783	2002 RU_{203}	—	September 14, 2002	Palomar	NEAT	·	5.3 km	MPC · JPL
270784	2002 RR_{205}	—	September 14, 2002	Palomar	NEAT	·	3.7 km	MPC · JPL
270785	2002 RN_{212}	—	September 11, 2002	Haleakala	NEAT	·	4.5 km	MPC · JPL
270786	2002 RL_{218}	—	September 14, 2002	Haleakala	NEAT	·	4.8 km	MPC · JPL
270787	2002 RV_{218}	—	September 15, 2002	Palomar	NEAT	EOS ·	5.2 km	MPC · JPL
270788	2002 RP_{219}	—	September 15, 2002	Palomar	NEAT	·	3.7 km	MPC · JPL
270789	2002 RA_{220}	—	September 15, 2002	Palomar	NEAT	·	3.3 km	MPC · JPL
270790	2002 RP_{224}	—	September 13, 2002	Anderson Mesa	LONEOS	·	930 m	MPC · JPL
270791	2002 RB_{225}	—	September 13, 2002	Palomar	NEAT	HYG	3.5 km	MPC · JPL
270792	2002 RK_{225}	—	September 13, 2002	Palomar	NEAT	·	1.0 km	MPC · JPL
270793	2002 RO_{226}	—	September 5, 2002	Socorro	LINEAR	·	1.3 km	MPC · JPL
270794	2002 RK_{231}	—	September 14, 2002	Palomar	NEAT	·	3.2 km	MPC · JPL
270795	2002 RX_{231}	—	September 14, 2002	Palomar	NEAT	·	5.2 km	MPC · JPL
270796	2002 RX_{232}	—	September 2, 2002	Haleakala	S. F. Hönig	·	3.4 km	MPC · JPL
270797	2002 RF_{234}	—	September 14, 2002	Palomar	R. Matson	·	4.0 km	MPC · JPL
270798	2002 RN_{234}	—	September 14, 2002	Palomar	R. Matson	·	6.0 km	MPC · JPL
270799	2002 RZ_{234}	—	September 14, 2002	Palomar	R. Matson	EOS	2.3 km	MPC · JPL
270800	2002 RL_{237}	—	September 15, 2002	Palomar	R. Matson	·	710 m	MPC · JPL

== 270801–270900 ==
back to top

Designation			Discovery			Properties		Ref
Permanent	Provisional	Named after	Date	Site	Discoverer(s)	Category	Diam.	Ref
270801	2002 RG_{243}	—	September 10, 2002	Palomar	NEAT	EUP	4.1 km	MPC · JPL
270802	2002 RQ_{248}	—	September 15, 2002	Palomar	NEAT	·	3.1 km	MPC · JPL
270803	2002 RD_{249}	—	September 14, 2002	Palomar	NEAT	·	2.7 km	MPC · JPL
270804	2002 RB_{250}	—	September 13, 2002	Palomar	NEAT	·	910 m	MPC · JPL
270805	2002 RA_{254}	—	September 14, 2002	Palomar	NEAT	·	4.1 km	MPC · JPL
270806	2002 RW_{257}	—	September 14, 2002	Palomar	NEAT	·	690 m	MPC · JPL
270807	2002 RW_{261}	—	September 14, 2002	Haleakala	NEAT	·	5.4 km	MPC · JPL
270808	2002 RS_{264}	—	September 13, 2002	Palomar	NEAT	·	1.1 km	MPC · JPL
270809	2002 RN_{266}	—	September 15, 2002	Palomar	NEAT	MAS	800 m	MPC · JPL
270810	2002 RC_{267}	—	September 14, 2002	Palomar	NEAT	·	4.3 km	MPC · JPL
270811	2002 RY_{267}	—	September 14, 2002	Palomar	NEAT	·	910 m	MPC · JPL
270812	2002 RG_{268}	—	September 4, 2002	Palomar	NEAT	EOS	2.3 km	MPC · JPL
270813	2002 RR_{269}	—	September 4, 2002	Palomar	NEAT	·	890 m	MPC · JPL
270814	2002 RP_{270}	—	September 4, 2002	Palomar	NEAT	·	2.5 km	MPC · JPL
270815	2002 RS_{272}	—	September 4, 2002	Palomar	NEAT	·	810 m	MPC · JPL
270816	2002 RR_{277}	—	September 4, 2002	Palomar	NEAT	·	4.8 km	MPC · JPL
270817	2002 SB_{1}	—	September 26, 2002	Palomar	NEAT	·	2.3 km	MPC · JPL
270818	2002 SU_{1}	—	September 26, 2002	Palomar	NEAT	HYG	3.9 km	MPC · JPL
270819	2002 SW_{3}	—	September 26, 2002	Palomar	NEAT	·	4.0 km	MPC · JPL
270820	2002 SF_{4}	—	September 27, 2002	Palomar	NEAT	T_{j} (2.96)	5.5 km	MPC · JPL
270821	2002 SU_{14}	—	September 27, 2002	Anderson Mesa	LONEOS	·	1.2 km	MPC · JPL
270822	2002 SY_{17}	—	September 26, 2002	Palomar	NEAT	·	1.2 km	MPC · JPL
270823	2002 SL_{20}	—	September 26, 2002	Palomar	NEAT	EOS	4.7 km	MPC · JPL
270824	2002 SV_{21}	—	September 26, 2002	Palomar	NEAT	·	1.5 km	MPC · JPL
270825	2002 SG_{22}	—	September 26, 2002	Palomar	NEAT	T_{j} (2.99)	4.3 km	MPC · JPL
270826	2002 SJ_{26}	—	September 28, 2002	Haleakala	NEAT	·	2.4 km	MPC · JPL
270827	2002 SM_{26}	—	September 29, 2002	Haleakala	NEAT	·	920 m	MPC · JPL
270828	2002 SS_{26}	—	September 29, 2002	Haleakala	NEAT	·	1.1 km	MPC · JPL
270829	2002 SJ_{28}	—	September 30, 2002	Ondřejov	P. Pravec	·	3.8 km	MPC · JPL
270830	2002 SE_{35}	—	September 29, 2002	Haleakala	NEAT	·	4.8 km	MPC · JPL
270831	2002 SQ_{35}	—	September 29, 2002	Haleakala	NEAT	·	5.2 km	MPC · JPL
270832	2002 SF_{44}	—	September 29, 2002	Eskridge	Farpoint	·	1.0 km	MPC · JPL
270833	2002 SS_{48}	—	September 30, 2002	Socorro	LINEAR	NYS	1.5 km	MPC · JPL
270834	2002 SH_{66}	—	September 16, 2002	Palomar	NEAT	·	890 m	MPC · JPL
270835	2002 SE_{69}	—	September 26, 2002	Palomar	NEAT	MAS	570 m	MPC · JPL
270836	2002 SA_{70}	—	September 26, 2002	Palomar	NEAT	EOS	2.3 km	MPC · JPL
270837	2002 SY_{72}	—	September 16, 2002	Palomar	NEAT	·	3.5 km	MPC · JPL
270838	2002 TF_{2}	—	October 1, 2002	Anderson Mesa	LONEOS	·	1.3 km	MPC · JPL
270839	2002 TH_{2}	—	October 1, 2002	Anderson Mesa	LONEOS	·	1.1 km	MPC · JPL
270840	2002 TH_{7}	—	October 1, 2002	Anderson Mesa	LONEOS	·	6.1 km	MPC · JPL
270841	2002 TW_{9}	—	October 1, 2002	Anderson Mesa	LONEOS	NYS	1.5 km	MPC · JPL
270842	2002 TZ_{11}	—	October 1, 2002	Anderson Mesa	LONEOS	·	890 m	MPC · JPL
270843	2002 TS_{15}	—	October 2, 2002	Socorro	LINEAR	NYS	1.3 km	MPC · JPL
270844	2002 TC_{18}	—	October 2, 2002	Socorro	LINEAR	·	5.2 km	MPC · JPL
270845	2002 TF_{19}	—	October 2, 2002	Socorro	LINEAR	·	3.7 km	MPC · JPL
270846	2002 TD_{21}	—	October 2, 2002	Socorro	LINEAR	·	3.2 km	MPC · JPL
270847	2002 TA_{22}	—	October 2, 2002	Socorro	LINEAR	MAS	820 m	MPC · JPL
270848	2002 TJ_{22}	—	October 2, 2002	Socorro	LINEAR	PHO	2.5 km	MPC · JPL
270849	2002 TA_{29}	—	October 2, 2002	Socorro	LINEAR	·	1.4 km	MPC · JPL
270850	2002 TN_{32}	—	October 2, 2002	Socorro	LINEAR	·	3.5 km	MPC · JPL
270851	2002 TC_{33}	—	October 2, 2002	Socorro	LINEAR	·	3.7 km	MPC · JPL
270852	2002 TB_{35}	—	October 2, 2002	Socorro	LINEAR	·	1.3 km	MPC · JPL
270853	2002 TG_{37}	—	October 2, 2002	Socorro	LINEAR	·	960 m	MPC · JPL
270854	2002 TW_{41}	—	October 2, 2002	Socorro	LINEAR	·	1.0 km	MPC · JPL
270855	2002 TO_{44}	—	October 2, 2002	Socorro	LINEAR	V	890 m	MPC · JPL
270856	2002 TC_{51}	—	October 2, 2002	Socorro	LINEAR	·	5.7 km	MPC · JPL
270857	2002 TX_{63}	—	October 4, 2002	Socorro	LINEAR	·	850 m	MPC · JPL
270858	2002 TZ_{69}	—	October 11, 2002	Dominion	Clem, J. L.	·	1.8 km	MPC · JPL
270859	2002 TA_{76}	—	October 1, 2002	Anderson Mesa	LONEOS	·	1.0 km	MPC · JPL
270860	2002 TT_{76}	—	October 1, 2002	Anderson Mesa	LONEOS	·	1.7 km	MPC · JPL
270861	2002 TF_{78}	—	October 1, 2002	Anderson Mesa	LONEOS	·	5.0 km	MPC · JPL
270862	2002 TP_{80}	—	October 1, 2002	Anderson Mesa	LONEOS	·	3.8 km	MPC · JPL
270863	2002 TH_{86}	—	October 2, 2002	Campo Imperatore	CINEOS	·	1.2 km	MPC · JPL
270864	2002 TM_{88}	—	October 3, 2002	Palomar	NEAT	·	6.7 km	MPC · JPL
270865	2002 TK_{92}	—	October 3, 2002	Socorro	LINEAR	·	1.0 km	MPC · JPL
270866	2002 TD_{93}	—	October 2, 2002	Socorro	LINEAR	·	3.9 km	MPC · JPL
270867	2002 TK_{97}	—	October 2, 2002	Socorro	LINEAR	·	4.1 km	MPC · JPL
270868	2002 TH_{98}	—	October 3, 2002	Socorro	LINEAR	·	920 m	MPC · JPL
270869	2002 TE_{99}	—	October 3, 2002	Campo Imperatore	CINEOS	·	3.7 km	MPC · JPL
270870	2002 TE_{123}	—	October 4, 2002	Palomar	NEAT	·	5.4 km	MPC · JPL
270871	2002 TA_{125}	—	October 4, 2002	Palomar	NEAT	·	930 m	MPC · JPL
270872	2002 TJ_{129}	—	October 4, 2002	Palomar	NEAT	(7605)	5.2 km	MPC · JPL
270873	2002 TM_{131}	—	October 4, 2002	Socorro	LINEAR	·	1.1 km	MPC · JPL
270874	2002 TQ_{134}	—	October 4, 2002	Palomar	NEAT	·	5.0 km	MPC · JPL
270875	2002 TF_{156}	—	October 5, 2002	Palomar	NEAT	3:2	6.3 km	MPC · JPL
270876	2002 TQ_{156}	—	October 5, 2002	Palomar	NEAT	·	3.8 km	MPC · JPL
270877	2002 TN_{185}	—	October 4, 2002	Socorro	LINEAR	·	4.0 km	MPC · JPL
270878	2002 TC_{186}	—	October 4, 2002	Socorro	LINEAR	·	950 m	MPC · JPL
270879	2002 TH_{187}	—	October 4, 2002	Socorro	LINEAR	·	1.4 km	MPC · JPL
270880	2002 TC_{190}	—	October 6, 2002	Socorro	LINEAR	·	1.6 km	MPC · JPL
270881	2002 TN_{190}	—	October 3, 2002	Socorro	LINEAR	HYG	4.2 km	MPC · JPL
270882	2002 TT_{193}	—	October 3, 2002	Socorro	LINEAR	·	950 m	MPC · JPL
270883	2002 TE_{197}	—	October 4, 2002	Socorro	LINEAR	·	1.2 km	MPC · JPL
270884	2002 TQ_{199}	—	October 5, 2002	Socorro	LINEAR	·	4.9 km	MPC · JPL
270885	2002 TU_{200}	—	October 7, 2002	Anderson Mesa	LONEOS	·	1.2 km	MPC · JPL
270886	2002 TR_{209}	—	October 6, 2002	Haleakala	NEAT	·	4.8 km	MPC · JPL
270887	2002 TE_{210}	—	October 7, 2002	Socorro	LINEAR	·	1.4 km	MPC · JPL
270888	2002 TE_{214}	—	October 3, 2002	Campo Imperatore	CINEOS	·	980 m	MPC · JPL
270889	2002 TV_{224}	—	October 8, 2002	Anderson Mesa	LONEOS	·	990 m	MPC · JPL
270890	2002 TC_{230}	—	October 9, 2002	Kitt Peak	Spacewatch	THM	2.5 km	MPC · JPL
270891	2002 TV_{236}	—	October 6, 2002	Socorro	LINEAR	·	3.7 km	MPC · JPL
270892	2002 TQ_{245}	—	October 9, 2002	Anderson Mesa	LONEOS	·	1.5 km	MPC · JPL
270893	2002 TO_{247}	—	October 7, 2002	Haleakala	NEAT	·	810 m	MPC · JPL
270894	2002 TC_{249}	—	October 7, 2002	Socorro	LINEAR	·	890 m	MPC · JPL
270895	2002 TE_{252}	—	October 8, 2002	Anderson Mesa	LONEOS	·	1.3 km	MPC · JPL
270896	2002 TY_{255}	—	October 9, 2002	Socorro	LINEAR	·	5.0 km	MPC · JPL
270897	2002 TR_{267}	—	October 8, 2002	Anderson Mesa	LONEOS	·	4.1 km	MPC · JPL
270898	2002 TW_{268}	—	October 9, 2002	Socorro	LINEAR	LIX	4.4 km	MPC · JPL
270899	2002 TV_{270}	—	October 9, 2002	Socorro	LINEAR	·	1.2 km	MPC · JPL
270900	2002 TH_{273}	—	October 9, 2002	Socorro	LINEAR	·	940 m	MPC · JPL

== 270901–271000 ==
back to top

Designation			Discovery			Properties		Ref
Permanent	Provisional	Named after	Date	Site	Discoverer(s)	Category	Diam.	Ref
270901	2002 TQ_{273}	—	October 9, 2002	Socorro	LINEAR	·	1.2 km	MPC · JPL
270902	2002 TG_{294}	—	October 11, 2002	Socorro	LINEAR	·	4.0 km	MPC · JPL
270903 Pakštienė	2002 TO_{303}	Pakštienė	October 5, 2002	Palomar	K. Černis	·	3.6 km	MPC · JPL
270904	2002 TT_{305}	—	October 4, 2002	Apache Point	SDSS	HYG	3.5 km	MPC · JPL
270905	2002 TW_{311}	—	October 4, 2002	Apache Point	SDSS	·	1.1 km	MPC · JPL
270906	2002 TN_{313}	—	October 4, 2002	Apache Point	SDSS	(31811)	4.1 km	MPC · JPL
270907	2002 TZ_{319}	—	October 5, 2002	Apache Point	SDSS	·	890 m	MPC · JPL
270908	2002 TE_{320}	—	October 5, 2002	Apache Point	SDSS	·	2.0 km	MPC · JPL
270909	2002 TE_{339}	—	October 5, 2002	Apache Point	SDSS	V	790 m	MPC · JPL
270910	2002 TD_{345}	—	October 5, 2002	Apache Point	SDSS	·	3.0 km	MPC · JPL
270911	2002 TF_{350}	—	October 10, 2002	Apache Point	SDSS	·	3.2 km	MPC · JPL
270912	2002 TE_{358}	—	October 10, 2002	Apache Point	SDSS	·	3.6 km	MPC · JPL
270913	2002 TU_{369}	—	October 10, 2002	Apache Point	SDSS	VER	4.4 km	MPC · JPL
270914	2002 TJ_{377}	—	October 9, 2002	Palomar	NEAT	EOS	2.6 km	MPC · JPL
270915	2002 TL_{377}	—	October 15, 2002	Palomar	NEAT	·	3.0 km	MPC · JPL
270916	2002 TA_{378}	—	October 3, 2002	Palomar	NEAT	EOS	3.1 km	MPC · JPL
270917	2002 TP_{380}	—	October 5, 2002	Palomar	NEAT	·	2.0 km	MPC · JPL
270918	2002 TG_{383}	—	October 5, 2002	Apache Point	SDSS	·	4.3 km	MPC · JPL
270919	2002 TB_{385}	—	October 5, 2002	Apache Point	SDSS	V	750 m	MPC · JPL
270920	2002 UT	—	October 25, 2002	Wrightwood	J. W. Young	·	1.7 km	MPC · JPL
270921	2002 UC_{10}	—	October 28, 2002	Palomar	NEAT	·	3.0 km	MPC · JPL
270922	2002 UP_{13}	—	October 28, 2002	Haleakala	NEAT	·	5.0 km	MPC · JPL
270923	2002 UA_{16}	—	October 30, 2002	Palomar	NEAT	·	5.7 km	MPC · JPL
270924	2002 UZ_{17}	—	October 30, 2002	Palomar	NEAT	·	5.5 km	MPC · JPL
270925	2002 UC_{28}	—	October 30, 2002	Palomar	NEAT	·	860 m	MPC · JPL
270926	2002 UG_{30}	—	October 30, 2002	Kitt Peak	Spacewatch	·	890 m	MPC · JPL
270927	2002 US_{31}	—	October 30, 2002	Haleakala	NEAT	·	4.4 km	MPC · JPL
270928	2002 UD_{37}	—	October 31, 2002	Palomar	NEAT	·	1.1 km	MPC · JPL
270929	2002 UQ_{39}	—	October 31, 2002	Palomar	NEAT	·	3.2 km	MPC · JPL
270930	2002 UW_{43}	—	October 30, 2002	Kitt Peak	Spacewatch	·	3.1 km	MPC · JPL
270931	2002 UB_{52}	—	October 29, 2002	Apache Point	SDSS	·	4.0 km	MPC · JPL
270932	2002 UQ_{56}	—	October 29, 2002	Apache Point	SDSS	·	1.5 km	MPC · JPL
270933	2002 UK_{60}	—	October 29, 2002	Apache Point	SDSS	·	2.8 km	MPC · JPL
270934	2002 UX_{61}	—	October 30, 2002	Apache Point	SDSS	·	5.1 km	MPC · JPL
270935	2002 UP_{64}	—	October 30, 2002	Apache Point	SDSS	·	3.8 km	MPC · JPL
270936	2002 UE_{70}	—	October 30, 2002	Palomar	NEAT	·	1.0 km	MPC · JPL
270937	2002 UR_{70}	—	October 30, 2002	Apache Point	SDSS	V	790 m	MPC · JPL
270938	2002 US_{70}	—	October 30, 2002	Apache Point	SDSS	·	2.0 km	MPC · JPL
270939	2002 UG_{71}	—	October 29, 2002	Palomar	NEAT	·	7.5 km	MPC · JPL
270940	2002 VS_{4}	—	November 4, 2002	Palomar	NEAT	·	1.5 km	MPC · JPL
270941	2002 VR_{5}	—	November 2, 2002	La Palma	La Palma	·	790 m	MPC · JPL
270942	2002 VA_{17}	—	November 5, 2002	Socorro	LINEAR	·	1.2 km	MPC · JPL
270943	2002 VV_{18}	—	November 4, 2002	Anderson Mesa	LONEOS	MAS	860 m	MPC · JPL
270944	2002 VT_{36}	—	November 5, 2002	Socorro	LINEAR	·	1.7 km	MPC · JPL
270945	2002 VV_{38}	—	November 5, 2002	Socorro	LINEAR	·	1.6 km	MPC · JPL
270946	2002 VK_{42}	—	November 5, 2002	Palomar	NEAT	MAS	730 m	MPC · JPL
270947	2002 VJ_{44}	—	November 4, 2002	Haleakala	NEAT	·	910 m	MPC · JPL
270948	2002 VU_{45}	—	November 5, 2002	Socorro	LINEAR	MAS	720 m	MPC · JPL
270949	2002 VS_{51}	—	November 6, 2002	Anderson Mesa	LONEOS	·	2.9 km	MPC · JPL
270950	2002 VY_{53}	—	November 6, 2002	Socorro	LINEAR	·	910 m	MPC · JPL
270951	2002 VL_{56}	—	November 6, 2002	Anderson Mesa	LONEOS	·	1.5 km	MPC · JPL
270952	2002 VG_{62}	—	November 5, 2002	Socorro	LINEAR	·	1.1 km	MPC · JPL
270953	2002 VZ_{62}	—	November 6, 2002	Socorro	LINEAR	·	970 m	MPC · JPL
270954	2002 VQ_{63}	—	November 6, 2002	Anderson Mesa	LONEOS	·	4.9 km	MPC · JPL
270955	2002 VT_{70}	—	November 7, 2002	Socorro	LINEAR	·	4.4 km	MPC · JPL
270956	2002 VP_{71}	—	November 7, 2002	Socorro	LINEAR	(2076)	1.1 km	MPC · JPL
270957	2002 VN_{72}	—	November 7, 2002	Socorro	LINEAR	·	980 m	MPC · JPL
270958	2002 VU_{76}	—	November 7, 2002	Socorro	LINEAR	NYS	1.3 km	MPC · JPL
270959	2002 VJ_{78}	—	November 7, 2002	Socorro	LINEAR	HNS	2.4 km	MPC · JPL
270960	2002 VK_{81}	—	November 7, 2002	Socorro	LINEAR	·	1.3 km	MPC · JPL
270961	2002 VH_{86}	—	November 8, 2002	Socorro	LINEAR	·	3.8 km	MPC · JPL
270962	2002 VF_{93}	—	November 11, 2002	Socorro	LINEAR	NYS	1.7 km	MPC · JPL
270963	2002 VO_{95}	—	November 11, 2002	Socorro	LINEAR	·	950 m	MPC · JPL
270964	2002 VX_{96}	—	November 12, 2002	Anderson Mesa	LONEOS	·	1.6 km	MPC · JPL
270965	2002 VJ_{97}	—	November 12, 2002	Socorro	LINEAR	V	790 m	MPC · JPL
270966	2002 VL_{100}	—	November 11, 2002	Anderson Mesa	LONEOS	·	1.6 km	MPC · JPL
270967	2002 VV_{101}	—	November 11, 2002	Socorro	LINEAR	·	1.3 km	MPC · JPL
270968	2002 VU_{102}	—	November 12, 2002	Socorro	LINEAR	NYS	1.2 km	MPC · JPL
270969	2002 VK_{104}	—	November 12, 2002	Socorro	LINEAR	·	4.6 km	MPC · JPL
270970	2002 VS_{104}	—	November 12, 2002	Socorro	LINEAR	·	1.3 km	MPC · JPL
270971	2002 VW_{106}	—	November 12, 2002	Socorro	LINEAR	V	720 m	MPC · JPL
270972	2002 VM_{107}	—	November 12, 2002	Socorro	LINEAR	·	1.5 km	MPC · JPL
270973	2002 VL_{116}	—	November 12, 2002	Palomar	NEAT	·	4.1 km	MPC · JPL
270974	2002 VB_{129}	—	November 5, 2002	Socorro	LINEAR	·	2.0 km	MPC · JPL
270975	2002 VW_{133}	—	November 6, 2002	Anderson Mesa	LONEOS	·	1.2 km	MPC · JPL
270976	2002 VV_{141}	—	November 12, 2002	Palomar	NEAT	MAS	730 m	MPC · JPL
270977	2002 VC_{142}	—	November 13, 2002	Palomar	NEAT	·	5.0 km	MPC · JPL
270978	2002 VN_{144}	—	November 4, 2002	Palomar	NEAT	THM	3.4 km	MPC · JPL
270979	2002 VP_{146}	—	November 11, 2002	Palomar	NEAT	NYS	1.3 km	MPC · JPL
270980	2002 WJ_{11}	—	November 25, 2002	Emerald Lane	L. Ball	·	1.4 km	MPC · JPL
270981	2002 WN_{11}	—	November 28, 2002	Eskridge	G. Hug	V	760 m	MPC · JPL
270982	2002 WS_{19}	—	November 25, 2002	Palomar	S. F. Hönig	·	1.4 km	MPC · JPL
270983	2002 WO_{26}	—	November 24, 2002	Palomar	NEAT	·	1.2 km	MPC · JPL
270984 Dikschmidt	2002 WF_{28}	Dikschmidt	November 24, 2002	Palomar	NEAT	·	1.0 km	MPC · JPL
270985	2002 WD_{29}	—	November 22, 2002	Palomar	NEAT	·	1.1 km	MPC · JPL
270986	2002 XA_{5}	—	December 1, 2002	Socorro	LINEAR	H	670 m	MPC · JPL
270987	2002 XW_{6}	—	December 1, 2002	Haleakala	NEAT	·	2.2 km	MPC · JPL
270988	2002 XC_{16}	—	December 3, 2002	Palomar	NEAT	·	4.1 km	MPC · JPL
270989	2002 XT_{17}	—	December 5, 2002	Socorro	LINEAR	MAS	850 m	MPC · JPL
270990	2002 XW_{22}	—	December 3, 2002	Palomar	NEAT	·	1.4 km	MPC · JPL
270991	2002 XU_{25}	—	December 5, 2002	Socorro	LINEAR	·	1.6 km	MPC · JPL
270992	2002 XA_{28}	—	December 5, 2002	Socorro	LINEAR	·	1.7 km	MPC · JPL
270993	2002 XQ_{37}	—	December 6, 2002	Socorro	LINEAR	·	1.7 km	MPC · JPL
270994	2002 XV_{39}	—	December 9, 2002	Uccle	T. Pauwels	MAS	820 m	MPC · JPL
270995	2002 XP_{47}	—	December 10, 2002	Socorro	LINEAR	H	690 m	MPC · JPL
270996	2002 XX_{57}	—	December 11, 2002	Socorro	LINEAR	·	1.5 km	MPC · JPL
270997	2002 XQ_{60}	—	December 10, 2002	Socorro	LINEAR	·	2.5 km	MPC · JPL
270998	2002 XQ_{62}	—	December 11, 2002	Socorro	LINEAR	H	630 m	MPC · JPL
270999	2002 XY_{65}	—	December 12, 2002	Socorro	LINEAR	T_{j} (2.99)	5.0 km	MPC · JPL
271000	2002 XK_{73}	—	December 11, 2002	Socorro	LINEAR	·	2.0 km	MPC · JPL

back to top

== See also ==
- Meanings of minor-planet names: 270001–271000
