= Meanings of minor-planet names: 269001–270000 =

As minor planet discoveries are confirmed, they are given a permanent number by the IAU's Minor Planet Center (MPC), and the discoverers can then submit names for them, following the IAU's naming conventions. The list below concerns those minor planets in the specified number-range that have received names, and explains the meanings of those names.

Official naming citations of newly named small Solar System bodies are approved and published in a bulletin by IAU's Working Group for Small Bodies Nomenclature (WGSBN). Before May 2021, citations were published in MPC's Minor Planet Circulars for many decades. Recent citations can also be found on the JPL Small-Body Database (SBDB). Until his death in 2016, German astronomer Lutz D. Schmadel compiled these citations into the Dictionary of Minor Planet Names (DMP) and regularly updated the collection.

Based on Paul Herget's The Names of the Minor Planets, Schmadel also researched the unclear origin of numerous asteroids, most of which had been named prior to World War II. This article incorporates text from this source, which is in the public domain: SBDB New namings may only be added to this list below after official publication as the preannouncement of names is condemned. The WGSBN publishes a comprehensive guideline for the naming rules of non-cometary small Solar System bodies.

== 269001–269100 ==
Named minor planet	Provisional	This minor planet was named for...	Ref · Catalog
There are no named minor planets in this number range

== 269101–269200 ==
back to top

Named minor planet	Provisional	This minor planet was named for...	Ref · Catalog
There are no named minor planets in this number range

== 269201–269300 ==
back to top

Named minor planet	Provisional	This minor planet was named for...	Ref · Catalog
269232 Tahin	2008 QV	Szilvia Tahin (born 1975), wife of Hungarian discoverer Krisztián Sárneczky	JPL · 269232
269243 Charbonnel	2008 QN_{14}	Stéphane Charbonnel (born 1973), a French amateur astronomer and professor of Physics	JPL · 269243
269245 Catastini	2008 QL_{19}	Mario Catastini (born 1932), a retired Italian elementary-school teacher	JPL · 269245
269251 Kolomna	2008 QW_{28}	Kolomna, one of the oldest cities in the Moscow region, founded around AD 1140	JPL · 269251
269252 Bogdanstupka	2008 QA_{29}	Bohdan Stupka (1941–2012), a Ukrainian actor and received many international awards.	JPL · 269252
269300 Diego	2008 SB_{82}	Diego Rodriguez, a Spanish astrophotographer and co-founder of the M1 group of variable-star observers	JPL · 269300

== 269301–269400 ==
back to top

Named minor planet	Provisional	This minor planet was named for...	Ref · Catalog
269323 Madisonvillehigh	2008 SE_{209}	Madisonville High School, Texas, is a long-time participant in the IASC minor planet search campaigns.	JPL · 269323
269390 Igortkachenko	2009 QA_{34}	Igor Tkachenko (1964–2009), a Russian military pilot and posthumous Hero of the Russian Federation	JPL · 269390

== 269401–269500 ==
back to top

Named minor planet	Provisional	This minor planet was named for...	Ref · Catalog
269484 Marcia	2009 UB_{4}	Marcia de Queiroz, the daughter of Portuguese-Swiss discoverer José De Queiroz	JPL · 269484
269485 Bisikalo	2009 UQ_{14}	Dmitry V. Bisikalo (born 1961), a specialist in interacting binary stars and numerical astrophysics, and deputy director of the Institute of Astronomy of the Russian Academy of Sciences	JPL · 269485

== 269501–269600 ==
back to top

Named minor planet	Provisional	This minor planet was named for...	Ref · Catalog
269548 Fratyu	2009 WR	Fratyu Popov (1846–1903) was a Bulgarian public figure, revolutionary, teacher and judge. He came from an old family in Sopot and participated in the establishment of the Sopot Revolutionary Committee (1869). He was the prototype of the teacher Fratyu from the novel Under the Yoke by Ivan Vazov.	IAU · 269548
269550 Chur	2009 WT_{5}	Chur, the oldest town in Switzerland	JPL · 269550
269567 Bakhtinov	2009 WK_{105}	Pavel Ivanovich Bakhtinov (born 1963), a radio engineer, amateur astronomer and well-known astrophotographer.	JPL · 269567
269589 Kryachko	2009 XN_{1}	Timur Valer'evič Krjačko (born 1970) an amateur astronomer and an observer of comets and discoverer of minor planets	JPL · 269589

== 269601–269700 ==
back to top

Named minor planet	Provisional	This minor planet was named for...	Ref · Catalog
There are no named minor planets in this number range

== 269701–269800 ==
back to top

Named minor planet	Provisional	This minor planet was named for...	Ref · Catalog
269742 Kroónorbert	1998 UH_{23}	Norbert Kroó (born 1934), a renowned researcher of solid state physics, optics, laser physics and neutron physics and a member of the Hungarian Academy of Sciences	JPL · 269742
269762 Nocentini	1999 TN_{4}	Francesca Nocentini (born 1975), a friend of Italian discoverer Gianluca Masi	JPL · 269762

== 269801–269900 ==
back to top

Named minor planet	Provisional	This minor planet was named for...	Ref · Catalog
There are no named minor planets in this number range

== 269901–270000 ==
back to top

Named minor planet	Provisional	This minor planet was named for...	Ref · Catalog
There are no named minor planets in this number range

back to top

Preceded by 268,001–269,000	Meanings of minor-planet names List of minor planets: 269,001–270,000	Succeeded by 270,001–271,000
