= List of minor planets: 269001–270000 =

The following is a partial list of minor planets, running from minor-planet number 269001 through 270000, inclusive. The primary data for this and other partial lists is based on JPL's "Small-Body Orbital Elements" and data available from the Minor Planet Center. Critical list information is also provided by the MPC, unless otherwise specified from Lowell Observatory. A detailed description of the table's columns and additional sources are given on the main page including a complete list of every page in this series, and a statistical break-up on the dynamical classification of minor planets.

Also see the summary list of all named bodies in numerical and alphabetical order, and the corresponding naming citations for the number range of this particular list. New namings may only be added to this list after official publication, as the preannouncement of names is condemned by the Working Group for Small Bodies Nomenclature of the International Astronomical Union.

Near-Earth obj.	MBA (inner)	MBA (outer)	Centaur
Mars-crosser	MBA (middle)	Jupiter trojan	Trans-Neptunian obj.
Unclassified

== 269001–269100 ==
Designation			Discovery			Properties		Ref
Permanent	Provisional	Named after	Date	Site	Discoverer(s)	Category	Diam.	Ref
269001	2007 EQ_{115}	—	March 13, 2007	Mount Lemmon	Mount Lemmon Survey	·	3.1 km	MPC · JPL
269002	2007 EP_{116}	—	March 13, 2007	Mount Lemmon	Mount Lemmon Survey	·	2.7 km	MPC · JPL
269003	2007 EX_{118}	—	March 13, 2007	Mount Lemmon	Mount Lemmon Survey	·	2.8 km	MPC · JPL
269004	2007 EO_{119}	—	March 13, 2007	Mount Lemmon	Mount Lemmon Survey	·	2.3 km	MPC · JPL
269005	2007 EP_{125}	—	March 13, 2007	Mount Nyukasa	Japan Aerospace Exploration Agency	·	1.5 km	MPC · JPL
269006	2007 EV_{128}	—	March 9, 2007	Mount Lemmon	Mount Lemmon Survey	·	1.1 km	MPC · JPL
269007	2007 EX_{130}	—	March 9, 2007	Mount Lemmon	Mount Lemmon Survey	(5)	1.1 km	MPC · JPL
269008	2007 EM_{136}	—	March 10, 2007	Kitt Peak	Spacewatch	·	1.5 km	MPC · JPL
269009	2007 EN_{137}	—	March 11, 2007	Kitt Peak	Spacewatch	NYS	1.6 km	MPC · JPL
269010	2007 EU_{137}	—	March 11, 2007	Kitt Peak	Spacewatch	·	2.6 km	MPC · JPL
269011	2007 EU_{138}	—	March 12, 2007	Kitt Peak	Spacewatch	NYS	1.6 km	MPC · JPL
269012	2007 ET_{169}	—	March 13, 2007	Kitt Peak	Spacewatch	·	2.4 km	MPC · JPL
269013	2007 EW_{180}	—	March 14, 2007	Kitt Peak	Spacewatch	·	2.1 km	MPC · JPL
269014	2007 EX_{182}	—	March 15, 2007	Catalina	CSS	·	1.6 km	MPC · JPL
269015	2007 EG_{199}	—	March 10, 2007	Catalina	CSS	·	2.6 km	MPC · JPL
269016	2007 EQ_{200}	—	March 14, 2007	Mount Lemmon	Mount Lemmon Survey	·	2.1 km	MPC · JPL
269017	2007 EL_{205}	—	March 11, 2007	Kitt Peak	Spacewatch	·	4.7 km	MPC · JPL
269018	2007 EX_{207}	—	March 14, 2007	Kitt Peak	Spacewatch	·	1.7 km	MPC · JPL
269019	2007 EU_{209}	—	March 15, 2007	Mount Lemmon	Mount Lemmon Survey	·	3.6 km	MPC · JPL
269020	2007 EM_{213}	—	March 12, 2007	Kitt Peak	Spacewatch	·	1.5 km	MPC · JPL
269021	2007 EQ_{213}	—	March 9, 2007	Kitt Peak	Spacewatch	·	1.7 km	MPC · JPL
269022	2007 EU_{213}	—	March 10, 2007	Mount Lemmon	Mount Lemmon Survey	·	1.3 km	MPC · JPL
269023	2007 EF_{219}	—	March 13, 2007	Mount Lemmon	Mount Lemmon Survey	·	1.3 km	MPC · JPL
269024	2007 EW_{219}	—	March 10, 2007	Mount Lemmon	Mount Lemmon Survey	·	2.3 km	MPC · JPL
269025	2007 ER_{222}	—	March 14, 2007	Catalina	CSS	·	2.6 km	MPC · JPL
269026	2007 FN_{2}	—	March 16, 2007	Catalina	CSS	·	1.9 km	MPC · JPL
269027	2007 FP_{4}	—	March 18, 2007	Kitt Peak	Spacewatch	·	1.8 km	MPC · JPL
269028	2007 FH_{7}	—	March 16, 2007	Mount Lemmon	Mount Lemmon Survey	JUN	1.1 km	MPC · JPL
269029	2007 FZ_{9}	—	March 16, 2007	Socorro	LINEAR	·	2.7 km	MPC · JPL
269030	2007 FN_{10}	—	March 16, 2007	Kitt Peak	Spacewatch	·	3.2 km	MPC · JPL
269031	2007 FM_{11}	—	March 16, 2007	Kitt Peak	Spacewatch	·	1.5 km	MPC · JPL
269032	2007 FL_{15}	—	March 17, 2007	Anderson Mesa	LONEOS	RAF	1.2 km	MPC · JPL
269033	2007 FK_{23}	—	March 20, 2007	Kitt Peak	Spacewatch	·	2.0 km	MPC · JPL
269034	2007 FP_{26}	—	March 20, 2007	Kitt Peak	Spacewatch	·	1.3 km	MPC · JPL
269035	2007 FP_{29}	—	March 20, 2007	Mount Lemmon	Mount Lemmon Survey	·	1.3 km	MPC · JPL
269036	2007 FN_{30}	—	March 20, 2007	Mount Lemmon	Mount Lemmon Survey	·	1.7 km	MPC · JPL
269037	2007 FN_{31}	—	March 20, 2007	Kitt Peak	Spacewatch	·	3.2 km	MPC · JPL
269038	2007 FH_{32}	—	March 20, 2007	Anderson Mesa	LONEOS	·	2.9 km	MPC · JPL
269039	2007 FJ_{32}	—	March 20, 2007	Kitt Peak	Spacewatch	·	3.0 km	MPC · JPL
269040	2007 FO_{32}	—	March 20, 2007	Kitt Peak	Spacewatch	·	2.1 km	MPC · JPL
269041	2007 FW_{32}	—	March 20, 2007	Kitt Peak	Spacewatch	·	1.9 km	MPC · JPL
269042	2007 FC_{33}	—	March 20, 2007	Kitt Peak	Spacewatch	·	2.5 km	MPC · JPL
269043	2007 FG_{33}	—	March 21, 2007	Socorro	LINEAR	·	2.3 km	MPC · JPL
269044	2007 FG_{36}	—	March 26, 2007	Mount Lemmon	Mount Lemmon Survey	WIT	1.2 km	MPC · JPL
269045	2007 FF_{38}	—	March 27, 2007	Siding Spring	SSS	·	3.6 km	MPC · JPL
269046	2007 FQ_{38}	—	March 25, 2007	Mount Lemmon	Mount Lemmon Survey	·	3.2 km	MPC · JPL
269047	2007 FH_{43}	—	March 27, 2007	Siding Spring	SSS	·	2.0 km	MPC · JPL
269048	2007 FU_{43}	—	March 18, 2007	Kitt Peak	Spacewatch	·	2.6 km	MPC · JPL
269049	2007 FR_{49}	—	March 20, 2007	Catalina	CSS	·	3.1 km	MPC · JPL
269050	2007 GJ_{12}	—	April 11, 2007	Mount Lemmon	Mount Lemmon Survey	·	1.6 km	MPC · JPL
269051	2007 GJ_{16}	—	April 11, 2007	Kitt Peak	Spacewatch	EOS	2.9 km	MPC · JPL
269052	2007 GU_{18}	—	April 11, 2007	Kitt Peak	Spacewatch	EUN	1.5 km	MPC · JPL
269053	2007 GT_{19}	—	April 11, 2007	Kitt Peak	Spacewatch	·	2.8 km	MPC · JPL
269054	2007 GW_{20}	—	April 11, 2007	Mount Lemmon	Mount Lemmon Survey	·	2.5 km	MPC · JPL
269055	2007 GZ_{23}	—	April 11, 2007	Kitt Peak	Spacewatch	·	1.6 km	MPC · JPL
269056	2007 GS_{24}	—	April 11, 2007	Kitt Peak	Spacewatch	RAF	1.7 km	MPC · JPL
269057	2007 GW_{24}	—	April 11, 2007	Siding Spring	SSS	·	2.9 km	MPC · JPL
269058	2007 GO_{29}	—	April 11, 2007	Siding Spring	SSS	·	3.2 km	MPC · JPL
269059	2007 GU_{30}	—	April 14, 2007	Mount Lemmon	Mount Lemmon Survey	AGN	1.3 km	MPC · JPL
269060	2007 GZ_{32}	—	April 11, 2007	Mount Lemmon	Mount Lemmon Survey	·	1.7 km	MPC · JPL
269061	2007 GF_{33}	—	April 11, 2007	Catalina	CSS	·	2.8 km	MPC · JPL
269062	2007 GW_{33}	—	April 11, 2007	Kitt Peak	Spacewatch	GEF	1.4 km	MPC · JPL
269063	2007 GV_{39}	—	April 14, 2007	Kitt Peak	Spacewatch	·	2.1 km	MPC · JPL
269064	2007 GB_{40}	—	April 14, 2007	Kitt Peak	Spacewatch	AGN	1.4 km	MPC · JPL
269065	2007 GB_{41}	—	April 14, 2007	Kitt Peak	Spacewatch	AGN	1.6 km	MPC · JPL
269066	2007 GJ_{44}	—	April 14, 2007	Mount Lemmon	Mount Lemmon Survey	·	1.8 km	MPC · JPL
269067	2007 GQ_{44}	—	April 14, 2007	Kitt Peak	Spacewatch	·	3.3 km	MPC · JPL
269068	2007 GD_{46}	—	April 14, 2007	Kitt Peak	Spacewatch	·	1.7 km	MPC · JPL
269069	2007 GT_{46}	—	April 14, 2007	Kitt Peak	Spacewatch	·	3.0 km	MPC · JPL
269070	2007 GR_{48}	—	April 14, 2007	Kitt Peak	Spacewatch	·	1.6 km	MPC · JPL
269071	2007 GZ_{48}	—	April 14, 2007	Kitt Peak	Spacewatch	·	1.6 km	MPC · JPL
269072	2007 GF_{51}	—	April 15, 2007	Catalina	CSS	·	1.6 km	MPC · JPL
269073	2007 GP_{61}	—	April 15, 2007	Kitt Peak	Spacewatch	·	1.4 km	MPC · JPL
269074	2007 GW_{62}	—	April 15, 2007	Kitt Peak	Spacewatch	·	1.8 km	MPC · JPL
269075	2007 GL_{67}	—	April 15, 2007	Kitt Peak	Spacewatch	AGN	1.7 km	MPC · JPL
269076	2007 GF_{68}	—	April 14, 2007	Kitt Peak	Spacewatch	·	2.5 km	MPC · JPL
269077	2007 GH_{73}	—	April 15, 2007	Kitt Peak	Spacewatch	·	2.8 km	MPC · JPL
269078	2007 GT_{73}	—	April 15, 2007	Kitt Peak	Spacewatch	·	1.5 km	MPC · JPL
269079	2007 HK_{6}	—	April 16, 2007	Catalina	CSS	·	4.7 km	MPC · JPL
269080	2007 HF_{7}	—	April 16, 2007	Catalina	CSS	·	3.1 km	MPC · JPL
269081	2007 HR_{11}	—	April 18, 2007	Mount Lemmon	Mount Lemmon Survey	HOF	2.8 km	MPC · JPL
269082	2007 HG_{13}	—	April 16, 2007	Catalina	CSS	·	1.9 km	MPC · JPL
269083	2007 HB_{16}	—	April 18, 2007	Lulin	LUSS	·	2.0 km	MPC · JPL
269084	2007 HE_{17}	—	April 16, 2007	Anderson Mesa	LONEOS	LEO	2.6 km	MPC · JPL
269085	2007 HW_{26}	—	April 18, 2007	Kitt Peak	Spacewatch	·	2.0 km	MPC · JPL
269086	2007 HA_{30}	—	April 19, 2007	Mount Lemmon	Mount Lemmon Survey	·	1.7 km	MPC · JPL
269087	2007 HZ_{31}	—	April 19, 2007	Mount Lemmon	Mount Lemmon Survey	·	1.8 km	MPC · JPL
269088	2007 HQ_{36}	—	April 19, 2007	Kitt Peak	Spacewatch	·	1.7 km	MPC · JPL
269089	2007 HX_{38}	—	April 20, 2007	Mount Lemmon	Mount Lemmon Survey	·	1.7 km	MPC · JPL
269090	2007 HA_{41}	—	April 20, 2007	Socorro	LINEAR	·	3.4 km	MPC · JPL
269091	2007 HG_{46}	—	April 20, 2007	Anderson Mesa	LONEOS	·	2.9 km	MPC · JPL
269092	2007 HK_{48}	—	April 20, 2007	Kitt Peak	Spacewatch	·	1.5 km	MPC · JPL
269093	2007 HJ_{53}	—	April 20, 2007	Kitt Peak	Spacewatch	·	2.0 km	MPC · JPL
269094	2007 HV_{57}	—	April 23, 2007	Kitt Peak	Spacewatch	·	2.3 km	MPC · JPL
269095	2007 HP_{61}	—	April 22, 2007	Catalina	CSS	·	2.6 km	MPC · JPL
269096	2007 HN_{65}	—	April 22, 2007	Catalina	CSS	·	2.2 km	MPC · JPL
269097	2007 HV_{65}	—	April 22, 2007	Mount Lemmon	Mount Lemmon Survey	·	2.9 km	MPC · JPL
269098	2007 HB_{66}	—	April 22, 2007	Catalina	CSS	·	6.1 km	MPC · JPL
269099	2007 HM_{79}	—	April 23, 2007	Mount Lemmon	Mount Lemmon Survey	·	2.1 km	MPC · JPL
269100	2007 HC_{80}	—	April 24, 2007	Kitt Peak	Spacewatch	·	1.7 km	MPC · JPL

== 269101–269200 ==
back to top

Designation			Discovery			Properties		Ref
Permanent	Provisional	Named after	Date	Site	Discoverer(s)	Category	Diam.	Ref
269101	2007 HB_{83}	—	April 22, 2007	Catalina	CSS	HNS	1.7 km	MPC · JPL
269102	2007 HE_{83}	—	April 23, 2007	Kitt Peak	Spacewatch	·	3.1 km	MPC · JPL
269103	2007 HM_{83}	—	April 23, 2007	Kitt Peak	Spacewatch	·	2.7 km	MPC · JPL
269104	2007 HN_{86}	—	April 24, 2007	Kitt Peak	Spacewatch	·	2.7 km	MPC · JPL
269105	2007 HF_{90}	—	April 19, 2007	Anderson Mesa	LONEOS	·	3.1 km	MPC · JPL
269106	2007 HP_{97}	—	April 19, 2007	Mount Lemmon	Mount Lemmon Survey	DOR	2.9 km	MPC · JPL
269107	2007 JO_{3}	—	May 6, 2007	Kitt Peak	Spacewatch	·	2.3 km	MPC · JPL
269108	2007 JB_{9}	—	May 9, 2007	Mount Lemmon	Mount Lemmon Survey	·	2.6 km	MPC · JPL
269109	2007 JS_{25}	—	May 9, 2007	Kitt Peak	Spacewatch	DOR	2.5 km	MPC · JPL
269110	2007 JG_{27}	—	May 9, 2007	Kitt Peak	Spacewatch	(13314)	2.4 km	MPC · JPL
269111	2007 JR_{37}	—	May 12, 2007	Mount Lemmon	Mount Lemmon Survey	·	1.9 km	MPC · JPL
269112	2007 JZ_{37}	—	May 12, 2007	Mount Lemmon	Mount Lemmon Survey	(13314)	2.2 km	MPC · JPL
269113	2007 JA_{38}	—	May 12, 2007	Mount Lemmon	Mount Lemmon Survey	NEM	3.2 km	MPC · JPL
269114	2007 JL_{39}	—	May 15, 2007	Kitt Peak	Spacewatch	·	2.3 km	MPC · JPL
269115	2007 JT_{39}	—	May 11, 2007	Siding Spring	SSS	·	2.6 km	MPC · JPL
269116	2007 KO_{8}	—	May 24, 2007	Catalina	CSS	·	3.4 km	MPC · JPL
269117	2007 LU_{11}	—	June 9, 2007	Kitt Peak	Spacewatch	·	2.6 km	MPC · JPL
269118	2007 LH_{15}	—	June 12, 2007	Reedy Creek	J. Broughton	·	2.6 km	MPC · JPL
269119	2007 LQ_{31}	—	June 15, 2007	Kitt Peak	Spacewatch	·	3.6 km	MPC · JPL
269120	2007 LM_{33}	—	June 12, 2007	Catalina	CSS	·	6.7 km	MPC · JPL
269121	2007 MG_{9}	—	June 19, 2007	Kitt Peak	Spacewatch	·	4.2 km	MPC · JPL
269122	2007 MD_{25}	—	June 23, 2007	Kitt Peak	Spacewatch	·	2.2 km	MPC · JPL
269123	2007 NF_{2}	—	July 12, 2007	Mayhill	Lowe, A.	·	2.6 km	MPC · JPL
269124	2007 PC_{23}	—	August 11, 2007	Anderson Mesa	LONEOS	CYB	6.6 km	MPC · JPL
269125	2007 PF_{37}	—	August 13, 2007	Socorro	LINEAR	·	4.4 km	MPC · JPL
269126	2007 PP_{43}	—	August 11, 2007	Bergisch Gladbach	W. Bickel	·	4.3 km	MPC · JPL
269127	2007 PU_{47}	—	August 8, 2007	Socorro	LINEAR	·	3.6 km	MPC · JPL
269128	2007 PU_{48}	—	August 13, 2007	Siding Spring	SSS	BRA	2.3 km	MPC · JPL
269129	2007 RG_{22}	—	September 3, 2007	Catalina	CSS	V	770 m	MPC · JPL
269130	2007 RL_{65}	—	September 10, 2007	Mount Lemmon	Mount Lemmon Survey	·	3.0 km	MPC · JPL
269131	2007 RL_{108}	—	September 11, 2007	Kitt Peak	Spacewatch	·	3.0 km	MPC · JPL
269132	2007 RZ_{133}	—	September 11, 2007	Catalina	CSS	H	830 m	MPC · JPL
269133	2007 SP_{3}	—	September 16, 2007	Socorro	LINEAR	·	4.0 km	MPC · JPL
269134	2007 TF_{89}	—	October 8, 2007	Mount Lemmon	Mount Lemmon Survey	·	3.2 km	MPC · JPL
269135	2007 TL_{92}	—	October 5, 2007	Kitt Peak	Spacewatch	·	2.8 km	MPC · JPL
269136	2007 TF_{161}	—	October 11, 2007	Socorro	LINEAR	·	5.4 km	MPC · JPL
269137	2007 TM_{177}	—	October 6, 2007	Kitt Peak	Spacewatch	LIX	4.1 km	MPC · JPL
269138	2007 TM_{225}	—	October 5, 2007	Kitt Peak	Spacewatch	THM	3.1 km	MPC · JPL
269139	2007 TJ_{284}	—	October 9, 2007	Anderson Mesa	LONEOS	CYB	6.9 km	MPC · JPL
269140	2007 UA_{21}	—	October 16, 2007	Kitt Peak	Spacewatch	LIX	4.6 km	MPC · JPL
269141	2007 UT_{60}	—	October 30, 2007	Mount Lemmon	Mount Lemmon Survey	·	3.8 km	MPC · JPL
269142	2007 VY_{30}	—	November 2, 2007	Kitt Peak	Spacewatch	·	750 m	MPC · JPL
269143	2007 WZ_{23}	—	November 18, 2007	Mount Lemmon	Mount Lemmon Survey	·	4.3 km	MPC · JPL
269144	2008 AR_{31}	—	January 10, 2008	Catalina	CSS	H	940 m	MPC · JPL
269145	2008 CZ_{31}	—	February 2, 2008	Kitt Peak	Spacewatch	·	720 m	MPC · JPL
269146	2008 CE_{204}	—	February 9, 2008	Mount Lemmon	Mount Lemmon Survey	·	1.5 km	MPC · JPL
269147	2008 DU_{4}	—	February 27, 2008	Calvin-Rehoboth	Calvin College	·	950 m	MPC · JPL
269148	2008 EL_{15}	—	October 2, 2003	Kitt Peak	Spacewatch	·	650 m	MPC · JPL
269149	2008 EV_{18}	—	March 2, 2008	Catalina	CSS	·	1.2 km	MPC · JPL
269150	2008 ET_{21}	—	March 2, 2008	Kitt Peak	Spacewatch	·	940 m	MPC · JPL
269151	2008 EW_{28}	—	March 4, 2008	Mount Lemmon	Mount Lemmon Survey	·	730 m	MPC · JPL
269152	2008 EM_{33}	—	March 1, 2008	Kitt Peak	Spacewatch	·	920 m	MPC · JPL
269153	2008 ES_{54}	—	March 6, 2008	Kitt Peak	Spacewatch	·	750 m	MPC · JPL
269154	2008 EM_{67}	—	March 9, 2008	Mount Lemmon	Mount Lemmon Survey	·	830 m	MPC · JPL
269155	2008 EC_{77}	—	March 7, 2008	Kitt Peak	Spacewatch	·	680 m	MPC · JPL
269156	2008 EO_{79}	—	March 8, 2008	Catalina	CSS	·	1.1 km	MPC · JPL
269157	2008 ES_{92}	—	March 3, 2008	Catalina	CSS	PHO	1.2 km	MPC · JPL
269158	2008 EQ_{114}	—	March 8, 2008	Kitt Peak	Spacewatch	·	960 m	MPC · JPL
269159	2008 EZ_{114}	—	March 8, 2008	Kitt Peak	Spacewatch	·	1.0 km	MPC · JPL
269160	2008 EF_{127}	—	March 10, 2008	Kitt Peak	Spacewatch	·	820 m	MPC · JPL
269161	2008 EV_{150}	—	March 4, 2008	Mount Lemmon	Mount Lemmon Survey	NYS	1.4 km	MPC · JPL
269162	2008 ET_{155}	—	March 15, 2008	Mount Lemmon	Mount Lemmon Survey	·	1.1 km	MPC · JPL
269163	2008 EL_{168}	—	March 11, 2008	Kitt Peak	Spacewatch	·	2.0 km	MPC · JPL
269164	2008 FL_{15}	—	March 26, 2008	Kitt Peak	Spacewatch	·	1.0 km	MPC · JPL
269165	2008 FU_{25}	—	March 27, 2008	Kitt Peak	Spacewatch	·	1.2 km	MPC · JPL
269166	2008 FO_{58}	—	March 28, 2008	Mount Lemmon	Mount Lemmon Survey	·	990 m	MPC · JPL
269167	2008 FB_{59}	—	March 29, 2008	Kitt Peak	Spacewatch	·	1.0 km	MPC · JPL
269168	2008 FJ_{59}	—	March 29, 2008	Kitt Peak	Spacewatch	·	2.7 km	MPC · JPL
269169	2008 FM_{59}	—	March 29, 2008	Vail-Jarnac	Jarnac	·	750 m	MPC · JPL
269170	2008 FM_{60}	—	March 10, 2008	Mount Lemmon	Mount Lemmon Survey	·	950 m	MPC · JPL
269171	2008 FS_{60}	—	March 29, 2008	Catalina	CSS	·	1.0 km	MPC · JPL
269172	2008 FK_{61}	—	March 30, 2008	Catalina	CSS	NYS	1.3 km	MPC · JPL
269173	2008 FX_{69}	—	March 28, 2008	Kitt Peak	Spacewatch	·	830 m	MPC · JPL
269174	2008 FY_{75}	—	March 30, 2008	Socorro	LINEAR	(2076)	1.1 km	MPC · JPL
269175	2008 FK_{84}	—	March 28, 2008	Mount Lemmon	Mount Lemmon Survey	·	890 m	MPC · JPL
269176	2008 FF_{93}	—	March 29, 2008	Mount Lemmon	Mount Lemmon Survey	NYS	1.2 km	MPC · JPL
269177	2008 FA_{105}	—	March 30, 2008	Kitt Peak	Spacewatch	·	1.0 km	MPC · JPL
269178	2008 FL_{117}	—	March 31, 2008	Kitt Peak	Spacewatch	·	730 m	MPC · JPL
269179	2008 FD_{125}	—	March 30, 2008	Kitt Peak	Spacewatch	·	810 m	MPC · JPL
269180	2008 FB_{129}	—	March 29, 2008	Kitt Peak	Spacewatch	·	840 m	MPC · JPL
269181	2008 FR_{129}	—	March 31, 2008	Kitt Peak	Spacewatch	·	960 m	MPC · JPL
269182	2008 GO_{11}	—	April 1, 2008	Kitt Peak	Spacewatch	·	1.1 km	MPC · JPL
269183	2008 GJ_{18}	—	April 4, 2008	Mount Lemmon	Mount Lemmon Survey	·	1 km	MPC · JPL
269184	2008 GH_{28}	—	April 3, 2008	Kitt Peak	Spacewatch	·	780 m	MPC · JPL
269185	2008 GZ_{37}	—	April 3, 2008	Kitt Peak	Spacewatch	NYS	990 m	MPC · JPL
269186	2008 GB_{42}	—	April 4, 2008	Kitt Peak	Spacewatch	·	1.4 km	MPC · JPL
269187	2008 GO_{42}	—	April 4, 2008	Kitt Peak	Spacewatch	·	1.2 km	MPC · JPL
269188	2008 GC_{45}	—	April 4, 2008	Kitt Peak	Spacewatch	NYS	1.2 km	MPC · JPL
269189	2008 GZ_{50}	—	April 5, 2008	Mount Lemmon	Mount Lemmon Survey	·	1 km	MPC · JPL
269190	2008 GQ_{66}	—	April 6, 2008	Kitt Peak	Spacewatch	·	980 m	MPC · JPL
269191	2008 GR_{94}	—	April 7, 2008	Mount Lemmon	Mount Lemmon Survey	·	1.2 km	MPC · JPL
269192	2008 GF_{98}	—	April 8, 2008	Kitt Peak	Spacewatch	·	1.4 km	MPC · JPL
269193	2008 GY_{100}	—	April 9, 2008	Kitt Peak	Spacewatch	·	770 m	MPC · JPL
269194	2008 GN_{138}	—	April 15, 2008	Mount Lemmon	Mount Lemmon Survey	V	780 m	MPC · JPL
269195	2008 GP_{140}	—	April 8, 2008	Kitt Peak	Spacewatch	·	780 m	MPC · JPL
269196	2008 GK_{145}	—	April 6, 2008	Kitt Peak	Spacewatch	·	2.0 km	MPC · JPL
269197	2008 HN_{2}	—	April 25, 2008	La Sagra	OAM	·	730 m	MPC · JPL
269198	2008 HZ_{27}	—	April 28, 2008	Kitt Peak	Spacewatch	·	1.4 km	MPC · JPL
269199	2008 HR_{34}	—	April 27, 2008	Kitt Peak	Spacewatch	·	1.0 km	MPC · JPL
269200	2008 HF_{65}	—	April 29, 2008	Mount Lemmon	Mount Lemmon Survey	·	970 m	MPC · JPL

== 269201–269300 ==
back to top

Designation			Discovery			Properties		Ref
Permanent	Provisional	Named after	Date	Site	Discoverer(s)	Category	Diam.	Ref
269201	2008 HD_{68}	—	April 29, 2008	Mount Lemmon	Mount Lemmon Survey	V	650 m	MPC · JPL
269202	2008 JW_{4}	—	May 2, 2008	Catalina	CSS	·	1.1 km	MPC · JPL
269203	2008 JL_{13}	—	May 4, 2008	Mount Lemmon	Mount Lemmon Survey	·	1.1 km	MPC · JPL
269204	2008 JG_{14}	—	May 6, 2008	Mount Lemmon	Mount Lemmon Survey	V	730 m	MPC · JPL
269205	2008 JG_{15}	—	May 5, 2008	Kitt Peak	Spacewatch	·	1.1 km	MPC · JPL
269206	2008 JU_{21}	—	May 5, 2008	Mount Lemmon	Mount Lemmon Survey	·	1.6 km	MPC · JPL
269207	2008 JJ_{37}	—	May 3, 2008	Mount Lemmon	Mount Lemmon Survey	·	870 m	MPC · JPL
269208	2008 KA_{9}	—	May 27, 2008	Kitt Peak	Spacewatch	·	1.2 km	MPC · JPL
269209	2008 KG_{20}	—	May 28, 2008	Kitt Peak	Spacewatch	AEO	2.2 km	MPC · JPL
269210	2008 KU_{21}	—	May 28, 2008	Mount Lemmon	Mount Lemmon Survey	·	2.1 km	MPC · JPL
269211	2008 KA_{31}	—	May 29, 2008	Kitt Peak	Spacewatch	·	1.2 km	MPC · JPL
269212	2008 LK_{6}	—	June 3, 2008	Kitt Peak	Spacewatch	·	1.4 km	MPC · JPL
269213	2008 LL_{10}	—	June 6, 2008	Kitt Peak	Spacewatch	·	860 m	MPC · JPL
269214	2008 LW_{11}	—	June 7, 2008	Kitt Peak	Spacewatch	·	980 m	MPC · JPL
269215	2008 LU_{14}	—	June 8, 2008	Kitt Peak	Spacewatch	·	2.0 km	MPC · JPL
269216	2008 LG_{15}	—	June 9, 2008	Kitt Peak	Spacewatch	PHO	3.4 km	MPC · JPL
269217	2008 ND_{1}	—	July 1, 2008	Eskridge	G. Hug	·	3.4 km	MPC · JPL
269218	2008 NP_{1}	—	July 5, 2008	Pla D'Arguines	R. Ferrando	HNS	1.7 km	MPC · JPL
269219	2008 NK_{2}	—	July 2, 2008	Kitt Peak	Spacewatch	·	1.5 km	MPC · JPL
269220	2008 OE_{11}	—	January 23, 2006	Mount Lemmon	Mount Lemmon Survey	MRX	1.4 km	MPC · JPL
269221	2008 OE_{20}	—	July 30, 2008	Kitt Peak	Spacewatch	·	2.4 km	MPC · JPL
269222	2008 OX_{20}	—	July 29, 2008	Kitt Peak	Spacewatch	·	2.3 km	MPC · JPL
269223	2008 OU_{21}	—	July 30, 2008	Kitt Peak	Spacewatch	KOR	2.1 km	MPC · JPL
269224	2008 OV_{21}	—	July 30, 2008	Kitt Peak	Spacewatch	·	2.6 km	MPC · JPL
269225	2008 OE_{24}	—	July 30, 2008	Kitt Peak	Spacewatch	NYS	1.6 km	MPC · JPL
269226	2008 PO_{4}	—	August 5, 2008	Hibiscus	S. F. Hönig, Teamo, N.	·	3.1 km	MPC · JPL
269227	2008 PG_{9}	—	August 7, 2008	Dauban	Kugel, F.	·	1.8 km	MPC · JPL
269228	2008 PT_{15}	—	August 11, 2008	Pla D'Arguines	R. Ferrando	VER	3.2 km	MPC · JPL
269229	2008 PD_{17}	—	August 11, 2008	La Sagra	OAM	·	5.5 km	MPC · JPL
269230	2008 PP_{19}	—	August 7, 2008	Kitt Peak	Spacewatch	·	1.4 km	MPC · JPL
269231	2008 PQ_{19}	—	August 7, 2008	Kitt Peak	Spacewatch	·	4.8 km	MPC · JPL
269232 Tahin	2008 QV	Tahin	August 21, 2008	Piszkéstető	K. Sárneczky	·	2.6 km	MPC · JPL
269233	2008 QN_{5}	—	August 22, 2008	Kitt Peak	Spacewatch	·	4.8 km	MPC · JPL
269234	2008 QP_{6}	—	August 26, 2008	Prairie Grass	Mahony, J.	·	3.3 km	MPC · JPL
269235	2008 QS_{6}	—	August 21, 2008	Kitt Peak	Spacewatch	GEF	1.9 km	MPC · JPL
269236	2008 QL_{8}	—	August 25, 2008	La Sagra	OAM	·	2.1 km	MPC · JPL
269237	2008 QC_{9}	—	August 25, 2008	La Sagra	OAM	·	4.9 km	MPC · JPL
269238	2008 QM_{9}	—	August 25, 2008	La Sagra	OAM	·	3.8 km	MPC · JPL
269239	2008 QD_{10}	—	August 26, 2008	La Sagra	OAM	·	2.3 km	MPC · JPL
269240	2008 QM_{10}	—	August 26, 2008	La Sagra	OAM	·	4.0 km	MPC · JPL
269241	2008 QY_{10}	—	August 26, 2008	La Sagra	OAM	·	1.4 km	MPC · JPL
269242	2008 QO_{13}	—	August 27, 2008	La Sagra	OAM	·	4.4 km	MPC · JPL
269243 Charbonnel	2008 QN_{14}	Charbonnel	August 27, 2008	Pises	Lopez, J. M., Cavadore, C.	·	3.0 km	MPC · JPL
269244	2008 QJ_{17}	—	August 27, 2008	La Sagra	OAM	·	1.8 km	MPC · JPL
269245 Catastini	2008 QL_{19}	Catastini	August 27, 2008	Andrushivka	Andrushivka	·	3.7 km	MPC · JPL
269246	2008 QF_{20}	—	August 30, 2008	Kleť	Kleť	·	3.1 km	MPC · JPL
269247	2008 QN_{20}	—	August 25, 2008	Socorro	LINEAR	·	3.2 km	MPC · JPL
269248	2008 QL_{23}	—	August 25, 2008	Tiki	Teamo, N.	·	4.3 km	MPC · JPL
269249	2008 QO_{24}	—	August 29, 2008	Pla D'Arguines	R. Ferrando	·	2.2 km	MPC · JPL
269250	2008 QR_{26}	—	August 29, 2008	La Sagra	OAM	·	3.6 km	MPC · JPL
269251 Kolomna	2008 QW_{28}	Kolomna	August 26, 2008	Andrushivka	Andrushivka	JUN	1.6 km	MPC · JPL
269252 Bogdanstupka	2008 QA_{29}	Bogdanstupka	August 27, 2008	Andrushivka	Andrushivka	·	6.2 km	MPC · JPL
269253	2008 QK_{35}	—	August 31, 2008	Moletai	Molėtai	·	2.6 km	MPC · JPL
269254	2008 QN_{36}	—	August 21, 2008	Kitt Peak	Spacewatch	·	2.7 km	MPC · JPL
269255	2008 QP_{36}	—	August 21, 2008	Kitt Peak	Spacewatch	·	1.7 km	MPC · JPL
269256	2008 QK_{43}	—	August 26, 2008	Črni Vrh	Zakrajšek, J.	·	5.6 km	MPC · JPL
269257	2008 RY_{1}	—	September 2, 2008	Kitt Peak	Spacewatch	·	4.0 km	MPC · JPL
269258	2008 RH_{5}	—	September 2, 2008	Kitt Peak	Spacewatch	·	3.0 km	MPC · JPL
269259	2008 RY_{17}	—	September 4, 2008	Kitt Peak	Spacewatch	·	3.4 km	MPC · JPL
269260	2008 RE_{19}	—	September 4, 2008	Kitt Peak	Spacewatch	·	2.6 km	MPC · JPL
269261	2008 RU_{27}	—	September 8, 2008	Grove Creek	Tozzi, F.	·	1.8 km	MPC · JPL
269262	2008 RM_{29}	—	September 2, 2008	Kitt Peak	Spacewatch	·	6.4 km	MPC · JPL
269263	2008 RS_{47}	—	September 2, 2008	La Sagra	OAM	·	2.3 km	MPC · JPL
269264	2008 RY_{50}	—	September 3, 2008	Kitt Peak	Spacewatch	·	4.6 km	MPC · JPL
269265	2008 RO_{58}	—	September 3, 2008	Kitt Peak	Spacewatch	·	4.1 km	MPC · JPL
269266	2008 RL_{63}	—	September 4, 2008	Kitt Peak	Spacewatch	·	2.7 km	MPC · JPL
269267	2008 RO_{65}	—	September 4, 2008	Kitt Peak	Spacewatch	·	3.3 km	MPC · JPL
269268	2008 RP_{69}	—	September 5, 2008	Kitt Peak	Spacewatch	·	2.4 km	MPC · JPL
269269	2008 RN_{70}	—	September 6, 2008	La Sagra	OAM	NYS	1.8 km	MPC · JPL
269270	2008 RW_{71}	—	September 6, 2008	Catalina	CSS	·	2.3 km	MPC · JPL
269271	2008 RF_{72}	—	September 6, 2008	Mount Lemmon	Mount Lemmon Survey	·	1.5 km	MPC · JPL
269272	2008 RJ_{82}	—	September 4, 2008	Kitt Peak	Spacewatch	·	3.0 km	MPC · JPL
269273	2008 RO_{89}	—	September 5, 2008	Kitt Peak	Spacewatch	·	5.0 km	MPC · JPL
269274	2008 RL_{90}	—	September 6, 2008	Catalina	CSS	·	2.3 km	MPC · JPL
269275	2008 RY_{95}	—	September 7, 2008	Catalina	CSS	EOS	2.9 km	MPC · JPL
269276	2008 RB_{102}	—	September 3, 2008	Kitt Peak	Spacewatch	EOS	2.5 km	MPC · JPL
269277	2008 RN_{105}	—	September 6, 2008	Mount Lemmon	Mount Lemmon Survey	·	2.3 km	MPC · JPL
269278	2008 RH_{108}	—	September 9, 2008	Mount Lemmon	Mount Lemmon Survey	CYB	5.5 km	MPC · JPL
269279	2008 RK_{110}	—	September 3, 2008	Kitt Peak	Spacewatch	·	2.3 km	MPC · JPL
269280	2008 RW_{115}	—	September 7, 2008	Mount Lemmon	Mount Lemmon Survey	AGN	1.5 km	MPC · JPL
269281	2008 RO_{117}	—	September 9, 2008	Mount Lemmon	Mount Lemmon Survey	·	2.7 km	MPC · JPL
269282	2008 RN_{121}	—	September 2, 2008	Kitt Peak	Spacewatch	·	2.3 km	MPC · JPL
269283	2008 RN_{136}	—	September 4, 2008	Kitt Peak	Spacewatch	AGN	1.7 km	MPC · JPL
269284	2008 RK_{138}	—	September 6, 2008	Catalina	CSS	·	4.3 km	MPC · JPL
269285	2008 RN_{141}	—	September 6, 2008	Mount Lemmon	Mount Lemmon Survey	KOR	1.8 km	MPC · JPL
269286	2008 SA_{1}	—	September 21, 2008	Grove Creek	Tozzi, F.	·	2.1 km	MPC · JPL
269287	2008 SY_{4}	—	September 22, 2008	Socorro	LINEAR	·	3.8 km	MPC · JPL
269288	2008 SV_{15}	—	September 19, 2008	Kitt Peak	Spacewatch	·	2.4 km	MPC · JPL
269289	2008 SY_{18}	—	September 19, 2008	Kitt Peak	Spacewatch	·	4.2 km	MPC · JPL
269290	2008 SV_{20}	—	September 19, 2008	Kitt Peak	Spacewatch	·	1.2 km	MPC · JPL
269291	2008 SM_{21}	—	September 19, 2008	Kitt Peak	Spacewatch	·	3.6 km	MPC · JPL
269292	2008 SC_{23}	—	September 19, 2008	Kitt Peak	Spacewatch	KOR ·	3.9 km	MPC · JPL
269293	2008 SC_{36}	—	September 20, 2008	Kitt Peak	Spacewatch	·	4.7 km	MPC · JPL
269294	2008 SJ_{37}	—	September 20, 2008	Kitt Peak	Spacewatch	3:2	6.3 km	MPC · JPL
269295	2008 SZ_{50}	—	September 20, 2008	Mount Lemmon	Mount Lemmon Survey	·	1.0 km	MPC · JPL
269296	2008 SU_{52}	—	September 20, 2008	Mount Lemmon	Mount Lemmon Survey	·	2.5 km	MPC · JPL
269297	2008 SC_{68}	—	September 21, 2008	Catalina	CSS	·	3.0 km	MPC · JPL
269298	2008 SB_{71}	—	September 22, 2008	Kitt Peak	Spacewatch	·	3.3 km	MPC · JPL
269299	2008 SK_{74}	—	September 23, 2008	Catalina	CSS	·	5.2 km	MPC · JPL
269300 Diego	2008 SB_{82}	Diego	September 26, 2008	La Cañada	Lacruz, J.	·	3.8 km	MPC · JPL

== 269301–269400 ==
back to top

Designation			Discovery			Properties		Ref
Permanent	Provisional	Named after	Date	Site	Discoverer(s)	Category	Diam.	Ref
269301	2008 SB_{88}	—	September 20, 2008	Catalina	CSS	·	5.8 km	MPC · JPL
269302	2008 ST_{109}	—	September 22, 2008	Kitt Peak	Spacewatch	·	4.7 km	MPC · JPL
269303	2008 SL_{110}	—	September 22, 2008	Kitt Peak	Spacewatch	·	2.6 km	MPC · JPL
269304	2008 SV_{110}	—	September 22, 2008	Kitt Peak	Spacewatch	·	5.0 km	MPC · JPL
269305	2008 SA_{114}	—	September 22, 2008	Kitt Peak	Spacewatch	·	2.4 km	MPC · JPL
269306	2008 SD_{130}	—	September 22, 2008	Kitt Peak	Spacewatch	·	4.1 km	MPC · JPL
269307	2008 SK_{139}	—	September 23, 2008	Siding Spring	SSS	EOS	2.5 km	MPC · JPL
269308	2008 SW_{145}	—	September 22, 2008	Kitt Peak	Spacewatch	·	5.5 km	MPC · JPL
269309	2008 SV_{151}	—	September 30, 2008	Desert Moon	Stevens, B. L.	·	3.2 km	MPC · JPL
269310	2008 SA_{153}	—	September 22, 2008	Socorro	LINEAR	·	1.5 km	MPC · JPL
269311	2008 SC_{154}	—	September 22, 2008	Socorro	LINEAR	·	4.4 km	MPC · JPL
269312	2008 SK_{154}	—	September 22, 2008	Socorro	LINEAR	·	2.7 km	MPC · JPL
269313	2008 SK_{155}	—	September 23, 2008	Socorro	LINEAR	·	5.1 km	MPC · JPL
269314	2008 SD_{159}	—	September 24, 2008	Socorro	LINEAR	·	3.5 km	MPC · JPL
269315	2008 SD_{166}	—	September 28, 2008	Socorro	LINEAR	THM	4.4 km	MPC · JPL
269316	2008 SJ_{166}	—	September 28, 2008	Socorro	LINEAR	·	5.5 km	MPC · JPL
269317	2008 SG_{168}	—	September 30, 2008	Socorro	LINEAR	·	2.8 km	MPC · JPL
269318	2008 SJ_{171}	—	September 21, 2008	Mount Lemmon	Mount Lemmon Survey	·	3.5 km	MPC · JPL
269319	2008 SS_{172}	—	September 22, 2008	Mount Lemmon	Mount Lemmon Survey	·	3.5 km	MPC · JPL
269320	2008 SL_{176}	—	September 23, 2008	Mount Lemmon	Mount Lemmon Survey	(5)	1.5 km	MPC · JPL
269321	2008 SA_{177}	—	September 23, 2008	Mount Lemmon	Mount Lemmon Survey	·	2.1 km	MPC · JPL
269322	2008 SR_{207}	—	September 27, 2008	Goodricke-Pigott	R. A. Tucker	·	3.7 km	MPC · JPL
269323 Madisonvillehigh	2008 SE_{209}	Madisonvillehigh	September 28, 2008	Charleston	Astronomical Research Observatory	·	2.2 km	MPC · JPL
269324	2008 SL_{219}	—	September 30, 2008	La Sagra	OAM	·	4.8 km	MPC · JPL
269325	2008 SO_{221}	—	September 25, 2008	Mount Lemmon	Mount Lemmon Survey	·	1.8 km	MPC · JPL
269326	2008 SH_{269}	—	September 21, 2008	Catalina	CSS	·	3.2 km	MPC · JPL
269327	2008 SC_{278}	—	September 28, 2008	Mount Lemmon	Mount Lemmon Survey	L4	10 km	MPC · JPL
269328	2008 SY_{282}	—	September 29, 2008	Mount Lemmon	Mount Lemmon Survey	·	3.2 km	MPC · JPL
269329	2008 SJ_{285}	—	September 20, 2008	Mount Lemmon	Mount Lemmon Survey	·	3.4 km	MPC · JPL
269330	2008 TU_{1}	—	October 2, 2008	Pla D'Arguines	R. Ferrando	·	4.6 km	MPC · JPL
269331	2008 TV_{3}	—	October 3, 2008	Socorro	LINEAR	·	4.2 km	MPC · JPL
269332	2008 TK_{6}	—	October 3, 2008	La Sagra	OAM	T_{j} (2.97) · HIL · 3:2	5.8 km	MPC · JPL
269333	2008 TA_{17}	—	October 1, 2008	Mount Lemmon	Mount Lemmon Survey	·	2.7 km	MPC · JPL
269334	2008 TY_{17}	—	October 1, 2008	Mount Lemmon	Mount Lemmon Survey	·	5.7 km	MPC · JPL
269335	2008 TD_{19}	—	October 1, 2008	Mount Lemmon	Mount Lemmon Survey	THM	3.0 km	MPC · JPL
269336	2008 TS_{27}	—	October 1, 2008	La Sagra	OAM	·	2.7 km	MPC · JPL
269337	2008 TC_{30}	—	October 1, 2008	Mount Lemmon	Mount Lemmon Survey	THM	2.5 km	MPC · JPL
269338	2008 TM_{30}	—	October 1, 2008	Kitt Peak	Spacewatch	·	1.9 km	MPC · JPL
269339	2008 TJ_{37}	—	October 1, 2008	Mount Lemmon	Mount Lemmon Survey	·	2.9 km	MPC · JPL
269340	2008 TB_{40}	—	October 1, 2008	Mount Lemmon	Mount Lemmon Survey	·	4.9 km	MPC · JPL
269341	2008 TD_{52}	—	October 2, 2008	Kitt Peak	Spacewatch	·	4.3 km	MPC · JPL
269342	2008 TU_{91}	—	October 4, 2008	La Sagra	OAM	·	2.7 km	MPC · JPL
269343	2008 TZ_{94}	—	October 6, 2008	La Sagra	OAM	·	7.1 km	MPC · JPL
269344	2008 TH_{95}	—	October 6, 2008	Kitt Peak	Spacewatch	·	1.3 km	MPC · JPL
269345	2008 TG_{106}	—	October 6, 2008	Kitt Peak	Spacewatch	3:2	4.0 km	MPC · JPL
269346	2008 TB_{110}	—	October 6, 2008	Mount Lemmon	Mount Lemmon Survey	·	3.7 km	MPC · JPL
269347	2008 TV_{110}	—	October 6, 2008	Catalina	CSS	CYB	5.5 km	MPC · JPL
269348	2008 TT_{134}	—	October 8, 2008	Kitt Peak	Spacewatch	·	4.5 km	MPC · JPL
269349	2008 TT_{179}	—	October 1, 2008	Catalina	CSS	·	3.8 km	MPC · JPL
269350	2008 US_{9}	—	October 17, 2008	Kitt Peak	Spacewatch	·	2.4 km	MPC · JPL
269351	2008 UW_{11}	—	October 17, 2008	Kitt Peak	Spacewatch	·	3.3 km	MPC · JPL
269352	2008 UM_{12}	—	October 17, 2008	Kitt Peak	Spacewatch	KOR	1.8 km	MPC · JPL
269353	2008 UO_{36}	—	October 20, 2008	Kitt Peak	Spacewatch	·	3.7 km	MPC · JPL
269354	2008 UW_{50}	—	October 20, 2008	Mount Lemmon	Mount Lemmon Survey	·	4.0 km	MPC · JPL
269355	2008 UR_{61}	—	October 21, 2008	Kitt Peak	Spacewatch	·	3.6 km	MPC · JPL
269356	2008 UF_{90}	—	October 26, 2008	Cordell-Lorenz	D. T. Durig	L4	10 km	MPC · JPL
269357	2008 UL_{97}	—	October 25, 2008	Socorro	LINEAR	·	2.8 km	MPC · JPL
269358	2008 UN_{122}	—	October 22, 2008	Kitt Peak	Spacewatch	·	1.4 km	MPC · JPL
269359	2008 UJ_{205}	—	October 27, 2008	Catalina	CSS	·	6.5 km	MPC · JPL
269360	2008 UN_{249}	—	October 27, 2008	Mount Lemmon	Mount Lemmon Survey	·	3.4 km	MPC · JPL
269361	2008 UN_{323}	—	October 31, 2008	Catalina	CSS	slow	4.8 km	MPC · JPL
269362	2008 UZ_{334}	—	October 20, 2008	Kitt Peak	Spacewatch	·	4.4 km	MPC · JPL
269363	2008 UB_{338}	—	October 20, 2008	Kitt Peak	Spacewatch	·	6.1 km	MPC · JPL
269364	2008 US_{354}	—	October 27, 2008	Mount Lemmon	Mount Lemmon Survey	·	3.9 km	MPC · JPL
269365	2008 VA_{43}	—	November 3, 2008	Catalina	CSS	·	5.4 km	MPC · JPL
269366	2008 WB_{6}	—	November 17, 2008	Kitt Peak	Spacewatch	·	1.8 km	MPC · JPL
269367	2008 WL_{6}	—	November 17, 2008	Kitt Peak	Spacewatch	·	1.8 km	MPC · JPL
269368	2008 WL_{49}	—	November 18, 2008	Catalina	CSS	3:2	7.0 km	MPC · JPL
269369	2008 WK_{140}	—	November 18, 2008	Catalina	CSS	·	2.4 km	MPC · JPL
269370	2008 YX_{40}	—	December 30, 2008	Kitt Peak	Spacewatch	·	2.5 km	MPC · JPL
269371	2008 YE_{168}	—	December 30, 2008	Catalina	CSS	·	3.8 km	MPC · JPL
269372	2008 YS_{169}	—	December 31, 2008	Mount Lemmon	Mount Lemmon Survey	·	4.5 km	MPC · JPL
269373	2008 YT_{172}	—	December 22, 2008	Kitt Peak	Spacewatch	·	2.5 km	MPC · JPL
269374	2009 AF_{17}	—	January 13, 2009	Calvin-Rehoboth	Calvin College	·	5.3 km	MPC · JPL
269375	2009 DV_{46}	—	February 28, 2009	Socorro	LINEAR	·	5.1 km	MPC · JPL
269376	2009 DP_{57}	—	February 22, 2009	Kitt Peak	Spacewatch	·	4.9 km	MPC · JPL
269377	2009 NB_{1}	—	July 14, 2009	La Sagra	OAM	·	4.1 km	MPC · JPL
269378	2009 NH_{2}	—	July 14, 2009	Kitt Peak	Spacewatch	EUN	1.8 km	MPC · JPL
269379	2009 OW_{3}	—	July 21, 2009	Črni Vrh	Matičič, S.	EUP	5.6 km	MPC · JPL
269380	2009 PM_{10}	—	August 15, 2009	La Sagra	OAM	·	960 m	MPC · JPL
269381	2009 PG_{20}	—	August 15, 2009	Kitt Peak	Spacewatch	·	1.6 km	MPC · JPL
269382	2009 QW	—	August 17, 2009	Catalina	CSS	·	3.8 km	MPC · JPL
269383	2009 QG_{1}	—	August 16, 2009	La Sagra	OAM	·	920 m	MPC · JPL
269384	2009 QX_{2}	—	August 16, 2009	Kitt Peak	Spacewatch	WIT	1.1 km	MPC · JPL
269385	2009 QY_{3}	—	August 16, 2009	Kitt Peak	Spacewatch	·	2.2 km	MPC · JPL
269386	2009 QY_{14}	—	August 16, 2009	Kitt Peak	Spacewatch	·	1.5 km	MPC · JPL
269387	2009 QT_{22}	—	August 20, 2009	La Sagra	OAM	MAS	910 m	MPC · JPL
269388	2009 QX_{22}	—	August 20, 2009	La Sagra	OAM	·	1.9 km	MPC · JPL
269389	2009 QH_{28}	—	August 20, 2009	Hibiscus	Teamo, N.	·	1.2 km	MPC · JPL
269390 Igortkachenko	2009 QA_{34}	Igortkachenko	August 27, 2009	Tzec Maun	L. Elenin	·	1.4 km	MPC · JPL
269391	2009 QM_{37}	—	August 31, 2009	Taunus	Karge, S., R. Kling	·	1.8 km	MPC · JPL
269392	2009 QX_{37}	—	August 29, 2009	Bergisch Gladbach	W. Bickel	·	830 m	MPC · JPL
269393	2009 QS_{44}	—	August 27, 2009	Kitt Peak	Spacewatch	·	3.1 km	MPC · JPL
269394	2009 QC_{45}	—	August 27, 2009	Catalina	CSS	NYS	1.2 km	MPC · JPL
269395	2009 QX_{50}	—	August 26, 2009	La Sagra	OAM	·	990 m	MPC · JPL
269396	2009 QQ_{60}	—	August 18, 2009	Catalina	CSS	·	1.6 km	MPC · JPL
269397	2009 RB	—	September 2, 2009	La Sagra	OAM	EUN	2.5 km	MPC · JPL
269398	2009 RE_{3}	—	September 10, 2009	La Sagra	OAM	ADE	2.4 km	MPC · JPL
269399	2009 RZ_{5}	—	September 14, 2009	Catalina	CSS	V	870 m	MPC · JPL
269400	2009 RN_{8}	—	September 12, 2009	Kitt Peak	Spacewatch	·	1.3 km	MPC · JPL

== 269401–269500 ==
back to top

Designation			Discovery			Properties		Ref
Permanent	Provisional	Named after	Date	Site	Discoverer(s)	Category	Diam.	Ref
269401	2009 RO_{8}	—	September 12, 2009	Kitt Peak	Spacewatch	·	2.4 km	MPC · JPL
269402	2009 RH_{12}	—	September 12, 2009	Kitt Peak	Spacewatch	NYS	1.6 km	MPC · JPL
269403	2009 RT_{13}	—	September 12, 2009	Kitt Peak	Spacewatch	·	1.6 km	MPC · JPL
269404	2009 RL_{15}	—	September 12, 2009	Kitt Peak	Spacewatch	V	750 m	MPC · JPL
269405	2009 RN_{28}	—	September 12, 2009	Kitt Peak	Spacewatch	·	1.1 km	MPC · JPL
269406	2009 RK_{29}	—	September 14, 2009	Kitt Peak	Spacewatch	·	1.9 km	MPC · JPL
269407	2009 RS_{30}	—	September 14, 2009	Kitt Peak	Spacewatch	·	930 m	MPC · JPL
269408	2009 RD_{46}	—	September 15, 2009	Kitt Peak	Spacewatch	·	2.7 km	MPC · JPL
269409	2009 RQ_{52}	—	September 15, 2009	Kitt Peak	Spacewatch	·	1.3 km	MPC · JPL
269410	2009 RB_{54}	—	September 15, 2009	Kitt Peak	Spacewatch	·	2.5 km	MPC · JPL
269411	2009 RZ_{55}	—	September 15, 2009	Kitt Peak	Spacewatch	·	3.0 km	MPC · JPL
269412	2009 RM_{69}	—	September 15, 2009	Kitt Peak	Spacewatch	·	1.3 km	MPC · JPL
269413	2009 SK_{20}	—	September 22, 2009	Kachina	Hobart, J.	·	990 m	MPC · JPL
269414	2009 SX_{20}	—	September 18, 2009	Kitt Peak	Spacewatch	·	1.9 km	MPC · JPL
269415	2009 SV_{32}	—	September 16, 2009	Kitt Peak	Spacewatch	·	3.7 km	MPC · JPL
269416	2009 SL_{39}	—	September 16, 2009	Kitt Peak	Spacewatch	·	3.1 km	MPC · JPL
269417	2009 SF_{46}	—	September 16, 2009	Kitt Peak	Spacewatch	·	1.8 km	MPC · JPL
269418	2009 SM_{52}	—	September 17, 2009	Kitt Peak	Spacewatch	NYS	1.6 km	MPC · JPL
269419	2009 ST_{66}	—	September 17, 2009	Kitt Peak	Spacewatch	·	2.6 km	MPC · JPL
269420	2009 SD_{107}	—	March 27, 2003	Kitt Peak	Spacewatch	L4	10 km	MPC · JPL
269421	2009 SB_{119}	—	September 18, 2009	Kitt Peak	Spacewatch	·	1.5 km	MPC · JPL
269422	2009 SX_{121}	—	September 18, 2009	Kitt Peak	Spacewatch	·	980 m	MPC · JPL
269423	2009 SQ_{128}	—	September 18, 2009	Kitt Peak	Spacewatch	·	2.3 km	MPC · JPL
269424	2009 SE_{131}	—	September 18, 2009	Kitt Peak	Spacewatch	·	1.1 km	MPC · JPL
269425	2009 SE_{132}	—	September 18, 2009	Kitt Peak	Spacewatch	·	2.9 km	MPC · JPL
269426	2009 SW_{132}	—	September 18, 2009	Kitt Peak	Spacewatch	·	1.1 km	MPC · JPL
269427	2009 SU_{134}	—	September 18, 2009	Kitt Peak	Spacewatch	·	1.3 km	MPC · JPL
269428	2009 SD_{135}	—	September 18, 2009	Kitt Peak	Spacewatch	·	1.4 km	MPC · JPL
269429	2009 SG_{135}	—	September 18, 2009	Kitt Peak	Spacewatch	·	810 m	MPC · JPL
269430	2009 SB_{147}	—	September 19, 2009	Kitt Peak	Spacewatch	·	3.3 km	MPC · JPL
269431	2009 SP_{148}	—	September 19, 2009	Mount Lemmon	Mount Lemmon Survey	·	4.9 km	MPC · JPL
269432	2009 SN_{150}	—	September 20, 2009	Kitt Peak	Spacewatch	V	920 m	MPC · JPL
269433	2009 SL_{163}	—	September 21, 2009	Mount Lemmon	Mount Lemmon Survey	MAS	840 m	MPC · JPL
269434	2009 SR_{164}	—	September 21, 2009	Kitt Peak	Spacewatch	EOS	2.7 km	MPC · JPL
269435	2009 SO_{165}	—	September 22, 2009	Kitt Peak	Spacewatch	·	800 m	MPC · JPL
269436	2009 SP_{174}	—	September 18, 2009	Purple Mountain	PMO NEO Survey Program	·	840 m	MPC · JPL
269437	2009 SP_{200}	—	September 22, 2009	Kitt Peak	Spacewatch	CLA	1.6 km	MPC · JPL
269438	2009 SY_{202}	—	September 22, 2009	Kitt Peak	Spacewatch	·	2.1 km	MPC · JPL
269439	2009 SV_{204}	—	September 22, 2009	Kitt Peak	Spacewatch	·	960 m	MPC · JPL
269440	2009 SE_{206}	—	September 23, 2009	Kitt Peak	Spacewatch	·	1.1 km	MPC · JPL
269441	2009 SJ_{212}	—	September 23, 2009	Kitt Peak	Spacewatch	·	1.6 km	MPC · JPL
269442	2009 SC_{220}	—	September 24, 2009	Mount Lemmon	Mount Lemmon Survey	·	1.5 km	MPC · JPL
269443	2009 SP_{224}	—	September 25, 2009	Kitt Peak	Spacewatch	BRA	2.1 km	MPC · JPL
269444	2009 SR_{230}	—	September 16, 2009	Mount Lemmon	Mount Lemmon Survey	TIR	4.0 km	MPC · JPL
269445	2009 SZ_{233}	—	September 23, 2009	Mount Lemmon	Mount Lemmon Survey	·	950 m	MPC · JPL
269446	2009 SJ_{238}	—	June 17, 2005	Mount Lemmon	Mount Lemmon Survey	·	1.7 km	MPC · JPL
269447	2009 SH_{245}	—	September 28, 2009	Mayhill	D. Chestnov, A. Novichonok	·	1.2 km	MPC · JPL
269448	2009 SA_{250}	—	September 18, 2009	Kitt Peak	Spacewatch	·	2.6 km	MPC · JPL
269449	2009 SC_{253}	—	September 22, 2009	Mount Lemmon	Mount Lemmon Survey	·	2.0 km	MPC · JPL
269450	2009 SD_{253}	—	September 22, 2009	Mount Lemmon	Mount Lemmon Survey	·	2.7 km	MPC · JPL
269451	2009 SE_{256}	—	September 21, 2009	Mount Lemmon	Mount Lemmon Survey	·	920 m	MPC · JPL
269452	2009 SM_{267}	—	September 23, 2009	Mount Lemmon	Mount Lemmon Survey	·	3.9 km	MPC · JPL
269453	2009 SY_{270}	—	September 24, 2009	Kitt Peak	Spacewatch	V	890 m	MPC · JPL
269454	2009 SC_{272}	—	September 24, 2009	Kitt Peak	Spacewatch	·	2.2 km	MPC · JPL
269455	2009 SA_{276}	—	September 25, 2009	Kitt Peak	Spacewatch	·	1.9 km	MPC · JPL
269456	2009 SB_{277}	—	September 25, 2009	Kitt Peak	Spacewatch	·	2.6 km	MPC · JPL
269457	2009 SQ_{289}	—	September 25, 2009	Kitt Peak	Spacewatch	·	1.3 km	MPC · JPL
269458	2009 SW_{297}	—	September 28, 2009	Mount Lemmon	Mount Lemmon Survey	·	2.2 km	MPC · JPL
269459	2009 SJ_{333}	—	September 25, 2009	Catalina	CSS	NYS	1.1 km	MPC · JPL
269460	2009 SB_{336}	—	September 23, 2009	Kitt Peak	Spacewatch	·	1.7 km	MPC · JPL
269461	2009 SA_{345}	—	September 18, 2009	Kitt Peak	Spacewatch	·	1.4 km	MPC · JPL
269462	2009 SE_{346}	—	September 23, 2009	Kitt Peak	Spacewatch	·	1.7 km	MPC · JPL
269463	2009 SZ_{347}	—	September 16, 2009	Kitt Peak	Spacewatch	(2076)	740 m	MPC · JPL
269464	2009 SK_{348}	—	September 24, 2009	Catalina	CSS	L4	13 km	MPC · JPL
269465	2009 SF_{350}	—	September 22, 2009	Mount Lemmon	Mount Lemmon Survey	·	2.8 km	MPC · JPL
269466	2009 SR_{360}	—	September 16, 2009	Mount Lemmon	Mount Lemmon Survey	·	920 m	MPC · JPL
269467	2009 SM_{361}	—	September 27, 2009	Socorro	LINEAR	·	2.9 km	MPC · JPL
269468	2009 SP_{363}	—	September 20, 2009	Kitt Peak	Spacewatch	·	910 m	MPC · JPL
269469	2009 TB_{18}	—	October 15, 2009	La Sagra	OAM	·	3.3 km	MPC · JPL
269470	2009 TF_{20}	—	October 11, 2009	Catalina	CSS	MAS	920 m	MPC · JPL
269471	2009 TP_{21}	—	October 12, 2009	La Sagra	OAM	·	2.3 km	MPC · JPL
269472	2009 TB_{24}	—	October 14, 2009	Catalina	CSS	·	2.2 km	MPC · JPL
269473	2009 TR_{25}	—	October 14, 2009	Catalina	CSS	·	2.7 km	MPC · JPL
269474	2009 TG_{27}	—	October 14, 2009	La Sagra	OAM	·	2.7 km	MPC · JPL
269475	2009 TQ_{32}	—	October 14, 2009	Catalina	CSS	·	3.0 km	MPC · JPL
269476	2009 TR_{34}	—	October 12, 2009	La Sagra	OAM	·	2.4 km	MPC · JPL
269477	2009 TM_{35}	—	October 14, 2009	La Sagra	OAM	·	2.1 km	MPC · JPL
269478	2009 TP_{35}	—	October 14, 2009	La Sagra	OAM	·	3.3 km	MPC · JPL
269479	2009 TH_{36}	—	October 14, 2009	Catalina	CSS	MAS	830 m	MPC · JPL
269480	2009 TC_{39}	—	October 15, 2009	Catalina	CSS	·	2.6 km	MPC · JPL
269481	2009 TC_{42}	—	October 12, 2009	Mount Lemmon	Mount Lemmon Survey	·	4.9 km	MPC · JPL
269482	2009 TO_{42}	—	October 12, 2009	Mount Lemmon	Mount Lemmon Survey	·	4.4 km	MPC · JPL
269483	2009 TB_{44}	—	October 14, 2009	Mount Lemmon	Mount Lemmon Survey	·	1.5 km	MPC · JPL
269484 Marcia	2009 UB_{4}	Marcia	October 19, 2009	Falera	J. De Queiroz	·	2.6 km	MPC · JPL
269485 Bisikalo	2009 UQ_{14}	Bisikalo	October 21, 2009	Zelenchukskaya Stn	T. V. Krjačko	·	4.8 km	MPC · JPL
269486	2009 UW_{15}	—	October 17, 2009	La Sagra	OAM	·	5.0 km	MPC · JPL
269487	2009 UW_{17}	—	October 20, 2009	Mayhill	Mayhill	·	1.5 km	MPC · JPL
269488	2009 UJ_{18}	—	October 17, 2009	Bisei SG Center	BATTeRS	AGN	1.8 km	MPC · JPL
269489	2009 UY_{20}	—	October 22, 2009	Bisei SG Center	BATTeRS	·	2.7 km	MPC · JPL
269490	2009 UH_{23}	—	October 18, 2009	La Sagra	OAM	·	1.7 km	MPC · JPL
269491	2009 UR_{25}	—	October 20, 2009	Socorro	LINEAR	·	2.1 km	MPC · JPL
269492	2009 UG_{30}	—	October 18, 2009	Mount Lemmon	Mount Lemmon Survey	THM	2.7 km	MPC · JPL
269493	2009 UF_{31}	—	October 18, 2009	Mount Lemmon	Mount Lemmon Survey	EOS	3.0 km	MPC · JPL
269494	2009 UU_{31}	—	October 18, 2009	Mount Lemmon	Mount Lemmon Survey	·	4.1 km	MPC · JPL
269495	2009 UB_{32}	—	October 18, 2009	Mount Lemmon	Mount Lemmon Survey	THM	3.1 km	MPC · JPL
269496	2009 UC_{35}	—	October 21, 2009	Mount Lemmon	Mount Lemmon Survey	·	3.5 km	MPC · JPL
269497	2009 UR_{37}	—	October 22, 2009	Mount Lemmon	Mount Lemmon Survey	·	2.3 km	MPC · JPL
269498	2009 US_{51}	—	October 22, 2009	Mount Lemmon	Mount Lemmon Survey	·	1.7 km	MPC · JPL
269499	2009 UD_{53}	—	October 22, 2009	Catalina	CSS	·	2.6 km	MPC · JPL
269500	2009 UT_{59}	—	October 23, 2009	Kitt Peak	Spacewatch	·	1.0 km	MPC · JPL

== 269501–269600 ==
back to top

Designation			Discovery			Properties		Ref
Permanent	Provisional	Named after	Date	Site	Discoverer(s)	Category	Diam.	Ref
269501	2009 UG_{72}	—	October 23, 2009	Mount Lemmon	Mount Lemmon Survey	·	5.6 km	MPC · JPL
269502	2009 UZ_{72}	—	October 23, 2009	Kitt Peak	Spacewatch	·	5.1 km	MPC · JPL
269503	2009 UX_{80}	—	October 22, 2009	Catalina	CSS	·	1.9 km	MPC · JPL
269504	2009 UT_{88}	—	October 22, 2009	Catalina	CSS	EOS	2.7 km	MPC · JPL
269505	2009 UA_{89}	—	October 24, 2009	Catalina	CSS	·	1.5 km	MPC · JPL
269506	2009 UY_{89}	—	October 17, 2009	La Sagra	OAM	·	3.5 km	MPC · JPL
269507	2009 UU_{91}	—	October 18, 2009	Catalina	CSS	·	3.1 km	MPC · JPL
269508	2009 UX_{95}	—	October 22, 2009	Mount Lemmon	Mount Lemmon Survey	·	1.5 km	MPC · JPL
269509	2009 UQ_{98}	—	October 23, 2009	Mount Lemmon	Mount Lemmon Survey	3:2 · SHU	5.6 km	MPC · JPL
269510	2009 UE_{99}	—	October 23, 2009	Mount Lemmon	Mount Lemmon Survey	·	1.9 km	MPC · JPL
269511	2009 UH_{108}	—	October 23, 2009	Kitt Peak	Spacewatch	KOR	1.7 km	MPC · JPL
269512	2009 UL_{109}	—	October 23, 2009	Kitt Peak	Spacewatch	·	3.3 km	MPC · JPL
269513	2009 UV_{109}	—	October 23, 2009	Mount Lemmon	Mount Lemmon Survey	·	3.0 km	MPC · JPL
269514	2009 UL_{110}	—	October 23, 2009	Kitt Peak	Spacewatch	HOF	3.4 km	MPC · JPL
269515	2009 UA_{115}	—	October 21, 2009	Mount Lemmon	Mount Lemmon Survey	V	680 m	MPC · JPL
269516	2009 UN_{127}	—	October 26, 2009	La Sagra	OAM	·	4.9 km	MPC · JPL
269517	2009 UD_{129}	—	October 28, 2009	La Sagra	OAM	TIR ·	6.5 km	MPC · JPL
269518	2009 UQ_{132}	—	October 16, 2009	Catalina	CSS	TIR	2.4 km	MPC · JPL
269519	2009 US_{146}	—	October 23, 2009	Kitt Peak	Spacewatch	·	2.2 km	MPC · JPL
269520	2009 UC_{147}	—	October 26, 2009	Mount Lemmon	Mount Lemmon Survey	·	1.5 km	MPC · JPL
269521	2009 UU_{147}	—	October 17, 2009	Mount Lemmon	Mount Lemmon Survey	·	1.7 km	MPC · JPL
269522	2009 UP_{152}	—	October 27, 2009	Mount Lemmon	Mount Lemmon Survey	T_{j} (2.97) · 3:2	4.4 km	MPC · JPL
269523	2009 VR_{7}	—	November 8, 2009	Catalina	CSS	EOS	5.5 km	MPC · JPL
269524	2009 VX_{16}	—	November 8, 2009	Mount Lemmon	Mount Lemmon Survey	CYB	6.1 km	MPC · JPL
269525	2009 VB_{27}	—	November 8, 2009	Kitt Peak	Spacewatch	3:2 · SHU	4.2 km	MPC · JPL
269526	2009 VQ_{41}	—	November 9, 2009	Catalina	CSS	·	2.1 km	MPC · JPL
269527	2009 VY_{42}	—	November 9, 2009	Kitt Peak	Spacewatch	·	4.0 km	MPC · JPL
269528	2009 VN_{44}	—	November 15, 2009	Mayhill	Mayhill	MAR	1.9 km	MPC · JPL
269529	2009 VG_{48}	—	November 9, 2009	Mount Lemmon	Mount Lemmon Survey	·	1.1 km	MPC · JPL
269530	2009 VF_{60}	—	November 10, 2009	Catalina	CSS	EUP	6.4 km	MPC · JPL
269531	2009 VR_{65}	—	November 9, 2009	Kitt Peak	Spacewatch	·	1.9 km	MPC · JPL
269532	2009 VU_{66}	—	November 9, 2009	Kitt Peak	Spacewatch	VER	4.3 km	MPC · JPL
269533	2009 VH_{69}	—	November 9, 2009	Mount Lemmon	Mount Lemmon Survey	KOR	1.4 km	MPC · JPL
269534	2009 VA_{82}	—	November 8, 2009	Kitt Peak	Spacewatch	·	1.1 km	MPC · JPL
269535	2009 VK_{82}	—	November 8, 2009	Kitt Peak	Spacewatch	·	3.4 km	MPC · JPL
269536	2009 VG_{83}	—	November 9, 2009	Kitt Peak	Spacewatch	·	2.9 km	MPC · JPL
269537	2009 VF_{84}	—	November 9, 2009	Kitt Peak	Spacewatch	·	2.6 km	MPC · JPL
269538	2009 VZ_{85}	—	November 10, 2009	Kitt Peak	Spacewatch	·	1.5 km	MPC · JPL
269539	2009 VD_{92}	—	November 12, 2009	La Sagra	OAM	·	3.6 km	MPC · JPL
269540	2009 VJ_{92}	—	November 8, 2009	Mount Lemmon	Mount Lemmon Survey	·	3.7 km	MPC · JPL
269541	2009 VT_{93}	—	November 11, 2009	Mount Lemmon	Mount Lemmon Survey	·	1.3 km	MPC · JPL
269542	2009 VK_{94}	—	November 8, 2009	Kitt Peak	Spacewatch	·	2.5 km	MPC · JPL
269543	2009 VQ_{95}	—	November 10, 2009	Kitt Peak	Spacewatch	·	3.1 km	MPC · JPL
269544	2009 VC_{104}	—	November 15, 2009	Catalina	CSS	WIT	1.3 km	MPC · JPL
269545	2009 VN_{106}	—	November 11, 2009	Catalina	CSS	·	3.1 km	MPC · JPL
269546	2009 VE_{108}	—	November 8, 2009	Kitt Peak	Spacewatch	CYB	7.0 km	MPC · JPL
269547	2009 VG_{111}	—	November 11, 2009	La Sagra	OAM	·	1.9 km	MPC · JPL
269548 Fratyu	2009 WR	Fratyu	November 16, 2009	Plana	Fratev, F.	·	2.2 km	MPC · JPL
269549	2009 WS_{5}	—	December 12, 1999	Kitt Peak	Spacewatch	L4	10 km	MPC · JPL
269550 Chur	2009 WT_{5}	Chur	November 16, 2009	Falera	J. De Queiroz	·	2.5 km	MPC · JPL
269551	2009 WU_{8}	—	November 19, 2009	Vail-Jarnac	Jarnac	·	2.8 km	MPC · JPL
269552	2009 WZ_{14}	—	November 16, 2009	Mount Lemmon	Mount Lemmon Survey	·	4.0 km	MPC · JPL
269553	2009 WX_{15}	—	November 16, 2009	La Sagra	OAM	·	1.5 km	MPC · JPL
269554	2009 WD_{25}	—	November 21, 2009	Calvin-Rehoboth	L. A. Molnar	·	2.8 km	MPC · JPL
269555	2009 WF_{27}	—	November 16, 2009	Kitt Peak	Spacewatch	·	1.6 km	MPC · JPL
269556	2009 WM_{33}	—	November 16, 2009	Kitt Peak	Spacewatch	·	3.8 km	MPC · JPL
269557	2009 WW_{33}	—	November 16, 2009	Kitt Peak	Spacewatch	THM	2.4 km	MPC · JPL
269558	2009 WM_{41}	—	September 22, 2003	Kitt Peak	Spacewatch	·	3.7 km	MPC · JPL
269559	2009 WY_{46}	—	November 18, 2009	Mount Lemmon	Mount Lemmon Survey	EOS	3.3 km	MPC · JPL
269560	2009 WQ_{50}	—	November 19, 2009	La Sagra	OAM	·	5.1 km	MPC · JPL
269561	2009 WK_{68}	—	January 5, 2006	Kitt Peak	Spacewatch	·	3.2 km	MPC · JPL
269562	2009 WM_{68}	—	November 17, 2009	Mount Lemmon	Mount Lemmon Survey	·	2.7 km	MPC · JPL
269563	2009 WR_{73}	—	November 18, 2009	Kitt Peak	Spacewatch	·	2.0 km	MPC · JPL
269564	2009 WW_{73}	—	November 18, 2009	Kitt Peak	Spacewatch	THM	3.8 km	MPC · JPL
269565	2009 WT_{82}	—	November 19, 2009	Kitt Peak	Spacewatch	·	4.2 km	MPC · JPL
269566	2009 WT_{85}	—	November 19, 2009	Kitt Peak	Spacewatch	·	5.1 km	MPC · JPL
269567 Bakhtinov	2009 WK_{105}	Bakhtinov	November 24, 2009	Tzec Maun	Nevski, V.	·	2.2 km	MPC · JPL
269568	2009 WS_{105}	—	November 25, 2009	Tzec Maun	D. Chestnov, A. Novichonok	HYG	4.5 km	MPC · JPL
269569	2009 WO_{123}	—	November 20, 2009	Kitt Peak	Spacewatch	KOR	1.6 km	MPC · JPL
269570	2009 WQ_{125}	—	November 20, 2009	Kitt Peak	Spacewatch	AST	1.9 km	MPC · JPL
269571	2009 WP_{161}	—	November 21, 2009	Kitt Peak	Spacewatch	·	2.7 km	MPC · JPL
269572	2009 WF_{176}	—	November 23, 2009	Kitt Peak	Spacewatch	·	3.1 km	MPC · JPL
269573	2009 WC_{179}	—	November 23, 2009	Kitt Peak	Spacewatch	·	3.3 km	MPC · JPL
269574	2009 WN_{182}	—	November 23, 2009	Kitt Peak	Spacewatch	WIT	1.6 km	MPC · JPL
269575	2009 WE_{197}	—	November 25, 2009	Mount Lemmon	Mount Lemmon Survey	(5)	2.6 km	MPC · JPL
269576	2009 WT_{198}	—	November 26, 2009	Mount Lemmon	Mount Lemmon Survey	T_{j} (2.99) · 3:2	5.0 km	MPC · JPL
269577	2009 WM_{199}	—	November 26, 2009	Mount Lemmon	Mount Lemmon Survey	PAD	2.5 km	MPC · JPL
269578	2009 WR_{203}	—	November 16, 2009	Kitt Peak	Spacewatch	·	2.2 km	MPC · JPL
269579	2009 WS_{204}	—	November 17, 2009	Kitt Peak	Spacewatch	HOF	3.1 km	MPC · JPL
269580	2009 WL_{215}	—	November 26, 2009	Catalina	CSS	·	3.3 km	MPC · JPL
269581	2009 WN_{217}	—	November 16, 2009	Mount Lemmon	Mount Lemmon Survey	·	3.0 km	MPC · JPL
269582	2009 WX_{222}	—	November 16, 2009	Mount Lemmon	Mount Lemmon Survey	HOF	3.1 km	MPC · JPL
269583	2009 WO_{230}	—	November 17, 2009	Kitt Peak	Spacewatch	·	2.7 km	MPC · JPL
269584	2009 WR_{250}	—	November 24, 2009	Kitt Peak	Spacewatch	·	3.6 km	MPC · JPL
269585	2009 WO_{251}	—	November 27, 2009	Mount Lemmon	Mount Lemmon Survey	·	3.0 km	MPC · JPL
269586	2009 WJ_{254}	—	November 17, 2009	Kitt Peak	Spacewatch	HOF	3.6 km	MPC · JPL
269587	2009 WB_{260}	—	November 21, 2009	Kitt Peak	Spacewatch	·	3.0 km	MPC · JPL
269588	2009 WR_{260}	—	November 21, 2009	Kitt Peak	Spacewatch	KOR	1.7 km	MPC · JPL
269589 Kryachko	2009 XN_{1}	Kryachko	December 10, 2009	Tzec Maun	Nevski, V.	EOS	2.8 km	MPC · JPL
269590	2009 XC_{4}	—	December 10, 2009	Mount Lemmon	Mount Lemmon Survey	THM	2.4 km	MPC · JPL
269591	2009 XO_{7}	—	December 12, 2009	La Sagra	OAM	(5)	2.1 km	MPC · JPL
269592	2009 XA_{13}	—	April 8, 2002	Kitt Peak	Spacewatch	·	2.2 km	MPC · JPL
269593	2009 YU_{2}	—	December 17, 2009	Mount Lemmon	Mount Lemmon Survey	VER	6.3 km	MPC · JPL
269594	2010 AM_{36}	—	January 7, 2010	Kitt Peak	Spacewatch	·	5.2 km	MPC · JPL
269595	2010 AZ_{79}	—	January 12, 2010	Kitt Peak	Spacewatch	·	3.0 km	MPC · JPL
269596	2010 AY_{96}	—	January 9, 2010	WISE	WISE	·	4.4 km	MPC · JPL
269597	2010 AC_{99}	—	January 12, 2010	WISE	WISE	·	3.9 km	MPC · JPL
269598	2010 BF_{70}	—	December 3, 2004	Kitt Peak	Spacewatch	·	4.7 km	MPC · JPL
269599	2010 BR_{80}	—	January 25, 2010	WISE	WISE	·	3.4 km	MPC · JPL
269600	2010 BR_{85}	—	November 3, 2004	Catalina	CSS	·	5.1 km	MPC · JPL

== 269601–269700 ==
back to top

Designation			Discovery			Properties		Ref
Permanent	Provisional	Named after	Date	Site	Discoverer(s)	Category	Diam.	Ref
269601	2010 CX_{1}	—	February 5, 2010	Catalina	CSS	·	2.6 km	MPC · JPL
269602	2010 CY_{18}	—	February 6, 2010	Mount Lemmon	Mount Lemmon Survey	·	2.1 km	MPC · JPL
269603	2010 CH_{22}	—	February 9, 2010	Catalina	CSS	·	4.7 km	MPC · JPL
269604	2010 CF_{32}	—	February 9, 2010	Kitt Peak	Spacewatch	·	1.6 km	MPC · JPL
269605	2010 CG_{32}	—	February 9, 2010	Kitt Peak	Spacewatch	·	4.4 km	MPC · JPL
269606	2010 CU_{52}	—	February 14, 2010	WISE	WISE	·	4.6 km	MPC · JPL
269607	2010 CG_{89}	—	February 14, 2010	Mount Lemmon	Mount Lemmon Survey	·	1.3 km	MPC · JPL
269608	2010 CF_{108}	—	February 14, 2010	Catalina	CSS	·	3.0 km	MPC · JPL
269609	2010 CH_{139}	—	February 9, 2010	Kitt Peak	Spacewatch	·	4.0 km	MPC · JPL
269610	2010 CQ_{143}	—	February 9, 2010	Kitt Peak	Spacewatch	·	2.7 km	MPC · JPL
269611	2010 CQ_{191}	—	January 11, 2003	Kitt Peak	Spacewatch	3:2 · SHU	4.6 km	MPC · JPL
269612	2010 CJ_{198}	—	February 14, 2010	WISE	WISE	·	5.0 km	MPC · JPL
269613	2010 DE_{14}	—	February 17, 2010	WISE	WISE	·	3.6 km	MPC · JPL
269614	2010 DU_{52}	—	February 22, 2010	WISE	WISE	·	4.7 km	MPC · JPL
269615	2010 DB_{76}	—	February 18, 2010	Mount Lemmon	Mount Lemmon Survey	·	2.4 km	MPC · JPL
269616	2010 EO_{111}	—	March 4, 2010	Kitt Peak	Spacewatch	NYS	2.5 km	MPC · JPL
269617	2010 JY_{122}	—	May 14, 2010	Kitt Peak	Spacewatch	·	5.3 km	MPC · JPL
269618	2010 KU_{117}	—	May 18, 2010	La Sagra	OAM	·	1.3 km	MPC · JPL
269619	2010 SL_{16}	—	May 13, 2007	Mount Lemmon	Mount Lemmon Survey	·	4.1 km	MPC · JPL
269620	2010 UJ_{58}	—	September 5, 2008	Kitt Peak	Spacewatch	L4	10 km	MPC · JPL
269621	2010 UX_{96}	—	March 10, 2002	Palomar	NEAT	L4	18 km	MPC · JPL
269622	2010 VF_{38}	—	October 9, 2010	Catalina	CSS	L4	10 km	MPC · JPL
269623	2010 VA_{173}	—	November 18, 1998	Kitt Peak	M. W. Buie	L4	10 km	MPC · JPL
269624	2010 VQ_{180}	—	December 20, 2004	Mount Lemmon	Mount Lemmon Survey	3:2	6.8 km	MPC · JPL
269625	2010 XE_{51}	—	December 18, 2001	Socorro	LINEAR	·	1.7 km	MPC · JPL
269626	2010 XZ_{75}	—	December 6, 2000	Kitt Peak	Spacewatch	·	2.4 km	MPC · JPL
269627	2011 AV	—	December 18, 2004	Kitt Peak	Spacewatch	·	4.3 km	MPC · JPL
269628	2011 AN_{23}	—	January 31, 1997	Prescott	P. G. Comba	(32418)	3.4 km	MPC · JPL
269629	2011 AD_{27}	—	January 23, 2006	Kitt Peak	Spacewatch	·	3.8 km	MPC · JPL
269630	2011 AO_{28}	—	February 26, 2006	Anderson Mesa	LONEOS	·	7.5 km	MPC · JPL
269631	2011 AG_{29}	—	February 1, 1997	Kitt Peak	Spacewatch	·	1.2 km	MPC · JPL
269632	2011 AK_{34}	—	September 29, 2003	Kitt Peak	Spacewatch	·	2.4 km	MPC · JPL
269633	2011 AJ_{44}	—	February 29, 2000	Socorro	LINEAR	THM	3.1 km	MPC · JPL
269634	2011 AE_{45}	—	March 6, 1994	Kitt Peak	Spacewatch	·	720 m	MPC · JPL
269635	2011 AS_{45}	—	September 19, 1998	Caussols	ODAS	·	1.7 km	MPC · JPL
269636	2011 AU_{45}	—	October 15, 2004	Mount Lemmon	Mount Lemmon Survey	·	1.5 km	MPC · JPL
269637	2011 AF_{46}	—	January 10, 1997	Kitt Peak	Spacewatch	·	2.9 km	MPC · JPL
269638	2011 AM_{53}	—	February 9, 2003	Palomar	NEAT	·	1.9 km	MPC · JPL
269639	2011 AV_{59}	—	October 3, 2004	Palomar	NEAT	·	2.1 km	MPC · JPL
269640	2011 AM_{74}	—	February 3, 2000	Socorro	LINEAR	·	5.5 km	MPC · JPL
269641	4245 P-L	—	September 24, 1960	Palomar	C. J. van Houten, I. van Houten-Groeneveld, T. Gehrels	·	1.7 km	MPC · JPL
269642	6215 P-L	—	September 24, 1960	Palomar	C. J. van Houten, I. van Houten-Groeneveld, T. Gehrels	·	950 m	MPC · JPL
269643	6765 P-L	—	September 24, 1960	Palomar	C. J. van Houten, I. van Houten-Groeneveld, T. Gehrels	·	790 m	MPC · JPL
269644	2642 T-3	—	October 16, 1977	Palomar	C. J. van Houten, I. van Houten-Groeneveld, T. Gehrels	·	3.7 km	MPC · JPL
269645	1991 VX_{8}	—	November 4, 1991	Kitt Peak	Spacewatch	·	4.0 km	MPC · JPL
269646	1991 VR_{9}	—	November 4, 1991	Kitt Peak	Spacewatch	ADE	2.8 km	MPC · JPL
269647	1992 HF_{2}	—	April 27, 1992	Kitt Peak	Spacewatch	V	920 m	MPC · JPL
269648	1992 QE_{3}	—	August 25, 1992	Palomar	Lowe, A.	·	1.7 km	MPC · JPL
269649	1993 BG_{11}	—	January 22, 1993	Kitt Peak	Spacewatch	·	1.3 km	MPC · JPL
269650	1994 GR_{4}	—	April 6, 1994	Kitt Peak	Spacewatch	RAF	1.1 km	MPC · JPL
269651	1994 GS_{7}	—	April 12, 1994	Kitt Peak	Spacewatch	BAR	1.8 km	MPC · JPL
269652	1994 PE_{31}	—	August 12, 1994	La Silla	E. W. Elst	·	2.8 km	MPC · JPL
269653	1994 RR_{7}	—	September 12, 1994	Kitt Peak	Spacewatch	·	980 m	MPC · JPL
269654	1994 SS_{2}	—	September 28, 1994	Kitt Peak	Spacewatch	·	2.1 km	MPC · JPL
269655	1995 BU_{9}	—	January 29, 1995	Kitt Peak	Spacewatch	·	1.0 km	MPC · JPL
269656	1995 CD_{5}	—	February 1, 1995	Kitt Peak	Spacewatch	·	1.6 km	MPC · JPL
269657	1995 FP_{3}	—	March 23, 1995	Kitt Peak	Spacewatch	·	3.0 km	MPC · JPL
269658	1995 FQ_{3}	—	March 23, 1995	Kitt Peak	Spacewatch	·	3.6 km	MPC · JPL
269659	1995 FK_{5}	—	March 23, 1995	Kitt Peak	Spacewatch	·	1.6 km	MPC · JPL
269660	1995 GU_{5}	—	April 6, 1995	Kitt Peak	Spacewatch	·	3.2 km	MPC · JPL
269661	1995 MJ_{1}	—	June 22, 1995	Kitt Peak	Spacewatch	·	3.7 km	MPC · JPL
269662	1995 MR_{5}	—	June 23, 1995	Kitt Peak	Spacewatch	·	3.6 km	MPC · JPL
269663	1995 MP_{7}	—	June 30, 1995	Kitt Peak	Spacewatch	·	4.0 km	MPC · JPL
269664	1995 OB_{13}	—	July 22, 1995	Kitt Peak	Spacewatch	·	1.1 km	MPC · JPL
269665	1995 SV_{25}	—	September 19, 1995	Kitt Peak	Spacewatch	·	730 m	MPC · JPL
269666	1995 SU_{28}	—	September 20, 1995	Kitt Peak	Spacewatch	·	1.6 km	MPC · JPL
269667	1995 SW_{38}	—	September 24, 1995	Kitt Peak	Spacewatch	·	4.8 km	MPC · JPL
269668	1995 SB_{46}	—	September 26, 1995	Kitt Peak	Spacewatch	MAS	480 m	MPC · JPL
269669	1995 SV_{51}	—	September 26, 1995	Kitt Peak	Spacewatch	·	2.1 km	MPC · JPL
269670	1995 SM_{61}	—	September 20, 1995	Kitt Peak	Spacewatch	·	1.5 km	MPC · JPL
269671	1995 SH_{78}	—	September 30, 1995	Kitt Peak	Spacewatch	·	2.1 km	MPC · JPL
269672	1995 UR_{15}	—	October 17, 1995	Kitt Peak	Spacewatch	HOF	2.7 km	MPC · JPL
269673	1995 UE_{22}	—	October 19, 1995	Kitt Peak	Spacewatch	·	970 m	MPC · JPL
269674	1995 UH_{24}	—	October 19, 1995	Kitt Peak	Spacewatch	·	1.8 km	MPC · JPL
269675	1995 UX_{56}	—	October 25, 1995	Kitt Peak	Spacewatch	V	870 m	MPC · JPL
269676	1995 UB_{62}	—	October 24, 1995	Kitt Peak	Spacewatch	·	1.2 km	MPC · JPL
269677	1995 UK_{65}	—	October 27, 1995	Kitt Peak	Spacewatch	·	3.0 km	MPC · JPL
269678	1995 UF_{80}	—	October 24, 1995	Kitt Peak	Spacewatch	·	2.8 km	MPC · JPL
269679	1995 VZ_{8}	—	November 14, 1995	Kitt Peak	Spacewatch	·	1.0 km	MPC · JPL
269680	1995 WA_{12}	—	November 16, 1995	Kitt Peak	Spacewatch	·	1.4 km	MPC · JPL
269681	1995 WB_{12}	—	November 16, 1995	Kitt Peak	Spacewatch	·	2.3 km	MPC · JPL
269682	1995 WD_{17}	—	November 17, 1995	Kitt Peak	Spacewatch	NYS	950 m	MPC · JPL
269683	1995 WD_{33}	—	November 20, 1995	Kitt Peak	Spacewatch	·	810 m	MPC · JPL
269684	1995 YF_{18}	—	December 22, 1995	Kitt Peak	Spacewatch	JUN	1.9 km	MPC · JPL
269685	1996 BQ_{10}	—	January 24, 1996	Kitt Peak	Spacewatch	·	1.4 km	MPC · JPL
269686	1996 EH_{8}	—	March 12, 1996	Kitt Peak	Spacewatch	·	3.7 km	MPC · JPL
269687	1996 GR_{6}	—	April 12, 1996	Kitt Peak	Spacewatch	·	1.6 km	MPC · JPL
269688	1996 JJ_{11}	—	May 15, 1996	Kitt Peak	Spacewatch	V	860 m	MPC · JPL
269689	1996 LL_{2}	—	June 8, 1996	Kitt Peak	Spacewatch	V	1 km	MPC · JPL
269690	1996 RG_{3}	—	September 14, 1996	Kitt Peak	Spacewatch	APO · PHA	890 m	MPC · JPL
269691	1996 RR_{7}	—	September 5, 1996	Kitt Peak	Spacewatch	·	1.8 km	MPC · JPL
269692	1996 TN_{16}	—	October 4, 1996	Kitt Peak	Spacewatch	·	3.5 km	MPC · JPL
269693	1996 TY_{30}	—	October 8, 1996	Kitt Peak	Spacewatch	H	590 m	MPC · JPL
269694	1996 UF_{3}	—	October 31, 1996	Prescott	P. G. Comba	H	760 m	MPC · JPL
269695	1996 VW_{1}	—	November 6, 1996	Stroncone	A. Vagnozzi	·	800 m	MPC · JPL
269696	1997 GE_{10}	—	April 3, 1997	Socorro	LINEAR	·	2.4 km	MPC · JPL
269697	1997 HS_{9}	—	April 30, 1997	Socorro	LINEAR	·	960 m	MPC · JPL
269698	1997 MV_{9}	—	June 27, 1997	Kitt Peak	Spacewatch	·	2.5 km	MPC · JPL
269699	1997 NO_{2}	—	July 3, 1997	Kitt Peak	Spacewatch	·	1.7 km	MPC · JPL
269700	1997 PZ_{3}	—	August 12, 1997	Pises	Pises	EOS	2.2 km	MPC · JPL

== 269701–269800 ==
back to top

Designation			Discovery			Properties		Ref
Permanent	Provisional	Named after	Date	Site	Discoverer(s)	Category	Diam.	Ref
269701	1997 TA_{11}	—	October 3, 1997	Kitt Peak	Spacewatch	EOS	2.6 km	MPC · JPL
269702	1997 TP_{21}	—	October 4, 1997	Kitt Peak	Spacewatch	NYS	1.3 km	MPC · JPL
269703	1997 UR_{7}	—	October 23, 1997	Ondřejov	L. Kotková	·	1.8 km	MPC · JPL
269704	1997 UR_{17}	—	October 25, 1997	Kitt Peak	Spacewatch	·	4.0 km	MPC · JPL
269705	1997 UR_{24}	—	October 31, 1997	Bergisch Gladbach	W. Bickel	EOS	2.6 km	MPC · JPL
269706	1997 WX_{7}	—	November 23, 1997	Chichibu	N. Satō	·	2.6 km	MPC · JPL
269707	1998 BB_{22}	—	January 23, 1998	Kitt Peak	Spacewatch	EUN	1.6 km	MPC · JPL
269708	1998 DO_{12}	—	February 24, 1998	Kitt Peak	Spacewatch	·	2.1 km	MPC · JPL
269709	1998 DF_{23}	—	February 24, 1998	Kitt Peak	Spacewatch	·	1.4 km	MPC · JPL
269710	1998 FM_{2}	—	March 20, 1998	Socorro	LINEAR	BAR	1.7 km	MPC · JPL
269711	1998 FM_{6}	—	March 18, 1998	Kitt Peak	Spacewatch	EUN	1.2 km	MPC · JPL
269712	1998 FZ_{120}	—	March 20, 1998	Socorro	LINEAR	ADE	3.5 km	MPC · JPL
269713	1998 HU_{42}	—	April 23, 1998	Kitt Peak	Spacewatch	·	1.9 km	MPC · JPL
269714	1998 HG_{142}	—	April 21, 1998	Socorro	LINEAR	·	2.2 km	MPC · JPL
269715	1998 KN_{40}	—	May 22, 1998	Socorro	LINEAR	·	1.1 km	MPC · JPL
269716	1998 MM_{16}	—	June 27, 1998	Kitt Peak	Spacewatch	·	1.2 km	MPC · JPL
269717	1998 QO	—	August 17, 1998	Socorro	LINEAR	·	2.1 km	MPC · JPL
269718	1998 QG_{3}	—	August 17, 1998	Socorro	LINEAR	PHO	1.4 km	MPC · JPL
269719	1998 QH_{56}	—	August 28, 1998	Socorro	LINEAR	·	810 m	MPC · JPL
269720	1998 QK_{58}	—	August 30, 1998	Kitt Peak	Spacewatch	·	1.1 km	MPC · JPL
269721	1998 QE_{96}	—	August 19, 1998	Socorro	LINEAR	·	1.5 km	MPC · JPL
269722	1998 RY_{4}	—	September 14, 1998	Socorro	LINEAR	PHO	1.6 km	MPC · JPL
269723	1998 RU_{9}	—	September 13, 1998	Kitt Peak	Spacewatch	·	780 m	MPC · JPL
269724	1998 RP_{23}	—	September 14, 1998	Socorro	LINEAR	·	2.9 km	MPC · JPL
269725	1998 RQ_{43}	—	September 14, 1998	Socorro	LINEAR	·	1.0 km	MPC · JPL
269726	1998 RQ_{65}	—	September 14, 1998	Socorro	LINEAR	T_{j} (2.94)	6.1 km	MPC · JPL
269727	1998 SL_{3}	—	September 17, 1998	Caussols	ODAS	·	2.5 km	MPC · JPL
269728	1998 SM_{29}	—	September 18, 1998	Kitt Peak	Spacewatch	·	1.1 km	MPC · JPL
269729	1998 SH_{40}	—	September 24, 1998	Kitt Peak	Spacewatch	·	2.2 km	MPC · JPL
269730	1998 SQ_{60}	—	September 17, 1998	Anderson Mesa	LONEOS	·	1.3 km	MPC · JPL
269731	1998 SG_{63}	—	September 26, 1998	Xinglong	SCAP	·	1.9 km	MPC · JPL
269732	1998 SG_{86}	—	September 26, 1998	Socorro	LINEAR	NYS	1.3 km	MPC · JPL
269733	1998 SW_{93}	—	September 26, 1998	Socorro	LINEAR	V	890 m	MPC · JPL
269734	1998 SP_{110}	—	September 26, 1998	Socorro	LINEAR	·	1.5 km	MPC · JPL
269735	1998 SS_{124}	—	September 26, 1998	Socorro	LINEAR	·	1.5 km	MPC · JPL
269736	1998 SH_{162}	—	September 26, 1998	Socorro	LINEAR	NYS	990 m	MPC · JPL
269737	1998 SR_{165}	—	September 18, 1998	Catalina	CSS	·	1.6 km	MPC · JPL
269738	1998 TF_{10}	—	October 12, 1998	Kitt Peak	Spacewatch	·	2.2 km	MPC · JPL
269739	1998 TB_{11}	—	October 12, 1998	Kitt Peak	Spacewatch	·	1.3 km	MPC · JPL
269740	1998 TF_{36}	—	October 15, 1998	Xinglong	SCAP	·	4.0 km	MPC · JPL
269741	1998 UY_{8}	—	October 17, 1998	Xinglong	SCAP	NYS	1.1 km	MPC · JPL
269742 Kroónorbert	1998 UH_{23}	Kroónorbert	October 23, 1998	Piszkéstető	L. Kiss, K. Sárneczky	·	1.1 km	MPC · JPL
269743	1998 VX_{42}	—	November 15, 1998	Kitt Peak	Spacewatch	·	3.0 km	MPC · JPL
269744	1998 WB_{5}	—	November 21, 1998	Catalina	CSS	PHO	1.8 km	MPC · JPL
269745	1998 WU_{8}	—	November 27, 1998	Višnjan	K. Korlević	·	1.8 km	MPC · JPL
269746	1998 WW_{25}	—	November 16, 1998	Kitt Peak	Spacewatch	MAS	760 m	MPC · JPL
269747	1998 WL_{29}	—	November 23, 1998	Kitt Peak	Spacewatch	THM	2.4 km	MPC · JPL
269748	1998 WO_{40}	—	November 23, 1998	Kitt Peak	Spacewatch	·	2.3 km	MPC · JPL
269749	1998 XT_{5}	—	December 8, 1998	Kitt Peak	Spacewatch	·	4.5 km	MPC · JPL
269750	1998 XA_{23}	—	December 11, 1998	Kitt Peak	Spacewatch	·	1.6 km	MPC · JPL
269751	1999 AC_{32}	—	January 15, 1999	Kitt Peak	Spacewatch	MAS	860 m	MPC · JPL
269752	1999 BW_{31}	—	January 19, 1999	Kitt Peak	Spacewatch	·	3.2 km	MPC · JPL
269753	1999 RS_{73}	—	September 7, 1999	Socorro	LINEAR	·	2.7 km	MPC · JPL
269754	1999 RW_{104}	—	September 8, 1999	Socorro	LINEAR	·	2.4 km	MPC · JPL
269755	1999 RH_{147}	—	September 9, 1999	Socorro	LINEAR	·	2.2 km	MPC · JPL
269756	1999 RM_{169}	—	September 9, 1999	Socorro	LINEAR	·	2.2 km	MPC · JPL
269757	1999 RR_{189}	—	September 9, 1999	Socorro	LINEAR	·	3.5 km	MPC · JPL
269758	1999 RJ_{220}	—	September 4, 1999	Catalina	CSS	·	690 m	MPC · JPL
269759	1999 RJ_{239}	—	September 8, 1999	Catalina	CSS	·	3.0 km	MPC · JPL
269760	1999 SS_{5}	—	September 30, 1999	Socorro	LINEAR	PHO	2.9 km	MPC · JPL
269761	1999 SN_{21}	—	September 30, 1999	Kitt Peak	Spacewatch	AGN	1.5 km	MPC · JPL
269762 Nocentini	1999 TN_{4}	Nocentini	October 4, 1999	Ceccano	G. Masi	·	1.1 km	MPC · JPL
269763	1999 TD_{32}	—	October 4, 1999	Socorro	LINEAR	·	4.1 km	MPC · JPL
269764	1999 TZ_{38}	—	October 3, 1999	Catalina	CSS	·	4.1 km	MPC · JPL
269765	1999 TL_{46}	—	October 4, 1999	Kitt Peak	Spacewatch	HOF	3.3 km	MPC · JPL
269766	1999 TW_{58}	—	October 6, 1999	Kitt Peak	Spacewatch	·	4.8 km	MPC · JPL
269767	1999 TK_{59}	—	October 7, 1999	Kitt Peak	Spacewatch	·	2.8 km	MPC · JPL
269768	1999 TM_{61}	—	October 7, 1999	Kitt Peak	Spacewatch	·	1.9 km	MPC · JPL
269769	1999 TP_{62}	—	October 7, 1999	Kitt Peak	Spacewatch	·	2.6 km	MPC · JPL
269770	1999 TV_{66}	—	October 8, 1999	Kitt Peak	Spacewatch	·	840 m	MPC · JPL
269771	1999 TW_{71}	—	October 9, 1999	Kitt Peak	Spacewatch	·	2.1 km	MPC · JPL
269772	1999 TJ_{76}	—	October 10, 1999	Kitt Peak	Spacewatch	AGN	1.5 km	MPC · JPL
269773	1999 TL_{87}	—	October 15, 1999	Kitt Peak	Spacewatch	KOR	1.6 km	MPC · JPL
269774	1999 TE_{103}	—	October 2, 1999	Socorro	LINEAR	·	2.5 km	MPC · JPL
269775	1999 TJ_{111}	—	October 4, 1999	Socorro	LINEAR	·	2.6 km	MPC · JPL
269776	1999 TT_{113}	—	October 4, 1999	Socorro	LINEAR	·	720 m	MPC · JPL
269777	1999 TO_{132}	—	October 6, 1999	Socorro	LINEAR	·	1.2 km	MPC · JPL
269778	1999 TE_{135}	—	October 6, 1999	Socorro	LINEAR	·	2.3 km	MPC · JPL
269779	1999 TK_{140}	—	October 6, 1999	Socorro	LINEAR	·	790 m	MPC · JPL
269780	1999 TF_{145}	—	October 7, 1999	Socorro	LINEAR	·	1.3 km	MPC · JPL
269781	1999 TN_{145}	—	October 7, 1999	Socorro	LINEAR	EUN	2.3 km	MPC · JPL
269782	1999 TV_{153}	—	October 7, 1999	Socorro	LINEAR	·	1.2 km	MPC · JPL
269783	1999 TT_{182}	—	October 11, 1999	Socorro	LINEAR	PHO	1.1 km	MPC · JPL
269784	1999 TZ_{210}	—	October 15, 1999	Socorro	LINEAR	·	3.2 km	MPC · JPL
269785	1999 TZ_{211}	—	October 15, 1999	Socorro	LINEAR	·	2.0 km	MPC · JPL
269786	1999 TV_{229}	—	October 6, 1999	Socorro	LINEAR	·	1.9 km	MPC · JPL
269787	1999 TK_{237}	—	October 4, 1999	Kitt Peak	Spacewatch	AGN	1.6 km	MPC · JPL
269788	1999 TE_{258}	—	October 9, 1999	Socorro	LINEAR	·	3.8 km	MPC · JPL
269789	1999 TX_{260}	—	October 12, 1999	Kitt Peak	Spacewatch	·	3.0 km	MPC · JPL
269790	1999 TV_{268}	—	October 3, 1999	Socorro	LINEAR	EOS	2.9 km	MPC · JPL
269791	1999 TF_{313}	—	October 9, 1999	Kitt Peak	Spacewatch	·	1.8 km	MPC · JPL
269792	1999 TW_{314}	—	October 8, 1999	Catalina	CSS	·	2.7 km	MPC · JPL
269793	1999 TV_{332}	—	October 13, 1999	Apache Point	SDSS	AGN	1.5 km	MPC · JPL
269794	1999 UE_{12}	—	October 31, 1999	Kitt Peak	Spacewatch	·	920 m	MPC · JPL
269795	1999 UL_{21}	—	October 31, 1999	Kitt Peak	Spacewatch	WAT	3.0 km	MPC · JPL
269796	1999 UN_{32}	—	October 31, 1999	Kitt Peak	Spacewatch	·	2.8 km	MPC · JPL
269797	1999 UR_{37}	—	October 16, 1999	Kitt Peak	Spacewatch	·	3.2 km	MPC · JPL
269798	1999 UR_{47}	—	October 30, 1999	Catalina	CSS	·	3.8 km	MPC · JPL
269799	1999 VZ_{12}	—	November 1, 1999	Socorro	LINEAR	PHO	1.3 km	MPC · JPL
269800	1999 VY_{16}	—	November 2, 1999	Kitt Peak	Spacewatch	·	3.5 km	MPC · JPL

== 269801–269900 ==
back to top

Designation			Discovery			Properties		Ref
Permanent	Provisional	Named after	Date	Site	Discoverer(s)	Category	Diam.	Ref
269801	1999 VC_{42}	—	November 4, 1999	Kitt Peak	Spacewatch	NEM	2.7 km	MPC · JPL
269802	1999 VV_{58}	—	November 4, 1999	Socorro	LINEAR	·	1.1 km	MPC · JPL
269803	1999 VJ_{82}	—	November 5, 1999	Socorro	LINEAR	·	3.7 km	MPC · JPL
269804	1999 VJ_{84}	—	November 6, 1999	Kitt Peak	Spacewatch	AGN	1.2 km	MPC · JPL
269805	1999 VK_{88}	—	November 4, 1999	Socorro	LINEAR	H	780 m	MPC · JPL
269806	1999 VM_{95}	—	November 9, 1999	Socorro	LINEAR	·	3.4 km	MPC · JPL
269807	1999 VN_{96}	—	November 9, 1999	Socorro	LINEAR	·	1.5 km	MPC · JPL
269808	1999 VZ_{102}	—	November 9, 1999	Socorro	LINEAR	·	870 m	MPC · JPL
269809	1999 VK_{104}	—	November 9, 1999	Socorro	LINEAR	·	1 km	MPC · JPL
269810	1999 VZ_{108}	—	November 9, 1999	Socorro	LINEAR	615	2.2 km	MPC · JPL
269811	1999 VN_{115}	—	November 4, 1999	Kitt Peak	Spacewatch	KOR	1.7 km	MPC · JPL
269812	1999 VW_{132}	—	November 10, 1999	Kitt Peak	Spacewatch	·	1.5 km	MPC · JPL
269813	1999 VF_{133}	—	November 10, 1999	Kitt Peak	Spacewatch	·	3.4 km	MPC · JPL
269814	1999 VV_{143}	—	November 11, 1999	Catalina	CSS	·	3.8 km	MPC · JPL
269815	1999 VL_{150}	—	November 14, 1999	Socorro	LINEAR	·	870 m	MPC · JPL
269816	1999 VS_{180}	—	November 7, 1999	Socorro	LINEAR	·	3.0 km	MPC · JPL
269817	1999 VZ_{193}	—	November 3, 1999	Socorro	LINEAR	·	1.1 km	MPC · JPL
269818	1999 VX_{211}	—	November 12, 1999	Socorro	LINEAR	·	1.4 km	MPC · JPL
269819	1999 VN_{213}	—	November 13, 1999	Anderson Mesa	LONEOS	·	3.1 km	MPC · JPL
269820	1999 WQ_{18}	—	November 30, 1999	Kitt Peak	Spacewatch	·	2.8 km	MPC · JPL
269821	1999 XA_{6}	—	December 4, 1999	Catalina	CSS	·	2.1 km	MPC · JPL
269822	1999 XO_{251}	—	December 9, 1999	Kitt Peak	Spacewatch	·	2.6 km	MPC · JPL
269823	1999 XW_{254}	—	December 12, 1999	Kitt Peak	Spacewatch	·	3.5 km	MPC · JPL
269824	2000 AY_{43}	—	January 2, 2000	Kitt Peak	Spacewatch	·	3.2 km	MPC · JPL
269825	2000 AZ_{44}	—	January 5, 2000	Kitt Peak	Spacewatch	·	3.6 km	MPC · JPL
269826	2000 AN_{94}	—	January 4, 2000	Socorro	LINEAR	·	5.0 km	MPC · JPL
269827	2000 AU_{158}	—	January 3, 2000	Socorro	LINEAR	·	1.2 km	MPC · JPL
269828	2000 AR_{207}	—	January 3, 2000	Kitt Peak	Spacewatch	LIX	5.3 km	MPC · JPL
269829	2000 AM_{209}	—	January 5, 2000	Kitt Peak	Spacewatch	EOS	2.7 km	MPC · JPL
269830	2000 AA_{249}	—	January 2, 2000	Kitt Peak	Spacewatch	·	3.8 km	MPC · JPL
269831	2000 AQ_{253}	—	January 7, 2000	Kitt Peak	Spacewatch	·	2.0 km	MPC · JPL
269832	2000 BK_{6}	—	January 29, 2000	Socorro	LINEAR	H	870 m	MPC · JPL
269833	2000 BN_{12}	—	January 28, 2000	Kitt Peak	Spacewatch	·	1.5 km	MPC · JPL
269834	2000 BG_{13}	—	January 29, 2000	Kitt Peak	Spacewatch	NYS	1.2 km	MPC · JPL
269835	2000 BG_{22}	—	January 30, 2000	Kitt Peak	Spacewatch	NYS	1.2 km	MPC · JPL
269836	2000 BG_{29}	—	January 30, 2000	Socorro	LINEAR	·	4.5 km	MPC · JPL
269837	2000 BP_{37}	—	January 26, 2000	Kitt Peak	Spacewatch	·	1.1 km	MPC · JPL
269838	2000 CY_{20}	—	February 2, 2000	Socorro	LINEAR	NYS	1.3 km	MPC · JPL
269839	2000 CR_{23}	—	February 2, 2000	Socorro	LINEAR	·	4.3 km	MPC · JPL
269840	2000 CA_{43}	—	February 2, 2000	Socorro	LINEAR	·	2.8 km	MPC · JPL
269841	2000 CS_{54}	—	February 2, 2000	Socorro	LINEAR	·	5.3 km	MPC · JPL
269842	2000 CU_{69}	—	February 1, 2000	Kitt Peak	Spacewatch	·	1.0 km	MPC · JPL
269843	2000 CD_{118}	—	February 3, 2000	Socorro	LINEAR	EOS	3.2 km	MPC · JPL
269844	2000 CH_{130}	—	February 3, 2000	Kitt Peak	Spacewatch	·	1.1 km	MPC · JPL
269845	2000 CL_{141}	—	February 6, 2000	Kitt Peak	Spacewatch	·	4.1 km	MPC · JPL
269846	2000 DQ_{9}	—	February 26, 2000	Kitt Peak	Spacewatch	·	830 m	MPC · JPL
269847	2000 DU_{21}	—	February 29, 2000	Socorro	LINEAR	THB	5.1 km	MPC · JPL
269848	2000 DE_{34}	—	February 29, 2000	Socorro	LINEAR	·	4.2 km	MPC · JPL
269849	2000 DY_{38}	—	February 29, 2000	Socorro	LINEAR	NYS	1.3 km	MPC · JPL
269850	2000 DM_{53}	—	February 29, 2000	Socorro	LINEAR	·	1.9 km	MPC · JPL
269851	2000 DV_{58}	—	February 29, 2000	Socorro	LINEAR	·	1.5 km	MPC · JPL
269852	2000 DK_{61}	—	February 29, 2000	Socorro	LINEAR	·	1.1 km	MPC · JPL
269853	2000 DB_{67}	—	February 29, 2000	Socorro	LINEAR	·	1.3 km	MPC · JPL
269854	2000 DF_{97}	—	February 29, 2000	Socorro	LINEAR	·	1.3 km	MPC · JPL
269855	2000 DK_{108}	—	February 29, 2000	Socorro	LINEAR	H	690 m	MPC · JPL
269856	2000 DT_{108}	—	February 29, 2000	Socorro	LINEAR	·	4.3 km	MPC · JPL
269857	2000 DD_{115}	—	February 27, 2000	Kitt Peak	Spacewatch	·	2.2 km	MPC · JPL
269858	2000 EB_{4}	—	March 4, 2000	Tebbutt	F. B. Zoltowski	NYS	1.4 km	MPC · JPL
269859	2000 EQ_{4}	—	March 2, 2000	Kitt Peak	Spacewatch	MAS	690 m	MPC · JPL
269860	2000 EM_{5}	—	March 2, 2000	Kitt Peak	Spacewatch	·	4.0 km	MPC · JPL
269861	2000 EJ_{6}	—	March 2, 2000	Kitt Peak	Spacewatch	·	3.8 km	MPC · JPL
269862	2000 EN_{15}	—	March 4, 2000	Socorro	LINEAR	H	870 m	MPC · JPL
269863	2000 ER_{22}	—	March 3, 2000	Kitt Peak	Spacewatch	EOS	2.3 km	MPC · JPL
269864	2000 EY_{22}	—	March 3, 2000	Kitt Peak	Spacewatch	·	3.3 km	MPC · JPL
269865	2000 ER_{52}	—	March 3, 2000	Kitt Peak	Spacewatch	MAS	670 m	MPC · JPL
269866	2000 EY_{59}	—	March 10, 2000	Socorro	LINEAR	·	2.5 km	MPC · JPL
269867	2000 ES_{65}	—	March 10, 2000	Socorro	LINEAR	H	720 m	MPC · JPL
269868	2000 EM_{90}	—	March 9, 2000	Socorro	LINEAR	·	4.4 km	MPC · JPL
269869	2000 ER_{135}	—	March 11, 2000	Anderson Mesa	LONEOS	·	4.8 km	MPC · JPL
269870	2000 EN_{171}	—	March 5, 2000	Socorro	LINEAR	·	2.4 km	MPC · JPL
269871	2000 EC_{189}	—	February 11, 2000	Kitt Peak	Spacewatch	·	3.9 km	MPC · JPL
269872	2000 EB_{196}	—	March 3, 2000	Socorro	LINEAR	·	1.1 km	MPC · JPL
269873	2000 EJ_{196}	—	March 3, 2000	Socorro	LINEAR	·	3.5 km	MPC · JPL
269874	2000 EJ_{207}	—	March 8, 2000	Socorro	LINEAR	PHO	1.4 km	MPC · JPL
269875	2000 FK_{2}	—	March 25, 2000	Kitt Peak	Spacewatch	·	4.5 km	MPC · JPL
269876	2000 FW_{57}	—	March 26, 2000	Anderson Mesa	LONEOS	·	5.5 km	MPC · JPL
269877	2000 FV_{73}	—	March 26, 2000	Anderson Mesa	LONEOS	·	6.2 km	MPC · JPL
269878	2000 GK_{4}	—	April 4, 2000	Socorro	LINEAR	·	1.8 km	MPC · JPL
269879	2000 GP_{11}	—	April 5, 2000	Socorro	LINEAR	·	6.1 km	MPC · JPL
269880	2000 GK_{13}	—	April 5, 2000	Socorro	LINEAR	EOS	3.1 km	MPC · JPL
269881	2000 GF_{15}	—	April 8, 2000	Socorro	LINEAR	·	1.9 km	MPC · JPL
269882	2000 GM_{21}	—	April 5, 2000	Socorro	LINEAR	·	4.6 km	MPC · JPL
269883	2000 GP_{26}	—	April 5, 2000	Socorro	LINEAR	MAS	930 m	MPC · JPL
269884	2000 GH_{27}	—	April 5, 2000	Socorro	LINEAR	·	1.4 km	MPC · JPL
269885	2000 GG_{34}	—	April 5, 2000	Socorro	LINEAR	MAS	860 m	MPC · JPL
269886	2000 GT_{35}	—	April 5, 2000	Socorro	LINEAR	MAS	860 m	MPC · JPL
269887	2000 GV_{36}	—	April 5, 2000	Socorro	LINEAR	·	3.2 km	MPC · JPL
269888	2000 GX_{38}	—	April 5, 2000	Socorro	LINEAR	·	2.7 km	MPC · JPL
269889	2000 GU_{43}	—	April 5, 2000	Socorro	LINEAR	·	1.6 km	MPC · JPL
269890	2000 GA_{48}	—	April 5, 2000	Socorro	LINEAR	THM	2.9 km	MPC · JPL
269891	2000 GJ_{52}	—	April 5, 2000	Socorro	LINEAR	·	5.7 km	MPC · JPL
269892	2000 GZ_{69}	—	April 5, 2000	Socorro	LINEAR	·	4.9 km	MPC · JPL
269893	2000 GO_{77}	—	April 5, 2000	Socorro	LINEAR	·	1.5 km	MPC · JPL
269894	2000 GQ_{77}	—	April 5, 2000	Socorro	LINEAR	·	4.4 km	MPC · JPL
269895	2000 GX_{115}	—	April 8, 2000	Socorro	LINEAR	·	1.4 km	MPC · JPL
269896	2000 GA_{119}	—	April 3, 2000	Kitt Peak	Spacewatch	MAS	810 m	MPC · JPL
269897	2000 GH_{119}	—	April 3, 2000	Kitt Peak	Spacewatch	·	3.1 km	MPC · JPL
269898	2000 GD_{129}	—	April 5, 2000	Kitt Peak	Spacewatch	V	820 m	MPC · JPL
269899	2000 GM_{129}	—	April 5, 2000	Kitt Peak	Spacewatch	MAS	780 m	MPC · JPL
269900	2000 GB_{131}	—	April 7, 2000	Kitt Peak	Spacewatch	·	1.2 km	MPC · JPL

== 269901–270000 ==
back to top

Designation			Discovery			Properties		Ref
Permanent	Provisional	Named after	Date	Site	Discoverer(s)	Category	Diam.	Ref
269901	2000 HP	—	April 24, 2000	Kitt Peak	Spacewatch	·	4.3 km	MPC · JPL
269902	2000 HU_{3}	—	April 26, 2000	Kitt Peak	Spacewatch	·	1.4 km	MPC · JPL
269903	2000 HQ_{15}	—	April 29, 2000	Socorro	LINEAR	EUP	4.5 km	MPC · JPL
269904	2000 HW_{17}	—	April 24, 2000	Kitt Peak	Spacewatch	·	1.4 km	MPC · JPL
269905	2000 HA_{18}	—	April 24, 2000	Kitt Peak	Spacewatch	·	1.1 km	MPC · JPL
269906	2000 HV_{18}	—	April 25, 2000	Kitt Peak	Spacewatch	EOS	2.7 km	MPC · JPL
269907	2000 HC_{19}	—	April 25, 2000	Kitt Peak	Spacewatch	·	1.4 km	MPC · JPL
269908	2000 HW_{37}	—	April 27, 2000	Socorro	LINEAR	·	5.5 km	MPC · JPL
269909	2000 HX_{43}	—	April 30, 2000	Kitt Peak	Spacewatch	·	3.4 km	MPC · JPL
269910	2000 HY_{43}	—	April 30, 2000	Kitt Peak	Spacewatch	·	4.9 km	MPC · JPL
269911	2000 HF_{49}	—	April 29, 2000	Socorro	LINEAR	·	6.2 km	MPC · JPL
269912	2000 HR_{77}	—	April 28, 2000	Socorro	LINEAR	·	5.4 km	MPC · JPL
269913	2000 HS_{79}	—	April 28, 2000	Anderson Mesa	LONEOS	·	5.3 km	MPC · JPL
269914	2000 JV_{8}	—	May 7, 2000	Prescott	P. G. Comba	NYS	1.4 km	MPC · JPL
269915	2000 JA_{42}	—	May 7, 2000	Socorro	LINEAR	MAS	1 km	MPC · JPL
269916	2000 JM_{42}	—	May 7, 2000	Socorro	LINEAR	·	2.0 km	MPC · JPL
269917	2000 JN_{48}	—	May 9, 2000	Socorro	LINEAR	·	2.0 km	MPC · JPL
269918	2000 JN_{64}	—	May 4, 2000	Anderson Mesa	LONEOS	·	2.2 km	MPC · JPL
269919	2000 JZ_{84}	—	May 5, 2000	Kitt Peak	Spacewatch	·	4.0 km	MPC · JPL
269920	2000 KB_{9}	—	May 28, 2000	Socorro	LINEAR	LIX	5.2 km	MPC · JPL
269921	2000 KJ_{37}	—	May 24, 2000	Kitt Peak	Spacewatch	THM	2.4 km	MPC · JPL
269922	2000 KA_{49}	—	May 28, 2000	Kitt Peak	Spacewatch	·	1.9 km	MPC · JPL
269923	2000 KE_{74}	—	May 27, 2000	Socorro	LINEAR	ERI	1.9 km	MPC · JPL
269924	2000 LC_{6}	—	June 5, 2000	Kitt Peak	Spacewatch	VER	3.7 km	MPC · JPL
269925	2000 NS_{12}	—	July 5, 2000	Anderson Mesa	LONEOS	·	1.7 km	MPC · JPL
269926	2000 NR_{28}	—	July 2, 2000	Kitt Peak	Spacewatch	·	1.4 km	MPC · JPL
269927	2000 OM_{22}	—	July 31, 2000	Socorro	LINEAR	·	1.9 km	MPC · JPL
269928	2000 OO_{59}	—	July 29, 2000	Anderson Mesa	LONEOS	·	1.9 km	MPC · JPL
269929	2000 QV_{19}	—	August 24, 2000	Socorro	LINEAR	(5)	1.4 km	MPC · JPL
269930	2000 QG_{156}	—	August 31, 2000	Socorro	LINEAR	(5)	1.5 km	MPC · JPL
269931	2000 QV_{168}	—	August 31, 2000	Socorro	LINEAR	·	1.7 km	MPC · JPL
269932	2000 QU_{205}	—	August 31, 2000	Socorro	LINEAR	·	1.6 km	MPC · JPL
269933	2000 QG_{214}	—	August 31, 2000	Socorro	LINEAR	·	2.2 km	MPC · JPL
269934	2000 QP_{227}	—	August 31, 2000	Socorro	LINEAR	·	2.1 km	MPC · JPL
269935	2000 QY_{247}	—	August 28, 2000	Cerro Tololo	M. W. Buie	·	1.2 km	MPC · JPL
269936	2000 RK_{27}	—	September 1, 2000	Socorro	LINEAR	·	2.7 km	MPC · JPL
269937	2000 RY_{39}	—	September 3, 2000	Socorro	LINEAR	·	2.1 km	MPC · JPL
269938	2000 RU_{80}	—	September 1, 2000	Socorro	LINEAR	·	2.3 km	MPC · JPL
269939	2000 RV_{80}	—	September 1, 2000	Socorro	LINEAR	·	2.8 km	MPC · JPL
269940	2000 RO_{81}	—	September 1, 2000	Socorro	LINEAR	·	2.5 km	MPC · JPL
269941	2000 RQ_{98}	—	September 5, 2000	Anderson Mesa	LONEOS	·	2.0 km	MPC · JPL
269942	2000 RK_{103}	—	September 5, 2000	Anderson Mesa	LONEOS	EUN	2.2 km	MPC · JPL
269943	2000 SV_{10}	—	September 24, 2000	Prescott	P. G. Comba	·	820 m	MPC · JPL
269944	2000 SR_{14}	—	September 23, 2000	Socorro	LINEAR	·	2.8 km	MPC · JPL
269945	2000 ST_{15}	—	September 23, 2000	Socorro	LINEAR	EUN	2.1 km	MPC · JPL
269946	2000 SO_{31}	—	September 24, 2000	Socorro	LINEAR	EUN	1.6 km	MPC · JPL
269947	2000 SB_{36}	—	September 24, 2000	Socorro	LINEAR	·	1.2 km	MPC · JPL
269948	2000 SN_{58}	—	September 24, 2000	Socorro	LINEAR	(5)	1.6 km	MPC · JPL
269949	2000 ST_{61}	—	September 24, 2000	Socorro	LINEAR	RAF	1.4 km	MPC · JPL
269950	2000 SX_{98}	—	September 23, 2000	Socorro	LINEAR	·	2.1 km	MPC · JPL
269951	2000 SZ_{103}	—	September 24, 2000	Socorro	LINEAR	·	1.6 km	MPC · JPL
269952	2000 SS_{110}	—	September 24, 2000	Socorro	LINEAR	·	1.6 km	MPC · JPL
269953	2000 SH_{163}	—	September 30, 2000	Ondřejov	P. Kušnirák, P. Pravec	·	1.5 km	MPC · JPL
269954	2000 SB_{192}	—	September 24, 2000	Socorro	LINEAR	·	1.9 km	MPC · JPL
269955	2000 SR_{218}	—	September 26, 2000	Socorro	LINEAR	·	2.6 km	MPC · JPL
269956	2000 SV_{231}	—	September 24, 2000	Socorro	LINEAR	·	4.1 km	MPC · JPL
269957	2000 SJ_{232}	—	September 27, 2000	Socorro	LINEAR	BAR	1.4 km	MPC · JPL
269958	2000 SR_{232}	—	September 30, 2000	Socorro	LINEAR	BAR	2.2 km	MPC · JPL
269959	2000 SH_{241}	—	September 23, 2000	Socorro	LINEAR	·	1.8 km	MPC · JPL
269960	2000 SK_{243}	—	September 24, 2000	Socorro	LINEAR	KON	3.6 km	MPC · JPL
269961	2000 SF_{251}	—	September 24, 2000	Socorro	LINEAR	RAF	1.1 km	MPC · JPL
269962	2000 SP_{257}	—	September 24, 2000	Socorro	LINEAR	(5)	1.6 km	MPC · JPL
269963	2000 SE_{259}	—	September 24, 2000	Socorro	LINEAR	·	2.4 km	MPC · JPL
269964	2000 SC_{291}	—	September 27, 2000	Socorro	LINEAR	·	760 m	MPC · JPL
269965	2000 SM_{292}	—	September 27, 2000	Socorro	LINEAR	·	2.1 km	MPC · JPL
269966	2000 SL_{297}	—	September 28, 2000	Socorro	LINEAR	·	1.8 km	MPC · JPL
269967	2000 SB_{309}	—	September 30, 2000	Socorro	LINEAR	·	2.3 km	MPC · JPL
269968	2000 SC_{335}	—	September 26, 2000	Haleakala	NEAT	·	1.5 km	MPC · JPL
269969	2000 SG_{345}	—	September 24, 2000	Socorro	LINEAR	·	2.3 km	MPC · JPL
269970	2000 SH_{359}	—	September 26, 2000	Anderson Mesa	LONEOS	·	1.7 km	MPC · JPL
269971	2000 TQ_{3}	—	October 1, 2000	Socorro	LINEAR	MIS	2.2 km	MPC · JPL
269972	2000 TV_{5}	—	October 1, 2000	Socorro	LINEAR	·	1.9 km	MPC · JPL
269973	2000 TB_{6}	—	October 1, 2000	Socorro	LINEAR	·	2.4 km	MPC · JPL
269974	2000 TU_{7}	—	October 1, 2000	Socorro	LINEAR	·	2.6 km	MPC · JPL
269975	2000 TO_{8}	—	October 1, 2000	Socorro	LINEAR	·	1.9 km	MPC · JPL
269976	2000 TV_{14}	—	October 1, 2000	Socorro	LINEAR	·	1.9 km	MPC · JPL
269977	2000 TK_{22}	—	October 3, 2000	Socorro	LINEAR	·	2.5 km	MPC · JPL
269978	2000 TK_{23}	—	October 1, 2000	Socorro	LINEAR	·	2.3 km	MPC · JPL
269979	2000 TH_{43}	—	October 1, 2000	Socorro	LINEAR	·	1.3 km	MPC · JPL
269980	2000 TK_{52}	—	October 1, 2000	Socorro	LINEAR	·	2.0 km	MPC · JPL
269981	2000 TD_{60}	—	October 2, 2000	Anderson Mesa	LONEOS	EUN	1.9 km	MPC · JPL
269982	2000 TU_{67}	—	October 3, 2000	Socorro	LINEAR	·	1.4 km	MPC · JPL
269983	2000 UH_{29}	—	October 24, 2000	Socorro	LINEAR	·	2.8 km	MPC · JPL
269984	2000 UV_{33}	—	October 24, 2000	Socorro	LINEAR	H	800 m	MPC · JPL
269985	2000 UK_{44}	—	October 24, 2000	Socorro	LINEAR	·	1.9 km	MPC · JPL
269986	2000 UD_{59}	—	October 25, 2000	Socorro	LINEAR	EUN	1.4 km	MPC · JPL
269987	2000 UK_{59}	—	October 25, 2000	Socorro	LINEAR	·	2.3 km	MPC · JPL
269988	2000 UF_{87}	—	October 31, 2000	Socorro	LINEAR	·	2.0 km	MPC · JPL
269989	2000 UX_{97}	—	October 25, 2000	Socorro	LINEAR	·	2.3 km	MPC · JPL
269990	2000 VF_{3}	—	November 2, 2000	Oaxaca	Roe, J. M.	·	2.4 km	MPC · JPL
269991	2000 VB_{29}	—	November 1, 2000	Socorro	LINEAR	EUN	2.0 km	MPC · JPL
269992	2000 VY_{51}	—	November 3, 2000	Socorro	LINEAR	·	2.2 km	MPC · JPL
269993	2000 WJ_{67}	—	November 27, 2000	Socorro	LINEAR	·	940 m	MPC · JPL
269994	2000 WV_{68}	—	November 19, 2000	Socorro	LINEAR	·	3.8 km	MPC · JPL
269995	2000 WV_{79}	—	November 20, 2000	Socorro	LINEAR	·	2.7 km	MPC · JPL
269996	2000 WH_{129}	—	November 19, 2000	Kitt Peak	Spacewatch	·	1.8 km	MPC · JPL
269997	2000 XH_{39}	—	December 4, 2000	Socorro	LINEAR	·	2.1 km	MPC · JPL
269998	2000 XO_{41}	—	December 5, 2000	Socorro	LINEAR	·	3.3 km	MPC · JPL
269999	2000 YG_{6}	—	December 20, 2000	Socorro	LINEAR	·	4.0 km	MPC · JPL
270000	2000 YQ_{19}	—	December 28, 2000	Fair Oaks Ranch	J. V. McClusky	·	2.9 km	MPC · JPL

back to top

== See also ==
- Meanings of minor-planet names: 269001–270000
