= List of minor planets: 272001–273000 =

The following is a partial list of minor planets, running from minor-planet number 272001 through 273000, inclusive. The primary data for this and other partial lists is based on JPL's "Small-Body Orbital Elements" and data available from the Minor Planet Center. Critical list information is also provided by the MPC, unless otherwise specified from Lowell Observatory. A detailed description of the table's columns and additional sources are given on the main page including a complete list of every page in this series, and a statistical break-up on the dynamical classification of minor planets.

Also see the summary list of all named bodies in numerical and alphabetical order, and the corresponding naming citations for the number range of this particular list. New namings may only be added to this list after official publication, as the preannouncement of names is condemned by the Working Group for Small Bodies Nomenclature of the International Astronomical Union.

Near-Earth obj.	MBA (inner)	MBA (outer)	Centaur
Mars-crosser	MBA (middle)	Jupiter trojan	Trans-Neptunian obj.
Unclassified

== 272001–272100 ==
Designation			Discovery			Properties		Ref
Permanent	Provisional	Named after	Date	Site	Discoverer(s)	Category	Diam.	Ref
272001	2005 CO_{49}	—	February 2, 2005	Catalina	CSS	(11097)	3.8 km	MPC · JPL
272002	2005 CN_{50}	—	February 2, 2005	Socorro	LINEAR	·	3.6 km	MPC · JPL
272003	2005 CU_{53}	—	February 4, 2005	Kitt Peak	Spacewatch	TIR	3.9 km	MPC · JPL
272004	2005 CV_{53}	—	February 4, 2005	Socorro	LINEAR	·	3.3 km	MPC · JPL
272005	2005 CW_{58}	—	February 2, 2005	Catalina	CSS	THM	3.3 km	MPC · JPL
272006	2005 CK_{63}	—	February 9, 2005	Anderson Mesa	LONEOS	HYG	3.6 km	MPC · JPL
272007	2005 CT_{63}	—	February 9, 2005	Anderson Mesa	LONEOS	CYB	5.8 km	MPC · JPL
272008	2005 CH_{66}	—	February 9, 2005	Socorro	LINEAR	EOS	2.8 km	MPC · JPL
272009	2005 CN_{69}	—	February 14, 2005	Kitt Peak	Spacewatch	HYG	2.8 km	MPC · JPL
272010	2005 DP	—	February 28, 2005	Junk Bond	Junk Bond	VER	4.9 km	MPC · JPL
272011	2005 DW_{1}	—	February 28, 2005	Goodricke-Pigott	R. A. Tucker	·	5.3 km	MPC · JPL
272012	2005 EW_{6}	—	March 1, 2005	Kitt Peak	Spacewatch	·	3.7 km	MPC · JPL
272013	2005 EB_{7}	—	March 1, 2005	Kitt Peak	Spacewatch	HYG	3.9 km	MPC · JPL
272014	2005 ED_{12}	—	March 2, 2005	Catalina	CSS	·	1.0 km	MPC · JPL
272015	2005 EO_{12}	—	March 2, 2005	Catalina	CSS	·	2.9 km	MPC · JPL
272016	2005 EK_{17}	—	March 3, 2005	Kitt Peak	Spacewatch	HYG	3.4 km	MPC · JPL
272017	2005 EN_{20}	—	March 3, 2005	Catalina	CSS	·	4.6 km	MPC · JPL
272018	2005 ER_{22}	—	March 3, 2005	Catalina	CSS	·	3.0 km	MPC · JPL
272019	2005 EY_{23}	—	March 3, 2005	Catalina	CSS	·	4.7 km	MPC · JPL
272020	2005 EA_{24}	—	March 3, 2005	Catalina	CSS	EOS	2.6 km	MPC · JPL
272021	2005 EV_{25}	—	March 3, 2005	Catalina	CSS	·	900 m	MPC · JPL
272022	2005 EG_{45}	—	March 3, 2005	Catalina	CSS	·	3.2 km	MPC · JPL
272023	2005 EV_{45}	—	March 3, 2005	Catalina	CSS	·	3.2 km	MPC · JPL
272024	2005 ET_{46}	—	March 3, 2005	Catalina	CSS	·	4.0 km	MPC · JPL
272025	2005 EE_{60}	—	March 4, 2005	Catalina	CSS	·	3.6 km	MPC · JPL
272026	2005 EF_{61}	—	March 4, 2005	Catalina	CSS	·	3.0 km	MPC · JPL
272027	2005 EG_{72}	—	March 2, 2005	Catalina	CSS	·	4.2 km	MPC · JPL
272028	2005 EA_{74}	—	March 3, 2005	Kitt Peak	Spacewatch	·	4.1 km	MPC · JPL
272029	2005 EH_{75}	—	March 3, 2005	Kitt Peak	Spacewatch	·	870 m	MPC · JPL
272030	2005 EA_{76}	—	March 3, 2005	Kitt Peak	Spacewatch	·	3.7 km	MPC · JPL
272031	2005 EG_{78}	—	March 3, 2005	Catalina	CSS	·	6.3 km	MPC · JPL
272032	2005 ET_{78}	—	March 3, 2005	Catalina	CSS	VER	3.8 km	MPC · JPL
272033	2005 EB_{81}	—	March 4, 2005	Kitt Peak	Spacewatch	·	3.8 km	MPC · JPL
272034	2005 EG_{82}	—	March 4, 2005	Mount Lemmon	Mount Lemmon Survey	·	2.5 km	MPC · JPL
272035	2005 ED_{83}	—	March 4, 2005	Kitt Peak	Spacewatch	·	5.2 km	MPC · JPL
272036	2005 EU_{83}	—	March 4, 2005	Catalina	CSS	·	1.1 km	MPC · JPL
272037	2005 EC_{84}	—	March 4, 2005	Catalina	CSS	·	3.3 km	MPC · JPL
272038	2005 ER_{86}	—	March 4, 2005	Catalina	CSS	·	4.5 km	MPC · JPL
272039	2005 EW_{86}	—	March 4, 2005	Kitt Peak	Spacewatch	·	4.4 km	MPC · JPL
272040	2005 EW_{89}	—	March 8, 2005	Anderson Mesa	LONEOS	·	3.2 km	MPC · JPL
272041	2005 EM_{91}	—	March 8, 2005	Kitt Peak	Spacewatch	·	3.5 km	MPC · JPL
272042	2005 EP_{94}	—	March 10, 2005	Goodricke-Pigott	R. A. Tucker	EUP	5.3 km	MPC · JPL
272043	2005 EH_{97}	—	March 3, 2005	Catalina	CSS	·	1.1 km	MPC · JPL
272044	2005 EA_{102}	—	March 3, 2005	Catalina	CSS	·	4.4 km	MPC · JPL
272045	2005 EJ_{104}	—	March 4, 2005	Kitt Peak	Spacewatch	VER	3.5 km	MPC · JPL
272046	2005 ET_{110}	—	March 4, 2005	Mount Lemmon	Mount Lemmon Survey	EOS	3.4 km	MPC · JPL
272047	2005 EY_{115}	—	March 4, 2005	Mount Lemmon	Mount Lemmon Survey	·	4.3 km	MPC · JPL
272048	2005 EF_{126}	—	March 8, 2005	Socorro	LINEAR	·	4.6 km	MPC · JPL
272049	2005 EK_{133}	—	March 9, 2005	Catalina	CSS	·	6.2 km	MPC · JPL
272050	2005 EM_{133}	—	March 9, 2005	Catalina	CSS	·	4.9 km	MPC · JPL
272051	2005 EU_{133}	—	March 9, 2005	Socorro	LINEAR	V	770 m	MPC · JPL
272052	2005 EK_{143}	—	March 10, 2005	Mount Lemmon	Mount Lemmon Survey	THM	3.4 km	MPC · JPL
272053	2005 EA_{145}	—	March 10, 2005	Mount Lemmon	Mount Lemmon Survey	EOS	2.7 km	MPC · JPL
272054	2005 EQ_{161}	—	March 9, 2005	Mount Lemmon	Mount Lemmon Survey	THM	3.7 km	MPC · JPL
272055	2005 EG_{171}	—	March 7, 2005	Socorro	LINEAR	·	4.8 km	MPC · JPL
272056	2005 EZ_{172}	—	March 8, 2005	Mount Lemmon	Mount Lemmon Survey	·	2.9 km	MPC · JPL
272057	2005 EV_{174}	—	March 8, 2005	Kitt Peak	Spacewatch	·	4.0 km	MPC · JPL
272058	2005 EB_{176}	—	March 8, 2005	Kitt Peak	Spacewatch	EUP	4.3 km	MPC · JPL
272059	2005 ED_{183}	—	March 9, 2005	Mount Lemmon	Mount Lemmon Survey	VER	3.8 km	MPC · JPL
272060	2005 ED_{186}	—	March 10, 2005	Catalina	CSS	·	6.9 km	MPC · JPL
272061	2005 ES_{192}	—	March 11, 2005	Mount Lemmon	Mount Lemmon Survey	·	3.7 km	MPC · JPL
272062	2005 EC_{196}	—	March 11, 2005	Mount Lemmon	Mount Lemmon Survey	NYS	1.7 km	MPC · JPL
272063	2005 ER_{196}	—	March 11, 2005	Anderson Mesa	LONEOS	TIR	3.4 km	MPC · JPL
272064	2005 EU_{205}	—	March 13, 2005	Mount Lemmon	Mount Lemmon Survey	·	5.2 km	MPC · JPL
272065	2005 EL_{209}	—	March 4, 2005	Catalina	CSS	·	4.6 km	MPC · JPL
272066	2005 EY_{214}	—	March 8, 2005	Anderson Mesa	LONEOS	·	3.8 km	MPC · JPL
272067	2005 EK_{215}	—	March 8, 2005	Kitt Peak	Spacewatch	·	800 m	MPC · JPL
272068	2005 EO_{217}	—	March 9, 2005	Catalina	CSS	·	3.7 km	MPC · JPL
272069	2005 ER_{217}	—	March 9, 2005	Mount Lemmon	Mount Lemmon Survey	·	6.1 km	MPC · JPL
272070	2005 EK_{226}	—	March 9, 2005	Catalina	CSS	EUP	3.5 km	MPC · JPL
272071	2005 ER_{227}	—	March 9, 2005	Socorro	LINEAR	·	3.9 km	MPC · JPL
272072	2005 EQ_{233}	—	March 10, 2005	Anderson Mesa	LONEOS	·	4.0 km	MPC · JPL
272073	2005 EQ_{244}	—	March 11, 2005	Mount Lemmon	Mount Lemmon Survey	VER	3.6 km	MPC · JPL
272074	2005 EQ_{257}	—	March 11, 2005	Mount Lemmon	Mount Lemmon Survey	·	3.3 km	MPC · JPL
272075	2005 EF_{258}	—	March 11, 2005	Mount Lemmon	Mount Lemmon Survey	EOS	2.6 km	MPC · JPL
272076	2005 EP_{263}	—	March 13, 2005	Mount Lemmon	Mount Lemmon Survey	·	3.8 km	MPC · JPL
272077	2005 ER_{266}	—	March 13, 2005	Kitt Peak	Spacewatch	·	3.6 km	MPC · JPL
272078	2005 ES_{282}	—	March 10, 2005	Catalina	CSS	·	4.9 km	MPC · JPL
272079	2005 EW_{286}	—	March 10, 2005	Catalina	CSS	·	5.7 km	MPC · JPL
272080	2005 EH_{287}	—	March 4, 2005	Catalina	CSS	·	6.7 km	MPC · JPL
272081	2005 ER_{288}	—	March 8, 2005	Socorro	LINEAR	LUT	5.6 km	MPC · JPL
272082	2005 EK_{291}	—	March 10, 2005	Catalina	CSS	·	4.4 km	MPC · JPL
272083	2005 EH_{314}	—	March 10, 2005	Mount Lemmon	Mount Lemmon Survey	·	3.7 km	MPC · JPL
272084	2005 EZ_{318}	—	March 9, 2005	Mount Lemmon	Mount Lemmon Survey	·	3.0 km	MPC · JPL
272085	2005 EY_{322}	—	March 4, 2005	Socorro	LINEAR	VER	4.5 km	MPC · JPL
272086	2005 EU_{323}	—	March 3, 2005	Catalina	CSS	·	3.5 km	MPC · JPL
272087	2005 EV_{330}	—	March 2, 2005	Catalina	CSS	·	3.9 km	MPC · JPL
272088	2005 EA_{331}	—	March 3, 2005	Catalina	CSS	·	4.5 km	MPC · JPL
272089	2005 FL_{2}	—	March 17, 2005	Goodricke-Pigott	R. A. Tucker	HYG	4.3 km	MPC · JPL
272090	2005 GE_{1}	—	April 2, 2005	Mayhill	Lowe, A.	·	2.7 km	MPC · JPL
272091	2005 GE_{17}	—	April 2, 2005	Mount Lemmon	Mount Lemmon Survey	HYG	3.5 km	MPC · JPL
272092	2005 GL_{29}	—	April 4, 2005	Catalina	CSS	CYB	3.6 km	MPC · JPL
272093	2005 GK_{33}	—	April 4, 2005	Mount Lemmon	Mount Lemmon Survey	·	3.6 km	MPC · JPL
272094	2005 GX_{37}	—	April 3, 2005	Socorro	LINEAR	·	4.6 km	MPC · JPL
272095	2005 GV_{48}	—	April 5, 2005	Mount Lemmon	Mount Lemmon Survey	·	580 m	MPC · JPL
272096	2005 GV_{63}	—	April 2, 2005	Catalina	CSS	·	4.6 km	MPC · JPL
272097	2005 GY_{69}	—	April 4, 2005	Kitt Peak	Spacewatch	·	3.9 km	MPC · JPL
272098	2005 GH_{114}	—	April 10, 2005	Mount Lemmon	Mount Lemmon Survey	·	3.3 km	MPC · JPL
272099	2005 GE_{120}	—	April 2, 2005	Calvin-Rehoboth	Calvin College	·	3.1 km	MPC · JPL
272100	2005 GW_{144}	—	April 11, 2005	Mount Lemmon	Mount Lemmon Survey	·	4.1 km	MPC · JPL

== 272101–272200 ==
back to top

Designation			Discovery			Properties		Ref
Permanent	Provisional	Named after	Date	Site	Discoverer(s)	Category	Diam.	Ref
272101	2005 GE_{195}	—	April 10, 2005	Kitt Peak	M. W. Buie	·	2.8 km	MPC · JPL
272102	2005 GS_{214}	—	April 6, 2005	Catalina	CSS	·	1.0 km	MPC · JPL
272103	2005 HS_{1}	—	April 16, 2005	Kitt Peak	Spacewatch	·	790 m	MPC · JPL
272104	2005 JF_{24}	—	May 3, 2005	Kitt Peak	Spacewatch	CYB	5.6 km	MPC · JPL
272105	2005 JW_{49}	—	May 4, 2005	Kitt Peak	Spacewatch	·	870 m	MPC · JPL
272106	2005 JJ_{75}	—	May 9, 2005	Catalina	CSS	·	3.9 km	MPC · JPL
272107	2005 JM_{82}	—	May 7, 2005	Mount Lemmon	Mount Lemmon Survey	·	750 m	MPC · JPL
272108	2005 JK_{95}	—	May 8, 2005	Mount Lemmon	Mount Lemmon Survey	·	4.0 km	MPC · JPL
272109	2005 JW_{96}	—	May 8, 2005	Kitt Peak	Spacewatch	·	900 m	MPC · JPL
272110	2005 JK_{102}	—	May 9, 2005	Kitt Peak	Spacewatch	·	1.6 km	MPC · JPL
272111	2005 JM_{123}	—	May 11, 2005	Kitt Peak	Spacewatch	·	720 m	MPC · JPL
272112	2005 JK_{127}	—	May 12, 2005	Mount Lemmon	Mount Lemmon Survey	·	750 m	MPC · JPL
272113	2005 JU_{149}	—	May 3, 2005	Kitt Peak	Spacewatch	·	730 m	MPC · JPL
272114	2005 JU_{185}	—	May 11, 2005	Palomar	NEAT	·	1.8 km	MPC · JPL
272115	2005 KM_{5}	—	May 16, 2005	Kitt Peak	Spacewatch	·	1.5 km	MPC · JPL
272116	2005 KF_{6}	—	May 16, 2005	Palomar	NEAT	·	990 m	MPC · JPL
272117	2005 LE_{10}	—	June 3, 2005	Kitt Peak	Spacewatch	·	1.3 km	MPC · JPL
272118	2005 LT_{25}	—	June 8, 2005	Kitt Peak	Spacewatch	·	1.1 km	MPC · JPL
272119	2005 LM_{33}	—	June 10, 2005	Kitt Peak	Spacewatch	·	1.4 km	MPC · JPL
272120	2005 LX_{33}	—	June 10, 2005	Kitt Peak	Spacewatch	·	740 m	MPC · JPL
272121	2005 LE_{40}	—	June 13, 2005	Mount Lemmon	Mount Lemmon Survey	·	630 m	MPC · JPL
272122	2005 MX_{5}	—	June 21, 2005	Palomar	NEAT	·	1.0 km	MPC · JPL
272123	2005 MZ_{10}	—	June 27, 2005	Kitt Peak	Spacewatch	·	1.3 km	MPC · JPL
272124	2005 MD_{11}	—	June 27, 2005	Kitt Peak	Spacewatch	L4	11 km	MPC · JPL
272125	2005 MT_{21}	—	June 30, 2005	Kitt Peak	Spacewatch	·	1.4 km	MPC · JPL
272126	2005 MP_{25}	—	June 27, 2005	Kitt Peak	Spacewatch	V	850 m	MPC · JPL
272127	2005 MC_{29}	—	June 29, 2005	Kitt Peak	Spacewatch	·	960 m	MPC · JPL
272128	2005 MM_{30}	—	June 29, 2005	Kitt Peak	Spacewatch	ERI	1.9 km	MPC · JPL
272129	2005 ME_{31}	—	June 30, 2005	Kitt Peak	Spacewatch	·	1.0 km	MPC · JPL
272130	2005 MH_{32}	—	June 28, 2005	Palomar	NEAT	·	1.0 km	MPC · JPL
272131	2005 MQ_{34}	—	June 29, 2005	Palomar	NEAT	·	790 m	MPC · JPL
272132	2005 MN_{35}	—	June 30, 2005	Kitt Peak	Spacewatch	fast	1.0 km	MPC · JPL
272133	2005 MY_{39}	—	June 29, 2005	Palomar	NEAT	·	830 m	MPC · JPL
272134	2005 MN_{42}	—	June 29, 2005	Kitt Peak	Spacewatch	·	1.1 km	MPC · JPL
272135	2005 MM_{45}	—	June 27, 2005	Kitt Peak	Spacewatch	·	640 m	MPC · JPL
272136	2005 MA_{46}	—	June 27, 2005	Palomar	NEAT	·	1.0 km	MPC · JPL
272137	2005 MO_{48}	—	June 29, 2005	Kitt Peak	Spacewatch	·	630 m	MPC · JPL
272138	2005 MO_{53}	—	June 17, 2005	Mount Lemmon	Mount Lemmon Survey	·	1.2 km	MPC · JPL
272139	2005 MS_{53}	—	June 17, 2005	Mount Lemmon	Mount Lemmon Survey	NYS	1.4 km	MPC · JPL
272140	2005 MR_{54}	—	June 17, 2005	Mount Lemmon	Mount Lemmon Survey	·	810 m	MPC · JPL
272141	2005 NH_{8}	—	July 1, 2005	Kitt Peak	Spacewatch	·	820 m	MPC · JPL
272142	2005 NP_{8}	—	July 1, 2005	Kitt Peak	Spacewatch	·	700 m	MPC · JPL
272143	2005 NG_{9}	—	July 1, 2005	Kitt Peak	Spacewatch	·	1.3 km	MPC · JPL
272144	2005 NB_{11}	—	July 3, 2005	Mount Lemmon	Mount Lemmon Survey	·	1.1 km	MPC · JPL
272145	2005 NB_{21}	—	July 6, 2005	Reedy Creek	J. Broughton	T_{j} (2.99) · 3:2	8.6 km	MPC · JPL
272146	2005 NX_{21}	—	July 1, 2005	Kitt Peak	Spacewatch	·	880 m	MPC · JPL
272147	2005 NH_{24}	—	July 4, 2005	Kitt Peak	Spacewatch	·	720 m	MPC · JPL
272148	2005 NP_{27}	—	July 5, 2005	Socorro	LINEAR	·	1.1 km	MPC · JPL
272149	2005 NL_{28}	—	July 5, 2005	Palomar	NEAT	NYS	1.2 km	MPC · JPL
272150	2005 NY_{36}	—	July 6, 2005	Kitt Peak	Spacewatch	V	820 m	MPC · JPL
272151	2005 NS_{50}	—	July 5, 2005	Palomar	NEAT	·	950 m	MPC · JPL
272152	2005 NJ_{51}	—	July 7, 2005	Kitt Peak	Spacewatch	NYS	1.2 km	MPC · JPL
272153	2005 NF_{53}	—	July 10, 2005	Kitt Peak	Spacewatch	·	1.1 km	MPC · JPL
272154	2005 NV_{59}	—	July 9, 2005	Kitt Peak	Spacewatch	·	1.7 km	MPC · JPL
272155	2005 NS_{69}	—	July 4, 2005	Palomar	NEAT	V	720 m	MPC · JPL
272156	2005 NJ_{77}	—	July 10, 2005	Kitt Peak	Spacewatch	·	780 m	MPC · JPL
272157	2005 NU_{81}	—	July 12, 2005	Mount Lemmon	Mount Lemmon Survey	V	850 m	MPC · JPL
272158	2005 NX_{87}	—	July 4, 2005	Kitt Peak	Spacewatch	·	1.3 km	MPC · JPL
272159	2005 NC_{91}	—	July 5, 2005	Kitt Peak	Spacewatch	·	1.3 km	MPC · JPL
272160	2005 ND_{95}	—	July 6, 2005	Kitt Peak	Spacewatch	·	560 m	MPC · JPL
272161	2005 NP_{97}	—	July 8, 2005	Kitt Peak	Spacewatch	·	840 m	MPC · JPL
272162	2005 NM_{99}	—	July 10, 2005	Kitt Peak	Spacewatch	·	680 m	MPC · JPL
272163	2005 NB_{117}	—	July 7, 2005	Mauna Kea	Veillet, C.	·	880 m	MPC · JPL
272164	2005 NU_{124}	—	July 12, 2005	Mount Lemmon	Mount Lemmon Survey	·	850 m	MPC · JPL
272165	2005 OA_{1}	—	July 19, 2005	Palomar	NEAT	·	2.0 km	MPC · JPL
272166	2005 OE_{1}	—	July 19, 2005	Palomar	NEAT	·	2.4 km	MPC · JPL
272167	2005 OH_{1}	—	July 19, 2005	Palomar	NEAT	·	2.8 km	MPC · JPL
272168	2005 OS_{3}	—	July 28, 2005	Reedy Creek	J. Broughton	ERI	2.7 km	MPC · JPL
272169	2005 OT_{5}	—	July 28, 2005	Palomar	NEAT	·	1.2 km	MPC · JPL
272170	2005 OA_{7}	—	July 28, 2005	Palomar	NEAT	MAS	930 m	MPC · JPL
272171	2005 OH_{10}	—	July 27, 2005	Palomar	NEAT	·	1.5 km	MPC · JPL
272172	2005 OM_{10}	—	July 27, 2005	Palomar	NEAT	·	750 m	MPC · JPL
272173	2005 OW_{10}	—	July 27, 2005	Palomar	NEAT	V	890 m	MPC · JPL
272174	2005 OU_{11}	—	July 29, 2005	Palomar	NEAT	·	880 m	MPC · JPL
272175	2005 OF_{17}	—	July 30, 2005	Palomar	NEAT	·	940 m	MPC · JPL
272176	2005 OR_{21}	—	July 28, 2005	Palomar	NEAT	V	970 m	MPC · JPL
272177	2005 OO_{23}	—	July 30, 2005	Palomar	NEAT	·	1.0 km	MPC · JPL
272178	2005 OA_{28}	—	July 30, 2005	Palomar	NEAT	·	1.4 km	MPC · JPL
272179	2005 OC_{29}	—	July 30, 2005	Palomar	NEAT	·	1.2 km	MPC · JPL
272180	2005 OS_{31}	—	July 30, 2005	Palomar	NEAT	·	1.5 km	MPC · JPL
272181	2005 PU_{4}	—	August 7, 2005	Siding Spring	SSS	·	1.8 km	MPC · JPL
272182	2005 PT_{6}	—	August 4, 2005	Palomar	NEAT	·	990 m	MPC · JPL
272183	2005 PC_{16}	—	August 4, 2005	Palomar	NEAT	·	950 m	MPC · JPL
272184	2005 PZ_{17}	—	August 12, 2005	Pla D'Arguines	R. Ferrando, Ferrando, M.	·	1.9 km	MPC · JPL
272185	2005 PV_{18}	—	August 11, 2005	Pla D'Arguines	D'Arguines, Pla	(2076)	770 m	MPC · JPL
272186	2005 PX_{19}	—	August 6, 2005	Palomar	NEAT	V	680 m	MPC · JPL
272187	2005 PP_{23}	—	August 8, 2005	Cerro Tololo	M. W. Buie	·	930 m	MPC · JPL
272188	2005 PC_{29}	—	August 6, 2005	Palomar	NEAT	·	990 m	MPC · JPL
272189	2005 QE_{1}	—	August 22, 2005	Palomar	NEAT	·	800 m	MPC · JPL
272190	2005 QY_{1}	—	August 22, 2005	Palomar	NEAT	·	1.2 km	MPC · JPL
272191	2005 QR_{3}	—	August 24, 2005	Palomar	NEAT	·	1.3 km	MPC · JPL
272192	2005 QG_{4}	—	August 24, 2005	Palomar	NEAT	·	980 m	MPC · JPL
272193	2005 QP_{6}	—	August 24, 2005	Palomar	NEAT	·	1.5 km	MPC · JPL
272194	2005 QA_{7}	—	August 24, 2005	Palomar	NEAT	·	1.4 km	MPC · JPL
272195	2005 QS_{7}	—	August 24, 2005	Palomar	NEAT	·	990 m	MPC · JPL
272196	2005 QB_{9}	—	August 25, 2005	Palomar	NEAT	·	1.4 km	MPC · JPL
272197	2005 QF_{9}	—	August 25, 2005	Palomar	NEAT	MAS	880 m	MPC · JPL
272198	2005 QC_{15}	—	August 25, 2005	Palomar	NEAT	NYS	1.4 km	MPC · JPL
272199	2005 QA_{16}	—	August 25, 2005	Palomar	NEAT	·	1.7 km	MPC · JPL
272200	2005 QO_{17}	—	August 25, 2005	Palomar	NEAT	·	980 m	MPC · JPL

== 272201–272300 ==
back to top

Designation			Discovery			Properties		Ref
Permanent	Provisional	Named after	Date	Site	Discoverer(s)	Category	Diam.	Ref
272201	2005 QT_{17}	—	August 25, 2005	Palomar	NEAT	NYS · fast	1.4 km	MPC · JPL
272202	2005 QU_{17}	—	August 25, 2005	Palomar	NEAT	·	2.2 km	MPC · JPL
272203	2005 QZ_{20}	—	August 26, 2005	Haleakala	NEAT	·	1.8 km	MPC · JPL
272204	2005 QK_{21}	—	August 26, 2005	Anderson Mesa	LONEOS	·	1.1 km	MPC · JPL
272205	2005 QZ_{21}	—	August 27, 2005	Kitt Peak	Spacewatch	·	900 m	MPC · JPL
272206	2005 QH_{23}	—	August 27, 2005	Anderson Mesa	LONEOS	·	1.4 km	MPC · JPL
272207	2005 QM_{24}	—	August 27, 2005	Kitt Peak	Spacewatch	·	1.7 km	MPC · JPL
272208	2005 QF_{26}	—	August 27, 2005	Kitt Peak	Spacewatch	·	1.0 km	MPC · JPL
272209 Corsica	2005 QM_{28}	Corsica	August 28, 2005	Vicques	M. Ory	(2076)	940 m	MPC · JPL
272210	2005 QC_{31}	—	August 22, 2005	Palomar	NEAT	3:2	6.9 km	MPC · JPL
272211	2005 QF_{35}	—	August 25, 2005	Palomar	NEAT	·	970 m	MPC · JPL
272212	2005 QP_{35}	—	August 25, 2005	Palomar	NEAT	NYS	1.3 km	MPC · JPL
272213	2005 QG_{38}	—	August 25, 2005	Palomar	NEAT	·	900 m	MPC · JPL
272214	2005 QD_{42}	—	August 26, 2005	Anderson Mesa	LONEOS	V	1.0 km	MPC · JPL
272215	2005 QN_{42}	—	August 26, 2005	Haleakala	NEAT	·	1.1 km	MPC · JPL
272216	2005 QW_{45}	—	August 26, 2005	Palomar	NEAT	·	1.3 km	MPC · JPL
272217	2005 QC_{46}	—	August 26, 2005	Palomar	NEAT	·	1.2 km	MPC · JPL
272218	2005 QG_{48}	—	August 26, 2005	Palomar	NEAT	V	940 m	MPC · JPL
272219	2005 QJ_{58}	—	August 25, 2005	Palomar	NEAT	V	850 m	MPC · JPL
272220	2005 QN_{58}	—	August 25, 2005	Palomar	NEAT	NYS	1.3 km	MPC · JPL
272221	2005 QT_{60}	—	August 26, 2005	Anderson Mesa	LONEOS	·	1.1 km	MPC · JPL
272222	2005 QM_{66}	—	August 27, 2005	Kitt Peak	Spacewatch	·	1.3 km	MPC · JPL
272223	2005 QO_{70}	—	August 29, 2005	Socorro	LINEAR	·	1.0 km	MPC · JPL
272224	2005 QW_{70}	—	August 29, 2005	Socorro	LINEAR	V	900 m	MPC · JPL
272225	2005 QV_{72}	—	August 29, 2005	Kitt Peak	Spacewatch	·	900 m	MPC · JPL
272226	2005 QB_{74}	—	August 29, 2005	Anderson Mesa	LONEOS	·	2.0 km	MPC · JPL
272227	2005 QE_{74}	—	August 29, 2005	Anderson Mesa	LONEOS	T_{j} (2.98) · HIL · 3:2	9.3 km	MPC · JPL
272228	2005 QK_{74}	—	August 29, 2005	Anderson Mesa	LONEOS	·	1.3 km	MPC · JPL
272229	2005 QH_{77}	—	August 24, 2005	Palomar	NEAT	·	1.3 km	MPC · JPL
272230	2005 QX_{87}	—	August 28, 2005	Bergisch Gladbach	W. Bickel	V	680 m	MPC · JPL
272231	2005 QL_{89}	—	August 22, 2005	Palomar	NEAT	·	1.6 km	MPC · JPL
272232	2005 QJ_{101}	—	August 27, 2005	Palomar	NEAT	V	950 m	MPC · JPL
272233	2005 QV_{104}	—	August 27, 2005	Palomar	NEAT	·	1.6 km	MPC · JPL
272234	2005 QX_{112}	—	August 27, 2005	Palomar	NEAT	·	1.4 km	MPC · JPL
272235	2005 QG_{114}	—	August 27, 2005	Palomar	NEAT	·	1.3 km	MPC · JPL
272236	2005 QS_{114}	—	August 27, 2005	Palomar	NEAT	·	900 m	MPC · JPL
272237	2005 QW_{114}	—	August 27, 2005	Palomar	NEAT	·	1.5 km	MPC · JPL
272238	2005 QQ_{116}	—	August 28, 2005	Kitt Peak	Spacewatch	NYS	1.2 km	MPC · JPL
272239	2005 QG_{121}	—	August 28, 2005	Kitt Peak	Spacewatch	·	1.3 km	MPC · JPL
272240	2005 QQ_{121}	—	August 28, 2005	Kitt Peak	Spacewatch	·	1.2 km	MPC · JPL
272241	2005 QC_{123}	—	August 28, 2005	Kitt Peak	Spacewatch	·	2.0 km	MPC · JPL
272242	2005 QN_{123}	—	August 28, 2005	Kitt Peak	Spacewatch	·	1.1 km	MPC · JPL
272243	2005 QU_{123}	—	August 28, 2005	Kitt Peak	Spacewatch	V	620 m	MPC · JPL
272244	2005 QH_{124}	—	August 28, 2005	Kitt Peak	Spacewatch	V	790 m	MPC · JPL
272245	2005 QO_{125}	—	August 28, 2005	Kitt Peak	Spacewatch	MAS	840 m	MPC · JPL
272246	2005 QM_{127}	—	August 28, 2005	Kitt Peak	Spacewatch	·	880 m	MPC · JPL
272247	2005 QF_{131}	—	August 28, 2005	Kitt Peak	Spacewatch	NYS	1.7 km	MPC · JPL
272248	2005 QQ_{135}	—	August 28, 2005	Kitt Peak	Spacewatch	·	880 m	MPC · JPL
272249	2005 QL_{136}	—	August 28, 2005	Kitt Peak	Spacewatch	·	1.8 km	MPC · JPL
272250	2005 QX_{136}	—	August 28, 2005	Kitt Peak	Spacewatch	(5)	1.3 km	MPC · JPL
272251	2005 QE_{138}	—	August 28, 2005	Kitt Peak	Spacewatch	·	910 m	MPC · JPL
272252	2005 QJ_{139}	—	August 28, 2005	Kitt Peak	Spacewatch	NYS	1.5 km	MPC · JPL
272253	2005 QA_{145}	—	August 27, 2005	Palomar	NEAT	·	1.1 km	MPC · JPL
272254	2005 QJ_{145}	—	August 27, 2005	Anderson Mesa	LONEOS	·	1.2 km	MPC · JPL
272255	2005 QR_{147}	—	August 28, 2005	Siding Spring	SSS	·	1.5 km	MPC · JPL
272256	2005 QR_{150}	—	August 30, 2005	Kitt Peak	Spacewatch	·	1.5 km	MPC · JPL
272257	2005 QX_{150}	—	August 30, 2005	Kitt Peak	Spacewatch	V	740 m	MPC · JPL
272258	2005 QG_{152}	—	August 31, 2005	Kitt Peak	Spacewatch	V	880 m	MPC · JPL
272259	2005 QD_{162}	—	August 28, 2005	Siding Spring	SSS	·	900 m	MPC · JPL
272260	2005 QO_{165}	—	August 31, 2005	Palomar	NEAT	·	1.2 km	MPC · JPL
272261	2005 QZ_{168}	—	August 29, 2005	Palomar	NEAT	·	1.4 km	MPC · JPL
272262	2005 QJ_{172}	—	August 29, 2005	Palomar	NEAT	·	1.4 km	MPC · JPL
272263	2005 QU_{172}	—	August 29, 2005	Palomar	NEAT	·	1.5 km	MPC · JPL
272264	2005 QR_{177}	—	August 30, 2005	Kitt Peak	Spacewatch	V	690 m	MPC · JPL
272265	2005 QP_{182}	—	August 30, 2005	Kitt Peak	Spacewatch	V	620 m	MPC · JPL
272266	2005 QW_{182}	—	August 27, 2005	Anderson Mesa	LONEOS	·	1.4 km	MPC · JPL
272267	2005 QF_{188}	—	August 30, 2005	Kitt Peak	Spacewatch	V	730 m	MPC · JPL
272268	2005 QF_{190}	—	August 31, 2005	Kitt Peak	Spacewatch	·	1.2 km	MPC · JPL
272269	2005 RS_{2}	—	September 2, 2005	Campo Imperatore	CINEOS	·	1.0 km	MPC · JPL
272270	2005 RQ_{3}	—	September 5, 2005	Altschwendt	Altschwendt	·	1.4 km	MPC · JPL
272271	2005 RM_{7}	—	September 8, 2005	Socorro	LINEAR	·	1.4 km	MPC · JPL
272272	2005 RA_{8}	—	September 8, 2005	Socorro	LINEAR	·	1.8 km	MPC · JPL
272273	2005 RO_{8}	—	September 8, 2005	Socorro	LINEAR	·	900 m	MPC · JPL
272274	2005 RP_{8}	—	September 8, 2005	Socorro	LINEAR	NYS ·	1.4 km	MPC · JPL
272275	2005 RX_{8}	—	September 8, 2005	Socorro	LINEAR	·	1.7 km	MPC · JPL
272276	2005 RZ_{8}	—	September 8, 2005	Socorro	LINEAR	·	1.1 km	MPC · JPL
272277	2005 RH_{22}	—	September 8, 2005	Socorro	LINEAR	·	1.5 km	MPC · JPL
272278	2005 RT_{26}	—	September 8, 2005	Socorro	LINEAR	·	2.9 km	MPC · JPL
272279	2005 RX_{39}	—	September 12, 2005	Socorro	LINEAR	·	3.0 km	MPC · JPL
272280	2005 RM_{41}	—	September 13, 2005	Kitt Peak	Spacewatch	HOF	3.9 km	MPC · JPL
272281	2005 RW_{43}	—	September 3, 2005	Palomar	NEAT	·	1.4 km	MPC · JPL
272282	2005 SX	—	September 22, 2005	Siding Spring	R. H. McNaught	V	990 m	MPC · JPL
272283	2005 SG_{3}	—	September 23, 2005	Catalina	CSS	·	1.3 km	MPC · JPL
272284	2005 SE_{6}	—	September 23, 2005	Kitt Peak	Spacewatch	·	1.4 km	MPC · JPL
272285	2005 SN_{6}	—	September 23, 2005	Kitt Peak	Spacewatch	·	1.2 km	MPC · JPL
272286	2005 SH_{7}	—	September 24, 2005	Kitt Peak	Spacewatch	·	980 m	MPC · JPL
272287	2005 ST_{9}	—	September 25, 2005	Catalina	CSS	·	1.8 km	MPC · JPL
272288	2005 SW_{10}	—	September 23, 2005	Kitt Peak	Spacewatch	·	1.2 km	MPC · JPL
272289	2005 SM_{13}	—	September 24, 2005	Kitt Peak	Spacewatch	·	870 m	MPC · JPL
272290	2005 SY_{13}	—	September 24, 2005	Kitt Peak	Spacewatch	·	1.8 km	MPC · JPL
272291	2005 SG_{14}	—	September 24, 2005	Anderson Mesa	LONEOS	·	1.5 km	MPC · JPL
272292	2005 SN_{17}	—	September 26, 2005	Kitt Peak	Spacewatch	MAS	790 m	MPC · JPL
272293	2005 SU_{20}	—	September 25, 2005	Kitt Peak	Spacewatch	NYS	1.7 km	MPC · JPL
272294	2005 SA_{21}	—	September 25, 2005	Kitt Peak	Spacewatch	·	1.3 km	MPC · JPL
272295	2005 SP_{21}	—	September 21, 2005	Palomar	NEAT	PHO	1.6 km	MPC · JPL
272296	2005 SU_{21}	—	September 24, 2005	Kitt Peak	Spacewatch	V	1.1 km	MPC · JPL
272297	2005 SN_{24}	—	September 24, 2005	Anderson Mesa	LONEOS	T_{j} (2.96) · 3:2	7.6 km	MPC · JPL
272298	2005 SR_{24}	—	September 24, 2005	Anderson Mesa	LONEOS	·	1.0 km	MPC · JPL
272299	2005 SD_{25}	—	September 25, 2005	Catalina	CSS	·	1.1 km	MPC · JPL
272300	2005 SS_{27}	—	September 23, 2005	Kitt Peak	Spacewatch	·	1.8 km	MPC · JPL

== 272301–272400 ==
back to top

Designation			Discovery			Properties		Ref
Permanent	Provisional	Named after	Date	Site	Discoverer(s)	Category	Diam.	Ref
272301	2005 SA_{28}	—	September 23, 2005	Kitt Peak	Spacewatch	·	1.7 km	MPC · JPL
272302	2005 SW_{30}	—	September 23, 2005	Catalina	CSS	·	940 m	MPC · JPL
272303	2005 SE_{31}	—	September 23, 2005	Catalina	CSS	·	1.1 km	MPC · JPL
272304	2005 SE_{33}	—	September 23, 2005	Catalina	CSS	V	770 m	MPC · JPL
272305	2005 SJ_{33}	—	September 23, 2005	Kitt Peak	Spacewatch	·	1.1 km	MPC · JPL
272306	2005 SM_{33}	—	September 23, 2005	Kitt Peak	Spacewatch	·	1.4 km	MPC · JPL
272307	2005 SV_{33}	—	September 23, 2005	Kitt Peak	Spacewatch	·	1.4 km	MPC · JPL
272308	2005 SO_{44}	—	September 24, 2005	Kitt Peak	Spacewatch	·	1.2 km	MPC · JPL
272309	2005 SO_{53}	—	September 25, 2005	Kitt Peak	Spacewatch	·	1.7 km	MPC · JPL
272310	2005 SE_{57}	—	September 26, 2005	Kitt Peak	Spacewatch	·	1.3 km	MPC · JPL
272311	2005 SK_{59}	—	September 26, 2005	Kitt Peak	Spacewatch	·	2.1 km	MPC · JPL
272312	2005 SE_{60}	—	September 26, 2005	Kitt Peak	Spacewatch	·	970 m	MPC · JPL
272313	2005 SZ_{65}	—	September 26, 2005	Catalina	CSS	·	2.3 km	MPC · JPL
272314	2005 SQ_{69}	—	September 27, 2005	Kitt Peak	Spacewatch	MAS	1.0 km	MPC · JPL
272315	2005 SX_{69}	—	September 27, 2005	Socorro	LINEAR	·	1.8 km	MPC · JPL
272316	2005 SW_{70}	—	September 27, 2005	Junk Bond	D. Healy	·	1.4 km	MPC · JPL
272317	2005 SR_{71}	—	September 23, 2005	Catalina	CSS	·	810 m	MPC · JPL
272318	2005 SL_{72}	—	September 23, 2005	Catalina	CSS	NYS	1.6 km	MPC · JPL
272319	2005 SJ_{73}	—	September 23, 2005	Kitt Peak	Spacewatch	MAS	850 m	MPC · JPL
272320	2005 SY_{75}	—	September 24, 2005	Kitt Peak	Spacewatch	V	810 m	MPC · JPL
272321	2005 SA_{82}	—	September 24, 2005	Kitt Peak	Spacewatch	·	820 m	MPC · JPL
272322	2005 SK_{83}	—	September 24, 2005	Kitt Peak	Spacewatch	·	1.4 km	MPC · JPL
272323	2005 SY_{85}	—	September 24, 2005	Kitt Peak	Spacewatch	·	710 m	MPC · JPL
272324	2005 SJ_{88}	—	September 24, 2005	Kitt Peak	Spacewatch	·	1.0 km	MPC · JPL
272325	2005 ST_{90}	—	September 24, 2005	Kitt Peak	Spacewatch	·	1.3 km	MPC · JPL
272326	2005 ST_{91}	—	September 24, 2005	Kitt Peak	Spacewatch	MAS	720 m	MPC · JPL
272327	2005 SR_{94}	—	September 25, 2005	Palomar	NEAT	PHO	2.0 km	MPC · JPL
272328	2005 SQ_{97}	—	September 25, 2005	Palomar	NEAT	·	1.1 km	MPC · JPL
272329	2005 SZ_{100}	—	September 25, 2005	Kitt Peak	Spacewatch	·	1.3 km	MPC · JPL
272330	2005 SK_{104}	—	September 25, 2005	Kitt Peak	Spacewatch	·	1.5 km	MPC · JPL
272331	2005 ST_{106}	—	September 26, 2005	Kitt Peak	Spacewatch	·	900 m	MPC · JPL
272332	2005 SD_{110}	—	September 26, 2005	Kitt Peak	Spacewatch	·	1.7 km	MPC · JPL
272333	2005 SV_{112}	—	September 26, 2005	Palomar	NEAT	·	1.2 km	MPC · JPL
272334	2005 SC_{114}	—	September 27, 2005	Kitt Peak	Spacewatch	·	1.3 km	MPC · JPL
272335	2005 SC_{117}	—	September 28, 2005	Palomar	NEAT	·	1.9 km	MPC · JPL
272336	2005 SH_{117}	—	September 28, 2005	Palomar	NEAT	·	1.5 km	MPC · JPL
272337	2005 SV_{117}	—	September 28, 2005	Palomar	NEAT	·	1.5 km	MPC · JPL
272338	2005 SX_{118}	—	September 28, 2005	Palomar	NEAT	V	720 m	MPC · JPL
272339	2005 SS_{121}	—	September 29, 2005	Anderson Mesa	LONEOS	·	1.1 km	MPC · JPL
272340	2005 SZ_{123}	—	September 29, 2005	Anderson Mesa	LONEOS	·	1.1 km	MPC · JPL
272341	2005 SD_{125}	—	September 29, 2005	Palomar	NEAT	·	960 m	MPC · JPL
272342	2005 SF_{125}	—	September 29, 2005	Palomar	NEAT	·	1.1 km	MPC · JPL
272343	2005 SX_{125}	—	September 29, 2005	Palomar	NEAT	NYS	1.4 km	MPC · JPL
272344	2005 SA_{127}	—	September 29, 2005	Mount Lemmon	Mount Lemmon Survey	NYS	1.3 km	MPC · JPL
272345	2005 SP_{134}	—	September 30, 2005	Junk Bond	D. Healy	·	1.2 km	MPC · JPL
272346	2005 SQ_{139}	—	September 25, 2005	Kitt Peak	Spacewatch	·	870 m	MPC · JPL
272347	2005 SU_{145}	—	September 25, 2005	Kitt Peak	Spacewatch	·	1.3 km	MPC · JPL
272348	2005 SJ_{146}	—	September 25, 2005	Kitt Peak	Spacewatch	V	950 m	MPC · JPL
272349	2005 SA_{148}	—	September 25, 2005	Kitt Peak	Spacewatch	·	1.4 km	MPC · JPL
272350	2005 SA_{150}	—	September 25, 2005	Kitt Peak	Spacewatch	·	2.0 km	MPC · JPL
272351	2005 SA_{152}	—	September 25, 2005	Kitt Peak	Spacewatch	·	1.3 km	MPC · JPL
272352	2005 SF_{153}	—	September 25, 2005	Kitt Peak	Spacewatch	·	1.9 km	MPC · JPL
272353	2005 ST_{162}	—	September 27, 2005	Kitt Peak	Spacewatch	·	1.5 km	MPC · JPL
272354	2005 SH_{164}	—	September 27, 2005	Palomar	NEAT	·	1.9 km	MPC · JPL
272355	2005 SS_{164}	—	September 27, 2005	Palomar	NEAT	·	2.6 km	MPC · JPL
272356	2005 SC_{165}	—	September 28, 2005	Palomar	NEAT	NYS	1.0 km	MPC · JPL
272357	2005 ST_{165}	—	September 28, 2005	Palomar	NEAT	·	1.7 km	MPC · JPL
272358	2005 SZ_{166}	—	September 28, 2005	Palomar	NEAT	PHO	3.0 km	MPC · JPL
272359	2005 SO_{168}	—	September 29, 2005	Kitt Peak	Spacewatch	·	1.7 km	MPC · JPL
272360	2005 SB_{171}	—	September 29, 2005	Kitt Peak	Spacewatch	V	760 m	MPC · JPL
272361	2005 SF_{177}	—	September 29, 2005	Kitt Peak	Spacewatch	·	2.0 km	MPC · JPL
272362	2005 SY_{179}	—	September 29, 2005	Anderson Mesa	LONEOS	NYS	1.6 km	MPC · JPL
272363	2005 SD_{193}	—	September 29, 2005	Kitt Peak	Spacewatch	·	1.3 km	MPC · JPL
272364	2005 SZ_{198}	—	September 30, 2005	Kitt Peak	Spacewatch	NYS	1.1 km	MPC · JPL
272365	2005 SF_{200}	—	September 30, 2005	Kitt Peak	Spacewatch	·	1.2 km	MPC · JPL
272366	2005 SX_{201}	—	September 30, 2005	Mount Lemmon	Mount Lemmon Survey	·	1.4 km	MPC · JPL
272367	2005 SZ_{202}	—	September 30, 2005	Palomar	NEAT	·	1.2 km	MPC · JPL
272368	2005 SU_{203}	—	September 30, 2005	Anderson Mesa	LONEOS	NYS	960 m	MPC · JPL
272369	2005 SD_{208}	—	September 30, 2005	Kitt Peak	Spacewatch	·	860 m	MPC · JPL
272370	2005 SF_{210}	—	September 30, 2005	Palomar	NEAT	·	1.6 km	MPC · JPL
272371	2005 SS_{212}	—	September 30, 2005	Mount Lemmon	Mount Lemmon Survey	·	1.0 km	MPC · JPL
272372	2005 SG_{215}	—	September 30, 2005	Anderson Mesa	LONEOS	·	1.7 km	MPC · JPL
272373	2005 SA_{217}	—	September 30, 2005	Palomar	NEAT	·	1 km	MPC · JPL
272374	2005 SC_{217}	—	September 30, 2005	Mount Lemmon	Mount Lemmon Survey	·	2.7 km	MPC · JPL
272375	2005 SZ_{217}	—	September 30, 2005	Mount Lemmon	Mount Lemmon Survey	·	1.4 km	MPC · JPL
272376	2005 SN_{218}	—	September 30, 2005	Palomar	NEAT	·	1.4 km	MPC · JPL
272377	2005 SH_{220}	—	September 29, 2005	Catalina	CSS	·	2.5 km	MPC · JPL
272378	2005 SQ_{220}	—	September 29, 2005	Catalina	CSS	slow	2.2 km	MPC · JPL
272379	2005 SH_{221}	—	September 30, 2005	Mount Lemmon	Mount Lemmon Survey	·	1.6 km	MPC · JPL
272380	2005 SL_{224}	—	September 29, 2005	Mount Lemmon	Mount Lemmon Survey	MAS	820 m	MPC · JPL
272381	2005 SH_{226}	—	September 30, 2005	Kitt Peak	Spacewatch	·	880 m	MPC · JPL
272382	2005 SL_{227}	—	September 30, 2005	Kitt Peak	Spacewatch	·	1.1 km	MPC · JPL
272383	2005 SN_{231}	—	September 30, 2005	Mount Lemmon	Mount Lemmon Survey	V	720 m	MPC · JPL
272384	2005 SY_{237}	—	September 29, 2005	Kitt Peak	Spacewatch	·	1.1 km	MPC · JPL
272385	2005 SM_{254}	—	September 22, 2005	Palomar	NEAT	NYS	1.7 km	MPC · JPL
272386	2005 SN_{254}	—	September 22, 2005	Palomar	NEAT	MAS	910 m	MPC · JPL
272387	2005 SL_{257}	—	September 22, 2005	Palomar	NEAT	V	830 m	MPC · JPL
272388	2005 SW_{269}	—	September 29, 2005	Kitt Peak	Spacewatch	·	1.3 km	MPC · JPL
272389	2005 SY_{269}	—	September 29, 2005	Catalina	CSS	·	1.7 km	MPC · JPL
272390	2005 SZ_{270}	—	September 30, 2005	Anderson Mesa	LONEOS	·	2.1 km	MPC · JPL
272391	2005 SF_{281}	—	September 30, 2005	Palomar	NEAT	·	1.1 km	MPC · JPL
272392	2005 SA_{284}	—	September 24, 2005	Apache Point	A. C. Becker	·	1.1 km	MPC · JPL
272393	2005 SH_{288}	—	September 27, 2005	Apache Point	A. C. Becker	(5)	1.5 km	MPC · JPL
272394	2005 SS_{288}	—	September 27, 2005	Apache Point	A. C. Becker	·	1.4 km	MPC · JPL
272395	2005 SS_{289}	—	September 29, 2005	Kitt Peak	Spacewatch	·	1.3 km	MPC · JPL
272396	2005 SX_{292}	—	September 30, 2005	Kitt Peak	Spacewatch	·	2.6 km	MPC · JPL
272397	2005 TF_{1}	—	October 1, 2005	Catalina	CSS	·	1.4 km	MPC · JPL
272398	2005 TF_{2}	—	October 1, 2005	Catalina	CSS	·	960 m	MPC · JPL
272399	2005 TW_{5}	—	October 1, 2005	Catalina	CSS	·	2.0 km	MPC · JPL
272400	2005 TU_{6}	—	October 1, 2005	Catalina	CSS	·	1.4 km	MPC · JPL

== 272401–272500 ==
back to top

Designation			Discovery			Properties		Ref
Permanent	Provisional	Named after	Date	Site	Discoverer(s)	Category	Diam.	Ref
272401	2005 TD_{14}	—	October 1, 2005	Catalina	CSS	·	1.2 km	MPC · JPL
272402	2005 TU_{16}	—	October 1, 2005	Kitt Peak	Spacewatch	·	720 m	MPC · JPL
272403	2005 TP_{21}	—	October 1, 2005	Kitt Peak	Spacewatch	NYS	1.3 km	MPC · JPL
272404	2005 TM_{25}	—	October 1, 2005	Mount Lemmon	Mount Lemmon Survey	·	1.3 km	MPC · JPL
272405	2005 TX_{25}	—	October 1, 2005	Mount Lemmon	Mount Lemmon Survey	·	1.5 km	MPC · JPL
272406	2005 TH_{27}	—	October 1, 2005	Mount Lemmon	Mount Lemmon Survey	·	1.1 km	MPC · JPL
272407	2005 TB_{33}	—	October 1, 2005	Kitt Peak	Spacewatch	·	1.4 km	MPC · JPL
272408	2005 TV_{35}	—	October 1, 2005	Kitt Peak	Spacewatch	·	1.2 km	MPC · JPL
272409	2005 TM_{36}	—	October 1, 2005	Mount Lemmon	Mount Lemmon Survey	·	1.4 km	MPC · JPL
272410	2005 TF_{40}	—	October 1, 2005	Kitt Peak	Spacewatch	V	820 m	MPC · JPL
272411	2005 TL_{42}	—	October 3, 2005	Kitt Peak	Spacewatch	·	1.5 km	MPC · JPL
272412	2005 TY_{50}	—	October 10, 2005	Catalina	CSS	·	1.9 km	MPC · JPL
272413	2005 TM_{56}	—	October 1, 2005	Mount Lemmon	Mount Lemmon Survey	·	1.2 km	MPC · JPL
272414	2005 TT_{57}	—	October 1, 2005	Mount Lemmon	Mount Lemmon Survey	NYS	1.7 km	MPC · JPL
272415	2005 TY_{64}	—	October 1, 2005	Kitt Peak	Spacewatch	MAS	760 m	MPC · JPL
272416	2005 TT_{73}	—	October 7, 2005	Anderson Mesa	LONEOS	·	1 km	MPC · JPL
272417	2005 TD_{76}	—	October 5, 2005	Catalina	CSS	T_{j} (2.96) · HIL · 3:2	9.0 km	MPC · JPL
272418	2005 TA_{98}	—	October 6, 2005	Mount Lemmon	Mount Lemmon Survey	·	1.4 km	MPC · JPL
272419	2005 TF_{101}	—	October 7, 2005	Catalina	CSS	·	1.7 km	MPC · JPL
272420	2005 TQ_{103}	—	October 8, 2005	Socorro	LINEAR	·	1.6 km	MPC · JPL
272421	2005 TF_{105}	—	October 8, 2005	Socorro	LINEAR	·	1.6 km	MPC · JPL
272422	2005 TG_{107}	—	October 4, 2005	Mount Lemmon	Mount Lemmon Survey	MAS	890 m	MPC · JPL
272423	2005 TE_{117}	—	October 7, 2005	Kitt Peak	Spacewatch	·	1.4 km	MPC · JPL
272424	2005 TK_{117}	—	October 7, 2005	Mount Lemmon	Mount Lemmon Survey	·	1.6 km	MPC · JPL
272425	2005 TH_{123}	—	October 7, 2005	Kitt Peak	Spacewatch	·	830 m	MPC · JPL
272426	2005 TM_{131}	—	October 7, 2005	Kitt Peak	Spacewatch	·	1.7 km	MPC · JPL
272427	2005 TQ_{136}	—	October 6, 2005	Kitt Peak	Spacewatch	·	1.4 km	MPC · JPL
272428	2005 TH_{151}	—	October 8, 2005	Kitt Peak	Spacewatch	NYS	1.4 km	MPC · JPL
272429	2005 TK_{152}	—	October 11, 2005	Kitt Peak	Spacewatch	·	2.1 km	MPC · JPL
272430	2005 TM_{152}	—	October 11, 2005	Kitt Peak	Spacewatch	·	2.6 km	MPC · JPL
272431	2005 TD_{154}	—	October 8, 2005	Catalina	CSS	·	1.2 km	MPC · JPL
272432	2005 TD_{156}	—	October 9, 2005	Kitt Peak	Spacewatch	V	790 m	MPC · JPL
272433	2005 TP_{167}	—	October 9, 2005	Kitt Peak	Spacewatch	·	1.6 km	MPC · JPL
272434	2005 TW_{167}	—	October 9, 2005	Kitt Peak	Spacewatch	MAS	1.1 km	MPC · JPL
272435	2005 TN_{171}	—	October 10, 2005	Anderson Mesa	LONEOS	EOS	2.5 km	MPC · JPL
272436	2005 TG_{174}	—	October 12, 2005	Kitt Peak	Spacewatch	·	1.5 km	MPC · JPL
272437	2005 TU_{176}	—	October 1, 2005	Anderson Mesa	LONEOS	V	880 m	MPC · JPL
272438	2005 TM_{178}	—	October 1, 2005	Kitt Peak	Spacewatch	·	920 m	MPC · JPL
272439	2005 TJ_{188}	—	October 9, 2005	Kitt Peak	Spacewatch	·	1.5 km	MPC · JPL
272440	2005 UA	—	October 20, 2005	Palomar	NEAT	·	1.8 km	MPC · JPL
272441	2005 UR_{1}	—	October 22, 2005	Junk Bond	D. Healy	·	2.2 km	MPC · JPL
272442	2005 UR_{9}	—	October 21, 2005	Palomar	NEAT	V	800 m	MPC · JPL
272443	2005 UZ_{10}	—	October 22, 2005	Kitt Peak	Spacewatch	(5)	1.1 km	MPC · JPL
272444	2005 UM_{12}	—	October 23, 2005	Kitt Peak	Spacewatch	·	1.4 km	MPC · JPL
272445	2005 UX_{12}	—	October 22, 2005	Kitt Peak	Spacewatch	·	1.3 km	MPC · JPL
272446	2005 UQ_{13}	—	October 22, 2005	Kitt Peak	Spacewatch	MAS	740 m	MPC · JPL
272447	2005 UQ_{17}	—	October 22, 2005	Kitt Peak	Spacewatch	·	5.5 km	MPC · JPL
272448	2005 UP_{21}	—	October 23, 2005	Kitt Peak	Spacewatch	·	900 m	MPC · JPL
272449	2005 UW_{21}	—	October 23, 2005	Kitt Peak	Spacewatch	·	1.8 km	MPC · JPL
272450	2005 UG_{22}	—	October 23, 2005	Kitt Peak	Spacewatch	·	960 m	MPC · JPL
272451	2005 UY_{29}	—	October 1, 2000	Socorro	LINEAR	KOR	2.0 km	MPC · JPL
272452	2005 UO_{34}	—	October 24, 2005	Kitt Peak	Spacewatch	·	1.9 km	MPC · JPL
272453	2005 UV_{39}	—	October 24, 2005	Kitt Peak	Spacewatch	MAS	800 m	MPC · JPL
272454	2005 UV_{40}	—	October 24, 2005	Kitt Peak	Spacewatch	(5)	1.4 km	MPC · JPL
272455	2005 UA_{50}	—	October 23, 2005	Catalina	CSS	PHO	1.2 km	MPC · JPL
272456	2005 US_{51}	—	October 23, 2005	Catalina	CSS	·	1.8 km	MPC · JPL
272457	2005 UP_{52}	—	October 23, 2005	Catalina	CSS	·	1.4 km	MPC · JPL
272458	2005 UE_{54}	—	October 23, 2005	Catalina	CSS	·	1.4 km	MPC · JPL
272459	2005 UP_{54}	—	October 23, 2005	Catalina	CSS	fast	1.8 km	MPC · JPL
272460	2005 UQ_{54}	—	October 23, 2005	Catalina	CSS	V	970 m	MPC · JPL
272461	2005 UP_{55}	—	October 23, 2005	Catalina	CSS	ADE	2.8 km	MPC · JPL
272462	2005 UO_{56}	—	October 24, 2005	Anderson Mesa	LONEOS	EUN	1.4 km	MPC · JPL
272463	2005 UE_{60}	—	October 25, 2005	Anderson Mesa	LONEOS	·	1.5 km	MPC · JPL
272464	2005 UH_{63}	—	October 25, 2005	Mount Lemmon	Mount Lemmon Survey	CLA	1.9 km	MPC · JPL
272465	2005 UQ_{66}	—	October 22, 2005	Palomar	NEAT	·	2.0 km	MPC · JPL
272466	2005 UY_{66}	—	October 22, 2005	Palomar	NEAT	·	2.9 km	MPC · JPL
272467	2005 UD_{67}	—	October 22, 2005	Catalina	CSS	·	1.8 km	MPC · JPL
272468	2005 UV_{70}	—	October 23, 2005	Catalina	CSS	·	1.2 km	MPC · JPL
272469	2005 UK_{75}	—	October 24, 2005	Palomar	NEAT	·	2.1 km	MPC · JPL
272470	2005 UT_{76}	—	October 24, 2005	Kitt Peak	Spacewatch	(5)	1.3 km	MPC · JPL
272471	2005 UF_{77}	—	October 24, 2005	Kitt Peak	Spacewatch	·	2.1 km	MPC · JPL
272472	2005 UL_{77}	—	October 24, 2005	Palomar	NEAT	·	1.9 km	MPC · JPL
272473	2005 UZ_{79}	—	October 25, 2005	Kitt Peak	Spacewatch	·	1.5 km	MPC · JPL
272474	2005 UO_{80}	—	October 25, 2005	Catalina	CSS	·	1.9 km	MPC · JPL
272475	2005 UU_{80}	—	October 25, 2005	Catalina	CSS	·	1.4 km	MPC · JPL
272476	2005 UF_{87}	—	October 22, 2005	Kitt Peak	Spacewatch	·	1.5 km	MPC · JPL
272477	2005 UY_{92}	—	October 22, 2005	Kitt Peak	Spacewatch	·	1.5 km	MPC · JPL
272478	2005 UC_{96}	—	October 22, 2005	Kitt Peak	Spacewatch	·	960 m	MPC · JPL
272479	2005 UH_{102}	—	October 22, 2005	Kitt Peak	Spacewatch	V	880 m	MPC · JPL
272480	2005 UZ_{102}	—	October 22, 2005	Kitt Peak	Spacewatch	·	950 m	MPC · JPL
272481	2005 UV_{104}	—	October 22, 2005	Kitt Peak	Spacewatch	·	2.2 km	MPC · JPL
272482	2005 UH_{109}	—	October 22, 2005	Catalina	CSS	·	1.9 km	MPC · JPL
272483	2005 UG_{111}	—	October 22, 2005	Kitt Peak	Spacewatch	NEM	2.7 km	MPC · JPL
272484	2005 UA_{114}	—	October 22, 2005	Kitt Peak	Spacewatch	·	1.4 km	MPC · JPL
272485	2005 UC_{118}	—	October 24, 2005	Kitt Peak	Spacewatch	MAS	770 m	MPC · JPL
272486	2005 UA_{119}	—	October 24, 2005	Kitt Peak	Spacewatch	NYS	960 m	MPC · JPL
272487	2005 UZ_{120}	—	October 24, 2005	Kitt Peak	Spacewatch	·	2.1 km	MPC · JPL
272488	2005 UC_{128}	—	October 24, 2005	Kitt Peak	Spacewatch	·	1.8 km	MPC · JPL
272489	2005 UA_{129}	—	October 24, 2005	Kitt Peak	Spacewatch	·	1.1 km	MPC · JPL
272490	2005 UN_{130}	—	October 24, 2005	Palomar	NEAT	·	2.1 km	MPC · JPL
272491	2005 UN_{140}	—	October 25, 2005	Mount Lemmon	Mount Lemmon Survey	·	1.1 km	MPC · JPL
272492	2005 UX_{142}	—	October 25, 2005	Mount Lemmon	Mount Lemmon Survey	·	1.5 km	MPC · JPL
272493	2005 UZ_{147}	—	October 26, 2005	Kitt Peak	Spacewatch	·	1.7 km	MPC · JPL
272494	2005 UT_{149}	—	October 26, 2005	Kitt Peak	Spacewatch	·	960 m	MPC · JPL
272495	2005 UO_{151}	—	October 26, 2005	Kitt Peak	Spacewatch	·	2.0 km	MPC · JPL
272496	2005 UG_{155}	—	October 26, 2005	Kitt Peak	Spacewatch	·	2.5 km	MPC · JPL
272497	2005 UM_{155}	—	December 5, 2001	Haleakala	NEAT	·	2.0 km	MPC · JPL
272498	2005 UB_{156}	—	October 26, 2005	Palomar	NEAT	ADE	1.8 km	MPC · JPL
272499	2005 UJ_{157}	—	October 30, 2005	Socorro	LINEAR	·	1.5 km	MPC · JPL
272500	2005 UG_{159}	—	October 25, 2005	Catalina	CSS	·	1.3 km	MPC · JPL

== 272501–272600 ==
back to top

Designation			Discovery			Properties		Ref
Permanent	Provisional	Named after	Date	Site	Discoverer(s)	Category	Diam.	Ref
272501	2005 UP_{159}	—	October 21, 2005	Palomar	NEAT	·	1.6 km	MPC · JPL
272502	2005 UZ_{160}	—	October 22, 2005	Catalina	CSS	·	1.8 km	MPC · JPL
272503	2005 UZ_{164}	—	October 24, 2005	Kitt Peak	Spacewatch	·	1.4 km	MPC · JPL
272504	2005 UF_{170}	—	October 24, 2005	Kitt Peak	Spacewatch	NYS	1.5 km	MPC · JPL
272505	2005 UF_{175}	—	October 24, 2005	Kitt Peak	Spacewatch	·	4.0 km	MPC · JPL
272506	2005 UX_{179}	—	October 24, 2005	Kitt Peak	Spacewatch	·	1.6 km	MPC · JPL
272507	2005 UW_{180}	—	October 24, 2005	Kitt Peak	Spacewatch	·	1.4 km	MPC · JPL
272508	2005 UY_{184}	—	October 25, 2005	Mount Lemmon	Mount Lemmon Survey	V	850 m	MPC · JPL
272509	2005 UY_{185}	—	October 25, 2005	Mount Lemmon	Mount Lemmon Survey	·	2.2 km	MPC · JPL
272510	2005 UE_{197}	—	October 24, 2005	Kitt Peak	Spacewatch	·	1.5 km	MPC · JPL
272511	2005 UV_{198}	—	October 25, 2005	Kitt Peak	Spacewatch	·	910 m	MPC · JPL
272512	2005 UB_{200}	—	October 25, 2005	Kitt Peak	Spacewatch	·	1.3 km	MPC · JPL
272513	2005 UE_{213}	—	October 27, 2005	Mount Lemmon	Mount Lemmon Survey	·	1.9 km	MPC · JPL
272514	2005 UR_{218}	—	October 25, 2005	Kitt Peak	Spacewatch	·	1.4 km	MPC · JPL
272515	2005 UH_{226}	—	October 25, 2005	Kitt Peak	Spacewatch	·	1.8 km	MPC · JPL
272516	2005 UM_{239}	—	October 25, 2005	Kitt Peak	Spacewatch	·	1.5 km	MPC · JPL
272517	2005 UL_{249}	—	October 28, 2005	Mount Lemmon	Mount Lemmon Survey	·	1.1 km	MPC · JPL
272518	2005 UY_{251}	—	October 25, 2005	Anderson Mesa	LONEOS	(1547)	1.6 km	MPC · JPL
272519	2005 UA_{256}	—	October 24, 2005	Kitt Peak	Spacewatch	(5)	1.3 km	MPC · JPL
272520	2005 UM_{261}	—	October 26, 2005	Kitt Peak	Spacewatch	·	1.3 km	MPC · JPL
272521	2005 UL_{262}	—	October 26, 2005	Kitt Peak	Spacewatch	MAS	960 m	MPC · JPL
272522	2005 UY_{262}	—	October 27, 2005	Kitt Peak	Spacewatch	·	2.2 km	MPC · JPL
272523	2005 UN_{263}	—	October 27, 2005	Kitt Peak	Spacewatch	MAS	720 m	MPC · JPL
272524	2005 UR_{267}	—	October 27, 2005	Kitt Peak	Spacewatch	·	910 m	MPC · JPL
272525	2005 UJ_{273}	—	October 28, 2005	Mount Lemmon	Mount Lemmon Survey	(5)	1.7 km	MPC · JPL
272526	2005 UT_{273}	—	October 29, 2005	Mount Lemmon	Mount Lemmon Survey	V	790 m	MPC · JPL
272527	2005 UZ_{273}	—	October 24, 2005	Palomar	NEAT	·	2.0 km	MPC · JPL
272528	2005 UF_{276}	—	October 24, 2005	Kitt Peak	Spacewatch	·	1.2 km	MPC · JPL
272529	2005 UY_{281}	—	October 25, 2005	Mount Lemmon	Mount Lemmon Survey	MAS · fast	800 m	MPC · JPL
272530	2005 UG_{284}	—	October 26, 2005	Kitt Peak	Spacewatch	·	1.1 km	MPC · JPL
272531	2005 US_{294}	—	October 26, 2005	Kitt Peak	Spacewatch	·	1.5 km	MPC · JPL
272532	2005 UO_{296}	—	October 26, 2005	Kitt Peak	Spacewatch	·	1.4 km	MPC · JPL
272533	2005 UC_{300}	—	October 26, 2005	Kitt Peak	Spacewatch	·	1.3 km	MPC · JPL
272534	2005 UQ_{304}	—	October 26, 2005	Kitt Peak	Spacewatch	·	1.3 km	MPC · JPL
272535	2005 UZ_{306}	—	October 27, 2005	Mount Lemmon	Mount Lemmon Survey	·	1.7 km	MPC · JPL
272536	2005 UZ_{309}	—	October 28, 2005	Mount Lemmon	Mount Lemmon Survey	(17392)	1.6 km	MPC · JPL
272537	2005 UP_{314}	—	October 28, 2005	Catalina	CSS	EUN	1.3 km	MPC · JPL
272538	2005 UY_{317}	—	October 27, 2005	Kitt Peak	Spacewatch	·	1.5 km	MPC · JPL
272539	2005 UZ_{322}	—	October 28, 2005	Kitt Peak	Spacewatch	MAS	670 m	MPC · JPL
272540	2005 UG_{328}	—	October 28, 2005	Mount Lemmon	Mount Lemmon Survey	·	890 m	MPC · JPL
272541	2005 UH_{328}	—	October 28, 2005	Mount Lemmon	Mount Lemmon Survey	MAS	950 m	MPC · JPL
272542	2005 UM_{329}	—	October 28, 2005	Mount Lemmon	Mount Lemmon Survey	·	920 m	MPC · JPL
272543	2005 US_{344}	—	October 29, 2005	Kitt Peak	Spacewatch	EOS	2.2 km	MPC · JPL
272544	2005 UO_{349}	—	October 26, 2005	Anderson Mesa	LONEOS	TEL	2.1 km	MPC · JPL
272545	2005 UB_{362}	—	October 27, 2005	Kitt Peak	Spacewatch	·	1.3 km	MPC · JPL
272546	2005 UH_{367}	—	October 27, 2005	Kitt Peak	Spacewatch	·	1.2 km	MPC · JPL
272547	2005 UP_{382}	—	October 27, 2005	Socorro	LINEAR	·	970 m	MPC · JPL
272548	2005 UP_{388}	—	October 26, 2005	Mount Lemmon	Mount Lemmon Survey	·	900 m	MPC · JPL
272549	2005 UM_{396}	—	October 27, 2005	Socorro	LINEAR	·	1.3 km	MPC · JPL
272550	2005 UK_{397}	—	October 28, 2005	Socorro	LINEAR	·	2.7 km	MPC · JPL
272551	2005 UZ_{407}	—	October 31, 2005	Socorro	LINEAR	MAS	920 m	MPC · JPL
272552	2005 UE_{419}	—	October 25, 2005	Kitt Peak	Spacewatch	NYS	1.3 km	MPC · JPL
272553	2005 UL_{431}	—	October 28, 2005	Kitt Peak	Spacewatch	(17392)	1.8 km	MPC · JPL
272554	2005 UX_{441}	—	October 29, 2005	Palomar	NEAT	·	1.5 km	MPC · JPL
272555	2005 UE_{442}	—	October 29, 2005	Socorro	LINEAR	·	2.5 km	MPC · JPL
272556	2005 UQ_{443}	—	October 30, 2005	Socorro	LINEAR	·	1.6 km	MPC · JPL
272557	2005 UD_{447}	—	October 29, 2005	Catalina	CSS	·	2.0 km	MPC · JPL
272558	2005 UN_{463}	—	October 30, 2005	Kitt Peak	Spacewatch	NYS	1.3 km	MPC · JPL
272559	2005 UR_{464}	—	October 30, 2005	Kitt Peak	Spacewatch	NYS	860 m	MPC · JPL
272560	2005 UC_{469}	—	October 30, 2005	Kitt Peak	Spacewatch	·	1.1 km	MPC · JPL
272561	2005 UY_{478}	—	October 28, 2005	Kitt Peak	Spacewatch	·	2.7 km	MPC · JPL
272562	2005 UZ_{478}	—	October 28, 2005	Mount Lemmon	Mount Lemmon Survey	ERI	3.0 km	MPC · JPL
272563	2005 UD_{480}	—	October 25, 2005	Catalina	CSS	·	1.4 km	MPC · JPL
272564	2005 UJ_{482}	—	October 22, 2005	Catalina	CSS	·	1.0 km	MPC · JPL
272565	2005 UV_{491}	—	October 24, 2005	Palomar	NEAT	·	1.8 km	MPC · JPL
272566	2005 UX_{493}	—	January 15, 1996	Kitt Peak	Spacewatch	·	3.8 km	MPC · JPL
272567	2005 UB_{495}	—	October 26, 2005	Socorro	LINEAR	·	1.3 km	MPC · JPL
272568	2005 UX_{499}	—	October 27, 2005	Socorro	LINEAR	EUN	1.5 km	MPC · JPL
272569	2005 UN_{511}	—	October 27, 2005	Mount Lemmon	Mount Lemmon Survey	·	1.6 km	MPC · JPL
272570	2005 UG_{514}	—	October 20, 2005	Apache Point	A. C. Becker	·	1.1 km	MPC · JPL
272571	2005 US_{514}	—	October 20, 2005	Apache Point	A. C. Becker	·	2.6 km	MPC · JPL
272572	2005 UR_{516}	—	October 25, 2005	Apache Point	A. C. Becker	NYS	1.1 km	MPC · JPL
272573	2005 UC_{524}	—	October 27, 2005	Apache Point	A. C. Becker	·	1.1 km	MPC · JPL
272574	2005 VX_{5}	—	November 10, 2005	Kitt Peak	Spacewatch	MAS	870 m	MPC · JPL
272575	2005 VM_{6}	—	November 6, 2005	Kitt Peak	Spacewatch	·	2.5 km	MPC · JPL
272576	2005 VT_{10}	—	November 2, 2005	Mount Lemmon	Mount Lemmon Survey	·	1.9 km	MPC · JPL
272577	2005 VY_{14}	—	November 4, 2005	Kitt Peak	Spacewatch	·	2.5 km	MPC · JPL
272578	2005 VM_{17}	—	November 4, 2005	Kitt Peak	Spacewatch	·	2.7 km	MPC · JPL
272579	2005 VK_{23}	—	November 1, 2005	Kitt Peak	Spacewatch	(5)	1.1 km	MPC · JPL
272580	2005 VU_{27}	—	November 3, 2005	Mount Lemmon	Mount Lemmon Survey	·	1.4 km	MPC · JPL
272581	2005 VN_{32}	—	November 4, 2005	Kitt Peak	Spacewatch	·	1.9 km	MPC · JPL
272582	2005 VA_{39}	—	November 3, 2005	Mount Lemmon	Mount Lemmon Survey	·	1.7 km	MPC · JPL
272583	2005 VY_{41}	—	November 3, 2005	Socorro	LINEAR	·	2.3 km	MPC · JPL
272584	2005 VE_{42}	—	November 3, 2005	Catalina	CSS	·	1.9 km	MPC · JPL
272585	2005 VR_{46}	—	November 4, 2005	Mount Lemmon	Mount Lemmon Survey	·	3.9 km	MPC · JPL
272586	2005 VA_{49}	—	November 1, 2005	Kitt Peak	Spacewatch	·	1.5 km	MPC · JPL
272587	2005 VQ_{51}	—	November 3, 2005	Catalina	CSS	·	970 m	MPC · JPL
272588	2005 VB_{55}	—	November 4, 2005	Catalina	CSS	(5)	1.3 km	MPC · JPL
272589	2005 VA_{58}	—	November 4, 2005	Mount Lemmon	Mount Lemmon Survey	·	1.1 km	MPC · JPL
272590	2005 VZ_{71}	—	November 1, 2005	Mount Lemmon	Mount Lemmon Survey	TIR	4.3 km	MPC · JPL
272591	2005 VP_{77}	—	November 5, 2005	Catalina	CSS	·	1.1 km	MPC · JPL
272592	2005 VB_{81}	—	November 5, 2005	Kitt Peak	Spacewatch	·	4.6 km	MPC · JPL
272593	2005 VL_{89}	—	November 6, 2005	Kitt Peak	Spacewatch	KON	2.2 km	MPC · JPL
272594	2005 VE_{91}	—	November 6, 2005	Kitt Peak	Spacewatch	·	4.3 km	MPC · JPL
272595	2005 VB_{93}	—	November 6, 2005	Mount Lemmon	Mount Lemmon Survey	·	1.6 km	MPC · JPL
272596	2005 VP_{107}	—	November 5, 2005	Kitt Peak	Spacewatch	EOS	2.8 km	MPC · JPL
272597	2005 VD_{109}	—	November 6, 2005	Mount Lemmon	Mount Lemmon Survey	·	1.5 km	MPC · JPL
272598	2005 VJ_{110}	—	November 6, 2005	Mount Lemmon	Mount Lemmon Survey	MAS	1.1 km	MPC · JPL
272599	2005 VF_{114}	—	November 10, 2005	Mount Lemmon	Mount Lemmon Survey	·	1.4 km	MPC · JPL
272600	2005 VV_{125}	—	November 1, 2005	Apache Point	A. C. Becker	·	1.0 km	MPC · JPL

== 272601–272700 ==
back to top

Designation			Discovery			Properties		Ref
Permanent	Provisional	Named after	Date	Site	Discoverer(s)	Category	Diam.	Ref
272601	2005 VA_{135}	—	November 3, 2005	Kitt Peak	Spacewatch	(5)	1.1 km	MPC · JPL
272602	2005 WC_{3}	—	November 20, 2005	Palomar	NEAT	·	1.9 km	MPC · JPL
272603	2005 WL_{7}	—	November 21, 2005	Kitt Peak	Spacewatch	·	2.8 km	MPC · JPL
272604	2005 WM_{7}	—	November 21, 2005	Kitt Peak	Spacewatch	·	1.3 km	MPC · JPL
272605	2005 WF_{10}	—	November 21, 2005	Kitt Peak	Spacewatch	(5)	1.5 km	MPC · JPL
272606	2005 WV_{14}	—	November 22, 2005	Kitt Peak	Spacewatch	(7744)	2.1 km	MPC · JPL
272607	2005 WH_{15}	—	November 22, 2005	Kitt Peak	Spacewatch	(5)	1.1 km	MPC · JPL
272608	2005 WO_{15}	—	November 22, 2005	Kitt Peak	Spacewatch	·	1.3 km	MPC · JPL
272609	2005 WF_{18}	—	November 22, 2005	Kitt Peak	Spacewatch	·	3.3 km	MPC · JPL
272610	2005 WM_{18}	—	November 22, 2005	Kitt Peak	Spacewatch	·	1.3 km	MPC · JPL
272611	2005 WT_{18}	—	November 22, 2005	Kitt Peak	Spacewatch	·	2.1 km	MPC · JPL
272612	2005 WZ_{18}	—	November 22, 2005	Kitt Peak	Spacewatch	·	2.0 km	MPC · JPL
272613	2005 WM_{22}	—	November 21, 2005	Kitt Peak	Spacewatch	·	1.5 km	MPC · JPL
272614	2005 WG_{24}	—	November 21, 2005	Anderson Mesa	LONEOS	ADE	2.2 km	MPC · JPL
272615	2005 WE_{26}	—	November 21, 2005	Kitt Peak	Spacewatch	(5)	1.2 km	MPC · JPL
272616	2005 WG_{26}	—	November 21, 2005	Kitt Peak	Spacewatch	·	1.4 km	MPC · JPL
272617	2005 WM_{27}	—	November 21, 2005	Kitt Peak	Spacewatch	PAD	1.8 km	MPC · JPL
272618	2005 WA_{29}	—	November 21, 2005	Kitt Peak	Spacewatch	WIT	820 m	MPC · JPL
272619	2005 WY_{33}	—	November 21, 2005	Kitt Peak	Spacewatch	·	2.5 km	MPC · JPL
272620	2005 WB_{35}	—	November 22, 2005	Kitt Peak	Spacewatch	·	1.2 km	MPC · JPL
272621	2005 WG_{35}	—	November 22, 2005	Kitt Peak	Spacewatch	MAS	750 m	MPC · JPL
272622	2005 WU_{38}	—	November 22, 2005	Kitt Peak	Spacewatch	·	2.0 km	MPC · JPL
272623	2005 WJ_{40}	—	November 25, 2005	Mount Lemmon	Mount Lemmon Survey	·	1.8 km	MPC · JPL
272624	2005 WY_{47}	—	November 25, 2005	Kitt Peak	Spacewatch	NYS	1.4 km	MPC · JPL
272625	2005 WO_{58}	—	November 25, 2005	Mount Lemmon	Mount Lemmon Survey	·	2.7 km	MPC · JPL
272626	2005 WX_{61}	—	November 25, 2005	Kitt Peak	Spacewatch	·	1.3 km	MPC · JPL
272627	2005 WZ_{63}	—	November 25, 2005	Catalina	CSS	·	1.7 km	MPC · JPL
272628	2005 WK_{65}	—	November 21, 2005	Kitt Peak	Spacewatch	·	1.3 km	MPC · JPL
272629	2005 WE_{66}	—	November 22, 2005	Kitt Peak	Spacewatch	·	2.0 km	MPC · JPL
272630	2005 WL_{66}	—	November 22, 2005	Kitt Peak	Spacewatch	·	2.0 km	MPC · JPL
272631	2005 WC_{69}	—	November 25, 2005	Mount Lemmon	Mount Lemmon Survey	·	1.3 km	MPC · JPL
272632	2005 WF_{71}	—	November 21, 2005	Kitt Peak	Spacewatch	EOS	2.5 km	MPC · JPL
272633	2005 WD_{73}	—	November 25, 2005	Catalina	CSS	·	1.5 km	MPC · JPL
272634	2005 WT_{74}	—	November 28, 2005	Palomar	NEAT	EUN	1.5 km	MPC · JPL
272635	2005 WB_{76}	—	November 25, 2005	Kitt Peak	Spacewatch	·	2.3 km	MPC · JPL
272636	2005 WJ_{76}	—	November 25, 2005	Kitt Peak	Spacewatch	·	1.3 km	MPC · JPL
272637	2005 WV_{76}	—	November 25, 2005	Kitt Peak	Spacewatch	·	2.1 km	MPC · JPL
272638	2005 WL_{79}	—	November 25, 2005	Kitt Peak	Spacewatch	·	1.5 km	MPC · JPL
272639	2005 WB_{81}	—	November 26, 2005	Mount Lemmon	Mount Lemmon Survey	·	1.9 km	MPC · JPL
272640	2005 WN_{84}	—	November 26, 2005	Mount Lemmon	Mount Lemmon Survey	·	1.5 km	MPC · JPL
272641	2005 WC_{91}	—	November 28, 2005	Catalina	CSS	·	1.4 km	MPC · JPL
272642	2005 WH_{99}	—	November 28, 2005	Mount Lemmon	Mount Lemmon Survey	·	3.5 km	MPC · JPL
272643	2005 WC_{100}	—	November 28, 2005	Catalina	CSS	·	1.3 km	MPC · JPL
272644	2005 WH_{108}	—	November 29, 2005	Mount Lemmon	Mount Lemmon Survey	(2076)	1.2 km	MPC · JPL
272645	2005 WK_{115}	—	November 29, 2005	Mount Lemmon	Mount Lemmon Survey	·	2.8 km	MPC · JPL
272646	2005 WC_{117}	—	November 30, 2005	Eskridge	Farpoint	(5)	1.2 km	MPC · JPL
272647	2005 WW_{121}	—	November 30, 2005	Socorro	LINEAR	·	1.7 km	MPC · JPL
272648	2005 WZ_{124}	—	November 25, 2005	Kitt Peak	Spacewatch	·	1.3 km	MPC · JPL
272649	2005 WD_{135}	—	November 25, 2005	Mount Lemmon	Mount Lemmon Survey	·	1.5 km	MPC · JPL
272650	2005 WV_{144}	—	November 25, 2005	Kitt Peak	Spacewatch	MIS	1.9 km	MPC · JPL
272651	2005 WX_{147}	—	November 25, 2005	Kitt Peak	Spacewatch	AEO	1.6 km	MPC · JPL
272652	2005 WV_{156}	—	November 30, 2005	Socorro	LINEAR	·	2.0 km	MPC · JPL
272653	2005 WR_{162}	—	November 28, 2005	Mount Lemmon	Mount Lemmon Survey	EUN	2.1 km	MPC · JPL
272654	2005 WA_{171}	—	November 30, 2005	Kitt Peak	Spacewatch	NYS	1.6 km	MPC · JPL
272655	2005 WD_{171}	—	November 30, 2005	Kitt Peak	Spacewatch	MAS	950 m	MPC · JPL
272656	2005 WS_{174}	—	November 30, 2005	Kitt Peak	Spacewatch	·	2.1 km	MPC · JPL
272657	2005 WP_{175}	—	November 30, 2005	Kitt Peak	Spacewatch	·	2.8 km	MPC · JPL
272658	2005 WD_{177}	—	November 30, 2005	Kitt Peak	Spacewatch	MIS	2.5 km	MPC · JPL
272659	2005 WW_{181}	—	November 25, 2005	Catalina	CSS	RAF	1.2 km	MPC · JPL
272660	2005 WN_{182}	—	November 25, 2005	Catalina	CSS	·	3.5 km	MPC · JPL
272661	2005 WZ_{182}	—	November 27, 2005	Anderson Mesa	LONEOS	EUN	1.7 km	MPC · JPL
272662	2005 WM_{184}	—	November 29, 2005	Anderson Mesa	LONEOS	·	1.9 km	MPC · JPL
272663	2005 WF_{186}	—	November 30, 2005	Socorro	LINEAR	·	3.4 km	MPC · JPL
272664	2005 WN_{186}	—	November 29, 2005	Mount Lemmon	Mount Lemmon Survey	·	1.8 km	MPC · JPL
272665	2005 WW_{186}	—	November 29, 2005	Kitt Peak	Spacewatch	HOF	3.4 km	MPC · JPL
272666	2005 WN_{192}	—	November 25, 2005	Catalina	CSS	·	1.7 km	MPC · JPL
272667	2005 WC_{197}	—	November 30, 2005	Palomar	NEAT	(5)	1.7 km	MPC · JPL
272668	2005 WQ_{201}	—	November 29, 2005	Kitt Peak	Spacewatch	·	1.6 km	MPC · JPL
272669	2005 WP_{204}	—	November 25, 2005	Mount Lemmon	Mount Lemmon Survey	·	3.0 km	MPC · JPL
272670	2005 XD	—	December 1, 2005	Mayhill	Mayhill	·	3.0 km	MPC · JPL
272671	2005 XQ	—	December 1, 2005	Kitami	K. Endate	·	2.4 km	MPC · JPL
272672	2005 XP_{1}	—	December 4, 2005	Junk Bond	D. Healy	·	2.9 km	MPC · JPL
272673	2005 XP_{3}	—	December 1, 2005	Palomar	NEAT	·	1.9 km	MPC · JPL
272674	2005 XS_{3}	—	December 1, 2005	Socorro	LINEAR	·	3.7 km	MPC · JPL
272675	2005 XV_{5}	—	December 1, 2005	Mount Lemmon	Mount Lemmon Survey	ADE	2.6 km	MPC · JPL
272676	2005 XD_{14}	—	December 1, 2005	Kitt Peak	Spacewatch	·	1.6 km	MPC · JPL
272677	2005 XE_{17}	—	December 1, 2005	Kitt Peak	Spacewatch	·	1.7 km	MPC · JPL
272678	2005 XD_{21}	—	December 2, 2005	Mount Lemmon	Mount Lemmon Survey	·	1.4 km	MPC · JPL
272679	2005 XC_{23}	—	December 2, 2005	Mount Lemmon	Mount Lemmon Survey	(5)	1.8 km	MPC · JPL
272680	2005 XJ_{26}	—	December 4, 2005	Mount Lemmon	Mount Lemmon Survey	MAS	940 m	MPC · JPL
272681	2005 XN_{36}	—	December 4, 2005	Kitt Peak	Spacewatch	·	2.4 km	MPC · JPL
272682	2005 XH_{38}	—	December 4, 2005	Kitt Peak	Spacewatch	·	3.6 km	MPC · JPL
272683	2005 XH_{48}	—	December 2, 2005	Mount Lemmon	Mount Lemmon Survey	·	1.2 km	MPC · JPL
272684	2005 XJ_{57}	—	December 1, 2005	Catalina	CSS	HNS	1.4 km	MPC · JPL
272685	2005 XQ_{61}	—	December 4, 2005	Goodricke-Pigott	Goodricke-Pigott	·	7.1 km	MPC · JPL
272686	2005 XX_{61}	—	December 5, 2005	Kitt Peak	Spacewatch	·	1.0 km	MPC · JPL
272687	2005 XY_{64}	—	December 7, 2005	Catalina	CSS	·	1.7 km	MPC · JPL
272688	2005 XA_{66}	—	December 7, 2005	Kitt Peak	Spacewatch	·	1.8 km	MPC · JPL
272689	2005 XQ_{66}	—	December 3, 2005	Kitt Peak	Spacewatch	·	3.2 km	MPC · JPL
272690	2005 XT_{67}	—	December 5, 2005	Mount Lemmon	Mount Lemmon Survey	·	1.7 km	MPC · JPL
272691	2005 XS_{68}	—	December 6, 2005	Kitt Peak	Spacewatch	MAS	930 m	MPC · JPL
272692	2005 XE_{75}	—	December 6, 2005	Kitt Peak	Spacewatch	·	1.6 km	MPC · JPL
272693	2005 XA_{82}	—	December 8, 2005	Kitt Peak	Spacewatch	·	1.7 km	MPC · JPL
272694	2005 XG_{86}	—	December 7, 2005	Kitt Peak	Spacewatch	·	1.6 km	MPC · JPL
272695	2005 XU_{86}	—	December 8, 2005	Kitt Peak	Spacewatch	·	2.3 km	MPC · JPL
272696	2005 XF_{95}	—	December 1, 2005	Kitt Peak	M. W. Buie	V	820 m	MPC · JPL
272697	2005 XX_{104}	—	December 1, 2005	Kitt Peak	M. W. Buie	·	1.5 km	MPC · JPL
272698	2005 XP_{109}	—	December 1, 2005	Kitt Peak	M. W. Buie	·	1.2 km	MPC · JPL
272699	2005 YJ_{1}	—	December 21, 2005	Catalina	CSS	EUN	1.6 km	MPC · JPL
272700	2005 YY_{10}	—	December 21, 2005	Kitt Peak	Spacewatch	·	2.0 km	MPC · JPL

== 272701–272800 ==
back to top

Designation			Discovery			Properties		Ref
Permanent	Provisional	Named after	Date	Site	Discoverer(s)	Category	Diam.	Ref
272701	2005 YU_{11}	—	December 21, 2005	Kitt Peak	Spacewatch	·	2.0 km	MPC · JPL
272702	2005 YU_{12}	—	December 22, 2005	Kitt Peak	Spacewatch	(5)	1.7 km	MPC · JPL
272703	2005 YL_{13}	—	December 22, 2005	Kitt Peak	Spacewatch	·	1.4 km	MPC · JPL
272704	2005 YQ_{13}	—	December 22, 2005	Kitt Peak	Spacewatch	KOR	1.7 km	MPC · JPL
272705	2005 YQ_{25}	—	December 24, 2005	Kitt Peak	Spacewatch	KOR	1.6 km	MPC · JPL
272706	2005 YR_{25}	—	December 24, 2005	Kitt Peak	Spacewatch	(5)	1.8 km	MPC · JPL
272707	2005 YM_{26}	—	December 24, 2005	Kitt Peak	Spacewatch	·	2.4 km	MPC · JPL
272708	2005 YP_{26}	—	December 21, 2005	Kitt Peak	Spacewatch	·	1.9 km	MPC · JPL
272709	2005 YZ_{27}	—	December 22, 2005	Kitt Peak	Spacewatch	·	2.5 km	MPC · JPL
272710	2005 YC_{29}	—	December 24, 2005	Kitt Peak	Spacewatch	·	1.6 km	MPC · JPL
272711	2005 YM_{31}	—	December 22, 2005	Kitt Peak	Spacewatch	·	1.9 km	MPC · JPL
272712	2005 YV_{31}	—	December 22, 2005	Kitt Peak	Spacewatch	·	2.4 km	MPC · JPL
272713	2005 YG_{32}	—	December 22, 2005	Kitt Peak	Spacewatch	·	2.6 km	MPC · JPL
272714	2005 YM_{35}	—	December 25, 2005	Kitt Peak	Spacewatch	·	2.0 km	MPC · JPL
272715	2005 YJ_{36}	—	December 25, 2005	Kitt Peak	Spacewatch	·	1.7 km	MPC · JPL
272716	2005 YS_{41}	—	December 22, 2005	Kitt Peak	Spacewatch	·	1.5 km	MPC · JPL
272717	2005 YQ_{42}	—	December 24, 2005	Kitt Peak	Spacewatch	·	1.6 km	MPC · JPL
272718	2005 YG_{46}	—	December 25, 2005	Kitt Peak	Spacewatch	·	2.2 km	MPC · JPL
272719	2005 YD_{51}	—	December 25, 2005	Mount Lemmon	Mount Lemmon Survey	·	2.2 km	MPC · JPL
272720	2005 YS_{52}	—	December 26, 2005	Mount Lemmon	Mount Lemmon Survey	·	2.2 km	MPC · JPL
272721	2005 YQ_{58}	—	December 24, 2005	Kitt Peak	Spacewatch	·	2.0 km	MPC · JPL
272722	2005 YC_{60}	—	December 22, 2005	Kitt Peak	Spacewatch	·	2.2 km	MPC · JPL
272723	2005 YJ_{63}	—	December 24, 2005	Kitt Peak	Spacewatch	·	1.2 km	MPC · JPL
272724	2005 YB_{68}	—	December 26, 2005	Kitt Peak	Spacewatch	·	4.3 km	MPC · JPL
272725	2005 YD_{68}	—	December 26, 2005	Kitt Peak	Spacewatch	(5)	1.6 km	MPC · JPL
272726	2005 YN_{72}	—	December 24, 2005	Kitt Peak	Spacewatch	·	2.1 km	MPC · JPL
272727	2005 YD_{74}	—	December 24, 2005	Kitt Peak	Spacewatch	·	1.5 km	MPC · JPL
272728	2005 YW_{76}	—	December 24, 2005	Kitt Peak	Spacewatch	·	1.7 km	MPC · JPL
272729	2005 YW_{79}	—	December 24, 2005	Kitt Peak	Spacewatch	·	2.3 km	MPC · JPL
272730	2005 YP_{81}	—	December 24, 2005	Kitt Peak	Spacewatch	NYS	1.6 km	MPC · JPL
272731	2005 YJ_{84}	—	December 24, 2005	Kitt Peak	Spacewatch	·	2.5 km	MPC · JPL
272732	2005 YU_{84}	—	December 25, 2005	Kitt Peak	Spacewatch	EOS	3.5 km	MPC · JPL
272733	2005 YT_{89}	—	December 26, 2005	Mount Lemmon	Mount Lemmon Survey	HNS	1.7 km	MPC · JPL
272734	2005 YW_{94}	—	December 23, 2005	Palomar	NEAT	·	3.2 km	MPC · JPL
272735	2005 YS_{96}	—	December 23, 2005	Kitt Peak	Spacewatch	·	2.7 km	MPC · JPL
272736	2005 YX_{98}	—	December 27, 2005	Catalina	CSS	·	2.5 km	MPC · JPL
272737	2005 YV_{99}	—	December 28, 2005	Kitt Peak	Spacewatch	·	1.9 km	MPC · JPL
272738	2005 YK_{105}	—	December 25, 2005	Kitt Peak	Spacewatch	AGN	1.6 km	MPC · JPL
272739	2005 YV_{107}	—	December 25, 2005	Kitt Peak	Spacewatch	·	2.2 km	MPC · JPL
272740	2005 YZ_{109}	—	December 25, 2005	Kitt Peak	Spacewatch	·	1.7 km	MPC · JPL
272741	2005 YZ_{113}	—	December 25, 2005	Kitt Peak	Spacewatch	·	2.2 km	MPC · JPL
272742	2005 YB_{114}	—	December 25, 2005	Kitt Peak	Spacewatch	·	2.5 km	MPC · JPL
272743	2005 YY_{114}	—	December 25, 2005	Kitt Peak	Spacewatch	·	1.7 km	MPC · JPL
272744	2005 YB_{117}	—	December 25, 2005	Kitt Peak	Spacewatch	·	2.4 km	MPC · JPL
272745	2005 YX_{123}	—	December 25, 2005	Kitt Peak	Spacewatch	·	2.1 km	MPC · JPL
272746 Paoladiomede	2005 YA_{129}	Paoladiomede	December 29, 2005	Suno	Foglia, S.	DOR	2.2 km	MPC · JPL
272747	2005 YK_{131}	—	December 25, 2005	Mount Lemmon	Mount Lemmon Survey	·	5.6 km	MPC · JPL
272748	2005 YV_{131}	—	December 25, 2005	Mount Lemmon	Mount Lemmon Survey	·	1.8 km	MPC · JPL
272749	2005 YW_{131}	—	December 25, 2005	Mount Lemmon	Mount Lemmon Survey	·	1.8 km	MPC · JPL
272750	2005 YJ_{135}	—	December 26, 2005	Kitt Peak	Spacewatch	·	1.8 km	MPC · JPL
272751	2005 YG_{140}	—	December 28, 2005	Mount Lemmon	Mount Lemmon Survey	·	1.6 km	MPC · JPL
272752	2005 YP_{141}	—	December 28, 2005	Mount Lemmon	Mount Lemmon Survey	·	3.4 km	MPC · JPL
272753	2005 YD_{142}	—	December 28, 2005	Mount Lemmon	Mount Lemmon Survey	·	1.6 km	MPC · JPL
272754	2005 YE_{143}	—	December 28, 2005	Mount Lemmon	Mount Lemmon Survey	·	1.9 km	MPC · JPL
272755	2005 YP_{143}	—	December 28, 2005	Mount Lemmon	Mount Lemmon Survey	·	2.2 km	MPC · JPL
272756	2005 YT_{145}	—	December 29, 2005	Socorro	LINEAR	·	4.7 km	MPC · JPL
272757	2005 YQ_{150}	—	December 25, 2005	Kitt Peak	Spacewatch	·	2.5 km	MPC · JPL
272758	2005 YZ_{150}	—	December 25, 2005	Kitt Peak	Spacewatch	·	1.9 km	MPC · JPL
272759	2005 YM_{151}	—	December 25, 2005	Kitt Peak	Spacewatch	·	1.6 km	MPC · JPL
272760	2005 YG_{152}	—	December 27, 2005	Mount Lemmon	Mount Lemmon Survey	·	2.6 km	MPC · JPL
272761	2005 YW_{152}	—	December 28, 2005	Catalina	CSS	·	3.4 km	MPC · JPL
272762	2005 YX_{161}	—	December 27, 2005	Kitt Peak	Spacewatch	·	2.0 km	MPC · JPL
272763	2005 YD_{162}	—	December 27, 2005	Kitt Peak	Spacewatch	·	2.3 km	MPC · JPL
272764	2005 YZ_{166}	—	December 27, 2005	Kitt Peak	Spacewatch	·	1.7 km	MPC · JPL
272765	2005 YJ_{172}	—	December 22, 2005	Catalina	CSS	·	2.6 km	MPC · JPL
272766	2005 YO_{172}	—	December 23, 2005	Socorro	LINEAR	·	3.3 km	MPC · JPL
272767	2005 YO_{174}	—	December 29, 2005	Palomar	NEAT	·	2.0 km	MPC · JPL
272768	2005 YZ_{174}	—	December 30, 2005	Socorro	LINEAR	(5)	1.8 km	MPC · JPL
272769	2005 YL_{176}	—	December 22, 2005	Kitt Peak	Spacewatch	(5)	1.6 km	MPC · JPL
272770	2005 YW_{179}	—	December 28, 2005	Mount Lemmon	Mount Lemmon Survey	·	4.5 km	MPC · JPL
272771	2005 YX_{185}	—	December 30, 2005	Mount Lemmon	Mount Lemmon Survey	EOS	2.4 km	MPC · JPL
272772	2005 YG_{186}	—	December 28, 2005	Catalina	CSS	·	2.9 km	MPC · JPL
272773	2005 YO_{189}	—	December 29, 2005	Kitt Peak	Spacewatch	·	2.6 km	MPC · JPL
272774	2005 YJ_{191}	—	December 30, 2005	Kitt Peak	Spacewatch	·	2.3 km	MPC · JPL
272775	2005 YC_{192}	—	December 30, 2005	Kitt Peak	Spacewatch	·	2.4 km	MPC · JPL
272776	2005 YC_{196}	—	December 24, 2005	Catalina	CSS	·	3.6 km	MPC · JPL
272777	2005 YC_{202}	—	December 24, 2005	Kitt Peak	Spacewatch	·	1.9 km	MPC · JPL
272778	2005 YF_{203}	—	December 25, 2005	Kitt Peak	Spacewatch	·	1.5 km	MPC · JPL
272779	2005 YG_{207}	—	December 28, 2005	Kitt Peak	Spacewatch	·	1.8 km	MPC · JPL
272780	2005 YE_{208}	—	December 28, 2005	Catalina	CSS	·	2.0 km	MPC · JPL
272781	2005 YT_{208}	—	December 22, 2005	Catalina	CSS	·	2.1 km	MPC · JPL
272782	2005 YJ_{209}	—	December 23, 2005	Socorro	LINEAR	·	2.0 km	MPC · JPL
272783	2005 YO_{216}	—	December 29, 2005	Socorro	LINEAR	(5)	1.7 km	MPC · JPL
272784	2005 YU_{230}	—	December 26, 2005	Mount Lemmon	Mount Lemmon Survey	EOS	2.6 km	MPC · JPL
272785	2005 YJ_{237}	—	December 28, 2005	Mount Lemmon	Mount Lemmon Survey	·	3.2 km	MPC · JPL
272786	2005 YU_{239}	—	December 29, 2005	Kitt Peak	Spacewatch	·	1.4 km	MPC · JPL
272787	2005 YO_{251}	—	December 28, 2005	Kitt Peak	Spacewatch	·	1.9 km	MPC · JPL
272788	2005 YB_{267}	—	December 22, 2005	Kitt Peak	Spacewatch	·	1.3 km	MPC · JPL
272789	2005 YC_{267}	—	December 22, 2005	Kitt Peak	Spacewatch	·	1.7 km	MPC · JPL
272790	2005 YW_{267}	—	December 25, 2005	Kitt Peak	Spacewatch	·	2.0 km	MPC · JPL
272791	2005 YZ_{267}	—	December 25, 2005	Kitt Peak	Spacewatch	·	1.6 km	MPC · JPL
272792	2005 YY_{268}	—	December 25, 2005	Mount Lemmon	Mount Lemmon Survey	·	3.0 km	MPC · JPL
272793	2005 YG_{272}	—	December 29, 2005	Kitt Peak	Spacewatch	DOR	3.3 km	MPC · JPL
272794	2005 YR_{286}	—	December 30, 2005	Mount Lemmon	Mount Lemmon Survey	HOF	3.8 km	MPC · JPL
272795	2005 YQ_{288}	—	December 29, 2005	Mount Lemmon	Mount Lemmon Survey	(5)	1.8 km	MPC · JPL
272796	2005 YF_{291}	—	December 28, 2005	Mount Lemmon	Mount Lemmon Survey	KOR	1.5 km	MPC · JPL
272797	2006 AT_{1}	—	January 2, 2006	Mount Lemmon	Mount Lemmon Survey	·	2.9 km	MPC · JPL
272798	2006 AR_{4}	—	January 5, 2006	Anderson Mesa	LONEOS	·	2.6 km	MPC · JPL
272799	2006 AC_{11}	—	January 4, 2006	Mount Lemmon	Mount Lemmon Survey	·	3.8 km	MPC · JPL
272800	2006 AL_{13}	—	January 5, 2006	Mount Lemmon	Mount Lemmon Survey	·	2.1 km	MPC · JPL

== 272801–272900 ==
back to top

Designation			Discovery			Properties		Ref
Permanent	Provisional	Named after	Date	Site	Discoverer(s)	Category	Diam.	Ref
272801	2006 AH_{14}	—	January 5, 2006	Mount Lemmon	Mount Lemmon Survey	·	4.1 km	MPC · JPL
272802	2006 AV_{14}	—	January 5, 2006	Mount Lemmon	Mount Lemmon Survey	GEF	1.6 km	MPC · JPL
272803	2006 AQ_{16}	—	January 5, 2006	Socorro	LINEAR	·	2.9 km	MPC · JPL
272804	2006 AP_{30}	—	January 4, 2006	Catalina	CSS	·	3.1 km	MPC · JPL
272805	2006 AK_{31}	—	January 5, 2006	Anderson Mesa	LONEOS	·	2.8 km	MPC · JPL
272806	2006 AF_{32}	—	January 5, 2006	Catalina	CSS	·	2.2 km	MPC · JPL
272807	2006 AQ_{33}	—	January 6, 2006	Socorro	LINEAR	·	2.0 km	MPC · JPL
272808	2006 AS_{33}	—	January 6, 2006	Kitt Peak	Spacewatch	·	2.2 km	MPC · JPL
272809	2006 AG_{34}	—	January 6, 2006	Mount Lemmon	Mount Lemmon Survey	·	1.6 km	MPC · JPL
272810	2006 AM_{34}	—	January 6, 2006	Catalina	CSS	·	2.7 km	MPC · JPL
272811	2006 AQ_{39}	—	January 7, 2006	Mount Lemmon	Mount Lemmon Survey	·	2.1 km	MPC · JPL
272812	2006 AD_{47}	—	January 6, 2006	Kitt Peak	Spacewatch	·	1.9 km	MPC · JPL
272813	2006 AE_{47}	—	January 6, 2006	Kitt Peak	Spacewatch	·	2.5 km	MPC · JPL
272814	2006 AE_{48}	—	January 8, 2006	Mount Lemmon	Mount Lemmon Survey	·	3.7 km	MPC · JPL
272815	2006 AQ_{48}	—	January 8, 2006	Mount Lemmon	Mount Lemmon Survey	·	3.7 km	MPC · JPL
272816	2006 AG_{53}	—	January 5, 2006	Kitt Peak	Spacewatch	·	2.4 km	MPC · JPL
272817	2006 AT_{58}	—	January 4, 2006	Kitt Peak	Spacewatch	KOR	1.6 km	MPC · JPL
272818	2006 AK_{63}	—	January 6, 2006	Kitt Peak	Spacewatch	·	3.7 km	MPC · JPL
272819	2006 AC_{68}	—	January 5, 2006	Mount Lemmon	Mount Lemmon Survey	WIT	1.3 km	MPC · JPL
272820	2006 AJ_{71}	—	January 6, 2006	Kitt Peak	Spacewatch	·	2.2 km	MPC · JPL
272821	2006 AK_{71}	—	January 6, 2006	Kitt Peak	Spacewatch	·	3.3 km	MPC · JPL
272822	2006 AW_{72}	—	January 7, 2006	Kitt Peak	Spacewatch	·	2.1 km	MPC · JPL
272823	2006 AJ_{73}	—	January 8, 2006	Mount Lemmon	Mount Lemmon Survey	·	4.1 km	MPC · JPL
272824	2006 AG_{85}	—	January 7, 2006	Socorro	LINEAR	·	2.8 km	MPC · JPL
272825	2006 AG_{91}	—	January 7, 2006	Mount Lemmon	Mount Lemmon Survey	·	1.6 km	MPC · JPL
272826	2006 AD_{93}	—	January 7, 2006	Kitt Peak	Spacewatch	·	1.8 km	MPC · JPL
272827	2006 AS_{96}	—	January 7, 2006	Anderson Mesa	LONEOS	·	2.9 km	MPC · JPL
272828	2006 AK_{100}	—	January 7, 2006	Mount Lemmon	Mount Lemmon Survey	HOF	2.7 km	MPC · JPL
272829	2006 AL_{100}	—	January 7, 2006	Kitt Peak	Spacewatch	·	1.9 km	MPC · JPL
272830	2006 AN_{100}	—	January 9, 2006	Mount Lemmon	Mount Lemmon Survey	·	2.6 km	MPC · JPL
272831	2006 AE_{101}	—	January 7, 2006	Mount Lemmon	Mount Lemmon Survey	·	1.6 km	MPC · JPL
272832	2006 BW	—	January 20, 2006	Socorro	LINEAR	H	810 m	MPC · JPL
272833	2006 BV_{1}	—	January 20, 2006	Kitt Peak	Spacewatch	·	2.8 km	MPC · JPL
272834	2006 BA_{2}	—	January 20, 2006	Kitt Peak	Spacewatch	·	2.3 km	MPC · JPL
272835	2006 BS_{2}	—	January 20, 2006	Catalina	CSS	·	2.9 km	MPC · JPL
272836	2006 BH_{7}	—	January 21, 2006	Kitt Peak	Spacewatch	·	1.6 km	MPC · JPL
272837	2006 BH_{10}	—	January 20, 2006	Kitt Peak	Spacewatch	KOR	1.6 km	MPC · JPL
272838	2006 BY_{13}	—	January 22, 2006	Catalina	CSS	·	2.6 km	MPC · JPL
272839	2006 BD_{17}	—	January 22, 2006	Anderson Mesa	LONEOS	·	4.8 km	MPC · JPL
272840	2006 BC_{18}	—	January 22, 2006	Mount Lemmon	Mount Lemmon Survey	·	2.5 km	MPC · JPL
272841	2006 BG_{18}	—	January 22, 2006	Mount Lemmon	Mount Lemmon Survey	NEM	2.4 km	MPC · JPL
272842	2006 BE_{20}	—	January 22, 2006	Anderson Mesa	LONEOS	(32418)	2.9 km	MPC · JPL
272843	2006 BY_{21}	—	January 22, 2006	Mount Lemmon	Mount Lemmon Survey	·	4.2 km	MPC · JPL
272844	2006 BN_{29}	—	January 23, 2006	Mount Nyukasa	Japan Aerospace Exploration Agency	·	1.5 km	MPC · JPL
272845	2006 BR_{29}	—	January 23, 2006	Mount Nyukasa	Japan Aerospace Exploration Agency	(21344)	2.0 km	MPC · JPL
272846	2006 BK_{31}	—	January 20, 2006	Kitt Peak	Spacewatch	·	2.1 km	MPC · JPL
272847	2006 BP_{31}	—	January 20, 2006	Kitt Peak	Spacewatch	·	2.9 km	MPC · JPL
272848	2006 BF_{32}	—	January 20, 2006	Kitt Peak	Spacewatch	·	3.1 km	MPC · JPL
272849	2006 BW_{33}	—	January 21, 2006	Kitt Peak	Spacewatch	615	1.8 km	MPC · JPL
272850	2006 BB_{34}	—	January 21, 2006	Kitt Peak	Spacewatch	·	3.1 km	MPC · JPL
272851	2006 BF_{34}	—	January 21, 2006	Kitt Peak	Spacewatch	·	3.8 km	MPC · JPL
272852	2006 BN_{38}	—	January 23, 2006	Mount Lemmon	Mount Lemmon Survey	·	2.5 km	MPC · JPL
272853	2006 BH_{39}	—	January 24, 2006	Mount Nyukasa	Japan Aerospace Exploration Agency	·	2.4 km	MPC · JPL
272854	2006 BK_{40}	—	January 21, 2006	Kitt Peak	Spacewatch	·	2.1 km	MPC · JPL
272855	2006 BM_{43}	—	January 23, 2006	Kitt Peak	Spacewatch	·	2.6 km	MPC · JPL
272856	2006 BR_{43}	—	January 23, 2006	Catalina	CSS	·	2.9 km	MPC · JPL
272857	2006 BC_{46}	—	January 23, 2006	Mount Lemmon	Mount Lemmon Survey	·	4.7 km	MPC · JPL
272858	2006 BL_{47}	—	January 25, 2006	Mount Lemmon	Mount Lemmon Survey	·	2.6 km	MPC · JPL
272859	2006 BO_{50}	—	January 25, 2006	Kitt Peak	Spacewatch	EOS	1.9 km	MPC · JPL
272860	2006 BN_{56}	—	January 22, 2006	Anderson Mesa	LONEOS	·	2.9 km	MPC · JPL
272861	2006 BW_{57}	—	January 23, 2006	Catalina	CSS	·	3.3 km	MPC · JPL
272862	2006 BQ_{60}	—	January 26, 2006	Kitt Peak	Spacewatch	EOS	2.3 km	MPC · JPL
272863	2006 BX_{68}	—	January 23, 2006	Kitt Peak	Spacewatch	AEO	2.3 km	MPC · JPL
272864	2006 BZ_{68}	—	January 23, 2006	Kitt Peak	Spacewatch	·	3.4 km	MPC · JPL
272865	2006 BG_{69}	—	January 23, 2006	Kitt Peak	Spacewatch	·	1.8 km	MPC · JPL
272866	2006 BU_{70}	—	January 23, 2006	Kitt Peak	Spacewatch	·	3.1 km	MPC · JPL
272867	2006 BD_{71}	—	January 23, 2006	Kitt Peak	Spacewatch	EMA	5.6 km	MPC · JPL
272868	2006 BF_{80}	—	January 23, 2006	Kitt Peak	Spacewatch	·	3.0 km	MPC · JPL
272869	2006 BO_{80}	—	January 23, 2006	Kitt Peak	Spacewatch	·	2.8 km	MPC · JPL
272870	2006 BS_{80}	—	January 23, 2006	Kitt Peak	Spacewatch	·	3.1 km	MPC · JPL
272871	2006 BE_{81}	—	January 23, 2006	Kitt Peak	Spacewatch	·	2.1 km	MPC · JPL
272872	2006 BY_{81}	—	January 23, 2006	Kitt Peak	Spacewatch	·	2.4 km	MPC · JPL
272873	2006 BQ_{82}	—	January 24, 2006	Kitt Peak	Spacewatch	·	2.0 km	MPC · JPL
272874	2006 BC_{83}	—	January 24, 2006	Socorro	LINEAR	·	4.6 km	MPC · JPL
272875	2006 BJ_{85}	—	January 25, 2006	Kitt Peak	Spacewatch	·	1.8 km	MPC · JPL
272876	2006 BB_{92}	—	January 26, 2006	Mount Lemmon	Mount Lemmon Survey	·	3.4 km	MPC · JPL
272877	2006 BL_{94}	—	January 26, 2006	Kitt Peak	Spacewatch	·	4.5 km	MPC · JPL
272878	2006 BP_{94}	—	January 26, 2006	Kitt Peak	Spacewatch	KOR	1.6 km	MPC · JPL
272879	2006 BB_{95}	—	January 26, 2006	Kitt Peak	Spacewatch	·	2.1 km	MPC · JPL
272880	2006 BH_{95}	—	January 26, 2006	Kitt Peak	Spacewatch	·	2.6 km	MPC · JPL
272881	2006 BY_{96}	—	January 26, 2006	Mount Lemmon	Mount Lemmon Survey	·	2.6 km	MPC · JPL
272882	2006 BB_{97}	—	January 26, 2006	Mount Lemmon	Mount Lemmon Survey	·	2.2 km	MPC · JPL
272883	2006 BC_{98}	—	January 27, 2006	Mount Lemmon	Mount Lemmon Survey	·	2.0 km	MPC · JPL
272884	2006 BQ_{99}	—	January 18, 2006	Catalina	CSS	·	2.3 km	MPC · JPL
272885	2006 BW_{102}	—	January 23, 2006	Mount Lemmon	Mount Lemmon Survey	HOF	2.8 km	MPC · JPL
272886	2006 BC_{110}	—	January 25, 2006	Kitt Peak	Spacewatch	·	3.0 km	MPC · JPL
272887	2006 BH_{110}	—	January 25, 2006	Kitt Peak	Spacewatch	(12739)	2.5 km	MPC · JPL
272888	2006 BE_{117}	—	January 26, 2006	Kitt Peak	Spacewatch	·	2.3 km	MPC · JPL
272889	2006 BK_{118}	—	January 26, 2006	Kitt Peak	Spacewatch	GEF	1.3 km	MPC · JPL
272890	2006 BW_{118}	—	January 26, 2006	Mount Lemmon	Mount Lemmon Survey	·	1.5 km	MPC · JPL
272891	2006 BW_{122}	—	January 26, 2006	Kitt Peak	Spacewatch	·	3.5 km	MPC · JPL
272892	2006 BJ_{123}	—	January 26, 2006	Kitt Peak	Spacewatch	AST	3.0 km	MPC · JPL
272893	2006 BR_{124}	—	January 26, 2006	Kitt Peak	Spacewatch	AGN	1.4 km	MPC · JPL
272894	2006 BB_{125}	—	January 26, 2006	Kitt Peak	Spacewatch	·	1.8 km	MPC · JPL
272895	2006 BF_{125}	—	January 26, 2006	Kitt Peak	Spacewatch	·	2.6 km	MPC · JPL
272896	2006 BC_{133}	—	January 26, 2006	Kitt Peak	Spacewatch	·	2.8 km	MPC · JPL
272897	2006 BG_{133}	—	January 26, 2006	Kitt Peak	Spacewatch	·	2.3 km	MPC · JPL
272898	2006 BY_{141}	—	January 26, 2006	Kitt Peak	Spacewatch	KOR	1.8 km	MPC · JPL
272899	2006 BS_{142}	—	January 26, 2006	Mount Lemmon	Mount Lemmon Survey	HOF	3.4 km	MPC · JPL
272900	2006 BH_{149}	—	January 23, 2006	Socorro	LINEAR	·	3.2 km	MPC · JPL

== 272901–273000 ==
back to top

Designation			Discovery			Properties		Ref
Permanent	Provisional	Named after	Date	Site	Discoverer(s)	Category	Diam.	Ref
272901	2006 BY_{149}	—	January 24, 2006	Anderson Mesa	LONEOS	ADE	3.0 km	MPC · JPL
272902	2006 BR_{152}	—	January 25, 2006	Kitt Peak	Spacewatch	·	2.5 km	MPC · JPL
272903	2006 BD_{155}	—	January 25, 2006	Kitt Peak	Spacewatch	·	1.6 km	MPC · JPL
272904	2006 BM_{155}	—	January 25, 2006	Kitt Peak	Spacewatch	·	2.7 km	MPC · JPL
272905	2006 BM_{158}	—	January 25, 2006	Kitt Peak	Spacewatch	·	1.6 km	MPC · JPL
272906	2006 BY_{159}	—	January 26, 2006	Kitt Peak	Spacewatch	·	2.2 km	MPC · JPL
272907	2006 BK_{160}	—	January 26, 2006	Catalina	CSS	·	4.8 km	MPC · JPL
272908	2006 BO_{160}	—	January 26, 2006	Catalina	CSS	(13314)	3.0 km	MPC · JPL
272909	2006 BG_{161}	—	January 26, 2006	Kitt Peak	Spacewatch	·	3.1 km	MPC · JPL
272910	2006 BY_{161}	—	January 26, 2006	Catalina	CSS	(13314)	2.7 km	MPC · JPL
272911	2006 BS_{163}	—	January 26, 2006	Mount Lemmon	Mount Lemmon Survey	GEF	1.6 km	MPC · JPL
272912	2006 BE_{165}	—	January 26, 2006	Kitt Peak	Spacewatch	·	2.6 km	MPC · JPL
272913	2006 BA_{166}	—	January 26, 2006	Mount Lemmon	Mount Lemmon Survey	·	1.8 km	MPC · JPL
272914	2006 BD_{166}	—	January 26, 2006	Mount Lemmon	Mount Lemmon Survey	·	2.0 km	MPC · JPL
272915	2006 BQ_{172}	—	January 27, 2006	Kitt Peak	Spacewatch	·	1.4 km	MPC · JPL
272916	2006 BL_{179}	—	January 27, 2006	Mount Lemmon	Mount Lemmon Survey	·	2.4 km	MPC · JPL
272917	2006 BR_{180}	—	January 27, 2006	Mount Lemmon	Mount Lemmon Survey	EOS	2.2 km	MPC · JPL
272918	2006 BX_{185}	—	January 28, 2006	Mount Lemmon	Mount Lemmon Survey	AGN	1.3 km	MPC · JPL
272919	2006 BF_{190}	—	January 28, 2006	Kitt Peak	Spacewatch	·	2.3 km	MPC · JPL
272920	2006 BW_{191}	—	January 30, 2006	Kitt Peak	Spacewatch	·	2.8 km	MPC · JPL
272921	2006 BR_{193}	—	January 30, 2006	Kitt Peak	Spacewatch	·	2.8 km	MPC · JPL
272922	2006 BB_{196}	—	January 30, 2006	Kitt Peak	Spacewatch	AGN	1.6 km	MPC · JPL
272923	2006 BT_{198}	—	January 30, 2006	Catalina	CSS	·	2.9 km	MPC · JPL
272924	2006 BX_{199}	—	January 30, 2006	Kitt Peak	Spacewatch	·	1.9 km	MPC · JPL
272925	2006 BS_{200}	—	January 31, 2006	Kitt Peak	Spacewatch	HOF	2.6 km	MPC · JPL
272926	2006 BT_{207}	—	January 31, 2006	Catalina	CSS	·	3.2 km	MPC · JPL
272927	2006 BG_{211}	—	January 31, 2006	Kitt Peak	Spacewatch	THM	2.4 km	MPC · JPL
272928	2006 BK_{212}	—	January 31, 2006	Kitt Peak	Spacewatch	KOR	1.5 km	MPC · JPL
272929	2006 BN_{212}	—	January 30, 2006	BlackBird	Levin, K.	·	1.8 km	MPC · JPL
272930	2006 BC_{220}	—	January 30, 2006	Kitt Peak	Spacewatch	·	2.8 km	MPC · JPL
272931	2006 BV_{222}	—	January 30, 2006	Kitt Peak	Spacewatch	(12739)	2.1 km	MPC · JPL
272932	2006 BJ_{223}	—	January 30, 2006	Kitt Peak	Spacewatch	·	2.8 km	MPC · JPL
272933	2006 BD_{225}	—	January 30, 2006	Kitt Peak	Spacewatch	·	2.3 km	MPC · JPL
272934	2006 BZ_{236}	—	January 31, 2006	Kitt Peak	Spacewatch	(12739)	2.4 km	MPC · JPL
272935	2006 BU_{240}	—	January 31, 2006	Kitt Peak	Spacewatch	GEF	1.8 km	MPC · JPL
272936	2006 BS_{245}	—	January 31, 2006	Kitt Peak	Spacewatch	AST	2.5 km	MPC · JPL
272937	2006 BR_{247}	—	January 31, 2006	Kitt Peak	Spacewatch	·	2.0 km	MPC · JPL
272938	2006 BV_{256}	—	January 31, 2006	Kitt Peak	Spacewatch	PAD	2.0 km	MPC · JPL
272939	2006 BZ_{265}	—	January 31, 2006	Mount Lemmon	Mount Lemmon Survey	H	940 m	MPC · JPL
272940	2006 BQ_{270}	—	January 31, 2006	Catalina	CSS	·	3.2 km	MPC · JPL
272941	2006 BS_{271}	—	January 23, 2006	Mount Lemmon	Mount Lemmon Survey	(5)	1.6 km	MPC · JPL
272942	2006 BU_{276}	—	January 23, 2006	Kitt Peak	Spacewatch	·	2.7 km	MPC · JPL
272943	2006 BW_{276}	—	January 25, 2006	Kitt Peak	Spacewatch	·	1.9 km	MPC · JPL
272944	2006 BJ_{277}	—	January 21, 2006	Kitt Peak	Spacewatch	·	3.8 km	MPC · JPL
272945	2006 BT_{278}	—	January 27, 2006	Mount Lemmon	Mount Lemmon Survey	KOR	1.5 km	MPC · JPL
272946	2006 BL_{279}	—	January 26, 2006	Mount Lemmon	Mount Lemmon Survey	HOF	3.3 km	MPC · JPL
272947	2006 BS_{279}	—	January 21, 2006	Mount Lemmon	Mount Lemmon Survey	EOS	2.0 km	MPC · JPL
272948	2006 BS_{280}	—	January 21, 2006	Kitt Peak	Spacewatch	·	2.9 km	MPC · JPL
272949	2006 BZ_{280}	—	January 25, 2006	Kitt Peak	Spacewatch	HOF	2.9 km	MPC · JPL
272950	2006 BU_{283}	—	January 23, 2006	Kitt Peak	Spacewatch	·	2.8 km	MPC · JPL
272951	2006 CY_{1}	—	February 1, 2006	Kitt Peak	Spacewatch	·	2.0 km	MPC · JPL
272952	2006 CZ_{5}	—	February 1, 2006	Mount Lemmon	Mount Lemmon Survey	MIS	3.4 km	MPC · JPL
272953	2006 CC_{7}	—	February 1, 2006	Mount Lemmon	Mount Lemmon Survey	HOF	3.7 km	MPC · JPL
272954	2006 CK_{7}	—	February 1, 2006	Mount Lemmon	Mount Lemmon Survey	·	3.3 km	MPC · JPL
272955	2006 CC_{11}	—	February 1, 2006	Kitt Peak	Spacewatch	·	2.0 km	MPC · JPL
272956	2006 CK_{15}	—	February 1, 2006	Kitt Peak	Spacewatch	·	2.5 km	MPC · JPL
272957	2006 CF_{18}	—	February 1, 2006	Kitt Peak	Spacewatch	GEF ·	4.2 km	MPC · JPL
272958	2006 CL_{22}	—	February 1, 2006	Mount Lemmon	Mount Lemmon Survey	EOS	2.3 km	MPC · JPL
272959	2006 CP_{29}	—	February 2, 2006	Kitt Peak	Spacewatch	·	1.7 km	MPC · JPL
272960	2006 CU_{29}	—	February 2, 2006	Kitt Peak	Spacewatch	·	2.1 km	MPC · JPL
272961	2006 CZ_{30}	—	February 2, 2006	Kitt Peak	Spacewatch	DOR	2.6 km	MPC · JPL
272962	2006 CE_{38}	—	February 2, 2006	Kitt Peak	Spacewatch	·	2.7 km	MPC · JPL
272963	2006 CR_{48}	—	February 3, 2006	Kitt Peak	Spacewatch	·	2.0 km	MPC · JPL
272964	2006 CO_{56}	—	February 4, 2006	Mount Lemmon	Mount Lemmon Survey	·	2.8 km	MPC · JPL
272965	2006 CW_{57}	—	February 5, 2006	Kitt Peak	Spacewatch	·	1.6 km	MPC · JPL
272966	2006 CP_{59}	—	February 6, 2006	Mount Lemmon	Mount Lemmon Survey	·	2.3 km	MPC · JPL
272967	2006 CT_{60}	—	February 4, 2006	Catalina	CSS	·	3.0 km	MPC · JPL
272968	2006 CJ_{65}	—	February 1, 2006	Mount Lemmon	Mount Lemmon Survey	KOR	1.5 km	MPC · JPL
272969	2006 DT_{1}	—	February 20, 2006	Kitt Peak	Spacewatch	(12739)	2.4 km	MPC · JPL
272970	2006 DC_{3}	—	February 20, 2006	Catalina	CSS	AGN	1.8 km	MPC · JPL
272971	2006 DF_{3}	—	February 20, 2006	Kitt Peak	Spacewatch	KOR	1.4 km	MPC · JPL
272972	2006 DY_{3}	—	February 20, 2006	Catalina	CSS	·	2.7 km	MPC · JPL
272973	2006 DB_{7}	—	February 20, 2006	Mount Lemmon	Mount Lemmon Survey	·	2.2 km	MPC · JPL
272974	2006 DU_{8}	—	February 21, 2006	Catalina	CSS	·	3.2 km	MPC · JPL
272975	2006 DW_{10}	—	February 21, 2006	Catalina	CSS	·	4.0 km	MPC · JPL
272976	2006 DE_{12}	—	February 20, 2006	Mount Lemmon	Mount Lemmon Survey	·	2.3 km	MPC · JPL
272977	2006 DM_{20}	—	February 20, 2006	Kitt Peak	Spacewatch	·	2.3 km	MPC · JPL
272978	2006 DC_{21}	—	February 20, 2006	Mount Lemmon	Mount Lemmon Survey	·	2.7 km	MPC · JPL
272979	2006 DF_{22}	—	February 20, 2006	Kitt Peak	Spacewatch	·	2.4 km	MPC · JPL
272980	2006 DL_{22}	—	February 20, 2006	Kitt Peak	Spacewatch	·	2.4 km	MPC · JPL
272981	2006 DE_{25}	—	February 20, 2006	Kitt Peak	Spacewatch	HOF	3.3 km	MPC · JPL
272982	2006 DG_{25}	—	February 20, 2006	Kitt Peak	Spacewatch	·	2.8 km	MPC · JPL
272983	2006 DZ_{25}	—	February 20, 2006	Kitt Peak	Spacewatch	AST	2.0 km	MPC · JPL
272984	2006 DG_{26}	—	February 20, 2006	Mount Lemmon	Mount Lemmon Survey	·	4.5 km	MPC · JPL
272985	2006 DB_{27}	—	February 20, 2006	Kitt Peak	Spacewatch	·	2.5 km	MPC · JPL
272986	2006 DK_{28}	—	February 20, 2006	Kitt Peak	Spacewatch	·	3.0 km	MPC · JPL
272987	2006 DC_{29}	—	February 20, 2006	Kitt Peak	Spacewatch	·	2.6 km	MPC · JPL
272988	2006 DF_{35}	—	February 20, 2006	Kitt Peak	Spacewatch	EOS	1.9 km	MPC · JPL
272989	2006 DL_{35}	—	February 20, 2006	Mount Lemmon	Mount Lemmon Survey	KOR	1.7 km	MPC · JPL
272990	2006 DM_{39}	—	February 21, 2006	Mount Lemmon	Mount Lemmon Survey	·	2.4 km	MPC · JPL
272991	2006 DJ_{41}	—	February 23, 2006	Anderson Mesa	LONEOS	·	3.7 km	MPC · JPL
272992	2006 DP_{44}	—	February 20, 2006	Catalina	CSS	·	2.9 km	MPC · JPL
272993	2006 DU_{44}	—	February 20, 2006	Kitt Peak	Spacewatch	·	2.0 km	MPC · JPL
272994	2006 DG_{46}	—	February 20, 2006	Kitt Peak	Spacewatch	KOR	1.8 km	MPC · JPL
272995	2006 DT_{48}	—	February 21, 2006	Mount Lemmon	Mount Lemmon Survey	·	2.9 km	MPC · JPL
272996	2006 DE_{49}	—	February 21, 2006	Catalina	CSS	GEF	1.7 km	MPC · JPL
272997	2006 DS_{53}	—	February 24, 2006	Mount Lemmon	Mount Lemmon Survey	(12739)	2.0 km	MPC · JPL
272998	2006 DV_{53}	—	February 24, 2006	Mount Lemmon	Mount Lemmon Survey	·	1.8 km	MPC · JPL
272999	2006 DP_{60}	—	February 24, 2006	Kitt Peak	Spacewatch	·	1.9 km	MPC · JPL
273000	2006 DA_{64}	—	February 20, 2006	Catalina	CSS	KOR	1.9 km	MPC · JPL

back to top

== See also ==
- Meanings of minor-planet names: 272001–273000
