= List of minor planets: 271001–272000 =

The following is a partial list of minor planets, running from minor-planet number 271001 through 272000, inclusive. The primary data for this and other partial lists is based on JPL's "Small-Body Orbital Elements" and data available from the Minor Planet Center. Critical list information is also provided by the MPC, unless otherwise specified from Lowell Observatory. A detailed description of the table's columns and additional sources are given on the main page including a complete list of every page in this series, and a statistical break-up on the dynamical classification of minor planets.

Also see the summary list of all named bodies in numerical and alphabetical order, and the corresponding naming citations for the number range of this particular list. New namings may only be added to this list after official publication, as the preannouncement of names is condemned by the Working Group for Small Bodies Nomenclature of the International Astronomical Union.

Near-Earth obj.	MBA (inner)	MBA (outer)	Centaur
Mars-crosser	MBA (middle)	Jupiter trojan	Trans-Neptunian obj.
Unclassified

== 271001–271100 ==
Designation			Discovery			Properties		Ref
Permanent	Provisional	Named after	Date	Site	Discoverer(s)	Category	Diam.	Ref
271001	2002 XK_{74}	—	December 11, 2002	Socorro	LINEAR	·	1.3 km	MPC · JPL
271002	2002 XB_{75}	—	December 11, 2002	Socorro	LINEAR	·	1.4 km	MPC · JPL
271003	2002 XC_{86}	—	December 11, 2002	Socorro	LINEAR	EUN	1.7 km	MPC · JPL
271004	2002 XE_{87}	—	December 11, 2002	Socorro	LINEAR	·	1.6 km	MPC · JPL
271005	2002 XN_{94}	—	December 2, 2002	Socorro	LINEAR	·	1.3 km	MPC · JPL
271006	2002 XA_{115}	—	December 3, 2002	Palomar	NEAT	V	790 m	MPC · JPL
271007	2002 XF_{117}	—	December 10, 2002	Palomar	NEAT	NYS	1.5 km	MPC · JPL
271008	2002 YM_{2}	—	December 28, 2002	Pla D'Arguines	D'Arguines, Pla	·	1.5 km	MPC · JPL
271009 Reitterferenc	2002 YE_{3}	Reitterferenc	December 25, 2002	Piszkéstető	K. Sárneczky	MAS	930 m	MPC · JPL
271010	2002 YE_{6}	—	December 28, 2002	Kitt Peak	Spacewatch	·	1.6 km	MPC · JPL
271011	2002 YT_{9}	—	December 31, 2002	Socorro	LINEAR	·	2.3 km	MPC · JPL
271012	2002 YR_{17}	—	December 31, 2002	Socorro	LINEAR	·	1.7 km	MPC · JPL
271013	2002 YN_{29}	—	December 31, 2002	Socorro	LINEAR	·	2.3 km	MPC · JPL
271014	2002 YO_{30}	—	December 31, 2002	Socorro	LINEAR	·	1.4 km	MPC · JPL
271015	2003 AW	—	January 1, 2003	Socorro	LINEAR	·	1.6 km	MPC · JPL
271016	2003 AF_{2}	—	January 2, 2003	Socorro	LINEAR	·	2.9 km	MPC · JPL
271017	2003 AV_{10}	—	January 1, 2003	Socorro	LINEAR	·	1.7 km	MPC · JPL
271018	2003 AV_{15}	—	January 4, 2003	Socorro	LINEAR	V	940 m	MPC · JPL
271019	2003 AY_{16}	—	December 11, 2002	Socorro	LINEAR	H	770 m	MPC · JPL
271020	2003 AT_{20}	—	January 5, 2003	Socorro	LINEAR	·	2.1 km	MPC · JPL
271021	2003 AB_{40}	—	January 7, 2003	Socorro	LINEAR	·	1.7 km	MPC · JPL
271022	2003 AP_{44}	—	January 5, 2003	Socorro	LINEAR	·	1.8 km	MPC · JPL
271023	2003 AD_{46}	—	January 5, 2003	Socorro	LINEAR	·	1.8 km	MPC · JPL
271024	2003 AL_{54}	—	January 5, 2003	Socorro	LINEAR	·	2.1 km	MPC · JPL
271025	2003 AQ_{64}	—	January 7, 2003	Socorro	LINEAR	·	1.8 km	MPC · JPL
271026	2003 AP_{73}	—	January 9, 2003	Socorro	LINEAR	·	1.3 km	MPC · JPL
271027	2003 AJ_{81}	—	January 10, 2003	Socorro	LINEAR	PHO	1.4 km	MPC · JPL
271028	2003 AC_{88}	—	January 2, 2003	Socorro	LINEAR	·	1.5 km	MPC · JPL
271029	2003 BU_{30}	—	January 27, 2003	Socorro	LINEAR	·	2.0 km	MPC · JPL
271030	2003 BX_{30}	—	January 27, 2003	Socorro	LINEAR	NYS	1.3 km	MPC · JPL
271031	2003 BD_{31}	—	January 27, 2003	Socorro	LINEAR	·	1.8 km	MPC · JPL
271032	2003 BW_{34}	—	January 27, 2003	Socorro	LINEAR	·	1.4 km	MPC · JPL
271033	2003 BO_{49}	—	January 27, 2003	Anderson Mesa	LONEOS	·	1.5 km	MPC · JPL
271034	2003 BZ_{49}	—	January 27, 2003	Socorro	LINEAR	V	1.0 km	MPC · JPL
271035	2003 BY_{56}	—	January 27, 2003	Socorro	LINEAR	NYS	1.3 km	MPC · JPL
271036	2003 BV_{78}	—	January 31, 2003	Palomar	NEAT	·	1.8 km	MPC · JPL
271037	2003 CQ_{3}	—	February 2, 2003	Anderson Mesa	LONEOS	H	1.0 km	MPC · JPL
271038	2003 CT_{10}	—	February 3, 2003	Palomar	NEAT	·	1.6 km	MPC · JPL
271039	2003 DD_{5}	—	February 19, 2003	Palomar	NEAT	·	2.0 km	MPC · JPL
271040	2003 DA_{17}	—	February 21, 2003	Palomar	NEAT	·	2.1 km	MPC · JPL
271041	2003 EY_{3}	—	March 5, 2003	Socorro	LINEAR	H	770 m	MPC · JPL
271042	2003 FC_{3}	—	March 24, 2003	Socorro	LINEAR	H	820 m	MPC · JPL
271043	2003 FP_{4}	—	March 26, 2003	Socorro	LINEAR	H	850 m	MPC · JPL
271044	2003 FK_{6}	—	March 27, 2003	Campo Imperatore	CINEOS	EUN	1.7 km	MPC · JPL
271045	2003 FR_{8}	—	March 31, 2003	Socorro	LINEAR	H	620 m	MPC · JPL
271046	2003 FT_{8}	—	March 31, 2003	Socorro	LINEAR	H	770 m	MPC · JPL
271047	2003 FU_{8}	—	March 31, 2003	Socorro	LINEAR	H	920 m	MPC · JPL
271048	2003 FN_{9}	—	March 21, 2003	Palomar	NEAT	·	3.0 km	MPC · JPL
271049	2003 FW_{25}	—	March 24, 2003	Kitt Peak	Spacewatch	·	1.8 km	MPC · JPL
271050	2003 FW_{33}	—	March 23, 2003	Kitt Peak	Spacewatch	·	2.0 km	MPC · JPL
271051	2003 FY_{68}	—	March 26, 2003	Palomar	NEAT	·	1.4 km	MPC · JPL
271052	2003 FQ_{74}	—	March 26, 2003	Palomar	NEAT	BRG	1.8 km	MPC · JPL
271053	2003 FW_{131}	—	March 24, 2003	Kitt Peak	Spacewatch	·	2.1 km	MPC · JPL
271054	2003 GU	—	April 1, 2003	Socorro	LINEAR	H	640 m	MPC · JPL
271055	2003 GB_{5}	—	April 1, 2003	Socorro	LINEAR	·	1.6 km	MPC · JPL
271056	2003 GP_{8}	—	April 3, 2003	Anderson Mesa	LONEOS	H	800 m	MPC · JPL
271057	2003 GH_{34}	—	April 5, 2003	Anderson Mesa	LONEOS	·	2.6 km	MPC · JPL
271058	2003 GC_{36}	—	April 5, 2003	Anderson Mesa	LONEOS	·	3.0 km	MPC · JPL
271059	2003 GG_{45}	—	April 8, 2003	Palomar	NEAT	·	1.9 km	MPC · JPL
271060	2003 GZ_{48}	—	April 8, 2003	Kitt Peak	Spacewatch	·	1.9 km	MPC · JPL
271061	2003 GR_{56}	—	April 11, 2003	Kitt Peak	Spacewatch	·	1.5 km	MPC · JPL
271062	2003 HF_{13}	—	April 24, 2003	Kitt Peak	Spacewatch	·	1.2 km	MPC · JPL
271063	2003 HX_{15}	—	April 27, 2003	Socorro	LINEAR	·	2.3 km	MPC · JPL
271064	2003 HJ_{17}	—	April 25, 2003	Anderson Mesa	LONEOS	EUN	1.7 km	MPC · JPL
271065	2003 HF_{19}	—	April 26, 2003	Kitt Peak	Spacewatch	·	1.2 km	MPC · JPL
271066	2003 HP_{27}	—	April 27, 2003	Socorro	LINEAR	H ·	870 m	MPC · JPL
271067	2003 HF_{44}	—	April 27, 2003	Anderson Mesa	LONEOS	(5)	1.3 km	MPC · JPL
271068	2003 JN_{2}	—	May 1, 2003	Kitt Peak	Spacewatch	H	740 m	MPC · JPL
271069	2003 JH_{4}	—	May 2, 2003	Socorro	LINEAR	H	870 m	MPC · JPL
271070	2003 JC_{5}	—	May 1, 2003	Socorro	LINEAR	fast	1.3 km	MPC · JPL
271071	2003 JN_{8}	—	May 2, 2003	Socorro	LINEAR	MAR	1.5 km	MPC · JPL
271072	2003 KZ_{6}	—	May 22, 2003	Kitt Peak	Spacewatch	·	1.9 km	MPC · JPL
271073	2003 KU_{13}	—	May 28, 2003	Haleakala	NEAT	·	2.1 km	MPC · JPL
271074	2003 KB_{32}	—	May 27, 2003	Kitt Peak	Spacewatch	T_{j} (2.98) · HIL · 3:2	6.9 km	MPC · JPL
271075	2003 LS_{4}	—	June 5, 2003	Kitt Peak	Spacewatch	MAR	1.5 km	MPC · JPL
271076	2003 ML_{3}	—	June 25, 2003	Socorro	LINEAR	·	2.7 km	MPC · JPL
271077	2003 MW_{4}	—	June 26, 2003	Socorro	LINEAR	·	1.6 km	MPC · JPL
271078	2003 NU_{4}	—	July 5, 2003	Haleakala	NEAT	·	2.4 km	MPC · JPL
271079	2003 OO_{1}	—	July 21, 2003	Haleakala	NEAT	ADE	3.1 km	MPC · JPL
271080	2003 OU_{7}	—	July 25, 2003	Palomar	NEAT	·	2.4 km	MPC · JPL
271081	2003 OF_{10}	—	July 25, 2003	Socorro	LINEAR	V	800 m	MPC · JPL
271082	2003 OB_{12}	—	July 22, 2003	Palomar	NEAT	·	2.0 km	MPC · JPL
271083	2003 ON_{23}	—	July 22, 2003	Campo Imperatore	CINEOS	AGN	1.4 km	MPC · JPL
271084	2003 PE_{8}	—	August 2, 2003	Haleakala	NEAT	·	3.6 km	MPC · JPL
271085	2003 QB_{3}	—	August 19, 2003	Campo Imperatore	CINEOS	·	2.8 km	MPC · JPL
271086	2003 QD_{4}	—	August 18, 2003	Campo Imperatore	CINEOS	·	2.3 km	MPC · JPL
271087	2003 QL_{7}	—	August 21, 2003	Palomar	NEAT	·	2.0 km	MPC · JPL
271088	2003 QR_{7}	—	August 21, 2003	Palomar	NEAT	·	4.3 km	MPC · JPL
271089	2003 QO_{13}	—	August 22, 2003	Palomar	NEAT	·	3.3 km	MPC · JPL
271090	2003 QC_{16}	—	August 20, 2003	Palomar	NEAT	GEF	1.3 km	MPC · JPL
271091	2003 QA_{20}	—	August 22, 2003	Palomar	NEAT	·	2.7 km	MPC · JPL
271092	2003 QE_{21}	—	August 22, 2003	Palomar	NEAT	·	3.6 km	MPC · JPL
271093	2003 QR_{22}	—	August 20, 2003	Palomar	NEAT	·	4.5 km	MPC · JPL
271094	2003 QT_{26}	—	August 22, 2003	Haleakala	NEAT	·	3.7 km	MPC · JPL
271095	2003 QD_{27}	—	August 22, 2003	Campo Imperatore	CINEOS	·	860 m	MPC · JPL
271096	2003 QH_{31}	—	August 20, 2003	Saint-Sulpice	Saint-Sulpice	·	2.6 km	MPC · JPL
271097	2003 QA_{72}	—	August 26, 2003	Socorro	LINEAR	·	2.7 km	MPC · JPL
271098	2003 QJ_{75}	—	August 24, 2003	Socorro	LINEAR	GEF	1.9 km	MPC · JPL
271099	2003 QB_{78}	—	August 24, 2003	Socorro	LINEAR	·	3.1 km	MPC · JPL
271100	2003 QZ_{92}	—	August 27, 2003	Palomar	NEAT	·	3.0 km	MPC · JPL

== 271101–271200 ==
back to top

Designation			Discovery			Properties		Ref
Permanent	Provisional	Named after	Date	Site	Discoverer(s)	Category	Diam.	Ref
271101	2003 QF_{94}	—	August 28, 2003	Haleakala	NEAT	·	2.4 km	MPC · JPL
271102	2003 QD_{96}	—	August 30, 2003	Haleakala	NEAT	·	4.0 km	MPC · JPL
271103	2003 QZ_{98}	—	August 30, 2003	Kitt Peak	Spacewatch	·	2.4 km	MPC · JPL
271104	2003 QV_{100}	—	August 28, 2003	Haleakala	NEAT	·	1.0 km	MPC · JPL
271105	2003 QT_{101}	—	August 29, 2003	Haleakala	NEAT	·	3.1 km	MPC · JPL
271106	2003 QL_{114}	—	August 23, 2003	Campo Imperatore	CINEOS	·	3.1 km	MPC · JPL
271107	2003 RK	—	September 2, 2003	Haleakala	NEAT	·	3.1 km	MPC · JPL
271108	2003 RP_{4}	—	September 3, 2003	Socorro	LINEAR	·	5.0 km	MPC · JPL
271109	2003 RV_{10}	—	September 13, 2003	Great Shefford	Birtwhistle, P.	BAR	1.6 km	MPC · JPL
271110	2003 RO_{11}	—	September 15, 2003	Wrightwood	J. W. Young	AGN	1.5 km	MPC · JPL
271111	2003 RH_{17}	—	September 15, 2003	Palomar	NEAT	·	2.5 km	MPC · JPL
271112	2003 RK_{18}	—	September 14, 2003	Anderson Mesa	LONEOS	·	2.5 km	MPC · JPL
271113	2003 RR_{22}	—	September 15, 2003	Haleakala	NEAT	·	3.4 km	MPC · JPL
271114	2003 RV_{25}	—	September 15, 2003	Palomar	NEAT	·	4.0 km	MPC · JPL
271115	2003 SQ_{2}	—	September 16, 2003	Kitt Peak	Spacewatch	·	2.1 km	MPC · JPL
271116	2003 ST_{2}	—	September 16, 2003	Kitt Peak	Spacewatch	(260) · CYB	3.6 km	MPC · JPL
271117	2003 SP_{5}	—	September 16, 2003	Kitt Peak	Spacewatch	·	2.1 km	MPC · JPL
271118	2003 SB_{6}	—	September 16, 2003	Kitt Peak	Spacewatch	·	3.0 km	MPC · JPL
271119	2003 SE_{8}	—	September 16, 2003	Kitt Peak	Spacewatch	·	860 m	MPC · JPL
271120	2003 ST_{15}	—	September 16, 2003	Kitt Peak	Spacewatch	·	2.4 km	MPC · JPL
271121	2003 SB_{22}	—	September 16, 2003	Kitt Peak	Spacewatch	EOS	2.0 km	MPC · JPL
271122	2003 SB_{30}	—	September 18, 2003	Palomar	NEAT	·	2.6 km	MPC · JPL
271123	2003 SN_{42}	—	September 16, 2003	Anderson Mesa	LONEOS	BRA	2.0 km	MPC · JPL
271124	2003 SM_{43}	—	September 16, 2003	Anderson Mesa	LONEOS	·	2.4 km	MPC · JPL
271125	2003 SK_{47}	—	September 17, 2003	Kvistaberg	Uppsala-DLR Asteroid Survey	·	2.9 km	MPC · JPL
271126	2003 SE_{53}	—	September 19, 2003	Palomar	NEAT	·	990 m	MPC · JPL
271127	2003 SQ_{57}	—	September 16, 2003	Kitt Peak	Spacewatch	·	3.0 km	MPC · JPL
271128	2003 SM_{62}	—	September 17, 2003	Socorro	LINEAR	·	2.6 km	MPC · JPL
271129	2003 SU_{62}	—	September 17, 2003	Kitt Peak	Spacewatch	·	3.6 km	MPC · JPL
271130	2003 SV_{63}	—	September 17, 2003	Campo Imperatore	CINEOS	·	5.3 km	MPC · JPL
271131	2003 SA_{71}	—	September 18, 2003	Kitt Peak	Spacewatch	EOS	2.1 km	MPC · JPL
271132	2003 SJ_{74}	—	September 18, 2003	Kitt Peak	Spacewatch	·	730 m	MPC · JPL
271133	2003 SU_{76}	—	September 19, 2003	Uccle	Uccle	EOS	2.2 km	MPC · JPL
271134	2003 SL_{78}	—	September 19, 2003	Kitt Peak	Spacewatch	·	2.0 km	MPC · JPL
271135	2003 SB_{106}	—	September 20, 2003	Palomar	NEAT	EOS	2.8 km	MPC · JPL
271136	2003 SW_{111}	—	September 19, 2003	Haleakala	NEAT	GEF	1.4 km	MPC · JPL
271137	2003 SS_{113}	—	September 16, 2003	Kitt Peak	Spacewatch	·	2.7 km	MPC · JPL
271138	2003 ST_{118}	—	September 16, 2003	Kitt Peak	Spacewatch	·	2.0 km	MPC · JPL
271139	2003 SX_{123}	—	January 12, 2000	Kitt Peak	Spacewatch	EOS	2.6 km	MPC · JPL
271140	2003 SG_{132}	—	September 19, 2003	Kitt Peak	Spacewatch	·	4.0 km	MPC · JPL
271141	2003 SN_{134}	—	September 18, 2003	Palomar	NEAT	·	2.7 km	MPC · JPL
271142	2003 SL_{139}	—	September 18, 2003	Palomar	NEAT	·	2.9 km	MPC · JPL
271143	2003 SM_{144}	—	September 19, 2003	Palomar	NEAT	·	7.2 km	MPC · JPL
271144	2003 SB_{155}	—	September 19, 2003	Anderson Mesa	LONEOS	·	990 m	MPC · JPL
271145	2003 SV_{158}	—	September 19, 2003	Kitt Peak	Spacewatch	BRA	2.1 km	MPC · JPL
271146	2003 ST_{161}	—	September 18, 2003	Palomar	NEAT	·	5.3 km	MPC · JPL
271147	2003 SF_{162}	—	September 19, 2003	Campo Imperatore	CINEOS	·	4.4 km	MPC · JPL
271148	2003 SW_{164}	—	September 20, 2003	Anderson Mesa	LONEOS	EOS	2.6 km	MPC · JPL
271149	2003 SS_{166}	—	September 21, 2003	Socorro	LINEAR	·	2.5 km	MPC · JPL
271150	2003 SL_{169}	—	September 23, 2003	Haleakala	NEAT	DOR	4.7 km	MPC · JPL
271151	2003 SZ_{169}	—	September 20, 2003	Socorro	LINEAR	·	3.5 km	MPC · JPL
271152	2003 SO_{170}	—	September 22, 2003	Uccle	T. Pauwels	·	890 m	MPC · JPL
271153	2003 SV_{176}	—	September 18, 2003	Palomar	NEAT	EOS	2.3 km	MPC · JPL
271154	2003 SL_{178}	—	September 19, 2003	Palomar	NEAT	·	2.9 km	MPC · JPL
271155	2003 SE_{195}	—	September 20, 2003	Palomar	NEAT	·	810 m	MPC · JPL
271156	2003 SV_{197}	—	September 21, 2003	Anderson Mesa	LONEOS	·	830 m	MPC · JPL
271157	2003 SE_{210}	—	September 26, 2003	Socorro	LINEAR	·	4.5 km	MPC · JPL
271158	2003 SY_{211}	—	September 25, 2003	Palomar	NEAT	DOR	3.1 km	MPC · JPL
271159	2003 SY_{225}	—	September 26, 2003	Socorro	LINEAR	·	3.8 km	MPC · JPL
271160	2003 SQ_{228}	—	September 26, 2003	Socorro	LINEAR	·	2.4 km	MPC · JPL
271161	2003 SC_{229}	—	September 27, 2003	Kitt Peak	Spacewatch	·	2.4 km	MPC · JPL
271162	2003 SS_{230}	—	September 24, 2003	Palomar	NEAT	EOS	2.6 km	MPC · JPL
271163	2003 SK_{231}	—	September 24, 2003	Palomar	NEAT	HOF	3.4 km	MPC · JPL
271164	2003 SW_{235}	—	September 27, 2003	Socorro	LINEAR	EUP	4.1 km	MPC · JPL
271165	2003 SV_{238}	—	September 27, 2003	Socorro	LINEAR	·	3.6 km	MPC · JPL
271166	2003 SE_{243}	—	September 28, 2003	Kitt Peak	Spacewatch	·	1.7 km	MPC · JPL
271167	2003 SS_{250}	—	September 26, 2003	Socorro	LINEAR	·	3.5 km	MPC · JPL
271168	2003 SV_{254}	—	September 27, 2003	Kitt Peak	Spacewatch	EOS	2.3 km	MPC · JPL
271169	2003 SW_{254}	—	September 27, 2003	Kitt Peak	Spacewatch	EOS	2.6 km	MPC · JPL
271170	2003 SM_{260}	—	September 27, 2003	Kitt Peak	Spacewatch	·	2.5 km	MPC · JPL
271171	2003 SF_{264}	—	September 28, 2003	Socorro	LINEAR	·	3.2 km	MPC · JPL
271172	2003 SA_{265}	—	September 28, 2003	Socorro	LINEAR	·	2.4 km	MPC · JPL
271173	2003 SM_{265}	—	September 29, 2003	Kitt Peak	Spacewatch	·	2.4 km	MPC · JPL
271174	2003 SW_{269}	—	September 24, 2003	Haleakala	NEAT	·	970 m	MPC · JPL
271175	2003 SZ_{269}	—	September 24, 2003	Haleakala	NEAT	·	700 m	MPC · JPL
271176	2003 SO_{273}	—	September 28, 2003	Pla D'Arguines	D'Arguines, Pla	·	3.6 km	MPC · JPL
271177	2003 SJ_{275}	—	September 29, 2003	Socorro	LINEAR	·	3.1 km	MPC · JPL
271178	2003 SX_{278}	—	September 30, 2003	Socorro	LINEAR	·	2.7 km	MPC · JPL
271179	2003 SH_{281}	—	September 18, 2003	Campo Imperatore	CINEOS	·	3.2 km	MPC · JPL
271180	2003 SM_{282}	—	September 19, 2003	Anderson Mesa	LONEOS	EOS	2.4 km	MPC · JPL
271181	2003 SZ_{284}	—	September 20, 2003	Socorro	LINEAR	·	3.0 km	MPC · JPL
271182	2003 SA_{285}	—	September 20, 2003	Socorro	LINEAR	·	2.5 km	MPC · JPL
271183	2003 SW_{297}	—	September 18, 2003	Haleakala	NEAT	TIN	920 m	MPC · JPL
271184	2003 SF_{298}	—	September 18, 2003	Haleakala	NEAT	·	2.7 km	MPC · JPL
271185	2003 SP_{300}	—	September 17, 2003	Palomar	NEAT	·	3.3 km	MPC · JPL
271186	2003 ST_{303}	—	September 17, 2003	Palomar	NEAT	·	2.7 km	MPC · JPL
271187	2003 SJ_{304}	—	September 17, 2003	Palomar	NEAT	·	2.5 km	MPC · JPL
271188	2003 SK_{305}	—	September 17, 2003	Palomar	NEAT	·	3.1 km	MPC · JPL
271189	2003 SC_{309}	—	September 30, 2003	Anderson Mesa	LONEOS	·	4.4 km	MPC · JPL
271190	2003 SN_{309}	—	September 27, 2003	Socorro	LINEAR	·	720 m	MPC · JPL
271191	2003 SQ_{310}	—	September 28, 2003	Haleakala	NEAT	EOS	2.8 km	MPC · JPL
271192	2003 SG_{315}	—	September 27, 2003	Anderson Mesa	LONEOS	BRA	2.3 km	MPC · JPL
271193	2003 SH_{320}	—	September 17, 2003	Kitt Peak	Spacewatch	EOS	2.8 km	MPC · JPL
271194	2003 SA_{321}	—	September 19, 2003	Campo Imperatore	CINEOS	·	2.3 km	MPC · JPL
271195	2003 SF_{321}	—	September 19, 2003	Campo Imperatore	CINEOS	KOR	1.6 km	MPC · JPL
271196	2003 SM_{321}	—	September 20, 2003	Palomar	NEAT	·	3.1 km	MPC · JPL
271197	2003 SB_{325}	—	September 17, 2003	Kitt Peak	Spacewatch	·	2.6 km	MPC · JPL
271198	2003 SE_{328}	—	September 20, 2003	Kitt Peak	Spacewatch	·	2.2 km	MPC · JPL
271199	2003 SM_{329}	—	September 22, 2003	Palomar	NEAT	·	2.5 km	MPC · JPL
271200	2003 SO_{329}	—	September 22, 2003	Palomar	NEAT	EOS	2.4 km	MPC · JPL

== 271201–271300 ==
back to top

Designation			Discovery			Properties		Ref
Permanent	Provisional	Named after	Date	Site	Discoverer(s)	Category	Diam.	Ref
271201	2003 SE_{335}	—	September 26, 2003	Apache Point	SDSS	·	3.4 km	MPC · JPL
271202	2003 SS_{352}	—	September 19, 2003	Campo Imperatore	CINEOS	·	2.6 km	MPC · JPL
271203	2003 SX_{354}	—	September 23, 2003	Palomar	NEAT	·	3.3 km	MPC · JPL
271204	2003 SB_{365}	—	September 26, 2003	Apache Point	SDSS	AGN	1.6 km	MPC · JPL
271205	2003 SZ_{376}	—	September 26, 2003	Apache Point	SDSS	EOS	2.4 km	MPC · JPL
271206	2003 SU_{385}	—	September 26, 2003	Apache Point	SDSS	·	3.1 km	MPC · JPL
271207	2003 SQ_{389}	—	September 26, 2003	Apache Point	SDSS	HYG	3.0 km	MPC · JPL
271208	2003 SR_{392}	—	September 26, 2003	Apache Point	SDSS	EOS	2.2 km	MPC · JPL
271209	2003 SW_{395}	—	September 26, 2003	Apache Point	SDSS	VER	3.6 km	MPC · JPL
271210	2003 SW_{410}	—	September 28, 2003	Apache Point	SDSS	·	2.3 km	MPC · JPL
271211	2003 SY_{428}	—	September 19, 2003	Kitt Peak	Spacewatch	(13314)	2.7 km	MPC · JPL
271212	2003 TC	—	October 1, 2003	Wrightwood	Grigsby, A.	·	3.1 km	MPC · JPL
271213	2003 TL_{6}	—	October 1, 2003	Anderson Mesa	LONEOS	TIN	1.6 km	MPC · JPL
271214	2003 TX_{8}	—	October 3, 2003	Haleakala	NEAT	·	3.5 km	MPC · JPL
271215	2003 TT_{12}	—	October 15, 2003	Palomar	NEAT	·	2.7 km	MPC · JPL
271216 Boblambert	2003 TO_{13}	Boblambert	October 14, 2003	New Milford	Milford, New	·	2.7 km	MPC · JPL
271217	2003 TR_{15}	—	October 15, 2003	Anderson Mesa	LONEOS	EMA	4.5 km	MPC · JPL
271218	2003 TV_{18}	—	October 15, 2003	Anderson Mesa	LONEOS	·	4.7 km	MPC · JPL
271219	2003 TH_{20}	—	October 14, 2003	Palomar	NEAT	EOS	2.3 km	MPC · JPL
271220	2003 TA_{29}	—	October 1, 2003	Kitt Peak	Spacewatch	·	1.9 km	MPC · JPL
271221	2003 TM_{35}	—	October 1, 2003	Kitt Peak	Spacewatch	EMA	3.6 km	MPC · JPL
271222	2003 TY_{37}	—	October 2, 2003	Kitt Peak	Spacewatch	EOS	2.8 km	MPC · JPL
271223	2003 TP_{38}	—	October 2, 2003	Kitt Peak	Spacewatch	VER	2.4 km	MPC · JPL
271224	2003 TE_{45}	—	October 3, 2003	Kitt Peak	Spacewatch	·	3.6 km	MPC · JPL
271225	2003 TN_{47}	—	October 3, 2003	Kitt Peak	Spacewatch	EOS	2.3 km	MPC · JPL
271226	2003 TL_{48}	—	October 3, 2003	Kitt Peak	Spacewatch	·	1.8 km	MPC · JPL
271227	2003 TY_{52}	—	October 5, 2003	Kitt Peak	Spacewatch	·	3.4 km	MPC · JPL
271228	2003 TU_{54}	—	October 5, 2003	Kitt Peak	Spacewatch	·	3.7 km	MPC · JPL
271229	2003 TQ_{55}	—	October 5, 2003	Kitt Peak	Spacewatch	·	2.7 km	MPC · JPL
271230	2003 TA_{59}	—	October 2, 2003	Kitt Peak	Spacewatch	EOS ·	4.9 km	MPC · JPL
271231	2003 UE_{13}	—	October 16, 2003	Anderson Mesa	LONEOS	·	4.9 km	MPC · JPL
271232	2003 UZ_{13}	—	October 16, 2003	Kitt Peak	Spacewatch	·	3.3 km	MPC · JPL
271233	2003 UM_{16}	—	October 16, 2003	Anderson Mesa	LONEOS	·	3.2 km	MPC · JPL
271234	2003 UM_{17}	—	October 17, 2003	Anderson Mesa	LONEOS	·	3.7 km	MPC · JPL
271235 Bellay	2003 UX_{17}	Bellay	October 18, 2003	Saint-Sulpice	Saint-Sulpice	KOR	1.8 km	MPC · JPL
271236	2003 UQ_{30}	—	October 16, 2003	Palomar	NEAT	·	2.5 km	MPC · JPL
271237	2003 UZ_{43}	—	October 18, 2003	Kitt Peak	Spacewatch	·	1.7 km	MPC · JPL
271238	2003 UY_{53}	—	October 18, 2003	Palomar	NEAT	·	5.4 km	MPC · JPL
271239	2003 UU_{61}	—	October 16, 2003	Anderson Mesa	LONEOS	·	3.1 km	MPC · JPL
271240	2003 UR_{62}	—	October 16, 2003	Anderson Mesa	LONEOS	·	3.5 km	MPC · JPL
271241	2003 UM_{64}	—	October 16, 2003	Palomar	NEAT	·	3.5 km	MPC · JPL
271242	2003 UP_{65}	—	October 16, 2003	Palomar	NEAT	TEL	1.7 km	MPC · JPL
271243	2003 UK_{71}	—	October 19, 2003	Kitt Peak	Spacewatch	·	2.4 km	MPC · JPL
271244	2003 UM_{71}	—	October 19, 2003	Kitt Peak	Spacewatch	·	2.0 km	MPC · JPL
271245	2003 UM_{73}	—	October 19, 2003	Kitt Peak	Spacewatch	EOS	3.3 km	MPC · JPL
271246	2003 UT_{75}	—	October 17, 2003	Kitt Peak	Spacewatch	·	3.1 km	MPC · JPL
271247	2003 UB_{77}	—	October 17, 2003	Kitt Peak	Spacewatch	·	2.6 km	MPC · JPL
271248	2003 UZ_{77}	—	October 17, 2003	Kitt Peak	Spacewatch	TEL	1.8 km	MPC · JPL
271249	2003 UN_{78}	—	October 18, 2003	Palomar	NEAT	·	3.7 km	MPC · JPL
271250	2003 UG_{80}	—	October 16, 2003	Palomar	NEAT	TEL	1.9 km	MPC · JPL
271251	2003 UE_{92}	—	October 20, 2003	Kitt Peak	Spacewatch	HYG	3.1 km	MPC · JPL
271252	2003 UH_{93}	—	October 17, 2003	Kitt Peak	Spacewatch	·	2.8 km	MPC · JPL
271253	2003 UP_{97}	—	October 19, 2003	Kitt Peak	Spacewatch	·	3.0 km	MPC · JPL
271254	2003 UT_{102}	—	October 20, 2003	Kitt Peak	Spacewatch	·	4.6 km	MPC · JPL
271255	2003 UW_{104}	—	October 18, 2003	Kitt Peak	Spacewatch	·	3.8 km	MPC · JPL
271256	2003 UK_{106}	—	October 18, 2003	Kitt Peak	Spacewatch	EOS	2.5 km	MPC · JPL
271257	2003 UA_{109}	—	October 19, 2003	Kitt Peak	Spacewatch	·	3.9 km	MPC · JPL
271258	2003 UH_{110}	—	October 19, 2003	Kitt Peak	Spacewatch	·	4.0 km	MPC · JPL
271259	2003 UQ_{122}	—	October 19, 2003	Socorro	LINEAR	·	4.4 km	MPC · JPL
271260	2003 UD_{128}	—	October 21, 2003	Kitt Peak	Spacewatch	·	4.3 km	MPC · JPL
271261	2003 UP_{141}	—	October 18, 2003	Anderson Mesa	LONEOS	·	3.1 km	MPC · JPL
271262	2003 UR_{142}	—	October 18, 2003	Anderson Mesa	LONEOS	·	4.9 km	MPC · JPL
271263	2003 UU_{147}	—	October 18, 2003	Palomar	NEAT	·	3.9 km	MPC · JPL
271264	2003 UW_{150}	—	October 21, 2003	Anderson Mesa	LONEOS	THM	3.6 km	MPC · JPL
271265	2003 UU_{158}	—	October 20, 2003	Kitt Peak	Spacewatch	·	5.2 km	MPC · JPL
271266	2003 UA_{168}	—	October 22, 2003	Socorro	LINEAR	·	3.1 km	MPC · JPL
271267	2003 UC_{171}	—	October 19, 2003	Kitt Peak	Spacewatch	·	2.6 km	MPC · JPL
271268	2003 UR_{172}	—	October 20, 2003	Socorro	LINEAR	·	3.3 km	MPC · JPL
271269	2003 UG_{183}	—	October 21, 2003	Palomar	NEAT	TIR	3.9 km	MPC · JPL
271270	2003 UT_{188}	—	October 22, 2003	Kitt Peak	Spacewatch	EOS	2.7 km	MPC · JPL
271271	2003 UW_{190}	—	October 23, 2003	Anderson Mesa	LONEOS	·	950 m	MPC · JPL
271272	2003 UD_{192}	—	October 23, 2003	Anderson Mesa	LONEOS	EOS	3.7 km	MPC · JPL
271273	2003 UG_{198}	—	October 21, 2003	Kitt Peak	Spacewatch	·	3.5 km	MPC · JPL
271274	2003 UQ_{200}	—	October 21, 2003	Socorro	LINEAR	URS	4.2 km	MPC · JPL
271275	2003 UN_{201}	—	October 21, 2003	Socorro	LINEAR	·	2.7 km	MPC · JPL
271276	2003 UD_{209}	—	October 23, 2003	Kitt Peak	Spacewatch	·	2.9 km	MPC · JPL
271277	2003 UY_{210}	—	October 23, 2003	Kitt Peak	Spacewatch	LIX	4.7 km	MPC · JPL
271278	2003 UC_{217}	—	October 21, 2003	Palomar	NEAT	·	2.3 km	MPC · JPL
271279	2003 UQ_{225}	—	October 22, 2003	Socorro	LINEAR	TIR	5.6 km	MPC · JPL
271280	2003 UB_{229}	—	October 23, 2003	Anderson Mesa	LONEOS	·	920 m	MPC · JPL
271281	2003 UD_{232}	—	October 24, 2003	Kitt Peak	Spacewatch	·	4.0 km	MPC · JPL
271282	2003 US_{233}	—	October 24, 2003	Socorro	LINEAR	·	4.3 km	MPC · JPL
271283	2003 UU_{238}	—	October 24, 2003	Socorro	LINEAR	·	4.2 km	MPC · JPL
271284	2003 UP_{240}	—	October 24, 2003	Kitt Peak	Spacewatch	·	2.9 km	MPC · JPL
271285	2003 UU_{244}	—	October 24, 2003	Kitt Peak	Spacewatch	·	4.1 km	MPC · JPL
271286	2003 UF_{245}	—	October 24, 2003	Haleakala	NEAT	·	5.7 km	MPC · JPL
271287	2003 UM_{247}	—	October 24, 2003	Haleakala	NEAT	DOR	4.3 km	MPC · JPL
271288	2003 UD_{257}	—	October 25, 2003	Socorro	LINEAR	·	2.6 km	MPC · JPL
271289	2003 UW_{264}	—	October 27, 2003	Socorro	LINEAR	·	1.0 km	MPC · JPL
271290	2003 UT_{268}	—	October 28, 2003	Socorro	LINEAR	·	2.2 km	MPC · JPL
271291	2003 UA_{270}	—	October 24, 2003	Bergisch Gladbach	W. Bickel	·	2.9 km	MPC · JPL
271292	2003 UA_{271}	—	October 17, 2003	Palomar	NEAT	EOS	2.2 km	MPC · JPL
271293	2003 UB_{272}	—	October 28, 2003	Socorro	LINEAR	EOS	2.5 km	MPC · JPL
271294	2003 UQ_{273}	—	October 29, 2003	Kitt Peak	Spacewatch	·	3.9 km	MPC · JPL
271295	2003 US_{277}	—	October 25, 2003	Socorro	LINEAR	·	2.5 km	MPC · JPL
271296	2003 UD_{278}	—	October 25, 2003	Socorro	LINEAR	EOS	2.3 km	MPC · JPL
271297	2003 UE_{298}	—	October 16, 2003	Kitt Peak	Spacewatch	KOR	1.6 km	MPC · JPL
271298	2003 UD_{299}	—	October 16, 2003	Kitt Peak	Spacewatch	·	2.6 km	MPC · JPL
271299	2003 UC_{304}	—	October 17, 2003	Kitt Peak	Spacewatch	·	4.5 km	MPC · JPL
271300	2003 UC_{318}	—	October 19, 2003	Apache Point	SDSS	·	1.8 km	MPC · JPL

== 271301–271400 ==
back to top

Designation			Discovery			Properties		Ref
Permanent	Provisional	Named after	Date	Site	Discoverer(s)	Category	Diam.	Ref
271301	2003 UY_{321}	—	October 16, 2003	Kitt Peak	Spacewatch	·	720 m	MPC · JPL
271302	2003 UA_{337}	—	October 18, 2003	Apache Point	SDSS	·	1.9 km	MPC · JPL
271303	2003 UH_{338}	—	October 18, 2003	Kitt Peak	Spacewatch	KOR	1.5 km	MPC · JPL
271304	2003 UX_{346}	—	October 19, 2003	Apache Point	SDSS	·	2.9 km	MPC · JPL
271305	2003 UJ_{348}	—	October 19, 2003	Apache Point	SDSS	·	3.0 km	MPC · JPL
271306	2003 UZ_{350}	—	October 19, 2003	Apache Point	SDSS	·	2.8 km	MPC · JPL
271307	2003 UJ_{353}	—	October 19, 2003	Apache Point	SDSS	·	2.7 km	MPC · JPL
271308	2003 UB_{354}	—	October 19, 2003	Apache Point	SDSS	·	1.9 km	MPC · JPL
271309	2003 UZ_{356}	—	October 19, 2003	Kitt Peak	Spacewatch	KOR	1.4 km	MPC · JPL
271310	2003 UH_{402}	—	October 23, 2003	Apache Point	SDSS	EOS	2.0 km	MPC · JPL
271311	2003 UW_{414}	—	October 17, 2003	Kitt Peak	Spacewatch	·	3.6 km	MPC · JPL
271312	2003 VO_{3}	—	November 15, 2003	Kitt Peak	Spacewatch	·	3.2 km	MPC · JPL
271313	2003 VP_{6}	—	November 15, 2003	Kitt Peak	Spacewatch	·	2.0 km	MPC · JPL
271314	2003 WE_{1}	—	November 16, 2003	Catalina	CSS	·	730 m	MPC · JPL
271315	2003 WJ_{4}	—	November 16, 2003	Kitt Peak	Spacewatch	·	1.3 km	MPC · JPL
271316	2003 WW_{4}	—	November 16, 2003	Kitt Peak	Spacewatch	·	3.7 km	MPC · JPL
271317	2003 WG_{5}	—	November 16, 2003	Kitt Peak	Spacewatch	·	2.8 km	MPC · JPL
271318	2003 WR_{6}	—	November 18, 2003	Kitt Peak	Spacewatch	·	3.1 km	MPC · JPL
271319	2003 WV_{9}	—	November 18, 2003	Kitt Peak	Spacewatch	·	1.4 km	MPC · JPL
271320	2003 WE_{12}	—	November 18, 2003	Palomar	NEAT	·	7.5 km	MPC · JPL
271321	2003 WE_{21}	—	November 19, 2003	Socorro	LINEAR	·	2.7 km	MPC · JPL
271322	2003 WQ_{27}	—	November 16, 2003	Kitt Peak	Spacewatch	·	3.6 km	MPC · JPL
271323	2003 WT_{28}	—	November 18, 2003	Kitt Peak	Spacewatch	·	3.3 km	MPC · JPL
271324	2003 WY_{30}	—	November 18, 2003	Kitt Peak	Spacewatch	HYG	3.4 km	MPC · JPL
271325	2003 WD_{31}	—	November 18, 2003	Palomar	NEAT	EOS	2.8 km	MPC · JPL
271326	2003 WC_{33}	—	November 18, 2003	Palomar	NEAT	·	1.1 km	MPC · JPL
271327	2003 WQ_{33}	—	November 18, 2003	Palomar	NEAT	·	3.6 km	MPC · JPL
271328	2003 WV_{35}	—	November 19, 2003	Catalina	CSS	·	2.9 km	MPC · JPL
271329	2003 WL_{39}	—	November 19, 2003	Kitt Peak	Spacewatch	·	3.7 km	MPC · JPL
271330	2003 WS_{41}	—	November 20, 2003	Socorro	LINEAR	·	5.7 km	MPC · JPL
271331	2003 WU_{43}	—	November 19, 2003	Palomar	NEAT	·	4.1 km	MPC · JPL
271332	2003 WS_{46}	—	November 18, 2003	Palomar	NEAT	EOS	4.8 km	MPC · JPL
271333	2003 WZ_{48}	—	November 19, 2003	Kitt Peak	Spacewatch	·	2.2 km	MPC · JPL
271334	2003 WP_{57}	—	November 18, 2003	Kitt Peak	Spacewatch	·	3.0 km	MPC · JPL
271335	2003 WK_{58}	—	November 18, 2003	Kitt Peak	Spacewatch	·	3.3 km	MPC · JPL
271336	2003 WS_{66}	—	November 19, 2003	Palomar	NEAT	·	2.6 km	MPC · JPL
271337	2003 WM_{69}	—	November 19, 2003	Kitt Peak	Spacewatch	·	3.2 km	MPC · JPL
271338	2003 WU_{69}	—	November 19, 2003	Kitt Peak	Spacewatch	VER	5.4 km	MPC · JPL
271339	2003 WJ_{70}	—	November 20, 2003	Kitt Peak	Spacewatch	·	3.0 km	MPC · JPL
271340	2003 WL_{86}	—	November 21, 2003	Socorro	LINEAR	·	3.2 km	MPC · JPL
271341	2003 WH_{94}	—	November 19, 2003	Anderson Mesa	LONEOS	·	3.9 km	MPC · JPL
271342	2003 WE_{99}	—	November 20, 2003	Socorro	LINEAR	EOS	2.4 km	MPC · JPL
271343	2003 WJ_{111}	—	November 20, 2003	Socorro	LINEAR	·	2.9 km	MPC · JPL
271344	2003 WB_{112}	—	November 20, 2003	Socorro	LINEAR	·	4.2 km	MPC · JPL
271345	2003 WL_{134}	—	November 21, 2003	Socorro	LINEAR	BRA	2.3 km	MPC · JPL
271346	2003 WV_{135}	—	November 21, 2003	Socorro	LINEAR	·	1.1 km	MPC · JPL
271347	2003 WC_{138}	—	November 21, 2003	Socorro	LINEAR	·	4.8 km	MPC · JPL
271348	2003 WQ_{146}	—	November 23, 2003	Catalina	CSS	INA	3.9 km	MPC · JPL
271349	2003 WY_{151}	—	November 26, 2003	Kitt Peak	Spacewatch	·	1.4 km	MPC · JPL
271350	2003 WU_{154}	—	November 26, 2003	Kitt Peak	Spacewatch	·	4.9 km	MPC · JPL
271351	2003 WY_{157}	—	November 29, 2003	Socorro	LINEAR	·	5.0 km	MPC · JPL
271352	2003 WE_{160}	—	November 30, 2003	Kitt Peak	Spacewatch	·	2.7 km	MPC · JPL
271353	2003 WT_{160}	—	November 30, 2003	Kitt Peak	Spacewatch	HOF	3.2 km	MPC · JPL
271354	2003 WS_{164}	—	November 30, 2003	Kitt Peak	Spacewatch	THM	2.7 km	MPC · JPL
271355	2003 WF_{192}	—	November 20, 2003	Kitt Peak	Spacewatch	HYG	3.0 km	MPC · JPL
271356	2003 WR_{192}	—	November 24, 2003	Anderson Mesa	LONEOS	·	3.8 km	MPC · JPL
271357	2003 XT_{6}	—	December 3, 2003	Socorro	LINEAR	·	6.2 km	MPC · JPL
271358	2003 XZ_{8}	—	December 4, 2003	Socorro	LINEAR	·	4.3 km	MPC · JPL
271359	2003 XW_{9}	—	December 4, 2003	Socorro	LINEAR	·	6.5 km	MPC · JPL
271360	2003 XB_{16}	—	December 14, 2003	Palomar	NEAT	HYG	2.8 km	MPC · JPL
271361	2003 XJ_{18}	—	December 15, 2003	Socorro	LINEAR	·	3.8 km	MPC · JPL
271362	2003 XK_{29}	—	December 1, 2003	Kitt Peak	Spacewatch	·	6.1 km	MPC · JPL
271363	2003 XV_{32}	—	December 1, 2003	Kitt Peak	Spacewatch	·	3.0 km	MPC · JPL
271364	2003 XW_{34}	—	December 3, 2003	Socorro	LINEAR	·	5.5 km	MPC · JPL
271365	2003 XP_{39}	—	December 5, 2003	Catalina	CSS	·	5.7 km	MPC · JPL
271366	2003 YE	—	December 16, 2003	Socorro	LINEAR	·	830 m	MPC · JPL
271367	2003 YP_{11}	—	December 17, 2003	Socorro	LINEAR	·	3.8 km	MPC · JPL
271368	2003 YU_{17}	—	December 16, 2003	Catalina	CSS	·	930 m	MPC · JPL
271369	2003 YQ_{31}	—	December 18, 2003	Socorro	LINEAR	·	920 m	MPC · JPL
271370	2003 YQ_{39}	—	December 19, 2003	Kitt Peak	Spacewatch	·	920 m	MPC · JPL
271371	2003 YS_{59}	—	December 19, 2003	Kitt Peak	Spacewatch	·	4.8 km	MPC · JPL
271372	2003 YP_{71}	—	December 18, 2003	Socorro	LINEAR	·	4.0 km	MPC · JPL
271373	2003 YA_{82}	—	December 18, 2003	Socorro	LINEAR	·	1.2 km	MPC · JPL
271374	2003 YV_{84}	—	December 19, 2003	Kitt Peak	Spacewatch	·	4.9 km	MPC · JPL
271375	2003 YK_{93}	—	December 21, 2003	Socorro	LINEAR	·	5.8 km	MPC · JPL
271376	2003 YO_{114}	—	December 25, 2003	Haleakala	NEAT	·	3.4 km	MPC · JPL
271377	2003 YR_{116}	—	December 27, 2003	Socorro	LINEAR	·	5.2 km	MPC · JPL
271378	2003 YW_{138}	—	December 27, 2003	Socorro	LINEAR	PHO	1.9 km	MPC · JPL
271379	2003 YS_{152}	—	December 29, 2003	Kitt Peak	Spacewatch	·	4.6 km	MPC · JPL
271380	2003 YK_{160}	—	December 17, 2003	Socorro	LINEAR	·	820 m	MPC · JPL
271381	2003 YM_{161}	—	December 17, 2003	Socorro	LINEAR	·	4.8 km	MPC · JPL
271382	2004 BN	—	January 16, 2004	Kitt Peak	Spacewatch	·	950 m	MPC · JPL
271383	2004 BH_{6}	—	January 16, 2004	Kitt Peak	Spacewatch	·	840 m	MPC · JPL
271384	2004 BM_{12}	—	January 17, 2004	Palomar	NEAT	·	770 m	MPC · JPL
271385	2004 BQ_{15}	—	January 17, 2004	Palomar	NEAT	·	900 m	MPC · JPL
271386	2004 BU_{40}	—	January 21, 2004	Socorro	LINEAR	·	1.3 km	MPC · JPL
271387	2004 BG_{43}	—	January 22, 2004	Socorro	LINEAR	·	940 m	MPC · JPL
271388	2004 BW_{55}	—	January 22, 2004	Socorro	LINEAR	·	730 m	MPC · JPL
271389	2004 BL_{73}	—	January 24, 2004	Socorro	LINEAR	·	840 m	MPC · JPL
271390	2004 BL_{85}	—	January 22, 2004	Socorro	LINEAR	·	2.6 km	MPC · JPL
271391	2004 BR_{87}	—	January 23, 2004	Anderson Mesa	LONEOS	·	800 m	MPC · JPL
271392	2004 BQ_{98}	—	January 27, 2004	Kitt Peak	Spacewatch	·	1.0 km	MPC · JPL
271393	2004 BQ_{151}	—	January 18, 2004	Palomar	NEAT	·	1.0 km	MPC · JPL
271394	2004 BS_{160}	—	January 22, 2004	Mauna Kea	Mauna Kea	·	660 m	MPC · JPL
271395	2004 CU	—	February 10, 2004	Desert Eagle	W. K. Y. Yeung	·	950 m	MPC · JPL
271396	2004 CX_{4}	—	February 10, 2004	Palomar	NEAT	·	1 km	MPC · JPL
271397	2004 CA_{6}	—	February 10, 2004	Palomar	NEAT	·	1.1 km	MPC · JPL
271398	2004 CE_{6}	—	February 10, 2004	Palomar	NEAT	·	920 m	MPC · JPL
271399	2004 CQ_{9}	—	February 11, 2004	Kitt Peak	Spacewatch	·	1.0 km	MPC · JPL
271400	2004 CE_{12}	—	February 11, 2004	Palomar	NEAT	·	960 m	MPC · JPL

== 271401–271500 ==
back to top

Designation			Discovery			Properties		Ref
Permanent	Provisional	Named after	Date	Site	Discoverer(s)	Category	Diam.	Ref
271401	2004 CZ_{16}	—	February 11, 2004	Kitt Peak	Spacewatch	·	720 m	MPC · JPL
271402	2004 CU_{44}	—	February 13, 2004	Kitt Peak	Spacewatch	·	660 m	MPC · JPL
271403	2004 CK_{61}	—	February 11, 2004	Kitt Peak	Spacewatch	·	790 m	MPC · JPL
271404	2004 CA_{84}	—	February 12, 2004	Kitt Peak	Spacewatch	·	1.1 km	MPC · JPL
271405	2004 CK_{85}	—	February 14, 2004	Kitt Peak	Spacewatch	·	960 m	MPC · JPL
271406	2004 CN_{85}	—	February 14, 2004	Kitt Peak	Spacewatch	·	860 m	MPC · JPL
271407	2004 CQ_{85}	—	February 14, 2004	Kitt Peak	Spacewatch	·	1.2 km	MPC · JPL
271408	2004 CN_{93}	—	February 11, 2004	Palomar	NEAT	·	1.1 km	MPC · JPL
271409	2004 CS_{95}	—	February 13, 2004	Palomar	NEAT	·	1.1 km	MPC · JPL
271410	2004 CF_{96}	—	February 14, 2004	Kitt Peak	Spacewatch	·	1.3 km	MPC · JPL
271411	2004 CF_{97}	—	February 13, 2004	Kitt Peak	Spacewatch	·	920 m	MPC · JPL
271412	2004 CQ_{107}	—	February 14, 2004	Kitt Peak	Spacewatch	·	840 m	MPC · JPL
271413	2004 CO_{108}	—	February 15, 2004	Palomar	NEAT	·	900 m	MPC · JPL
271414	2004 CQ_{108}	—	February 15, 2004	Catalina	CSS	·	1 km	MPC · JPL
271415	2004 CR_{108}	—	February 15, 2004	Catalina	CSS	·	940 m	MPC · JPL
271416	2004 CK_{111}	—	February 14, 2004	Kitt Peak	Spacewatch	·	1.5 km	MPC · JPL
271417	2004 CT_{111}	—	February 14, 2004	Kitt Peak	Spacewatch	·	910 m	MPC · JPL
271418	2004 CU_{112}	—	February 13, 2004	Anderson Mesa	LONEOS	·	780 m	MPC · JPL
271419	2004 CR_{114}	—	February 2, 2004	Anderson Mesa	LONEOS	·	1.9 km	MPC · JPL
271420	2004 CZ_{127}	—	February 13, 2004	Kitt Peak	Spacewatch	·	890 m	MPC · JPL
271421	2004 CP_{128}	—	February 14, 2004	Palomar	NEAT	·	730 m	MPC · JPL
271422	2004 DZ_{1}	—	February 17, 2004	Socorro	LINEAR	·	970 m	MPC · JPL
271423	2004 DF_{7}	—	February 17, 2004	Kitt Peak	Spacewatch	·	1.3 km	MPC · JPL
271424	2004 DQ_{9}	—	February 17, 2004	Socorro	LINEAR	·	2.2 km	MPC · JPL
271425	2004 DF_{12}	—	February 17, 2004	Haleakala	NEAT	·	1.3 km	MPC · JPL
271426	2004 DU_{12}	—	February 16, 2004	Catalina	CSS	·	1.6 km	MPC · JPL
271427	2004 DN_{15}	—	February 17, 2004	Socorro	LINEAR	·	940 m	MPC · JPL
271428	2004 DL_{19}	—	February 17, 2004	Socorro	LINEAR	·	830 m	MPC · JPL
271429	2004 DT_{23}	—	February 19, 2004	Socorro	LINEAR	·	1.1 km	MPC · JPL
271430	2004 DT_{31}	—	February 17, 2004	Socorro	LINEAR	·	870 m	MPC · JPL
271431	2004 DL_{38}	—	February 20, 2004	Haleakala	NEAT	·	1.4 km	MPC · JPL
271432	2004 DV_{38}	—	February 22, 2004	Kitt Peak	Spacewatch	·	1.3 km	MPC · JPL
271433	2004 DG_{39}	—	February 22, 2004	Kitt Peak	Spacewatch	·	910 m	MPC · JPL
271434	2004 DX_{40}	—	February 18, 2004	Socorro	LINEAR	·	1.4 km	MPC · JPL
271435	2004 DT_{44}	—	February 17, 2004	Haleakala	NEAT	·	1.0 km	MPC · JPL
271436	2004 DR_{50}	—	February 23, 2004	Socorro	LINEAR	·	690 m	MPC · JPL
271437	2004 DH_{51}	—	February 23, 2004	Socorro	LINEAR	·	1.0 km	MPC · JPL
271438	2004 DA_{56}	—	February 22, 2004	Kitt Peak	Spacewatch	NYS	910 m	MPC · JPL
271439	2004 DU_{60}	—	February 26, 2004	Socorro	LINEAR	·	620 m	MPC · JPL
271440	2004 DS_{61}	—	February 26, 2004	Socorro	LINEAR	3:2 · SHU	5.2 km	MPC · JPL
271441	2004 DH_{66}	—	February 25, 2004	Socorro	LINEAR	·	780 m	MPC · JPL
271442	2004 DW_{74}	—	February 17, 2004	Kitt Peak	Spacewatch	V	740 m	MPC · JPL
271443	2004 EA_{6}	—	March 11, 2004	Palomar	NEAT	(2076)	1.1 km	MPC · JPL
271444	2004 EC_{10}	—	March 12, 2004	Palomar	NEAT	V	880 m	MPC · JPL
271445	2004 EC_{12}	—	March 11, 2004	Palomar	NEAT	·	1.3 km	MPC · JPL
271446	2004 EU_{14}	—	March 11, 2004	Palomar	NEAT	·	1.0 km	MPC · JPL
271447	2004 EX_{16}	—	March 12, 2004	Palomar	NEAT	(2076)	1.1 km	MPC · JPL
271448	2004 ET_{22}	—	March 15, 2004	Socorro	LINEAR	V	770 m	MPC · JPL
271449	2004 EY_{26}	—	March 14, 2004	Kitt Peak	Spacewatch	·	1.0 km	MPC · JPL
271450	2004 EF_{36}	—	March 13, 2004	Palomar	NEAT	·	980 m	MPC · JPL
271451	2004 EF_{39}	—	March 15, 2004	Kitt Peak	Spacewatch	·	940 m	MPC · JPL
271452	2004 EU_{40}	—	March 15, 2004	Kitt Peak	Spacewatch	·	1.1 km	MPC · JPL
271453	2004 EL_{41}	—	March 15, 2004	Kitt Peak	Spacewatch	·	1.2 km	MPC · JPL
271454	2004 ET_{41}	—	March 15, 2004	Socorro	LINEAR	·	1.3 km	MPC · JPL
271455	2004 EY_{47}	—	March 15, 2004	Catalina	CSS	·	2.0 km	MPC · JPL
271456	2004 EP_{52}	—	March 15, 2004	Catalina	CSS	·	1.1 km	MPC · JPL
271457	2004 EN_{62}	—	March 12, 2004	Palomar	NEAT	·	820 m	MPC · JPL
271458	2004 EY_{63}	—	March 13, 2004	Palomar	NEAT	·	1.4 km	MPC · JPL
271459	2004 EA_{67}	—	March 15, 2004	Kitt Peak	Spacewatch	·	2.5 km	MPC · JPL
271460	2004 EZ_{69}	—	March 15, 2004	Kitt Peak	Spacewatch	·	850 m	MPC · JPL
271461	2004 EG_{73}	—	March 15, 2004	Catalina	CSS	·	1.5 km	MPC · JPL
271462	2004 EM_{76}	—	March 15, 2004	Kitt Peak	Spacewatch	·	1.1 km	MPC · JPL
271463	2004 ES_{80}	—	March 15, 2004	Socorro	LINEAR	·	1.1 km	MPC · JPL
271464	2004 EB_{81}	—	March 15, 2004	Socorro	LINEAR	·	1.2 km	MPC · JPL
271465	2004 EU_{81}	—	March 15, 2004	Socorro	LINEAR	·	1.0 km	MPC · JPL
271466	2004 EB_{82}	—	March 15, 2004	Socorro	LINEAR	·	1.3 km	MPC · JPL
271467	2004 EG_{84}	—	March 15, 2004	Kitt Peak	Spacewatch	·	930 m	MPC · JPL
271468	2004 EF_{86}	—	March 15, 2004	Socorro	LINEAR	·	1.8 km	MPC · JPL
271469	2004 EZ_{86}	—	March 15, 2004	Kitt Peak	Spacewatch	(2076)	2.0 km	MPC · JPL
271470	2004 EA_{90}	—	March 14, 2004	Kitt Peak	Spacewatch	·	3.1 km	MPC · JPL
271471	2004 EM_{93}	—	March 15, 2004	Kitt Peak	Spacewatch	·	890 m	MPC · JPL
271472	2004 EE_{116}	—	March 15, 2004	Kitt Peak	Spacewatch	·	790 m	MPC · JPL
271473	2004 FW_{3}	—	March 19, 2004	Socorro	LINEAR	PHO	970 m	MPC · JPL
271474	2004 FG_{6}	—	March 24, 2004	Wrightwood	J. W. Young	·	1.2 km	MPC · JPL
271475	2004 FW_{12}	—	March 16, 2004	Catalina	CSS	·	1.4 km	MPC · JPL
271476	2004 FD_{13}	—	November 14, 2002	Palomar	NEAT	·	1.7 km	MPC · JPL
271477	2004 FN_{20}	—	March 16, 2004	Catalina	CSS	·	1.2 km	MPC · JPL
271478	2004 FD_{24}	—	March 17, 2004	Kitt Peak	Spacewatch	·	940 m	MPC · JPL
271479	2004 FV_{27}	—	March 17, 2004	Kitt Peak	Spacewatch	·	850 m	MPC · JPL
271480	2004 FX_{31}	—	March 31, 2004	Anderson Mesa	LONEOS	APO +1km	710 m	MPC · JPL
271481	2004 FD_{35}	—	March 16, 2004	Kitt Peak	Spacewatch	·	990 m	MPC · JPL
271482	2004 FE_{36}	—	March 16, 2004	Socorro	LINEAR	·	1.1 km	MPC · JPL
271483	2004 FZ_{40}	—	March 18, 2004	Socorro	LINEAR	·	860 m	MPC · JPL
271484	2004 FD_{41}	—	March 18, 2004	Socorro	LINEAR	·	1.1 km	MPC · JPL
271485	2004 FA_{49}	—	March 18, 2004	Socorro	LINEAR	NYS	1.2 km	MPC · JPL
271486	2004 FV_{49}	—	March 18, 2004	Socorro	LINEAR	·	720 m	MPC · JPL
271487	2004 FL_{50}	—	March 18, 2004	Socorro	LINEAR	·	800 m	MPC · JPL
271488	2004 FA_{51}	—	March 18, 2004	Kitt Peak	Spacewatch	·	870 m	MPC · JPL
271489	2004 FW_{55}	—	March 20, 2004	Socorro	LINEAR	·	950 m	MPC · JPL
271490	2004 FP_{62}	—	March 19, 2004	Socorro	LINEAR	·	1.5 km	MPC · JPL
271491	2004 FB_{72}	—	March 17, 2004	Kitt Peak	Spacewatch	·	830 m	MPC · JPL
271492	2004 FV_{80}	—	March 16, 2004	Socorro	LINEAR	·	3.8 km	MPC · JPL
271493	2004 FE_{88}	—	January 13, 2000	Kitt Peak	Spacewatch	·	980 m	MPC · JPL
271494	2004 FS_{92}	—	March 18, 2004	Socorro	LINEAR	·	1.3 km	MPC · JPL
271495	2004 FC_{94}	—	March 22, 2004	Socorro	LINEAR	PHO	1.4 km	MPC · JPL
271496	2004 FP_{98}	—	March 19, 2004	Socorro	LINEAR	THM	3.0 km	MPC · JPL
271497	2004 FY_{98}	—	March 19, 2004	Kitt Peak	Spacewatch	·	1.1 km	MPC · JPL
271498	2004 FL_{101}	—	March 23, 2004	Socorro	LINEAR	·	1.0 km	MPC · JPL
271499	2004 FA_{111}	—	March 25, 2004	Anderson Mesa	LONEOS	·	1.9 km	MPC · JPL
271500	2004 FN_{111}	—	March 26, 2004	Socorro	LINEAR	·	1.2 km	MPC · JPL

== 271501–271600 ==
back to top

Designation			Discovery			Properties		Ref
Permanent	Provisional	Named after	Date	Site	Discoverer(s)	Category	Diam.	Ref
271501	2004 FR_{111}	—	March 26, 2004	Socorro	LINEAR	·	980 m	MPC · JPL
271502	2004 FJ_{117}	—	March 27, 2004	Socorro	LINEAR	·	790 m	MPC · JPL
271503	2004 FE_{120}	—	March 23, 2004	Kitt Peak	Spacewatch	·	1.0 km	MPC · JPL
271504	2004 FF_{122}	—	March 25, 2004	Anderson Mesa	LONEOS	·	1.1 km	MPC · JPL
271505	2004 FS_{125}	—	March 27, 2004	Socorro	LINEAR	·	1.3 km	MPC · JPL
271506	2004 FZ_{125}	—	March 27, 2004	Socorro	LINEAR	·	1.5 km	MPC · JPL
271507	2004 FW_{126}	—	March 27, 2004	Socorro	LINEAR	·	1.3 km	MPC · JPL
271508	2004 FL_{134}	—	March 26, 2004	Socorro	LINEAR	·	1.4 km	MPC · JPL
271509	2004 FP_{134}	—	March 26, 2004	Socorro	LINEAR	·	1.5 km	MPC · JPL
271510	2004 FO_{141}	—	March 27, 2004	Socorro	LINEAR	·	1.1 km	MPC · JPL
271511	2004 FA_{146}	—	March 30, 2004	Kitt Peak	Spacewatch	·	690 m	MPC · JPL
271512	2004 GO_{5}	—	April 11, 2004	Catalina	CSS	·	1.3 km	MPC · JPL
271513	2004 GX_{13}	—	April 13, 2004	Palomar	NEAT	·	1.2 km	MPC · JPL
271514	2004 GV_{15}	—	April 9, 2004	Siding Spring	SSS	·	760 m	MPC · JPL
271515	2004 GQ_{22}	—	April 12, 2004	Anderson Mesa	LONEOS	·	980 m	MPC · JPL
271516	2004 GX_{22}	—	April 12, 2004	Anderson Mesa	LONEOS	·	860 m	MPC · JPL
271517	2004 GF_{24}	—	April 13, 2004	Catalina	CSS	V	890 m	MPC · JPL
271518	2004 GT_{28}	—	April 14, 2004	Anderson Mesa	LONEOS	PHO	1.0 km	MPC · JPL
271519	2004 GL_{39}	—	April 15, 2004	Anderson Mesa	LONEOS	·	1.6 km	MPC · JPL
271520	2004 GE_{46}	—	April 12, 2004	Kitt Peak	Spacewatch	(2076)	1.0 km	MPC · JPL
271521	2004 GF_{49}	—	April 12, 2004	Kitt Peak	Spacewatch	fast	1.4 km	MPC · JPL
271522	2004 GD_{50}	—	April 12, 2004	Kitt Peak	Spacewatch	·	1.4 km	MPC · JPL
271523	2004 GY_{56}	—	April 14, 2004	Kitt Peak	Spacewatch	·	1.5 km	MPC · JPL
271524	2004 GP_{60}	—	April 14, 2004	Kitt Peak	Spacewatch	·	870 m	MPC · JPL
271525	2004 GJ_{63}	—	April 13, 2004	Kitt Peak	Spacewatch	·	1.0 km	MPC · JPL
271526	2004 GB_{79}	—	April 11, 2004	Palomar	NEAT	·	1.0 km	MPC · JPL
271527	2004 GP_{87}	—	April 15, 2004	Palomar	NEAT	V	920 m	MPC · JPL
271528	2004 HS_{5}	—	April 17, 2004	Socorro	LINEAR	·	1.4 km	MPC · JPL
271529	2004 HL_{6}	—	April 17, 2004	Socorro	LINEAR	·	3.1 km	MPC · JPL
271530	2004 HS_{18}	—	April 17, 2004	Siding Spring	SSS	·	1.2 km	MPC · JPL
271531	2004 HH_{25}	—	April 19, 2004	Socorro	LINEAR	·	1.9 km	MPC · JPL
271532	2004 HW_{27}	—	April 20, 2004	Socorro	LINEAR	·	1.1 km	MPC · JPL
271533	2004 HY_{32}	—	April 17, 2004	Anderson Mesa	LONEOS	·	2.2 km	MPC · JPL
271534	2004 HQ_{45}	—	April 21, 2004	Socorro	LINEAR	V	830 m	MPC · JPL
271535	2004 HH_{56}	—	April 25, 2004	Socorro	LINEAR	·	1.8 km	MPC · JPL
271536	2004 HV_{57}	—	April 21, 2004	Kitt Peak	Spacewatch	·	1.5 km	MPC · JPL
271537	2004 HA_{60}	—	April 23, 2004	Catalina	CSS	·	1.2 km	MPC · JPL
271538	2004 JN_{3}	—	May 9, 2004	Palomar	NEAT	·	1.7 km	MPC · JPL
271539	2004 JK_{4}	—	May 10, 2004	Catalina	CSS	·	1.2 km	MPC · JPL
271540	2004 JQ_{4}	—	May 11, 2004	Anderson Mesa	LONEOS	·	1.0 km	MPC · JPL
271541	2004 JG_{10}	—	May 10, 2004	Palomar	NEAT	PHO	1.6 km	MPC · JPL
271542	2004 JC_{14}	—	May 9, 2004	Palomar	NEAT	·	970 m	MPC · JPL
271543	2004 JW_{14}	—	May 9, 2004	Kitt Peak	Spacewatch	·	1.4 km	MPC · JPL
271544	2004 JB_{16}	—	May 11, 2004	Anderson Mesa	LONEOS	V	1.1 km	MPC · JPL
271545	2004 JT_{16}	—	May 11, 2004	Anderson Mesa	LONEOS	·	1.1 km	MPC · JPL
271546	2004 JN_{17}	—	May 12, 2004	Siding Spring	SSS	·	1.6 km	MPC · JPL
271547	2004 JU_{17}	—	May 12, 2004	Siding Spring	SSS	·	1.3 km	MPC · JPL
271548	2004 JV_{17}	—	May 12, 2004	Siding Spring	SSS	·	1.3 km	MPC · JPL
271549	2004 JD_{19}	—	May 13, 2004	Palomar	NEAT	·	1.1 km	MPC · JPL
271550	2004 JU_{21}	—	May 9, 2004	Kitt Peak	Spacewatch	·	1.3 km	MPC · JPL
271551	2004 JB_{25}	—	May 15, 2004	Socorro	LINEAR	NYS	1.0 km	MPC · JPL
271552	2004 JW_{25}	—	May 15, 2004	Socorro	LINEAR	·	1.7 km	MPC · JPL
271553	2004 JC_{27}	—	May 15, 2004	Socorro	LINEAR	·	1.3 km	MPC · JPL
271554	2004 JC_{30}	—	May 15, 2004	Socorro	LINEAR	NYS	1.3 km	MPC · JPL
271555	2004 JK_{30}	—	May 15, 2004	Socorro	LINEAR	·	1.4 km	MPC · JPL
271556	2004 JV_{30}	—	May 15, 2004	Socorro	LINEAR	PHO	1.2 km	MPC · JPL
271557	2004 JR_{31}	—	May 15, 2004	Campo Imperatore	CINEOS	·	1.6 km	MPC · JPL
271558	2004 JQ_{32}	—	May 15, 2004	Socorro	LINEAR	·	2.0 km	MPC · JPL
271559	2004 JV_{32}	—	May 15, 2004	Socorro	LINEAR	fast	1.5 km	MPC · JPL
271560	2004 JJ_{34}	—	May 15, 2004	Socorro	LINEAR	(5)	1.7 km	MPC · JPL
271561	2004 JE_{35}	—	May 15, 2004	Socorro	LINEAR	·	1.6 km	MPC · JPL
271562	2004 JW_{37}	—	May 14, 2004	Socorro	LINEAR	PHO	1.0 km	MPC · JPL
271563	2004 JQ_{44}	—	May 15, 2004	Socorro	LINEAR	·	1.2 km	MPC · JPL
271564	2004 JP_{45}	—	May 12, 2004	Anderson Mesa	LONEOS	·	1.6 km	MPC · JPL
271565	2004 JJ_{53}	—	May 9, 2004	Kitt Peak	Spacewatch	·	1.2 km	MPC · JPL
271566	2004 KQ	—	May 16, 2004	Siding Spring	SSS	·	1.4 km	MPC · JPL
271567	2004 KL_{3}	—	May 16, 2004	Socorro	LINEAR	V	960 m	MPC · JPL
271568	2004 KU_{6}	—	May 19, 2004	Needville	J. Dellinger, P. G. A. Garossino	·	1.5 km	MPC · JPL
271569	2004 KP_{8}	—	May 18, 2004	Socorro	LINEAR	·	1.4 km	MPC · JPL
271570	2004 KY_{10}	—	May 19, 2004	Kitt Peak	Spacewatch	V	870 m	MPC · JPL
271571	2004 KC_{16}	—	May 24, 2004	Socorro	LINEAR	·	2.2 km	MPC · JPL
271572	2004 LE_{1}	—	June 9, 2004	Siding Spring	SSS	V	770 m	MPC · JPL
271573	2004 LC_{8}	—	June 11, 2004	Kitt Peak	Spacewatch	·	1.8 km	MPC · JPL
271574	2004 LJ_{8}	—	June 11, 2004	Kitt Peak	Spacewatch	·	1.9 km	MPC · JPL
271575	2004 LQ_{12}	—	June 9, 2004	Kitt Peak	Spacewatch	·	1.3 km	MPC · JPL
271576	2004 LZ_{14}	—	June 11, 2004	Socorro	LINEAR	·	1.9 km	MPC · JPL
271577	2004 LT_{15}	—	June 12, 2004	Socorro	LINEAR	·	1.5 km	MPC · JPL
271578	2004 LF_{25}	—	June 15, 2004	Socorro	LINEAR	·	1.8 km	MPC · JPL
271579	2004 LD_{31}	—	June 15, 2004	Socorro	LINEAR	·	2.1 km	MPC · JPL
271580	2004 ML_{3}	—	June 20, 2004	Junk Bond	D. Healy	·	1.3 km	MPC · JPL
271581	2004 MQ_{3}	—	June 16, 2004	Socorro	LINEAR	ERI	2.0 km	MPC · JPL
271582	2004 MZ_{4}	—	June 22, 2004	Reedy Creek	J. Broughton	·	1.7 km	MPC · JPL
271583	2004 MU_{6}	—	June 25, 2004	Reedy Creek	J. Broughton	·	1.8 km	MPC · JPL
271584	2004 MP_{8}	—	June 29, 2004	Siding Spring	SSS	EUN	2.0 km	MPC · JPL
271585	2004 NR_{2}	—	July 10, 2004	Palomar	NEAT	·	2.0 km	MPC · JPL
271586	2004 NU_{4}	—	July 9, 2004	Palomar	NEAT	·	1.8 km	MPC · JPL
271587	2004 NU_{5}	—	July 11, 2004	Socorro	LINEAR	·	1.8 km	MPC · JPL
271588	2004 NZ_{5}	—	July 11, 2004	Socorro	LINEAR	V	860 m	MPC · JPL
271589	2004 NA_{9}	—	July 14, 2004	Reedy Creek	J. Broughton	·	2.2 km	MPC · JPL
271590	2004 NS_{14}	—	July 11, 2004	Socorro	LINEAR	·	4.8 km	MPC · JPL
271591	2004 NW_{15}	—	July 11, 2004	Socorro	LINEAR	(5)	1.6 km	MPC · JPL
271592	2004 NZ_{18}	—	July 14, 2004	Socorro	LINEAR	T_{j} (2.98) · 3:2	6.2 km	MPC · JPL
271593	2004 NF_{22}	—	July 11, 2004	Socorro	LINEAR	·	1.8 km	MPC · JPL
271594	2004 NK_{31}	—	July 11, 2004	Anderson Mesa	LONEOS	·	1.9 km	MPC · JPL
271595	2004 NT_{32}	—	July 15, 2004	Siding Spring	SSS	·	1.5 km	MPC · JPL
271596	2004 ND_{33}	—	July 15, 2004	Socorro	LINEAR	·	1.8 km	MPC · JPL
271597	2004 OD	—	July 16, 2004	Socorro	LINEAR	·	4.0 km	MPC · JPL
271598	2004 OA_{4}	—	July 17, 2004	Socorro	LINEAR	HIL · 3:2	6.3 km	MPC · JPL
271599	2004 OL_{5}	—	July 16, 2004	Socorro	LINEAR	·	1.6 km	MPC · JPL
271600	2004 OX_{5}	—	July 18, 2004	Reedy Creek	J. Broughton	·	1.6 km	MPC · JPL

== 271601–271700 ==
back to top

Designation			Discovery			Properties		Ref
Permanent	Provisional	Named after	Date	Site	Discoverer(s)	Category	Diam.	Ref
271601	2004 OC_{6}	—	July 18, 2004	Reedy Creek	J. Broughton	·	2.3 km	MPC · JPL
271602	2004 OV_{9}	—	July 19, 2004	Reedy Creek	J. Broughton	·	1.4 km	MPC · JPL
271603	2004 PL_{6}	—	August 6, 2004	Palomar	NEAT	·	1.8 km	MPC · JPL
271604	2004 PR_{6}	—	August 6, 2004	Palomar	NEAT	·	2.5 km	MPC · JPL
271605	2004 PU_{7}	—	August 6, 2004	Palomar	NEAT	·	1.3 km	MPC · JPL
271606	2004 PP_{9}	—	August 6, 2004	Campo Imperatore	CINEOS	NYS	1.3 km	MPC · JPL
271607	2004 PW_{10}	—	August 7, 2004	Palomar	NEAT	·	2.6 km	MPC · JPL
271608	2004 PK_{12}	—	August 7, 2004	Palomar	NEAT	·	2.2 km	MPC · JPL
271609	2004 PM_{18}	—	August 8, 2004	Anderson Mesa	LONEOS	·	1.9 km	MPC · JPL
271610	2004 PZ_{20}	—	August 7, 2004	Palomar	NEAT	·	1.4 km	MPC · JPL
271611	2004 PK_{21}	—	August 7, 2004	Palomar	NEAT	H	730 m	MPC · JPL
271612	2004 PP_{24}	—	August 8, 2004	Socorro	LINEAR	·	1.9 km	MPC · JPL
271613	2004 PQ_{27}	—	August 9, 2004	Reedy Creek	J. Broughton	·	1.5 km	MPC · JPL
271614	2004 PD_{37}	—	August 9, 2004	Socorro	LINEAR	MAR	1.6 km	MPC · JPL
271615	2004 PR_{37}	—	August 9, 2004	Socorro	LINEAR	·	1.2 km	MPC · JPL
271616	2004 PT_{40}	—	August 9, 2004	Socorro	LINEAR	ADE	2.9 km	MPC · JPL
271617	2004 PC_{45}	—	August 7, 2004	Palomar	NEAT	·	1.7 km	MPC · JPL
271618	2004 PT_{46}	—	August 8, 2004	Campo Imperatore	CINEOS	·	1.3 km	MPC · JPL
271619	2004 PX_{50}	—	August 8, 2004	Socorro	LINEAR	·	2.4 km	MPC · JPL
271620	2004 PD_{51}	—	August 8, 2004	Socorro	LINEAR	·	2.7 km	MPC · JPL
271621	2004 PH_{52}	—	August 8, 2004	Socorro	LINEAR	·	1.5 km	MPC · JPL
271622	2004 PP_{52}	—	August 8, 2004	Socorro	LINEAR	·	1.3 km	MPC · JPL
271623	2004 PQ_{55}	—	August 8, 2004	Anderson Mesa	LONEOS	·	1.7 km	MPC · JPL
271624	2004 PR_{55}	—	August 8, 2004	Anderson Mesa	LONEOS	·	4.0 km	MPC · JPL
271625	2004 PH_{57}	—	August 9, 2004	Socorro	LINEAR	·	2.6 km	MPC · JPL
271626	2004 PO_{60}	—	August 9, 2004	Socorro	LINEAR	EUN	1.6 km	MPC · JPL
271627	2004 PC_{64}	—	August 10, 2004	Socorro	LINEAR	·	2.0 km	MPC · JPL
271628	2004 PY_{65}	—	August 10, 2004	Anderson Mesa	LONEOS	·	2.0 km	MPC · JPL
271629	2004 PJ_{67}	—	August 5, 2004	Palomar	NEAT	·	1.4 km	MPC · JPL
271630	2004 PH_{68}	—	August 6, 2004	Palomar	NEAT	fast	2.0 km	MPC · JPL
271631	2004 PM_{69}	—	August 7, 2004	Palomar	NEAT	·	1.5 km	MPC · JPL
271632	2004 PK_{70}	—	August 7, 2004	Campo Imperatore	CINEOS	·	3.1 km	MPC · JPL
271633	2004 PU_{73}	—	August 8, 2004	Socorro	LINEAR	·	1.2 km	MPC · JPL
271634	2004 PG_{76}	—	August 9, 2004	Anderson Mesa	LONEOS	·	1.5 km	MPC · JPL
271635	2004 PS_{77}	—	August 9, 2004	Socorro	LINEAR	·	1.8 km	MPC · JPL
271636	2004 PJ_{79}	—	August 9, 2004	Socorro	LINEAR	·	3.4 km	MPC · JPL
271637	2004 PV_{81}	—	August 10, 2004	Socorro	LINEAR	·	1.4 km	MPC · JPL
271638	2004 PP_{85}	—	August 10, 2004	Socorro	LINEAR	(5)	1.8 km	MPC · JPL
271639	2004 PC_{90}	—	August 10, 2004	Socorro	LINEAR	·	2.4 km	MPC · JPL
271640	2004 PS_{93}	—	August 8, 2004	Socorro	LINEAR	·	2.0 km	MPC · JPL
271641	2004 PF_{98}	—	August 15, 2004	Reedy Creek	J. Broughton	·	2.0 km	MPC · JPL
271642	2004 PZ_{100}	—	August 11, 2004	Socorro	LINEAR	·	3.1 km	MPC · JPL
271643	2004 PJ_{101}	—	August 11, 2004	Socorro	LINEAR	·	2.8 km	MPC · JPL
271644	2004 PQ_{101}	—	August 11, 2004	Socorro	LINEAR	·	3.2 km	MPC · JPL
271645	2004 PW_{101}	—	August 11, 2004	Socorro	LINEAR	·	1.7 km	MPC · JPL
271646	2004 PZ_{103}	—	August 12, 2004	Socorro	LINEAR	(1547)	2.1 km	MPC · JPL
271647	2004 PM_{105}	—	August 13, 2004	Palomar	NEAT	·	3.1 km	MPC · JPL
271648	2004 PC_{109}	—	August 11, 2004	Socorro	LINEAR	NYS	1.4 km	MPC · JPL
271649	2004 QO_{6}	—	August 21, 2004	Catalina	CSS	·	2.1 km	MPC · JPL
271650	2004 QF_{8}	—	August 16, 2004	Siding Spring	SSS	·	2.2 km	MPC · JPL
271651	2004 QU_{12}	—	August 21, 2004	Siding Spring	SSS	·	1.5 km	MPC · JPL
271652	2004 QQ_{14}	—	August 21, 2004	Catalina	CSS	JUN	1.3 km	MPC · JPL
271653	2004 QL_{18}	—	August 20, 2004	Catalina	CSS	·	3.0 km	MPC · JPL
271654	2004 QP_{25}	—	August 26, 2004	Catalina	CSS	H	590 m	MPC · JPL
271655	2004 QR_{25}	—	August 20, 2004	Socorro	LINEAR	BAR	1.8 km	MPC · JPL
271656	2004 RO_{1}	—	September 5, 2004	Palomar	NEAT	(194)	1.9 km	MPC · JPL
271657	2004 RP_{5}	—	September 4, 2004	Palomar	NEAT	·	3.3 km	MPC · JPL
271658	2004 RP_{18}	—	September 7, 2004	Kitt Peak	Spacewatch	(5)	1.7 km	MPC · JPL
271659	2004 RJ_{21}	—	September 7, 2004	Kitt Peak	Spacewatch	KON	2.7 km	MPC · JPL
271660	2004 RG_{23}	—	September 7, 2004	Kitt Peak	Spacewatch	·	1.5 km	MPC · JPL
271661	2004 RH_{39}	—	September 7, 2004	Socorro	LINEAR	·	1.8 km	MPC · JPL
271662	2004 RM_{40}	—	September 7, 2004	Kitt Peak	Spacewatch	·	2.2 km	MPC · JPL
271663	2004 RB_{50}	—	September 8, 2004	Socorro	LINEAR	HNS	1.6 km	MPC · JPL
271664	2004 RD_{52}	—	September 8, 2004	Socorro	LINEAR	·	3.2 km	MPC · JPL
271665	2004 RA_{55}	—	September 8, 2004	Socorro	LINEAR	·	1.7 km	MPC · JPL
271666	2004 RC_{55}	—	September 8, 2004	Socorro	LINEAR	·	3.7 km	MPC · JPL
271667	2004 RO_{57}	—	September 8, 2004	Socorro	LINEAR	RAF	1.0 km	MPC · JPL
271668	2004 RX_{59}	—	September 8, 2004	Socorro	LINEAR	·	2.4 km	MPC · JPL
271669	2004 RZ_{59}	—	September 8, 2004	Socorro	LINEAR	·	1.1 km	MPC · JPL
271670	2004 RP_{62}	—	September 8, 2004	Socorro	LINEAR	·	2.8 km	MPC · JPL
271671	2004 RO_{63}	—	September 8, 2004	Socorro	LINEAR	·	2.1 km	MPC · JPL
271672	2004 RF_{67}	—	September 8, 2004	Socorro	LINEAR	·	2.6 km	MPC · JPL
271673	2004 RZ_{67}	—	September 8, 2004	Socorro	LINEAR	·	1.7 km	MPC · JPL
271674	2004 RG_{73}	—	September 8, 2004	Socorro	LINEAR	·	2.2 km	MPC · JPL
271675	2004 RW_{73}	—	September 8, 2004	Socorro	LINEAR	·	1.7 km	MPC · JPL
271676	2004 RT_{76}	—	September 8, 2004	Socorro	LINEAR	·	2.4 km	MPC · JPL
271677	2004 RF_{77}	—	September 8, 2004	Socorro	LINEAR	·	2.6 km	MPC · JPL
271678	2004 RO_{77}	—	September 8, 2004	Socorro	LINEAR	·	2.4 km	MPC · JPL
271679	2004 RB_{79}	—	September 8, 2004	Palomar	NEAT	·	1.8 km	MPC · JPL
271680	2004 RY_{80}	—	September 8, 2004	Socorro	LINEAR	·	1.2 km	MPC · JPL
271681	2004 RZ_{81}	—	September 8, 2004	Palomar	NEAT	(5)	1.4 km	MPC · JPL
271682	2004 RO_{83}	—	September 9, 2004	Socorro	LINEAR	·	1.7 km	MPC · JPL
271683	2004 RW_{83}	—	September 8, 2004	Palomar	NEAT	H	720 m	MPC · JPL
271684	2004 RW_{85}	—	September 6, 2004	Siding Spring	SSS	·	1.1 km	MPC · JPL
271685	2004 RF_{90}	—	September 8, 2004	Socorro	LINEAR	·	1.6 km	MPC · JPL
271686	2004 RS_{92}	—	September 8, 2004	Socorro	LINEAR	·	1.3 km	MPC · JPL
271687	2004 RY_{96}	—	September 8, 2004	Palomar	NEAT	GEF	1.5 km	MPC · JPL
271688	2004 RB_{100}	—	September 8, 2004	Socorro	LINEAR	·	2.1 km	MPC · JPL
271689	2004 RF_{100}	—	September 8, 2004	Socorro	LINEAR	AEO	1.4 km	MPC · JPL
271690	2004 RS_{101}	—	September 8, 2004	Socorro	LINEAR	·	1.8 km	MPC · JPL
271691	2004 RW_{106}	—	September 9, 2004	Apache Point	Apache Point	·	1.4 km	MPC · JPL
271692	2004 RY_{107}	—	September 9, 2004	Socorro	LINEAR	·	1.5 km	MPC · JPL
271693	2004 RX_{114}	—	September 7, 2004	Socorro	LINEAR	(1547)	2.1 km	MPC · JPL
271694	2004 RW_{134}	—	September 7, 2004	Kitt Peak	Spacewatch	·	1.6 km	MPC · JPL
271695	2004 RH_{140}	—	September 8, 2004	Socorro	LINEAR	·	1.7 km	MPC · JPL
271696	2004 RN_{144}	—	September 8, 2004	Palomar	NEAT	LIX	4.5 km	MPC · JPL
271697	2004 RD_{145}	—	September 9, 2004	Socorro	LINEAR	MAS	880 m	MPC · JPL
271698	2004 RL_{146}	—	September 9, 2004	Socorro	LINEAR	·	4.4 km	MPC · JPL
271699	2004 RJ_{147}	—	September 9, 2004	Socorro	LINEAR	(5)	1.8 km	MPC · JPL
271700	2004 RQ_{148}	—	September 9, 2004	Socorro	LINEAR	·	1.2 km	MPC · JPL

== 271701–271800 ==
back to top

Designation			Discovery			Properties		Ref
Permanent	Provisional	Named after	Date	Site	Discoverer(s)	Category	Diam.	Ref
271701	2004 RU_{148}	—	September 9, 2004	Socorro	LINEAR	ADE	2.6 km	MPC · JPL
271702	2004 RG_{154}	—	September 10, 2004	Socorro	LINEAR	·	1.6 km	MPC · JPL
271703	2004 RT_{154}	—	September 10, 2004	Socorro	LINEAR	·	2.0 km	MPC · JPL
271704	2004 RB_{156}	—	September 10, 2004	Socorro	LINEAR	·	1.3 km	MPC · JPL
271705	2004 RL_{158}	—	September 10, 2004	Socorro	LINEAR	GEF	1.6 km	MPC · JPL
271706	2004 RP_{172}	—	September 9, 2004	Kitt Peak	Spacewatch	·	2.1 km	MPC · JPL
271707	2004 RW_{180}	—	September 10, 2004	Socorro	LINEAR	·	2.5 km	MPC · JPL
271708	2004 RG_{182}	—	September 10, 2004	Socorro	LINEAR	·	3.1 km	MPC · JPL
271709	2004 RT_{184}	—	September 10, 2004	Socorro	LINEAR	·	2.2 km	MPC · JPL
271710	2004 RV_{185}	—	September 10, 2004	Socorro	LINEAR	·	1.3 km	MPC · JPL
271711	2004 RN_{191}	—	September 10, 2004	Socorro	LINEAR	·	3.1 km	MPC · JPL
271712	2004 RR_{193}	—	September 10, 2004	Socorro	LINEAR	ADE	3.4 km	MPC · JPL
271713	2004 RU_{200}	—	September 10, 2004	Socorro	LINEAR	·	2.6 km	MPC · JPL
271714	2004 RE_{203}	—	September 11, 2004	Kitt Peak	Spacewatch	·	1.1 km	MPC · JPL
271715	2004 RK_{204}	—	September 12, 2004	Socorro	LINEAR	·	2.9 km	MPC · JPL
271716	2004 RY_{212}	—	September 11, 2004	Socorro	LINEAR	·	7.4 km	MPC · JPL
271717	2004 RY_{215}	—	September 11, 2004	Socorro	LINEAR	·	4.0 km	MPC · JPL
271718	2004 RA_{217}	—	September 11, 2004	Socorro	LINEAR	·	3.9 km	MPC · JPL
271719	2004 RT_{219}	—	September 11, 2004	Socorro	LINEAR	·	3.6 km	MPC · JPL
271720	2004 RD_{226}	—	September 9, 2004	Socorro	LINEAR	·	2.8 km	MPC · JPL
271721	2004 RV_{228}	—	September 9, 2004	Kitt Peak	Spacewatch	·	2.0 km	MPC · JPL
271722	2004 RH_{233}	—	September 9, 2004	Kitt Peak	Spacewatch	(5)	1.4 km	MPC · JPL
271723	2004 RP_{234}	—	September 10, 2004	Kitt Peak	Spacewatch	·	2.0 km	MPC · JPL
271724	2004 RX_{238}	—	September 10, 2004	Kitt Peak	Spacewatch	·	1.6 km	MPC · JPL
271725	2004 RF_{240}	—	September 10, 2004	Kitt Peak	Spacewatch	EOS	2.3 km	MPC · JPL
271726	2004 RD_{241}	—	September 10, 2004	Kitt Peak	Spacewatch	EUN	1.6 km	MPC · JPL
271727	2004 RO_{246}	—	September 10, 2004	Kitt Peak	Spacewatch	·	2.4 km	MPC · JPL
271728	2004 RC_{251}	—	September 14, 2004	Socorro	LINEAR	·	2.9 km	MPC · JPL
271729	2004 RL_{256}	—	September 8, 2004	Socorro	LINEAR	H	690 m	MPC · JPL
271730	2004 RB_{260}	—	September 10, 2004	Kitt Peak	Spacewatch	·	1.9 km	MPC · JPL
271731	2004 RC_{269}	—	September 11, 2004	Kitt Peak	Spacewatch	·	2.1 km	MPC · JPL
271732	2004 RG_{273}	—	September 11, 2004	Kitt Peak	Spacewatch	·	1.8 km	MPC · JPL
271733	2004 RN_{288}	—	September 15, 2004	7300	W. K. Y. Yeung	EUP	8.0 km	MPC · JPL
271734	2004 RC_{292}	—	September 10, 2004	Socorro	LINEAR	·	1.8 km	MPC · JPL
271735	2004 RD_{292}	—	September 10, 2004	Socorro	LINEAR	·	4.0 km	MPC · JPL
271736	2004 RB_{293}	—	September 11, 2004	Palomar	NEAT	·	3.5 km	MPC · JPL
271737	2004 RD_{293}	—	September 11, 2004	Kitt Peak	Spacewatch	·	1.4 km	MPC · JPL
271738	2004 RV_{298}	—	September 11, 2004	Kitt Peak	Spacewatch	·	2.6 km	MPC · JPL
271739	2004 RB_{302}	—	September 11, 2004	Kitt Peak	Spacewatch	·	2.3 km	MPC · JPL
271740	2004 RQ_{308}	—	September 13, 2004	Socorro	LINEAR	·	2.1 km	MPC · JPL
271741	2004 RF_{310}	—	September 13, 2004	Palomar	NEAT	(5)	1.4 km	MPC · JPL
271742	2004 RG_{317}	—	September 11, 2004	Palomar	NEAT	·	1.5 km	MPC · JPL
271743	2004 RJ_{317}	—	September 11, 2004	Palomar	NEAT	ADE	3.9 km	MPC · JPL
271744	2004 RB_{324}	—	September 13, 2004	Socorro	LINEAR	·	2.3 km	MPC · JPL
271745	2004 RM_{324}	—	September 13, 2004	Socorro	LINEAR	·	2.3 km	MPC · JPL
271746	2004 RT_{325}	—	September 13, 2004	Socorro	LINEAR	·	2.1 km	MPC · JPL
271747	2004 RN_{330}	—	September 15, 2004	Kitt Peak	Spacewatch	·	1.6 km	MPC · JPL
271748	2004 RC_{336}	—	September 15, 2004	Kitt Peak	Spacewatch	DOR	3.1 km	MPC · JPL
271749	2004 RF_{337}	—	September 15, 2004	Kitt Peak	Spacewatch	·	2.2 km	MPC · JPL
271750	2004 RG_{338}	—	September 15, 2004	Kitt Peak	Spacewatch	·	2.2 km	MPC · JPL
271751	2004 RQ_{340}	—	September 7, 2004	Socorro	LINEAR	·	2.4 km	MPC · JPL
271752	2004 RS_{341}	—	September 9, 2004	Socorro	LINEAR	·	3.2 km	MPC · JPL
271753	2004 RD_{344}	—	September 13, 2004	Anderson Mesa	LONEOS	·	1.4 km	MPC · JPL
271754	2004 RB_{345}	—	September 10, 2004	Socorro	LINEAR	·	1.4 km	MPC · JPL
271755	2004 RA_{346}	—	September 10, 2004	Socorro	LINEAR	H	670 m	MPC · JPL
271756	2004 RQ_{346}	—	September 10, 2004	Socorro	LINEAR	·	1.9 km	MPC · JPL
271757	2004 RZ_{355}	—	September 4, 2004	Palomar	NEAT	·	1.9 km	MPC · JPL
271758	2004 SF_{1}	—	September 16, 2004	Kitt Peak	Spacewatch	·	2.2 km	MPC · JPL
271759	2004 SE_{3}	—	September 16, 2004	Socorro	LINEAR	HOF	3.2 km	MPC · JPL
271760	2004 SH_{4}	—	September 17, 2004	Kitt Peak	Spacewatch	GEF	1.4 km	MPC · JPL
271761	2004 SV_{7}	—	September 17, 2004	Kitt Peak	Spacewatch	·	2.0 km	MPC · JPL
271762	2004 SC_{14}	—	September 17, 2004	Socorro	LINEAR	(5)	1.4 km	MPC · JPL
271763 Hebrewu	2004 SO_{26}	Hebrewu	September 17, 2004	Vail-Jarnac	Glinos, T., D. H. Levy	·	1.6 km	MPC · JPL
271764	2004 SZ_{31}	—	September 17, 2004	Socorro	LINEAR	·	2.6 km	MPC · JPL
271765	2004 SX_{32}	—	September 17, 2004	Socorro	LINEAR	·	1.9 km	MPC · JPL
271766	2004 SV_{35}	—	September 17, 2004	Kitt Peak	Spacewatch	·	3.4 km	MPC · JPL
271767	2004 SP_{39}	—	September 17, 2004	Socorro	LINEAR	·	3.2 km	MPC · JPL
271768	2004 SK_{42}	—	September 18, 2004	Socorro	LINEAR	HYG	2.8 km	MPC · JPL
271769	2004 SM_{48}	—	September 18, 2004	Socorro	LINEAR	EUN	1.8 km	MPC · JPL
271770	2004 SA_{51}	—	September 22, 2004	Kitt Peak	Spacewatch	·	1.7 km	MPC · JPL
271771	2004 SR_{55}	—	September 23, 2004	Kitt Peak	Spacewatch	·	2.3 km	MPC · JPL
271772	2004 TA	—	October 2, 2004	Three Buttes	Jones, G. R.	AGN	1.4 km	MPC · JPL
271773	2004 TL_{8}	—	October 4, 2004	Palomar	NEAT	H	720 m	MPC · JPL
271774	2004 TO_{12}	—	October 9, 2004	Kitt Peak	Spacewatch	·	420 m	MPC · JPL
271775	2004 TZ_{12}	—	October 8, 2004	Goodricke-Pigott	R. A. Tucker	·	2.6 km	MPC · JPL
271776	2004 TC_{13}	—	October 6, 2004	Socorro	LINEAR	·	2.8 km	MPC · JPL
271777	2004 TN_{15}	—	October 9, 2004	Socorro	LINEAR	H	790 m	MPC · JPL
271778	2004 TF_{20}	—	October 15, 2004	Socorro	LINEAR	H	630 m	MPC · JPL
271779	2004 TG_{22}	—	October 4, 2004	Kitt Peak	Spacewatch	·	2.3 km	MPC · JPL
271780	2004 TH_{22}	—	October 4, 2004	Kitt Peak	Spacewatch	·	1.5 km	MPC · JPL
271781	2004 TZ_{26}	—	October 4, 2004	Kitt Peak	Spacewatch	(5)	1.3 km	MPC · JPL
271782	2004 TE_{28}	—	October 4, 2004	Kitt Peak	Spacewatch	·	2.1 km	MPC · JPL
271783	2004 TY_{28}	—	October 4, 2004	Kitt Peak	Spacewatch	·	1.4 km	MPC · JPL
271784	2004 TP_{33}	—	October 4, 2004	Kitt Peak	Spacewatch	·	1.8 km	MPC · JPL
271785	2004 TQ_{37}	—	October 4, 2004	Kitt Peak	Spacewatch	·	1.7 km	MPC · JPL
271786	2004 TV_{37}	—	October 4, 2004	Kitt Peak	Spacewatch	·	1.0 km	MPC · JPL
271787	2004 TF_{41}	—	October 4, 2004	Anderson Mesa	LONEOS	JUN	1.4 km	MPC · JPL
271788	2004 TR_{42}	—	October 4, 2004	Kitt Peak	Spacewatch	·	1.5 km	MPC · JPL
271789	2004 TS_{45}	—	October 4, 2004	Kitt Peak	Spacewatch	·	1.8 km	MPC · JPL
271790	2004 TZ_{47}	—	October 4, 2004	Kitt Peak	Spacewatch	KOR	1.5 km	MPC · JPL
271791	2004 TB_{48}	—	October 4, 2004	Kitt Peak	Spacewatch	·	1.8 km	MPC · JPL
271792	2004 TT_{48}	—	October 4, 2004	Kitt Peak	Spacewatch	·	2.3 km	MPC · JPL
271793	2004 TQ_{50}	—	October 4, 2004	Kitt Peak	Spacewatch	·	2.9 km	MPC · JPL
271794	2004 TX_{54}	—	October 4, 2004	Kitt Peak	Spacewatch	·	2.8 km	MPC · JPL
271795	2004 TP_{56}	—	October 5, 2004	Kitt Peak	Spacewatch	·	2.2 km	MPC · JPL
271796	2004 TN_{57}	—	October 5, 2004	Kitt Peak	Spacewatch	·	2.4 km	MPC · JPL
271797	2004 TJ_{61}	—	October 5, 2004	Anderson Mesa	LONEOS	EUN	1.4 km	MPC · JPL
271798	2004 TX_{62}	—	October 5, 2004	Kitt Peak	Spacewatch	·	1.2 km	MPC · JPL
271799	2004 TE_{68}	—	October 5, 2004	Anderson Mesa	LONEOS	·	2.9 km	MPC · JPL
271800	2004 TQ_{69}	—	October 5, 2004	Anderson Mesa	LONEOS	·	2.2 km	MPC · JPL

== 271801–271900 ==
back to top

Designation			Discovery			Properties		Ref
Permanent	Provisional	Named after	Date	Site	Discoverer(s)	Category	Diam.	Ref
271801	2004 TD_{78}	—	October 4, 2004	Apache Point	Apache Point	·	2.0 km	MPC · JPL
271802	2004 TC_{82}	—	October 5, 2004	Kitt Peak	Spacewatch	·	1.6 km	MPC · JPL
271803	2004 TB_{86}	—	October 5, 2004	Kitt Peak	Spacewatch	AGN	1.6 km	MPC · JPL
271804	2004 TE_{88}	—	October 5, 2004	Kitt Peak	Spacewatch	·	1.7 km	MPC · JPL
271805	2004 TU_{90}	—	October 5, 2004	Kitt Peak	Spacewatch	·	2.9 km	MPC · JPL
271806	2004 TZ_{93}	—	October 5, 2004	Kitt Peak	Spacewatch	·	2.1 km	MPC · JPL
271807	2004 TB_{95}	—	October 5, 2004	Kitt Peak	Spacewatch	·	5.9 km	MPC · JPL
271808	2004 TJ_{97}	—	October 5, 2004	Kitt Peak	Spacewatch	·	2.0 km	MPC · JPL
271809	2004 TL_{101}	—	October 6, 2004	Kitt Peak	Spacewatch	·	2.3 km	MPC · JPL
271810	2004 TX_{102}	—	October 6, 2004	Palomar	NEAT	·	2.4 km	MPC · JPL
271811	2004 TV_{106}	—	October 7, 2004	Socorro	LINEAR	·	2.9 km	MPC · JPL
271812	2004 TR_{117}	—	October 5, 2004	Anderson Mesa	LONEOS	·	2.8 km	MPC · JPL
271813	2004 TH_{118}	—	October 5, 2004	Anderson Mesa	LONEOS	·	2.3 km	MPC · JPL
271814	2004 TW_{119}	—	October 6, 2004	Palomar	NEAT	·	3.5 km	MPC · JPL
271815	2004 TO_{123}	—	October 7, 2004	Anderson Mesa	LONEOS	·	1.6 km	MPC · JPL
271816	2004 TU_{123}	—	October 7, 2004	Anderson Mesa	LONEOS	MRX	1.4 km	MPC · JPL
271817	2004 TR_{124}	—	October 7, 2004	Socorro	LINEAR	·	2.8 km	MPC · JPL
271818	2004 TB_{128}	—	October 7, 2004	Socorro	LINEAR	·	1.9 km	MPC · JPL
271819	2004 TZ_{129}	—	October 7, 2004	Socorro	LINEAR	·	2.8 km	MPC · JPL
271820	2004 TN_{137}	—	October 8, 2004	Anderson Mesa	LONEOS	MAR	1.5 km	MPC · JPL
271821	2004 TF_{138}	—	October 9, 2004	Anderson Mesa	LONEOS	HNS	2.9 km	MPC · JPL
271822	2004 TE_{145}	—	October 4, 2004	Kitt Peak	Spacewatch	·	2.5 km	MPC · JPL
271823	2004 TD_{146}	—	October 5, 2004	Kitt Peak	Spacewatch	EUN	1.4 km	MPC · JPL
271824	2004 TL_{146}	—	October 5, 2004	Kitt Peak	Spacewatch	·	2.8 km	MPC · JPL
271825	2004 TN_{154}	—	October 6, 2004	Kitt Peak	Spacewatch	AGN	1.2 km	MPC · JPL
271826	2004 TN_{156}	—	October 6, 2004	Kitt Peak	Spacewatch	·	2.2 km	MPC · JPL
271827	2004 TG_{160}	—	October 6, 2004	Kitt Peak	Spacewatch	·	3.2 km	MPC · JPL
271828	2004 TO_{167}	—	October 7, 2004	Kitt Peak	Spacewatch	·	1.4 km	MPC · JPL
271829	2004 TS_{167}	—	October 7, 2004	Kitt Peak	Spacewatch	(13314)	2.2 km	MPC · JPL
271830	2004 TO_{169}	—	October 7, 2004	Socorro	LINEAR	·	3.1 km	MPC · JPL
271831	2004 TW_{170}	—	October 7, 2004	Socorro	LINEAR	·	2.7 km	MPC · JPL
271832	2004 TT_{171}	—	October 8, 2004	Socorro	LINEAR	MRX	1.4 km	MPC · JPL
271833	2004 TG_{173}	—	October 8, 2004	Socorro	LINEAR	H	680 m	MPC · JPL
271834	2004 TE_{185}	—	October 7, 2004	Kitt Peak	Spacewatch	·	2.0 km	MPC · JPL
271835	2004 TH_{187}	—	October 7, 2004	Kitt Peak	Spacewatch	·	1.6 km	MPC · JPL
271836	2004 TM_{187}	—	October 7, 2004	Kitt Peak	Spacewatch	WIT	1.3 km	MPC · JPL
271837	2004 TH_{197}	—	October 7, 2004	Kitt Peak	Spacewatch	·	2.4 km	MPC · JPL
271838	2004 TC_{198}	—	October 7, 2004	Kitt Peak	Spacewatch	·	3.0 km	MPC · JPL
271839	2004 TG_{199}	—	October 7, 2004	Kitt Peak	Spacewatch	·	2.3 km	MPC · JPL
271840	2004 TE_{206}	—	October 7, 2004	Kitt Peak	Spacewatch	·	2.4 km	MPC · JPL
271841	2004 TW_{206}	—	October 7, 2004	Kitt Peak	Spacewatch	(18466)	3.3 km	MPC · JPL
271842	2004 TP_{215}	—	October 10, 2004	Kitt Peak	Spacewatch	·	1.8 km	MPC · JPL
271843	2004 TG_{217}	—	October 5, 2004	Kitt Peak	Spacewatch	KON	3.5 km	MPC · JPL
271844	2004 TP_{222}	—	October 7, 2004	Palomar	NEAT	BRA	1.7 km	MPC · JPL
271845	2004 TV_{227}	—	October 8, 2004	Kitt Peak	Spacewatch	·	1.6 km	MPC · JPL
271846	2004 TU_{228}	—	October 8, 2004	Kitt Peak	Spacewatch	·	2.6 km	MPC · JPL
271847	2004 TS_{235}	—	October 8, 2004	Kitt Peak	Spacewatch	·	1.3 km	MPC · JPL
271848	2004 TC_{241}	—	October 10, 2004	Socorro	LINEAR	·	2.2 km	MPC · JPL
271849	2004 TX_{242}	—	October 6, 2004	Socorro	LINEAR	·	4.5 km	MPC · JPL
271850	2004 TE_{243}	—	October 6, 2004	Socorro	LINEAR	·	3.3 km	MPC · JPL
271851	2004 TD_{247}	—	October 7, 2004	Socorro	LINEAR	EUN	1.5 km	MPC · JPL
271852	2004 TR_{248}	—	October 7, 2004	Kitt Peak	Spacewatch	·	1.9 km	MPC · JPL
271853	2004 TP_{253}	—	October 9, 2004	Kitt Peak	Spacewatch	GAL	1.7 km	MPC · JPL
271854	2004 TA_{258}	—	October 9, 2004	Kitt Peak	Spacewatch	·	2.5 km	MPC · JPL
271855	2004 TJ_{265}	—	October 9, 2004	Kitt Peak	Spacewatch	AGN	1.6 km	MPC · JPL
271856	2004 TR_{270}	—	October 9, 2004	Kitt Peak	Spacewatch	·	2.2 km	MPC · JPL
271857	2004 TH_{272}	—	October 9, 2004	Kitt Peak	Spacewatch	·	2.6 km	MPC · JPL
271858	2004 TO_{273}	—	October 9, 2004	Kitt Peak	Spacewatch	·	2.6 km	MPC · JPL
271859	2004 TN_{277}	—	October 9, 2004	Kitt Peak	Spacewatch	·	2.4 km	MPC · JPL
271860	2004 TG_{278}	—	October 9, 2004	Kitt Peak	Spacewatch	·	1.0 km	MPC · JPL
271861	2004 TX_{279}	—	October 10, 2004	Kitt Peak	Spacewatch	HOF	3.0 km	MPC · JPL
271862	2004 TE_{286}	—	October 8, 2004	Kitt Peak	Spacewatch	·	2.0 km	MPC · JPL
271863	2004 TS_{291}	—	October 10, 2004	Kitt Peak	Spacewatch	·	1.5 km	MPC · JPL
271864	2004 TV_{299}	—	October 8, 2004	Kitt Peak	Spacewatch	AGN	1.2 km	MPC · JPL
271865	2004 TM_{305}	—	October 10, 2004	Kitt Peak	Spacewatch	·	1.8 km	MPC · JPL
271866	2004 TF_{310}	—	October 10, 2004	Socorro	LINEAR	·	2.7 km	MPC · JPL
271867	2004 TN_{311}	—	October 11, 2004	Kitt Peak	Spacewatch	·	1.6 km	MPC · JPL
271868	2004 TC_{326}	—	October 14, 2004	Socorro	LINEAR	·	2.9 km	MPC · JPL
271869	2004 TN_{330}	—	October 9, 2004	Kitt Peak	Spacewatch	·	3.3 km	MPC · JPL
271870	2004 TP_{332}	—	October 9, 2004	Kitt Peak	Spacewatch	·	2.0 km	MPC · JPL
271871	2004 TR_{332}	—	October 9, 2004	Kitt Peak	Spacewatch	(12739)	2.1 km	MPC · JPL
271872	2004 TU_{335}	—	October 10, 2004	Kitt Peak	Spacewatch	·	2.7 km	MPC · JPL
271873	2004 TU_{336}	—	October 11, 2004	Kitt Peak	Spacewatch	MAR	1.3 km	MPC · JPL
271874	2004 TM_{337}	—	October 12, 2004	Kitt Peak	Spacewatch	·	2.5 km	MPC · JPL
271875	2004 TO_{343}	—	October 14, 2004	Socorro	LINEAR	·	2.8 km	MPC · JPL
271876	2004 TY_{350}	—	October 10, 2004	Kitt Peak	Spacewatch	AGN	1.5 km	MPC · JPL
271877	2004 TE_{354}	—	October 11, 2004	Kitt Peak	M. W. Buie	615	1.8 km	MPC · JPL
271878	2004 TQ_{359}	—	October 9, 2004	Anderson Mesa	LONEOS	·	2.6 km	MPC · JPL
271879	2004 UL_{7}	—	October 21, 2004	Socorro	LINEAR	·	2.7 km	MPC · JPL
271880	2004 UO_{7}	—	October 21, 2004	Socorro	LINEAR	·	2.8 km	MPC · JPL
271881	2004 UO_{9}	—	October 25, 2004	Socorro	LINEAR	H	860 m	MPC · JPL
271882	2004 US_{9}	—	October 19, 2004	Socorro	LINEAR	·	2.5 km	MPC · JPL
271883	2004 VA_{2}	—	November 2, 2004	Anderson Mesa	LONEOS	·	3.8 km	MPC · JPL
271884	2004 VX_{2}	—	November 3, 2004	Kitt Peak	Spacewatch	·	2.3 km	MPC · JPL
271885	2004 VT_{3}	—	November 3, 2004	Kitt Peak	Spacewatch	AGN	1.7 km	MPC · JPL
271886	2004 VF_{6}	—	November 3, 2004	Kitt Peak	Spacewatch	·	2.7 km	MPC · JPL
271887	2004 VN_{12}	—	November 3, 2004	Palomar	NEAT	·	3.4 km	MPC · JPL
271888	2004 VG_{14}	—	November 4, 2004	Anderson Mesa	LONEOS	EUN	2.3 km	MPC · JPL
271889	2004 VX_{15}	—	November 2, 2004	Anderson Mesa	LONEOS	·	3.8 km	MPC · JPL
271890	2004 VW_{22}	—	November 4, 2004	Catalina	CSS	·	2.9 km	MPC · JPL
271891	2004 VK_{24}	—	November 5, 2004	Needville	J. Dellinger, Garossino, P.	·	2.3 km	MPC · JPL
271892	2004 VU_{28}	—	November 3, 2004	Kitt Peak	Spacewatch	·	2.0 km	MPC · JPL
271893	2004 VA_{34}	—	November 3, 2004	Kitt Peak	Spacewatch	KOR	1.4 km	MPC · JPL
271894	2004 VL_{37}	—	November 4, 2004	Kitt Peak	Spacewatch	·	2.2 km	MPC · JPL
271895	2004 VA_{43}	—	November 4, 2004	Kitt Peak	Spacewatch	·	1.7 km	MPC · JPL
271896	2004 VK_{43}	—	November 4, 2004	Kitt Peak	Spacewatch	HOF	3.1 km	MPC · JPL
271897	2004 VM_{45}	—	November 4, 2004	Kitt Peak	Spacewatch	·	2.2 km	MPC · JPL
271898	2004 VH_{57}	—	November 5, 2004	Palomar	NEAT	·	3.2 km	MPC · JPL
271899	2004 VQ_{66}	—	November 4, 2004	Catalina	CSS	·	2.3 km	MPC · JPL
271900	2004 VS_{71}	—	November 10, 2004	Kitt Peak	M. W. Buie	·	2.1 km	MPC · JPL

== 271901–272000 ==
back to top

Designation			Discovery			Properties		Ref
Permanent	Provisional	Named after	Date	Site	Discoverer(s)	Category	Diam.	Ref
271901	2004 VP_{73}	—	November 7, 2004	Palomar	NEAT	·	1.8 km	MPC · JPL
271902	2004 VK_{79}	—	November 3, 2004	Kitt Peak	Spacewatch	·	2.1 km	MPC · JPL
271903	2004 WB_{5}	—	November 18, 2004	Socorro	LINEAR	·	2.3 km	MPC · JPL
271904	2004 WS_{5}	—	November 19, 2004	Kitt Peak	Spacewatch	AGN	1.3 km	MPC · JPL
271905	2004 XR_{4}	—	December 2, 2004	Socorro	LINEAR	·	2.5 km	MPC · JPL
271906	2004 XB_{6}	—	December 9, 2004	Catalina	CSS	·	2.9 km	MPC · JPL
271907	2004 XB_{7}	—	December 2, 2004	Socorro	LINEAR	·	3.2 km	MPC · JPL
271908	2004 XA_{8}	—	December 2, 2004	Kitt Peak	Spacewatch	ELF	4.5 km	MPC · JPL
271909	2004 XY_{15}	—	December 10, 2004	Kitt Peak	Spacewatch	·	2.1 km	MPC · JPL
271910	2004 XX_{22}	—	December 8, 2004	Socorro	LINEAR	EOS	2.7 km	MPC · JPL
271911	2004 XA_{27}	—	December 10, 2004	Socorro	LINEAR	·	2.5 km	MPC · JPL
271912	2004 XU_{28}	—	December 10, 2004	Kitt Peak	Spacewatch	EOS	2.6 km	MPC · JPL
271913	2004 XU_{30}	—	December 10, 2004	Socorro	LINEAR	H	820 m	MPC · JPL
271914	2004 XB_{35}	—	December 11, 2004	Kitt Peak	Spacewatch	·	5.6 km	MPC · JPL
271915	2004 XV_{37}	—	December 7, 2004	Socorro	LINEAR	JUN	1.5 km	MPC · JPL
271916	2004 XZ_{37}	—	December 7, 2004	Socorro	LINEAR	·	3.2 km	MPC · JPL
271917	2004 XT_{43}	—	December 11, 2004	Kitt Peak	Spacewatch	THM	2.6 km	MPC · JPL
271918	2004 XB_{44}	—	December 11, 2004	Campo Imperatore	CINEOS	·	3.7 km	MPC · JPL
271919	2004 XM_{45}	—	December 9, 2004	Kitt Peak	Spacewatch	·	2.3 km	MPC · JPL
271920	2004 XM_{58}	—	December 10, 2004	Kitt Peak	Spacewatch	EOS	4.5 km	MPC · JPL
271921	2004 XY_{64}	—	December 2, 2004	Socorro	LINEAR	·	2.7 km	MPC · JPL
271922	2004 XA_{70}	—	December 10, 2004	Campo Imperatore	CINEOS	·	2.0 km	MPC · JPL
271923	2004 XK_{75}	—	December 9, 2004	Kitt Peak	Spacewatch	·	2.9 km	MPC · JPL
271924	2004 XA_{88}	—	December 9, 2004	Socorro	LINEAR	·	5.7 km	MPC · JPL
271925	2004 XO_{100}	—	December 14, 2004	Socorro	LINEAR	·	4.3 km	MPC · JPL
271926	2004 XY_{101}	—	December 10, 2004	Socorro	LINEAR	·	3.8 km	MPC · JPL
271927	2004 XX_{108}	—	December 12, 2004	Kitt Peak	Spacewatch	·	2.9 km	MPC · JPL
271928	2004 XH_{110}	—	December 14, 2004	Socorro	LINEAR	EMA	4.8 km	MPC · JPL
271929	2004 XX_{110}	—	December 14, 2004	Catalina	CSS	·	3.2 km	MPC · JPL
271930	2004 XW_{116}	—	December 12, 2004	Kitt Peak	Spacewatch	·	2.1 km	MPC · JPL
271931	2004 XS_{117}	—	December 12, 2004	Kitt Peak	Spacewatch	·	4.7 km	MPC · JPL
271932	2004 XV_{125}	—	December 11, 2004	Catalina	CSS	·	2.1 km	MPC · JPL
271933	2004 XA_{129}	—	December 14, 2004	Catalina	CSS	·	3.1 km	MPC · JPL
271934	2004 XR_{134}	—	December 15, 2004	Socorro	LINEAR	·	4.1 km	MPC · JPL
271935	2004 XX_{145}	—	December 14, 2004	Catalina	CSS	·	2.8 km	MPC · JPL
271936	2004 XY_{147}	—	December 14, 2004	Catalina	CSS	·	2.6 km	MPC · JPL
271937	2004 XR_{167}	—	December 3, 2004	Kitt Peak	Spacewatch	KOR	2.1 km	MPC · JPL
271938	2004 XG_{169}	—	December 9, 2004	Kitt Peak	Spacewatch	·	2.7 km	MPC · JPL
271939	2004 XQ_{176}	—	December 11, 2004	Kitt Peak	Spacewatch	KOR	1.4 km	MPC · JPL
271940	2004 XE_{191}	—	December 2, 2004	Socorro	LINEAR	DOR	3.1 km	MPC · JPL
271941	2004 YY	—	December 16, 2004	Catalina	CSS	·	3.9 km	MPC · JPL
271942	2004 YW_{19}	—	December 18, 2004	Mount Lemmon	Mount Lemmon Survey	·	3.7 km	MPC · JPL
271943	2004 YJ_{29}	—	December 16, 2004	Kitt Peak	Spacewatch	HOF	3.8 km	MPC · JPL
271944	2004 YG_{32}	—	December 19, 2004	Socorro	LINEAR	T_{j} (2.98)	4.7 km	MPC · JPL
271945	2005 AU_{2}	—	January 6, 2005	Catalina	CSS	·	3.4 km	MPC · JPL
271946	2005 AF_{4}	—	January 6, 2005	Catalina	CSS	EUP	6.3 km	MPC · JPL
271947	2005 AO_{5}	—	January 6, 2005	Catalina	CSS	EOS	3.0 km	MPC · JPL
271948	2005 AW_{17}	—	January 6, 2005	Socorro	LINEAR	TIR	4.0 km	MPC · JPL
271949	2005 AZ_{19}	—	January 6, 2005	Socorro	LINEAR	·	4.7 km	MPC · JPL
271950	2005 AF_{23}	—	January 7, 2005	Socorro	LINEAR	·	5.4 km	MPC · JPL
271951	2005 AR_{23}	—	January 7, 2005	Socorro	LINEAR	·	3.9 km	MPC · JPL
271952	2005 AN_{25}	—	January 8, 2005	Campo Imperatore	CINEOS	·	5.1 km	MPC · JPL
271953	2005 AB_{31}	—	January 11, 2005	Socorro	LINEAR	·	4.9 km	MPC · JPL
271954	2005 AK_{35}	—	January 13, 2005	Socorro	LINEAR	·	2.7 km	MPC · JPL
271955	2005 AN_{37}	—	January 13, 2005	Kitt Peak	Spacewatch	·	2.3 km	MPC · JPL
271956	2005 AC_{38}	—	January 13, 2005	Kitt Peak	Spacewatch	·	2.7 km	MPC · JPL
271957	2005 AQ_{38}	—	January 13, 2005	Catalina	CSS	·	2.2 km	MPC · JPL
271958	2005 AT_{47}	—	January 13, 2005	Vail-Jarnac	Jarnac	·	2.9 km	MPC · JPL
271959	2005 AW_{48}	—	January 13, 2005	Kitt Peak	Spacewatch	·	1.9 km	MPC · JPL
271960	2005 AW_{49}	—	January 13, 2005	Socorro	LINEAR	·	3.9 km	MPC · JPL
271961	2005 AS_{57}	—	January 15, 2005	Catalina	CSS	THB	4.2 km	MPC · JPL
271962	2005 AW_{57}	—	January 15, 2005	Catalina	CSS	·	2.1 km	MPC · JPL
271963	2005 AR_{58}	—	January 15, 2005	Socorro	LINEAR	·	4.1 km	MPC · JPL
271964	2005 AW_{60}	—	January 15, 2005	Kitt Peak	Spacewatch	·	3.4 km	MPC · JPL
271965	2005 AV_{69}	—	January 15, 2005	Kitt Peak	Spacewatch	·	3.2 km	MPC · JPL
271966	2005 AJ_{77}	—	January 15, 2005	Kitt Peak	Spacewatch	·	3.1 km	MPC · JPL
271967	2005 AP_{77}	—	January 15, 2005	Kitt Peak	Spacewatch	·	3.3 km	MPC · JPL
271968	2005 AX_{77}	—	January 15, 2005	Kitt Peak	Spacewatch	EOS ·	5.3 km	MPC · JPL
271969	2005 AT_{78}	—	January 15, 2005	Kitt Peak	Spacewatch	·	4.9 km	MPC · JPL
271970	2005 AB_{79}	—	January 15, 2005	Kitt Peak	Spacewatch	EOS	2.4 km	MPC · JPL
271971	2005 AE_{81}	—	January 15, 2005	Kitt Peak	Spacewatch	·	5.3 km	MPC · JPL
271972	2005 AU_{82}	—	January 8, 2005	Campo Imperatore	CINEOS	·	3.7 km	MPC · JPL
271973	2005 BJ_{2}	—	January 16, 2005	Socorro	LINEAR	·	5.1 km	MPC · JPL
271974	2005 BA_{9}	—	January 16, 2005	Socorro	LINEAR	·	2.4 km	MPC · JPL
271975	2005 BC_{14}	—	January 16, 2005	Socorro	LINEAR	EUP	3.4 km	MPC · JPL
271976	2005 BZ_{24}	—	January 17, 2005	Socorro	LINEAR	·	3.0 km	MPC · JPL
271977	2005 BB_{29}	—	January 31, 2005	Palomar	NEAT	·	4.1 km	MPC · JPL
271978	2005 BN_{35}	—	January 16, 2005	Mauna Kea	Veillet, C.	·	2.3 km	MPC · JPL
271979	2005 BX_{36}	—	January 16, 2005	Mauna Kea	Veillet, C.	·	2.2 km	MPC · JPL
271980	2005 BP_{43}	—	January 16, 2005	Mauna Kea	Veillet, C.	EOS	2.4 km	MPC · JPL
271981	2005 CG_{6}	—	February 1, 2005	Kitt Peak	Spacewatch	·	4.0 km	MPC · JPL
271982	2005 CV_{9}	—	February 1, 2005	Kitt Peak	Spacewatch	·	2.5 km	MPC · JPL
271983	2005 CV_{12}	—	February 2, 2005	Palomar	NEAT	TIR	4.7 km	MPC · JPL
271984	2005 CN_{14}	—	February 2, 2005	Kitt Peak	Spacewatch	·	4.8 km	MPC · JPL
271985	2005 CG_{15}	—	February 2, 2005	Kitt Peak	Spacewatch	THM	2.5 km	MPC · JPL
271986	2005 CH_{16}	—	February 2, 2005	Socorro	LINEAR	·	2.9 km	MPC · JPL
271987	2005 CY_{16}	—	February 2, 2005	Socorro	LINEAR	·	4.0 km	MPC · JPL
271988	2005 CD_{17}	—	February 2, 2005	Socorro	LINEAR	EOS	2.5 km	MPC · JPL
271989	2005 CH_{22}	—	February 3, 2005	Socorro	LINEAR	·	5.1 km	MPC · JPL
271990	2005 CX_{25}	—	February 2, 2005	Catalina	CSS	EOS	2.7 km	MPC · JPL
271991	2005 CL_{26}	—	February 1, 2005	Catalina	CSS	·	2.8 km	MPC · JPL
271992	2005 CV_{27}	—	February 2, 2005	Catalina	CSS	·	4.6 km	MPC · JPL
271993	2005 CC_{31}	—	February 1, 2005	Kitt Peak	Spacewatch	·	3.6 km	MPC · JPL
271994	2005 CV_{31}	—	February 1, 2005	Kitt Peak	Spacewatch	·	5.5 km	MPC · JPL
271995	2005 CB_{34}	—	February 2, 2005	Kitt Peak	Spacewatch	·	3.9 km	MPC · JPL
271996	2005 CW_{34}	—	February 2, 2005	Kitt Peak	Spacewatch	EOS	2.7 km	MPC · JPL
271997	2005 CL_{38}	—	February 4, 2005	Socorro	LINEAR	T_{j} (2.97)	6.2 km	MPC · JPL
271998	2005 CT_{38}	—	February 9, 2005	La Silla	Vuissoz, C., Behrend, R.	EOS	2.3 km	MPC · JPL
271999	2005 CC_{43}	—	February 2, 2005	Socorro	LINEAR	·	3.0 km	MPC · JPL
272000	2005 CX_{46}	—	February 2, 2005	Kitt Peak	Spacewatch	·	3.2 km	MPC · JPL

back to top

== See also ==
- Meanings of minor-planet names: 271001–272000
