= Meanings of minor-planet names: 263001–264000 =

As minor planet discoveries are confirmed, they are given a permanent number by the IAU's Minor Planet Center (MPC), and the discoverers can then submit names for them, following the IAU's naming conventions. The list below concerns those minor planets in the specified number-range that have received names, and explains the meanings of those names.

Official naming citations of newly named small Solar System bodies are approved and published in a bulletin by IAU's Working Group for Small Bodies Nomenclature (WGSBN). Before May 2021, citations were published in MPC's Minor Planet Circulars for many decades. Recent citations can also be found on the JPL Small-Body Database (SBDB). Until his death in 2016, German astronomer Lutz D. Schmadel compiled these citations into the Dictionary of Minor Planet Names (DMP) and regularly updated the collection.

Based on Paul Herget's The Names of the Minor Planets, Schmadel also researched the unclear origin of numerous asteroids, most of which had been named prior to World War II. This article incorporates text from this source, which is in the public domain: SBDB New namings may only be added to this list below after official publication as the preannouncement of names is condemned. The WGSBN publishes a comprehensive guideline for the naming rules of non-cometary small Solar System bodies.

== 263001–263100 ==
| Named minor planet | Provisional | This minor planet was named for... | Ref · Catalog |
|---|---|---|---|
There are no named minor planets in this number range

== 263101–263200 ==
back to top

| Named minor planet | Provisional | This minor planet was named for... | Ref · Catalog |
|---|---|---|---|
There are no named minor planets in this number range

== 263201–263300 ==
back to top

| Named minor planet | Provisional | This minor planet was named for... | Ref · Catalog |
|---|---|---|---|
| 263251 Pandabear | 2008 AA_{119} | The giant panda or "panda bear", an endangered species native in south central China | JPL · 263251 |
| 263255 Jultayu | 2008 BN_{14} | Jultayu, a 1940-meter mountain in Asturias, northern Spain | JPL · 263255 |

== 263301–263400 ==
back to top

| Named minor planet | Provisional | This minor planet was named for... | Ref · Catalog |
|---|---|---|---|
| 263349 Ivanslyota | 2008 CN_{117} | Ivan Mykhailovych Slyota (1937–2014), Ukrainian composer and choral conductor. | IAU · 263349 |
| 263391 Grüntzig | 2008 DA | Andreas Roland Grüntzig, German physician, radiologist and cardiologist. | IAU · 263391 |

== 263401–263500 ==
back to top

| Named minor planet | Provisional | This minor planet was named for... | Ref · Catalog |
|---|---|---|---|
There are no named minor planets in this number range

== 263501–263600 ==
back to top

| Named minor planet | Provisional | This minor planet was named for... | Ref · Catalog |
|---|---|---|---|
| 263516 Alexescu | 2008 EW_{144} | Matei Alexescu (1929–1993), a Romanian astronomer, director of the Urseanu Observatory in Bucharest and founder of the Planetarium in Bacău | JPL · 263516 |

== 263601–263700 ==
back to top

| Named minor planet | Provisional | This minor planet was named for... | Ref · Catalog |
|---|---|---|---|
| 263613 Enol | 2008 GM_{1} | Lake Enol, a mountain lake in the Picos de Europa of northern Spain | JPL · 263613 |

== 263701–263800 ==
back to top

| Named minor planet | Provisional | This minor planet was named for... | Ref · Catalog |
|---|---|---|---|
There are no named minor planets in this number range

== 263801–263900 ==
back to top

| Named minor planet | Provisional | This minor planet was named for... | Ref · Catalog |
|---|---|---|---|
| 263844 Johnfarrell | 2009 BV_{7} | John Farrell (born 1935), an American physicist and an observer of comets and variable stars. He is a member of the Las Cumbres Observatory Global Telescope Network board of directors and Science Advisory Group. | JPL · 263844 |

== 263901–264000 ==
back to top

| Named minor planet | Provisional | This minor planet was named for... | Ref · Catalog |
|---|---|---|---|
| 263906 Yuanfengfang | 2009 FS_{44} | Yuan Fengfang (born 1986), founder of the Guangzhou Stargazers Association | JPL · 263906 |
| 263932 Speyer | 2009 HY_{44} | Speyer, one of Germany's oldest cities, founded by the ancient Romans | JPL · 263932 |
| 263940 Malyshkina | 2009 HN_{58} | Marina Evgen'evna Malyshkina (born 1978), wife of Russian discoverer Timur Valer'evič Krjačko | JPL · 263940 |

back to top

| Preceded by 262,001–263,000 | Meanings of minor-planet names List of minor planets: 263,001–264,000 | Succeeded by 264,001–265,000 |
