= List of minor planets: 263001–264000 =

The following is a partial list of minor planets, running from minor-planet number 263001 through 264000, inclusive. The primary data for this and other partial lists is based on JPL's "Small-Body Orbital Elements" and data available from the Minor Planet Center. Critical list information is also provided by the MPC, unless otherwise specified from Lowell Observatory. A detailed description of the table's columns and additional sources are given on the main page including a complete list of every page in this series, and a statistical break-up on the dynamical classification of minor planets.

Also see the summary list of all named bodies in numerical and alphabetical order, and the corresponding naming citations for the number range of this particular list. New namings may only be added to this list after official publication, as the preannouncement of names is condemned by the Working Group for Small Bodies Nomenclature of the International Astronomical Union.

Near-Earth obj.	MBA (inner)	MBA (outer)	Centaur
Mars-crosser	MBA (middle)	Jupiter trojan	Trans-Neptunian obj.
Unclassified

== 263001–263100 ==
Designation			Discovery			Properties		Ref
Permanent	Provisional	Named after	Date	Site	Discoverer(s)	Category	Diam.	Ref
263001	2007 ES_{115}	—	March 13, 2007	Mount Lemmon	Mount Lemmon Survey	·	1.7 km	MPC · JPL
263002	2007 EL_{116}	—	March 13, 2007	Mount Lemmon	Mount Lemmon Survey	EOS	2.9 km	MPC · JPL
263003	2007 ER_{126}	—	March 9, 2007	Mount Lemmon	Mount Lemmon Survey	·	2.6 km	MPC · JPL
263004	2007 EX_{128}	—	March 9, 2007	Mount Lemmon	Mount Lemmon Survey	·	2.2 km	MPC · JPL
263005	2007 EP_{129}	—	March 9, 2007	Mount Lemmon	Mount Lemmon Survey	·	2.0 km	MPC · JPL
263006	2007 EM_{131}	—	March 9, 2007	Mount Lemmon	Mount Lemmon Survey	·	2.0 km	MPC · JPL
263007	2007 EA_{140}	—	March 12, 2007	Kitt Peak	Spacewatch	·	2.0 km	MPC · JPL
263008	2007 EU_{152}	—	March 12, 2007	Mount Lemmon	Mount Lemmon Survey	NEM	2.5 km	MPC · JPL
263009	2007 EX_{152}	—	March 12, 2007	Mount Lemmon	Mount Lemmon Survey	·	2.9 km	MPC · JPL
263010	2007 EH_{153}	—	March 12, 2007	Mount Lemmon	Mount Lemmon Survey	·	3.2 km	MPC · JPL
263011	2007 ET_{163}	—	March 15, 2007	Kitt Peak	Spacewatch	·	4.6 km	MPC · JPL
263012	2007 ES_{166}	—	March 11, 2007	Mount Lemmon	Mount Lemmon Survey	L5	10 km	MPC · JPL
263013	2007 EF_{167}	—	March 12, 2007	Kitt Peak	Spacewatch	HYG	3.3 km	MPC · JPL
263014	2007 ED_{170}	—	March 14, 2007	Socorro	LINEAR	·	3.3 km	MPC · JPL
263015	2007 EM_{171}	—	March 11, 2007	Mount Lemmon	Mount Lemmon Survey	·	3.7 km	MPC · JPL
263016	2007 ET_{182}	—	March 14, 2007	Kitt Peak	Spacewatch	·	4.5 km	MPC · JPL
263017	2007 EA_{192}	—	March 13, 2007	Kitt Peak	Spacewatch	·	2.0 km	MPC · JPL
263018	2007 EP_{196}	—	March 15, 2007	Kitt Peak	Spacewatch	THM	2.3 km	MPC · JPL
263019	2007 EU_{199}	—	March 9, 2007	Kitt Peak	Spacewatch	EOS	2.8 km	MPC · JPL
263020	2007 EL_{200}	—	March 12, 2007	Catalina	CSS	·	3.0 km	MPC · JPL
263021	2007 EW_{202}	—	March 10, 2007	Palomar	NEAT	·	2.7 km	MPC · JPL
263022	2007 EV_{206}	—	March 13, 2007	Kitt Peak	Spacewatch	·	4.0 km	MPC · JPL
263023	2007 EF_{210}	—	March 8, 2007	Palomar	NEAT	·	6.7 km	MPC · JPL
263024	2007 EB_{211}	—	March 8, 2007	Palomar	NEAT	·	3.3 km	MPC · JPL
263025	2007 ES_{213}	—	March 9, 2007	Mount Lemmon	Mount Lemmon Survey	THM	3.0 km	MPC · JPL
263026	2007 ED_{214}	—	March 13, 2007	Mount Lemmon	Mount Lemmon Survey	·	2.0 km	MPC · JPL
263027	2007 EM_{220}	—	March 14, 2007	Mount Lemmon	Mount Lemmon Survey	EOS	3.3 km	MPC · JPL
263028	2007 EH_{221}	—	March 14, 2007	Mount Lemmon	Mount Lemmon Survey	·	3.0 km	MPC · JPL
263029	2007 EZ_{223}	—	March 13, 2007	Kitt Peak	Spacewatch	KOR	2.2 km	MPC · JPL
263030	2007 FB_{21}	—	March 20, 2007	Kitt Peak	Spacewatch	·	2.6 km	MPC · JPL
263031	2007 FV_{22}	—	March 20, 2007	Kitt Peak	Spacewatch	HYG	4.3 km	MPC · JPL
263032	2007 FE_{42}	—	March 26, 2007	Mount Lemmon	Mount Lemmon Survey	·	4.7 km	MPC · JPL
263033	2007 FV_{43}	—	March 25, 2007	Mount Lemmon	Mount Lemmon Survey	·	5.2 km	MPC · JPL
263034	2007 FK_{45}	—	March 26, 2007	Mount Lemmon	Mount Lemmon Survey	·	2.0 km	MPC · JPL
263035	2007 GF_{4}	—	April 12, 2007	Črni Vrh	Mikuž, H.	·	5.0 km	MPC · JPL
263036	2007 GT_{6}	—	April 7, 2007	Mount Lemmon	Mount Lemmon Survey	THM	3.3 km	MPC · JPL
263037	2007 GO_{30}	—	April 14, 2007	Mount Lemmon	Mount Lemmon Survey	KOR	1.5 km	MPC · JPL
263038	2007 GL_{31}	—	April 15, 2007	Kitt Peak	Spacewatch	·	3.1 km	MPC · JPL
263039	2007 GT_{41}	—	April 14, 2007	Kitt Peak	Spacewatch	·	3.6 km	MPC · JPL
263040	2007 GY_{42}	—	April 14, 2007	Kitt Peak	Spacewatch	HYG	2.8 km	MPC · JPL
263041	2007 GC_{47}	—	April 14, 2007	Kitt Peak	Spacewatch	·	4.0 km	MPC · JPL
263042	2007 GV_{73}	—	April 15, 2007	Catalina	CSS	·	3.7 km	MPC · JPL
263043	2007 GL_{74}	—	April 15, 2007	Socorro	LINEAR	LIX	5.0 km	MPC · JPL
263044	2007 HB_{5}	—	April 19, 2007	Great Shefford	Birtwhistle, P.	·	3.2 km	MPC · JPL
263045	2007 HE_{7}	—	April 16, 2007	Catalina	CSS	·	4.1 km	MPC · JPL
263046	2007 HE_{13}	—	April 16, 2007	Catalina	CSS	·	2.4 km	MPC · JPL
263047	2007 HZ_{22}	—	April 18, 2007	Kitt Peak	Spacewatch	·	3.3 km	MPC · JPL
263048	2007 HE_{23}	—	April 18, 2007	Kitt Peak	Spacewatch	·	4.1 km	MPC · JPL
263049	2007 HM_{30}	—	April 19, 2007	Mount Lemmon	Mount Lemmon Survey	AGN	1.5 km	MPC · JPL
263050	2007 HD_{48}	—	April 20, 2007	Kitt Peak	Spacewatch	·	2.5 km	MPC · JPL
263051	2007 HV_{48}	—	April 20, 2007	Kitt Peak	Spacewatch	·	3.9 km	MPC · JPL
263052	2007 HF_{49}	—	April 20, 2007	Kitt Peak	Spacewatch	·	3.4 km	MPC · JPL
263053	2007 HX_{49}	—	April 20, 2007	Kitt Peak	Spacewatch	T_{j} (2.93)	3.8 km	MPC · JPL
263054	2007 HE_{55}	—	April 22, 2007	Kitt Peak	Spacewatch	·	4.5 km	MPC · JPL
263055	2007 HK_{55}	—	April 22, 2007	Kitt Peak	Spacewatch	·	3.2 km	MPC · JPL
263056	2007 HL_{58}	—	April 23, 2007	Catalina	CSS	·	4.8 km	MPC · JPL
263057	2007 HU_{58}	—	April 23, 2007	Catalina	CSS	·	3.8 km	MPC · JPL
263058	2007 HW_{67}	—	April 23, 2007	Kitt Peak	Spacewatch	·	2.4 km	MPC · JPL
263059	2007 HZ_{67}	—	April 23, 2007	Kitt Peak	Spacewatch	·	4.0 km	MPC · JPL
263060	2007 HM_{88}	—	April 19, 2007	Kitt Peak	Spacewatch	·	5.3 km	MPC · JPL
263061	2007 HC_{90}	—	April 18, 2007	Anderson Mesa	LONEOS	·	6.0 km	MPC · JPL
263062	2007 HO_{95}	—	April 16, 2007	Catalina	CSS	·	4.4 km	MPC · JPL
263063	2007 HT_{97}	—	April 22, 2007	Mount Lemmon	Mount Lemmon Survey	HYG	3.6 km	MPC · JPL
263064	2007 JA_{11}	—	May 7, 2007	Kitt Peak	Spacewatch	·	2.3 km	MPC · JPL
263065	2007 JX_{18}	—	May 9, 2007	Kitt Peak	Spacewatch	·	3.8 km	MPC · JPL
263066	2007 JW_{20}	—	May 11, 2007	Catalina	CSS	URS	5.5 km	MPC · JPL
263067	2007 JA_{22}	—	May 10, 2007	Kitt Peak	Spacewatch	EOS	3.2 km	MPC · JPL
263068	2007 JL_{31}	—	May 12, 2007	Mount Lemmon	Mount Lemmon Survey	·	3.4 km	MPC · JPL
263069	2007 JL_{32}	—	May 12, 2007	Mount Lemmon	Mount Lemmon Survey	·	5.2 km	MPC · JPL
263070	2007 KY_{7}	—	May 17, 2007	Catalina	CSS	·	2.1 km	MPC · JPL
263071	2007 KT_{8}	—	May 17, 2007	Catalina	CSS	·	4.7 km	MPC · JPL
263072	2007 LN_{4}	—	June 8, 2007	Kitt Peak	Spacewatch	·	4.7 km	MPC · JPL
263073	2007 LQ_{24}	—	June 14, 2007	Kitt Peak	Spacewatch	·	3.5 km	MPC · JPL
263074	2007 NA_{2}	—	July 13, 2007	La Sagra	OAM	T_{j} (2.98) · EUP	7.5 km	MPC · JPL
263075	2007 OW_{6}	—	July 22, 2007	La Sagra	OAM	H	740 m	MPC · JPL
263076	2007 RZ_{14}	—	September 11, 2007	Remanzacco	Remanzacco	·	690 m	MPC · JPL
263077	2007 RE_{116}	—	September 11, 2007	Kitt Peak	Spacewatch	(2076)	1.2 km	MPC · JPL
263078	2007 RU_{150}	—	September 8, 2007	Siding Spring	SSS	L4	14 km	MPC · JPL
263079	2007 RU_{191}	—	September 11, 2007	Kitt Peak	Spacewatch	·	830 m	MPC · JPL
263080	2007 RU_{226}	—	September 10, 2007	Kitt Peak	Spacewatch	L4	8.0 km	MPC · JPL
263081	2007 RX_{233}	—	September 12, 2007	Catalina	CSS	·	1.3 km	MPC · JPL
263082	2007 RT_{237}	—	September 14, 2007	Kitt Peak	Spacewatch	·	890 m	MPC · JPL
263083	2007 RQ_{244}	—	September 11, 2007	Kitt Peak	Spacewatch	·	780 m	MPC · JPL
263084	2007 RV_{292}	—	September 12, 2007	Mount Lemmon	Mount Lemmon Survey	·	1.4 km	MPC · JPL
263085	2007 SS_{7}	—	September 18, 2007	Kitt Peak	Spacewatch	·	5.4 km	MPC · JPL
263086	2007 SX_{15}	—	September 30, 2007	Kitt Peak	Spacewatch	H	650 m	MPC · JPL
263087	2007 SB_{20}	—	September 25, 2007	Mount Lemmon	Mount Lemmon Survey	V	780 m	MPC · JPL
263088	2007 TL_{11}	—	October 6, 2007	Socorro	LINEAR	·	1.1 km	MPC · JPL
263089	2007 TE_{39}	—	October 6, 2007	Kitt Peak	Spacewatch	·	1.1 km	MPC · JPL
263090	2007 TE_{47}	—	October 4, 2007	Kitt Peak	Spacewatch	·	1.1 km	MPC · JPL
263091	2007 TH_{64}	—	October 7, 2007	Mount Lemmon	Mount Lemmon Survey	·	1.6 km	MPC · JPL
263092	2007 TB_{69}	—	October 9, 2007	Catalina	CSS	H	920 m	MPC · JPL
263093	2007 TG_{115}	—	October 8, 2007	Anderson Mesa	LONEOS	·	960 m	MPC · JPL
263094	2007 TF_{128}	—	October 6, 2007	Kitt Peak	Spacewatch	·	1.5 km	MPC · JPL
263095	2007 TR_{136}	—	October 8, 2007	Catalina	CSS	PHO	1.4 km	MPC · JPL
263096	2007 TO_{161}	—	October 11, 2007	Socorro	LINEAR	L4	10 km	MPC · JPL
263097	2007 TF_{213}	—	October 7, 2007	Kitt Peak	Spacewatch	V	940 m	MPC · JPL
263098	2007 TL_{215}	—	October 7, 2007	Kitt Peak	Spacewatch	·	900 m	MPC · JPL
263099	2007 TO_{217}	—	October 7, 2007	Kitt Peak	Spacewatch	·	860 m	MPC · JPL
263100	2007 TX_{229}	—	October 8, 2007	Kitt Peak	Spacewatch	PHO	2.5 km	MPC · JPL

== 263101–263200 ==
back to top

Designation			Discovery			Properties		Ref
Permanent	Provisional	Named after	Date	Site	Discoverer(s)	Category	Diam.	Ref
263101	2007 TO_{254}	—	October 8, 2007	Mount Lemmon	Mount Lemmon Survey	·	1.4 km	MPC · JPL
263102	2007 TZ_{268}	—	October 9, 2007	Kitt Peak	Spacewatch	MAS	990 m	MPC · JPL
263103	2007 TD_{299}	—	October 12, 2007	Kitt Peak	Spacewatch	·	1.6 km	MPC · JPL
263104	2007 TT_{299}	—	October 12, 2007	Kitt Peak	Spacewatch	·	750 m	MPC · JPL
263105	2007 TV_{332}	—	October 11, 2007	Kitt Peak	Spacewatch	·	850 m	MPC · JPL
263106	2007 TY_{338}	—	October 15, 2007	Kitt Peak	Spacewatch	·	710 m	MPC · JPL
263107	2007 TO_{366}	—	October 9, 2007	Kitt Peak	Spacewatch	·	1.4 km	MPC · JPL
263108	2007 TS_{377}	—	October 11, 2007	Kitt Peak	Spacewatch	·	1.2 km	MPC · JPL
263109	2007 TP_{380}	—	October 14, 2007	Kitt Peak	Spacewatch	·	850 m	MPC · JPL
263110	2007 TV_{381}	—	October 14, 2007	Kitt Peak	Spacewatch	·	1.9 km	MPC · JPL
263111	2007 TJ_{383}	—	October 14, 2007	Kitt Peak	Spacewatch	·	1.8 km	MPC · JPL
263112	2007 TB_{385}	—	October 14, 2007	Mount Lemmon	Mount Lemmon Survey	·	1.3 km	MPC · JPL
263113	2007 TX_{392}	—	October 15, 2007	Mount Lemmon	Mount Lemmon Survey	·	1.0 km	MPC · JPL
263114	2007 UV	—	October 17, 2007	Catalina	CSS	H	770 m	MPC · JPL
263115	2007 UB_{3}	—	October 16, 2007	7300	W. K. Y. Yeung	(2076)	1.3 km	MPC · JPL
263116	2007 UN_{46}	—	October 20, 2007	Catalina	CSS	·	1.2 km	MPC · JPL
263117	2007 UQ_{47}	—	October 19, 2007	Anderson Mesa	LONEOS	·	980 m	MPC · JPL
263118	2007 UQ_{50}	—	October 24, 2007	Mount Lemmon	Mount Lemmon Survey	·	2.1 km	MPC · JPL
263119	2007 UR_{58}	—	October 30, 2007	Mount Lemmon	Mount Lemmon Survey	·	870 m	MPC · JPL
263120	2007 UN_{90}	—	October 30, 2007	Mount Lemmon	Mount Lemmon Survey	·	1.4 km	MPC · JPL
263121	2007 UU_{107}	—	October 30, 2007	Kitt Peak	Spacewatch	·	2.0 km	MPC · JPL
263122	2007 VC_{6}	—	November 3, 2007	Mount Lemmon	Mount Lemmon Survey	L4	10 km	MPC · JPL
263123	2007 VZ_{43}	—	November 1, 2007	Kitt Peak	Spacewatch	·	640 m	MPC · JPL
263124	2007 VP_{44}	—	November 1, 2007	Kitt Peak	Spacewatch	·	1.5 km	MPC · JPL
263125	2007 VB_{56}	—	November 1, 2007	Kitt Peak	Spacewatch	·	1.2 km	MPC · JPL
263126	2007 VX_{63}	—	November 1, 2007	Kitt Peak	Spacewatch	NYS	1.2 km	MPC · JPL
263127	2007 VG_{83}	—	November 4, 2007	Mount Lemmon	Mount Lemmon Survey	·	1.6 km	MPC · JPL
263128	2007 VB_{84}	—	November 7, 2007	La Sagra	OAM	(5)	2.0 km	MPC · JPL
263129	2007 VJ_{84}	—	November 5, 2007	Catalina	CSS	·	1.6 km	MPC · JPL
263130	2007 VB_{89}	—	November 3, 2007	Socorro	LINEAR	PHO	1.5 km	MPC · JPL
263131	2007 VH_{90}	—	November 4, 2007	Socorro	LINEAR	·	760 m	MPC · JPL
263132	2007 VS_{90}	—	November 5, 2007	Socorro	LINEAR	·	930 m	MPC · JPL
263133	2007 VY_{90}	—	November 6, 2007	Socorro	LINEAR	·	870 m	MPC · JPL
263134	2007 VF_{97}	—	November 1, 2007	Kitt Peak	Spacewatch	·	1.3 km	MPC · JPL
263135	2007 VH_{121}	—	November 5, 2007	Kitt Peak	Spacewatch	·	1.3 km	MPC · JPL
263136	2007 VH_{125}	—	November 5, 2007	Purple Mountain	PMO NEO Survey Program	·	1.0 km	MPC · JPL
263137	2007 VD_{145}	—	November 4, 2007	Kitt Peak	Spacewatch	·	910 m	MPC · JPL
263138	2007 VF_{153}	—	November 3, 2007	Kitt Peak	Spacewatch	·	850 m	MPC · JPL
263139	2007 VJ_{170}	—	November 6, 2007	Kitt Peak	Spacewatch	·	670 m	MPC · JPL
263140	2007 VS_{183}	—	November 8, 2007	Mount Lemmon	Mount Lemmon Survey	·	950 m	MPC · JPL
263141	2007 VO_{191}	—	November 4, 2007	Mount Lemmon	Mount Lemmon Survey	·	910 m	MPC · JPL
263142	2007 VF_{197}	—	November 7, 2007	Mount Lemmon	Mount Lemmon Survey	·	1.7 km	MPC · JPL
263143	2007 VO_{198}	—	November 8, 2007	Mount Lemmon	Mount Lemmon Survey	·	1.3 km	MPC · JPL
263144	2007 VZ_{201}	—	November 5, 2007	Kitt Peak	Spacewatch	V	850 m	MPC · JPL
263145	2007 VA_{204}	—	November 9, 2007	Kitt Peak	Spacewatch	·	1.1 km	MPC · JPL
263146	2007 VE_{207}	—	November 9, 2007	Mount Lemmon	Mount Lemmon Survey	·	1.5 km	MPC · JPL
263147	2007 VZ_{216}	—	November 9, 2007	Kitt Peak	Spacewatch	·	1.1 km	MPC · JPL
263148	2007 VN_{219}	—	November 9, 2007	Kitt Peak	Spacewatch	MAS	840 m	MPC · JPL
263149	2007 VE_{232}	—	November 7, 2007	Kitt Peak	Spacewatch	·	1.0 km	MPC · JPL
263150	2007 VN_{239}	—	November 13, 2007	Kitt Peak	Spacewatch	·	2.2 km	MPC · JPL
263151	2007 VJ_{245}	—	November 14, 2007	Bisei SG Center	BATTeRS	·	1.1 km	MPC · JPL
263152	2007 VZ_{253}	—	November 14, 2007	Anderson Mesa	LONEOS	·	3.4 km	MPC · JPL
263153	2007 VW_{254}	—	November 15, 2007	Mount Lemmon	Mount Lemmon Survey	V	1.1 km	MPC · JPL
263154	2007 VD_{260}	—	November 15, 2007	Anderson Mesa	LONEOS	·	1.4 km	MPC · JPL
263155	2007 VG_{273}	—	November 12, 2007	Catalina	CSS	·	800 m	MPC · JPL
263156	2007 VV_{275}	—	November 13, 2007	Kitt Peak	Spacewatch	·	450 m	MPC · JPL
263157	2007 VL_{280}	—	November 14, 2007	Kitt Peak	Spacewatch	·	1.1 km	MPC · JPL
263158	2007 VF_{286}	—	November 14, 2007	Kitt Peak	Spacewatch	RAF	1.4 km	MPC · JPL
263159	2007 VZ_{300}	—	November 15, 2007	Anderson Mesa	LONEOS	·	3.7 km	MPC · JPL
263160	2007 VD_{303}	—	November 3, 2007	Catalina	CSS	H	700 m	MPC · JPL
263161	2007 VQ_{305}	—	November 3, 2007	Mount Lemmon	Mount Lemmon Survey	·	990 m	MPC · JPL
263162	2007 VS_{306}	—	November 1, 2007	Kitt Peak	Spacewatch	·	1.3 km	MPC · JPL
263163	2007 VQ_{309}	—	November 2, 2007	Mount Lemmon	Mount Lemmon Survey	·	1.4 km	MPC · JPL
263164	2007 VW_{309}	—	November 4, 2007	Mount Lemmon	Mount Lemmon Survey	AGN	1.6 km	MPC · JPL
263165	2007 VN_{311}	—	November 11, 2007	Mount Lemmon	Mount Lemmon Survey	·	1.2 km	MPC · JPL
263166	2007 VP_{311}	—	November 12, 2007	Mount Lemmon	Mount Lemmon Survey	HOF	3.6 km	MPC · JPL
263167	2007 VV_{313}	—	November 11, 2007	Mount Lemmon	Mount Lemmon Survey	·	4.0 km	MPC · JPL
263168	2007 VW_{313}	—	November 13, 2007	Mount Lemmon	Mount Lemmon Survey	·	760 m	MPC · JPL
263169	2007 WW_{20}	—	November 18, 2007	Mount Lemmon	Mount Lemmon Survey	·	3.5 km	MPC · JPL
263170	2007 WX_{20}	—	November 18, 2007	Mount Lemmon	Mount Lemmon Survey	·	3.2 km	MPC · JPL
263171	2007 WY_{20}	—	November 18, 2007	Mount Lemmon	Mount Lemmon Survey	·	980 m	MPC · JPL
263172	2007 WN_{52}	—	November 20, 2007	Mount Lemmon	Mount Lemmon Survey	·	2.3 km	MPC · JPL
263173	2007 WA_{54}	—	November 18, 2007	Mount Lemmon	Mount Lemmon Survey	·	1.2 km	MPC · JPL
263174	2007 XA	—	December 1, 2007	Bisei SG Center	BATTeRS	·	1.4 km	MPC · JPL
263175	2007 XO_{4}	—	December 3, 2007	Catalina	CSS	·	1.6 km	MPC · JPL
263176	2007 XO_{16}	—	December 3, 2007	Kitt Peak	Spacewatch	·	840 m	MPC · JPL
263177	2007 XW_{25}	—	December 15, 2007	Dauban	Chante-Perdrix	·	1.3 km	MPC · JPL
263178	2007 XE_{30}	—	December 15, 2007	Catalina	CSS	·	700 m	MPC · JPL
263179	2007 XP_{33}	—	December 10, 2007	Socorro	LINEAR	·	790 m	MPC · JPL
263180	2007 XG_{38}	—	December 13, 2007	Socorro	LINEAR	·	1.8 km	MPC · JPL
263181	2007 XV_{51}	—	December 5, 2007	Kitt Peak	Spacewatch	AGN	1.4 km	MPC · JPL
263182	2007 XB_{52}	—	December 5, 2007	Kitt Peak	Spacewatch	·	3.3 km	MPC · JPL
263183	2007 XK_{54}	—	December 5, 2007	Kitt Peak	Spacewatch	·	1.1 km	MPC · JPL
263184	2007 YM_{2}	—	December 16, 2007	Great Shefford	Birtwhistle, P.	·	1.7 km	MPC · JPL
263185	2007 YO_{12}	—	December 17, 2007	Mount Lemmon	Mount Lemmon Survey	·	1.5 km	MPC · JPL
263186	2007 YK_{14}	—	December 17, 2007	Mount Lemmon	Mount Lemmon Survey	·	1.4 km	MPC · JPL
263187	2007 YH_{23}	—	December 16, 2007	Mount Lemmon	Mount Lemmon Survey	NYS	1.1 km	MPC · JPL
263188	2007 YP_{32}	—	December 28, 2007	Kitt Peak	Spacewatch	V	950 m	MPC · JPL
263189	2007 YW_{38}	—	December 30, 2007	Mount Lemmon	Mount Lemmon Survey	·	840 m	MPC · JPL
263190	2007 YT_{41}	—	December 30, 2007	Kitt Peak	Spacewatch	·	3.8 km	MPC · JPL
263191	2007 YT_{42}	—	December 30, 2007	Catalina	CSS	NYS	1.3 km	MPC · JPL
263192	2007 YM_{43}	—	December 30, 2007	Kitt Peak	Spacewatch	·	1.1 km	MPC · JPL
263193	2007 YE_{46}	—	December 30, 2007	Kitt Peak	Spacewatch	(5651)	3.7 km	MPC · JPL
263194	2007 YN_{48}	—	December 28, 2007	Kitt Peak	Spacewatch	·	1 km	MPC · JPL
263195	2007 YR_{50}	—	December 28, 2007	Kitt Peak	Spacewatch	·	1.9 km	MPC · JPL
263196	2007 YC_{55}	—	December 31, 2007	Kitt Peak	Spacewatch	·	970 m	MPC · JPL
263197	2007 YD_{57}	—	December 30, 2007	Kitt Peak	Spacewatch	·	2.1 km	MPC · JPL
263198	2007 YX_{60}	—	December 31, 2007	Catalina	CSS	·	2.0 km	MPC · JPL
263199	2007 YB_{64}	—	December 30, 2007	Kitt Peak	Spacewatch	MAS	990 m	MPC · JPL
263200	2008 AO	—	January 1, 2008	Kitt Peak	Spacewatch	·	5.0 km	MPC · JPL

== 263201–263300 ==
back to top

Designation			Discovery			Properties		Ref
Permanent	Provisional	Named after	Date	Site	Discoverer(s)	Category	Diam.	Ref
263201	2008 AU_{1}	—	January 8, 2008	Dauban	Kugel, F.	·	1.7 km	MPC · JPL
263202	2008 AN_{3}	—	January 9, 2008	Vail-Jarnac	Jarnac	·	2.4 km	MPC · JPL
263203	2008 AP_{3}	—	January 5, 2008	Mayhill	Lowe, A.	HNS	2.0 km	MPC · JPL
263204	2008 AJ_{6}	—	January 10, 2008	Mount Lemmon	Mount Lemmon Survey	·	1.0 km	MPC · JPL
263205	2008 AQ_{14}	—	January 10, 2008	Kitt Peak	Spacewatch	·	2.7 km	MPC · JPL
263206	2008 AS_{19}	—	January 10, 2008	Mount Lemmon	Mount Lemmon Survey	·	4.1 km	MPC · JPL
263207	2008 AJ_{24}	—	January 10, 2008	Mount Lemmon	Mount Lemmon Survey	·	750 m	MPC · JPL
263208	2008 AV_{24}	—	January 10, 2008	Mount Lemmon	Mount Lemmon Survey	·	690 m	MPC · JPL
263209	2008 AH_{25}	—	January 10, 2008	Mount Lemmon	Mount Lemmon Survey	NYS	1.6 km	MPC · JPL
263210	2008 AN_{26}	—	January 10, 2008	Catalina	CSS	·	2.0 km	MPC · JPL
263211	2008 AP_{26}	—	January 10, 2008	Catalina	CSS	·	3.0 km	MPC · JPL
263212	2008 AU_{27}	—	January 10, 2008	Mount Lemmon	Mount Lemmon Survey	MAS	810 m	MPC · JPL
263213	2008 AX_{27}	—	January 10, 2008	Mount Lemmon	Mount Lemmon Survey	MAS	950 m	MPC · JPL
263214	2008 AP_{30}	—	January 11, 2008	Desert Eagle	W. K. Y. Yeung	·	1.5 km	MPC · JPL
263215	2008 AE_{32}	—	January 11, 2008	Kitt Peak	Spacewatch	·	1.4 km	MPC · JPL
263216	2008 AC_{34}	—	January 10, 2008	Kitt Peak	Spacewatch	·	3.6 km	MPC · JPL
263217	2008 AF_{36}	—	January 10, 2008	Kitt Peak	Spacewatch	MRX	1.4 km	MPC · JPL
263218	2008 AT_{36}	—	January 10, 2008	Catalina	CSS	·	1.0 km	MPC · JPL
263219	2008 AL_{37}	—	January 10, 2008	Kitt Peak	Spacewatch	·	3.1 km	MPC · JPL
263220	2008 AV_{40}	—	January 10, 2008	Mount Lemmon	Mount Lemmon Survey	·	1.4 km	MPC · JPL
263221	2008 AJ_{44}	—	January 10, 2008	Kitt Peak	Spacewatch	V	1 km	MPC · JPL
263222	2008 AA_{45}	—	January 10, 2008	Catalina	CSS	·	2.4 km	MPC · JPL
263223	2008 AF_{45}	—	January 10, 2008	Lulin	LUSS	·	3.5 km	MPC · JPL
263224	2008 AQ_{45}	—	January 11, 2008	Kitt Peak	Spacewatch	·	2.8 km	MPC · JPL
263225	2008 AX_{51}	—	January 11, 2008	Kitt Peak	Spacewatch	·	2.4 km	MPC · JPL
263226	2008 AZ_{52}	—	January 11, 2008	Kitt Peak	Spacewatch	NYS	1.1 km	MPC · JPL
263227	2008 AK_{58}	—	January 11, 2008	Kitt Peak	Spacewatch	·	1.1 km	MPC · JPL
263228	2008 AN_{60}	—	January 11, 2008	Kitt Peak	Spacewatch	·	2.6 km	MPC · JPL
263229	2008 AP_{62}	—	January 11, 2008	Mount Lemmon	Mount Lemmon Survey	·	3.4 km	MPC · JPL
263230	2008 AY_{65}	—	January 11, 2008	Kitt Peak	Spacewatch	·	920 m	MPC · JPL
263231	2008 AA_{67}	—	January 11, 2008	Kitt Peak	Spacewatch	·	1.9 km	MPC · JPL
263232	2008 AF_{69}	—	January 11, 2008	Kitt Peak	Spacewatch	·	3.9 km	MPC · JPL
263233	2008 AJ_{69}	—	January 11, 2008	Kitt Peak	Spacewatch	·	780 m	MPC · JPL
263234	2008 AP_{69}	—	January 11, 2008	Kitt Peak	Spacewatch	·	970 m	MPC · JPL
263235	2008 AQ_{69}	—	January 11, 2008	Kitt Peak	Spacewatch	·	920 m	MPC · JPL
263236	2008 AG_{77}	—	January 12, 2008	Kitt Peak	Spacewatch	·	2.7 km	MPC · JPL
263237	2008 AT_{77}	—	January 12, 2008	Kitt Peak	Spacewatch	·	1.7 km	MPC · JPL
263238	2008 AZ_{79}	—	January 12, 2008	Kitt Peak	Spacewatch	·	1.0 km	MPC · JPL
263239	2008 AY_{83}	—	January 15, 2008	Mount Lemmon	Mount Lemmon Survey	·	2.1 km	MPC · JPL
263240	2008 AA_{101}	—	January 14, 2008	Kitt Peak	Spacewatch	·	1.4 km	MPC · JPL
263241	2008 AT_{102}	—	January 13, 2008	Kitt Peak	Spacewatch	·	2.5 km	MPC · JPL
263242	2008 AA_{106}	—	January 15, 2008	Mount Lemmon	Mount Lemmon Survey	·	970 m	MPC · JPL
263243	2008 AP_{107}	—	January 15, 2008	Kitt Peak	Spacewatch	·	2.9 km	MPC · JPL
263244	2008 AE_{108}	—	January 15, 2008	Kitt Peak	Spacewatch	·	960 m	MPC · JPL
263245	2008 AW_{111}	—	January 15, 2008	Kitt Peak	Spacewatch	(2076)	1.0 km	MPC · JPL
263246	2008 AV_{113}	—	January 3, 2008	Lulin	LUSS	·	1.0 km	MPC · JPL
263247	2008 AK_{114}	—	January 10, 2008	Mount Lemmon	Mount Lemmon Survey	·	1.4 km	MPC · JPL
263248	2008 AN_{115}	—	January 10, 2008	Mount Lemmon	Mount Lemmon Survey	·	1.9 km	MPC · JPL
263249	2008 AW_{115}	—	January 11, 2008	Mount Lemmon	Mount Lemmon Survey	·	5.3 km	MPC · JPL
263250	2008 AO_{116}	—	January 11, 2008	Kitt Peak	Spacewatch	HOF	3.1 km	MPC · JPL
263251 Pandabear	2008 AA_{119}	Pandabear	January 6, 2008	Mauna Kea	P. A. Wiegert, Papadimos, A.	·	900 m	MPC · JPL
263252	2008 BL_{2}	—	January 19, 2008	Pla D'Arguines	R. Ferrando	·	2.1 km	MPC · JPL
263253	2008 BE_{10}	—	January 16, 2008	Kitt Peak	Spacewatch	·	910 m	MPC · JPL
263254	2008 BK_{13}	—	January 19, 2008	Mount Lemmon	Mount Lemmon Survey	·	1.7 km	MPC · JPL
263255 Jultayu	2008 BN_{14}	Jultayu	January 25, 2008	La Cañada	Lacruz, J.	·	2.0 km	MPC · JPL
263256	2008 BB_{15}	—	January 27, 2008	Eskridge	G. Hug	·	1.1 km	MPC · JPL
263257	2008 BV_{15}	—	January 28, 2008	Lulin	LUSS	MAS	940 m	MPC · JPL
263258	2008 BF_{16}	—	January 28, 2008	Lulin	LUSS	·	3.4 km	MPC · JPL
263259	2008 BH_{17}	—	January 30, 2008	Catalina	CSS	EUN	1.5 km	MPC · JPL
263260	2008 BX_{17}	—	January 30, 2008	Catalina	CSS	·	1.1 km	MPC · JPL
263261	2008 BG_{19}	—	January 30, 2008	Kitt Peak	Spacewatch	·	1.9 km	MPC · JPL
263262	2008 BJ_{19}	—	January 30, 2008	Kitt Peak	Spacewatch	·	2.9 km	MPC · JPL
263263	2008 BW_{20}	—	January 30, 2008	Mount Lemmon	Mount Lemmon Survey	·	1.4 km	MPC · JPL
263264	2008 BM_{22}	—	January 31, 2008	Mount Lemmon	Mount Lemmon Survey	·	4.4 km	MPC · JPL
263265	2008 BP_{22}	—	January 31, 2008	Mount Lemmon	Mount Lemmon Survey	·	2.1 km	MPC · JPL
263266	2008 BM_{23}	—	January 31, 2008	Mount Lemmon	Mount Lemmon Survey	·	1.9 km	MPC · JPL
263267	2008 BH_{24}	—	January 30, 2008	Kitt Peak	Spacewatch	·	2.9 km	MPC · JPL
263268	2008 BW_{24}	—	January 28, 2008	Lulin	LUSS	·	1.4 km	MPC · JPL
263269	2008 BK_{25}	—	January 30, 2008	Mount Lemmon	Mount Lemmon Survey	·	2.6 km	MPC · JPL
263270	2008 BP_{25}	—	January 30, 2008	Mount Lemmon	Mount Lemmon Survey	·	1.3 km	MPC · JPL
263271	2008 BT_{25}	—	January 30, 2008	Catalina	CSS	·	960 m	MPC · JPL
263272	2008 BV_{25}	—	January 30, 2008	Catalina	CSS	EUN	1.5 km	MPC · JPL
263273	2008 BW_{29}	—	January 30, 2008	Catalina	CSS	·	850 m	MPC · JPL
263274	2008 BL_{30}	—	January 30, 2008	Mount Lemmon	Mount Lemmon Survey	NYS	1.3 km	MPC · JPL
263275	2008 BN_{31}	—	January 30, 2008	Mount Lemmon	Mount Lemmon Survey	MAS	950 m	MPC · JPL
263276	2008 BV_{31}	—	January 30, 2008	Mount Lemmon	Mount Lemmon Survey	·	1.9 km	MPC · JPL
263277	2008 BB_{33}	—	January 30, 2008	Kitt Peak	Spacewatch	MAS	860 m	MPC · JPL
263278	2008 BK_{33}	—	January 30, 2008	Kitt Peak	Spacewatch	·	1.9 km	MPC · JPL
263279	2008 BR_{33}	—	January 30, 2008	Kitt Peak	Spacewatch	·	2.8 km	MPC · JPL
263280	2008 BA_{34}	—	January 30, 2008	Kitt Peak	Spacewatch	·	1.5 km	MPC · JPL
263281	2008 BJ_{34}	—	January 30, 2008	Kitt Peak	Spacewatch	·	830 m	MPC · JPL
263282	2008 BU_{35}	—	January 30, 2008	Kitt Peak	Spacewatch	DOR	3.8 km	MPC · JPL
263283	2008 BH_{36}	—	January 30, 2008	Kitt Peak	Spacewatch	·	910 m	MPC · JPL
263284	2008 BP_{37}	—	January 31, 2008	Catalina	CSS	·	870 m	MPC · JPL
263285	2008 BL_{38}	—	January 31, 2008	Mount Lemmon	Mount Lemmon Survey	·	1.6 km	MPC · JPL
263286	2008 BD_{39}	—	January 30, 2008	Catalina	CSS	·	870 m	MPC · JPL
263287	2008 BN_{42}	—	January 31, 2008	Catalina	CSS	(2076)	1.2 km	MPC · JPL
263288	2008 BZ_{46}	—	January 31, 2008	Mount Lemmon	Mount Lemmon Survey	·	2.1 km	MPC · JPL
263289	2008 BP_{47}	—	January 30, 2008	Mount Lemmon	Mount Lemmon Survey	·	2.2 km	MPC · JPL
263290	2008 BT_{50}	—	January 19, 2008	Kitt Peak	Spacewatch	·	2.1 km	MPC · JPL
263291	2008 CW_{3}	—	February 2, 2008	Mount Lemmon	Mount Lemmon Survey	·	2.3 km	MPC · JPL
263292	2008 CJ_{4}	—	February 2, 2008	Mount Lemmon	Mount Lemmon Survey	·	1.1 km	MPC · JPL
263293	2008 CR_{4}	—	February 2, 2008	Mount Lemmon	Mount Lemmon Survey	EOS	2.6 km	MPC · JPL
263294	2008 CQ_{5}	—	February 6, 2008	Socorro	LINEAR	·	1.4 km	MPC · JPL
263295	2008 CK_{10}	—	February 2, 2008	Kitt Peak	Spacewatch	MAS	740 m	MPC · JPL
263296	2008 CM_{11}	—	February 3, 2008	Kitt Peak	Spacewatch	·	2.9 km	MPC · JPL
263297	2008 CU_{11}	—	February 3, 2008	Kitt Peak	Spacewatch	NYS	1.4 km	MPC · JPL
263298	2008 CZ_{11}	—	February 3, 2008	Kitt Peak	Spacewatch	·	2.5 km	MPC · JPL
263299	2008 CV_{17}	—	February 3, 2008	Kitt Peak	Spacewatch	·	1.8 km	MPC · JPL
263300	2008 CX_{17}	—	February 3, 2008	Kitt Peak	Spacewatch	·	2.1 km	MPC · JPL

== 263301–263400 ==
back to top

Designation			Discovery			Properties		Ref
Permanent	Provisional	Named after	Date	Site	Discoverer(s)	Category	Diam.	Ref
263301	2008 CZ_{17}	—	February 3, 2008	Kitt Peak	Spacewatch	·	1.2 km	MPC · JPL
263302	2008 CO_{18}	—	February 3, 2008	Kitt Peak	Spacewatch	EOS	2.1 km	MPC · JPL
263303	2008 CS_{18}	—	February 3, 2008	Kitt Peak	Spacewatch	KOR	2.1 km	MPC · JPL
263304	2008 CG_{20}	—	February 6, 2008	Catalina	CSS	·	4.3 km	MPC · JPL
263305	2008 CG_{23}	—	February 1, 2008	Kitt Peak	Spacewatch	MAS	880 m	MPC · JPL
263306	2008 CH_{25}	—	February 1, 2008	Kitt Peak	Spacewatch	·	1.2 km	MPC · JPL
263307	2008 CN_{25}	—	February 1, 2008	Kitt Peak	Spacewatch	NYS	1.3 km	MPC · JPL
263308	2008 CQ_{25}	—	February 1, 2008	Kitt Peak	Spacewatch	NYS	1.4 km	MPC · JPL
263309	2008 CU_{27}	—	February 2, 2008	Kitt Peak	Spacewatch	·	1.2 km	MPC · JPL
263310	2008 CL_{30}	—	February 2, 2008	Kitt Peak	Spacewatch	NYS	1.3 km	MPC · JPL
263311	2008 CX_{31}	—	February 2, 2008	Kitt Peak	Spacewatch	·	1.4 km	MPC · JPL
263312	2008 CR_{34}	—	February 2, 2008	Kitt Peak	Spacewatch	·	1.8 km	MPC · JPL
263313	2008 CD_{36}	—	February 2, 2008	Kitt Peak	Spacewatch	AGN	1.3 km	MPC · JPL
263314	2008 CG_{38}	—	February 2, 2008	Mount Lemmon	Mount Lemmon Survey	(5)	1.0 km	MPC · JPL
263315	2008 CQ_{39}	—	February 2, 2008	Mount Lemmon	Mount Lemmon Survey	·	1.3 km	MPC · JPL
263316	2008 CZ_{39}	—	February 2, 2008	Mount Lemmon	Mount Lemmon Survey	MAS	760 m	MPC · JPL
263317	2008 CB_{42}	—	February 2, 2008	Kitt Peak	Spacewatch	·	3.0 km	MPC · JPL
263318	2008 CE_{43}	—	February 2, 2008	Kitt Peak	Spacewatch	·	2.0 km	MPC · JPL
263319	2008 CT_{43}	—	February 2, 2008	Kitt Peak	Spacewatch	·	2.1 km	MPC · JPL
263320	2008 CV_{44}	—	February 2, 2008	Kitt Peak	Spacewatch	615	1.9 km	MPC · JPL
263321	2008 CV_{45}	—	February 2, 2008	Catalina	CSS	·	2.5 km	MPC · JPL
263322	2008 CV_{47}	—	February 3, 2008	Kitt Peak	Spacewatch	·	5.4 km	MPC · JPL
263323	2008 CN_{49}	—	February 6, 2008	Kitt Peak	Spacewatch	·	1.4 km	MPC · JPL
263324	2008 CK_{50}	—	February 6, 2008	Catalina	CSS	·	2.2 km	MPC · JPL
263325	2008 CD_{51}	—	February 7, 2008	Kitt Peak	Spacewatch	·	3.4 km	MPC · JPL
263326	2008 CT_{51}	—	February 7, 2008	Kitt Peak	Spacewatch	·	3.2 km	MPC · JPL
263327	2008 CX_{55}	—	February 7, 2008	Kitt Peak	Spacewatch	·	1.5 km	MPC · JPL
263328	2008 CU_{61}	—	February 7, 2008	Kitt Peak	Spacewatch	·	1.4 km	MPC · JPL
263329	2008 CZ_{65}	—	February 8, 2008	Mount Lemmon	Mount Lemmon Survey	·	1.7 km	MPC · JPL
263330	2008 CZ_{67}	—	February 8, 2008	Mount Lemmon	Mount Lemmon Survey	·	2.3 km	MPC · JPL
263331	2008 CY_{71}	—	February 9, 2008	Socorro	LINEAR	·	1.1 km	MPC · JPL
263332	2008 CS_{73}	—	February 6, 2008	Catalina	CSS	LIX	6.2 km	MPC · JPL
263333	2008 CA_{74}	—	February 8, 2008	Kitt Peak	Spacewatch	·	4.4 km	MPC · JPL
263334	2008 CJ_{77}	—	February 6, 2008	Catalina	CSS	·	1.2 km	MPC · JPL
263335	2008 CW_{77}	—	February 6, 2008	Kitt Peak	Spacewatch	·	3.3 km	MPC · JPL
263336	2008 CC_{83}	—	February 7, 2008	Kitt Peak	Spacewatch	·	1.6 km	MPC · JPL
263337	2008 CG_{85}	—	February 7, 2008	Kitt Peak	Spacewatch	·	800 m	MPC · JPL
263338	2008 CG_{86}	—	February 7, 2008	Mount Lemmon	Mount Lemmon Survey	NYS	1.2 km	MPC · JPL
263339	2008 CK_{86}	—	February 7, 2008	Mount Lemmon	Mount Lemmon Survey	·	1.5 km	MPC · JPL
263340	2008 CA_{88}	—	February 7, 2008	Mount Lemmon	Mount Lemmon Survey	(2076)	750 m	MPC · JPL
263341	2008 CH_{89}	—	February 7, 2008	Kitt Peak	Spacewatch	EOS	2.3 km	MPC · JPL
263342	2008 CQ_{91}	—	February 8, 2008	Kitt Peak	Spacewatch	EOS	2.5 km	MPC · JPL
263343	2008 CW_{97}	—	February 9, 2008	Kitt Peak	Spacewatch	PAD	3.1 km	MPC · JPL
263344	2008 CM_{99}	—	February 9, 2008	Kitt Peak	Spacewatch	·	1.2 km	MPC · JPL
263345	2008 CP_{108}	—	February 9, 2008	Catalina	CSS	·	1 km	MPC · JPL
263346	2008 CW_{109}	—	February 9, 2008	Kitt Peak	Spacewatch	·	920 m	MPC · JPL
263347	2008 CS_{110}	—	February 10, 2008	Kitt Peak	Spacewatch	·	3.0 km	MPC · JPL
263348	2008 CR_{115}	—	February 10, 2008	Mount Lemmon	Mount Lemmon Survey	·	2.5 km	MPC · JPL
263349 Ivanslyota	2008 CN_{117}	Ivanslyota	February 11, 2008	Andrushivka	Andrushivka	NYS	1.4 km	MPC · JPL
263350	2008 CN_{121}	—	February 7, 2008	Kitt Peak	Spacewatch	·	3.3 km	MPC · JPL
263351	2008 CU_{131}	—	February 8, 2008	Kitt Peak	Spacewatch	·	1.2 km	MPC · JPL
263352	2008 CV_{131}	—	February 8, 2008	Kitt Peak	Spacewatch	·	1.4 km	MPC · JPL
263353	2008 CE_{133}	—	February 8, 2008	Kitt Peak	Spacewatch	·	1.2 km	MPC · JPL
263354	2008 CZ_{135}	—	February 8, 2008	Kitt Peak	Spacewatch	EOS	3.0 km	MPC · JPL
263355	2008 CG_{140}	—	February 8, 2008	Kitt Peak	Spacewatch	·	1.4 km	MPC · JPL
263356	2008 CQ_{142}	—	February 8, 2008	Kitt Peak	Spacewatch	·	2.1 km	MPC · JPL
263357	2008 CR_{142}	—	February 8, 2008	Kitt Peak	Spacewatch	·	1.8 km	MPC · JPL
263358	2008 CX_{142}	—	February 8, 2008	Kitt Peak	Spacewatch	·	790 m	MPC · JPL
263359	2008 CB_{146}	—	February 9, 2008	Kitt Peak	Spacewatch	·	2.4 km	MPC · JPL
263360	2008 CK_{147}	—	February 9, 2008	Kitt Peak	Spacewatch	·	850 m	MPC · JPL
263361	2008 CU_{152}	—	February 9, 2008	Catalina	CSS	(2076)	850 m	MPC · JPL
263362	2008 CC_{155}	—	February 9, 2008	Mount Lemmon	Mount Lemmon Survey	·	2.6 km	MPC · JPL
263363	2008 CM_{157}	—	February 9, 2008	Catalina	CSS	·	790 m	MPC · JPL
263364	2008 CO_{157}	—	February 9, 2008	Catalina	CSS	V	800 m	MPC · JPL
263365	2008 CW_{158}	—	February 9, 2008	Kitt Peak	Spacewatch	·	930 m	MPC · JPL
263366	2008 CY_{158}	—	February 9, 2008	Kitt Peak	Spacewatch	·	650 m	MPC · JPL
263367	2008 CZ_{158}	—	February 9, 2008	Catalina	CSS	·	4.8 km	MPC · JPL
263368	2008 CE_{160}	—	February 9, 2008	Kitt Peak	Spacewatch	·	1.0 km	MPC · JPL
263369	2008 CQ_{163}	—	February 10, 2008	Catalina	CSS	·	970 m	MPC · JPL
263370	2008 CT_{163}	—	February 10, 2008	Catalina	CSS	·	2.9 km	MPC · JPL
263371	2008 CE_{166}	—	February 10, 2008	Kitt Peak	Spacewatch	NYS	1.1 km	MPC · JPL
263372	2008 CM_{166}	—	February 10, 2008	Kitt Peak	Spacewatch	NYS	1.3 km	MPC · JPL
263373	2008 CG_{168}	—	February 11, 2008	Mount Lemmon	Mount Lemmon Survey	·	770 m	MPC · JPL
263374	2008 CN_{172}	—	February 13, 2008	Kitt Peak	Spacewatch	·	1.7 km	MPC · JPL
263375	2008 CH_{175}	—	February 6, 2008	Socorro	LINEAR	·	1.1 km	MPC · JPL
263376	2008 CB_{179}	—	February 6, 2008	Catalina	CSS	·	3.3 km	MPC · JPL
263377	2008 CR_{180}	—	February 9, 2008	Catalina	CSS	·	2.4 km	MPC · JPL
263378	2008 CL_{181}	—	February 13, 2008	Catalina	CSS	·	2.0 km	MPC · JPL
263379	2008 CN_{181}	—	February 13, 2008	Anderson Mesa	LONEOS	·	2.7 km	MPC · JPL
263380	2008 CN_{184}	—	February 9, 2008	Kitt Peak	Spacewatch	V	810 m	MPC · JPL
263381	2008 CD_{188}	—	February 3, 2008	Catalina	CSS	·	1.6 km	MPC · JPL
263382	2008 CM_{192}	—	February 3, 2008	Catalina	CSS	MAR	1.6 km	MPC · JPL
263383	2008 CR_{194}	—	February 12, 2008	Kitt Peak	Spacewatch	NYS	1.1 km	MPC · JPL
263384	2008 CF_{198}	—	February 11, 2008	Mount Lemmon	Mount Lemmon Survey	·	1.6 km	MPC · JPL
263385	2008 CH_{200}	—	February 11, 2008	Mount Lemmon	Mount Lemmon Survey	CYB	4.9 km	MPC · JPL
263386	2008 CW_{203}	—	February 13, 2008	Kitt Peak	Spacewatch	·	1.2 km	MPC · JPL
263387	2008 CM_{204}	—	February 8, 2008	Mount Lemmon	Mount Lemmon Survey	·	870 m	MPC · JPL
263388	2008 CA_{205}	—	February 1, 2008	Kitt Peak	Spacewatch	·	2.8 km	MPC · JPL
263389	2008 CR_{210}	—	February 2, 2008	Kitt Peak	Spacewatch	·	2.3 km	MPC · JPL
263390	2008 CP_{215}	—	February 13, 2008	Mount Lemmon	Mount Lemmon Survey	·	930 m	MPC · JPL
263391 Grüntzig	2008 DA	Grüntzig	February 16, 2008	Taunus	E. Schwab, R. Kling	EOS	2.3 km	MPC · JPL
263392	2008 DH_{1}	—	February 24, 2008	Kitt Peak	Spacewatch	·	760 m	MPC · JPL
263393	2008 DX_{4}	—	February 28, 2008	Bisei SG Center	BATTeRS	·	2.6 km	MPC · JPL
263394	2008 DY_{6}	—	February 24, 2008	Kitt Peak	Spacewatch	(2076)	880 m	MPC · JPL
263395	2008 DL_{7}	—	February 24, 2008	Mount Lemmon	Mount Lemmon Survey	·	870 m	MPC · JPL
263396	2008 DS_{10}	—	February 26, 2008	Kitt Peak	Spacewatch	·	3.2 km	MPC · JPL
263397	2008 DF_{13}	—	February 26, 2008	Mount Lemmon	Mount Lemmon Survey	·	4.1 km	MPC · JPL
263398	2008 DA_{15}	—	February 26, 2008	Mount Lemmon	Mount Lemmon Survey	·	2.1 km	MPC · JPL
263399	2008 DO_{16}	—	February 27, 2008	Mount Lemmon	Mount Lemmon Survey	EOS	2.3 km	MPC · JPL
263400	2008 DR_{16}	—	February 27, 2008	Kitt Peak	Spacewatch	·	1.9 km	MPC · JPL

== 263401–263500 ==
back to top

Designation			Discovery			Properties		Ref
Permanent	Provisional	Named after	Date	Site	Discoverer(s)	Category	Diam.	Ref
263401	2008 DE_{17}	—	February 26, 2008	Socorro	LINEAR	·	790 m	MPC · JPL
263402	2008 DO_{18}	—	February 26, 2008	Mount Lemmon	Mount Lemmon Survey	·	3.2 km	MPC · JPL
263403	2008 DD_{24}	—	February 27, 2008	Catalina	CSS	·	940 m	MPC · JPL
263404	2008 DT_{25}	—	February 29, 2008	Purple Mountain	PMO NEO Survey Program	·	1.6 km	MPC · JPL
263405	2008 DE_{26}	—	February 29, 2008	Purple Mountain	PMO NEO Survey Program	·	1.7 km	MPC · JPL
263406	2008 DM_{26}	—	February 26, 2008	Kitt Peak	Spacewatch	·	3.2 km	MPC · JPL
263407	2008 DQ_{26}	—	February 28, 2008	Kitt Peak	Spacewatch	·	1.6 km	MPC · JPL
263408	2008 DY_{26}	—	February 28, 2008	Kitt Peak	Spacewatch	·	4.6 km	MPC · JPL
263409	2008 DO_{34}	—	February 27, 2008	Catalina	CSS	·	1.2 km	MPC · JPL
263410	2008 DY_{35}	—	February 27, 2008	Mount Lemmon	Mount Lemmon Survey	KOR	1.7 km	MPC · JPL
263411	2008 DO_{36}	—	February 27, 2008	Mount Lemmon	Mount Lemmon Survey	·	1.2 km	MPC · JPL
263412	2008 DR_{37}	—	February 27, 2008	Mount Lemmon	Mount Lemmon Survey	·	1.3 km	MPC · JPL
263413	2008 DM_{38}	—	February 27, 2008	Kitt Peak	Spacewatch	NEM	2.7 km	MPC · JPL
263414	2008 DE_{42}	—	February 28, 2008	Kitt Peak	Spacewatch	·	2.1 km	MPC · JPL
263415	2008 DB_{44}	—	February 28, 2008	Mount Lemmon	Mount Lemmon Survey	NYS	1.5 km	MPC · JPL
263416	2008 DT_{44}	—	February 28, 2008	Mount Lemmon	Mount Lemmon Survey	JUN	1.2 km	MPC · JPL
263417	2008 DN_{45}	—	February 28, 2008	Kitt Peak	Spacewatch	NYS	1.2 km	MPC · JPL
263418	2008 DS_{45}	—	February 28, 2008	Kitt Peak	Spacewatch	·	3.9 km	MPC · JPL
263419	2008 DE_{47}	—	February 28, 2008	Kitt Peak	Spacewatch	NYS	1.2 km	MPC · JPL
263420	2008 DL_{47}	—	February 28, 2008	Kitt Peak	Spacewatch	·	1.7 km	MPC · JPL
263421	2008 DC_{49}	—	February 29, 2008	Catalina	CSS	·	1.8 km	MPC · JPL
263422	2008 DK_{50}	—	February 29, 2008	Kitt Peak	Spacewatch	NYS	1.5 km	MPC · JPL
263423	2008 DO_{52}	—	February 29, 2008	Mount Lemmon	Mount Lemmon Survey	SYL · CYB	5.6 km	MPC · JPL
263424	2008 DV_{54}	—	February 28, 2008	Catalina	CSS	·	2.3 km	MPC · JPL
263425	2008 DB_{57}	—	February 27, 2008	Catalina	CSS	·	3.8 km	MPC · JPL
263426	2008 DN_{65}	—	February 28, 2008	Catalina	CSS	JUN	1.3 km	MPC · JPL
263427	2008 DQ_{65}	—	February 28, 2008	Kitt Peak	Spacewatch	·	2.5 km	MPC · JPL
263428	2008 DD_{67}	—	February 29, 2008	Kitt Peak	Spacewatch	·	2.8 km	MPC · JPL
263429	2008 DO_{67}	—	February 29, 2008	Kitt Peak	Spacewatch	·	3.7 km	MPC · JPL
263430	2008 DH_{68}	—	February 29, 2008	Kitt Peak	Spacewatch	·	1.6 km	MPC · JPL
263431	2008 DY_{68}	—	February 29, 2008	Kitt Peak	Spacewatch	·	1.1 km	MPC · JPL
263432	2008 DA_{69}	—	February 29, 2008	Kitt Peak	Spacewatch	THM	2.8 km	MPC · JPL
263433	2008 DB_{69}	—	February 29, 2008	Kitt Peak	Spacewatch	KOR	2.1 km	MPC · JPL
263434	2008 DK_{70}	—	February 27, 2008	Catalina	CSS	·	1.8 km	MPC · JPL
263435	2008 DP_{70}	—	February 27, 2008	Catalina	CSS	·	3.1 km	MPC · JPL
263436	2008 DB_{74}	—	February 27, 2008	Mount Lemmon	Mount Lemmon Survey	NYS	1.2 km	MPC · JPL
263437	2008 DW_{75}	—	February 28, 2008	Mount Lemmon	Mount Lemmon Survey	·	1.6 km	MPC · JPL
263438	2008 DO_{78}	—	February 28, 2008	Mount Lemmon	Mount Lemmon Survey	·	1.5 km	MPC · JPL
263439	2008 DW_{78}	—	February 28, 2008	Purple Mountain	PMO NEO Survey Program	PHO	1.5 km	MPC · JPL
263440	2008 DF_{79}	—	February 29, 2008	Purple Mountain	PMO NEO Survey Program	·	3.2 km	MPC · JPL
263441	2008 DP_{79}	—	February 29, 2008	Catalina	CSS	MAR	1.4 km	MPC · JPL
263442	2008 DE_{83}	—	February 28, 2008	Kitt Peak	Spacewatch	EOS	1.9 km	MPC · JPL
263443	2008 DR_{83}	—	February 26, 2008	Mount Lemmon	Mount Lemmon Survey	·	2.0 km	MPC · JPL
263444	2008 DY_{86}	—	February 26, 2008	Kitt Peak	Spacewatch	·	3.2 km	MPC · JPL
263445	2008 DZ_{86}	—	February 26, 2008	Kitt Peak	Spacewatch	·	2.5 km	MPC · JPL
263446	2008 DK_{88}	—	February 18, 2008	Mount Lemmon	Mount Lemmon Survey	·	1.6 km	MPC · JPL
263447	2008 EA_{1}	—	March 1, 2008	Kachina	Hobart, J.	PHO	1.0 km	MPC · JPL
263448	2008 EG_{1}	—	March 3, 2008	Dauban	Kugel, F.	·	1.7 km	MPC · JPL
263449	2008 EY_{1}	—	March 1, 2008	Kitt Peak	Spacewatch	AGN	1.2 km	MPC · JPL
263450	2008 ET_{2}	—	March 1, 2008	Mount Lemmon	Mount Lemmon Survey	·	3.9 km	MPC · JPL
263451	2008 EL_{4}	—	March 2, 2008	Catalina	CSS	·	1.7 km	MPC · JPL
263452	2008 EE_{6}	—	March 2, 2008	Mount Lemmon	Mount Lemmon Survey	V	820 m	MPC · JPL
263453	2008 EZ_{6}	—	March 4, 2008	Mayhill	Lowe, A.	·	2.9 km	MPC · JPL
263454	2008 EA_{12}	—	March 1, 2008	Kitt Peak	Spacewatch	MRX	1.6 km	MPC · JPL
263455	2008 ER_{14}	—	March 1, 2008	Kitt Peak	Spacewatch	·	1.7 km	MPC · JPL
263456	2008 ER_{15}	—	March 1, 2008	Kitt Peak	Spacewatch	·	2.4 km	MPC · JPL
263457	2008 EX_{16}	—	March 1, 2008	Kitt Peak	Spacewatch	MAS	880 m	MPC · JPL
263458	2008 EG_{17}	—	March 1, 2008	Kitt Peak	Spacewatch	·	2.8 km	MPC · JPL
263459	2008 EL_{22}	—	March 2, 2008	Purple Mountain	PMO NEO Survey Program	·	3.2 km	MPC · JPL
263460	2008 EM_{22}	—	March 2, 2008	Purple Mountain	PMO NEO Survey Program	·	3.3 km	MPC · JPL
263461	2008 EK_{29}	—	March 4, 2008	Mount Lemmon	Mount Lemmon Survey	EUN	1.8 km	MPC · JPL
263462	2008 EO_{34}	—	March 2, 2008	Kitt Peak	Spacewatch	NYS	1.0 km	MPC · JPL
263463	2008 EP_{34}	—	March 2, 2008	Catalina	CSS	·	6.0 km	MPC · JPL
263464	2008 ET_{35}	—	March 3, 2008	Kitt Peak	Spacewatch	·	2.1 km	MPC · JPL
263465	2008 EL_{42}	—	March 4, 2008	Kitt Peak	Spacewatch	·	2.6 km	MPC · JPL
263466	2008 EF_{43}	—	March 4, 2008	Mount Lemmon	Mount Lemmon Survey	(12739)	2.5 km	MPC · JPL
263467	2008 EM_{48}	—	March 5, 2008	Kitt Peak	Spacewatch	·	2.5 km	MPC · JPL
263468	2008 EG_{53}	—	March 6, 2008	Mount Lemmon	Mount Lemmon Survey	·	1.5 km	MPC · JPL
263469	2008 EX_{57}	—	March 7, 2008	Mount Lemmon	Mount Lemmon Survey	·	1.2 km	MPC · JPL
263470	2008 EX_{59}	—	March 8, 2008	Catalina	CSS	·	1.1 km	MPC · JPL
263471	2008 ET_{66}	—	September 23, 2005	Catalina	CSS	AGN	1.5 km	MPC · JPL
263472	2008 ES_{67}	—	March 9, 2008	Mount Lemmon	Mount Lemmon Survey	·	1.2 km	MPC · JPL
263473	2008 EZ_{67}	—	March 9, 2008	Mount Lemmon	Mount Lemmon Survey	·	2.4 km	MPC · JPL
263474	2008 EL_{71}	—	March 6, 2008	Mount Lemmon	Mount Lemmon Survey	·	2.1 km	MPC · JPL
263475	2008 EK_{73}	—	March 7, 2008	Catalina	CSS	MAR	1.3 km	MPC · JPL
263476	2008 EZ_{75}	—	March 7, 2008	Kitt Peak	Spacewatch	·	910 m	MPC · JPL
263477	2008 EH_{77}	—	March 7, 2008	Kitt Peak	Spacewatch	·	1.1 km	MPC · JPL
263478	2008 EM_{77}	—	March 7, 2008	Kitt Peak	Spacewatch	·	2.4 km	MPC · JPL
263479	2008 EF_{78}	—	March 7, 2008	Kitt Peak	Spacewatch	VER	4.6 km	MPC · JPL
263480	2008 EP_{79}	—	March 8, 2008	Catalina	CSS	·	1.6 km	MPC · JPL
263481	2008 EF_{80}	—	March 9, 2008	Kitt Peak	Spacewatch	·	1.7 km	MPC · JPL
263482	2008 EJ_{80}	—	March 9, 2008	Kitt Peak	Spacewatch	·	2.9 km	MPC · JPL
263483	2008 EC_{83}	—	March 8, 2008	Socorro	LINEAR	·	4.6 km	MPC · JPL
263484	2008 EJ_{83}	—	March 9, 2008	Socorro	LINEAR	·	1.2 km	MPC · JPL
263485	2008 ER_{84}	—	March 11, 2008	Bisei SG Center	BATTeRS	PHO	1.2 km	MPC · JPL
263486	2008 EY_{86}	—	March 7, 2008	Kitt Peak	Spacewatch	EOS ·	4.8 km	MPC · JPL
263487	2008 EV_{87}	—	March 10, 2008	Mount Lemmon	Mount Lemmon Survey	·	2.6 km	MPC · JPL
263488	2008 EE_{89}	—	March 8, 2008	Socorro	LINEAR	·	4.7 km	MPC · JPL
263489	2008 EJ_{89}	—	March 8, 2008	Socorro	LINEAR	·	990 m	MPC · JPL
263490	2008 EK_{92}	—	March 3, 2008	Catalina	CSS	VER	3.5 km	MPC · JPL
263491	2008 EY_{93}	—	March 3, 2008	Mount Lemmon	Mount Lemmon Survey	·	2.4 km	MPC · JPL
263492	2008 EY_{94}	—	March 5, 2008	Mount Lemmon	Mount Lemmon Survey	·	1.3 km	MPC · JPL
263493	2008 EX_{96}	—	March 7, 2008	Mount Lemmon	Mount Lemmon Survey	·	1.8 km	MPC · JPL
263494	2008 EP_{100}	—	March 3, 2008	Lulin	LUSS	CYB	5.0 km	MPC · JPL
263495	2008 EV_{100}	—	March 9, 2008	Kitt Peak	Spacewatch	MAS	910 m	MPC · JPL
263496	2008 EY_{103}	—	March 5, 2008	Kitt Peak	Spacewatch	EOS	2.4 km	MPC · JPL
263497	2008 EW_{105}	—	March 6, 2008	Mount Lemmon	Mount Lemmon Survey	·	2.1 km	MPC · JPL
263498	2008 EY_{106}	—	March 6, 2008	Mount Lemmon	Mount Lemmon Survey	·	3.0 km	MPC · JPL
263499	2008 ET_{116}	—	March 8, 2008	Kitt Peak	Spacewatch	·	2.2 km	MPC · JPL
263500	2008 EV_{118}	—	March 9, 2008	Mount Lemmon	Mount Lemmon Survey	·	1.1 km	MPC · JPL

== 263501–263600 ==
back to top

Designation			Discovery			Properties		Ref
Permanent	Provisional	Named after	Date	Site	Discoverer(s)	Category	Diam.	Ref
263501	2008 EG_{120}	—	March 9, 2008	Kitt Peak	Spacewatch	·	1.1 km	MPC · JPL
263502	2008 EX_{120}	—	March 9, 2008	Kitt Peak	Spacewatch	·	3.2 km	MPC · JPL
263503	2008 EP_{121}	—	March 9, 2008	Kitt Peak	Spacewatch	·	1.8 km	MPC · JPL
263504	2008 EP_{122}	—	March 9, 2008	Kitt Peak	Spacewatch	·	2.0 km	MPC · JPL
263505	2008 EC_{123}	—	March 9, 2008	Kitt Peak	Spacewatch	·	1.5 km	MPC · JPL
263506	2008 EF_{126}	—	March 10, 2008	Kitt Peak	Spacewatch	(11882)	1.9 km	MPC · JPL
263507	2008 EG_{126}	—	March 10, 2008	Kitt Peak	Spacewatch	·	1.6 km	MPC · JPL
263508	2008 EV_{126}	—	March 10, 2008	Catalina	CSS	·	2.1 km	MPC · JPL
263509	2008 EF_{129}	—	March 11, 2008	Kitt Peak	Spacewatch	·	1.1 km	MPC · JPL
263510	2008 EG_{135}	—	March 11, 2008	Kitt Peak	Spacewatch	VER	3.5 km	MPC · JPL
263511	2008 EE_{136}	—	March 11, 2008	Kitt Peak	Spacewatch	·	1.1 km	MPC · JPL
263512	2008 EP_{139}	—	March 11, 2008	Kitt Peak	Spacewatch	·	1.4 km	MPC · JPL
263513	2008 ER_{141}	—	March 12, 2008	Mount Lemmon	Mount Lemmon Survey	·	1.3 km	MPC · JPL
263514	2008 EM_{143}	—	March 14, 2008	Catalina	CSS	LIX	6.4 km	MPC · JPL
263515	2008 EB_{144}	—	March 8, 2008	Kitt Peak	Spacewatch	·	4.0 km	MPC · JPL
263516 Alexescu	2008 EW_{144}	Alexescu	March 13, 2008	La Silla	EURONEAR	V	880 m	MPC · JPL
263517	2008 ES_{147}	—	March 1, 2008	Kitt Peak	Spacewatch	THM	2.2 km	MPC · JPL
263518	2008 EA_{149}	—	March 2, 2008	Kitt Peak	Spacewatch	·	1.2 km	MPC · JPL
263519	2008 EC_{149}	—	March 2, 2008	Purple Mountain	PMO NEO Survey Program	·	1.1 km	MPC · JPL
263520	2008 EO_{149}	—	March 4, 2008	Kitt Peak	Spacewatch	V	740 m	MPC · JPL
263521	2008 EQ_{149}	—	March 4, 2008	Purple Mountain	PMO NEO Survey Program	V	950 m	MPC · JPL
263522	2008 EN_{153}	—	March 12, 2008	Kitt Peak	Spacewatch	·	710 m	MPC · JPL
263523	2008 ET_{153}	—	March 13, 2008	Catalina	CSS	·	5.2 km	MPC · JPL
263524	2008 EZ_{153}	—	March 15, 2008	Kitt Peak	Spacewatch	·	2.1 km	MPC · JPL
263525	2008 EG_{157}	—	March 15, 2008	Mount Lemmon	Mount Lemmon Survey	GEF	1.3 km	MPC · JPL
263526	2008 ET_{157}	—	March 2, 2008	Kitt Peak	Spacewatch	EOS	2.0 km	MPC · JPL
263527	2008 EK_{158}	—	March 10, 2008	Kitt Peak	Spacewatch	·	1.1 km	MPC · JPL
263528	2008 EZ_{159}	—	March 5, 2008	Kitt Peak	Spacewatch	·	1.7 km	MPC · JPL
263529	2008 EM_{163}	—	March 13, 2008	Catalina	CSS	·	4.9 km	MPC · JPL
263530	2008 ED_{166}	—	March 5, 2008	Kitt Peak	Spacewatch	·	2.1 km	MPC · JPL
263531	2008 FM_{1}	—	March 25, 2008	Kitt Peak	Spacewatch	·	1.5 km	MPC · JPL
263532	2008 FY_{2}	—	March 25, 2008	Kitt Peak	Spacewatch	AGN	1.5 km	MPC · JPL
263533	2008 FZ_{2}	—	March 25, 2008	Kitt Peak	Spacewatch	·	1.4 km	MPC · JPL
263534	2008 FT_{3}	—	March 25, 2008	Kitt Peak	Spacewatch	·	4.3 km	MPC · JPL
263535	2008 FN_{7}	—	March 30, 2008	Modra	Gajdoš, S., Világi, J.	·	1.6 km	MPC · JPL
263536	2008 FU_{7}	—	March 25, 2008	Kitt Peak	Spacewatch	·	2.7 km	MPC · JPL
263537	2008 FK_{8}	—	March 25, 2008	Kitt Peak	Spacewatch	·	2.7 km	MPC · JPL
263538	2008 FS_{14}	—	March 26, 2008	Mount Lemmon	Mount Lemmon Survey	·	940 m	MPC · JPL
263539	2008 FN_{16}	—	March 27, 2008	Mount Lemmon	Mount Lemmon Survey	·	2.3 km	MPC · JPL
263540	2008 FA_{17}	—	March 27, 2008	Kitt Peak	Spacewatch	·	2.5 km	MPC · JPL
263541	2008 FR_{20}	—	March 27, 2008	Kitt Peak	Spacewatch	·	2.2 km	MPC · JPL
263542	2008 FJ_{27}	—	March 27, 2008	Kitt Peak	Spacewatch	·	1.7 km	MPC · JPL
263543	2008 FA_{28}	—	March 27, 2008	Kitt Peak	Spacewatch	·	2.7 km	MPC · JPL
263544	2008 FE_{28}	—	March 27, 2008	Lulin	LUSS	NYS	1.2 km	MPC · JPL
263545	2008 FE_{29}	—	March 28, 2008	Kitt Peak	Spacewatch	·	1.2 km	MPC · JPL
263546	2008 FJ_{31}	—	March 28, 2008	Mount Lemmon	Mount Lemmon Survey	NYS	1.2 km	MPC · JPL
263547	2008 FQ_{35}	—	March 28, 2008	Mount Lemmon	Mount Lemmon Survey	·	1.1 km	MPC · JPL
263548	2008 FM_{41}	—	March 28, 2008	Mount Lemmon	Mount Lemmon Survey	·	2.9 km	MPC · JPL
263549	2008 FV_{41}	—	March 28, 2008	Mount Lemmon	Mount Lemmon Survey	·	1.8 km	MPC · JPL
263550	2008 FR_{48}	—	March 28, 2008	Mount Lemmon	Mount Lemmon Survey	·	2.4 km	MPC · JPL
263551	2008 FF_{50}	—	March 28, 2008	Mount Lemmon	Mount Lemmon Survey	·	2.8 km	MPC · JPL
263552	2008 FR_{50}	—	March 28, 2008	Kitt Peak	Spacewatch	·	2.7 km	MPC · JPL
263553	2008 FB_{54}	—	March 28, 2008	Mount Lemmon	Mount Lemmon Survey	·	2.1 km	MPC · JPL
263554	2008 FH_{55}	—	March 28, 2008	Mount Lemmon	Mount Lemmon Survey	NEM	2.4 km	MPC · JPL
263555	2008 FM_{57}	—	March 28, 2008	Mount Lemmon	Mount Lemmon Survey	NYS	1.1 km	MPC · JPL
263556	2008 FU_{57}	—	March 28, 2008	Kitt Peak	Spacewatch	·	4.0 km	MPC · JPL
263557	2008 FP_{59}	—	March 29, 2008	Kitt Peak	Spacewatch	·	2.6 km	MPC · JPL
263558	2008 FW_{60}	—	March 29, 2008	Mount Lemmon	Mount Lemmon Survey	·	2.1 km	MPC · JPL
263559	2008 FZ_{60}	—	March 29, 2008	Mount Lemmon	Mount Lemmon Survey	·	1.9 km	MPC · JPL
263560	2008 FJ_{61}	—	March 30, 2008	Catalina	CSS	·	1.8 km	MPC · JPL
263561	2008 FX_{67}	—	March 28, 2008	Kitt Peak	Spacewatch	·	1.2 km	MPC · JPL
263562	2008 FY_{67}	—	March 28, 2008	Mount Lemmon	Mount Lemmon Survey	HOF	3.3 km	MPC · JPL
263563	2008 FL_{68}	—	March 28, 2008	Mount Lemmon	Mount Lemmon Survey	·	1.5 km	MPC · JPL
263564	2008 FS_{69}	—	March 28, 2008	Kitt Peak	Spacewatch	·	1.9 km	MPC · JPL
263565	2008 FB_{70}	—	March 28, 2008	Kitt Peak	Spacewatch	·	2.0 km	MPC · JPL
263566	2008 FQ_{70}	—	March 28, 2008	Kitt Peak	Spacewatch	·	2.5 km	MPC · JPL
263567	2008 FU_{70}	—	March 29, 2008	Catalina	CSS	·	1.4 km	MPC · JPL
263568	2008 FH_{71}	—	March 29, 2008	Catalina	CSS	·	1.7 km	MPC · JPL
263569	2008 FO_{71}	—	March 30, 2008	Kitt Peak	Spacewatch	·	1.3 km	MPC · JPL
263570	2008 FV_{75}	—	March 29, 2008	Catalina	CSS	·	1.4 km	MPC · JPL
263571	2008 FZ_{75}	—	March 30, 2008	Socorro	LINEAR	·	2.9 km	MPC · JPL
263572	2008 FL_{77}	—	March 27, 2008	Mount Lemmon	Mount Lemmon Survey	·	1.3 km	MPC · JPL
263573	2008 FX_{77}	—	March 27, 2008	Mount Lemmon	Mount Lemmon Survey	NEM	2.6 km	MPC · JPL
263574	2008 FV_{79}	—	March 27, 2008	Mount Lemmon	Mount Lemmon Survey	·	2.6 km	MPC · JPL
263575	2008 FR_{82}	—	March 28, 2008	Kitt Peak	Spacewatch	EOS	2.2 km	MPC · JPL
263576	2008 FT_{82}	—	March 28, 2008	Mount Lemmon	Mount Lemmon Survey	·	1.2 km	MPC · JPL
263577	2008 FG_{83}	—	March 28, 2008	Kitt Peak	Spacewatch	AGN	1.2 km	MPC · JPL
263578	2008 FB_{84}	—	March 28, 2008	Kitt Peak	Spacewatch	·	2.0 km	MPC · JPL
263579	2008 FR_{88}	—	March 28, 2008	Mount Lemmon	Mount Lemmon Survey	KOR	1.4 km	MPC · JPL
263580	2008 FC_{90}	—	March 29, 2008	Mount Lemmon	Mount Lemmon Survey	·	1.1 km	MPC · JPL
263581	2008 FN_{90}	—	March 29, 2008	Mount Lemmon	Mount Lemmon Survey	·	1.3 km	MPC · JPL
263582	2008 FE_{92}	—	March 29, 2008	Mount Lemmon	Mount Lemmon Survey	·	930 m	MPC · JPL
263583	2008 FK_{93}	—	March 29, 2008	Mount Lemmon	Mount Lemmon Survey	·	1.2 km	MPC · JPL
263584	2008 FZ_{96}	—	March 29, 2008	Kitt Peak	Spacewatch	·	2.4 km	MPC · JPL
263585	2008 FX_{98}	—	March 30, 2008	Kitt Peak	Spacewatch	TEL	1.7 km	MPC · JPL
263586	2008 FS_{104}	—	March 30, 2008	Kitt Peak	Spacewatch	·	3.4 km	MPC · JPL
263587	2008 FF_{105}	—	March 31, 2008	Kitt Peak	Spacewatch	·	2.6 km	MPC · JPL
263588	2008 FH_{107}	—	March 31, 2008	Kitt Peak	Spacewatch	·	3.7 km	MPC · JPL
263589	2008 FY_{107}	—	March 31, 2008	Kitt Peak	Spacewatch	·	840 m	MPC · JPL
263590	2008 FY_{110}	—	March 31, 2008	Kitt Peak	Spacewatch	·	4.5 km	MPC · JPL
263591	2008 FT_{112}	—	March 31, 2008	Kitt Peak	Spacewatch	KOR	1.4 km	MPC · JPL
263592	2008 FJ_{115}	—	March 31, 2008	Mount Lemmon	Mount Lemmon Survey	KOR	1.7 km	MPC · JPL
263593	2008 FM_{115}	—	March 31, 2008	Mount Lemmon	Mount Lemmon Survey	·	2.7 km	MPC · JPL
263594	2008 FR_{115}	—	March 31, 2008	Mount Lemmon	Mount Lemmon Survey	·	1.2 km	MPC · JPL
263595	2008 FR_{117}	—	March 31, 2008	Kitt Peak	Spacewatch	·	1.6 km	MPC · JPL
263596	2008 FC_{121}	—	March 31, 2008	Mount Lemmon	Mount Lemmon Survey	(5)	1.6 km	MPC · JPL
263597	2008 FF_{124}	—	March 29, 2008	Kitt Peak	Spacewatch	AGN	1.6 km	MPC · JPL
263598	2008 FX_{124}	—	March 30, 2008	Kitt Peak	Spacewatch	·	1.9 km	MPC · JPL
263599	2008 FE_{125}	—	March 30, 2008	Kitt Peak	Spacewatch	·	3.8 km	MPC · JPL
263600	2008 FO_{125}	—	March 31, 2008	Kitt Peak	Spacewatch	·	1.3 km	MPC · JPL

== 263601–263700 ==
back to top

Designation			Discovery			Properties		Ref
Permanent	Provisional	Named after	Date	Site	Discoverer(s)	Category	Diam.	Ref
263601	2008 FS_{129}	—	March 31, 2008	Kitt Peak	Spacewatch	·	1.4 km	MPC · JPL
263602	2008 FW_{130}	—	March 31, 2008	Kitt Peak	Spacewatch	·	1.8 km	MPC · JPL
263603	2008 FX_{130}	—	March 31, 2008	Catalina	CSS	·	2.1 km	MPC · JPL
263604	2008 FN_{131}	—	March 29, 2008	Catalina	CSS	·	5.7 km	MPC · JPL
263605	2008 FP_{132}	—	March 28, 2008	Mount Lemmon	Mount Lemmon Survey	·	2.2 km	MPC · JPL
263606	2008 FS_{133}	—	March 28, 2008	Mount Lemmon	Mount Lemmon Survey	·	1.6 km	MPC · JPL
263607	2008 FN_{135}	—	March 31, 2008	Mount Lemmon	Mount Lemmon Survey	·	1.6 km	MPC · JPL
263608	2008 FP_{135}	—	March 31, 2008	Mount Lemmon	Mount Lemmon Survey	·	2.5 km	MPC · JPL
263609	2008 FO_{136}	—	March 28, 2008	Kitt Peak	Spacewatch	·	2.1 km	MPC · JPL
263610	2008 FP_{136}	—	March 28, 2008	Mount Lemmon	Mount Lemmon Survey	V	820 m	MPC · JPL
263611	2008 FY_{136}	—	March 29, 2008	Catalina	CSS	·	3.0 km	MPC · JPL
263612	2008 GJ_{1}	—	April 3, 2008	La Sagra	OAM	·	1.4 km	MPC · JPL
263613 Enol	2008 GM_{1}	Enol	April 3, 2008	La Cañada	Lacruz, J.	·	770 m	MPC · JPL
263614	2008 GH_{3}	—	April 1, 2008	Goodricke-Pigott	R. A. Tucker	·	6.3 km	MPC · JPL
263615	2008 GA_{5}	—	April 1, 2008	Kitt Peak	Spacewatch	·	3.3 km	MPC · JPL
263616	2008 GD_{11}	—	April 1, 2008	Kitt Peak	Spacewatch	·	1.9 km	MPC · JPL
263617	2008 GG_{14}	—	April 3, 2008	Mount Lemmon	Mount Lemmon Survey	·	5.6 km	MPC · JPL
263618	2008 GR_{14}	—	April 3, 2008	Kitt Peak	Spacewatch	·	1.8 km	MPC · JPL
263619	2008 GR_{23}	—	April 1, 2008	Mount Lemmon	Mount Lemmon Survey	·	1.8 km	MPC · JPL
263620	2008 GJ_{24}	—	April 1, 2008	Mount Lemmon	Mount Lemmon Survey	ELF	5.3 km	MPC · JPL
263621	2008 GE_{34}	—	April 3, 2008	Mount Lemmon	Mount Lemmon Survey	MAS	630 m	MPC · JPL
263622	2008 GS_{36}	—	April 3, 2008	Kitt Peak	Spacewatch	·	1.5 km	MPC · JPL
263623	2008 GH_{39}	—	April 3, 2008	Kitt Peak	Spacewatch	·	3.7 km	MPC · JPL
263624	2008 GV_{41}	—	April 4, 2008	Kitt Peak	Spacewatch	EOS	2.4 km	MPC · JPL
263625	2008 GM_{42}	—	April 4, 2008	Kitt Peak	Spacewatch	·	2.4 km	MPC · JPL
263626	2008 GS_{42}	—	April 4, 2008	Kitt Peak	Spacewatch	·	5.5 km	MPC · JPL
263627	2008 GF_{47}	—	April 4, 2008	Kitt Peak	Spacewatch	·	2.1 km	MPC · JPL
263628	2008 GK_{48}	—	April 5, 2008	Kitt Peak	Spacewatch	·	1.8 km	MPC · JPL
263629	2008 GN_{49}	—	April 5, 2008	Kitt Peak	Spacewatch	·	2.0 km	MPC · JPL
263630	2008 GU_{58}	—	April 5, 2008	Mount Lemmon	Mount Lemmon Survey	·	2.8 km	MPC · JPL
263631	2008 GF_{59}	—	April 5, 2008	Mount Lemmon	Mount Lemmon Survey	·	1.5 km	MPC · JPL
263632	2008 GW_{59}	—	April 5, 2008	Catalina	CSS	·	2.5 km	MPC · JPL
263633	2008 GQ_{60}	—	April 5, 2008	Catalina	CSS	·	2.9 km	MPC · JPL
263634	2008 GY_{60}	—	April 5, 2008	Catalina	CSS	·	1.2 km	MPC · JPL
263635	2008 GM_{66}	—	April 6, 2008	Kitt Peak	Spacewatch	·	2.3 km	MPC · JPL
263636	2008 GH_{67}	—	April 6, 2008	Kitt Peak	Spacewatch	THM	3.6 km	MPC · JPL
263637	2008 GC_{70}	—	April 6, 2008	Mount Lemmon	Mount Lemmon Survey	·	4.4 km	MPC · JPL
263638	2008 GN_{70}	—	April 6, 2008	Mount Lemmon	Mount Lemmon Survey	·	3.1 km	MPC · JPL
263639	2008 GF_{73}	—	April 7, 2008	Mount Lemmon	Mount Lemmon Survey	MAS	630 m	MPC · JPL
263640	2008 GC_{77}	—	April 7, 2008	Kitt Peak	Spacewatch	·	3.9 km	MPC · JPL
263641	2008 GX_{77}	—	April 7, 2008	Kitt Peak	Spacewatch	·	2.6 km	MPC · JPL
263642	2008 GN_{78}	—	April 7, 2008	Kitt Peak	Spacewatch	·	3.3 km	MPC · JPL
263643	2008 GX_{78}	—	April 7, 2008	Kitt Peak	Spacewatch	BRA	1.5 km	MPC · JPL
263644	2008 GW_{79}	—	April 7, 2008	Kitt Peak	Spacewatch	·	2.6 km	MPC · JPL
263645	2008 GD_{83}	—	April 8, 2008	Kitt Peak	Spacewatch	·	1.5 km	MPC · JPL
263646	2008 GH_{85}	—	April 8, 2008	Mount Lemmon	Mount Lemmon Survey	AGN	1.6 km	MPC · JPL
263647	2008 GK_{86}	—	April 9, 2008	Kitt Peak	Spacewatch	MAS	790 m	MPC · JPL
263648	2008 GN_{86}	—	April 9, 2008	Kitt Peak	Spacewatch	·	1.5 km	MPC · JPL
263649	2008 GD_{88}	—	April 6, 2008	Kitt Peak	Spacewatch	·	1.9 km	MPC · JPL
263650	2008 GE_{89}	—	April 6, 2008	Kitt Peak	Spacewatch	EOS	2.4 km	MPC · JPL
263651	2008 GU_{89}	—	April 6, 2008	Mount Lemmon	Mount Lemmon Survey	·	2.4 km	MPC · JPL
263652	2008 GT_{90}	—	April 6, 2008	Mount Lemmon	Mount Lemmon Survey	·	1.9 km	MPC · JPL
263653	2008 GT_{95}	—	April 8, 2008	Kitt Peak	Spacewatch	(5)	1.6 km	MPC · JPL
263654	2008 GR_{96}	—	April 8, 2008	Kitt Peak	Spacewatch	·	1.5 km	MPC · JPL
263655	2008 GR_{99}	—	April 9, 2008	Kitt Peak	Spacewatch	·	5.5 km	MPC · JPL
263656	2008 GS_{100}	—	April 9, 2008	Kitt Peak	Spacewatch	·	1.7 km	MPC · JPL
263657	2008 GY_{101}	—	April 10, 2008	Kitt Peak	Spacewatch	·	1.9 km	MPC · JPL
263658	2008 GD_{102}	—	April 10, 2008	Kitt Peak	Spacewatch	·	3.2 km	MPC · JPL
263659	2008 GL_{102}	—	April 10, 2008	Kitt Peak	Spacewatch	KOR	1.6 km	MPC · JPL
263660	2008 GJ_{103}	—	April 11, 2008	Kitt Peak	Spacewatch	·	3.1 km	MPC · JPL
263661	2008 GS_{103}	—	April 11, 2008	Kitt Peak	Spacewatch	EUN	1.4 km	MPC · JPL
263662	2008 GZ_{104}	—	April 11, 2008	Kitt Peak	Spacewatch	HOF	3.0 km	MPC · JPL
263663	2008 GJ_{109}	—	April 13, 2008	Mount Lemmon	Mount Lemmon Survey	URS	4.1 km	MPC · JPL
263664	2008 GW_{109}	—	April 13, 2008	Calvin-Rehoboth	Calvin College	·	3.3 km	MPC · JPL
263665	2008 GU_{110}	—	April 3, 2008	Catalina	CSS	·	6.0 km	MPC · JPL
263666	2008 GW_{112}	—	April 13, 2008	Catalina	CSS	·	3.1 km	MPC · JPL
263667	2008 GP_{113}	—	April 9, 2008	Kitt Peak	Spacewatch	·	3.1 km	MPC · JPL
263668	2008 GT_{113}	—	April 9, 2008	Kitt Peak	Spacewatch	MAS	750 m	MPC · JPL
263669	2008 GU_{113}	—	April 9, 2008	Kitt Peak	Spacewatch	·	1.5 km	MPC · JPL
263670	2008 GQ_{114}	—	April 11, 2008	Catalina	CSS	NYS	1.3 km	MPC · JPL
263671	2008 GW_{114}	—	April 11, 2008	Kitt Peak	Spacewatch	·	2.1 km	MPC · JPL
263672	2008 GO_{119}	—	April 11, 2008	Kitt Peak	Spacewatch	·	3.1 km	MPC · JPL
263673	2008 GX_{119}	—	April 12, 2008	Kitt Peak	Spacewatch	NYS	1.2 km	MPC · JPL
263674	2008 GG_{120}	—	April 12, 2008	Catalina	CSS	V	1.2 km	MPC · JPL
263675	2008 GH_{121}	—	April 13, 2008	Kitt Peak	Spacewatch	·	780 m	MPC · JPL
263676	2008 GT_{121}	—	April 13, 2008	Kitt Peak	Spacewatch	·	1.8 km	MPC · JPL
263677	2008 GF_{122}	—	April 13, 2008	Kitt Peak	Spacewatch	·	2.2 km	MPC · JPL
263678	2008 GS_{122}	—	April 13, 2008	Kitt Peak	Spacewatch	SYL · CYB	7.9 km	MPC · JPL
263679	2008 GM_{127}	—	April 14, 2008	Mount Lemmon	Mount Lemmon Survey	·	3.9 km	MPC · JPL
263680	2008 GZ_{129}	—	April 4, 2008	Mount Lemmon	Mount Lemmon Survey	·	4.1 km	MPC · JPL
263681	2008 GG_{130}	—	April 5, 2008	Catalina	CSS	·	2.6 km	MPC · JPL
263682	2008 GO_{131}	—	April 1, 2008	Kitt Peak	Spacewatch	·	2.8 km	MPC · JPL
263683	2008 GQ_{131}	—	April 3, 2008	Kitt Peak	Spacewatch	·	1.8 km	MPC · JPL
263684	2008 GS_{131}	—	April 6, 2008	Catalina	CSS	·	4.6 km	MPC · JPL
263685	2008 GC_{132}	—	April 7, 2008	Kitt Peak	Spacewatch	·	2.7 km	MPC · JPL
263686	2008 GK_{132}	—	April 13, 2008	Mount Lemmon	Mount Lemmon Survey	GEF	1.6 km	MPC · JPL
263687	2008 GN_{133}	—	April 3, 2008	Mount Lemmon	Mount Lemmon Survey	·	3.8 km	MPC · JPL
263688	2008 GQ_{133}	—	April 1, 2008	Mount Lemmon	Mount Lemmon Survey	EOS	2.0 km	MPC · JPL
263689	2008 GZ_{133}	—	April 5, 2008	Kitt Peak	Spacewatch	·	1.2 km	MPC · JPL
263690	2008 GQ_{136}	—	April 4, 2008	Kitt Peak	Spacewatch	·	1.8 km	MPC · JPL
263691	2008 GX_{137}	—	April 9, 2008	Kitt Peak	Spacewatch	·	2.3 km	MPC · JPL
263692	2008 GC_{142}	—	April 14, 2008	Mount Lemmon	Mount Lemmon Survey	ANF	2.0 km	MPC · JPL
263693	2008 GZ_{143}	—	April 1, 2008	Kitt Peak	Spacewatch	·	2.2 km	MPC · JPL
263694	2008 HN_{4}	—	April 29, 2008	La Sagra	OAM	·	2.1 km	MPC · JPL
263695	2008 HW_{6}	—	April 24, 2008	Mount Lemmon	Mount Lemmon Survey	·	1.6 km	MPC · JPL
263696	2008 HJ_{8}	—	April 24, 2008	Kitt Peak	Spacewatch	GEF	1.6 km	MPC · JPL
263697	2008 HE_{9}	—	April 24, 2008	Kitt Peak	Spacewatch	EOS	2.3 km	MPC · JPL
263698	2008 HO_{11}	—	April 24, 2008	Kitt Peak	Spacewatch	·	3.4 km	MPC · JPL
263699	2008 HV_{11}	—	April 24, 2008	Kitt Peak	Spacewatch	L5	10 km	MPC · JPL
263700	2008 HR_{13}	—	April 25, 2008	Kitt Peak	Spacewatch	·	1.4 km	MPC · JPL

== 263701–263800 ==
back to top

Designation			Discovery			Properties		Ref
Permanent	Provisional	Named after	Date	Site	Discoverer(s)	Category	Diam.	Ref
263701	2008 HF_{14}	—	April 25, 2008	Kitt Peak	Spacewatch	·	1.9 km	MPC · JPL
263702	2008 HA_{18}	—	April 26, 2008	Kitt Peak	Spacewatch	·	1.4 km	MPC · JPL
263703	2008 HX_{18}	—	April 26, 2008	Mount Lemmon	Mount Lemmon Survey	·	1.1 km	MPC · JPL
263704	2008 HZ_{25}	—	April 27, 2008	Kitt Peak	Spacewatch	EOS	2.2 km	MPC · JPL
263705	2008 HL_{26}	—	April 27, 2008	Mount Lemmon	Mount Lemmon Survey	·	3.9 km	MPC · JPL
263706	2008 HC_{29}	—	April 28, 2008	Kitt Peak	Spacewatch	HOF	2.8 km	MPC · JPL
263707	2008 HV_{30}	—	April 29, 2008	Mount Lemmon	Mount Lemmon Survey	KON	2.6 km	MPC · JPL
263708	2008 HD_{32}	—	April 29, 2008	Mount Lemmon	Mount Lemmon Survey	MRX	1.0 km	MPC · JPL
263709	2008 HX_{33}	—	April 27, 2008	Kitt Peak	Spacewatch	T_{j} (2.95) · 3:2	7.7 km	MPC · JPL
263710	2008 HZ_{33}	—	April 27, 2008	Kitt Peak	Spacewatch	·	2.4 km	MPC · JPL
263711	2008 HQ_{34}	—	April 27, 2008	Kitt Peak	Spacewatch	RAF	1.3 km	MPC · JPL
263712	2008 HC_{36}	—	April 29, 2008	Mount Lemmon	Mount Lemmon Survey	·	1.4 km	MPC · JPL
263713	2008 HK_{36}	—	April 30, 2008	Mount Lemmon	Mount Lemmon Survey	NEM	2.6 km	MPC · JPL
263714	2008 HR_{37}	—	April 30, 2008	La Sagra	OAM	·	1.4 km	MPC · JPL
263715	2008 HB_{41}	—	April 26, 2008	Mount Lemmon	Mount Lemmon Survey	·	2.2 km	MPC · JPL
263716	2008 HW_{41}	—	April 26, 2008	Mount Lemmon	Mount Lemmon Survey	·	2.8 km	MPC · JPL
263717	2008 HY_{41}	—	April 26, 2008	Mount Lemmon	Mount Lemmon Survey	·	1.4 km	MPC · JPL
263718	2008 HE_{44}	—	April 27, 2008	Mount Lemmon	Mount Lemmon Survey	·	2.6 km	MPC · JPL
263719	2008 HA_{46}	—	April 28, 2008	Kitt Peak	Spacewatch	·	3.6 km	MPC · JPL
263720	2008 HS_{47}	—	April 28, 2008	Kitt Peak	Spacewatch	·	4.7 km	MPC · JPL
263721	2008 HO_{49}	—	April 29, 2008	Mount Lemmon	Mount Lemmon Survey	·	2.7 km	MPC · JPL
263722	2008 HH_{50}	—	April 29, 2008	Kitt Peak	Spacewatch	·	3.5 km	MPC · JPL
263723	2008 HP_{50}	—	April 29, 2008	Kitt Peak	Spacewatch	MRX	1.2 km	MPC · JPL
263724	2008 HS_{50}	—	April 29, 2008	Kitt Peak	Spacewatch	SUL	2.6 km	MPC · JPL
263725	2008 HN_{51}	—	December 1, 2005	Kitt Peak	Spacewatch	·	5.3 km	MPC · JPL
263726	2008 HR_{51}	—	April 29, 2008	Kitt Peak	Spacewatch	·	2.4 km	MPC · JPL
263727	2008 HZ_{52}	—	April 29, 2008	Mount Lemmon	Mount Lemmon Survey	·	4.0 km	MPC · JPL
263728	2008 HA_{54}	—	April 29, 2008	Kitt Peak	Spacewatch	EOS	2.4 km	MPC · JPL
263729	2008 HT_{54}	—	April 29, 2008	Kitt Peak	Spacewatch	·	1.8 km	MPC · JPL
263730	2008 HQ_{56}	—	April 30, 2008	Kitt Peak	Spacewatch	·	1.8 km	MPC · JPL
263731	2008 HT_{59}	—	April 30, 2008	Mount Lemmon	Mount Lemmon Survey	KOR	1.3 km	MPC · JPL
263732	2008 HL_{60}	—	April 28, 2008	Mount Lemmon	Mount Lemmon Survey	·	3.2 km	MPC · JPL
263733	2008 HR_{66}	—	April 28, 2008	Catalina	CSS	·	3.5 km	MPC · JPL
263734	2008 HD_{69}	—	April 27, 2008	Mount Lemmon	Mount Lemmon Survey	·	2.1 km	MPC · JPL
263735	2008 JQ_{3}	—	May 1, 2008	Kitt Peak	Spacewatch	·	3.3 km	MPC · JPL
263736	2008 JT_{3}	—	May 1, 2008	Kitt Peak	Spacewatch	·	1.9 km	MPC · JPL
263737	2008 JJ_{4}	—	May 1, 2008	Kitt Peak	Spacewatch	EOS	2.6 km	MPC · JPL
263738	2008 JO_{5}	—	May 3, 2008	Mount Lemmon	Mount Lemmon Survey	·	5.3 km	MPC · JPL
263739	2008 JO_{9}	—	May 3, 2008	Kitt Peak	Spacewatch	·	4.1 km	MPC · JPL
263740	2008 JW_{14}	—	May 6, 2008	Dauban	Kugel, F.	·	3.7 km	MPC · JPL
263741	2008 JY_{14}	—	May 6, 2008	Dauban	Kugel, F.	·	1.8 km	MPC · JPL
263742	2008 JF_{18}	—	May 4, 2008	Kitt Peak	Spacewatch	·	2.2 km	MPC · JPL
263743	2008 JE_{20}	—	May 8, 2008	Kachina	Hobart, J.	·	3.3 km	MPC · JPL
263744	2008 JX_{21}	—	May 5, 2008	Mount Lemmon	Mount Lemmon Survey	EUN	1.8 km	MPC · JPL
263745	2008 JG_{22}	—	May 6, 2008	Siding Spring	SSS	·	3.3 km	MPC · JPL
263746	2008 JE_{23}	—	May 7, 2008	Kitt Peak	Spacewatch	·	3.7 km	MPC · JPL
263747	2008 JS_{25}	—	May 8, 2008	Kitt Peak	Spacewatch	·	3.9 km	MPC · JPL
263748	2008 JB_{26}	—	May 11, 2008	Catalina	CSS	·	1.7 km	MPC · JPL
263749	2008 JF_{26}	—	May 8, 2008	Socorro	LINEAR	·	1.9 km	MPC · JPL
263750	2008 JQ_{28}	—	May 8, 2008	Kitt Peak	Spacewatch	·	3.1 km	MPC · JPL
263751	2008 JT_{28}	—	May 8, 2008	Kitt Peak	Spacewatch	·	1.3 km	MPC · JPL
263752	2008 JS_{30}	—	May 11, 2008	Kitt Peak	Spacewatch	·	4.6 km	MPC · JPL
263753	2008 JM_{34}	—	May 15, 2008	Kitt Peak	Spacewatch	·	3.6 km	MPC · JPL
263754	2008 JS_{34}	—	May 15, 2008	Kitt Peak	Spacewatch	·	3.5 km	MPC · JPL
263755	2008 JC_{39}	—	May 3, 2008	Kitt Peak	Spacewatch	·	2.7 km	MPC · JPL
263756	2008 JQ_{39}	—	May 14, 2008	Mount Lemmon	Mount Lemmon Survey	EUN	1.8 km	MPC · JPL
263757	2008 KD	—	May 26, 2008	Kachina	Hobart, J.	·	3.6 km	MPC · JPL
263758	2008 KE_{5}	—	May 27, 2008	Kitt Peak	Spacewatch	·	2.6 km	MPC · JPL
263759	2008 KT_{6}	—	May 26, 2008	Mount Lemmon	Mount Lemmon Survey	·	2.2 km	MPC · JPL
263760	2008 KF_{9}	—	May 27, 2008	Kitt Peak	Spacewatch	·	2.2 km	MPC · JPL
263761	2008 KT_{9}	—	May 27, 2008	Kitt Peak	Spacewatch	·	2.3 km	MPC · JPL
263762	2008 KH_{11}	—	May 29, 2008	Mount Lemmon	Mount Lemmon Survey	·	4.0 km	MPC · JPL
263763	2008 KV_{11}	—	May 28, 2008	Calvin-Rehoboth	Calvin College	·	2.1 km	MPC · JPL
263764	2008 KE_{12}	—	May 26, 2008	Mount Lemmon	Mount Lemmon Survey	·	1.4 km	MPC · JPL
263765	2008 KQ_{14}	—	May 27, 2008	Kitt Peak	Spacewatch	TIR	4.0 km	MPC · JPL
263766	2008 KZ_{15}	—	May 27, 2008	Kitt Peak	Spacewatch	·	1.9 km	MPC · JPL
263767	2008 KP_{16}	—	May 27, 2008	Kitt Peak	Spacewatch	EOS	2.3 km	MPC · JPL
263768	2008 KR_{16}	—	May 27, 2008	Kitt Peak	Spacewatch	·	3.4 km	MPC · JPL
263769	2008 KN_{25}	—	May 29, 2008	Mount Lemmon	Mount Lemmon Survey	EUN	1.2 km	MPC · JPL
263770	2008 KP_{28}	—	May 31, 2008	Mount Lemmon	Mount Lemmon Survey	·	4.3 km	MPC · JPL
263771	2008 KY_{28}	—	May 27, 2008	Mount Lemmon	Mount Lemmon Survey	TIN	2.6 km	MPC · JPL
263772	2008 KE_{34}	—	May 30, 2008	Mount Lemmon	Mount Lemmon Survey	LIX	5.2 km	MPC · JPL
263773	2008 KW_{36}	—	May 29, 2008	Kitt Peak	Spacewatch	EOS	2.3 km	MPC · JPL
263774	2008 KS_{37}	—	May 30, 2008	Kitt Peak	Spacewatch	·	2.9 km	MPC · JPL
263775	2008 KK_{40}	—	May 29, 2008	Grove Creek	Tozzi, F.	HYG	4.0 km	MPC · JPL
263776	2008 LZ	—	June 1, 2008	Kitt Peak	Spacewatch	·	2.6 km	MPC · JPL
263777	2008 LN_{2}	—	June 1, 2008	Kitt Peak	Spacewatch	·	1.8 km	MPC · JPL
263778	2008 LP_{2}	—	June 1, 2008	Kitt Peak	Spacewatch	·	1.9 km	MPC · JPL
263779	2008 LB_{3}	—	June 1, 2008	Mount Lemmon	Mount Lemmon Survey	EOS	4.5 km	MPC · JPL
263780	2008 LN_{4}	—	June 3, 2008	Kitt Peak	Spacewatch	·	5.8 km	MPC · JPL
263781	2008 LT_{5}	—	June 3, 2008	Mount Lemmon	Mount Lemmon Survey	·	2.1 km	MPC · JPL
263782	2008 LH_{6}	—	June 3, 2008	Kitt Peak	Spacewatch	·	2.5 km	MPC · JPL
263783	2008 LE_{9}	—	June 3, 2008	Kitt Peak	Spacewatch	·	1.7 km	MPC · JPL
263784	2008 LS_{10}	—	June 6, 2008	Kitt Peak	Spacewatch	·	1.4 km	MPC · JPL
263785	2008 LB_{11}	—	June 6, 2008	Kitt Peak	Spacewatch	·	1.1 km	MPC · JPL
263786	2008 LS_{13}	—	June 7, 2008	Kitt Peak	Spacewatch	EUN	1.4 km	MPC · JPL
263787	2008 LJ_{16}	—	June 11, 2008	Kitt Peak	Spacewatch	·	4.2 km	MPC · JPL
263788	2008 MG_{4}	—	June 30, 2008	Kitt Peak	Spacewatch	·	3.1 km	MPC · JPL
263789	2008 MA_{5}	—	June 27, 2008	Cerro Burek	Burek, Cerro	·	3.7 km	MPC · JPL
263790	2008 PG_{22}	—	August 10, 2008	Črni Vrh	Skvarč, J.	(18466)	3.5 km	MPC · JPL
263791	2008 QY_{3}	—	August 23, 2008	Socorro	LINEAR	·	2.5 km	MPC · JPL
263792	2008 QX_{5}	—	August 25, 2008	La Sagra	OAM	L4	15 km	MPC · JPL
263793	2008 QE_{37}	—	August 21, 2008	Kitt Peak	Spacewatch	3:2	6.3 km	MPC · JPL
263794	2008 QQ_{37}	—	August 21, 2008	Kitt Peak	Spacewatch	L4	10 km	MPC · JPL
263795	2008 QP_{41}	—	August 21, 2008	Kitt Peak	Spacewatch	L4	8.8 km	MPC · JPL
263796	2008 QP_{42}	—	August 24, 2008	Kitt Peak	Spacewatch	L4	10 km	MPC · JPL
263797	2008 RK_{2}	—	September 2, 2008	Kitt Peak	Spacewatch	L4	10 km	MPC · JPL
263798	2008 RE_{5}	—	September 2, 2008	Kitt Peak	Spacewatch	THM	2.6 km	MPC · JPL
263799	2008 RA_{10}	—	September 3, 2008	Kitt Peak	Spacewatch	L4	10 km	MPC · JPL
263800	2008 RQ_{16}	—	September 4, 2008	Kitt Peak	Spacewatch	L4	8.3 km	MPC · JPL

== 263801–263900 ==
back to top

Designation			Discovery			Properties		Ref
Permanent	Provisional	Named after	Date	Site	Discoverer(s)	Category	Diam.	Ref
263801	2008 RU_{16}	—	September 4, 2008	Kitt Peak	Spacewatch	L4	10 km	MPC · JPL
263802	2008 RG_{19}	—	September 4, 2008	Kitt Peak	Spacewatch	L4	13 km	MPC · JPL
263803	2008 RK_{27}	—	September 8, 2008	Dauban	Kugel, F.	L4	10 km	MPC · JPL
263804	2008 RD_{31}	—	September 2, 2008	Kitt Peak	Spacewatch	L4	13 km	MPC · JPL
263805	2008 RP_{31}	—	September 2, 2008	Kitt Peak	Spacewatch	L4	9.2 km	MPC · JPL
263806	2008 RW_{37}	—	April 25, 2003	Kitt Peak	Spacewatch	L4	10 km	MPC · JPL
263807	2008 RJ_{45}	—	September 2, 2008	Kitt Peak	Spacewatch	L4	8.5 km	MPC · JPL
263808	2008 RQ_{54}	—	September 3, 2008	Kitt Peak	Spacewatch	L4	8.7 km	MPC · JPL
263809	2008 RU_{55}	—	September 3, 2008	Kitt Peak	Spacewatch	L4	10 km	MPC · JPL
263810	2008 RD_{56}	—	September 3, 2008	Kitt Peak	Spacewatch	L4	8.7 km	MPC · JPL
263811	2008 RV_{99}	—	September 2, 2008	Kitt Peak	Spacewatch	L4	7.9 km	MPC · JPL
263812	2008 RW_{121}	—	September 3, 2008	Kitt Peak	Spacewatch	L4	8.2 km	MPC · JPL
263813	2008 RD_{122}	—	September 3, 2008	Kitt Peak	Spacewatch	3:2	5.3 km	MPC · JPL
263814	2008 RS_{122}	—	September 4, 2008	Kitt Peak	Spacewatch	L4	16 km	MPC · JPL
263815	2008 RH_{125}	—	September 7, 2008	Mount Lemmon	Mount Lemmon Survey	L4	9.8 km	MPC · JPL
263816	2008 RV_{125}	—	September 9, 2008	Mount Lemmon	Mount Lemmon Survey	L4	13 km	MPC · JPL
263817	2008 RJ_{126}	—	September 2, 2008	Kitt Peak	Spacewatch	L4	8.5 km	MPC · JPL
263818	2008 RX_{126}	—	September 5, 2008	Kitt Peak	Spacewatch	L4	10 km	MPC · JPL
263819	2008 RR_{128}	—	September 10, 2008	Kitt Peak	Spacewatch	L4	9.9 km	MPC · JPL
263820	2008 RF_{140}	—	September 8, 2008	Bergisch Gladbach	W. Bickel	·	4.9 km	MPC · JPL
263821	2008 SX_{41}	—	September 20, 2008	Mount Lemmon	Mount Lemmon Survey	L4	9.0 km	MPC · JPL
263822	2008 SO_{49}	—	September 20, 2008	Mount Lemmon	Mount Lemmon Survey	L4 · (222861)	13 km	MPC · JPL
263823	2008 SD_{78}	—	September 23, 2008	Mount Lemmon	Mount Lemmon Survey	L4	9.4 km	MPC · JPL
263824	2008 SP_{155}	—	September 23, 2008	Socorro	LINEAR	EOS	5.0 km	MPC · JPL
263825	2008 SM_{172}	—	September 22, 2008	Mount Lemmon	Mount Lemmon Survey	L4	20 km	MPC · JPL
263826	2008 SA_{180}	—	September 24, 2008	Kitt Peak	Spacewatch	L4	10 km	MPC · JPL
263827	2008 SR_{190}	—	September 25, 2008	Mount Lemmon	Mount Lemmon Survey	L4	10 km	MPC · JPL
263828	2008 SG_{191}	—	September 25, 2008	Mount Lemmon	Mount Lemmon Survey	L4	13 km	MPC · JPL
263829	2008 SL_{222}	—	September 25, 2008	Mount Lemmon	Mount Lemmon Survey	L4 · ERY	9.0 km	MPC · JPL
263830	2008 SK_{227}	—	September 28, 2008	Mount Lemmon	Mount Lemmon Survey	L4	10 km	MPC · JPL
263831	2008 SR_{254}	—	September 22, 2008	Catalina	CSS	L4	12 km	MPC · JPL
263832	2008 SU_{279}	—	September 24, 2008	Mount Lemmon	Mount Lemmon Survey	L4	8.8 km	MPC · JPL
263833	2008 TJ_{53}	—	October 2, 2008	Mount Lemmon	Mount Lemmon Survey	L4 · ERY	10 km	MPC · JPL
263834	2008 TS_{54}	—	October 2, 2008	Kitt Peak	Spacewatch	L4	8.3 km	MPC · JPL
263835	2008 TA_{62}	—	October 2, 2008	Catalina	CSS	·	3.7 km	MPC · JPL
263836	2008 TU_{100}	—	October 6, 2008	Kitt Peak	Spacewatch	L4	10 km	MPC · JPL
263837	2008 TJ_{130}	—	October 8, 2008	Mount Lemmon	Mount Lemmon Survey	L4	8.2 km	MPC · JPL
263838	2008 US_{21}	—	October 19, 2008	Kitt Peak	Spacewatch	·	5.4 km	MPC · JPL
263839	2008 WM_{2}	—	November 20, 2008	Catalina	CSS	H	730 m	MPC · JPL
263840	2008 WG_{61}	—	November 24, 2008	Kitt Peak	Spacewatch	L4	20 km	MPC · JPL
263841	2008 XM_{30}	—	December 1, 2008	Kitt Peak	Spacewatch	·	3.6 km	MPC · JPL
263842	2008 YS_{158}	—	December 30, 2008	Mount Lemmon	Mount Lemmon Survey	·	1.8 km	MPC · JPL
263843	2008 YT_{160}	—	December 31, 2008	Kitt Peak	Spacewatch	·	2.8 km	MPC · JPL
263844 Johnfarrell	2009 BV_{7}	Johnfarrell	January 21, 2009	Kachina	Hobart, J.	·	3.3 km	MPC · JPL
263845	2009 BM_{10}	—	January 21, 2009	Socorro	LINEAR	H	780 m	MPC · JPL
263846	2009 BP_{13}	—	January 25, 2009	Socorro	LINEAR	H	680 m	MPC · JPL
263847	2009 BS_{30}	—	January 16, 2009	Kitt Peak	Spacewatch	·	710 m	MPC · JPL
263848	2009 BF_{44}	—	January 16, 2009	Kitt Peak	Spacewatch	MAS	980 m	MPC · JPL
263849	2009 BL_{83}	—	January 31, 2009	Uccle	T. Pauwels, E. W. Elst	·	1.8 km	MPC · JPL
263850	2009 BO_{84}	—	January 25, 2009	Kitt Peak	Spacewatch	·	740 m	MPC · JPL
263851	2009 BT_{112}	—	January 31, 2009	Mount Lemmon	Mount Lemmon Survey	NYS	1.5 km	MPC · JPL
263852	2009 BV_{121}	—	January 31, 2009	Kitt Peak	Spacewatch	·	1.2 km	MPC · JPL
263853	2009 BC_{124}	—	January 31, 2009	Kitt Peak	Spacewatch	·	1.0 km	MPC · JPL
263854	2009 BP_{126}	—	January 29, 2009	Kitt Peak	Spacewatch	·	1.3 km	MPC · JPL
263855	2009 BS_{145}	—	January 30, 2009	Kitt Peak	Spacewatch	·	690 m	MPC · JPL
263856	2009 BX_{146}	—	January 30, 2009	Mount Lemmon	Mount Lemmon Survey	·	1.4 km	MPC · JPL
263857	2009 BF_{149}	—	January 31, 2009	Kitt Peak	Spacewatch	·	1.2 km	MPC · JPL
263858	2009 BJ_{171}	—	January 17, 2009	Kitt Peak	Spacewatch	·	1.7 km	MPC · JPL
263859	2009 BX_{178}	—	January 30, 2009	Mount Lemmon	Mount Lemmon Survey	NYS	1.4 km	MPC · JPL
263860	2009 CD_{11}	—	February 1, 2009	Mount Lemmon	Mount Lemmon Survey	·	1.0 km	MPC · JPL
263861	2009 CN_{30}	—	February 1, 2009	Kitt Peak	Spacewatch	PHO	2.3 km	MPC · JPL
263862	2009 DQ_{2}	—	February 17, 2009	Dauban	Kugel, F.	·	1.8 km	MPC · JPL
263863	2009 DV_{3}	—	February 18, 2009	Socorro	LINEAR	·	2.7 km	MPC · JPL
263864	2009 DD_{16}	—	February 17, 2009	La Sagra	OAM	·	870 m	MPC · JPL
263865	2009 DY_{23}	—	February 20, 2009	Catalina	CSS	·	1.9 km	MPC · JPL
263866	2009 DF_{33}	—	February 20, 2009	Kitt Peak	Spacewatch	·	1.4 km	MPC · JPL
263867	2009 DN_{33}	—	February 20, 2009	Kitt Peak	Spacewatch	HYG	4.5 km	MPC · JPL
263868	2009 DN_{40}	—	February 16, 2009	Catalina	CSS	H	590 m	MPC · JPL
263869	2009 DY_{41}	—	February 19, 2009	La Sagra	OAM	V	780 m	MPC · JPL
263870	2009 DE_{45}	—	February 21, 2009	Socorro	LINEAR	PHO	2.2 km	MPC · JPL
263871	2009 DP_{47}	—	February 28, 2009	Socorro	LINEAR	·	2.4 km	MPC · JPL
263872	2009 DA_{50}	—	February 19, 2009	Kitt Peak	Spacewatch	·	790 m	MPC · JPL
263873	2009 DT_{75}	—	February 21, 2009	Mount Lemmon	Mount Lemmon Survey	·	1.2 km	MPC · JPL
263874	2009 DQ_{96}	—	February 24, 2009	Kitt Peak	Spacewatch	·	2.2 km	MPC · JPL
263875	2009 DD_{105}	—	February 26, 2009	Kitt Peak	Spacewatch	ADE	3.4 km	MPC · JPL
263876	2009 DB_{125}	—	February 19, 2009	Kitt Peak	Spacewatch	·	1.3 km	MPC · JPL
263877	2009 DO_{125}	—	February 19, 2009	Kitt Peak	Spacewatch	·	750 m	MPC · JPL
263878	2009 DX_{138}	—	February 22, 2009	Siding Spring	SSS	·	3.2 km	MPC · JPL
263879	2009 DG_{139}	—	February 27, 2009	Kitt Peak	Spacewatch	MAS	840 m	MPC · JPL
263880	2009 EW_{5}	—	March 1, 2009	Kitt Peak	Spacewatch	·	730 m	MPC · JPL
263881	2009 ES_{10}	—	March 1, 2009	Kitt Peak	Spacewatch	V	860 m	MPC · JPL
263882	2009 EW_{20}	—	March 15, 2009	Kitt Peak	Spacewatch	·	1.6 km	MPC · JPL
263883	2009 EJ_{23}	—	March 8, 2009	Mount Lemmon	Mount Lemmon Survey	·	1.4 km	MPC · JPL
263884	2009 EC_{26}	—	March 8, 2009	Mount Lemmon	Mount Lemmon Survey	·	680 m	MPC · JPL
263885	2009 EZ_{26}	—	March 15, 2009	Kitt Peak	Spacewatch	·	1.2 km	MPC · JPL
263886	2009 EU_{27}	—	March 2, 2009	Kitt Peak	Spacewatch	·	2.3 km	MPC · JPL
263887	2009 FU	—	March 16, 2009	La Sagra	OAM	·	1.4 km	MPC · JPL
263888	2009 FT_{1}	—	March 17, 2009	La Sagra	OAM	·	5.2 km	MPC · JPL
263889	2009 FB_{3}	—	March 17, 2009	Mayhill	Lowe, A.	·	2.9 km	MPC · JPL
263890	2009 FX_{13}	—	March 16, 2009	Dauban	Kugel, F.	·	1.8 km	MPC · JPL
263891	2009 FY_{13}	—	March 17, 2009	Dauban	Kugel, F.	·	2.0 km	MPC · JPL
263892	2009 FZ_{13}	—	March 17, 2009	Dauban	Kugel, F.	·	1.3 km	MPC · JPL
263893	2009 FD_{14}	—	March 18, 2009	La Sagra	OAM	·	1.5 km	MPC · JPL
263894	2009 FF_{17}	—	March 16, 2009	La Sagra	OAM	EUN	1.4 km	MPC · JPL
263895	2009 FK_{18}	—	March 19, 2009	La Sagra	OAM	·	1.7 km	MPC · JPL
263896	2009 FU_{18}	—	March 20, 2009	La Sagra	OAM	·	1.5 km	MPC · JPL
263897	2009 FO_{19}	—	March 21, 2009	Dauban	Kugel, F.	·	1.3 km	MPC · JPL
263898	2009 FM_{21}	—	March 19, 2009	Socorro	LINEAR	·	940 m	MPC · JPL
263899	2009 FR_{22}	—	March 19, 2009	Kitt Peak	Spacewatch	·	2.8 km	MPC · JPL
263900	2009 FY_{23}	—	March 16, 2009	La Sagra	OAM	·	1.8 km	MPC · JPL

== 263901–264000 ==
back to top

Designation			Discovery			Properties		Ref
Permanent	Provisional	Named after	Date	Site	Discoverer(s)	Category	Diam.	Ref
263901	2009 FF_{25}	—	March 23, 2009	La Sagra	OAM	·	2.7 km	MPC · JPL
263902	2009 FS_{34}	—	March 24, 2009	Mount Lemmon	Mount Lemmon Survey	·	1.0 km	MPC · JPL
263903	2009 FQ_{35}	—	March 22, 2009	Mount Lemmon	Mount Lemmon Survey	·	1.1 km	MPC · JPL
263904	2009 FA_{37}	—	March 23, 2009	Purple Mountain	PMO NEO Survey Program	·	2.1 km	MPC · JPL
263905	2009 FC_{38}	—	March 25, 2009	Mount Lemmon	Mount Lemmon Survey	·	710 m	MPC · JPL
263906 Yuanfengfang	2009 FS_{44}	Yuanfengfang	March 21, 2009	Lulin	Jin, Z.-W., Lin, C.-S.	·	900 m	MPC · JPL
263907	2009 FP_{46}	—	March 27, 2009	Kitt Peak	Spacewatch	·	1 km	MPC · JPL
263908	2009 FV_{46}	—	March 27, 2009	Kitt Peak	Spacewatch	·	1.0 km	MPC · JPL
263909	2009 FC_{48}	—	March 30, 2009	Hibiscus	Teamo, N.	·	2.2 km	MPC · JPL
263910	2009 FZ_{51}	—	March 28, 2009	Mount Lemmon	Mount Lemmon Survey	ADE	2.2 km	MPC · JPL
263911	2009 FS_{61}	—	March 17, 2009	Kitt Peak	Spacewatch	·	2.8 km	MPC · JPL
263912	2009 FA_{64}	—	March 29, 2009	Kitt Peak	Spacewatch	·	1.5 km	MPC · JPL
263913	2009 FL_{64}	—	March 31, 2009	Mount Lemmon	Mount Lemmon Survey	·	1.4 km	MPC · JPL
263914	2009 FZ_{65}	—	March 19, 2009	Kitt Peak	Spacewatch	·	2.4 km	MPC · JPL
263915	2009 FU_{66}	—	March 24, 2009	Kitt Peak	Spacewatch	·	1.5 km	MPC · JPL
263916	2009 FW_{67}	—	March 24, 2009	Kitt Peak	Spacewatch	·	1.1 km	MPC · JPL
263917	2009 FL_{69}	—	March 17, 2009	Kitt Peak	Spacewatch	·	1.4 km	MPC · JPL
263918	2009 FV_{69}	—	March 18, 2009	Kitt Peak	Spacewatch	·	1.4 km	MPC · JPL
263919	2009 FL_{72}	—	March 18, 2009	Catalina	CSS	·	1.2 km	MPC · JPL
263920	2009 FH_{75}	—	March 18, 2009	Kitt Peak	Spacewatch	(5)	1.6 km	MPC · JPL
263921	2009 GN_{3}	—	April 15, 2009	Socorro	LINEAR	·	5.0 km	MPC · JPL
263922	2009 HQ	—	April 16, 2009	Catalina	CSS	NYS	1.4 km	MPC · JPL
263923	2009 HR_{1}	—	April 17, 2009	Catalina	CSS	·	850 m	MPC · JPL
263924	2009 HT_{5}	—	April 17, 2009	Kitt Peak	Spacewatch	·	1.1 km	MPC · JPL
263925	2009 HW_{18}	—	April 19, 2009	Kitt Peak	Spacewatch	·	2.0 km	MPC · JPL
263926	2009 HE_{20}	—	April 17, 2009	Catalina	CSS	·	2.7 km	MPC · JPL
263927	2009 HD_{28}	—	April 18, 2009	Kitt Peak	Spacewatch	NYS	1.0 km	MPC · JPL
263928	2009 HP_{36}	—	April 20, 2009	La Sagra	OAM	·	3.1 km	MPC · JPL
263929	2009 HK_{37}	—	April 17, 2009	Catalina	CSS	·	2.5 km	MPC · JPL
263930	2009 HA_{42}	—	April 20, 2009	Kitt Peak	Spacewatch	·	3.8 km	MPC · JPL
263931	2009 HO_{42}	—	April 20, 2009	Kitt Peak	Spacewatch	·	2.3 km	MPC · JPL
263932 Speyer	2009 HY_{44}	Speyer	April 22, 2009	Tzec Maun	E. Schwab	JUN	1.1 km	MPC · JPL
263933	2009 HM_{45}	—	April 21, 2009	La Sagra	OAM	·	890 m	MPC · JPL
263934	2009 HF_{48}	—	April 19, 2009	Kitt Peak	Spacewatch	·	2.0 km	MPC · JPL
263935	2009 HG_{53}	—	April 19, 2009	Mount Lemmon	Mount Lemmon Survey	·	750 m	MPC · JPL
263936	2009 HW_{53}	—	April 20, 2009	Kitt Peak	Spacewatch	·	3.3 km	MPC · JPL
263937	2009 HP_{54}	—	April 20, 2009	Kitt Peak	Spacewatch	·	830 m	MPC · JPL
263938	2009 HR_{54}	—	April 20, 2009	Kitt Peak	Spacewatch	V	740 m	MPC · JPL
263939	2009 HR_{57}	—	April 23, 2009	Marly	P. Kocher	·	2.0 km	MPC · JPL
263940 Malyshkina	2009 HN_{58}	Malyshkina	April 20, 2009	Zelenchukskaya Stn	T. V. Krjačko	·	960 m	MPC · JPL
263941	2009 HK_{65}	—	April 23, 2009	Kitt Peak	Spacewatch	·	2.5 km	MPC · JPL
263942	2009 HZ_{69}	—	April 22, 2009	Mount Lemmon	Mount Lemmon Survey	AGN	1.1 km	MPC · JPL
263943	2009 HY_{74}	—	April 27, 2009	Mount Lemmon	Mount Lemmon Survey	·	2.0 km	MPC · JPL
263944	2009 HD_{80}	—	April 28, 2009	Catalina	CSS	·	990 m	MPC · JPL
263945	2009 HK_{80}	—	April 28, 2009	Catalina	CSS	·	2.3 km	MPC · JPL
263946	2009 HZ_{86}	—	April 30, 2009	Mount Lemmon	Mount Lemmon Survey	·	2.0 km	MPC · JPL
263947	2009 HL_{88}	—	April 24, 2009	La Sagra	OAM	·	2.5 km	MPC · JPL
263948	2009 HV_{88}	—	April 23, 2009	La Sagra	OAM	·	1.8 km	MPC · JPL
263949	2009 HQ_{89}	—	April 30, 2009	La Sagra	OAM	·	3.5 km	MPC · JPL
263950	2009 HB_{94}	—	April 28, 2009	Cerro Burek	Burek, Cerro	·	3.2 km	MPC · JPL
263951	2009 HJ_{94}	—	April 27, 2009	Moletai	K. Černis, Zdanavicius, J.	·	2.5 km	MPC · JPL
263952	2009 HA_{102}	—	April 19, 2009	Kitt Peak	Spacewatch	·	2.2 km	MPC · JPL
263953	2009 HB_{102}	—	April 19, 2009	Kitt Peak	Spacewatch	·	2.8 km	MPC · JPL
263954	2009 HD_{102}	—	April 20, 2009	Kitt Peak	Spacewatch	·	1.6 km	MPC · JPL
263955	2009 HO_{102}	—	April 23, 2009	Kitt Peak	Spacewatch	·	2.8 km	MPC · JPL
263956	2009 HG_{103}	—	April 18, 2009	Kitt Peak	Spacewatch	·	2.0 km	MPC · JPL
263957	2009 HK_{103}	—	April 18, 2009	Mount Lemmon	Mount Lemmon Survey	EOS	2.6 km	MPC · JPL
263958	2009 HU_{104}	—	April 19, 2009	Kitt Peak	Spacewatch	·	1.3 km	MPC · JPL
263959	2009 JJ	—	May 2, 2009	La Sagra	OAM	·	4.1 km	MPC · JPL
263960	2009 JO	—	May 3, 2009	La Sagra	OAM	·	4.0 km	MPC · JPL
263961	2009 JR_{1}	—	May 2, 2009	Purple Mountain	PMO NEO Survey Program	·	1.5 km	MPC · JPL
263962	2009 JA_{4}	—	May 13, 2009	Kitt Peak	Spacewatch	TEL	1.8 km	MPC · JPL
263963	2009 JL_{4}	—	May 1, 2009	Cerro Burek	Burek, Cerro	·	1.7 km	MPC · JPL
263964	2009 JU_{6}	—	May 13, 2009	Mount Lemmon	Mount Lemmon Survey	·	1.4 km	MPC · JPL
263965	2009 JP_{7}	—	May 13, 2009	Kitt Peak	Spacewatch	·	810 m	MPC · JPL
263966	2009 JK_{8}	—	May 13, 2009	Kitt Peak	Spacewatch	WIT	1.3 km	MPC · JPL
263967	2009 JU_{8}	—	May 13, 2009	Kitt Peak	Spacewatch	·	1.9 km	MPC · JPL
263968	2009 JF_{12}	—	May 15, 2009	Kitt Peak	Spacewatch	·	3.9 km	MPC · JPL
263969	2009 JD_{13}	—	May 2, 2009	La Sagra	OAM	·	3.4 km	MPC · JPL
263970	2009 JQ_{17}	—	May 1, 2009	Mount Lemmon	Mount Lemmon Survey	·	1.8 km	MPC · JPL
263971	2009 KB_{1}	—	May 17, 2009	Dauban	Kugel, F.	·	3.8 km	MPC · JPL
263972	2009 KC_{1}	—	May 17, 2009	Dauban	Kugel, F.	·	3.3 km	MPC · JPL
263973	2009 KL_{1}	—	May 18, 2009	La Sagra	OAM	·	5.4 km	MPC · JPL
263974	2009 KG_{2}	—	May 19, 2009	La Sagra	OAM	·	1.7 km	MPC · JPL
263975	2009 KY_{2}	—	May 24, 2009	Skylive	Tozzi, F.	H	800 m	MPC · JPL
263976	2009 KD_{5}	—	May 26, 2009	La Sagra	OAM	APO · PHA	780 m	MPC · JPL
263977	2009 KH_{7}	—	May 26, 2009	La Sagra	OAM	·	1.2 km	MPC · JPL
263978	2009 KY_{7}	—	May 18, 2009	La Sagra	OAM	·	1.2 km	MPC · JPL
263979	2009 KE_{8}	—	May 28, 2009	La Sagra	OAM	·	4.6 km	MPC · JPL
263980	2009 KV_{10}	—	May 25, 2009	Kitt Peak	Spacewatch	·	3.0 km	MPC · JPL
263981	2009 KX_{16}	—	May 26, 2009	Kitt Peak	Spacewatch	ERI	2.4 km	MPC · JPL
263982	2009 KR_{17}	—	May 26, 2009	Kitt Peak	Spacewatch	EOS	4.6 km	MPC · JPL
263983	2009 KD_{22}	—	May 17, 2009	Mount Lemmon	Mount Lemmon Survey	·	860 m	MPC · JPL
263984	2009 KP_{22}	—	May 16, 2009	Mount Lemmon	Mount Lemmon Survey	·	1.0 km	MPC · JPL
263985	2009 KX_{22}	—	May 26, 2009	Catalina	CSS	·	2.0 km	MPC · JPL
263986	2009 KO_{25}	—	May 28, 2009	Mount Lemmon	Mount Lemmon Survey	·	3.2 km	MPC · JPL
263987	2009 KR_{28}	—	May 30, 2009	Mount Lemmon	Mount Lemmon Survey	·	2.5 km	MPC · JPL
263988	2009 LJ_{1}	—	June 12, 2009	Kitt Peak	Spacewatch	·	1.4 km	MPC · JPL
263989	2009 LP_{1}	—	June 12, 2009	Bergisch Gladbach	W. Bickel	·	2.6 km	MPC · JPL
263990	2009 LX_{4}	—	June 14, 2009	Kitt Peak	Spacewatch	VER	3.6 km	MPC · JPL
263991	2009 MZ	—	June 21, 2009	Skylive	Tozzi, F.	·	7.9 km	MPC · JPL
263992	2009 ME_{5}	—	June 21, 2009	Kitt Peak	Spacewatch	·	2.4 km	MPC · JPL
263993	2009 MT_{8}	—	June 27, 2009	La Sagra	OAM	·	6.1 km	MPC · JPL
263994	2009 MJ_{9}	—	June 23, 2009	Mount Lemmon	Mount Lemmon Survey	·	2.1 km	MPC · JPL
263995	2009 MV_{9}	—	June 23, 2009	Mount Lemmon	Mount Lemmon Survey	·	3.6 km	MPC · JPL
263996	2009 NW	—	July 15, 2009	La Sagra	OAM	·	3.0 km	MPC · JPL
263997	2009 OK_{2}	—	July 18, 2009	La Sagra	OAM	·	860 m	MPC · JPL
263998	2009 OZ_{3}	—	July 17, 2009	La Sagra	OAM	·	4.5 km	MPC · JPL
263999	2009 OL_{4}	—	July 19, 2009	La Sagra	OAM	·	4.1 km	MPC · JPL
264000	2009 OB_{6}	—	July 19, 2009	La Sagra	OAM	·	1.7 km	MPC · JPL

back to top

== See also ==
- Meanings of minor-planet names: 263001–264000
