= Meanings of minor-planet names: 266001–267000 =

As minor planet discoveries are confirmed, they are given a permanent number by the IAU's Minor Planet Center (MPC), and the discoverers can then submit names for them, following the IAU's naming conventions. The list below concerns those minor planets in the specified number-range that have received names, and explains the meanings of those names.

Official naming citations of newly named small Solar System bodies are approved and published in a bulletin by IAU's Working Group for Small Bodies Nomenclature (WGSBN). Before May 2021, citations were published in MPC's Minor Planet Circulars for many decades. Recent citations can also be found on the JPL Small-Body Database (SBDB). Until his death in 2016, German astronomer Lutz D. Schmadel compiled these citations into the Dictionary of Minor Planet Names (DMP) and regularly updated the collection.

Based on Paul Herget's The Names of the Minor Planets, Schmadel also researched the unclear origin of numerous asteroids, most of which had been named prior to World War II. This article incorporates text from this source, which is in the public domain: SBDB New namings may only be added to this list below after official publication as the preannouncement of names is condemned. The WGSBN publishes a comprehensive guideline for the naming rules of non-cometary small Solar System bodies.

== 266001–266100 ==
Named minor planet	Provisional	This minor planet was named for...	Ref · Catalog
266051 Hannawieser	2006 NB	Hanna Wieser (born 1957), a Swiss violinist	JPL · 266051
266081 Villyket	2006 RP_{109}	Violet R. Ket (born 1985), a Bulgarian-American writer, director, and producer, and wife of the discoverer Joseph Masiero	JPL · 266081

== 266101–266200 ==
back to top

Named minor planet	Provisional	This minor planet was named for...	Ref · Catalog
There are no named minor planets in this number range

== 266201–266300 ==
back to top

Named minor planet	Provisional	This minor planet was named for...	Ref · Catalog
266286 Bodenmüller	2007 BQ_{19}	Wolfgang Bodenmüller (b. 1951), a German amateur astronomer and astrophotographer.	IAU · 266286

== 266301–266400 ==
back to top

Named minor planet	Provisional	This minor planet was named for...	Ref · Catalog
There are no named minor planets in this number range

== 266401–266500 ==
back to top

Named minor planet	Provisional	This minor planet was named for...	Ref · Catalog
266465 Andalucia	2007 OH	Andalucia (Andalusia) is an autonomous Spanish community with the largest number of inhabitants spread out over 80 000 km². The community is key to the history of southern Europe, and its ports were essential to the discovery and exploration of America.	JPL · 266465

== 266501–266600 ==
back to top

Named minor planet	Provisional	This minor planet was named for...	Ref · Catalog
There are no named minor planets in this number range

== 266601–266700 ==
back to top

Named minor planet	Provisional	This minor planet was named for...	Ref · Catalog
266622 Málna	2008 QO_{3}	Szofia Málna Sárneczky (born 2010), the daughter of Hungarian discoverer Krisztián Sárneczky	JPL · 266622
266646 Zaphod	2008 SD_{209}	Zaphod Beeblebrox, a fictional character in The Hitchhiker's Guide to the Galaxy by Douglas Adams	JPL · 266646

== 266701–266800 ==
back to top

Named minor planet	Provisional	This minor planet was named for...	Ref · Catalog
266710 Pedrettiadriana	2009 QH_{37}	mother of astronomer Marco Micheli	JPL · 266710
266711 Tuttlingen	2009 QX_{38}	Tuttlingen, a city in Baden-Württemberg, Germany	JPL · 266711
266725 Vonputtkamer	2009 RU_{26}	Jesco von Puttkamer (1933–2012), a German-born aerospace engineer and senior NASA manager	JPL · 266725

== 266801–266900 ==
back to top

Named minor planet	Provisional	This minor planet was named for...	Ref · Catalog
266854 Sezenaksu	2009 UB_{90}	Sezen Aksu (born 1954), a Turkish pop music singer, songwriter and producer	JPL · 266854
266887 Wolfgangries	2009 WO_{24}	Wolfgang Ries (born 1968), an Austrian amateur astronomer and astrophotographer	JPL · 266887

== 266901–267000 ==
back to top

Named minor planet	Provisional	This minor planet was named for...	Ref · Catalog
266921 Culhane	2010 CN_{52}	William Culhane (born 1930) is a retired mechanic and grandfather of one of the members of the discovering WISE-team.	JPL · 266921
266983 Josepbosch	2010 WE_{66}	Josep Bosch (born 1983), son of Josep Maria Bosch, a principal observer and discoverer of minor planets at the Santa Maria de Montmagastrell Observatory (B74) in Catalonia, Spain	JPL · 266983

back to top

Preceded by 265,001–266,000	Meanings of minor-planet names List of minor planets: 266,001–267,000	Succeeded by 267,001–268,000
