= List of minor planets: 266001–267000 =

The following is a partial list of minor planets, running from minor-planet number 266001 through 267000, inclusive. The primary data for this and other partial lists is based on JPL's "Small-Body Orbital Elements" and data available from the Minor Planet Center. Critical list information is also provided by the MPC, unless otherwise specified from Lowell Observatory. A detailed description of the table's columns and additional sources are given on the main page including a complete list of every page in this series, and a statistical break-up on the dynamical classification of minor planets.

Also see the summary list of all named bodies in numerical and alphabetical order, and the corresponding naming citations for the number range of this particular list. New namings may only be added to this list after official publication, as the preannouncement of names is condemned by the Working Group for Small Bodies Nomenclature of the International Astronomical Union.

Near-Earth obj.	MBA (inner)	MBA (outer)	Centaur
Mars-crosser	MBA (middle)	Jupiter trojan	Trans-Neptunian obj.
Unclassified

== 266001–266100 ==
Designation			Discovery			Properties		Ref
Permanent	Provisional	Named after	Date	Site	Discoverer(s)	Category	Diam.	Ref
266001	2006 DC_{136}	—	February 25, 2006	Kitt Peak	Spacewatch	KOR	2.1 km	MPC · JPL
266002	2006 DW_{161}	—	February 27, 2006	Mount Lemmon	Mount Lemmon Survey	·	2.9 km	MPC · JPL
266003	2006 DJ_{188}	—	February 27, 2006	Kitt Peak	Spacewatch	·	2.8 km	MPC · JPL
266004	2006 DJ_{195}	—	February 28, 2006	Socorro	LINEAR	·	4.9 km	MPC · JPL
266005	2006 DN_{196}	—	February 23, 2006	Anderson Mesa	LONEOS	·	3.9 km	MPC · JPL
266006	2006 DU_{201}	—	February 20, 2006	Socorro	LINEAR	·	5.0 km	MPC · JPL
266007	2006 EX_{4}	—	March 2, 2006	Kitt Peak	Spacewatch	·	3.5 km	MPC · JPL
266008	2006 EU_{14}	—	March 2, 2006	Kitt Peak	Spacewatch	THM	2.5 km	MPC · JPL
266009	2006 EH_{24}	—	March 3, 2006	Kitt Peak	Spacewatch	·	1.5 km	MPC · JPL
266010	2006 EW_{33}	—	March 3, 2006	Mount Lemmon	Mount Lemmon Survey	·	4.0 km	MPC · JPL
266011	2006 EU_{34}	—	March 3, 2006	Kitt Peak	Spacewatch	·	2.9 km	MPC · JPL
266012	2006 EZ_{35}	—	March 3, 2006	Mount Lemmon	Mount Lemmon Survey	·	2.4 km	MPC · JPL
266013	2006 EN_{36}	—	March 3, 2006	Mount Lemmon	Mount Lemmon Survey	·	2.7 km	MPC · JPL
266014	2006 EB_{39}	—	March 4, 2006	Catalina	CSS	·	5.8 km	MPC · JPL
266015	2006 EC_{42}	—	March 4, 2006	Kitt Peak	Spacewatch	ANF	2.2 km	MPC · JPL
266016	2006 EW_{46}	—	March 4, 2006	Kitt Peak	Spacewatch	·	4.1 km	MPC · JPL
266017	2006 EQ_{55}	—	March 5, 2006	Kitt Peak	Spacewatch	·	4.4 km	MPC · JPL
266018	2006 EW_{59}	—	March 5, 2006	Kitt Peak	Spacewatch	·	3.6 km	MPC · JPL
266019	2006 EV_{70}	—	March 9, 2006	Catalina	CSS	·	6.6 km	MPC · JPL
266020	2006 ER_{71}	—	March 2, 2006	Kitt Peak	Spacewatch	THM	2.3 km	MPC · JPL
266021	2006 FZ_{10}	—	March 23, 2006	Kitt Peak	Spacewatch	·	2.8 km	MPC · JPL
266022	2006 FM_{11}	—	March 23, 2006	Kitt Peak	Spacewatch	·	3.9 km	MPC · JPL
266023	2006 FG_{35}	—	March 23, 2006	Socorro	LINEAR	·	4.5 km	MPC · JPL
266024	2006 FF_{38}	—	March 23, 2006	Kitt Peak	Spacewatch	THM	3.2 km	MPC · JPL
266025	2006 FX_{45}	—	March 25, 2006	Catalina	CSS	·	5.4 km	MPC · JPL
266026	2006 FA_{48}	—	March 24, 2006	Anderson Mesa	LONEOS	·	4.6 km	MPC · JPL
266027	2006 FC_{48}	—	March 24, 2006	Anderson Mesa	LONEOS	HYG	4.1 km	MPC · JPL
266028	2006 FQ_{49}	—	March 25, 2006	Catalina	CSS	TIR	4.5 km	MPC · JPL
266029	2006 FA_{51}	—	March 24, 2006	Catalina	CSS	·	3.6 km	MPC · JPL
266030	2006 GL_{25}	—	April 2, 2006	Kitt Peak	Spacewatch	THM	2.5 km	MPC · JPL
266031	2006 GL_{39}	—	April 7, 2006	Anderson Mesa	LONEOS	THB	4.2 km	MPC · JPL
266032	2006 GT_{39}	—	April 2, 2006	Catalina	CSS	·	7.3 km	MPC · JPL
266033	2006 GW_{42}	—	April 9, 2006	Anderson Mesa	LONEOS	·	4.2 km	MPC · JPL
266034	2006 GY_{44}	—	April 7, 2006	Mount Lemmon	Mount Lemmon Survey	THM	2.5 km	MPC · JPL
266035	2006 GJ_{53}	—	April 6, 2006	Catalina	CSS	·	3.9 km	MPC · JPL
266036	2006 HY_{12}	—	April 19, 2006	Kitt Peak	Spacewatch	·	4.8 km	MPC · JPL
266037	2006 HW_{18}	—	April 18, 2006	Kitt Peak	Spacewatch	·	2.6 km	MPC · JPL
266038	2006 HC_{19}	—	April 18, 2006	Kitt Peak	Spacewatch	·	3.8 km	MPC · JPL
266039	2006 HR_{56}	—	April 19, 2006	Catalina	CSS	LIX	4.6 km	MPC · JPL
266040	2006 HM_{69}	—	April 24, 2006	Mount Lemmon	Mount Lemmon Survey	MAS	800 m	MPC · JPL
266041	2006 HD_{109}	—	April 30, 2006	Kitt Peak	Spacewatch	·	4.2 km	MPC · JPL
266042	2006 HV_{119}	—	April 30, 2006	Kitt Peak	Spacewatch	·	3.5 km	MPC · JPL
266043	2006 HM_{129}	—	April 26, 2006	Cerro Tololo	M. W. Buie	·	2.9 km	MPC · JPL
266044	2006 JB_{7}	—	May 1, 2006	Kitt Peak	Spacewatch	·	5.2 km	MPC · JPL
266045	2006 JU_{43}	—	May 5, 2006	Catalina	CSS	T_{j} (2.98) · EUP	4.0 km	MPC · JPL
266046	2006 KG_{57}	—	May 22, 2006	Kitt Peak	Spacewatch	·	3.5 km	MPC · JPL
266047	2006 KA_{69}	—	May 20, 2006	Siding Spring	SSS	·	2.2 km	MPC · JPL
266048	2006 KB_{87}	—	May 27, 2006	Catalina	CSS	H	850 m	MPC · JPL
266049	2006 KL_{99}	—	May 27, 2006	Catalina	CSS	·	5.0 km	MPC · JPL
266050	2006 KL_{107}	—	May 31, 2006	Mount Lemmon	Mount Lemmon Survey	·	4.3 km	MPC · JPL
266051 Hannawieser	2006 NB	Hannawieser	July 1, 2006	Winterthur	M. Griesser	EUP	5.2 km	MPC · JPL
266052	2006 PB_{2}	—	August 12, 2006	Palomar	NEAT	·	2.0 km	MPC · JPL
266053	2006 QJ_{27}	—	August 19, 2006	Palomar	NEAT	·	1.2 km	MPC · JPL
266054	2006 QW_{50}	—	August 22, 2006	Palomar	NEAT	·	1.0 km	MPC · JPL
266055	2006 QN_{59}	—	August 19, 2006	Anderson Mesa	LONEOS	·	1.1 km	MPC · JPL
266056	2006 QO_{83}	—	August 27, 2006	Kitt Peak	Spacewatch	·	680 m	MPC · JPL
266057	2006 QG_{97}	—	August 19, 2006	Kitt Peak	Spacewatch	·	810 m	MPC · JPL
266058	2006 QX_{100}	—	August 25, 2006	Lulin	Lin, C.-S., Q. Ye	·	830 m	MPC · JPL
266059	2006 QC_{112}	—	August 22, 2006	Palomar	NEAT	·	760 m	MPC · JPL
266060	2006 QA_{131}	—	August 20, 2006	Palomar	NEAT	·	5.6 km	MPC · JPL
266061	2006 QM_{135}	—	August 27, 2006	Anderson Mesa	LONEOS	V	710 m	MPC · JPL
266062	2006 QL_{144}	—	August 29, 2006	Catalina	CSS	·	1.4 km	MPC · JPL
266063	2006 QP_{147}	—	August 18, 2006	Kitt Peak	Spacewatch	·	690 m	MPC · JPL
266064	2006 QL_{153}	—	August 19, 2006	Kitt Peak	Spacewatch	·	650 m	MPC · JPL
266065	2006 QM_{158}	—	August 19, 2006	Kitt Peak	Spacewatch	·	770 m	MPC · JPL
266066	2006 RQ_{5}	—	September 14, 2006	Kitt Peak	Spacewatch	·	750 m	MPC · JPL
266067	2006 RY_{9}	—	September 13, 2006	Palomar	NEAT	·	850 m	MPC · JPL
266068	2006 RX_{10}	—	September 12, 2006	Catalina	CSS	·	840 m	MPC · JPL
266069	2006 RC_{11}	—	September 12, 2006	Catalina	CSS	·	1.1 km	MPC · JPL
266070	2006 RK_{19}	—	September 14, 2006	Kitt Peak	Spacewatch	NYS	1.1 km	MPC · JPL
266071	2006 RL_{39}	—	September 14, 2006	Palomar	NEAT	·	930 m	MPC · JPL
266072	2006 RD_{52}	—	September 14, 2006	Kitt Peak	Spacewatch	·	880 m	MPC · JPL
266073	2006 RN_{53}	—	September 14, 2006	Kitt Peak	Spacewatch	·	870 m	MPC · JPL
266074	2006 RV_{62}	—	September 14, 2006	Catalina	CSS	·	780 m	MPC · JPL
266075	2006 RR_{91}	—	September 15, 2006	Kitt Peak	Spacewatch	·	1.8 km	MPC · JPL
266076	2006 RQ_{95}	—	September 15, 2006	Kitt Peak	Spacewatch	·	1.6 km	MPC · JPL
266077	2006 RP_{96}	—	September 15, 2006	Kitt Peak	Spacewatch	·	990 m	MPC · JPL
266078	2006 RC_{97}	—	September 15, 2006	Kitt Peak	Spacewatch	·	880 m	MPC · JPL
266079	2006 RG_{101}	—	September 14, 2006	Palomar	NEAT	·	1.1 km	MPC · JPL
266080	2006 RQ_{101}	—	September 14, 2006	Catalina	CSS	NYS	1.3 km	MPC · JPL
266081 Villyket	2006 RP_{109}	Villyket	September 14, 2006	Mauna Kea	Masiero, J.	·	870 m	MPC · JPL
266082	2006 RR_{121}	—	September 15, 2006	Kitt Peak	Spacewatch	·	920 m	MPC · JPL
266083	2006 SZ_{4}	—	September 16, 2006	Palomar	NEAT	·	900 m	MPC · JPL
266084	2006 SN_{6}	—	September 16, 2006	Catalina	CSS	·	1.6 km	MPC · JPL
266085	2006 SX_{7}	—	September 16, 2006	Socorro	LINEAR	·	1.1 km	MPC · JPL
266086	2006 SA_{21}	—	September 16, 2006	Anderson Mesa	LONEOS	·	800 m	MPC · JPL
266087	2006 SP_{22}	—	September 17, 2006	Anderson Mesa	LONEOS	·	920 m	MPC · JPL
266088	2006 SB_{27}	—	September 16, 2006	Catalina	CSS	(2076)	970 m	MPC · JPL
266089	2006 SG_{33}	—	September 17, 2006	Catalina	CSS	V	940 m	MPC · JPL
266090	2006 SJ_{35}	—	September 17, 2006	Kitt Peak	Spacewatch	·	850 m	MPC · JPL
266091	2006 SP_{52}	—	September 19, 2006	Catalina	CSS	·	930 m	MPC · JPL
266092	2006 SM_{53}	—	September 19, 2006	La Sagra	OAM	NYS	1.1 km	MPC · JPL
266093	2006 SB_{56}	—	September 18, 2006	Kitt Peak	Spacewatch	·	860 m	MPC · JPL
266094	2006 SO_{59}	—	September 16, 2006	Anderson Mesa	LONEOS	·	1.0 km	MPC · JPL
266095	2006 SG_{60}	—	September 18, 2006	Catalina	CSS	·	940 m	MPC · JPL
266096	2006 ST_{67}	—	September 2, 1998	Kitt Peak	Spacewatch	·	1.2 km	MPC · JPL
266097	2006 SE_{75}	—	September 19, 2006	Kitt Peak	Spacewatch	·	810 m	MPC · JPL
266098	2006 SK_{78}	—	September 19, 2006	Charleston	Astronomical Research Observatory	·	820 m	MPC · JPL
266099	2006 SO_{93}	—	September 18, 2006	Kitt Peak	Spacewatch	MAS	810 m	MPC · JPL
266100	2006 SG_{97}	—	September 18, 2006	Kitt Peak	Spacewatch	·	630 m	MPC · JPL

== 266101–266200 ==
back to top

Designation			Discovery			Properties		Ref
Permanent	Provisional	Named after	Date	Site	Discoverer(s)	Category	Diam.	Ref
266101	2006 SO_{126}	—	September 21, 2006	Anderson Mesa	LONEOS	·	1.0 km	MPC · JPL
266102	2006 SK_{130}	—	September 20, 2006	Anderson Mesa	LONEOS	·	930 m	MPC · JPL
266103	2006 SB_{131}	—	September 24, 2006	Junk Bond	D. Healy	·	950 m	MPC · JPL
266104	2006 SP_{132}	—	September 16, 2006	Catalina	CSS	·	2.3 km	MPC · JPL
266105	2006 SQ_{163}	—	September 24, 2006	Kitt Peak	Spacewatch	·	830 m	MPC · JPL
266106	2006 SO_{197}	—	September 25, 2006	Mount Lemmon	Mount Lemmon Survey	MAS	860 m	MPC · JPL
266107	2006 ST_{207}	—	September 25, 2006	Kitt Peak	Spacewatch	·	1.1 km	MPC · JPL
266108	2006 SV_{218}	—	September 26, 2006	Goodricke-Pigott	R. A. Tucker	·	1.2 km	MPC · JPL
266109	2006 ST_{245}	—	September 26, 2006	Socorro	LINEAR	·	1.0 km	MPC · JPL
266110	2006 SU_{267}	—	September 26, 2006	Kitt Peak	Spacewatch	·	720 m	MPC · JPL
266111	2006 SQ_{274}	—	September 27, 2006	Mount Lemmon	Mount Lemmon Survey	(5)	1.6 km	MPC · JPL
266112	2006 SY_{274}	—	September 27, 2006	Mount Lemmon	Mount Lemmon Survey	·	2.1 km	MPC · JPL
266113	2006 SP_{275}	—	September 27, 2006	Mount Lemmon	Mount Lemmon Survey	·	1.1 km	MPC · JPL
266114	2006 SB_{286}	—	September 18, 2006	Catalina	CSS	·	880 m	MPC · JPL
266115	2006 SV_{303}	—	September 27, 2006	Mount Lemmon	Mount Lemmon Survey	·	800 m	MPC · JPL
266116	2006 SQ_{310}	—	September 27, 2006	Kitt Peak	Spacewatch	·	1.3 km	MPC · JPL
266117	2006 SK_{317}	—	September 27, 2006	Kitt Peak	Spacewatch	·	1.3 km	MPC · JPL
266118	2006 SP_{341}	—	September 28, 2006	Mount Lemmon	Mount Lemmon Survey	NYS	950 m	MPC · JPL
266119	2006 SO_{342}	—	September 28, 2006	Kitt Peak	Spacewatch	·	770 m	MPC · JPL
266120	2006 SD_{345}	—	September 28, 2006	Kitt Peak	Spacewatch	·	900 m	MPC · JPL
266121	2006 SO_{353}	—	September 30, 2006	Catalina	CSS	·	790 m	MPC · JPL
266122	2006 ST_{391}	—	September 18, 2006	Catalina	CSS	(2076)	1.1 km	MPC · JPL
266123	2006 SY_{400}	—	September 26, 2006	Catalina	CSS	·	1.5 km	MPC · JPL
266124	2006 SG_{413}	—	September 20, 2006	Catalina	CSS	·	1.8 km	MPC · JPL
266125	2006 TP_{12}	—	October 10, 2006	Palomar	NEAT	NYS	760 m	MPC · JPL
266126	2006 TQ_{16}	—	October 11, 2006	Kitt Peak	Spacewatch	·	850 m	MPC · JPL
266127	2006 TR_{21}	—	October 11, 2006	Kitt Peak	Spacewatch	·	980 m	MPC · JPL
266128	2006 TB_{27}	—	October 12, 2006	Kitt Peak	Spacewatch	fast	830 m	MPC · JPL
266129	2006 TJ_{36}	—	October 12, 2006	Kitt Peak	Spacewatch	·	1.5 km	MPC · JPL
266130	2006 TY_{37}	—	October 12, 2006	Kitt Peak	Spacewatch	·	1.4 km	MPC · JPL
266131	2006 TH_{39}	—	October 12, 2006	Kitt Peak	Spacewatch	·	1.1 km	MPC · JPL
266132	2006 TT_{45}	—	October 12, 2006	Kitt Peak	Spacewatch	·	810 m	MPC · JPL
266133	2006 TD_{49}	—	October 12, 2006	Palomar	NEAT	·	830 m	MPC · JPL
266134	2006 TA_{58}	—	October 15, 2006	Catalina	CSS	·	1.0 km	MPC · JPL
266135	2006 TG_{63}	—	October 10, 2006	Palomar	NEAT	PHO	1.4 km	MPC · JPL
266136	2006 TS_{63}	—	October 10, 2006	Palomar	NEAT	·	1.1 km	MPC · JPL
266137	2006 TH_{66}	—	October 11, 2006	Palomar	NEAT	NYS	1.2 km	MPC · JPL
266138	2006 TH_{71}	—	October 11, 2006	Palomar	NEAT	·	840 m	MPC · JPL
266139	2006 TR_{80}	—	October 13, 2006	Kitt Peak	Spacewatch	·	1.1 km	MPC · JPL
266140	2006 TP_{89}	—	October 13, 2006	Kitt Peak	Spacewatch	·	1.1 km	MPC · JPL
266141	2006 TF_{97}	—	October 13, 2006	Kitt Peak	Spacewatch	·	1.5 km	MPC · JPL
266142	2006 TM_{97}	—	October 13, 2006	Kitt Peak	Spacewatch	·	800 m	MPC · JPL
266143	2006 TB_{100}	—	October 15, 2006	Kitt Peak	Spacewatch	·	770 m	MPC · JPL
266144	2006 TX_{100}	—	October 15, 2006	Kitt Peak	Spacewatch	·	840 m	MPC · JPL
266145	2006 TA_{123}	—	October 12, 2006	Kitt Peak	Spacewatch	·	810 m	MPC · JPL
266146	2006 UY_{12}	—	October 17, 2006	Mount Lemmon	Mount Lemmon Survey	·	910 m	MPC · JPL
266147	2006 UG_{29}	—	October 16, 2006	Kitt Peak	Spacewatch	·	870 m	MPC · JPL
266148	2006 UT_{30}	—	October 16, 2006	Kitt Peak	Spacewatch	·	860 m	MPC · JPL
266149	2006 UH_{32}	—	October 16, 2006	Kitt Peak	Spacewatch	·	1.0 km	MPC · JPL
266150	2006 UN_{35}	—	October 16, 2006	Catalina	CSS	NYS	1.3 km	MPC · JPL
266151	2006 UB_{37}	—	October 16, 2006	Kitt Peak	Spacewatch	·	770 m	MPC · JPL
266152	2006 UG_{59}	—	October 19, 2006	Kitt Peak	Spacewatch	·	710 m	MPC · JPL
266153	2006 UR_{67}	—	October 16, 2006	Catalina	CSS	·	1.2 km	MPC · JPL
266154	2006 UW_{67}	—	October 16, 2006	Catalina	CSS	·	1.1 km	MPC · JPL
266155	2006 UB_{68}	—	October 16, 2006	Catalina	CSS	V	810 m	MPC · JPL
266156	2006 UF_{80}	—	October 17, 2006	Mount Lemmon	Mount Lemmon Survey	MAS	930 m	MPC · JPL
266157	2006 UL_{90}	—	October 17, 2006	Kitt Peak	Spacewatch	·	2.3 km	MPC · JPL
266158	2006 UA_{93}	—	October 18, 2006	Kitt Peak	Spacewatch	·	1.1 km	MPC · JPL
266159	2006 UZ_{105}	—	October 18, 2006	Kitt Peak	Spacewatch	ERI	1.5 km	MPC · JPL
266160	2006 UV_{109}	—	October 19, 2006	Kitt Peak	Spacewatch	V	820 m	MPC · JPL
266161	2006 UH_{112}	—	October 19, 2006	Kitt Peak	Spacewatch	·	940 m	MPC · JPL
266162	2006 UA_{131}	—	October 19, 2006	Kitt Peak	Spacewatch	·	1.0 km	MPC · JPL
266163	2006 UM_{155}	—	October 21, 2006	Catalina	CSS	·	890 m	MPC · JPL
266164	2006 UD_{160}	—	October 21, 2006	Mount Lemmon	Mount Lemmon Survey	·	800 m	MPC · JPL
266165	2006 UO_{200}	—	October 21, 2006	Kitt Peak	Spacewatch	·	1 km	MPC · JPL
266166	2006 UF_{217}	—	October 28, 2006	Mount Lemmon	Mount Lemmon Survey	·	1.3 km	MPC · JPL
266167	2006 UN_{219}	—	October 16, 2006	Kitt Peak	Spacewatch	V	780 m	MPC · JPL
266168	2006 UY_{223}	—	October 19, 2006	Mount Lemmon	Mount Lemmon Survey	·	800 m	MPC · JPL
266169	2006 UN_{225}	—	October 19, 2006	Palomar	NEAT	·	1.2 km	MPC · JPL
266170	2006 UC_{252}	—	October 27, 2006	Catalina	CSS	ERI	2.1 km	MPC · JPL
266171	2006 UL_{253}	—	October 27, 2006	Mount Lemmon	Mount Lemmon Survey	V	730 m	MPC · JPL
266172	2006 UW_{266}	—	October 27, 2006	Catalina	CSS	·	1.3 km	MPC · JPL
266173	2006 UR_{269}	—	October 27, 2006	Kitt Peak	Spacewatch	·	1.2 km	MPC · JPL
266174	2006 UF_{278}	—	October 28, 2006	Kitt Peak	Spacewatch	·	960 m	MPC · JPL
266175	2006 UQ_{282}	—	October 28, 2006	Mount Lemmon	Mount Lemmon Survey	·	1.1 km	MPC · JPL
266176	2006 UA_{329}	—	October 21, 2006	Mount Lemmon	Mount Lemmon Survey	·	1.1 km	MPC · JPL
266177	2006 VT_{18}	—	November 9, 2006	Kitt Peak	Spacewatch	·	1.1 km	MPC · JPL
266178	2006 VF_{19}	—	November 9, 2006	Kitt Peak	Spacewatch	·	860 m	MPC · JPL
266179	2006 VU_{35}	—	November 11, 2006	Mount Lemmon	Mount Lemmon Survey	·	890 m	MPC · JPL
266180	2006 VD_{43}	—	November 13, 2006	Kitt Peak	Spacewatch	V	800 m	MPC · JPL
266181	2006 VX_{46}	—	November 9, 2006	Kitt Peak	Spacewatch	·	1.0 km	MPC · JPL
266182	2006 VA_{63}	—	November 11, 2006	Kitt Peak	Spacewatch	·	1.2 km	MPC · JPL
266183	2006 VE_{75}	—	November 11, 2006	Kitt Peak	Spacewatch	NYS	1.6 km	MPC · JPL
266184	2006 VM_{86}	—	November 14, 2006	Socorro	LINEAR	·	1.2 km	MPC · JPL
266185	2006 VS_{100}	—	November 11, 2006	Catalina	CSS	·	1.5 km	MPC · JPL
266186	2006 VM_{101}	—	November 11, 2006	Palomar	NEAT	NYS	1.3 km	MPC · JPL
266187	2006 VL_{103}	—	November 12, 2006	Lulin	Lin, H.-C., Q. Ye	·	1.0 km	MPC · JPL
266188	2006 VX_{103}	—	November 12, 2006	Lulin	Lin, H.-C., Q. Ye	·	1.2 km	MPC · JPL
266189	2006 VG_{106}	—	November 13, 2006	Catalina	CSS	·	1.0 km	MPC · JPL
266190	2006 VS_{106}	—	November 13, 2006	Catalina	CSS	·	1.1 km	MPC · JPL
266191	2006 VS_{109}	—	November 13, 2006	Catalina	CSS	·	1.0 km	MPC · JPL
266192	2006 VC_{112}	—	November 13, 2006	Palomar	NEAT	·	890 m	MPC · JPL
266193	2006 VC_{130}	—	November 15, 2006	Kitt Peak	Spacewatch	·	1.5 km	MPC · JPL
266194	2006 VW_{132}	—	November 15, 2006	Kitt Peak	Spacewatch	V	800 m	MPC · JPL
266195	2006 VT_{134}	—	November 15, 2006	Socorro	LINEAR	·	1.5 km	MPC · JPL
266196	2006 VG_{152}	—	November 9, 2006	Palomar	NEAT	MAS	610 m	MPC · JPL
266197	2006 VX_{168}	—	November 11, 2006	Kitt Peak	Spacewatch	·	1.4 km	MPC · JPL
266198	2006 VQ_{170}	—	November 15, 2006	Mount Lemmon	Mount Lemmon Survey	·	1.3 km	MPC · JPL
266199	2006 WH_{2}	—	November 17, 2006	Vail-Jarnac	Jarnac	PHO	2.0 km	MPC · JPL
266200	2006 WK_{10}	—	November 16, 2006	Kitt Peak	Spacewatch	·	1.6 km	MPC · JPL

== 266201–266300 ==
back to top

Designation			Discovery			Properties		Ref
Permanent	Provisional	Named after	Date	Site	Discoverer(s)	Category	Diam.	Ref
266201	2006 WZ_{17}	—	November 17, 2006	Mount Lemmon	Mount Lemmon Survey	·	740 m	MPC · JPL
266202	2006 WO_{20}	—	November 17, 2006	Mount Lemmon	Mount Lemmon Survey	·	850 m	MPC · JPL
266203	2006 WJ_{28}	—	November 22, 2006	7300	W. K. Y. Yeung	·	1.2 km	MPC · JPL
266204	2006 WS_{56}	—	November 16, 2006	Kitt Peak	Spacewatch	(5)	2.3 km	MPC · JPL
266205	2006 WR_{58}	—	November 17, 2006	Kitt Peak	Spacewatch	·	850 m	MPC · JPL
266206	2006 WA_{68}	—	November 17, 2006	Mount Lemmon	Mount Lemmon Survey	·	1.4 km	MPC · JPL
266207	2006 WY_{86}	—	November 18, 2006	Socorro	LINEAR	PHO	3.4 km	MPC · JPL
266208	2006 WW_{93}	—	November 19, 2006	Kitt Peak	Spacewatch	·	870 m	MPC · JPL
266209	2006 WP_{96}	—	November 19, 2006	Kitt Peak	Spacewatch	·	2.1 km	MPC · JPL
266210	2006 WE_{103}	—	November 19, 2006	Kitt Peak	Spacewatch	·	990 m	MPC · JPL
266211	2006 WL_{135}	—	November 18, 2006	Mount Lemmon	Mount Lemmon Survey	V	780 m	MPC · JPL
266212	2006 WH_{150}	—	November 20, 2006	Kitt Peak	Spacewatch	NYS	1.1 km	MPC · JPL
266213	2006 WV_{153}	—	November 22, 2006	Kitt Peak	Spacewatch	·	980 m	MPC · JPL
266214	2006 WV_{154}	—	November 22, 2006	Kitt Peak	Spacewatch	·	3.0 km	MPC · JPL
266215	2006 WR_{157}	—	November 22, 2006	Catalina	CSS	·	1.1 km	MPC · JPL
266216	2006 WV_{171}	—	November 23, 2006	Kitt Peak	Spacewatch	·	1.1 km	MPC · JPL
266217	2006 WS_{184}	—	November 27, 2006	Mount Lemmon	Mount Lemmon Survey	SUL	3.0 km	MPC · JPL
266218	2006 WD_{189}	—	November 24, 2006	Mount Lemmon	Mount Lemmon Survey	·	1.9 km	MPC · JPL
266219	2006 WP_{195}	—	November 30, 2006	Kitt Peak	Spacewatch	(5)	1.5 km	MPC · JPL
266220	2006 WU_{198}	—	November 20, 2006	Kitt Peak	Spacewatch	V	800 m	MPC · JPL
266221	2006 WA_{200}	—	November 16, 2006	Kitt Peak	Spacewatch	·	1.6 km	MPC · JPL
266222	2006 WD_{200}	—	November 17, 2006	Kitt Peak	Spacewatch	·	1.7 km	MPC · JPL
266223	2006 WJ_{200}	—	November 19, 2006	Kitt Peak	Spacewatch	·	1.1 km	MPC · JPL
266224	2006 WS_{202}	—	November 21, 2006	Mount Lemmon	Mount Lemmon Survey	·	2.1 km	MPC · JPL
266225	2006 WW_{202}	—	November 27, 2006	Mount Lemmon	Mount Lemmon Survey	·	2.1 km	MPC · JPL
266226	2006 WF_{205}	—	November 19, 2006	Kitt Peak	Spacewatch	·	2.0 km	MPC · JPL
266227	2006 XR	—	December 9, 2006	Pla D'Arguines	R. Ferrando	·	1.8 km	MPC · JPL
266228	2006 XU_{4}	—	December 13, 2006	7300	W. K. Y. Yeung	·	1.5 km	MPC · JPL
266229	2006 XC_{8}	—	December 9, 2006	Palomar	NEAT	EUN	1.5 km	MPC · JPL
266230	2006 XM_{12}	—	December 10, 2006	Kitt Peak	Spacewatch	MAS	910 m	MPC · JPL
266231	2006 XK_{15}	—	December 10, 2006	Kitt Peak	Spacewatch	·	2.1 km	MPC · JPL
266232	2006 XO_{17}	—	December 10, 2006	Kitt Peak	Spacewatch	NYS	1.5 km	MPC · JPL
266233	2006 XQ_{19}	—	December 11, 2006	Kitt Peak	Spacewatch	MAS	880 m	MPC · JPL
266234	2006 XJ_{22}	—	December 12, 2006	Kitt Peak	Spacewatch	·	1.2 km	MPC · JPL
266235	2006 XB_{23}	—	December 12, 2006	Kitt Peak	Spacewatch	·	1.4 km	MPC · JPL
266236	2006 XY_{24}	—	December 12, 2006	Mount Lemmon	Mount Lemmon Survey	MAS	860 m	MPC · JPL
266237	2006 XK_{37}	—	December 11, 2006	Kitt Peak	Spacewatch	·	1.7 km	MPC · JPL
266238	2006 XZ_{39}	—	December 12, 2006	Kitt Peak	Spacewatch	NYS	1.0 km	MPC · JPL
266239	2006 XT_{40}	—	December 12, 2006	Kitt Peak	Spacewatch	·	1.7 km	MPC · JPL
266240	2006 XY_{46}	—	December 13, 2006	Catalina	CSS	NYS	2.0 km	MPC · JPL
266241	2006 XD_{51}	—	December 13, 2006	Kitt Peak	Spacewatch	·	1.9 km	MPC · JPL
266242	2006 XT_{52}	—	December 14, 2006	Socorro	LINEAR	ERI	1.8 km	MPC · JPL
266243	2006 XB_{57}	—	December 13, 2006	Catalina	CSS	·	1.9 km	MPC · JPL
266244	2006 XX_{60}	—	December 15, 2006	Palomar	NEAT	·	1.2 km	MPC · JPL
266245	2006 XV_{63}	—	December 9, 2006	Kitt Peak	Spacewatch	·	2.0 km	MPC · JPL
266246	2006 XH_{70}	—	December 13, 2006	Kitt Peak	Spacewatch	·	1.5 km	MPC · JPL
266247	2006 XX_{70}	—	December 13, 2006	Mount Lemmon	Mount Lemmon Survey	·	1.7 km	MPC · JPL
266248	2006 XN_{73}	—	December 15, 2006	Mount Lemmon	Mount Lemmon Survey	·	2.4 km	MPC · JPL
266249	2006 YM_{1}	—	December 16, 2006	Kitt Peak	Spacewatch	·	1.2 km	MPC · JPL
266250	2006 YO_{1}	—	December 16, 2006	Mount Lemmon	Mount Lemmon Survey	(5)	1.4 km	MPC · JPL
266251	2006 YE_{2}	—	December 17, 2006	7300	W. K. Y. Yeung	·	1.5 km	MPC · JPL
266252	2006 YE_{3}	—	December 16, 2006	Kitt Peak	Spacewatch	·	1.9 km	MPC · JPL
266253	2006 YB_{4}	—	December 16, 2006	Kitt Peak	Spacewatch	·	1.9 km	MPC · JPL
266254	2006 YZ_{8}	—	December 20, 2006	Mount Lemmon	Mount Lemmon Survey	·	1.9 km	MPC · JPL
266255	2006 YB_{9}	—	December 20, 2006	Mount Lemmon	Mount Lemmon Survey	(5)	1.5 km	MPC · JPL
266256	2006 YO_{16}	—	December 21, 2006	Mount Lemmon	Mount Lemmon Survey	MAS	970 m	MPC · JPL
266257	2006 YA_{19}	—	December 24, 2006	Catalina	CSS	·	2.1 km	MPC · JPL
266258	2006 YD_{19}	—	December 24, 2006	Kitt Peak	Spacewatch	·	1.5 km	MPC · JPL
266259	2006 YK_{36}	—	December 21, 2006	Kitt Peak	Spacewatch	·	1.6 km	MPC · JPL
266260	2006 YM_{36}	—	December 21, 2006	Kitt Peak	Spacewatch	·	1.0 km	MPC · JPL
266261	2006 YD_{37}	—	December 21, 2006	Kitt Peak	Spacewatch	·	1.5 km	MPC · JPL
266262	2006 YY_{41}	—	August 11, 2001	Palomar	NEAT	·	2.0 km	MPC · JPL
266263	2006 YG_{43}	—	December 24, 2006	Kitt Peak	Spacewatch	PHO	4.2 km	MPC · JPL
266264	2006 YC_{47}	—	December 22, 2006	Socorro	LINEAR	V	870 m	MPC · JPL
266265	2007 AY_{3}	—	January 8, 2007	Catalina	CSS	·	2.0 km	MPC · JPL
266266	2007 AL_{6}	—	January 8, 2007	Mount Lemmon	Mount Lemmon Survey	·	1.4 km	MPC · JPL
266267	2007 AX_{9}	—	January 8, 2007	Mount Lemmon	Mount Lemmon Survey	EUN	1.6 km	MPC · JPL
266268	2007 AE_{11}	—	January 10, 2007	Mount Lemmon	Mount Lemmon Survey	PHO	1.6 km	MPC · JPL
266269	2007 AM_{14}	—	January 9, 2007	Mount Lemmon	Mount Lemmon Survey	MAS	900 m	MPC · JPL
266270	2007 AZ_{15}	—	January 10, 2007	Mount Lemmon	Mount Lemmon Survey	·	1.6 km	MPC · JPL
266271	2007 AE_{16}	—	January 10, 2007	Kitt Peak	Spacewatch	·	1.1 km	MPC · JPL
266272	2007 AN_{16}	—	January 10, 2007	Mount Lemmon	Mount Lemmon Survey	·	1.2 km	MPC · JPL
266273	2007 AX_{16}	—	January 15, 2007	Catalina	CSS	·	1.6 km	MPC · JPL
266274	2007 AH_{20}	—	January 10, 2007	Socorro	LINEAR	NYS	1.9 km	MPC · JPL
266275	2007 AS_{22}	—	January 10, 2007	Catalina	CSS	·	1.6 km	MPC · JPL
266276	2007 AX_{23}	—	January 10, 2007	Mount Lemmon	Mount Lemmon Survey	NYS	1.3 km	MPC · JPL
266277	2007 AG_{24}	—	January 10, 2007	Mount Lemmon	Mount Lemmon Survey	·	1.5 km	MPC · JPL
266278	2007 BO_{2}	—	January 17, 2007	Kitt Peak	Spacewatch	MAS	960 m	MPC · JPL
266279	2007 BD_{4}	—	January 16, 2007	Socorro	LINEAR	·	1.4 km	MPC · JPL
266280	2007 BE_{4}	—	January 16, 2007	Socorro	LINEAR	·	2.1 km	MPC · JPL
266281	2007 BK_{6}	—	January 17, 2007	Palomar	NEAT	·	2.1 km	MPC · JPL
266282	2007 BA_{7}	—	January 18, 2007	Palomar	NEAT	NYS	1.7 km	MPC · JPL
266283	2007 BK_{11}	—	January 17, 2007	Palomar	NEAT	·	1.3 km	MPC · JPL
266284	2007 BO_{14}	—	January 17, 2007	Kitt Peak	Spacewatch	·	1.7 km	MPC · JPL
266285	2007 BW_{14}	—	January 17, 2007	Kitt Peak	Spacewatch	·	1.7 km	MPC · JPL
266286 Bodenmüller	2007 BQ_{19}	Bodenmüller	January 21, 2007	Altschwendt	W. Ries	·	1.4 km	MPC · JPL
266287	2007 BU_{29}	—	January 24, 2007	Socorro	LINEAR	·	2.2 km	MPC · JPL
266288	2007 BM_{31}	—	January 26, 2007	Calvin-Rehoboth	L. A. Molnar	·	1.3 km	MPC · JPL
266289	2007 BQ_{31}	—	January 21, 2007	Socorro	LINEAR	MAS	1.1 km	MPC · JPL
266290	2007 BL_{36}	—	January 24, 2007	Socorro	LINEAR	·	2.0 km	MPC · JPL
266291	2007 BF_{42}	—	January 24, 2007	Catalina	CSS	·	1.4 km	MPC · JPL
266292	2007 BV_{43}	—	January 24, 2007	Catalina	CSS	·	2.4 km	MPC · JPL
266293	2007 BB_{44}	—	January 24, 2007	Catalina	CSS	MAS	1.3 km	MPC · JPL
266294	2007 BW_{45}	—	January 26, 2007	Anderson Mesa	LONEOS	NYS	1.5 km	MPC · JPL
266295	2007 BR_{47}	—	January 26, 2007	Kitt Peak	Spacewatch	·	1.7 km	MPC · JPL
266296	2007 BZ_{52}	—	January 24, 2007	Kitt Peak	Spacewatch	·	1.8 km	MPC · JPL
266297	2007 BN_{70}	—	January 27, 2007	Mount Lemmon	Mount Lemmon Survey	·	3.4 km	MPC · JPL
266298	2007 BB_{75}	—	January 27, 2007	Kitt Peak	Spacewatch	·	2.0 km	MPC · JPL
266299	2007 BK_{78}	—	January 24, 2007	Catalina	CSS	(5)	1.4 km	MPC · JPL
266300	2007 BN_{90}	—	January 19, 2007	Mauna Kea	Mauna Kea	·	1.6 km	MPC · JPL

== 266301–266400 ==
back to top

Designation			Discovery			Properties		Ref
Permanent	Provisional	Named after	Date	Site	Discoverer(s)	Category	Diam.	Ref
266301	2007 BT_{101}	—	January 16, 2007	Catalina	CSS	ADE	2.7 km	MPC · JPL
266302	2007 CG	—	February 6, 2007	Mount Lemmon	Mount Lemmon Survey	·	1.2 km	MPC · JPL
266303	2007 CK_{5}	—	February 7, 2007	Kitt Peak	Spacewatch	(5)	1.4 km	MPC · JPL
266304	2007 CO_{8}	—	February 6, 2007	Kitt Peak	Spacewatch	·	1.4 km	MPC · JPL
266305	2007 CW_{11}	—	February 6, 2007	Palomar	NEAT	EUN	1.5 km	MPC · JPL
266306	2007 CD_{12}	—	February 6, 2007	Mount Lemmon	Mount Lemmon Survey	·	1.5 km	MPC · JPL
266307	2007 CS_{14}	—	February 7, 2007	Mount Lemmon	Mount Lemmon Survey	(5)	1.5 km	MPC · JPL
266308	2007 CR_{19}	—	February 6, 2007	Kitt Peak	Spacewatch	·	1.2 km	MPC · JPL
266309	2007 CO_{20}	—	February 6, 2007	Mount Lemmon	Mount Lemmon Survey	·	1.8 km	MPC · JPL
266310	2007 CO_{29}	—	February 6, 2007	Mount Lemmon	Mount Lemmon Survey	·	1.3 km	MPC · JPL
266311	2007 CK_{31}	—	February 6, 2007	Mount Lemmon	Mount Lemmon Survey	·	1.7 km	MPC · JPL
266312	2007 CY_{37}	—	February 6, 2007	Kitt Peak	Spacewatch	ADE · slow	3.7 km	MPC · JPL
266313	2007 CU_{40}	—	February 7, 2007	Kitt Peak	Spacewatch	(5)	1.5 km	MPC · JPL
266314	2007 CO_{45}	—	February 8, 2007	Palomar	NEAT	·	1.6 km	MPC · JPL
266315	2007 CQ_{50}	—	February 9, 2007	Kitt Peak	Spacewatch	·	2.1 km	MPC · JPL
266316	2007 CT_{52}	—	February 10, 2007	Catalina	CSS	·	1.8 km	MPC · JPL
266317	2007 CQ_{56}	—	February 15, 2007	Catalina	CSS	·	1.2 km	MPC · JPL
266318	2007 CS_{56}	—	February 15, 2007	Catalina	CSS	·	1.7 km	MPC · JPL
266319	2007 CV_{64}	—	February 7, 2007	Mount Lemmon	Mount Lemmon Survey	·	2.3 km	MPC · JPL
266320	2007 CD_{65}	—	February 7, 2007	Kitt Peak	Spacewatch	·	2.3 km	MPC · JPL
266321	2007 CL_{65}	—	February 7, 2007	Mount Lemmon	Mount Lemmon Survey	·	2.7 km	MPC · JPL
266322	2007 CU_{65}	—	February 6, 2007	Kitt Peak	Spacewatch	·	1.2 km	MPC · JPL
266323	2007 DL_{2}	—	February 16, 2007	Mount Lemmon	Mount Lemmon Survey	·	1.9 km	MPC · JPL
266324	2007 DT_{2}	—	February 16, 2007	Catalina	CSS	·	1.8 km	MPC · JPL
266325	2007 DF_{6}	—	February 17, 2007	Kitt Peak	Spacewatch	·	1.9 km	MPC · JPL
266326	2007 DV_{9}	—	February 17, 2007	Kitt Peak	Spacewatch	WIT	1.3 km	MPC · JPL
266327	2007 DN_{17}	—	February 17, 2007	Kitt Peak	Spacewatch	·	2.0 km	MPC · JPL
266328	2007 DC_{19}	—	February 17, 2007	Kitt Peak	Spacewatch	·	1.5 km	MPC · JPL
266329	2007 DB_{24}	—	February 17, 2007	Kitt Peak	Spacewatch	·	1.7 km	MPC · JPL
266330	2007 DH_{24}	—	February 17, 2007	Kitt Peak	Spacewatch	·	1.6 km	MPC · JPL
266331	2007 DP_{25}	—	February 17, 2007	Kitt Peak	Spacewatch	·	1.5 km	MPC · JPL
266332	2007 DG_{38}	—	February 17, 2007	Kitt Peak	Spacewatch	(12739)	2.2 km	MPC · JPL
266333	2007 DJ_{42}	—	February 16, 2007	Palomar	NEAT	(5)	1.5 km	MPC · JPL
266334	2007 DB_{47}	—	February 21, 2007	Socorro	LINEAR	(5)	1.6 km	MPC · JPL
266335	2007 DF_{59}	—	February 22, 2007	Kitt Peak	Spacewatch	JUN	1.2 km	MPC · JPL
266336	2007 DT_{59}	—	February 22, 2007	Anderson Mesa	LONEOS	·	1.4 km	MPC · JPL
266337	2007 DD_{60}	—	February 23, 2007	Mount Lemmon	Mount Lemmon Survey	·	2.1 km	MPC · JPL
266338	2007 DO_{70}	—	February 21, 2007	Kitt Peak	Spacewatch	·	2.2 km	MPC · JPL
266339	2007 DW_{74}	—	February 21, 2007	Kitt Peak	Spacewatch	KOR	1.5 km	MPC · JPL
266340	2007 DW_{77}	—	February 23, 2007	Kitt Peak	Spacewatch	·	1.9 km	MPC · JPL
266341	2007 DK_{80}	—	February 23, 2007	Mount Lemmon	Mount Lemmon Survey	·	1.6 km	MPC · JPL
266342	2007 DO_{86}	—	February 23, 2007	Mount Lemmon	Mount Lemmon Survey	·	2.2 km	MPC · JPL
266343	2007 DT_{89}	—	February 23, 2007	Mount Lemmon	Mount Lemmon Survey	·	1.4 km	MPC · JPL
266344	2007 DE_{90}	—	February 23, 2007	Kitt Peak	Spacewatch	·	1.5 km	MPC · JPL
266345	2007 DU_{93}	—	February 23, 2007	Kitt Peak	Spacewatch	·	2.9 km	MPC · JPL
266346	2007 DE_{95}	—	February 23, 2007	Kitt Peak	Spacewatch	·	1.4 km	MPC · JPL
266347	2007 DK_{101}	—	February 26, 2007	Mount Lemmon	Mount Lemmon Survey	KOR	1.9 km	MPC · JPL
266348	2007 DC_{102}	—	February 24, 2007	Mount Nyukasa	Japan Aerospace Exploration Agency	·	2.5 km	MPC · JPL
266349	2007 DA_{103}	—	February 17, 2007	Palomar	NEAT	PHO	3.6 km	MPC · JPL
266350	2007 DN_{105}	—	February 16, 2007	Catalina	CSS	MAR	1.6 km	MPC · JPL
266351	2007 DU_{105}	—	February 17, 2007	Kitt Peak	Spacewatch	AEO	1.6 km	MPC · JPL
266352	2007 DG_{109}	—	February 21, 2007	Mount Lemmon	Mount Lemmon Survey	·	1.3 km	MPC · JPL
266353	2007 DV_{112}	—	February 16, 2007	Catalina	CSS	·	2.6 km	MPC · JPL
266354	2007 DT_{114}	—	February 27, 2007	Kitt Peak	Spacewatch	AGN	1.1 km	MPC · JPL
266355	2007 DK_{116}	—	February 26, 2007	Mount Lemmon	Mount Lemmon Survey	·	1.7 km	MPC · JPL
266356	2007 EQ_{3}	—	March 9, 2007	Catalina	CSS	·	2.2 km	MPC · JPL
266357	2007 EY_{9}	—	March 10, 2007	Marly	P. Kocher	·	2.5 km	MPC · JPL
266358	2007 ED_{25}	—	March 10, 2007	Mount Lemmon	Mount Lemmon Survey	·	2.3 km	MPC · JPL
266359	2007 EU_{34}	—	March 10, 2007	Palomar	NEAT	RAF	1.6 km	MPC · JPL
266360	2007 EH_{35}	—	March 11, 2007	Kitt Peak	Spacewatch	·	3.7 km	MPC · JPL
266361	2007 EE_{42}	—	March 9, 2007	Kitt Peak	Spacewatch	WIT	1.3 km	MPC · JPL
266362	2007 EW_{48}	—	March 9, 2007	Kitt Peak	Spacewatch	·	3.4 km	MPC · JPL
266363	2007 ED_{49}	—	March 9, 2007	Kitt Peak	Spacewatch	·	2.0 km	MPC · JPL
266364	2007 ET_{52}	—	March 11, 2007	Mount Lemmon	Mount Lemmon Survey	·	1.3 km	MPC · JPL
266365	2007 ER_{56}	—	March 12, 2007	Mount Lemmon	Mount Lemmon Survey	·	1.6 km	MPC · JPL
266366	2007 EO_{62}	—	March 10, 2007	Kitt Peak	Spacewatch	·	1.8 km	MPC · JPL
266367	2007 EM_{64}	—	March 10, 2007	Mount Lemmon	Mount Lemmon Survey	·	1.6 km	MPC · JPL
266368	2007 EE_{66}	—	March 10, 2007	Kitt Peak	Spacewatch	KOR	1.7 km	MPC · JPL
266369	2007 EY_{77}	—	March 10, 2007	Mount Lemmon	Mount Lemmon Survey	·	1.8 km	MPC · JPL
266370	2007 EE_{78}	—	March 10, 2007	Mount Lemmon	Mount Lemmon Survey	·	2.3 km	MPC · JPL
266371	2007 EP_{78}	—	March 10, 2007	Mount Lemmon	Mount Lemmon Survey	·	1.9 km	MPC · JPL
266372	2007 EM_{80}	—	March 11, 2007	Kitt Peak	Spacewatch	·	1.1 km	MPC · JPL
266373	2007 EG_{83}	—	March 12, 2007	Kitt Peak	Spacewatch	ADE	2.5 km	MPC · JPL
266374	2007 EJ_{97}	—	March 10, 2007	Palomar	NEAT	·	1.8 km	MPC · JPL
266375	2007 EN_{99}	—	March 11, 2007	Kitt Peak	Spacewatch	(11882)	1.9 km	MPC · JPL
266376	2007 EP_{100}	—	March 11, 2007	Catalina	CSS	EUN	1.8 km	MPC · JPL
266377	2007 ED_{105}	—	March 11, 2007	Mount Lemmon	Mount Lemmon Survey	WIT	1.5 km	MPC · JPL
266378	2007 ET_{111}	—	March 11, 2007	Kitt Peak	Spacewatch	·	2.6 km	MPC · JPL
266379	2007 EZ_{111}	—	March 11, 2007	Kitt Peak	Spacewatch	·	2.6 km	MPC · JPL
266380	2007 ED_{113}	—	March 12, 2007	Kitt Peak	Spacewatch	·	1.4 km	MPC · JPL
266381	2007 EF_{115}	—	March 13, 2007	Mount Lemmon	Mount Lemmon Survey	·	2.7 km	MPC · JPL
266382	2007 EN_{115}	—	March 13, 2007	Mount Lemmon	Mount Lemmon Survey	·	2.4 km	MPC · JPL
266383	2007 EE_{120}	—	March 13, 2007	Mount Lemmon	Mount Lemmon Survey	·	1.9 km	MPC · JPL
266384	2007 EV_{122}	—	March 14, 2007	Mount Lemmon	Mount Lemmon Survey	MAR ·	3.5 km	MPC · JPL
266385	2007 ET_{124}	—	March 14, 2007	Catalina	CSS	JUN	1.5 km	MPC · JPL
266386	2007 EK_{128}	—	March 9, 2007	Mount Lemmon	Mount Lemmon Survey	·	1.7 km	MPC · JPL
266387	2007 EN_{131}	—	March 9, 2007	Mount Lemmon	Mount Lemmon Survey	·	1.5 km	MPC · JPL
266388	2007 ET_{131}	—	March 9, 2007	Mount Lemmon	Mount Lemmon Survey	PAD	2.2 km	MPC · JPL
266389	2007 EH_{135}	—	March 10, 2007	Mount Lemmon	Mount Lemmon Survey	·	2.2 km	MPC · JPL
266390	2007 EG_{139}	—	March 12, 2007	Kitt Peak	Spacewatch	·	2.4 km	MPC · JPL
266391	2007 ET_{139}	—	March 12, 2007	Kitt Peak	Spacewatch	·	2.2 km	MPC · JPL
266392	2007 EK_{145}	—	March 12, 2007	Mount Lemmon	Mount Lemmon Survey	·	2.5 km	MPC · JPL
266393	2007 EN_{150}	—	March 12, 2007	Mount Lemmon	Mount Lemmon Survey	HOF	3.1 km	MPC · JPL
266394	2007 ED_{155}	—	March 12, 2007	Kitt Peak	Spacewatch	·	2.6 km	MPC · JPL
266395	2007 EL_{168}	—	March 13, 2007	Kitt Peak	Spacewatch	·	2.4 km	MPC · JPL
266396	2007 EL_{170}	—	March 15, 2007	Kitt Peak	Spacewatch	·	2.1 km	MPC · JPL
266397	2007 EE_{171}	—	March 11, 2007	Calvin-Rehoboth	Calvin College	·	1.3 km	MPC · JPL
266398	2007 EC_{183}	—	March 12, 2007	Mount Lemmon	Mount Lemmon Survey	(5)	1.5 km	MPC · JPL
266399	2007 EA_{187}	—	March 15, 2007	Mount Lemmon	Mount Lemmon Survey	·	2.4 km	MPC · JPL
266400	2007 EW_{187}	—	March 15, 2007	Catalina	CSS	·	2.0 km	MPC · JPL

== 266401–266500 ==
back to top

Designation			Discovery			Properties		Ref
Permanent	Provisional	Named after	Date	Site	Discoverer(s)	Category	Diam.	Ref
266401	2007 EO_{200}	—	March 14, 2007	Mount Lemmon	Mount Lemmon Survey	·	2.3 km	MPC · JPL
266402	2007 EF_{205}	—	March 11, 2007	Kitt Peak	Spacewatch	·	2.4 km	MPC · JPL
266403	2007 EK_{211}	—	March 8, 2007	Palomar	NEAT	·	1.9 km	MPC · JPL
266404	2007 EG_{219}	—	March 13, 2007	Kitt Peak	Spacewatch	·	3.9 km	MPC · JPL
266405	2007 EB_{223}	—	March 10, 2007	Palomar	NEAT	·	4.5 km	MPC · JPL
266406	2007 FQ_{2}	—	March 16, 2007	Catalina	CSS	·	2.2 km	MPC · JPL
266407	2007 FZ_{10}	—	March 16, 2007	Kitt Peak	Spacewatch	AGN	1.6 km	MPC · JPL
266408	2007 FR_{16}	—	March 20, 2007	Mount Lemmon	Mount Lemmon Survey	·	1 km	MPC · JPL
266409	2007 FE_{17}	—	March 20, 2007	Mount Lemmon	Mount Lemmon Survey	·	2.4 km	MPC · JPL
266410	2007 FO_{25}	—	March 20, 2007	Kitt Peak	Spacewatch	·	2.5 km	MPC · JPL
266411	2007 FP_{27}	—	March 20, 2007	Mount Lemmon	Mount Lemmon Survey	·	1.6 km	MPC · JPL
266412	2007 FB_{29}	—	March 20, 2007	Mount Lemmon	Mount Lemmon Survey	·	2.0 km	MPC · JPL
266413	2007 FJ_{31}	—	March 20, 2007	Mount Lemmon	Mount Lemmon Survey	·	1.9 km	MPC · JPL
266414	2007 FG_{38}	—	March 27, 2007	Siding Spring	SSS	ADE	4.7 km	MPC · JPL
266415	2007 FV_{38}	—	March 27, 2007	Siding Spring	SSS	·	2.6 km	MPC · JPL
266416	2007 FE_{39}	—	March 30, 2007	Palomar	NEAT	JUN	2.1 km	MPC · JPL
266417	2007 FX_{43}	—	March 16, 2007	Mount Lemmon	Mount Lemmon Survey	·	1.2 km	MPC · JPL
266418	2007 GM_{3}	—	April 8, 2007	Palomar	NEAT	·	3.3 km	MPC · JPL
266419	2007 GH_{4}	—	April 9, 2007	Bergisch Gladbach	W. Bickel	HOF	3.6 km	MPC · JPL
266420	2007 GL_{10}	—	April 11, 2007	Kitt Peak	Spacewatch	EUN	1.7 km	MPC · JPL
266421	2007 GG_{17}	—	April 11, 2007	Kitt Peak	Spacewatch	EOS	3.6 km	MPC · JPL
266422	2007 GH_{18}	—	April 11, 2007	Catalina	CSS	·	2.2 km	MPC · JPL
266423	2007 GG_{23}	—	April 11, 2007	Mount Lemmon	Mount Lemmon Survey	·	1.8 km	MPC · JPL
266424	2007 GR_{34}	—	April 14, 2007	Kitt Peak	Spacewatch	·	3.0 km	MPC · JPL
266425	2007 GS_{43}	—	April 14, 2007	Mount Lemmon	Mount Lemmon Survey	·	2.2 km	MPC · JPL
266426	2007 GT_{44}	—	April 14, 2007	Kitt Peak	Spacewatch	KOR	1.6 km	MPC · JPL
266427	2007 GM_{51}	—	April 11, 2007	Catalina	CSS	·	3.4 km	MPC · JPL
266428	2007 GM_{52}	—	April 14, 2007	Kitt Peak	Spacewatch	AGN	1.5 km	MPC · JPL
266429	2007 GQ_{58}	—	April 15, 2007	Mount Lemmon	Mount Lemmon Survey	WIT	1.3 km	MPC · JPL
266430	2007 GK_{59}	—	April 15, 2007	Kitt Peak	Spacewatch	KOR	1.6 km	MPC · JPL
266431	2007 GX_{66}	—	April 15, 2007	Kitt Peak	Spacewatch	KOR	2.1 km	MPC · JPL
266432	2007 GZ_{68}	—	April 15, 2007	Mount Lemmon	Mount Lemmon Survey	·	3.2 km	MPC · JPL
266433	2007 GM_{75}	—	April 15, 2007	Catalina	CSS	EUP	4.6 km	MPC · JPL
266434	2007 GN_{77}	—	April 15, 2007	Kitt Peak	Spacewatch	·	4.2 km	MPC · JPL
266435	2007 HF_{6}	—	April 16, 2007	Catalina	CSS	·	2.2 km	MPC · JPL
266436	2007 HY_{6}	—	April 16, 2007	Anderson Mesa	LONEOS	·	3.0 km	MPC · JPL
266437	2007 HG_{7}	—	April 16, 2007	Catalina	CSS	·	4.0 km	MPC · JPL
266438	2007 HZ_{23}	—	April 18, 2007	Kitt Peak	Spacewatch	·	2.9 km	MPC · JPL
266439	2007 HY_{26}	—	April 18, 2007	Kitt Peak	Spacewatch	·	3.8 km	MPC · JPL
266440	2007 HK_{36}	—	April 19, 2007	Kitt Peak	Spacewatch	·	1.9 km	MPC · JPL
266441	2007 HM_{49}	—	April 20, 2007	Kitt Peak	Spacewatch	HYG	3.8 km	MPC · JPL
266442	2007 HC_{65}	—	April 22, 2007	Mount Lemmon	Mount Lemmon Survey	HYG	3.1 km	MPC · JPL
266443	2007 HK_{70}	—	April 19, 2007	Mount Lemmon	Mount Lemmon Survey	·	2.5 km	MPC · JPL
266444	2007 HP_{81}	—	April 25, 2007	Mount Lemmon	Mount Lemmon Survey	·	2.3 km	MPC · JPL
266445	2007 HR_{82}	—	April 21, 2007	Lulin	LUSS	·	2.8 km	MPC · JPL
266446	2007 HR_{86}	—	April 24, 2007	Kitt Peak	Spacewatch	·	2.3 km	MPC · JPL
266447	2007 HU_{94}	—	April 26, 2007	Mount Lemmon	Mount Lemmon Survey	·	2.3 km	MPC · JPL
266448	2007 HV_{94}	—	April 23, 2007	Mount Lemmon	Mount Lemmon Survey	·	1.9 km	MPC · JPL
266449	2007 JE	—	May 7, 2007	Kitt Peak	Spacewatch	·	3.2 km	MPC · JPL
266450	2007 JH_{2}	—	May 7, 2007	Mount Lemmon	Mount Lemmon Survey	·	4.6 km	MPC · JPL
266451	2007 JK_{14}	—	May 10, 2007	Kitt Peak	Spacewatch	·	3.2 km	MPC · JPL
266452	2007 JT_{26}	—	May 9, 2007	Kitt Peak	Spacewatch	EOS ·	5.0 km	MPC · JPL
266453	2007 JR_{30}	—	May 11, 2007	Catalina	CSS	·	3.0 km	MPC · JPL
266454	2007 JQ_{33}	—	May 12, 2007	Mount Lemmon	Mount Lemmon Survey	·	4.2 km	MPC · JPL
266455	2007 JH_{42}	—	May 9, 2007	Mount Lemmon	Mount Lemmon Survey	·	7.3 km	MPC · JPL
266456	2007 KS_{2}	—	May 21, 2007	Tiki	S. F. Hönig, Teamo, N.	·	2.8 km	MPC · JPL
266457	2007 LB	—	June 5, 2007	Catalina	CSS	·	2.0 km	MPC · JPL
266458	2007 LN_{2}	—	June 8, 2007	Kitt Peak	Spacewatch	·	4.1 km	MPC · JPL
266459	2007 LA_{13}	—	June 9, 2007	Kitt Peak	Spacewatch	·	5.0 km	MPC · JPL
266460	2007 LS_{18}	—	June 8, 2007	Kitt Peak	Spacewatch	·	4.6 km	MPC · JPL
266461	2007 LV_{20}	—	June 11, 2007	Kitt Peak	Spacewatch	·	5.5 km	MPC · JPL
266462	2007 LO_{24}	—	June 14, 2007	Kitt Peak	Spacewatch	THM	2.7 km	MPC · JPL
266463	2007 LD_{36}	—	June 10, 2007	Kitt Peak	Spacewatch	EOS	2.4 km	MPC · JPL
266464	2007 LP_{36}	—	June 10, 2007	Kitt Peak	Spacewatch	·	3.8 km	MPC · JPL
266465 Andalucia	2007 OH	Andalucia	July 16, 2007	La Sagra	OAM	·	5.8 km	MPC · JPL
266466	2007 PZ_{17}	—	August 9, 2007	Socorro	LINEAR	·	5.2 km	MPC · JPL
266467	2007 RN_{12}	—	September 11, 2007	Siding Spring	SSS	·	900 m	MPC · JPL
266468	2007 RY_{145}	—	September 14, 2007	Socorro	LINEAR	H	680 m	MPC · JPL
266469	2007 VQ_{9}	—	November 3, 2007	Kitt Peak	Spacewatch	EUN	4.3 km	MPC · JPL
266470	2007 VJ_{326}	—	November 3, 2007	Mount Lemmon	Mount Lemmon Survey	·	820 m	MPC · JPL
266471	2007 YB_{1}	—	December 16, 2007	La Sagra	OAM	·	1.2 km	MPC · JPL
266472	2008 AT_{62}	—	January 11, 2008	Mount Lemmon	Mount Lemmon Survey	·	840 m	MPC · JPL
266473	2008 AT_{90}	—	January 13, 2008	Kitt Peak	Spacewatch	·	1.5 km	MPC · JPL
266474	2008 AH_{107}	—	January 15, 2008	Kitt Peak	Spacewatch	·	840 m	MPC · JPL
266475	2008 AE_{113}	—	January 1, 2008	Catalina	CSS	H	960 m	MPC · JPL
266476	2008 BS_{22}	—	January 31, 2008	Mount Lemmon	Mount Lemmon Survey	·	870 m	MPC · JPL
266477	2008 CX_{4}	—	February 3, 2008	Socorro	LINEAR	H	890 m	MPC · JPL
266478	2008 CA_{41}	—	February 2, 2008	Kitt Peak	Spacewatch	·	2.4 km	MPC · JPL
266479	2008 CM_{41}	—	February 2, 2008	Kitt Peak	Spacewatch	·	920 m	MPC · JPL
266480	2008 CS_{44}	—	February 2, 2008	Kitt Peak	Spacewatch	·	1.7 km	MPC · JPL
266481	2008 CB_{54}	—	February 7, 2008	Catalina	CSS	V	750 m	MPC · JPL
266482	2008 CV_{59}	—	February 7, 2008	Kitt Peak	Spacewatch	·	830 m	MPC · JPL
266483	2008 CM_{91}	—	February 8, 2008	Kitt Peak	Spacewatch	·	1.9 km	MPC · JPL
266484	2008 CP_{100}	—	February 9, 2008	Kitt Peak	Spacewatch	·	950 m	MPC · JPL
266485	2008 CH_{149}	—	February 9, 2008	Kitt Peak	Spacewatch	·	770 m	MPC · JPL
266486	2008 CC_{166}	—	February 10, 2008	Mount Lemmon	Mount Lemmon Survey	·	920 m	MPC · JPL
266487	2008 CE_{176}	—	February 6, 2008	Socorro	LINEAR	·	1.6 km	MPC · JPL
266488	2008 CF_{201}	—	February 13, 2008	Mount Lemmon	Mount Lemmon Survey	·	1.4 km	MPC · JPL
266489	2008 CU_{211}	—	February 6, 2008	Catalina	CSS	·	6.3 km	MPC · JPL
266490	2008 DF_{15}	—	February 26, 2008	Mount Lemmon	Mount Lemmon Survey	·	3.5 km	MPC · JPL
266491	2008 DL_{19}	—	February 27, 2008	Kitt Peak	Spacewatch	·	850 m	MPC · JPL
266492	2008 DY_{20}	—	February 28, 2008	Kitt Peak	Spacewatch	·	2.3 km	MPC · JPL
266493	2008 DG_{44}	—	February 28, 2008	Kitt Peak	Spacewatch	·	1.2 km	MPC · JPL
266494	2008 DY_{47}	—	February 28, 2008	Mount Lemmon	Mount Lemmon Survey	·	970 m	MPC · JPL
266495	2008 DC_{55}	—	February 26, 2008	Kitt Peak	Spacewatch	·	870 m	MPC · JPL
266496	2008 DU_{67}	—	February 29, 2008	Kitt Peak	Spacewatch	V	870 m	MPC · JPL
266497	2008 DO_{83}	—	February 28, 2008	Mount Lemmon	Mount Lemmon Survey	MAS	1.0 km	MPC · JPL
266498	2008 DF_{84}	—	February 18, 2008	Mount Lemmon	Mount Lemmon Survey	·	2.7 km	MPC · JPL
266499	2008 DS_{85}	—	February 28, 2008	Kitt Peak	Spacewatch	NYS	1.2 km	MPC · JPL
266500	2008 EH_{3}	—	September 28, 2003	Anderson Mesa	LONEOS	·	900 m	MPC · JPL

== 266501–266600 ==
back to top

Designation			Discovery			Properties		Ref
Permanent	Provisional	Named after	Date	Site	Discoverer(s)	Category	Diam.	Ref
266501	2008 EN_{11}	—	March 1, 2008	Kitt Peak	Spacewatch	·	1.6 km	MPC · JPL
266502	2008 ET_{15}	—	March 1, 2008	Kitt Peak	Spacewatch	·	860 m	MPC · JPL
266503	2008 ED_{18}	—	March 1, 2008	Kitt Peak	Spacewatch	·	1.2 km	MPC · JPL
266504	2008 EX_{20}	—	March 2, 2008	Kitt Peak	Spacewatch	·	750 m	MPC · JPL
266505	2008 EL_{40}	—	March 4, 2008	Kitt Peak	Spacewatch	·	2.1 km	MPC · JPL
266506	2008 EF_{41}	—	March 4, 2008	Kitt Peak	Spacewatch	·	1.2 km	MPC · JPL
266507	2008 EF_{42}	—	March 4, 2008	Kitt Peak	Spacewatch	·	880 m	MPC · JPL
266508	2008 EQ_{44}	—	March 5, 2008	Kitt Peak	Spacewatch	·	770 m	MPC · JPL
266509	2008 EM_{54}	—	March 6, 2008	Kitt Peak	Spacewatch	·	1.0 km	MPC · JPL
266510	2008 EU_{54}	—	March 6, 2008	Kitt Peak	Spacewatch	(2076)	1.3 km	MPC · JPL
266511	2008 EO_{64}	—	March 9, 2008	Mount Lemmon	Mount Lemmon Survey	·	3.3 km	MPC · JPL
266512	2008 EW_{72}	—	March 6, 2008	Mount Lemmon	Mount Lemmon Survey	·	2.0 km	MPC · JPL
266513	2008 EG_{75}	—	March 7, 2008	Kitt Peak	Spacewatch	·	650 m	MPC · JPL
266514	2008 EA_{77}	—	March 7, 2008	Kitt Peak	Spacewatch	·	620 m	MPC · JPL
266515	2008 ED_{120}	—	March 9, 2008	Kitt Peak	Spacewatch	·	870 m	MPC · JPL
266516	2008 EU_{137}	—	March 11, 2008	Kitt Peak	Spacewatch	·	1.7 km	MPC · JPL
266517	2008 EM_{140}	—	March 12, 2008	Kitt Peak	Spacewatch	·	1.4 km	MPC · JPL
266518	2008 EP_{148}	—	March 2, 2008	Kitt Peak	Spacewatch	·	1.5 km	MPC · JPL
266519	2008 EC_{151}	—	March 10, 2008	Kitt Peak	Spacewatch	·	730 m	MPC · JPL
266520	2008 ET_{152}	—	March 11, 2008	Kitt Peak	Spacewatch	·	720 m	MPC · JPL
266521	2008 ER_{165}	—	August 9, 2004	Siding Spring	SSS	·	3.1 km	MPC · JPL
266522	2008 EJ_{166}	—	March 5, 2008	Mount Lemmon	Mount Lemmon Survey	·	1.3 km	MPC · JPL
266523	2008 ER_{167}	—	March 9, 2008	Socorro	LINEAR	·	1.4 km	MPC · JPL
266524	2008 FX_{3}	—	March 25, 2008	Kitt Peak	Spacewatch	·	950 m	MPC · JPL
266525	2008 FN_{15}	—	March 26, 2008	Kitt Peak	Spacewatch	EUN	1.8 km	MPC · JPL
266526	2008 FX_{20}	—	March 27, 2008	Kitt Peak	Spacewatch	·	1.8 km	MPC · JPL
266527	2008 FE_{26}	—	March 27, 2008	Mount Lemmon	Mount Lemmon Survey	·	580 m	MPC · JPL
266528	2008 FQ_{26}	—	March 27, 2008	Kitt Peak	Spacewatch	·	1.0 km	MPC · JPL
266529	2008 FF_{27}	—	March 27, 2008	Kitt Peak	Spacewatch	·	1.3 km	MPC · JPL
266530	2008 FE_{30}	—	March 28, 2008	Kitt Peak	Spacewatch	·	770 m	MPC · JPL
266531	2008 FT_{44}	—	March 28, 2008	Mount Lemmon	Mount Lemmon Survey	·	1.5 km	MPC · JPL
266532	2008 FZ_{53}	—	March 28, 2008	Mount Lemmon	Mount Lemmon Survey	·	1.0 km	MPC · JPL
266533	2008 FP_{57}	—	March 28, 2008	Kitt Peak	Spacewatch	·	810 m	MPC · JPL
266534	2008 FR_{57}	—	March 28, 2008	Mount Lemmon	Mount Lemmon Survey	·	1.6 km	MPC · JPL
266535	2008 FV_{64}	—	March 28, 2008	Kitt Peak	Spacewatch	·	960 m	MPC · JPL
266536	2008 FN_{68}	—	March 28, 2008	Mount Lemmon	Mount Lemmon Survey	·	2.2 km	MPC · JPL
266537	2008 FP_{84}	—	March 28, 2008	Mount Lemmon	Mount Lemmon Survey	MAS	1.0 km	MPC · JPL
266538	2008 FY_{95}	—	March 29, 2008	Catalina	CSS	RAF	1.6 km	MPC · JPL
266539	2008 FG_{96}	—	March 29, 2008	Mount Lemmon	Mount Lemmon Survey	·	1.7 km	MPC · JPL
266540	2008 FS_{100}	—	March 30, 2008	Kitt Peak	Spacewatch	·	1.8 km	MPC · JPL
266541	2008 FA_{106}	—	March 31, 2008	Kitt Peak	Spacewatch	NYS	1.2 km	MPC · JPL
266542	2008 FT_{106}	—	March 31, 2008	Kitt Peak	Spacewatch	·	1.6 km	MPC · JPL
266543	2008 FZ_{112}	—	March 31, 2008	Kitt Peak	Spacewatch	·	1.9 km	MPC · JPL
266544	2008 FV_{118}	—	March 31, 2008	Mount Lemmon	Mount Lemmon Survey	·	910 m	MPC · JPL
266545	2008 FO_{123}	—	March 29, 2008	Kitt Peak	Spacewatch	V	940 m	MPC · JPL
266546	2008 FA_{124}	—	March 29, 2008	Kitt Peak	Spacewatch	·	1.7 km	MPC · JPL
266547	2008 FN_{129}	—	March 31, 2008	Kitt Peak	Spacewatch	·	790 m	MPC · JPL
266548	2008 FN_{132}	—	March 28, 2008	Kitt Peak	Spacewatch	·	2.0 km	MPC · JPL
266549	2008 FG_{134}	—	March 29, 2008	Mount Lemmon	Mount Lemmon Survey	NYS	1.5 km	MPC · JPL
266550	2008 GY_{5}	—	April 1, 2008	Kitt Peak	Spacewatch	V	1.1 km	MPC · JPL
266551	2008 GA_{15}	—	April 3, 2008	Mount Lemmon	Mount Lemmon Survey	·	1.2 km	MPC · JPL
266552	2008 GN_{20}	—	April 7, 2008	Mayhill	Dillon, W. G.	·	750 m	MPC · JPL
266553	2008 GX_{32}	—	April 3, 2008	Kitt Peak	Spacewatch	·	1.8 km	MPC · JPL
266554	2008 GU_{34}	—	April 3, 2008	Mount Lemmon	Mount Lemmon Survey	·	2.2 km	MPC · JPL
266555	2008 GX_{37}	—	April 3, 2008	Kitt Peak	Spacewatch	·	1.5 km	MPC · JPL
266556	2008 GB_{38}	—	April 3, 2008	Kitt Peak	Spacewatch	NYS	1.2 km	MPC · JPL
266557	2008 GF_{38}	—	April 3, 2008	Kitt Peak	Spacewatch	·	1.6 km	MPC · JPL
266558	2008 GR_{38}	—	April 3, 2008	Mount Lemmon	Mount Lemmon Survey	·	1.5 km	MPC · JPL
266559	2008 GU_{47}	—	April 4, 2008	Kitt Peak	Spacewatch	·	780 m	MPC · JPL
266560	2008 GN_{54}	—	April 5, 2008	Mount Lemmon	Mount Lemmon Survey	·	1.1 km	MPC · JPL
266561	2008 GR_{60}	—	April 5, 2008	Catalina	CSS	(2076)	1.0 km	MPC · JPL
266562	2008 GJ_{62}	—	April 5, 2008	Catalina	CSS	NYS	1.4 km	MPC · JPL
266563	2008 GD_{63}	—	April 5, 2008	Catalina	CSS	·	690 m	MPC · JPL
266564	2008 GX_{69}	—	April 6, 2008	Mount Lemmon	Mount Lemmon Survey	V	790 m	MPC · JPL
266565	2008 GZ_{76}	—	April 7, 2008	Kitt Peak	Spacewatch	·	1.1 km	MPC · JPL
266566	2008 GH_{105}	—	April 11, 2008	Kitt Peak	Spacewatch	·	860 m	MPC · JPL
266567	2008 GY_{115}	—	April 11, 2008	Kitt Peak	Spacewatch	·	1.3 km	MPC · JPL
266568	2008 GP_{120}	—	April 12, 2008	Catalina	CSS	·	1.4 km	MPC · JPL
266569	2008 GD_{122}	—	April 13, 2008	Kitt Peak	Spacewatch	·	1.4 km	MPC · JPL
266570	2008 GG_{129}	—	April 2, 2008	Kitt Peak	Spacewatch	·	1.1 km	MPC · JPL
266571	2008 GW_{129}	—	April 4, 2008	Mount Lemmon	Mount Lemmon Survey	·	1.3 km	MPC · JPL
266572	2008 GH_{132}	—	April 12, 2008	Kitt Peak	Spacewatch	·	900 m	MPC · JPL
266573	2008 HH_{1}	—	April 24, 2008	Kitt Peak	Spacewatch	·	1.8 km	MPC · JPL
266574	2008 HK_{3}	—	April 24, 2008	Andrushivka	Andrushivka	NYS	1.2 km	MPC · JPL
266575	2008 HT_{5}	—	April 24, 2008	Kitt Peak	Spacewatch	·	790 m	MPC · JPL
266576	2008 HO_{7}	—	April 24, 2008	Kitt Peak	Spacewatch	·	3.6 km	MPC · JPL
266577	2008 HQ_{11}	—	April 24, 2008	Kitt Peak	Spacewatch	·	1.2 km	MPC · JPL
266578	2008 HS_{11}	—	April 24, 2008	Catalina	CSS	RAF	1.3 km	MPC · JPL
266579	2008 HA_{14}	—	April 25, 2008	Kitt Peak	Spacewatch	NYS	1.3 km	MPC · JPL
266580	2008 HL_{18}	—	April 26, 2008	Kitt Peak	Spacewatch	·	1.9 km	MPC · JPL
266581	2008 HG_{20}	—	April 26, 2008	Mount Lemmon	Mount Lemmon Survey	·	5.1 km	MPC · JPL
266582	2008 HC_{25}	—	April 27, 2008	Kitt Peak	Spacewatch	CLA	1.8 km	MPC · JPL
266583	2008 HT_{28}	—	April 28, 2008	Kitt Peak	Spacewatch	NYS	2.0 km	MPC · JPL
266584	2008 HT_{33}	—	April 26, 2008	Kitt Peak	Spacewatch	·	1.5 km	MPC · JPL
266585	2008 HE_{35}	—	April 28, 2008	Kitt Peak	Spacewatch	·	1.7 km	MPC · JPL
266586	2008 HF_{47}	—	April 28, 2008	Kitt Peak	Spacewatch	V	960 m	MPC · JPL
266587	2008 HN_{49}	—	April 29, 2008	Mount Lemmon	Mount Lemmon Survey	·	1.6 km	MPC · JPL
266588	2008 HO_{55}	—	April 29, 2008	Kitt Peak	Spacewatch	·	5.4 km	MPC · JPL
266589	2008 HN_{61}	—	April 30, 2008	Mount Lemmon	Mount Lemmon Survey	·	1.8 km	MPC · JPL
266590	2008 HE_{65}	—	April 29, 2008	Mount Lemmon	Mount Lemmon Survey	·	2.3 km	MPC · JPL
266591	2008 HX_{68}	—	April 30, 2008	Kitt Peak	Spacewatch	T_{j} (2.99) · HIL · 3:2	6.1 km	MPC · JPL
266592	2008 HN_{70}	—	April 29, 2008	Socorro	LINEAR	·	1.3 km	MPC · JPL
266593	2008 JU	—	May 1, 2008	Catalina	CSS	·	1.0 km	MPC · JPL
266594	2008 JT_{4}	—	May 2, 2008	Catalina	CSS	·	1.9 km	MPC · JPL
266595	2008 JD_{10}	—	May 3, 2008	Kitt Peak	Spacewatch	·	1.2 km	MPC · JPL
266596	2008 JB_{13}	—	May 3, 2008	Kitt Peak	Spacewatch	·	1.4 km	MPC · JPL
266597	2008 JX_{14}	—	May 6, 2008	Dauban	Kugel, F.	V	680 m	MPC · JPL
266598	2008 JM_{25}	—	May 6, 2008	Kitt Peak	Spacewatch	·	2.1 km	MPC · JPL
266599	2008 JP_{25}	—	May 7, 2008	Kitt Peak	Spacewatch	MAS	830 m	MPC · JPL
266600	2008 JA_{26}	—	May 8, 2008	Mount Lemmon	Mount Lemmon Survey	·	1.0 km	MPC · JPL

== 266601–266700 ==
back to top

Designation			Discovery			Properties		Ref
Permanent	Provisional	Named after	Date	Site	Discoverer(s)	Category	Diam.	Ref
266601	2008 JV_{30}	—	May 14, 2008	Kitt Peak	Spacewatch	·	2.2 km	MPC · JPL
266602	2008 JH_{31}	—	May 5, 2008	Mount Lemmon	Mount Lemmon Survey	·	1.3 km	MPC · JPL
266603	2008 JC_{37}	—	May 13, 2008	Mount Lemmon	Mount Lemmon Survey	MAS	880 m	MPC · JPL
266604	2008 KA_{8}	—	May 27, 2008	Kitt Peak	Spacewatch	·	1.3 km	MPC · JPL
266605	2008 KV_{20}	—	May 28, 2008	Mount Lemmon	Mount Lemmon Survey	·	1.9 km	MPC · JPL
266606	2008 KR_{38}	—	May 30, 2008	Kitt Peak	Spacewatch	·	1.6 km	MPC · JPL
266607	2008 LV_{15}	—	June 10, 2008	Kitt Peak	Spacewatch	V	650 m	MPC · JPL
266608	2008 LT_{16}	—	June 14, 2008	Eskridge	G. Hug	·	1.8 km	MPC · JPL
266609	2008 MR	—	June 26, 2008	La Sagra	OAM	·	1.9 km	MPC · JPL
266610	2008 OK_{3}	—	July 27, 2008	Bisei SG Center	BATTeRS	MRX	1.5 km	MPC · JPL
266611	2008 OK_{9}	—	July 29, 2008	La Sagra	OAM	·	5.1 km	MPC · JPL
266612	2008 OQ_{9}	—	July 29, 2008	La Sagra	OAM	THM	4.0 km	MPC · JPL
266613	2008 OQ_{10}	—	July 31, 2008	Hibiscus	S. F. Hönig, Teamo, N.	·	2.3 km	MPC · JPL
266614	2008 OV_{10}	—	July 30, 2008	Reedy Creek	J. Broughton	TIR	4.4 km	MPC · JPL
266615	2008 OD_{12}	—	July 25, 2008	La Sagra	OAM	·	4.1 km	MPC · JPL
266616	2008 OZ_{17}	—	July 30, 2008	Kitt Peak	Spacewatch	EOS	2.7 km	MPC · JPL
266617	2008 OX_{23}	—	July 30, 2008	Kitt Peak	Spacewatch	EUN	1.8 km	MPC · JPL
266618	2008 PF_{4}	—	August 3, 2008	Pla D'Arguines	R. Ferrando	·	4.3 km	MPC · JPL
266619	2008 PC_{6}	—	August 4, 2008	La Sagra	OAM	·	3.3 km	MPC · JPL
266620	2008 PS_{13}	—	August 10, 2008	Dauban	Kugel, F.	·	4.8 km	MPC · JPL
266621	2008 PY_{16}	—	August 7, 2008	Tiki	Teamo, N.	·	1.7 km	MPC · JPL
266622 Málna	2008 QO_{3}	Málna	August 24, 2008	Piszkéstető	K. Sárneczky	·	2.9 km	MPC · JPL
266623	2008 QF_{5}	—	August 22, 2008	Kitt Peak	Spacewatch	·	2.6 km	MPC · JPL
266624	2008 QH_{8}	—	August 25, 2008	La Sagra	OAM	·	4.3 km	MPC · JPL
266625	2008 QL_{10}	—	August 26, 2008	La Sagra	OAM	·	3.6 km	MPC · JPL
266626	2008 QP_{21}	—	August 26, 2008	Socorro	LINEAR	·	5.1 km	MPC · JPL
266627	2008 QL_{26}	—	August 29, 2008	La Sagra	OAM	·	2.2 km	MPC · JPL
266628	2008 QT_{30}	—	August 30, 2008	Socorro	LINEAR	CYB	5.1 km	MPC · JPL
266629	2008 QL_{47}	—	August 23, 2008	Kitt Peak	Spacewatch	·	3.4 km	MPC · JPL
266630	2008 RX_{5}	—	September 2, 2008	Kitt Peak	Spacewatch	·	3.0 km	MPC · JPL
266631	2008 RC_{73}	—	September 6, 2008	Mount Lemmon	Mount Lemmon Survey	·	2.1 km	MPC · JPL
266632	2008 RE_{73}	—	September 6, 2008	Mount Lemmon	Mount Lemmon Survey	·	1.7 km	MPC · JPL
266633	2008 RB_{78}	—	September 9, 2008	Bisei SG Center	BATTeRS	EOS	3.5 km	MPC · JPL
266634	2008 RH_{82}	—	September 4, 2008	Kitt Peak	Spacewatch	·	3.8 km	MPC · JPL
266635	2008 RS_{82}	—	September 4, 2008	Kitt Peak	Spacewatch	·	4.4 km	MPC · JPL
266636	2008 RV_{95}	—	September 7, 2008	Catalina	CSS	HYG	3.0 km	MPC · JPL
266637	2008 RN_{99}	—	September 2, 2008	Kitt Peak	Spacewatch	·	2.7 km	MPC · JPL
266638	2008 RQ_{115}	—	September 7, 2008	Mount Lemmon	Mount Lemmon Survey	AEO	1.5 km	MPC · JPL
266639	2008 RL_{127}	—	September 6, 2008	Kitt Peak	Spacewatch	·	2.7 km	MPC · JPL
266640	2008 RY_{135}	—	September 4, 2008	Kitt Peak	Spacewatch	·	4.0 km	MPC · JPL
266641	2008 SH_{14}	—	September 19, 2008	Kitt Peak	Spacewatch	HYG	3.7 km	MPC · JPL
266642	2008 SE_{16}	—	September 19, 2008	Kitt Peak	Spacewatch	·	2.4 km	MPC · JPL
266643	2008 SF_{62}	—	September 21, 2008	Kitt Peak	Spacewatch	CYB	4.2 km	MPC · JPL
266644	2008 SP_{143}	—	September 24, 2008	Mount Lemmon	Mount Lemmon Survey	L4	9.4 km	MPC · JPL
266645	2008 SS_{202}	—	September 26, 2008	Kitt Peak	Spacewatch	·	3.1 km	MPC · JPL
266646 Zaphod	2008 SD_{209}	Zaphod	September 28, 2008	Charleston	Astronomical Research Observatory	·	2.7 km	MPC · JPL
266647	2008 SH_{229}	—	September 28, 2008	Mount Lemmon	Mount Lemmon Survey	L4 · ERY	11 km	MPC · JPL
266648	2008 SX_{260}	—	September 23, 2008	Mount Lemmon	Mount Lemmon Survey	L4	10 km	MPC · JPL
266649	2008 SG_{287}	—	September 23, 2008	Kitt Peak	Spacewatch	3:2	7.4 km	MPC · JPL
266650	2008 TS_{1}	—	October 2, 2008	Socorro	LINEAR	EUP	6.0 km	MPC · JPL
266651	2008 TY_{4}	—	October 1, 2008	La Sagra	OAM	·	3.1 km	MPC · JPL
266652	2008 TA_{30}	—	October 1, 2008	Mount Lemmon	Mount Lemmon Survey	·	3.5 km	MPC · JPL
266653	2008 TS_{30}	—	October 1, 2008	Kitt Peak	Spacewatch	fast?	4.0 km	MPC · JPL
266654	2008 TL_{87}	—	October 3, 2008	Kitt Peak	Spacewatch	·	3.9 km	MPC · JPL
266655	2008 TT_{121}	—	October 7, 2008	Catalina	CSS	CYB	5.7 km	MPC · JPL
266656	2008 TG_{142}	—	October 9, 2008	Mount Lemmon	Mount Lemmon Survey	L4	10 km	MPC · JPL
266657	2008 TA_{168}	—	October 1, 2008	Catalina	CSS	·	6.0 km	MPC · JPL
266658	2008 TZ_{180}	—	October 9, 2008	Catalina	CSS	EOS	3.0 km	MPC · JPL
266659	2008 TR_{181}	—	October 1, 2008	Kitt Peak	Spacewatch	THM	2.8 km	MPC · JPL
266660	2008 UF_{82}	—	October 22, 2008	Mount Lemmon	Mount Lemmon Survey	·	4.1 km	MPC · JPL
266661	2008 UV_{192}	—	October 25, 2008	Mount Lemmon	Mount Lemmon Survey	·	2.4 km	MPC · JPL
266662	2008 UJ_{209}	—	October 23, 2008	Kitt Peak	Spacewatch	L4	6.5 km	MPC · JPL
266663	2008 UH_{223}	—	October 25, 2008	Kitt Peak	Spacewatch	·	880 m	MPC · JPL
266664	2008 VG_{54}	—	November 6, 2008	Kitt Peak	Spacewatch	EMA	5.6 km	MPC · JPL
266665	2008 VG_{76}	—	November 1, 2008	Mount Lemmon	Mount Lemmon Survey	·	930 m	MPC · JPL
266666	2008 VH_{77}	—	November 3, 2008	Mount Lemmon	Mount Lemmon Survey	·	5.1 km	MPC · JPL
266667	2008 WS_{117}	—	November 30, 2008	Mount Lemmon	Mount Lemmon Survey	·	990 m	MPC · JPL
266668	2008 WO_{136}	—	November 20, 2008	Socorro	LINEAR	·	1.7 km	MPC · JPL
266669	2008 XR_{11}	—	December 1, 2008	Catalina	CSS	·	3.5 km	MPC · JPL
266670	2008 YZ_{109}	—	December 30, 2008	Mount Lemmon	Mount Lemmon Survey	·	3.1 km	MPC · JPL
266671	2008 YZ_{111}	—	December 31, 2008	Kitt Peak	Spacewatch	·	2.3 km	MPC · JPL
266672	2008 YD_{168}	—	December 22, 2008	Catalina	CSS	·	2.3 km	MPC · JPL
266673	2008 YY_{170}	—	December 31, 2008	Kitt Peak	Spacewatch	·	5.6 km	MPC · JPL
266674	2009 AN_{10}	—	January 2, 2009	Mount Lemmon	Mount Lemmon Survey	·	2.7 km	MPC · JPL
266675	2009 BD_{94}	—	January 25, 2009	Kitt Peak	Spacewatch	EOS	4.5 km	MPC · JPL
266676	2009 FV_{56}	—	March 24, 2009	Catalina	CSS	H	950 m	MPC · JPL
266677	2009 HG_{71}	—	April 22, 2009	Mount Lemmon	Mount Lemmon Survey	·	760 m	MPC · JPL
266678	2009 HU_{82}	—	April 24, 2009	Mount Lemmon	Mount Lemmon Survey	T_{j} (2.99)	5.9 km	MPC · JPL
266679	2009 KV_{4}	—	May 22, 2009	Hibiscus	Teamo, N.	RAF	1.3 km	MPC · JPL
266680	2009 MV_{6}	—	June 23, 2009	Mount Lemmon	Mount Lemmon Survey	H	790 m	MPC · JPL
266681	2009 OO_{2}	—	July 17, 2009	La Sagra	OAM	·	830 m	MPC · JPL
266682	2009 OK_{10}	—	July 30, 2009	Kitt Peak	Spacewatch	H	770 m	MPC · JPL
266683	2009 OB_{12}	—	July 27, 2009	Kitt Peak	Spacewatch	·	1.9 km	MPC · JPL
266684	2009 OQ_{13}	—	July 27, 2009	Kitt Peak	Spacewatch	·	710 m	MPC · JPL
266685	2009 OL_{15}	—	July 28, 2009	Kitt Peak	Spacewatch	AGN	1.5 km	MPC · JPL
266686	2009 OM_{20}	—	July 29, 2009	La Sagra	OAM	·	2.0 km	MPC · JPL
266687	2009 OL_{21}	—	July 26, 2009	La Sagra	OAM	NYS	1.5 km	MPC · JPL
266688	2009 OH_{23}	—	July 20, 2009	Siding Spring	SSS	·	1.1 km	MPC · JPL
266689	2009 OB_{24}	—	July 31, 2009	Kitt Peak	Spacewatch	·	1.3 km	MPC · JPL
266690	2009 OP_{24}	—	July 20, 2009	Siding Spring	SSS	GEF	1.6 km	MPC · JPL
266691	2009 PB	—	August 1, 2009	Skylive	Tozzi, F.	·	2.6 km	MPC · JPL
266692	2009 PJ_{1}	—	August 14, 2009	Dauban	Kugel, F.	NYS	1.4 km	MPC · JPL
266693	2009 PT_{11}	—	August 15, 2009	Catalina	CSS	·	1.9 km	MPC · JPL
266694	2009 PY_{11}	—	August 15, 2009	Catalina	CSS	·	1.4 km	MPC · JPL
266695	2009 PS_{17}	—	August 10, 2009	Kitt Peak	Spacewatch	·	5.2 km	MPC · JPL
266696	2009 PU_{19}	—	August 15, 2009	Kitt Peak	Spacewatch	·	2.3 km	MPC · JPL
266697	2009 PD_{20}	—	August 15, 2009	Kitt Peak	Spacewatch	·	2.0 km	MPC · JPL
266698	2009 PF_{20}	—	August 15, 2009	Kitt Peak	Spacewatch	·	2.5 km	MPC · JPL
266699	2009 PT_{20}	—	August 15, 2009	Socorro	LINEAR	·	2.2 km	MPC · JPL
266700	2009 PD_{21}	—	August 15, 2009	Kitt Peak	Spacewatch	·	2.9 km	MPC · JPL

== 266701–266800 ==
back to top

Designation			Discovery			Properties		Ref
Permanent	Provisional	Named after	Date	Site	Discoverer(s)	Category	Diam.	Ref
266701	2009 QL_{7}	—	August 17, 2009	Catalina	CSS	·	4.4 km	MPC · JPL
266702	2009 QG_{9}	—	August 19, 2009	Socorro	LINEAR	·	980 m	MPC · JPL
266703	2009 QG_{19}	—	August 18, 2009	Bergisch Gladbach	W. Bickel	MRX	1.1 km	MPC · JPL
266704	2009 QW_{19}	—	August 19, 2009	La Sagra	OAM	·	1.3 km	MPC · JPL
266705	2009 QZ_{21}	—	August 20, 2009	La Sagra	OAM	·	1.7 km	MPC · JPL
266706	2009 QL_{27}	—	August 21, 2009	Dauban	Kugel, F.	·	1.2 km	MPC · JPL
266707	2009 QD_{30}	—	August 24, 2009	Farra d'Isonzo	Farra d'Isonzo	·	4.3 km	MPC · JPL
266708	2009 QE_{31}	—	August 24, 2009	La Sagra	OAM	·	5.1 km	MPC · JPL
266709	2009 QZ_{32}	—	August 26, 2009	Catalina	CSS	·	4.6 km	MPC · JPL
266710 Pedrettiadriana	2009 QH_{37}	Pedrettiadriana	August 31, 2009	Haleakala	M. Micheli	·	3.1 km	MPC · JPL
266711 Tuttlingen	2009 QX_{38}	Tuttlingen	August 30, 2009	Taunus	R. Kling, Zimmer, U.	·	1.1 km	MPC · JPL
266712	2009 QA_{47}	—	August 28, 2009	La Sagra	OAM	·	2.2 km	MPC · JPL
266713	2009 QL_{47}	—	August 28, 2009	La Sagra	OAM	·	1.9 km	MPC · JPL
266714	2009 QT_{47}	—	August 28, 2009	La Sagra	OAM	AGN	1.8 km	MPC · JPL
266715	2009 QT_{51}	—	August 29, 2009	La Sagra	OAM	(5)	1.2 km	MPC · JPL
266716	2009 QQ_{53}	—	August 16, 2009	Kitt Peak	Spacewatch	KOR	1.6 km	MPC · JPL
266717	2009 QK_{55}	—	August 29, 2009	Kitt Peak	Spacewatch	·	1.5 km	MPC · JPL
266718	2009 QC_{57}	—	August 19, 2009	Kitt Peak	Spacewatch	·	1.5 km	MPC · JPL
266719	2009 QW_{62}	—	August 27, 2009	Kitt Peak	Spacewatch	·	2.9 km	MPC · JPL
266720	2009 RJ	—	September 9, 2009	La Sagra	OAM	·	1.5 km	MPC · JPL
266721	2009 RX_{6}	—	September 10, 2009	Catalina	CSS	·	1.7 km	MPC · JPL
266722	2009 RL_{12}	—	September 12, 2009	Kitt Peak	Spacewatch	HYG	3.8 km	MPC · JPL
266723	2009 RE_{14}	—	September 12, 2009	Kitt Peak	Spacewatch	KOR	1.5 km	MPC · JPL
266724	2009 RN_{18}	—	September 12, 2009	Kitt Peak	Spacewatch	·	1.2 km	MPC · JPL
266725 Vonputtkamer	2009 RU_{26}	Vonputtkamer	September 13, 2009	ESA OGS	Busch, M., Kresken, R.	·	920 m	MPC · JPL
266726	2009 RM_{31}	—	September 14, 2009	Kitt Peak	Spacewatch	·	3.0 km	MPC · JPL
266727	2009 RX_{31}	—	September 14, 2009	Kitt Peak	Spacewatch	·	1.5 km	MPC · JPL
266728	2009 RG_{32}	—	September 14, 2009	Kitt Peak	Spacewatch	·	2.5 km	MPC · JPL
266729	2009 RN_{34}	—	September 14, 2009	Kitt Peak	Spacewatch	·	2.3 km	MPC · JPL
266730	2009 RC_{49}	—	September 15, 2009	Kitt Peak	Spacewatch	·	1.9 km	MPC · JPL
266731	2009 RN_{59}	—	September 15, 2009	Kitt Peak	Spacewatch	·	2.6 km	MPC · JPL
266732	2009 RV_{60}	—	September 14, 2009	Catalina	CSS	·	2.7 km	MPC · JPL
266733	2009 RO_{68}	—	September 15, 2009	Kitt Peak	Spacewatch	THM	3.4 km	MPC · JPL
266734	2009 SO	—	September 16, 2009	Great Shefford	Birtwhistle, P.	ERI	2.0 km	MPC · JPL
266735	2009 SH_{3}	—	September 16, 2009	Kitt Peak	Spacewatch	·	2.6 km	MPC · JPL
266736	2009 SU_{3}	—	September 16, 2009	Kitt Peak	Spacewatch	L4	9.4 km	MPC · JPL
266737	2009 SQ_{21}	—	September 22, 2009	Bergisch Gladbach	W. Bickel	V	810 m	MPC · JPL
266738	2009 SA_{25}	—	September 16, 2009	Kitt Peak	Spacewatch	MRX	1.4 km	MPC · JPL
266739	2009 SN_{31}	—	September 16, 2009	Kitt Peak	Spacewatch	·	1.3 km	MPC · JPL
266740	2009 ST_{33}	—	September 16, 2009	Kitt Peak	Spacewatch	(5)	1.2 km	MPC · JPL
266741	2009 SF_{43}	—	September 16, 2009	Kitt Peak	Spacewatch	·	3.3 km	MPC · JPL
266742	2009 SJ_{43}	—	September 16, 2009	Kitt Peak	Spacewatch	NEM	2.4 km	MPC · JPL
266743	2009 SV_{47}	—	September 16, 2009	Kitt Peak	Spacewatch	·	3.6 km	MPC · JPL
266744	2009 SE_{50}	—	September 17, 2009	Kitt Peak	Spacewatch	·	2.8 km	MPC · JPL
266745	2009 SS_{50}	—	September 17, 2009	Kitt Peak	Spacewatch	·	1.4 km	MPC · JPL
266746	2009 SF_{52}	—	September 17, 2009	Kitt Peak	Spacewatch	·	1.8 km	MPC · JPL
266747	2009 SH_{60}	—	September 17, 2009	Kitt Peak	Spacewatch	·	2.8 km	MPC · JPL
266748	2009 SS_{60}	—	September 17, 2009	Kitt Peak	Spacewatch	GEF	1.7 km	MPC · JPL
266749	2009 SQ_{62}	—	September 17, 2009	Mount Lemmon	Mount Lemmon Survey	·	1.3 km	MPC · JPL
266750	2009 SU_{65}	—	September 17, 2009	Kitt Peak	Spacewatch	THM	2.4 km	MPC · JPL
266751	2009 SD_{69}	—	September 17, 2009	Kitt Peak	Spacewatch	·	3.4 km	MPC · JPL
266752	2009 SJ_{70}	—	September 17, 2009	Kitt Peak	Spacewatch	·	1.6 km	MPC · JPL
266753	2009 SL_{76}	—	September 17, 2009	Kitt Peak	Spacewatch	·	2.7 km	MPC · JPL
266754	2009 SA_{77}	—	September 17, 2009	Kitt Peak	Spacewatch	HYG	3.2 km	MPC · JPL
266755	2009 SK_{84}	—	December 25, 2005	Kitt Peak	Spacewatch	THM	2.6 km	MPC · JPL
266756	2009 SN_{87}	—	September 18, 2009	Mount Lemmon	Mount Lemmon Survey	·	1.3 km	MPC · JPL
266757	2009 SS_{87}	—	September 18, 2009	Kitt Peak	Spacewatch	·	1.7 km	MPC · JPL
266758	2009 SV_{102}	—	September 24, 2009	Mayhill	Lowe, A.	·	1.7 km	MPC · JPL
266759	2009 SE_{103}	—	September 25, 2009	Mayhill	Lowe, A.	V	830 m	MPC · JPL
266760	2009 SO_{110}	—	September 17, 2009	Mount Lemmon	Mount Lemmon Survey	MRX	1.3 km	MPC · JPL
266761	2009 SY_{116}	—	September 18, 2009	Kitt Peak	Spacewatch	·	3.3 km	MPC · JPL
266762	2009 SF_{122}	—	September 18, 2009	Kitt Peak	Spacewatch	·	1.2 km	MPC · JPL
266763	2009 SN_{129}	—	September 18, 2009	Kitt Peak	Spacewatch	·	1.9 km	MPC · JPL
266764	2009 SV_{129}	—	September 18, 2009	Kitt Peak	Spacewatch	KOR	1.6 km	MPC · JPL
266765	2009 SH_{133}	—	September 18, 2009	Kitt Peak	Spacewatch	NYS	1.5 km	MPC · JPL
266766	2009 SA_{134}	—	September 18, 2009	Kitt Peak	Spacewatch	·	2.1 km	MPC · JPL
266767	2009 SS_{137}	—	September 18, 2009	Kitt Peak	Spacewatch	·	1.3 km	MPC · JPL
266768	2009 SK_{138}	—	September 18, 2009	Kitt Peak	Spacewatch	·	3.0 km	MPC · JPL
266769	2009 SG_{158}	—	September 20, 2009	Kitt Peak	Spacewatch	HOF	3.0 km	MPC · JPL
266770	2009 SE_{165}	—	September 22, 2009	La Sagra	OAM	EOS	2.9 km	MPC · JPL
266771	2009 SN_{169}	—	September 24, 2009	Bergisch Gladbach	W. Bickel	V	770 m	MPC · JPL
266772	2009 SW_{172}	—	February 13, 2002	Apache Point	SDSS	L4	9.8 km	MPC · JPL
266773	2009 SC_{188}	—	September 21, 2009	Kitt Peak	Spacewatch	·	3.0 km	MPC · JPL
266774	2009 ST_{196}	—	September 22, 2009	Kitt Peak	Spacewatch	·	4.6 km	MPC · JPL
266775	2009 SZ_{198}	—	September 22, 2009	Kitt Peak	Spacewatch	·	2.5 km	MPC · JPL
266776	2009 SF_{203}	—	September 22, 2009	Kitt Peak	Spacewatch	·	1.9 km	MPC · JPL
266777	2009 SU_{210}	—	September 23, 2009	Kitt Peak	Spacewatch	·	1.9 km	MPC · JPL
266778	2009 SV_{213}	—	September 23, 2009	Kitt Peak	Spacewatch	·	1.6 km	MPC · JPL
266779	2009 SO_{217}	—	March 13, 2002	Kitt Peak	Spacewatch	L4	10 km	MPC · JPL
266780	2009 SB_{218}	—	September 24, 2009	Mount Lemmon	Mount Lemmon Survey	·	1.9 km	MPC · JPL
266781	2009 SR_{237}	—	September 16, 2009	Catalina	CSS	TIR	4.8 km	MPC · JPL
266782	2009 SK_{238}	—	September 16, 2009	Catalina	CSS	·	1.9 km	MPC · JPL
266783	2009 SN_{241}	—	September 18, 2009	Catalina	CSS	·	2.6 km	MPC · JPL
266784	2009 SU_{244}	—	September 17, 2009	Kitt Peak	Spacewatch	·	1.7 km	MPC · JPL
266785	2009 SC_{251}	—	September 20, 2009	Kitt Peak	Spacewatch	·	2.9 km	MPC · JPL
266786	2009 SE_{253}	—	September 22, 2009	Kitt Peak	Spacewatch	·	2.0 km	MPC · JPL
266787	2009 SJ_{260}	—	September 22, 2009	Mount Lemmon	Mount Lemmon Survey	·	2.8 km	MPC · JPL
266788	2009 SN_{264}	—	September 23, 2009	Mount Lemmon	Mount Lemmon Survey	3:2	7.8 km	MPC · JPL
266789	2009 SC_{268}	—	October 9, 2004	Kitt Peak	Spacewatch	·	3.2 km	MPC · JPL
266790	2009 SR_{268}	—	September 24, 2009	Kitt Peak	Spacewatch	·	2.3 km	MPC · JPL
266791	2009 SA_{271}	—	September 24, 2009	Kitt Peak	Spacewatch	L4	11 km	MPC · JPL
266792	2009 SO_{274}	—	September 25, 2009	Kitt Peak	Spacewatch	·	2.5 km	MPC · JPL
266793	2009 SQ_{277}	—	September 25, 2009	Kitt Peak	Spacewatch	·	4.3 km	MPC · JPL
266794	2009 SK_{302}	—	September 16, 2009	Catalina	CSS	·	1.7 km	MPC · JPL
266795	2009 SL_{307}	—	September 17, 2009	Kitt Peak	Spacewatch	·	4.0 km	MPC · JPL
266796	2009 SW_{313}	—	September 18, 2009	Kitt Peak	Spacewatch	KOR	1.5 km	MPC · JPL
266797	2009 SG_{316}	—	September 19, 2009	Kitt Peak	Spacewatch	MRX	1.1 km	MPC · JPL
266798	2009 SJ_{328}	—	September 26, 2009	Kitt Peak	Spacewatch	·	1.9 km	MPC · JPL
266799	2009 SG_{338}	—	September 27, 2009	Kitt Peak	Spacewatch	·	1.9 km	MPC · JPL
266800	2009 SM_{338}	—	September 22, 2009	Mount Lemmon	Mount Lemmon Survey	EMA	5.7 km	MPC · JPL

== 266801–266900 ==
back to top

Designation			Discovery			Properties		Ref
Permanent	Provisional	Named after	Date	Site	Discoverer(s)	Category	Diam.	Ref
266801	2009 SR_{338}	—	September 18, 2009	Catalina	CSS	·	3.9 km	MPC · JPL
266802	2009 SV_{339}	—	September 22, 2009	Mount Lemmon	Mount Lemmon Survey	·	2.9 km	MPC · JPL
266803	2009 SW_{342}	—	September 17, 2009	Kitt Peak	Spacewatch	KOR	1.7 km	MPC · JPL
266804	2009 SO_{343}	—	September 17, 2009	Kitt Peak	Spacewatch	·	2.3 km	MPC · JPL
266805	2009 SN_{350}	—	September 26, 2009	Kitt Peak	Spacewatch	·	4.0 km	MPC · JPL
266806	2009 SF_{352}	—	September 29, 2009	Mount Lemmon	Mount Lemmon Survey	CYB	4.0 km	MPC · JPL
266807	2009 SQ_{353}	—	September 18, 2009	Mount Lemmon	Mount Lemmon Survey	·	1.6 km	MPC · JPL
266808	2009 SN_{355}	—	October 12, 1998	Kitt Peak	Spacewatch	L4 · ERY	9.4 km	MPC · JPL
266809	2009 SJ_{359}	—	September 22, 2009	Kitt Peak	Spacewatch	·	2.5 km	MPC · JPL
266810	2009 SN_{359}	—	September 23, 2009	Kitt Peak	Spacewatch	·	2.1 km	MPC · JPL
266811	2009 ST_{359}	—	September 25, 2009	Kitt Peak	Spacewatch	HYG	3.8 km	MPC · JPL
266812	2009 SL_{361}	—	September 18, 2009	Catalina	CSS	EOS	3.0 km	MPC · JPL
266813	2009 SW_{363}	—	September 24, 2009	Mount Lemmon	Mount Lemmon Survey	L4	10 km	MPC · JPL
266814	2009 TX_{2}	—	October 13, 2009	Mayhill	Lowe, A.	EOS	2.3 km	MPC · JPL
266815	2009 TR_{5}	—	October 11, 2009	Mount Lemmon	Mount Lemmon Survey	THM	4.6 km	MPC · JPL
266816	2009 TO_{6}	—	October 12, 2009	La Sagra	OAM	·	2.1 km	MPC · JPL
266817	2009 TU_{10}	—	October 11, 2009	Mount Lemmon	Mount Lemmon Survey	·	3.4 km	MPC · JPL
266818	2009 TD_{11}	—	October 12, 2009	La Sagra	OAM	·	3.8 km	MPC · JPL
266819	2009 TQ_{11}	—	October 14, 2009	Bergisch Gladbach	W. Bickel	·	4.0 km	MPC · JPL
266820	2009 TQ_{21}	—	October 12, 2009	La Sagra	OAM	·	3.8 km	MPC · JPL
266821	2009 TK_{22}	—	October 13, 2009	La Sagra	OAM	·	2.4 km	MPC · JPL
266822	2009 TD_{24}	—	October 8, 2004	Kitt Peak	Spacewatch	·	2.6 km	MPC · JPL
266823	2009 TJ_{26}	—	October 14, 2009	La Sagra	OAM	·	3.7 km	MPC · JPL
266824	2009 TX_{27}	—	October 15, 2009	La Sagra	OAM	·	2.9 km	MPC · JPL
266825	2009 TP_{34}	—	October 12, 2009	La Sagra	OAM	·	4.3 km	MPC · JPL
266826	2009 TX_{35}	—	October 14, 2009	Catalina	CSS	·	2.9 km	MPC · JPL
266827	2009 TS_{36}	—	October 15, 2009	Bergisch Gladbach	W. Bickel	AGN	1.8 km	MPC · JPL
266828	2009 TP_{37}	—	October 8, 2009	La Sagra	OAM	·	2.0 km	MPC · JPL
266829	2009 TF_{39}	—	October 15, 2009	Catalina	CSS	·	3.5 km	MPC · JPL
266830	2009 TM_{41}	—	October 15, 2009	Catalina	CSS	EOS	3.3 km	MPC · JPL
266831	2009 UW_{3}	—	October 18, 2009	Taunus	Karge, S., R. Kling	·	2.3 km	MPC · JPL
266832	2009 UF_{4}	—	October 17, 2009	Bisei SG Center	BATTeRS	·	2.0 km	MPC · JPL
266833	2009 UY_{13}	—	October 19, 2009	Socorro	LINEAR	·	1.1 km	MPC · JPL
266834	2009 UJ_{15}	—	October 16, 2009	Mount Lemmon	Mount Lemmon Survey	HYG	3.3 km	MPC · JPL
266835	2009 UP_{17}	—	October 20, 2009	Bisei SG Center	BATTeRS	·	2.9 km	MPC · JPL
266836	2009 UK_{18}	—	October 20, 2009	Tzec Maun	Sachs, J.	·	4.7 km	MPC · JPL
266837	2009 UQ_{19}	—	October 24, 2009	Farra d'Isonzo	Farra d'Isonzo	LIX	4.8 km	MPC · JPL
266838	2009 UW_{21}	—	October 16, 2009	Catalina	CSS	·	1.5 km	MPC · JPL
266839	2009 UV_{22}	—	October 17, 2009	Mount Lemmon	Mount Lemmon Survey	·	4.2 km	MPC · JPL
266840	2009 UN_{24}	—	October 18, 2009	Mount Lemmon	Mount Lemmon Survey	·	2.0 km	MPC · JPL
266841	2009 UA_{27}	—	October 21, 2009	Mount Lemmon	Mount Lemmon Survey	AGN	1.4 km	MPC · JPL
266842	2009 UZ_{29}	—	October 18, 2009	Mount Lemmon	Mount Lemmon Survey	KOR	1.7 km	MPC · JPL
266843	2009 UY_{32}	—	October 18, 2009	Mount Lemmon	Mount Lemmon Survey	·	3.2 km	MPC · JPL
266844	2009 UL_{33}	—	October 18, 2009	Mount Lemmon	Mount Lemmon Survey	·	5.2 km	MPC · JPL
266845	2009 UW_{43}	—	October 18, 2009	Mount Lemmon	Mount Lemmon Survey	·	1.6 km	MPC · JPL
266846	2009 UA_{46}	—	October 18, 2009	Mount Lemmon	Mount Lemmon Survey	KOR	1.8 km	MPC · JPL
266847	2009 UE_{46}	—	October 18, 2009	Mount Lemmon	Mount Lemmon Survey	AGN	1.7 km	MPC · JPL
266848	2009 UB_{53}	—	October 22, 2009	Kitt Peak	Spacewatch	·	2.0 km	MPC · JPL
266849	2009 UH_{61}	—	October 17, 2009	Mount Lemmon	Mount Lemmon Survey	NEM	2.5 km	MPC · JPL
266850	2009 UL_{61}	—	November 6, 2005	Mount Lemmon	Mount Lemmon Survey	·	1.9 km	MPC · JPL
266851	2009 UK_{79}	—	February 27, 2001	Kitt Peak	Spacewatch	L4	9.9 km	MPC · JPL
266852	2009 UB_{87}	—	October 24, 2009	Catalina	CSS	AEO	1.4 km	MPC · JPL
266853	2009 UP_{88}	—	October 21, 2009	Catalina	CSS	CYB	6.1 km	MPC · JPL
266854 Sezenaksu	2009 UB_{90}	Sezenaksu	October 24, 2009	Nogales	J.-C. Merlin	·	2.4 km	MPC · JPL
266855	2009 UD_{97}	—	October 22, 2009	Mount Lemmon	Mount Lemmon Survey	AGN	1.8 km	MPC · JPL
266856	2009 UV_{97}	—	October 23, 2009	Mount Lemmon	Mount Lemmon Survey	·	1.3 km	MPC · JPL
266857	2009 UH_{98}	—	October 23, 2009	Mount Lemmon	Mount Lemmon Survey	·	2.2 km	MPC · JPL
266858	2009 UK_{99}	—	October 23, 2009	Mount Lemmon	Mount Lemmon Survey	·	3.7 km	MPC · JPL
266859	2009 UJ_{109}	—	October 23, 2009	Kitt Peak	Spacewatch	·	3.5 km	MPC · JPL
266860	2009 UZ_{109}	—	October 23, 2009	Kitt Peak	Spacewatch	·	1.9 km	MPC · JPL
266861	2009 UO_{112}	—	October 25, 2009	La Sagra	OAM	·	3.6 km	MPC · JPL
266862	2009 UC_{121}	—	October 24, 2009	Kitt Peak	Spacewatch	·	2.5 km	MPC · JPL
266863	2009 UH_{133}	—	October 21, 2009	Mount Lemmon	Mount Lemmon Survey	·	2.9 km	MPC · JPL
266864	2009 UE_{138}	—	October 27, 2009	Kitt Peak	Spacewatch	·	2.2 km	MPC · JPL
266865	2009 UR_{138}	—	October 22, 2009	Mount Lemmon	Mount Lemmon Survey	KOR	1.8 km	MPC · JPL
266866	2009 UX_{138}	—	October 26, 2009	Kitt Peak	Spacewatch	·	3.4 km	MPC · JPL
266867	2009 UN_{141}	—	October 16, 2009	Catalina	CSS	·	4.3 km	MPC · JPL
266868	2009 UG_{151}	—	October 26, 2009	Kitt Peak	Spacewatch	KOR	1.4 km	MPC · JPL
266869	2009 UZ_{151}	—	October 18, 2009	Socorro	LINEAR	L4	13 km	MPC · JPL
266870	2009 UY_{154}	—	October 22, 2009	Catalina	CSS	·	1.5 km	MPC · JPL
266871	2009 VR_{3}	—	November 8, 2009	Kitt Peak	Spacewatch	RAF	1.4 km	MPC · JPL
266872	2009 VA_{21}	—	November 9, 2009	Mount Lemmon	Mount Lemmon Survey	NYS	1.3 km	MPC · JPL
266873	2009 VQ_{22}	—	November 9, 2009	Mount Lemmon	Mount Lemmon Survey	·	2.7 km	MPC · JPL
266874	2009 VA_{33}	—	November 9, 2009	Mount Lemmon	Mount Lemmon Survey	·	4.9 km	MPC · JPL
266875	2009 VS_{38}	—	November 9, 2009	Kitt Peak	Spacewatch	·	3.4 km	MPC · JPL
266876	2009 VB_{53}	—	November 10, 2009	Mount Lemmon	Mount Lemmon Survey	KOR	1.5 km	MPC · JPL
266877	2009 VP_{59}	—	November 9, 2009	Catalina	CSS	·	3.6 km	MPC · JPL
266878	2009 VN_{64}	—	November 9, 2009	Kitt Peak	Spacewatch	HOF	2.7 km	MPC · JPL
266879	2009 VL_{73}	—	November 11, 2009	Mount Lemmon	Mount Lemmon Survey	·	1.8 km	MPC · JPL
266880	2009 VK_{77}	—	November 9, 2009	Catalina	CSS	·	3.0 km	MPC · JPL
266881	2009 VW_{78}	—	November 10, 2009	Catalina	CSS	ARM	6.6 km	MPC · JPL
266882	2009 VP_{79}	—	November 10, 2009	Catalina	CSS	·	4.1 km	MPC · JPL
266883	2009 VD_{80}	—	November 11, 2009	Catalina	CSS	·	2.8 km	MPC · JPL
266884	2009 VV_{92}	—	November 10, 2009	Catalina	CSS	EOS	2.7 km	MPC · JPL
266885	2009 VS_{108}	—	November 9, 2009	Kitt Peak	Spacewatch	EOS	2.7 km	MPC · JPL
266886	2009 VB_{112}	—	November 8, 2009	Catalina	CSS	·	4.2 km	MPC · JPL
266887 Wolfgangries	2009 WO_{24}	Wolfgangries	November 19, 2009	Gaisberg	Gierlinger, R.	·	3.2 km	MPC · JPL
266888	2009 WU_{45}	—	November 18, 2009	Mount Lemmon	Mount Lemmon Survey	·	2.0 km	MPC · JPL
266889	2009 WW_{46}	—	November 18, 2009	Mount Lemmon	Mount Lemmon Survey	TEL	2.3 km	MPC · JPL
266890	2009 WN_{48}	—	November 19, 2009	Mount Lemmon	Mount Lemmon Survey	·	1.4 km	MPC · JPL
266891	2009 WR_{49}	—	November 19, 2009	Mount Lemmon	Mount Lemmon Survey	(45637) · CYB	4.5 km	MPC · JPL
266892	2009 WL_{50}	—	November 19, 2009	La Sagra	OAM	EOS	2.9 km	MPC · JPL
266893	2009 WA_{76}	—	November 18, 2009	Kitt Peak	Spacewatch	3:2 · SHU	5.2 km	MPC · JPL
266894	2009 WR_{81}	—	November 18, 2009	La Sagra	OAM	CYB	6.1 km	MPC · JPL
266895	2009 WS_{81}	—	November 18, 2009	La Sagra	OAM	·	4.3 km	MPC · JPL
266896	2009 WR_{101}	—	March 20, 2001	Kitt Peak	Spacewatch	·	2.1 km	MPC · JPL
266897	2009 WK_{104}	—	November 18, 2009	La Sagra	OAM	EUP	5.8 km	MPC · JPL
266898	2009 WY_{105}	—	August 24, 2008	Kitt Peak	Spacewatch	L4	9.4 km	MPC · JPL
266899	2009 WA_{106}	—	November 26, 2009	Mayhill	Lowe, A.	AGN	1.9 km	MPC · JPL
266900	2009 WN_{112}	—	November 17, 2009	Catalina	CSS	THB	6.7 km	MPC · JPL

== 266901–267000 ==
back to top

Designation			Discovery			Properties		Ref
Permanent	Provisional	Named after	Date	Site	Discoverer(s)	Category	Diam.	Ref
266901	2009 WL_{121}	—	November 20, 2009	Kitt Peak	Spacewatch	·	2.3 km	MPC · JPL
266902	2009 WH_{146}	—	November 19, 2009	Mount Lemmon	Mount Lemmon Survey	HYG	3.2 km	MPC · JPL
266903	2009 WO_{156}	—	November 20, 2009	Kitt Peak	Spacewatch	·	3.5 km	MPC · JPL
266904	2009 WE_{175}	—	November 23, 2009	Kitt Peak	Spacewatch	·	3.9 km	MPC · JPL
266905	2009 WP_{177}	—	November 23, 2009	Mount Lemmon	Mount Lemmon Survey	·	4.7 km	MPC · JPL
266906	2009 WN_{193}	—	November 24, 2009	Mount Lemmon	Mount Lemmon Survey	·	3.3 km	MPC · JPL
266907	2009 WB_{203}	—	November 16, 2009	Kitt Peak	Spacewatch	·	2.1 km	MPC · JPL
266908	2009 WX_{209}	—	November 18, 2009	Kitt Peak	Spacewatch	3:2	5.5 km	MPC · JPL
266909	2009 WP_{220}	—	November 16, 2009	Mount Lemmon	Mount Lemmon Survey	·	1.6 km	MPC · JPL
266910	2009 WD_{234}	—	November 18, 2009	Mount Lemmon	Mount Lemmon Survey	·	2.7 km	MPC · JPL
266911	2009 WV_{248}	—	November 17, 2009	Catalina	CSS	·	4.7 km	MPC · JPL
266912	2009 WZ_{248}	—	November 18, 2009	Mount Lemmon	Mount Lemmon Survey	·	4.0 km	MPC · JPL
266913	2009 WQ_{251}	—	August 23, 2003	Palomar	NEAT	·	2.9 km	MPC · JPL
266914	2009 WV_{260}	—	November 25, 2009	Kitt Peak	Spacewatch	·	2.8 km	MPC · JPL
266915	2009 XX_{12}	—	December 11, 2009	Catalina	CSS	·	3.0 km	MPC · JPL
266916	2009 YJ_{22}	—	December 17, 2009	Kitt Peak	Spacewatch	·	1.3 km	MPC · JPL
266917	2010 AN	—	January 4, 2010	Kitt Peak	Spacewatch	V	880 m	MPC · JPL
266918	2010 AZ_{71}	—	January 13, 2010	Kitt Peak	Spacewatch	CYB	3.9 km	MPC · JPL
266919	2010 BS_{24}	—	January 17, 2010	WISE	WISE	·	2.7 km	MPC · JPL
266920	2010 CY_{21}	—	February 9, 2010	Kitt Peak	Spacewatch	·	1.5 km	MPC · JPL
266921 Culhane	2010 CN_{52}	Culhane	February 14, 2010	WISE	WISE	·	2.3 km	MPC · JPL
266922	2010 CC_{173}	—	February 6, 2010	Kitt Peak	Spacewatch	·	1.8 km	MPC · JPL
266923	2010 DS_{21}	—	February 16, 2010	Socorro	LINEAR	·	5.2 km	MPC · JPL
266924	2010 DK_{52}	—	February 21, 2010	WISE	WISE	LUT	6.4 km	MPC · JPL
266925	2010 ER_{82}	—	March 12, 2010	Catalina	CSS	·	2.4 km	MPC · JPL
266926	2010 EF_{128}	—	March 12, 2010	Kitt Peak	Spacewatch	·	2.2 km	MPC · JPL
266927	2010 EG_{128}	—	March 12, 2010	Kitt Peak	Spacewatch	·	2.8 km	MPC · JPL
266928	2010 FE_{16}	—	March 18, 2010	Kitt Peak	Spacewatch	·	3.4 km	MPC · JPL
266929	2010 GB_{158}	—	April 12, 2010	Kitt Peak	Spacewatch	·	3.9 km	MPC · JPL
266930	2010 HZ_{37}	—	April 21, 2010	WISE	WISE	·	2.0 km	MPC · JPL
266931	2010 JZ_{119}	—	May 12, 2010	Kitt Peak	Spacewatch	EOS	2.6 km	MPC · JPL
266932	2010 JT_{162}	—	May 8, 2010	Mount Lemmon	Mount Lemmon Survey	·	4.1 km	MPC · JPL
266933	2010 MT_{107}	—	June 30, 2010	WISE	WISE	·	2.9 km	MPC · JPL
266934	2010 NT_{37}	—	October 23, 2001	Kitt Peak	Spacewatch	·	2.4 km	MPC · JPL
266935	2010 NO_{67}	—	July 20, 1999	Anderson Mesa	LONEOS	·	1.4 km	MPC · JPL
266936	2010 NJ_{82}	—	September 30, 2005	Palomar	NEAT	·	4.2 km	MPC · JPL
266937	2010 PM_{8}	—	August 2, 2010	Socorro	LINEAR	·	1.3 km	MPC · JPL
266938	2010 PB_{63}	—	August 13, 2010	Socorro	LINEAR	H	870 m	MPC · JPL
266939	2010 RD_{49}	—	October 7, 2004	Kitt Peak	Spacewatch	·	4.2 km	MPC · JPL
266940	2010 RP_{176}	—	September 12, 2001	Kitt Peak	Spacewatch	·	2.1 km	MPC · JPL
266941	2010 ST_{20}	—	August 31, 2005	Kitt Peak	Spacewatch	KOR	1.6 km	MPC · JPL
266942	2010 SZ_{23}	—	August 13, 2002	Palomar	NEAT	·	1.6 km	MPC · JPL
266943	2010 TH_{2}	—	October 22, 2005	Kitt Peak	Spacewatch	·	2.7 km	MPC · JPL
266944	2010 TP_{2}	—	May 15, 2005	Mount Lemmon	Mount Lemmon Survey	(5)	1.7 km	MPC · JPL
266945	2010 TD_{5}	—	July 21, 2006	Catalina	CSS	·	1.5 km	MPC · JPL
266946	2010 TH_{30}	—	November 10, 1999	Kitt Peak	Spacewatch	·	1.2 km	MPC · JPL
266947	2010 TP_{149}	—	November 3, 2004	Catalina	CSS	·	3.8 km	MPC · JPL
266948	2010 TS_{173}	—	August 20, 2006	Palomar	NEAT	·	1.2 km	MPC · JPL
266949	2010 TZ_{179}	—	April 10, 2005	Mount Lemmon	Mount Lemmon Survey	V	920 m	MPC · JPL
266950	2010 UC_{3}	—	November 29, 2003	Kitt Peak	Spacewatch	·	1.1 km	MPC · JPL
266951	2010 UY_{14}	—	June 4, 2006	Mount Lemmon	Mount Lemmon Survey	·	970 m	MPC · JPL
266952	2010 US_{16}	—	September 26, 2005	Kitt Peak	Spacewatch	HOF	2.9 km	MPC · JPL
266953	2010 UC_{27}	—	October 25, 1997	Caussols	ODAS	L4	10 km	MPC · JPL
266954	2010 UK_{36}	—	August 28, 2005	Kitt Peak	Spacewatch	·	1.5 km	MPC · JPL
266955	2010 UU_{36}	—	October 21, 2001	Socorro	LINEAR	·	2.0 km	MPC · JPL
266956	2010 UB_{49}	—	June 18, 2006	Kitt Peak	Spacewatch	NYS	1.1 km	MPC · JPL
266957	2010 UF_{58}	—	November 20, 2004	Kitt Peak	Spacewatch	CYB	3.6 km	MPC · JPL
266958	2010 US_{96}	—	March 2, 2006	Catalina	CSS	H	700 m	MPC · JPL
266959	2010 UG_{102}	—	December 6, 2000	Kitt Peak	Spacewatch	·	2.0 km	MPC · JPL
266960	2010 VZ_{13}	—	May 23, 2001	Cerro Tololo	Deep Ecliptic Survey	·	1.7 km	MPC · JPL
266961	2010 VR_{26}	—	October 21, 2001	Socorro	LINEAR	·	1.9 km	MPC · JPL
266962	2010 VG_{48}	—	September 15, 2009	Kitt Peak	Spacewatch	L4	10 km	MPC · JPL
266963	2010 VO_{48}	—	December 28, 2003	Kitt Peak	Spacewatch	·	1.2 km	MPC · JPL
266964	2010 VN_{51}	—	October 6, 2004	Kitt Peak	Spacewatch	·	4.8 km	MPC · JPL
266965	2010 VB_{58}	—	April 1, 2003	Apache Point	SDSS	L4	20 km	MPC · JPL
266966	2010 VL_{69}	—	November 5, 1994	Kitt Peak	Spacewatch	·	910 m	MPC · JPL
266967	2010 VN_{83}	—	October 8, 1994	Kitt Peak	Spacewatch	·	2.6 km	MPC · JPL
266968	2010 VS_{84}	—	November 30, 2005	Kitt Peak	Spacewatch	·	1.8 km	MPC · JPL
266969	2010 VU_{85}	—	September 19, 2001	Kleť	M. Tichý, M. Kočer	·	1.7 km	MPC · JPL
266970	2010 VS_{96}	—	October 28, 1995	Kitt Peak	Spacewatch	NYS	1.2 km	MPC · JPL
266971	2010 VE_{100}	—	February 17, 2001	Haleakala	NEAT	·	4.3 km	MPC · JPL
266972	2010 VF_{103}	—	December 1, 2005	Kitt Peak	Spacewatch	EOS	2.6 km	MPC · JPL
266973	2010 VB_{121}	—	January 18, 2004	Palomar	NEAT	·	1.2 km	MPC · JPL
266974	2010 VK_{133}	—	October 9, 1993	La Silla	E. W. Elst	·	680 m	MPC · JPL
266975	2010 VQ_{137}	—	September 6, 1999	Kitt Peak	Spacewatch	·	970 m	MPC · JPL
266976	2010 VG_{184}	—	September 19, 2003	Kitt Peak	Spacewatch	·	710 m	MPC · JPL
266977	2010 VK_{197}	—	December 18, 2004	Mount Lemmon	Mount Lemmon Survey	·	4.1 km	MPC · JPL
266978	2010 VP_{198}	—	November 20, 2001	Kitt Peak	Spacewatch	·	2.4 km	MPC · JPL
266979	2010 WC_{16}	—	October 6, 2008	Mount Lemmon	Mount Lemmon Survey	L4	10 km	MPC · JPL
266980	2010 WP_{20}	—	May 5, 2003	Kitt Peak	Spacewatch	AEO	1.5 km	MPC · JPL
266981	2010 WO_{38}	—	July 25, 2003	Palomar	NEAT	·	820 m	MPC · JPL
266982	2010 WL_{62}	—	July 21, 2007	Lulin	LUSS	L4	12 km	MPC · JPL
266983 Josepbosch	2010 WE_{66}	Josepbosch	November 30, 2005	Kitt Peak	Spacewatch	·	3.8 km	MPC · JPL
266984	2010 WN_{69}	—	November 30, 2000	Kitt Peak	Spacewatch	·	2.0 km	MPC · JPL
266985	2010 XZ_{4}	—	January 29, 2007	Kitt Peak	Spacewatch	·	4.5 km	MPC · JPL
266986	2010 XQ_{17}	—	February 22, 1998	Kitt Peak	Spacewatch	·	2.0 km	MPC · JPL
266987	2010 XK_{24}	—	July 28, 2005	Palomar	NEAT	·	2.6 km	MPC · JPL
266988	2010 XF_{35}	—	April 11, 2003	Kitt Peak	Spacewatch	L4	10 km	MPC · JPL
266989	2010 XC_{36}	—	April 9, 2003	Palomar	NEAT	·	2.5 km	MPC · JPL
266990	2010 XB_{37}	—	July 18, 2001	Palomar	NEAT	·	1.4 km	MPC · JPL
266991	2010 XX_{37}	—	July 30, 2005	Palomar	NEAT	V	910 m	MPC · JPL
266992	2010 XR_{43}	—	November 16, 1998	Kitt Peak	Spacewatch	L4 · slow	13 km	MPC · JPL
266993	2010 XV_{44}	—	July 8, 2003	Palomar	NEAT	·	4.7 km	MPC · JPL
266994	2010 XH_{62}	—	February 13, 2001	Kitt Peak	Spacewatch	·	2.7 km	MPC · JPL
266995	2010 XD_{67}	—	January 16, 2000	Kitt Peak	Spacewatch	L4	12 km	MPC · JPL
266996	2010 XQ_{78}	—	October 1, 2009	Mount Lemmon	Mount Lemmon Survey	L4	15 km	MPC · JPL
266997	2010 XR_{86}	—	June 13, 2001	Kitt Peak	Spacewatch	(5)	2.2 km	MPC · JPL
266998	2010 YO_{1}	—	January 23, 2004	Anderson Mesa	LONEOS	·	1.5 km	MPC · JPL
266999	5039 P-L	—	October 22, 1960	Palomar	C. J. van Houten, I. van Houten-Groeneveld, T. Gehrels	·	1.5 km	MPC · JPL
267000	6229 P-L	—	September 25, 1960	Palomar	C. J. van Houten, I. van Houten-Groeneveld, T. Gehrels	·	1 km	MPC · JPL

back to top

== See also ==
- Meanings of minor-planet names: 266001–267000
