= László Szabados (disambiguation) =

László Szabados may refer to:

- László Szabados (1911–1997), a Hungarian swimmer
- László Szabados (astronomer) (born 1948), a Hungarian astronomer

== See also ==
- Asteroid 265490 Szabados, named after the astronomer
