= List of minor planets: 265001–266000 =

The following is a partial list of minor planets, running from minor-planet number 265001 through 266000, inclusive. The primary data for this and other partial lists is based on JPL's "Small-Body Orbital Elements" and data available from the Minor Planet Center. Critical list information is also provided by the MPC, unless otherwise specified from Lowell Observatory. A detailed description of the table's columns and additional sources are given on the main page including a complete list of every page in this series, and a statistical break-up on the dynamical classification of minor planets.

Also see the summary list of all named bodies in numerical and alphabetical order, and the corresponding naming citations for the number range of this particular list. New namings may only be added to this list after official publication, as the preannouncement of names is condemned by the Working Group for Small Bodies Nomenclature of the International Astronomical Union.

Near-Earth obj.	MBA (inner)	MBA (outer)	Centaur
Mars-crosser	MBA (middle)	Jupiter trojan	Trans-Neptunian obj.
Unclassified

== 265001–265100 ==
Designation			Discovery			Properties		Ref
Permanent	Provisional	Named after	Date	Site	Discoverer(s)	Category	Diam.	Ref
265001	2003 ES_{35}	—	March 7, 2003	Anderson Mesa	LONEOS	·	1.6 km	MPC · JPL
265002	2003 EF_{49}	—	March 10, 2003	Anderson Mesa	LONEOS	·	1.4 km	MPC · JPL
265003	2003 EK_{57}	—	March 9, 2003	Anderson Mesa	LONEOS	·	1.9 km	MPC · JPL
265004	2003 EU_{57}	—	March 9, 2003	Palomar	NEAT	EUN	1.9 km	MPC · JPL
265005	2003 ED_{59}	—	March 11, 2003	Palomar	NEAT	H	760 m	MPC · JPL
265006	2003 EH_{63}	—	March 10, 2003	Palomar	NEAT	·	1.7 km	MPC · JPL
265007	2003 FH_{27}	—	March 24, 2003	Kitt Peak	Spacewatch	·	1.9 km	MPC · JPL
265008	2003 FK_{68}	—	March 26, 2003	Palomar	NEAT	EUN	1.8 km	MPC · JPL
265009	2003 FA_{69}	—	March 26, 2003	Kitt Peak	Spacewatch	MAR	1.5 km	MPC · JPL
265010	2003 FQ_{80}	—	March 27, 2003	Socorro	LINEAR	·	1.8 km	MPC · JPL
265011	2003 FK_{94}	—	March 29, 2003	Anderson Mesa	LONEOS	·	2.3 km	MPC · JPL
265012	2003 FM_{103}	—	March 24, 2003	Kitt Peak	Spacewatch	·	1.5 km	MPC · JPL
265013	2003 FX_{129}	—	March 26, 2003	Palomar	NEAT	·	1.8 km	MPC · JPL
265014	2003 FE_{130}	—	March 26, 2003	Kitt Peak	Spacewatch	·	1.8 km	MPC · JPL
265015	2003 GN_{8}	—	April 3, 2003	Anderson Mesa	LONEOS	·	1.1 km	MPC · JPL
265016	2003 GS_{24}	—	April 7, 2003	Kitt Peak	Spacewatch	(5)	1.5 km	MPC · JPL
265017	2003 GC_{34}	—	April 5, 2003	Kitt Peak	Spacewatch	·	3.3 km	MPC · JPL
265018	2003 GS_{43}	—	April 9, 2003	Socorro	LINEAR	EUN	1.9 km	MPC · JPL
265019	2003 HS_{1}	—	April 23, 2003	Campo Imperatore	CINEOS	MRX	1.6 km	MPC · JPL
265020	2003 HF_{17}	—	April 24, 2003	Haleakala	NEAT	·	1.9 km	MPC · JPL
265021	2003 HP_{22}	—	April 24, 2003	Kitt Peak	Spacewatch	·	1.6 km	MPC · JPL
265022	2003 HA_{31}	—	April 26, 2003	Kitt Peak	Spacewatch	·	1.4 km	MPC · JPL
265023	2003 HA_{42}	—	April 29, 2003	Haleakala	NEAT	EUN	2.1 km	MPC · JPL
265024	2003 HJ_{42}	—	April 28, 2003	Anderson Mesa	LONEOS	·	3.0 km	MPC · JPL
265025	2003 JG_{17}	—	May 8, 2003	Socorro	LINEAR	·	2.7 km	MPC · JPL
265026	2003 LT_{6}	—	June 7, 2003	Kitt Peak	Spacewatch	·	2.2 km	MPC · JPL
265027	2003 MH_{2}	—	June 23, 2003	Socorro	LINEAR	·	4.2 km	MPC · JPL
265028	2003 MZ_{12}	—	June 24, 2003	Campo Imperatore	CINEOS	·	5.4 km	MPC · JPL
265029	2003 NK	—	July 1, 2003	Haleakala	NEAT	·	3.3 km	MPC · JPL
265030	2003 NE_{2}	—	July 3, 2003	Socorro	LINEAR	·	2.8 km	MPC · JPL
265031	2003 OT	—	July 21, 2003	Wrightwood	J. W. Young	TIR	2.2 km	MPC · JPL
265032	2003 OU	—	July 20, 2003	Palomar	NEAT	T_{j} (2.98) · APO +1km	1.9 km	MPC · JPL
265033	2003 OF_{15}	—	July 22, 2003	Palomar	NEAT	·	3.3 km	MPC · JPL
265034	2003 OT_{19}	—	July 31, 2003	Campo Imperatore	CINEOS	·	4.4 km	MPC · JPL
265035	2003 OZ_{19}	—	July 30, 2003	Needville	Dillon, W. G., Garossino, P.	·	3.5 km	MPC · JPL
265036	2003 OP_{27}	—	July 24, 2003	Palomar	NEAT	·	4.3 km	MPC · JPL
265037	2003 OT_{30}	—	July 24, 2003	Palomar	NEAT	·	2.1 km	MPC · JPL
265038	2003 OV_{32}	—	July 24, 2003	Palomar	NEAT	·	800 m	MPC · JPL
265039	2003 PM_{1}	—	August 1, 2003	Haleakala	NEAT	·	2.5 km	MPC · JPL
265040	2003 QQ_{2}	—	August 19, 2003	Campo Imperatore	CINEOS	EOS	2.9 km	MPC · JPL
265041	2003 QB_{7}	—	August 20, 2003	Campo Imperatore	CINEOS	·	3.8 km	MPC · JPL
265042	2003 QH_{26}	—	August 22, 2003	Haleakala	NEAT	·	930 m	MPC · JPL
265043	2003 QG_{27}	—	August 23, 2003	Palomar	NEAT	·	2.7 km	MPC · JPL
265044	2003 QE_{35}	—	August 22, 2003	Palomar	NEAT	·	4.0 km	MPC · JPL
265045	2003 QS_{49}	—	August 22, 2003	Socorro	LINEAR	·	810 m	MPC · JPL
265046	2003 QH_{54}	—	August 23, 2003	Socorro	LINEAR	·	3.3 km	MPC · JPL
265047	2003 QG_{65}	—	August 23, 2003	Palomar	NEAT	·	3.9 km	MPC · JPL
265048	2003 QP_{75}	—	August 24, 2003	Socorro	LINEAR	·	3.3 km	MPC · JPL
265049	2003 QA_{80}	—	August 27, 2003	Reedy Creek	J. Broughton	·	4.1 km	MPC · JPL
265050	2003 QR_{105}	—	August 31, 2003	Socorro	LINEAR	T_{j} (2.95)	7.5 km	MPC · JPL
265051	2003 QB_{113}	—	August 31, 2003	Socorro	LINEAR	·	3.2 km	MPC · JPL
265052	2003 QD_{114}	—	August 22, 2003	Campo Imperatore	CINEOS	·	3.8 km	MPC · JPL
265053	2003 RF_{2}	—	September 2, 2003	Reedy Creek	J. Broughton	·	1.4 km	MPC · JPL
265054	2003 RG_{10}	—	September 3, 2003	Bergisch Gladbach	W. Bickel	·	710 m	MPC · JPL
265055	2003 RY_{10}	—	September 4, 2003	Socorro	LINEAR	·	5.5 km	MPC · JPL
265056	2003 SB_{9}	—	September 17, 2003	Kitt Peak	Spacewatch	·	4.0 km	MPC · JPL
265057	2003 SS_{28}	—	September 18, 2003	Palomar	NEAT	·	3.4 km	MPC · JPL
265058	2003 SS_{30}	—	September 18, 2003	Kitt Peak	Spacewatch	·	660 m	MPC · JPL
265059 Bajorgizi	2003 SD_{33}	Bajorgizi	September 18, 2003	Piszkéstető	K. Sárneczky, B. Sipőcz	VER	3.4 km	MPC · JPL
265060	2003 SV_{38}	—	September 16, 2003	Palomar	NEAT	·	5.2 km	MPC · JPL
265061	2003 SG_{39}	—	September 16, 2003	Palomar	NEAT	·	1.0 km	MPC · JPL
265062	2003 SZ_{40}	—	September 17, 2003	Palomar	NEAT	EUP	5.1 km	MPC · JPL
265063	2003 SP_{45}	—	September 16, 2003	Anderson Mesa	LONEOS	·	5.5 km	MPC · JPL
265064	2003 SA_{49}	—	September 18, 2003	Palomar	NEAT	·	4.3 km	MPC · JPL
265065	2003 SX_{58}	—	September 17, 2003	Anderson Mesa	LONEOS	EOS	3.6 km	MPC · JPL
265066	2003 SC_{78}	—	September 19, 2003	Kitt Peak	Spacewatch	·	4.2 km	MPC · JPL
265067	2003 SR_{82}	—	September 18, 2003	Kitt Peak	Spacewatch	·	3.2 km	MPC · JPL
265068	2003 SM_{83}	—	September 18, 2003	Kitt Peak	Spacewatch	EOS	3.1 km	MPC · JPL
265069	2003 SY_{94}	—	September 19, 2003	Kitt Peak	Spacewatch	(31811)	3.1 km	MPC · JPL
265070	2003 SA_{97}	—	September 19, 2003	Palomar	NEAT	·	4.2 km	MPC · JPL
265071	2003 SB_{105}	—	September 20, 2003	Palomar	NEAT	CYB	3.4 km	MPC · JPL
265072	2003 SE_{106}	—	September 20, 2003	Palomar	NEAT	TIR	3.8 km	MPC · JPL
265073	2003 SJ_{132}	—	September 19, 2003	Kitt Peak	Spacewatch	EOS	3.1 km	MPC · JPL
265074	2003 SD_{140}	—	September 18, 2003	Campo Imperatore	CINEOS	HYG	4.2 km	MPC · JPL
265075	2003 SN_{145}	—	September 20, 2003	Socorro	LINEAR	·	4.1 km	MPC · JPL
265076	2003 SJ_{152}	—	September 19, 2003	Anderson Mesa	LONEOS	·	4.1 km	MPC · JPL
265077	2003 SE_{154}	—	September 19, 2003	Anderson Mesa	LONEOS	EUP	7.9 km	MPC · JPL
265078	2003 SN_{160}	—	September 22, 2003	Kitt Peak	Spacewatch	·	4.9 km	MPC · JPL
265079	2003 SW_{162}	—	September 19, 2003	Kitt Peak	Spacewatch	·	3.4 km	MPC · JPL
265080	2003 SY_{170}	—	September 23, 2003	Uccle	T. Pauwels	·	700 m	MPC · JPL
265081	2003 SN_{176}	—	September 18, 2003	Palomar	NEAT	EOS	2.5 km	MPC · JPL
265082	2003 SU_{178}	—	September 19, 2003	Socorro	LINEAR	VER	4.8 km	MPC · JPL
265083	2003 SE_{188}	—	September 22, 2003	Palomar	NEAT	·	4.3 km	MPC · JPL
265084	2003 SD_{191}	—	September 18, 2003	Palomar	NEAT	·	4.6 km	MPC · JPL
265085	2003 SM_{209}	—	September 24, 2003	Haleakala	NEAT	·	1.0 km	MPC · JPL
265086	2003 SS_{209}	—	September 25, 2003	Kvistaberg	Uppsala-DLR Asteroid Survey	·	4.1 km	MPC · JPL
265087	2003 SR_{235}	—	September 25, 2003	Palomar	NEAT	·	3.5 km	MPC · JPL
265088	2003 SW_{242}	—	September 27, 2003	Kitt Peak	Spacewatch	·	700 m	MPC · JPL
265089	2003 SG_{264}	—	September 28, 2003	Socorro	LINEAR	·	3.0 km	MPC · JPL
265090	2003 SK_{274}	—	September 28, 2003	Kitt Peak	Spacewatch	EOS	2.7 km	MPC · JPL
265091	2003 SG_{277}	—	September 30, 2003	Socorro	LINEAR	·	4.2 km	MPC · JPL
265092	2003 SJ_{277}	—	September 30, 2003	Socorro	LINEAR	EMA	5.5 km	MPC · JPL
265093	2003 ST_{286}	—	September 21, 2003	Palomar	NEAT	·	5.7 km	MPC · JPL
265094	2003 SF_{289}	—	September 28, 2003	Socorro	LINEAR	TIR	3.3 km	MPC · JPL
265095	2003 SG_{289}	—	September 28, 2003	Socorro	LINEAR	·	4.0 km	MPC · JPL
265096	2003 SE_{290}	—	September 28, 2003	Anderson Mesa	LONEOS	(21885)	5.0 km	MPC · JPL
265097	2003 SJ_{298}	—	September 18, 2003	Haleakala	NEAT	·	780 m	MPC · JPL
265098	2003 SD_{305}	—	September 17, 2003	Palomar	NEAT	·	950 m	MPC · JPL
265099	2003 SX_{306}	—	September 30, 2003	Kitt Peak	Spacewatch	·	3.5 km	MPC · JPL
265100	2003 SZ_{307}	—	September 27, 2003	Socorro	LINEAR	·	1.1 km	MPC · JPL

== 265101–265200 ==
back to top

Designation			Discovery			Properties		Ref
Permanent	Provisional	Named after	Date	Site	Discoverer(s)	Category	Diam.	Ref
265101	2003 SF_{319}	—	September 20, 2003	Kitt Peak	Spacewatch	·	650 m	MPC · JPL
265102	2003 SK_{319}	—	September 21, 2003	Kitt Peak	Spacewatch	·	3.0 km	MPC · JPL
265103	2003 SA_{320}	—	September 16, 2003	Kitt Peak	Spacewatch	·	3.3 km	MPC · JPL
265104	2003 SJ_{320}	—	September 17, 2003	Kitt Peak	Spacewatch	·	3.4 km	MPC · JPL
265105	2003 ST_{320}	—	September 18, 2003	Kitt Peak	Spacewatch	·	900 m	MPC · JPL
265106	2003 SE_{321}	—	September 19, 2003	Kitt Peak	Spacewatch	VER	4.1 km	MPC · JPL
265107	2003 SO_{331}	—	September 27, 2003	Kitt Peak	Spacewatch	·	700 m	MPC · JPL
265108	2003 SR_{395}	—	September 26, 2003	Apache Point	SDSS	·	1.0 km	MPC · JPL
265109	2003 SF_{429}	—	September 20, 2003	Palomar	NEAT	VER	5.1 km	MPC · JPL
265110	2003 ST_{430}	—	September 30, 2003	Kitt Peak	Spacewatch	VER	5.2 km	MPC · JPL
265111	2003 TA_{19}	—	October 15, 2003	Anderson Mesa	LONEOS	·	5.8 km	MPC · JPL
265112	2003 TU_{37}	—	October 2, 2003	Kitt Peak	Spacewatch	·	780 m	MPC · JPL
265113	2003 TS_{38}	—	October 2, 2003	Kitt Peak	Spacewatch	EOS	2.4 km	MPC · JPL
265114	2003 TY_{46}	—	October 3, 2003	Kitt Peak	Spacewatch	·	730 m	MPC · JPL
265115	2003 TF_{47}	—	October 3, 2003	Kitt Peak	Spacewatch	HYG	3.6 km	MPC · JPL
265116	2003 TB_{59}	—	October 3, 2003	Kitt Peak	Spacewatch	EOS	2.5 km	MPC · JPL
265117	2003 UQ_{26}	—	October 25, 2003	Goodricke-Pigott	R. A. Tucker	·	1.1 km	MPC · JPL
265118	2003 UF_{61}	—	October 16, 2003	Palomar	NEAT	(31811)	4.3 km	MPC · JPL
265119	2003 UB_{65}	—	October 16, 2003	Anderson Mesa	LONEOS	EOS	3.3 km	MPC · JPL
265120	2003 UL_{65}	—	October 16, 2003	Palomar	NEAT	EOS	3.2 km	MPC · JPL
265121	2003 UF_{77}	—	October 17, 2003	Kitt Peak	Spacewatch	·	900 m	MPC · JPL
265122	2003 UD_{94}	—	October 18, 2003	Kitt Peak	Spacewatch	·	750 m	MPC · JPL
265123	2003 UP_{129}	—	October 18, 2003	Palomar	NEAT	·	4.0 km	MPC · JPL
265124	2003 UV_{131}	—	October 19, 2003	Palomar	NEAT	·	1.3 km	MPC · JPL
265125	2003 UT_{134}	—	October 20, 2003	Palomar	NEAT	·	1.2 km	MPC · JPL
265126	2003 UF_{139}	—	October 16, 2003	Palomar	NEAT	VER	3.8 km	MPC · JPL
265127	2003 UH_{139}	—	October 16, 2003	Palomar	NEAT	·	810 m	MPC · JPL
265128	2003 UG_{140}	—	October 16, 2003	Anderson Mesa	LONEOS	TEL	2.5 km	MPC · JPL
265129	2003 UV_{146}	—	October 18, 2003	Anderson Mesa	LONEOS	·	1.2 km	MPC · JPL
265130	2003 UZ_{149}	—	October 20, 2003	Socorro	LINEAR	·	910 m	MPC · JPL
265131	2003 UW_{175}	—	October 21, 2003	Palomar	NEAT	THM	3.6 km	MPC · JPL
265132	2003 UK_{183}	—	October 21, 2003	Palomar	NEAT	·	860 m	MPC · JPL
265133	2003 UJ_{205}	—	October 22, 2003	Palomar	NEAT	EOS	3.1 km	MPC · JPL
265134	2003 UY_{205}	—	October 22, 2003	Socorro	LINEAR	·	950 m	MPC · JPL
265135	2003 UZ_{212}	—	October 23, 2003	Kitt Peak	Spacewatch	·	1.0 km	MPC · JPL
265136	2003 UJ_{216}	—	October 21, 2003	Socorro	LINEAR	HYG	3.4 km	MPC · JPL
265137	2003 UU_{225}	—	October 22, 2003	Kitt Peak	Spacewatch	HYG	4.6 km	MPC · JPL
265138	2003 UV_{264}	—	October 27, 2003	Socorro	LINEAR	·	1.1 km	MPC · JPL
265139	2003 UV_{283}	—	October 30, 2003	Socorro	LINEAR	·	850 m	MPC · JPL
265140	2003 UH_{298}	—	October 16, 2003	Kitt Peak	Spacewatch	·	610 m	MPC · JPL
265141	2003 UX_{303}	—	October 17, 2003	Kitt Peak	Spacewatch	(883)	890 m	MPC · JPL
265142	2003 UP_{309}	—	October 20, 2003	Palomar	NEAT	·	1.0 km	MPC · JPL
265143	2003 UY_{309}	—	October 20, 2003	Palomar	NEAT	·	5.3 km	MPC · JPL
265144	2003 UY_{315}	—	October 21, 2003	Kitt Peak	Spacewatch	·	750 m	MPC · JPL
265145	2003 UA_{339}	—	October 18, 2003	Kitt Peak	Spacewatch	·	3.0 km	MPC · JPL
265146	2003 UY_{373}	—	October 22, 2003	Apache Point	SDSS	EOS	2.8 km	MPC · JPL
265147	2003 VA_{2}	—	November 3, 2003	Socorro	LINEAR	·	5.5 km	MPC · JPL
265148	2003 VD_{8}	—	November 14, 2003	Palomar	NEAT	·	1.1 km	MPC · JPL
265149	2003 WC_{12}	—	November 18, 2003	Palomar	NEAT	·	7.3 km	MPC · JPL
265150	2003 WM_{24}	—	November 19, 2003	Kitt Peak	Spacewatch	·	1.0 km	MPC · JPL
265151	2003 WB_{32}	—	November 18, 2003	Palomar	NEAT	·	840 m	MPC · JPL
265152	2003 WH_{34}	—	November 19, 2003	Kitt Peak	Spacewatch	·	3.6 km	MPC · JPL
265153	2003 WC_{37}	—	November 19, 2003	Socorro	LINEAR	·	960 m	MPC · JPL
265154	2003 WL_{43}	—	November 18, 2003	Palomar	NEAT	·	700 m	MPC · JPL
265155	2003 WD_{46}	—	November 20, 2003	Socorro	LINEAR	·	1.2 km	MPC · JPL
265156	2003 WO_{51}	—	November 19, 2003	Palomar	NEAT	·	920 m	MPC · JPL
265157	2003 WJ_{60}	—	November 18, 2003	Palomar	NEAT	·	920 m	MPC · JPL
265158	2003 WD_{64}	—	November 19, 2003	Kitt Peak	Spacewatch	VER	6.7 km	MPC · JPL
265159	2003 WN_{66}	—	November 19, 2003	Kitt Peak	Spacewatch	·	640 m	MPC · JPL
265160	2003 WA_{76}	—	November 19, 2003	Socorro	LINEAR	VER	4.0 km	MPC · JPL
265161	2003 WW_{81}	—	November 19, 2003	Socorro	LINEAR	·	4.6 km	MPC · JPL
265162	2003 WW_{82}	—	November 20, 2003	Palomar	NEAT	·	4.4 km	MPC · JPL
265163	2003 WX_{89}	—	November 16, 2003	Kitt Peak	Spacewatch	·	910 m	MPC · JPL
265164	2003 WD_{134}	—	November 21, 2003	Socorro	LINEAR	·	810 m	MPC · JPL
265165	2003 WM_{138}	—	November 21, 2003	Socorro	LINEAR	·	1.1 km	MPC · JPL
265166	2003 WJ_{140}	—	November 21, 2003	Socorro	LINEAR	·	1.3 km	MPC · JPL
265167	2003 WA_{143}	—	November 23, 2003	Socorro	LINEAR	·	5.3 km	MPC · JPL
265168	2003 WF_{143}	—	November 23, 2003	Socorro	LINEAR	TIR	5.4 km	MPC · JPL
265169	2003 WG_{147}	—	November 23, 2003	Socorro	LINEAR	·	1.2 km	MPC · JPL
265170	2003 WJ_{147}	—	November 23, 2003	Kitt Peak	Spacewatch	·	970 m	MPC · JPL
265171	2003 WJ_{168}	—	November 19, 2003	Palomar	NEAT	·	780 m	MPC · JPL
265172	2003 WY_{189}	—	November 24, 2003	Socorro	LINEAR	·	6.5 km	MPC · JPL
265173	2003 XU	—	December 3, 2003	Socorro	LINEAR	·	2.4 km	MPC · JPL
265174	2003 XF_{29}	—	December 1, 2003	Kitt Peak	Spacewatch	(1338) (FLO)	570 m	MPC · JPL
265175	2003 YR	—	December 17, 2003	Socorro	LINEAR	(895)	4.7 km	MPC · JPL
265176	2003 YV_{8}	—	December 19, 2003	Socorro	LINEAR	·	1.1 km	MPC · JPL
265177	2003 YU_{13}	—	December 17, 2003	Anderson Mesa	LONEOS	·	850 m	MPC · JPL
265178	2003 YZ_{18}	—	December 17, 2003	Palomar	NEAT	·	950 m	MPC · JPL
265179	2003 YT_{33}	—	December 17, 2003	Kitt Peak	Spacewatch	·	950 m	MPC · JPL
265180	2003 YR_{41}	—	December 19, 2003	Kitt Peak	Spacewatch	·	960 m	MPC · JPL
265181	2003 YF_{44}	—	December 19, 2003	Kitt Peak	Spacewatch	·	1.3 km	MPC · JPL
265182	2003 YR_{44}	—	December 19, 2003	Kitt Peak	Spacewatch	·	960 m	MPC · JPL
265183	2003 YP_{49}	—	December 18, 2003	Socorro	LINEAR	VER	5.2 km	MPC · JPL
265184	2003 YD_{74}	—	December 18, 2003	Socorro	LINEAR	·	790 m	MPC · JPL
265185	2003 YO_{102}	—	December 19, 2003	Socorro	LINEAR	·	1.2 km	MPC · JPL
265186	2003 YT_{113}	—	December 23, 2003	Socorro	LINEAR	·	1.1 km	MPC · JPL
265187	2003 YS_{117}	—	December 28, 2003	Socorro	LINEAR	APO +1km	780 m	MPC · JPL
265188	2004 AS_{10}	—	January 13, 2004	Anderson Mesa	LONEOS	·	1.0 km	MPC · JPL
265189	2004 BG_{19}	—	January 17, 2004	Palomar	NEAT	·	1.1 km	MPC · JPL
265190	2004 BD_{24}	—	January 19, 2004	Anderson Mesa	LONEOS	·	740 m	MPC · JPL
265191	2004 BU_{25}	—	January 19, 2004	Kitt Peak	Spacewatch	(2076)	1.1 km	MPC · JPL
265192	2004 BL_{29}	—	January 18, 2004	Palomar	NEAT	·	990 m	MPC · JPL
265193	2004 BW_{41}	—	January 19, 2004	Catalina	CSS	(2076)	1.1 km	MPC · JPL
265194	2004 BW_{47}	—	January 21, 2004	Socorro	LINEAR	·	840 m	MPC · JPL
265195	2004 BS_{53}	—	January 22, 2004	Socorro	LINEAR	·	940 m	MPC · JPL
265196	2004 BW_{58}	—	January 23, 2004	Socorro	LINEAR	APO · PHA	360 m	MPC · JPL
265197	2004 BF_{59}	—	January 23, 2004	Socorro	LINEAR	(2076)	1.2 km	MPC · JPL
265198	2004 BJ_{61}	—	January 22, 2004	Socorro	LINEAR	·	1.0 km	MPC · JPL
265199	2004 BO_{73}	—	January 24, 2004	Socorro	LINEAR	·	1.1 km	MPC · JPL
265200	2004 BL_{96}	—	January 24, 2004	Socorro	LINEAR	·	1.3 km	MPC · JPL

== 265201–265300 ==
back to top

Designation			Discovery			Properties		Ref
Permanent	Provisional	Named after	Date	Site	Discoverer(s)	Category	Diam.	Ref
265201	2004 BV_{99}	—	January 27, 2004	Kitt Peak	Spacewatch	·	1.3 km	MPC · JPL
265202	2004 BN_{102}	—	January 30, 2004	Socorro	LINEAR	·	1.2 km	MPC · JPL
265203	2004 BB_{105}	—	January 24, 2004	Socorro	LINEAR	·	1.0 km	MPC · JPL
265204	2004 BE_{107}	—	January 28, 2004	Catalina	CSS	·	1.2 km	MPC · JPL
265205	2004 BH_{108}	—	January 28, 2004	Catalina	CSS	·	1.3 km	MPC · JPL
265206	2004 BO_{109}	—	January 28, 2004	Catalina	CSS	·	1.2 km	MPC · JPL
265207	2004 BR_{109}	—	January 28, 2004	Socorro	LINEAR	PHO	1.5 km	MPC · JPL
265208	2004 BV_{111}	—	January 30, 2004	Socorro	LINEAR	·	1.3 km	MPC · JPL
265209	2004 BL_{118}	—	January 29, 2004	Socorro	LINEAR	·	1.6 km	MPC · JPL
265210	2004 BR_{121}	—	January 17, 2004	Palomar	NEAT	·	1.4 km	MPC · JPL
265211	2004 BY_{148}	—	January 16, 2004	Kitt Peak	Spacewatch	·	870 m	MPC · JPL
265212	2004 CE	—	February 2, 2004	Catalina	CSS	PHO	1.5 km	MPC · JPL
265213	2004 CJ_{18}	—	February 10, 2004	Palomar	NEAT	·	780 m	MPC · JPL
265214	2004 CL_{18}	—	February 10, 2004	Palomar	NEAT	V	970 m	MPC · JPL
265215	2004 CO_{21}	—	February 11, 2004	Anderson Mesa	LONEOS	·	1.5 km	MPC · JPL
265216	2004 CK_{27}	—	February 11, 2004	Palomar	NEAT	·	940 m	MPC · JPL
265217	2004 CU_{31}	—	February 12, 2004	Kitt Peak	Spacewatch	·	1.3 km	MPC · JPL
265218	2004 CA_{34}	—	February 12, 2004	Kitt Peak	Spacewatch	·	1.8 km	MPC · JPL
265219	2004 CW_{53}	—	February 11, 2004	Kitt Peak	Spacewatch	·	840 m	MPC · JPL
265220	2004 CH_{70}	—	February 11, 2004	Palomar	NEAT	·	1.4 km	MPC · JPL
265221	2004 CX_{71}	—	February 13, 2004	Palomar	NEAT	·	1.5 km	MPC · JPL
265222	2004 CF_{77}	—	February 11, 2004	Palomar	NEAT	·	1.2 km	MPC · JPL
265223	2004 CE_{79}	—	February 11, 2004	Palomar	NEAT	·	1.5 km	MPC · JPL
265224	2004 CE_{100}	—	February 15, 2004	Catalina	CSS	NYS	1.1 km	MPC · JPL
265225	2004 CZ_{104}	—	February 13, 2004	Palomar	NEAT	·	2.0 km	MPC · JPL
265226	2004 CC_{115}	—	February 11, 2004	Palomar	NEAT	·	1.1 km	MPC · JPL
265227	2004 CO_{118}	—	February 11, 2004	Palomar	NEAT	V	840 m	MPC · JPL
265228	2004 CM_{129}	—	February 14, 2004	Kitt Peak	Spacewatch	NYS	820 m	MPC · JPL
265229	2004 DE_{1}	—	February 17, 2004	Desert Eagle	W. K. Y. Yeung	·	1.5 km	MPC · JPL
265230	2004 DZ_{11}	—	February 17, 2004	Socorro	LINEAR	PHO	1.4 km	MPC · JPL
265231	2004 DT_{18}	—	February 18, 2004	Haleakala	NEAT	·	1.2 km	MPC · JPL
265232	2004 DE_{22}	—	February 17, 2004	Catalina	CSS	·	1.4 km	MPC · JPL
265233	2004 DL_{25}	—	February 20, 2004	Socorro	LINEAR	PHO	2.2 km	MPC · JPL
265234	2004 DZ_{25}	—	February 16, 2004	Socorro	LINEAR	·	1.3 km	MPC · JPL
265235	2004 DH_{26}	—	February 16, 2004	Kitt Peak	Spacewatch	·	1.3 km	MPC · JPL
265236	2004 DE_{36}	—	February 19, 2004	Socorro	LINEAR	·	1.0 km	MPC · JPL
265237	2004 DE_{51}	—	February 23, 2004	Socorro	LINEAR	·	1.0 km	MPC · JPL
265238	2004 DO_{51}	—	February 23, 2004	Socorro	LINEAR	·	1.3 km	MPC · JPL
265239	2004 DV_{61}	—	February 27, 2004	Socorro	LINEAR	·	2.5 km	MPC · JPL
265240	2004 EM_{13}	—	March 11, 2004	Palomar	NEAT	·	920 m	MPC · JPL
265241	2004 ES_{15}	—	March 12, 2004	Palomar	NEAT	NYS	1.4 km	MPC · JPL
265242	2004 EG_{21}	—	March 15, 2004	Kitt Peak	Spacewatch	·	1.4 km	MPC · JPL
265243	2004 EE_{23}	—	March 15, 2004	Catalina	CSS	NYS	1.4 km	MPC · JPL
265244	2004 EK_{23}	—	March 15, 2004	Socorro	LINEAR	·	1.4 km	MPC · JPL
265245	2004 EO_{28}	—	March 15, 2004	Kitt Peak	Spacewatch	NYS	1.1 km	MPC · JPL
265246	2004 EB_{37}	—	March 13, 2004	Palomar	NEAT	NYS	1.4 km	MPC · JPL
265247	2004 EK_{38}	—	March 14, 2004	Kitt Peak	Spacewatch	V	1.0 km	MPC · JPL
265248	2004 EP_{39}	—	March 15, 2004	Kitt Peak	Spacewatch	·	1.1 km	MPC · JPL
265249	2004 ES_{40}	—	March 15, 2004	Kitt Peak	Spacewatch	·	1.2 km	MPC · JPL
265250	2004 EW_{40}	—	March 15, 2004	Catalina	CSS	NYS	1.6 km	MPC · JPL
265251	2004 ED_{46}	—	March 15, 2004	Socorro	LINEAR	V	830 m	MPC · JPL
265252	2004 EG_{47}	—	March 15, 2004	Kitt Peak	Spacewatch	NYS	1.1 km	MPC · JPL
265253	2004 EB_{66}	—	March 14, 2004	Kitt Peak	Spacewatch	NYS	1.4 km	MPC · JPL
265254	2004 ES_{66}	—	March 14, 2004	Catalina	CSS	·	1.6 km	MPC · JPL
265255	2004 EN_{67}	—	March 15, 2004	Kitt Peak	Spacewatch	·	1.3 km	MPC · JPL
265256	2004 ES_{74}	—	March 13, 2004	Palomar	NEAT	·	1.6 km	MPC · JPL
265257	2004 EB_{76}	—	March 15, 2004	Palomar	NEAT	·	8.2 km	MPC · JPL
265258	2004 ED_{76}	—	March 15, 2004	Catalina	CSS	·	1.2 km	MPC · JPL
265259	2004 EW_{82}	—	March 13, 2004	Palomar	NEAT	·	3.2 km	MPC · JPL
265260	2004 EK_{90}	—	March 14, 2004	Kitt Peak	Spacewatch	NYS	1.2 km	MPC · JPL
265261	2004 EF_{94}	—	March 15, 2004	Catalina	CSS	·	1.2 km	MPC · JPL
265262	2004 EL_{95}	—	March 15, 2004	Kitt Peak	Spacewatch	CLA	2.0 km	MPC · JPL
265263	2004 FT_{3}	—	March 19, 2004	Palomar	NEAT	PHO	1.1 km	MPC · JPL
265264	2004 FO_{7}	—	March 16, 2004	Kitt Peak	Spacewatch	·	1.4 km	MPC · JPL
265265	2004 FT_{21}	—	March 16, 2004	Kitt Peak	Spacewatch	·	1.2 km	MPC · JPL
265266	2004 FO_{23}	—	March 17, 2004	Kitt Peak	Spacewatch	·	1.6 km	MPC · JPL
265267	2004 FU_{25}	—	March 17, 2004	Socorro	LINEAR	·	1.2 km	MPC · JPL
265268	2004 FL_{27}	—	March 17, 2004	Kitt Peak	Spacewatch	3:2	5.3 km	MPC · JPL
265269	2004 FC_{36}	—	March 16, 2004	Socorro	LINEAR	NYS	1.1 km	MPC · JPL
265270	2004 FL_{37}	—	March 17, 2004	Kitt Peak	Spacewatch	MAS	900 m	MPC · JPL
265271	2004 FT_{38}	—	March 17, 2004	Socorro	LINEAR	·	1.9 km	MPC · JPL
265272	2004 FF_{41}	—	March 18, 2004	Socorro	LINEAR	·	1.5 km	MPC · JPL
265273	2004 FP_{41}	—	March 18, 2004	Kitt Peak	Spacewatch	NYS	1.7 km	MPC · JPL
265274	2004 FL_{45}	—	March 16, 2004	Socorro	LINEAR	·	1.5 km	MPC · JPL
265275	2004 FP_{48}	—	March 18, 2004	Socorro	LINEAR	·	1.1 km	MPC · JPL
265276	2004 FE_{50}	—	March 18, 2004	Socorro	LINEAR	NYS	1.1 km	MPC · JPL
265277	2004 FD_{52}	—	March 19, 2004	Socorro	LINEAR	·	1.3 km	MPC · JPL
265278	2004 FP_{69}	—	March 16, 2004	Kitt Peak	Spacewatch	NYS	1.3 km	MPC · JPL
265279	2004 FE_{70}	—	March 16, 2004	Kitt Peak	Spacewatch	NYS	1.2 km	MPC · JPL
265280	2004 FU_{80}	—	March 16, 2004	Socorro	LINEAR	·	1.8 km	MPC · JPL
265281	2004 FY_{82}	—	March 17, 2004	Socorro	LINEAR	·	2.2 km	MPC · JPL
265282	2004 FB_{94}	—	March 22, 2004	Socorro	LINEAR	·	1.5 km	MPC · JPL
265283	2004 FL_{124}	—	March 27, 2004	Socorro	LINEAR	·	1.3 km	MPC · JPL
265284	2004 FY_{124}	—	March 27, 2004	Socorro	LINEAR	·	1.2 km	MPC · JPL
265285	2004 FY_{134}	—	March 26, 2004	Anderson Mesa	LONEOS	V	1.1 km	MPC · JPL
265286	2004 FT_{136}	—	March 28, 2004	Socorro	LINEAR	·	1.8 km	MPC · JPL
265287	2004 FR_{145}	—	March 30, 2004	Kitt Peak	Spacewatch	slow	1.5 km	MPC · JPL
265288	2004 GP_{4}	—	April 11, 2004	Palomar	NEAT	NYS	1.2 km	MPC · JPL
265289	2004 GO_{31}	—	April 15, 2004	Anderson Mesa	LONEOS	·	1.3 km	MPC · JPL
265290	2004 GV_{32}	—	April 12, 2004	Palomar	NEAT	NYS	1.4 km	MPC · JPL
265291	2004 GG_{37}	—	April 14, 2004	Anderson Mesa	LONEOS	·	4.6 km	MPC · JPL
265292	2004 GC_{38}	—	April 14, 2004	Anderson Mesa	LONEOS	·	1.7 km	MPC · JPL
265293	2004 GL_{38}	—	April 15, 2004	Catalina	CSS	·	1.8 km	MPC · JPL
265294	2004 GO_{51}	—	April 13, 2004	Kitt Peak	Spacewatch	L4	10 km	MPC · JPL
265295	2004 GO_{56}	—	April 13, 2004	Kitt Peak	Spacewatch	NYS	1.3 km	MPC · JPL
265296	2004 GM_{57}	—	April 14, 2004	Kitt Peak	Spacewatch	MAS	890 m	MPC · JPL
265297	2004 GY_{58}	—	April 12, 2004	Anderson Mesa	LONEOS	NYS	1.5 km	MPC · JPL
265298	2004 GH_{59}	—	April 12, 2004	Palomar	NEAT	NYS	1.7 km	MPC · JPL
265299	2004 GK_{60}	—	April 14, 2004	Anderson Mesa	LONEOS	·	1.8 km	MPC · JPL
265300	2004 GB_{74}	—	April 12, 2004	Anderson Mesa	LONEOS	·	1.2 km	MPC · JPL

== 265301–265400 ==
back to top

Designation			Discovery			Properties		Ref
Permanent	Provisional	Named after	Date	Site	Discoverer(s)	Category	Diam.	Ref
265301	2004 GQ_{74}	—	April 15, 2004	Socorro	LINEAR	·	1.1 km	MPC · JPL
265302	2004 HE_{4}	—	April 16, 2004	Socorro	LINEAR	·	1.7 km	MPC · JPL
265303	2004 HT_{7}	—	April 19, 2004	Socorro	LINEAR	NYS	1.2 km	MPC · JPL
265304	2004 HZ_{25}	—	April 19, 2004	Socorro	LINEAR	PHO	1.3 km	MPC · JPL
265305	2004 HN_{28}	—	April 20, 2004	Socorro	LINEAR	·	1.8 km	MPC · JPL
265306	2004 HJ_{36}	—	April 21, 2004	Socorro	LINEAR	·	2.1 km	MPC · JPL
265307	2004 HG_{44}	—	April 21, 2004	Socorro	LINEAR	V	990 m	MPC · JPL
265308	2004 HU_{68}	—	April 22, 2004	Kitt Peak	Spacewatch	·	1.5 km	MPC · JPL
265309	2004 JW_{8}	—	May 13, 2004	Kitt Peak	Spacewatch	·	1.2 km	MPC · JPL
265310	2004 JW_{13}	—	May 9, 2004	Kitt Peak	Spacewatch	MAS	1.1 km	MPC · JPL
265311	2004 JV_{43}	—	May 12, 2004	Anderson Mesa	LONEOS	NYS	1.4 km	MPC · JPL
265312	2004 JB_{44}	—	May 12, 2004	Anderson Mesa	LONEOS	·	1.8 km	MPC · JPL
265313	2004 KZ_{6}	—	May 19, 2004	Kitt Peak	Spacewatch	·	1.8 km	MPC · JPL
265314	2004 KL_{13}	—	May 19, 2004	Kitt Peak	Spacewatch	·	1.7 km	MPC · JPL
265315	2004 NM	—	July 9, 2004	Palomar	NEAT	·	2.9 km	MPC · JPL
265316	2004 NH_{1}	—	July 9, 2004	Palomar	NEAT	·	4.2 km	MPC · JPL
265317	2004 NV_{6}	—	July 11, 2004	Socorro	LINEAR	·	3.1 km	MPC · JPL
265318	2004 NZ_{7}	—	July 11, 2004	Socorro	LINEAR	·	3.5 km	MPC · JPL
265319	2004 NV_{8}	—	July 14, 2004	Reedy Creek	J. Broughton	EUN	1.8 km	MPC · JPL
265320	2004 NJ_{14}	—	July 11, 2004	Socorro	LINEAR	·	2.0 km	MPC · JPL
265321	2004 NG_{15}	—	July 11, 2004	Socorro	LINEAR	·	2.5 km	MPC · JPL
265322	2004 NB_{17}	—	July 11, 2004	Socorro	LINEAR	·	2.5 km	MPC · JPL
265323	2004 NA_{23}	—	July 11, 2004	Socorro	LINEAR	·	3.8 km	MPC · JPL
265324	2004 NF_{24}	—	July 14, 2004	Socorro	LINEAR	·	2.6 km	MPC · JPL
265325	2004 NS_{24}	—	July 15, 2004	Socorro	LINEAR	·	3.4 km	MPC · JPL
265326	2004 NP_{28}	—	July 14, 2004	Socorro	LINEAR	·	3.7 km	MPC · JPL
265327	2004 OS	—	July 17, 2004	7300	W. K. Y. Yeung	526	2.9 km	MPC · JPL
265328	2004 OG_{1}	—	July 16, 2004	Socorro	LINEAR	·	1.7 km	MPC · JPL
265329	2004 PC_{10}	—	August 6, 2004	Campo Imperatore	CINEOS	·	1.7 km	MPC · JPL
265330	2004 PS_{11}	—	August 7, 2004	Palomar	NEAT	·	3.2 km	MPC · JPL
265331	2004 PH_{16}	—	August 7, 2004	Palomar	NEAT	·	2.6 km	MPC · JPL
265332	2004 PA_{18}	—	August 8, 2004	Socorro	LINEAR	·	4.1 km	MPC · JPL
265333	2004 PN_{37}	—	August 9, 2004	Anderson Mesa	LONEOS	·	2.0 km	MPC · JPL
265334	2004 PZ_{38}	—	August 9, 2004	Anderson Mesa	LONEOS	H	790 m	MPC · JPL
265335	2004 PO_{39}	—	August 9, 2004	Socorro	LINEAR	·	3.2 km	MPC · JPL
265336	2004 PP_{43}	—	August 6, 2004	Palomar	NEAT	·	2.9 km	MPC · JPL
265337	2004 PE_{52}	—	August 8, 2004	Socorro	LINEAR	·	2.8 km	MPC · JPL
265338	2004 PM_{58}	—	August 9, 2004	Socorro	LINEAR	MAR	1.6 km	MPC · JPL
265339	2004 PJ_{63}	—	August 10, 2004	Socorro	LINEAR	·	2.8 km	MPC · JPL
265340	2004 PR_{72}	—	August 8, 2004	Socorro	LINEAR	·	2.6 km	MPC · JPL
265341	2004 PV_{88}	—	August 8, 2004	Palomar	NEAT	·	2.0 km	MPC · JPL
265342	2004 QQ_{3}	—	August 19, 2004	Socorro	LINEAR	·	2.8 km	MPC · JPL
265343	2004 QJ_{12}	—	August 21, 2004	Siding Spring	SSS	·	3.9 km	MPC · JPL
265344	2004 RB_{4}	—	September 4, 2004	Palomar	NEAT	·	3.2 km	MPC · JPL
265345	2004 RT_{20}	—	September 7, 2004	Kitt Peak	Spacewatch	·	2.3 km	MPC · JPL
265346	2004 RH_{25}	—	September 6, 2004	Siding Spring	SSS	·	1.8 km	MPC · JPL
265347	2004 RV_{38}	—	September 7, 2004	Palomar	NEAT	·	2.5 km	MPC · JPL
265348	2004 RB_{48}	—	September 8, 2004	Socorro	LINEAR	·	2.3 km	MPC · JPL
265349	2004 RY_{50}	—	September 8, 2004	Socorro	LINEAR	AGN	1.8 km	MPC · JPL
265350	2004 RG_{59}	—	September 8, 2004	Socorro	LINEAR	·	2.4 km	MPC · JPL
265351	2004 RT_{59}	—	September 8, 2004	Socorro	LINEAR	·	3.1 km	MPC · JPL
265352	2004 RL_{61}	—	September 8, 2004	Socorro	LINEAR	·	3.1 km	MPC · JPL
265353	2004 RH_{75}	—	September 8, 2004	Socorro	LINEAR	·	2.7 km	MPC · JPL
265354	2004 RR_{78}	—	September 8, 2004	Socorro	LINEAR	·	2.0 km	MPC · JPL
265355	2004 RF_{83}	—	September 9, 2004	Socorro	LINEAR	AGN	1.6 km	MPC · JPL
265356	2004 RE_{87}	—	September 7, 2004	Socorro	LINEAR	EUN	1.9 km	MPC · JPL
265357	2004 RJ_{91}	—	September 8, 2004	Socorro	LINEAR	·	4.0 km	MPC · JPL
265358	2004 RH_{93}	—	September 8, 2004	Socorro	LINEAR	·	2.5 km	MPC · JPL
265359	2004 RB_{95}	—	September 8, 2004	Socorro	LINEAR	·	2.6 km	MPC · JPL
265360	2004 RC_{101}	—	September 8, 2004	Socorro	LINEAR	NEM	3.3 km	MPC · JPL
265361	2004 RF_{112}	—	September 6, 2004	Socorro	LINEAR	·	4.2 km	MPC · JPL
265362	2004 RZ_{118}	—	September 7, 2004	Palomar	NEAT	·	2.3 km	MPC · JPL
265363	2004 RZ_{125}	—	September 7, 2004	Kitt Peak	Spacewatch	·	2.1 km	MPC · JPL
265364	2004 RS_{133}	—	September 7, 2004	Kitt Peak	Spacewatch	·	2.0 km	MPC · JPL
265365	2004 RW_{151}	—	September 9, 2004	Socorro	LINEAR	T_{j} (2.89)	5.6 km	MPC · JPL
265366	2004 RK_{158}	—	September 10, 2004	Socorro	LINEAR	VER	4.4 km	MPC · JPL
265367	2004 RZ_{159}	—	September 10, 2004	Socorro	LINEAR	·	2.8 km	MPC · JPL
265368	2004 RZ_{180}	—	September 10, 2004	Socorro	LINEAR	·	3.1 km	MPC · JPL
265369	2004 RJ_{181}	—	September 10, 2004	Socorro	LINEAR	MRX	1.8 km	MPC · JPL
265370	2004 RC_{188}	—	September 10, 2004	Socorro	LINEAR	·	2.6 km	MPC · JPL
265371	2004 RT_{195}	—	September 10, 2004	Socorro	LINEAR	EOS	2.7 km	MPC · JPL
265372	2004 RD_{211}	—	September 11, 2004	Socorro	LINEAR	·	3.0 km	MPC · JPL
265373	2004 RU_{215}	—	September 11, 2004	Socorro	LINEAR	·	3.9 km	MPC · JPL
265374	2004 RL_{224}	—	September 8, 2004	Palomar	NEAT	H	860 m	MPC · JPL
265375	2004 RP_{225}	—	September 9, 2004	Socorro	LINEAR	KOR	2.1 km	MPC · JPL
265376	2004 RG_{227}	—	September 9, 2004	Kitt Peak	Spacewatch	EUN	1.8 km	MPC · JPL
265377	2004 RY_{240}	—	September 10, 2004	Kitt Peak	Spacewatch	·	2.1 km	MPC · JPL
265378	2004 RY_{247}	—	September 12, 2004	Socorro	LINEAR	H	700 m	MPC · JPL
265379	2004 RV_{248}	—	September 12, 2004	Socorro	LINEAR	H	700 m	MPC · JPL
265380 Terzan	2004 RD_{253}	Terzan	September 15, 2004	Mauna Kea	Pittichová, J.	·	1.9 km	MPC · JPL
265381	2004 RJ_{269}	—	September 11, 2004	Kitt Peak	Spacewatch	(12739)	2.0 km	MPC · JPL
265382	2004 RN_{271}	—	September 11, 2004	Kitt Peak	Spacewatch	AGN	1.4 km	MPC · JPL
265383	2004 RS_{291}	—	September 10, 2004	Socorro	LINEAR	·	2.7 km	MPC · JPL
265384	2004 RE_{296}	—	September 11, 2004	Kitt Peak	Spacewatch	KOR	1.3 km	MPC · JPL
265385	2004 RE_{298}	—	September 11, 2004	Kitt Peak	Spacewatch	·	2.8 km	MPC · JPL
265386	2004 RR_{298}	—	September 11, 2004	Kitt Peak	Spacewatch	KOR	1.4 km	MPC · JPL
265387	2004 RW_{319}	—	September 13, 2004	Socorro	LINEAR	·	4.5 km	MPC · JPL
265388	2004 RZ_{323}	—	September 13, 2004	Socorro	LINEAR	·	2.6 km	MPC · JPL
265389	2004 RV_{345}	—	September 8, 2004	Socorro	LINEAR	·	3.2 km	MPC · JPL
265390	2004 SN_{8}	—	September 17, 2004	Socorro	LINEAR	·	2.7 km	MPC · JPL
265391	2004 SS_{21}	—	September 16, 2004	Kitt Peak	Spacewatch	·	3.0 km	MPC · JPL
265392	2004 SQ_{30}	—	September 17, 2004	Socorro	LINEAR	·	2.5 km	MPC · JPL
265393	2004 SM_{46}	—	September 18, 2004	Socorro	LINEAR	(32418)	2.7 km	MPC · JPL
265394	2004 SS_{56}	—	September 16, 2004	Anderson Mesa	LONEOS	·	3.6 km	MPC · JPL
265395	2004 TM_{4}	—	October 4, 2004	Kitt Peak	Spacewatch	·	2.4 km	MPC · JPL
265396	2004 TS_{15}	—	October 9, 2004	Kitt Peak	Spacewatch	·	2.6 km	MPC · JPL
265397	2004 TR_{17}	—	October 11, 2004	Palomar	NEAT	H	670 m	MPC · JPL
265398	2004 TR_{18}	—	October 14, 2004	Goodricke-Pigott	R. A. Tucker	·	3.0 km	MPC · JPL
265399	2004 TK_{20}	—	October 15, 2004	Socorro	LINEAR	EUP	3.9 km	MPC · JPL
265400	2004 TB_{28}	—	October 4, 2004	Kitt Peak	Spacewatch	AST	3.1 km	MPC · JPL

== 265401–265500 ==
back to top

Designation			Discovery			Properties		Ref
Permanent	Provisional	Named after	Date	Site	Discoverer(s)	Category	Diam.	Ref
265401	2004 TO_{37}	—	October 4, 2004	Kitt Peak	Spacewatch	KOR	1.4 km	MPC · JPL
265402	2004 TG_{47}	—	October 4, 2004	Kitt Peak	Spacewatch	·	2.3 km	MPC · JPL
265403	2004 TK_{57}	—	October 5, 2004	Kitt Peak	Spacewatch	KOR	1.5 km	MPC · JPL
265404	2004 TA_{60}	—	October 5, 2004	Kitt Peak	Spacewatch	·	2.0 km	MPC · JPL
265405	2004 TE_{76}	—	October 7, 2004	Anderson Mesa	LONEOS	·	2.6 km	MPC · JPL
265406	2004 TE_{77}	—	October 7, 2004	Kitt Peak	Spacewatch	(16286)	2.3 km	MPC · JPL
265407	2004 TP_{79}	—	October 4, 2004	Kitt Peak	Spacewatch	·	4.4 km	MPC · JPL
265408	2004 TK_{82}	—	October 5, 2004	Kitt Peak	Spacewatch	·	2.9 km	MPC · JPL
265409	2004 TL_{90}	—	October 5, 2004	Kitt Peak	Spacewatch	·	2.7 km	MPC · JPL
265410	2004 TA_{115}	—	October 8, 2004	Palomar	NEAT	·	3.2 km	MPC · JPL
265411	2004 TQ_{125}	—	October 7, 2004	Socorro	LINEAR	·	2.1 km	MPC · JPL
265412	2004 TY_{151}	—	October 6, 2004	Kitt Peak	Spacewatch	KOR	1.7 km	MPC · JPL
265413	2004 TX_{153}	—	October 6, 2004	Kitt Peak	Spacewatch	THM	2.7 km	MPC · JPL
265414	2004 TG_{157}	—	October 6, 2004	Kitt Peak	Spacewatch	·	1.9 km	MPC · JPL
265415	2004 TM_{167}	—	October 7, 2004	Kitt Peak	Spacewatch	KOR	1.4 km	MPC · JPL
265416	2004 TO_{172}	—	October 8, 2004	Socorro	LINEAR	·	2.9 km	MPC · JPL
265417	2004 TP_{172}	—	October 8, 2004	Socorro	LINEAR	·	4.7 km	MPC · JPL
265418	2004 TJ_{176}	—	October 9, 2004	Socorro	LINEAR	·	2.8 km	MPC · JPL
265419	2004 TH_{259}	—	October 9, 2004	Kitt Peak	Spacewatch	·	2.1 km	MPC · JPL
265420	2004 TD_{268}	—	October 9, 2004	Kitt Peak	Spacewatch	·	2.1 km	MPC · JPL
265421	2004 TG_{281}	—	October 10, 2004	Kitt Peak	Spacewatch	·	3.3 km	MPC · JPL
265422	2004 TN_{281}	—	October 11, 2004	Kitt Peak	Spacewatch	·	2.5 km	MPC · JPL
265423	2004 TA_{293}	—	October 10, 2004	Kitt Peak	Spacewatch	·	2.2 km	MPC · JPL
265424	2004 TZ_{328}	—	October 4, 2004	Palomar	NEAT	·	4.1 km	MPC · JPL
265425	2004 TO_{354}	—	October 11, 2004	Kitt Peak	M. W. Buie	·	2.0 km	MPC · JPL
265426	2004 UB_{1}	—	October 19, 2004	Hormersdorf	Hormersdorf	·	4.5 km	MPC · JPL
265427	2004 UD_{11}	—	October 18, 2004	Socorro	LINEAR	·	3.0 km	MPC · JPL
265428	2004 VE_{35}	—	November 3, 2004	Kitt Peak	Spacewatch	KOR	1.6 km	MPC · JPL
265429	2004 VG_{42}	—	November 4, 2004	Kitt Peak	Spacewatch	·	1.7 km	MPC · JPL
265430	2004 VD_{49}	—	November 4, 2004	Kitt Peak	Spacewatch	·	3.4 km	MPC · JPL
265431	2004 VW_{57}	—	November 7, 2004	Palomar	NEAT	·	4.1 km	MPC · JPL
265432	2004 VL_{62}	—	November 6, 2004	Socorro	LINEAR	·	4.6 km	MPC · JPL
265433	2004 VJ_{70}	—	November 4, 2004	Catalina	CSS	·	5.0 km	MPC · JPL
265434	2004 VK_{71}	—	November 9, 2004	Catalina	CSS	·	2.6 km	MPC · JPL
265435	2004 VG_{85}	—	November 10, 2004	Kitt Peak	Spacewatch	·	3.3 km	MPC · JPL
265436	2004 VL_{86}	—	November 10, 2004	Kitt Peak	Spacewatch	·	3.0 km	MPC · JPL
265437	2004 VC_{112}	—	November 12, 2004	Socorro	LINEAR	·	3.8 km	MPC · JPL
265438	2004 XN_{2}	—	December 1, 2004	Palomar	NEAT	·	3.9 km	MPC · JPL
265439	2004 XX_{18}	—	December 8, 2004	Socorro	LINEAR	·	3.4 km	MPC · JPL
265440	2004 XA_{26}	—	December 9, 2004	Kitt Peak	Spacewatch	·	5.9 km	MPC · JPL
265441	2004 XS_{34}	—	December 11, 2004	Kitt Peak	Spacewatch	·	4.3 km	MPC · JPL
265442	2004 XY_{38}	—	December 7, 2004	Socorro	LINEAR	TIR	3.7 km	MPC · JPL
265443	2004 XA_{42}	—	December 11, 2004	Kitt Peak	Spacewatch	·	4.5 km	MPC · JPL
265444	2004 XS_{63}	—	December 2, 2004	Kitt Peak	Spacewatch	·	4.5 km	MPC · JPL
265445	2004 XD_{80}	—	December 10, 2004	Anderson Mesa	LONEOS	EUP	7.9 km	MPC · JPL
265446	2004 XV_{82}	—	December 11, 2004	Kitt Peak	Spacewatch	VER	4.9 km	MPC · JPL
265447	2004 XD_{84}	—	December 11, 2004	Kitt Peak	Spacewatch	·	4.5 km	MPC · JPL
265448	2004 XD_{91}	—	December 11, 2004	Kitt Peak	Spacewatch	THM	2.8 km	MPC · JPL
265449	2004 XL_{97}	—	December 11, 2004	Kitt Peak	Spacewatch	·	4.3 km	MPC · JPL
265450	2004 XC_{99}	—	December 11, 2004	Kitt Peak	Spacewatch	·	4.4 km	MPC · JPL
265451	2004 XL_{100}	—	December 13, 2004	Kitt Peak	Spacewatch	·	5.5 km	MPC · JPL
265452	2004 XV_{109}	—	December 13, 2004	Anderson Mesa	LONEOS	·	7.0 km	MPC · JPL
265453	2004 XV_{121}	—	December 15, 2004	Socorro	LINEAR	·	3.5 km	MPC · JPL
265454	2004 XA_{124}	—	December 10, 2004	Socorro	LINEAR	·	4.4 km	MPC · JPL
265455	2004 XC_{140}	—	December 13, 2004	Kitt Peak	Spacewatch	·	4.3 km	MPC · JPL
265456	2004 XU_{167}	—	December 3, 2004	Kitt Peak	Spacewatch	·	4.6 km	MPC · JPL
265457	2004 XV_{180}	—	December 14, 2004	Kitt Peak	Spacewatch	EOS	2.9 km	MPC · JPL
265458	2004 YM_{18}	—	December 18, 2004	Mount Lemmon	Mount Lemmon Survey	·	4.5 km	MPC · JPL
265459	2004 YQ_{32}	—	December 21, 2004	Catalina	CSS	·	6.3 km	MPC · JPL
265460	2005 AG_{12}	—	January 6, 2005	Catalina	CSS	·	4.8 km	MPC · JPL
265461	2005 AX_{13}	—	January 7, 2005	Socorro	LINEAR	T_{j} (2.99) · EUP	6.0 km	MPC · JPL
265462	2005 AQ_{14}	—	January 1, 2005	Catalina	CSS	·	3.7 km	MPC · JPL
265463	2005 AS_{19}	—	January 6, 2005	Catalina	CSS	·	3.6 km	MPC · JPL
265464	2005 AC_{34}	—	January 13, 2005	Socorro	LINEAR	·	4.7 km	MPC · JPL
265465	2005 AZ_{36}	—	January 13, 2005	Socorro	LINEAR	·	5.4 km	MPC · JPL
265466	2005 AH_{39}	—	January 13, 2005	Socorro	LINEAR	T_{j} (2.98) · CYB	5.4 km	MPC · JPL
265467	2005 AN_{49}	—	January 13, 2005	Socorro	LINEAR	EOS	4.8 km	MPC · JPL
265468	2005 AG_{55}	—	January 15, 2005	Socorro	LINEAR	EOS	3.8 km	MPC · JPL
265469	2005 AA_{57}	—	January 15, 2005	Catalina	CSS	·	4.1 km	MPC · JPL
265470	2005 AB_{60}	—	January 15, 2005	Kitt Peak	Spacewatch	·	4.3 km	MPC · JPL
265471	2005 AE_{62}	—	January 15, 2005	Kitt Peak	Spacewatch	(21885)	4.2 km	MPC · JPL
265472	2005 AC_{64}	—	January 13, 2005	Kitt Peak	Spacewatch	(8737)	6.4 km	MPC · JPL
265473	2005 BL_{9}	—	January 16, 2005	Socorro	LINEAR	·	4.1 km	MPC · JPL
265474	2005 BB_{14}	—	January 16, 2005	Socorro	LINEAR	·	1.2 km	MPC · JPL
265475	2005 BA_{18}	—	January 16, 2005	Socorro	LINEAR	·	6.0 km	MPC · JPL
265476	2005 BE_{19}	—	January 16, 2005	Socorro	LINEAR	T_{j} (2.99)	4.5 km	MPC · JPL
265477	2005 BD_{25}	—	January 17, 2005	Socorro	LINEAR	·	5.4 km	MPC · JPL
265478	2005 CK_{17}	—	February 2, 2005	Socorro	LINEAR	·	4.2 km	MPC · JPL
265479	2005 CG_{64}	—	February 9, 2005	Socorro	LINEAR	·	4.4 km	MPC · JPL
265480	2005 CQ_{64}	—	February 9, 2005	Anderson Mesa	LONEOS	·	4.0 km	MPC · JPL
265481	2005 CR_{69}	—	February 14, 2005	Socorro	LINEAR	VER	4.6 km	MPC · JPL
265482	2005 EE	—	March 1, 2005	Catalina	CSS	APO · PHA	200 m	MPC · JPL
265483	2005 EC_{5}	—	March 1, 2005	Kitt Peak	Spacewatch	·	5.8 km	MPC · JPL
265484	2005 EF_{9}	—	March 2, 2005	Kitt Peak	Spacewatch	·	4.2 km	MPC · JPL
265485	2005 EP_{42}	—	March 2, 2005	Catalina	CSS	·	4.4 km	MPC · JPL
265486	2005 EV_{120}	—	March 8, 2005	Kitt Peak	Spacewatch	EUP	6.0 km	MPC · JPL
265487	2005 EU_{124}	—	March 8, 2005	Socorro	LINEAR	·	4.8 km	MPC · JPL
265488	2005 EQ_{195}	—	March 11, 2005	Mount Lemmon	Mount Lemmon Survey	·	920 m	MPC · JPL
265489	2005 EC_{253}	—	March 10, 2005	Catalina	CSS	·	1.1 km	MPC · JPL
265490 Szabados	2005 GW	Szabados	April 1, 2005	Piszkéstető	K. Sárneczky	·	1.1 km	MPC · JPL
265491	2005 GF_{11}	—	April 1, 2005	Anderson Mesa	LONEOS	T_{j} (2.98)	6.6 km	MPC · JPL
265492	2005 GA_{13}	—	April 1, 2005	Anderson Mesa	LONEOS	CYB	8.0 km	MPC · JPL
265493	2005 GE_{20}	—	April 2, 2005	Palomar	NEAT	·	890 m	MPC · JPL
265494	2005 GZ_{51}	—	April 2, 2005	Mount Lemmon	Mount Lemmon Survey	·	800 m	MPC · JPL
265495	2005 GC_{89}	—	April 5, 2005	Mount Lemmon	Mount Lemmon Survey	·	710 m	MPC · JPL
265496	2005 GX_{98}	—	April 7, 2005	Kitt Peak	Spacewatch	·	740 m	MPC · JPL
265497	2005 GB_{142}	—	April 10, 2005	Kitt Peak	Spacewatch	·	750 m	MPC · JPL
265498	2005 GH_{151}	—	April 11, 2005	Kitt Peak	Spacewatch	(2076)	950 m	MPC · JPL
265499	2005 GH_{176}	—	April 14, 2005	Kitt Peak	Spacewatch	·	690 m	MPC · JPL
265500	2005 JZ	—	May 3, 2005	Socorro	LINEAR	TIR	3.9 km	MPC · JPL

== 265501–265600 ==
back to top

Designation			Discovery			Properties		Ref
Permanent	Provisional	Named after	Date	Site	Discoverer(s)	Category	Diam.	Ref
265501	2005 JR_{12}	—	May 4, 2005	Mauna Kea	Veillet, C.	·	820 m	MPC · JPL
265502	2005 JS_{14}	—	May 2, 2005	Kitt Peak	Spacewatch	·	3.5 km	MPC · JPL
265503	2005 JH_{48}	—	May 3, 2005	Kitt Peak	Spacewatch	·	920 m	MPC · JPL
265504	2005 JT_{50}	—	May 4, 2005	Kitt Peak	Spacewatch	·	890 m	MPC · JPL
265505	2005 JK_{52}	—	May 4, 2005	Kitt Peak	Spacewatch	·	1.3 km	MPC · JPL
265506	2005 JK_{55}	—	May 4, 2005	Kitt Peak	Spacewatch	·	1.9 km	MPC · JPL
265507	2005 JJ_{56}	—	May 6, 2005	Kitt Peak	Spacewatch	·	2.5 km	MPC · JPL
265508	2005 JP_{79}	—	May 10, 2005	Mount Lemmon	Mount Lemmon Survey	·	1.0 km	MPC · JPL
265509	2005 JG_{92}	—	May 11, 2005	Palomar	NEAT	·	1.1 km	MPC · JPL
265510	2005 JE_{160}	—	May 7, 2005	Mount Lemmon	Mount Lemmon Survey	(2076)	970 m	MPC · JPL
265511	2005 JZ_{183}	—	May 14, 2005	Mount Lemmon	Mount Lemmon Survey	3:2	6.9 km	MPC · JPL
265512	2005 KG_{13}	—	May 20, 2005	Mount Lemmon	Mount Lemmon Survey	·	690 m	MPC · JPL
265513	2005 LF_{3}	—	June 2, 2005	Socorro	LINEAR	PHO	1.3 km	MPC · JPL
265514	2005 LQ_{22}	—	June 8, 2005	Kitt Peak	Spacewatch	NYS	800 m	MPC · JPL
265515	2005 LL_{24}	—	June 6, 2005	Kitt Peak	Spacewatch	·	1.2 km	MPC · JPL
265516	2005 LM_{53}	—	June 13, 2005	Mount Lemmon	Mount Lemmon Survey	(2076)	1.2 km	MPC · JPL
265517	2005 MK_{8}	—	June 27, 2005	Junk Bond	D. Healy	·	770 m	MPC · JPL
265518	2005 MF_{9}	—	June 28, 2005	Kitt Peak	Spacewatch	·	1.1 km	MPC · JPL
265519	2005 MN_{9}	—	June 28, 2005	Kitt Peak	Spacewatch	·	2.1 km	MPC · JPL
265520	2005 MT_{16}	—	June 27, 2005	Kitt Peak	Spacewatch	·	1.2 km	MPC · JPL
265521	2005 MG_{22}	—	June 30, 2005	Kitt Peak	Spacewatch	·	1.5 km	MPC · JPL
265522	2005 ML_{34}	—	June 29, 2005	Palomar	NEAT	·	1.4 km	MPC · JPL
265523	2005 MM_{37}	—	June 30, 2005	Kitt Peak	Spacewatch	·	1.3 km	MPC · JPL
265524	2005 MS_{39}	—	June 29, 2005	Palomar	NEAT	·	1.4 km	MPC · JPL
265525	2005 MD_{44}	—	June 27, 2005	Palomar	NEAT	·	840 m	MPC · JPL
265526	2005 NA	—	July 1, 2005	Wrightwood	J. W. Young	NYS	1.5 km	MPC · JPL
265527	2005 NC_{8}	—	July 1, 2005	Kitt Peak	Spacewatch	·	1.7 km	MPC · JPL
265528	2005 NZ_{20}	—	July 6, 2005	Reedy Creek	J. Broughton	·	2.1 km	MPC · JPL
265529	2005 NY_{21}	—	July 1, 2005	Kitt Peak	Spacewatch	·	1.0 km	MPC · JPL
265530	2005 NG_{33}	—	July 5, 2005	Kitt Peak	Spacewatch	NYS	1.6 km	MPC · JPL
265531	2005 NG_{34}	—	July 5, 2005	Kitt Peak	Spacewatch	·	870 m	MPC · JPL
265532	2005 NC_{38}	—	July 6, 2005	Kitt Peak	Spacewatch	·	820 m	MPC · JPL
265533	2005 ND_{42}	—	July 5, 2005	Kitt Peak	Spacewatch	·	1.4 km	MPC · JPL
265534	2005 NU_{60}	—	July 11, 2005	Mount Lemmon	Mount Lemmon Survey	·	1.1 km	MPC · JPL
265535	2005 NJ_{74}	—	July 9, 2005	Kitt Peak	Spacewatch	·	810 m	MPC · JPL
265536	2005 NO_{78}	—	July 12, 2005	Junk Bond	D. Healy	·	1.2 km	MPC · JPL
265537	2005 NO_{79}	—	July 7, 2005	Reedy Creek	J. Broughton	·	1.7 km	MPC · JPL
265538	2005 NB_{83}	—	July 15, 2005	Reedy Creek	J. Broughton	PHO	1.9 km	MPC · JPL
265539	2005 NQ_{89}	—	July 4, 2005	Palomar	NEAT	V	1.1 km	MPC · JPL
265540	2005 NZ_{121}	—	July 4, 2005	Palomar	NEAT	·	1.2 km	MPC · JPL
265541	2005 NF_{122}	—	July 3, 2005	Palomar	NEAT	·	1.6 km	MPC · JPL
265542	2005 OM_{2}	—	July 26, 2005	Palomar	NEAT	·	1.9 km	MPC · JPL
265543	2005 OM_{3}	—	July 26, 2005	Reedy Creek	J. Broughton	·	2.5 km	MPC · JPL
265544	2005 OU_{5}	—	July 28, 2005	Palomar	NEAT	·	1.7 km	MPC · JPL
265545	2005 OQ_{6}	—	July 28, 2005	Palomar	NEAT	·	1.7 km	MPC · JPL
265546	2005 OR_{10}	—	July 27, 2005	Palomar	NEAT	·	1.6 km	MPC · JPL
265547	2005 OP_{12}	—	July 29, 2005	Palomar	NEAT	·	1.4 km	MPC · JPL
265548	2005 OD_{14}	—	July 30, 2005	Palomar	NEAT	EUN	2.2 km	MPC · JPL
265549	2005 OZ_{14}	—	July 28, 2005	Reedy Creek	J. Broughton	·	900 m	MPC · JPL
265550	2005 OL_{19}	—	July 29, 2005	Needville	J. Dellinger, Wells, D.	·	1.4 km	MPC · JPL
265551	2005 OG_{21}	—	July 28, 2005	Palomar	NEAT	·	2.0 km	MPC · JPL
265552	2005 PW	—	August 1, 2005	Siding Spring	SSS	·	1.7 km	MPC · JPL
265553	2005 PO_{2}	—	August 2, 2005	Socorro	LINEAR	·	1.2 km	MPC · JPL
265554	2005 PG_{4}	—	August 4, 2005	Palomar	NEAT	·	1.1 km	MPC · JPL
265555	2005 PQ_{9}	—	August 4, 2005	Palomar	NEAT	(5)	1.3 km	MPC · JPL
265556	2005 PX_{9}	—	August 4, 2005	Palomar	NEAT	·	1.2 km	MPC · JPL
265557	2005 PC_{14}	—	August 4, 2005	Palomar	NEAT	NYS	1.5 km	MPC · JPL
265558	2005 PM_{23}	—	August 1, 2005	Siding Spring	SSS	·	1.1 km	MPC · JPL
265559	2005 PM_{24}	—	August 10, 2005	Cerro Tololo	M. W. Buie	(5)	1.0 km	MPC · JPL
265560	2005 QT_{5}	—	August 24, 2005	Palomar	NEAT	·	1.5 km	MPC · JPL
265561	2005 QW_{29}	—	August 26, 2005	Anderson Mesa	LONEOS	·	1.8 km	MPC · JPL
265562	2005 QF_{33}	—	August 25, 2005	Palomar	NEAT	·	1.5 km	MPC · JPL
265563	2005 QX_{33}	—	August 25, 2005	Palomar	NEAT	·	1.9 km	MPC · JPL
265564	2005 QT_{46}	—	August 26, 2005	Palomar	NEAT	MAS	870 m	MPC · JPL
265565	2005 QY_{46}	—	August 26, 2005	Palomar	NEAT	V	930 m	MPC · JPL
265566	2005 QD_{49}	—	August 26, 2005	Anderson Mesa	LONEOS	·	1.0 km	MPC · JPL
265567	2005 QA_{51}	—	August 26, 2005	Palomar	NEAT	·	1.4 km	MPC · JPL
265568	2005 QQ_{57}	—	August 24, 2005	Palomar	NEAT	·	1.6 km	MPC · JPL
265569	2005 QT_{65}	—	August 27, 2005	Anderson Mesa	LONEOS	ERI	2.1 km	MPC · JPL
265570	2005 QR_{76}	—	February 1, 2003	Kitt Peak	Spacewatch	KOR	1.7 km	MPC · JPL
265571	2005 QY_{90}	—	August 25, 2005	Palomar	NEAT	·	2.1 km	MPC · JPL
265572	2005 QX_{95}	—	August 27, 2005	Palomar	NEAT	MAS	770 m	MPC · JPL
265573	2005 QP_{101}	—	August 27, 2005	Palomar	NEAT	·	1.1 km	MPC · JPL
265574	2005 QQ_{108}	—	August 27, 2005	Palomar	NEAT	·	1.8 km	MPC · JPL
265575	2005 QQ_{113}	—	August 27, 2005	Palomar	NEAT	·	1.2 km	MPC · JPL
265576	2005 QK_{116}	—	August 28, 2005	Kitt Peak	Spacewatch	·	1.6 km	MPC · JPL
265577	2005 QC_{118}	—	August 28, 2005	Kitt Peak	Spacewatch	·	1.7 km	MPC · JPL
265578	2005 QH_{123}	—	August 28, 2005	Kitt Peak	Spacewatch	NYS	1.4 km	MPC · JPL
265579	2005 QO_{132}	—	August 28, 2005	Kitt Peak	Spacewatch	·	1.7 km	MPC · JPL
265580	2005 QT_{135}	—	August 28, 2005	Kitt Peak	Spacewatch	·	1.4 km	MPC · JPL
265581	2005 QU_{146}	—	August 28, 2005	Siding Spring	SSS	EUN	1.3 km	MPC · JPL
265582	2005 QY_{146}	—	August 28, 2005	Siding Spring	SSS	·	1.8 km	MPC · JPL
265583	2005 QS_{147}	—	August 28, 2005	Siding Spring	SSS	·	1.6 km	MPC · JPL
265584	2005 QZ_{147}	—	August 28, 2005	Siding Spring	SSS	·	1.6 km	MPC · JPL
265585	2005 QL_{153}	—	August 27, 2005	Anderson Mesa	LONEOS	·	1.8 km	MPC · JPL
265586	2005 QU_{153}	—	August 27, 2005	Palomar	NEAT	·	1.9 km	MPC · JPL
265587	2005 QP_{154}	—	August 28, 2005	Anderson Mesa	LONEOS	EUN	1.4 km	MPC · JPL
265588	2005 QF_{160}	—	August 28, 2005	Anderson Mesa	LONEOS	PHO	1.4 km	MPC · JPL
265589	2005 QK_{162}	—	August 30, 2005	Palomar	NEAT	·	1.8 km	MPC · JPL
265590	2005 QS_{165}	—	August 31, 2005	Palomar	NEAT	EUN	1.6 km	MPC · JPL
265591	2005 QB_{176}	—	August 31, 2005	Palomar	NEAT	·	2.1 km	MPC · JPL
265592	2005 QE_{189}	—	August 26, 2005	Palomar	NEAT	·	2.9 km	MPC · JPL
265593	2005 RO_{1}	—	September 1, 2005	Palomar	NEAT	·	1.3 km	MPC · JPL
265594 Keletiágnes	2005 RS_{3}	Keletiágnes	September 5, 2005	Piszkéstető	K. Sárneczky	·	1.3 km	MPC · JPL
265595	2005 RV_{10}	—	September 9, 2005	Socorro	LINEAR	EUN	1.3 km	MPC · JPL
265596	2005 RE_{17}	—	September 1, 2005	Kitt Peak	Spacewatch	·	1.5 km	MPC · JPL
265597	2005 RL_{20}	—	September 1, 2005	Palomar	NEAT	·	2.3 km	MPC · JPL
265598	2005 RP_{20}	—	September 1, 2005	Palomar	NEAT	MAR	1.4 km	MPC · JPL
265599	2005 RM_{23}	—	September 9, 2005	Socorro	LINEAR	·	1.7 km	MPC · JPL
265600	2005 RO_{27}	—	September 10, 2005	Anderson Mesa	LONEOS	·	2.4 km	MPC · JPL

== 265601–265700 ==
back to top

Designation			Discovery			Properties		Ref
Permanent	Provisional	Named after	Date	Site	Discoverer(s)	Category	Diam.	Ref
265601	2005 RP_{30}	—	September 10, 2005	Anderson Mesa	LONEOS	EUN	1.4 km	MPC · JPL
265602	2005 RE_{45}	—	September 10, 2005	Anderson Mesa	LONEOS	EUN	1.6 km	MPC · JPL
265603	2005 RW_{51}	—	September 13, 2005	Catalina	CSS	·	2.3 km	MPC · JPL
265604	2005 SK_{6}	—	September 23, 2005	Kitt Peak	Spacewatch	·	2.1 km	MPC · JPL
265605	2005 SZ_{6}	—	September 23, 2005	Kitt Peak	Spacewatch	JUN	1.5 km	MPC · JPL
265606	2005 SA_{12}	—	September 23, 2005	Kitt Peak	Spacewatch	·	1.3 km	MPC · JPL
265607	2005 SW_{27}	—	September 23, 2005	Kitt Peak	Spacewatch	slow	2.0 km	MPC · JPL
265608	2005 SU_{32}	—	September 23, 2005	Kitt Peak	Spacewatch	·	2.1 km	MPC · JPL
265609	2005 SU_{46}	—	September 24, 2005	Kitt Peak	Spacewatch	NEM	3.3 km	MPC · JPL
265610	2005 SY_{46}	—	September 24, 2005	Kitt Peak	Spacewatch	·	1.3 km	MPC · JPL
265611	2005 SE_{48}	—	September 24, 2005	Kitt Peak	Spacewatch	·	1.3 km	MPC · JPL
265612	2005 SK_{49}	—	September 24, 2005	Kitt Peak	Spacewatch	·	1.2 km	MPC · JPL
265613	2005 SL_{69}	—	September 27, 2005	Kitt Peak	Spacewatch	(5)	1.3 km	MPC · JPL
265614	2005 SL_{79}	—	September 24, 2005	Kitt Peak	Spacewatch	NYS	1.2 km	MPC · JPL
265615	2005 SY_{88}	—	September 24, 2005	Kitt Peak	Spacewatch	·	1.9 km	MPC · JPL
265616	2005 SC_{91}	—	September 24, 2005	Kitt Peak	Spacewatch	MAR	1.5 km	MPC · JPL
265617	2005 ST_{96}	—	September 25, 2005	Palomar	NEAT	·	2.7 km	MPC · JPL
265618	2005 SS_{117}	—	September 28, 2005	Palomar	NEAT	·	1.5 km	MPC · JPL
265619	2005 SQ_{119}	—	September 29, 2005	Mount Lemmon	Mount Lemmon Survey	V	830 m	MPC · JPL
265620	2005 SJ_{132}	—	September 29, 2005	Kitt Peak	Spacewatch	·	2.3 km	MPC · JPL
265621	2005 SR_{134}	—	September 30, 2005	Mount Lemmon	Mount Lemmon Survey	NYS	1.2 km	MPC · JPL
265622	2005 SJ_{138}	—	September 25, 2005	Palomar	NEAT	PHO	1.5 km	MPC · JPL
265623	2005 SA_{143}	—	September 25, 2005	Kitt Peak	Spacewatch	·	1.9 km	MPC · JPL
265624	2005 SE_{151}	—	September 25, 2005	Kitt Peak	Spacewatch	·	1.7 km	MPC · JPL
265625	2005 SC_{159}	—	September 26, 2005	Kitt Peak	Spacewatch	·	1.9 km	MPC · JPL
265626	2005 SL_{170}	—	September 29, 2005	Kitt Peak	Spacewatch	·	2.4 km	MPC · JPL
265627	2005 SN_{189}	—	September 29, 2005	Mount Lemmon	Mount Lemmon Survey	·	1.4 km	MPC · JPL
265628	2005 SB_{201}	—	September 30, 2005	Kitt Peak	Spacewatch	NYS	1.3 km	MPC · JPL
265629	2005 SL_{216}	—	September 30, 2005	Palomar	NEAT	·	2.5 km	MPC · JPL
265630	2005 SG_{220}	—	September 29, 2005	Catalina	CSS	·	1.9 km	MPC · JPL
265631	2005 SY_{221}	—	September 27, 2005	Socorro	LINEAR	·	2.1 km	MPC · JPL
265632	2005 SQ_{222}	—	September 29, 2005	Siding Spring	SSS	·	1.9 km	MPC · JPL
265633	2005 SE_{223}	—	September 28, 2005	Palomar	NEAT	·	1.6 km	MPC · JPL
265634	2005 SZ_{269}	—	September 29, 2005	Mount Lemmon	Mount Lemmon Survey	·	1.9 km	MPC · JPL
265635	2005 SH_{289}	—	September 23, 2005	Kitt Peak	Spacewatch	MAS	970 m	MPC · JPL
265636	2005 SJ_{289}	—	September 23, 2005	Kitt Peak	Spacewatch	·	1.5 km	MPC · JPL
265637	2005 SV_{289}	—	September 30, 2005	Mount Lemmon	Mount Lemmon Survey	·	2.0 km	MPC · JPL
265638	2005 TE_{22}	—	October 1, 2005	Mount Lemmon	Mount Lemmon Survey	·	1.5 km	MPC · JPL
265639	2005 TA_{24}	—	October 1, 2005	Kitt Peak	Spacewatch	·	1.7 km	MPC · JPL
265640	2005 TF_{25}	—	October 1, 2005	Mount Lemmon	Mount Lemmon Survey	·	1.9 km	MPC · JPL
265641	2005 TD_{39}	—	October 1, 2005	Catalina	CSS	(5)	1.4 km	MPC · JPL
265642	2005 TS_{42}	—	October 3, 2005	Palomar	NEAT	·	2.5 km	MPC · JPL
265643	2005 TM_{63}	—	October 5, 2005	Mount Lemmon	Mount Lemmon Survey	·	1.4 km	MPC · JPL
265644	2005 TZ_{63}	—	October 6, 2005	Catalina	CSS	·	1.5 km	MPC · JPL
265645	2005 TP_{72}	—	October 5, 2005	Catalina	CSS	·	1.7 km	MPC · JPL
265646	2005 TQ_{75}	—	October 3, 2005	Palomar	NEAT	·	2.8 km	MPC · JPL
265647	2005 TH_{98}	—	October 6, 2005	Kitt Peak	Spacewatch	·	1.2 km	MPC · JPL
265648	2005 TX_{103}	—	October 8, 2005	Socorro	LINEAR	(5)	1.7 km	MPC · JPL
265649	2005 TK_{105}	—	October 8, 2005	Socorro	LINEAR	EUN	1.9 km	MPC · JPL
265650	2005 TD_{118}	—	October 7, 2005	Kitt Peak	Spacewatch	NYS	1.7 km	MPC · JPL
265651	2005 TC_{121}	—	October 7, 2005	Kitt Peak	Spacewatch	·	1.3 km	MPC · JPL
265652	2005 TK_{121}	—	October 7, 2005	Catalina	CSS	·	1.4 km	MPC · JPL
265653	2005 TP_{132}	—	October 7, 2005	Kitt Peak	Spacewatch	·	1.3 km	MPC · JPL
265654	2005 TE_{133}	—	October 8, 2005	Catalina	CSS	·	2.3 km	MPC · JPL
265655	2005 TU_{135}	—	October 6, 2005	Kitt Peak	Spacewatch	·	2.1 km	MPC · JPL
265656	2005 TK_{143}	—	October 8, 2005	Kitt Peak	Spacewatch	(5)	1.6 km	MPC · JPL
265657	2005 TX_{145}	—	October 8, 2005	Kitt Peak	Spacewatch	·	2.3 km	MPC · JPL
265658	2005 TZ_{176}	—	October 1, 2005	Anderson Mesa	LONEOS	EUN	1.6 km	MPC · JPL
265659	2005 TK_{186}	—	October 7, 2005	Kitt Peak	Spacewatch	·	1.4 km	MPC · JPL
265660	2005 TH_{191}	—	October 1, 2005	Anderson Mesa	LONEOS	·	1.9 km	MPC · JPL
265661	2005 UB	—	October 21, 2005	Socorro	LINEAR	APO +1km	1.5 km	MPC · JPL
265662	2005 UG_{9}	—	October 21, 2005	Palomar	NEAT	WIT	1.4 km	MPC · JPL
265663	2005 UZ_{16}	—	October 22, 2005	Kitt Peak	Spacewatch	·	2.2 km	MPC · JPL
265664	2005 UF_{23}	—	October 23, 2005	Kitt Peak	Spacewatch	·	1.5 km	MPC · JPL
265665	2005 UQ_{24}	—	October 23, 2005	Kitt Peak	Spacewatch	·	1.5 km	MPC · JPL
265666	2005 UT_{28}	—	March 23, 2003	Apache Point	SDSS	BRA	1.5 km	MPC · JPL
265667	2005 UZ_{28}	—	October 23, 2005	Catalina	CSS	·	1.8 km	MPC · JPL
265668	2005 UQ_{37}	—	October 24, 2005	Kitt Peak	Spacewatch	·	1.6 km	MPC · JPL
265669	2005 UB_{50}	—	October 23, 2005	Catalina	CSS	·	2.1 km	MPC · JPL
265670	2005 UQ_{51}	—	October 23, 2005	Catalina	CSS	·	2.3 km	MPC · JPL
265671	2005 UD_{53}	—	October 23, 2005	Catalina	CSS	·	2.0 km	MPC · JPL
265672	2005 UL_{53}	—	October 23, 2005	Catalina	CSS	·	2.9 km	MPC · JPL
265673	2005 UQ_{53}	—	October 23, 2005	Catalina	CSS	·	2.6 km	MPC · JPL
265674	2005 UT_{55}	—	October 23, 2005	Catalina	CSS	·	2.1 km	MPC · JPL
265675	2005 UZ_{57}	—	October 24, 2005	Kitt Peak	Spacewatch	·	2.1 km	MPC · JPL
265676	2005 UO_{58}	—	October 24, 2005	Kitt Peak	Spacewatch	·	1.3 km	MPC · JPL
265677	2005 UB_{67}	—	October 22, 2005	Kitt Peak	Spacewatch	·	2.1 km	MPC · JPL
265678	2005 UY_{67}	—	October 22, 2005	Palomar	NEAT	·	1.5 km	MPC · JPL
265679	2005 UJ_{70}	—	October 23, 2005	Catalina	CSS	·	2.9 km	MPC · JPL
265680	2005 UK_{73}	—	October 23, 2005	Palomar	NEAT	·	2.1 km	MPC · JPL
265681	2005 UO_{75}	—	October 24, 2005	Palomar	NEAT	MAR	1.4 km	MPC · JPL
265682	2005 UX_{77}	—	October 25, 2005	Palomar	NEAT	·	1.5 km	MPC · JPL
265683	2005 UG_{79}	—	October 25, 2005	Catalina	CSS	526 · slow	3.7 km	MPC · JPL
265684	2005 UF_{88}	—	October 22, 2005	Kitt Peak	Spacewatch	·	1.2 km	MPC · JPL
265685	2005 UX_{96}	—	October 22, 2005	Kitt Peak	Spacewatch	·	1.5 km	MPC · JPL
265686	2005 UX_{98}	—	October 22, 2005	Kitt Peak	Spacewatch	·	2.2 km	MPC · JPL
265687	2005 UW_{101}	—	October 22, 2005	Kitt Peak	Spacewatch	(5)	1.4 km	MPC · JPL
265688	2005 UR_{107}	—	October 22, 2005	Palomar	NEAT	(5)	1.7 km	MPC · JPL
265689	2005 UX_{115}	—	October 23, 2005	Catalina	CSS	·	1.7 km	MPC · JPL
265690	2005 UO_{116}	—	October 23, 2005	Catalina	CSS	·	1.5 km	MPC · JPL
265691	2005 UT_{123}	—	October 24, 2005	Kitt Peak	Spacewatch	·	1.3 km	MPC · JPL
265692	2005 UN_{126}	—	October 24, 2005	Kitt Peak	Spacewatch	·	1.9 km	MPC · JPL
265693	2005 UQ_{126}	—	October 24, 2005	Kitt Peak	Spacewatch	·	1.5 km	MPC · JPL
265694	2005 UX_{127}	—	October 24, 2005	Kitt Peak	Spacewatch	EUN	1.7 km	MPC · JPL
265695	2005 UJ_{131}	—	October 24, 2005	Palomar	NEAT	·	2.7 km	MPC · JPL
265696	2005 UG_{146}	—	October 26, 2005	Kitt Peak	Spacewatch	·	1.5 km	MPC · JPL
265697	2005 UC_{151}	—	October 26, 2005	Kitt Peak	Spacewatch	KOR	1.5 km	MPC · JPL
265698	2005 UR_{152}	—	October 26, 2005	Kitt Peak	Spacewatch	·	2.3 km	MPC · JPL
265699	2005 UO_{153}	—	October 26, 2005	Kitt Peak	Spacewatch	·	1.4 km	MPC · JPL
265700	2005 UX_{155}	—	October 26, 2005	Palomar	NEAT	·	3.4 km	MPC · JPL

== 265701–265800 ==
back to top

Designation			Discovery			Properties		Ref
Permanent	Provisional	Named after	Date	Site	Discoverer(s)	Category	Diam.	Ref
265701	2005 UF_{162}	—	October 27, 2005	Anderson Mesa	LONEOS	·	2.9 km	MPC · JPL
265702	2005 UD_{172}	—	October 24, 2005	Kitt Peak	Spacewatch	(17392)	1.8 km	MPC · JPL
265703	2005 UZ_{180}	—	October 24, 2005	Kitt Peak	Spacewatch	·	2.5 km	MPC · JPL
265704	2005 UN_{182}	—	October 24, 2005	Kitt Peak	Spacewatch	·	2.2 km	MPC · JPL
265705	2005 UM_{186}	—	October 25, 2005	Mount Lemmon	Mount Lemmon Survey	·	1.6 km	MPC · JPL
265706	2005 UT_{201}	—	October 25, 2005	Kitt Peak	Spacewatch	·	1.6 km	MPC · JPL
265707	2005 UA_{213}	—	October 27, 2005	Mount Lemmon	Mount Lemmon Survey	·	1.7 km	MPC · JPL
265708	2005 UY_{224}	—	October 25, 2005	Kitt Peak	Spacewatch	·	1.2 km	MPC · JPL
265709	2005 UT_{237}	—	October 25, 2005	Kitt Peak	Spacewatch	·	2.0 km	MPC · JPL
265710	2005 UM_{238}	—	October 25, 2005	Kitt Peak	Spacewatch	·	1.5 km	MPC · JPL
265711	2005 UQ_{252}	—	October 26, 2005	Kitt Peak	Spacewatch	(13314)	2.0 km	MPC · JPL
265712	2005 UE_{258}	—	October 25, 2005	Kitt Peak	Spacewatch	·	1.7 km	MPC · JPL
265713	2005 UD_{267}	—	October 27, 2005	Kitt Peak	Spacewatch	·	1.9 km	MPC · JPL
265714	2005 UZ_{278}	—	October 24, 2005	Kitt Peak	Spacewatch	·	1.8 km	MPC · JPL
265715	2005 UC_{295}	—	October 26, 2005	Kitt Peak	Spacewatch	·	1.8 km	MPC · JPL
265716	2005 UH_{296}	—	October 26, 2005	Kitt Peak	Spacewatch	·	1.8 km	MPC · JPL
265717	2005 UY_{308}	—	October 28, 2005	Mount Lemmon	Mount Lemmon Survey	·	1.5 km	MPC · JPL
265718	2005 UN_{352}	—	October 29, 2005	Catalina	CSS	·	2.4 km	MPC · JPL
265719	2005 UY_{357}	—	October 24, 2005	Kitt Peak	Spacewatch	·	1.6 km	MPC · JPL
265720	2005 UH_{366}	—	October 27, 2005	Kitt Peak	Spacewatch	·	2.0 km	MPC · JPL
265721	2005 UR_{381}	—	October 30, 2005	Mount Lemmon	Mount Lemmon Survey	·	2.7 km	MPC · JPL
265722	2005 UX_{383}	—	October 27, 2005	Catalina	CSS	ADE	3.2 km	MPC · JPL
265723	2005 UQ_{393}	—	October 28, 2005	Catalina	CSS	·	1.8 km	MPC · JPL
265724	2005 UQ_{410}	—	October 31, 2005	Mount Lemmon	Mount Lemmon Survey	·	1.7 km	MPC · JPL
265725	2005 UB_{413}	—	October 31, 2005	Mount Lemmon	Mount Lemmon Survey	·	1.9 km	MPC · JPL
265726	2005 UK_{413}	—	October 31, 2005	Catalina	CSS	EOS	2.3 km	MPC · JPL
265727	2005 UD_{414}	—	October 25, 2005	Kitt Peak	Spacewatch	·	2.2 km	MPC · JPL
265728	2005 UY_{420}	—	October 25, 2005	Mount Lemmon	Mount Lemmon Survey	·	2.4 km	MPC · JPL
265729	2005 UZ_{429}	—	October 28, 2005	Kitt Peak	Spacewatch	·	1.7 km	MPC · JPL
265730	2005 UQ_{431}	—	October 28, 2005	Kitt Peak	Spacewatch	·	1.5 km	MPC · JPL
265731	2005 UE_{445}	—	October 31, 2005	Anderson Mesa	LONEOS	·	2.2 km	MPC · JPL
265732	2005 US_{446}	—	October 29, 2005	Catalina	CSS	·	2.3 km	MPC · JPL
265733	2005 UZ_{451}	—	October 28, 2005	Socorro	LINEAR	·	1.9 km	MPC · JPL
265734	2005 UH_{454}	—	October 23, 2005	Catalina	CSS	·	2.1 km	MPC · JPL
265735	2005 UY_{483}	—	October 22, 2005	Palomar	NEAT	·	1.6 km	MPC · JPL
265736	2005 UM_{486}	—	October 23, 2005	Catalina	CSS	EUN	1.3 km	MPC · JPL
265737	2005 UT_{498}	—	October 27, 2005	Catalina	CSS	·	1.8 km	MPC · JPL
265738	2005 UX_{498}	—	October 27, 2005	Socorro	LINEAR	·	2.2 km	MPC · JPL
265739	2005 UM_{501}	—	October 27, 2005	Catalina	CSS	·	2.5 km	MPC · JPL
265740	2005 UV_{508}	—	October 25, 2005	Kitt Peak	Spacewatch	AGN	1.4 km	MPC · JPL
265741	2005 UG_{509}	—	October 27, 2005	Catalina	CSS	·	1.7 km	MPC · JPL
265742	2005 UG_{510}	—	October 24, 2005	Mauna Kea	D. J. Tholen	·	2.3 km	MPC · JPL
265743	2005 VX_{2}	—	November 6, 2005	Pla D'Arguines	D'Arguines, Pla	MAR	1.5 km	MPC · JPL
265744	2005 VL_{4}	—	November 6, 2005	Mayhill	Lowe, A.	·	2.7 km	MPC · JPL
265745	2005 VY_{4}	—	November 3, 2005	Kitt Peak	Spacewatch	·	1.7 km	MPC · JPL
265746	2005 VA_{6}	—	November 11, 2005	Cordell-Lorenz	Cordell-Lorenz	·	2.5 km	MPC · JPL
265747	2005 VJ_{6}	—	November 6, 2005	Kitt Peak	Spacewatch	·	3.2 km	MPC · JPL
265748	2005 VH_{10}	—	November 2, 2005	Mount Lemmon	Mount Lemmon Survey	·	1.7 km	MPC · JPL
265749	2005 VQ_{31}	—	November 4, 2005	Kitt Peak	Spacewatch	·	1.9 km	MPC · JPL
265750	2005 VK_{39}	—	November 4, 2005	Socorro	LINEAR	·	2.2 km	MPC · JPL
265751	2005 VR_{44}	—	November 3, 2005	Socorro	LINEAR	·	2.7 km	MPC · JPL
265752	2005 VV_{47}	—	November 5, 2005	Kitt Peak	Spacewatch	·	2.5 km	MPC · JPL
265753	2005 VJ_{50}	—	November 2, 2005	Mount Lemmon	Mount Lemmon Survey	·	2.1 km	MPC · JPL
265754	2005 VC_{76}	—	November 3, 2005	Socorro	LINEAR	·	2.1 km	MPC · JPL
265755	2005 VF_{77}	—	November 5, 2005	Mount Lemmon	Mount Lemmon Survey	·	2.0 km	MPC · JPL
265756	2005 VB_{90}	—	November 6, 2005	Kitt Peak	Spacewatch	·	2.6 km	MPC · JPL
265757	2005 VM_{96}	—	November 7, 2005	Socorro	LINEAR	·	2.1 km	MPC · JPL
265758	2005 VP_{97}	—	November 5, 2005	Kitt Peak	Spacewatch	NEM	3.4 km	MPC · JPL
265759	2005 VH_{103}	—	November 2, 2005	Mount Lemmon	Mount Lemmon Survey	·	3.9 km	MPC · JPL
265760	2005 VW_{111}	—	November 6, 2005	Mount Lemmon	Mount Lemmon Survey	·	1.6 km	MPC · JPL
265761	2005 VO_{125}	—	November 3, 2005	Mount Lemmon	Mount Lemmon Survey	·	2.3 km	MPC · JPL
265762	2005 WG_{5}	—	November 20, 2005	Palomar	NEAT	·	2.6 km	MPC · JPL
265763	2005 WZ_{5}	—	November 21, 2005	Junk Bond	D. Healy	·	1.8 km	MPC · JPL
265764	2005 WR_{7}	—	November 21, 2005	Palomar	NEAT	·	2.0 km	MPC · JPL
265765	2005 WM_{9}	—	November 21, 2005	Kitt Peak	Spacewatch	·	1.6 km	MPC · JPL
265766	2005 WS_{20}	—	November 21, 2005	Kitt Peak	Spacewatch	·	1.4 km	MPC · JPL
265767	2005 WX_{20}	—	November 21, 2005	Kitt Peak	Spacewatch	·	2.8 km	MPC · JPL
265768	2005 WS_{31}	—	November 21, 2005	Kitt Peak	Spacewatch	(12739)	2.1 km	MPC · JPL
265769	2005 WY_{32}	—	November 21, 2005	Kitt Peak	Spacewatch	·	2.4 km	MPC · JPL
265770	2005 WX_{33}	—	November 21, 2005	Kitt Peak	Spacewatch	·	2.3 km	MPC · JPL
265771	2005 WS_{35}	—	November 22, 2005	Kitt Peak	Spacewatch	NEM	3.2 km	MPC · JPL
265772	2005 WD_{36}	—	November 22, 2005	Kitt Peak	Spacewatch	·	3.3 km	MPC · JPL
265773	2005 WK_{49}	—	November 25, 2005	Kitt Peak	Spacewatch	·	2.1 km	MPC · JPL
265774	2005 WY_{62}	—	November 25, 2005	Catalina	CSS	·	2.7 km	MPC · JPL
265775	2005 WF_{64}	—	November 25, 2005	Catalina	CSS	·	2.0 km	MPC · JPL
265776	2005 WR_{66}	—	November 22, 2005	Kitt Peak	Spacewatch	·	2.7 km	MPC · JPL
265777	2005 WM_{74}	—	November 27, 2005	Anderson Mesa	LONEOS	MAR	2.1 km	MPC · JPL
265778	2005 WZ_{95}	—	November 26, 2005	Kitt Peak	Spacewatch	AST	2.2 km	MPC · JPL
265779	2005 WM_{97}	—	November 26, 2005	Mount Lemmon	Mount Lemmon Survey	·	2.0 km	MPC · JPL
265780	2005 WT_{100}	—	November 29, 2005	Socorro	LINEAR	·	1.7 km	MPC · JPL
265781	2005 WZ_{100}	—	November 29, 2005	Socorro	LINEAR	·	2.6 km	MPC · JPL
265782	2005 WT_{109}	—	November 30, 2005	Kitt Peak	Spacewatch	·	2.2 km	MPC · JPL
265783	2005 WW_{116}	—	November 30, 2005	Mount Lemmon	Mount Lemmon Survey	·	2.8 km	MPC · JPL
265784	2005 WM_{120}	—	November 29, 2005	Socorro	LINEAR	(18466)	3.3 km	MPC · JPL
265785	2005 WV_{120}	—	November 30, 2005	Kitt Peak	Spacewatch	·	3.1 km	MPC · JPL
265786	2005 WG_{121}	—	November 30, 2005	Mount Lemmon	Mount Lemmon Survey	·	2.0 km	MPC · JPL
265787	2005 WA_{126}	—	November 25, 2005	Mount Lemmon	Mount Lemmon Survey	·	1.5 km	MPC · JPL
265788	2005 WH_{144}	—	November 30, 2005	Palomar	NEAT	·	3.2 km	MPC · JPL
265789	2005 WM_{150}	—	November 28, 2005	Socorro	LINEAR	·	2.5 km	MPC · JPL
265790	2005 WD_{155}	—	November 29, 2005	Kitt Peak	Spacewatch	AGN	1.4 km	MPC · JPL
265791	2005 WT_{156}	—	November 30, 2005	Socorro	LINEAR	(5)	1.5 km	MPC · JPL
265792	2005 WS_{159}	—	November 30, 2005	Kitt Peak	Spacewatch	·	1.9 km	MPC · JPL
265793	2005 WK_{169}	—	November 30, 2005	Mount Lemmon	Mount Lemmon Survey	NYS	1.7 km	MPC · JPL
265794	2005 WK_{180}	—	November 21, 2005	Catalina	CSS	·	2.5 km	MPC · JPL
265795	2005 WE_{193}	—	November 26, 2005	Catalina	CSS	slow	2.4 km	MPC · JPL
265796	2005 WQ_{193}	—	November 28, 2005	Palomar	NEAT	MAR	1.6 km	MPC · JPL
265797	2005 WP_{194}	—	November 29, 2005	Catalina	CSS	·	1.9 km	MPC · JPL
265798	2005 WJ_{196}	—	November 30, 2005	Kitt Peak	Spacewatch	·	2.7 km	MPC · JPL
265799	2005 WY_{196}	—	November 30, 2005	Socorro	LINEAR	·	3.7 km	MPC · JPL
265800	2005 WX_{207}	—	November 28, 2005	Kitt Peak	Spacewatch	·	2.3 km	MPC · JPL

== 265801–265900 ==
back to top

Designation			Discovery			Properties		Ref
Permanent	Provisional	Named after	Date	Site	Discoverer(s)	Category	Diam.	Ref
265801	2005 XZ_{2}	—	December 1, 2005	Palomar	NEAT	·	2.9 km	MPC · JPL
265802	2005 XR_{4}	—	December 2, 2005	Mount Lemmon	Mount Lemmon Survey	·	2.7 km	MPC · JPL
265803	2005 XE_{5}	—	December 6, 2005	Desert Moon	Stevens, B. L.	·	1.9 km	MPC · JPL
265804	2005 XG_{6}	—	December 2, 2005	Kitt Peak	Spacewatch	·	1.5 km	MPC · JPL
265805	2005 XC_{18}	—	December 1, 2005	Kitt Peak	Spacewatch	·	2.8 km	MPC · JPL
265806	2005 XW_{24}	—	December 2, 2005	Mount Lemmon	Mount Lemmon Survey	·	2.5 km	MPC · JPL
265807	2005 XS_{26}	—	December 4, 2005	Kitt Peak	Spacewatch	·	4.1 km	MPC · JPL
265808	2005 XL_{32}	—	December 4, 2005	Kitt Peak	Spacewatch	·	2.2 km	MPC · JPL
265809	2005 XN_{35}	—	December 4, 2005	Kitt Peak	Spacewatch	·	3.2 km	MPC · JPL
265810	2005 XJ_{38}	—	December 4, 2005	Kitt Peak	Spacewatch	·	5.5 km	MPC · JPL
265811	2005 XM_{38}	—	December 4, 2005	Kitt Peak	Spacewatch	EOS	2.9 km	MPC · JPL
265812	2005 XA_{40}	—	December 5, 2005	Mount Lemmon	Mount Lemmon Survey	·	1.8 km	MPC · JPL
265813	2005 XN_{44}	—	December 2, 2005	Kitt Peak	Spacewatch	(13314)	2.0 km	MPC · JPL
265814	2005 XZ_{58}	—	December 3, 2005	Kitt Peak	Spacewatch	·	2.2 km	MPC · JPL
265815	2005 XL_{60}	—	December 3, 2005	Kitt Peak	Spacewatch	·	2.4 km	MPC · JPL
265816	2005 XV_{64}	—	December 7, 2005	Socorro	LINEAR	·	2.6 km	MPC · JPL
265817	2005 XA_{67}	—	December 5, 2005	Kitt Peak	Spacewatch	·	3.2 km	MPC · JPL
265818	2005 XU_{67}	—	December 5, 2005	Mount Lemmon	Mount Lemmon Survey	·	3.3 km	MPC · JPL
265819	2005 XK_{68}	—	December 6, 2005	Kitt Peak	Spacewatch	·	1.6 km	MPC · JPL
265820	2005 XA_{70}	—	December 6, 2005	Kitt Peak	Spacewatch	·	2.3 km	MPC · JPL
265821	2005 XZ_{110}	—	December 1, 2005	Kitt Peak	M. W. Buie	·	4.0 km	MPC · JPL
265822	2005 YS_{1}	—	December 18, 2005	Marly	P. Kocher	·	2.0 km	MPC · JPL
265823	2005 YD_{3}	—	December 21, 2005	Catalina	CSS	·	3.4 km	MPC · JPL
265824	2005 YD_{6}	—	December 21, 2005	Kitt Peak	Spacewatch	·	2.1 km	MPC · JPL
265825	2005 YX_{6}	—	December 21, 2005	Catalina	CSS	WIT	1.5 km	MPC · JPL
265826	2005 YL_{9}	—	December 21, 2005	Kitt Peak	Spacewatch	·	1.5 km	MPC · JPL
265827	2005 YP_{11}	—	December 21, 2005	Kitt Peak	Spacewatch	KOR	1.8 km	MPC · JPL
265828	2005 YT_{20}	—	December 24, 2005	Kitt Peak	Spacewatch	KOR	1.8 km	MPC · JPL
265829	2005 YF_{23}	—	December 24, 2005	Kitt Peak	Spacewatch	KOR	1.7 km	MPC · JPL
265830	2005 YD_{24}	—	December 24, 2005	Kitt Peak	Spacewatch	KOR	1.6 km	MPC · JPL
265831	2005 YK_{33}	—	December 24, 2005	Kitt Peak	Spacewatch	KOR	1.9 km	MPC · JPL
265832	2005 YY_{34}	—	December 24, 2005	Kitt Peak	Spacewatch	·	2.6 km	MPC · JPL
265833	2005 YA_{35}	—	December 24, 2005	Kitt Peak	Spacewatch	·	2.9 km	MPC · JPL
265834	2005 YK_{40}	—	December 22, 2005	Kitt Peak	Spacewatch	·	3.2 km	MPC · JPL
265835	2005 YW_{44}	—	December 25, 2005	Kitt Peak	Spacewatch	·	2.9 km	MPC · JPL
265836	2005 YJ_{46}	—	December 25, 2005	Kitt Peak	Spacewatch	KOR	1.8 km	MPC · JPL
265837	2005 YD_{53}	—	December 22, 2005	Kitt Peak	Spacewatch	·	2.9 km	MPC · JPL
265838	2005 YX_{55}	—	December 21, 2005	Kitt Peak	Spacewatch	AGN	1.3 km	MPC · JPL
265839	2005 YE_{63}	—	December 24, 2005	Kitt Peak	Spacewatch	·	2.9 km	MPC · JPL
265840	2005 YK_{63}	—	December 24, 2005	Kitt Peak	Spacewatch	·	2.6 km	MPC · JPL
265841	2005 YX_{64}	—	December 25, 2005	Kitt Peak	Spacewatch	·	2.7 km	MPC · JPL
265842	2005 YC_{65}	—	December 25, 2005	Kitt Peak	Spacewatch	·	2.6 km	MPC · JPL
265843	2005 YG_{71}	—	December 24, 2005	Kitt Peak	Spacewatch	·	2.3 km	MPC · JPL
265844	2005 YF_{73}	—	December 24, 2005	Kitt Peak	Spacewatch	EOS	2.5 km	MPC · JPL
265845	2005 YJ_{76}	—	December 24, 2005	Kitt Peak	Spacewatch	KOR	1.8 km	MPC · JPL
265846	2005 YF_{80}	—	December 24, 2005	Kitt Peak	Spacewatch	·	2.9 km	MPC · JPL
265847	2005 YD_{81}	—	December 24, 2005	Kitt Peak	Spacewatch	KOR	1.7 km	MPC · JPL
265848	2005 YX_{81}	—	December 24, 2005	Kitt Peak	Spacewatch	KOR	1.7 km	MPC · JPL
265849	2005 YA_{91}	—	December 26, 2005	Mount Lemmon	Mount Lemmon Survey	·	2.2 km	MPC · JPL
265850	2005 YQ_{92}	—	December 27, 2005	Mount Lemmon	Mount Lemmon Survey	ANF	1.5 km	MPC · JPL
265851	2005 YE_{95}	—	December 25, 2005	Kitt Peak	Spacewatch	·	3.2 km	MPC · JPL
265852	2005 YY_{110}	—	December 25, 2005	Kitt Peak	Spacewatch	·	5.0 km	MPC · JPL
265853	2005 YC_{120}	—	December 27, 2005	Mount Lemmon	Mount Lemmon Survey	HOF	3.3 km	MPC · JPL
265854	2005 YX_{131}	—	December 25, 2005	Mount Lemmon	Mount Lemmon Survey	·	2.6 km	MPC · JPL
265855	2005 YQ_{142}	—	December 28, 2005	Mount Lemmon	Mount Lemmon Survey	KOR	1.4 km	MPC · JPL
265856	2005 YM_{148}	—	December 25, 2005	Kitt Peak	Spacewatch	WIT	1.3 km	MPC · JPL
265857	2005 YR_{151}	—	December 25, 2005	Kitt Peak	Spacewatch	·	2.6 km	MPC · JPL
265858	2005 YC_{157}	—	December 27, 2005	Kitt Peak	Spacewatch	·	2.0 km	MPC · JPL
265859	2005 YZ_{159}	—	December 27, 2005	Kitt Peak	Spacewatch	·	3.3 km	MPC · JPL
265860	2005 YJ_{161}	—	December 27, 2005	Kitt Peak	Spacewatch	AGN	1.6 km	MPC · JPL
265861	2005 YP_{161}	—	December 27, 2005	Socorro	LINEAR	·	3.6 km	MPC · JPL
265862	2005 YG_{162}	—	December 27, 2005	Mount Lemmon	Mount Lemmon Survey	KOR	1.5 km	MPC · JPL
265863	2005 YH_{162}	—	December 27, 2005	Mount Lemmon	Mount Lemmon Survey	·	5.2 km	MPC · JPL
265864	2005 YB_{164}	—	December 29, 2005	Kitt Peak	Spacewatch	·	3.5 km	MPC · JPL
265865	2005 YD_{164}	—	December 29, 2005	Kitt Peak	Spacewatch	·	2.8 km	MPC · JPL
265866	2005 YT_{170}	—	December 29, 2005	Palomar	NEAT	·	2.4 km	MPC · JPL
265867	2005 YD_{179}	—	December 26, 2005	Mount Lemmon	Mount Lemmon Survey	KOR	1.8 km	MPC · JPL
265868	2005 YQ_{186}	—	December 29, 2005	Catalina	CSS	H	920 m	MPC · JPL
265869	2005 YQ_{198}	—	December 25, 2005	Kitt Peak	Spacewatch	·	2.2 km	MPC · JPL
265870	2005 YD_{203}	—	December 25, 2005	Kitt Peak	Spacewatch	(13314)	3.3 km	MPC · JPL
265871	2005 YC_{223}	—	December 24, 2005	Kitt Peak	Spacewatch	·	2.0 km	MPC · JPL
265872	2005 YD_{224}	—	December 24, 2005	Kitt Peak	Spacewatch	KOR	1.4 km	MPC · JPL
265873	2005 YL_{229}	—	December 25, 2005	Kitt Peak	Spacewatch	·	5.2 km	MPC · JPL
265874	2005 YK_{235}	—	December 28, 2005	Mount Lemmon	Mount Lemmon Survey	·	2.6 km	MPC · JPL
265875	2005 YQ_{258}	—	December 24, 2005	Kitt Peak	Spacewatch	·	1.9 km	MPC · JPL
265876	2005 YB_{282}	—	December 26, 2005	Mount Lemmon	Mount Lemmon Survey	·	3.0 km	MPC · JPL
265877	2005 YJ_{282}	—	December 26, 2005	Mount Lemmon	Mount Lemmon Survey	·	2.0 km	MPC · JPL
265878	2005 YM_{282}	—	December 26, 2005	Mount Lemmon	Mount Lemmon Survey	KOR	1.8 km	MPC · JPL
265879	2006 AQ_{7}	—	January 5, 2006	Catalina	CSS	H	890 m	MPC · JPL
265880	2006 AT_{7}	—	January 5, 2006	Catalina	CSS	GAL	1.8 km	MPC · JPL
265881	2006 AA_{8}	—	January 7, 2006	Anderson Mesa	LONEOS	·	3.7 km	MPC · JPL
265882	2006 AF_{8}	—	January 7, 2006	Anderson Mesa	LONEOS	H	810 m	MPC · JPL
265883	2006 AB_{12}	—	January 4, 2006	Kitt Peak	Spacewatch	·	2.3 km	MPC · JPL
265884	2006 AM_{23}	—	January 4, 2006	Kitt Peak	Spacewatch	·	2.0 km	MPC · JPL
265885	2006 AQ_{26}	—	January 5, 2006	Kitt Peak	Spacewatch	AGN	2.0 km	MPC · JPL
265886	2006 AE_{29}	—	January 6, 2006	Anderson Mesa	LONEOS	·	3.5 km	MPC · JPL
265887	2006 AK_{29}	—	January 2, 2006	Catalina	CSS	·	3.0 km	MPC · JPL
265888	2006 AL_{31}	—	January 5, 2006	Kitt Peak	Spacewatch	·	2.2 km	MPC · JPL
265889	2006 AK_{57}	—	January 8, 2006	Mount Lemmon	Mount Lemmon Survey	·	3.3 km	MPC · JPL
265890	2006 AA_{62}	—	January 5, 2006	Kitt Peak	Spacewatch	NAE	4.2 km	MPC · JPL
265891	2006 AX_{62}	—	January 6, 2006	Kitt Peak	Spacewatch	·	2.3 km	MPC · JPL
265892	2006 AE_{63}	—	January 6, 2006	Kitt Peak	Spacewatch	GEF	1.8 km	MPC · JPL
265893	2006 AM_{65}	—	January 8, 2006	Kitt Peak	Spacewatch	KOR	1.7 km	MPC · JPL
265894	2006 AA_{75}	—	January 2, 2006	Mount Lemmon	Mount Lemmon Survey	AGN	1.6 km	MPC · JPL
265895	2006 AB_{78}	—	January 8, 2006	Mount Lemmon	Mount Lemmon Survey	·	3.3 km	MPC · JPL
265896	2006 AO_{92}	—	January 7, 2006	Mount Lemmon	Mount Lemmon Survey	·	2.9 km	MPC · JPL
265897	2006 BG_{29}	—	January 23, 2006	Mount Nyukasa	Japan Aerospace Exploration Agency	·	2.2 km	MPC · JPL
265898	2006 BP_{29}	—	January 23, 2006	Mount Nyukasa	Japan Aerospace Exploration Agency	·	2.5 km	MPC · JPL
265899	2006 BD_{34}	—	January 21, 2006	Kitt Peak	Spacewatch	·	2.7 km	MPC · JPL
265900	2006 BY_{34}	—	January 22, 2006	Mount Lemmon	Mount Lemmon Survey	·	1.8 km	MPC · JPL

== 265901–266000 ==
back to top

Designation			Discovery			Properties		Ref
Permanent	Provisional	Named after	Date	Site	Discoverer(s)	Category	Diam.	Ref
265901	2006 BW_{43}	—	January 23, 2006	Kitt Peak	Spacewatch	·	2.7 km	MPC · JPL
265902	2006 BX_{44}	—	January 23, 2006	Mount Lemmon	Mount Lemmon Survey	·	4.0 km	MPC · JPL
265903	2006 BZ_{58}	—	January 23, 2006	Kitt Peak	Spacewatch	TEL	2.2 km	MPC · JPL
265904	2006 BN_{67}	—	January 23, 2006	Kitt Peak	Spacewatch	KOR	1.7 km	MPC · JPL
265905	2006 BU_{68}	—	January 23, 2006	Kitt Peak	Spacewatch	KOR	1.6 km	MPC · JPL
265906	2006 BD_{72}	—	August 23, 2003	Palomar	NEAT	·	3.4 km	MPC · JPL
265907	2006 BO_{74}	—	January 23, 2006	Kitt Peak	Spacewatch	·	2.8 km	MPC · JPL
265908	2006 BM_{75}	—	January 23, 2006	Kitt Peak	Spacewatch	·	4.8 km	MPC · JPL
265909	2006 BP_{79}	—	January 23, 2006	Kitt Peak	Spacewatch	EOS	2.9 km	MPC · JPL
265910	2006 BF_{82}	—	January 23, 2006	Kitt Peak	Spacewatch	EOS	2.5 km	MPC · JPL
265911	2006 BM_{82}	—	January 23, 2006	Mount Lemmon	Mount Lemmon Survey	·	2.6 km	MPC · JPL
265912	2006 BB_{87}	—	January 25, 2006	Kitt Peak	Spacewatch	·	2.8 km	MPC · JPL
265913	2006 BC_{87}	—	January 25, 2006	Kitt Peak	Spacewatch	·	2.0 km	MPC · JPL
265914	2006 BO_{87}	—	January 25, 2006	Kitt Peak	Spacewatch	·	2.8 km	MPC · JPL
265915	2006 BJ_{91}	—	January 26, 2006	Kitt Peak	Spacewatch	THM	2.3 km	MPC · JPL
265916	2006 BP_{91}	—	January 26, 2006	Kitt Peak	Spacewatch	·	2.8 km	MPC · JPL
265917	2006 BQ_{94}	—	January 26, 2006	Kitt Peak	Spacewatch	KOR	1.7 km	MPC · JPL
265918	2006 BA_{110}	—	January 25, 2006	Kitt Peak	Spacewatch	EMA	5.7 km	MPC · JPL
265919	2006 BK_{113}	—	January 25, 2006	Kitt Peak	Spacewatch	KOR	1.7 km	MPC · JPL
265920	2006 BA_{115}	—	January 26, 2006	Kitt Peak	Spacewatch	·	3.5 km	MPC · JPL
265921	2006 BC_{128}	—	January 26, 2006	Kitt Peak	Spacewatch	·	2.4 km	MPC · JPL
265922	2006 BS_{130}	—	January 26, 2006	Kitt Peak	Spacewatch	HYG	3.4 km	MPC · JPL
265923	2006 BZ_{134}	—	January 27, 2006	Mount Lemmon	Mount Lemmon Survey	KOR	1.6 km	MPC · JPL
265924 Franceclemente	2006 BL_{147}	Franceclemente	January 21, 2006	Vallemare Borbona	V. S. Casulli	KOR	1.7 km	MPC · JPL
265925	2006 BB_{152}	—	January 25, 2006	Kitt Peak	Spacewatch	KOR	1.7 km	MPC · JPL
265926	2006 BP_{152}	—	January 25, 2006	Kitt Peak	Spacewatch	·	2.8 km	MPC · JPL
265927	2006 BG_{157}	—	January 25, 2006	Kitt Peak	Spacewatch	·	3.0 km	MPC · JPL
265928	2006 BQ_{157}	—	January 25, 2006	Kitt Peak	Spacewatch	·	5.1 km	MPC · JPL
265929	2006 BG_{158}	—	January 25, 2006	Kitt Peak	Spacewatch	·	3.0 km	MPC · JPL
265930	2006 BK_{158}	—	January 25, 2006	Kitt Peak	Spacewatch	THM	2.9 km	MPC · JPL
265931	2006 BN_{158}	—	January 25, 2006	Kitt Peak	Spacewatch	·	2.0 km	MPC · JPL
265932	2006 BL_{159}	—	January 26, 2006	Kitt Peak	Spacewatch	·	3.6 km	MPC · JPL
265933	2006 BT_{160}	—	January 26, 2006	Kitt Peak	Spacewatch	NYS	910 m	MPC · JPL
265934	2006 BN_{162}	—	January 26, 2006	Mount Lemmon	Mount Lemmon Survey	EOS	2.2 km	MPC · JPL
265935	2006 BB_{166}	—	January 26, 2006	Mount Lemmon	Mount Lemmon Survey	THM	3.5 km	MPC · JPL
265936	2006 BF_{181}	—	January 27, 2006	Mount Lemmon	Mount Lemmon Survey	·	2.8 km	MPC · JPL
265937	2006 BG_{181}	—	January 27, 2006	Mount Lemmon	Mount Lemmon Survey	·	3.8 km	MPC · JPL
265938	2006 BP_{183}	—	January 27, 2006	Kitt Peak	Spacewatch	·	2.3 km	MPC · JPL
265939	2006 BD_{188}	—	January 28, 2006	Kitt Peak	Spacewatch	·	4.3 km	MPC · JPL
265940	2006 BF_{188}	—	January 28, 2006	Kitt Peak	Spacewatch	·	5.5 km	MPC · JPL
265941	2006 BQ_{195}	—	January 30, 2006	Kitt Peak	Spacewatch	·	3.8 km	MPC · JPL
265942	2006 BW_{205}	—	January 31, 2006	Kitt Peak	Spacewatch	·	2.6 km	MPC · JPL
265943	2006 BV_{207}	—	January 31, 2006	Catalina	CSS	·	2.3 km	MPC · JPL
265944	2006 BL_{208}	—	January 31, 2006	Catalina	CSS	·	2.7 km	MPC · JPL
265945	2006 BR_{211}	—	January 31, 2006	Kitt Peak	Spacewatch	·	2.8 km	MPC · JPL
265946	2006 BX_{212}	—	January 30, 2006	Bergisch Gladbach	W. Bickel	·	2.7 km	MPC · JPL
265947	2006 BL_{221}	—	January 30, 2006	Kitt Peak	Spacewatch	EOS	2.0 km	MPC · JPL
265948	2006 BX_{222}	—	January 30, 2006	Kitt Peak	Spacewatch	·	1.8 km	MPC · JPL
265949	2006 BZ_{231}	—	January 31, 2006	Kitt Peak	Spacewatch	AGN	1.7 km	MPC · JPL
265950	2006 BF_{232}	—	January 31, 2006	Kitt Peak	Spacewatch	·	2.1 km	MPC · JPL
265951	2006 BU_{244}	—	January 31, 2006	Kitt Peak	Spacewatch	·	1.7 km	MPC · JPL
265952	2006 BW_{248}	—	January 31, 2006	Kitt Peak	Spacewatch	·	2.2 km	MPC · JPL
265953	2006 BO_{251}	—	January 31, 2006	Kitt Peak	Spacewatch	·	1.9 km	MPC · JPL
265954	2006 BL_{254}	—	January 31, 2006	Kitt Peak	Spacewatch	·	3.3 km	MPC · JPL
265955	2006 BG_{257}	—	January 31, 2006	Kitt Peak	Spacewatch	·	2.2 km	MPC · JPL
265956	2006 BZ_{258}	—	January 31, 2006	Kitt Peak	Spacewatch	·	3.0 km	MPC · JPL
265957	2006 BL_{263}	—	January 31, 2006	Kitt Peak	Spacewatch	·	4.5 km	MPC · JPL
265958	2006 BX_{266}	—	January 25, 2006	Anderson Mesa	LONEOS	·	2.6 km	MPC · JPL
265959	2006 BV_{270}	—	January 31, 2006	Catalina	CSS	·	3.3 km	MPC · JPL
265960	2006 BF_{274}	—	January 23, 2006	Kitt Peak	Spacewatch	·	2.6 km	MPC · JPL
265961	2006 BD_{280}	—	January 23, 2006	Kitt Peak	Spacewatch	THM	3.2 km	MPC · JPL
265962	2006 CG	—	February 1, 2006	Mount Lemmon	Mount Lemmon Survey	AMO	560 m	MPC · JPL
265963	2006 CU_{52}	—	February 4, 2006	Kitt Peak	Spacewatch	·	2.2 km	MPC · JPL
265964	2006 CO_{59}	—	February 6, 2006	Mount Lemmon	Mount Lemmon Survey	THM	2.5 km	MPC · JPL
265965	2006 CH_{61}	—	February 2, 2006	Anderson Mesa	LONEOS	(21885)	4.9 km	MPC · JPL
265966	2006 CN_{65}	—	February 5, 2006	Mount Lemmon	Mount Lemmon Survey	KOR	1.7 km	MPC · JPL
265967	2006 CQ_{65}	—	February 4, 2006	Kitt Peak	Spacewatch	HYG	3.6 km	MPC · JPL
265968	2006 DO_{1}	—	February 20, 2006	Kitt Peak	Spacewatch	·	2.8 km	MPC · JPL
265969	2006 DD_{11}	—	February 21, 2006	Catalina	CSS	·	3.1 km	MPC · JPL
265970	2006 DJ_{12}	—	February 20, 2006	Mount Lemmon	Mount Lemmon Survey	THM	2.9 km	MPC · JPL
265971	2006 DY_{15}	—	February 20, 2006	Kitt Peak	Spacewatch	·	3.7 km	MPC · JPL
265972	2006 DE_{16}	—	February 20, 2006	Kitt Peak	Spacewatch	·	3.5 km	MPC · JPL
265973	2006 DS_{17}	—	February 20, 2006	Kitt Peak	Spacewatch	·	3.3 km	MPC · JPL
265974	2006 DN_{23}	—	February 20, 2006	Kitt Peak	Spacewatch	·	2.8 km	MPC · JPL
265975	2006 DB_{24}	—	February 20, 2006	Kitt Peak	Spacewatch	·	3.2 km	MPC · JPL
265976	2006 DZ_{26}	—	February 20, 2006	Kitt Peak	Spacewatch	·	3.4 km	MPC · JPL
265977	2006 DV_{30}	—	February 20, 2006	Kitt Peak	Spacewatch	THM	2.6 km	MPC · JPL
265978	2006 DH_{31}	—	February 20, 2006	Mount Lemmon	Mount Lemmon Survey	·	3.7 km	MPC · JPL
265979	2006 DM_{31}	—	February 20, 2006	Mount Lemmon	Mount Lemmon Survey	VER	3.1 km	MPC · JPL
265980	2006 DN_{32}	—	February 20, 2006	Mount Lemmon	Mount Lemmon Survey	·	3.2 km	MPC · JPL
265981	2006 DV_{35}	—	February 20, 2006	Kitt Peak	Spacewatch	·	4.0 km	MPC · JPL
265982	2006 DH_{36}	—	February 20, 2006	Mount Lemmon	Mount Lemmon Survey	·	3.5 km	MPC · JPL
265983	2006 DW_{49}	—	February 22, 2006	Anderson Mesa	LONEOS	·	4.1 km	MPC · JPL
265984	2006 DS_{55}	—	February 24, 2006	Mount Lemmon	Mount Lemmon Survey	·	2.9 km	MPC · JPL
265985	2006 DL_{66}	—	February 22, 2006	Catalina	CSS	·	2.9 km	MPC · JPL
265986	2006 DP_{70}	—	February 21, 2006	Mount Lemmon	Mount Lemmon Survey	·	2.6 km	MPC · JPL
265987	2006 DV_{77}	—	February 24, 2006	Kitt Peak	Spacewatch	·	3.1 km	MPC · JPL
265988	2006 DF_{82}	—	February 24, 2006	Kitt Peak	Spacewatch	EOS	3.2 km	MPC · JPL
265989	2006 DD_{83}	—	February 24, 2006	Kitt Peak	Spacewatch	·	3.5 km	MPC · JPL
265990	2006 DE_{87}	—	February 24, 2006	Kitt Peak	Spacewatch	·	2.9 km	MPC · JPL
265991	2006 DM_{88}	—	February 24, 2006	Kitt Peak	Spacewatch	THM	2.3 km	MPC · JPL
265992	2006 DY_{89}	—	February 24, 2006	Kitt Peak	Spacewatch	·	4.1 km	MPC · JPL
265993	2006 DS_{97}	—	February 24, 2006	Mount Lemmon	Mount Lemmon Survey	·	4.5 km	MPC · JPL
265994	2006 DN_{100}	—	February 25, 2006	Mount Lemmon	Mount Lemmon Survey	HYG	4.6 km	MPC · JPL
265995	2006 DV_{102}	—	February 25, 2006	Mount Lemmon	Mount Lemmon Survey	·	2.4 km	MPC · JPL
265996	2006 DA_{103}	—	February 25, 2006	Mount Lemmon	Mount Lemmon Survey	·	2.5 km	MPC · JPL
265997	2006 DT_{107}	—	February 25, 2006	Kitt Peak	Spacewatch	·	3.2 km	MPC · JPL
265998	2006 DE_{110}	—	February 25, 2006	Mount Lemmon	Mount Lemmon Survey	LIX	4.6 km	MPC · JPL
265999	2006 DQ_{112}	—	February 27, 2006	Mount Lemmon	Mount Lemmon Survey	·	3.9 km	MPC · JPL
266000	2006 DF_{131}	—	February 25, 2006	Kitt Peak	Spacewatch	·	3.3 km	MPC · JPL

back to top

== See also ==
- Meanings of minor-planet names: 265001–266000
