= Meanings of minor-planet names: 264001–265000 =

As minor planet discoveries are confirmed, they are given a permanent number by the IAU's Minor Planet Center (MPC), and the discoverers can then submit names for them, following the IAU's naming conventions. The list below concerns those minor planets in the specified number-range that have received names, and explains the meanings of those names.

Official naming citations of newly named small Solar System bodies are approved and published in a bulletin by IAU's Working Group for Small Bodies Nomenclature (WGSBN). Before May 2021, citations were published in MPC's Minor Planet Circulars for many decades. Recent citations can also be found on the JPL Small-Body Database (SBDB). Until his death in 2016, German astronomer Lutz D. Schmadel compiled these citations into the Dictionary of Minor Planet Names (DMP) and regularly updated the collection.

Based on Paul Herget's The Names of the Minor Planets, Schmadel also researched the unclear origin of numerous asteroids, most of which had been named prior to World War II. This article incorporates text from this source, which is in the public domain: SBDB New namings may only be added to this list below after official publication as the preannouncement of names is condemned. The WGSBN publishes a comprehensive guideline for the naming rules of non-cometary small Solar System bodies.

== 264001–264100 ==
Named minor planet	Provisional	This minor planet was named for...	Ref · Catalog
264020 Stuttgart	2009 QS_{1}	Stuttgart, the capital city of Baden-Württemberg, Germany.	JPL · 264020
264033 Boris-Mikhail	2009 QS_{33}	Boris I (832–907), also known as Boris-Mikhail, was the ruler of the First Bulgarian Empire in 852–889.	JPL · 264033
264045 Heinerklinkrad	2009 RC_{26}	Heiner Klinkrad (born 1953), a German engineer, academic and former head of the ESA's Space Debris Office (also see Space debris and ESA Space Debris Telescope)	JPL · 264045
264061 Vitebsk	2009 SY_{100}	Vitebsk, the fourth-largest and one of the oldest cities in Belarus.	JPL · 264061
264068 Gudzinevičiūtė	2009 SQ_{148}	Daina Gudzinevičiūtė, Olympic shooting champion from Lithuania, president of the National Olympic Committee, and a member of the International Olympic Committee.	IAU · 264068
264077 Dluzhnevskaya	2009 SH_{215}	Ol'ga Borisovna Dluzhnevskaya (born 1936), a scientist in the Institute of Astronomy of the Russian Academy of Sciences	JPL · 264077

== 264101–264200 ==
back to top

Named minor planet	Provisional	This minor planet was named for...	Ref · Catalog
264119 Georgeorton	2009 TT_{7}	George Washington Orton (1873–1958) was a middle- and long-distance runner. In 1900, he became the first Canadian to win a medal at an Olympic Games.	IAU · 264119
264131 Bornim	2009 UQ_{4}	Bornim, a district of the city of Potsdam in Brandenburg, Germany	JPL · 264131
264150 Dolops	2009 VT_{24}	Dolops the Achaean, son of Clytius and killed by Hektor in the Trojan War	JPL · 264150
264165 Poehler	2010 AP_{120}	Amy Poehler (born 1971), an American actor, writer, and comedian who has been nominated for numerous awards for her work on Saturday Night Live and other television shows	JPL · 264165

== 264201–264300 ==
back to top

Named minor planet	Provisional	This minor planet was named for...	Ref · Catalog
There are no named minor planets in this number range

== 264301–264400 ==
back to top

Named minor planet	Provisional	This minor planet was named for...	Ref · Catalog
There are no named minor planets in this number range

== 264401–264500 ==
back to top

Named minor planet	Provisional	This minor planet was named for...	Ref · Catalog
264474 Rogerclark	2001 FH_{212}	Roger Clark (born 1953) made fundamental discoveries about solid surfaces on bodies from Earth to Saturn. He applied imaging spectroscopy to map minerals on these bodies on numerous NASA missions and applied these methods to assess the 9/11 disaster and determine oil leakage from the Gulf spill.	JPL · 264474
264476 Aepic	2001 HP	"Aepic" acronym of the French association of amateur astronomers "Amateurs Espace Pic", which popularizes astronomy at the Pic du Midi Observatory †	JPL · 264476

== 264501–264600 ==
back to top

Named minor planet	Provisional	This minor planet was named for...	Ref · Catalog
There are no named minor planets in this number range

== 264601–264700 ==
back to top

Named minor planet	Provisional	This minor planet was named for...	Ref · Catalog
There are no named minor planets in this number range

== 264701–264800 ==
back to top

Named minor planet	Provisional	This minor planet was named for...	Ref · Catalog
There are no named minor planets in this number range

== 264801–264900 ==
back to top

Named minor planet	Provisional	This minor planet was named for...	Ref · Catalog
There are no named minor planets in this number range

== 264901–265000 ==
back to top

Named minor planet	Provisional	This minor planet was named for...	Ref · Catalog
There are no named minor planets in this number range

back to top

Preceded by 263,001–264,000	Meanings of minor-planet names List of minor planets: 264,001–265,000	Succeeded by 265,001–266,000
