= List of minor planets: 264001–265000 =

The following is a partial list of minor planets, running from minor-planet number 264001 through 265000, inclusive. The primary data for this and other partial lists is based on JPL's "Small-Body Orbital Elements" and data available from the Minor Planet Center. Critical list information is also provided by the MPC, unless otherwise specified from Lowell Observatory. A detailed description of the table's columns and additional sources are given on the main page including a complete list of every page in this series, and a statistical break-up on the dynamical classification of minor planets.

Also see the summary list of all named bodies in numerical and alphabetical order, and the corresponding naming citations for the number range of this particular list. New namings may only be added to this list after official publication, as the preannouncement of names is condemned by the Working Group for Small Bodies Nomenclature of the International Astronomical Union.

Near-Earth obj.	MBA (inner)	MBA (outer)	Centaur
Mars-crosser	MBA (middle)	Jupiter trojan	Trans-Neptunian obj.
Unclassified

== 264001–264100 ==
Designation			Discovery			Properties		Ref
Permanent	Provisional	Named after	Date	Site	Discoverer(s)	Category	Diam.	Ref
264001	2009 OV_{6}	—	July 21, 2009	Hibiscus	Teamo, N.	HYG	3.7 km	MPC · JPL
264002	2009 OU_{8}	—	July 27, 2009	La Sagra	OAM	·	1.1 km	MPC · JPL
264003	2009 OC_{9}	—	July 28, 2009	La Sagra	OAM	·	4.4 km	MPC · JPL
264004	2009 OO_{10}	—	July 26, 2009	Siding Spring	SSS	·	4.3 km	MPC · JPL
264005	2009 OA_{11}	—	July 28, 2009	Catalina	CSS	·	2.9 km	MPC · JPL
264006	2009 OC_{15}	—	July 28, 2009	Sierra Stars	R. Matson	HYG	3.3 km	MPC · JPL
264007	2009 OY_{17}	—	July 28, 2009	Kitt Peak	Spacewatch	·	1.7 km	MPC · JPL
264008	2009 OM_{19}	—	July 28, 2009	Kitt Peak	Spacewatch	3:2	6.1 km	MPC · JPL
264009	2009 OM_{24}	—	July 19, 2009	Siding Spring	SSS	URS	5.6 km	MPC · JPL
264010	2009 PB_{2}	—	August 15, 2009	Mayhill	Lowe, A.	MAR	1.7 km	MPC · JPL
264011	2009 PP_{2}	—	August 13, 2009	La Sagra	OAM	·	1.9 km	MPC · JPL
264012	2009 PJ_{5}	—	August 15, 2009	La Sagra	OAM	·	1.7 km	MPC · JPL
264013	2009 PX_{5}	—	August 10, 2009	Kitt Peak	Spacewatch	EOS	2.6 km	MPC · JPL
264014	2009 PY_{6}	—	August 15, 2009	Kitt Peak	Spacewatch	·	2.1 km	MPC · JPL
264015	2009 PS_{7}	—	August 15, 2009	Kitt Peak	Spacewatch	·	4.9 km	MPC · JPL
264016	2009 PU_{9}	—	August 14, 2009	La Sagra	OAM	·	1.5 km	MPC · JPL
264017	2009 PF_{14}	—	August 15, 2009	Kitt Peak	Spacewatch	·	3.0 km	MPC · JPL
264018	2009 PL_{18}	—	August 15, 2009	Kitt Peak	Spacewatch	·	2.9 km	MPC · JPL
264019	2009 PR_{19}	—	August 2, 2009	Kitt Peak	Spacewatch	·	5.6 km	MPC · JPL
264020 Stuttgart	2009 QS_{1}	Stuttgart	August 17, 2009	Tzec Maun	E. Schwab	·	2.0 km	MPC · JPL
264021	2009 QB_{2}	—	August 17, 2009	Vicques	M. Ory	CYB	4.9 km	MPC · JPL
264022	2009 QD_{2}	—	August 16, 2009	Črni Vrh	Mikuž, H.	·	5.4 km	MPC · JPL
264023	2009 QA_{8}	—	August 19, 2009	Bergisch Gladbach	W. Bickel	·	4.0 km	MPC · JPL
264024	2009 QB_{8}	—	October 8, 2004	Kitt Peak	Spacewatch	VER	3.9 km	MPC · JPL
264025	2009 QF_{9}	—	August 21, 2009	Skylive	Tozzi, F.	·	1.1 km	MPC · JPL
264026	2009 QO_{11}	—	August 22, 2009	Sandlot	G. Hug	KOR	1.9 km	MPC · JPL
264027	2009 QN_{12}	—	August 16, 2009	Kitt Peak	Spacewatch	3:2	6.2 km	MPC · JPL
264028	2009 QV_{13}	—	August 16, 2009	Kitt Peak	Spacewatch	·	5.4 km	MPC · JPL
264029	2009 QB_{22}	—	August 20, 2009	La Sagra	OAM	T_{j} (2.98) · 3:2	4.6 km	MPC · JPL
264030	2009 QX_{25}	—	August 18, 2009	La Sagra	OAM	T_{j} (2.98) · 3:2	4.9 km	MPC · JPL
264031	2009 QV_{30}	—	August 23, 2009	La Sagra	OAM	·	4.5 km	MPC · JPL
264032	2009 QX_{31}	—	August 23, 2009	La Sagra	OAM	·	3.7 km	MPC · JPL
264033 Boris-Mikhail	2009 QS_{33}	Boris-Mikhail	August 26, 2009	Plana	Fratev, F.	WIT	1.2 km	MPC · JPL
264034	2009 QX_{39}	—	August 24, 2009	Črni Vrh	Matičič, S.	T_{j} (2.96) · HIL · 3:2	6.7 km	MPC · JPL
264035	2009 QB_{41}	—	August 26, 2009	Catalina	CSS	·	1.3 km	MPC · JPL
264036	2009 QZ_{51}	—	August 22, 2009	Tiki	Teamo, N.	AGN	1.2 km	MPC · JPL
264037	2009 QO_{52}	—	August 19, 2009	La Sagra	OAM	EOS	3.1 km	MPC · JPL
264038	2009 QG_{55}	—	August 27, 2009	Kitt Peak	Spacewatch	KOR	1.7 km	MPC · JPL
264039	2009 QO_{58}	—	August 18, 2009	Kitt Peak	Spacewatch	·	1.6 km	MPC · JPL
264040	2009 QZ_{59}	—	August 17, 2009	Kitt Peak	Spacewatch	·	3.3 km	MPC · JPL
264041	2009 RB_{3}	—	September 10, 2009	La Sagra	OAM	·	2.2 km	MPC · JPL
264042	2009 RU_{4}	—	September 14, 2009	Mayhill	Lowe, A.	·	1.1 km	MPC · JPL
264043	2009 RV_{6}	—	September 10, 2009	Catalina	CSS	·	3.2 km	MPC · JPL
264044	2009 RD_{20}	—	September 14, 2009	Catalina	CSS	·	5.2 km	MPC · JPL
264045 Heinerklinkrad	2009 RC_{26}	Heinerklinkrad	September 13, 2009	ESA OGS	Busch, M., Kresken, R.	·	3.5 km	MPC · JPL
264046	2009 RS_{29}	—	September 14, 2009	Kitt Peak	Spacewatch	·	1.9 km	MPC · JPL
264047	2009 RO_{30}	—	September 14, 2009	Kitt Peak	Spacewatch	AGN	1.3 km	MPC · JPL
264048	2009 RX_{33}	—	September 14, 2009	Kitt Peak	Spacewatch	L4	15 km	MPC · JPL
264049	2009 RX_{49}	—	September 15, 2009	Kitt Peak	Spacewatch	·	4.6 km	MPC · JPL
264050	2009 RJ_{52}	—	September 15, 2009	Kitt Peak	Spacewatch	L4	10 km	MPC · JPL
264051	2009 RD_{54}	—	September 15, 2009	Kitt Peak	Spacewatch	L4	9.4 km	MPC · JPL
264052	2009 RZ_{58}	—	September 15, 2009	LightBuckets	LightBuckets	·	2.7 km	MPC · JPL
264053	2009 RY_{62}	—	September 12, 2009	Kitt Peak	Spacewatch	L4	8.1 km	MPC · JPL
264054	2009 RK_{70}	—	September 12, 2009	Kitt Peak	Spacewatch	HYG	3.0 km	MPC · JPL
264055	2009 SY_{5}	—	September 16, 2009	Kitt Peak	Spacewatch	L4 · (8060)	9.1 km	MPC · JPL
264056	2009 SN_{18}	—	September 19, 2009	Altschwendt	W. Ries	·	2.0 km	MPC · JPL
264057	2009 SA_{26}	—	September 16, 2009	Kitt Peak	Spacewatch	L4	7.3 km	MPC · JPL
264058	2009 SP_{31}	—	September 16, 2009	Mount Lemmon	Mount Lemmon Survey	HOF	3.0 km	MPC · JPL
264059	2009 SP_{39}	—	September 16, 2009	Kitt Peak	Spacewatch	L4	10 km	MPC · JPL
264060	2009 SO_{75}	—	September 17, 2009	Kitt Peak	Spacewatch	L4	10 km	MPC · JPL
264061 Vitebsk	2009 SY_{100}	Vitebsk	September 23, 2009	Tzec Maun	Nevski, V.	CYB	4.8 km	MPC · JPL
264062	2009 SX_{101}	—	September 23, 2009	Dauban	Kugel, F.	·	4.0 km	MPC · JPL
264063	2009 SE_{107}	—	September 16, 2009	Mount Lemmon	Mount Lemmon Survey	HYG	3.3 km	MPC · JPL
264064	2009 SS_{115}	—	September 18, 2009	Kitt Peak	Spacewatch	·	1.6 km	MPC · JPL
264065	2009 SN_{136}	—	September 18, 2009	Kitt Peak	Spacewatch	L4	13 km	MPC · JPL
264066	2009 SR_{136}	—	September 18, 2009	Kitt Peak	Spacewatch	L4	11 km	MPC · JPL
264067	2009 SH_{139}	—	September 19, 2009	Kitt Peak	Spacewatch	THM	2.2 km	MPC · JPL
264068 Gudzinevičiūtė	2009 SQ_{148}	Gudzinevičiūtė	September 19, 2009	Moletai	K. Černis, Zdanavicius, J.	L4	10 km	MPC · JPL
264069	2009 SD_{150}	—	September 20, 2009	Kitt Peak	Spacewatch	HOF	2.8 km	MPC · JPL
264070	2009 SP_{153}	—	September 20, 2009	Kitt Peak	Spacewatch	·	3.3 km	MPC · JPL
264071	2009 SW_{159}	—	September 20, 2009	Kitt Peak	Spacewatch	L4 · ERY	9.3 km	MPC · JPL
264072	2009 ST_{169}	—	September 26, 2009	Wildberg	R. Apitzsch	NAE	3.2 km	MPC · JPL
264073	2009 SA_{184}	—	September 21, 2009	Kitt Peak	Spacewatch	L4	9.1 km	MPC · JPL
264074	2009 SF_{185}	—	September 21, 2009	Kitt Peak	Spacewatch	L4	10 km	MPC · JPL
264075	2009 ST_{185}	—	September 21, 2009	Kitt Peak	Spacewatch	L4	10 km	MPC · JPL
264076	2009 SM_{198}	—	September 22, 2009	Kitt Peak	Spacewatch	L4	11 km	MPC · JPL
264077 Dluzhnevskaya	2009 SH_{215}	Dluzhnevskaya	September 24, 2009	Zelenchukskaya Stn	T. V. Krjačko	·	2.4 km	MPC · JPL
264078	2009 SZ_{215}	—	September 24, 2009	Kitt Peak	Spacewatch	·	980 m	MPC · JPL
264079	2009 SK_{230}	—	September 16, 2009	Catalina	CSS	·	3.1 km	MPC · JPL
264080	2009 SN_{234}	—	September 16, 2009	Catalina	CSS	(32418)	2.2 km	MPC · JPL
264081	2009 SP_{238}	—	September 16, 2009	Catalina	CSS	·	4.5 km	MPC · JPL
264082	2009 SO_{240}	—	September 18, 2009	Catalina	CSS	MAR	1.6 km	MPC · JPL
264083	2009 SM_{246}	—	September 17, 2009	Kitt Peak	Spacewatch	L4	6.5 km	MPC · JPL
264084	2009 SN_{246}	—	September 17, 2009	Kitt Peak	Spacewatch	L4	8.4 km	MPC · JPL
264085	2009 SF_{247}	—	September 18, 2009	Kitt Peak	Spacewatch	L4	7.7 km	MPC · JPL
264086	2009 SN_{249}	—	September 18, 2009	Kitt Peak	Spacewatch	L4	9.5 km	MPC · JPL
264087	2009 SL_{252}	—	September 21, 2009	Kitt Peak	Spacewatch	L4	9.7 km	MPC · JPL
264088	2009 SL_{255}	—	September 16, 2009	Siding Spring	SSS	EUN	2.0 km	MPC · JPL
264089	2009 SJ_{256}	—	September 21, 2009	Mount Lemmon	Mount Lemmon Survey	L4	10 km	MPC · JPL
264090	2009 SL_{273}	—	September 25, 2009	Kitt Peak	Spacewatch	NEM	2.4 km	MPC · JPL
264091	2009 SR_{282}	—	September 25, 2009	Kitt Peak	Spacewatch	·	1.8 km	MPC · JPL
264092	2009 SM_{284}	—	September 25, 2009	Catalina	CSS	·	4.2 km	MPC · JPL
264093	2009 SK_{286}	—	September 25, 2009	Kitt Peak	Spacewatch	·	4.2 km	MPC · JPL
264094	2009 SS_{287}	—	September 25, 2009	Kitt Peak	Spacewatch	L4	10 km	MPC · JPL
264095	2009 SX_{288}	—	September 25, 2009	Catalina	CSS	THM	2.7 km	MPC · JPL
264096	2009 SC_{292}	—	September 26, 2009	Kitt Peak	Spacewatch	·	1.9 km	MPC · JPL
264097	2009 SK_{294}	—	September 27, 2009	Kitt Peak	Spacewatch	·	3.1 km	MPC · JPL
264098	2009 SB_{297}	—	September 28, 2009	Catalina	CSS	·	2.0 km	MPC · JPL
264099	2009 SY_{299}	—	September 17, 2009	Kitt Peak	Spacewatch	·	2.0 km	MPC · JPL
264100	2009 SO_{301}	—	September 16, 2009	Kitt Peak	Spacewatch	L4	8.7 km	MPC · JPL

== 264101–264200 ==
back to top

Designation			Discovery			Properties		Ref
Permanent	Provisional	Named after	Date	Site	Discoverer(s)	Category	Diam.	Ref
264101	2009 SN_{302}	—	September 16, 2009	Kitt Peak	Spacewatch	L4 · ERY	10 km	MPC · JPL
264102	2009 SE_{305}	—	October 3, 2003	Kitt Peak	Spacewatch	CYB	5.0 km	MPC · JPL
264103	2009 SF_{306}	—	September 17, 2009	Kitt Peak	Spacewatch	L4	8.8 km	MPC · JPL
264104	2009 SA_{311}	—	September 18, 2009	Kitt Peak	Spacewatch	CYB	3.7 km	MPC · JPL
264105	2009 SK_{329}	—	September 16, 2009	Mount Lemmon	Mount Lemmon Survey	·	2.7 km	MPC · JPL
264106	2009 SY_{330}	—	September 19, 2009	Catalina	CSS	HYG	3.9 km	MPC · JPL
264107	2009 SZ_{337}	—	September 28, 2009	Catalina	CSS	·	2.8 km	MPC · JPL
264108	2009 SH_{338}	—	September 24, 2009	Hibiscus	Teamo, N.	·	4.0 km	MPC · JPL
264109	2009 SK_{339}	—	September 22, 2009	La Sagra	OAM	L4	13 km	MPC · JPL
264110	2009 SL_{339}	—	September 23, 2009	Mount Lemmon	Mount Lemmon Survey	L4	13 km	MPC · JPL
264111	2009 SY_{340}	—	September 22, 2009	Kitt Peak	Spacewatch	·	3.5 km	MPC · JPL
264112	2009 SZ_{345}	—	September 22, 2009	Kitt Peak	Spacewatch	·	2.3 km	MPC · JPL
264113	2009 SA_{351}	—	September 28, 2009	Mount Lemmon	Mount Lemmon Survey	·	2.5 km	MPC · JPL
264114	2009 SK_{353}	—	September 26, 2009	Kitt Peak	Spacewatch	L4	8.8 km	MPC · JPL
264115	2009 SR_{354}	—	September 17, 2009	Kitt Peak	Spacewatch	3:2	6.9 km	MPC · JPL
264116	2009 SV_{355}	—	September 27, 2009	Kitt Peak	Spacewatch	L4	8.5 km	MPC · JPL
264117	2009 SX_{362}	—	September 22, 2009	Mount Lemmon	Mount Lemmon Survey	·	2.8 km	MPC · JPL
264118	2009 SX_{363}	—	September 26, 2009	Kitt Peak	Spacewatch	·	2.4 km	MPC · JPL
264119 Georgeorton	2009 TT_{7}	Georgeorton	October 13, 2009	Mayhill	Lowe, A.	L4	10 km	MPC · JPL
264120	2009 TJ_{10}	—	October 14, 2009	Nazaret	Muler, G.	L4	12 km	MPC · JPL
264121	2009 TD_{16}	—	October 2, 2009	Mount Lemmon	Mount Lemmon Survey	L4	11 km	MPC · JPL
264122	2009 TD_{22}	—	October 12, 2009	La Sagra	OAM	·	3.8 km	MPC · JPL
264123	2009 TG_{33}	—	September 18, 2009	Catalina	CSS	L4	20 km	MPC · JPL
264124	2009 TZ_{33}	—	October 9, 2009	Catalina	CSS	·	2.7 km	MPC · JPL
264125	2009 TE_{35}	—	October 14, 2009	La Sagra	OAM	L4 · ERY	15 km	MPC · JPL
264126	2009 TY_{38}	—	October 15, 2009	Catalina	CSS	EOS	2.9 km	MPC · JPL
264127	2009 TN_{39}	—	October 12, 2009	La Sagra	OAM	·	3.7 km	MPC · JPL
264128	2009 TH_{40}	—	October 15, 2009	Catalina	CSS	·	4.5 km	MPC · JPL
264129	2009 TP_{40}	—	October 15, 2009	Catalina	CSS	EOS	3.4 km	MPC · JPL
264130	2009 TK_{46}	—	October 1, 2009	Mount Lemmon	Mount Lemmon Survey	L4	17 km	MPC · JPL
264131 Bornim	2009 UQ_{4}	Bornim	October 19, 2009	Inastars	Thinius, B.	·	1.5 km	MPC · JPL
264132	2009 UC_{5}	—	October 17, 2009	La Sagra	OAM	L4	11 km	MPC · JPL
264133	2009 UX_{15}	—	October 17, 2009	La Cañada	Lacruz, J.	L4	10 km	MPC · JPL
264134	2009 UZ_{21}	—	October 16, 2009	Catalina	CSS	L4	14 km	MPC · JPL
264135	2009 UX_{50}	—	October 22, 2009	Catalina	CSS	L4	13 km	MPC · JPL
264136	2009 UE_{62}	—	October 17, 2009	Mount Lemmon	Mount Lemmon Survey	(11882)	2.2 km	MPC · JPL
264137	2009 UP_{71}	—	October 22, 2009	Catalina	CSS	(5)	1.6 km	MPC · JPL
264138	2009 UX_{77}	—	October 21, 2009	Mount Lemmon	Mount Lemmon Survey	L4	9.9 km	MPC · JPL
264139	2009 UP_{78}	—	October 21, 2009	Mount Lemmon	Mount Lemmon Survey	L4 · ERY	14 km	MPC · JPL
264140	2009 UD_{87}	—	October 24, 2009	Catalina	CSS	KOR	2.0 km	MPC · JPL
264141	2009 UG_{87}	—	October 24, 2009	Catalina	CSS	L4	14 km	MPC · JPL
264142	2009 UV_{88}	—	October 22, 2009	Catalina	CSS	·	5.9 km	MPC · JPL
264143	2009 UO_{90}	—	October 16, 2009	Catalina	CSS	·	3.4 km	MPC · JPL
264144	2009 UJ_{91}	—	October 18, 2009	La Sagra	OAM	L4	14 km	MPC · JPL
264145	2009 UY_{97}	—	October 23, 2009	Mount Lemmon	Mount Lemmon Survey	L4	12 km	MPC · JPL
264146	2009 UU_{98}	—	October 23, 2009	Mount Lemmon	Mount Lemmon Survey	·	2.5 km	MPC · JPL
264147	2009 UF_{132}	—	October 16, 2009	Catalina	CSS	L4	10 km	MPC · JPL
264148	2009 UD_{137}	—	October 27, 2009	Catalina	CSS	·	5.0 km	MPC · JPL
264149	2009 UD_{141}	—	October 26, 2009	Catalina	CSS	EMA	5.4 km	MPC · JPL
264150 Dolops	2009 VT_{24}	Dolops	November 10, 2009	Zelenchukskaya Stn	T. V. Krjačko	L4	9.7 km	MPC · JPL
264151	2009 VE_{76}	—	November 14, 2009	La Sagra	OAM	·	3.0 km	MPC · JPL
264152	2009 VC_{78}	—	November 9, 2009	Catalina	CSS	·	3.8 km	MPC · JPL
264153	2009 VH_{80}	—	November 11, 2009	Catalina	CSS	L4	15 km	MPC · JPL
264154	2009 VA_{107}	—	November 8, 2009	Catalina	CSS	L4	18 km	MPC · JPL
264155	2009 VJ_{109}	—	November 9, 2009	Mount Lemmon	Mount Lemmon Survey	L4	17 km	MPC · JPL
264156	2009 WV_{5}	—	November 17, 2009	Tzec Maun	D. Chestnov, A. Novichonok	L4 · (8060)	15 km	MPC · JPL
264157	2009 YM	—	December 18, 2009	Mount Lemmon	Mount Lemmon Survey	L4	20 km	MPC · JPL
264158	2010 AJ_{22}	—	January 6, 2010	Kitt Peak	Spacewatch	·	2.9 km	MPC · JPL
264159	2010 AS_{29}	—	January 8, 2010	Kitt Peak	Spacewatch	·	1.2 km	MPC · JPL
264160	2010 AJ_{32}	—	January 6, 2010	Kitt Peak	Spacewatch	·	3.3 km	MPC · JPL
264161	2010 AA_{100}	—	January 12, 2010	WISE	WISE	NAE	3.9 km	MPC · JPL
264162	2010 AL_{102}	—	January 12, 2010	WISE	WISE	CYB	5.4 km	MPC · JPL
264163	2010 AO_{103}	—	January 12, 2010	WISE	WISE	·	4.1 km	MPC · JPL
264164	2010 AV_{106}	—	January 12, 2010	WISE	WISE	L4	11 km	MPC · JPL
264165 Poehler	2010 AP_{120}	Poehler	January 14, 2010	WISE	WISE	URS	5.5 km	MPC · JPL
264166	2010 AA_{123}	—	October 5, 1996	Kitt Peak	Spacewatch	L4	16 km	MPC · JPL
264167	2010 BB_{65}	—	January 21, 2010	WISE	WISE	·	4.1 km	MPC · JPL
264168	2010 CW_{19}	—	February 14, 2010	Desert Moon	Stevens, B. L.	·	2.9 km	MPC · JPL
264169	2010 CW_{55}	—	February 12, 2010	Socorro	LINEAR	·	3.4 km	MPC · JPL
264170	2010 CE_{78}	—	February 13, 2010	Kitt Peak	Spacewatch	·	2.3 km	MPC · JPL
264171	2010 CF_{106}	—	February 14, 2010	Mount Lemmon	Mount Lemmon Survey	KOR	1.6 km	MPC · JPL
264172	2010 CE_{122}	—	February 15, 2010	Kitt Peak	Spacewatch	·	1.1 km	MPC · JPL
264173	2010 CQ_{127}	—	February 15, 2010	Mount Lemmon	Mount Lemmon Survey	HOF	2.9 km	MPC · JPL
264174	2010 CR_{149}	—	February 14, 2010	Kitt Peak	Spacewatch	KOR	3.1 km	MPC · JPL
264175	2010 DG_{20}	—	February 17, 2010	WISE	WISE	·	3.3 km	MPC · JPL
264176	2010 DA_{35}	—	February 16, 2010	Kitt Peak	Spacewatch	NYS	1.1 km	MPC · JPL
264177	2010 DF_{46}	—	February 17, 2010	Kitt Peak	Spacewatch	·	1.4 km	MPC · JPL
264178	2010 ED_{30}	—	March 5, 2010	Catalina	CSS	·	1.6 km	MPC · JPL
264179	2010 ED_{38}	—	March 12, 2010	Mount Lemmon	Mount Lemmon Survey	·	2.5 km	MPC · JPL
264180	2010 EF_{42}	—	March 12, 2010	Mount Lemmon	Mount Lemmon Survey	·	2.0 km	MPC · JPL
264181	2010 ET_{60}	—	March 13, 2010	WISE	WISE	·	5.1 km	MPC · JPL
264182	2010 EQ_{77}	—	March 12, 2010	Kitt Peak	Spacewatch	KOR	1.8 km	MPC · JPL
264183	2010 EQ_{104}	—	March 12, 2010	Catalina	CSS	HYG	3.5 km	MPC · JPL
264184	2010 EV_{120}	—	March 13, 2010	Kitt Peak	Spacewatch	CYB	6.1 km	MPC · JPL
264185	2010 EU_{126}	—	March 15, 2010	Catalina	CSS	·	5.8 km	MPC · JPL
264186	2010 EP_{135}	—	March 13, 2010	Kitt Peak	Spacewatch	·	3.7 km	MPC · JPL
264187	2010 FB_{12}	—	March 16, 2010	Kitt Peak	Spacewatch	·	2.0 km	MPC · JPL
264188	2010 FV_{15}	—	March 18, 2010	Kitt Peak	Spacewatch	KOR	1.5 km	MPC · JPL
264189	2010 FV_{55}	—	March 16, 2010	Mount Lemmon	Mount Lemmon Survey	·	3.1 km	MPC · JPL
264190	2010 FY_{93}	—	March 18, 2010	Mount Lemmon	Mount Lemmon Survey	CYB	6.0 km	MPC · JPL
264191	2010 GA_{27}	—	April 5, 2010	Kitt Peak	Spacewatch	·	3.6 km	MPC · JPL
264192	2010 GQ_{97}	—	April 8, 2010	Kitt Peak	Spacewatch	·	2.5 km	MPC · JPL
264193	2010 GL_{125}	—	April 8, 2010	Kitt Peak	Spacewatch	·	1.5 km	MPC · JPL
264194	2010 GN_{130}	—	April 8, 2010	Mount Lemmon	Mount Lemmon Survey	·	1.5 km	MPC · JPL
264195	2010 HX_{66}	—	April 26, 2010	WISE	WISE	·	2.8 km	MPC · JPL
264196	2010 JP_{40}	—	May 5, 2010	Nogales	Tenagra II	·	5.4 km	MPC · JPL
264197	2010 JL_{73}	—	May 7, 2010	Mount Lemmon	Mount Lemmon Survey	EUN	2.0 km	MPC · JPL
264198	2010 JY_{116}	—	May 7, 2010	Catalina	CSS	·	1.9 km	MPC · JPL
264199	2010 LV_{45}	—	June 8, 2010	WISE	WISE	ERI	2.3 km	MPC · JPL
264200	2010 MZ_{52}	—	October 20, 1995	Kitt Peak	Spacewatch	NAE	3.3 km	MPC · JPL

== 264201–264300 ==
back to top

Designation			Discovery			Properties		Ref
Permanent	Provisional	Named after	Date	Site	Discoverer(s)	Category	Diam.	Ref
264201	2010 NO_{9}	—	July 4, 2010	WISE	WISE	LIX	3.9 km	MPC · JPL
264202	2010 NS_{20}	—	November 9, 1999	Socorro	LINEAR	·	4.8 km	MPC · JPL
264203	2010 NH_{51}	—	October 22, 2005	Kitt Peak	Spacewatch	·	4.4 km	MPC · JPL
264204	2010 NQ_{53}	—	September 21, 2003	Kitt Peak	Spacewatch	·	1.6 km	MPC · JPL
264205	2010 OK_{52}	—	February 4, 2000	Socorro	LINEAR	·	2.7 km	MPC · JPL
264206	2010 OM_{68}	—	May 28, 2000	Kitt Peak	Spacewatch	·	3.2 km	MPC · JPL
264207	2010 OO_{118}	—	January 7, 2006	Catalina	CSS	EUP	5.0 km	MPC · JPL
264208	2010 OC_{126}	—	August 21, 2004	Siding Spring	SSS	·	4.0 km	MPC · JPL
264209	2010 PD_{5}	—	April 30, 2005	Kitt Peak	Spacewatch	·	1.4 km	MPC · JPL
264210	2010 PF_{22}	—	October 11, 2004	Kitt Peak	Spacewatch	T_{j} (2.99)	4.6 km	MPC · JPL
264211	2010 PU_{35}	—	September 30, 2003	Kitt Peak	Spacewatch	CYB	6.6 km	MPC · JPL
264212	2010 PF_{37}	—	July 4, 2005	Kitt Peak	Spacewatch	·	3.5 km	MPC · JPL
264213	2010 RM_{39}	—	October 13, 1999	Socorro	LINEAR	·	1.5 km	MPC · JPL
264214	2010 RZ_{47}	—	September 20, 2001	Socorro	LINEAR	·	1.7 km	MPC · JPL
264215	2010 RP_{51}	—	November 20, 2000	Socorro	LINEAR	·	840 m	MPC · JPL
264216	2010 RZ_{51}	—	February 11, 2004	Palomar	NEAT	MAS	980 m	MPC · JPL
264217	2010 RB_{52}	—	February 14, 2004	Kitt Peak	Spacewatch	MAS	880 m	MPC · JPL
264218	2010 RU_{52}	—	August 1, 2000	Socorro	LINEAR	·	740 m	MPC · JPL
264219	2010 RV_{63}	—	May 6, 2006	Mount Lemmon	Mount Lemmon Survey	·	840 m	MPC · JPL
264220	2010 RX_{69}	—	September 7, 1999	Socorro	LINEAR	MAS	910 m	MPC · JPL
264221	2010 RF_{75}	—	July 31, 2000	Cerro Tololo	Deep Ecliptic Survey	·	2.1 km	MPC · JPL
264222	2010 RJ_{97}	—	January 17, 2004	Kitt Peak	Spacewatch	NYS	1.3 km	MPC · JPL
264223	2010 RC_{106}	—	March 23, 2006	Mount Lemmon	Mount Lemmon Survey	·	720 m	MPC · JPL
264224	2010 RL_{123}	—	March 4, 2005	Catalina	CSS	V	730 m	MPC · JPL
264225	2010 RH_{145}	—	September 19, 2001	Socorro	LINEAR	·	2.0 km	MPC · JPL
264226	2010 RT_{153}	—	October 1, 2005	Mount Lemmon	Mount Lemmon Survey	EOS	2.1 km	MPC · JPL
264227	2010 RM_{154}	—	October 21, 2006	Mount Lemmon	Mount Lemmon Survey	·	1.5 km	MPC · JPL
264228	2010 RS_{166}	—	September 22, 2003	Anderson Mesa	LONEOS	·	890 m	MPC · JPL
264229	2010 SP_{6}	—	October 1, 2003	Kitt Peak	Spacewatch	·	830 m	MPC · JPL
264230	2010 SP_{10}	—	May 31, 2001	Kitt Peak	Spacewatch	·	1.4 km	MPC · JPL
264231	2010 SR_{19}	—	June 22, 2001	Palomar	NEAT	·	2.2 km	MPC · JPL
264232	2010 SR_{31}	—	September 1, 2005	Kitt Peak	Spacewatch	·	2.5 km	MPC · JPL
264233	2010 SB_{34}	—	June 28, 1997	Socorro	LINEAR	·	1.1 km	MPC · JPL
264234	2010 SF_{36}	—	December 18, 2007	Mount Lemmon	Mount Lemmon Survey	·	1.3 km	MPC · JPL
264235	2010 TT_{6}	—	January 16, 2001	Haleakala	NEAT	·	3.1 km	MPC · JPL
264236	2010 TG_{13}	—	May 19, 2002	Palomar	NEAT	·	1.4 km	MPC · JPL
264237	2010 TZ_{18}	—	August 27, 2005	Anderson Mesa	LONEOS	·	2.9 km	MPC · JPL
264238	2010 TX_{47}	—	August 31, 2000	Kitt Peak	Spacewatch	KOR	1.5 km	MPC · JPL
264239	2010 TP_{72}	—	March 15, 2004	Kitt Peak	Spacewatch	·	1.6 km	MPC · JPL
264240	2010 TZ_{79}	—	April 15, 1997	Kitt Peak	Spacewatch	(31811)	4.3 km	MPC · JPL
264241	2010 TZ_{115}	—	November 10, 1993	Kitt Peak	Spacewatch	·	2.0 km	MPC · JPL
264242	2010 TO_{131}	—	October 28, 1997	Kitt Peak	Spacewatch	·	820 m	MPC · JPL
264243	2010 UH_{5}	—	September 9, 2004	Palomar	NEAT	·	4.2 km	MPC · JPL
264244	2010 UA_{29}	—	March 17, 2005	Kitt Peak	Spacewatch	·	1.2 km	MPC · JPL
264245	2010 UQ_{55}	—	January 19, 2004	Kitt Peak	Spacewatch	MAS	730 m	MPC · JPL
264246	2010 UP_{58}	—	October 18, 2001	Palomar	NEAT	·	2.0 km	MPC · JPL
264247	2010 VD_{129}	—	September 11, 2004	Kitt Peak	Spacewatch	THM	2.8 km	MPC · JPL
264248	2176 P-L	—	September 24, 1960	Palomar	C. J. van Houten, I. van Houten-Groeneveld, T. Gehrels	·	1.2 km	MPC · JPL
264249	4539 P-L	—	September 24, 1960	Palomar	C. J. van Houten, I. van Houten-Groeneveld, T. Gehrels	RAF	1.4 km	MPC · JPL
264250	1447 T-2	—	September 29, 1973	Palomar	C. J. van Houten, I. van Houten-Groeneveld, T. Gehrels	·	2.8 km	MPC · JPL
264251	3301 T-2	—	September 30, 1973	Palomar	C. J. van Houten, I. van Houten-Groeneveld, T. Gehrels	·	1.2 km	MPC · JPL
264252	4205 T-2	—	September 29, 1973	Palomar	C. J. van Houten, I. van Houten-Groeneveld, T. Gehrels	·	860 m	MPC · JPL
264253	1104 T-3	—	October 17, 1977	Palomar	C. J. van Houten, I. van Houten-Groeneveld, T. Gehrels	DOR	3.0 km	MPC · JPL
264254	2259 T-3	—	October 16, 1977	Palomar	C. J. van Houten, I. van Houten-Groeneveld, T. Gehrels	·	910 m	MPC · JPL
264255	2323 T-3	—	October 16, 1977	Palomar	C. J. van Houten, I. van Houten-Groeneveld, T. Gehrels	(5)	2.1 km	MPC · JPL
264256	3031 T-3	—	October 16, 1977	Palomar	C. J. van Houten, I. van Houten-Groeneveld, T. Gehrels	·	1.7 km	MPC · JPL
264257	4114 T-3	—	October 16, 1977	Palomar	C. J. van Houten, I. van Houten-Groeneveld, T. Gehrels	·	1.2 km	MPC · JPL
264258	4232 T-3	—	October 16, 1977	Palomar	C. J. van Houten, I. van Houten-Groeneveld, T. Gehrels	·	2.8 km	MPC · JPL
264259	1979 MC_{4}	—	June 25, 1979	Siding Spring	E. F. Helin, S. J. Bus	·	1.1 km	MPC · JPL
264260	1993 FV_{35}	—	March 19, 1993	La Silla	UESAC	NYS	1.5 km	MPC · JPL
264261	1994 EE_{5}	—	March 6, 1994	Kitt Peak	Spacewatch	·	610 m	MPC · JPL
264262	1994 PF_{4}	—	August 10, 1994	La Silla	E. W. Elst	NYS	1.6 km	MPC · JPL
264263	1994 YS_{3}	—	December 31, 1994	Kitt Peak	Spacewatch	·	4.2 km	MPC · JPL
264264	1995 CB_{5}	—	February 1, 1995	Kitt Peak	Spacewatch	·	750 m	MPC · JPL
264265	1995 GW_{1}	—	April 1, 1995	Kitt Peak	Spacewatch	HYG	3.7 km	MPC · JPL
264266	1995 HW_{2}	—	April 25, 1995	Kitt Peak	Spacewatch	·	860 m	MPC · JPL
264267	1995 SC_{33}	—	September 21, 1995	Kitt Peak	Spacewatch	·	1.4 km	MPC · JPL
264268	1995 UE_{18}	—	October 18, 1995	Kitt Peak	Spacewatch	·	1.1 km	MPC · JPL
264269	1995 UJ_{40}	—	October 23, 1995	Kitt Peak	Spacewatch	·	2.5 km	MPC · JPL
264270	1995 UX_{51}	—	October 20, 1995	Kitt Peak	Spacewatch	·	860 m	MPC · JPL
264271	1995 US_{80}	—	October 25, 1995	Kitt Peak	Spacewatch	HOF	3.3 km	MPC · JPL
264272	1995 VJ_{6}	—	November 14, 1995	Kitt Peak	Spacewatch	KOR	1.6 km	MPC · JPL
264273	1995 VF_{16}	—	November 15, 1995	Kitt Peak	Spacewatch	·	1.9 km	MPC · JPL
264274	1996 JG_{11}	—	May 15, 1996	Kitt Peak	Spacewatch	·	4.0 km	MPC · JPL
264275	1996 YF_{1}	—	December 27, 1996	Modra	A. Galád, A. Pravda	·	1.0 km	MPC · JPL
264276	1997 LM_{5}	—	June 8, 1997	Kitt Peak	Spacewatch	EOS	2.3 km	MPC · JPL
264277	1997 NN_{3}	—	July 5, 1997	Kitt Peak	Spacewatch	·	1.8 km	MPC · JPL
264278	1997 SO_{19}	—	September 28, 1997	Kitt Peak	Spacewatch	EOS	2.5 km	MPC · JPL
264279	1997 SK_{30}	—	September 30, 1997	Kitt Peak	Spacewatch	·	1.4 km	MPC · JPL
264280	1997 WM_{14}	—	November 22, 1997	Kitt Peak	Spacewatch	·	1.2 km	MPC · JPL
264281	1998 DO_{31}	—	February 23, 1998	Xinglong	SCAP	·	2.6 km	MPC · JPL
264282	1998 FE_{63}	—	March 20, 1998	Socorro	LINEAR	·	3.2 km	MPC · JPL
264283	1998 FG_{137}	—	March 28, 1998	Socorro	LINEAR	·	2.5 km	MPC · JPL
264284	1998 GP_{8}	—	April 2, 1998	Socorro	LINEAR	·	3.9 km	MPC · JPL
264285	1998 QM	—	August 17, 1998	Socorro	LINEAR	·	1.8 km	MPC · JPL
264286	1998 QN_{5}	—	August 17, 1998	Socorro	LINEAR	PHO	1.2 km	MPC · JPL
264287	1998 QT_{99}	—	August 26, 1998	La Silla	E. W. Elst	·	1.9 km	MPC · JPL
264288	1998 RY_{45}	—	September 14, 1998	Socorro	LINEAR	·	2.5 km	MPC · JPL
264289	1998 SG_{6}	—	September 20, 1998	Kitt Peak	Spacewatch	·	1.7 km	MPC · JPL
264290	1998 SD_{27}	—	September 20, 1998	Xinglong	SCAP	·	1.5 km	MPC · JPL
264291	1998 SD_{37}	—	September 21, 1998	Kitt Peak	Spacewatch	EOS	2.9 km	MPC · JPL
264292	1998 SA_{38}	—	September 23, 1998	Kitt Peak	Spacewatch	MAS	840 m	MPC · JPL
264293	1998 ST_{96}	—	September 26, 1998	Socorro	LINEAR	NYS	1.2 km	MPC · JPL
264294	1998 TH_{10}	—	October 12, 1998	Kitt Peak	Spacewatch	THM	2.6 km	MPC · JPL
264295	1998 TY_{11}	—	October 13, 1998	Kitt Peak	Spacewatch	·	1.3 km	MPC · JPL
264296	1998 TR_{20}	—	October 13, 1998	Kitt Peak	Spacewatch	V	1.0 km	MPC · JPL
264297	1998 VK_{34}	—	November 10, 1998	Caussols	ODAS	·	1.5 km	MPC · JPL
264298	1998 WR_{7}	—	November 16, 1998	Fair Oaks Ranch	J. V. McClusky	·	1.8 km	MPC · JPL
264299	1998 XE_{20}	—	December 10, 1998	Kitt Peak	Spacewatch	EOS	2.9 km	MPC · JPL
264300	1998 YF_{15}	—	December 22, 1998	Kitt Peak	Spacewatch	·	3.7 km	MPC · JPL

== 264301–264400 ==
back to top

Designation			Discovery			Properties		Ref
Permanent	Provisional	Named after	Date	Site	Discoverer(s)	Category	Diam.	Ref
264301	1999 AW_{29}	—	January 13, 1999	Kitt Peak	Spacewatch	·	850 m	MPC · JPL
264302	1999 CG_{51}	—	February 10, 1999	Socorro	LINEAR	(5)	2.0 km	MPC · JPL
264303	1999 FQ_{63}	—	March 20, 1999	Apache Point	SDSS	·	5.3 km	MPC · JPL
264304	1999 FQ_{78}	—	March 20, 1999	Apache Point	SDSS	·	2.3 km	MPC · JPL
264305	1999 KF_{12}	—	May 18, 1999	Socorro	LINEAR	·	1.7 km	MPC · JPL
264306	1999 LW_{12}	—	June 9, 1999	Socorro	LINEAR	·	3.1 km	MPC · JPL
264307	1999 LE_{29}	—	June 9, 1999	Kitt Peak	Spacewatch	·	1.8 km	MPC · JPL
264308	1999 NA_{5}	—	July 13, 1999	Socorro	LINEAR	AMO	290 m	MPC · JPL
264309	1999 RW_{12}	—	September 7, 1999	Socorro	LINEAR	·	4.4 km	MPC · JPL
264310	1999 RH_{95}	—	September 7, 1999	Socorro	LINEAR	·	950 m	MPC · JPL
264311	1999 RS_{157}	—	September 9, 1999	Socorro	LINEAR	NYS	1.5 km	MPC · JPL
264312	1999 RY_{168}	—	September 9, 1999	Socorro	LINEAR	·	960 m	MPC · JPL
264313	1999 TR_{23}	—	October 3, 1999	Kitt Peak	Spacewatch	·	800 m	MPC · JPL
264314	1999 TZ_{69}	—	October 9, 1999	Kitt Peak	Spacewatch	·	1.8 km	MPC · JPL
264315	1999 TK_{84}	—	October 13, 1999	Kitt Peak	Spacewatch	·	970 m	MPC · JPL
264316	1999 TS_{117}	—	October 4, 1999	Socorro	LINEAR	·	1 km	MPC · JPL
264317	1999 TY_{134}	—	October 6, 1999	Socorro	LINEAR	·	2.3 km	MPC · JPL
264318	1999 TU_{145}	—	October 7, 1999	Socorro	LINEAR	NYS	1.0 km	MPC · JPL
264319	1999 TD_{155}	—	October 7, 1999	Socorro	LINEAR	·	1.1 km	MPC · JPL
264320	1999 TS_{156}	—	October 8, 1999	Socorro	LINEAR	·	980 m	MPC · JPL
264321	1999 TT_{209}	—	October 14, 1999	Socorro	LINEAR	·	950 m	MPC · JPL
264322	1999 TZ_{249}	—	October 9, 1999	Catalina	CSS	·	2.3 km	MPC · JPL
264323	1999 TP_{263}	—	October 15, 1999	Kitt Peak	Spacewatch	·	2.1 km	MPC · JPL
264324	1999 TW_{266}	—	October 3, 1999	Socorro	LINEAR	·	1.1 km	MPC · JPL
264325	1999 TW_{283}	—	October 9, 1999	Socorro	LINEAR	·	1.1 km	MPC · JPL
264326	1999 TP_{286}	—	October 10, 1999	Socorro	LINEAR	·	1.7 km	MPC · JPL
264327	1999 TU_{301}	—	October 3, 1999	Kitt Peak	Spacewatch	·	2.1 km	MPC · JPL
264328	1999 UA_{21}	—	October 20, 1999	Kitt Peak	Spacewatch	THM	2.2 km	MPC · JPL
264329	1999 UN_{21}	—	October 31, 1999	Kitt Peak	Spacewatch	·	680 m	MPC · JPL
264330	1999 UB_{37}	—	October 16, 1999	Kitt Peak	Spacewatch	·	3.9 km	MPC · JPL
264331	1999 UG_{47}	—	October 29, 1999	Catalina	CSS	V	880 m	MPC · JPL
264332	1999 VJ_{61}	—	November 4, 1999	Socorro	LINEAR	NYS	1.1 km	MPC · JPL
264333	1999 VE_{101}	—	November 9, 1999	Socorro	LINEAR	·	940 m	MPC · JPL
264334	1999 VT_{116}	—	November 5, 1999	Kitt Peak	Spacewatch	EOS	1.9 km	MPC · JPL
264335	1999 VD_{139}	—	November 9, 1999	Kitt Peak	Spacewatch	·	1.8 km	MPC · JPL
264336	1999 VV_{139}	—	November 10, 1999	Kitt Peak	Spacewatch	·	2.6 km	MPC · JPL
264337	1999 VN_{141}	—	November 10, 1999	Kitt Peak	Spacewatch	KOR	1.4 km	MPC · JPL
264338	1999 VZ_{151}	—	November 9, 1999	Kitt Peak	Spacewatch	·	2.1 km	MPC · JPL
264339	1999 VR_{163}	—	November 14, 1999	Socorro	LINEAR	NYS	1.5 km	MPC · JPL
264340	1999 XE_{15}	—	December 6, 1999	Socorro	LINEAR	·	2.5 km	MPC · JPL
264341	1999 XF_{17}	—	December 7, 1999	Socorro	LINEAR	·	2.8 km	MPC · JPL
264342	1999 XN_{49}	—	December 7, 1999	Socorro	LINEAR	NYS	1.1 km	MPC · JPL
264343	1999 XQ_{50}	—	December 7, 1999	Socorro	LINEAR	·	1.4 km	MPC · JPL
264344	1999 XT_{56}	—	December 7, 1999	Socorro	LINEAR	·	3.4 km	MPC · JPL
264345	1999 XN_{59}	—	December 7, 1999	Socorro	LINEAR	EOS	3.2 km	MPC · JPL
264346	1999 XE_{106}	—	December 11, 1999	Prescott	P. G. Comba	H	760 m	MPC · JPL
264347	1999 XZ_{135}	—	December 13, 1999	Socorro	LINEAR	·	3.0 km	MPC · JPL
264348	1999 XJ_{137}	—	December 15, 1999	Prescott	P. G. Comba	·	1.4 km	MPC · JPL
264349	1999 XH_{148}	—	December 7, 1999	Kitt Peak	Spacewatch	EOS	2.5 km	MPC · JPL
264350	1999 XV_{232}	—	December 12, 1999	Socorro	LINEAR	H	780 m	MPC · JPL
264351	1999 XY_{233}	—	December 4, 1999	Anderson Mesa	LONEOS	·	1.5 km	MPC · JPL
264352	1999 XF_{235}	—	December 5, 1999	Catalina	CSS	·	5.6 km	MPC · JPL
264353	1999 YR_{7}	—	December 27, 1999	Kitt Peak	Spacewatch	V	920 m	MPC · JPL
264354	2000 AJ_{20}	—	January 3, 2000	Socorro	LINEAR	·	3.6 km	MPC · JPL
264355	2000 AN_{28}	—	January 5, 2000	Kitt Peak	Spacewatch	NYS	1.0 km	MPC · JPL
264356	2000 AB_{45}	—	January 5, 2000	Kitt Peak	Spacewatch	·	1.2 km	MPC · JPL
264357	2000 AZ_{93}	—	January 7, 2000	Socorro	LINEAR	ATE · PHA	110 m	MPC · JPL
264358	2000 AY_{133}	—	January 4, 2000	Socorro	LINEAR	·	1.6 km	MPC · JPL
264359	2000 AC_{211}	—	January 5, 2000	Kitt Peak	Spacewatch	·	990 m	MPC · JPL
264360	2000 AL_{236}	—	January 5, 2000	Kitt Peak	Spacewatch	·	1.4 km	MPC · JPL
264361	2000 BV_{5}	—	January 27, 2000	Socorro	LINEAR	·	3.2 km	MPC · JPL
264362	2000 BA_{25}	—	January 30, 2000	Socorro	LINEAR	·	1.5 km	MPC · JPL
264363	2000 BE_{42}	—	January 31, 2000	Kitt Peak	Spacewatch	·	3.7 km	MPC · JPL
264364	2000 CC_{56}	—	February 4, 2000	Socorro	LINEAR	ERI	2.2 km	MPC · JPL
264365	2000 CH_{79}	—	February 8, 2000	Kitt Peak	Spacewatch	·	1.2 km	MPC · JPL
264366	2000 CA_{99}	—	February 8, 2000	Kitt Peak	Spacewatch	NYS	1 km	MPC · JPL
264367	2000 CZ_{104}	—	February 5, 2000	Kitt Peak	M. W. Buie	EOS	2.4 km	MPC · JPL
264368	2000 CZ_{109}	—	February 5, 2000	Kitt Peak	M. W. Buie	·	1.6 km	MPC · JPL
264369	2000 CH_{132}	—	February 3, 2000	Kitt Peak	Spacewatch	MAS	840 m	MPC · JPL
264370	2000 DZ_{8}	—	February 26, 2000	Kitt Peak	Spacewatch	·	2.6 km	MPC · JPL
264371	2000 DO_{9}	—	February 26, 2000	Kitt Peak	Spacewatch	·	2.9 km	MPC · JPL
264372	2000 DK_{10}	—	February 26, 2000	Kitt Peak	Spacewatch	·	2.3 km	MPC · JPL
264373	2000 DO_{16}	—	February 29, 2000	Socorro	LINEAR	H	830 m	MPC · JPL
264374	2000 DC_{23}	—	February 29, 2000	Socorro	LINEAR	·	3.0 km	MPC · JPL
264375	2000 DG_{30}	—	February 29, 2000	Socorro	LINEAR	·	6.4 km	MPC · JPL
264376	2000 DE_{31}	—	February 29, 2000	Socorro	LINEAR	V	970 m	MPC · JPL
264377	2000 DQ_{32}	—	February 29, 2000	Socorro	LINEAR	·	1.7 km	MPC · JPL
264378	2000 DP_{43}	—	February 29, 2000	Socorro	LINEAR	·	3.6 km	MPC · JPL
264379	2000 DY_{47}	—	February 29, 2000	Socorro	LINEAR	·	1.6 km	MPC · JPL
264380	2000 DQ_{48}	—	February 29, 2000	Socorro	LINEAR	·	1.3 km	MPC · JPL
264381	2000 DB_{52}	—	February 29, 2000	Socorro	LINEAR	·	2.0 km	MPC · JPL
264382	2000 DW_{62}	—	February 29, 2000	Socorro	LINEAR	·	4.7 km	MPC · JPL
264383	2000 DN_{69}	—	February 29, 2000	Socorro	LINEAR	NYS	1.9 km	MPC · JPL
264384	2000 DC_{77}	—	February 29, 2000	Socorro	LINEAR	·	2.9 km	MPC · JPL
264385	2000 DR_{85}	—	February 29, 2000	Socorro	LINEAR	·	1.4 km	MPC · JPL
264386	2000 DH_{87}	—	February 29, 2000	Socorro	LINEAR	·	1.5 km	MPC · JPL
264387	2000 DR_{89}	—	February 26, 2000	Kitt Peak	Spacewatch	L4	11 km	MPC · JPL
264388	2000 DY_{89}	—	February 27, 2000	Kitt Peak	Spacewatch	·	1.4 km	MPC · JPL
264389	2000 DF_{91}	—	February 27, 2000	Kitt Peak	Spacewatch	HYG	3.0 km	MPC · JPL
264390	2000 DQ_{91}	—	February 27, 2000	Kitt Peak	Spacewatch	·	4.5 km	MPC · JPL
264391	2000 EM_{2}	—	March 3, 2000	Socorro	LINEAR	·	1.4 km	MPC · JPL
264392	2000 EZ_{8}	—	March 3, 2000	Socorro	LINEAR	TIR	4.2 km	MPC · JPL
264393	2000 ET_{9}	—	March 3, 2000	Socorro	LINEAR	·	6.0 km	MPC · JPL
264394	2000 EW_{21}	—	March 5, 2000	Socorro	LINEAR	H	990 m	MPC · JPL
264395	2000 EZ_{26}	—	March 3, 2000	Socorro	LINEAR	V	870 m	MPC · JPL
264396	2000 EP_{52}	—	March 3, 2000	Kitt Peak	Spacewatch	·	1.2 km	MPC · JPL
264397	2000 EB_{100}	—	March 12, 2000	Kitt Peak	Spacewatch	·	1.8 km	MPC · JPL
264398	2000 EY_{115}	—	March 10, 2000	Kitt Peak	Spacewatch	·	1.4 km	MPC · JPL
264399	2000 EP_{133}	—	March 11, 2000	Socorro	LINEAR	·	1.5 km	MPC · JPL
264400	2000 EH_{138}	—	March 11, 2000	Socorro	LINEAR	·	1.3 km	MPC · JPL

== 264401–264500 ==
back to top

Designation			Discovery			Properties		Ref
Permanent	Provisional	Named after	Date	Site	Discoverer(s)	Category	Diam.	Ref
264401	2000 EK_{200}	—	March 1, 2000	Catalina	CSS	·	5.1 km	MPC · JPL
264402	2000 FG_{14}	—	March 30, 2000	Kitt Peak	Spacewatch	·	1.2 km	MPC · JPL
264403	2000 FZ_{57}	—	March 26, 2000	Anderson Mesa	LONEOS	·	1.9 km	MPC · JPL
264404	2000 FU_{70}	—	March 29, 2000	Kitt Peak	Spacewatch	·	1.6 km	MPC · JPL
264405	2000 GX_{1}	—	April 4, 2000	Socorro	LINEAR	H	880 m	MPC · JPL
264406	2000 GJ_{11}	—	April 5, 2000	Socorro	LINEAR	·	1.2 km	MPC · JPL
264407	2000 GG_{25}	—	April 5, 2000	Socorro	LINEAR	·	1.7 km	MPC · JPL
264408	2000 GL_{48}	—	April 5, 2000	Socorro	LINEAR	MAS	890 m	MPC · JPL
264409	2000 GM_{115}	—	April 8, 2000	Socorro	LINEAR	THB	5.7 km	MPC · JPL
264410	2000 GC_{120}	—	April 5, 2000	Kitt Peak	Spacewatch	NYS	1.2 km	MPC · JPL
264411	2000 HK_{74}	—	April 30, 2000	Haleakala	NEAT	T_{j} (2.99) · EUP	5.0 km	MPC · JPL
264412	2000 JS_{34}	—	April 28, 2000	Kitt Peak	Spacewatch	·	1.7 km	MPC · JPL
264413	2000 LU_{28}	—	June 5, 2000	Anderson Mesa	LONEOS	·	2.0 km	MPC · JPL
264414	2000 OW_{2}	—	July 29, 2000	Lake Tekapo	Lake Tekapo	·	3.3 km	MPC · JPL
264415	2000 PR_{10}	—	August 1, 2000	Socorro	LINEAR	·	3.0 km	MPC · JPL
264416	2000 PZ_{17}	—	August 1, 2000	Socorro	LINEAR	·	2.6 km	MPC · JPL
264417	2000 QQ_{48}	—	August 24, 2000	Socorro	LINEAR	·	2.2 km	MPC · JPL
264418	2000 QR_{94}	—	August 26, 2000	Socorro	LINEAR	·	2.6 km	MPC · JPL
264419	2000 QM_{162}	—	August 31, 2000	Socorro	LINEAR	·	2.7 km	MPC · JPL
264420	2000 QY_{165}	—	August 31, 2000	Socorro	LINEAR	·	2.6 km	MPC · JPL
264421	2000 QF_{204}	—	August 29, 2000	Socorro	LINEAR	·	980 m	MPC · JPL
264422	2000 QX_{219}	—	August 21, 2000	Anderson Mesa	LONEOS	·	1.8 km	MPC · JPL
264423	2000 QA_{231}	—	August 31, 2000	Kvistaberg	Uppsala-DLR Asteroid Survey	·	4.1 km	MPC · JPL
264424	2000 RE	—	September 1, 2000	Socorro	LINEAR	·	2.7 km	MPC · JPL
264425	2000 RU_{28}	—	September 1, 2000	Socorro	LINEAR	EUN	1.7 km	MPC · JPL
264426	2000 RY_{74}	—	September 3, 2000	Socorro	LINEAR	·	2.4 km	MPC · JPL
264427	2000 RE_{85}	—	September 2, 2000	Anderson Mesa	LONEOS	·	3.6 km	MPC · JPL
264428	2000 RX_{89}	—	September 3, 2000	Socorro	LINEAR	·	2.5 km	MPC · JPL
264429	2000 SE_{15}	—	September 23, 2000	Socorro	LINEAR	·	2.8 km	MPC · JPL
264430	2000 SW_{46}	—	September 23, 2000	Socorro	LINEAR	ADE	4.2 km	MPC · JPL
264431	2000 SP_{74}	—	September 24, 2000	Socorro	LINEAR	·	850 m	MPC · JPL
264432	2000 ST_{96}	—	September 23, 2000	Socorro	LINEAR	·	2.7 km	MPC · JPL
264433	2000 SN_{140}	—	September 23, 2000	Socorro	LINEAR	·	3.3 km	MPC · JPL
264434	2000 SH_{164}	—	September 25, 2000	Socorro	LINEAR	(194)	2.5 km	MPC · JPL
264435	2000 SG_{166}	—	September 23, 2000	Socorro	LINEAR	·	1.9 km	MPC · JPL
264436	2000 SY_{167}	—	September 23, 2000	Socorro	LINEAR	·	1.0 km	MPC · JPL
264437	2000 SM_{200}	—	September 24, 2000	Socorro	LINEAR	·	3.2 km	MPC · JPL
264438	2000 SO_{214}	—	September 26, 2000	Socorro	LINEAR	·	2.0 km	MPC · JPL
264439	2000 SA_{231}	—	September 28, 2000	Socorro	LINEAR	·	1.2 km	MPC · JPL
264440	2000 SW_{256}	—	September 24, 2000	Socorro	LINEAR	AGN	1.9 km	MPC · JPL
264441	2000 SR_{286}	—	September 26, 2000	Socorro	LINEAR	·	2.2 km	MPC · JPL
264442	2000 SP_{289}	—	September 27, 2000	Socorro	LINEAR	·	2.9 km	MPC · JPL
264443	2000 SC_{316}	—	September 30, 2000	Socorro	LINEAR	·	2.8 km	MPC · JPL
264444	2000 SP_{320}	—	September 30, 2000	Kitt Peak	Spacewatch	·	1.6 km	MPC · JPL
264445	2000 SW_{371}	—	September 23, 2000	Anderson Mesa	LONEOS	·	3.1 km	MPC · JPL
264446	2000 SZ_{371}	—	September 24, 2000	Socorro	LINEAR	·	1.2 km	MPC · JPL
264447	2000 TK_{26}	—	October 2, 2000	Socorro	LINEAR	EUN	2.0 km	MPC · JPL
264448	2000 TT_{29}	—	October 4, 2000	Socorro	LINEAR	·	2.6 km	MPC · JPL
264449	2000 UB_{17}	—	October 24, 2000	Socorro	LINEAR	fast	970 m	MPC · JPL
264450	2000 UV_{56}	—	October 25, 2000	Socorro	LINEAR	·	2.9 km	MPC · JPL
264451	2000 UP_{82}	—	October 29, 2000	Socorro	LINEAR	·	3.1 km	MPC · JPL
264452	2000 UJ_{98}	—	October 25, 2000	Socorro	LINEAR	·	710 m	MPC · JPL
264453	2000 VD_{9}	—	November 1, 2000	Socorro	LINEAR	·	2.3 km	MPC · JPL
264454	2000 WW_{13}	—	November 20, 2000	Socorro	LINEAR	·	1.3 km	MPC · JPL
264455	2000 WL_{26}	—	November 25, 2000	Socorro	LINEAR	·	2.6 km	MPC · JPL
264456	2000 YW_{88}	—	December 30, 2000	Socorro	LINEAR	·	990 m	MPC · JPL
264457	2000 YW_{120}	—	December 20, 2000	Socorro	LINEAR	615	1.8 km	MPC · JPL
264458	2001 AT_{32}	—	January 4, 2001	Socorro	LINEAR	·	2.9 km	MPC · JPL
264459	2001 CP_{34}	—	February 13, 2001	Socorro	LINEAR	PHO	1.0 km	MPC · JPL
264460	2001 CY_{37}	—	February 15, 2001	Socorro	LINEAR	H	630 m	MPC · JPL
264461	2001 CY_{48}	—	February 15, 2001	Socorro	LINEAR	·	3.5 km	MPC · JPL
264462	2001 DH_{7}	—	February 16, 2001	Oizumi	T. Kobayashi	·	2.4 km	MPC · JPL
264463	2001 DF_{42}	—	February 19, 2001	Socorro	LINEAR	·	1.1 km	MPC · JPL
264464	2001 DF_{55}	—	February 16, 2001	Kitt Peak	Spacewatch	·	730 m	MPC · JPL
264465	2001 DC_{96}	—	February 17, 2001	Socorro	LINEAR	·	1.5 km	MPC · JPL
264466	2001 DX_{103}	—	February 16, 2001	Anderson Mesa	LONEOS	·	2.4 km	MPC · JPL
264467	2001 FL_{58}	—	March 20, 2001	Haleakala	NEAT	·	1.1 km	MPC · JPL
264468	2001 FY_{85}	—	March 26, 2001	Cerro Tololo	Deep Lens Survey	·	1.6 km	MPC · JPL
264469	2001 FJ_{115}	—	March 19, 2001	Anderson Mesa	LONEOS	EOS	3.0 km	MPC · JPL
264470	2001 FL_{121}	—	March 23, 2001	Haleakala	NEAT	·	4.6 km	MPC · JPL
264471	2001 FR_{140}	—	March 22, 2001	Kitt Peak	Spacewatch	·	690 m	MPC · JPL
264472	2001 FL_{179}	—	March 20, 2001	Anderson Mesa	LONEOS	·	3.4 km	MPC · JPL
264473	2001 FU_{202}	—	March 21, 2001	Kitt Peak	SKADS	·	2.2 km	MPC · JPL
264474 Rogerclark	2001 FH_{212}	Rogerclark	March 21, 2001	Kitt Peak	SKADS	·	2.6 km	MPC · JPL
264475	2001 GV_{5}	—	April 13, 2001	Kitt Peak	Spacewatch	·	900 m	MPC · JPL
264476 Aepic	2001 HP	Aepic	April 16, 2001	St. Véran	St. Veran	NYS	800 m	MPC · JPL
264477	2001 KH_{16}	—	May 18, 2001	Socorro	LINEAR	·	5.2 km	MPC · JPL
264478	2001 KB_{19}	—	May 17, 2001	Socorro	LINEAR	·	4.0 km	MPC · JPL
264479	2001 MK_{21}	—	June 27, 2001	Palomar	NEAT	·	1.4 km	MPC · JPL
264480	2001 ND_{14}	—	July 14, 2001	Palomar	NEAT	·	1.3 km	MPC · JPL
264481	2001 OU_{15}	—	July 18, 2001	Palomar	NEAT	·	1.6 km	MPC · JPL
264482	2001 OZ_{30}	—	July 19, 2001	Palomar	NEAT	·	1.7 km	MPC · JPL
264483	2001 OZ_{37}	—	July 20, 2001	Palomar	NEAT	·	1.8 km	MPC · JPL
264484	2001 OE_{40}	—	July 20, 2001	Palomar	NEAT	PHO	1.7 km	MPC · JPL
264485	2001 OW_{49}	—	July 17, 2001	Palomar	NEAT	·	1.7 km	MPC · JPL
264486	2001 OK_{83}	—	July 27, 2001	Palomar	NEAT	·	5.7 km	MPC · JPL
264487	2001 OA_{101}	—	July 27, 2001	Palomar	NEAT	·	2.6 km	MPC · JPL
264488	2001 PE	—	August 1, 2001	Palomar	NEAT	H	890 m	MPC · JPL
264489	2001 PH_{31}	—	August 10, 2001	Palomar	NEAT	PHO	2.0 km	MPC · JPL
264490	2001 PV_{32}	—	August 10, 2001	Palomar	NEAT	H	750 m	MPC · JPL
264491	2001 PL_{44}	—	August 15, 2001	Haleakala	NEAT	·	1.6 km	MPC · JPL
264492	2001 PZ_{48}	—	August 14, 2001	Palomar	NEAT	EUN	1.6 km	MPC · JPL
264493	2001 PS_{50}	—	August 15, 2001	Ondřejov	Ondrejov	·	1.3 km	MPC · JPL
264494	2001 QU_{1}	—	August 16, 2001	Socorro	LINEAR	(5)	1.4 km	MPC · JPL
264495	2001 QB_{10}	—	August 16, 2001	Socorro	LINEAR	·	1.6 km	MPC · JPL
264496	2001 QQ_{33}	—	August 16, 2001	Socorro	LINEAR	H	870 m	MPC · JPL
264497	2001 QO_{36}	—	August 16, 2001	Socorro	LINEAR	(5)	1.7 km	MPC · JPL
264498	2001 QZ_{42}	—	August 16, 2001	Socorro	LINEAR	·	1.5 km	MPC · JPL
264499	2001 QX_{54}	—	August 16, 2001	Socorro	LINEAR	(5)	1.4 km	MPC · JPL
264500	2001 QB_{62}	—	August 16, 2001	Socorro	LINEAR	·	1.9 km	MPC · JPL

== 264501–264600 ==
back to top

Designation			Discovery			Properties		Ref
Permanent	Provisional	Named after	Date	Site	Discoverer(s)	Category	Diam.	Ref
264501	2001 QG_{91}	—	August 22, 2001	Socorro	LINEAR	H	870 m	MPC · JPL
264502	2001 QT_{118}	—	August 17, 2001	Socorro	LINEAR	BAR	1.5 km	MPC · JPL
264503	2001 QG_{135}	—	August 22, 2001	Socorro	LINEAR	·	1.9 km	MPC · JPL
264504	2001 QK_{135}	—	August 22, 2001	Socorro	LINEAR	H	850 m	MPC · JPL
264505	2001 QC_{155}	—	August 23, 2001	Anderson Mesa	LONEOS	·	1.3 km	MPC · JPL
264506	2001 QQ_{163}	—	August 31, 2001	Desert Eagle	W. K. Y. Yeung	(5)	1.9 km	MPC · JPL
264507	2001 QR_{172}	—	August 25, 2001	Socorro	LINEAR	·	1.1 km	MPC · JPL
264508	2001 QV_{176}	—	August 26, 2001	Kitt Peak	Spacewatch	·	1.1 km	MPC · JPL
264509	2001 QU_{211}	—	August 23, 2001	Anderson Mesa	LONEOS	·	1.6 km	MPC · JPL
264510	2001 QH_{216}	—	August 23, 2001	Anderson Mesa	LONEOS	·	2.0 km	MPC · JPL
264511	2001 QU_{217}	—	August 23, 2001	Anderson Mesa	LONEOS	·	1.7 km	MPC · JPL
264512	2001 QM_{218}	—	August 23, 2001	Anderson Mesa	LONEOS	·	1.9 km	MPC · JPL
264513	2001 QT_{227}	—	August 24, 2001	Anderson Mesa	LONEOS	·	1.4 km	MPC · JPL
264514	2001 QL_{249}	—	August 24, 2001	Socorro	LINEAR	(5)	1.8 km	MPC · JPL
264515	2001 QS_{252}	—	August 25, 2001	Socorro	LINEAR	EUN	1.4 km	MPC · JPL
264516	2001 QO_{254}	—	August 25, 2001	Anderson Mesa	LONEOS	·	2.0 km	MPC · JPL
264517	2001 QL_{268}	—	August 20, 2001	Palomar	NEAT	BAR	1.4 km	MPC · JPL
264518	2001 QY_{272}	—	August 19, 2001	Socorro	LINEAR	·	1.7 km	MPC · JPL
264519	2001 QY_{281}	—	August 19, 2001	Socorro	LINEAR	·	1.8 km	MPC · JPL
264520	2001 RG_{10}	—	September 10, 2001	Socorro	LINEAR	H	680 m	MPC · JPL
264521	2001 RB_{13}	—	September 9, 2001	Socorro	LINEAR	(5)	1.2 km	MPC · JPL
264522	2001 RP_{14}	—	September 10, 2001	Socorro	LINEAR	·	1.5 km	MPC · JPL
264523	2001 RX_{40}	—	September 11, 2001	Socorro	LINEAR	EUN	1.9 km	MPC · JPL
264524	2001 RC_{52}	—	September 12, 2001	Socorro	LINEAR	·	1.3 km	MPC · JPL
264525	2001 RA_{60}	—	September 12, 2001	Socorro	LINEAR	(5)	1.4 km	MPC · JPL
264526	2001 RG_{61}	—	September 12, 2001	Socorro	LINEAR	(5)	1.5 km	MPC · JPL
264527	2001 RX_{79}	—	September 12, 2001	Socorro	LINEAR	·	2.1 km	MPC · JPL
264528	2001 RG_{96}	—	September 12, 2001	Kitt Peak	Spacewatch	·	1.8 km	MPC · JPL
264529	2001 RP_{111}	—	September 12, 2001	Socorro	LINEAR	·	1.6 km	MPC · JPL
264530	2001 RV_{112}	—	September 12, 2001	Socorro	LINEAR	MAS	1 km	MPC · JPL
264531	2001 RH_{117}	—	September 12, 2001	Socorro	LINEAR	·	1.0 km	MPC · JPL
264532	2001 RR_{137}	—	September 12, 2001	Socorro	LINEAR	·	2.0 km	MPC · JPL
264533	2001 RO_{138}	—	September 12, 2001	Socorro	LINEAR	·	1.2 km	MPC · JPL
264534	2001 RM_{154}	—	September 11, 2001	Anderson Mesa	LONEOS	EUN	1.4 km	MPC · JPL
264535	2001 RR_{155}	—	September 10, 2001	Socorro	LINEAR	EUN	1.5 km	MPC · JPL
264536	2001 SR	—	September 17, 2001	Goodricke-Pigott	R. A. Tucker	MAR	1.7 km	MPC · JPL
264537	2001 SW_{3}	—	September 16, 2001	Socorro	LINEAR	(5)	1.4 km	MPC · JPL
264538	2001 SS_{8}	—	September 18, 2001	Kitt Peak	Spacewatch	·	1.9 km	MPC · JPL
264539	2001 SR_{12}	—	September 16, 2001	Socorro	LINEAR	·	1.1 km	MPC · JPL
264540	2001 SJ_{34}	—	September 16, 2001	Socorro	LINEAR	KON	3.1 km	MPC · JPL
264541	2001 SK_{35}	—	September 16, 2001	Socorro	LINEAR	·	1.4 km	MPC · JPL
264542	2001 SE_{58}	—	September 17, 2001	Socorro	LINEAR	·	1.3 km	MPC · JPL
264543	2001 SR_{72}	—	September 17, 2001	Socorro	LINEAR	·	2.3 km	MPC · JPL
264544	2001 SR_{119}	—	September 16, 2001	Socorro	LINEAR	·	2.1 km	MPC · JPL
264545	2001 SQ_{123}	—	September 16, 2001	Socorro	LINEAR	(5)	1.2 km	MPC · JPL
264546	2001 SA_{168}	—	September 19, 2001	Socorro	LINEAR	(12739)	1.9 km	MPC · JPL
264547	2001 SX_{174}	—	September 16, 2001	Socorro	LINEAR	·	1.6 km	MPC · JPL
264548	2001 SR_{178}	—	September 17, 2001	Socorro	LINEAR	·	1.8 km	MPC · JPL
264549	2001 SP_{204}	—	September 19, 2001	Socorro	LINEAR	·	1.5 km	MPC · JPL
264550	2001 SR_{224}	—	September 19, 2001	Socorro	LINEAR	(5)	1.2 km	MPC · JPL
264551	2001 SV_{224}	—	September 19, 2001	Socorro	LINEAR	·	1.5 km	MPC · JPL
264552	2001 SL_{229}	—	September 19, 2001	Socorro	LINEAR	·	1.5 km	MPC · JPL
264553	2001 SM_{237}	—	September 19, 2001	Socorro	LINEAR	·	1.2 km	MPC · JPL
264554	2001 SR_{254}	—	September 19, 2001	Socorro	LINEAR	(5)	1.5 km	MPC · JPL
264555	2001 SR_{258}	—	September 20, 2001	Socorro	LINEAR	·	2.0 km	MPC · JPL
264556	2001 SG_{268}	—	September 25, 2001	Desert Eagle	W. K. Y. Yeung	·	1.6 km	MPC · JPL
264557	2001 SU_{298}	—	September 20, 2001	Socorro	LINEAR	·	1.1 km	MPC · JPL
264558	2001 SM_{305}	—	September 20, 2001	Socorro	LINEAR	·	2.0 km	MPC · JPL
264559	2001 SV_{308}	—	September 22, 2001	Socorro	LINEAR	·	1.8 km	MPC · JPL
264560	2001 SP_{315}	—	September 25, 2001	Socorro	LINEAR	·	2.5 km	MPC · JPL
264561	2001 SV_{354}	—	September 25, 2001	Palomar	NEAT	·	2.8 km	MPC · JPL
264562	2001 TH_{2}	—	October 6, 2001	Palomar	NEAT	·	1.3 km	MPC · JPL
264563	2001 TN_{10}	—	October 13, 2001	Socorro	LINEAR	·	1.5 km	MPC · JPL
264564	2001 TS_{21}	—	October 11, 2001	Socorro	LINEAR	·	2.4 km	MPC · JPL
264565	2001 TR_{29}	—	October 14, 2001	Socorro	LINEAR	·	1.7 km	MPC · JPL
264566	2001 TG_{32}	—	October 14, 2001	Socorro	LINEAR	·	1.7 km	MPC · JPL
264567	2001 TM_{33}	—	October 14, 2001	Socorro	LINEAR	·	1.7 km	MPC · JPL
264568	2001 TK_{37}	—	October 14, 2001	Socorro	LINEAR	·	2.7 km	MPC · JPL
264569	2001 TZ_{65}	—	October 13, 2001	Socorro	LINEAR	·	1.6 km	MPC · JPL
264570	2001 TV_{70}	—	October 13, 2001	Socorro	LINEAR	·	2.0 km	MPC · JPL
264571	2001 TY_{72}	—	October 13, 2001	Socorro	LINEAR	·	1.8 km	MPC · JPL
264572	2001 TD_{73}	—	October 13, 2001	Socorro	LINEAR	·	1.5 km	MPC · JPL
264573	2001 TG_{92}	—	October 14, 2001	Socorro	LINEAR	·	1.3 km	MPC · JPL
264574	2001 TK_{93}	—	October 14, 2001	Socorro	LINEAR	·	2.2 km	MPC · JPL
264575	2001 TE_{104}	—	October 15, 2001	Desert Eagle	W. K. Y. Yeung	·	1.7 km	MPC · JPL
264576	2001 TV_{118}	—	October 15, 2001	Socorro	LINEAR	EUN	1.8 km	MPC · JPL
264577	2001 TA_{120}	—	October 15, 2001	Socorro	LINEAR	·	1.6 km	MPC · JPL
264578	2001 TX_{120}	—	October 15, 2001	Socorro	LINEAR	·	2.2 km	MPC · JPL
264579	2001 TU_{123}	—	October 12, 2001	Haleakala	NEAT	·	1.7 km	MPC · JPL
264580	2001 TQ_{133}	—	October 12, 2001	Haleakala	NEAT	EUN	1.7 km	MPC · JPL
264581	2001 TV_{159}	—	October 13, 2001	Palomar	NEAT	·	3.7 km	MPC · JPL
264582	2001 TY_{159}	—	October 13, 2001	Palomar	NEAT	·	7.0 km	MPC · JPL
264583	2001 TK_{161}	—	October 11, 2001	Palomar	NEAT	(5)	1.4 km	MPC · JPL
264584	2001 TD_{164}	—	October 11, 2001	Palomar	NEAT	(5)	1.4 km	MPC · JPL
264585	2001 TR_{167}	—	October 15, 2001	Socorro	LINEAR	·	1.9 km	MPC · JPL
264586	2001 TV_{180}	—	October 14, 2001	Socorro	LINEAR	·	1.3 km	MPC · JPL
264587	2001 TF_{189}	—	October 14, 2001	Socorro	LINEAR	·	2.2 km	MPC · JPL
264588	2001 TY_{190}	—	October 14, 2001	Socorro	LINEAR	·	1.7 km	MPC · JPL
264589	2001 TZ_{195}	—	October 12, 2001	Haleakala	NEAT	·	1.8 km	MPC · JPL
264590	2001 TR_{212}	—	October 13, 2001	Anderson Mesa	LONEOS	·	2.0 km	MPC · JPL
264591	2001 TE_{214}	—	October 13, 2001	Anderson Mesa	LONEOS	·	1.5 km	MPC · JPL
264592	2001 TL_{233}	—	October 15, 2001	Palomar	NEAT	·	2.2 km	MPC · JPL
264593	2001 TW_{236}	—	October 8, 2001	Palomar	NEAT	·	1.9 km	MPC · JPL
264594	2001 UM_{1}	—	October 19, 2001	Emerald Lane	L. Ball	·	1.2 km	MPC · JPL
264595	2001 UX_{13}	—	October 24, 2001	Desert Eagle	W. K. Y. Yeung	T_{j} (2.99) · 3:2	6.4 km	MPC · JPL
264596	2001 UV_{27}	—	October 16, 2001	Socorro	LINEAR	·	1.8 km	MPC · JPL
264597	2001 UY_{28}	—	October 16, 2001	Socorro	LINEAR	·	1.5 km	MPC · JPL
264598	2001 UD_{60}	—	October 17, 2001	Socorro	LINEAR	·	2.1 km	MPC · JPL
264599	2001 US_{60}	—	October 17, 2001	Socorro	LINEAR	·	1.2 km	MPC · JPL
264600	2001 UZ_{61}	—	October 17, 2001	Socorro	LINEAR	·	1.4 km	MPC · JPL

== 264601–264700 ==
back to top

Designation			Discovery			Properties		Ref
Permanent	Provisional	Named after	Date	Site	Discoverer(s)	Category	Diam.	Ref
264601	2001 UG_{65}	—	October 18, 2001	Socorro	LINEAR	EUN	1.9 km	MPC · JPL
264602	2001 UF_{75}	—	October 17, 2001	Socorro	LINEAR	·	1.6 km	MPC · JPL
264603	2001 UD_{86}	—	October 16, 2001	Kitt Peak	Spacewatch	·	1.3 km	MPC · JPL
264604	2001 UZ_{92}	—	October 19, 2001	Palomar	NEAT	·	1.7 km	MPC · JPL
264605	2001 UB_{110}	—	October 21, 2001	Socorro	LINEAR	(5)	1.3 km	MPC · JPL
264606	2001 UV_{134}	—	October 21, 2001	Socorro	LINEAR	·	2.0 km	MPC · JPL
264607	2001 UE_{136}	—	October 22, 2001	Socorro	LINEAR	·	1.6 km	MPC · JPL
264608	2001 UO_{144}	—	October 23, 2001	Socorro	LINEAR	(5)	1.5 km	MPC · JPL
264609	2001 UA_{177}	—	October 21, 2001	Socorro	LINEAR	(5)	1.6 km	MPC · JPL
264610	2001 UP_{178}	—	October 23, 2001	Palomar	NEAT	·	2.6 km	MPC · JPL
264611	2001 UJ_{190}	—	October 18, 2001	Palomar	NEAT	·	1.5 km	MPC · JPL
264612	2001 UR_{195}	—	October 18, 2001	Palomar	NEAT	·	1.3 km	MPC · JPL
264613	2001 UL_{196}	—	October 18, 2001	Palomar	NEAT	·	1.7 km	MPC · JPL
264614	2001 UY_{200}	—	October 19, 2001	Palomar	NEAT	(5)	1.3 km	MPC · JPL
264615	2001 UP_{202}	—	October 19, 2001	Kitt Peak	Spacewatch	·	1.3 km	MPC · JPL
264616	2001 UN_{204}	—	October 19, 2001	Palomar	NEAT	·	1.6 km	MPC · JPL
264617	2001 UJ_{220}	—	October 21, 2001	Socorro	LINEAR	·	1.4 km	MPC · JPL
264618	2001 US_{220}	—	October 21, 2001	Socorro	LINEAR	(5)	1.3 km	MPC · JPL
264619	2001 VL_{28}	—	November 9, 2001	Socorro	LINEAR	·	2.4 km	MPC · JPL
264620	2001 VZ_{37}	—	November 9, 2001	Socorro	LINEAR	MIS	2.5 km	MPC · JPL
264621	2001 VM_{38}	—	November 9, 2001	Socorro	LINEAR	MIS	2.6 km	MPC · JPL
264622	2001 VG_{53}	—	November 10, 2001	Socorro	LINEAR	(5)	1.8 km	MPC · JPL
264623	2001 VT_{64}	—	November 10, 2001	Socorro	LINEAR	·	2.5 km	MPC · JPL
264624	2001 VS_{88}	—	November 12, 2001	Anderson Mesa	LONEOS	EUN	1.5 km	MPC · JPL
264625	2001 VN_{93}	—	November 15, 2001	Socorro	LINEAR	·	2.1 km	MPC · JPL
264626	2001 VA_{97}	—	November 15, 2001	Socorro	LINEAR	slow	2.1 km	MPC · JPL
264627	2001 VR_{132}	—	November 12, 2001	Apache Point	SDSS	·	1.9 km	MPC · JPL
264628	2001 WZ_{35}	—	November 17, 2001	Socorro	LINEAR	·	1.7 km	MPC · JPL
264629	2001 WV_{36}	—	November 17, 2001	Socorro	LINEAR	·	2.9 km	MPC · JPL
264630	2001 WD_{37}	—	November 17, 2001	Socorro	LINEAR	HNS	1.8 km	MPC · JPL
264631	2001 WG_{44}	—	November 18, 2001	Socorro	LINEAR	·	1.2 km	MPC · JPL
264632	2001 WZ_{48}	—	November 18, 2001	Kitt Peak	Spacewatch	·	1.4 km	MPC · JPL
264633	2001 WE_{53}	—	November 19, 2001	Socorro	LINEAR	MIS	2.5 km	MPC · JPL
264634	2001 WS_{54}	—	November 19, 2001	Socorro	LINEAR	·	1.7 km	MPC · JPL
264635	2001 WD_{55}	—	November 19, 2001	Socorro	LINEAR	·	1.2 km	MPC · JPL
264636	2001 WZ_{57}	—	November 19, 2001	Socorro	LINEAR	·	1.3 km	MPC · JPL
264637	2001 WD_{63}	—	November 19, 2001	Socorro	LINEAR	·	1.6 km	MPC · JPL
264638	2001 WC_{69}	—	November 20, 2001	Socorro	LINEAR	·	2.1 km	MPC · JPL
264639	2001 WB_{73}	—	November 20, 2001	Socorro	LINEAR	·	3.1 km	MPC · JPL
264640	2001 WE_{76}	—	November 20, 2001	Socorro	LINEAR	·	1.4 km	MPC · JPL
264641	2001 WQ_{82}	—	November 20, 2001	Socorro	LINEAR	·	1.4 km	MPC · JPL
264642	2001 WS_{85}	—	November 20, 2001	Socorro	LINEAR	·	1.6 km	MPC · JPL
264643	2001 WL_{101}	—	November 17, 2001	Kitt Peak	Spacewatch	·	1.3 km	MPC · JPL
264644	2001 XU_{3}	—	December 9, 2001	Socorro	LINEAR	·	2.6 km	MPC · JPL
264645	2001 XV_{30}	—	December 7, 2001	Cima Ekar	ADAS	MAR	1.3 km	MPC · JPL
264646	2001 XB_{31}	—	December 14, 2001	Kitt Peak	Spacewatch	·	2.5 km	MPC · JPL
264647	2001 XV_{35}	—	December 9, 2001	Socorro	LINEAR	·	2.1 km	MPC · JPL
264648	2001 XU_{44}	—	December 9, 2001	Socorro	LINEAR	EUN	1.8 km	MPC · JPL
264649	2001 XH_{45}	—	December 9, 2001	Socorro	LINEAR	·	2.4 km	MPC · JPL
264650	2001 XJ_{46}	—	December 9, 2001	Socorro	LINEAR	·	2.3 km	MPC · JPL
264651	2001 XO_{50}	—	December 10, 2001	Socorro	LINEAR	MAR	1.4 km	MPC · JPL
264652	2001 XR_{55}	—	December 11, 2001	Socorro	LINEAR	·	1.9 km	MPC · JPL
264653	2001 XE_{60}	—	December 10, 2001	Socorro	LINEAR	·	2.8 km	MPC · JPL
264654	2001 XJ_{87}	—	December 13, 2001	Socorro	LINEAR	·	1.8 km	MPC · JPL
264655	2001 XV_{93}	—	December 10, 2001	Socorro	LINEAR	·	2.4 km	MPC · JPL
264656	2001 XO_{97}	—	December 10, 2001	Socorro	LINEAR	slow	2.4 km	MPC · JPL
264657	2001 XH_{98}	—	December 10, 2001	Socorro	LINEAR	·	2.7 km	MPC · JPL
264658	2001 XJ_{106}	—	December 10, 2001	Socorro	LINEAR	·	2.2 km	MPC · JPL
264659	2001 XY_{106}	—	December 10, 2001	Socorro	LINEAR	·	3.2 km	MPC · JPL
264660	2001 XC_{110}	—	December 11, 2001	Socorro	LINEAR	·	2.0 km	MPC · JPL
264661	2001 XX_{110}	—	December 11, 2001	Socorro	LINEAR	·	1.5 km	MPC · JPL
264662	2001 XS_{116}	—	December 13, 2001	Socorro	LINEAR	·	2.2 km	MPC · JPL
264663	2001 XJ_{124}	—	December 14, 2001	Socorro	LINEAR	·	3.0 km	MPC · JPL
264664	2001 XQ_{130}	—	December 14, 2001	Socorro	LINEAR	·	4.6 km	MPC · JPL
264665	2001 XE_{133}	—	December 14, 2001	Socorro	LINEAR	·	2.2 km	MPC · JPL
264666	2001 XO_{135}	—	December 14, 2001	Socorro	LINEAR	·	1.8 km	MPC · JPL
264667	2001 XL_{147}	—	December 14, 2001	Socorro	LINEAR	·	2.1 km	MPC · JPL
264668	2001 XD_{161}	—	December 14, 2001	Socorro	LINEAR	·	1.8 km	MPC · JPL
264669	2001 XU_{199}	—	December 14, 2001	Socorro	LINEAR	·	2.1 km	MPC · JPL
264670	2001 XS_{216}	—	December 14, 2001	Socorro	LINEAR	·	2.7 km	MPC · JPL
264671	2001 XU_{221}	—	December 15, 2001	Socorro	LINEAR	·	2.0 km	MPC · JPL
264672	2001 XN_{222}	—	December 15, 2001	Socorro	LINEAR	·	1.7 km	MPC · JPL
264673	2001 XX_{222}	—	December 15, 2001	Socorro	LINEAR	·	1.6 km	MPC · JPL
264674	2001 XB_{224}	—	December 15, 2001	Socorro	LINEAR	·	2.3 km	MPC · JPL
264675	2001 XL_{226}	—	December 15, 2001	Socorro	LINEAR	·	1.9 km	MPC · JPL
264676	2001 XG_{256}	—	December 5, 2001	Haleakala	NEAT	·	1.4 km	MPC · JPL
264677	2001 YZ_{4}	—	December 23, 2001	Kingsnake	J. V. McClusky	·	2.4 km	MPC · JPL
264678	2001 YG_{34}	—	December 18, 2001	Socorro	LINEAR	·	2.3 km	MPC · JPL
264679	2001 YY_{63}	—	December 18, 2001	Socorro	LINEAR	·	2.1 km	MPC · JPL
264680	2001 YW_{105}	—	December 17, 2001	Socorro	LINEAR	·	1.7 km	MPC · JPL
264681	2001 YY_{111}	—	December 18, 2001	Anderson Mesa	LONEOS	EUN	1.6 km	MPC · JPL
264682	2001 YL_{119}	—	December 19, 2001	Socorro	LINEAR	·	2.1 km	MPC · JPL
264683	2001 YH_{128}	—	December 17, 2001	Socorro	LINEAR	·	2.6 km	MPC · JPL
264684	2001 YJ_{129}	—	December 17, 2001	Socorro	LINEAR	·	2.9 km	MPC · JPL
264685	2001 YH_{136}	—	December 22, 2001	Socorro	LINEAR	HNS	1.8 km	MPC · JPL
264686	2001 YR_{136}	—	December 22, 2001	Socorro	LINEAR	·	2.5 km	MPC · JPL
264687	2001 YE_{138}	—	December 20, 2001	Palomar	NEAT	·	2.5 km	MPC · JPL
264688	2002 AB_{8}	—	January 6, 2002	Kitt Peak	Spacewatch	MRX	1.1 km	MPC · JPL
264689	2002 AV_{13}	—	January 12, 2002	Desert Eagle	W. K. Y. Yeung	·	2.4 km	MPC · JPL
264690	2002 AC_{35}	—	January 7, 2002	Socorro	LINEAR	JUN	1.5 km	MPC · JPL
264691	2002 AZ_{36}	—	January 9, 2002	Socorro	LINEAR	EUN	1.8 km	MPC · JPL
264692	2002 AU_{41}	—	January 9, 2002	Socorro	LINEAR	LEO	2.3 km	MPC · JPL
264693	2002 AN_{56}	—	January 9, 2002	Socorro	LINEAR	WIT	1.4 km	MPC · JPL
264694	2002 AS_{60}	—	January 9, 2002	Socorro	LINEAR	·	2.2 km	MPC · JPL
264695	2002 AS_{65}	—	January 12, 2002	Socorro	LINEAR	·	1.8 km	MPC · JPL
264696	2002 AD_{96}	—	January 8, 2002	Socorro	LINEAR	·	2.7 km	MPC · JPL
264697	2002 AV_{100}	—	January 8, 2002	Socorro	LINEAR	·	2.3 km	MPC · JPL
264698	2002 AF_{105}	—	January 9, 2002	Socorro	LINEAR	·	2.8 km	MPC · JPL
264699	2002 AG_{110}	—	January 9, 2002	Socorro	LINEAR	·	2.6 km	MPC · JPL
264700	2002 AB_{120}	—	January 9, 2002	Socorro	LINEAR	·	2.7 km	MPC · JPL

== 264701–264800 ==
back to top

Designation			Discovery			Properties		Ref
Permanent	Provisional	Named after	Date	Site	Discoverer(s)	Category	Diam.	Ref
264701	2002 AG_{120}	—	January 9, 2002	Socorro	LINEAR	·	2.6 km	MPC · JPL
264702	2002 AK_{126}	—	January 13, 2002	Socorro	LINEAR	·	2.4 km	MPC · JPL
264703	2002 AF_{130}	—	January 15, 2002	Socorro	LINEAR	NEM	3.2 km	MPC · JPL
264704	2002 AA_{133}	—	January 8, 2002	Socorro	LINEAR	·	2.4 km	MPC · JPL
264705	2002 AK_{135}	—	January 9, 2002	Socorro	LINEAR	·	1.8 km	MPC · JPL
264706	2002 AC_{189}	—	January 10, 2002	Palomar	NEAT	·	2.5 km	MPC · JPL
264707	2002 AR_{194}	—	January 13, 2002	Kitt Peak	Spacewatch	·	2.2 km	MPC · JPL
264708	2002 AQ_{196}	—	January 13, 2002	Kitt Peak	Spacewatch	(12739)	2.0 km	MPC · JPL
264709	2002 AS_{196}	—	January 13, 2002	Socorro	LINEAR	·	2.1 km	MPC · JPL
264710	2002 AT_{196}	—	January 13, 2002	Kitt Peak	Spacewatch	·	2.4 km	MPC · JPL
264711	2002 AQ_{203}	—	January 10, 2002	Cima Ekar	ADAS	·	2.2 km	MPC · JPL
264712	2002 BR_{2}	—	January 20, 2002	Kitt Peak	Spacewatch	·	2.0 km	MPC · JPL
264713	2002 BF_{5}	—	January 19, 2002	Anderson Mesa	LONEOS	·	3.6 km	MPC · JPL
264714	2002 BJ_{5}	—	January 19, 2002	Anderson Mesa	LONEOS	·	2.8 km	MPC · JPL
264715	2002 BL_{27}	—	January 20, 2002	Anderson Mesa	LONEOS	·	2.6 km	MPC · JPL
264716	2002 BW_{29}	—	January 21, 2002	Anderson Mesa	LONEOS	·	2.4 km	MPC · JPL
264717	2002 CJ	—	February 2, 2002	Palomar	NEAT	EUN	1.7 km	MPC · JPL
264718	2002 CO_{18}	—	February 6, 2002	Socorro	LINEAR	·	3.9 km	MPC · JPL
264719	2002 CO_{19}	—	February 4, 2002	Palomar	NEAT	·	2.5 km	MPC · JPL
264720	2002 CR_{63}	—	February 6, 2002	Socorro	LINEAR	CLO	3.4 km	MPC · JPL
264721	2002 CX_{74}	—	February 7, 2002	Socorro	LINEAR	WIT	1.5 km	MPC · JPL
264722	2002 CB_{75}	—	February 7, 2002	Socorro	LINEAR	EUN	2.0 km	MPC · JPL
264723	2002 CB_{76}	—	February 7, 2002	Socorro	LINEAR	·	2.7 km	MPC · JPL
264724	2002 CJ_{76}	—	February 7, 2002	Socorro	LINEAR	·	1.8 km	MPC · JPL
264725	2002 CR_{76}	—	February 7, 2002	Socorro	LINEAR	HOF	4.0 km	MPC · JPL
264726	2002 CE_{79}	—	February 7, 2002	Socorro	LINEAR	AGN	1.6 km	MPC · JPL
264727	2002 CM_{79}	—	February 7, 2002	Socorro	LINEAR	(13314)	2.4 km	MPC · JPL
264728	2002 CG_{84}	—	February 7, 2002	Socorro	LINEAR	·	2.7 km	MPC · JPL
264729	2002 CZ_{89}	—	February 7, 2002	Socorro	LINEAR	·	3.4 km	MPC · JPL
264730	2002 CU_{91}	—	February 7, 2002	Socorro	LINEAR	·	2.4 km	MPC · JPL
264731	2002 CF_{92}	—	February 7, 2002	Socorro	LINEAR	·	3.0 km	MPC · JPL
264732	2002 CB_{104}	—	February 7, 2002	Socorro	LINEAR	·	3.8 km	MPC · JPL
264733	2002 CE_{113}	—	February 8, 2002	Socorro	LINEAR	·	3.9 km	MPC · JPL
264734	2002 CX_{114}	—	February 8, 2002	Socorro	LINEAR	GEF	2.0 km	MPC · JPL
264735	2002 CY_{160}	—	February 8, 2002	Socorro	LINEAR	·	2.8 km	MPC · JPL
264736	2002 CM_{165}	—	February 8, 2002	Socorro	LINEAR	·	3.2 km	MPC · JPL
264737	2002 CG_{168}	—	February 8, 2002	Socorro	LINEAR	·	3.0 km	MPC · JPL
264738	2002 CU_{170}	—	February 8, 2002	Socorro	LINEAR	·	2.9 km	MPC · JPL
264739	2002 CN_{176}	—	February 10, 2002	Socorro	LINEAR	·	2.8 km	MPC · JPL
264740	2002 CV_{181}	—	February 10, 2002	Socorro	LINEAR	·	2.1 km	MPC · JPL
264741	2002 CJ_{192}	—	February 10, 2002	Socorro	LINEAR	·	2.7 km	MPC · JPL
264742	2002 CU_{192}	—	February 10, 2002	Socorro	LINEAR	·	1.9 km	MPC · JPL
264743	2002 CV_{202}	—	February 10, 2002	Socorro	LINEAR	·	3.2 km	MPC · JPL
264744	2002 CJ_{206}	—	February 10, 2002	Socorro	LINEAR	MRX	1.3 km	MPC · JPL
264745	2002 CD_{207}	—	February 10, 2002	Socorro	LINEAR	·	2.6 km	MPC · JPL
264746	2002 CP_{209}	—	February 10, 2002	Socorro	LINEAR	·	2.4 km	MPC · JPL
264747	2002 CC_{210}	—	February 10, 2002	Socorro	LINEAR	·	1.7 km	MPC · JPL
264748	2002 CV_{234}	—	February 8, 2002	Kitt Peak	Spacewatch	·	2.6 km	MPC · JPL
264749	2002 CA_{245}	—	February 13, 2002	Socorro	LINEAR	·	5.1 km	MPC · JPL
264750	2002 CD_{276}	—	February 9, 2002	Palomar	NEAT	·	4.8 km	MPC · JPL
264751	2002 CA_{310}	—	February 6, 2002	Palomar	NEAT	AEO	1.2 km	MPC · JPL
264752	2002 DJ_{7}	—	February 19, 2002	Socorro	LINEAR	JUN	1.6 km	MPC · JPL
264753	2002 DA_{9}	—	February 19, 2002	Socorro	LINEAR	·	2.1 km	MPC · JPL
264754	2002 DU_{9}	—	February 19, 2002	Socorro	LINEAR	·	2.7 km	MPC · JPL
264755	2002 DD_{10}	—	February 20, 2002	Socorro	LINEAR	·	3.1 km	MPC · JPL
264756	2002 DU_{14}	—	February 16, 2002	Palomar	NEAT	·	3.6 km	MPC · JPL
264757	2002 EM_{3}	—	March 7, 2002	Cima Ekar	ADAS	(13314)	2.7 km	MPC · JPL
264758	2002 EH_{27}	—	March 9, 2002	Socorro	LINEAR	·	1.1 km	MPC · JPL
264759	2002 EY_{37}	—	March 10, 2002	Kitt Peak	Spacewatch	·	2.3 km	MPC · JPL
264760	2002 ES_{51}	—	March 9, 2002	Socorro	LINEAR	·	4.8 km	MPC · JPL
264761	2002 EY_{59}	—	March 13, 2002	Socorro	LINEAR	·	2.7 km	MPC · JPL
264762	2002 EB_{82}	—	March 13, 2002	Palomar	NEAT	HOF	3.5 km	MPC · JPL
264763	2002 EY_{107}	—	March 9, 2002	Palomar	NEAT	·	2.5 km	MPC · JPL
264764	2002 EY_{122}	—	March 12, 2002	Palomar	NEAT	·	2.4 km	MPC · JPL
264765	2002 ER_{147}	—	March 15, 2002	Palomar	NEAT	·	2.5 km	MPC · JPL
264766	2002 FK_{1}	—	March 19, 2002	Palomar	NEAT	·	3.3 km	MPC · JPL
264767	2002 FY_{13}	—	March 18, 2002	Kitt Peak	M. W. Buie	·	2.9 km	MPC · JPL
264768	2002 FB_{22}	—	March 19, 2002	Socorro	LINEAR	·	3.3 km	MPC · JPL
264769	2002 FN_{37}	—	March 31, 2002	Palomar	NEAT	EOS	3.0 km	MPC · JPL
264770	2002 FS_{40}	—	March 20, 2002	Palomar	NEAT	L4	10 km	MPC · JPL
264771	2002 GC_{10}	—	April 15, 2002	Kvistaberg	Uppsala-DLR Asteroid Survey	·	3.6 km	MPC · JPL
264772	2002 GS_{78}	—	April 9, 2002	Kvistaberg	Uppsala-DLR Asteroid Survey	·	3.1 km	MPC · JPL
264773	2002 GA_{113}	—	April 11, 2002	Anderson Mesa	LONEOS	·	1.3 km	MPC · JPL
264774	2002 GO_{131}	—	April 12, 2002	Socorro	LINEAR	·	870 m	MPC · JPL
264775	2002 GZ_{138}	—	April 13, 2002	Palomar	NEAT	·	2.7 km	MPC · JPL
264776	2002 GQ_{149}	—	April 14, 2002	Socorro	LINEAR	·	2.7 km	MPC · JPL
264777	2002 GD_{162}	—	April 14, 2002	Palomar	NEAT	·	3.3 km	MPC · JPL
264778	2002 JC_{1}	—	May 1, 2002	Palomar	NEAT	·	3.6 km	MPC · JPL
264779	2002 JN_{69}	—	May 7, 2002	Socorro	LINEAR	·	3.2 km	MPC · JPL
264780	2002 JA_{83}	—	May 11, 2002	Socorro	LINEAR	·	2.8 km	MPC · JPL
264781	2002 JQ_{85}	—	May 11, 2002	Socorro	LINEAR	·	1.2 km	MPC · JPL
264782	2002 JV_{144}	—	May 13, 2002	Palomar	NEAT	·	3.1 km	MPC · JPL
264783	2002 KC_{9}	—	May 29, 2002	Haleakala	NEAT	·	6.4 km	MPC · JPL
264784	2002 LG_{16}	—	June 6, 2002	Socorro	LINEAR	·	5.7 km	MPC · JPL
264785	2002 LW_{55}	—	June 14, 2002	Socorro	LINEAR	·	5.1 km	MPC · JPL
264786	2002 LZ_{58}	—	June 8, 2002	Haleakala	NEAT	·	5.2 km	MPC · JPL
264787	2002 MW_{1}	—	June 16, 2002	Palomar	NEAT	·	920 m	MPC · JPL
264788	2002 MG_{5}	—	June 18, 2002	Kitt Peak	Spacewatch	·	3.8 km	MPC · JPL
264789	2002 MG_{6}	—	June 16, 2002	Palomar	NEAT	EOS	2.4 km	MPC · JPL
264790	2002 NU_{8}	—	July 1, 2002	Palomar	NEAT	·	7.2 km	MPC · JPL
264791	2002 NG_{9}	—	July 2, 2002	Palomar	NEAT	·	1.0 km	MPC · JPL
264792	2002 NJ_{10}	—	July 4, 2002	Palomar	NEAT	(2076)	1.1 km	MPC · JPL
264793	2002 NP_{43}	—	July 15, 2002	Palomar	NEAT	·	920 m	MPC · JPL
264794	2002 NX_{49}	—	July 13, 2002	Haleakala	NEAT	·	1.3 km	MPC · JPL
264795	2002 NE_{57}	—	July 14, 2002	Palomar	S. F. Hönig	·	950 m	MPC · JPL
264796	2002 NF_{59}	—	July 4, 2002	Palomar	NEAT	·	7.2 km	MPC · JPL
264797	2002 NB_{65}	—	July 12, 2002	Palomar	NEAT	·	720 m	MPC · JPL
264798	2002 NQ_{67}	—	July 14, 2002	Palomar	NEAT	THM	2.7 km	MPC · JPL
264799	2002 OE_{6}	—	July 20, 2002	Palomar	NEAT	·	5.5 km	MPC · JPL
264800	2002 OH_{15}	—	July 18, 2002	Socorro	LINEAR	EOS	2.8 km	MPC · JPL

== 264801–264900 ==
back to top

Designation			Discovery			Properties		Ref
Permanent	Provisional	Named after	Date	Site	Discoverer(s)	Category	Diam.	Ref
264801	2002 OW_{29}	—	July 21, 2002	Palomar	NEAT	·	1.1 km	MPC · JPL
264802	2002 OQ_{33}	—	July 22, 2002	Palomar	NEAT	EOS	2.7 km	MPC · JPL
264803	2002 OX_{33}	—	July 22, 2002	Palomar	NEAT	·	810 m	MPC · JPL
264804	2002 PY_{1}	—	August 4, 2002	Reedy Creek	J. Broughton	TIR	5.0 km	MPC · JPL
264805	2002 PP_{4}	—	August 4, 2002	Palomar	NEAT	·	6.9 km	MPC · JPL
264806	2002 PP_{9}	—	August 5, 2002	Palomar	NEAT	·	850 m	MPC · JPL
264807	2002 PB_{27}	—	August 6, 2002	Palomar	NEAT	·	3.5 km	MPC · JPL
264808	2002 PY_{31}	—	August 6, 2002	Palomar	NEAT	·	1.4 km	MPC · JPL
264809	2002 PX_{45}	—	August 9, 2002	Socorro	LINEAR	·	1.8 km	MPC · JPL
264810	2002 PS_{59}	—	August 10, 2002	Socorro	LINEAR	·	1.3 km	MPC · JPL
264811	2002 PD_{81}	—	August 13, 2002	Palomar	NEAT	·	4.8 km	MPC · JPL
264812	2002 PW_{91}	—	August 14, 2002	Socorro	LINEAR	BAP	970 m	MPC · JPL
264813	2002 PS_{114}	—	August 14, 2002	Socorro	LINEAR	ERI	2.2 km	MPC · JPL
264814	2002 PT_{120}	—	August 13, 2002	Anderson Mesa	LONEOS	·	1.5 km	MPC · JPL
264815	2002 PM_{129}	—	August 15, 2002	Palomar	NEAT	·	840 m	MPC · JPL
264816	2002 PJ_{134}	—	August 14, 2002	Socorro	LINEAR	·	940 m	MPC · JPL
264817	2002 PL_{135}	—	August 14, 2002	Socorro	LINEAR	·	7.7 km	MPC · JPL
264818	2002 PX_{135}	—	August 14, 2002	Socorro	LINEAR	(2076)	1.0 km	MPC · JPL
264819	2002 PE_{137}	—	August 15, 2002	Palomar	NEAT	V	610 m	MPC · JPL
264820	2002 PF_{151}	—	August 6, 2002	Palomar	NEAT	·	1.5 km	MPC · JPL
264821	2002 PV_{153}	—	August 8, 2002	Palomar	NEAT	VER	4.7 km	MPC · JPL
264822	2002 PH_{156}	—	August 8, 2002	Palomar	S. F. Hönig	·	4.3 km	MPC · JPL
264823	2002 PF_{161}	—	August 8, 2002	Palomar	S. F. Hönig	·	2.7 km	MPC · JPL
264824	2002 PR_{161}	—	August 8, 2002	Palomar	S. F. Hönig	MAS	930 m	MPC · JPL
264825	2002 PC_{175}	—	August 11, 2002	Palomar	NEAT	·	840 m	MPC · JPL
264826	2002 PE_{177}	—	August 11, 2002	Palomar	NEAT	·	1.1 km	MPC · JPL
264827	2002 PV_{178}	—	August 15, 2002	Palomar	NEAT	·	6.2 km	MPC · JPL
264828	2002 PS_{187}	—	August 8, 2002	Palomar	NEAT	THM	2.4 km	MPC · JPL
264829	2002 QV	—	August 16, 2002	Kitt Peak	Spacewatch	·	4.2 km	MPC · JPL
264830	2002 QZ_{7}	—	August 19, 2002	Palomar	NEAT	·	1.3 km	MPC · JPL
264831	2002 QY_{11}	—	August 26, 2002	Palomar	NEAT	·	1.3 km	MPC · JPL
264832	2002 QR_{13}	—	August 26, 2002	Palomar	NEAT	·	990 m	MPC · JPL
264833	2002 QZ_{23}	—	August 28, 2002	Palomar	NEAT	·	5.5 km	MPC · JPL
264834	2002 QL_{31}	—	August 29, 2002	Palomar	NEAT	·	3.4 km	MPC · JPL
264835	2002 QD_{36}	—	August 29, 2002	Palomar	NEAT	·	1.3 km	MPC · JPL
264836	2002 QP_{48}	—	August 18, 2002	Palomar	S. F. Hönig	·	1.0 km	MPC · JPL
264837	2002 QF_{49}	—	August 27, 2002	Palomar	R. Matson	V	850 m	MPC · JPL
264838	2002 QB_{58}	—	August 28, 2002	Palomar	R. Matson	·	4.6 km	MPC · JPL
264839	2002 QY_{62}	—	August 18, 2002	Palomar	NEAT	·	1.5 km	MPC · JPL
264840	2002 QM_{70}	—	August 18, 2002	Palomar	NEAT	·	3.6 km	MPC · JPL
264841	2002 QO_{82}	—	August 16, 2002	Palomar	NEAT	·	1.0 km	MPC · JPL
264842	2002 QZ_{93}	—	August 17, 2002	Palomar	NEAT	·	1.4 km	MPC · JPL
264843	2002 QT_{97}	—	August 18, 2002	Palomar	NEAT	·	3.9 km	MPC · JPL
264844	2002 QW_{97}	—	August 18, 2002	Palomar	NEAT	·	4.8 km	MPC · JPL
264845	2002 QV_{106}	—	August 17, 2002	Palomar	NEAT	·	4.1 km	MPC · JPL
264846	2002 QW_{107}	—	August 27, 2002	Palomar	NEAT	·	4.3 km	MPC · JPL
264847	2002 QB_{110}	—	August 17, 2002	Palomar	NEAT	EOS	2.0 km	MPC · JPL
264848	2002 QE_{132}	—	August 16, 2002	Palomar	NEAT	·	4.3 km	MPC · JPL
264849	2002 RD_{10}	—	September 4, 2002	Palomar	NEAT	·	1.5 km	MPC · JPL
264850	2002 RP_{11}	—	September 4, 2002	Anderson Mesa	LONEOS	·	1.3 km	MPC · JPL
264851	2002 RG_{46}	—	September 5, 2002	Socorro	LINEAR	·	7.1 km	MPC · JPL
264852	2002 RS_{50}	—	September 5, 2002	Socorro	LINEAR	NYS	1.5 km	MPC · JPL
264853	2002 RA_{55}	—	September 5, 2002	Anderson Mesa	LONEOS	·	1.7 km	MPC · JPL
264854	2002 RF_{72}	—	September 5, 2002	Socorro	LINEAR	MAS	1.0 km	MPC · JPL
264855	2002 RW_{76}	—	September 5, 2002	Socorro	LINEAR	V	950 m	MPC · JPL
264856	2002 RF_{81}	—	September 5, 2002	Socorro	LINEAR	·	2.3 km	MPC · JPL
264857	2002 RS_{82}	—	September 5, 2002	Socorro	LINEAR	·	1.5 km	MPC · JPL
264858	2002 RH_{113}	—	September 5, 2002	Anderson Mesa	LONEOS	·	5.7 km	MPC · JPL
264859	2002 RU_{115}	—	September 6, 2002	Socorro	LINEAR	·	1.7 km	MPC · JPL
264860	2002 RR_{119}	—	September 6, 2002	Socorro	LINEAR	·	1.8 km	MPC · JPL
264861	2002 RK_{126}	—	September 8, 2002	Campo Imperatore	CINEOS	·	980 m	MPC · JPL
264862	2002 RM_{131}	—	September 11, 2002	Palomar	NEAT	·	6.0 km	MPC · JPL
264863	2002 RN_{143}	—	September 11, 2002	Palomar	NEAT	HYG	5.2 km	MPC · JPL
264864	2002 RZ_{155}	—	September 11, 2002	Palomar	NEAT	·	1.4 km	MPC · JPL
264865	2002 RT_{165}	—	September 13, 2002	Palomar	NEAT	MAS	810 m	MPC · JPL
264866	2002 RL_{166}	—	September 13, 2002	Palomar	NEAT	·	1.4 km	MPC · JPL
264867	2002 RP_{185}	—	September 12, 2002	Palomar	NEAT	TIR	4.6 km	MPC · JPL
264868	2002 RJ_{200}	—	September 13, 2002	Palomar	NEAT	·	1.8 km	MPC · JPL
264869	2002 RN_{206}	—	September 14, 2002	Palomar	NEAT	NYS ·	1.8 km	MPC · JPL
264870	2002 RH_{219}	—	September 15, 2002	Palomar	NEAT	·	2.4 km	MPC · JPL
264871	2002 RK_{224}	—	September 13, 2002	Palomar	NEAT	VER	4.9 km	MPC · JPL
264872	2002 RJ_{226}	—	September 14, 2002	Palomar	NEAT	HYG	3.9 km	MPC · JPL
264873	2002 RM_{235}	—	September 14, 2002	Palomar	R. Matson	·	3.9 km	MPC · JPL
264874	2002 RM_{240}	—	September 14, 2002	Palomar	R. Matson	·	4.0 km	MPC · JPL
264875	2002 RW_{243}	—	September 11, 2002	Haleakala	NEAT	·	4.2 km	MPC · JPL
264876	2002 RB_{248}	—	September 15, 2002	Palomar	NEAT	·	1.1 km	MPC · JPL
264877	2002 RE_{255}	—	September 15, 2002	Palomar	NEAT	·	3.8 km	MPC · JPL
264878	2002 RS_{255}	—	September 4, 2002	Palomar	NEAT	·	4.4 km	MPC · JPL
264879	2002 RV_{255}	—	September 4, 2002	Palomar	NEAT	·	4.4 km	MPC · JPL
264880	2002 RU_{272}	—	September 14, 2002	Palomar	NEAT	·	1.0 km	MPC · JPL
264881	2002 SU_{26}	—	September 29, 2002	Haleakala	NEAT	NYS	1.4 km	MPC · JPL
264882	2002 SN_{38}	—	September 30, 2002	Socorro	LINEAR	·	860 m	MPC · JPL
264883	2002 SB_{39}	—	September 30, 2002	Socorro	LINEAR	NYS	1.4 km	MPC · JPL
264884	2002 SB_{56}	—	September 30, 2002	Socorro	LINEAR	·	1.2 km	MPC · JPL
264885	2002 SY_{56}	—	September 30, 2002	Socorro	LINEAR	·	1.6 km	MPC · JPL
264886	2002 SJ_{57}	—	September 30, 2002	Haleakala	NEAT	·	1.6 km	MPC · JPL
264887	2002 SY_{59}	—	September 16, 2002	Haleakala	NEAT	·	5.2 km	MPC · JPL
264888	2002 SH_{61}	—	September 16, 2002	Palomar	NEAT	·	1.0 km	MPC · JPL
264889	2002 SH_{63}	—	September 16, 2002	Palomar	R. Matson	·	1.1 km	MPC · JPL
264890	2002 TL_{5}	—	October 1, 2002	Socorro	LINEAR	·	1.8 km	MPC · JPL
264891	2002 TX_{5}	—	October 1, 2002	Anderson Mesa	LONEOS	·	3.2 km	MPC · JPL
264892	2002 TW_{12}	—	October 1, 2002	Anderson Mesa	LONEOS	NYS	1.4 km	MPC · JPL
264893	2002 TR_{13}	—	October 1, 2002	Socorro	LINEAR	MAS	960 m	MPC · JPL
264894	2002 TR_{23}	—	October 2, 2002	Socorro	LINEAR	·	1.6 km	MPC · JPL
264895	2002 TH_{42}	—	October 2, 2002	Socorro	LINEAR	·	1.5 km	MPC · JPL
264896	2002 TW_{46}	—	October 2, 2002	Socorro	LINEAR	·	1.9 km	MPC · JPL
264897	2002 TP_{47}	—	October 2, 2002	Haleakala	NEAT	·	1.3 km	MPC · JPL
264898	2002 TW_{56}	—	October 2, 2002	Socorro	LINEAR	·	2.1 km	MPC · JPL
264899	2002 TX_{60}	—	October 3, 2002	Socorro	LINEAR	·	1.5 km	MPC · JPL
264900	2002 TK_{64}	—	October 4, 2002	Palomar	NEAT	·	1.1 km	MPC · JPL

== 264901–265000 ==
back to top

Designation			Discovery			Properties		Ref
Permanent	Provisional	Named after	Date	Site	Discoverer(s)	Category	Diam.	Ref
264901	2002 TY_{86}	—	October 3, 2002	Socorro	LINEAR	NYS	1.1 km	MPC · JPL
264902	2002 TP_{88}	—	October 3, 2002	Palomar	NEAT	·	1.9 km	MPC · JPL
264903	2002 TQ_{88}	—	October 3, 2002	Palomar	NEAT	V	1.2 km	MPC · JPL
264904	2002 TD_{89}	—	October 3, 2002	Palomar	NEAT	V	920 m	MPC · JPL
264905	2002 TH_{107}	—	October 3, 2002	Kitt Peak	Spacewatch	MAS	910 m	MPC · JPL
264906	2002 TN_{115}	—	October 3, 2002	Palomar	NEAT	CYB	5.7 km	MPC · JPL
264907	2002 TZ_{131}	—	October 4, 2002	Socorro	LINEAR	·	1.8 km	MPC · JPL
264908	2002 TJ_{135}	—	October 4, 2002	Palomar	NEAT	·	1.7 km	MPC · JPL
264909	2002 TH_{146}	—	April 9, 1999	Kitt Peak	Spacewatch	CYB	5.3 km	MPC · JPL
264910	2002 TF_{175}	—	October 4, 2002	Socorro	LINEAR	·	1.4 km	MPC · JPL
264911	2002 TK_{195}	—	October 3, 2002	Socorro	LINEAR	·	1.9 km	MPC · JPL
264912	2002 TF_{214}	—	October 3, 2002	Campo Imperatore	CINEOS	·	1.5 km	MPC · JPL
264913	2002 TD_{228}	—	October 5, 2002	Socorro	LINEAR	·	1.6 km	MPC · JPL
264914	2002 TF_{235}	—	October 6, 2002	Socorro	LINEAR	EUN	1.7 km	MPC · JPL
264915	2002 TU_{246}	—	October 9, 2002	Socorro	LINEAR	·	2.1 km	MPC · JPL
264916	2002 TB_{254}	—	October 9, 2002	Socorro	LINEAR	·	1.2 km	MPC · JPL
264917	2002 TJ_{269}	—	October 9, 2002	Socorro	LINEAR	·	1.7 km	MPC · JPL
264918	2002 TB_{279}	—	October 10, 2002	Socorro	LINEAR	·	2.3 km	MPC · JPL
264919	2002 TJ_{281}	—	October 10, 2002	Socorro	LINEAR	V	1.1 km	MPC · JPL
264920	2002 TM_{298}	—	October 12, 2002	Socorro	LINEAR	·	1.7 km	MPC · JPL
264921	2002 TQ_{312}	—	October 4, 2002	Apache Point	SDSS	·	1.4 km	MPC · JPL
264922	2002 TB_{320}	—	October 5, 2002	Apache Point	SDSS	·	910 m	MPC · JPL
264923	2002 TX_{331}	—	October 5, 2002	Apache Point	SDSS	·	800 m	MPC · JPL
264924	2002 TJ_{358}	—	October 10, 2002	Apache Point	SDSS	·	1.3 km	MPC · JPL
264925	2002 UU_{11}	—	October 28, 2002	Socorro	LINEAR	H	850 m	MPC · JPL
264926	2002 UP_{28}	—	October 30, 2002	Palomar	NEAT	·	1.9 km	MPC · JPL
264927	2002 UG_{33}	—	October 31, 2002	Anderson Mesa	LONEOS	·	1.4 km	MPC · JPL
264928	2002 UR_{37}	—	October 31, 2002	Palomar	NEAT	·	1.3 km	MPC · JPL
264929	2002 UC_{39}	—	October 31, 2002	Palomar	NEAT	·	1.6 km	MPC · JPL
264930	2002 UB_{49}	—	October 31, 2002	Socorro	LINEAR	·	2.0 km	MPC · JPL
264931	2002 VS_{12}	—	November 4, 2002	Anderson Mesa	LONEOS	·	1.7 km	MPC · JPL
264932	2002 VV_{34}	—	November 5, 2002	Socorro	LINEAR	·	2.4 km	MPC · JPL
264933	2002 VQ_{35}	—	November 5, 2002	Socorro	LINEAR	NYS	1.4 km	MPC · JPL
264934	2002 VU_{35}	—	November 5, 2002	Socorro	LINEAR	·	2.1 km	MPC · JPL
264935	2002 VW_{40}	—	November 1, 2002	Palomar	NEAT	·	1.7 km	MPC · JPL
264936	2002 VO_{41}	—	November 5, 2002	Palomar	NEAT	MAS	930 m	MPC · JPL
264937	2002 VZ_{60}	—	November 5, 2002	Socorro	LINEAR	V	940 m	MPC · JPL
264938	2002 VV_{71}	—	November 7, 2002	Socorro	LINEAR	·	1.6 km	MPC · JPL
264939	2002 VV_{88}	—	November 11, 2002	Anderson Mesa	LONEOS	·	1.4 km	MPC · JPL
264940	2002 VT_{93}	—	November 12, 2002	Socorro	LINEAR	·	2.0 km	MPC · JPL
264941	2002 VV_{93}	—	November 12, 2002	Socorro	LINEAR	·	1.8 km	MPC · JPL
264942	2002 VN_{113}	—	November 13, 2002	Palomar	NEAT	·	1.6 km	MPC · JPL
264943	2002 VD_{123}	—	November 13, 2002	Palomar	NEAT	·	1.8 km	MPC · JPL
264944	2002 VP_{124}	—	November 11, 2002	Socorro	LINEAR	·	4.6 km	MPC · JPL
264945	2002 VR_{127}	—	November 11, 2002	Goodricke-Pigott	R. A. Tucker	PHO	1.4 km	MPC · JPL
264946	2002 VK_{128}	—	November 14, 2002	Socorro	LINEAR	·	1.3 km	MPC · JPL
264947	2002 VU_{131}	—	November 5, 2002	Mount Nyukasa	National Aerospace Laboratory of Japan	·	1.5 km	MPC · JPL
264948	2002 VV_{139}	—	November 7, 2002	Apache Point	SDSS	·	2.7 km	MPC · JPL
264949	2002 WR_{7}	—	November 24, 2002	Palomar	NEAT	slow	1.6 km	MPC · JPL
264950	2002 WR_{14}	—	November 28, 2002	Anderson Mesa	LONEOS	·	2.3 km	MPC · JPL
264951	2002 WB_{29}	—	November 24, 2002	Palomar	NEAT	·	1.5 km	MPC · JPL
264952	2002 XW_{7}	—	December 2, 2002	Socorro	LINEAR	MAS	1.3 km	MPC · JPL
264953	2002 XY_{17}	—	December 5, 2002	Socorro	LINEAR	MAS	890 m	MPC · JPL
264954	2002 XV_{22}	—	December 3, 2002	Palomar	NEAT	NYS	1.6 km	MPC · JPL
264955	2002 XY_{25}	—	December 5, 2002	Socorro	LINEAR	·	1.7 km	MPC · JPL
264956	2002 XB_{27}	—	December 5, 2002	Kitt Peak	Spacewatch	·	1.1 km	MPC · JPL
264957	2002 XV_{35}	—	December 5, 2002	Socorro	LINEAR	·	1.7 km	MPC · JPL
264958	2002 XW_{48}	—	December 10, 2002	Socorro	LINEAR	·	2.0 km	MPC · JPL
264959	2002 XD_{51}	—	December 10, 2002	Socorro	LINEAR	NYS	1.9 km	MPC · JPL
264960	2002 XG_{51}	—	December 10, 2002	Socorro	LINEAR	·	1.9 km	MPC · JPL
264961	2002 XE_{55}	—	December 10, 2002	Palomar	NEAT	NYS	1.5 km	MPC · JPL
264962	2002 XG_{57}	—	December 10, 2002	Palomar	NEAT	·	1.8 km	MPC · JPL
264963	2002 XH_{119}	—	December 10, 2002	Palomar	NEAT	·	1.1 km	MPC · JPL
264964	2002 YY_{1}	—	December 27, 2002	Socorro	LINEAR	H	820 m	MPC · JPL
264965	2002 YF_{33}	—	December 30, 2002	Socorro	LINEAR	·	2.6 km	MPC · JPL
264966	2003 AD	—	January 1, 2003	Socorro	LINEAR	H	820 m	MPC · JPL
264967	2003 AK_{17}	—	January 5, 2003	Socorro	LINEAR	H	750 m	MPC · JPL
264968	2003 AA_{36}	—	January 7, 2003	Socorro	LINEAR	·	2.0 km	MPC · JPL
264969	2003 AR_{59}	—	January 5, 2003	Socorro	LINEAR	H	1.0 km	MPC · JPL
264970	2003 AQ_{72}	—	January 11, 2003	Socorro	LINEAR	H	880 m	MPC · JPL
264971	2003 AM_{80}	—	January 10, 2003	Socorro	LINEAR	H	870 m	MPC · JPL
264972	2003 BY_{2}	—	January 25, 2003	Socorro	LINEAR	H	970 m	MPC · JPL
264973	2003 BQ_{18}	—	January 27, 2003	Socorro	LINEAR	(5)	1.4 km	MPC · JPL
264974	2003 BT_{34}	—	January 26, 2003	Haleakala	NEAT	·	1.9 km	MPC · JPL
264975	2003 BF_{39}	—	January 27, 2003	Socorro	LINEAR	·	1.9 km	MPC · JPL
264976	2003 BW_{42}	—	January 28, 2003	Socorro	LINEAR	H	820 m	MPC · JPL
264977	2003 BG_{47}	—	January 29, 2003	Palomar	NEAT	·	2.1 km	MPC · JPL
264978	2003 BJ_{49}	—	January 26, 2003	Haleakala	NEAT	H	870 m	MPC · JPL
264979	2003 BB_{53}	—	January 27, 2003	Anderson Mesa	LONEOS	H	800 m	MPC · JPL
264980	2003 BY_{77}	—	January 30, 2003	Haleakala	NEAT	·	1.3 km	MPC · JPL
264981	2003 BE_{80}	—	January 31, 2003	Kitt Peak	Spacewatch	H	820 m	MPC · JPL
264982	2003 BK_{80}	—	January 31, 2003	Anderson Mesa	LONEOS	·	1.5 km	MPC · JPL
264983	2003 BN_{80}	—	January 31, 2003	Anderson Mesa	LONEOS	·	2.1 km	MPC · JPL
264984	2003 BK_{92}	—	January 27, 2003	Socorro	LINEAR	·	2.0 km	MPC · JPL
264985	2003 CE_{7}	—	February 1, 2003	Socorro	LINEAR	·	1.9 km	MPC · JPL
264986	2003 CK_{11}	—	February 4, 2003	Anderson Mesa	LONEOS	H	730 m	MPC · JPL
264987	2003 CP_{19}	—	February 7, 2003	Palomar	NEAT	H	850 m	MPC · JPL
264988	2003 CS_{25}	—	February 12, 2003	Haleakala	NEAT	·	2.0 km	MPC · JPL
264989	2003 DE_{1}	—	February 21, 2003	Palomar	NEAT	·	1.3 km	MPC · JPL
264990	2003 DR_{4}	—	February 22, 2003	Kleť	Kleť	T_{j} (2.97) · 3:2	6.4 km	MPC · JPL
264991	2003 DD_{9}	—	February 24, 2003	Campo Imperatore	CINEOS	·	1.9 km	MPC · JPL
264992	2003 DJ_{9}	—	February 24, 2003	Campo Imperatore	CINEOS	·	1.7 km	MPC · JPL
264993	2003 DX_{10}	—	February 26, 2003	Socorro	LINEAR	APO · PHA	290 m	MPC · JPL
264994	2003 DC_{17}	—	February 21, 2003	Palomar	NEAT	·	1.4 km	MPC · JPL
264995	2003 DB_{21}	—	February 22, 2003	Palomar	NEAT	·	1.9 km	MPC · JPL
264996	2003 ET	—	March 5, 2003	Socorro	LINEAR	H	790 m	MPC · JPL
264997	2003 EA_{4}	—	March 5, 2003	Socorro	LINEAR	H	780 m	MPC · JPL
264998	2003 EB_{9}	—	March 6, 2003	Socorro	LINEAR	MAR	1.6 km	MPC · JPL
264999	2003 EO_{30}	—	March 6, 2003	Palomar	NEAT	H	720 m	MPC · JPL
265000	2003 EK_{33}	—	March 7, 2003	Anderson Mesa	LONEOS	·	1.5 km	MPC · JPL

back to top

== See also ==
- Meanings of minor-planet names: 264001–265000
