= Meanings of minor-planet names: 224001–225000 =

As minor planet discoveries are confirmed, they are given a permanent number by the IAU's Minor Planet Center (MPC), and the discoverers can then submit names for them, following the IAU's naming conventions. The list below concerns those minor planets in the specified number-range that have received names, and explains the meanings of those names.

Official naming citations of newly named small Solar System bodies are approved and published in a bulletin by IAU's Working Group for Small Bodies Nomenclature (WGSBN). Before May 2021, citations were published in MPC's Minor Planet Circulars for many decades. Recent citations can also be found on the JPL Small-Body Database (SBDB). Until his death in 2016, German astronomer Lutz D. Schmadel compiled these citations into the Dictionary of Minor Planet Names (DMP) and regularly updated the collection.

Based on Paul Herget's The Names of the Minor Planets, Schmadel also researched the unclear origin of numerous asteroids, most of which had been named prior to World War II. This article incorporates text from this source, which is in the public domain: SBDB New namings may only be added to this list below after official publication as the preannouncement of names is condemned. The WGSBN publishes a comprehensive guideline for the naming rules of non-cometary small Solar System bodies.

== 224001–224100 ==
Named minor planet	Provisional	This minor planet was named for...	Ref · Catalog
224027 Grégoire	2005 LV_{23}	Grégoire Boissenot (born 1979), better known as Grégoire, is a French composer, author and singer.	JPL · 224027
224067 Colemila	2005 NO_{29}	Cole Osmonson (born 2016) and Mila Rodriguez (born 2016) are great-grandchildren of the discoverer	JPL · 224067

== 224101–224200 ==
back to top

Named minor planet	Provisional	This minor planet was named for...	Ref · Catalog
There are no named minor planets in this number range

== 224201–224300 ==
back to top

Named minor planet	Provisional	This minor planet was named for...	Ref · Catalog
224206 Pietchisson	2005 SY	"Pietchisson", the name of an old isolated farmhouse in the Swiss Jura	JPL · 224206

== 224301–224400 ==
back to top

Named minor planet	Provisional	This minor planet was named for...	Ref · Catalog
There are no named minor planets in this number range

== 224401–224500 ==
back to top

Named minor planet	Provisional	This minor planet was named for...	Ref · Catalog
There are no named minor planets in this number range

== 224501–224600 ==
back to top

Named minor planet	Provisional	This minor planet was named for...	Ref · Catalog
224591 Fattig	2005 XG_{103}	Eric D. Fattig (born 1987), American heliophysicist and member of the New Horizons Solar Wind Around Pluto instrument science team.	JPL · 224591
224592 Carnac	2005 YJ_{4}	Carnac, Brittany, in north-western France. The site was already inhabited in prehistoric times, and is famous for its numerous Neolithic standing stones.	JPL · 224592

== 224601–224700 ==
back to top

Named minor planet	Provisional	This minor planet was named for...	Ref · Catalog
224617 Micromégas	2005 YZ_{70}	Micromégas, a short humoristic tale written by the French philosopher Voltaire in 1752.	JPL · 224617
224693 Morganfreeman	2006 BO_{26}	Morgan Freeman (born 1937), an American actor and director, nominated for Academy Awards five times, winning once for Million Dollar Baby (2004).	JPL · 224693

== 224701–224800 ==
back to top

Named minor planet	Provisional	This minor planet was named for...	Ref · Catalog
There are no named minor planets in this number range

== 224801–224900 ==
back to top

Named minor planet	Provisional	This minor planet was named for...	Ref · Catalog
224831 Neeffisis	2006 WV_{129}	Christian Ernst Neeff (1782–1849), a German physician, co-founder of the physics society "Physikalischer Verein" in 1824.	JPL · 224831
224858 Kunmária	2006 YO_{49}	Mária Kun, Hungarian astronomer.	IAU · 224858
224888 Cochingchu	2007 CC_{6}	Coching Chu or Zhu Kezhen (1890–1974), a prominent Chinese meteorologist, geologist and educator	JPL · 224888

== 224901–225000 ==
back to top

Named minor planet	Provisional	This minor planet was named for...	Ref · Catalog
224962 Michaelgrünewald	2007 ER_{26}	Michael Grünewald (born 1965), the son-in-law of German discoverer Rolf Apitzsch	JPL · 224962

back to top

Preceded by 223,001–224,000	Meanings of minor-planet names List of minor planets: 224,001–225,000	Succeeded by 225,001–226,000
