= List of minor planets: 224001–225000 =

The following is a partial list of minor planets, running from minor-planet number 224001 through 225000, inclusive. The primary data for this and other partial lists is based on JPL's "Small-Body Orbital Elements" and data available from the Minor Planet Center. Critical list information is also provided by the MPC, unless otherwise specified from Lowell Observatory. A detailed description of the table's columns and additional sources are given on the main page including a complete list of every page in this series, and a statistical break-up on the dynamical classification of minor planets.

Also see the summary list of all named bodies in numerical and alphabetical order, and the corresponding naming citations for the number range of this particular list. New namings may only be added to this list after official publication, as the preannouncement of names is condemned by the Working Group for Small Bodies Nomenclature of the International Astronomical Union.

Near-Earth obj.	MBA (inner)	MBA (outer)	Centaur
Mars-crosser	MBA (middle)	Jupiter trojan	Trans-Neptunian obj.
Unclassified

== 224001–224100 ==
Designation			Discovery			Properties		Ref
Permanent	Provisional	Named after	Date	Site	Discoverer(s)	Category	Diam.	Ref
224001	2005 GE_{30}	—	April 4, 2005	Catalina	CSS	V	840 m	MPC · JPL
224002	2005 GE_{58}	—	April 6, 2005	Mount Lemmon	Mount Lemmon Survey	·	780 m	MPC · JPL
224003	2005 GK_{59}	—	April 6, 2005	Catalina	CSS	H	930 m	MPC · JPL
224004	2005 GX_{59}	—	April 4, 2005	Catalina	CSS	·	1.3 km	MPC · JPL
224005	2005 GP_{65}	—	April 2, 2005	Mount Lemmon	Mount Lemmon Survey	·	1.1 km	MPC · JPL
224006	2005 GC_{69}	—	April 2, 2005	Mount Lemmon	Mount Lemmon Survey	·	750 m	MPC · JPL
224007	2005 GP_{84}	—	April 4, 2005	Kitt Peak	Spacewatch	·	800 m	MPC · JPL
224008	2005 GC_{95}	—	April 6, 2005	Kitt Peak	Spacewatch	3:2	6.0 km	MPC · JPL
224009	2005 GU_{96}	—	April 6, 2005	Mount Lemmon	Mount Lemmon Survey	·	950 m	MPC · JPL
224010	2005 GS_{99}	—	April 7, 2005	Kitt Peak	Spacewatch	·	1.2 km	MPC · JPL
224011	2005 GO_{154}	—	April 9, 2005	Socorro	LINEAR	HIL · 3:2	9.6 km	MPC · JPL
224012	2005 GF_{156}	—	April 10, 2005	Mount Lemmon	Mount Lemmon Survey	·	840 m	MPC · JPL
224013	2005 JK_{4}	—	May 3, 2005	Socorro	LINEAR	·	1.2 km	MPC · JPL
224014	2005 JQ_{15}	—	May 3, 2005	Kitt Peak	Spacewatch	·	740 m	MPC · JPL
224015	2005 JF_{19}	—	May 4, 2005	Mount Lemmon	Mount Lemmon Survey	·	950 m	MPC · JPL
224016	2005 JF_{43}	—	May 8, 2005	Mount Lemmon	Mount Lemmon Survey	·	800 m	MPC · JPL
224017	2005 JA_{65}	—	May 4, 2005	Kitt Peak	Spacewatch	·	690 m	MPC · JPL
224018	2005 JT_{67}	—	May 4, 2005	Palomar	NEAT	·	920 m	MPC · JPL
224019	2005 JX_{78}	—	May 10, 2005	Mount Lemmon	Mount Lemmon Survey	·	1.0 km	MPC · JPL
224020	2005 JL_{160}	—	May 7, 2005	Mount Lemmon	Mount Lemmon Survey	L4	20 km	MPC · JPL
224021	2005 KT_{2}	—	May 16, 2005	Mount Lemmon	Mount Lemmon Survey	·	880 m	MPC · JPL
224022	2005 KZ_{12}	—	May 20, 2005	Siding Spring	SSS	·	3.0 km	MPC · JPL
224023	2005 LJ_{3}	—	June 3, 2005	Kitt Peak	Spacewatch	·	1.0 km	MPC · JPL
224024	2005 LO_{7}	—	June 4, 2005	Socorro	LINEAR	·	950 m	MPC · JPL
224025	2005 LY_{15}	—	June 5, 2005	Kitt Peak	Spacewatch	·	1.1 km	MPC · JPL
224026	2005 LB_{21}	—	June 5, 2005	Socorro	LINEAR	·	1.1 km	MPC · JPL
224027 Grégoire	2005 LV_{23}	Grégoire	June 10, 2005	Vicques	M. Ory	·	1.5 km	MPC · JPL
224028	2005 LC_{24}	—	June 4, 2005	Socorro	LINEAR	PHO	1.2 km	MPC · JPL
224029	2005 LO_{33}	—	June 10, 2005	Kitt Peak	Spacewatch	·	1.1 km	MPC · JPL
224030	2005 LY_{35}	—	June 11, 2005	Catalina	CSS	·	3.1 km	MPC · JPL
224031	2005 LP_{41}	—	June 12, 2005	Kitt Peak	Spacewatch	NYS	1.8 km	MPC · JPL
224032	2005 LT_{46}	—	June 13, 2005	Kitt Peak	Spacewatch	·	1.2 km	MPC · JPL
224033	2005 LG_{47}	—	June 13, 2005	Mount Lemmon	Mount Lemmon Survey	MAS	900 m	MPC · JPL
224034	2005 LD_{48}	—	June 10, 2005	Reedy Creek	J. Broughton	·	2.0 km	MPC · JPL
224035	2005 LP_{53}	—	June 5, 2005	Kitt Peak	Spacewatch	·	1.2 km	MPC · JPL
224036	2005 MS	—	June 17, 2005	Mount Lemmon	Mount Lemmon Survey	·	1.5 km	MPC · JPL
224037	2005 MP_{3}	—	June 25, 2005	Palomar	NEAT	·	1.4 km	MPC · JPL
224038	2005 MP_{4}	—	June 17, 2005	Mount Lemmon	Mount Lemmon Survey	·	1.2 km	MPC · JPL
224039	2005 MA_{6}	—	June 24, 2005	Palomar	NEAT	·	1.2 km	MPC · JPL
224040	2005 ML_{9}	—	June 28, 2005	Kitt Peak	Spacewatch	CLA	2.4 km	MPC · JPL
224041	2005 MP_{9}	—	June 28, 2005	Palomar	NEAT	V	1.0 km	MPC · JPL
224042	2005 MK_{14}	—	June 28, 2005	Palomar	NEAT	V	860 m	MPC · JPL
224043	2005 MP_{18}	—	June 28, 2005	Mount Lemmon	Mount Lemmon Survey	·	1.4 km	MPC · JPL
224044	2005 MQ_{18}	—	June 28, 2005	Palomar	NEAT	MAS	840 m	MPC · JPL
224045	2005 MF_{20}	—	June 29, 2005	Catalina	CSS	·	1.3 km	MPC · JPL
224046	2005 MW_{22}	—	June 30, 2005	Catalina	CSS	·	1.7 km	MPC · JPL
224047	2005 MJ_{29}	—	June 29, 2005	Kitt Peak	Spacewatch	·	910 m	MPC · JPL
224048	2005 MJ_{31}	—	June 30, 2005	Kitt Peak	Spacewatch	MAS	860 m	MPC · JPL
224049	2005 MQ_{36}	—	June 30, 2005	Kitt Peak	Spacewatch	·	1.6 km	MPC · JPL
224050	2005 MP_{37}	—	June 30, 2005	Kitt Peak	Spacewatch	·	1.0 km	MPC · JPL
224051	2005 MC_{42}	—	June 28, 2005	Palomar	NEAT	ERI	2.7 km	MPC · JPL
224052	2005 MD_{42}	—	June 28, 2005	Palomar	NEAT	·	1.5 km	MPC · JPL
224053	2005 MV_{45}	—	June 27, 2005	Palomar	NEAT	·	2.1 km	MPC · JPL
224054	2005 MC_{50}	—	June 30, 2005	Kitt Peak	Spacewatch	·	1.4 km	MPC · JPL
224055	2005 ME_{50}	—	June 30, 2005	Kitt Peak	Spacewatch	·	1.4 km	MPC · JPL
224056	2005 MH_{50}	—	June 30, 2005	Anderson Mesa	LONEOS	·	1.0 km	MPC · JPL
224057	2005 ML_{53}	—	June 16, 2005	Siding Spring	SSS	PHO	1.6 km	MPC · JPL
224058	2005 MP_{54}	—	June 17, 2005	Mount Lemmon	Mount Lemmon Survey	NYS	1.3 km	MPC · JPL
224059	2005 NK_{2}	—	July 2, 2005	Kitt Peak	Spacewatch	MAS	650 m	MPC · JPL
224060	2005 NM_{3}	—	July 1, 2005	Kitt Peak	Spacewatch	·	1.5 km	MPC · JPL
224061	2005 NA_{8}	—	July 1, 2005	Kitt Peak	Spacewatch	·	1.2 km	MPC · JPL
224062	2005 NB_{10}	—	July 3, 2005	Mount Lemmon	Mount Lemmon Survey	MAS	770 m	MPC · JPL
224063	2005 NE_{17}	—	July 3, 2005	Mount Lemmon	Mount Lemmon Survey	·	1.3 km	MPC · JPL
224064	2005 NT_{19}	—	July 5, 2005	Mount Lemmon	Mount Lemmon Survey	NYS	1.3 km	MPC · JPL
224065	2005 NK_{22}	—	July 1, 2005	Kitt Peak	Spacewatch	·	1.2 km	MPC · JPL
224066	2005 NZ_{27}	—	July 5, 2005	Palomar	NEAT	NYS	1.3 km	MPC · JPL
224067 Colemila	2005 NO_{29}	Colemila	July 8, 2005	Wrightwood	J. W. Young	·	2.4 km	MPC · JPL
224068	2005 NJ_{40}	—	July 3, 2005	Mount Lemmon	Mount Lemmon Survey	MAS	940 m	MPC · JPL
224069	2005 NN_{46}	—	July 5, 2005	Palomar	NEAT	·	1.5 km	MPC · JPL
224070	2005 NO_{46}	—	July 6, 2005	Kitt Peak	Spacewatch	·	1.2 km	MPC · JPL
224071	2005 NR_{46}	—	July 6, 2005	Kitt Peak	Spacewatch	·	1.3 km	MPC · JPL
224072	2005 NK_{49}	—	July 1, 2005	Kitt Peak	Spacewatch	(2076)	940 m	MPC · JPL
224073	2005 NW_{50}	—	July 5, 2005	Palomar	NEAT	·	1.2 km	MPC · JPL
224074	2005 NJ_{53}	—	July 10, 2005	Kitt Peak	Spacewatch	·	1.0 km	MPC · JPL
224075	2005 NP_{55}	—	July 9, 2005	Reedy Creek	J. Broughton	·	1.1 km	MPC · JPL
224076	2005 NX_{60}	—	July 11, 2005	Anderson Mesa	LONEOS	ERI	3.0 km	MPC · JPL
224077	2005 NM_{61}	—	July 11, 2005	Kitt Peak	Spacewatch	·	1.1 km	MPC · JPL
224078	2005 NV_{64}	—	July 1, 2005	Kitt Peak	Spacewatch	·	1.1 km	MPC · JPL
224079	2005 NJ_{70}	—	July 4, 2005	Palomar	NEAT	NYS	1.3 km	MPC · JPL
224080	2005 NU_{71}	—	July 5, 2005	Mount Lemmon	Mount Lemmon Survey	·	1.3 km	MPC · JPL
224081	2005 NM_{74}	—	July 9, 2005	Kitt Peak	Spacewatch	·	1.2 km	MPC · JPL
224082	2005 NE_{80}	—	July 10, 2005	Reedy Creek	J. Broughton	V	920 m	MPC · JPL
224083	2005 NL_{80}	—	July 13, 2005	Reedy Creek	J. Broughton	·	1.3 km	MPC · JPL
224084	2005 NM_{83}	—	July 1, 2005	Kitt Peak	Spacewatch	·	1.3 km	MPC · JPL
224085	2005 NU_{84}	—	July 2, 2005	Catalina	CSS	·	2.0 km	MPC · JPL
224086	2005 NW_{84}	—	July 2, 2005	Catalina	CSS	V	1.2 km	MPC · JPL
224087	2005 NR_{86}	—	July 3, 2005	Catalina	CSS	·	1.7 km	MPC · JPL
224088	2005 NS_{99}	—	July 11, 2005	Catalina	CSS	·	2.0 km	MPC · JPL
224089	2005 NT_{100}	—	July 1, 2005	Anderson Mesa	LONEOS	·	2.2 km	MPC · JPL
224090	2005 NO_{123}	—	July 10, 2005	Kitt Peak	Spacewatch	·	1.4 km	MPC · JPL
224091	2005 OQ_{4}	—	July 27, 2005	Palomar	NEAT	·	1.3 km	MPC · JPL
224092	2005 OH_{8}	—	July 26, 2005	Palomar	NEAT	·	1.5 km	MPC · JPL
224093	2005 OK_{10}	—	July 27, 2005	Palomar	NEAT	·	2.0 km	MPC · JPL
224094	2005 OM_{11}	—	July 28, 2005	Palomar	NEAT	·	1.6 km	MPC · JPL
224095	2005 OD_{12}	—	July 29, 2005	Palomar	NEAT	NYS	1.5 km	MPC · JPL
224096	2005 ON_{12}	—	July 29, 2005	Palomar	NEAT	MAS	950 m	MPC · JPL
224097	2005 OS_{13}	—	July 29, 2005	Siding Spring	SSS	·	2.5 km	MPC · JPL
224098	2005 OG_{15}	—	July 29, 2005	Reedy Creek	J. Broughton	·	2.1 km	MPC · JPL
224099	2005 OP_{16}	—	July 29, 2005	Palomar	NEAT	MAS	1.1 km	MPC · JPL
224100	2005 OZ_{18}	—	July 31, 2005	Palomar	NEAT	·	1.3 km	MPC · JPL

== 224101–224200 ==
back to top

Designation			Discovery			Properties		Ref
Permanent	Provisional	Named after	Date	Site	Discoverer(s)	Category	Diam.	Ref
224101	2005 ON_{20}	—	July 28, 2005	Palomar	NEAT	·	1.6 km	MPC · JPL
224102	2005 OV_{21}	—	July 29, 2005	Palomar	NEAT	·	1.5 km	MPC · JPL
224103	2005 OC_{28}	—	July 30, 2005	Palomar	NEAT	·	1.4 km	MPC · JPL
224104	2005 OD_{28}	—	July 30, 2005	Palomar	NEAT	·	1.4 km	MPC · JPL
224105	2005 PN_{2}	—	August 2, 2005	Socorro	LINEAR	MAS	1.1 km	MPC · JPL
224106	2005 PR_{2}	—	August 2, 2005	Socorro	LINEAR	·	2.0 km	MPC · JPL
224107	2005 PY_{2}	—	August 2, 2005	Socorro	LINEAR	NYS	1.3 km	MPC · JPL
224108	2005 PD_{3}	—	August 2, 2005	Socorro	LINEAR	·	1.1 km	MPC · JPL
224109	2005 PK_{3}	—	August 4, 2005	Palomar	NEAT	MAS	1.0 km	MPC · JPL
224110	2005 PV_{3}	—	August 6, 2005	Reedy Creek	J. Broughton	NYS	1.6 km	MPC · JPL
224111	2005 PR_{11}	—	August 4, 2005	Palomar	NEAT	·	1.9 km	MPC · JPL
224112	2005 PE_{12}	—	August 4, 2005	Palomar	NEAT	MAS	1.1 km	MPC · JPL
224113	2005 PA_{13}	—	August 4, 2005	Palomar	NEAT	·	1.6 km	MPC · JPL
224114	2005 PJ_{14}	—	August 4, 2005	Palomar	NEAT	·	2.3 km	MPC · JPL
224115	2005 PN_{18}	—	August 11, 2005	Reedy Creek	J. Broughton	·	1.5 km	MPC · JPL
224116	2005 QO_{3}	—	August 24, 2005	Palomar	NEAT	·	1.2 km	MPC · JPL
224117	2005 QV_{6}	—	August 24, 2005	Palomar	NEAT	NYS	1.3 km	MPC · JPL
224118	2005 QH_{7}	—	August 24, 2005	Palomar	NEAT	·	1.6 km	MPC · JPL
224119	2005 QZ_{7}	—	August 24, 2005	Palomar	NEAT	·	1.7 km	MPC · JPL
224120	2005 QM_{8}	—	August 25, 2005	Palomar	NEAT	NYS	1.6 km	MPC · JPL
224121	2005 QM_{10}	—	August 25, 2005	Campo Imperatore	CINEOS	·	1.2 km	MPC · JPL
224122	2005 QZ_{10}	—	August 27, 2005	Junk Bond	D. Healy	·	1.6 km	MPC · JPL
224123	2005 QA_{13}	—	August 24, 2005	Palomar	NEAT	V	840 m	MPC · JPL
224124	2005 QO_{13}	—	August 24, 2005	Palomar	NEAT	V	1.2 km	MPC · JPL
224125	2005 QF_{16}	—	August 25, 2005	Palomar	NEAT	MAS	880 m	MPC · JPL
224126	2005 QN_{17}	—	August 25, 2005	Palomar	NEAT	·	1.7 km	MPC · JPL
224127	2005 QX_{17}	—	August 25, 2005	Palomar	NEAT	MAS	1.0 km	MPC · JPL
224128	2005 QC_{18}	—	August 25, 2005	Palomar	NEAT	MAS	1.0 km	MPC · JPL
224129	2005 QG_{21}	—	August 26, 2005	Anderson Mesa	LONEOS	NYS ·	2.7 km	MPC · JPL
224130	2005 QH_{25}	—	August 27, 2005	Kitt Peak	Spacewatch	·	1.4 km	MPC · JPL
224131	2005 QO_{28}	—	August 28, 2005	Vicques	M. Ory	NYS	1.5 km	MPC · JPL
224132	2005 QA_{33}	—	August 25, 2005	Palomar	NEAT	NYS	1.3 km	MPC · JPL
224133	2005 QN_{33}	—	August 25, 2005	Palomar	NEAT	NYS	1.5 km	MPC · JPL
224134	2005 QU_{33}	—	August 25, 2005	Palomar	NEAT	MAS	930 m	MPC · JPL
224135	2005 QA_{36}	—	August 25, 2005	Palomar	NEAT	·	1.6 km	MPC · JPL
224136	2005 QF_{36}	—	August 25, 2005	Palomar	NEAT	NYS ·	1.9 km	MPC · JPL
224137	2005 QD_{40}	—	August 26, 2005	Palomar	NEAT	V	1.0 km	MPC · JPL
224138	2005 QL_{40}	—	August 26, 2005	Palomar	NEAT	·	1.7 km	MPC · JPL
224139	2005 QV_{41}	—	August 26, 2005	Anderson Mesa	LONEOS	·	1.7 km	MPC · JPL
224140	2005 QK_{42}	—	August 26, 2005	Anderson Mesa	LONEOS	MAS	1.0 km	MPC · JPL
224141	2005 QE_{44}	—	August 26, 2005	Palomar	NEAT	·	1.7 km	MPC · JPL
224142	2005 QL_{44}	—	August 26, 2005	Palomar	NEAT	NYS	1.9 km	MPC · JPL
224143	2005 QU_{44}	—	August 26, 2005	Palomar	NEAT	·	1.5 km	MPC · JPL
224144	2005 QB_{45}	—	August 26, 2005	Palomar	NEAT	MAS	1.1 km	MPC · JPL
224145	2005 QZ_{47}	—	August 26, 2005	Palomar	NEAT	NYS	1.9 km	MPC · JPL
224146	2005 QV_{50}	—	August 26, 2005	Palomar	NEAT	NYS	1.6 km	MPC · JPL
224147	2005 QL_{51}	—	August 26, 2005	Campo Imperatore	CINEOS	·	1.5 km	MPC · JPL
224148	2005 QA_{52}	—	August 27, 2005	Anderson Mesa	LONEOS	NYS	1.5 km	MPC · JPL
224149	2005 QA_{54}	—	August 28, 2005	Kitt Peak	Spacewatch	·	1.4 km	MPC · JPL
224150	2005 QD_{55}	—	August 28, 2005	Anderson Mesa	LONEOS	·	1.9 km	MPC · JPL
224151	2005 QF_{60}	—	August 26, 2005	Anderson Mesa	LONEOS	·	2.1 km	MPC · JPL
224152	2005 QR_{62}	—	August 26, 2005	Palomar	NEAT	·	1.4 km	MPC · JPL
224153	2005 QS_{63}	—	August 26, 2005	Palomar	NEAT	NYS	1.6 km	MPC · JPL
224154	2005 QB_{64}	—	August 26, 2005	Palomar	NEAT	·	1.6 km	MPC · JPL
224155	2005 QS_{65}	—	August 27, 2005	Anderson Mesa	LONEOS	·	1.1 km	MPC · JPL
224156	2005 QY_{66}	—	August 28, 2005	Kitt Peak	Spacewatch	·	1.2 km	MPC · JPL
224157	2005 QC_{68}	—	August 28, 2005	Siding Spring	SSS	MAS	890 m	MPC · JPL
224158	2005 QV_{71}	—	August 29, 2005	Anderson Mesa	LONEOS	NYS	1.7 km	MPC · JPL
224159	2005 QQ_{73}	—	August 29, 2005	Anderson Mesa	LONEOS	·	3.4 km	MPC · JPL
224160	2005 QB_{75}	—	August 25, 2005	Kingsnake	J. V. McClusky	·	1.3 km	MPC · JPL
224161	2005 QT_{84}	—	August 30, 2005	Socorro	LINEAR	·	1.6 km	MPC · JPL
224162	2005 QM_{85}	—	August 30, 2005	Kitt Peak	Spacewatch	·	1.6 km	MPC · JPL
224163	2005 QW_{89}	—	August 24, 2005	Palomar	NEAT	·	1.6 km	MPC · JPL
224164	2005 QN_{93}	—	August 26, 2005	Palomar	NEAT	·	1.2 km	MPC · JPL
224165	2005 QJ_{94}	—	August 27, 2005	Palomar	NEAT	MAS	1.1 km	MPC · JPL
224166	2005 QJ_{97}	—	August 27, 2005	Palomar	NEAT	·	1.7 km	MPC · JPL
224167	2005 QM_{99}	—	August 27, 2005	Palomar	NEAT	·	1.8 km	MPC · JPL
224168	2005 QX_{101}	—	August 27, 2005	Palomar	NEAT	·	2.4 km	MPC · JPL
224169	2005 QA_{104}	—	August 27, 2005	Palomar	NEAT	·	1.6 km	MPC · JPL
224170	2005 QS_{108}	—	August 27, 2005	Palomar	NEAT	·	1.8 km	MPC · JPL
224171	2005 QF_{109}	—	August 27, 2005	Palomar	NEAT	NYS	1.5 km	MPC · JPL
224172	2005 QV_{109}	—	August 27, 2005	Palomar	NEAT	SUL	2.0 km	MPC · JPL
224173	2005 QA_{111}	—	August 27, 2005	Palomar	NEAT	MAS	780 m	MPC · JPL
224174	2005 QV_{113}	—	August 27, 2005	Palomar	NEAT	·	1.5 km	MPC · JPL
224175	2005 QE_{134}	—	August 28, 2005	Kitt Peak	Spacewatch	NYS	1.4 km	MPC · JPL
224176	2005 QY_{138}	—	August 28, 2005	Kitt Peak	Spacewatch	·	1.3 km	MPC · JPL
224177	2005 QV_{140}	—	August 29, 2005	Socorro	LINEAR	·	1.1 km	MPC · JPL
224178	2005 QP_{151}	—	August 30, 2005	Kitt Peak	Spacewatch	MAS	880 m	MPC · JPL
224179	2005 QD_{154}	—	August 27, 2005	Palomar	NEAT	·	1.7 km	MPC · JPL
224180	2005 QX_{157}	—	August 26, 2005	Palomar	NEAT	·	2.0 km	MPC · JPL
224181	2005 QG_{158}	—	August 26, 2005	Palomar	NEAT	·	1.7 km	MPC · JPL
224182	2005 QF_{163}	—	August 30, 2005	Anderson Mesa	LONEOS	·	1.9 km	MPC · JPL
224183	2005 QZ_{174}	—	August 31, 2005	Socorro	LINEAR	·	2.1 km	MPC · JPL
224184	2005 QL_{176}	—	August 31, 2005	Kitt Peak	Spacewatch	MAS	1.3 km	MPC · JPL
224185	2005 QW_{177}	—	August 31, 2005	Kitt Peak	Spacewatch	MAS	780 m	MPC · JPL
224186	2005 QS_{178}	—	August 29, 2005	Socorro	LINEAR	MAS	1.0 km	MPC · JPL
224187	2005 QD_{183}	—	August 30, 2005	Kitt Peak	Spacewatch	·	1.5 km	MPC · JPL
224188	2005 RL_{6}	—	September 7, 2005	Altschwendt	Altschwendt	·	1.4 km	MPC · JPL
224189	2005 RB_{7}	—	September 6, 2005	Anderson Mesa	LONEOS	·	1.4 km	MPC · JPL
224190	2005 RC_{7}	—	September 6, 2005	Anderson Mesa	LONEOS	·	2.8 km	MPC · JPL
224191	2005 RB_{8}	—	September 8, 2005	Socorro	LINEAR	MAS	1.1 km	MPC · JPL
224192	2005 RO_{9}	—	September 9, 2005	Socorro	LINEAR	·	1.7 km	MPC · JPL
224193	2005 RJ_{10}	—	September 8, 2005	Socorro	LINEAR	·	1.3 km	MPC · JPL
224194	2005 RL_{13}	—	September 1, 2005	Palomar	NEAT	·	1.8 km	MPC · JPL
224195	2005 RR_{16}	—	September 1, 2005	Palomar	NEAT	V	1.1 km	MPC · JPL
224196	2005 RM_{21}	—	September 6, 2005	Anderson Mesa	LONEOS	·	2.0 km	MPC · JPL
224197	2005 RY_{22}	—	September 6, 2005	Anderson Mesa	LONEOS	MAS	1.3 km	MPC · JPL
224198	2005 RD_{23}	—	September 8, 2005	Socorro	LINEAR	·	2.8 km	MPC · JPL
224199	2005 RS_{25}	—	September 11, 2005	Socorro	LINEAR	PHO	1.8 km	MPC · JPL
224200	2005 RK_{26}	—	September 6, 2005	Socorro	LINEAR	NYS	1.2 km	MPC · JPL

== 224201–224300 ==
back to top

Designation			Discovery			Properties		Ref
Permanent	Provisional	Named after	Date	Site	Discoverer(s)	Category	Diam.	Ref
224201	2005 RL_{28}	—	September 12, 2005	Vail-Jarnac	Jarnac	·	1.5 km	MPC · JPL
224202	2005 RD_{29}	—	September 12, 2005	Haleakala	NEAT	·	2.0 km	MPC · JPL
224203	2005 RV_{39}	—	September 13, 2005	Anderson Mesa	LONEOS	·	4.2 km	MPC · JPL
224204	2005 RP_{44}	—	September 1, 2005	Kitt Peak	Spacewatch	MAS	680 m	MPC · JPL
224205	2005 RL_{48}	—	September 5, 2005	Catalina	CSS	·	1.5 km	MPC · JPL
224206 Pietchisson	2005 SY	Pietchisson	September 21, 2005	Vicques	M. Ory	·	1.7 km	MPC · JPL
224207	2005 ST_{12}	—	September 24, 2005	Kitt Peak	Spacewatch	·	1.6 km	MPC · JPL
224208	2005 SG_{16}	—	September 26, 2005	Kitt Peak	Spacewatch	·	1.8 km	MPC · JPL
224209	2005 SR_{16}	—	September 26, 2005	Kitt Peak	Spacewatch	·	2.2 km	MPC · JPL
224210	2005 SQ_{20}	—	September 24, 2005	Kitt Peak	Spacewatch	AEO	1.8 km	MPC · JPL
224211	2005 SX_{21}	—	September 28, 2005	Great Shefford	Birtwhistle, P.	·	1.8 km	MPC · JPL
224212	2005 SJ_{23}	—	September 23, 2005	Catalina	CSS	MAS ·	1.2 km	MPC · JPL
224213	2005 ST_{23}	—	September 23, 2005	Catalina	CSS	·	1.6 km	MPC · JPL
224214	2005 SS_{32}	—	September 23, 2005	Kitt Peak	Spacewatch	·	1.2 km	MPC · JPL
224215	2005 SV_{32}	—	September 23, 2005	Kitt Peak	Spacewatch	·	1.2 km	MPC · JPL
224216	2005 SY_{35}	—	September 23, 2005	Kitt Peak	Spacewatch	·	1.5 km	MPC · JPL
224217	2005 SQ_{36}	—	September 24, 2005	Kitt Peak	Spacewatch	·	1.4 km	MPC · JPL
224218	2005 SY_{37}	—	September 24, 2005	Kitt Peak	Spacewatch	·	2.0 km	MPC · JPL
224219	2005 SQ_{38}	—	September 24, 2005	Kitt Peak	Spacewatch	MAS	790 m	MPC · JPL
224220	2005 SL_{46}	—	September 24, 2005	Kitt Peak	Spacewatch	·	1.3 km	MPC · JPL
224221	2005 SL_{52}	—	September 25, 2005	Kitt Peak	Spacewatch	MAS	890 m	MPC · JPL
224222	2005 ST_{52}	—	September 25, 2005	Kitt Peak	Spacewatch	MAS	990 m	MPC · JPL
224223	2005 SJ_{53}	—	September 25, 2005	Catalina	CSS	·	1.5 km	MPC · JPL
224224	2005 SZ_{54}	—	September 25, 2005	Kitt Peak	Spacewatch	·	1.5 km	MPC · JPL
224225	2005 SY_{59}	—	September 26, 2005	Kitt Peak	Spacewatch	MAS	880 m	MPC · JPL
224226	2005 SA_{61}	—	September 26, 2005	Kitt Peak	Spacewatch	·	1.7 km	MPC · JPL
224227	2005 SJ_{61}	—	September 26, 2005	Kitt Peak	Spacewatch	(5)	1.4 km	MPC · JPL
224228	2005 SM_{65}	—	September 26, 2005	Palomar	NEAT	·	1.9 km	MPC · JPL
224229	2005 SH_{66}	—	September 26, 2005	Palomar	NEAT	V	930 m	MPC · JPL
224230	2005 SO_{69}	—	September 27, 2005	Kitt Peak	Spacewatch	·	1.7 km	MPC · JPL
224231	2005 SM_{72}	—	September 23, 2005	Catalina	CSS	·	1.3 km	MPC · JPL
224232	2005 SK_{80}	—	September 24, 2005	Kitt Peak	Spacewatch	·	1.3 km	MPC · JPL
224233	2005 SL_{84}	—	September 24, 2005	Kitt Peak	Spacewatch	·	1.4 km	MPC · JPL
224234	2005 SO_{86}	—	September 24, 2005	Kitt Peak	Spacewatch	NYS	1.4 km	MPC · JPL
224235	2005 SY_{89}	—	September 24, 2005	Kitt Peak	Spacewatch	(5)	1.5 km	MPC · JPL
224236	2005 SA_{94}	—	September 25, 2005	Kitt Peak	Spacewatch	NYS	1.2 km	MPC · JPL
224237	2005 SB_{99}	—	September 25, 2005	Kitt Peak	Spacewatch	·	3.0 km	MPC · JPL
224238	2005 SW_{105}	—	September 25, 2005	Palomar	NEAT	JUN	1.3 km	MPC · JPL
224239	2005 SU_{107}	—	September 26, 2005	Kitt Peak	Spacewatch	·	2.3 km	MPC · JPL
224240	2005 SY_{110}	—	September 26, 2005	Kitt Peak	Spacewatch	NYS	1.4 km	MPC · JPL
224241	2005 SX_{116}	—	September 28, 2005	Palomar	NEAT	·	1.9 km	MPC · JPL
224242	2005 SR_{119}	—	September 29, 2005	Kitt Peak	Spacewatch	NYS	1.6 km	MPC · JPL
224243	2005 ST_{126}	—	September 29, 2005	Mount Lemmon	Mount Lemmon Survey	·	1.6 km	MPC · JPL
224244	2005 SY_{126}	—	September 29, 2005	Mount Lemmon	Mount Lemmon Survey	·	1.6 km	MPC · JPL
224245	2005 SN_{129}	—	September 29, 2005	Mount Lemmon	Mount Lemmon Survey	·	1.3 km	MPC · JPL
224246	2005 SJ_{155}	—	September 26, 2005	Socorro	LINEAR	V	1.2 km	MPC · JPL
224247	2005 SV_{165}	—	September 28, 2005	Palomar	NEAT	·	1.7 km	MPC · JPL
224248	2005 SM_{172}	—	September 29, 2005	Anderson Mesa	LONEOS	·	2.5 km	MPC · JPL
224249	2005 SD_{185}	—	September 29, 2005	Kitt Peak	Spacewatch	·	1.4 km	MPC · JPL
224250	2005 SP_{191}	—	September 29, 2005	Mount Lemmon	Mount Lemmon Survey	·	2.0 km	MPC · JPL
224251	2005 SQ_{191}	—	September 29, 2005	Mount Lemmon	Mount Lemmon Survey	MAS	840 m	MPC · JPL
224252	2005 SG_{193}	—	September 29, 2005	Catalina	CSS	·	3.2 km	MPC · JPL
224253	2005 SK_{194}	—	September 29, 2005	Siding Spring	SSS	·	2.5 km	MPC · JPL
224254	2005 SP_{198}	—	September 30, 2005	Mount Lemmon	Mount Lemmon Survey	·	1.3 km	MPC · JPL
224255	2005 SV_{213}	—	September 30, 2005	Anderson Mesa	LONEOS	·	1.7 km	MPC · JPL
224256	2005 SB_{217}	—	September 30, 2005	Palomar	NEAT	·	1.8 km	MPC · JPL
224257	2005 SR_{224}	—	September 29, 2005	Mount Lemmon	Mount Lemmon Survey	·	1.1 km	MPC · JPL
224258	2005 SK_{225}	—	September 29, 2005	Mount Lemmon	Mount Lemmon Survey	·	2.1 km	MPC · JPL
224259	2005 SE_{246}	—	September 30, 2005	Mount Lemmon	Mount Lemmon Survey	·	1.9 km	MPC · JPL
224260	2005 SD_{247}	—	September 30, 2005	Kitt Peak	Spacewatch	·	1.9 km	MPC · JPL
224261	2005 SR_{248}	—	September 30, 2005	Kitt Peak	Spacewatch	·	1.4 km	MPC · JPL
224262	2005 SE_{250}	—	September 23, 2005	Catalina	CSS	V	1.1 km	MPC · JPL
224263	2005 SY_{253}	—	September 22, 2005	Palomar	NEAT	·	1.5 km	MPC · JPL
224264	2005 SH_{254}	—	September 22, 2005	Palomar	NEAT	·	1.8 km	MPC · JPL
224265	2005 SO_{255}	—	September 22, 2005	Palomar	NEAT	·	2.0 km	MPC · JPL
224266	2005 SH_{266}	—	September 29, 2005	Anderson Mesa	LONEOS	·	1.8 km	MPC · JPL
224267	2005 SP_{279}	—	September 23, 2005	Kitt Peak	Spacewatch	·	1.7 km	MPC · JPL
224268	2005 ST_{281}	—	September 23, 2005	Kitt Peak	Spacewatch	·	1.4 km	MPC · JPL
224269	2005 TV	—	October 1, 2005	Catalina	CSS	PHO	1.2 km	MPC · JPL
224270	2005 TP_{30}	—	October 1, 2005	Mount Lemmon	Mount Lemmon Survey	·	1.5 km	MPC · JPL
224271	2005 TT_{37}	—	October 1, 2005	Mount Lemmon	Mount Lemmon Survey	·	1.5 km	MPC · JPL
224272	2005 TD_{43}	—	October 5, 2005	Kitt Peak	Spacewatch	·	1.4 km	MPC · JPL
224273	2005 TW_{43}	—	October 5, 2005	Socorro	LINEAR	·	1.5 km	MPC · JPL
224274	2005 TK_{51}	—	October 11, 2005	Bergisch Gladbach	W. Bickel	·	1.8 km	MPC · JPL
224275	2005 TU_{51}	—	October 12, 2005	Bergisch Gladbach	W. Bickel	EUN	1.8 km	MPC · JPL
224276	2005 TC_{52}	—	October 3, 2005	Socorro	LINEAR	(2076)	1.4 km	MPC · JPL
224277	2005 TU_{52}	—	October 14, 2005	Junk Bond	D. Healy	·	1.8 km	MPC · JPL
224278	2005 TH_{53}	—	October 8, 2005	Moletai	K. Černis, Zdanavicius, J.	·	1.4 km	MPC · JPL
224279	2005 TL_{56}	—	October 1, 2005	Mount Lemmon	Mount Lemmon Survey	·	2.0 km	MPC · JPL
224280	2005 TZ_{56}	—	October 1, 2005	Mount Lemmon	Mount Lemmon Survey	·	1.5 km	MPC · JPL
224281	2005 TT_{62}	—	October 4, 2005	Mount Lemmon	Mount Lemmon Survey	·	1.7 km	MPC · JPL
224282	2005 TH_{69}	—	October 6, 2005	Mount Lemmon	Mount Lemmon Survey	·	1.3 km	MPC · JPL
224283	2005 TU_{71}	—	October 3, 2005	Catalina	CSS	·	2.0 km	MPC · JPL
224284	2005 TZ_{77}	—	October 6, 2005	Anderson Mesa	LONEOS	·	3.6 km	MPC · JPL
224285	2005 TT_{82}	—	October 3, 2005	Socorro	LINEAR	·	2.9 km	MPC · JPL
224286	2005 TW_{94}	—	October 6, 2005	Anderson Mesa	LONEOS	·	1.9 km	MPC · JPL
224287	2005 TE_{98}	—	October 6, 2005	Kitt Peak	Spacewatch	·	1.5 km	MPC · JPL
224288	2005 TD_{100}	—	October 7, 2005	Kitt Peak	Spacewatch	·	1.2 km	MPC · JPL
224289	2005 TA_{101}	—	October 7, 2005	Catalina	CSS	MAS	1.1 km	MPC · JPL
224290	2005 TM_{107}	—	October 5, 2005	Kitt Peak	Spacewatch	·	1.7 km	MPC · JPL
224291	2005 TU_{109}	—	October 7, 2005	Kitt Peak	Spacewatch	·	1.8 km	MPC · JPL
224292	2005 TC_{126}	—	October 7, 2005	Kitt Peak	Spacewatch	·	930 m	MPC · JPL
224293	2005 TU_{126}	—	October 7, 2005	Kitt Peak	Spacewatch	·	1.2 km	MPC · JPL
224294	2005 TW_{126}	—	October 7, 2005	Kitt Peak	Spacewatch	·	1.5 km	MPC · JPL
224295	2005 TG_{127}	—	October 7, 2005	Kitt Peak	Spacewatch	MAS	940 m	MPC · JPL
224296	2005 TC_{142}	—	October 8, 2005	Kitt Peak	Spacewatch	·	1.6 km	MPC · JPL
224297	2005 TG_{152}	—	October 11, 2005	Nogales	Tenagra II	·	1.5 km	MPC · JPL
224298	2005 TV_{160}	—	October 9, 2005	Kitt Peak	Spacewatch	·	1.6 km	MPC · JPL
224299	2005 TA_{171}	—	October 8, 2005	Socorro	LINEAR	·	1.1 km	MPC · JPL
224300	2005 TR_{182}	—	October 5, 2005	Catalina	CSS	·	1.9 km	MPC · JPL

== 224301–224400 ==
back to top

Designation			Discovery			Properties		Ref
Permanent	Provisional	Named after	Date	Site	Discoverer(s)	Category	Diam.	Ref
224301	2005 TN_{184}	—	October 1, 2005	Mount Lemmon	Mount Lemmon Survey	·	1.7 km	MPC · JPL
224302	2005 TM_{190}	—	October 10, 2005	Anderson Mesa	LONEOS	·	2.8 km	MPC · JPL
224303	2005 TU_{190}	—	October 1, 2005	Mount Lemmon	Mount Lemmon Survey	·	1.6 km	MPC · JPL
224304	2005 TL_{192}	—	October 10, 2005	Catalina	CSS	EUN	1.1 km	MPC · JPL
224305	2005 UW_{4}	—	October 27, 2005	Modra	Gajdoš, S., Világi, J.	·	2.1 km	MPC · JPL
224306	2005 UV_{8}	—	October 20, 2005	Palomar	NEAT	·	2.3 km	MPC · JPL
224307	2005 UA_{12}	—	October 22, 2005	Kitt Peak	Spacewatch	·	2.2 km	MPC · JPL
224308	2005 UE_{12}	—	October 22, 2005	Kitt Peak	Spacewatch	·	1.8 km	MPC · JPL
224309	2005 UP_{16}	—	October 22, 2005	Kitt Peak	Spacewatch	·	1.9 km	MPC · JPL
224310	2005 UW_{19}	—	October 22, 2005	Kitt Peak	Spacewatch	·	2.9 km	MPC · JPL
224311	2005 UE_{22}	—	October 23, 2005	Kitt Peak	Spacewatch	·	960 m	MPC · JPL
224312	2005 UL_{24}	—	October 23, 2005	Kitt Peak	Spacewatch	·	1.1 km	MPC · JPL
224313	2005 UT_{24}	—	October 23, 2005	Kitt Peak	Spacewatch	·	1.9 km	MPC · JPL
224314	2005 UQ_{25}	—	October 23, 2005	Kitt Peak	Spacewatch	·	2.3 km	MPC · JPL
224315	2005 UH_{28}	—	October 23, 2005	Kitt Peak	Spacewatch	·	2.1 km	MPC · JPL
224316	2005 UR_{29}	—	October 23, 2005	Catalina	CSS	JUN	1.6 km	MPC · JPL
224317	2005 UL_{30}	—	October 23, 2005	Catalina	CSS	·	2.1 km	MPC · JPL
224318	2005 UQ_{34}	—	October 24, 2005	Kitt Peak	Spacewatch	·	2.6 km	MPC · JPL
224319	2005 UZ_{36}	—	October 24, 2005	Kitt Peak	Spacewatch	·	1.5 km	MPC · JPL
224320	2005 UT_{38}	—	October 24, 2005	Kitt Peak	Spacewatch	·	2.1 km	MPC · JPL
224321	2005 UQ_{39}	—	October 24, 2005	Kitt Peak	Spacewatch	·	2.1 km	MPC · JPL
224322	2005 UY_{39}	—	October 24, 2005	Kitt Peak	Spacewatch	·	3.0 km	MPC · JPL
224323	2005 UK_{43}	—	October 22, 2005	Kitt Peak	Spacewatch	HNS	1.5 km	MPC · JPL
224324	2005 UG_{46}	—	October 22, 2005	Kitt Peak	Spacewatch	·	1.5 km	MPC · JPL
224325	2005 UJ_{46}	—	October 22, 2005	Kitt Peak	Spacewatch	·	1.6 km	MPC · JPL
224326	2005 UN_{46}	—	October 22, 2005	Kitt Peak	Spacewatch	·	2.6 km	MPC · JPL
224327	2005 UH_{50}	—	October 23, 2005	Catalina	CSS	·	1.5 km	MPC · JPL
224328	2005 UL_{51}	—	October 23, 2005	Catalina	CSS	·	2.5 km	MPC · JPL
224329	2005 UZ_{52}	—	October 23, 2005	Catalina	CSS	(5)	1.4 km	MPC · JPL
224330	2005 UC_{56}	—	October 23, 2005	Catalina	CSS	ADE	3.2 km	MPC · JPL
224331	2005 UY_{58}	—	October 24, 2005	Kitt Peak	Spacewatch	·	2.1 km	MPC · JPL
224332	2005 UW_{59}	—	October 25, 2005	Anderson Mesa	LONEOS	MAR ·	1.9 km	MPC · JPL
224333	2005 UK_{60}	—	October 25, 2005	Anderson Mesa	LONEOS	·	1.6 km	MPC · JPL
224334	2005 UX_{60}	—	October 25, 2005	Mount Lemmon	Mount Lemmon Survey	·	2.1 km	MPC · JPL
224335	2005 UL_{62}	—	October 25, 2005	Mount Lemmon	Mount Lemmon Survey	·	1.6 km	MPC · JPL
224336	2005 UQ_{63}	—	October 25, 2005	Mount Lemmon	Mount Lemmon Survey	·	1.7 km	MPC · JPL
224337	2005 UN_{67}	—	October 22, 2005	Palomar	NEAT	NYS	1.6 km	MPC · JPL
224338	2005 UO_{67}	—	October 22, 2005	Palomar	NEAT	(5)	1.4 km	MPC · JPL
224339	2005 UP_{69}	—	October 23, 2005	Palomar	NEAT	·	2.6 km	MPC · JPL
224340	2005 UR_{73}	—	October 23, 2005	Palomar	NEAT	EUN	2.0 km	MPC · JPL
224341	2005 UV_{76}	—	October 24, 2005	Palomar	NEAT	EUN	1.8 km	MPC · JPL
224342	2005 UW_{76}	—	October 24, 2005	Palomar	NEAT	·	2.5 km	MPC · JPL
224343	2005 UU_{79}	—	October 25, 2005	Mount Lemmon	Mount Lemmon Survey	EUN	1.6 km	MPC · JPL
224344	2005 UQ_{90}	—	October 22, 2005	Kitt Peak	Spacewatch	·	2.6 km	MPC · JPL
224345	2005 UT_{90}	—	October 22, 2005	Kitt Peak	Spacewatch	·	2.6 km	MPC · JPL
224346	2005 UF_{103}	—	October 22, 2005	Kitt Peak	Spacewatch	·	2.1 km	MPC · JPL
224347	2005 UO_{103}	—	October 22, 2005	Kitt Peak	Spacewatch	·	1.3 km	MPC · JPL
224348	2005 US_{104}	—	October 22, 2005	Kitt Peak	Spacewatch	·	2.1 km	MPC · JPL
224349	2005 UG_{105}	—	October 22, 2005	Kitt Peak	Spacewatch	(29841)	2.1 km	MPC · JPL
224350	2005 UA_{107}	—	October 22, 2005	Kitt Peak	Spacewatch	MIS	3.4 km	MPC · JPL
224351	2005 UN_{109}	—	October 22, 2005	Kitt Peak	Spacewatch	·	2.1 km	MPC · JPL
224352	2005 UB_{111}	—	October 22, 2005	Kitt Peak	Spacewatch	·	1.2 km	MPC · JPL
224353	2005 UD_{111}	—	October 22, 2005	Kitt Peak	Spacewatch	·	2.0 km	MPC · JPL
224354	2005 UM_{111}	—	October 22, 2005	Kitt Peak	Spacewatch	(5)	2.1 km	MPC · JPL
224355	2005 UH_{112}	—	October 22, 2005	Kitt Peak	Spacewatch	·	2.0 km	MPC · JPL
224356	2005 UJ_{112}	—	October 22, 2005	Kitt Peak	Spacewatch	·	3.1 km	MPC · JPL
224357	2005 UP_{112}	—	October 22, 2005	Kitt Peak	Spacewatch	·	1.5 km	MPC · JPL
224358	2005 UE_{116}	—	October 23, 2005	Catalina	CSS	·	1.6 km	MPC · JPL
224359	2005 UX_{117}	—	October 24, 2005	Kitt Peak	Spacewatch	MIS	3.0 km	MPC · JPL
224360	2005 UK_{122}	—	October 24, 2005	Kitt Peak	Spacewatch	·	1.6 km	MPC · JPL
224361	2005 UX_{128}	—	October 24, 2005	Kitt Peak	Spacewatch	NYS	2.0 km	MPC · JPL
224362	2005 UT_{130}	—	October 24, 2005	Kitt Peak	Spacewatch	(5)	1.5 km	MPC · JPL
224363	2005 UW_{134}	—	October 25, 2005	Mount Lemmon	Mount Lemmon Survey	·	1.1 km	MPC · JPL
224364	2005 UX_{135}	—	October 25, 2005	Mount Lemmon	Mount Lemmon Survey	·	1.3 km	MPC · JPL
224365	2005 UV_{141}	—	October 25, 2005	Catalina	CSS	·	2.8 km	MPC · JPL
224366	2005 UN_{151}	—	October 26, 2005	Kitt Peak	Spacewatch	·	1.8 km	MPC · JPL
224367	2005 UK_{152}	—	October 26, 2005	Kitt Peak	Spacewatch	·	2.1 km	MPC · JPL
224368	2005 US_{154}	—	October 26, 2005	Kitt Peak	Spacewatch	·	1.8 km	MPC · JPL
224369	2005 UE_{155}	—	October 26, 2005	Kitt Peak	Spacewatch	·	2.1 km	MPC · JPL
224370	2005 UX_{159}	—	October 22, 2005	Catalina	CSS	·	2.1 km	MPC · JPL
224371	2005 UD_{164}	—	October 24, 2005	Kitt Peak	Spacewatch	·	1.9 km	MPC · JPL
224372	2005 UQ_{168}	—	October 24, 2005	Kitt Peak	Spacewatch	·	1.2 km	MPC · JPL
224373	2005 UY_{173}	—	October 24, 2005	Kitt Peak	Spacewatch	·	1.4 km	MPC · JPL
224374	2005 UF_{178}	—	October 24, 2005	Kitt Peak	Spacewatch	(5)	2.6 km	MPC · JPL
224375	2005 UU_{180}	—	October 24, 2005	Kitt Peak	Spacewatch	·	2.7 km	MPC · JPL
224376	2005 UH_{181}	—	October 24, 2005	Kitt Peak	Spacewatch	·	2.0 km	MPC · JPL
224377	2005 UP_{182}	—	October 24, 2005	Kitt Peak	Spacewatch	·	2.7 km	MPC · JPL
224378	2005 UD_{183}	—	October 24, 2005	Kitt Peak	Spacewatch	(17392)	1.7 km	MPC · JPL
224379	2005 UZ_{186}	—	October 26, 2005	Anderson Mesa	LONEOS	(5)	1.8 km	MPC · JPL
224380	2005 UH_{187}	—	October 26, 2005	Kitt Peak	Spacewatch	·	1.1 km	MPC · JPL
224381	2005 UW_{193}	—	October 22, 2005	Kitt Peak	Spacewatch	(5)	1.4 km	MPC · JPL
224382	2005 UB_{194}	—	October 22, 2005	Kitt Peak	Spacewatch	·	1.5 km	MPC · JPL
224383	2005 UY_{194}	—	October 22, 2005	Kitt Peak	Spacewatch	·	2.2 km	MPC · JPL
224384	2005 UH_{197}	—	October 24, 2005	Kitt Peak	Spacewatch	·	3.4 km	MPC · JPL
224385	2005 UY_{199}	—	October 25, 2005	Kitt Peak	Spacewatch	·	1.9 km	MPC · JPL
224386	2005 UP_{200}	—	October 25, 2005	Kitt Peak	Spacewatch	·	2.8 km	MPC · JPL
224387	2005 UY_{200}	—	October 25, 2005	Kitt Peak	Spacewatch	·	1.7 km	MPC · JPL
224388	2005 UJ_{201}	—	October 25, 2005	Kitt Peak	Spacewatch	·	3.2 km	MPC · JPL
224389	2005 UX_{203}	—	October 25, 2005	Mount Lemmon	Mount Lemmon Survey	·	1.9 km	MPC · JPL
224390	2005 UL_{205}	—	October 26, 2005	Kitt Peak	Spacewatch	WIT	1.7 km	MPC · JPL
224391	2005 UA_{206}	—	October 26, 2005	Kitt Peak	Spacewatch	·	1.4 km	MPC · JPL
224392	2005 UB_{207}	—	October 27, 2005	Kitt Peak	Spacewatch	·	1.7 km	MPC · JPL
224393	2005 UQ_{232}	—	October 25, 2005	Mount Lemmon	Mount Lemmon Survey	·	1.3 km	MPC · JPL
224394	2005 UH_{233}	—	October 25, 2005	Kitt Peak	Spacewatch	·	1.5 km	MPC · JPL
224395	2005 UJ_{235}	—	October 25, 2005	Kitt Peak	Spacewatch	·	1.9 km	MPC · JPL
224396	2005 UQ_{253}	—	October 27, 2005	Mount Lemmon	Mount Lemmon Survey	·	1.6 km	MPC · JPL
224397	2005 UE_{259}	—	October 25, 2005	Kitt Peak	Spacewatch	·	2.2 km	MPC · JPL
224398	2005 UP_{260}	—	October 25, 2005	Kitt Peak	Spacewatch	·	2.4 km	MPC · JPL
224399	2005 UA_{265}	—	October 27, 2005	Kitt Peak	Spacewatch	·	1.7 km	MPC · JPL
224400	2005 UM_{276}	—	October 24, 2005	Kitt Peak	Spacewatch	·	2.0 km	MPC · JPL

== 224401–224500 ==
back to top

Designation			Discovery			Properties		Ref
Permanent	Provisional	Named after	Date	Site	Discoverer(s)	Category	Diam.	Ref
224401	2005 UP_{279}	—	October 24, 2005	Kitt Peak	Spacewatch	·	1.1 km	MPC · JPL
224402	2005 UH_{294}	—	October 26, 2005	Kitt Peak	Spacewatch	·	1.9 km	MPC · JPL
224403	2005 UF_{305}	—	October 26, 2005	Kitt Peak	Spacewatch	·	1.7 km	MPC · JPL
224404	2005 UZ_{310}	—	October 29, 2005	Mount Lemmon	Mount Lemmon Survey	·	1.3 km	MPC · JPL
224405	2005 UP_{312}	—	October 29, 2005	Catalina	CSS	·	1.9 km	MPC · JPL
224406	2005 UM_{314}	—	October 28, 2005	Catalina	CSS	·	2.3 km	MPC · JPL
224407	2005 UC_{316}	—	October 25, 2005	Catalina	CSS	·	1.4 km	MPC · JPL
224408	2005 UT_{322}	—	October 28, 2005	Catalina	CSS	·	2.0 km	MPC · JPL
224409	2005 UR_{323}	—	October 28, 2005	Mount Lemmon	Mount Lemmon Survey	·	2.3 km	MPC · JPL
224410	2005 UB_{333}	—	October 29, 2005	Catalina	CSS	·	2.8 km	MPC · JPL
224411	2005 UX_{333}	—	October 29, 2005	Mount Lemmon	Mount Lemmon Survey	·	1.7 km	MPC · JPL
224412	2005 UB_{334}	—	October 29, 2005	Mount Lemmon	Mount Lemmon Survey	·	1.9 km	MPC · JPL
224413	2005 UJ_{345}	—	October 29, 2005	Mount Lemmon	Mount Lemmon Survey	·	2.5 km	MPC · JPL
224414	2005 UJ_{348}	—	October 31, 2005	Kitt Peak	Spacewatch	·	3.4 km	MPC · JPL
224415	2005 UB_{349}	—	October 25, 2005	Catalina	CSS	HNS	1.9 km	MPC · JPL
224416	2005 UY_{355}	—	October 29, 2005	Mount Lemmon	Mount Lemmon Survey	·	2.8 km	MPC · JPL
224417	2005 UL_{358}	—	October 24, 2005	Kitt Peak	Spacewatch	·	1.5 km	MPC · JPL
224418	2005 UC_{360}	—	October 25, 2005	Mount Lemmon	Mount Lemmon Survey	·	1.4 km	MPC · JPL
224419	2005 UA_{389}	—	October 28, 2005	Mount Lemmon	Mount Lemmon Survey	·	1.3 km	MPC · JPL
224420	2005 UA_{396}	—	October 30, 2005	Kitt Peak	Spacewatch	GEF	1.3 km	MPC · JPL
224421	2005 UD_{397}	—	October 27, 2005	Catalina	CSS	·	2.6 km	MPC · JPL
224422	2005 UT_{398}	—	October 30, 2005	Palomar	NEAT	·	2.5 km	MPC · JPL
224423	2005 UA_{403}	—	October 28, 2005	Kitt Peak	Spacewatch	·	2.5 km	MPC · JPL
224424	2005 UC_{404}	—	October 29, 2005	Kitt Peak	Spacewatch	·	2.4 km	MPC · JPL
224425	2005 UD_{412}	—	October 31, 2005	Mount Lemmon	Mount Lemmon Survey	·	2.2 km	MPC · JPL
224426	2005 UJ_{416}	—	October 25, 2005	Kitt Peak	Spacewatch	(5)	1.9 km	MPC · JPL
224427	2005 US_{416}	—	October 25, 2005	Kitt Peak	Spacewatch	(5)	1.6 km	MPC · JPL
224428	2005 UC_{418}	—	October 25, 2005	Kitt Peak	Spacewatch	·	1.8 km	MPC · JPL
224429	2005 UL_{433}	—	October 28, 2005	Kitt Peak	Spacewatch	·	1.4 km	MPC · JPL
224430	2005 UV_{443}	—	October 30, 2005	Socorro	LINEAR	·	4.5 km	MPC · JPL
224431	2005 US_{445}	—	October 31, 2005	Mount Lemmon	Mount Lemmon Survey	·	2.1 km	MPC · JPL
224432	2005 UH_{456}	—	October 30, 2005	Palomar	NEAT	·	2.4 km	MPC · JPL
224433	2005 UV_{461}	—	October 29, 2005	Kitt Peak	Spacewatch	·	5.4 km	MPC · JPL
224434	2005 UJ_{465}	—	October 30, 2005	Kitt Peak	Spacewatch	·	4.0 km	MPC · JPL
224435	2005 UK_{472}	—	October 30, 2005	Kitt Peak	Spacewatch	(12739)	2.6 km	MPC · JPL
224436	2005 UQ_{472}	—	October 30, 2005	Kitt Peak	Spacewatch	·	1.9 km	MPC · JPL
224437	2005 UZ_{472}	—	October 30, 2005	Mount Lemmon	Mount Lemmon Survey	·	2.0 km	MPC · JPL
224438	2005 UU_{477}	—	October 26, 2005	Kitt Peak	Spacewatch	KON	3.1 km	MPC · JPL
224439	2005 UK_{478}	—	October 27, 2005	Anderson Mesa	LONEOS	·	1.9 km	MPC · JPL
224440	2005 UV_{483}	—	October 22, 2005	Palomar	NEAT	·	1.1 km	MPC · JPL
224441	2005 UO_{484}	—	October 22, 2005	Palomar	NEAT	·	2.2 km	MPC · JPL
224442	2005 UB_{488}	—	October 23, 2005	Catalina	CSS	·	3.2 km	MPC · JPL
224443	2005 UT_{492}	—	October 25, 2005	Catalina	CSS	·	2.3 km	MPC · JPL
224444	2005 UY_{494}	—	October 25, 2005	Catalina	CSS	·	1.9 km	MPC · JPL
224445	2005 UY_{497}	—	October 27, 2005	Anderson Mesa	LONEOS	·	2.2 km	MPC · JPL
224446	2005 UV_{510}	—	October 25, 2005	Mount Lemmon	Mount Lemmon Survey	·	1.8 km	MPC · JPL
224447	2005 UP_{513}	—	October 22, 2005	Kitt Peak	Spacewatch	AGN	1.4 km	MPC · JPL
224448	2005 UE_{516}	—	October 25, 2005	Mount Lemmon	Mount Lemmon Survey	·	2.3 km	MPC · JPL
224449	2005 VG_{6}	—	November 8, 2005	Socorro	LINEAR	WIT	1.6 km	MPC · JPL
224450	2005 VW_{9}	—	November 2, 2005	Socorro	LINEAR	·	1.6 km	MPC · JPL
224451	2005 VN_{15}	—	November 1, 2005	Catalina	CSS	ADE	3.1 km	MPC · JPL
224452	2005 VC_{17}	—	November 3, 2005	Catalina	CSS	EUN	1.9 km	MPC · JPL
224453	2005 VY_{24}	—	November 1, 2005	Socorro	LINEAR	EUN	2.0 km	MPC · JPL
224454	2005 VJ_{25}	—	November 2, 2005	Socorro	LINEAR	·	2.1 km	MPC · JPL
224455	2005 VR_{27}	—	November 3, 2005	Mount Lemmon	Mount Lemmon Survey	EUN	1.8 km	MPC · JPL
224456	2005 VA_{28}	—	November 3, 2005	Kitt Peak	Spacewatch	EOS	4.5 km	MPC · JPL
224457	2005 VU_{30}	—	November 4, 2005	Kitt Peak	Spacewatch	PAD	2.3 km	MPC · JPL
224458	2005 VT_{34}	—	November 3, 2005	Socorro	LINEAR	·	2.4 km	MPC · JPL
224459	2005 VM_{37}	—	November 3, 2005	Socorro	LINEAR	·	1.7 km	MPC · JPL
224460	2005 VU_{37}	—	November 3, 2005	Mount Lemmon	Mount Lemmon Survey	·	1.6 km	MPC · JPL
224461	2005 VY_{39}	—	November 4, 2005	Catalina	CSS	·	2.6 km	MPC · JPL
224462	2005 VT_{41}	—	November 1, 2005	Catalina	CSS	·	1.7 km	MPC · JPL
224463	2005 VW_{41}	—	November 2, 2005	Catalina	CSS	·	3.9 km	MPC · JPL
224464	2005 VP_{43}	—	November 1, 2005	Socorro	LINEAR	·	1.8 km	MPC · JPL
224465	2005 VE_{44}	—	November 3, 2005	Mount Lemmon	Mount Lemmon Survey	·	1.4 km	MPC · JPL
224466	2005 VH_{52}	—	November 3, 2005	Catalina	CSS	·	1.3 km	MPC · JPL
224467	2005 VL_{54}	—	November 4, 2005	Kitt Peak	Spacewatch	·	1.6 km	MPC · JPL
224468	2005 VE_{55}	—	November 4, 2005	Kitt Peak	Spacewatch	·	1.9 km	MPC · JPL
224469	2005 VX_{55}	—	November 4, 2005	Catalina	CSS	·	1.5 km	MPC · JPL
224470	2005 VA_{56}	—	November 4, 2005	Catalina	CSS	(5)	1.4 km	MPC · JPL
224471	2005 VS_{62}	—	November 1, 2005	Mount Lemmon	Mount Lemmon Survey	BRG	2.0 km	MPC · JPL
224472	2005 VQ_{69}	—	November 1, 2005	Mount Lemmon	Mount Lemmon Survey	·	3.6 km	MPC · JPL
224473	2005 VU_{71}	—	November 1, 2005	Mount Lemmon	Mount Lemmon Survey	EUN	2.4 km	MPC · JPL
224474	2005 VL_{73}	—	November 1, 2005	Mount Lemmon	Mount Lemmon Survey	·	3.3 km	MPC · JPL
224475	2005 VT_{73}	—	November 1, 2005	Mount Lemmon	Mount Lemmon Survey	·	2.1 km	MPC · JPL
224476	2005 VT_{74}	—	November 1, 2005	Mount Lemmon	Mount Lemmon Survey	·	1.9 km	MPC · JPL
224477	2005 VU_{74}	—	November 1, 2005	Mount Lemmon	Mount Lemmon Survey	NEM	3.4 km	MPC · JPL
224478	2005 VN_{75}	—	November 1, 2005	Socorro	LINEAR	(1547)	1.7 km	MPC · JPL
224479	2005 VA_{83}	—	November 3, 2005	Mount Lemmon	Mount Lemmon Survey	·	2.2 km	MPC · JPL
224480	2005 VH_{86}	—	November 4, 2005	Mount Lemmon	Mount Lemmon Survey	·	2.0 km	MPC · JPL
224481	2005 VZ_{86}	—	November 5, 2005	Kitt Peak	Spacewatch	·	4.6 km	MPC · JPL
224482	2005 VN_{91}	—	November 6, 2005	Socorro	LINEAR	·	1.8 km	MPC · JPL
224483	2005 VQ_{98}	—	November 10, 2005	Catalina	CSS	EUN	2.1 km	MPC · JPL
224484	2005 VB_{100}	—	November 1, 2005	Kitt Peak	Spacewatch	·	1.4 km	MPC · JPL
224485	2005 VP_{106}	—	November 5, 2005	Kitt Peak	Spacewatch	·	2.4 km	MPC · JPL
224486	2005 VW_{116}	—	November 11, 2005	Kitt Peak	Spacewatch	·	1.7 km	MPC · JPL
224487	2005 VZ_{123}	—	November 1, 2005	Mount Lemmon	Mount Lemmon Survey	·	1.6 km	MPC · JPL
224488	2005 WQ_{1}	—	November 21, 2005	Socorro	LINEAR	·	3.3 km	MPC · JPL
224489	2005 WT_{2}	—	November 19, 2005	Palomar	NEAT	·	2.5 km	MPC · JPL
224490	2005 WK_{3}	—	November 20, 2005	Palomar	NEAT	·	2.7 km	MPC · JPL
224491	2005 WB_{7}	—	November 21, 2005	Catalina	CSS	·	2.1 km	MPC · JPL
224492	2005 WQ_{7}	—	November 21, 2005	Junk Bond	D. Healy	·	4.6 km	MPC · JPL
224493	2005 WS_{7}	—	November 21, 2005	Palomar	NEAT	(5)	1.8 km	MPC · JPL
224494	2005 WN_{9}	—	November 21, 2005	Kitt Peak	Spacewatch	·	1.9 km	MPC · JPL
224495	2005 WT_{16}	—	November 22, 2005	Kitt Peak	Spacewatch	·	2.1 km	MPC · JPL
224496	2005 WU_{17}	—	November 22, 2005	Kitt Peak	Spacewatch	·	1.6 km	MPC · JPL
224497	2005 WL_{20}	—	November 21, 2005	Kitt Peak	Spacewatch	·	2.2 km	MPC · JPL
224498	2005 WA_{21}	—	November 21, 2005	Kitt Peak	Spacewatch	(5)	1.8 km	MPC · JPL
224499	2005 WZ_{21}	—	November 21, 2005	Kitt Peak	Spacewatch	MRX	1.5 km	MPC · JPL
224500	2005 WB_{24}	—	November 21, 2005	Kitt Peak	Spacewatch	·	1.9 km	MPC · JPL

== 224501–224600 ==
back to top

Designation			Discovery			Properties		Ref
Permanent	Provisional	Named after	Date	Site	Discoverer(s)	Category	Diam.	Ref
224501	2005 WP_{27}	—	November 21, 2005	Kitt Peak	Spacewatch	·	2.7 km	MPC · JPL
224502	2005 WD_{28}	—	November 21, 2005	Kitt Peak	Spacewatch	(5)	1.4 km	MPC · JPL
224503	2005 WF_{28}	—	November 21, 2005	Kitt Peak	Spacewatch	·	2.0 km	MPC · JPL
224504	2005 WQ_{28}	—	November 21, 2005	Kitt Peak	Spacewatch	(5)	1.1 km	MPC · JPL
224505	2005 WQ_{29}	—	November 21, 2005	Kitt Peak	Spacewatch	·	2.4 km	MPC · JPL
224506	2005 WA_{32}	—	November 21, 2005	Kitt Peak	Spacewatch	·	2.5 km	MPC · JPL
224507	2005 WJ_{35}	—	November 22, 2005	Kitt Peak	Spacewatch	·	2.4 km	MPC · JPL
224508	2005 WL_{37}	—	November 22, 2005	Kitt Peak	Spacewatch	·	2.2 km	MPC · JPL
224509	2005 WU_{37}	—	November 22, 2005	Kitt Peak	Spacewatch	HOF	3.8 km	MPC · JPL
224510	2005 WW_{41}	—	November 21, 2005	Kitt Peak	Spacewatch	·	2.8 km	MPC · JPL
224511	2005 WE_{43}	—	November 21, 2005	Kitt Peak	Spacewatch	·	1.8 km	MPC · JPL
224512	2005 WT_{47}	—	November 25, 2005	Kitt Peak	Spacewatch	·	1.6 km	MPC · JPL
224513	2005 WS_{48}	—	November 25, 2005	Kitt Peak	Spacewatch	·	1.7 km	MPC · JPL
224514	2005 WK_{67}	—	November 22, 2005	Kitt Peak	Spacewatch	·	1.9 km	MPC · JPL
224515	2005 WT_{70}	—	November 26, 2005	Mount Lemmon	Mount Lemmon Survey	·	1.4 km	MPC · JPL
224516	2005 WD_{71}	—	November 21, 2005	Catalina	CSS	·	2.2 km	MPC · JPL
224517	2005 WG_{71}	—	November 21, 2005	Kitt Peak	Spacewatch	·	1.8 km	MPC · JPL
224518	2005 WT_{71}	—	November 21, 2005	Palomar	NEAT	·	2.3 km	MPC · JPL
224519	2005 WH_{72}	—	November 25, 2005	Palomar	NEAT	·	1.7 km	MPC · JPL
224520	2005 WO_{72}	—	November 25, 2005	Kitt Peak	Spacewatch	·	2.9 km	MPC · JPL
224521	2005 WY_{72}	—	November 25, 2005	Kitt Peak	Spacewatch	·	3.0 km	MPC · JPL
224522	2005 WS_{74}	—	November 28, 2005	Palomar	NEAT	EUN	2.2 km	MPC · JPL
224523	2005 WG_{77}	—	November 25, 2005	Kitt Peak	Spacewatch	MIS	2.5 km	MPC · JPL
224524	2005 WQ_{80}	—	November 26, 2005	Mount Lemmon	Mount Lemmon Survey	·	1.4 km	MPC · JPL
224525	2005 WU_{83}	—	November 26, 2005	Mount Lemmon	Mount Lemmon Survey	·	2.0 km	MPC · JPL
224526	2005 WC_{89}	—	November 25, 2005	Mount Lemmon	Mount Lemmon Survey	·	1.3 km	MPC · JPL
224527	2005 WC_{90}	—	November 26, 2005	Mount Lemmon	Mount Lemmon Survey	·	2.2 km	MPC · JPL
224528	2005 WS_{91}	—	November 28, 2005	Catalina	CSS	·	1.7 km	MPC · JPL
224529	2005 WP_{99}	—	November 28, 2005	Mount Lemmon	Mount Lemmon Survey	·	2.0 km	MPC · JPL
224530	2005 WJ_{101}	—	November 29, 2005	Mount Lemmon	Mount Lemmon Survey	·	2.4 km	MPC · JPL
224531	2005 WF_{105}	—	November 29, 2005	Catalina	CSS	EUN	3.0 km	MPC · JPL
224532	2005 WH_{105}	—	November 29, 2005	Catalina	CSS	·	2.1 km	MPC · JPL
224533	2005 WS_{105}	—	November 29, 2005	Catalina	CSS	·	3.0 km	MPC · JPL
224534	2005 WV_{110}	—	November 30, 2005	Kitt Peak	Spacewatch	·	2.0 km	MPC · JPL
224535	2005 WH_{114}	—	November 28, 2005	Socorro	LINEAR	·	2.4 km	MPC · JPL
224536	2005 WQ_{116}	—	November 30, 2005	Socorro	LINEAR	·	2.5 km	MPC · JPL
224537	2005 WK_{119}	—	November 28, 2005	Socorro	LINEAR	ADE	2.0 km	MPC · JPL
224538	2005 WB_{120}	—	November 29, 2005	Kitt Peak	Spacewatch	·	1.8 km	MPC · JPL
224539	2005 WN_{120}	—	November 29, 2005	Socorro	LINEAR	·	3.1 km	MPC · JPL
224540	2005 WX_{120}	—	November 30, 2005	Socorro	LINEAR	MIS	3.8 km	MPC · JPL
224541	2005 WQ_{123}	—	November 25, 2005	Mount Lemmon	Mount Lemmon Survey	·	1.6 km	MPC · JPL
224542	2005 WA_{131}	—	November 25, 2005	Mount Lemmon	Mount Lemmon Survey	·	2.5 km	MPC · JPL
224543	2005 WJ_{132}	—	November 25, 2005	Mount Lemmon	Mount Lemmon Survey	·	3.4 km	MPC · JPL
224544	2005 WD_{134}	—	November 25, 2005	Mount Lemmon	Mount Lemmon Survey	·	3.4 km	MPC · JPL
224545	2005 WM_{134}	—	November 25, 2005	Mount Lemmon	Mount Lemmon Survey	·	3.8 km	MPC · JPL
224546	2005 WE_{141}	—	November 28, 2005	Mount Lemmon	Mount Lemmon Survey	·	2.0 km	MPC · JPL
224547	2005 WY_{147}	—	November 25, 2005	Mount Lemmon	Mount Lemmon Survey	·	5.0 km	MPC · JPL
224548	2005 WZ_{147}	—	November 25, 2005	Mount Lemmon	Mount Lemmon Survey	·	2.3 km	MPC · JPL
224549	2005 WV_{148}	—	November 27, 2005	Anderson Mesa	LONEOS	EUN	1.5 km	MPC · JPL
224550	2005 WW_{148}	—	November 28, 2005	Kitt Peak	Spacewatch	HOF	3.7 km	MPC · JPL
224551	2005 WF_{149}	—	November 28, 2005	Kitt Peak	Spacewatch	(5)	1.5 km	MPC · JPL
224552	2005 WH_{150}	—	November 28, 2005	Socorro	LINEAR	·	2.5 km	MPC · JPL
224553	2005 WE_{151}	—	November 28, 2005	Kitt Peak	Spacewatch	·	1.5 km	MPC · JPL
224554	2005 WB_{152}	—	November 28, 2005	Catalina	CSS	·	4.1 km	MPC · JPL
224555	2005 WO_{156}	—	November 29, 2005	Palomar	NEAT	·	2.8 km	MPC · JPL
224556	2005 WU_{156}	—	November 30, 2005	Socorro	LINEAR	(29841)	2.2 km	MPC · JPL
224557	2005 WL_{158}	—	November 26, 2005	Catalina	CSS	·	3.2 km	MPC · JPL
224558	2005 WC_{176}	—	November 30, 2005	Kitt Peak	Spacewatch	DOR	3.4 km	MPC · JPL
224559	2005 WU_{178}	—	November 21, 2005	Palomar	NEAT	(194)	1.8 km	MPC · JPL
224560	2005 WE_{179}	—	November 21, 2005	Anderson Mesa	LONEOS	·	2.2 km	MPC · JPL
224561	2005 WH_{181}	—	November 25, 2005	Catalina	CSS	·	2.1 km	MPC · JPL
224562	2005 WB_{187}	—	November 29, 2005	Kitt Peak	Spacewatch	·	2.0 km	MPC · JPL
224563	2005 WC_{189}	—	November 30, 2005	Socorro	LINEAR	·	3.0 km	MPC · JPL
224564	2005 WM_{190}	—	November 20, 2005	Palomar	NEAT	MAR	2.1 km	MPC · JPL
224565	2005 WK_{191}	—	November 22, 2005	Catalina	CSS	·	2.8 km	MPC · JPL
224566	2005 WA_{192}	—	November 25, 2005	Catalina	CSS	·	2.0 km	MPC · JPL
224567	2005 WT_{195}	—	November 25, 2005	Mount Lemmon	Mount Lemmon Survey	·	5.1 km	MPC · JPL
224568	2005 WX_{208}	—	November 28, 2005	Mount Lemmon	Mount Lemmon Survey	·	2.0 km	MPC · JPL
224569	2005 XA_{2}	—	December 1, 2005	Socorro	LINEAR	·	2.1 km	MPC · JPL
224570	2005 XY_{2}	—	December 1, 2005	Kitt Peak	Spacewatch	AGN	1.4 km	MPC · JPL
224571	2005 XE_{6}	—	December 1, 2005	Palomar	NEAT	·	3.4 km	MPC · JPL
224572	2005 XO_{6}	—	December 2, 2005	Socorro	LINEAR	·	1.5 km	MPC · JPL
224573	2005 XQ_{8}	—	December 1, 2005	Kitt Peak	Spacewatch	·	2.1 km	MPC · JPL
224574	2005 XM_{18}	—	December 1, 2005	Kitt Peak	Spacewatch	·	2.5 km	MPC · JPL
224575	2005 XP_{22}	—	December 2, 2005	Socorro	LINEAR	·	1.7 km	MPC · JPL
224576	2005 XJ_{25}	—	December 4, 2005	Socorro	LINEAR	·	2.1 km	MPC · JPL
224577	2005 XG_{26}	—	December 4, 2005	Socorro	LINEAR	·	3.4 km	MPC · JPL
224578	2005 XY_{27}	—	December 1, 2005	Catalina	CSS	·	2.0 km	MPC · JPL
224579	2005 XP_{28}	—	December 1, 2005	Catalina	CSS	·	1.9 km	MPC · JPL
224580	2005 XR_{29}	—	December 7, 2005	Socorro	LINEAR	·	1.8 km	MPC · JPL
224581	2005 XE_{38}	—	December 4, 2005	Kitt Peak	Spacewatch	·	1.8 km	MPC · JPL
224582	2005 XY_{48}	—	December 2, 2005	Kitt Peak	Spacewatch	·	2.6 km	MPC · JPL
224583	2005 XF_{59}	—	December 3, 2005	Kitt Peak	Spacewatch	(12739)	2.2 km	MPC · JPL
224584	2005 XE_{61}	—	December 4, 2005	Socorro	LINEAR	·	2.1 km	MPC · JPL
224585	2005 XE_{63}	—	December 5, 2005	Mount Lemmon	Mount Lemmon Survey	AGN	1.8 km	MPC · JPL
224586	2005 XD_{64}	—	December 6, 2005	Catalina	CSS	·	2.7 km	MPC · JPL
224587	2005 XQ_{65}	—	December 4, 2005	Mount Lemmon	Mount Lemmon Survey	·	2.7 km	MPC · JPL
224588	2005 XB_{66}	—	December 7, 2005	Socorro	LINEAR	KON	3.9 km	MPC · JPL
224589	2005 XF_{70}	—	December 6, 2005	Kitt Peak	Spacewatch	·	3.2 km	MPC · JPL
224590	2005 XO_{74}	—	December 6, 2005	Kitt Peak	Spacewatch	·	2.1 km	MPC · JPL
224591 Fattig	2005 XG_{103}	Fattig	December 1, 2005	Kitt Peak	M. W. Buie	·	2.3 km	MPC · JPL
224592 Carnac	2005 YJ_{4}	Carnac	December 22, 2005	Nogales	J.-C. Merlin	KOR	1.7 km	MPC · JPL
224593	2005 YR_{7}	—	December 22, 2005	Kitt Peak	Spacewatch	·	2.5 km	MPC · JPL
224594	2005 YB_{8}	—	December 22, 2005	Kitt Peak	Spacewatch	·	2.5 km	MPC · JPL
224595	2005 YC_{8}	—	December 22, 2005	Kitt Peak	Spacewatch	THM	3.0 km	MPC · JPL
224596	2005 YF_{15}	—	December 22, 2005	Kitt Peak	Spacewatch	·	3.3 km	MPC · JPL
224597	2005 YX_{15}	—	December 22, 2005	Kitt Peak	Spacewatch	·	3.6 km	MPC · JPL
224598	2005 YJ_{22}	—	December 24, 2005	Kitt Peak	Spacewatch	KOR	2.3 km	MPC · JPL
224599	2005 YE_{24}	—	December 24, 2005	Kitt Peak	Spacewatch	·	2.2 km	MPC · JPL
224600	2005 YY_{27}	—	December 22, 2005	Kitt Peak	Spacewatch	KOR	1.8 km	MPC · JPL

== 224601–224700 ==
back to top

Designation			Discovery			Properties		Ref
Permanent	Provisional	Named after	Date	Site	Discoverer(s)	Category	Diam.	Ref
224601	2005 YD_{32}	—	December 22, 2005	Kitt Peak	Spacewatch	·	3.1 km	MPC · JPL
224602	2005 YJ_{40}	—	December 22, 2005	Kitt Peak	Spacewatch	·	3.9 km	MPC · JPL
224603	2005 YT_{42}	—	December 24, 2005	Kitt Peak	Spacewatch	KOR	1.7 km	MPC · JPL
224604	2005 YR_{44}	—	December 25, 2005	Kitt Peak	Spacewatch	HYG · fast	4.2 km	MPC · JPL
224605	2005 YU_{44}	—	December 25, 2005	Kitt Peak	Spacewatch	KOR	1.5 km	MPC · JPL
224606	2005 YR_{46}	—	December 25, 2005	Mount Lemmon	Mount Lemmon Survey	·	3.9 km	MPC · JPL
224607	2005 YG_{48}	—	December 22, 2005	Kitt Peak	Spacewatch	·	3.0 km	MPC · JPL
224608	2005 YV_{49}	—	December 24, 2005	Kitt Peak	Spacewatch	·	2.4 km	MPC · JPL
224609	2005 YS_{59}	—	December 22, 2005	Catalina	CSS	MAR	2.5 km	MPC · JPL
224610	2005 YR_{62}	—	December 24, 2005	Kitt Peak	Spacewatch	·	3.9 km	MPC · JPL
224611	2005 YV_{63}	—	December 24, 2005	Kitt Peak	Spacewatch	KOR	1.5 km	MPC · JPL
224612	2005 YL_{67}	—	December 26, 2005	Kitt Peak	Spacewatch	·	3.0 km	MPC · JPL
224613	2005 YR_{68}	—	December 26, 2005	Kitt Peak	Spacewatch	KOR	1.6 km	MPC · JPL
224614	2005 YD_{69}	—	December 26, 2005	Kitt Peak	Spacewatch	·	2.9 km	MPC · JPL
224615	2005 YW_{69}	—	December 26, 2005	Kitt Peak	Spacewatch	(12739)	2.2 km	MPC · JPL
224616	2005 YG_{70}	—	December 26, 2005	Kitt Peak	Spacewatch	KOR	1.9 km	MPC · JPL
224617 Micromégas	2005 YZ_{70}	Micromégas	December 22, 2005	Nogales	J.-C. Merlin	·	1.9 km	MPC · JPL
224618	2005 YB_{75}	—	December 24, 2005	Kitt Peak	Spacewatch	KOR	1.7 km	MPC · JPL
224619	2005 YY_{86}	—	December 25, 2005	Mount Lemmon	Mount Lemmon Survey	THM	2.8 km	MPC · JPL
224620	2005 YK_{98}	—	December 25, 2005	Kitt Peak	Spacewatch	AGN	1.4 km	MPC · JPL
224621	2005 YL_{98}	—	December 25, 2005	Kitt Peak	Spacewatch	·	1.5 km	MPC · JPL
224622	2005 YL_{100}	—	December 28, 2005	Socorro	LINEAR	·	2.8 km	MPC · JPL
224623	2005 YO_{101}	—	December 25, 2005	Kitt Peak	Spacewatch	AST	2.9 km	MPC · JPL
224624	2005 YR_{103}	—	December 25, 2005	Kitt Peak	Spacewatch	·	2.9 km	MPC · JPL
224625	2005 YX_{108}	—	December 25, 2005	Kitt Peak	Spacewatch	KOR	1.7 km	MPC · JPL
224626	2005 YV_{113}	—	December 25, 2005	Kitt Peak	Spacewatch	AGN	1.7 km	MPC · JPL
224627	2005 YB_{123}	—	December 24, 2005	Socorro	LINEAR	·	2.1 km	MPC · JPL
224628	2005 YF_{141}	—	December 28, 2005	Mount Lemmon	Mount Lemmon Survey	·	1.9 km	MPC · JPL
224629	2005 YN_{141}	—	December 28, 2005	Mount Lemmon	Mount Lemmon Survey	·	3.6 km	MPC · JPL
224630	2005 YF_{152}	—	December 27, 2005	Mount Lemmon	Mount Lemmon Survey	KOR	2.0 km	MPC · JPL
224631	2005 YG_{155}	—	December 24, 2005	Socorro	LINEAR	·	3.0 km	MPC · JPL
224632	2005 YM_{156}	—	December 26, 2005	Mount Lemmon	Mount Lemmon Survey	·	3.8 km	MPC · JPL
224633	2005 YS_{162}	—	December 27, 2005	Mount Lemmon	Mount Lemmon Survey	AEO	2.0 km	MPC · JPL
224634	2005 YD_{163}	—	December 27, 2005	Mount Lemmon	Mount Lemmon Survey	KOR	1.9 km	MPC · JPL
224635	2005 YW_{164}	—	December 29, 2005	Mount Lemmon	Mount Lemmon Survey	·	3.2 km	MPC · JPL
224636	2005 YE_{166}	—	December 26, 2005	Mount Lemmon	Mount Lemmon Survey	KOR	1.8 km	MPC · JPL
224637	2005 YG_{166}	—	December 27, 2005	Kitt Peak	Spacewatch	HOF	3.1 km	MPC · JPL
224638	2005 YZ_{172}	—	December 24, 2005	Socorro	LINEAR	·	2.3 km	MPC · JPL
224639	2005 YA_{174}	—	December 27, 2005	Socorro	LINEAR	·	2.0 km	MPC · JPL
224640	2005 YB_{174}	—	December 27, 2005	Catalina	CSS	615	2.5 km	MPC · JPL
224641	2005 YN_{175}	—	December 22, 2005	Kitt Peak	Spacewatch	KOR	2.2 km	MPC · JPL
224642	2005 YK_{190}	—	December 30, 2005	Kitt Peak	Spacewatch	·	3.6 km	MPC · JPL
224643	2005 YK_{192}	—	December 30, 2005	Kitt Peak	Spacewatch	·	4.0 km	MPC · JPL
224644	2005 YM_{196}	—	December 24, 2005	Kitt Peak	Spacewatch	KOR	1.6 km	MPC · JPL
224645	2005 YZ_{201}	—	December 24, 2005	Kitt Peak	Spacewatch	·	4.1 km	MPC · JPL
224646	2005 YQ_{208}	—	December 21, 2005	Catalina	CSS	·	2.8 km	MPC · JPL
224647	2005 YC_{210}	—	December 24, 2005	Socorro	LINEAR	·	2.3 km	MPC · JPL
224648	2005 YS_{217}	—	December 31, 2005	Kitt Peak	Spacewatch	·	2.4 km	MPC · JPL
224649	2005 YT_{225}	—	December 25, 2005	Kitt Peak	Spacewatch	·	1.7 km	MPC · JPL
224650	2005 YF_{235}	—	December 28, 2005	Mount Lemmon	Mount Lemmon Survey	·	2.9 km	MPC · JPL
224651	2005 YG_{251}	—	December 28, 2005	Kitt Peak	Spacewatch	·	1.7 km	MPC · JPL
224652	2005 YJ_{253}	—	December 29, 2005	Kitt Peak	Spacewatch	·	4.1 km	MPC · JPL
224653	2005 YO_{266}	—	December 29, 2005	Socorro	LINEAR	EOS	3.4 km	MPC · JPL
224654	2005 YQ_{274}	—	December 30, 2005	Kitt Peak	Spacewatch	·	2.4 km	MPC · JPL
224655	2005 YR_{280}	—	December 25, 2005	Mount Lemmon	Mount Lemmon Survey	·	3.0 km	MPC · JPL
224656	2005 YG_{282}	—	December 26, 2005	Mount Lemmon	Mount Lemmon Survey	·	2.0 km	MPC · JPL
224657	2005 YW_{282}	—	December 27, 2005	Mount Lemmon	Mount Lemmon Survey	KOR	2.0 km	MPC · JPL
224658	2005 YM_{287}	—	December 25, 2005	Anderson Mesa	LONEOS	·	6.1 km	MPC · JPL
224659	2006 AR	—	January 3, 2006	Desert Moon	Stevens, B. L.	·	2.1 km	MPC · JPL
224660	2006 AY	—	January 3, 2006	Marly	Observatoire Naef	·	2.6 km	MPC · JPL
224661	2006 AV_{5}	—	January 2, 2006	Socorro	LINEAR	LIX	7.0 km	MPC · JPL
224662	2006 AF_{7}	—	January 5, 2006	Catalina	CSS	NAE	4.5 km	MPC · JPL
224663	2006 AJ_{7}	—	January 5, 2006	Anderson Mesa	LONEOS	·	2.1 km	MPC · JPL
224664	2006 AJ_{13}	—	January 5, 2006	Mount Lemmon	Mount Lemmon Survey	·	3.6 km	MPC · JPL
224665	2006 AV_{15}	—	January 2, 2006	Catalina	CSS	·	6.1 km	MPC · JPL
224666	2006 AV_{18}	—	January 5, 2006	Catalina	CSS	EOS	3.7 km	MPC · JPL
224667	2006 AV_{26}	—	January 5, 2006	Catalina	CSS	·	3.0 km	MPC · JPL
224668	2006 AD_{27}	—	January 5, 2006	Mount Lemmon	Mount Lemmon Survey	KOR	2.0 km	MPC · JPL
224669	2006 AA_{32}	—	January 5, 2006	Catalina	CSS	·	2.4 km	MPC · JPL
224670	2006 AB_{42}	—	January 6, 2006	Socorro	LINEAR	(32418)	2.9 km	MPC · JPL
224671	2006 AM_{44}	—	January 7, 2006	Kitt Peak	Spacewatch	EOS	3.4 km	MPC · JPL
224672	2006 AY_{45}	—	January 5, 2006	Kitt Peak	Spacewatch	·	2.6 km	MPC · JPL
224673	2006 AF_{49}	—	January 5, 2006	Kitt Peak	Spacewatch	KOR	1.7 km	MPC · JPL
224674	2006 AS_{55}	—	January 6, 2006	Socorro	LINEAR	(12739)	2.6 km	MPC · JPL
224675	2006 AV_{56}	—	January 7, 2006	Mount Lemmon	Mount Lemmon Survey	·	2.8 km	MPC · JPL
224676	2006 AD_{58}	—	January 8, 2006	Mount Lemmon	Mount Lemmon Survey	·	2.4 km	MPC · JPL
224677	2006 AW_{58}	—	January 4, 2006	Mount Lemmon	Mount Lemmon Survey	KOR	1.7 km	MPC · JPL
224678	2006 AZ_{58}	—	January 4, 2006	Mount Lemmon	Mount Lemmon Survey	THM	2.7 km	MPC · JPL
224679	2006 AL_{67}	—	January 9, 2006	Kitt Peak	Spacewatch	EOS	2.9 km	MPC · JPL
224680	2006 AC_{71}	—	January 6, 2006	Kitt Peak	Spacewatch	KOR	2.0 km	MPC · JPL
224681	2006 AR_{71}	—	January 6, 2006	Mount Lemmon	Mount Lemmon Survey	·	4.5 km	MPC · JPL
224682	2006 AX_{71}	—	January 6, 2006	Kitt Peak	Spacewatch	·	3.6 km	MPC · JPL
224683	2006 AP_{80}	—	January 6, 2006	Mount Lemmon	Mount Lemmon Survey	KOR	1.8 km	MPC · JPL
224684	2006 AU_{83}	—	January 5, 2006	Socorro	LINEAR	slow	3.8 km	MPC · JPL
224685	2006 AU_{86}	—	January 7, 2006	Anderson Mesa	LONEOS	DOR	3.6 km	MPC · JPL
224686	2006 AH_{90}	—	January 6, 2006	Mount Lemmon	Mount Lemmon Survey	·	1.9 km	MPC · JPL
224687	2006 AQ_{91}	—	January 7, 2006	Mount Lemmon	Mount Lemmon Survey	·	2.2 km	MPC · JPL
224688	2006 AQ_{96}	—	January 7, 2006	Anderson Mesa	LONEOS	LIX	5.3 km	MPC · JPL
224689	2006 AC_{100}	—	January 7, 2006	Kitt Peak	Spacewatch	THM	2.5 km	MPC · JPL
224690	2006 BV_{10}	—	January 20, 2006	Kitt Peak	Spacewatch	·	3.1 km	MPC · JPL
224691	2006 BL_{12}	—	January 21, 2006	Palomar	NEAT	·	4.0 km	MPC · JPL
224692	2006 BK_{22}	—	January 22, 2006	Mount Lemmon	Mount Lemmon Survey	·	2.3 km	MPC · JPL
224693 Morganfreeman	2006 BO_{26}	Morganfreeman	January 21, 2006	Vallemare Borbona	V. S. Casulli	·	3.6 km	MPC · JPL
224694	2006 BM_{27}	—	January 22, 2006	Anderson Mesa	LONEOS	EOS	2.9 km	MPC · JPL
224695	2006 BD_{30}	—	January 20, 2006	Kitt Peak	Spacewatch	·	3.4 km	MPC · JPL
224696	2006 BH_{31}	—	January 20, 2006	Kitt Peak	Spacewatch	·	2.8 km	MPC · JPL
224697	2006 BT_{32}	—	January 21, 2006	Kitt Peak	Spacewatch	·	2.6 km	MPC · JPL
224698	2006 BB_{33}	—	January 21, 2006	Kitt Peak	Spacewatch	EOS	3.5 km	MPC · JPL
224699	2006 BN_{33}	—	January 21, 2006	Kitt Peak	Spacewatch	EOS	2.7 km	MPC · JPL
224700	2006 BO_{54}	—	January 25, 2006	Kitt Peak	Spacewatch	·	3.0 km	MPC · JPL

== 224701–224800 ==
back to top

Designation			Discovery			Properties		Ref
Permanent	Provisional	Named after	Date	Site	Discoverer(s)	Category	Diam.	Ref
224701	2006 BE_{68}	—	January 23, 2006	Kitt Peak	Spacewatch	EOS	3.0 km	MPC · JPL
224702	2006 BR_{75}	—	January 23, 2006	Kitt Peak	Spacewatch	·	4.6 km	MPC · JPL
224703	2006 BO_{86}	—	January 25, 2006	Kitt Peak	Spacewatch	·	3.4 km	MPC · JPL
224704	2006 BW_{88}	—	January 25, 2006	Kitt Peak	Spacewatch	·	3.7 km	MPC · JPL
224705	2006 BU_{89}	—	January 25, 2006	Kitt Peak	Spacewatch	·	3.6 km	MPC · JPL
224706	2006 BR_{102}	—	January 23, 2006	Mount Lemmon	Mount Lemmon Survey	·	2.2 km	MPC · JPL
224707	2006 BW_{107}	—	January 25, 2006	Kitt Peak	Spacewatch	·	2.9 km	MPC · JPL
224708	2006 BX_{114}	—	January 26, 2006	Kitt Peak	Spacewatch	·	3.6 km	MPC · JPL
224709	2006 BL_{120}	—	January 26, 2006	Kitt Peak	Spacewatch	·	3.3 km	MPC · JPL
224710	2006 BW_{131}	—	January 26, 2006	Kitt Peak	Spacewatch	·	3.2 km	MPC · JPL
224711	2006 BN_{134}	—	January 27, 2006	Mount Lemmon	Mount Lemmon Survey	EOS	6.1 km	MPC · JPL
224712	2006 BH_{138}	—	January 28, 2006	Mount Lemmon	Mount Lemmon Survey	·	3.7 km	MPC · JPL
224713	2006 BW_{138}	—	January 28, 2006	Mount Lemmon	Mount Lemmon Survey	KOR	2.0 km	MPC · JPL
224714	2006 BO_{152}	—	January 25, 2006	Kitt Peak	Spacewatch	·	4.6 km	MPC · JPL
224715	2006 BT_{161}	—	January 26, 2006	Anderson Mesa	LONEOS	·	3.8 km	MPC · JPL
224716	2006 BE_{164}	—	January 26, 2006	Mount Lemmon	Mount Lemmon Survey	·	4.3 km	MPC · JPL
224717	2006 BX_{166}	—	January 26, 2006	Mount Lemmon	Mount Lemmon Survey	EOS	3.0 km	MPC · JPL
224718	2006 BF_{169}	—	January 26, 2006	Mount Lemmon	Mount Lemmon Survey	·	3.4 km	MPC · JPL
224719	2006 BA_{171}	—	January 27, 2006	Kitt Peak	Spacewatch	KOR	1.6 km	MPC · JPL
224720	2006 BM_{177}	—	January 27, 2006	Mount Lemmon	Mount Lemmon Survey	AGN	1.6 km	MPC · JPL
224721	2006 BQ_{180}	—	January 27, 2006	Mount Lemmon	Mount Lemmon Survey	·	3.3 km	MPC · JPL
224722	2006 BD_{181}	—	January 27, 2006	Mount Lemmon	Mount Lemmon Survey	·	5.6 km	MPC · JPL
224723	2006 BW_{190}	—	January 28, 2006	Mount Lemmon	Mount Lemmon Survey	·	5.6 km	MPC · JPL
224724	2006 BP_{202}	—	January 31, 2006	Kitt Peak	Spacewatch	·	3.0 km	MPC · JPL
224725	2006 BT_{206}	—	January 31, 2006	Mount Lemmon	Mount Lemmon Survey	ANF	2.3 km	MPC · JPL
224726	2006 BE_{208}	—	January 31, 2006	Catalina	CSS	EOS	5.9 km	MPC · JPL
224727	2006 BB_{232}	—	January 31, 2006	Kitt Peak	Spacewatch	·	3.9 km	MPC · JPL
224728	2006 BF_{263}	—	January 31, 2006	Kitt Peak	Spacewatch	·	5.6 km	MPC · JPL
224729	2006 BF_{268}	—	January 26, 2006	Catalina	CSS	·	4.7 km	MPC · JPL
224730	2006 BT_{269}	—	January 28, 2006	Anderson Mesa	LONEOS	·	5.5 km	MPC · JPL
224731	2006 CK_{9}	—	February 3, 2006	7300	W. K. Y. Yeung	·	4.6 km	MPC · JPL
224732	2006 CO_{12}	—	February 1, 2006	Kitt Peak	Spacewatch	KOR	1.7 km	MPC · JPL
224733	2006 CX_{27}	—	February 2, 2006	Kitt Peak	Spacewatch	·	3.4 km	MPC · JPL
224734	2006 CG_{31}	—	February 2, 2006	Kitt Peak	Spacewatch	·	4.2 km	MPC · JPL
224735	2006 DR_{1}	—	February 20, 2006	Kitt Peak	Spacewatch	·	5.2 km	MPC · JPL
224736	2006 DN_{6}	—	February 20, 2006	Kitt Peak	Spacewatch	·	3.4 km	MPC · JPL
224737	2006 DL_{7}	—	February 20, 2006	Mount Lemmon	Mount Lemmon Survey	·	4.8 km	MPC · JPL
224738	2006 DZ_{37}	—	February 20, 2006	Mount Lemmon	Mount Lemmon Survey	·	3.5 km	MPC · JPL
224739	2006 DQ_{41}	—	February 23, 2006	Kitt Peak	Spacewatch	·	5.0 km	MPC · JPL
224740	2006 DZ_{42}	—	February 20, 2006	Kitt Peak	Spacewatch	·	3.2 km	MPC · JPL
224741	2006 DO_{44}	—	February 20, 2006	Catalina	CSS	THM	3.0 km	MPC · JPL
224742	2006 DT_{44}	—	February 20, 2006	Kitt Peak	Spacewatch	KOR	2.0 km	MPC · JPL
224743	2006 DV_{49}	—	February 22, 2006	Anderson Mesa	LONEOS	·	4.1 km	MPC · JPL
224744	2006 DQ_{50}	—	February 22, 2006	Socorro	LINEAR	·	5.3 km	MPC · JPL
224745	2006 DX_{56}	—	February 24, 2006	Palomar	NEAT	·	6.8 km	MPC · JPL
224746	2006 DP_{67}	—	February 23, 2006	Anderson Mesa	LONEOS	·	5.3 km	MPC · JPL
224747	2006 DH_{68}	—	February 23, 2006	Anderson Mesa	LONEOS	LUT	5.6 km	MPC · JPL
224748	2006 DD_{73}	—	February 22, 2006	Catalina	CSS	HYG	4.2 km	MPC · JPL
224749	2006 DL_{86}	—	February 24, 2006	Kitt Peak	Spacewatch	·	4.4 km	MPC · JPL
224750	2006 DA_{91}	—	February 24, 2006	Kitt Peak	Spacewatch	CYB	5.7 km	MPC · JPL
224751	2006 DS_{94}	—	February 24, 2006	Kitt Peak	Spacewatch	·	4.2 km	MPC · JPL
224752	2006 DO_{112}	—	February 27, 2006	Mount Lemmon	Mount Lemmon Survey	·	5.0 km	MPC · JPL
224753	2006 DP_{137}	—	February 25, 2006	Kitt Peak	Spacewatch	·	5.3 km	MPC · JPL
224754	2006 DN_{149}	—	February 25, 2006	Kitt Peak	Spacewatch	·	4.2 km	MPC · JPL
224755	2006 DX_{156}	—	February 27, 2006	Kitt Peak	Spacewatch	·	4.1 km	MPC · JPL
224756	2006 DY_{179}	—	February 27, 2006	Mount Lemmon	Mount Lemmon Survey	·	3.5 km	MPC · JPL
224757	2006 DC_{186}	—	February 27, 2006	Kitt Peak	Spacewatch	·	3.4 km	MPC · JPL
224758	2006 DD_{196}	—	February 22, 2006	Catalina	CSS	EOS	4.4 km	MPC · JPL
224759	2006 DK_{201}	—	February 27, 2006	Catalina	CSS	·	6.3 km	MPC · JPL
224760	2006 DT_{204}	—	February 27, 2006	Catalina	CSS	·	5.1 km	MPC · JPL
224761	2006 EN_{1}	—	March 2, 2006	Mount Nyukasa	Japan Aerospace Exploration Agency	·	4.3 km	MPC · JPL
224762	2006 ET_{8}	—	March 2, 2006	Kitt Peak	Spacewatch	·	5.1 km	MPC · JPL
224763	2006 EC_{12}	—	March 2, 2006	Kitt Peak	Spacewatch	·	3.9 km	MPC · JPL
224764	2006 EW_{16}	—	March 2, 2006	Mount Lemmon	Mount Lemmon Survey	THM	3.1 km	MPC · JPL
224765	2006 EQ_{56}	—	March 5, 2006	Kitt Peak	Spacewatch	·	3.7 km	MPC · JPL
224766	2006 EP_{65}	—	March 5, 2006	Kitt Peak	Spacewatch	·	3.2 km	MPC · JPL
224767	2006 EK_{66}	—	March 5, 2006	Kitt Peak	Spacewatch	·	4.3 km	MPC · JPL
224768	2006 FZ_{1}	—	March 23, 2006	Mount Lemmon	Mount Lemmon Survey	·	4.2 km	MPC · JPL
224769	2006 FC_{14}	—	March 23, 2006	Kitt Peak	Spacewatch	CYB	5.6 km	MPC · JPL
224770	2006 FK_{16}	—	March 23, 2006	Mount Lemmon	Mount Lemmon Survey	THM	2.5 km	MPC · JPL
224771	2006 FN_{16}	—	March 23, 2006	Mount Lemmon	Mount Lemmon Survey	SYL · CYB	6.4 km	MPC · JPL
224772	2006 FJ_{21}	—	March 24, 2006	Mount Lemmon	Mount Lemmon Survey	·	2.9 km	MPC · JPL
224773	2006 FV_{48}	—	March 25, 2006	Catalina	CSS	·	5.7 km	MPC · JPL
224774	2006 FA_{49}	—	March 25, 2006	Catalina	CSS	·	7.5 km	MPC · JPL
224775	2006 FY_{51}	—	March 27, 2006	Siding Spring	SSS	TIR	5.1 km	MPC · JPL
224776	2006 GV_{13}	—	April 2, 2006	Mount Lemmon	Mount Lemmon Survey	·	4.2 km	MPC · JPL
224777	2006 GF_{32}	—	April 6, 2006	Kitt Peak	Spacewatch	·	4.6 km	MPC · JPL
224778	2006 GE_{38}	—	April 2, 2006	Anderson Mesa	LONEOS	·	5.2 km	MPC · JPL
224779	2006 GM_{41}	—	April 7, 2006	Catalina	CSS	TIR	4.1 km	MPC · JPL
224780	2006 GU_{51}	—	April 7, 2006	Anderson Mesa	LONEOS	·	7.1 km	MPC · JPL
224781	2006 HX_{34}	—	April 19, 2006	Mount Lemmon	Mount Lemmon Survey	·	3.7 km	MPC · JPL
224782	2006 JB_{42}	—	May 8, 2006	Mount Lemmon	Mount Lemmon Survey	L4	13 km	MPC · JPL
224783	2006 QP_{82}	—	August 25, 2006	Socorro	LINEAR	·	850 m	MPC · JPL
224784	2006 QU_{115}	—	August 27, 2006	Anderson Mesa	LONEOS	·	960 m	MPC · JPL
224785	2006 QN_{164}	—	August 29, 2006	Anderson Mesa	LONEOS	H	870 m	MPC · JPL
224786	2006 SC_{12}	—	September 16, 2006	Catalina	CSS	·	1.0 km	MPC · JPL
224787	2006 SH_{19}	—	September 17, 2006	Anderson Mesa	LONEOS	H	800 m	MPC · JPL
224788	2006 SB_{50}	—	September 19, 2006	La Sagra	OAM	·	740 m	MPC · JPL
224789	2006 SM_{62}	—	September 18, 2006	Catalina	CSS	·	930 m	MPC · JPL
224790	2006 SW_{97}	—	September 18, 2006	Kitt Peak	Spacewatch	·	1.0 km	MPC · JPL
224791	2006 SS_{273}	—	September 27, 2006	Mount Lemmon	Mount Lemmon Survey	·	970 m	MPC · JPL
224792	2006 SF_{371}	—	September 25, 2006	Apache Point	SDSS	L4	13 km	MPC · JPL
224793	2006 SG_{371}	—	September 27, 2006	Apache Point	SDSS	L4	10 km	MPC · JPL
224794	2006 SU_{394}	—	September 20, 2006	Anderson Mesa	LONEOS	V	1.4 km	MPC · JPL
224795	2006 TD_{6}	—	October 3, 2006	Mount Lemmon	Mount Lemmon Survey	·	1.0 km	MPC · JPL
224796	2006 TA_{53}	—	October 12, 2006	Kitt Peak	Spacewatch	·	1.2 km	MPC · JPL
224797	2006 TJ_{90}	—	October 13, 2006	Kitt Peak	Spacewatch	·	900 m	MPC · JPL
224798	2006 UL_{7}	—	October 16, 2006	Catalina	CSS	·	1.1 km	MPC · JPL
224799	2006 UQ_{25}	—	October 16, 2006	Kitt Peak	Spacewatch	·	940 m	MPC · JPL
224800	2006 UY_{96}	—	October 18, 2006	Kitt Peak	Spacewatch	·	920 m	MPC · JPL

== 224801–224900 ==
back to top

Designation			Discovery			Properties		Ref
Permanent	Provisional	Named after	Date	Site	Discoverer(s)	Category	Diam.	Ref
224801	2006 UQ_{127}	—	October 19, 2006	Kitt Peak	Spacewatch	·	730 m	MPC · JPL
224802	2006 UK_{199}	—	October 20, 2006	Kitt Peak	Spacewatch	·	760 m	MPC · JPL
224803	2006 UC_{212}	—	October 23, 2006	Kitt Peak	Spacewatch	(2076)	1.3 km	MPC · JPL
224804	2006 UV_{234}	—	October 22, 2006	Mount Lemmon	Mount Lemmon Survey	·	1.0 km	MPC · JPL
224805	2006 UP_{238}	—	October 23, 2006	Kitt Peak	Spacewatch	·	760 m	MPC · JPL
224806	2006 UW_{275}	—	October 28, 2006	Kitt Peak	Spacewatch	·	920 m	MPC · JPL
224807	2006 UD_{282}	—	October 28, 2006	Mount Lemmon	Mount Lemmon Survey	·	900 m	MPC · JPL
224808	2006 UU_{286}	—	October 28, 2006	Mount Lemmon	Mount Lemmon Survey	V	820 m	MPC · JPL
224809	2006 UY_{286}	—	October 28, 2006	Kitt Peak	Spacewatch	·	810 m	MPC · JPL
224810	2006 US_{329}	—	October 28, 2006	Mount Lemmon	Mount Lemmon Survey	·	920 m	MPC · JPL
224811	2006 VQ_{17}	—	November 9, 2006	Kitt Peak	Spacewatch	·	910 m	MPC · JPL
224812	2006 VV_{22}	—	November 10, 2006	Kitt Peak	Spacewatch	·	940 m	MPC · JPL
224813	2006 VH_{27}	—	November 10, 2006	Kitt Peak	Spacewatch	·	870 m	MPC · JPL
224814	2006 VW_{28}	—	November 10, 2006	Kitt Peak	Spacewatch	·	970 m	MPC · JPL
224815	2006 VN_{37}	—	November 11, 2006	Catalina	CSS	·	1.4 km	MPC · JPL
224816	2006 VW_{43}	—	November 13, 2006	Kitt Peak	Spacewatch	·	1.1 km	MPC · JPL
224817	2006 VE_{44}	—	November 13, 2006	Catalina	CSS	·	1.0 km	MPC · JPL
224818	2006 VJ_{62}	—	November 11, 2006	Kitt Peak	Spacewatch	·	870 m	MPC · JPL
224819	2006 VN_{62}	—	November 11, 2006	Kitt Peak	Spacewatch	·	830 m	MPC · JPL
224820	2006 VM_{89}	—	November 14, 2006	Kitt Peak	Spacewatch	·	1.6 km	MPC · JPL
224821	2006 VW_{92}	—	November 15, 2006	Mount Lemmon	Mount Lemmon Survey	·	1.0 km	MPC · JPL
224822	2006 VE_{96}	—	November 10, 2006	Kitt Peak	Spacewatch	·	1.0 km	MPC · JPL
224823	2006 VG_{107}	—	November 13, 2006	Kitt Peak	Spacewatch	·	1.0 km	MPC · JPL
224824	2006 VT_{139}	—	November 15, 2006	Kitt Peak	Spacewatch	V	910 m	MPC · JPL
224825	2006 VV_{169}	—	November 11, 2006	Kitt Peak	Spacewatch	·	900 m	MPC · JPL
224826	2006 WC_{11}	—	November 16, 2006	Socorro	LINEAR	·	840 m	MPC · JPL
224827	2006 WA_{21}	—	November 17, 2006	Mount Lemmon	Mount Lemmon Survey	·	1.1 km	MPC · JPL
224828	2006 WQ_{33}	—	November 16, 2006	Kitt Peak	Spacewatch	·	640 m	MPC · JPL
224829	2006 WD_{80}	—	November 18, 2006	Kitt Peak	Spacewatch	·	1 km	MPC · JPL
224830	2006 WN_{114}	—	November 20, 2006	Kitt Peak	Spacewatch	·	1.1 km	MPC · JPL
224831 Neeffisis	2006 WV_{129}	Neeffisis	November 27, 2006	Taunus	E. Schwab, R. Kling	·	850 m	MPC · JPL
224832	2006 WP_{160}	—	November 22, 2006	Kitt Peak	Spacewatch	·	1.8 km	MPC · JPL
224833	2006 WO_{161}	—	November 23, 2006	Kitt Peak	Spacewatch	·	920 m	MPC · JPL
224834	2006 WN_{172}	—	November 23, 2006	Kitt Peak	Spacewatch	NYS	1.0 km	MPC · JPL
224835	2006 WO_{182}	—	November 24, 2006	Mount Lemmon	Mount Lemmon Survey	NYS	1.7 km	MPC · JPL
224836	2006 WP_{186}	—	November 22, 2006	Mount Lemmon	Mount Lemmon Survey	·	1.2 km	MPC · JPL
224837	2006 WJ_{195}	—	November 29, 2006	Socorro	LINEAR	·	1.8 km	MPC · JPL
224838	2006 WN_{204}	—	November 16, 2006	Kitt Peak	Spacewatch	·	1.9 km	MPC · JPL
224839	2006 XO_{14}	—	December 10, 2006	Kitt Peak	Spacewatch	·	980 m	MPC · JPL
224840	2006 XM_{17}	—	December 10, 2006	Kitt Peak	Spacewatch	·	1.0 km	MPC · JPL
224841	2006 XR_{17}	—	December 10, 2006	Kitt Peak	Spacewatch	·	2.4 km	MPC · JPL
224842	2006 XN_{18}	—	December 10, 2006	Pla D'Arguines	R. Ferrando	·	1.1 km	MPC · JPL
224843	2006 XO_{19}	—	December 11, 2006	Kitt Peak	Spacewatch	·	1.1 km	MPC · JPL
224844	2006 XR_{32}	—	December 10, 2006	Kitt Peak	Spacewatch	·	810 m	MPC · JPL
224845	2006 XT_{38}	—	December 11, 2006	Kitt Peak	Spacewatch	·	980 m	MPC · JPL
224846	2006 XB_{49}	—	December 13, 2006	Mount Lemmon	Mount Lemmon Survey	·	1.5 km	MPC · JPL
224847	2006 XN_{49}	—	December 13, 2006	Mount Lemmon	Mount Lemmon Survey	·	1.3 km	MPC · JPL
224848	2006 XQ_{57}	—	December 14, 2006	Mount Lemmon	Mount Lemmon Survey	·	910 m	MPC · JPL
224849	2006 XR_{60}	—	December 14, 2006	Kitt Peak	Spacewatch	·	940 m	MPC · JPL
224850	2006 YK_{1}	—	December 16, 2006	Mount Lemmon	Mount Lemmon Survey	·	1.6 km	MPC · JPL
224851	2006 YG_{8}	—	December 20, 2006	Mount Lemmon	Mount Lemmon Survey	·	1.3 km	MPC · JPL
224852	2006 YF_{15}	—	December 20, 2006	Palomar	NEAT	H	890 m	MPC · JPL
224853	2006 YM_{17}	—	December 21, 2006	Mount Lemmon	Mount Lemmon Survey	·	1.2 km	MPC · JPL
224854	2006 YQ_{18}	—	December 23, 2006	Catalina	CSS	·	1.0 km	MPC · JPL
224855	2006 YZ_{20}	—	December 21, 2006	Kitt Peak	Spacewatch	·	1.0 km	MPC · JPL
224856	2006 YK_{26}	—	December 21, 2006	Kitt Peak	Spacewatch	·	1.3 km	MPC · JPL
224857	2006 YE_{45}	—	December 21, 2006	Kitt Peak	Spacewatch	NYS	1.6 km	MPC · JPL
224858 Kunmária	2006 YO_{49}	Kunmária	December 28, 2006	Piszkéstető	K. Sárneczky	·	940 m	MPC · JPL
224859	2006 YD_{51}	—	December 21, 2006	Kitt Peak	Spacewatch	·	1.7 km	MPC · JPL
224860	2006 YF_{51}	—	December 24, 2006	Kitt Peak	Spacewatch	·	2.0 km	MPC · JPL
224861	2006 YD_{52}	—	December 16, 2006	Mount Lemmon	Mount Lemmon Survey	GEF	1.9 km	MPC · JPL
224862	2007 AG_{7}	—	January 9, 2007	Kitt Peak	Spacewatch	MAS	1.1 km	MPC · JPL
224863	2007 AP_{12}	—	January 13, 2007	Altschwendt	W. Ries	·	3.6 km	MPC · JPL
224864	2007 AM_{13}	—	January 9, 2007	Mount Lemmon	Mount Lemmon Survey	·	1.9 km	MPC · JPL
224865	2007 AR_{13}	—	January 9, 2007	Mount Lemmon	Mount Lemmon Survey	·	860 m	MPC · JPL
224866	2007 AD_{18}	—	January 8, 2007	Catalina	CSS	NYS	1.5 km	MPC · JPL
224867	2007 AA_{21}	—	January 10, 2007	Kitt Peak	Spacewatch	·	1.7 km	MPC · JPL
224868	2007 AP_{23}	—	January 10, 2007	Mount Lemmon	Mount Lemmon Survey	(2076)	1.0 km	MPC · JPL
224869	2007 AU_{24}	—	January 15, 2007	Catalina	CSS	·	1.0 km	MPC · JPL
224870	2007 AR_{28}	—	January 9, 2007	Kitt Peak	Spacewatch	(5)	1.5 km	MPC · JPL
224871	2007 AQ_{30}	—	January 10, 2007	Mount Lemmon	Mount Lemmon Survey	·	1.4 km	MPC · JPL
224872	2007 BA_{9}	—	January 17, 2007	Kitt Peak	Spacewatch	·	1.8 km	MPC · JPL
224873	2007 BA_{32}	—	January 24, 2007	Mount Lemmon	Mount Lemmon Survey	·	1.2 km	MPC · JPL
224874	2007 BR_{38}	—	January 24, 2007	Catalina	CSS	·	1.1 km	MPC · JPL
224875	2007 BL_{42}	—	January 24, 2007	Catalina	CSS	NYS	1.6 km	MPC · JPL
224876	2007 BT_{43}	—	January 24, 2007	Catalina	CSS	NYS	1.5 km	MPC · JPL
224877	2007 BF_{45}	—	January 25, 2007	Catalina	CSS	·	1.4 km	MPC · JPL
224878	2007 BM_{60}	—	January 26, 2007	Kitt Peak	Spacewatch	·	1.5 km	MPC · JPL
224879	2007 BW_{67}	—	January 27, 2007	Kitt Peak	Spacewatch	·	4.2 km	MPC · JPL
224880	2007 BH_{68}	—	January 27, 2007	Kitt Peak	Spacewatch	SUL	2.5 km	MPC · JPL
224881	2007 BR_{71}	—	January 28, 2007	Kitt Peak	Spacewatch	·	1.6 km	MPC · JPL
224882	2007 BS_{74}	—	January 17, 2007	Mount Lemmon	Mount Lemmon Survey	·	1.5 km	MPC · JPL
224883	2007 BX_{78}	—	January 27, 2007	Mount Lemmon	Mount Lemmon Survey	·	1.3 km	MPC · JPL
224884	2007 BS_{79}	—	January 29, 2007	Kitt Peak	Spacewatch	NYS	1.3 km	MPC · JPL
224885	2007 BH_{80}	—	January 17, 2007	Kitt Peak	Spacewatch	MAS	750 m	MPC · JPL
224886	2007 CS	—	February 5, 2007	Palomar	NEAT	·	950 m	MPC · JPL
224887	2007 CW_{2}	—	February 6, 2007	Kitt Peak	Spacewatch	NYS	1.4 km	MPC · JPL
224888 Cochingchu	2007 CC_{6}	Cochingchu	February 5, 2007	Lulin	Q. Ye, Lin, H.-C.	·	1.0 km	MPC · JPL
224889	2007 CM_{10}	—	February 6, 2007	Mount Lemmon	Mount Lemmon Survey	·	1.1 km	MPC · JPL
224890	2007 CN_{11}	—	February 6, 2007	Mount Lemmon	Mount Lemmon Survey	MAS	820 m	MPC · JPL
224891	2007 CP_{14}	—	February 7, 2007	Mount Lemmon	Mount Lemmon Survey	·	990 m	MPC · JPL
224892	2007 CK_{16}	—	February 7, 2007	Mount Lemmon	Mount Lemmon Survey	·	1.7 km	MPC · JPL
224893	2007 CJ_{19}	—	February 5, 2007	Palomar	NEAT	V	870 m	MPC · JPL
224894	2007 CT_{21}	—	February 6, 2007	Palomar	NEAT	·	1.7 km	MPC · JPL
224895	2007 CV_{21}	—	February 6, 2007	Palomar	NEAT	·	2.3 km	MPC · JPL
224896	2007 CK_{22}	—	February 6, 2007	Mount Lemmon	Mount Lemmon Survey	MAR	1.7 km	MPC · JPL
224897	2007 CF_{25}	—	February 8, 2007	Kitt Peak	Spacewatch	·	2.8 km	MPC · JPL
224898	2007 CV_{27}	—	February 6, 2007	Kitt Peak	Spacewatch	·	2.1 km	MPC · JPL
224899	2007 CS_{40}	—	February 7, 2007	Kitt Peak	Spacewatch	NYS	1.9 km	MPC · JPL
224900	2007 CF_{46}	—	February 8, 2007	Palomar	NEAT	·	1.7 km	MPC · JPL

== 224901–225000 ==
back to top

Designation			Discovery			Properties		Ref
Permanent	Provisional	Named after	Date	Site	Discoverer(s)	Category	Diam.	Ref
224901	2007 CJ_{47}	—	February 8, 2007	Palomar	NEAT	·	3.6 km	MPC · JPL
224902	2007 CP_{54}	—	February 14, 2007	Lulin	Lin, C.-S., Q. Ye	·	2.2 km	MPC · JPL
224903	2007 CW_{59}	—	February 10, 2007	Catalina	CSS	·	1.7 km	MPC · JPL
224904	2007 CL_{63}	—	February 15, 2007	Palomar	NEAT	·	4.0 km	MPC · JPL
224905	2007 CM_{64}	—	February 8, 2007	Kitt Peak	Spacewatch	·	2.4 km	MPC · JPL
224906	2007 CW_{64}	—	February 7, 2007	Mount Lemmon	Mount Lemmon Survey	·	7.0 km	MPC · JPL
224907	2007 CB_{65}	—	February 6, 2007	Kitt Peak	Spacewatch	·	1.5 km	MPC · JPL
224908	2007 CY_{65}	—	February 8, 2007	Mount Lemmon	Mount Lemmon Survey	·	1.9 km	MPC · JPL
224909	2007 DN_{1}	—	February 17, 2007	Catalina	CSS	·	2.7 km	MPC · JPL
224910	2007 DW_{5}	—	February 17, 2007	Kitt Peak	Spacewatch	·	1.3 km	MPC · JPL
224911	2007 DS_{12}	—	February 16, 2007	Palomar	NEAT	·	760 m	MPC · JPL
224912	2007 DH_{13}	—	February 16, 2007	Palomar	NEAT	·	1.8 km	MPC · JPL
224913	2007 DF_{18}	—	February 17, 2007	Kitt Peak	Spacewatch	·	2.5 km	MPC · JPL
224914	2007 DY_{20}	—	February 17, 2007	Kitt Peak	Spacewatch	·	1.9 km	MPC · JPL
224915	2007 DA_{22}	—	February 17, 2007	Kitt Peak	Spacewatch	(5)	1.3 km	MPC · JPL
224916	2007 DQ_{24}	—	February 17, 2007	Kitt Peak	Spacewatch	·	1.9 km	MPC · JPL
224917	2007 DU_{27}	—	February 17, 2007	Kitt Peak	Spacewatch	KOR	2.0 km	MPC · JPL
224918	2007 DZ_{27}	—	February 17, 2007	Kitt Peak	Spacewatch	·	2.3 km	MPC · JPL
224919	2007 DH_{28}	—	February 17, 2007	Kitt Peak	Spacewatch	·	1.4 km	MPC · JPL
224920	2007 DQ_{30}	—	February 17, 2007	Kitt Peak	Spacewatch	MAS	920 m	MPC · JPL
224921	2007 DT_{32}	—	February 17, 2007	Kitt Peak	Spacewatch	·	2.2 km	MPC · JPL
224922	2007 DA_{36}	—	February 17, 2007	Kitt Peak	Spacewatch	·	2.0 km	MPC · JPL
224923	2007 DZ_{36}	—	February 17, 2007	Kitt Peak	Spacewatch	EOS	2.5 km	MPC · JPL
224924	2007 DN_{37}	—	February 17, 2007	Kitt Peak	Spacewatch	EOS	2.6 km	MPC · JPL
224925	2007 DM_{39}	—	February 17, 2007	Kitt Peak	Spacewatch	KOR	2.3 km	MPC · JPL
224926	2007 DA_{41}	—	February 22, 2007	Siding Spring	SSS	APO +1km	1.1 km	MPC · JPL
224927	2007 DF_{42}	—	February 16, 2007	Palomar	NEAT	NYS ·	1.5 km	MPC · JPL
224928	2007 DK_{42}	—	February 16, 2007	Palomar	NEAT	·	1.7 km	MPC · JPL
224929	2007 DH_{50}	—	February 16, 2007	Palomar	NEAT	MAS	1.0 km	MPC · JPL
224930	2007 DT_{52}	—	February 19, 2007	Mount Lemmon	Mount Lemmon Survey	·	1.9 km	MPC · JPL
224931	2007 DJ_{56}	—	February 21, 2007	Mount Lemmon	Mount Lemmon Survey	·	1.1 km	MPC · JPL
224932	2007 DR_{57}	—	February 21, 2007	Kitt Peak	Spacewatch	·	2.9 km	MPC · JPL
224933	2007 DF_{60}	—	February 21, 2007	Kitt Peak	Spacewatch	·	3.1 km	MPC · JPL
224934	2007 DM_{60}	—	February 22, 2007	Anderson Mesa	LONEOS	·	2.5 km	MPC · JPL
224935	2007 DD_{61}	—	February 19, 2007	Farra d'Isonzo	Farra d'Isonzo	JUN	1.6 km	MPC · JPL
224936	2007 DX_{64}	—	February 21, 2007	Kitt Peak	Spacewatch	·	2.3 km	MPC · JPL
224937	2007 DB_{65}	—	February 21, 2007	Kitt Peak	Spacewatch	·	1.1 km	MPC · JPL
224938	2007 DX_{69}	—	February 21, 2007	Kitt Peak	Spacewatch	·	2.2 km	MPC · JPL
224939	2007 DG_{71}	—	February 21, 2007	Kitt Peak	Spacewatch	·	2.8 km	MPC · JPL
224940	2007 DE_{73}	—	February 21, 2007	Kitt Peak	Spacewatch	·	2.9 km	MPC · JPL
224941	2007 DB_{74}	—	February 21, 2007	Kitt Peak	Spacewatch	MAS	780 m	MPC · JPL
224942	2007 DG_{76}	—	February 21, 2007	Mount Lemmon	Mount Lemmon Survey	·	1.5 km	MPC · JPL
224943	2007 DZ_{87}	—	February 23, 2007	Kitt Peak	Spacewatch	·	2.5 km	MPC · JPL
224944	2007 DY_{98}	—	February 25, 2007	Mount Lemmon	Mount Lemmon Survey	NYS	1.6 km	MPC · JPL
224945	2007 DH_{102}	—	February 24, 2007	Mount Nyukasa	Japan Aerospace Exploration Agency	MAS	960 m	MPC · JPL
224946	2007 DF_{106}	—	February 25, 2007	Mount Lemmon	Mount Lemmon Survey	KOR	2.1 km	MPC · JPL
224947	2007 DU_{110}	—	February 22, 2007	Kitt Peak	Spacewatch	·	2.0 km	MPC · JPL
224948	2007 DD_{111}	—	February 23, 2007	Mount Lemmon	Mount Lemmon Survey	·	2.9 km	MPC · JPL
224949	2007 DA_{113}	—	February 17, 2007	Kitt Peak	Spacewatch	AST	2.2 km	MPC · JPL
224950	2007 DX_{115}	—	February 23, 2007	Catalina	CSS	EUN	1.3 km	MPC · JPL
224951	2007 EA_{1}	—	March 3, 2007	Nanchuan	Nanchuan	ADE	3.9 km	MPC · JPL
224952	2007 EN_{3}	—	March 9, 2007	Catalina	CSS	·	1.8 km	MPC · JPL
224953	2007 ER_{5}	—	March 9, 2007	Mount Lemmon	Mount Lemmon Survey	(11882)	2.1 km	MPC · JPL
224954	2007 EK_{9}	—	March 9, 2007	Mount Lemmon	Mount Lemmon Survey	·	4.4 km	MPC · JPL
224955	2007 EU_{11}	—	March 9, 2007	Kitt Peak	Spacewatch	·	4.4 km	MPC · JPL
224956	2007 ER_{12}	—	March 9, 2007	Catalina	CSS	·	2.2 km	MPC · JPL
224957	2007 EA_{13}	—	March 9, 2007	Catalina	CSS	·	1.7 km	MPC · JPL
224958	2007 EM_{18}	—	March 9, 2007	Palomar	NEAT	·	2.8 km	MPC · JPL
224959	2007 EF_{19}	—	March 10, 2007	Kitt Peak	Spacewatch	MAS	850 m	MPC · JPL
224960	2007 EC_{23}	—	March 10, 2007	Mount Lemmon	Mount Lemmon Survey	HYG	3.9 km	MPC · JPL
224961	2007 EF_{23}	—	March 10, 2007	Mount Lemmon	Mount Lemmon Survey	·	2.3 km	MPC · JPL
224962 Michaelgrünewald	2007 ER_{26}	Michaelgrünewald	March 11, 2007	Wildberg	R. Apitzsch	·	1.8 km	MPC · JPL
224963	2007 EK_{31}	—	March 10, 2007	Kitt Peak	Spacewatch	·	2.4 km	MPC · JPL
224964	2007 EG_{36}	—	March 11, 2007	Catalina	CSS	·	2.2 km	MPC · JPL
224965	2007 ES_{42}	—	March 9, 2007	Kitt Peak	Spacewatch	·	5.5 km	MPC · JPL
224966	2007 EF_{43}	—	March 9, 2007	Kitt Peak	Spacewatch	EOS	2.8 km	MPC · JPL
224967	2007 EL_{47}	—	March 9, 2007	Palomar	NEAT	·	2.0 km	MPC · JPL
224968	2007 EX_{48}	—	March 9, 2007	Kitt Peak	Spacewatch	·	3.9 km	MPC · JPL
224969	2007 EE_{49}	—	March 9, 2007	Kitt Peak	Spacewatch	·	4.3 km	MPC · JPL
224970	2007 EE_{52}	—	March 11, 2007	Catalina	CSS	·	3.1 km	MPC · JPL
224971	2007 ER_{53}	—	March 11, 2007	Mount Lemmon	Mount Lemmon Survey	·	3.8 km	MPC · JPL
224972	2007 ES_{53}	—	March 11, 2007	Mount Lemmon	Mount Lemmon Survey	·	4.5 km	MPC · JPL
224973	2007 EC_{54}	—	March 11, 2007	Mount Lemmon	Mount Lemmon Survey	EOS	3.2 km	MPC · JPL
224974	2007 ED_{54}	—	March 11, 2007	Mount Lemmon	Mount Lemmon Survey	·	2.9 km	MPC · JPL
224975	2007 EV_{57}	—	March 9, 2007	Catalina	CSS	·	2.7 km	MPC · JPL
224976	2007 EV_{65}	—	March 10, 2007	Kitt Peak	Spacewatch	HOF	4.1 km	MPC · JPL
224977	2007 ER_{66}	—	March 10, 2007	Kitt Peak	Spacewatch	HYG	3.9 km	MPC · JPL
224978	2007 EF_{70}	—	March 10, 2007	Kitt Peak	Spacewatch	·	2.5 km	MPC · JPL
224979	2007 EW_{70}	—	March 10, 2007	Kitt Peak	Spacewatch	·	2.4 km	MPC · JPL
224980	2007 EJ_{74}	—	March 10, 2007	Kitt Peak	Spacewatch	KOR	1.9 km	MPC · JPL
224981	2007 EJ_{80}	—	March 10, 2007	Mount Lemmon	Mount Lemmon Survey	·	2.1 km	MPC · JPL
224982	2007 ER_{80}	—	March 11, 2007	Kitt Peak	Spacewatch	NYS	1.5 km	MPC · JPL
224983	2007 EX_{80}	—	March 11, 2007	Kitt Peak	Spacewatch	·	1.5 km	MPC · JPL
224984	2007 EW_{85}	—	March 12, 2007	Catalina	CSS	EUP	4.5 km	MPC · JPL
224985	2007 EA_{94}	—	March 10, 2007	Mount Lemmon	Mount Lemmon Survey	·	2.4 km	MPC · JPL
224986	2007 EQ_{94}	—	March 10, 2007	Mount Lemmon	Mount Lemmon Survey	MAS	780 m	MPC · JPL
224987	2007 ED_{97}	—	March 10, 2007	Mount Lemmon	Mount Lemmon Survey	·	3.0 km	MPC · JPL
224988	2007 ET_{104}	—	March 11, 2007	Mount Lemmon	Mount Lemmon Survey	MAS	720 m	MPC · JPL
224989	2007 EE_{107}	—	March 11, 2007	Kitt Peak	Spacewatch	·	3.0 km	MPC · JPL
224990	2007 EY_{110}	—	March 11, 2007	Kitt Peak	Spacewatch	EOS	3.2 km	MPC · JPL
224991	2007 EH_{111}	—	March 11, 2007	Kitt Peak	Spacewatch	·	1.4 km	MPC · JPL
224992	2007 EV_{112}	—	March 11, 2007	Kitt Peak	Spacewatch	·	2.8 km	MPC · JPL
224993	2007 EM_{127}	—	March 9, 2007	Mount Lemmon	Mount Lemmon Survey	·	2.3 km	MPC · JPL
224994	2007 EN_{128}	—	March 9, 2007	Mount Lemmon	Mount Lemmon Survey	·	1.4 km	MPC · JPL
224995	2007 EO_{130}	—	March 9, 2007	Mount Lemmon	Mount Lemmon Survey	THM	3.1 km	MPC · JPL
224996	2007 EV_{130}	—	March 9, 2007	Mount Lemmon	Mount Lemmon Survey	·	2.3 km	MPC · JPL
224997	2007 EO_{134}	—	March 10, 2007	Palomar	NEAT	·	1.5 km	MPC · JPL
224998	2007 EU_{135}	—	March 10, 2007	Mount Lemmon	Mount Lemmon Survey	·	2.5 km	MPC · JPL
224999	2007 EE_{138}	—	March 12, 2007	Kitt Peak	Spacewatch	NYS	1.6 km	MPC · JPL
225000	2007 EL_{141}	—	March 12, 2007	Kitt Peak	Spacewatch	·	4.4 km	MPC · JPL

back to top

== See also ==
- Meanings of minor-planet names: 224001–225000
