= List of minor planets: 225001–226000 =

The following is a partial list of minor planets, running from minor-planet number 225001 through 226000, inclusive. The primary data for this and other partial lists is based on JPL's "Small-Body Orbital Elements" and data available from the Minor Planet Center. Critical list information is also provided by the MPC, unless otherwise specified from Lowell Observatory. A detailed description of the table's columns and additional sources are given on the main page including a complete list of every page in this series, and a statistical break-up on the dynamical classification of minor planets.

Also see the summary list of all named bodies in numerical and alphabetical order, and the corresponding naming citations for the number range of this particular list. New namings may only be added to this list after official publication, as the preannouncement of names is condemned by the Working Group for Small Bodies Nomenclature of the International Astronomical Union.

Near-Earth obj.	MBA (inner)	MBA (outer)	Centaur
Mars-crosser	MBA (middle)	Jupiter trojan	Trans-Neptunian obj.
Unclassified

== 225001–225100 ==
Designation			Discovery			Properties		Ref
Permanent	Provisional	Named after	Date	Site	Discoverer(s)	Category	Diam.	Ref
225001	2007 EL_{149}	—	March 12, 2007	Mount Lemmon	Mount Lemmon Survey	PHO	1.2 km	MPC · JPL
225002	2007 ED_{154}	—	March 12, 2007	Kitt Peak	Spacewatch	HNS	2.4 km	MPC · JPL
225003	2007 EC_{165}	—	March 15, 2007	Socorro	LINEAR	·	4.7 km	MPC · JPL
225004	2007 EM_{166}	—	March 11, 2007	Catalina	CSS	·	2.4 km	MPC · JPL
225005	2007 EW_{166}	—	March 11, 2007	Mount Lemmon	Mount Lemmon Survey	HYG	4.2 km	MPC · JPL
225006	2007 EB_{167}	—	March 11, 2007	Kitt Peak	Spacewatch	·	2.0 km	MPC · JPL
225007	2007 EJ_{167}	—	March 12, 2007	Kitt Peak	Spacewatch	NYS	1.3 km	MPC · JPL
225008	2007 EL_{167}	—	March 12, 2007	Catalina	CSS	·	3.1 km	MPC · JPL
225009	2007 ED_{169}	—	March 13, 2007	Kitt Peak	Spacewatch	·	3.7 km	MPC · JPL
225010	2007 EA_{181}	—	March 14, 2007	Kitt Peak	Spacewatch	·	4.1 km	MPC · JPL
225011	2007 EV_{181}	—	March 14, 2007	Kitt Peak	Spacewatch	EOS	2.8 km	MPC · JPL
225012	2007 EP_{184}	—	March 12, 2007	Črni Vrh	Matičič, S.	·	2.5 km	MPC · JPL
225013	2007 EQ_{188}	—	March 13, 2007	Mount Lemmon	Mount Lemmon Survey	·	2.1 km	MPC · JPL
225014	2007 ET_{188}	—	March 13, 2007	Mount Lemmon	Mount Lemmon Survey	WIT	1.3 km	MPC · JPL
225015	2007 EG_{196}	—	March 15, 2007	Kitt Peak	Spacewatch	·	4.2 km	MPC · JPL
225016	2007 EE_{202}	—	March 9, 2007	Kitt Peak	Spacewatch	·	2.4 km	MPC · JPL
225017	2007 EB_{204}	—	March 10, 2007	Mount Lemmon	Mount Lemmon Survey	·	1.8 km	MPC · JPL
225018	2007 EJ_{206}	—	March 13, 2007	Anderson Mesa	LONEOS	ERI	2.3 km	MPC · JPL
225019	2007 EO_{214}	—	March 10, 2007	Mount Lemmon	Mount Lemmon Survey	·	3.4 km	MPC · JPL
225020	2007 EX_{218}	—	March 12, 2007	Kitt Peak	Spacewatch	·	2.4 km	MPC · JPL
225021	2007 FL	—	March 16, 2007	Mount Lemmon	Mount Lemmon Survey	·	3.8 km	MPC · JPL
225022	2007 FB_{12}	—	March 17, 2007	Socorro	LINEAR	MIS	3.1 km	MPC · JPL
225023	2007 FF_{15}	—	March 16, 2007	Kitt Peak	Spacewatch	·	4.8 km	MPC · JPL
225024	2007 FK_{15}	—	March 17, 2007	Anderson Mesa	LONEOS	·	2.0 km	MPC · JPL
225025	2007 FX_{18}	—	March 20, 2007	Mount Lemmon	Mount Lemmon Survey	·	1.6 km	MPC · JPL
225026	2007 FB_{20}	—	March 20, 2007	Anderson Mesa	LONEOS	·	2.6 km	MPC · JPL
225027	2007 FE_{21}	—	March 20, 2007	Mount Lemmon	Mount Lemmon Survey	·	1.5 km	MPC · JPL
225028	2007 FU_{22}	—	March 20, 2007	Kitt Peak	Spacewatch	EOS	3.0 km	MPC · JPL
225029	2007 FU_{24}	—	March 20, 2007	Mount Lemmon	Mount Lemmon Survey	·	3.8 km	MPC · JPL
225030	2007 FN_{25}	—	March 20, 2007	Kitt Peak	Spacewatch	KOR	1.4 km	MPC · JPL
225031	2007 FA_{26}	—	March 20, 2007	Mount Lemmon	Mount Lemmon Survey	·	2.4 km	MPC · JPL
225032	2007 FH_{29}	—	March 20, 2007	Mount Lemmon	Mount Lemmon Survey	·	1.9 km	MPC · JPL
225033 Maskoliūnas	2007 FM_{35}	Maskoliūnas	March 23, 2007	Moletai	K. Černis, J. Zdanavičius	GEF	2.1 km	MPC · JPL
225034	2007 FY_{39}	—	March 17, 2007	Anderson Mesa	LONEOS	·	4.1 km	MPC · JPL
225035	2007 FB_{42}	—	March 26, 2007	Mount Lemmon	Mount Lemmon Survey	·	1.4 km	MPC · JPL
225036	2007 FJ_{42}	—	March 26, 2007	Mount Lemmon	Mount Lemmon Survey	·	1.0 km	MPC · JPL
225037	2007 FR_{43}	—	March 16, 2007	Mount Lemmon	Mount Lemmon Survey	THM	2.8 km	MPC · JPL
225038	2007 GT_{2}	—	April 7, 2007	Mount Lemmon	Mount Lemmon Survey	·	980 m	MPC · JPL
225039	2007 GY_{4}	—	April 11, 2007	7300	W. K. Y. Yeung	·	3.2 km	MPC · JPL
225040	2007 GO_{5}	—	April 14, 2007	Vail-Jarnac	Jarnac	·	3.0 km	MPC · JPL
225041	2007 GR_{7}	—	April 7, 2007	Mount Lemmon	Mount Lemmon Survey	·	4.6 km	MPC · JPL
225042	2007 GQ_{9}	—	April 8, 2007	Siding Spring	SSS	·	3.4 km	MPC · JPL
225043	2007 GN_{11}	—	April 11, 2007	Kitt Peak	Spacewatch	·	4.5 km	MPC · JPL
225044	2007 GT_{14}	—	April 11, 2007	Kitt Peak	Spacewatch	·	3.5 km	MPC · JPL
225045	2007 GE_{16}	—	April 11, 2007	Kitt Peak	Spacewatch	·	3.1 km	MPC · JPL
225046	2007 GY_{16}	—	April 11, 2007	Kitt Peak	Spacewatch	EMA	3.3 km	MPC · JPL
225047	2007 GN_{18}	—	April 11, 2007	Kitt Peak	Spacewatch	·	2.9 km	MPC · JPL
225048	2007 GV_{18}	—	April 11, 2007	Kitt Peak	Spacewatch	·	6.0 km	MPC · JPL
225049	2007 GV_{24}	—	April 11, 2007	Siding Spring	SSS	·	6.0 km	MPC · JPL
225050	2007 GF_{41}	—	April 14, 2007	Kitt Peak	Spacewatch	·	4.2 km	MPC · JPL
225051	2007 GN_{41}	—	April 14, 2007	Kitt Peak	Spacewatch	TIR	5.3 km	MPC · JPL
225052	2007 GV_{45}	—	April 14, 2007	Kitt Peak	Spacewatch	·	3.4 km	MPC · JPL
225053	2007 GP_{58}	—	April 15, 2007	Mount Lemmon	Mount Lemmon Survey	·	2.4 km	MPC · JPL
225054	2007 GY_{61}	—	April 15, 2007	Catalina	CSS	BRG	1.9 km	MPC · JPL
225055	2007 GE_{73}	—	April 15, 2007	Catalina	CSS	·	2.8 km	MPC · JPL
225056	2007 GL_{73}	—	April 15, 2007	Catalina	CSS	EOS	3.0 km	MPC · JPL
225057	2007 HK	—	April 16, 2007	Altschwendt	W. Ries	KOR	1.6 km	MPC · JPL
225058	2007 HG_{3}	—	April 16, 2007	Mount Lemmon	Mount Lemmon Survey	·	3.5 km	MPC · JPL
225059	2007 HJ_{3}	—	April 16, 2007	Catalina	CSS	·	4.7 km	MPC · JPL
225060	2007 HG_{4}	—	April 16, 2007	7300	W. K. Y. Yeung	CYB	5.7 km	MPC · JPL
225061	2007 HV_{10}	—	April 18, 2007	Mount Lemmon	Mount Lemmon Survey	·	3.2 km	MPC · JPL
225062	2007 HS_{11}	—	April 18, 2007	Mount Lemmon	Mount Lemmon Survey	·	2.0 km	MPC · JPL
225063	2007 HG_{16}	—	April 20, 2007	Lulin	LUSS	·	4.3 km	MPC · JPL
225064	2007 HS_{27}	—	April 18, 2007	Kitt Peak	Spacewatch	·	4.5 km	MPC · JPL
225065	2007 HE_{33}	—	April 19, 2007	Mount Lemmon	Mount Lemmon Survey	·	2.3 km	MPC · JPL
225066	2007 HN_{44}	—	April 16, 2007	Catalina	CSS	·	2.7 km	MPC · JPL
225067	2007 HR_{47}	—	April 20, 2007	Kitt Peak	Spacewatch	·	4.6 km	MPC · JPL
225068	2007 HE_{59}	—	April 18, 2007	Mount Lemmon	Mount Lemmon Survey	KOR	1.7 km	MPC · JPL
225069	2007 HM_{60}	—	April 20, 2007	Mount Lemmon	Mount Lemmon Survey	·	3.2 km	MPC · JPL
225070	2007 HM_{62}	—	April 22, 2007	Mount Lemmon	Mount Lemmon Survey	·	3.9 km	MPC · JPL
225071	2007 HE_{70}	—	April 25, 2007	Tiki	S. F. Hönig, Teamo, N.	·	3.8 km	MPC · JPL
225072	2007 HT_{84}	—	April 22, 2007	Kitt Peak	Spacewatch	·	3.9 km	MPC · JPL
225073	2007 HK_{90}	—	April 23, 2007	Catalina	CSS	·	2.8 km	MPC · JPL
225074	2007 HH_{91}	—	April 18, 2007	Mount Lemmon	Mount Lemmon Survey	·	2.9 km	MPC · JPL
225075	2007 HT_{95}	—	April 19, 2007	Mount Lemmon	Mount Lemmon Survey	·	2.8 km	MPC · JPL
225076 Vallemare	2007 JT_{2}	Vallemare	May 8, 2007	Vallemare Borbona	V. S. Casulli	·	5.1 km	MPC · JPL
225077	2007 JA_{4}	—	May 7, 2007	Kitt Peak	Spacewatch	EOS	3.0 km	MPC · JPL
225078	2007 JM_{4}	—	May 7, 2007	Catalina	CSS	GEF	2.0 km	MPC · JPL
225079	2007 JF_{19}	—	May 10, 2007	Kitt Peak	Spacewatch	·	3.2 km	MPC · JPL
225080	2007 JA_{23}	—	May 13, 2007	Tiki	S. F. Hönig, Teamo, N.	·	5.2 km	MPC · JPL
225081	2007 JH_{25}	—	May 9, 2007	Mount Lemmon	Mount Lemmon Survey	·	2.8 km	MPC · JPL
225082	2007 JL_{28}	—	May 10, 2007	Mount Lemmon	Mount Lemmon Survey	·	4.6 km	MPC · JPL
225083	2007 KZ_{5}	—	May 24, 2007	Mount Lemmon	Mount Lemmon Survey	TEL	2.1 km	MPC · JPL
225084	2007 KK_{6}	—	May 25, 2007	Mount Lemmon	Mount Lemmon Survey	·	6.2 km	MPC · JPL
225085	2007 LB_{1}	—	June 8, 2007	Kitt Peak	Spacewatch	EOS	2.3 km	MPC · JPL
225086	2007 LB_{3}	—	June 8, 2007	Kitt Peak	Spacewatch	·	4.3 km	MPC · JPL
225087	2007 LZ_{8}	—	June 8, 2007	Catalina	CSS	·	4.6 km	MPC · JPL
225088 Gonggong	2007 OR_{10}	Gonggong	July 17, 2007	Palomar	M. E. Schwamb, M. E. Brown, D. L. Rabinowitz	res · 3:10 · moon	1535 km	MPC · JPL
225089	2007 PG_{28}	—	August 14, 2007	Bisei SG Center	BATTeRS	L4	20 km	MPC · JPL
225090	2007 TH_{10}	—	October 6, 2007	Socorro	LINEAR	WIT	1.5 km	MPC · JPL
225091	2007 TJ_{350}	—	October 14, 2007	Mount Lemmon	Mount Lemmon Survey	L4	10 km	MPC · JPL
225092	2008 AW_{27}	—	January 10, 2008	Mount Lemmon	Mount Lemmon Survey	NYS	1.2 km	MPC · JPL
225093	2008 AF_{115}	—	January 10, 2008	Mount Lemmon	Mount Lemmon Survey	·	720 m	MPC · JPL
225094	2008 CU_{25}	—	February 1, 2008	Kitt Peak	Spacewatch	·	1.7 km	MPC · JPL
225095	2008 CD_{140}	—	February 8, 2008	Kitt Peak	Spacewatch	·	860 m	MPC · JPL
225096 Kovácsgéza	2008 DU	Kovácsgéza	February 24, 2008	Piszkéstető	K. Sárneczky	·	2.4 km	MPC · JPL
225097	2008 DX_{14}	—	February 26, 2008	Mount Lemmon	Mount Lemmon Survey	·	990 m	MPC · JPL
225098	2008 DB_{16}	—	February 27, 2008	Kitt Peak	Spacewatch	·	1.0 km	MPC · JPL
225099	2008 DM_{32}	—	February 27, 2008	Kitt Peak	Spacewatch	·	910 m	MPC · JPL
225100	2008 DE_{35}	—	February 27, 2008	Kitt Peak	Spacewatch	·	950 m	MPC · JPL

== 225101–225200 ==
back to top

Designation			Discovery			Properties		Ref
Permanent	Provisional	Named after	Date	Site	Discoverer(s)	Category	Diam.	Ref
225101	2008 DS_{35}	—	February 27, 2008	Kitt Peak	Spacewatch	V	1.1 km	MPC · JPL
225102	2008 DD_{39}	—	February 27, 2008	Mount Lemmon	Mount Lemmon Survey	·	830 m	MPC · JPL
225103	2008 DL_{40}	—	February 27, 2008	Kitt Peak	Spacewatch	·	1.3 km	MPC · JPL
225104	2008 DZ_{66}	—	February 29, 2008	Kitt Peak	Spacewatch	·	2.4 km	MPC · JPL
225105	2008 DX_{67}	—	February 29, 2008	Kitt Peak	Spacewatch	·	850 m	MPC · JPL
225106	2008 DN_{68}	—	February 29, 2008	Kitt Peak	Spacewatch	·	2.4 km	MPC · JPL
225107	2008 DD_{69}	—	February 29, 2008	Kitt Peak	Spacewatch	·	1.4 km	MPC · JPL
225108	2008 DQ_{69}	—	February 29, 2008	Kitt Peak	Spacewatch	·	1.1 km	MPC · JPL
225109	2008 DC_{76}	—	February 28, 2008	Mount Lemmon	Mount Lemmon Survey	(2076)	1.0 km	MPC · JPL
225110	2008 DP_{82}	—	February 28, 2008	Kitt Peak	Spacewatch	PHO	1.1 km	MPC · JPL
225111	2008 ED	—	March 1, 2008	Mount Lemmon	Mount Lemmon Survey	H	640 m	MPC · JPL
225112	2008 EH_{4}	—	March 2, 2008	Kitt Peak	Spacewatch	·	780 m	MPC · JPL
225113	2008 EL_{9}	—	March 9, 2008	Socorro	LINEAR	H	830 m	MPC · JPL
225114	2008 EY_{14}	—	March 1, 2008	Kitt Peak	Spacewatch	·	1.6 km	MPC · JPL
225115	2008 EY_{41}	—	March 4, 2008	Kitt Peak	Spacewatch	V	820 m	MPC · JPL
225116	2008 EE_{45}	—	March 5, 2008	Kitt Peak	Spacewatch	·	1.3 km	MPC · JPL
225117	2008 EX_{45}	—	March 5, 2008	Kitt Peak	Spacewatch	V	1.0 km	MPC · JPL
225118	2008 EF_{76}	—	March 7, 2008	Mount Lemmon	Mount Lemmon Survey	·	1.3 km	MPC · JPL
225119	2008 EV_{77}	—	March 7, 2008	Kitt Peak	Spacewatch	NYS	1.2 km	MPC · JPL
225120	2008 EE_{82}	—	March 5, 2008	Socorro	LINEAR	·	1.7 km	MPC · JPL
225121	2008 ES_{100}	—	March 6, 2008	Mount Lemmon	Mount Lemmon Survey	H	800 m	MPC · JPL
225122	2008 EK_{123}	—	March 9, 2008	Kitt Peak	Spacewatch	·	770 m	MPC · JPL
225123	2008 EV_{131}	—	March 11, 2008	Kitt Peak	Spacewatch	·	910 m	MPC · JPL
225124	2008 EZ_{134}	—	March 11, 2008	Kitt Peak	Spacewatch	NYS	1.5 km	MPC · JPL
225125	2008 EP_{137}	—	March 11, 2008	Kitt Peak	Spacewatch	NYS	950 m	MPC · JPL
225126	2008 EE_{149}	—	March 3, 2008	Kitt Peak	Spacewatch	·	800 m	MPC · JPL
225127	2008 FP_{10}	—	March 26, 2008	Kitt Peak	Spacewatch	·	1.1 km	MPC · JPL
225128	2008 FH_{40}	—	March 28, 2008	Kitt Peak	Spacewatch	·	1.1 km	MPC · JPL
225129	2008 FR_{55}	—	March 28, 2008	Mount Lemmon	Mount Lemmon Survey	·	1.6 km	MPC · JPL
225130	2008 FK_{59}	—	March 29, 2008	Kitt Peak	Spacewatch	·	910 m	MPC · JPL
225131	2008 FF_{67}	—	March 28, 2008	Kitt Peak	Spacewatch	·	1.6 km	MPC · JPL
225132	2008 FC_{68}	—	March 28, 2008	Mount Lemmon	Mount Lemmon Survey	·	1.3 km	MPC · JPL
225133	2008 FK_{69}	—	March 28, 2008	Mount Lemmon	Mount Lemmon Survey	EUN	1.5 km	MPC · JPL
225134	2008 FJ_{70}	—	March 28, 2008	Kitt Peak	Spacewatch	·	1.6 km	MPC · JPL
225135	2008 FC_{79}	—	March 27, 2008	Mount Lemmon	Mount Lemmon Survey	·	1.1 km	MPC · JPL
225136	2008 FT_{94}	—	March 29, 2008	Kitt Peak	Spacewatch	(5)	1.5 km	MPC · JPL
225137	2008 FW_{94}	—	March 29, 2008	Kitt Peak	Spacewatch	·	1.7 km	MPC · JPL
225138	2008 FT_{98}	—	March 30, 2008	Catalina	CSS	PHO	1.6 km	MPC · JPL
225139	2008 FY_{99}	—	March 30, 2008	Kitt Peak	Spacewatch	·	1.9 km	MPC · JPL
225140	2008 FC_{101}	—	March 30, 2008	Kitt Peak	Spacewatch	·	1.5 km	MPC · JPL
225141	2008 FX_{102}	—	March 30, 2008	Kitt Peak	Spacewatch	·	1.7 km	MPC · JPL
225142	2008 FE_{107}	—	March 31, 2008	Kitt Peak	Spacewatch	MAS	810 m	MPC · JPL
225143	2008 FW_{123}	—	March 29, 2008	Kitt Peak	Spacewatch	·	830 m	MPC · JPL
225144	2008 FT_{128}	—	March 29, 2008	Mount Lemmon	Mount Lemmon Survey	·	1.8 km	MPC · JPL
225145	2008 GC	—	April 1, 2008	Vail-Jarnac	Jarnac	·	1.1 km	MPC · JPL
225146	2008 GQ_{1}	—	April 2, 2008	La Sagra	OAM	·	1.4 km	MPC · JPL
225147	2008 GQ_{8}	—	April 1, 2008	Mount Lemmon	Mount Lemmon Survey	·	950 m	MPC · JPL
225148	2008 GC_{23}	—	April 1, 2008	Mount Lemmon	Mount Lemmon Survey	·	2.1 km	MPC · JPL
225149	2008 GV_{23}	—	April 1, 2008	Mount Lemmon	Mount Lemmon Survey	·	1.4 km	MPC · JPL
225150	2008 GR_{46}	—	April 4, 2008	Kitt Peak	Spacewatch	VER	3.8 km	MPC · JPL
225151	2008 GN_{47}	—	April 4, 2008	Kitt Peak	Spacewatch	·	4.6 km	MPC · JPL
225152	2008 GB_{52}	—	April 5, 2008	Mount Lemmon	Mount Lemmon Survey	·	1.2 km	MPC · JPL
225153	2008 GK_{64}	—	April 5, 2008	Kitt Peak	Spacewatch	·	2.2 km	MPC · JPL
225154	2008 GK_{65}	—	April 6, 2008	Kitt Peak	Spacewatch	·	1.1 km	MPC · JPL
225155	2008 GO_{65}	—	April 6, 2008	Kitt Peak	Spacewatch	(2076)	880 m	MPC · JPL
225156	2008 GG_{67}	—	April 6, 2008	Kitt Peak	Spacewatch	·	930 m	MPC · JPL
225157	2008 GP_{69}	—	April 6, 2008	Mount Lemmon	Mount Lemmon Survey	·	2.5 km	MPC · JPL
225158	2008 GP_{77}	—	April 7, 2008	Kitt Peak	Spacewatch	·	1.4 km	MPC · JPL
225159	2008 GF_{83}	—	April 8, 2008	Kitt Peak	Spacewatch	·	2.7 km	MPC · JPL
225160	2008 GL_{96}	—	April 8, 2008	Kitt Peak	Spacewatch	V	1.1 km	MPC · JPL
225161	2008 GS_{97}	—	April 8, 2008	Kitt Peak	Spacewatch	·	820 m	MPC · JPL
225162	2008 GY_{99}	—	April 9, 2008	Kitt Peak	Spacewatch	·	1.2 km	MPC · JPL
225163	2008 GH_{102}	—	April 10, 2008	Kitt Peak	Spacewatch	MAR	1.3 km	MPC · JPL
225164	2008 GC_{114}	—	April 9, 2008	Kitt Peak	Spacewatch	·	2.2 km	MPC · JPL
225165	2008 GZ_{117}	—	April 11, 2008	Mount Lemmon	Mount Lemmon Survey	·	1.0 km	MPC · JPL
225166	2008 GF_{119}	—	April 11, 2008	Kitt Peak	Spacewatch	MAS	900 m	MPC · JPL
225167	2008 GR_{121}	—	April 13, 2008	Kitt Peak	Spacewatch	V	800 m	MPC · JPL
225168	2008 GN_{129}	—	April 3, 2008	Kitt Peak	Spacewatch	V	550 m	MPC · JPL
225169	2008 GK_{130}	—	April 5, 2008	Kitt Peak	Spacewatch	·	710 m	MPC · JPL
225170	2008 GA_{141}	—	April 14, 2008	Kitt Peak	Spacewatch	·	930 m	MPC · JPL
225171	2008 HC_{1}	—	April 24, 2008	Kitt Peak	Spacewatch	·	1.7 km	MPC · JPL
225172	2008 HC_{3}	—	April 25, 2008	Kitt Peak	Spacewatch	H	700 m	MPC · JPL
225173	2008 HW_{3}	—	April 28, 2008	La Sagra	OAM	·	1.3 km	MPC · JPL
225174	2008 HO_{5}	—	April 24, 2008	Kitt Peak	Spacewatch	NYS	1.2 km	MPC · JPL
225175	2008 HG_{11}	—	April 24, 2008	Kitt Peak	Spacewatch	EUN	1.6 km	MPC · JPL
225176	2008 HV_{18}	—	April 26, 2008	Mount Lemmon	Mount Lemmon Survey	·	1.9 km	MPC · JPL
225177	2008 HP_{32}	—	April 29, 2008	Mount Lemmon	Mount Lemmon Survey	·	730 m	MPC · JPL
225178	2008 HL_{33}	—	April 25, 2008	Kitt Peak	Spacewatch	·	2.7 km	MPC · JPL
225179	2008 HF_{35}	—	April 28, 2008	Kitt Peak	Spacewatch	·	2.2 km	MPC · JPL
225180	2008 HN_{38}	—	April 25, 2008	Mount Lemmon	Mount Lemmon Survey	·	1.2 km	MPC · JPL
225181	2008 HB_{39}	—	April 26, 2008	Mount Lemmon	Mount Lemmon Survey	·	1.6 km	MPC · JPL
225182	2008 HU_{45}	—	April 28, 2008	Kitt Peak	Spacewatch	·	1.3 km	MPC · JPL
225183	2008 HO_{46}	—	April 28, 2008	Kitt Peak	Spacewatch	·	2.0 km	MPC · JPL
225184	2008 HX_{54}	—	April 29, 2008	Kitt Peak	Spacewatch	·	1.2 km	MPC · JPL
225185	2008 HC_{56}	—	April 29, 2008	Kitt Peak	Spacewatch	TIR	5.3 km	MPC · JPL
225186	2008 HQ_{58}	—	April 30, 2008	Kitt Peak	Spacewatch	NYS	1.6 km	MPC · JPL
225187	2008 HM_{60}	—	April 28, 2008	Mount Lemmon	Mount Lemmon Survey	·	4.5 km	MPC · JPL
225188	2008 HG_{61}	—	April 30, 2008	Kitt Peak	Spacewatch	·	3.4 km	MPC · JPL
225189	2008 HG_{62}	—	April 30, 2008	Kitt Peak	Spacewatch	·	2.2 km	MPC · JPL
225190	2008 HG_{63}	—	April 29, 2008	Mount Lemmon	Mount Lemmon Survey	·	910 m	MPC · JPL
225191	2008 JZ_{1}	—	May 2, 2008	Mount Lemmon	Mount Lemmon Survey	·	1.9 km	MPC · JPL
225192	2008 JX_{5}	—	May 1, 2008	Catalina	CSS	·	3.5 km	MPC · JPL
225193	2008 JC_{12}	—	May 3, 2008	Kitt Peak	Spacewatch	·	1.2 km	MPC · JPL
225194	2008 JO_{12}	—	May 3, 2008	Kitt Peak	Spacewatch	·	2.2 km	MPC · JPL
225195	2008 JY_{13}	—	May 6, 2008	Mount Lemmon	Mount Lemmon Survey	·	1.9 km	MPC · JPL
225196	2008 JK_{17}	—	May 3, 2008	Mount Lemmon	Mount Lemmon Survey	·	2.7 km	MPC · JPL
225197	2008 JW_{18}	—	May 5, 2008	Mount Lemmon	Mount Lemmon Survey	·	1.2 km	MPC · JPL
225198	2008 JR_{25}	—	May 8, 2008	Kitt Peak	Spacewatch	PHO	1.5 km	MPC · JPL
225199	2008 JK_{28}	—	May 8, 2008	Kitt Peak	Spacewatch	·	990 m	MPC · JPL
225200	2008 JT_{34}	—	May 15, 2008	Kitt Peak	Spacewatch	GEF	1.3 km	MPC · JPL

== 225201–225300 ==
back to top

Designation			Discovery			Properties		Ref
Permanent	Provisional	Named after	Date	Site	Discoverer(s)	Category	Diam.	Ref
225201	2008 KT_{7}	—	May 27, 2008	Kitt Peak	Spacewatch	·	1.2 km	MPC · JPL
225202	2008 KE_{25}	—	May 29, 2008	Mount Lemmon	Mount Lemmon Survey	·	3.4 km	MPC · JPL
225203	2008 KM_{36}	—	May 29, 2008	Mount Lemmon	Mount Lemmon Survey	·	2.3 km	MPC · JPL
225204	2008 KN_{39}	—	May 30, 2008	Kitt Peak	Spacewatch	·	5.1 km	MPC · JPL
225205	2008 KO_{41}	—	May 31, 2008	Kitt Peak	Spacewatch	·	2.5 km	MPC · JPL
225206	2008 LP	—	June 1, 2008	Mount Lemmon	Mount Lemmon Survey	ADE	2.3 km	MPC · JPL
225207	2008 LG_{12}	—	June 8, 2008	Kitt Peak	Spacewatch	·	2.3 km	MPC · JPL
225208	2008 NM_{1}	—	July 4, 2008	Dauban	Kugel, F.	TEL	1.7 km	MPC · JPL
225209	2008 OT_{20}	—	July 29, 2008	Kitt Peak	Spacewatch	L4	10 km	MPC · JPL
225210	2008 QB_{31}	—	August 30, 2008	Socorro	LINEAR	L4	17 km	MPC · JPL
225211	2008 QG_{42}	—	August 23, 2008	Kitt Peak	Spacewatch	L4	10 km	MPC · JPL
225212	2008 RF_{25}	—	September 3, 2008	Goodricke-Pigott	R. A. Tucker	L4	12 km	MPC · JPL
225213	2008 RJ_{27}	—	September 8, 2008	Dauban	Kugel, F.	L4	16 km	MPC · JPL
225214	2008 RM_{58}	—	September 3, 2008	Kitt Peak	Spacewatch	L4	11 km	MPC · JPL
225215	2008 RB_{65}	—	September 4, 2008	Kitt Peak	Spacewatch	L4	10 km	MPC · JPL
225216	2008 RV_{76}	—	September 6, 2008	Catalina	CSS	L4	10 km	MPC · JPL
225217	2008 RA_{83}	—	September 4, 2008	Kitt Peak	Spacewatch	L4	10 km	MPC · JPL
225218	2008 RD_{95}	—	September 7, 2008	Mount Lemmon	Mount Lemmon Survey	L4	8.9 km	MPC · JPL
225219	2008 RO_{126}	—	September 4, 2008	Kitt Peak	Spacewatch	L4	10 km	MPC · JPL
225220	2008 RX_{128}	—	September 5, 2008	Kitt Peak	Spacewatch	L4	10 km	MPC · JPL
225221	2008 SN_{22}	—	September 19, 2008	Kitt Peak	Spacewatch	L4	9.6 km	MPC · JPL
225222	2008 SP_{32}	—	September 20, 2008	Kitt Peak	Spacewatch	L4 · (8060)	14 km	MPC · JPL
225223	2008 SV_{36}	—	September 20, 2008	Mount Lemmon	Mount Lemmon Survey	L4	9.5 km	MPC · JPL
225224	2008 SH_{41}	—	September 20, 2008	Catalina	CSS	L4	20 km	MPC · JPL
225225 Ninagrünewald	2008 SZ_{82}	Ninagrünewald	September 26, 2008	Wildberg	R. Apitzsch	·	4.7 km	MPC · JPL
225226	2008 SH_{213}	—	September 29, 2008	Mount Lemmon	Mount Lemmon Survey	L4	8.8 km	MPC · JPL
225227	2008 TO_{65}	—	October 2, 2008	Catalina	CSS	L4 · ERY	13 km	MPC · JPL
225228	2008 TE_{92}	—	October 4, 2008	La Sagra	OAM	L4	16 km	MPC · JPL
225229	2008 TB_{149}	—	October 9, 2008	Mount Lemmon	Mount Lemmon Survey	L4	10 km	MPC · JPL
225230	2008 UX_{4}	—	October 25, 2008	Kachina	Hobart, J.	L4	10 km	MPC · JPL
225231 Orhazoltán	2009 HE_{12}	Orhazoltán	April 18, 2009	Piszkéstető	K. Sárneczky	·	920 m	MPC · JPL
225232 Kircheva	2009 OD_{2}	Kircheva	July 21, 2009	Zvezdno Obshtestvo	Fratev, F.	·	1.3 km	MPC · JPL
225233	2009 OJ_{3}	—	July 20, 2009	La Sagra	OAM	·	2.7 km	MPC · JPL
225234	2009 PB_{1}	—	August 12, 2009	Socorro	LINEAR	·	1.2 km	MPC · JPL
225235	2009 PJ_{12}	—	August 15, 2009	Catalina	CSS	·	910 m	MPC · JPL
225236	2009 PP_{14}	—	August 15, 2009	Kitt Peak	Spacewatch	·	2.4 km	MPC · JPL
225237	2009 PV_{15}	—	August 15, 2009	Kitt Peak	Spacewatch	·	2.1 km	MPC · JPL
225238 Hristobotev	2009 QJ_{5}	Hristobotev	August 17, 2009	Zvezdno Obshtestvo	Fratev, F.	·	1.4 km	MPC · JPL
225239 Ruthproell	2009 QG_{8}	Ruthproell	August 19, 2009	Wildberg	R. Apitzsch	·	2.7 km	MPC · JPL
225240	2009 QY_{8}	—	August 20, 2009	Calvin-Rehoboth	L. A. Molnar	EOS	3.1 km	MPC · JPL
225241	2009 QO_{13}	—	August 16, 2009	Kitt Peak	Spacewatch	HOF	3.3 km	MPC · JPL
225242	2009 QL_{14}	—	August 16, 2009	Kitt Peak	Spacewatch	·	2.6 km	MPC · JPL
225243	2009 QU_{22}	—	August 20, 2009	La Sagra	OAM	VER	4.5 km	MPC · JPL
225244	2009 QE_{27}	—	August 23, 2009	Dauban	Kugel, F.	NYS	1.7 km	MPC · JPL
225245	2009 QC_{28}	—	August 19, 2009	Kitt Peak	Spacewatch	EUN	1.5 km	MPC · JPL
225246	2009 QX_{28}	—	August 23, 2009	La Sagra	OAM	·	1.8 km	MPC · JPL
225247	2009 QY_{32}	—	August 24, 2009	Črni Vrh	Matičič, S.	V	990 m	MPC · JPL
225248	2009 QJ_{33}	—	August 24, 2009	La Sagra	OAM	·	5.7 km	MPC · JPL
225249	2009 QT_{33}	—	August 26, 2009	Zvezdno Obshtestvo	Obshtestvo, Zvezdno	·	1.1 km	MPC · JPL
225250 Georgfranziska	2009 QU_{36}	Georgfranziska	August 30, 2009	Taunus	Karge, S., Zimmer, U.	·	2.2 km	MPC · JPL
225251	2009 QF_{44}	—	August 27, 2009	Kitt Peak	Spacewatch	·	2.5 km	MPC · JPL
225252	2009 QQ_{47}	—	August 28, 2009	La Sagra	OAM	·	900 m	MPC · JPL
225253	2009 RP_{1}	—	September 11, 2009	La Sagra	OAM	T_{j} (2.97)	5.1 km	MPC · JPL
225254 Flury	2009 RL_{2}	Flury	September 10, 2009	ESA OGS	Busch, M., Kresken, R.	·	2.4 km	MPC · JPL
225255	2009 RA_{3}	—	September 10, 2009	Catalina	CSS	NYS	1.3 km	MPC · JPL
225256	2009 RO_{3}	—	September 12, 2009	Socorro	LINEAR	·	930 m	MPC · JPL
225257	2009 RJ_{5}	—	September 10, 2009	Catalina	CSS	·	4.8 km	MPC · JPL
225258	2009 RL_{16}	—	September 12, 2009	Kitt Peak	Spacewatch	·	2.8 km	MPC · JPL
225259	2009 RH_{17}	—	September 12, 2009	Kitt Peak	Spacewatch	THM	2.8 km	MPC · JPL
225260	2009 RK_{17}	—	September 12, 2009	Kitt Peak	Spacewatch	·	3.8 km	MPC · JPL
225261	2009 RC_{24}	—	September 15, 2009	Kitt Peak	Spacewatch	·	2.7 km	MPC · JPL
225262	2009 RX_{26}	—	September 12, 2009	Kitt Peak	Spacewatch	·	1.4 km	MPC · JPL
225263	2009 RQ_{30}	—	September 14, 2009	Kitt Peak	Spacewatch	HOF	3.7 km	MPC · JPL
225264	2009 RT_{34}	—	September 14, 2009	Kitt Peak	Spacewatch	·	3.6 km	MPC · JPL
225265	2009 RD_{47}	—	September 15, 2009	Kitt Peak	Spacewatch	V	1.0 km	MPC · JPL
225266	2009 RN_{47}	—	September 15, 2009	Kitt Peak	Spacewatch	·	1.4 km	MPC · JPL
225267	2009 RS_{47}	—	September 15, 2009	Kitt Peak	Spacewatch	·	2.0 km	MPC · JPL
225268	2009 RT_{47}	—	September 15, 2009	Kitt Peak	Spacewatch	·	2.9 km	MPC · JPL
225269	2009 SO_{15}	—	September 19, 2009	Bisei SG Center	BATTeRS	·	1.5 km	MPC · JPL
225270	2009 SF_{30}	—	September 16, 2009	Kitt Peak	Spacewatch	·	820 m	MPC · JPL
225271	2009 SO_{61}	—	September 17, 2009	Kitt Peak	Spacewatch	NEM	2.9 km	MPC · JPL
225272	2009 SE_{76}	—	September 17, 2009	Kitt Peak	Spacewatch	·	2.3 km	MPC · JPL
225273	2128 P-L	—	September 26, 1960	Palomar	C. J. van Houten, I. van Houten-Groeneveld, T. Gehrels	·	1.5 km	MPC · JPL
225274	6781 P-L	—	September 24, 1960	Palomar	C. J. van Houten, I. van Houten-Groeneveld, T. Gehrels	·	3.9 km	MPC · JPL
225275	6890 P-L	—	September 24, 1960	Palomar	C. J. van Houten, I. van Houten-Groeneveld, T. Gehrels	·	2.0 km	MPC · JPL
225276 Leïtos	1436 T-2	Leïtos	September 29, 1973	Palomar	C. J. van Houten, I. van Houten-Groeneveld, T. Gehrels	L4	10 km	MPC · JPL
225277 Stino	1960 SN	Stino	September 24, 1960	Palomar	L. D. Schmadel, Stoss, R. M.	·	2.7 km	MPC · JPL
225278	1981 DW_{1}	—	February 28, 1981	Siding Spring	S. J. Bus	·	2.3 km	MPC · JPL
225279	1991 VY_{10}	—	November 5, 1991	Kitt Peak	Spacewatch	·	2.7 km	MPC · JPL
225280	1993 FL_{17}	—	March 17, 1993	La Silla	UESAC	ERI	2.0 km	MPC · JPL
225281	1993 FL_{35}	—	March 19, 1993	La Silla	UESAC	·	1.4 km	MPC · JPL
225282	1993 RS_{7}	—	September 15, 1993	La Silla	E. W. Elst	·	2.6 km	MPC · JPL
225283	1994 GB_{5}	—	April 6, 1994	Kitt Peak	Spacewatch	·	3.0 km	MPC · JPL
225284	1994 JK_{6}	—	May 4, 1994	Kitt Peak	Spacewatch	EUN	1.5 km	MPC · JPL
225285	1994 JT_{6}	—	May 4, 1994	Kitt Peak	Spacewatch	·	2.1 km	MPC · JPL
225286	1994 PD_{5}	—	August 10, 1994	La Silla	E. W. Elst	·	1.7 km	MPC · JPL
225287	1994 RJ_{8}	—	September 12, 1994	Kitt Peak	Spacewatch	·	1.1 km	MPC · JPL
225288	1994 RT_{17}	—	September 3, 1994	La Silla	E. W. Elst	·	4.0 km	MPC · JPL
225289	1994 SK_{10}	—	September 28, 1994	Kitt Peak	Spacewatch	MAS	1.1 km	MPC · JPL
225290	1994 WK_{4}	—	November 26, 1994	Kitt Peak	Spacewatch	·	1.4 km	MPC · JPL
225291	1995 DV_{6}	—	February 24, 1995	Kitt Peak	Spacewatch	·	1.3 km	MPC · JPL
225292	1995 DS_{7}	—	February 24, 1995	Kitt Peak	Spacewatch	·	2.5 km	MPC · JPL
225293	1995 FF_{7}	—	March 24, 1995	Kitt Peak	Spacewatch	·	1.8 km	MPC · JPL
225294	1995 QA_{6}	—	August 22, 1995	Kitt Peak	Spacewatch	L4	11 km	MPC · JPL
225295	1995 SH_{13}	—	September 18, 1995	Kitt Peak	Spacewatch	AEO	2.0 km	MPC · JPL
225296	1995 SQ_{67}	—	September 18, 1995	Kitt Peak	Spacewatch	L4	10 km	MPC · JPL
225297	1995 UB_{2}	—	October 21, 1995	Kitt Peak	Spacewatch	PHO	1.3 km	MPC · JPL
225298	1995 UM_{16}	—	October 17, 1995	Kitt Peak	Spacewatch	HOF	3.7 km	MPC · JPL
225299	1995 UV_{17}	—	October 18, 1995	Kitt Peak	Spacewatch	·	2.5 km	MPC · JPL
225300	1995 UX_{76}	—	October 22, 1995	Kitt Peak	Spacewatch	·	1.1 km	MPC · JPL

== 225301–225400 ==
back to top

Designation			Discovery			Properties		Ref
Permanent	Provisional	Named after	Date	Site	Discoverer(s)	Category	Diam.	Ref
225301	1995 VG_{9}	—	November 14, 1995	Kitt Peak	Spacewatch	·	2.7 km	MPC · JPL
225302	1995 VU_{9}	—	November 15, 1995	Kitt Peak	Spacewatch	DOR	2.5 km	MPC · JPL
225303	1995 VZ_{13}	—	November 15, 1995	Kitt Peak	Spacewatch	·	1.1 km	MPC · JPL
225304	1995 WH_{8}	—	November 19, 1995	Haleakala	AMOS	V	940 m	MPC · JPL
225305	1995 XX_{3}	—	December 14, 1995	Kitt Peak	Spacewatch	·	890 m	MPC · JPL
225306	1996 EZ_{9}	—	March 12, 1996	Kitt Peak	Spacewatch	·	3.0 km	MPC · JPL
225307	1996 GV_{6}	—	April 12, 1996	Kitt Peak	Spacewatch	EOS	2.8 km	MPC · JPL
225308	1996 HH	—	April 17, 1996	Haleakala	AMOS	NYS	1.6 km	MPC · JPL
225309	1996 HV_{14}	—	April 17, 1996	La Silla	E. W. Elst	·	5.7 km	MPC · JPL
225310	1996 TG_{67}	—	October 7, 1996	Kitt Peak	Spacewatch	·	2.0 km	MPC · JPL
225311	1996 VP_{17}	—	November 6, 1996	Kitt Peak	Spacewatch	·	2.3 km	MPC · JPL
225312	1996 XB_{27}	—	December 12, 1996	Kitt Peak	Spacewatch	AMO · fast	150 m	MPC · JPL
225313	1997 CD_{13}	—	February 4, 1997	Kitt Peak	Spacewatch	·	1.6 km	MPC · JPL
225314	1997 EZ_{30}	—	March 5, 1997	Kitt Peak	Spacewatch	·	830 m	MPC · JPL
225315	1997 LS_{1}	—	June 2, 1997	Kitt Peak	Spacewatch	·	2.7 km	MPC · JPL
225316	1997 LQ_{16}	—	June 8, 1997	La Silla	E. W. Elst	·	1.9 km	MPC · JPL
225317	1997 SK_{18}	—	September 28, 1997	Kitt Peak	Spacewatch	·	1.5 km	MPC · JPL
225318	1997 SU_{32}	—	September 28, 1997	Kitt Peak	Spacewatch	L4	10 km	MPC · JPL
225319	1997 TV_{19}	—	October 2, 1997	Kitt Peak	Spacewatch	L4	8.1 km	MPC · JPL
225320	1997 WC_{11}	—	November 22, 1997	Kitt Peak	Spacewatch	EOS	3.0 km	MPC · JPL
225321 Stevenkoenig	1997 XP_{7}	Stevenkoenig	December 6, 1997	Caussols	ODAS	PHO	3.7 km	MPC · JPL
225322	1998 BQ_{19}	—	January 22, 1998	Kitt Peak	Spacewatch	·	2.1 km	MPC · JPL
225323	1998 FY_{9}	—	March 24, 1998	Caussols	ODAS	·	2.7 km	MPC · JPL
225324	1998 FO_{105}	—	March 31, 1998	Socorro	LINEAR	·	1.9 km	MPC · JPL
225325	1998 HP_{73}	—	April 21, 1998	Socorro	LINEAR	·	1.8 km	MPC · JPL
225326	1998 HD_{154}	—	April 29, 1998	Haleakala	NEAT	·	2.9 km	MPC · JPL
225327	1998 KN_{58}	—	May 23, 1998	Socorro	LINEAR	·	3.6 km	MPC · JPL
225328	1998 MJ_{6}	—	June 19, 1998	Kitt Peak	Spacewatch	·	1.0 km	MPC · JPL
225329	1998 QK_{40}	—	August 17, 1998	Socorro	LINEAR	·	1.2 km	MPC · JPL
225330	1998 QZ_{58}	—	August 26, 1998	Kitt Peak	Spacewatch	ERI	2.6 km	MPC · JPL
225331	1998 QK_{88}	—	August 24, 1998	Socorro	LINEAR	·	1.1 km	MPC · JPL
225332	1998 QA_{95}	—	August 19, 1998	Socorro	LINEAR	(2076)	1.2 km	MPC · JPL
225333	1998 QB_{105}	—	August 30, 1998	Siding Spring	R. H. McNaught	·	2.1 km	MPC · JPL
225334	1998 RX_{45}	—	September 14, 1998	Socorro	LINEAR	V	840 m	MPC · JPL
225335	1998 RB_{46}	—	September 14, 1998	Socorro	LINEAR	·	1.4 km	MPC · JPL
225336	1998 RB_{51}	—	September 14, 1998	Socorro	LINEAR	EOS	2.7 km	MPC · JPL
225337	1998 RZ_{69}	—	September 14, 1998	Socorro	LINEAR	·	1.7 km	MPC · JPL
225338	1998 SA_{6}	—	September 20, 1998	Kitt Peak	Spacewatch	·	3.7 km	MPC · JPL
225339	1998 SB_{12}	—	September 22, 1998	Caussols	ODAS	·	3.7 km	MPC · JPL
225340	1998 SQ_{29}	—	September 18, 1998	Kitt Peak	Spacewatch	·	1.2 km	MPC · JPL
225341	1998 SJ_{42}	—	September 27, 1998	Kitt Peak	Spacewatch	·	920 m	MPC · JPL
225342	1998 SN_{78}	—	September 26, 1998	Socorro	LINEAR	V	1.1 km	MPC · JPL
225343	1998 SY_{86}	—	September 26, 1998	Socorro	LINEAR	EOS	3.1 km	MPC · JPL
225344	1998 SK_{87}	—	September 26, 1998	Socorro	LINEAR	·	1.4 km	MPC · JPL
225345	1998 SD_{107}	—	September 26, 1998	Socorro	LINEAR	NYS	1.2 km	MPC · JPL
225346	1998 SQ_{149}	—	September 26, 1998	Socorro	LINEAR	·	5.2 km	MPC · JPL
225347	1998 SG_{161}	—	September 26, 1998	Socorro	LINEAR	·	1.0 km	MPC · JPL
225348	1998 SY_{176}	—	September 24, 1998	Anderson Mesa	LONEOS	·	3.4 km	MPC · JPL
225349	1998 TS_{8}	—	October 12, 1998	Kitt Peak	Spacewatch	·	1.9 km	MPC · JPL
225350	1998 TO_{9}	—	October 12, 1998	Kitt Peak	Spacewatch	·	4.4 km	MPC · JPL
225351	1998 TA_{20}	—	October 13, 1998	Kitt Peak	Spacewatch	EOS	3.0 km	MPC · JPL
225352	1998 US_{2}	—	October 20, 1998	Caussols	ODAS	·	2.7 km	MPC · JPL
225353	1998 UF_{11}	—	October 17, 1998	Kitt Peak	Spacewatch	·	4.3 km	MPC · JPL
225354	1998 UF_{49}	—	October 18, 1998	Anderson Mesa	LONEOS	·	2.8 km	MPC · JPL
225355	1998 UJ_{49}	—	October 18, 1998	Anderson Mesa	LONEOS	·	3.6 km	MPC · JPL
225356	1998 VX_{40}	—	November 14, 1998	Kitt Peak	Spacewatch	·	1.6 km	MPC · JPL
225357	1998 VD_{41}	—	November 14, 1998	Kitt Peak	Spacewatch	·	1.4 km	MPC · JPL
225358	1998 VV_{42}	—	November 15, 1998	Kitt Peak	Spacewatch	·	1.5 km	MPC · JPL
225359	1998 WJ_{24}	—	November 18, 1998	Kitt Peak	M. W. Buie	L4	9.8 km	MPC · JPL
225360	1998 WF_{30}	—	November 24, 1998	Kitt Peak	Spacewatch	MAS	810 m	MPC · JPL
225361	1998 XD_{2}	—	December 7, 1998	Caussols	ODAS	·	1.5 km	MPC · JPL
225362	1998 XU_{22}	—	December 11, 1998	Kitt Peak	Spacewatch	·	2.7 km	MPC · JPL
225363	1998 XV_{24}	—	December 12, 1998	Kitt Peak	Spacewatch	VER	5.2 km	MPC · JPL
225364	1999 BO_{30}	—	January 19, 1999	Kitt Peak	Spacewatch	·	2.1 km	MPC · JPL
225365	1999 CM_{79}	—	February 12, 1999	Socorro	LINEAR	·	3.6 km	MPC · JPL
225366	1999 CC_{97}	—	February 10, 1999	Socorro	LINEAR	·	5.9 km	MPC · JPL
225367	1999 CQ_{132}	—	February 8, 1999	Kitt Peak	Spacewatch	MAS	880 m	MPC · JPL
225368	1999 CD_{136}	—	February 9, 1999	Kitt Peak	Spacewatch	·	1.7 km	MPC · JPL
225369	1999 FE_{3}	—	March 17, 1999	Kitt Peak	Spacewatch	·	4.3 km	MPC · JPL
225370	1999 FF_{17}	—	March 23, 1999	Kitt Peak	Spacewatch	·	1.2 km	MPC · JPL
225371	1999 HM_{4}	—	April 16, 1999	Kitt Peak	Spacewatch	CLO	3.2 km	MPC · JPL
225372	1999 JC_{53}	—	May 10, 1999	Socorro	LINEAR	ADE	4.0 km	MPC · JPL
225373	1999 LJ_{15}	—	June 12, 1999	Socorro	LINEAR	PHO	1.3 km	MPC · JPL
225374	1999 RX_{10}	—	September 7, 1999	Socorro	LINEAR	·	2.8 km	MPC · JPL
225375	1999 RM_{106}	—	September 8, 1999	Socorro	LINEAR	BRA	2.1 km	MPC · JPL
225376	1999 RR_{164}	—	September 9, 1999	Socorro	LINEAR	·	1.1 km	MPC · JPL
225377	1999 RW_{216}	—	September 5, 1999	Kitt Peak	Spacewatch	AGN	1.8 km	MPC · JPL
225378	1999 SJ_{13}	—	September 16, 1999	Socorro	LINEAR	·	1.1 km	MPC · JPL
225379	1999 TC_{62}	—	October 7, 1999	Kitt Peak	Spacewatch	·	2.6 km	MPC · JPL
225380	1999 TP_{64}	—	October 8, 1999	Kitt Peak	Spacewatch	·	2.1 km	MPC · JPL
225381	1999 TL_{90}	—	October 2, 1999	Socorro	LINEAR	·	760 m	MPC · JPL
225382	1999 TK_{110}	—	October 4, 1999	Socorro	LINEAR	·	3.9 km	MPC · JPL
225383	1999 TW_{161}	—	October 9, 1999	Socorro	LINEAR	KOR	2.1 km	MPC · JPL
225384	1999 TO_{163}	—	October 9, 1999	Socorro	LINEAR	·	730 m	MPC · JPL
225385	1999 TO_{178}	—	October 10, 1999	Socorro	LINEAR	·	3.3 km	MPC · JPL
225386	1999 TA_{195}	—	October 12, 1999	Socorro	LINEAR	·	950 m	MPC · JPL
225387	1999 UJ_{18}	—	October 30, 1999	Kitt Peak	Spacewatch	KOR	2.3 km	MPC · JPL
225388	1999 UN_{18}	—	October 30, 1999	Kitt Peak	Spacewatch	·	1.4 km	MPC · JPL
225389	1999 UK_{21}	—	October 31, 1999	Kitt Peak	Spacewatch	·	850 m	MPC · JPL
225390	1999 UW_{28}	—	October 31, 1999	Kitt Peak	Spacewatch	AGN	1.6 km	MPC · JPL
225391	1999 UK_{29}	—	October 31, 1999	Kitt Peak	Spacewatch	·	2.5 km	MPC · JPL
225392	1999 UJ_{33}	—	October 31, 1999	Kitt Peak	Spacewatch	KOR	1.6 km	MPC · JPL
225393	1999 UU_{36}	—	October 16, 1999	Kitt Peak	Spacewatch	·	4.6 km	MPC · JPL
225394	1999 UP_{37}	—	October 16, 1999	Kitt Peak	Spacewatch	KOR	1.7 km	MPC · JPL
225395	1999 UO_{48}	—	October 30, 1999	Catalina	CSS	·	4.8 km	MPC · JPL
225396	1999 UY_{50}	—	October 30, 1999	Kitt Peak	Spacewatch	·	740 m	MPC · JPL
225397	1999 VA_{49}	—	November 3, 1999	Socorro	LINEAR	·	4.2 km	MPC · JPL
225398	1999 VQ_{115}	—	November 4, 1999	Kitt Peak	Spacewatch	·	960 m	MPC · JPL
225399	1999 VE_{121}	—	November 4, 1999	Kitt Peak	Spacewatch	·	2.6 km	MPC · JPL
225400	1999 VB_{124}	—	November 5, 1999	Kitt Peak	Spacewatch	·	2.7 km	MPC · JPL

== 225401–225500 ==
back to top

Designation			Discovery			Properties		Ref
Permanent	Provisional	Named after	Date	Site	Discoverer(s)	Category	Diam.	Ref
225401	1999 VL_{124}	—	November 6, 1999	Kitt Peak	Spacewatch	·	2.2 km	MPC · JPL
225402	1999 VZ_{126}	—	November 9, 1999	Kitt Peak	Spacewatch	·	2.3 km	MPC · JPL
225403	1999 VH_{132}	—	November 9, 1999	Kitt Peak	Spacewatch	·	2.6 km	MPC · JPL
225404	1999 VD_{170}	—	November 14, 1999	Socorro	LINEAR	·	1.4 km	MPC · JPL
225405	1999 VV_{195}	—	November 3, 1999	Catalina	CSS	·	1.2 km	MPC · JPL
225406	1999 VR_{211}	—	November 12, 1999	Socorro	LINEAR	·	970 m	MPC · JPL
225407	1999 WD_{20}	—	November 29, 1999	Kitt Peak	Spacewatch	·	2.5 km	MPC · JPL
225408	1999 XH_{5}	—	December 4, 1999	Catalina	CSS	·	1.5 km	MPC · JPL
225409	1999 XL_{25}	—	December 6, 1999	Socorro	LINEAR	·	3.4 km	MPC · JPL
225410	1999 XA_{76}	—	December 7, 1999	Socorro	LINEAR	·	1.4 km	MPC · JPL
225411	1999 XD_{162}	—	December 13, 1999	Socorro	LINEAR	·	1.1 km	MPC · JPL
225412	1999 XR_{227}	—	December 15, 1999	Kitt Peak	Spacewatch	·	1.0 km	MPC · JPL
225413	1999 XC_{238}	—	December 5, 1999	Kitt Peak	Spacewatch	·	940 m	MPC · JPL
225414	1999 XV_{244}	—	December 4, 1999	Kitt Peak	Spacewatch	·	1.0 km	MPC · JPL
225415	1999 XA_{261}	—	December 8, 1999	Socorro	LINEAR	·	1 km	MPC · JPL
225416	1999 YC	—	December 17, 1999	Socorro	LINEAR	APO +1km	1.7 km	MPC · JPL
225417	1999 YJ_{10}	—	December 27, 1999	Kitt Peak	Spacewatch	(883)	1.1 km	MPC · JPL
225418	2000 AY_{54}	—	January 4, 2000	Socorro	LINEAR	·	1.4 km	MPC · JPL
225419	2000 AW_{70}	—	January 5, 2000	Socorro	LINEAR	·	4.3 km	MPC · JPL
225420	2000 AU_{82}	—	January 5, 2000	Socorro	LINEAR	·	5.7 km	MPC · JPL
225421	2000 AR_{159}	—	January 3, 2000	Socorro	LINEAR	·	1.2 km	MPC · JPL
225422	2000 AB_{178}	—	January 7, 2000	Socorro	LINEAR	EOS	3.6 km	MPC · JPL
225423	2000 AO_{206}	—	January 3, 2000	Kitt Peak	Spacewatch	·	2.5 km	MPC · JPL
225424	2000 AB_{209}	—	January 4, 2000	Kitt Peak	Spacewatch	·	4.9 km	MPC · JPL
225425	2000 AK_{216}	—	January 8, 2000	Kitt Peak	Spacewatch	·	790 m	MPC · JPL
225426	2000 AF_{253}	—	January 7, 2000	Kitt Peak	Spacewatch	·	2.5 km	MPC · JPL
225427	2000 BF_{1}	—	January 28, 2000	Prescott	P. G. Comba	·	1.0 km	MPC · JPL
225428	2000 BX_{19}	—	January 26, 2000	Kitt Peak	Spacewatch	·	2.4 km	MPC · JPL
225429	2000 BJ_{35}	—	January 30, 2000	Socorro	LINEAR	·	4.0 km	MPC · JPL
225430	2000 CG	—	February 1, 2000	Prescott	P. G. Comba	·	3.1 km	MPC · JPL
225431	2000 CR_{9}	—	February 2, 2000	Socorro	LINEAR	·	1.3 km	MPC · JPL
225432	2000 CJ_{35}	—	February 2, 2000	Socorro	LINEAR	·	5.6 km	MPC · JPL
225433	2000 CX_{43}	—	February 2, 2000	Socorro	LINEAR	·	4.7 km	MPC · JPL
225434	2000 CD_{59}	—	February 6, 2000	Needville	Needville	·	950 m	MPC · JPL
225435	2000 CL_{69}	—	February 1, 2000	Kitt Peak	Spacewatch	·	3.4 km	MPC · JPL
225436	2000 CK_{79}	—	February 8, 2000	Kitt Peak	Spacewatch	·	2.6 km	MPC · JPL
225437	2000 CK_{84}	—	February 4, 2000	Socorro	LINEAR	·	4.5 km	MPC · JPL
225438 Jacobfirer	2000 CC_{110}	Jacobfirer	February 5, 2000	Kitt Peak	M. W. Buie	THM	3.3 km	MPC · JPL
225439	2000 CZ_{136}	—	February 4, 2000	Kitt Peak	Spacewatch	·	4.0 km	MPC · JPL
225440	2000 DU_{5}	—	February 25, 2000	Socorro	LINEAR	PHO	1.2 km	MPC · JPL
225441	2000 DJ_{6}	—	February 28, 2000	Socorro	LINEAR	·	1.2 km	MPC · JPL
225442	2000 DF_{16}	—	February 28, 2000	Višnjan	K. Korlević	·	1.7 km	MPC · JPL
225443	2000 DO_{26}	—	February 29, 2000	Socorro	LINEAR	·	3.0 km	MPC · JPL
225444	2000 DN_{35}	—	February 29, 2000	Socorro	LINEAR	·	3.7 km	MPC · JPL
225445	2000 DO_{36}	—	February 29, 2000	Socorro	LINEAR	·	1.2 km	MPC · JPL
225446	2000 DA_{61}	—	February 29, 2000	Socorro	LINEAR	THM	3.0 km	MPC · JPL
225447	2000 DX_{61}	—	February 29, 2000	Socorro	LINEAR	·	1.7 km	MPC · JPL
225448	2000 DR_{67}	—	February 29, 2000	Socorro	LINEAR	·	4.8 km	MPC · JPL
225449	2000 DN_{77}	—	February 29, 2000	Socorro	LINEAR	THM	5.3 km	MPC · JPL
225450	2000 DY_{86}	—	February 29, 2000	Socorro	LINEAR	ERI	3.0 km	MPC · JPL
225451	2000 ER_{4}	—	March 2, 2000	Kitt Peak	Spacewatch	THM	3.5 km	MPC · JPL
225452	2000 EO_{10}	—	March 3, 2000	Socorro	LINEAR	·	2.4 km	MPC · JPL
225453	2000 ED_{13}	—	March 4, 2000	Socorro	LINEAR	·	3.0 km	MPC · JPL
225454	2000 EY_{14}	—	March 4, 2000	Socorro	LINEAR	PHO	1.7 km	MPC · JPL
225455	2000 EQ_{15}	—	March 3, 2000	Kitt Peak	Spacewatch	NYS	1.6 km	MPC · JPL
225456	2000 EK_{23}	—	March 4, 2000	Kitt Peak	Spacewatch	THM	4.2 km	MPC · JPL
225457	2000 EG_{27}	—	March 3, 2000	Socorro	LINEAR	·	3.6 km	MPC · JPL
225458	2000 EW_{35}	—	March 3, 2000	Socorro	LINEAR	·	3.9 km	MPC · JPL
225459	2000 ER_{44}	—	March 9, 2000	Socorro	LINEAR	·	2.4 km	MPC · JPL
225460	2000 EG_{53}	—	March 4, 2000	Kitt Peak	Spacewatch	·	3.1 km	MPC · JPL
225461	2000 EL_{53}	—	March 8, 2000	Kitt Peak	Spacewatch	·	1.9 km	MPC · JPL
225462	2000 EV_{55}	—	March 5, 2000	Socorro	LINEAR	·	3.4 km	MPC · JPL
225463	2000 EQ_{67}	—	March 10, 2000	Socorro	LINEAR	MAS	1.0 km	MPC · JPL
225464	2000 EV_{75}	—	March 5, 2000	Socorro	LINEAR	·	5.2 km	MPC · JPL
225465	2000 EU_{144}	—	March 3, 2000	Catalina	CSS	·	1.5 km	MPC · JPL
225466	2000 EN_{168}	—	March 4, 2000	Socorro	LINEAR	·	5.5 km	MPC · JPL
225467	2000 ET_{173}	—	March 4, 2000	Socorro	LINEAR	TIR	3.7 km	MPC · JPL
225468	2000 ET_{177}	—	March 3, 2000	Kitt Peak	Spacewatch	NYS ·	2.1 km	MPC · JPL
225469	2000 FT_{3}	—	March 28, 2000	Socorro	LINEAR	·	6.6 km	MPC · JPL
225470	2000 FA_{21}	—	March 29, 2000	Socorro	LINEAR	·	2.0 km	MPC · JPL
225471	2000 FG_{24}	—	March 29, 2000	Socorro	LINEAR	·	3.4 km	MPC · JPL
225472	2000 FS_{36}	—	March 29, 2000	Socorro	LINEAR	MAS	1.1 km	MPC · JPL
225473	2000 FK_{47}	—	March 29, 2000	Socorro	LINEAR	·	2.0 km	MPC · JPL
225474	2000 FE_{59}	—	March 29, 2000	Socorro	LINEAR	·	2.9 km	MPC · JPL
225475	2000 GQ_{48}	—	April 5, 2000	Socorro	LINEAR	MAS	940 m	MPC · JPL
225476	2000 GD_{55}	—	April 5, 2000	Socorro	LINEAR	NYS	1.9 km	MPC · JPL
225477	2000 GO_{61}	—	April 5, 2000	Socorro	LINEAR	·	1.7 km	MPC · JPL
225478	2000 GV_{81}	—	April 7, 2000	Socorro	LINEAR	PHO	3.5 km	MPC · JPL
225479	2000 GX_{89}	—	April 4, 2000	Socorro	LINEAR	ERI	2.4 km	MPC · JPL
225480	2000 GS_{112}	—	April 4, 2000	Socorro	LINEAR	·	1.6 km	MPC · JPL
225481	2000 GV_{120}	—	April 5, 2000	Kitt Peak	Spacewatch	·	1.8 km	MPC · JPL
225482	2000 GS_{136}	—	April 12, 2000	Socorro	LINEAR	·	3.4 km	MPC · JPL
225483	2000 GT_{145}	—	April 11, 2000	Kitt Peak	Spacewatch	·	1.6 km	MPC · JPL
225484	2000 GY_{154}	—	April 6, 2000	Anderson Mesa	LONEOS	·	1.5 km	MPC · JPL
225485	2000 GT_{160}	—	April 7, 2000	Socorro	LINEAR	NYS	1.7 km	MPC · JPL
225486	2000 HQ_{2}	—	April 25, 2000	Kitt Peak	Spacewatch	·	2.9 km	MPC · JPL
225487	2000 HV_{6}	—	April 24, 2000	Kitt Peak	Spacewatch	MAS	1.0 km	MPC · JPL
225488	2000 HT_{15}	—	April 28, 2000	Socorro	LINEAR	·	670 m	MPC · JPL
225489	2000 HD_{26}	—	April 24, 2000	Anderson Mesa	LONEOS	H	700 m	MPC · JPL
225490	2000 HF_{31}	—	April 29, 2000	Socorro	LINEAR	·	4.2 km	MPC · JPL
225491	2000 HV_{40}	—	April 28, 2000	Socorro	LINEAR	·	3.5 km	MPC · JPL
225492	2000 HT_{49}	—	April 29, 2000	Socorro	LINEAR	NYS	1.6 km	MPC · JPL
225493	2000 HP_{63}	—	April 26, 2000	Anderson Mesa	LONEOS	·	1.6 km	MPC · JPL
225494	2000 HX_{81}	—	April 29, 2000	Socorro	LINEAR	MAS	990 m	MPC · JPL
225495	2000 HT_{105}	—	April 25, 2000	Kitt Peak	Spacewatch	V	1.0 km	MPC · JPL
225496	2000 KX_{2}	—	May 27, 2000	Socorro	LINEAR	PHO	2.0 km	MPC · JPL
225497	2000 KC_{40}	—	May 25, 2000	Kitt Peak	Spacewatch	·	2.6 km	MPC · JPL
225498	2000 KR_{73}	—	May 27, 2000	Socorro	LINEAR	·	3.6 km	MPC · JPL
225499	2000 LU_{23}	—	June 7, 2000	Socorro	LINEAR	H	830 m	MPC · JPL
225500	2000 LK_{32}	—	June 5, 2000	Kitt Peak	Spacewatch	·	2.5 km	MPC · JPL

== 225501–225600 ==
back to top

Designation			Discovery			Properties		Ref
Permanent	Provisional	Named after	Date	Site	Discoverer(s)	Category	Diam.	Ref
225501	2000 NB_{19}	—	July 5, 2000	Anderson Mesa	LONEOS	·	1.9 km	MPC · JPL
225502	2000 OY_{33}	—	July 30, 2000	Socorro	LINEAR	RAF	1.4 km	MPC · JPL
225503	2000 PY_{21}	—	August 1, 2000	Socorro	LINEAR	·	2.2 km	MPC · JPL
225504	2000 QR_{15}	—	August 24, 2000	Socorro	LINEAR	·	2.0 km	MPC · JPL
225505	2000 QT_{26}	—	August 24, 2000	Socorro	LINEAR	(5)	2.2 km	MPC · JPL
225506	2000 QJ_{58}	—	August 26, 2000	Socorro	LINEAR	·	4.1 km	MPC · JPL
225507	2000 QG_{71}	—	August 24, 2000	Socorro	LINEAR	·	1.8 km	MPC · JPL
225508	2000 QY_{84}	—	August 25, 2000	Socorro	LINEAR	·	3.1 km	MPC · JPL
225509	2000 QY_{98}	—	August 28, 2000	Socorro	LINEAR	EUN	2.1 km	MPC · JPL
225510	2000 QS_{107}	—	August 29, 2000	Socorro	LINEAR	·	1.8 km	MPC · JPL
225511	2000 QH_{109}	—	August 29, 2000	Socorro	LINEAR	·	3.4 km	MPC · JPL
225512	2000 QS_{128}	—	August 25, 2000	Socorro	LINEAR	·	2.8 km	MPC · JPL
225513	2000 QA_{131}	—	August 24, 2000	Socorro	LINEAR	ADE	3.9 km	MPC · JPL
225514	2000 QG_{138}	—	August 31, 2000	Socorro	LINEAR	·	2.4 km	MPC · JPL
225515	2000 QD_{156}	—	August 31, 2000	Socorro	LINEAR	·	1.7 km	MPC · JPL
225516	2000 QE_{163}	—	August 31, 2000	Socorro	LINEAR	·	2.2 km	MPC · JPL
225517	2000 QX_{170}	—	August 31, 2000	Socorro	LINEAR	·	1.7 km	MPC · JPL
225518	2000 QJ_{179}	—	August 31, 2000	Socorro	LINEAR	·	2.1 km	MPC · JPL
225519	2000 QR_{211}	—	August 31, 2000	Socorro	LINEAR	(5)	1.6 km	MPC · JPL
225520	2000 QD_{221}	—	August 21, 2000	Anderson Mesa	LONEOS	·	3.0 km	MPC · JPL
225521	2000 QP_{223}	—	August 21, 2000	Anderson Mesa	LONEOS	·	1.9 km	MPC · JPL
225522	2000 RR_{15}	—	September 1, 2000	Socorro	LINEAR	·	2.9 km	MPC · JPL
225523	2000 RN_{16}	—	September 1, 2000	Socorro	LINEAR	·	2.4 km	MPC · JPL
225524	2000 RA_{26}	—	September 1, 2000	Socorro	LINEAR	·	1.7 km	MPC · JPL
225525	2000 RB_{27}	—	September 1, 2000	Socorro	LINEAR	·	2.4 km	MPC · JPL
225526	2000 RH_{76}	—	September 4, 2000	Socorro	LINEAR	·	2.0 km	MPC · JPL
225527	2000 RE_{82}	—	September 1, 2000	Socorro	LINEAR	·	2.9 km	MPC · JPL
225528	2000 RY_{89}	—	September 3, 2000	Socorro	LINEAR	·	1.8 km	MPC · JPL
225529	2000 RG_{96}	—	September 4, 2000	Haleakala	NEAT	·	2.6 km	MPC · JPL
225530	2000 RH_{97}	—	September 5, 2000	Anderson Mesa	LONEOS	·	5.0 km	MPC · JPL
225531	2000 SF_{1}	—	September 18, 2000	Socorro	LINEAR	BAR	1.8 km	MPC · JPL
225532	2000 SP_{5}	—	September 22, 2000	Socorro	LINEAR	·	2.9 km	MPC · JPL
225533	2000 SL_{20}	—	September 23, 2000	Socorro	LINEAR	EUN	2.1 km	MPC · JPL
225534	2000 SX_{25}	—	September 23, 2000	Socorro	LINEAR	slow	2.6 km	MPC · JPL
225535	2000 SN_{63}	—	September 24, 2000	Socorro	LINEAR	·	2.8 km	MPC · JPL
225536	2000 SO_{63}	—	September 24, 2000	Socorro	LINEAR	·	2.2 km	MPC · JPL
225537	2000 SZ_{64}	—	September 24, 2000	Socorro	LINEAR	·	2.3 km	MPC · JPL
225538	2000 SV_{65}	—	September 24, 2000	Socorro	LINEAR	ADE	2.8 km	MPC · JPL
225539	2000 SJ_{90}	—	September 22, 2000	Socorro	LINEAR	·	2.5 km	MPC · JPL
225540	2000 SA_{98}	—	September 23, 2000	Socorro	LINEAR	(5)	1.7 km	MPC · JPL
225541	2000 SV_{105}	—	September 24, 2000	Socorro	LINEAR	(5)	1.8 km	MPC · JPL
225542	2000 SW_{124}	—	September 24, 2000	Socorro	LINEAR	EUN	1.9 km	MPC · JPL
225543	2000 SO_{134}	—	September 23, 2000	Socorro	LINEAR	·	2.3 km	MPC · JPL
225544	2000 SV_{142}	—	September 23, 2000	Socorro	LINEAR	·	2.4 km	MPC · JPL
225545	2000 SO_{163}	—	September 30, 2000	Ondřejov	P. Pravec, P. Kušnirák	EUN	1.8 km	MPC · JPL
225546	2000 SH_{173}	—	September 28, 2000	Socorro	LINEAR	EUN	2.0 km	MPC · JPL
225547	2000 SN_{189}	—	September 22, 2000	Kitt Peak	Spacewatch	·	2.4 km	MPC · JPL
225548	2000 SR_{194}	—	September 24, 2000	Socorro	LINEAR	·	2.7 km	MPC · JPL
225549	2000 SC_{199}	—	September 24, 2000	Socorro	LINEAR	MIS	3.0 km	MPC · JPL
225550	2000 SC_{285}	—	September 23, 2000	Socorro	LINEAR	·	2.1 km	MPC · JPL
225551	2000 SG_{285}	—	September 23, 2000	Socorro	LINEAR	GEF	1.7 km	MPC · JPL
225552	2000 SK_{286}	—	September 25, 2000	Socorro	LINEAR	DOR	2.9 km	MPC · JPL
225553	2000 SQ_{302}	—	September 28, 2000	Socorro	LINEAR	·	3.9 km	MPC · JPL
225554	2000 SP_{304}	—	September 30, 2000	Socorro	LINEAR	EUN	2.3 km	MPC · JPL
225555	2000 SJ_{316}	—	September 30, 2000	Socorro	LINEAR	·	1.8 km	MPC · JPL
225556	2000 SV_{317}	—	September 30, 2000	Socorro	LINEAR	·	2.8 km	MPC · JPL
225557	2000 SD_{334}	—	September 26, 2000	Haleakala	NEAT	·	3.4 km	MPC · JPL
225558	2000 SM_{347}	—	September 25, 2000	Haleakala	NEAT	·	2.9 km	MPC · JPL
225559	2000 SR_{364}	—	September 20, 2000	Socorro	LINEAR	EUN	1.8 km	MPC · JPL
225560	2000 SF_{365}	—	September 21, 2000	Anderson Mesa	LONEOS	·	2.7 km	MPC · JPL
225561	2000 SB_{372}	—	September 25, 2000	Anderson Mesa	LONEOS	slow	2.4 km	MPC · JPL
225562	2000 TJ	—	October 2, 2000	Anza	M. Collins, Rudd, A.	ADE	3.1 km	MPC · JPL
225563	2000 TL_{2}	—	October 2, 2000	Eskridge	G. Hug	·	2.3 km	MPC · JPL
225564	2000 TY_{8}	—	October 1, 2000	Socorro	LINEAR	WIT	1.4 km	MPC · JPL
225565	2000 TR_{12}	—	October 1, 2000	Socorro	LINEAR	·	2.4 km	MPC · JPL
225566	2000 TP_{15}	—	October 1, 2000	Socorro	LINEAR	·	2.7 km	MPC · JPL
225567	2000 TD_{45}	—	October 1, 2000	Socorro	LINEAR	·	2.6 km	MPC · JPL
225568	2000 TV_{51}	—	October 1, 2000	Socorro	LINEAR	JUN	2.1 km	MPC · JPL
225569	2000 TZ_{59}	—	October 2, 2000	Anderson Mesa	LONEOS	JUN	1.5 km	MPC · JPL
225570	2000 TL_{63}	—	October 3, 2000	Socorro	LINEAR	·	3.2 km	MPC · JPL
225571	2000 UV_{1}	—	October 23, 2000	Kleť	Kleť	·	2.7 km	MPC · JPL
225572	2000 UW_{27}	—	October 25, 2000	Socorro	LINEAR	·	2.2 km	MPC · JPL
225573	2000 UV_{58}	—	October 25, 2000	Socorro	LINEAR	·	2.8 km	MPC · JPL
225574	2000 UQ_{64}	—	October 25, 2000	Socorro	LINEAR	·	3.2 km	MPC · JPL
225575	2000 UM_{68}	—	October 25, 2000	Socorro	LINEAR	·	3.3 km	MPC · JPL
225576	2000 UR_{78}	—	October 24, 2000	Socorro	LINEAR	·	2.5 km	MPC · JPL
225577	2000 UM_{99}	—	October 25, 2000	Socorro	LINEAR	·	2.6 km	MPC · JPL
225578	2000 UG_{101}	—	October 25, 2000	Socorro	LINEAR	·	2.3 km	MPC · JPL
225579	2000 UP_{102}	—	October 25, 2000	Socorro	LINEAR	·	2.9 km	MPC · JPL
225580	2000 VH_{4}	—	November 1, 2000	Socorro	LINEAR	·	2.4 km	MPC · JPL
225581	2000 VB_{53}	—	November 3, 2000	Socorro	LINEAR	·	2.1 km	MPC · JPL
225582	2000 VC_{58}	—	November 3, 2000	Socorro	LINEAR	·	3.0 km	MPC · JPL
225583	2000 WS_{32}	—	November 20, 2000	Socorro	LINEAR	·	2.3 km	MPC · JPL
225584	2000 WU_{39}	—	November 20, 2000	Socorro	LINEAR	·	2.7 km	MPC · JPL
225585	2000 WT_{47}	—	November 21, 2000	Socorro	LINEAR	·	3.2 km	MPC · JPL
225586	2000 WS_{67}	—	November 27, 2000	Socorro	LINEAR	APO	720 m	MPC · JPL
225587	2000 WS_{77}	—	November 20, 2000	Socorro	LINEAR	·	1.9 km	MPC · JPL
225588	2000 WS_{81}	—	November 20, 2000	Socorro	LINEAR	AGN	1.5 km	MPC · JPL
225589	2000 WM_{90}	—	November 21, 2000	Socorro	LINEAR	·	3.7 km	MPC · JPL
225590	2000 WE_{94}	—	November 21, 2000	Socorro	LINEAR	DOR	4.5 km	MPC · JPL
225591	2000 WL_{103}	—	November 26, 2000	Socorro	LINEAR	·	3.5 km	MPC · JPL
225592	2000 WR_{117}	—	November 20, 2000	Socorro	LINEAR	(40134)	5.0 km	MPC · JPL
225593	2000 WA_{134}	—	November 19, 2000	Socorro	LINEAR	·	2.7 km	MPC · JPL
225594	2000 WX_{136}	—	November 20, 2000	Socorro	LINEAR	·	3.7 km	MPC · JPL
225595	2000 WT_{155}	—	November 30, 2000	Socorro	LINEAR	·	3.7 km	MPC · JPL
225596	2000 XK_{4}	—	December 1, 2000	Socorro	LINEAR	·	3.4 km	MPC · JPL
225597	2000 XQ_{13}	—	December 1, 2000	Socorro	LINEAR	·	4.7 km	MPC · JPL
225598	2000 XN_{21}	—	December 4, 2000	Socorro	LINEAR	·	3.0 km	MPC · JPL
225599	2000 XE_{31}	—	December 4, 2000	Socorro	LINEAR	·	2.8 km	MPC · JPL
225600	2000 YJ_{2}	—	December 19, 2000	Kitt Peak	Spacewatch	·	3.0 km	MPC · JPL

== 225601–225700 ==
back to top

Designation			Discovery			Properties		Ref
Permanent	Provisional	Named after	Date	Site	Discoverer(s)	Category	Diam.	Ref
225601	2000 YY_{29}	—	December 29, 2000	Bisei SG Center	BATTeRS	·	3.0 km	MPC · JPL
225602	2000 YS_{38}	—	December 30, 2000	Socorro	LINEAR	·	2.8 km	MPC · JPL
225603	2000 YT_{39}	—	December 30, 2000	Socorro	LINEAR	·	3.5 km	MPC · JPL
225604	2000 YO_{41}	—	December 30, 2000	Socorro	LINEAR	·	3.6 km	MPC · JPL
225605	2000 YK_{42}	—	December 30, 2000	Socorro	LINEAR	GEF	2.1 km	MPC · JPL
225606	2000 YM_{43}	—	December 30, 2000	Socorro	LINEAR	·	2.2 km	MPC · JPL
225607	2000 YS_{49}	—	December 30, 2000	Socorro	LINEAR	(18466)	3.2 km	MPC · JPL
225608	2000 YB_{60}	—	December 30, 2000	Socorro	LINEAR	·	3.8 km	MPC · JPL
225609	2000 YN_{60}	—	December 30, 2000	Socorro	LINEAR	·	3.9 km	MPC · JPL
225610	2000 YJ_{74}	—	December 30, 2000	Socorro	LINEAR	·	3.6 km	MPC · JPL
225611	2000 YY_{77}	—	December 30, 2000	Socorro	LINEAR	·	2.4 km	MPC · JPL
225612	2000 YK_{82}	—	December 30, 2000	Socorro	LINEAR	·	2.0 km	MPC · JPL
225613	2000 YH_{107}	—	December 30, 2000	Socorro	LINEAR	·	3.0 km	MPC · JPL
225614	2000 YA_{120}	—	December 19, 2000	Anderson Mesa	LONEOS	·	3.4 km	MPC · JPL
225615	2000 YR_{124}	—	December 29, 2000	Anderson Mesa	LONEOS	·	1.6 km	MPC · JPL
225616	2000 YB_{143}	—	December 19, 2000	Socorro	LINEAR	DOR	3.0 km	MPC · JPL
225617	2001 AQ_{14}	—	January 2, 2001	Socorro	LINEAR	·	3.6 km	MPC · JPL
225618	2001 AO_{26}	—	January 5, 2001	Socorro	LINEAR	·	8.6 km	MPC · JPL
225619	2001 AK_{32}	—	January 4, 2001	Socorro	LINEAR	·	4.3 km	MPC · JPL
225620	2001 AR_{34}	—	January 4, 2001	Socorro	LINEAR	·	2.3 km	MPC · JPL
225621	2001 BD	—	January 17, 2001	Oizumi	T. Kobayashi	·	3.5 km	MPC · JPL
225622	2001 BY_{3}	—	January 18, 2001	Socorro	LINEAR	526	4.1 km	MPC · JPL
225623	2001 BS_{16}	—	January 18, 2001	Socorro	LINEAR	L4	18 km	MPC · JPL
225624	2001 BJ_{39}	—	January 19, 2001	Kitt Peak	Spacewatch	L4	13 km	MPC · JPL
225625	2001 BK_{40}	—	January 21, 2001	Socorro	LINEAR	·	2.3 km	MPC · JPL
225626	2001 BQ_{52}	—	January 17, 2001	Kitt Peak	Spacewatch	KOR	2.1 km	MPC · JPL
225627	2001 BJ_{57}	—	January 20, 2001	Haleakala	NEAT	·	4.2 km	MPC · JPL
225628	2001 CS_{14}	—	February 1, 2001	Socorro	LINEAR	·	2.4 km	MPC · JPL
225629	2001 DN_{51}	—	February 16, 2001	Socorro	LINEAR	·	1.7 km	MPC · JPL
225630	2001 DR_{77}	—	February 21, 2001	Kitt Peak	Spacewatch	·	3.1 km	MPC · JPL
225631	2001 ER_{15}	—	March 15, 2001	Oizumi	T. Kobayashi	·	1.3 km	MPC · JPL
225632	2001 EX_{19}	—	March 15, 2001	Anderson Mesa	LONEOS	L4	15 km	MPC · JPL
225633	2001 FF_{15}	—	March 19, 2001	Anderson Mesa	LONEOS	·	5.5 km	MPC · JPL
225634	2001 FU_{49}	—	March 18, 2001	Socorro	LINEAR	·	980 m	MPC · JPL
225635	2001 FY_{54}	—	March 19, 2001	Socorro	LINEAR	·	5.1 km	MPC · JPL
225636	2001 FD_{59}	—	March 19, 2001	Socorro	LINEAR	·	5.5 km	MPC · JPL
225637	2001 FL_{60}	—	March 19, 2001	Socorro	LINEAR	·	3.8 km	MPC · JPL
225638	2001 FF_{72}	—	March 19, 2001	Socorro	LINEAR	·	3.0 km	MPC · JPL
225639	2001 FS_{78}	—	March 19, 2001	Socorro	LINEAR	·	1.1 km	MPC · JPL
225640	2001 FP_{84}	—	March 26, 2001	Kitt Peak	Spacewatch	KOR	2.1 km	MPC · JPL
225641	2001 FO_{89}	—	March 27, 2001	Kitt Peak	Spacewatch	·	820 m	MPC · JPL
225642	2001 FY_{89}	—	March 27, 2001	Kitt Peak	Spacewatch	CYB	4.4 km	MPC · JPL
225643	2001 FN_{96}	—	March 16, 2001	Socorro	LINEAR	·	2.3 km	MPC · JPL
225644	2001 FZ_{98}	—	March 16, 2001	Socorro	LINEAR	·	980 m	MPC · JPL
225645	2001 FW_{107}	—	March 18, 2001	Anderson Mesa	LONEOS	·	1.2 km	MPC · JPL
225646	2001 FN_{115}	—	March 19, 2001	Anderson Mesa	LONEOS	MAS	1.1 km	MPC · JPL
225647	2001 FU_{119}	—	March 27, 2001	Kitt Peak	Spacewatch	·	910 m	MPC · JPL
225648	2001 FA_{123}	—	March 23, 2001	Anderson Mesa	LONEOS	·	950 m	MPC · JPL
225649	2001 FF_{126}	—	March 29, 2001	Kitt Peak	Spacewatch	·	4.7 km	MPC · JPL
225650	2001 FA_{146}	—	March 24, 2001	Anderson Mesa	LONEOS	·	3.3 km	MPC · JPL
225651	2001 FK_{147}	—	March 24, 2001	Anderson Mesa	LONEOS	·	3.8 km	MPC · JPL
225652	2001 FD_{148}	—	March 24, 2001	Anderson Mesa	LONEOS	·	3.4 km	MPC · JPL
225653	2001 FC_{178}	—	March 19, 2001	Socorro	LINEAR	·	1.4 km	MPC · JPL
225654	2001 FR_{189}	—	March 18, 2001	Anderson Mesa	LONEOS	·	4.3 km	MPC · JPL
225655	2001 HR_{28}	—	April 27, 2001	Socorro	LINEAR	·	1.2 km	MPC · JPL
225656	2001 HW_{33}	—	April 27, 2001	Socorro	LINEAR	·	6.7 km	MPC · JPL
225657	2001 JX_{1}	—	May 15, 2001	Kitt Peak	Spacewatch	·	1.0 km	MPC · JPL
225658	2001 KX_{43}	—	May 22, 2001	Socorro	LINEAR	V	1.1 km	MPC · JPL
225659	2001 KH_{47}	—	May 24, 2001	Socorro	LINEAR	·	1.5 km	MPC · JPL
225660	2001 KB_{62}	—	May 18, 2001	Socorro	LINEAR	·	7.0 km	MPC · JPL
225661	2001 KH_{71}	—	May 24, 2001	Anderson Mesa	LONEOS	·	1.0 km	MPC · JPL
225662	2001 KG_{74}	—	May 26, 2001	Kitt Peak	Spacewatch	·	4.3 km	MPC · JPL
225663	2001 LH_{16}	—	June 13, 2001	Haleakala	NEAT	·	1.8 km	MPC · JPL
225664	2001 MJ_{7}	—	June 21, 2001	Socorro	LINEAR	·	2.2 km	MPC · JPL
225665	2001 NU_{8}	—	July 14, 2001	Palomar	NEAT	V	1.1 km	MPC · JPL
225666	2001 NE_{10}	—	July 14, 2001	Palomar	NEAT	·	1.4 km	MPC · JPL
225667	2001 ND_{15}	—	July 13, 2001	Palomar	NEAT	·	1.8 km	MPC · JPL
225668	2001 OU_{2}	—	July 17, 2001	Anderson Mesa	LONEOS	·	1.3 km	MPC · JPL
225669	2001 OE_{11}	—	July 20, 2001	Palomar	NEAT	·	1.9 km	MPC · JPL
225670	2001 OP_{11}	—	July 18, 2001	Palomar	NEAT	·	1.5 km	MPC · JPL
225671	2001 OY_{19}	—	July 21, 2001	Palomar	NEAT	·	3.1 km	MPC · JPL
225672	2001 OE_{20}	—	July 19, 2001	Anderson Mesa	LONEOS	·	2.2 km	MPC · JPL
225673	2001 OV_{76}	—	July 25, 2001	Haleakala	NEAT	V	1.0 km	MPC · JPL
225674	2001 OA_{96}	—	July 29, 2001	Bergisch Gladbach	W. Bickel	NYS	1.4 km	MPC · JPL
225675	2001 PA	—	August 1, 2001	Palomar	NEAT	·	2.5 km	MPC · JPL
225676	2001 PZ_{15}	—	August 9, 2001	Palomar	NEAT	·	1.5 km	MPC · JPL
225677	2001 PY_{21}	—	August 10, 2001	Haleakala	NEAT	·	1.6 km	MPC · JPL
225678	2001 PC_{43}	—	August 12, 2001	Haleakala	NEAT	·	2.0 km	MPC · JPL
225679	2001 PG_{50}	—	August 15, 2001	Haleakala	NEAT	·	1.3 km	MPC · JPL
225680	2001 PO_{60}	—	August 13, 2001	Haleakala	NEAT	·	1.2 km	MPC · JPL
225681	2001 PL_{61}	—	August 13, 2001	Haleakala	NEAT	·	1.3 km	MPC · JPL
225682	2001 PA_{66}	—	August 15, 2001	Haleakala	NEAT	NYS	1.3 km	MPC · JPL
225683	2001 QQ_{8}	—	August 16, 2001	Socorro	LINEAR	·	2.0 km	MPC · JPL
225684	2001 QC_{33}	—	August 17, 2001	Palomar	NEAT	·	1.8 km	MPC · JPL
225685	2001 QW_{41}	—	August 16, 2001	Socorro	LINEAR	·	1.5 km	MPC · JPL
225686	2001 QE_{60}	—	August 18, 2001	Socorro	LINEAR	·	1.4 km	MPC · JPL
225687	2001 QG_{68}	—	August 20, 2001	Terre Haute	Wolfe, C.	·	3.0 km	MPC · JPL
225688	2001 QQ_{88}	—	August 22, 2001	Kitt Peak	Spacewatch	·	1.4 km	MPC · JPL
225689	2001 QR_{116}	—	August 17, 2001	Socorro	LINEAR	PHO	3.5 km	MPC · JPL
225690	2001 QS_{119}	—	August 18, 2001	Socorro	LINEAR	·	2.6 km	MPC · JPL
225691	2001 QU_{124}	—	August 19, 2001	Socorro	LINEAR	·	1.5 km	MPC · JPL
225692	2001 QJ_{146}	—	August 25, 2001	Kitt Peak	Spacewatch	MAS	990 m	MPC · JPL
225693	2001 QS_{146}	—	August 26, 2001	Kitt Peak	Spacewatch	NYS	1.3 km	MPC · JPL
225694	2001 QP_{158}	—	August 23, 2001	Anderson Mesa	LONEOS	·	1.6 km	MPC · JPL
225695	2001 QX_{162}	—	August 23, 2001	Anderson Mesa	LONEOS	CLA	2.9 km	MPC · JPL
225696	2001 QU_{169}	—	August 22, 2001	Socorro	LINEAR	·	2.5 km	MPC · JPL
225697	2001 QB_{170}	—	August 23, 2001	Socorro	LINEAR	·	1.2 km	MPC · JPL
225698	2001 QM_{185}	—	August 21, 2001	Palomar	NEAT	H	800 m	MPC · JPL
225699	2001 QF_{186}	—	August 21, 2001	Palomar	NEAT	H	790 m	MPC · JPL
225700	2001 QH_{193}	—	August 22, 2001	Socorro	LINEAR	·	3.4 km	MPC · JPL

== 225701–225800 ==
back to top

Designation			Discovery			Properties		Ref
Permanent	Provisional	Named after	Date	Site	Discoverer(s)	Category	Diam.	Ref
225701	2001 QH_{203}	—	August 23, 2001	Anderson Mesa	LONEOS	·	1.8 km	MPC · JPL
225702	2001 QH_{215}	—	August 23, 2001	Anderson Mesa	LONEOS	·	1.8 km	MPC · JPL
225703	2001 QQ_{222}	—	August 24, 2001	Anderson Mesa	LONEOS	V	990 m	MPC · JPL
225704	2001 QY_{229}	—	August 24, 2001	Anderson Mesa	LONEOS	·	1.6 km	MPC · JPL
225705	2001 QJ_{231}	—	August 24, 2001	Anderson Mesa	LONEOS	V	880 m	MPC · JPL
225706	2001 QE_{242}	—	August 24, 2001	Socorro	LINEAR	·	1.8 km	MPC · JPL
225707	2001 QN_{242}	—	August 24, 2001	Socorro	LINEAR	·	1.7 km	MPC · JPL
225708	2001 QH_{246}	—	August 24, 2001	Socorro	LINEAR	NYS · fast	1.8 km	MPC · JPL
225709	2001 QA_{252}	—	August 25, 2001	Socorro	LINEAR	NYS	1.5 km	MPC · JPL
225710	2001 QX_{278}	—	August 19, 2001	Socorro	LINEAR	·	2.3 km	MPC · JPL
225711 Danyzy	2001 QT_{288}	Danyzy	August 17, 2001	Pises	Pises	MAS	840 m	MPC · JPL
225712	2001 RN_{1}	—	September 7, 2001	Socorro	LINEAR	·	1.4 km	MPC · JPL
225713	2001 RE_{9}	—	September 8, 2001	Socorro	LINEAR	H	1.1 km	MPC · JPL
225714	2001 RP_{20}	—	September 7, 2001	Socorro	LINEAR	NYS	1.7 km	MPC · JPL
225715	2001 RW_{21}	—	September 7, 2001	Socorro	LINEAR	NYS	1.6 km	MPC · JPL
225716	2001 RH_{23}	—	September 7, 2001	Socorro	LINEAR	·	1.4 km	MPC · JPL
225717	2001 RX_{32}	—	September 8, 2001	Socorro	LINEAR	·	1.9 km	MPC · JPL
225718	2001 RL_{56}	—	September 12, 2001	Socorro	LINEAR	·	1.8 km	MPC · JPL
225719	2001 RS_{58}	—	September 12, 2001	Socorro	LINEAR	NYS	1.7 km	MPC · JPL
225720	2001 RJ_{59}	—	September 12, 2001	Socorro	LINEAR	NYS	1.4 km	MPC · JPL
225721	2001 RJ_{85}	—	September 11, 2001	Anderson Mesa	LONEOS	·	2.0 km	MPC · JPL
225722	2001 RR_{86}	—	September 11, 2001	Anderson Mesa	LONEOS	NYS	1.9 km	MPC · JPL
225723	2001 RS_{92}	—	September 11, 2001	Anderson Mesa	LONEOS	·	1.7 km	MPC · JPL
225724	2001 RD_{97}	—	September 12, 2001	Kitt Peak	Spacewatch	·	1.4 km	MPC · JPL
225725	2001 RY_{99}	—	September 12, 2001	Socorro	LINEAR	NYS	1.7 km	MPC · JPL
225726	2001 RE_{100}	—	September 12, 2001	Socorro	LINEAR	·	2.2 km	MPC · JPL
225727	2001 RU_{106}	—	September 12, 2001	Socorro	LINEAR	MAS	950 m	MPC · JPL
225728	2001 RE_{107}	—	September 12, 2001	Socorro	LINEAR	·	2.1 km	MPC · JPL
225729	2001 RA_{109}	—	September 12, 2001	Socorro	LINEAR	NYS	1.5 km	MPC · JPL
225730	2001 RR_{110}	—	September 12, 2001	Socorro	LINEAR	NYS	1.9 km	MPC · JPL
225731	2001 RD_{113}	—	September 12, 2001	Socorro	LINEAR	MAS	880 m	MPC · JPL
225732	2001 RM_{130}	—	September 12, 2001	Socorro	LINEAR	MAS	1.1 km	MPC · JPL
225733	2001 RA_{131}	—	September 12, 2001	Socorro	LINEAR	·	1.3 km	MPC · JPL
225734	2001 RQ_{141}	—	September 12, 2001	Socorro	LINEAR	·	1.6 km	MPC · JPL
225735	2001 RA_{150}	—	September 11, 2001	Anderson Mesa	LONEOS	NYS	1.3 km	MPC · JPL
225736	2001 RB_{150}	—	September 11, 2001	Anderson Mesa	LONEOS	·	1.7 km	MPC · JPL
225737	2001 RS_{154}	—	September 11, 2001	Anderson Mesa	LONEOS	·	1.8 km	MPC · JPL
225738	2001 SL_{5}	—	September 16, 2001	Socorro	LINEAR	·	1.6 km	MPC · JPL
225739	2001 SO_{5}	—	September 16, 2001	Socorro	LINEAR	·	1.1 km	MPC · JPL
225740	2001 SK_{15}	—	September 16, 2001	Socorro	LINEAR	·	1.9 km	MPC · JPL
225741	2001 SP_{15}	—	September 16, 2001	Socorro	LINEAR	·	1.2 km	MPC · JPL
225742	2001 SO_{29}	—	September 16, 2001	Socorro	LINEAR	NYS	1.3 km	MPC · JPL
225743	2001 SM_{36}	—	September 16, 2001	Socorro	LINEAR	·	2.7 km	MPC · JPL
225744	2001 SF_{37}	—	September 16, 2001	Socorro	LINEAR	·	1.6 km	MPC · JPL
225745	2001 SY_{41}	—	September 16, 2001	Socorro	LINEAR	·	2.9 km	MPC · JPL
225746	2001 SC_{42}	—	September 16, 2001	Socorro	LINEAR	·	1.8 km	MPC · JPL
225747	2001 SF_{75}	—	September 19, 2001	Anderson Mesa	LONEOS	·	1.7 km	MPC · JPL
225748	2001 SG_{82}	—	September 20, 2001	Socorro	LINEAR	·	1.6 km	MPC · JPL
225749	2001 SQ_{100}	—	September 20, 2001	Socorro	LINEAR	·	2.0 km	MPC · JPL
225750	2001 SF_{130}	—	September 16, 2001	Socorro	LINEAR	·	5.5 km	MPC · JPL
225751	2001 SB_{148}	—	September 17, 2001	Socorro	LINEAR	·	2.2 km	MPC · JPL
225752	2001 ST_{152}	—	September 17, 2001	Socorro	LINEAR	·	1.6 km	MPC · JPL
225753	2001 SF_{156}	—	September 17, 2001	Socorro	LINEAR	·	2.2 km	MPC · JPL
225754	2001 SL_{159}	—	September 17, 2001	Socorro	LINEAR	·	2.1 km	MPC · JPL
225755	2001 SJ_{160}	—	September 17, 2001	Socorro	LINEAR	·	1.9 km	MPC · JPL
225756	2001 SW_{161}	—	September 17, 2001	Socorro	LINEAR	NYS	1.4 km	MPC · JPL
225757	2001 SV_{165}	—	September 19, 2001	Socorro	LINEAR	NYS	1.6 km	MPC · JPL
225758	2001 SE_{167}	—	September 19, 2001	Socorro	LINEAR	MAS	960 m	MPC · JPL
225759	2001 SB_{174}	—	September 16, 2001	Socorro	LINEAR	MAS	1.1 km	MPC · JPL
225760	2001 SK_{195}	—	September 19, 2001	Socorro	LINEAR	NYS	1.5 km	MPC · JPL
225761	2001 SH_{207}	—	September 19, 2001	Socorro	LINEAR	EUN	1.7 km	MPC · JPL
225762	2001 SJ_{229}	—	September 19, 2001	Socorro	LINEAR	·	1.5 km	MPC · JPL
225763	2001 SH_{231}	—	September 19, 2001	Socorro	LINEAR	PHO	1.7 km	MPC · JPL
225764	2001 SG_{235}	—	September 19, 2001	Socorro	LINEAR	·	1.7 km	MPC · JPL
225765	2001 SD_{255}	—	September 19, 2001	Socorro	LINEAR	T_{j} (2.98) · 3:2	5.9 km	MPC · JPL
225766	2001 ST_{259}	—	September 20, 2001	Socorro	LINEAR	NYS	1.4 km	MPC · JPL
225767	2001 SL_{283}	—	September 20, 2001	Kitt Peak	Spacewatch	MAS	940 m	MPC · JPL
225768	2001 SQ_{289}	—	September 25, 2001	Goodricke-Pigott	R. A. Tucker	·	2.8 km	MPC · JPL
225769	2001 SA_{299}	—	September 20, 2001	Socorro	LINEAR	·	2.2 km	MPC · JPL
225770	2001 SZ_{349}	—	September 19, 2001	Socorro	LINEAR	NYS	1.6 km	MPC · JPL
225771	2001 SR_{354}	—	September 18, 2001	Anderson Mesa	LONEOS	·	1.5 km	MPC · JPL
225772	2001 TL_{6}	—	October 10, 2001	Palomar	NEAT	·	2.0 km	MPC · JPL
225773	2001 TQ_{16}	—	October 11, 2001	Socorro	LINEAR	·	1.9 km	MPC · JPL
225774	2001 TB_{21}	—	October 9, 2001	Socorro	LINEAR	·	3.8 km	MPC · JPL
225775	2001 TY_{48}	—	October 15, 2001	Socorro	LINEAR	H	850 m	MPC · JPL
225776	2001 TG_{82}	—	October 14, 2001	Socorro	LINEAR	(5)	1.4 km	MPC · JPL
225777	2001 TH_{148}	—	October 10, 2001	Palomar	NEAT	·	1.7 km	MPC · JPL
225778	2001 TB_{151}	—	October 10, 2001	Palomar	NEAT	·	1.7 km	MPC · JPL
225779	2001 TW_{151}	—	October 10, 2001	Palomar	NEAT	·	2.0 km	MPC · JPL
225780	2001 TL_{154}	—	October 15, 2001	Palomar	NEAT	·	2.4 km	MPC · JPL
225781	2001 TT_{155}	—	October 14, 2001	Kitt Peak	Spacewatch	·	1.2 km	MPC · JPL
225782	2001 TW_{162}	—	October 11, 2001	Palomar	NEAT	NYS	1.5 km	MPC · JPL
225783	2001 TP_{180}	—	October 14, 2001	Socorro	LINEAR	·	2.1 km	MPC · JPL
225784	2001 TW_{183}	—	October 14, 2001	Socorro	LINEAR	·	2.1 km	MPC · JPL
225785	2001 TP_{200}	—	October 11, 2001	Socorro	LINEAR	·	1.6 km	MPC · JPL
225786	2001 UP_{8}	—	October 17, 2001	Socorro	LINEAR	·	1.7 km	MPC · JPL
225787	2001 UV_{43}	—	October 17, 2001	Socorro	LINEAR	·	1.7 km	MPC · JPL
225788	2001 UF_{44}	—	October 17, 2001	Socorro	LINEAR	NYS	1.6 km	MPC · JPL
225789	2001 UJ_{107}	—	October 20, 2001	Socorro	LINEAR	·	2.2 km	MPC · JPL
225790	2001 UY_{111}	—	October 21, 2001	Socorro	LINEAR	·	2.2 km	MPC · JPL
225791	2001 UV_{138}	—	October 23, 2001	Socorro	LINEAR	·	1.2 km	MPC · JPL
225792	2001 UQ_{187}	—	October 17, 2001	Palomar	NEAT	·	1.6 km	MPC · JPL
225793	2001 UQ_{222}	—	October 21, 2001	Kitt Peak	Spacewatch	·	1.2 km	MPC · JPL
225794	2001 VO_{8}	—	November 9, 2001	Socorro	LINEAR	·	1.2 km	MPC · JPL
225795	2001 VZ_{26}	—	November 9, 2001	Socorro	LINEAR	·	1.5 km	MPC · JPL
225796	2001 VY_{30}	—	November 9, 2001	Socorro	LINEAR	PHO	4.9 km	MPC · JPL
225797	2001 VM_{33}	—	November 9, 2001	Socorro	LINEAR	·	2.1 km	MPC · JPL
225798	2001 VS_{33}	—	November 9, 2001	Socorro	LINEAR	·	2.2 km	MPC · JPL
225799	2001 VN_{41}	—	November 9, 2001	Socorro	LINEAR	·	1.4 km	MPC · JPL
225800	2001 VR_{41}	—	November 9, 2001	Socorro	LINEAR	3:2	4.0 km	MPC · JPL

== 225801–225900 ==
back to top

Designation			Discovery			Properties		Ref
Permanent	Provisional	Named after	Date	Site	Discoverer(s)	Category	Diam.	Ref
225801	2001 VN_{50}	—	November 10, 2001	Socorro	LINEAR	(5)	1 km	MPC · JPL
225802	2001 VC_{71}	—	November 11, 2001	Socorro	LINEAR	·	1.5 km	MPC · JPL
225803	2001 VS_{77}	—	November 11, 2001	Kitt Peak	Spacewatch	·	3.8 km	MPC · JPL
225804	2001 VK_{78}	—	November 10, 2001	Socorro	LINEAR	PHO	2.2 km	MPC · JPL
225805	2001 VN_{78}	—	November 15, 2001	Socorro	LINEAR	H	840 m	MPC · JPL
225806	2001 VC_{82}	—	November 9, 2001	Bergisch Gladbach	W. Bickel	·	2.2 km	MPC · JPL
225807	2001 VS_{87}	—	November 11, 2001	Socorro	LINEAR	H	920 m	MPC · JPL
225808	2001 VQ_{98}	—	November 15, 2001	Socorro	LINEAR	·	2.1 km	MPC · JPL
225809	2001 VX_{104}	—	November 12, 2001	Socorro	LINEAR	·	1.6 km	MPC · JPL
225810	2001 VG_{106}	—	November 12, 2001	Socorro	LINEAR	(5)	1.6 km	MPC · JPL
225811	2001 VF_{113}	—	November 12, 2001	Socorro	LINEAR	·	1.7 km	MPC · JPL
225812	2001 VF_{115}	—	November 12, 2001	Socorro	LINEAR	·	1.7 km	MPC · JPL
225813	2001 VS_{120}	—	November 12, 2001	Socorro	LINEAR	H	1 km	MPC · JPL
225814	2001 WD_{1}	—	November 17, 2001	Socorro	LINEAR	H	850 m	MPC · JPL
225815	2001 WP_{8}	—	November 17, 2001	Socorro	LINEAR	·	2.6 km	MPC · JPL
225816	2001 WZ_{9}	—	November 17, 2001	Socorro	LINEAR	·	1.6 km	MPC · JPL
225817	2001 WJ_{32}	—	November 17, 2001	Socorro	LINEAR	·	1.1 km	MPC · JPL
225818	2001 WV_{56}	—	November 19, 2001	Socorro	LINEAR	·	1.7 km	MPC · JPL
225819	2001 WW_{81}	—	November 20, 2001	Socorro	LINEAR	·	1.4 km	MPC · JPL
225820	2001 WZ_{87}	—	November 19, 2001	Socorro	LINEAR	KRM	3.6 km	MPC · JPL
225821	2001 WO_{103}	—	November 18, 2001	Socorro	LINEAR	·	3.8 km	MPC · JPL
225822	2001 XL	—	December 4, 2001	Socorro	LINEAR	·	2.6 km	MPC · JPL
225823	2001 XR_{4}	—	December 9, 2001	Socorro	LINEAR	BAR	3.4 km	MPC · JPL
225824	2001 XT_{6}	—	December 9, 2001	Socorro	LINEAR	H	1.0 km	MPC · JPL
225825	2001 XQ_{26}	—	December 10, 2001	Socorro	LINEAR	(5)	2.1 km	MPC · JPL
225826	2001 XV_{26}	—	December 10, 2001	Socorro	LINEAR	·	2.1 km	MPC · JPL
225827	2001 XB_{38}	—	December 9, 2001	Socorro	LINEAR	EUN	1.8 km	MPC · JPL
225828	2001 XE_{44}	—	December 9, 2001	Socorro	LINEAR	·	2.0 km	MPC · JPL
225829	2001 XA_{46}	—	December 9, 2001	Socorro	LINEAR	ADE	2.9 km	MPC · JPL
225830	2001 XA_{57}	—	December 10, 2001	Socorro	LINEAR	NYS	2.1 km	MPC · JPL
225831	2001 XN_{64}	—	December 10, 2001	Socorro	LINEAR	(5)	1.7 km	MPC · JPL
225832	2001 XF_{66}	—	December 10, 2001	Socorro	LINEAR	·	3.8 km	MPC · JPL
225833	2001 XR_{68}	—	December 11, 2001	Socorro	LINEAR	H	760 m	MPC · JPL
225834	2001 XE_{79}	—	December 11, 2001	Socorro	LINEAR	·	1.6 km	MPC · JPL
225835	2001 XT_{80}	—	December 11, 2001	Socorro	LINEAR	·	2.6 km	MPC · JPL
225836	2001 XE_{87}	—	December 13, 2001	Socorro	LINEAR	EUN	2.0 km	MPC · JPL
225837	2001 XZ_{91}	—	December 10, 2001	Socorro	LINEAR	·	1.1 km	MPC · JPL
225838	2001 XM_{94}	—	December 10, 2001	Socorro	LINEAR	·	2.2 km	MPC · JPL
225839	2001 XQ_{97}	—	December 10, 2001	Socorro	LINEAR	·	2.0 km	MPC · JPL
225840	2001 XC_{103}	—	December 14, 2001	Socorro	LINEAR	H	890 m	MPC · JPL
225841	2001 XB_{109}	—	December 10, 2001	Socorro	LINEAR	·	3.5 km	MPC · JPL
225842	2001 XQ_{117}	—	December 13, 2001	Socorro	LINEAR	·	2.4 km	MPC · JPL
225843	2001 XS_{123}	—	December 14, 2001	Socorro	LINEAR	·	1.2 km	MPC · JPL
225844	2001 XP_{131}	—	December 14, 2001	Socorro	LINEAR	·	1.7 km	MPC · JPL
225845	2001 XW_{133}	—	December 14, 2001	Socorro	LINEAR	·	1.6 km	MPC · JPL
225846	2001 XS_{135}	—	December 14, 2001	Socorro	LINEAR	EUN	2.1 km	MPC · JPL
225847	2001 XE_{136}	—	December 14, 2001	Socorro	LINEAR	·	1.1 km	MPC · JPL
225848	2001 XO_{146}	—	December 14, 2001	Socorro	LINEAR	·	2.1 km	MPC · JPL
225849	2001 XS_{159}	—	December 14, 2001	Socorro	LINEAR	·	4.4 km	MPC · JPL
225850	2001 XX_{159}	—	December 14, 2001	Socorro	LINEAR	·	2.2 km	MPC · JPL
225851	2001 XR_{161}	—	December 14, 2001	Socorro	LINEAR	·	2.4 km	MPC · JPL
225852	2001 XK_{166}	—	December 14, 2001	Socorro	LINEAR	·	3.6 km	MPC · JPL
225853	2001 XX_{171}	—	December 14, 2001	Socorro	LINEAR	·	1.3 km	MPC · JPL
225854	2001 XB_{172}	—	December 14, 2001	Socorro	LINEAR	·	1.8 km	MPC · JPL
225855	2001 XZ_{172}	—	December 14, 2001	Socorro	LINEAR	·	1.7 km	MPC · JPL
225856	2001 XN_{175}	—	December 14, 2001	Socorro	LINEAR	(5)	2.0 km	MPC · JPL
225857	2001 XA_{177}	—	December 14, 2001	Socorro	LINEAR	·	2.1 km	MPC · JPL
225858	2001 XK_{177}	—	December 14, 2001	Socorro	LINEAR	·	2.2 km	MPC · JPL
225859	2001 XC_{182}	—	December 14, 2001	Socorro	LINEAR	(5)	2.5 km	MPC · JPL
225860	2001 XT_{188}	—	December 14, 2001	Socorro	LINEAR	·	1.6 km	MPC · JPL
225861	2001 XS_{191}	—	December 14, 2001	Socorro	LINEAR	·	2.4 km	MPC · JPL
225862	2001 XR_{201}	—	December 11, 2001	Kitt Peak	Spacewatch	·	1.8 km	MPC · JPL
225863	2001 XF_{205}	—	December 11, 2001	Socorro	LINEAR	·	1.7 km	MPC · JPL
225864	2001 XX_{205}	—	December 11, 2001	Socorro	LINEAR	·	1.3 km	MPC · JPL
225865	2001 XS_{215}	—	December 14, 2001	Socorro	LINEAR	·	1.8 km	MPC · JPL
225866	2001 XM_{223}	—	December 15, 2001	Socorro	LINEAR	EUN	1.5 km	MPC · JPL
225867	2001 XM_{226}	—	December 15, 2001	Socorro	LINEAR	·	1.8 km	MPC · JPL
225868	2001 XE_{229}	—	December 15, 2001	Socorro	LINEAR	3:2	6.3 km	MPC · JPL
225869	2001 XA_{234}	—	December 15, 2001	Socorro	LINEAR	(194)	2.0 km	MPC · JPL
225870	2001 XU_{239}	—	December 15, 2001	Socorro	LINEAR	·	2.2 km	MPC · JPL
225871	2001 XC_{246}	—	December 15, 2001	Socorro	LINEAR	·	1.5 km	MPC · JPL
225872	2001 XG_{260}	—	December 10, 2001	Kitt Peak	Spacewatch	MAS · fast	970 m	MPC · JPL
225873	2001 YL_{4}	—	December 22, 2001	Pla D'Arguines	D'Arguines, Pla	·	3.6 km	MPC · JPL
225874	2001 YS_{4}	—	December 23, 2001	Kingsnake	J. V. McClusky	MAR	2.0 km	MPC · JPL
225875	2001 YS_{25}	—	December 18, 2001	Socorro	LINEAR	·	1.6 km	MPC · JPL
225876	2001 YM_{27}	—	December 18, 2001	Socorro	LINEAR	·	1.6 km	MPC · JPL
225877	2001 YG_{52}	—	December 18, 2001	Socorro	LINEAR	·	2.7 km	MPC · JPL
225878	2001 YB_{62}	—	December 18, 2001	Socorro	LINEAR	·	1.6 km	MPC · JPL
225879	2001 YS_{65}	—	December 18, 2001	Socorro	LINEAR	3:2 · SHU	7.0 km	MPC · JPL
225880	2001 YM_{67}	—	December 18, 2001	Socorro	LINEAR	·	1.8 km	MPC · JPL
225881	2001 YW_{68}	—	December 18, 2001	Socorro	LINEAR	·	1.6 km	MPC · JPL
225882	2001 YS_{70}	—	December 18, 2001	Socorro	LINEAR	·	2.3 km	MPC · JPL
225883	2001 YH_{71}	—	December 18, 2001	Socorro	LINEAR	·	2.0 km	MPC · JPL
225884	2001 YN_{81}	—	December 18, 2001	Socorro	LINEAR	H	890 m	MPC · JPL
225885	2001 YY_{88}	—	December 18, 2001	Socorro	LINEAR	·	3.0 km	MPC · JPL
225886	2001 YQ_{89}	—	December 18, 2001	Socorro	LINEAR	(5)	2.2 km	MPC · JPL
225887	2001 YP_{108}	—	December 18, 2001	Socorro	LINEAR	·	2.4 km	MPC · JPL
225888	2001 YD_{111}	—	December 18, 2001	Anderson Mesa	LONEOS	·	3.0 km	MPC · JPL
225889	2001 YK_{115}	—	December 17, 2001	Socorro	LINEAR	·	2.4 km	MPC · JPL
225890	2001 YY_{115}	—	December 17, 2001	Socorro	LINEAR	·	3.0 km	MPC · JPL
225891	2001 YC_{116}	—	December 17, 2001	Socorro	LINEAR	·	3.3 km	MPC · JPL
225892	2001 YM_{123}	—	December 17, 2001	Socorro	LINEAR	·	2.9 km	MPC · JPL
225893	2001 YE_{127}	—	December 17, 2001	Socorro	LINEAR	(5)	2.0 km	MPC · JPL
225894	2001 YV_{145}	—	December 18, 2001	Socorro	LINEAR	·	3.6 km	MPC · JPL
225895	2001 YJ_{153}	—	December 19, 2001	Anderson Mesa	LONEOS	EUN	1.9 km	MPC · JPL
225896	2001 YG_{154}	—	December 19, 2001	Palomar	NEAT	MAR	2.2 km	MPC · JPL
225897	2001 YH_{155}	—	December 20, 2001	Palomar	NEAT	·	4.3 km	MPC · JPL
225898	2002 AA_{1}	—	January 6, 2002	Goodricke-Pigott	R. A. Tucker	·	3.5 km	MPC · JPL
225899	2002 AS_{2}	—	January 6, 2002	Socorro	LINEAR	·	2.3 km	MPC · JPL
225900	2002 AF_{3}	—	January 7, 2002	Socorro	LINEAR	APO +1km	910 m	MPC · JPL

== 225901–226000 ==
back to top

Designation			Discovery			Properties		Ref
Permanent	Provisional	Named after	Date	Site	Discoverer(s)	Category	Diam.	Ref
225901	2002 AR_{16}	—	January 4, 2002	Haleakala	NEAT	·	2.2 km	MPC · JPL
225902	2002 AF_{22}	—	January 9, 2002	Socorro	LINEAR	·	2.2 km	MPC · JPL
225903	2002 AH_{24}	—	January 8, 2002	Palomar	NEAT	·	3.9 km	MPC · JPL
225904	2002 AN_{25}	—	January 8, 2002	Palomar	NEAT	·	1.6 km	MPC · JPL
225905	2002 AW_{29}	—	January 8, 2002	Socorro	LINEAR	·	3.2 km	MPC · JPL
225906	2002 AO_{36}	—	January 9, 2002	Socorro	LINEAR	·	1.7 km	MPC · JPL
225907	2002 AX_{39}	—	January 9, 2002	Socorro	LINEAR	(5)	2.0 km	MPC · JPL
225908	2002 AC_{47}	—	January 9, 2002	Socorro	LINEAR	·	1.8 km	MPC · JPL
225909	2002 AM_{51}	—	January 9, 2002	Socorro	LINEAR	·	2.4 km	MPC · JPL
225910	2002 AS_{55}	—	January 9, 2002	Socorro	LINEAR	·	1.8 km	MPC · JPL
225911	2002 AA_{56}	—	January 9, 2002	Socorro	LINEAR	·	3.0 km	MPC · JPL
225912	2002 AW_{63}	—	January 11, 2002	Socorro	LINEAR	·	3.3 km	MPC · JPL
225913	2002 AM_{73}	—	January 8, 2002	Socorro	LINEAR	·	1.7 km	MPC · JPL
225914	2002 AR_{80}	—	January 8, 2002	Socorro	LINEAR	·	2.0 km	MPC · JPL
225915	2002 AA_{85}	—	January 9, 2002	Socorro	LINEAR	·	2.2 km	MPC · JPL
225916	2002 AX_{86}	—	January 9, 2002	Socorro	LINEAR	(5)	1.7 km	MPC · JPL
225917	2002 AR_{88}	—	January 9, 2002	Socorro	LINEAR	·	1.7 km	MPC · JPL
225918	2002 AZ_{96}	—	January 8, 2002	Socorro	LINEAR	·	1.6 km	MPC · JPL
225919	2002 AL_{102}	—	January 8, 2002	Socorro	LINEAR	·	1.8 km	MPC · JPL
225920	2002 AE_{105}	—	January 9, 2002	Socorro	LINEAR	·	1.6 km	MPC · JPL
225921	2002 AE_{106}	—	January 9, 2002	Socorro	LINEAR	(5)	1.6 km	MPC · JPL
225922	2002 AH_{107}	—	January 9, 2002	Socorro	LINEAR	·	1.5 km	MPC · JPL
225923	2002 AK_{109}	—	January 9, 2002	Socorro	LINEAR	·	1.9 km	MPC · JPL
225924	2002 AE_{116}	—	January 9, 2002	Socorro	LINEAR	·	2.5 km	MPC · JPL
225925	2002 AG_{131}	—	January 12, 2002	Palomar	NEAT	·	5.8 km	MPC · JPL
225926	2002 AL_{137}	—	January 9, 2002	Socorro	LINEAR	·	3.7 km	MPC · JPL
225927	2002 AU_{138}	—	January 9, 2002	Socorro	LINEAR	·	1.8 km	MPC · JPL
225928	2002 AM_{140}	—	January 13, 2002	Socorro	LINEAR	·	2.0 km	MPC · JPL
225929	2002 AQ_{144}	—	January 13, 2002	Socorro	LINEAR	·	1.9 km	MPC · JPL
225930	2002 AL_{161}	—	January 13, 2002	Socorro	LINEAR	slow	1.8 km	MPC · JPL
225931	2002 AS_{170}	—	January 14, 2002	Socorro	LINEAR	·	1.6 km	MPC · JPL
225932	2002 AT_{170}	—	January 14, 2002	Socorro	LINEAR	·	1.5 km	MPC · JPL
225933	2002 AJ_{171}	—	January 14, 2002	Socorro	LINEAR	·	2.7 km	MPC · JPL
225934	2002 AT_{175}	—	January 14, 2002	Socorro	LINEAR	(5)	1.6 km	MPC · JPL
225935	2002 AV_{175}	—	January 14, 2002	Socorro	LINEAR	·	1.8 km	MPC · JPL
225936	2002 AT_{176}	—	January 14, 2002	Socorro	LINEAR	·	2.5 km	MPC · JPL
225937	2002 AA_{180}	—	January 6, 2002	Socorro	LINEAR	H	960 m	MPC · JPL
225938	2002 AV_{184}	—	January 8, 2002	Palomar	NEAT	·	2.1 km	MPC · JPL
225939	2002 AH_{185}	—	January 8, 2002	Socorro	LINEAR	NEM	2.7 km	MPC · JPL
225940	2002 AE_{187}	—	January 8, 2002	Socorro	LINEAR	HNS	1.8 km	MPC · JPL
225941	2002 AQ_{198}	—	January 11, 2002	Anderson Mesa	LONEOS	·	3.4 km	MPC · JPL
225942	2002 AK_{202}	—	January 13, 2002	Socorro	LINEAR	·	2.0 km	MPC · JPL
225943	2002 AM_{203}	—	January 8, 2002	Kitt Peak	Spacewatch	·	1.8 km	MPC · JPL
225944	2002 BX_{3}	—	January 18, 2002	Anderson Mesa	LONEOS	·	2.6 km	MPC · JPL
225945	2002 BE_{21}	—	January 25, 2002	Socorro	LINEAR	BAR	1.5 km	MPC · JPL
225946	2002 BT_{23}	—	January 23, 2002	Socorro	LINEAR	·	2.9 km	MPC · JPL
225947	2002 BN_{27}	—	January 20, 2002	Anderson Mesa	LONEOS	·	3.2 km	MPC · JPL
225948	2002 BJ_{29}	—	January 20, 2002	Anderson Mesa	LONEOS	·	2.3 km	MPC · JPL
225949	2002 BT_{29}	—	January 21, 2002	Anderson Mesa	LONEOS	·	3.9 km	MPC · JPL
225950	2002 CC_{2}	—	February 3, 2002	Palomar	NEAT	·	2.0 km	MPC · JPL
225951	2002 CF_{5}	—	February 4, 2002	Palomar	NEAT	·	2.3 km	MPC · JPL
225952	2002 CO_{5}	—	February 4, 2002	Haleakala	NEAT	·	2.1 km	MPC · JPL
225953	2002 CK_{24}	—	February 6, 2002	Haleakala	NEAT	·	2.6 km	MPC · JPL
225954	2002 CD_{27}	—	February 6, 2002	Socorro	LINEAR	(5)	1.6 km	MPC · JPL
225955	2002 CK_{27}	—	February 6, 2002	Socorro	LINEAR	(5)	1.5 km	MPC · JPL
225956	2002 CG_{31}	—	February 6, 2002	Socorro	LINEAR	·	3.6 km	MPC · JPL
225957	2002 CT_{33}	—	February 6, 2002	Socorro	LINEAR	·	1.7 km	MPC · JPL
225958	2002 CL_{60}	—	February 6, 2002	Socorro	LINEAR	·	3.4 km	MPC · JPL
225959	2002 CM_{62}	—	February 6, 2002	Socorro	LINEAR	·	2.0 km	MPC · JPL
225960	2002 CY_{64}	—	February 6, 2002	Socorro	LINEAR	·	1.8 km	MPC · JPL
225961	2002 CC_{71}	—	February 7, 2002	Socorro	LINEAR	·	2.0 km	MPC · JPL
225962	2002 CN_{87}	—	February 7, 2002	Socorro	LINEAR	·	2.1 km	MPC · JPL
225963	2002 CQ_{89}	—	February 7, 2002	Socorro	LINEAR	·	2.8 km	MPC · JPL
225964	2002 CG_{96}	—	February 7, 2002	Socorro	LINEAR	NEM	3.3 km	MPC · JPL
225965	2002 CM_{100}	—	February 7, 2002	Socorro	LINEAR	·	2.5 km	MPC · JPL
225966	2002 CK_{104}	—	February 7, 2002	Socorro	LINEAR	·	1.8 km	MPC · JPL
225967	2002 CS_{113}	—	February 8, 2002	Socorro	LINEAR	·	2.1 km	MPC · JPL
225968	2002 CF_{116}	—	February 12, 2002	Desert Eagle	W. K. Y. Yeung	·	2.6 km	MPC · JPL
225969	2002 CJ_{116}	—	February 11, 2002	Bohyunsan	Bohyunsan	HOF	3.7 km	MPC · JPL
225970	2002 CD_{121}	—	February 7, 2002	Socorro	LINEAR	(5)	1.7 km	MPC · JPL
225971	2002 CL_{135}	—	February 8, 2002	Socorro	LINEAR	WIT	1.4 km	MPC · JPL
225972	2002 CB_{141}	—	February 8, 2002	Socorro	LINEAR	·	1.7 km	MPC · JPL
225973	2002 CR_{142}	—	February 9, 2002	Socorro	LINEAR	·	1.9 km	MPC · JPL
225974	2002 CG_{160}	—	February 8, 2002	Socorro	LINEAR	(5)	3.0 km	MPC · JPL
225975	2002 CW_{160}	—	February 8, 2002	Socorro	LINEAR	·	3.8 km	MPC · JPL
225976	2002 CU_{164}	—	February 8, 2002	Socorro	LINEAR	·	2.2 km	MPC · JPL
225977	2002 CP_{180}	—	February 10, 2002	Socorro	LINEAR	·	4.2 km	MPC · JPL
225978	2002 CF_{186}	—	February 10, 2002	Socorro	LINEAR	·	2.8 km	MPC · JPL
225979	2002 CP_{189}	—	February 10, 2002	Socorro	LINEAR	·	1.8 km	MPC · JPL
225980	2002 CL_{196}	—	February 10, 2002	Socorro	LINEAR	·	3.1 km	MPC · JPL
225981	2002 CQ_{215}	—	February 10, 2002	Socorro	LINEAR	·	2.8 km	MPC · JPL
225982	2002 CR_{222}	—	February 11, 2002	Socorro	LINEAR	MRX	1.4 km	MPC · JPL
225983	2002 CH_{225}	—	February 15, 2002	Bergisch Gladbach	W. Bickel	WIT	1.5 km	MPC · JPL
225984	2002 CJ_{228}	—	February 6, 2002	Palomar	NEAT	L4	18 km	MPC · JPL
225985	2002 CP_{235}	—	February 8, 2002	Socorro	LINEAR	·	3.9 km	MPC · JPL
225986	2002 CY_{237}	—	February 11, 2002	Socorro	LINEAR	·	4.3 km	MPC · JPL
225987	2002 CT_{251}	—	February 3, 2002	Anderson Mesa	LONEOS	EUN	2.8 km	MPC · JPL
225988	2002 CC_{254}	—	February 5, 2002	Palomar	NEAT	·	2.0 km	MPC · JPL
225989	2002 CE_{259}	—	February 6, 2002	Anderson Mesa	LONEOS	·	1.8 km	MPC · JPL
225990	2002 CM_{259}	—	February 6, 2002	Palomar	NEAT	ADE	3.1 km	MPC · JPL
225991 Françoisforget	2002 CK_{261}	Françoisforget	February 7, 2002	Kitt Peak	M. W. Buie	(5)	1.9 km	MPC · JPL
225992	2002 CL_{289}	—	February 10, 2002	Socorro	LINEAR	ADE	3.7 km	MPC · JPL
225993	2002 CF_{309}	—	February 10, 2002	Socorro	LINEAR	L4	15 km	MPC · JPL
225994	2002 CF_{310}	—	February 6, 2002	Palomar	NEAT	(5)	1.8 km	MPC · JPL
225995	2002 DS	—	February 17, 2002	Needville	Needville	PAD	2.6 km	MPC · JPL
225996	2002 DO_{6}	—	February 20, 2002	Kitt Peak	Spacewatch	·	3.1 km	MPC · JPL
225997	2002 DO_{7}	—	February 19, 2002	Socorro	LINEAR	·	3.7 km	MPC · JPL
225998	2002 DA_{8}	—	February 19, 2002	Socorro	LINEAR	EUN	2.2 km	MPC · JPL
225999	2002 DU_{8}	—	February 19, 2002	Socorro	LINEAR	·	3.6 km	MPC · JPL
226000	2002 DK_{11}	—	February 20, 2002	Socorro	LINEAR	·	5.8 km	MPC · JPL

back to top

== See also ==
- Meanings of minor-planet names: 225001–226000
