= Meanings of minor-planet names: 225001–226000 =

As minor planet discoveries are confirmed, they are given a permanent number by the IAU's Minor Planet Center (MPC), and the discoverers can then submit names for them, following the IAU's naming conventions. The list below concerns those minor planets in the specified number-range that have received names, and explains the meanings of those names.

Official naming citations of newly named small Solar System bodies are approved and published in a bulletin by IAU's Working Group for Small Bodies Nomenclature (WGSBN). Before May 2021, citations were published in MPC's Minor Planet Circulars for many decades. Recent citations can also be found on the JPL Small-Body Database (SBDB). Until his death in 2016, German astronomer Lutz D. Schmadel compiled these citations into the Dictionary of Minor Planet Names (DMP) and regularly updated the collection.

Based on Paul Herget's The Names of the Minor Planets, Schmadel also researched the unclear origin of numerous asteroids, most of which had been named prior to World War II. This article incorporates text from this source, which is in the public domain: SBDB New namings may only be added to this list below after official publication as the preannouncement of names is condemned. The WGSBN publishes a comprehensive guideline for the naming rules of non-cometary small Solar System bodies.

== 225001–225100 ==
| Named minor planet | Provisional | This minor planet was named for... | Ref · Catalog |
|---|---|---|---|
| 225033 Maskoliunas | 2007 FM_{35} | Marius Maskoliunas (born 1972), a Lithuanian astronomer and discoverer of minor planets, known for his work on stellar photometry, galactic structure and gravitational microlensing. | IAU · 225033 |
| 225076 Vallemare | 2007 JT_{2} | The Italian village of Vallemare, Lazio, where the Vallemare di Borbona Observatory (A55) of the discoverer Vincenzo Silvano Casulli is located | JPL · 225076 |
| 225088 Gonggong | 2007 OR_{10} | Gonggong, from Chinese mythology is a water god with red hair and a serpent-like tail. He is known for creating chaos, causing flooding, and tilting the Earth; he is often depicted with the head of a human and the body of a snake. Gonggong is often attended by his minister, Xiangliu, a nine-headed poisonous snake monster for whom the satellite is named. | JPL · 225088 |
| 225096 Kovácsgéza | 2008 DU | Géza Kovács, Hungarian astrophysicist. | IAU · 225096 |

== 225101–225200 ==
back to top

| Named minor planet | Provisional | This minor planet was named for... | Ref · Catalog |
|---|---|---|---|
There are no named minor planets in this number range

== 225201–225300 ==
back to top

| Named minor planet | Provisional | This minor planet was named for... | Ref · Catalog |
|---|---|---|---|
| 225225 Ninagrünewald | 2008 SZ_{82} | Nina Grünewald (born 2001), granddaughter of German discoverer Rolf Apitzsch | JPL · 225225 |
| 225231 Orhazoltán | 2009 HE_{12} | Zoltán Orha, Hungarian astronomer, journalist, teacher and television specialist. | IAU · 225231 |
| 225232 Kircheva | 2009 OD_{2} | Krassymira Kircheva (born 1970), a Bulgarian engineer who contributed to the acquisition of astrometric observations in Bulgaria | JPL · 225232 |
| 225238 Hristobotev | 2009 QJ_{5} | Hristo Botev (1848–1876), a Bulgarian poet and national revolutionary | JPL · 225238 |
| 225239 Ruthproell | 2009 QG_{8} | Elsa Anna Ruth Proell (born 1923), the mother-in-law of German discoverer Rolf Apitzsch | JPL · 225239 |
| 225250 Georgfranziska | 2009 QU_{36} | Georg (1835–1902) and Franziska Speyer (1844–1909), founders of the "Georg und Franziska Speyer'sche Hochschulstiftung", and members of the Speyer family, a prominent Jewish family of German descent | JPL · 225250 |
| 225254 Flury | 2009 RL_{2} | Walter Flury (born 1943), a pioneer in space debris research and a recognized expert in celestial mechanics. | JPL · 225254 |
| 225276 Leïtos | 1436 T-2 | Leïtos, from Greek mythology. He was the son of Alektryon, leader of the Boeotians, and was wounded by Hektor in the Trojan War. | JPL · 225276 |
| 225277 Stino | 1960 SN | "Stinknormal" (SN), the German word for "boringly normal", inspired by the letters "SN" in the provisional designation of this ordinary main-belt asteroid | JPL · 225277 |

== 225301–225400 ==
back to top

| Named minor planet | Provisional | This minor planet was named for... | Ref · Catalog |
|---|---|---|---|
| 225321 Stevenkoenig | 1997 XP_{7} | Steven Koenig (born 1985), an American amateur astronomer and developer of optical innovations in astrophototography. He is the son of Dean Koenig (see 15321 Donnadean) who has been restoring and repairing telescopes. | IAU · 225321 |

== 225401–225500 ==
back to top

| Named minor planet | Provisional | This minor planet was named for... | Ref · Catalog |
|---|---|---|---|
| 225438 Jacobfirer | 2000 CC_{110} | Jacob Firer (born 1956), American engineer who specialises in engineering analysis, design, testing, and operations. | IAU · 225438 |

== 225501–225600 ==
back to top

| Named minor planet | Provisional | This minor planet was named for... | Ref · Catalog |
|---|---|---|---|
There are no named minor planets in this number range

== 225601–225700 ==
back to top

| Named minor planet | Provisional | This minor planet was named for... | Ref · Catalog |
|---|---|---|---|
There are no named minor planets in this number range

== 225701–225800 ==
back to top

| Named minor planet | Provisional | This minor planet was named for... | Ref · Catalog |
|---|---|---|---|
| 225711 Danyzy | 2001 QT_{288} | Augustin Danyzy (1698–1777), an astronomer, mathematician and hydrographer, member of the Montpellier Royal Society of Sciences (French: Académie des sciences et lettres de Montpellie), and responsible for the construction of the Montpellier Observatory (003) | JPL · 225711 |

== 225801–225900 ==
back to top

| Named minor planet | Provisional | This minor planet was named for... | Ref · Catalog |
|---|---|---|---|
There are no named minor planets in this number range

== 225901–226000 ==
back to top

| Named minor planet | Provisional | This minor planet was named for... | Ref · Catalog |
|---|---|---|---|
| 225991 Françoisforget | 2002 CK_{261} | François Forget (born 1967), French scientist and member of the New Horizons plasma and atmospheres science team. | IAU · 225991 |

back to top

| Preceded by 224,001–225,000 | Meanings of minor-planet names List of minor planets: 225,001–226,000 | Succeeded by 226,001–227,000 |
