= Eli Maor =

Israeli mathematician and historian (b. 1937)

- אלי מאור
- Born: October 4, 1937 (age 88); Israel
- Occupation: Historian of mathematics
- Employer: Loyola University Chicago

Eli Maor (Hebrew: אלי מאור; born 4 October 1937) is a mathematician and historian of mathematics, best known for several books about mathematics and its history written for a popular audience.

Eli Maor received his BS at the Hebrew University of Jerusalem and his PhD at the Technion – Israel Institute of Technology for his work on musical acoustics under Franz Ollendorff. He taught mathematics at the University of the Negev and the University of Wisconsin. From 1995 he taught the history of mathematics at Loyola University Chicago. Maor was the editor of the article on trigonometry for the Encyclopædia Britannica.

Asteroid 226861 Elimaor, discovered at the Jarnac Observatory in 2004, was named in his honor. The official naming citation was published by the Minor Planet Center on 22 July 2013 (M.P.C. 84383).

== Selected works ==
- To Infinity and Beyond: A Cultural History of the Infinite, 1991, Princeton University Press. ISBN 978-0-691-02511-7
- e: The story of a Number, by Eli Maor, Princeton University Press (Princeton, New Jersey) (1994) ISBN 0-691-05854-7
- Venus in Transit, 2000, Princeton University Press. ISBN 0-691-04874-6
- Trigonometric Delights, Princeton University Press, 2002 ISBN 0-691-09541-8. Ebook version, in PDF format, full text presented.
- The Pythagorean Theorem: A 4,000-Year History, 2007, Princeton University Press, ISBN 978-0-691-12526-8
- The Facts on File Calculus Handbook (Facts on File, 2003), 2005, Checkmark Books, an encyclopedia of calculus concepts geared for high school and college students
- Music by the Numbers. Princeton University Press. 2018. ISBN 9780691176901.
