= Meanings of minor-planet names: 226001–227000 =

As minor planet discoveries are confirmed, they are given a permanent number by the IAU's Minor Planet Center (MPC), and the discoverers can then submit names for them, following the IAU's naming conventions. The list below concerns those minor planets in the specified number-range that have received names, and explains the meanings of those names.

Official naming citations of newly named small Solar System bodies are approved and published in a bulletin by IAU's Working Group for Small Bodies Nomenclature (WGSBN). Before May 2021, citations were published in MPC's Minor Planet Circulars for many decades. Recent citations can also be found on the JPL Small-Body Database (SBDB). Until his death in 2016, German astronomer Lutz D. Schmadel compiled these citations into the Dictionary of Minor Planet Names (DMP) and regularly updated the collection.

Based on Paul Herget's The Names of the Minor Planets, Schmadel also researched the unclear origin of numerous asteroids, most of which had been named prior to World War II. This article incorporates text from this source, which is in the public domain: SBDB New namings may only be added to this list below after official publication as the preannouncement of names is condemned. The WGSBN publishes a comprehensive guideline for the naming rules of non-cometary small Solar System bodies.

== 226001–226100 ==
Named minor planet	Provisional	This minor planet was named for...	Ref · Catalog
There are no named minor planets in this number range

== 226101–226200 ==
back to top

Named minor planet	Provisional	This minor planet was named for...	Ref · Catalog
There are no named minor planets in this number range

== 226201–226300 ==
back to top

Named minor planet	Provisional	This minor planet was named for...	Ref · Catalog
There are no named minor planets in this number range

== 226301–226400 ==
back to top

Named minor planet	Provisional	This minor planet was named for...	Ref · Catalog
226356 Madelinefosbury	2003 GN_{52}	Madeline N. Fosbury (born 1986), American engineer who worked on New Horizons.	JPL · 226356

== 226401–226500 ==
back to top

Named minor planet	Provisional	This minor planet was named for...	Ref · Catalog
There are no named minor planets in this number range

== 226501–226600 ==
back to top

Named minor planet	Provisional	This minor planet was named for...	Ref · Catalog
There are no named minor planets in this number range

== 226601–226700 ==
back to top

Named minor planet	Provisional	This minor planet was named for...	Ref · Catalog
226672 Kucinskas	2004 HH_{5}	Arunas Kucinskas (born 1967), a professor at the Astronomical Observatory of Vilnius University.	JPL · 226672

== 226701–226800 ==
back to top

Named minor planet	Provisional	This minor planet was named for...	Ref · Catalog
There are no named minor planets in this number range

== 226801–226900 ==
back to top

Named minor planet	Provisional	This minor planet was named for...	Ref · Catalog
226858 Ivanpuluj	2004 TY_{13}	Ivan Puluj (1845–1918) was a pioneering Ukrainian-born physicist and inventor. He contributed greatly to the understanding of the properties and origin of cathode rays, the properties of X-rays, and the interpretation of X-radiation. Together with I. Kulish and I. Nechuy-Levitsky, he translated the Scriptures into Ukrainian.	IAU · 226858
226861 Elimaor	2004 TV_{18}	Eli Maor (born 1937) is a respected historian of mathematics, whose books include To Infinity and Beyond (1991), e: The Story of a Number (1994) and The Pythagorean Theorem: A 4,000 Year History (2007). To sky watchers, he is best known for his definitive history Venus in Transit (2000).	JPL · 226861

== 226901–227000 ==
back to top

Named minor planet	Provisional	This minor planet was named for...	Ref · Catalog
There are no named minor planets in this number range

back to top

Preceded by 225,001–226,000	Meanings of minor-planet names List of minor planets: 226,001–227,000	Succeeded by 227,001–228,000
