= List of minor planets: 226001–227000 =

The following is a partial list of minor planets, running from minor-planet number 226001 through 227000, inclusive. The primary data for this and other partial lists is based on JPL's "Small-Body Orbital Elements" and data available from the Minor Planet Center. Critical list information is also provided by the MPC, unless otherwise specified from Lowell Observatory. A detailed description of the table's columns and additional sources are given on the main page including a complete list of every page in this series, and a statistical break-up on the dynamical classification of minor planets.

Also see the summary list of all named bodies in numerical and alphabetical order, and the corresponding naming citations for the number range of this particular list. New namings may only be added to this list after official publication, as the preannouncement of names is condemned by the Working Group for Small Bodies Nomenclature of the International Astronomical Union.

Near-Earth obj.	MBA (inner)	MBA (outer)	Centaur
Mars-crosser	MBA (middle)	Jupiter trojan	Trans-Neptunian obj.
Unclassified

== 226001–226100 ==
Designation			Discovery			Properties		Ref
Permanent	Provisional	Named after	Date	Site	Discoverer(s)	Category	Diam.	Ref
226001	2002 DT_{11}	—	February 20, 2002	Palomar	NEAT	·	1.9 km	MPC · JPL
226002	2002 DK_{12}	—	February 21, 2002	Palomar	NEAT	·	3.8 km	MPC · JPL
226003	2002 DG_{20}	—	February 21, 2002	Kitt Peak	Spacewatch	·	2.3 km	MPC · JPL
226004	2002 EB	—	March 3, 2002	Socorro	LINEAR	·	4.5 km	MPC · JPL
226005	2002 EP_{14}	—	March 6, 2002	Palomar	NEAT	L4	10 km	MPC · JPL
226006	2002 EZ_{18}	—	March 9, 2002	Kitt Peak	Spacewatch	HOF	2.6 km	MPC · JPL
226007	2002 ED_{19}	—	March 9, 2002	Palomar	NEAT	·	3.7 km	MPC · JPL
226008	2002 EM_{32}	—	March 10, 2002	Haleakala	NEAT	·	2.8 km	MPC · JPL
226009	2002 ES_{45}	—	March 11, 2002	Palomar	NEAT	AGN	1.9 km	MPC · JPL
226010	2002 EF_{50}	—	March 12, 2002	Palomar	NEAT	·	2.7 km	MPC · JPL
226011	2002 EX_{52}	—	March 9, 2002	Socorro	LINEAR	·	2.1 km	MPC · JPL
226012	2002 EG_{58}	—	March 13, 2002	Socorro	LINEAR	·	4.1 km	MPC · JPL
226013	2002 ER_{61}	—	March 13, 2002	Socorro	LINEAR	·	3.1 km	MPC · JPL
226014	2002 EG_{80}	—	March 12, 2002	Palomar	NEAT	GEF	4.3 km	MPC · JPL
226015	2002 EB_{84}	—	March 9, 2002	Socorro	LINEAR	·	2.1 km	MPC · JPL
226016	2002 EN_{84}	—	March 9, 2002	Socorro	LINEAR	KOR	2.3 km	MPC · JPL
226017	2002 EM_{94}	—	March 14, 2002	Socorro	LINEAR	·	2.6 km	MPC · JPL
226018	2002 EQ_{102}	—	March 6, 2002	Palomar	NEAT	·	3.1 km	MPC · JPL
226019	2002 EV_{105}	—	March 9, 2002	Anderson Mesa	LONEOS	·	1.8 km	MPC · JPL
226020	2002 EN_{110}	—	March 9, 2002	Catalina	CSS	·	3.1 km	MPC · JPL
226021	2002 EC_{112}	—	March 9, 2002	Kitt Peak	Spacewatch	·	2.4 km	MPC · JPL
226022	2002 EX_{112}	—	March 10, 2002	Kitt Peak	Spacewatch	L4	10 km	MPC · JPL
226023	2002 EY_{115}	—	March 10, 2002	Haleakala	NEAT	EUN	2.3 km	MPC · JPL
226024	2002 EG_{123}	—	March 12, 2002	Anderson Mesa	LONEOS	·	2.3 km	MPC · JPL
226025	2002 EA_{125}	—	March 12, 2002	Palomar	NEAT	·	2.8 km	MPC · JPL
226026	2002 EA_{127}	—	March 12, 2002	Palomar	NEAT	·	3.6 km	MPC · JPL
226027	2002 EK_{127}	—	March 12, 2002	Kitt Peak	Spacewatch	L4 · 006	13 km	MPC · JPL
226028	2002 ED_{128}	—	March 12, 2002	Palomar	NEAT	·	2.2 km	MPC · JPL
226029	2002 EQ_{141}	—	March 12, 2002	Palomar	NEAT	·	2.6 km	MPC · JPL
226030	2002 ER_{153}	—	March 12, 2002	Mount Nyukasa	National Aerospace Laboratory of Japan	L4	10 km	MPC · JPL
226031	2002 FX_{8}	—	March 16, 2002	Socorro	LINEAR	·	2.4 km	MPC · JPL
226032	2002 FN_{16}	—	March 16, 2002	Haleakala	NEAT	·	1.9 km	MPC · JPL
226033	2002 FR_{18}	—	March 18, 2002	Kitt Peak	M. W. Buie	L4	10 km	MPC · JPL
226034	2002 FH_{29}	—	March 20, 2002	Socorro	LINEAR	·	2.1 km	MPC · JPL
226035	2002 FR_{29}	—	March 20, 2002	Socorro	LINEAR	·	2.5 km	MPC · JPL
226036	2002 FC_{32}	—	March 20, 2002	Anderson Mesa	LONEOS	L4	12 km	MPC · JPL
226037	2002 FZ_{35}	—	March 21, 2002	Socorro	LINEAR	·	4.5 km	MPC · JPL
226038	2002 FW_{38}	—	March 30, 2002	Palomar	NEAT	·	1.9 km	MPC · JPL
226039	2002 GB_{13}	—	April 14, 2002	Socorro	LINEAR	·	4.7 km	MPC · JPL
226040	2002 GF_{18}	—	April 13, 2002	Kitt Peak	Spacewatch	BRA	2.3 km	MPC · JPL
226041	2002 GJ_{35}	—	April 2, 2002	Socorro	LINEAR	H	1.0 km	MPC · JPL
226042	2002 GE_{44}	—	April 4, 2002	Palomar	NEAT	·	2.0 km	MPC · JPL
226043	2002 GD_{57}	—	April 8, 2002	Kitt Peak	Spacewatch	H	730 m	MPC · JPL
226044	2002 GE_{66}	—	April 8, 2002	Palomar	NEAT	KOR	2.6 km	MPC · JPL
226045	2002 GA_{72}	—	April 9, 2002	Anderson Mesa	LONEOS	·	3.2 km	MPC · JPL
226046	2002 GV_{75}	—	April 9, 2002	Socorro	LINEAR	·	1.2 km	MPC · JPL
226047	2002 GL_{85}	—	April 10, 2002	Socorro	LINEAR	AGN	2.0 km	MPC · JPL
226048	2002 GO_{88}	—	April 10, 2002	Socorro	LINEAR	·	3.3 km	MPC · JPL
226049	2002 GC_{89}	—	April 10, 2002	Socorro	LINEAR	·	4.4 km	MPC · JPL
226050	2002 GT_{112}	—	April 10, 2002	Socorro	LINEAR	·	2.3 km	MPC · JPL
226051	2002 GC_{113}	—	April 11, 2002	Anderson Mesa	LONEOS	·	6.2 km	MPC · JPL
226052	2002 GW_{116}	—	April 11, 2002	Socorro	LINEAR	·	5.9 km	MPC · JPL
226053	2002 GD_{118}	—	April 12, 2002	Palomar	NEAT	L4	10 km	MPC · JPL
226054	2002 GP_{128}	—	April 12, 2002	Socorro	LINEAR	·	5.5 km	MPC · JPL
226055	2002 GK_{134}	—	April 12, 2002	Socorro	LINEAR	AGN	1.7 km	MPC · JPL
226056	2002 GC_{137}	—	April 12, 2002	Socorro	LINEAR	EUP	5.8 km	MPC · JPL
226057	2002 GG_{138}	—	April 12, 2002	Kitt Peak	Spacewatch	GEF	1.9 km	MPC · JPL
226058	2002 GO_{145}	—	April 12, 2002	Kitt Peak	Spacewatch	·	2.7 km	MPC · JPL
226059	2002 GN_{148}	—	April 14, 2002	Socorro	LINEAR	AGN	1.6 km	MPC · JPL
226060	2002 GV_{160}	—	April 15, 2002	Palomar	NEAT	·	2.6 km	MPC · JPL
226061	2002 GT_{164}	—	April 14, 2002	Palomar	NEAT	·	2.6 km	MPC · JPL
226062	2002 GN_{169}	—	April 9, 2002	Socorro	LINEAR	MRX	1.7 km	MPC · JPL
226063	2002 GJ_{171}	—	April 10, 2002	Socorro	LINEAR	·	2.7 km	MPC · JPL
226064	2002 GU_{184}	—	April 13, 2002	Kitt Peak	Spacewatch	·	2.5 km	MPC · JPL
226065	2002 HE_{9}	—	April 16, 2002	Socorro	LINEAR	·	3.3 km	MPC · JPL
226066	2002 HK_{9}	—	April 16, 2002	Socorro	LINEAR	·	3.5 km	MPC · JPL
226067	2002 HQ_{14}	—	April 17, 2002	Kitt Peak	Spacewatch	L4 · ERY	14 km	MPC · JPL
226068	2002 JC_{18}	—	May 7, 2002	Palomar	NEAT	EOS	2.6 km	MPC · JPL
226069	2002 JX_{41}	—	May 8, 2002	Socorro	LINEAR	·	3.8 km	MPC · JPL
226070	2002 JQ_{68}	—	May 6, 2002	Socorro	LINEAR	ADE	4.9 km	MPC · JPL
226071	2002 JR_{85}	—	May 11, 2002	Socorro	LINEAR	·	2.8 km	MPC · JPL
226072	2002 JW_{102}	—	May 9, 2002	Socorro	LINEAR	·	6.1 km	MPC · JPL
226073	2002 JA_{103}	—	May 9, 2002	Socorro	LINEAR	·	4.0 km	MPC · JPL
226074	2002 JD_{108}	—	May 14, 2002	Palomar	NEAT	·	3.3 km	MPC · JPL
226075	2002 JM_{128}	—	May 7, 2002	Palomar	NEAT	EOS	2.7 km	MPC · JPL
226076	2002 JZ_{137}	—	May 9, 2002	Palomar	NEAT	EOS	2.7 km	MPC · JPL
226077	2002 JD_{138}	—	May 9, 2002	Palomar	NEAT	·	820 m	MPC · JPL
226078	2002 KG_{16}	—	May 25, 2002	Palomar	NEAT	·	5.3 km	MPC · JPL
226079	2002 LO	—	June 2, 2002	Palomar	NEAT	EUP	5.6 km	MPC · JPL
226080	2002 LT_{14}	—	June 6, 2002	Socorro	LINEAR	EOS	4.0 km	MPC · JPL
226081	2002 LL_{17}	—	June 6, 2002	Socorro	LINEAR	TIR	4.7 km	MPC · JPL
226082	2002 LQ_{20}	—	June 6, 2002	Socorro	LINEAR	·	990 m	MPC · JPL
226083	2002 LW_{21}	—	June 8, 2002	Socorro	LINEAR	T_{j} (2.98) · EUP	8.0 km	MPC · JPL
226084	2002 LB_{34}	—	June 9, 2002	Socorro	LINEAR	·	3.4 km	MPC · JPL
226085	2002 LN_{51}	—	June 9, 2002	Socorro	LINEAR	·	2.7 km	MPC · JPL
226086	2002 LG_{52}	—	June 9, 2002	Palomar	NEAT	·	3.2 km	MPC · JPL
226087	2002 NM_{26}	—	July 9, 2002	Socorro	LINEAR	·	1.1 km	MPC · JPL
226088	2002 NX_{45}	—	July 13, 2002	Palomar	NEAT	·	1.4 km	MPC · JPL
226089	2002 NA_{57}	—	July 14, 2002	Palomar	S. F. Hönig	·	960 m	MPC · JPL
226090	2002 NQ_{60}	—	July 12, 2002	Palomar	NEAT	·	3.7 km	MPC · JPL
226091	2002 OX_{5}	—	July 20, 2002	Palomar	NEAT	·	4.8 km	MPC · JPL
226092	2002 OC_{10}	—	July 21, 2002	Palomar	NEAT	·	1.0 km	MPC · JPL
226093	2002 OG_{13}	—	July 18, 2002	Socorro	LINEAR	·	4.6 km	MPC · JPL
226094	2002 OS_{15}	—	July 18, 2002	Socorro	LINEAR	·	5.3 km	MPC · JPL
226095	2002 OU_{16}	—	July 18, 2002	Socorro	LINEAR	·	5.0 km	MPC · JPL
226096	2002 OP_{17}	—	July 18, 2002	Socorro	LINEAR	·	920 m	MPC · JPL
226097	2002 OM_{26}	—	July 29, 2002	Palomar	NEAT	VER	4.1 km	MPC · JPL
226098	2002 PE_{4}	—	August 4, 2002	Palomar	NEAT	VER	4.8 km	MPC · JPL
226099	2002 PV_{19}	—	August 6, 2002	Palomar	NEAT	·	2.3 km	MPC · JPL
226100	2002 PO_{20}	—	August 6, 2002	Palomar	NEAT	·	3.4 km	MPC · JPL

== 226101–226200 ==
back to top

Designation			Discovery			Properties		Ref
Permanent	Provisional	Named after	Date	Site	Discoverer(s)	Category	Diam.	Ref
226101	2002 PL_{32}	—	August 6, 2002	Palomar	NEAT	·	2.4 km	MPC · JPL
226102	2002 PS_{36}	—	August 6, 2002	Palomar	NEAT	·	910 m	MPC · JPL
226103	2002 PW_{47}	—	August 10, 2002	Socorro	LINEAR	·	980 m	MPC · JPL
226104	2002 PO_{57}	—	August 9, 2002	Socorro	LINEAR	·	2.0 km	MPC · JPL
226105	2002 PV_{66}	—	August 6, 2002	Palomar	NEAT	·	910 m	MPC · JPL
226106	2002 PN_{79}	—	August 11, 2002	Palomar	NEAT	·	970 m	MPC · JPL
226107	2002 PZ_{90}	—	August 13, 2002	Socorro	LINEAR	·	1.1 km	MPC · JPL
226108	2002 PV_{97}	—	August 14, 2002	Socorro	LINEAR	·	1.2 km	MPC · JPL
226109	2002 PU_{98}	—	August 14, 2002	Socorro	LINEAR	·	1.1 km	MPC · JPL
226110	2002 PZ_{117}	—	August 13, 2002	Palomar	NEAT	·	5.8 km	MPC · JPL
226111	2002 PH_{120}	—	August 13, 2002	Anderson Mesa	LONEOS	·	5.6 km	MPC · JPL
226112	2002 PJ_{128}	—	August 14, 2002	Socorro	LINEAR	·	1.1 km	MPC · JPL
226113	2002 PZ_{129}	—	August 15, 2002	Anderson Mesa	LONEOS	·	1.2 km	MPC · JPL
226114	2002 PD_{133}	—	August 14, 2002	Socorro	LINEAR	·	970 m	MPC · JPL
226115	2002 PF_{157}	—	August 8, 2002	Palomar	S. F. Hönig	·	5.8 km	MPC · JPL
226116	2002 PE_{168}	—	August 11, 2002	Palomar	NEAT	·	800 m	MPC · JPL
226117	2002 PA_{181}	—	August 15, 2002	Palomar	NEAT	·	4.0 km	MPC · JPL
226118	2002 PB_{182}	—	August 15, 2002	Palomar	NEAT	·	3.3 km	MPC · JPL
226119	2002 PN_{182}	—	August 11, 2002	Palomar	NEAT	(2076)	1.2 km	MPC · JPL
226120	2002 PP_{190}	—	August 15, 2002	Palomar	NEAT	·	570 m	MPC · JPL
226121	2002 QG_{4}	—	August 16, 2002	Haleakala	NEAT	·	3.7 km	MPC · JPL
226122	2002 QH_{59}	—	August 18, 2002	Palomar	NEAT	·	820 m	MPC · JPL
226123	2002 QY_{67}	—	August 28, 2002	Palomar	NEAT	·	5.2 km	MPC · JPL
226124	2002 QL_{68}	—	August 29, 2002	Palomar	NEAT	·	4.2 km	MPC · JPL
226125	2002 QM_{73}	—	August 29, 2002	Palomar	NEAT	·	830 m	MPC · JPL
226126	2002 RP_{14}	—	September 4, 2002	Anderson Mesa	LONEOS	·	780 m	MPC · JPL
226127	2002 RQ_{17}	—	September 4, 2002	Anderson Mesa	LONEOS	·	1.1 km	MPC · JPL
226128	2002 RU_{19}	—	September 4, 2002	Anderson Mesa	LONEOS	·	960 m	MPC · JPL
226129	2002 RG_{22}	—	September 4, 2002	Anderson Mesa	LONEOS	·	930 m	MPC · JPL
226130	2002 RM_{33}	—	September 4, 2002	Anderson Mesa	LONEOS	·	1.9 km	MPC · JPL
226131	2002 RA_{44}	—	September 5, 2002	Socorro	LINEAR	·	1.2 km	MPC · JPL
226132	2002 RK_{77}	—	September 5, 2002	Socorro	LINEAR	·	1.0 km	MPC · JPL
226133	2002 RF_{79}	—	September 5, 2002	Socorro	LINEAR	·	1.6 km	MPC · JPL
226134	2002 RG_{79}	—	September 5, 2002	Socorro	LINEAR	·	1.1 km	MPC · JPL
226135	2002 RQ_{87}	—	September 5, 2002	Socorro	LINEAR	·	2.3 km	MPC · JPL
226136	2002 RV_{93}	—	September 5, 2002	Anderson Mesa	LONEOS	·	900 m	MPC · JPL
226137	2002 RS_{98}	—	September 5, 2002	Anderson Mesa	LONEOS	·	1.8 km	MPC · JPL
226138	2002 RK_{123}	—	September 8, 2002	Haleakala	NEAT	·	1.9 km	MPC · JPL
226139	2002 RQ_{123}	—	September 9, 2002	Campo Imperatore	CINEOS	·	930 m	MPC · JPL
226140	2002 RN_{134}	—	September 10, 2002	Palomar	NEAT	V	850 m	MPC · JPL
226141	2002 RG_{138}	—	September 10, 2002	Palomar	NEAT	·	1.3 km	MPC · JPL
226142	2002 RC_{145}	—	September 11, 2002	Palomar	NEAT	·	710 m	MPC · JPL
226143	2002 RN_{157}	—	September 11, 2002	Palomar	NEAT	NYS	1.4 km	MPC · JPL
226144	2002 RN_{170}	—	September 13, 2002	Palomar	NEAT	·	1.0 km	MPC · JPL
226145	2002 RZ_{173}	—	September 13, 2002	Palomar	NEAT	·	820 m	MPC · JPL
226146	2002 RY_{242}	—	September 14, 2002	Palomar	NEAT	·	830 m	MPC · JPL
226147	2002 RU_{247}	—	September 9, 2002	Palomar	NEAT	·	770 m	MPC · JPL
226148	2002 RP_{255}	—	September 10, 2002	Palomar	NEAT	·	4.9 km	MPC · JPL
226149	2002 RM_{259}	—	September 15, 2002	Palomar	NEAT	·	940 m	MPC · JPL
226150	2002 RC_{264}	—	September 11, 2002	Palomar	NEAT	·	690 m	MPC · JPL
226151	2002 SV_{3}	—	September 26, 2002	Palomar	NEAT	·	1.0 km	MPC · JPL
226152	2002 SO_{4}	—	September 27, 2002	Palomar	NEAT	·	920 m	MPC · JPL
226153	2002 SE_{7}	—	September 27, 2002	Palomar	NEAT	·	920 m	MPC · JPL
226154	2002 SD_{18}	—	September 28, 2002	Palomar	NEAT	·	1.1 km	MPC · JPL
226155	2002 SF_{21}	—	September 26, 2002	Palomar	NEAT	NYS	1.7 km	MPC · JPL
226156	2002 SP_{31}	—	September 28, 2002	Haleakala	NEAT	·	1.3 km	MPC · JPL
226157	2002 SV_{37}	—	September 29, 2002	Haleakala	NEAT	·	1.5 km	MPC · JPL
226158	2002 SP_{44}	—	September 29, 2002	Haleakala	NEAT	·	1.2 km	MPC · JPL
226159	2002 SN_{45}	—	September 29, 2002	Kitt Peak	Spacewatch	·	2.3 km	MPC · JPL
226160	2002 SW_{49}	—	September 30, 2002	Haleakala	NEAT	·	1.2 km	MPC · JPL
226161	2002 SM_{50}	—	September 30, 2002	Haleakala	NEAT	·	1.1 km	MPC · JPL
226162	2002 TQ_{16}	—	October 2, 2002	Socorro	LINEAR	·	1.2 km	MPC · JPL
226163	2002 TG_{20}	—	October 2, 2002	Socorro	LINEAR	fast	940 m	MPC · JPL
226164	2002 TC_{24}	—	October 2, 2002	Socorro	LINEAR	·	950 m	MPC · JPL
226165	2002 TX_{43}	—	October 2, 2002	Socorro	LINEAR	·	860 m	MPC · JPL
226166	2002 TY_{43}	—	October 2, 2002	Socorro	LINEAR	·	1.1 km	MPC · JPL
226167	2002 TP_{46}	—	October 2, 2002	Socorro	LINEAR	·	1.1 km	MPC · JPL
226168	2002 TY_{55}	—	October 1, 2002	Anderson Mesa	LONEOS	·	1.2 km	MPC · JPL
226169	2002 TV_{58}	—	October 3, 2002	Socorro	LINEAR	·	870 m	MPC · JPL
226170	2002 TM_{62}	—	October 3, 2002	Campo Imperatore	CINEOS	·	1.3 km	MPC · JPL
226171	2002 TF_{71}	—	October 3, 2002	Palomar	NEAT	·	1.4 km	MPC · JPL
226172	2002 TJ_{71}	—	October 3, 2002	Palomar	NEAT	·	1.4 km	MPC · JPL
226173	2002 TU_{81}	—	October 1, 2002	Haleakala	NEAT	·	1.1 km	MPC · JPL
226174	2002 TN_{88}	—	October 3, 2002	Palomar	NEAT	·	1.2 km	MPC · JPL
226175	2002 TP_{97}	—	October 2, 2002	Campo Imperatore	CINEOS	·	1.1 km	MPC · JPL
226176	2002 TS_{103}	—	October 4, 2002	Socorro	LINEAR	·	1.1 km	MPC · JPL
226177	2002 TS_{111}	—	October 3, 2002	Socorro	LINEAR	·	1.2 km	MPC · JPL
226178	2002 TD_{134}	—	October 4, 2002	Palomar	NEAT	·	1.3 km	MPC · JPL
226179	2002 TS_{139}	—	October 4, 2002	Anderson Mesa	LONEOS	·	1.7 km	MPC · JPL
226180	2002 TT_{154}	—	October 5, 2002	Palomar	NEAT	·	1.1 km	MPC · JPL
226181	2002 TD_{157}	—	October 5, 2002	Palomar	NEAT	·	1.2 km	MPC · JPL
226182	2002 TG_{189}	—	October 5, 2002	Palomar	NEAT	·	4.0 km	MPC · JPL
226183	2002 TH_{189}	—	October 5, 2002	Socorro	LINEAR	·	1.7 km	MPC · JPL
226184	2002 TW_{195}	—	October 3, 2002	Socorro	LINEAR	V	920 m	MPC · JPL
226185	2002 TW_{204}	—	October 4, 2002	Socorro	LINEAR	·	980 m	MPC · JPL
226186	2002 TY_{222}	—	October 7, 2002	Socorro	LINEAR	(2076)	1.3 km	MPC · JPL
226187	2002 TZ_{228}	—	October 7, 2002	Haleakala	NEAT	V	1.0 km	MPC · JPL
226188	2002 TH_{230}	—	October 6, 2002	Haleakala	NEAT	·	1.2 km	MPC · JPL
226189	2002 TK_{252}	—	October 8, 2002	Anderson Mesa	LONEOS	·	1.1 km	MPC · JPL
226190	2002 TL_{252}	—	October 8, 2002	Anderson Mesa	LONEOS	·	930 m	MPC · JPL
226191	2002 TC_{257}	—	October 9, 2002	Socorro	LINEAR	·	1.8 km	MPC · JPL
226192	2002 TZ_{280}	—	October 10, 2002	Socorro	LINEAR	·	1.2 km	MPC · JPL
226193	2002 TY_{285}	—	October 10, 2002	Socorro	LINEAR	·	1.3 km	MPC · JPL
226194	2002 TW_{337}	—	October 5, 2002	Apache Point	SDSS	·	850 m	MPC · JPL
226195	2002 TW_{364}	—	October 10, 2002	Apache Point	SDSS	·	1.7 km	MPC · JPL
226196	2002 TQ_{375}	—	October 3, 2002	Socorro	LINEAR	·	670 m	MPC · JPL
226197	2002 TS_{375}	—	October 3, 2002	Socorro	LINEAR	V	750 m	MPC · JPL
226198	2002 UN_{3}	—	October 28, 2002	Palomar	NEAT	AMO	600 m	MPC · JPL
226199	2002 UL_{10}	—	October 28, 2002	Haleakala	NEAT	·	1.3 km	MPC · JPL
226200	2002 UJ_{21}	—	October 30, 2002	Kitt Peak	Spacewatch	·	1.0 km	MPC · JPL

== 226201–226300 ==
back to top

Designation			Discovery			Properties		Ref
Permanent	Provisional	Named after	Date	Site	Discoverer(s)	Category	Diam.	Ref
226201	2002 UH_{38}	—	October 31, 2002	Socorro	LINEAR	·	1.1 km	MPC · JPL
226202	2002 VS_{2}	—	November 1, 2002	Haleakala	NEAT	NYS	830 m	MPC · JPL
226203	2002 VQ_{10}	—	November 1, 2002	Palomar	NEAT	·	1.5 km	MPC · JPL
226204	2002 VX_{10}	—	November 1, 2002	Palomar	NEAT	·	1.4 km	MPC · JPL
226205	2002 VT_{12}	—	November 4, 2002	Palomar	NEAT	·	2.4 km	MPC · JPL
226206	2002 VP_{16}	—	November 5, 2002	Socorro	LINEAR	·	1.4 km	MPC · JPL
226207	2002 VP_{20}	—	November 5, 2002	La Palma	La Palma	V	790 m	MPC · JPL
226208	2002 VL_{36}	—	November 5, 2002	Socorro	LINEAR	PHO	1.6 km	MPC · JPL
226209	2002 VO_{36}	—	November 5, 2002	Anderson Mesa	LONEOS	·	1.2 km	MPC · JPL
226210	2002 VQ_{45}	—	November 5, 2002	Socorro	LINEAR	·	900 m	MPC · JPL
226211	2002 VV_{48}	—	November 5, 2002	Anderson Mesa	LONEOS	·	900 m	MPC · JPL
226212	2002 VP_{49}	—	November 5, 2002	Anderson Mesa	LONEOS	·	1.0 km	MPC · JPL
226213	2002 VR_{51}	—	November 6, 2002	Anderson Mesa	LONEOS	·	950 m	MPC · JPL
226214	2002 VV_{58}	—	November 6, 2002	Haleakala	NEAT	·	2.7 km	MPC · JPL
226215	2002 VX_{61}	—	November 5, 2002	Socorro	LINEAR	(2076)	1.1 km	MPC · JPL
226216	2002 VF_{63}	—	November 6, 2002	Anderson Mesa	LONEOS	·	1.4 km	MPC · JPL
226217	2002 VX_{63}	—	November 6, 2002	Anderson Mesa	LONEOS	·	1.4 km	MPC · JPL
226218	2002 VN_{66}	—	November 6, 2002	Socorro	LINEAR	·	2.3 km	MPC · JPL
226219	2002 VT_{85}	—	November 12, 2002	Socorro	LINEAR	AMO +1km	820 m	MPC · JPL
226220	2002 VY_{93}	—	November 12, 2002	Socorro	LINEAR	·	2.4 km	MPC · JPL
226221	2002 VJ_{94}	—	November 12, 2002	Socorro	LINEAR	·	1.6 km	MPC · JPL
226222	2002 VW_{104}	—	November 12, 2002	Socorro	LINEAR	·	1.4 km	MPC · JPL
226223	2002 VP_{106}	—	November 12, 2002	Socorro	LINEAR	·	1.3 km	MPC · JPL
226224	2002 VV_{119}	—	November 12, 2002	Socorro	LINEAR	PHO	3.9 km	MPC · JPL
226225	2002 VQ_{126}	—	November 12, 2002	Palomar	NEAT	·	1.5 km	MPC · JPL
226226	2002 VP_{131}	—	November 5, 2002	Mount Nyukasa	National Aerospace Laboratory of Japan	·	980 m	MPC · JPL
226227	2002 VV_{134}	—	November 6, 2002	Anderson Mesa	LONEOS	·	1.2 km	MPC · JPL
226228	2002 VX_{135}	—	November 7, 2002	Socorro	LINEAR	·	1.1 km	MPC · JPL
226229	2002 VL_{139}	—	November 13, 2002	Palomar	NEAT	·	1.6 km	MPC · JPL
226230	2002 VZ_{143}	—	November 4, 2002	Palomar	NEAT	·	830 m	MPC · JPL
226231	2002 WD_{6}	—	November 24, 2002	Palomar	NEAT	·	1.4 km	MPC · JPL
226232	2002 WV_{6}	—	November 24, 2002	Palomar	NEAT	NYS	1.2 km	MPC · JPL
226233	2002 WG_{20}	—	November 25, 2002	Palomar	S. F. Hönig	3:2 · SHU	6.3 km	MPC · JPL
226234	2002 WV_{29}	—	November 22, 2002	Palomar	NEAT	·	780 m	MPC · JPL
226235	2002 WH_{30}	—	November 24, 2002	Palomar	NEAT	·	970 m	MPC · JPL
226236	2002 XZ_{13}	—	December 3, 2002	Palomar	NEAT	V	990 m	MPC · JPL
226237	2002 XQ_{14}	—	December 5, 2002	Socorro	LINEAR	·	1.8 km	MPC · JPL
226238	2002 XC_{23}	—	December 5, 2002	Socorro	LINEAR	·	1.5 km	MPC · JPL
226239	2002 XZ_{25}	—	December 5, 2002	Socorro	LINEAR	NYS	2.7 km	MPC · JPL
226240	2002 XX_{31}	—	December 6, 2002	Socorro	LINEAR	V	1.0 km	MPC · JPL
226241	2002 XU_{42}	—	December 8, 2002	Desert Eagle	W. K. Y. Yeung	V	940 m	MPC · JPL
226242	2002 XQ_{43}	—	December 6, 2002	Socorro	LINEAR	·	1.3 km	MPC · JPL
226243	2002 XC_{45}	—	December 8, 2002	Haleakala	NEAT	V	1 km	MPC · JPL
226244	2002 XU_{48}	—	December 10, 2002	Socorro	LINEAR	·	1.8 km	MPC · JPL
226245	2002 XV_{52}	—	December 10, 2002	Socorro	LINEAR	NYS	1.7 km	MPC · JPL
226246	2002 XP_{60}	—	December 10, 2002	Socorro	LINEAR	·	1.8 km	MPC · JPL
226247	2002 XV_{72}	—	December 11, 2002	Socorro	LINEAR	·	1.5 km	MPC · JPL
226248	2002 XZ_{73}	—	December 11, 2002	Socorro	LINEAR	·	2.0 km	MPC · JPL
226249	2002 XQ_{75}	—	December 11, 2002	Socorro	LINEAR	(2076)	1.6 km	MPC · JPL
226250	2002 XS_{115}	—	December 5, 2002	Socorro	LINEAR	·	1.8 km	MPC · JPL
226251	2002 YS_{1}	—	December 27, 2002	Anderson Mesa	LONEOS	ERI	3.0 km	MPC · JPL
226252	2002 YC_{3}	—	December 26, 2002	Nogales	Tenagra II	PHO	1.5 km	MPC · JPL
226253	2002 YV_{6}	—	December 28, 2002	Anderson Mesa	LONEOS	·	1.6 km	MPC · JPL
226254	2002 YO_{8}	—	December 31, 2002	Socorro	LINEAR	·	2.5 km	MPC · JPL
226255	2002 YE_{24}	—	December 31, 2002	Socorro	LINEAR	·	1.4 km	MPC · JPL
226256	2002 YF_{25}	—	December 31, 2002	Socorro	LINEAR	NYS	1.5 km	MPC · JPL
226257	2002 YZ_{31}	—	December 31, 2002	Socorro	LINEAR	·	1.7 km	MPC · JPL
226258	2003 AH	—	January 1, 2003	Socorro	LINEAR	·	2.8 km	MPC · JPL
226259	2003 AQ	—	January 1, 2003	Socorro	LINEAR	·	2.5 km	MPC · JPL
226260	2003 AQ_{24}	—	January 4, 2003	Socorro	LINEAR	·	1.5 km	MPC · JPL
226261	2003 AN_{25}	—	January 4, 2003	Socorro	LINEAR	·	3.6 km	MPC · JPL
226262	2003 AD_{30}	—	January 4, 2003	Kitt Peak	Spacewatch	·	1.3 km	MPC · JPL
226263	2003 AM_{32}	—	January 5, 2003	Socorro	LINEAR	·	1.9 km	MPC · JPL
226264	2003 AS_{36}	—	January 7, 2003	Socorro	LINEAR	·	1.2 km	MPC · JPL
226265	2003 AE_{49}	—	January 5, 2003	Socorro	LINEAR	·	1.7 km	MPC · JPL
226266	2003 AM_{53}	—	January 5, 2003	Socorro	LINEAR	·	1.1 km	MPC · JPL
226267	2003 AK_{54}	—	January 5, 2003	Socorro	LINEAR	NYS	1.3 km	MPC · JPL
226268	2003 AN_{55}	—	January 5, 2003	Socorro	LINEAR	·	2.7 km	MPC · JPL
226269	2003 AC_{57}	—	January 5, 2003	Socorro	LINEAR	·	3.1 km	MPC · JPL
226270	2003 AW_{63}	—	January 8, 2003	Socorro	LINEAR	·	1.5 km	MPC · JPL
226271	2003 AU_{66}	—	January 7, 2003	Socorro	LINEAR	V	940 m	MPC · JPL
226272	2003 AC_{70}	—	January 8, 2003	Socorro	LINEAR	·	1.3 km	MPC · JPL
226273	2003 AO_{70}	—	January 10, 2003	Socorro	LINEAR	·	2.1 km	MPC · JPL
226274	2003 AP_{78}	—	January 10, 2003	Kitt Peak	Spacewatch	·	1.2 km	MPC · JPL
226275	2003 AG_{80}	—	January 10, 2003	Socorro	LINEAR	·	2.9 km	MPC · JPL
226276	2003 AC_{81}	—	January 11, 2003	Socorro	LINEAR	PHO	1.4 km	MPC · JPL
226277	2003 AR_{92}	—	January 9, 2003	Socorro	LINEAR	NYS	1.8 km	MPC · JPL
226278	2003 AY_{92}	—	January 9, 2003	Socorro	LINEAR	·	1.6 km	MPC · JPL
226279	2003 BN	—	January 23, 2003	Needville	J. Dellinger	MAS	1.1 km	MPC · JPL
226280	2003 BU_{2}	—	January 26, 2003	Anderson Mesa	LONEOS	·	2.0 km	MPC · JPL
226281	2003 BG_{6}	—	January 23, 2003	Kvistaberg	Uppsala-DLR Asteroid Survey	·	1.7 km	MPC · JPL
226282	2003 BS_{13}	—	January 26, 2003	Haleakala	NEAT	·	2.2 km	MPC · JPL
226283	2003 BH_{15}	—	January 26, 2003	Haleakala	NEAT	NYS	1.7 km	MPC · JPL
226284	2003 BC_{17}	—	January 26, 2003	Haleakala	NEAT	·	1.6 km	MPC · JPL
226285	2003 BR_{20}	—	January 27, 2003	Socorro	LINEAR	·	1.6 km	MPC · JPL
226286	2003 BC_{29}	—	January 27, 2003	Anderson Mesa	LONEOS	NYS	1.7 km	MPC · JPL
226287	2003 BB_{30}	—	January 27, 2003	Socorro	LINEAR	·	1.9 km	MPC · JPL
226288	2003 BB_{35}	—	January 27, 2003	Socorro	LINEAR	3:2	4.6 km	MPC · JPL
226289	2003 BD_{38}	—	January 27, 2003	Anderson Mesa	LONEOS	MAS	1.1 km	MPC · JPL
226290	2003 BL_{38}	—	January 27, 2003	Anderson Mesa	LONEOS	·	2.2 km	MPC · JPL
226291	2003 BX_{41}	—	January 29, 2003	Kitt Peak	Spacewatch	·	1.6 km	MPC · JPL
226292	2003 BF_{50}	—	January 27, 2003	Socorro	LINEAR	V	940 m	MPC · JPL
226293	2003 BT_{50}	—	January 27, 2003	Socorro	LINEAR	V	950 m	MPC · JPL
226294	2003 BV_{52}	—	January 27, 2003	Anderson Mesa	LONEOS	·	1.3 km	MPC · JPL
226295	2003 BH_{61}	—	January 27, 2003	Haleakala	NEAT	HIL · 3:2	7.2 km	MPC · JPL
226296	2003 BO_{65}	—	January 30, 2003	Anderson Mesa	LONEOS	·	1.9 km	MPC · JPL
226297	2003 BP_{68}	—	January 28, 2003	Kitt Peak	Spacewatch	·	1.6 km	MPC · JPL
226298	2003 BY_{68}	—	January 29, 2003	Palomar	NEAT	·	1.4 km	MPC · JPL
226299	2003 BJ_{69}	—	January 29, 2003	Kvistaberg	Uppsala-DLR Asteroid Survey	NYS	1.4 km	MPC · JPL
226300	2003 BK_{69}	—	January 30, 2003	Kitt Peak	Spacewatch	NYS	1.3 km	MPC · JPL

== 226301–226400 ==
back to top

Designation			Discovery			Properties		Ref
Permanent	Provisional	Named after	Date	Site	Discoverer(s)	Category	Diam.	Ref
226301	2003 BP_{74}	—	January 29, 2003	Palomar	NEAT	·	1.9 km	MPC · JPL
226302	2003 BR_{75}	—	January 29, 2003	Palomar	NEAT	·	1.9 km	MPC · JPL
226303	2003 BL_{77}	—	January 30, 2003	Anderson Mesa	LONEOS	·	2.0 km	MPC · JPL
226304	2003 BE_{82}	—	January 30, 2003	Anderson Mesa	LONEOS	NYS	1.9 km	MPC · JPL
226305	2003 BR_{89}	—	January 28, 2003	Socorro	LINEAR	·	1.8 km	MPC · JPL
226306	2003 BP_{90}	—	January 30, 2003	Anderson Mesa	LONEOS	PHO	2.9 km	MPC · JPL
226307	2003 BA_{92}	—	January 30, 2003	Anderson Mesa	LONEOS	·	1.8 km	MPC · JPL
226308	2003 CN_{2}	—	February 1, 2003	Haleakala	NEAT	·	2.4 km	MPC · JPL
226309	2003 CN_{4}	—	February 1, 2003	Socorro	LINEAR	MAS	1.0 km	MPC · JPL
226310	2003 CA_{6}	—	February 1, 2003	Socorro	LINEAR	NYS	1.9 km	MPC · JPL
226311	2003 CX_{7}	—	February 1, 2003	Socorro	LINEAR	NYS	1.7 km	MPC · JPL
226312	2003 CN_{12}	—	February 2, 2003	Palomar	NEAT	·	1.3 km	MPC · JPL
226313	2003 CH_{19}	—	February 8, 2003	Socorro	LINEAR	MAS	980 m	MPC · JPL
226314	2003 DU_{3}	—	February 22, 2003	Palomar	NEAT	NYS	1.3 km	MPC · JPL
226315	2003 DD_{6}	—	February 22, 2003	Palomar	NEAT	·	2.7 km	MPC · JPL
226316	2003 DU_{11}	—	February 25, 2003	Campo Imperatore	CINEOS	MAS	850 m	MPC · JPL
226317	2003 DJ_{13}	—	February 27, 2003	Kleť	M. Tichý, Kočer, M.	·	1.4 km	MPC · JPL
226318	2003 DG_{18}	—	February 19, 2003	Palomar	NEAT	·	1.9 km	MPC · JPL
226319	2003 DQ_{20}	—	February 22, 2003	Palomar	NEAT	NYS	1.5 km	MPC · JPL
226320	2003 EK_{3}	—	March 6, 2003	Socorro	LINEAR	·	1.8 km	MPC · JPL
226321	2003 EP_{3}	—	March 6, 2003	Socorro	LINEAR	·	2.2 km	MPC · JPL
226322	2003 EL_{18}	—	March 6, 2003	Anderson Mesa	LONEOS	NYS	1.4 km	MPC · JPL
226323	2003 EM_{18}	—	March 6, 2003	Anderson Mesa	LONEOS	·	2.1 km	MPC · JPL
226324	2003 EB_{26}	—	March 6, 2003	Anderson Mesa	LONEOS	NYS	1.6 km	MPC · JPL
226325	2003 ER_{26}	—	March 6, 2003	Anderson Mesa	LONEOS	·	2.2 km	MPC · JPL
226326	2003 ED_{29}	—	March 6, 2003	Socorro	LINEAR	·	3.4 km	MPC · JPL
226327	2003 EE_{34}	—	March 7, 2003	Socorro	LINEAR	·	1.5 km	MPC · JPL
226328	2003 ET_{36}	—	March 8, 2003	Anderson Mesa	LONEOS	MAR	1.5 km	MPC · JPL
226329	2003 EX_{41}	—	March 7, 2003	Palomar	NEAT	·	2.0 km	MPC · JPL
226330	2003 EA_{49}	—	March 9, 2003	Socorro	LINEAR	MIS	4.1 km	MPC · JPL
226331	2003 FL	—	March 22, 2003	Wrightwood	J. W. Young	·	1.5 km	MPC · JPL
226332	2003 FE_{22}	—	March 25, 2003	Kitt Peak	Spacewatch	·	1.7 km	MPC · JPL
226333	2003 FB_{40}	—	March 24, 2003	Kitt Peak	Spacewatch	·	2.5 km	MPC · JPL
226334	2003 FV_{41}	—	March 25, 2003	Haleakala	NEAT	·	1.6 km	MPC · JPL
226335	2003 FS_{46}	—	March 24, 2003	Kitt Peak	Spacewatch	·	1.2 km	MPC · JPL
226336	2003 FX_{47}	—	March 24, 2003	Kitt Peak	Spacewatch	·	1.5 km	MPC · JPL
226337	2003 FA_{66}	—	March 26, 2003	Kitt Peak	Spacewatch	·	3.3 km	MPC · JPL
226338	2003 FQ_{71}	—	March 26, 2003	Kitt Peak	Spacewatch	·	2.4 km	MPC · JPL
226339	2003 FO_{72}	—	March 26, 2003	Palomar	NEAT	·	2.1 km	MPC · JPL
226340	2003 FH_{77}	—	March 27, 2003	Palomar	NEAT	·	1.6 km	MPC · JPL
226341	2003 FE_{80}	—	March 27, 2003	Palomar	NEAT	(5)	1.8 km	MPC · JPL
226342	2003 FV_{81}	—	March 27, 2003	Kitt Peak	Spacewatch	NYS	1.6 km	MPC · JPL
226343	2003 FL_{120}	—	March 23, 2003	Kitt Peak	Spacewatch	·	1.8 km	MPC · JPL
226344	2003 FX_{121}	—	March 25, 2003	Anderson Mesa	LONEOS	·	1.9 km	MPC · JPL
226345	2003 FM_{122}	—	March 31, 2003	Cerro Tololo	Deep Lens Survey	·	1.1 km	MPC · JPL
226346	2003 FG_{126}	—	March 31, 2003	Kitt Peak	Spacewatch	·	1.6 km	MPC · JPL
226347	2003 FE_{132}	—	March 23, 2003	Kitt Peak	Spacewatch	·	1.7 km	MPC · JPL
226348	2003 FW_{132}	—	March 23, 2003	Kitt Peak	Spacewatch	L4	10 km	MPC · JPL
226349	2003 FL_{133}	—	March 27, 2003	Kitt Peak	Spacewatch	L4	10 km	MPC · JPL
226350	2003 GA_{8}	—	April 3, 2003	Anderson Mesa	LONEOS	·	3.9 km	MPC · JPL
226351	2003 GH_{11}	—	April 3, 2003	Anderson Mesa	LONEOS	·	1.5 km	MPC · JPL
226352	2003 GZ_{13}	—	April 4, 2003	Kitt Peak	Spacewatch	L4	10 km	MPC · JPL
226353	2003 GG_{17}	—	April 6, 2003	Socorro	LINEAR	PHO	1.9 km	MPC · JPL
226354	2003 GC_{23}	—	April 3, 2003	Anderson Mesa	LONEOS	·	3.1 km	MPC · JPL
226355	2003 GR_{24}	—	April 7, 2003	Kitt Peak	Spacewatch	L4	13 km	MPC · JPL
226356 Madelinefosbury	2003 GN_{52}	Madelinefosbury	April 1, 2003	Kitt Peak	M. W. Buie	MAS	1.2 km	MPC · JPL
226357	2003 GX_{54}	—	April 4, 2003	Kitt Peak	Spacewatch	·	1.3 km	MPC · JPL
226358	2003 GL_{56}	—	April 7, 2003	Kitt Peak	Spacewatch	L4	10 km	MPC · JPL
226359	2003 HL_{2}	—	April 25, 2003	Socorro	LINEAR	H	890 m	MPC · JPL
226360	2003 HO_{7}	—	April 24, 2003	Anderson Mesa	LONEOS	·	1.7 km	MPC · JPL
226361	2003 HP_{13}	—	April 25, 2003	Kitt Peak	Spacewatch	L4	20 km	MPC · JPL
226362	2003 HY_{27}	—	April 26, 2003	Kitt Peak	Spacewatch	ADE	3.6 km	MPC · JPL
226363	2003 HA_{29}	—	April 28, 2003	Socorro	LINEAR	·	3.3 km	MPC · JPL
226364	2003 HQ_{36}	—	April 29, 2003	Anderson Mesa	LONEOS	·	2.5 km	MPC · JPL
226365	2003 HD_{39}	—	April 29, 2003	Socorro	LINEAR	·	1.9 km	MPC · JPL
226366	2003 HG_{49}	—	April 28, 2003	Socorro	LINEAR	·	2.2 km	MPC · JPL
226367	2003 HW_{58}	—	April 28, 2003	Kitt Peak	Spacewatch	L4	10 km	MPC · JPL
226368	2003 JD_{3}	—	May 1, 2003	Kitt Peak	Spacewatch	·	1.5 km	MPC · JPL
226369	2003 JJ_{5}	—	May 1, 2003	Socorro	LINEAR	·	4.3 km	MPC · JPL
226370	2003 JZ_{5}	—	May 1, 2003	Kitt Peak	Spacewatch	MAR	1.6 km	MPC · JPL
226371	2003 JR_{7}	—	May 2, 2003	Socorro	LINEAR	·	3.3 km	MPC · JPL
226372	2003 JV_{7}	—	May 2, 2003	Socorro	LINEAR	·	2.0 km	MPC · JPL
226373	2003 JH_{10}	—	May 1, 2003	Haleakala	NEAT	·	2.1 km	MPC · JPL
226374	2003 JQ_{11}	—	May 3, 2003	Kitt Peak	Spacewatch	·	1.7 km	MPC · JPL
226375	2003 KY_{11}	—	May 26, 2003	Kitt Peak	Spacewatch	H	750 m	MPC · JPL
226376	2003 KM_{15}	—	May 26, 2003	Kitt Peak	Spacewatch	·	1.5 km	MPC · JPL
226377	2003 KC_{30}	—	May 25, 2003	Kitt Peak	Spacewatch	·	1.7 km	MPC · JPL
226378	2003 KO_{30}	—	May 26, 2003	Kitt Peak	Spacewatch	·	2.9 km	MPC · JPL
226379	2003 KP_{32}	—	May 27, 2003	Kitt Peak	Spacewatch	WIT	1.5 km	MPC · JPL
226380	2003 KE_{33}	—	May 27, 2003	Kitt Peak	Spacewatch	·	1.4 km	MPC · JPL
226381	2003 NT_{1}	—	July 2, 2003	Socorro	LINEAR	·	6.6 km	MPC · JPL
226382	2003 NZ_{3}	—	July 3, 2003	Kitt Peak	Spacewatch	·	2.9 km	MPC · JPL
226383	2003 NT_{8}	—	July 2, 2003	Anderson Mesa	LONEOS	T_{j} (2.98) ·	6.0 km	MPC · JPL
226384	2003 OK_{3}	—	July 22, 2003	Haleakala	NEAT	H	940 m	MPC · JPL
226385	2003 ON_{6}	—	July 23, 2003	Socorro	LINEAR	H	960 m	MPC · JPL
226386	2003 OX_{6}	—	July 23, 2003	Palomar	NEAT	·	3.3 km	MPC · JPL
226387	2003 OD_{20}	—	July 30, 2003	Campo Imperatore	CINEOS	·	3.4 km	MPC · JPL
226388	2003 OS_{20}	—	July 31, 2003	Reedy Creek	J. Broughton	·	5.7 km	MPC · JPL
226389	2003 OJ_{32}	—	July 22, 2003	Socorro	LINEAR	H	1.0 km	MPC · JPL
226390	2003 PU_{6}	—	August 1, 2003	Socorro	LINEAR	·	5.2 km	MPC · JPL
226391	2003 PN_{7}	—	August 2, 2003	Haleakala	NEAT	·	4.1 km	MPC · JPL
226392	2003 QL_{4}	—	August 18, 2003	Campo Imperatore	CINEOS	·	4.4 km	MPC · JPL
226393	2003 QV_{4}	—	August 20, 2003	Palomar	NEAT	EOS	3.3 km	MPC · JPL
226394	2003 QM_{6}	—	August 19, 2003	Campo Imperatore	CINEOS	·	6.0 km	MPC · JPL
226395	2003 QZ_{13}	—	August 19, 2003	Campo Imperatore	CINEOS	TEL	1.7 km	MPC · JPL
226396	2003 QK_{14}	—	August 20, 2003	Palomar	NEAT	·	2.8 km	MPC · JPL
226397	2003 QT_{14}	—	August 20, 2003	Palomar	NEAT	·	3.4 km	MPC · JPL
226398	2003 QH_{20}	—	August 22, 2003	Palomar	NEAT	·	5.8 km	MPC · JPL
226399	2003 QH_{21}	—	August 22, 2003	Palomar	NEAT	·	5.1 km	MPC · JPL
226400	2003 QX_{35}	—	August 22, 2003	Palomar	NEAT	EUP	5.1 km	MPC · JPL

== 226401–226500 ==
back to top

Designation			Discovery			Properties		Ref
Permanent	Provisional	Named after	Date	Site	Discoverer(s)	Category	Diam.	Ref
226401	2003 QV_{46}	—	August 24, 2003	Socorro	LINEAR	·	4.1 km	MPC · JPL
226402	2003 QD_{51}	—	August 22, 2003	Palomar	NEAT	·	6.4 km	MPC · JPL
226403	2003 QT_{58}	—	August 23, 2003	Palomar	NEAT	·	4.0 km	MPC · JPL
226404	2003 QV_{60}	—	August 23, 2003	Socorro	LINEAR	·	5.0 km	MPC · JPL
226405	2003 QK_{67}	—	August 23, 2003	Socorro	LINEAR	EOS	4.2 km	MPC · JPL
226406	2003 QA_{70}	—	August 27, 2003	Palomar	NEAT	·	7.7 km	MPC · JPL
226407	2003 QU_{77}	—	August 24, 2003	Socorro	LINEAR	·	4.8 km	MPC · JPL
226408	2003 QM_{81}	—	August 23, 2003	Cerro Tololo	M. W. Buie	EOS	3.0 km	MPC · JPL
226409	2003 QM_{85}	—	August 24, 2003	Cerro Tololo	M. W. Buie	HYG	4.6 km	MPC · JPL
226410	2003 QU_{92}	—	August 27, 2003	Palomar	NEAT	·	4.5 km	MPC · JPL
226411	2003 QE_{94}	—	August 28, 2003	Haleakala	NEAT	·	4.1 km	MPC · JPL
226412	2003 QY_{94}	—	August 29, 2003	Haleakala	NEAT	·	3.8 km	MPC · JPL
226413	2003 QF_{101}	—	August 28, 2003	Haleakala	NEAT	EOS	3.4 km	MPC · JPL
226414	2003 QE_{106}	—	August 30, 2003	Kitt Peak	Spacewatch	LIX	6.9 km	MPC · JPL
226415	2003 QE_{114}	—	August 23, 2003	Campo Imperatore	CINEOS	EOS	2.9 km	MPC · JPL
226416	2003 QG_{115}	—	August 27, 2003	Palomar	NEAT	·	6.0 km	MPC · JPL
226417	2003 RG_{3}	—	September 1, 2003	Socorro	LINEAR	·	4.0 km	MPC · JPL
226418	2003 RT_{4}	—	September 3, 2003	Haleakala	NEAT	·	4.8 km	MPC · JPL
226419	2003 RJ_{5}	—	September 2, 2003	Socorro	LINEAR	·	2.0 km	MPC · JPL
226420	2003 RF_{7}	—	September 4, 2003	Campo Imperatore	CINEOS	·	4.6 km	MPC · JPL
226421	2003 RU_{7}	—	September 4, 2003	Reedy Creek	J. Broughton	·	2.9 km	MPC · JPL
226422	2003 RE_{10}	—	September 2, 2003	Bergisch Gladbach	W. Bickel	·	3.8 km	MPC · JPL
226423	2003 RQ_{14}	—	September 15, 2003	Haleakala	NEAT	EOS	2.7 km	MPC · JPL
226424	2003 RG_{23}	—	September 13, 2003	Haleakala	NEAT	·	3.4 km	MPC · JPL
226425	2003 SC_{1}	—	September 16, 2003	Kitt Peak	Spacewatch	·	4.4 km	MPC · JPL
226426	2003 SJ_{10}	—	September 17, 2003	Kitt Peak	Spacewatch	·	4.2 km	MPC · JPL
226427	2003 SF_{19}	—	September 16, 2003	Kitt Peak	Spacewatch	·	2.7 km	MPC · JPL
226428	2003 SC_{22}	—	September 16, 2003	Kitt Peak	Spacewatch	EOS	3.1 km	MPC · JPL
226429	2003 SS_{22}	—	September 16, 2003	Kitt Peak	Spacewatch	·	4.2 km	MPC · JPL
226430	2003 SU_{24}	—	September 17, 2003	Haleakala	NEAT	AEG	4.6 km	MPC · JPL
226431	2003 SB_{25}	—	September 17, 2003	Kitt Peak	Spacewatch	EOS	2.5 km	MPC · JPL
226432	2003 SQ_{25}	—	September 17, 2003	Kitt Peak	Spacewatch	EOS	3.1 km	MPC · JPL
226433	2003 SH_{28}	—	September 18, 2003	Palomar	NEAT	·	2.6 km	MPC · JPL
226434	2003 SP_{29}	—	September 18, 2003	Palomar	NEAT	·	3.9 km	MPC · JPL
226435	2003 SY_{30}	—	September 18, 2003	Palomar	NEAT	·	5.1 km	MPC · JPL
226436	2003 SH_{34}	—	September 18, 2003	Kitt Peak	Spacewatch	THM	3.2 km	MPC · JPL
226437	2003 SF_{39}	—	September 16, 2003	Palomar	NEAT	·	3.9 km	MPC · JPL
226438	2003 SS_{40}	—	September 16, 2003	Palomar	NEAT	·	4.6 km	MPC · JPL
226439	2003 SP_{47}	—	September 18, 2003	Palomar	NEAT	·	3.1 km	MPC · JPL
226440	2003 SZ_{47}	—	September 18, 2003	Palomar	NEAT	·	5.0 km	MPC · JPL
226441	2003 SD_{48}	—	September 18, 2003	Palomar	NEAT	EOS	4.1 km	MPC · JPL
226442	2003 SE_{49}	—	September 18, 2003	Palomar	NEAT	·	3.3 km	MPC · JPL
226443	2003 SA_{53}	—	September 19, 2003	Palomar	NEAT	·	4.8 km	MPC · JPL
226444	2003 SN_{65}	—	September 18, 2003	Anderson Mesa	LONEOS	TIR	2.8 km	MPC · JPL
226445	2003 SP_{66}	—	September 18, 2003	Campo Imperatore	CINEOS	·	4.2 km	MPC · JPL
226446	2003 SB_{71}	—	September 18, 2003	Kitt Peak	Spacewatch	·	6.4 km	MPC · JPL
226447	2003 SM_{74}	—	September 18, 2003	Kitt Peak	Spacewatch	·	2.9 km	MPC · JPL
226448	2003 SN_{74}	—	September 18, 2003	Kitt Peak	Spacewatch	HYG	4.2 km	MPC · JPL
226449	2003 SE_{79}	—	September 19, 2003	Kitt Peak	Spacewatch	·	4.1 km	MPC · JPL
226450	2003 SG_{97}	—	September 19, 2003	Palomar	NEAT	VER	5.3 km	MPC · JPL
226451	2003 SU_{98}	—	September 19, 2003	Haleakala	NEAT	·	4.3 km	MPC · JPL
226452	2003 SV_{98}	—	September 19, 2003	Haleakala	NEAT	·	6.1 km	MPC · JPL
226453	2003 SG_{101}	—	September 20, 2003	Palomar	NEAT	·	4.1 km	MPC · JPL
226454	2003 SC_{105}	—	September 20, 2003	Palomar	NEAT	·	3.8 km	MPC · JPL
226455	2003 SK_{105}	—	September 20, 2003	Haleakala	NEAT	·	4.4 km	MPC · JPL
226456	2003 SH_{107}	—	September 20, 2003	Palomar	NEAT	·	4.2 km	MPC · JPL
226457	2003 SL_{111}	—	September 19, 2003	Palomar	NEAT	·	4.0 km	MPC · JPL
226458	2003 SD_{124}	—	September 18, 2003	Palomar	NEAT	·	3.8 km	MPC · JPL
226459	2003 SG_{139}	—	September 20, 2003	Socorro	LINEAR	·	5.2 km	MPC · JPL
226460	2003 SZ_{140}	—	September 19, 2003	Palomar	NEAT	·	4.9 km	MPC · JPL
226461	2003 SH_{142}	—	September 20, 2003	Palomar	NEAT	·	5.7 km	MPC · JPL
226462	2003 SP_{143}	—	September 20, 2003	Palomar	NEAT	·	4.7 km	MPC · JPL
226463	2003 SD_{144}	—	September 21, 2003	Haleakala	NEAT	·	5.3 km	MPC · JPL
226464	2003 SW_{144}	—	September 19, 2003	Haleakala	NEAT	·	5.3 km	MPC · JPL
226465	2003 SS_{148}	—	September 16, 2003	Kitt Peak	Spacewatch	·	5.2 km	MPC · JPL
226466	2003 ST_{151}	—	September 18, 2003	Palomar	NEAT	·	3.0 km	MPC · JPL
226467	2003 SE_{157}	—	September 19, 2003	Anderson Mesa	LONEOS	EOS	3.1 km	MPC · JPL
226468	2003 SK_{160}	—	September 22, 2003	Palomar	NEAT	HYG	5.1 km	MPC · JPL
226469	2003 SP_{167}	—	September 22, 2003	Kitt Peak	Spacewatch	·	2.6 km	MPC · JPL
226470	2003 SV_{168}	—	September 23, 2003	Haleakala	NEAT	·	5.0 km	MPC · JPL
226471	2003 SK_{173}	—	September 18, 2003	Socorro	LINEAR	HYG	5.1 km	MPC · JPL
226472	2003 SD_{174}	—	September 18, 2003	Palomar	NEAT	·	4.1 km	MPC · JPL
226473	2003 SA_{175}	—	September 18, 2003	Kitt Peak	Spacewatch	THM	3.8 km	MPC · JPL
226474	2003 SS_{175}	—	September 18, 2003	Palomar	NEAT	·	3.5 km	MPC · JPL
226475	2003 SJ_{179}	—	September 19, 2003	Palomar	NEAT	·	3.8 km	MPC · JPL
226476	2003 SL_{179}	—	September 19, 2003	Palomar	NEAT	·	3.4 km	MPC · JPL
226477	2003 SF_{180}	—	September 19, 2003	Kitt Peak	Spacewatch	EOS	4.6 km	MPC · JPL
226478	2003 SQ_{184}	—	September 21, 2003	Kitt Peak	Spacewatch	·	4.3 km	MPC · JPL
226479	2003 SV_{185}	—	September 22, 2003	Anderson Mesa	LONEOS	·	5.5 km	MPC · JPL
226480	2003 SB_{188}	—	September 22, 2003	Socorro	LINEAR	·	5.8 km	MPC · JPL
226481	2003 SQ_{193}	—	September 20, 2003	Haleakala	NEAT	·	3.3 km	MPC · JPL
226482	2003 ST_{197}	—	September 21, 2003	Anderson Mesa	LONEOS	THM	3.2 km	MPC · JPL
226483	2003 SX_{214}	—	September 27, 2003	Socorro	LINEAR	·	5.8 km	MPC · JPL
226484	2003 SV_{237}	—	September 26, 2003	Socorro	LINEAR	HYG	4.8 km	MPC · JPL
226485	2003 SO_{238}	—	September 27, 2003	Socorro	LINEAR	·	5.4 km	MPC · JPL
226486	2003 SV_{241}	—	September 27, 2003	Socorro	LINEAR	HYG	3.7 km	MPC · JPL
226487	2003 SK_{248}	—	September 26, 2003	Socorro	LINEAR	·	3.8 km	MPC · JPL
226488	2003 SE_{249}	—	September 26, 2003	Socorro	LINEAR	·	5.1 km	MPC · JPL
226489	2003 ST_{262}	—	September 28, 2003	Socorro	LINEAR	·	6.9 km	MPC · JPL
226490	2003 SX_{272}	—	September 27, 2003	Socorro	LINEAR	·	4.3 km	MPC · JPL
226491	2003 SR_{274}	—	September 28, 2003	Kitt Peak	Spacewatch	HYG	4.0 km	MPC · JPL
226492	2003 SD_{282}	—	September 19, 2003	Anderson Mesa	LONEOS	·	6.3 km	MPC · JPL
226493	2003 SA_{284}	—	September 20, 2003	Socorro	LINEAR	·	5.3 km	MPC · JPL
226494	2003 SN_{284}	—	September 20, 2003	Socorro	LINEAR	EOS	3.5 km	MPC · JPL
226495	2003 SJ_{286}	—	September 21, 2003	Palomar	NEAT	·	3.4 km	MPC · JPL
226496	2003 SU_{291}	—	September 30, 2003	Socorro	LINEAR	·	5.1 km	MPC · JPL
226497	2003 SN_{292}	—	September 25, 2003	Palomar	NEAT	·	6.8 km	MPC · JPL
226498	2003 SL_{293}	—	September 27, 2003	Socorro	LINEAR	·	4.1 km	MPC · JPL
226499	2003 SP_{296}	—	September 29, 2003	Anderson Mesa	LONEOS	·	5.5 km	MPC · JPL
226500	2003 SH_{309}	—	September 27, 2003	Socorro	LINEAR	HYG	4.9 km	MPC · JPL

== 226501–226600 ==
back to top

Designation			Discovery			Properties		Ref
Permanent	Provisional	Named after	Date	Site	Discoverer(s)	Category	Diam.	Ref
226501	2003 SN_{315}	—	September 28, 2003	Haleakala	NEAT	·	3.8 km	MPC · JPL
226502	2003 SY_{318}	—	September 19, 2003	Anderson Mesa	LONEOS	·	4.3 km	MPC · JPL
226503	2003 SB_{319}	—	September 20, 2003	Socorro	LINEAR	·	3.6 km	MPC · JPL
226504	2003 SX_{320}	—	September 18, 2003	Kitt Peak	Spacewatch	·	940 m	MPC · JPL
226505	2003 SC_{322}	—	September 27, 2003	Desert Eagle	W. K. Y. Yeung	·	4.5 km	MPC · JPL
226506	2003 SB_{329}	—	September 21, 2003	Kitt Peak	Spacewatch	LUT	5.5 km	MPC · JPL
226507	2003 TT	—	October 3, 2003	Kingsnake	J. V. McClusky	·	5.3 km	MPC · JPL
226508	2003 TJ_{10}	—	October 15, 2003	Črni Vrh	Skvarč, J.	TIR	3.3 km	MPC · JPL
226509	2003 TB_{16}	—	October 15, 2003	Anderson Mesa	LONEOS	·	4.8 km	MPC · JPL
226510	2003 TA_{42}	—	October 2, 2003	Kitt Peak	Spacewatch	·	4.1 km	MPC · JPL
226511	2003 UU_{1}	—	October 16, 2003	Kitt Peak	Spacewatch	·	5.6 km	MPC · JPL
226512	2003 UC_{25}	—	October 20, 2003	Kingsnake	J. V. McClusky	·	5.5 km	MPC · JPL
226513	2003 UP_{27}	—	October 16, 2003	Goodricke-Pigott	R. A. Tucker	·	6.4 km	MPC · JPL
226514	2003 UX_{34}	—	October 26, 2003	Kitt Peak	Spacewatch	APO · PHA · moon	330 m	MPC · JPL
226515	2003 UO_{45}	—	October 18, 2003	Junk Bond	Junk Bond	THM	3.1 km	MPC · JPL
226516	2003 UR_{46}	—	October 18, 2003	Kitt Peak	Spacewatch	·	3.1 km	MPC · JPL
226517	2003 UA_{47}	—	October 21, 2003	Goodricke-Pigott	R. A. Tucker	VER	6.1 km	MPC · JPL
226518	2003 UC_{60}	—	October 17, 2003	Anderson Mesa	LONEOS	TIR	4.7 km	MPC · JPL
226519	2003 UW_{61}	—	October 16, 2003	Anderson Mesa	LONEOS	·	5.7 km	MPC · JPL
226520	2003 UU_{62}	—	October 16, 2003	Palomar	NEAT	·	8.1 km	MPC · JPL
226521	2003 UW_{66}	—	October 18, 2003	Palomar	NEAT	·	3.8 km	MPC · JPL
226522	2003 UT_{79}	—	October 19, 2003	Kitt Peak	Spacewatch	HYG	4.3 km	MPC · JPL
226523	2003 UO_{93}	—	October 17, 2003	Kitt Peak	Spacewatch	·	3.5 km	MPC · JPL
226524	2003 UQ_{96}	—	October 19, 2003	Kitt Peak	Spacewatch	EUP	5.8 km	MPC · JPL
226525	2003 UF_{98}	—	October 19, 2003	Anderson Mesa	LONEOS	·	5.2 km	MPC · JPL
226526	2003 UK_{105}	—	October 18, 2003	Kitt Peak	Spacewatch	·	3.5 km	MPC · JPL
226527	2003 UZ_{124}	—	October 20, 2003	Socorro	LINEAR	KOR	2.3 km	MPC · JPL
226528	2003 UJ_{125}	—	October 20, 2003	Socorro	LINEAR	LIX	6.0 km	MPC · JPL
226529	2003 UV_{139}	—	October 16, 2003	Anderson Mesa	LONEOS	·	4.7 km	MPC · JPL
226530	2003 UY_{141}	—	October 18, 2003	Anderson Mesa	LONEOS	·	4.1 km	MPC · JPL
226531	2003 UO_{142}	—	October 18, 2003	Anderson Mesa	LONEOS	·	5.8 km	MPC · JPL
226532	2003 UC_{155}	—	October 20, 2003	Socorro	LINEAR	LIX	5.1 km	MPC · JPL
226533	2003 UE_{161}	—	October 21, 2003	Kitt Peak	Spacewatch	VER	5.4 km	MPC · JPL
226534	2003 UO_{161}	—	October 21, 2003	Palomar	NEAT	·	2.9 km	MPC · JPL
226535	2003 UG_{180}	—	October 21, 2003	Socorro	LINEAR	·	7.5 km	MPC · JPL
226536	2003 UK_{180}	—	October 21, 2003	Socorro	LINEAR	·	4.6 km	MPC · JPL
226537	2003 UF_{183}	—	October 21, 2003	Palomar	NEAT	·	3.9 km	MPC · JPL
226538	2003 UZ_{195}	—	October 20, 2003	Kitt Peak	Spacewatch	HYG	4.4 km	MPC · JPL
226539	2003 UW_{216}	—	October 21, 2003	Socorro	LINEAR	·	3.8 km	MPC · JPL
226540	2003 UK_{218}	—	October 21, 2003	Socorro	LINEAR	·	5.0 km	MPC · JPL
226541	2003 UJ_{221}	—	October 22, 2003	Kitt Peak	Spacewatch	·	4.3 km	MPC · JPL
226542	2003 UM_{222}	—	October 22, 2003	Socorro	LINEAR	·	3.2 km	MPC · JPL
226543	2003 UX_{235}	—	October 22, 2003	Kitt Peak	Spacewatch	·	3.9 km	MPC · JPL
226544	2003 UZ_{245}	—	October 24, 2003	Socorro	LINEAR	CYB	4.2 km	MPC · JPL
226545	2003 UL_{253}	—	October 21, 2003	Anderson Mesa	LONEOS	·	4.9 km	MPC · JPL
226546	2003 UK_{278}	—	October 25, 2003	Socorro	LINEAR	LUT	5.7 km	MPC · JPL
226547	2003 UY_{279}	—	October 27, 2003	Socorro	LINEAR	LUT	5.4 km	MPC · JPL
226548	2003 UU_{282}	—	October 29, 2003	Anderson Mesa	LONEOS	·	5.3 km	MPC · JPL
226549	2003 UA_{304}	—	October 17, 2003	Kitt Peak	Spacewatch	·	4.9 km	MPC · JPL
226550	2003 UW_{307}	—	October 18, 2003	Kitt Peak	Spacewatch	THM	2.9 km	MPC · JPL
226551	2003 UB_{351}	—	October 19, 2003	Apache Point	SDSS	EOS	3.9 km	MPC · JPL
226552	2003 WN_{6}	—	November 16, 2003	Kitt Peak	Spacewatch	·	2.5 km	MPC · JPL
226553	2003 WB_{16}	—	November 16, 2003	Kitt Peak	Spacewatch	·	2.9 km	MPC · JPL
226554	2003 WR_{21}	—	November 20, 2003	Catalina	CSS	APO · PHA	480 m	MPC · JPL
226555	2003 WT_{27}	—	November 16, 2003	Kitt Peak	Spacewatch	·	4.7 km	MPC · JPL
226556	2003 WS_{33}	—	November 18, 2003	Palomar	NEAT	LIX	5.6 km	MPC · JPL
226557	2003 WY_{36}	—	November 19, 2003	Socorro	LINEAR	TIR	2.3 km	MPC · JPL
226558	2003 WD_{37}	—	November 19, 2003	Socorro	LINEAR	·	2.8 km	MPC · JPL
226559	2003 WR_{38}	—	November 19, 2003	Socorro	LINEAR	URS	5.9 km	MPC · JPL
226560	2003 WY_{51}	—	November 19, 2003	Palomar	NEAT	·	5.7 km	MPC · JPL
226561	2003 WJ_{52}	—	November 20, 2003	Kitt Peak	Spacewatch	·	6.0 km	MPC · JPL
226562	2003 WD_{59}	—	November 18, 2003	Kitt Peak	Spacewatch	·	4.3 km	MPC · JPL
226563	2003 WT_{68}	—	November 19, 2003	Kitt Peak	Spacewatch	·	6.6 km	MPC · JPL
226564	2003 WP_{70}	—	November 20, 2003	Socorro	LINEAR	T_{j} (2.99)	5.8 km	MPC · JPL
226565	2003 WR_{71}	—	November 20, 2003	Socorro	LINEAR	EOS	2.7 km	MPC · JPL
226566	2003 WF_{85}	—	November 20, 2003	Kitt Peak	Spacewatch	·	5.3 km	MPC · JPL
226567	2003 WG_{107}	—	November 23, 2003	Catalina	CSS	·	4.0 km	MPC · JPL
226568	2003 WH_{189}	—	November 20, 2003	Palomar	NEAT	·	6.1 km	MPC · JPL
226569	2003 WW_{189}	—	November 24, 2003	Socorro	LINEAR	·	5.1 km	MPC · JPL
226570	2003 WL_{193}	—	November 16, 2003	Apache Point	SDSS	·	3.6 km	MPC · JPL
226571	2003 XX_{8}	—	December 4, 2003	Socorro	LINEAR	·	5.0 km	MPC · JPL
226572	2003 XA_{11}	—	December 12, 2003	Palomar	NEAT	LUT	7.3 km	MPC · JPL
226573	2003 XO_{13}	—	December 14, 2003	Palomar	NEAT	ULA · CYB	7.2 km	MPC · JPL
226574	2003 YJ_{2}	—	December 18, 2003	Socorro	LINEAR	H	910 m	MPC · JPL
226575	2003 YL_{20}	—	December 17, 2003	Kitt Peak	Spacewatch	·	1.1 km	MPC · JPL
226576	2003 YT_{34}	—	December 18, 2003	Socorro	LINEAR	·	4.6 km	MPC · JPL
226577	2003 YA_{42}	—	December 19, 2003	Kitt Peak	Spacewatch	·	4.4 km	MPC · JPL
226578	2003 YC_{44}	—	December 19, 2003	Kitt Peak	Spacewatch	·	4.0 km	MPC · JPL
226579	2003 YL_{68}	—	December 19, 2003	Socorro	LINEAR	·	1.3 km	MPC · JPL
226580	2003 YQ_{93}	—	December 21, 2003	Kitt Peak	Spacewatch	·	1.5 km	MPC · JPL
226581	2003 YK_{140}	—	December 28, 2003	Socorro	LINEAR	·	7.2 km	MPC · JPL
226582	2003 YK_{153}	—	December 29, 2003	Socorro	LINEAR	H	1.4 km	MPC · JPL
226583	2003 YR_{163}	—	December 17, 2003	Kitt Peak	Spacewatch	·	5.3 km	MPC · JPL
226584	2004 AN_{5}	—	January 13, 2004	Anderson Mesa	LONEOS	·	1.1 km	MPC · JPL
226585	2004 AP_{12}	—	January 13, 2004	Kitt Peak	Spacewatch	·	670 m	MPC · JPL
226586	2004 BD_{15}	—	January 16, 2004	Kitt Peak	Spacewatch	·	740 m	MPC · JPL
226587	2004 BY_{19}	—	January 18, 2004	Kitt Peak	Spacewatch	·	3.9 km	MPC · JPL
226588	2004 BJ_{23}	—	January 18, 2004	Palomar	NEAT	·	1.2 km	MPC · JPL
226589	2004 BY_{28}	—	January 18, 2004	Palomar	NEAT	·	860 m	MPC · JPL
226590	2004 BT_{47}	—	January 21, 2004	Socorro	LINEAR	·	4.3 km	MPC · JPL
226591	2004 BY_{77}	—	January 22, 2004	Socorro	LINEAR	·	1.8 km	MPC · JPL
226592	2004 BK_{102}	—	January 29, 2004	Kitt Peak	Spacewatch	·	1.3 km	MPC · JPL
226593	2004 CB_{23}	—	February 12, 2004	Kitt Peak	Spacewatch	LIX	6.4 km	MPC · JPL
226594	2004 CD_{23}	—	February 12, 2004	Kitt Peak	Spacewatch	·	1.8 km	MPC · JPL
226595	2004 CQ_{26}	—	February 11, 2004	Catalina	CSS	·	1.3 km	MPC · JPL
226596	2004 CY_{31}	—	February 12, 2004	Kitt Peak	Spacewatch	·	950 m	MPC · JPL
226597	2004 CF_{37}	—	February 12, 2004	Palomar	NEAT	·	1.1 km	MPC · JPL
226598	2004 CC_{43}	—	February 11, 2004	Palomar	NEAT	·	1.0 km	MPC · JPL
226599	2004 CO_{56}	—	February 14, 2004	Haleakala	NEAT	(2076)	1.4 km	MPC · JPL
226600	2004 CQ_{64}	—	February 13, 2004	Palomar	NEAT	·	1.5 km	MPC · JPL

== 226601–226700 ==
back to top

Designation			Discovery			Properties		Ref
Permanent	Provisional	Named after	Date	Site	Discoverer(s)	Category	Diam.	Ref
226601	2004 CV_{79}	—	February 11, 2004	Palomar	NEAT	·	1.2 km	MPC · JPL
226602	2004 CH_{84}	—	February 13, 2004	Kitt Peak	Spacewatch	3:2	6.8 km	MPC · JPL
226603	2004 CC_{85}	—	February 13, 2004	Kitt Peak	Spacewatch	·	1.2 km	MPC · JPL
226604	2004 CC_{86}	—	February 14, 2004	Kitt Peak	Spacewatch	·	1.1 km	MPC · JPL
226605	2004 CD_{95}	—	February 13, 2004	Palomar	NEAT	·	1.9 km	MPC · JPL
226606	2004 CS_{115}	—	February 10, 2004	Palomar	NEAT	·	1.2 km	MPC · JPL
226607	2004 DC_{5}	—	February 16, 2004	Kitt Peak	Spacewatch	NYS	1.5 km	MPC · JPL
226608	2004 DQ_{21}	—	February 17, 2004	Catalina	CSS	·	1.4 km	MPC · JPL
226609	2004 DB_{22}	—	February 17, 2004	Catalina	CSS	·	970 m	MPC · JPL
226610	2004 DO_{22}	—	February 18, 2004	Socorro	LINEAR	·	1.1 km	MPC · JPL
226611	2004 DB_{24}	—	February 19, 2004	Socorro	LINEAR	·	1.4 km	MPC · JPL
226612	2004 DN_{28}	—	February 17, 2004	Kitt Peak	Spacewatch	3:2 · SHU	9.1 km	MPC · JPL
226613	2004 DZ_{29}	—	February 17, 2004	Socorro	LINEAR	·	1.2 km	MPC · JPL
226614	2004 DG_{40}	—	February 17, 2004	Kitt Peak	Spacewatch	·	1.1 km	MPC · JPL
226615	2004 DJ_{43}	—	February 23, 2004	Socorro	LINEAR	·	1.1 km	MPC · JPL
226616	2004 DL_{43}	—	February 23, 2004	Socorro	LINEAR	·	1.2 km	MPC · JPL
226617	2004 DV_{46}	—	February 19, 2004	Socorro	LINEAR	·	1.5 km	MPC · JPL
226618	2004 DE_{57}	—	February 22, 2004	Kitt Peak	Spacewatch	·	1.3 km	MPC · JPL
226619	2004 DX_{78}	—	February 17, 2004	Socorro	LINEAR	·	1.0 km	MPC · JPL
226620	2004 EW_{5}	—	March 11, 2004	Palomar	NEAT	NYS	2.2 km	MPC · JPL
226621	2004 EK_{6}	—	March 12, 2004	Palomar	NEAT	·	1.1 km	MPC · JPL
226622	2004 EJ_{7}	—	March 12, 2004	Palomar	NEAT	V	1 km	MPC · JPL
226623	2004 EY_{7}	—	March 13, 2004	Palomar	NEAT	·	2.4 km	MPC · JPL
226624	2004 EP_{30}	—	March 15, 2004	Kitt Peak	Spacewatch	·	1.2 km	MPC · JPL
226625	2004 EX_{36}	—	March 13, 2004	Palomar	NEAT	·	1.0 km	MPC · JPL
226626	2004 EE_{40}	—	March 15, 2004	Socorro	LINEAR	·	1.5 km	MPC · JPL
226627	2004 EE_{42}	—	March 15, 2004	Catalina	CSS	·	1.6 km	MPC · JPL
226628	2004 ER_{53}	—	March 15, 2004	Socorro	LINEAR	·	940 m	MPC · JPL
226629	2004 EX_{77}	—	March 15, 2004	Catalina	CSS	·	740 m	MPC · JPL
226630	2004 EU_{91}	—	March 15, 2004	Kitt Peak	Spacewatch	·	870 m	MPC · JPL
226631	2004 FH_{2}	—	March 17, 2004	Goodricke-Pigott	R. A. Tucker	·	1.2 km	MPC · JPL
226632	2004 FP_{3}	—	March 18, 2004	Socorro	LINEAR	·	1.0 km	MPC · JPL
226633	2004 FN_{11}	—	March 16, 2004	Catalina	CSS	·	1.1 km	MPC · JPL
226634	2004 FG_{13}	—	March 16, 2004	Catalina	CSS	·	2.5 km	MPC · JPL
226635	2004 FF_{19}	—	March 16, 2004	Catalina	CSS	·	1.1 km	MPC · JPL
226636	2004 FO_{21}	—	March 16, 2004	Kitt Peak	Spacewatch	·	1.0 km	MPC · JPL
226637	2004 FU_{21}	—	March 16, 2004	Kitt Peak	Spacewatch	·	1.1 km	MPC · JPL
226638	2004 FN_{35}	—	March 16, 2004	Socorro	LINEAR	·	1.5 km	MPC · JPL
226639	2004 FG_{36}	—	March 16, 2004	Socorro	LINEAR	·	1.0 km	MPC · JPL
226640	2004 FT_{49}	—	March 18, 2004	Socorro	LINEAR	·	1.0 km	MPC · JPL
226641	2004 FT_{64}	—	March 19, 2004	Socorro	LINEAR	·	1.0 km	MPC · JPL
226642	2004 FZ_{64}	—	March 19, 2004	Socorro	LINEAR	V	1.1 km	MPC · JPL
226643	2004 FS_{66}	—	March 20, 2004	Socorro	LINEAR	·	1.7 km	MPC · JPL
226644	2004 FO_{69}	—	March 16, 2004	Kitt Peak	Spacewatch	·	1.6 km	MPC · JPL
226645	2004 FP_{78}	—	March 19, 2004	Kitt Peak	Spacewatch	·	1.2 km	MPC · JPL
226646	2004 FE_{85}	—	March 18, 2004	Kitt Peak	Spacewatch	·	1.6 km	MPC · JPL
226647	2004 FP_{92}	—	March 18, 2004	Socorro	LINEAR	·	690 m	MPC · JPL
226648	2004 FS_{106}	—	March 20, 2004	Socorro	LINEAR	·	1.9 km	MPC · JPL
226649	2004 FX_{106}	—	March 20, 2004	Socorro	LINEAR	·	880 m	MPC · JPL
226650	2004 FQ_{107}	—	March 20, 2004	Socorro	LINEAR	·	1.1 km	MPC · JPL
226651	2004 FU_{107}	—	March 22, 2004	Socorro	LINEAR	·	1.7 km	MPC · JPL
226652	2004 FT_{110}	—	March 25, 2004	Anderson Mesa	LONEOS	ERI	3.0 km	MPC · JPL
226653	2004 FX_{127}	—	March 27, 2004	Catalina	CSS	·	2.2 km	MPC · JPL
226654	2004 FV_{134}	—	March 26, 2004	Socorro	LINEAR	ERI	2.2 km	MPC · JPL
226655	2004 FX_{135}	—	March 27, 2004	Socorro	LINEAR	·	930 m	MPC · JPL
226656	2004 FV_{139}	—	March 26, 2004	Anderson Mesa	LONEOS	·	2.0 km	MPC · JPL
226657	2004 FZ_{140}	—	March 27, 2004	Socorro	LINEAR	·	1.1 km	MPC · JPL
226658	2004 FZ_{141}	—	March 27, 2004	Socorro	LINEAR	·	1.0 km	MPC · JPL
226659	2004 FJ_{162}	—	March 18, 2004	Kitt Peak	Spacewatch	V	740 m	MPC · JPL
226660	2004 GY_{1}	—	April 11, 2004	Palomar	NEAT	·	1.6 km	MPC · JPL
226661	2004 GC_{13}	—	April 12, 2004	Catalina	CSS	·	3.8 km	MPC · JPL
226662	2004 GR_{13}	—	April 13, 2004	Palomar	NEAT	V	920 m	MPC · JPL
226663	2004 GV_{13}	—	April 13, 2004	Palomar	NEAT	·	2.0 km	MPC · JPL
226664	2004 GK_{17}	—	April 11, 2004	Catalina	CSS	·	1.2 km	MPC · JPL
226665	2004 GD_{22}	—	April 12, 2004	Palomar	NEAT	NYS	1.4 km	MPC · JPL
226666	2004 GN_{23}	—	April 12, 2004	Palomar	NEAT	PHO	3.5 km	MPC · JPL
226667	2004 GK_{36}	—	April 13, 2004	Palomar	NEAT	·	2.9 km	MPC · JPL
226668	2004 GS_{44}	—	April 12, 2004	Kitt Peak	Spacewatch	·	1.5 km	MPC · JPL
226669	2004 GJ_{46}	—	April 12, 2004	Kitt Peak	Spacewatch	·	1.2 km	MPC · JPL
226670	2004 GY_{66}	—	April 13, 2004	Kitt Peak	Spacewatch	·	870 m	MPC · JPL
226671	2004 GF_{80}	—	April 12, 2004	Kitt Peak	Spacewatch	·	1 km	MPC · JPL
226672 Kučinskas	2004 HH_{5}	Kučinskas	April 16, 2004	Moletai	K. Černis, Zdanavicius, J.	·	2.5 km	MPC · JPL
226673	2004 HR_{5}	—	April 17, 2004	Socorro	LINEAR	·	920 m	MPC · JPL
226674	2004 HV_{14}	—	April 16, 2004	Kitt Peak	Spacewatch	·	980 m	MPC · JPL
226675	2004 HE_{18}	—	April 17, 2004	Socorro	LINEAR	·	1.7 km	MPC · JPL
226676	2004 HQ_{28}	—	April 20, 2004	Socorro	LINEAR	·	1.4 km	MPC · JPL
226677	2004 HX_{30}	—	April 20, 2004	Socorro	LINEAR	·	1.2 km	MPC · JPL
226678	2004 HO_{34}	—	April 17, 2004	Socorro	LINEAR	V	930 m	MPC · JPL
226679	2004 HP_{35}	—	April 20, 2004	Socorro	LINEAR	NYS	1.4 km	MPC · JPL
226680	2004 HU_{35}	—	April 20, 2004	Socorro	LINEAR	PHO	1.7 km	MPC · JPL
226681	2004 HJ_{43}	—	April 20, 2004	Siding Spring	SSS	·	1.2 km	MPC · JPL
226682	2004 HP_{43}	—	April 21, 2004	Kitt Peak	Spacewatch	·	930 m	MPC · JPL
226683	2004 HC_{51}	—	April 23, 2004	Siding Spring	SSS	·	1.3 km	MPC · JPL
226684	2004 HF_{52}	—	April 24, 2004	Kitt Peak	Spacewatch	·	1.6 km	MPC · JPL
226685	2004 HT_{54}	—	April 21, 2004	Socorro	LINEAR	NYS	1.4 km	MPC · JPL
226686	2004 HZ_{57}	—	April 21, 2004	Kitt Peak	Spacewatch	·	1.7 km	MPC · JPL
226687	2004 JG_{14}	—	May 9, 2004	Palomar	NEAT	·	1.2 km	MPC · JPL
226688	2004 JF_{15}	—	May 10, 2004	Palomar	NEAT	NYS	1.6 km	MPC · JPL
226689	2004 JH_{19}	—	May 13, 2004	Palomar	NEAT	V	950 m	MPC · JPL
226690	2004 JH_{20}	—	May 14, 2004	Socorro	LINEAR	·	1.6 km	MPC · JPL
226691	2004 JA_{22}	—	May 9, 2004	Kitt Peak	Spacewatch	L4	13 km	MPC · JPL
226692	2004 JO_{25}	—	May 15, 2004	Socorro	LINEAR	NYS	1.7 km	MPC · JPL
226693	2004 JX_{28}	—	May 15, 2004	Socorro	LINEAR	·	1.5 km	MPC · JPL
226694	2004 JZ_{28}	—	May 15, 2004	Socorro	LINEAR	·	1.5 km	MPC · JPL
226695	2004 JR_{29}	—	May 15, 2004	Socorro	LINEAR	·	1.3 km	MPC · JPL
226696	2004 JS_{35}	—	May 15, 2004	Siding Spring	SSS	·	1.8 km	MPC · JPL
226697	2004 JR_{43}	—	May 10, 2004	Catalina	CSS	·	1.7 km	MPC · JPL
226698	2004 LS_{11}	—	June 12, 2004	Siding Spring	SSS	·	1.7 km	MPC · JPL
226699	2004 LO_{17}	—	June 14, 2004	Socorro	LINEAR	JUN	1.9 km	MPC · JPL
226700	2004 LP_{17}	—	June 14, 2004	Socorro	LINEAR	·	2.2 km	MPC · JPL

== 226701–226800 ==
back to top

Designation			Discovery			Properties		Ref
Permanent	Provisional	Named after	Date	Site	Discoverer(s)	Category	Diam.	Ref
226701	2004 NP_{3}	—	July 12, 2004	Reedy Creek	J. Broughton	·	1.5 km	MPC · JPL
226702	2004 NY_{6}	—	July 11, 2004	Socorro	LINEAR	·	3.9 km	MPC · JPL
226703	2004 NJ_{9}	—	July 9, 2004	Socorro	LINEAR	·	3.5 km	MPC · JPL
226704	2004 NL_{17}	—	July 11, 2004	Socorro	LINEAR	·	3.1 km	MPC · JPL
226705	2004 NF_{19}	—	July 14, 2004	Socorro	LINEAR	·	1.9 km	MPC · JPL
226706	2004 NK_{24}	—	July 14, 2004	Socorro	LINEAR	·	2.9 km	MPC · JPL
226707	2004 OO_{2}	—	July 16, 2004	Socorro	LINEAR	·	1.3 km	MPC · JPL
226708	2004 OH_{7}	—	July 16, 2004	Socorro	LINEAR	·	3.7 km	MPC · JPL
226709	2004 OR_{7}	—	July 16, 2004	Socorro	LINEAR	·	2.0 km	MPC · JPL
226710	2004 OM_{11}	—	July 25, 2004	Anderson Mesa	LONEOS	EUN	2.6 km	MPC · JPL
226711	2004 OM_{15}	—	July 27, 2004	Siding Spring	SSS	·	2.0 km	MPC · JPL
226712	2004 PG_{1}	—	August 6, 2004	Reedy Creek	J. Broughton	·	1.9 km	MPC · JPL
226713	2004 PS_{4}	—	August 5, 2004	Palomar	NEAT	·	2.1 km	MPC · JPL
226714	2004 PV_{13}	—	August 7, 2004	Palomar	NEAT	·	2.2 km	MPC · JPL
226715	2004 PW_{15}	—	August 7, 2004	Palomar	NEAT	·	2.6 km	MPC · JPL
226716	2004 PL_{19}	—	August 8, 2004	Anderson Mesa	LONEOS	·	2.8 km	MPC · JPL
226717	2004 PK_{22}	—	August 8, 2004	Socorro	LINEAR	·	2.8 km	MPC · JPL
226718	2004 PZ_{25}	—	August 8, 2004	Socorro	LINEAR	·	2.9 km	MPC · JPL
226719	2004 PF_{34}	—	August 8, 2004	Anderson Mesa	LONEOS	EUN	1.6 km	MPC · JPL
226720	2004 PU_{36}	—	August 9, 2004	Socorro	LINEAR	·	2.2 km	MPC · JPL
226721	2004 PA_{40}	—	August 9, 2004	Anderson Mesa	LONEOS	AGN	3.3 km	MPC · JPL
226722	2004 PO_{49}	—	August 8, 2004	Socorro	LINEAR	MIS	3.7 km	MPC · JPL
226723	2004 PL_{55}	—	August 8, 2004	Palomar	NEAT	NEM	3.1 km	MPC · JPL
226724	2004 PB_{62}	—	August 9, 2004	Siding Spring	SSS	·	2.8 km	MPC · JPL
226725	2004 PP_{64}	—	August 10, 2004	Socorro	LINEAR	·	4.0 km	MPC · JPL
226726	2004 PE_{68}	—	August 6, 2004	Palomar	NEAT	·	2.9 km	MPC · JPL
226727	2004 PL_{89}	—	August 9, 2004	Socorro	LINEAR	ADE	4.5 km	MPC · JPL
226728	2004 PF_{92}	—	August 12, 2004	Palomar	NEAT	MAR	1.6 km	MPC · JPL
226729	2004 PJ_{92}	—	August 12, 2004	Palomar	NEAT	·	2.1 km	MPC · JPL
226730	2004 PB_{93}	—	August 11, 2004	Reedy Creek	J. Broughton	·	3.9 km	MPC · JPL
226731	2004 PP_{98}	—	August 8, 2004	Socorro	LINEAR	·	3.0 km	MPC · JPL
226732	2004 PU_{98}	—	August 8, 2004	Socorro	LINEAR	·	2.7 km	MPC · JPL
226733	2004 PC_{102}	—	August 11, 2004	Siding Spring	SSS	·	2.2 km	MPC · JPL
226734	2004 PJ_{105}	—	August 6, 2004	Palomar	NEAT	·	4.2 km	MPC · JPL
226735	2004 QP_{9}	—	August 21, 2004	Siding Spring	SSS	·	3.2 km	MPC · JPL
226736	2004 QX_{10}	—	August 21, 2004	Siding Spring	SSS	·	3.9 km	MPC · JPL
226737	2004 QA_{28}	—	August 23, 2004	Kitt Peak	Spacewatch	AGN	1.3 km	MPC · JPL
226738	2004 RY_{1}	—	September 6, 2004	Socorro	LINEAR	·	4.7 km	MPC · JPL
226739	2004 RD_{3}	—	September 6, 2004	Socorro	LINEAR	HNS	2.5 km	MPC · JPL
226740	2004 RR_{4}	—	September 4, 2004	Palomar	NEAT	·	2.9 km	MPC · JPL
226741	2004 RH_{13}	—	September 4, 2004	Palomar	NEAT	EUN	2.0 km	MPC · JPL
226742	2004 RS_{14}	—	September 6, 2004	Siding Spring	SSS	·	2.5 km	MPC · JPL
226743	2004 RN_{17}	—	September 7, 2004	Socorro	LINEAR	·	2.7 km	MPC · JPL
226744	2004 RA_{19}	—	September 7, 2004	Goodricke-Pigott	Goodricke-Pigott	·	2.3 km	MPC · JPL
226745	2004 RC_{23}	—	September 7, 2004	Kitt Peak	Spacewatch	·	2.3 km	MPC · JPL
226746	2004 RF_{23}	—	September 7, 2004	Kitt Peak	Spacewatch	·	3.4 km	MPC · JPL
226747	2004 RK_{25}	—	September 7, 2004	Socorro	LINEAR	·	2.3 km	MPC · JPL
226748	2004 RN_{26}	—	September 6, 2004	Palomar	NEAT	·	2.1 km	MPC · JPL
226749	2004 RY_{27}	—	September 6, 2004	Siding Spring	SSS	·	2.2 km	MPC · JPL
226750	2004 RD_{28}	—	September 6, 2004	Siding Spring	SSS	·	3.1 km	MPC · JPL
226751	2004 RE_{28}	—	September 6, 2004	Siding Spring	SSS	AEO	2.4 km	MPC · JPL
226752	2004 RB_{40}	—	September 7, 2004	Socorro	LINEAR	·	3.4 km	MPC · JPL
226753	2004 RA_{46}	—	September 8, 2004	Socorro	LINEAR	·	2.3 km	MPC · JPL
226754	2004 RC_{50}	—	September 8, 2004	Socorro	LINEAR	·	2.6 km	MPC · JPL
226755	2004 RW_{53}	—	September 8, 2004	Socorro	LINEAR	·	2.1 km	MPC · JPL
226756	2004 RU_{61}	—	September 8, 2004	Socorro	LINEAR	·	2.3 km	MPC · JPL
226757	2004 RX_{61}	—	September 8, 2004	Socorro	LINEAR	·	3.1 km	MPC · JPL
226758	2004 RF_{62}	—	September 8, 2004	Socorro	LINEAR	·	2.9 km	MPC · JPL
226759	2004 RE_{71}	—	September 8, 2004	Socorro	LINEAR	AGN	1.5 km	MPC · JPL
226760	2004 RK_{74}	—	September 8, 2004	Socorro	LINEAR	ADE	4.7 km	MPC · JPL
226761	2004 RL_{74}	—	September 8, 2004	Socorro	LINEAR	·	2.0 km	MPC · JPL
226762	2004 RA_{77}	—	September 8, 2004	Socorro	LINEAR	·	2.8 km	MPC · JPL
226763	2004 RB_{78}	—	September 8, 2004	Socorro	LINEAR	·	2.4 km	MPC · JPL
226764	2004 RM_{87}	—	September 7, 2004	Kitt Peak	Spacewatch	·	1.8 km	MPC · JPL
226765	2004 RO_{88}	—	September 8, 2004	Socorro	LINEAR	GEF	2.2 km	MPC · JPL
226766	2004 RY_{97}	—	September 8, 2004	Socorro	LINEAR	·	2.5 km	MPC · JPL
226767	2004 RE_{99}	—	September 8, 2004	Socorro	LINEAR	·	2.4 km	MPC · JPL
226768	2004 RA_{108}	—	September 9, 2004	Socorro	LINEAR	GEF	2.0 km	MPC · JPL
226769	2004 RA_{116}	—	September 7, 2004	Kitt Peak	Spacewatch	AEO	1.6 km	MPC · JPL
226770	2004 RF_{116}	—	September 7, 2004	Kitt Peak	Spacewatch	AGN	1.3 km	MPC · JPL
226771	2004 RL_{116}	—	September 7, 2004	Socorro	LINEAR	HOF	5.0 km	MPC · JPL
226772	2004 RX_{119}	—	September 7, 2004	Kitt Peak	Spacewatch	·	1.7 km	MPC · JPL
226773	2004 RP_{122}	—	September 7, 2004	Kitt Peak	Spacewatch	·	3.5 km	MPC · JPL
226774	2004 RR_{125}	—	September 7, 2004	Kitt Peak	Spacewatch	·	2.0 km	MPC · JPL
226775	2004 RA_{136}	—	September 7, 2004	Kitt Peak	Spacewatch	·	2.1 km	MPC · JPL
226776	2004 RO_{138}	—	September 8, 2004	Palomar	NEAT	·	3.1 km	MPC · JPL
226777	2004 RB_{142}	—	September 8, 2004	Socorro	LINEAR	PAD	3.2 km	MPC · JPL
226778	2004 RL_{142}	—	September 8, 2004	Socorro	LINEAR	TEL	2.0 km	MPC · JPL
226779	2004 RW_{143}	—	September 8, 2004	Socorro	LINEAR	AGN ·	2.2 km	MPC · JPL
226780	2004 RO_{144}	—	September 8, 2004	Kvistaberg	Uppsala-DLR Asteroid Survey	·	2.8 km	MPC · JPL
226781	2004 RJ_{145}	—	September 9, 2004	Socorro	LINEAR	NEM	2.5 km	MPC · JPL
226782	2004 RB_{150}	—	September 9, 2004	Socorro	LINEAR	·	2.8 km	MPC · JPL
226783	2004 RQ_{153}	—	September 10, 2004	Socorro	LINEAR	·	2.3 km	MPC · JPL
226784	2004 RS_{155}	—	September 10, 2004	Socorro	LINEAR	·	3.1 km	MPC · JPL
226785	2004 RP_{159}	—	September 10, 2004	Socorro	LINEAR	·	2.7 km	MPC · JPL
226786	2004 RD_{160}	—	September 10, 2004	Socorro	LINEAR	·	3.7 km	MPC · JPL
226787	2004 RQ_{166}	—	September 7, 2004	Kitt Peak	Spacewatch	·	2.1 km	MPC · JPL
226788	2004 RV_{170}	—	September 8, 2004	Palomar	NEAT	DOR	4.2 km	MPC · JPL
226789	2004 RZ_{172}	—	September 9, 2004	Kitt Peak	Spacewatch	PAD	3.7 km	MPC · JPL
226790	2004 RV_{174}	—	September 10, 2004	Socorro	LINEAR	·	3.1 km	MPC · JPL
226791	2004 RH_{177}	—	September 10, 2004	Socorro	LINEAR	·	2.9 km	MPC · JPL
226792	2004 RH_{180}	—	September 10, 2004	Socorro	LINEAR	·	3.2 km	MPC · JPL
226793	2004 RT_{182}	—	September 10, 2004	Socorro	LINEAR	·	3.1 km	MPC · JPL
226794	2004 RL_{183}	—	September 10, 2004	Socorro	LINEAR	·	3.2 km	MPC · JPL
226795	2004 RU_{187}	—	September 10, 2004	Socorro	LINEAR	·	4.0 km	MPC · JPL
226796	2004 RO_{188}	—	September 10, 2004	Socorro	LINEAR	·	4.0 km	MPC · JPL
226797	2004 RG_{193}	—	September 10, 2004	Socorro	LINEAR	GEF ·	5.1 km	MPC · JPL
226798	2004 RN_{201}	—	September 10, 2004	Kitt Peak	Spacewatch	·	3.7 km	MPC · JPL
226799	2004 RU_{201}	—	September 10, 2004	Kitt Peak	Spacewatch	AGN	1.4 km	MPC · JPL
226800	2004 RM_{202}	—	September 11, 2004	Socorro	LINEAR	·	2.6 km	MPC · JPL

== 226801–226900 ==
back to top

Designation			Discovery			Properties		Ref
Permanent	Provisional	Named after	Date	Site	Discoverer(s)	Category	Diam.	Ref
226801	2004 RK_{205}	—	September 8, 2004	Socorro	LINEAR	·	3.0 km	MPC · JPL
226802	2004 RF_{209}	—	September 11, 2004	Socorro	LINEAR	·	2.6 km	MPC · JPL
226803	2004 RH_{211}	—	September 11, 2004	Socorro	LINEAR	JUN	1.6 km	MPC · JPL
226804	2004 RB_{213}	—	September 11, 2004	Socorro	LINEAR	·	3.9 km	MPC · JPL
226805	2004 RS_{216}	—	September 11, 2004	Socorro	LINEAR	·	4.4 km	MPC · JPL
226806	2004 RV_{216}	—	September 11, 2004	Socorro	LINEAR	·	3.8 km	MPC · JPL
226807	2004 RB_{217}	—	September 11, 2004	Socorro	LINEAR	EUN	2.0 km	MPC · JPL
226808	2004 RC_{217}	—	September 11, 2004	Socorro	LINEAR	·	2.4 km	MPC · JPL
226809	2004 RA_{222}	—	September 13, 2004	Socorro	LINEAR	·	2.4 km	MPC · JPL
226810	2004 RL_{222}	—	September 14, 2004	Wrightwood	J. W. Young	EOS	2.3 km	MPC · JPL
226811	2004 RB_{225}	—	September 9, 2004	Socorro	LINEAR	·	2.5 km	MPC · JPL
226812	2004 RN_{226}	—	September 9, 2004	Socorro	LINEAR	·	3.6 km	MPC · JPL
226813	2004 RA_{227}	—	September 9, 2004	Kitt Peak	Spacewatch	HOF	4.5 km	MPC · JPL
226814	2004 RM_{230}	—	September 9, 2004	Kitt Peak	Spacewatch	KOR	2.1 km	MPC · JPL
226815	2004 RC_{231}	—	September 9, 2004	Kitt Peak	Spacewatch	KOR	1.6 km	MPC · JPL
226816	2004 RE_{235}	—	September 10, 2004	Socorro	LINEAR	·	3.1 km	MPC · JPL
226817	2004 RP_{239}	—	September 10, 2004	Kitt Peak	Spacewatch	HOF	3.0 km	MPC · JPL
226818	2004 RM_{245}	—	September 10, 2004	Kitt Peak	Spacewatch	·	2.2 km	MPC · JPL
226819	2004 RH_{254}	—	September 6, 2004	Palomar	NEAT	PAD	4.2 km	MPC · JPL
226820	2004 RR_{254}	—	September 6, 2004	Palomar	NEAT	·	4.3 km	MPC · JPL
226821	2004 RE_{259}	—	September 10, 2004	Kitt Peak	Spacewatch	HOF	3.2 km	MPC · JPL
226822	2004 RV_{285}	—	September 15, 2004	Kitt Peak	Spacewatch	HOF	3.4 km	MPC · JPL
226823	2004 RA_{287}	—	September 15, 2004	Socorro	LINEAR	WIT	1.3 km	MPC · JPL
226824	2004 RW_{287}	—	September 15, 2004	7300	W. K. Y. Yeung	·	4.2 km	MPC · JPL
226825	2004 RN_{295}	—	September 11, 2004	Kitt Peak	Spacewatch	·	2.1 km	MPC · JPL
226826	2004 RC_{307}	—	September 12, 2004	Socorro	LINEAR	·	3.5 km	MPC · JPL
226827	2004 RM_{315}	—	September 15, 2004	Siding Spring	SSS	GEF	1.7 km	MPC · JPL
226828	2004 RR_{321}	—	September 13, 2004	Socorro	LINEAR	HYG · slow	5.3 km	MPC · JPL
226829	2004 RW_{323}	—	September 13, 2004	Socorro	LINEAR	·	4.8 km	MPC · JPL
226830	2004 RH_{324}	—	September 13, 2004	Kitt Peak	Spacewatch	·	2.7 km	MPC · JPL
226831	2004 RS_{324}	—	September 13, 2004	Socorro	LINEAR	·	3.5 km	MPC · JPL
226832	2004 RA_{333}	—	September 15, 2004	Anderson Mesa	LONEOS	·	2.1 km	MPC · JPL
226833	2004 RU_{334}	—	September 15, 2004	Anderson Mesa	LONEOS	·	4.3 km	MPC · JPL
226834	2004 RL_{336}	—	September 15, 2004	Kitt Peak	Spacewatch	·	2.0 km	MPC · JPL
226835	2004 RJ_{337}	—	September 15, 2004	Kitt Peak	Spacewatch	·	3.3 km	MPC · JPL
226836	2004 SE_{13}	—	September 17, 2004	Socorro	LINEAR	HOF	4.1 km	MPC · JPL
226837	2004 SZ_{16}	—	September 17, 2004	Anderson Mesa	LONEOS	DOR	4.0 km	MPC · JPL
226838	2004 SL_{19}	—	September 18, 2004	Socorro	LINEAR	GEF	1.9 km	MPC · JPL
226839	2004 SV_{22}	—	September 17, 2004	Kitt Peak	Spacewatch	·	2.2 km	MPC · JPL
226840	2004 SR_{23}	—	September 17, 2004	Kitt Peak	Spacewatch	KOR	1.6 km	MPC · JPL
226841	2004 SV_{23}	—	September 17, 2004	Kitt Peak	Spacewatch	·	2.4 km	MPC · JPL
226842	2004 SV_{25}	—	September 22, 2004	Desert Eagle	W. K. Y. Yeung	(13314)	4.4 km	MPC · JPL
226843	2004 ST_{30}	—	September 17, 2004	Socorro	LINEAR	·	2.4 km	MPC · JPL
226844	2004 SF_{40}	—	September 17, 2004	Socorro	LINEAR	·	3.4 km	MPC · JPL
226845	2004 SG_{40}	—	September 17, 2004	Socorro	LINEAR	·	4.1 km	MPC · JPL
226846	2004 SJ_{45}	—	September 18, 2004	Socorro	LINEAR	·	2.3 km	MPC · JPL
226847	2004 SM_{45}	—	September 18, 2004	Socorro	LINEAR	·	3.6 km	MPC · JPL
226848	2004 SB_{46}	—	September 18, 2004	Socorro	LINEAR	·	2.3 km	MPC · JPL
226849	2004 SX_{46}	—	September 18, 2004	Socorro	LINEAR	HOF	4.3 km	MPC · JPL
226850	2004 SH_{47}	—	September 18, 2004	Socorro	LINEAR	·	2.4 km	MPC · JPL
226851	2004 SO_{50}	—	September 22, 2004	Socorro	LINEAR	AGN	1.9 km	MPC · JPL
226852	2004 SC_{57}	—	September 16, 2004	Anderson Mesa	LONEOS	·	2.8 km	MPC · JPL
226853	2004 TD_{2}	—	October 4, 2004	Kitt Peak	Spacewatch	·	2.9 km	MPC · JPL
226854	2004 TN_{4}	—	October 4, 2004	Kitt Peak	Spacewatch	·	3.6 km	MPC · JPL
226855	2004 TR_{11}	—	October 7, 2004	Kitt Peak	Spacewatch	·	2.4 km	MPC · JPL
226856	2004 TX_{11}	—	October 5, 2004	Goodricke-Pigott	R. A. Tucker	·	3.8 km	MPC · JPL
226857	2004 TU_{13}	—	October 6, 2004	Sonoita	W. R. Cooney Jr., Gross, J.	·	2.8 km	MPC · JPL
226858 Ivanpuluj	2004 TY_{13}	Ivanpuluj	October 8, 2004	Andrushivka	Andrushivka	·	4.7 km	MPC · JPL
226859	2004 TZ_{14}	—	October 10, 2004	Goodricke-Pigott	R. A. Tucker	·	2.7 km	MPC · JPL
226860	2004 TS_{17}	—	October 8, 2004	Kitt Peak	Spacewatch	·	3.5 km	MPC · JPL
226861 Elimaor	2004 TV_{18}	Elimaor	October 14, 2004	Vail-Jarnac	Jarnac	·	3.0 km	MPC · JPL
226862	2004 TE_{38}	—	October 4, 2004	Kitt Peak	Spacewatch	·	2.7 km	MPC · JPL
226863	2004 TK_{38}	—	October 4, 2004	Kitt Peak	Spacewatch	·	3.3 km	MPC · JPL
226864	2004 TC_{39}	—	October 4, 2004	Kitt Peak	Spacewatch	·	3.0 km	MPC · JPL
226865	2004 TT_{40}	—	October 4, 2004	Kitt Peak	Spacewatch	(12739)	2.2 km	MPC · JPL
226866	2004 TH_{41}	—	October 4, 2004	Anderson Mesa	LONEOS	·	3.1 km	MPC · JPL
226867	2004 TU_{46}	—	October 4, 2004	Kitt Peak	Spacewatch	AGN	1.6 km	MPC · JPL
226868	2004 TP_{48}	—	October 4, 2004	Kitt Peak	Spacewatch	KOR	1.9 km	MPC · JPL
226869	2004 TK_{56}	—	October 5, 2004	Kitt Peak	Spacewatch	HOF	2.7 km	MPC · JPL
226870	2004 TD_{60}	—	October 5, 2004	Anderson Mesa	LONEOS	KOR	1.8 km	MPC · JPL
226871	2004 TO_{73}	—	October 6, 2004	Kitt Peak	Spacewatch	KOR	1.6 km	MPC · JPL
226872	2004 TX_{75}	—	October 6, 2004	Palomar	NEAT	·	3.6 km	MPC · JPL
226873	2004 TU_{78}	—	October 4, 2004	Kitt Peak	Spacewatch	·	2.9 km	MPC · JPL
226874	2004 TP_{81}	—	October 5, 2004	Kitt Peak	Spacewatch	·	2.4 km	MPC · JPL
226875	2004 TR_{83}	—	October 5, 2004	Kitt Peak	Spacewatch	PAD	3.6 km	MPC · JPL
226876	2004 TB_{85}	—	October 5, 2004	Kitt Peak	Spacewatch	·	1.9 km	MPC · JPL
226877	2004 TD_{93}	—	October 5, 2004	Kitt Peak	Spacewatch	KOR	1.9 km	MPC · JPL
226878	2004 TD_{94}	—	October 5, 2004	Kitt Peak	Spacewatch	·	2.6 km	MPC · JPL
226879	2004 TG_{97}	—	October 5, 2004	Kitt Peak	Spacewatch	·	1.9 km	MPC · JPL
226880	2004 TY_{107}	—	October 7, 2004	Socorro	LINEAR	AGN	1.8 km	MPC · JPL
226881	2004 TF_{122}	—	October 7, 2004	Anderson Mesa	LONEOS	·	3.9 km	MPC · JPL
226882	2004 TY_{122}	—	October 7, 2004	Anderson Mesa	LONEOS	·	2.4 km	MPC · JPL
226883	2004 TF_{124}	—	October 7, 2004	Socorro	LINEAR	AGN	1.8 km	MPC · JPL
226884	2004 TX_{126}	—	October 7, 2004	Socorro	LINEAR	·	4.1 km	MPC · JPL
226885	2004 TS_{129}	—	October 7, 2004	Socorro	LINEAR	AGN	1.7 km	MPC · JPL
226886	2004 TM_{130}	—	October 7, 2004	Socorro	LINEAR	·	4.8 km	MPC · JPL
226887	2004 TO_{133}	—	October 7, 2004	Anderson Mesa	LONEOS	slow	4.7 km	MPC · JPL
226888	2004 TZ_{133}	—	October 7, 2004	Palomar	NEAT	·	2.8 km	MPC · JPL
226889	2004 TY_{134}	—	October 8, 2004	Anderson Mesa	LONEOS	·	2.5 km	MPC · JPL
226890	2004 TK_{135}	—	October 8, 2004	Anderson Mesa	LONEOS	·	3.0 km	MPC · JPL
226891	2004 TG_{139}	—	October 9, 2004	Anderson Mesa	LONEOS	·	3.3 km	MPC · JPL
226892	2004 TZ_{143}	—	October 4, 2004	Kitt Peak	Spacewatch	·	2.8 km	MPC · JPL
226893	2004 TQ_{144}	—	October 4, 2004	Kitt Peak	Spacewatch	EOS	2.8 km	MPC · JPL
226894	2004 TR_{144}	—	October 4, 2004	Kitt Peak	Spacewatch	·	2.1 km	MPC · JPL
226895	2004 TB_{145}	—	October 4, 2004	Kitt Peak	Spacewatch	·	2.4 km	MPC · JPL
226896	2004 TK_{147}	—	October 6, 2004	Kitt Peak	Spacewatch	·	3.4 km	MPC · JPL
226897	2004 TK_{153}	—	October 6, 2004	Kitt Peak	Spacewatch	KOR	1.5 km	MPC · JPL
226898	2004 TQ_{153}	—	October 6, 2004	Kitt Peak	Spacewatch	·	2.1 km	MPC · JPL
226899	2004 TS_{155}	—	October 6, 2004	Kitt Peak	Spacewatch	·	2.9 km	MPC · JPL
226900	2004 TO_{156}	—	October 6, 2004	Kitt Peak	Spacewatch	·	2.3 km	MPC · JPL

== 226901–227000 ==
back to top

Designation			Discovery			Properties		Ref
Permanent	Provisional	Named after	Date	Site	Discoverer(s)	Category	Diam.	Ref
226901	2004 TL_{165}	—	October 7, 2004	Kitt Peak	Spacewatch	·	3.1 km	MPC · JPL
226902	2004 TD_{168}	—	October 7, 2004	Socorro	LINEAR	·	2.8 km	MPC · JPL
226903	2004 TS_{168}	—	October 7, 2004	Socorro	LINEAR	·	3.3 km	MPC · JPL
226904	2004 TY_{173}	—	October 8, 2004	Socorro	LINEAR	BRA	3.5 km	MPC · JPL
226905	2004 TN_{185}	—	October 7, 2004	Kitt Peak	Spacewatch	·	3.4 km	MPC · JPL
226906	2004 TG_{190}	—	October 7, 2004	Kitt Peak	Spacewatch	·	1.8 km	MPC · JPL
226907	2004 TG_{192}	—	October 7, 2004	Kitt Peak	Spacewatch	·	1.9 km	MPC · JPL
226908	2004 TJ_{192}	—	October 7, 2004	Kitt Peak	Spacewatch	·	2.1 km	MPC · JPL
226909	2004 TC_{196}	—	October 7, 2004	Kitt Peak	Spacewatch	·	2.4 km	MPC · JPL
226910	2004 TF_{196}	—	October 7, 2004	Kitt Peak	Spacewatch	·	2.4 km	MPC · JPL
226911	2004 TF_{198}	—	October 7, 2004	Kitt Peak	Spacewatch	AST	3.2 km	MPC · JPL
226912	2004 TG_{200}	—	October 7, 2004	Kitt Peak	Spacewatch	KOR	1.4 km	MPC · JPL
226913	2004 TN_{201}	—	October 7, 2004	Kitt Peak	Spacewatch	·	4.1 km	MPC · JPL
226914	2004 TC_{202}	—	October 7, 2004	Kitt Peak	Spacewatch	AGN	1.9 km	MPC · JPL
226915	2004 TZ_{205}	—	October 7, 2004	Kitt Peak	Spacewatch	·	2.3 km	MPC · JPL
226916	2004 TF_{207}	—	October 7, 2004	Kitt Peak	Spacewatch	KOR	1.9 km	MPC · JPL
226917	2004 TH_{208}	—	October 7, 2004	Kitt Peak	Spacewatch	AEO	2.4 km	MPC · JPL
226918	2004 TP_{208}	—	October 8, 2004	Kitt Peak	Spacewatch	·	3.0 km	MPC · JPL
226919	2004 TS_{209}	—	October 8, 2004	Kitt Peak	Spacewatch	·	2.1 km	MPC · JPL
226920	2004 TT_{221}	—	October 7, 2004	Socorro	LINEAR	DOR	5.6 km	MPC · JPL
226921	2004 TO_{224}	—	October 8, 2004	Kitt Peak	Spacewatch	KOR	1.6 km	MPC · JPL
226922	2004 TC_{239}	—	October 9, 2004	Kitt Peak	Spacewatch	KOR	1.5 km	MPC · JPL
226923	2004 TT_{240}	—	October 10, 2004	Socorro	LINEAR	·	4.0 km	MPC · JPL
226924	2004 TL_{245}	—	October 7, 2004	Kitt Peak	Spacewatch	·	2.7 km	MPC · JPL
226925	2004 TN_{251}	—	October 9, 2004	Kitt Peak	Spacewatch	·	2.7 km	MPC · JPL
226926	2004 TF_{253}	—	October 9, 2004	Kitt Peak	Spacewatch	·	2.3 km	MPC · JPL
226927	2004 TU_{273}	—	October 9, 2004	Kitt Peak	Spacewatch	·	2.1 km	MPC · JPL
226928	2004 TB_{276}	—	October 9, 2004	Kitt Peak	Spacewatch	·	2.8 km	MPC · JPL
226929	2004 TG_{279}	—	October 10, 2004	Socorro	LINEAR	·	3.2 km	MPC · JPL
226930	2004 TK_{279}	—	October 10, 2004	Socorro	LINEAR	WIT	1.3 km	MPC · JPL
226931	2004 TT_{280}	—	October 10, 2004	Kitt Peak	Spacewatch	·	2.9 km	MPC · JPL
226932	2004 TK_{282}	—	October 7, 2004	Anderson Mesa	LONEOS	AGN	2.1 km	MPC · JPL
226933	2004 TV_{286}	—	October 9, 2004	Socorro	LINEAR	MRX	1.9 km	MPC · JPL
226934	2004 TC_{292}	—	October 10, 2004	Kitt Peak	Spacewatch	AGN	1.3 km	MPC · JPL
226935	2004 TV_{292}	—	October 10, 2004	Kitt Peak	Spacewatch	KOR	1.5 km	MPC · JPL
226936	2004 TG_{299}	—	October 8, 2004	Anderson Mesa	LONEOS	·	3.1 km	MPC · JPL
226937	2004 TH_{300}	—	October 8, 2004	Socorro	LINEAR	·	2.7 km	MPC · JPL
226938	2004 TO_{309}	—	October 10, 2004	Kitt Peak	Spacewatch	·	2.8 km	MPC · JPL
226939	2004 TO_{310}	—	October 10, 2004	Socorro	LINEAR	·	3.1 km	MPC · JPL
226940	2004 TV_{317}	—	October 11, 2004	Kitt Peak	Spacewatch	·	3.0 km	MPC · JPL
226941	2004 TQ_{329}	—	October 9, 2004	Kitt Peak	Spacewatch	·	1.9 km	MPC · JPL
226942	2004 TS_{333}	—	October 9, 2004	Kitt Peak	Spacewatch	·	4.6 km	MPC · JPL
226943	2004 TV_{335}	—	October 10, 2004	Kitt Peak	Spacewatch	·	2.3 km	MPC · JPL
226944	2004 TZ_{344}	—	October 15, 2004	Kitt Peak	Spacewatch	·	4.3 km	MPC · JPL
226945	2004 TK_{355}	—	October 7, 2004	Socorro	LINEAR	·	3.0 km	MPC · JPL
226946	2004 TN_{355}	—	October 7, 2004	Socorro	LINEAR	·	3.6 km	MPC · JPL
226947	2004 TU_{358}	—	October 5, 2004	Anderson Mesa	LONEOS	·	2.6 km	MPC · JPL
226948	2004 TU_{366}	—	October 10, 2004	Socorro	LINEAR	·	3.1 km	MPC · JPL
226949	2004 TU_{367}	—	October 7, 2004	Kitt Peak	Spacewatch	(16286)	2.1 km	MPC · JPL
226950	2004 UJ_{4}	—	October 16, 2004	Socorro	LINEAR	MAR	2.1 km	MPC · JPL
226951	2004 VC_{13}	—	November 3, 2004	Palomar	NEAT	·	3.1 km	MPC · JPL
226952	2004 VX_{19}	—	November 4, 2004	Catalina	CSS	·	3.2 km	MPC · JPL
226953	2004 VQ_{38}	—	November 4, 2004	Kitt Peak	Spacewatch	·	2.8 km	MPC · JPL
226954	2004 VR_{40}	—	November 4, 2004	Kitt Peak	Spacewatch	·	2.7 km	MPC · JPL
226955	2004 VY_{40}	—	November 4, 2004	Kitt Peak	Spacewatch	·	3.2 km	MPC · JPL
226956	2004 VS_{43}	—	November 4, 2004	Kitt Peak	Spacewatch	EMA	4.2 km	MPC · JPL
226957	2004 VC_{52}	—	November 4, 2004	Catalina	CSS	EOS	3.1 km	MPC · JPL
226958	2004 VQ_{55}	—	November 4, 2004	Socorro	LINEAR	·	4.6 km	MPC · JPL
226959	2004 VX_{64}	—	November 10, 2004	Kitt Peak	Spacewatch	·	5.4 km	MPC · JPL
226960	2004 VX_{71}	—	November 11, 2004	Las Cruces	Dixon, D. S.	·	2.0 km	MPC · JPL
226961	2004 VO_{72}	—	November 9, 2004	Catalina	CSS	·	2.7 km	MPC · JPL
226962	2004 VY_{73}	—	November 12, 2004	Catalina	CSS	MRX	1.6 km	MPC · JPL
226963	2004 VX_{80}	—	November 4, 2004	Kitt Peak	Spacewatch	·	3.1 km	MPC · JPL
226964	2004 VC_{83}	—	November 10, 2004	Kitt Peak	Spacewatch	·	2.9 km	MPC · JPL
226965	2004 VE_{88}	—	November 11, 2004	Kitt Peak	Spacewatch	·	3.0 km	MPC · JPL
226966	2004 VM_{94}	—	November 10, 2004	Kitt Peak	Spacewatch	·	2.5 km	MPC · JPL
226967	2004 VF_{96}	—	November 11, 2004	Kitt Peak	Spacewatch	·	2.7 km	MPC · JPL
226968	2004 VV_{101}	—	November 9, 2004	Mauna Kea	Veillet, C.	HOF	3.8 km	MPC · JPL
226969	2004 VB_{107}	—	November 9, 2004	Mauna Kea	Veillet, C.	·	1.8 km	MPC · JPL
226970	2004 VS_{111}	—	November 3, 2004	Catalina	CSS	NAE	4.8 km	MPC · JPL
226971	2004 VH_{112}	—	November 11, 2004	Kitt Peak	Spacewatch	EOS	3.1 km	MPC · JPL
226972	2004 WV_{1}	—	November 17, 2004	Campo Imperatore	CINEOS	THM	3.5 km	MPC · JPL
226973	2004 WZ_{5}	—	November 19, 2004	Socorro	LINEAR	615	2.2 km	MPC · JPL
226974	2004 XW_{13}	—	December 9, 2004	Catalina	CSS	·	6.5 km	MPC · JPL
226975	2004 XM_{16}	—	December 10, 2004	Socorro	LINEAR	H	1.0 km	MPC · JPL
226976	2004 XO_{17}	—	December 3, 2004	Kitt Peak	Spacewatch	·	3.9 km	MPC · JPL
226977	2004 XE_{19}	—	December 8, 2004	Socorro	LINEAR	·	6.2 km	MPC · JPL
226978	2004 XB_{20}	—	December 8, 2004	Socorro	LINEAR	·	3.0 km	MPC · JPL
226979	2004 XG_{22}	—	December 8, 2004	Socorro	LINEAR	·	3.1 km	MPC · JPL
226980	2004 XB_{23}	—	December 8, 2004	Socorro	LINEAR	·	3.5 km	MPC · JPL
226981	2004 XJ_{27}	—	December 10, 2004	Socorro	LINEAR	·	4.5 km	MPC · JPL
226982	2004 XN_{28}	—	December 10, 2004	Socorro	LINEAR	·	5.2 km	MPC · JPL
226983	2004 XF_{31}	—	December 8, 2004	Socorro	LINEAR	EOS	3.7 km	MPC · JPL
226984	2004 XS_{31}	—	December 9, 2004	Catalina	CSS	·	3.9 km	MPC · JPL
226985	2004 XR_{35}	—	December 2, 2004	Goodricke-Pigott	Goodricke-Pigott	·	3.3 km	MPC · JPL
226986	2004 XC_{40}	—	December 10, 2004	Socorro	LINEAR	·	4.3 km	MPC · JPL
226987	2004 XE_{44}	—	December 11, 2004	Campo Imperatore	CINEOS	KOR	2.2 km	MPC · JPL
226988	2004 XW_{48}	—	December 10, 2004	Kitt Peak	Spacewatch	HYG	4.6 km	MPC · JPL
226989	2004 XU_{54}	—	December 10, 2004	Socorro	LINEAR	EOS	4.2 km	MPC · JPL
226990	2004 XC_{59}	—	December 10, 2004	Kitt Peak	Spacewatch	·	6.1 km	MPC · JPL
226991	2004 XL_{61}	—	December 14, 2004	Socorro	LINEAR	H	960 m	MPC · JPL
226992	2004 XG_{64}	—	December 2, 2004	Kitt Peak	Spacewatch	EOS	3.3 km	MPC · JPL
226993	2004 XF_{70}	—	December 11, 2004	Socorro	LINEAR	·	7.7 km	MPC · JPL
226994	2004 XZ_{70}	—	December 11, 2004	Kitt Peak	Spacewatch	·	4.0 km	MPC · JPL
226995	2004 XL_{74}	—	December 8, 2004	Socorro	LINEAR	·	2.8 km	MPC · JPL
226996	2004 XS_{74}	—	December 9, 2004	Bergisch Gladbach	W. Bickel	·	5.6 km	MPC · JPL
226997	2004 XA_{77}	—	December 10, 2004	Kitt Peak	Spacewatch	HOF	4.9 km	MPC · JPL
226998	2004 XW_{78}	—	December 10, 2004	Socorro	LINEAR	·	4.3 km	MPC · JPL
226999	2004 XZ_{78}	—	December 10, 2004	Socorro	LINEAR	EOS	3.8 km	MPC · JPL
227000	2004 XN_{79}	—	December 10, 2004	Socorro	LINEAR	KOR	2.1 km	MPC · JPL

back to top

== See also ==
- Meanings of minor-planet names: 226001–227000
