= List of minor planets: 223001–224000 =

The following is a partial list of minor planets, running from minor-planet number 223001 through 224000, inclusive. The primary data for this and other partial lists is based on JPL's "Small-Body Orbital Elements" and data available from the Minor Planet Center. Critical list information is also provided by the MPC, unless otherwise specified from Lowell Observatory. A detailed description of the table's columns and additional sources are given on the main page including a complete list of every page in this series, and a statistical break-up on the dynamical classification of minor planets.

Also see the summary list of all named bodies in numerical and alphabetical order, and the corresponding naming citations for the number range of this particular list. New namings may only be added to this list after official publication, as the preannouncement of names is condemned by the Working Group for Small Bodies Nomenclature of the International Astronomical Union.

Near-Earth obj.	MBA (inner)	MBA (outer)	Centaur
Mars-crosser	MBA (middle)	Jupiter trojan	Trans-Neptunian obj.
Unclassified

== 223001–223100 ==
Designation			Discovery			Properties		Ref
Permanent	Provisional	Named after	Date	Site	Discoverer(s)	Category	Diam.	Ref
223001	2002 RQ_{177}	—	September 13, 2002	Palomar	NEAT	·	1.2 km	MPC · JPL
223002	2002 RS_{178}	—	September 14, 2002	Kitt Peak	Spacewatch	·	1.6 km	MPC · JPL
223003	2002 RS_{184}	—	September 12, 2002	Palomar	NEAT	CYB	7.0 km	MPC · JPL
223004	2002 RU_{188}	—	September 13, 2002	Palomar	NEAT	·	710 m	MPC · JPL
223005	2002 RX_{188}	—	September 13, 2002	Palomar	NEAT	·	1.1 km	MPC · JPL
223006	2002 RA_{196}	—	September 12, 2002	Palomar	NEAT	·	1.1 km	MPC · JPL
223007	2002 RR_{202}	—	September 13, 2002	Palomar	NEAT	(2076)	1.5 km	MPC · JPL
223008	2002 RN_{210}	—	September 15, 2002	Kitt Peak	Spacewatch	·	960 m	MPC · JPL
223009	2002 RH_{211}	—	September 14, 2002	Haleakala	NEAT	·	1.2 km	MPC · JPL
223010	2002 RA_{224}	—	September 13, 2002	Anderson Mesa	LONEOS	·	1.9 km	MPC · JPL
223011	2002 RW_{234}	—	September 14, 2002	Palomar	R. Matson	·	1.4 km	MPC · JPL
223012	2002 RS_{239}	—	September 14, 2002	Palomar	R. Matson	·	6.9 km	MPC · JPL
223013	2002 RH_{241}	—	September 14, 2002	Palomar	R. Matson	·	1.1 km	MPC · JPL
223014	2002 SA_{3}	—	September 27, 2002	Palomar	NEAT	PHO	2.8 km	MPC · JPL
223015	2002 SK_{3}	—	September 26, 2002	Palomar	NEAT	·	860 m	MPC · JPL
223016	2002 SJ_{6}	—	September 27, 2002	Palomar	NEAT	·	1.2 km	MPC · JPL
223017	2002 SW_{7}	—	September 27, 2002	Palomar	NEAT	·	1.1 km	MPC · JPL
223018	2002 SB_{12}	—	September 27, 2002	Palomar	NEAT	·	780 m	MPC · JPL
223019	2002 SC_{22}	—	September 26, 2002	Palomar	NEAT	·	1.2 km	MPC · JPL
223020	2002 SD_{24}	—	September 27, 2002	Anderson Mesa	LONEOS	·	970 m	MPC · JPL
223021	2002 SL_{24}	—	September 28, 2002	Palomar	NEAT	·	1.2 km	MPC · JPL
223022	2002 SQ_{30}	—	September 28, 2002	Haleakala	NEAT	·	1.2 km	MPC · JPL
223023	2002 SM_{35}	—	September 29, 2002	Haleakala	NEAT	·	880 m	MPC · JPL
223024	2002 SV_{41}	—	September 28, 2002	Haleakala	NEAT	PHO	1.6 km	MPC · JPL
223025	2002 SS_{42}	—	September 28, 2002	Haleakala	NEAT	·	1.4 km	MPC · JPL
223026	2002 SB_{45}	—	September 29, 2002	Haleakala	NEAT	·	830 m	MPC · JPL
223027	2002 ST_{51}	—	September 17, 2002	Palomar	NEAT	·	1.3 km	MPC · JPL
223028	2002 SL_{52}	—	September 17, 2002	Palomar	NEAT	·	1.3 km	MPC · JPL
223029	2002 SV_{71}	—	September 28, 2002	Haleakala	NEAT	·	1.4 km	MPC · JPL
223030	2002 TD_{1}	—	October 1, 2002	Anderson Mesa	LONEOS	·	1.2 km	MPC · JPL
223031	2002 TF_{13}	—	October 1, 2002	Anderson Mesa	LONEOS	·	840 m	MPC · JPL
223032	2002 TT_{15}	—	October 2, 2002	Socorro	LINEAR	·	1.6 km	MPC · JPL
223033	2002 TZ_{15}	—	October 2, 2002	Socorro	LINEAR	·	830 m	MPC · JPL
223034	2002 TW_{19}	—	October 2, 2002	Socorro	LINEAR	·	1.3 km	MPC · JPL
223035	2002 TL_{25}	—	October 2, 2002	Socorro	LINEAR	·	1.4 km	MPC · JPL
223036	2002 TU_{31}	—	October 2, 2002	Socorro	LINEAR	·	1.4 km	MPC · JPL
223037	2002 TU_{33}	—	October 2, 2002	Socorro	LINEAR	·	1.3 km	MPC · JPL
223038	2002 TF_{35}	—	October 2, 2002	Socorro	LINEAR	·	1.2 km	MPC · JPL
223039	2002 TG_{50}	—	October 2, 2002	Socorro	LINEAR	·	1.6 km	MPC · JPL
223040	2002 TJ_{50}	—	October 2, 2002	Socorro	LINEAR	·	1.6 km	MPC · JPL
223041	2002 TR_{50}	—	October 2, 2002	Socorro	LINEAR	·	1.7 km	MPC · JPL
223042	2002 TN_{56}	—	October 2, 2002	Campo Imperatore	CINEOS	·	1.4 km	MPC · JPL
223043	2002 TM_{71}	—	October 3, 2002	Palomar	NEAT	V	1.2 km	MPC · JPL
223044	2002 TP_{71}	—	October 3, 2002	Palomar	NEAT	·	1.5 km	MPC · JPL
223045	2002 TV_{74}	—	October 1, 2002	Anderson Mesa	LONEOS	·	2.0 km	MPC · JPL
223046	2002 TV_{76}	—	October 1, 2002	Anderson Mesa	LONEOS	V	1.2 km	MPC · JPL
223047	2002 TQ_{80}	—	October 1, 2002	Anderson Mesa	LONEOS	·	1 km	MPC · JPL
223048	2002 TX_{81}	—	October 1, 2002	Haleakala	NEAT	·	1.0 km	MPC · JPL
223049	2002 TC_{85}	—	October 2, 2002	Haleakala	NEAT	·	1.2 km	MPC · JPL
223050	2002 TS_{91}	—	October 3, 2002	Palomar	NEAT	·	990 m	MPC · JPL
223051	2002 TS_{95}	—	October 3, 2002	Palomar	NEAT	·	1.6 km	MPC · JPL
223052	2002 TR_{105}	—	October 4, 2002	Palomar	NEAT	HYG	4.2 km	MPC · JPL
223053	2002 TA_{132}	—	October 4, 2002	Socorro	LINEAR	V	970 m	MPC · JPL
223054	2002 TR_{134}	—	October 4, 2002	Palomar	NEAT	SYL · CYB	6.8 km	MPC · JPL
223055	2002 TZ_{150}	—	October 5, 2002	Palomar	NEAT	·	1.2 km	MPC · JPL
223056	2002 TS_{182}	—	October 4, 2002	Palomar	NEAT	(2076)	1.3 km	MPC · JPL
223057	2002 TD_{183}	—	October 4, 2002	Socorro	LINEAR	·	1.4 km	MPC · JPL
223058	2002 TA_{190}	—	October 5, 2002	Socorro	LINEAR	V	1.1 km	MPC · JPL
223059	2002 TR_{198}	—	October 5, 2002	Socorro	LINEAR	·	1.6 km	MPC · JPL
223060	2002 TN_{200}	—	October 4, 2002	Socorro	LINEAR	(2076)	1.3 km	MPC · JPL
223061	2002 TX_{205}	—	October 4, 2002	Socorro	LINEAR	·	1.2 km	MPC · JPL
223062	2002 TS_{207}	—	October 4, 2002	Socorro	LINEAR	NYS	2.5 km	MPC · JPL
223063	2002 TX_{207}	—	October 4, 2002	Socorro	LINEAR	·	1.6 km	MPC · JPL
223064	2002 TW_{224}	—	October 8, 2002	Anderson Mesa	LONEOS	·	1.3 km	MPC · JPL
223065	2002 TY_{228}	—	October 7, 2002	Haleakala	NEAT	·	1.6 km	MPC · JPL
223066	2002 TJ_{231}	—	October 8, 2002	Palomar	NEAT	·	2.0 km	MPC · JPL
223067	2002 TB_{239}	—	October 8, 2002	Anderson Mesa	LONEOS	·	1.5 km	MPC · JPL
223068	2002 TO_{239}	—	October 9, 2002	Socorro	LINEAR	·	1.1 km	MPC · JPL
223069	2002 TJ_{240}	—	October 9, 2002	Socorro	LINEAR	·	1.1 km	MPC · JPL
223070	2002 TV_{243}	—	October 9, 2002	Palomar	NEAT	·	900 m	MPC · JPL
223071	2002 TX_{243}	—	October 9, 2002	Socorro	LINEAR	·	1.1 km	MPC · JPL
223072	2002 TQ_{250}	—	October 7, 2002	Anderson Mesa	LONEOS	NYS	3.0 km	MPC · JPL
223073	2002 TM_{255}	—	October 9, 2002	Socorro	LINEAR	·	1.6 km	MPC · JPL
223074	2002 TB_{256}	—	October 9, 2002	Socorro	LINEAR	·	770 m	MPC · JPL
223075	2002 TZ_{258}	—	October 9, 2002	Socorro	LINEAR	·	1.3 km	MPC · JPL
223076	2002 TJ_{259}	—	October 9, 2002	Socorro	LINEAR	·	1.5 km	MPC · JPL
223077	2002 TR_{260}	—	October 9, 2002	Socorro	LINEAR	·	1.3 km	MPC · JPL
223078	2002 TK_{262}	—	October 10, 2002	Palomar	NEAT	·	1.1 km	MPC · JPL
223079	2002 TX_{269}	—	October 9, 2002	Socorro	LINEAR	·	1.1 km	MPC · JPL
223080	2002 TT_{270}	—	October 9, 2002	Socorro	LINEAR	·	1.1 km	MPC · JPL
223081	2002 TF_{278}	—	October 10, 2002	Socorro	LINEAR	·	2.2 km	MPC · JPL
223082	2002 TK_{283}	—	October 10, 2002	Socorro	LINEAR	V	940 m	MPC · JPL
223083	2002 TS_{284}	—	October 10, 2002	Socorro	LINEAR	(2076)	1.4 km	MPC · JPL
223084	2002 TX_{284}	—	October 10, 2002	Socorro	LINEAR	·	1.5 km	MPC · JPL
223085	2002 TL_{285}	—	October 10, 2002	Socorro	LINEAR	·	2.0 km	MPC · JPL
223086	2002 TY_{288}	—	October 10, 2002	Socorro	LINEAR	·	1.3 km	MPC · JPL
223087	2002 TX_{289}	—	October 10, 2002	Socorro	LINEAR	V	1.2 km	MPC · JPL
223088	2002 TX_{291}	—	October 10, 2002	Socorro	LINEAR	·	1.7 km	MPC · JPL
223089	2002 TX_{360}	—	October 10, 2002	Apache Point	SDSS	·	680 m	MPC · JPL
223090	2002 TX_{372}	—	October 15, 2002	Palomar	NEAT	V	1 km	MPC · JPL
223091	2002 TY_{381}	—	October 11, 2002	Palomar	NEAT	·	1.4 km	MPC · JPL
223092	2002 UY_{9}	—	October 28, 2002	Palomar	NEAT	·	1.2 km	MPC · JPL
223093	2002 UJ_{11}	—	October 29, 2002	Nogales	Tenagra II	·	1.0 km	MPC · JPL
223094	2002 UH_{17}	—	October 28, 2002	Haleakala	NEAT	·	1.0 km	MPC · JPL
223095	2002 UG_{19}	—	October 30, 2002	Haleakala	NEAT	NYS	1.5 km	MPC · JPL
223096	2002 UQ_{21}	—	October 30, 2002	Palomar	NEAT	V	1.2 km	MPC · JPL
223097	2002 UV_{31}	—	October 30, 2002	Haleakala	NEAT	·	1.2 km	MPC · JPL
223098	2002 UF_{33}	—	October 31, 2002	Anderson Mesa	LONEOS	V	850 m	MPC · JPL
223099	2002 UO_{35}	—	October 31, 2002	Palomar	NEAT	·	1.3 km	MPC · JPL
223100	2002 UU_{35}	—	October 31, 2002	Palomar	NEAT	·	1.1 km	MPC · JPL

== 223101–223200 ==
back to top

Designation			Discovery			Properties		Ref
Permanent	Provisional	Named after	Date	Site	Discoverer(s)	Category	Diam.	Ref
223101	2002 UX_{40}	—	October 31, 2002	Anderson Mesa	LONEOS	·	1.4 km	MPC · JPL
223102	2002 UP_{44}	—	October 31, 2002	Anderson Mesa	LONEOS	·	1.1 km	MPC · JPL
223103	2002 UT_{51}	—	October 29, 2002	Apache Point	SDSS	·	3.2 km	MPC · JPL
223104	2002 US_{66}	—	October 30, 2002	Apache Point	SDSS	·	900 m	MPC · JPL
223105	2002 VC_{5}	—	November 1, 2002	Palomar	NEAT	PHO	1.2 km	MPC · JPL
223106	2002 VC_{7}	—	November 1, 2002	Palomar	NEAT	NYS	1.3 km	MPC · JPL
223107	2002 VA_{13}	—	November 4, 2002	Palomar	NEAT	·	1.3 km	MPC · JPL
223108	2002 VK_{13}	—	November 4, 2002	Kitt Peak	Spacewatch	·	2.3 km	MPC · JPL
223109	2002 VW_{15}	—	November 5, 2002	Socorro	LINEAR	·	1.3 km	MPC · JPL
223110	2002 VO_{16}	—	November 5, 2002	Socorro	LINEAR	·	1.8 km	MPC · JPL
223111	2002 VX_{21}	—	November 5, 2002	Kitt Peak	Spacewatch	MAS	1.0 km	MPC · JPL
223112	2002 VP_{22}	—	November 5, 2002	Kitt Peak	Spacewatch	·	930 m	MPC · JPL
223113	2002 VL_{23}	—	November 5, 2002	Socorro	LINEAR	·	1.7 km	MPC · JPL
223114	2002 VX_{29}	—	November 5, 2002	Socorro	LINEAR	·	1.6 km	MPC · JPL
223115	2002 VE_{30}	—	November 5, 2002	Socorro	LINEAR	·	1.9 km	MPC · JPL
223116	2002 VJ_{30}	—	November 5, 2002	Socorro	LINEAR	(2076)	980 m	MPC · JPL
223117	2002 VS_{30}	—	November 5, 2002	Socorro	LINEAR	·	1.2 km	MPC · JPL
223118	2002 VU_{31}	—	November 5, 2002	Socorro	LINEAR	NYS	1.6 km	MPC · JPL
223119	2002 VN_{32}	—	November 5, 2002	Socorro	LINEAR	PHO	1.4 km	MPC · JPL
223120	2002 VZ_{32}	—	November 5, 2002	Socorro	LINEAR	NYS	1.3 km	MPC · JPL
223121	2002 VN_{33}	—	November 5, 2002	Socorro	LINEAR	V	1.1 km	MPC · JPL
223122	2002 VP_{33}	—	November 5, 2002	Socorro	LINEAR	·	1.5 km	MPC · JPL
223123	2002 VL_{39}	—	November 5, 2002	Socorro	LINEAR	·	1.5 km	MPC · JPL
223124	2002 VX_{45}	—	November 5, 2002	Palomar	NEAT	·	900 m	MPC · JPL
223125	2002 VE_{49}	—	November 5, 2002	Anderson Mesa	LONEOS	·	1.6 km	MPC · JPL
223126	2002 VJ_{57}	—	November 6, 2002	Haleakala	NEAT	·	1.5 km	MPC · JPL
223127	2002 VT_{61}	—	November 5, 2002	Socorro	LINEAR	·	1.3 km	MPC · JPL
223128	2002 VC_{63}	—	November 6, 2002	Anderson Mesa	LONEOS	·	1.7 km	MPC · JPL
223129	2002 VD_{67}	—	November 6, 2002	Haleakala	NEAT	·	1.5 km	MPC · JPL
223130	2002 VC_{73}	—	November 7, 2002	Socorro	LINEAR	·	1.1 km	MPC · JPL
223131	2002 VE_{75}	—	November 7, 2002	Socorro	LINEAR	·	2.0 km	MPC · JPL
223132	2002 VR_{76}	—	November 7, 2002	Socorro	LINEAR	·	1.9 km	MPC · JPL
223133	2002 VB_{82}	—	November 7, 2002	Socorro	LINEAR	·	1.9 km	MPC · JPL
223134	2002 VJ_{86}	—	November 8, 2002	Socorro	LINEAR	NYS	2.2 km	MPC · JPL
223135	2002 VN_{87}	—	November 8, 2002	Socorro	LINEAR	V	930 m	MPC · JPL
223136	2002 VM_{97}	—	November 12, 2002	Socorro	LINEAR	·	2.1 km	MPC · JPL
223137	2002 VW_{102}	—	November 12, 2002	Socorro	LINEAR	·	1.4 km	MPC · JPL
223138	2002 VP_{114}	—	November 13, 2002	Palomar	NEAT	·	1.3 km	MPC · JPL
223139	2002 VD_{120}	—	November 12, 2002	Socorro	LINEAR	·	2.2 km	MPC · JPL
223140	2002 VF_{129}	—	November 6, 2002	Socorro	LINEAR	V	970 m	MPC · JPL
223141	2002 VL_{131}	—	November 1, 2002	Palomar	S. F. Hönig	·	1.4 km	MPC · JPL
223142	2002 WZ_{1}	—	November 23, 2002	Palomar	NEAT	·	1.6 km	MPC · JPL
223143	2002 WK_{3}	—	November 24, 2002	Palomar	NEAT	·	1.2 km	MPC · JPL
223144	2002 WL_{8}	—	November 24, 2002	Palomar	NEAT	·	1.7 km	MPC · JPL
223145	2002 WX_{8}	—	November 27, 2002	Anderson Mesa	LONEOS	·	2.1 km	MPC · JPL
223146	2002 WG_{10}	—	November 24, 2002	Palomar	NEAT	·	1.2 km	MPC · JPL
223147	2002 WU_{13}	—	November 28, 2002	Anderson Mesa	LONEOS	·	1.7 km	MPC · JPL
223148	2002 WZ_{22}	—	November 24, 2002	Palomar	NEAT	·	1.3 km	MPC · JPL
223149	2002 WG_{26}	—	November 16, 2002	Palomar	NEAT	NYS	890 m	MPC · JPL
223150	2002 XA_{1}	—	December 1, 2002	Nashville	Clingan, R.	·	1.3 km	MPC · JPL
223151	2002 XP_{8}	—	December 2, 2002	Socorro	LINEAR	·	2.1 km	MPC · JPL
223152	2002 XE_{22}	—	December 3, 2002	Palomar	NEAT	·	1.4 km	MPC · JPL
223153	2002 XR_{27}	—	December 5, 2002	Socorro	LINEAR	V	1.1 km	MPC · JPL
223154	2002 XS_{33}	—	December 5, 2002	Socorro	LINEAR	V	1.1 km	MPC · JPL
223155	2002 XY_{34}	—	December 6, 2002	Socorro	LINEAR	NYS	1.4 km	MPC · JPL
223156	2002 XP_{35}	—	December 7, 2002	Fountain Hills	C. W. Juels, P. R. Holvorcem	PHO	2.2 km	MPC · JPL
223157	2002 XF_{42}	—	December 6, 2002	Socorro	LINEAR	·	1.9 km	MPC · JPL
223158	2002 XU_{49}	—	December 10, 2002	Socorro	LINEAR	·	1.5 km	MPC · JPL
223159	2002 XX_{49}	—	December 10, 2002	Socorro	LINEAR	·	1.3 km	MPC · JPL
223160	2002 XK_{50}	—	December 10, 2002	Socorro	LINEAR	·	2.2 km	MPC · JPL
223161	2002 XD_{71}	—	December 10, 2002	Socorro	LINEAR	·	2.0 km	MPC · JPL
223162	2002 XV_{75}	—	December 11, 2002	Socorro	LINEAR	·	1.3 km	MPC · JPL
223163	2002 XZ_{85}	—	December 11, 2002	Socorro	LINEAR	·	1.7 km	MPC · JPL
223164	2002 XD_{86}	—	December 11, 2002	Socorro	LINEAR	·	1.8 km	MPC · JPL
223165	2002 XB_{87}	—	December 11, 2002	Socorro	LINEAR	·	3.0 km	MPC · JPL
223166	2002 XE_{101}	—	December 5, 2002	Socorro	LINEAR	·	1.7 km	MPC · JPL
223167	2002 XT_{102}	—	December 5, 2002	Socorro	LINEAR	NYS	1.2 km	MPC · JPL
223168	2002 XX_{112}	—	December 6, 2002	Socorro	LINEAR	·	2.0 km	MPC · JPL
223169	2002 XQ_{115}	—	December 14, 2002	Socorro	LINEAR	·	2.1 km	MPC · JPL
223170	2002 YP_{7}	—	December 31, 2002	Socorro	LINEAR	·	1.6 km	MPC · JPL
223171	2002 YU_{10}	—	December 31, 2002	Socorro	LINEAR	·	3.0 km	MPC · JPL
223172	2002 YN_{14}	—	December 31, 2002	Socorro	LINEAR	·	2.6 km	MPC · JPL
223173	2002 YG_{21}	—	December 31, 2002	Socorro	LINEAR	V	1.0 km	MPC · JPL
223174	2002 YF_{22}	—	December 31, 2002	Socorro	LINEAR	·	1.7 km	MPC · JPL
223175	2002 YP_{25}	—	December 31, 2002	Socorro	LINEAR	MAS	1.1 km	MPC · JPL
223176	2002 YC_{26}	—	December 31, 2002	Socorro	LINEAR	·	1.8 km	MPC · JPL
223177	2002 YE_{27}	—	December 31, 2002	Socorro	LINEAR	NYS	1.3 km	MPC · JPL
223178	2003 AA_{4}	—	January 3, 2003	Socorro	LINEAR	·	2.7 km	MPC · JPL
223179	2003 AO_{5}	—	January 1, 2003	Socorro	LINEAR	·	1.8 km	MPC · JPL
223180	2003 AQ_{15}	—	January 4, 2003	Nashville	Clingan, R.	NYS	1.5 km	MPC · JPL
223181	2003 AO_{18}	—	January 5, 2003	Socorro	LINEAR	·	1.9 km	MPC · JPL
223182	2003 AQ_{29}	—	January 4, 2003	Socorro	LINEAR	NYS	1.9 km	MPC · JPL
223183	2003 AE_{40}	—	January 7, 2003	Socorro	LINEAR	·	2.1 km	MPC · JPL
223184	2003 AR_{44}	—	January 5, 2003	Socorro	LINEAR	·	1.3 km	MPC · JPL
223185	2003 AR_{49}	—	January 5, 2003	Socorro	LINEAR	NYS	1.6 km	MPC · JPL
223186	2003 AZ_{49}	—	January 5, 2003	Socorro	LINEAR	·	1.7 km	MPC · JPL
223187	2003 AK_{50}	—	January 5, 2003	Socorro	LINEAR	·	2.0 km	MPC · JPL
223188	2003 AP_{51}	—	January 5, 2003	Socorro	LINEAR	·	1.6 km	MPC · JPL
223189	2003 AF_{52}	—	January 5, 2003	Socorro	LINEAR	(6769)	1.9 km	MPC · JPL
223190	2003 AP_{53}	—	January 5, 2003	Socorro	LINEAR	·	1.7 km	MPC · JPL
223191	2003 AV_{59}	—	January 5, 2003	Socorro	LINEAR	MAS	1.3 km	MPC · JPL
223192	2003 AQ_{63}	—	January 8, 2003	Socorro	LINEAR	·	1.2 km	MPC · JPL
223193	2003 AX_{71}	—	January 8, 2003	Socorro	LINEAR	NYS	1.2 km	MPC · JPL
223194	2003 BP_{4}	—	January 24, 2003	La Silla	A. Boattini, H. Scholl	·	1.9 km	MPC · JPL
223195	2003 BW_{8}	—	January 26, 2003	Anderson Mesa	LONEOS	·	1.8 km	MPC · JPL
223196	2003 BX_{19}	—	January 26, 2003	Haleakala	NEAT	·	1.8 km	MPC · JPL
223197	2003 BD_{20}	—	January 27, 2003	Anderson Mesa	LONEOS	V	1.1 km	MPC · JPL
223198	2003 BP_{20}	—	January 27, 2003	Anderson Mesa	LONEOS	·	2.2 km	MPC · JPL
223199	2003 BM_{29}	—	January 27, 2003	Socorro	LINEAR	·	2.9 km	MPC · JPL
223200	2003 BF_{30}	—	January 27, 2003	Socorro	LINEAR	NYS	1.4 km	MPC · JPL

== 223201–223300 ==
back to top

Designation			Discovery			Properties		Ref
Permanent	Provisional	Named after	Date	Site	Discoverer(s)	Category	Diam.	Ref
223201	2003 BL_{30}	—	January 27, 2003	Socorro	LINEAR	·	2.0 km	MPC · JPL
223202	2003 BQ_{31}	—	January 27, 2003	Socorro	LINEAR	·	2.0 km	MPC · JPL
223203	2003 BH_{35}	—	January 27, 2003	Socorro	LINEAR	·	2.3 km	MPC · JPL
223204	2003 BX_{38}	—	January 27, 2003	Socorro	LINEAR	NYS	1.7 km	MPC · JPL
223205	2003 BK_{39}	—	January 27, 2003	Socorro	LINEAR	NYS	1.5 km	MPC · JPL
223206	2003 BS_{44}	—	January 27, 2003	Socorro	LINEAR	NYS	1.8 km	MPC · JPL
223207	2003 BY_{47}	—	January 30, 2003	Anderson Mesa	LONEOS	·	1.8 km	MPC · JPL
223208	2003 BQ_{48}	—	January 26, 2003	Anderson Mesa	LONEOS	NYS	1.6 km	MPC · JPL
223209	2003 BL_{49}	—	January 27, 2003	Anderson Mesa	LONEOS	NYS	1.5 km	MPC · JPL
223210	2003 BW_{51}	—	January 27, 2003	Socorro	LINEAR	·	1.2 km	MPC · JPL
223211	2003 BE_{57}	—	January 27, 2003	Socorro	LINEAR	3:2 · SHU	6.8 km	MPC · JPL
223212	2003 BY_{58}	—	January 27, 2003	Socorro	LINEAR	·	2.0 km	MPC · JPL
223213	2003 BT_{62}	—	January 28, 2003	Palomar	NEAT	·	2.1 km	MPC · JPL
223214	2003 BX_{65}	—	January 30, 2003	Anderson Mesa	LONEOS	·	1.3 km	MPC · JPL
223215	2003 BR_{76}	—	January 29, 2003	Palomar	NEAT	·	1.3 km	MPC · JPL
223216	2003 BM_{81}	—	January 31, 2003	Socorro	LINEAR	·	1.5 km	MPC · JPL
223217	2003 BO_{83}	—	January 31, 2003	Socorro	LINEAR	·	1.3 km	MPC · JPL
223218	2003 CK_{7}	—	February 1, 2003	Socorro	LINEAR	·	1.6 km	MPC · JPL
223219	2003 CH_{9}	—	February 2, 2003	Socorro	LINEAR	·	2.3 km	MPC · JPL
223220	2003 CW_{18}	—	February 6, 2003	Socorro	LINEAR	·	2.1 km	MPC · JPL
223221	2003 CF_{25}	—	February 3, 2003	Anderson Mesa	LONEOS	·	1.5 km	MPC · JPL
223222	2003 DY	—	February 21, 2003	Palomar	NEAT	NYS	1.5 km	MPC · JPL
223223	2003 DY_{5}	—	February 21, 2003	Palomar	NEAT	·	1.8 km	MPC · JPL
223224	2003 DN_{7}	—	February 21, 2003	Kvistaberg	Uppsala-DLR Asteroid Survey	·	2.2 km	MPC · JPL
223225	2003 DW_{7}	—	February 25, 2003	Kleť	J. Tichá, M. Tichý	·	1.8 km	MPC · JPL
223226	2003 DW_{13}	—	February 26, 2003	Haleakala	NEAT	·	1.5 km	MPC · JPL
223227	2003 DP_{14}	—	February 24, 2003	Haleakala	NEAT	·	2.0 km	MPC · JPL
223228	2003 DV_{16}	—	February 21, 2003	Palomar	NEAT	·	3.4 km	MPC · JPL
223229	2003 DE_{18}	—	February 19, 2003	Palomar	NEAT	·	2.0 km	MPC · JPL
223230	2003 DH_{21}	—	February 23, 2003	Anderson Mesa	LONEOS	·	2.9 km	MPC · JPL
223231	2003 DT_{21}	—	February 28, 2003	Socorro	LINEAR	H	810 m	MPC · JPL
223232	2003 DA_{24}	—	February 22, 2003	Palomar	NEAT	·	2.0 km	MPC · JPL
223233	2003 ET_{8}	—	March 6, 2003	Anderson Mesa	LONEOS	·	1.8 km	MPC · JPL
223234	2003 EC_{9}	—	March 6, 2003	Socorro	LINEAR	·	2.1 km	MPC · JPL
223235	2003 EY_{22}	—	March 6, 2003	Socorro	LINEAR	BRG	2.2 km	MPC · JPL
223236	2003 EG_{32}	—	March 7, 2003	Kitt Peak	Spacewatch	·	1.3 km	MPC · JPL
223237	2003 EJ_{34}	—	March 7, 2003	Socorro	LINEAR	·	1.9 km	MPC · JPL
223238	2003 EY_{42}	—	March 10, 2003	Kitt Peak	Spacewatch	L4	10 km	MPC · JPL
223239	2003 EZ_{46}	—	March 8, 2003	Anderson Mesa	LONEOS	MAR	1.8 km	MPC · JPL
223240	2003 EY_{52}	—	March 8, 2003	Socorro	LINEAR	EUN	2.2 km	MPC · JPL
223241	2003 FE_{4}	—	March 26, 2003	Palomar	NEAT	HNS	1.5 km	MPC · JPL
223242	2003 FS_{14}	—	March 23, 2003	Kitt Peak	Spacewatch	·	1.9 km	MPC · JPL
223243	2003 FN_{18}	—	March 24, 2003	Kitt Peak	Spacewatch	·	1.1 km	MPC · JPL
223244	2003 FO_{28}	—	March 24, 2003	Haleakala	NEAT	·	2.8 km	MPC · JPL
223245	2003 FR_{32}	—	March 23, 2003	Kitt Peak	Spacewatch	·	2.3 km	MPC · JPL
223246	2003 FQ_{36}	—	March 23, 2003	Kitt Peak	Spacewatch	·	2.0 km	MPC · JPL
223247	2003 FR_{51}	—	March 25, 2003	Catalina	CSS	·	1.8 km	MPC · JPL
223248	2003 FB_{59}	—	March 26, 2003	Palomar	NEAT	·	1.9 km	MPC · JPL
223249	2003 FF_{59}	—	March 26, 2003	Palomar	NEAT	KON	3.1 km	MPC · JPL
223250	2003 FJ_{67}	—	March 26, 2003	Palomar	NEAT	EUN	2.2 km	MPC · JPL
223251	2003 FB_{70}	—	March 26, 2003	Kitt Peak	Spacewatch	L4 · ERY	18 km	MPC · JPL
223252	2003 FQ_{72}	—	March 26, 2003	Palomar	NEAT	·	2.6 km	MPC · JPL
223253	2003 FJ_{79}	—	March 27, 2003	Kitt Peak	Spacewatch	·	2.7 km	MPC · JPL
223254	2003 FZ_{79}	—	March 27, 2003	Palomar	NEAT	·	2.8 km	MPC · JPL
223255	2003 FR_{81}	—	March 27, 2003	Kitt Peak	Spacewatch	EUN ·	4.2 km	MPC · JPL
223256	2003 FL_{85}	—	March 28, 2003	Catalina	CSS	·	2.3 km	MPC · JPL
223257	2003 FN_{85}	—	March 28, 2003	Catalina	CSS	·	2.6 km	MPC · JPL
223258	2003 FO_{93}	—	March 29, 2003	Anderson Mesa	LONEOS	EUN	2.0 km	MPC · JPL
223259	2003 FP_{95}	—	March 30, 2003	Anderson Mesa	LONEOS	·	2.6 km	MPC · JPL
223260	2003 FW_{100}	—	March 31, 2003	Anderson Mesa	LONEOS	·	2.3 km	MPC · JPL
223261	2003 FP_{104}	—	March 25, 2003	Haleakala	NEAT	·	3.3 km	MPC · JPL
223262	2003 FK_{114}	—	March 31, 2003	Kitt Peak	Spacewatch	KON	4.6 km	MPC · JPL
223263 Cheikhoumardia	2003 FR_{124}	Cheikhoumardia	March 30, 2003	Kitt Peak	M. W. Buie	·	3.8 km	MPC · JPL
223264	2003 FG_{131}	—	March 24, 2003	Kitt Peak	Spacewatch	·	2.0 km	MPC · JPL
223265	2003 GX_{1}	—	April 2, 2003	Haleakala	NEAT	·	6.3 km	MPC · JPL
223266	2003 GO_{10}	—	April 3, 2003	Anderson Mesa	LONEOS	·	3.0 km	MPC · JPL
223267	2003 GH_{13}	—	April 3, 2003	Anderson Mesa	LONEOS	·	2.0 km	MPC · JPL
223268	2003 GZ_{21}	—	April 7, 2003	Palomar	NEAT	L4	15 km	MPC · JPL
223269	2003 GB_{22}	—	April 6, 2003	Desert Eagle	W. K. Y. Yeung	·	1.8 km	MPC · JPL
223270	2003 GL_{27}	—	April 7, 2003	Kitt Peak	Spacewatch	·	2.2 km	MPC · JPL
223271	2003 GY_{32}	—	April 1, 2003	Cerro Tololo	Deep Lens Survey	·	1.7 km	MPC · JPL
223272	2003 GC_{33}	—	April 1, 2003	Cerro Tololo	Deep Lens Survey	L4	13 km	MPC · JPL
223273	2003 GJ_{35}	—	April 7, 2003	Palomar	NEAT	·	1.7 km	MPC · JPL
223274	2003 GP_{35}	—	April 9, 2003	Socorro	LINEAR	H	780 m	MPC · JPL
223275	2003 GH_{41}	—	April 9, 2003	Palomar	NEAT	EUN	1.5 km	MPC · JPL
223276	2003 GG_{46}	—	April 8, 2003	Palomar	NEAT	·	1.8 km	MPC · JPL
223277	2003 GJ_{50}	—	April 4, 2003	Kitt Peak	Spacewatch	·	2.1 km	MPC · JPL
223278 Brianduncan	2003 GR_{53}	Brianduncan	April 1, 2003	Kitt Peak	M. W. Buie	·	2.5 km	MPC · JPL
223279	2003 HS_{3}	—	April 24, 2003	Anderson Mesa	LONEOS	·	2.8 km	MPC · JPL
223280	2003 HH_{9}	—	April 24, 2003	Anderson Mesa	LONEOS	·	4.7 km	MPC · JPL
223281	2003 HM_{10}	—	April 25, 2003	Anderson Mesa	LONEOS	·	3.8 km	MPC · JPL
223282	2003 HL_{17}	—	April 25, 2003	Anderson Mesa	LONEOS	·	2.5 km	MPC · JPL
223283	2003 HG_{19}	—	April 26, 2003	Kitt Peak	Spacewatch	·	2.2 km	MPC · JPL
223284	2003 HF_{20}	—	April 26, 2003	Haleakala	NEAT	·	2.1 km	MPC · JPL
223285	2003 HF_{32}	—	April 28, 2003	Anderson Mesa	LONEOS	GEF	1.7 km	MPC · JPL
223286	2003 HW_{32}	—	April 29, 2003	Socorro	LINEAR	H	730 m	MPC · JPL
223287	2003 HW_{35}	—	April 27, 2003	Anderson Mesa	LONEOS	·	3.4 km	MPC · JPL
223288	2003 HY_{45}	—	April 27, 2003	Anderson Mesa	LONEOS	·	2.2 km	MPC · JPL
223289	2003 HH_{46}	—	April 28, 2003	Socorro	LINEAR	·	2.8 km	MPC · JPL
223290	2003 HR_{47}	—	April 29, 2003	Kitt Peak	Spacewatch	·	3.1 km	MPC · JPL
223291	2003 HN_{49}	—	April 30, 2003	Kitt Peak	Spacewatch	H	880 m	MPC · JPL
223292	2003 HM_{52}	—	April 29, 2003	Socorro	LINEAR	·	2.6 km	MPC · JPL
223293	2003 HM_{54}	—	April 24, 2003	Anderson Mesa	LONEOS	·	2.2 km	MPC · JPL
223294	2003 HO_{55}	—	April 27, 2003	Anderson Mesa	LONEOS	·	2.3 km	MPC · JPL
223295	2003 JS_{3}	—	May 2, 2003	Kitt Peak	Spacewatch	·	1.9 km	MPC · JPL
223296	2003 JD_{6}	—	May 1, 2003	Kitt Peak	Spacewatch	NEM	3.3 km	MPC · JPL
223297	2003 JP_{13}	—	May 5, 2003	Socorro	LINEAR	·	4.6 km	MPC · JPL
223298	2003 JE_{18}	—	May 1, 2003	Socorro	LINEAR	·	3.4 km	MPC · JPL
223299	2003 KL_{13}	—	May 27, 2003	Kitt Peak	Spacewatch	·	2.4 km	MPC · JPL
223300	2003 KJ_{14}	—	May 25, 2003	Kitt Peak	Spacewatch	·	2.3 km	MPC · JPL

== 223301–223400 ==
back to top

Designation			Discovery			Properties		Ref
Permanent	Provisional	Named after	Date	Site	Discoverer(s)	Category	Diam.	Ref
223301	2003 NA_{3}	—	July 2, 2003	Socorro	LINEAR	·	5.5 km	MPC · JPL
223302	2003 NH_{3}	—	July 4, 2003	Anderson Mesa	LONEOS	EUP	10 km	MPC · JPL
223303	2003 NP_{3}	—	July 3, 2003	Kitt Peak	Spacewatch	·	4.8 km	MPC · JPL
223304	2003 NF_{4}	—	July 3, 2003	Kitt Peak	Spacewatch	·	3.6 km	MPC · JPL
223305	2003 NL_{6}	—	July 7, 2003	Kitt Peak	Spacewatch	·	2.5 km	MPC · JPL
223306	2003 OV_{6}	—	July 22, 2003	Campo Imperatore	CINEOS	·	4.1 km	MPC · JPL
223307	2003 OH_{12}	—	July 22, 2003	Palomar	NEAT	TIR	4.0 km	MPC · JPL
223308	2003 OK_{14}	—	July 21, 2003	Palomar	NEAT	TIR	4.1 km	MPC · JPL
223309	2003 OP_{15}	—	July 23, 2003	Palomar	NEAT	EOS	2.7 km	MPC · JPL
223310	2003 OK_{17}	—	July 29, 2003	Campo Imperatore	CINEOS	·	5.3 km	MPC · JPL
223311	2003 OU_{27}	—	July 24, 2003	Palomar	NEAT	·	4.6 km	MPC · JPL
223312	2003 PM_{2}	—	August 2, 2003	Haleakala	NEAT	EOS	2.8 km	MPC · JPL
223313	2003 PS_{5}	—	August 1, 2003	Socorro	LINEAR	(1298)	5.5 km	MPC · JPL
223314	2003 PX_{7}	—	August 2, 2003	Haleakala	NEAT	EOS	3.2 km	MPC · JPL
223315	2003 QX_{4}	—	August 20, 2003	Campo Imperatore	CINEOS	·	3.2 km	MPC · JPL
223316	2003 QF_{5}	—	August 21, 2003	Campo Imperatore	CINEOS	LIX	6.6 km	MPC · JPL
223317	2003 QM_{10}	—	August 21, 2003	Socorro	LINEAR	·	5.9 km	MPC · JPL
223318	2003 QT_{12}	—	August 22, 2003	Haleakala	NEAT	LIX	6.3 km	MPC · JPL
223319	2003 QN_{18}	—	August 22, 2003	Palomar	NEAT	·	3.5 km	MPC · JPL
223320	2003 QR_{25}	—	August 22, 2003	Palomar	NEAT	VER	3.6 km	MPC · JPL
223321	2003 QB_{28}	—	August 20, 2003	Palomar	NEAT	·	7.7 km	MPC · JPL
223322	2003 QJ_{34}	—	August 22, 2003	Palomar	NEAT	·	4.5 km	MPC · JPL
223323	2003 QG_{44}	—	August 22, 2003	Campo Imperatore	CINEOS	·	4.0 km	MPC · JPL
223324	2003 QG_{46}	—	August 23, 2003	Palomar	NEAT	THM	4.8 km	MPC · JPL
223325	2003 QZ_{47}	—	August 20, 2003	Palomar	NEAT	·	2.9 km	MPC · JPL
223326	2003 QV_{49}	—	August 22, 2003	Palomar	NEAT	HYG	3.6 km	MPC · JPL
223327	2003 QN_{53}	—	August 23, 2003	Socorro	LINEAR	·	5.9 km	MPC · JPL
223328	2003 QX_{55}	—	August 23, 2003	Socorro	LINEAR	·	3.9 km	MPC · JPL
223329	2003 QP_{59}	—	August 23, 2003	Socorro	LINEAR	TIR	4.6 km	MPC · JPL
223330	2003 QL_{60}	—	August 23, 2003	Socorro	LINEAR	·	6.6 km	MPC · JPL
223331	2003 QV_{65}	—	August 25, 2003	Palomar	NEAT	EOS	3.7 km	MPC · JPL
223332	2003 QO_{68}	—	August 25, 2003	Socorro	LINEAR	·	4.7 km	MPC · JPL
223333	2003 QY_{70}	—	August 23, 2003	Palomar	NEAT	·	3.0 km	MPC · JPL
223334	2003 QU_{73}	—	August 26, 2003	Črni Vrh	Mikuž, H.	EOS	2.4 km	MPC · JPL
223335	2003 QN_{74}	—	August 24, 2003	Socorro	LINEAR	·	4.5 km	MPC · JPL
223336	2003 QP_{74}	—	August 24, 2003	Socorro	LINEAR	·	2.3 km	MPC · JPL
223337	2003 QS_{74}	—	August 24, 2003	Socorro	LINEAR	·	5.3 km	MPC · JPL
223338	2003 QK_{76}	—	August 24, 2003	Socorro	LINEAR	·	4.5 km	MPC · JPL
223339 Gregdunn	2003 QC_{89}	Gregdunn	August 26, 2003	Cerro Tololo	M. W. Buie	·	4.3 km	MPC · JPL
223340	2003 QT_{93}	—	August 28, 2003	Haleakala	NEAT	HYG	4.4 km	MPC · JPL
223341	2003 QZ_{93}	—	August 28, 2003	Haleakala	NEAT	·	4.7 km	MPC · JPL
223342	2003 QS_{96}	—	August 30, 2003	Kitt Peak	Spacewatch	THM	3.1 km	MPC · JPL
223343	2003 QH_{100}	—	August 28, 2003	Palomar	NEAT	·	4.5 km	MPC · JPL
223344	2003 QJ_{106}	—	August 31, 2003	Socorro	LINEAR	·	3.2 km	MPC · JPL
223345	2003 QP_{107}	—	August 31, 2003	Socorro	LINEAR	EOS	3.1 km	MPC · JPL
223346	2003 QX_{112}	—	August 27, 2003	Palomar	NEAT	·	4.8 km	MPC · JPL
223347	2003 QC_{113}	—	August 31, 2003	Socorro	LINEAR	·	5.7 km	MPC · JPL
223348	2003 RH_{9}	—	September 3, 2003	Kvistaberg	Uppsala-DLR Asteroid Survey	·	5.2 km	MPC · JPL
223349	2003 RP_{11}	—	September 15, 2003	Wrightwood	J. W. Young	·	5.1 km	MPC · JPL
223350	2003 RN_{15}	—	September 15, 2003	Palomar	NEAT	EOS	5.6 km	MPC · JPL
223351	2003 RQ_{17}	—	September 15, 2003	Palomar	NEAT	EOS	3.9 km	MPC · JPL
223352	2003 RS_{17}	—	September 15, 2003	Palomar	NEAT	EOS	3.1 km	MPC · JPL
223353	2003 RT_{19}	—	September 15, 2003	Anderson Mesa	LONEOS	·	6.1 km	MPC · JPL
223354	2003 RO_{21}	—	September 13, 2003	Haleakala	NEAT	·	5.3 km	MPC · JPL
223355	2003 RV_{21}	—	September 13, 2003	Haleakala	NEAT	EOS	3.3 km	MPC · JPL
223356	2003 RP_{23}	—	September 14, 2003	Palomar	NEAT	THM	3.9 km	MPC · JPL
223357	2003 RW_{25}	—	September 15, 2003	Palomar	NEAT	EUP	7.2 km	MPC · JPL
223358	2003 SJ	—	September 16, 2003	Palomar	NEAT	EOS	3.3 km	MPC · JPL
223359	2003 SE_{3}	—	September 16, 2003	Palomar	NEAT	·	5.5 km	MPC · JPL
223360 Švankmajer	2003 SV_{4}	Švankmajer	September 16, 2003	Kleť	KLENOT	·	3.5 km	MPC · JPL
223361	2003 SX_{6}	—	September 17, 2003	Palomar	NEAT	·	6.3 km	MPC · JPL
223362	2003 SJ_{7}	—	September 16, 2003	Kitt Peak	Spacewatch	·	4.1 km	MPC · JPL
223363	2003 SL_{8}	—	September 16, 2003	Kitt Peak	Spacewatch	·	3.2 km	MPC · JPL
223364	2003 SG_{17}	—	September 18, 2003	Campo Imperatore	CINEOS	·	5.2 km	MPC · JPL
223365	2003 SC_{20}	—	September 16, 2003	Kitt Peak	Spacewatch	·	5.1 km	MPC · JPL
223366	2003 SF_{22}	—	September 16, 2003	Palomar	NEAT	·	6.6 km	MPC · JPL
223367	2003 SK_{27}	—	September 18, 2003	Socorro	LINEAR	·	6.1 km	MPC · JPL
223368	2003 SP_{32}	—	September 16, 2003	Palomar	NEAT	·	5.5 km	MPC · JPL
223369	2003 SO_{39}	—	September 16, 2003	Palomar	NEAT	VER	4.0 km	MPC · JPL
223370	2003 SJ_{43}	—	September 16, 2003	Anderson Mesa	LONEOS	·	5.8 km	MPC · JPL
223371	2003 SN_{45}	—	September 16, 2003	Anderson Mesa	LONEOS	·	5.6 km	MPC · JPL
223372	2003 SS_{52}	—	September 19, 2003	Palomar	NEAT	·	2.9 km	MPC · JPL
223373	2003 SD_{54}	—	September 16, 2003	Kitt Peak	Spacewatch	VER	4.5 km	MPC · JPL
223374	2003 SK_{54}	—	September 16, 2003	Anderson Mesa	LONEOS	·	4.3 km	MPC · JPL
223375	2003 SA_{55}	—	September 16, 2003	Anderson Mesa	LONEOS	LIX	5.3 km	MPC · JPL
223376	2003 SL_{55}	—	September 16, 2003	Anderson Mesa	LONEOS	·	6.2 km	MPC · JPL
223377	2003 SB_{57}	—	September 16, 2003	Kitt Peak	Spacewatch	VER	5.3 km	MPC · JPL
223378	2003 SR_{58}	—	September 17, 2003	Anderson Mesa	LONEOS	·	5.9 km	MPC · JPL
223379	2003 SV_{58}	—	September 17, 2003	Anderson Mesa	LONEOS	VER	5.3 km	MPC · JPL
223380	2003 SL_{60}	—	September 17, 2003	Kitt Peak	Spacewatch	·	5.1 km	MPC · JPL
223381	2003 SO_{62}	—	September 17, 2003	Kitt Peak	Spacewatch	·	5.4 km	MPC · JPL
223382	2003 SE_{65}	—	September 18, 2003	Anderson Mesa	LONEOS	·	6.0 km	MPC · JPL
223383	2003 SP_{70}	—	September 17, 2003	Haleakala	NEAT	·	7.4 km	MPC · JPL
223384	2003 SJ_{72}	—	September 18, 2003	Kitt Peak	Spacewatch	·	5.2 km	MPC · JPL
223385	2003 SV_{73}	—	September 18, 2003	Kitt Peak	Spacewatch	·	4.8 km	MPC · JPL
223386	2003 SP_{77}	—	September 19, 2003	Kitt Peak	Spacewatch	·	5.6 km	MPC · JPL
223387	2003 SG_{85}	—	September 16, 2003	Palomar	NEAT	H	770 m	MPC · JPL
223388	2003 SV_{85}	—	September 16, 2003	Kitt Peak	Spacewatch	·	4.8 km	MPC · JPL
223389	2003 SG_{88}	—	September 18, 2003	Campo Imperatore	CINEOS	THM	2.6 km	MPC · JPL
223390	2003 SA_{91}	—	September 18, 2003	Kitt Peak	Spacewatch	·	3.8 km	MPC · JPL
223391	2003 SB_{92}	—	September 18, 2003	Palomar	NEAT	HYG	3.4 km	MPC · JPL
223392	2003 SU_{94}	—	September 19, 2003	Kitt Peak	Spacewatch	·	4.4 km	MPC · JPL
223393	2003 SD_{106}	—	September 20, 2003	Palomar	NEAT	EOS	3.8 km	MPC · JPL
223394	2003 SM_{106}	—	September 20, 2003	Kitt Peak	Spacewatch	·	6.8 km	MPC · JPL
223395	2003 SW_{115}	—	September 16, 2003	Anderson Mesa	LONEOS	·	4.9 km	MPC · JPL
223396	2003 SB_{117}	—	September 16, 2003	Palomar	NEAT	EOS	3.6 km	MPC · JPL
223397	2003 SE_{118}	—	September 16, 2003	Kitt Peak	Spacewatch	·	7.4 km	MPC · JPL
223398	2003 SO_{121}	—	September 17, 2003	Kitt Peak	Spacewatch	VER	3.2 km	MPC · JPL
223399	2003 SQ_{121}	—	September 17, 2003	Kitt Peak	Spacewatch	·	4.7 km	MPC · JPL
223400	2003 SS_{123}	—	September 18, 2003	Kitt Peak	Spacewatch	slow	5.3 km	MPC · JPL

== 223401–223500 ==
back to top

Designation			Discovery			Properties		Ref
Permanent	Provisional	Named after	Date	Site	Discoverer(s)	Category	Diam.	Ref
223401	2003 SF_{125}	—	September 19, 2003	Palomar	NEAT	·	6.6 km	MPC · JPL
223402	2003 SN_{130}	—	September 20, 2003	Socorro	LINEAR	·	5.4 km	MPC · JPL
223403	2003 SU_{143}	—	September 21, 2003	Socorro	LINEAR	·	4.4 km	MPC · JPL
223404	2003 SU_{148}	—	September 16, 2003	Kitt Peak	Spacewatch	·	4.9 km	MPC · JPL
223405	2003 SK_{155}	—	September 19, 2003	Anderson Mesa	LONEOS	·	3.6 km	MPC · JPL
223406	2003 SY_{157}	—	September 20, 2003	Socorro	LINEAR	HYG	3.1 km	MPC · JPL
223407	2003 SF_{160}	—	September 21, 2003	Kitt Peak	Spacewatch	KOR	2.3 km	MPC · JPL
223408	2003 SS_{160}	—	September 16, 2003	Anderson Mesa	LONEOS	·	3.8 km	MPC · JPL
223409	2003 SV_{169}	—	September 23, 2003	Haleakala	NEAT	HYG	3.1 km	MPC · JPL
223410	2003 SK_{177}	—	September 18, 2003	Palomar	NEAT	THM	2.7 km	MPC · JPL
223411	2003 SL_{182}	—	September 20, 2003	Kitt Peak	Spacewatch	EOS	3.0 km	MPC · JPL
223412	2003 SK_{183}	—	September 21, 2003	Kitt Peak	Spacewatch	EOS ·	6.1 km	MPC · JPL
223413	2003 SP_{184}	—	September 21, 2003	Kitt Peak	Spacewatch	·	4.8 km	MPC · JPL
223414	2003 SV_{184}	—	September 21, 2003	Kitt Peak	Spacewatch	·	3.9 km	MPC · JPL
223415	2003 SF_{197}	—	September 21, 2003	Anderson Mesa	LONEOS	·	6.3 km	MPC · JPL
223416	2003 SL_{203}	—	September 22, 2003	Anderson Mesa	LONEOS	THM	3.3 km	MPC · JPL
223417	2003 SB_{206}	—	September 23, 2003	Palomar	NEAT	·	3.8 km	MPC · JPL
223418	2003 SW_{210}	—	September 23, 2003	Palomar	NEAT	·	5.6 km	MPC · JPL
223419	2003 SE_{212}	—	September 25, 2003	Palomar	NEAT	·	5.0 km	MPC · JPL
223420	2003 SH_{213}	—	September 26, 2003	Palomar	NEAT	·	6.8 km	MPC · JPL
223421	2003 SJ_{218}	—	September 28, 2003	Desert Eagle	W. K. Y. Yeung	·	3.3 km	MPC · JPL
223422	2003 SZ_{231}	—	September 24, 2003	Haleakala	NEAT	·	4.4 km	MPC · JPL
223423	2003 SD_{246}	—	September 26, 2003	Socorro	LINEAR	·	3.1 km	MPC · JPL
223424	2003 SY_{250}	—	September 26, 2003	Socorro	LINEAR	CYB	6.8 km	MPC · JPL
223425	2003 SJ_{253}	—	September 27, 2003	Kitt Peak	Spacewatch	·	3.2 km	MPC · JPL
223426	2003 SJ_{257}	—	September 28, 2003	Socorro	LINEAR	·	4.5 km	MPC · JPL
223427	2003 SK_{257}	—	September 28, 2003	Socorro	LINEAR	KOR	1.9 km	MPC · JPL
223428	2003 SC_{260}	—	September 29, 2003	Socorro	LINEAR	HYG	4.6 km	MPC · JPL
223429	2003 SO_{260}	—	September 27, 2003	Kitt Peak	Spacewatch	·	3.3 km	MPC · JPL
223430	2003 SV_{265}	—	September 29, 2003	Kitt Peak	Spacewatch	·	3.6 km	MPC · JPL
223431	2003 SB_{274}	—	September 28, 2003	Socorro	LINEAR	T_{j} (2.97)	5.5 km	MPC · JPL
223432	2003 SA_{277}	—	September 30, 2003	Socorro	LINEAR	LIX	6.1 km	MPC · JPL
223433	2003 SN_{277}	—	September 30, 2003	Socorro	LINEAR	·	5.1 km	MPC · JPL
223434	2003 SQ_{279}	—	September 17, 2003	Kitt Peak	Spacewatch	·	4.7 km	MPC · JPL
223435	2003 SO_{281}	—	September 19, 2003	Kitt Peak	Spacewatch	EOS	2.7 km	MPC · JPL
223436	2003 SD_{283}	—	September 20, 2003	Socorro	LINEAR	URS	5.7 km	MPC · JPL
223437	2003 SX_{283}	—	September 20, 2003	Socorro	LINEAR	·	5.1 km	MPC · JPL
223438	2003 SD_{285}	—	September 20, 2003	Kitt Peak	Spacewatch	URS	4.7 km	MPC · JPL
223439	2003 SU_{285}	—	September 20, 2003	Kitt Peak	Spacewatch	·	4.2 km	MPC · JPL
223440	2003 SF_{293}	—	September 27, 2003	Socorro	LINEAR	·	4.2 km	MPC · JPL
223441	2003 SP_{295}	—	September 29, 2003	Anderson Mesa	LONEOS	LIX	6.7 km	MPC · JPL
223442	2003 SH_{297}	—	September 18, 2003	Haleakala	NEAT	·	3.5 km	MPC · JPL
223443	2003 ST_{299}	—	September 16, 2003	Anderson Mesa	LONEOS	·	4.9 km	MPC · JPL
223444	2003 SH_{308}	—	September 28, 2003	Socorro	LINEAR	·	5.6 km	MPC · JPL
223445	2003 SF_{309}	—	September 27, 2003	Socorro	LINEAR	HYG	3.9 km	MPC · JPL
223446	2003 SW_{311}	—	September 29, 2003	Kitt Peak	Spacewatch	HYG	3.9 km	MPC · JPL
223447	2003 SU_{330}	—	September 26, 2003	Apache Point	SDSS	·	3.1 km	MPC · JPL
223448	2003 SQ_{341}	—	September 17, 2003	Anderson Mesa	LONEOS	·	2.9 km	MPC · JPL
223449	2003 TU_{12}	—	October 15, 2003	Palomar	NEAT	·	6.4 km	MPC · JPL
223450	2003 TD_{15}	—	October 15, 2003	Anderson Mesa	LONEOS	·	3.7 km	MPC · JPL
223451	2003 TP_{19}	—	October 15, 2003	Palomar	NEAT	THM	3.7 km	MPC · JPL
223452	2003 TK_{21}	—	October 15, 2003	Anderson Mesa	LONEOS	(69559)	7.7 km	MPC · JPL
223453	2003 TJ_{33}	—	October 1, 2003	Kitt Peak	Spacewatch	·	5.0 km	MPC · JPL
223454	2003 UW	—	October 16, 2003	Kitt Peak	Spacewatch	·	3.3 km	MPC · JPL
223455	2003 UT_{7}	—	October 18, 2003	Kitt Peak	Spacewatch	·	2.8 km	MPC · JPL
223456	2003 UB_{10}	—	October 20, 2003	Kitt Peak	Spacewatch	AMO +1km	780 m	MPC · JPL
223457	2003 UD_{43}	—	October 17, 2003	Kitt Peak	Spacewatch	·	5.5 km	MPC · JPL
223458	2003 UB_{54}	—	October 18, 2003	Palomar	NEAT	·	5.4 km	MPC · JPL
223459	2003 UG_{65}	—	October 16, 2003	Palomar	NEAT	T_{j} (2.99) · EUP	6.4 km	MPC · JPL
223460	2003 UD_{81}	—	October 16, 2003	Anderson Mesa	LONEOS	T_{j} (2.98) · EUP	4.6 km	MPC · JPL
223461	2003 UU_{93}	—	October 18, 2003	Kitt Peak	Spacewatch	THB	4.6 km	MPC · JPL
223462	2003 UK_{96}	—	October 18, 2003	Haleakala	NEAT	·	6.7 km	MPC · JPL
223463	2003 UU_{96}	—	October 19, 2003	Anderson Mesa	LONEOS	·	8.2 km	MPC · JPL
223464	2003 UY_{101}	—	October 20, 2003	Socorro	LINEAR	·	4.7 km	MPC · JPL
223465	2003 UL_{110}	—	October 19, 2003	Kitt Peak	Spacewatch	·	4.7 km	MPC · JPL
223466	2003 UE_{133}	—	October 20, 2003	Palomar	NEAT	SYL · CYB	5.5 km	MPC · JPL
223467	2003 UR_{137}	—	October 21, 2003	Socorro	LINEAR	·	6.6 km	MPC · JPL
223468	2003 UH_{153}	—	October 21, 2003	Kitt Peak	Spacewatch	·	5.2 km	MPC · JPL
223469	2003 UB_{208}	—	October 22, 2003	Kitt Peak	Spacewatch	·	4.7 km	MPC · JPL
223470	2003 UM_{241}	—	October 24, 2003	Socorro	LINEAR	·	5.7 km	MPC · JPL
223471	2003 UA_{251}	—	October 25, 2003	Socorro	LINEAR	·	4.4 km	MPC · JPL
223472	2003 UW_{270}	—	October 17, 2003	Palomar	NEAT	·	4.8 km	MPC · JPL
223473	2003 UT_{277}	—	October 25, 2003	Socorro	LINEAR	ELF	6.5 km	MPC · JPL
223474	2003 UF_{375}	—	October 22, 2003	Apache Point	SDSS	·	2.4 km	MPC · JPL
223475	2003 VY_{3}	—	November 14, 2003	Palomar	NEAT	LUT	7.2 km	MPC · JPL
223476	2003 WN_{56}	—	November 20, 2003	Kitt Peak	Spacewatch	·	1.2 km	MPC · JPL
223477	2003 WX_{62}	—	November 19, 2003	Kitt Peak	Spacewatch	CYB	6.4 km	MPC · JPL
223478	2003 WT_{139}	—	November 21, 2003	Socorro	LINEAR	·	1.1 km	MPC · JPL
223479	2003 WL_{154}	—	November 26, 2003	Kitt Peak	Spacewatch	SYL · CYB	7.5 km	MPC · JPL
223480	2003 XV_{38}	—	December 4, 2003	Socorro	LINEAR	LIX	5.5 km	MPC · JPL
223481	2003 YM_{27}	—	December 17, 2003	Črni Vrh	Mikuž, H.	T_{j} (2.98)	6.9 km	MPC · JPL
223482	2003 YL_{32}	—	December 18, 2003	Catalina	CSS	HIL · 3:2	7.4 km	MPC · JPL
223483	2003 YF_{36}	—	December 18, 2003	Socorro	LINEAR	·	1.1 km	MPC · JPL
223484	2003 YQ_{61}	—	December 19, 2003	Socorro	LINEAR	·	1.4 km	MPC · JPL
223485	2003 YE_{82}	—	December 18, 2003	Socorro	LINEAR	·	1.1 km	MPC · JPL
223486	2003 YM_{88}	—	December 19, 2003	Socorro	LINEAR	·	1.0 km	MPC · JPL
223487	2003 YT_{111}	—	December 23, 2003	Socorro	LINEAR	·	1.0 km	MPC · JPL
223488	2003 YN_{145}	—	December 28, 2003	Socorro	LINEAR	·	960 m	MPC · JPL
223489	2003 YV_{170}	—	December 18, 2003	Socorro	LINEAR	·	1.0 km	MPC · JPL
223490	2003 YN_{180}	—	December 23, 2003	Socorro	LINEAR	·	1.8 km	MPC · JPL
223491	2004 BY_{11}	—	January 16, 2004	Palomar	NEAT	·	860 m	MPC · JPL
223492	2004 BV_{28}	—	January 18, 2004	Palomar	NEAT	3:2	6.6 km	MPC · JPL
223493	2004 BH_{43}	—	January 22, 2004	Socorro	LINEAR	·	1.5 km	MPC · JPL
223494	2004 BT_{43}	—	January 22, 2004	Socorro	LINEAR	·	1.1 km	MPC · JPL
223495	2004 BV_{43}	—	January 22, 2004	Socorro	LINEAR	·	1.0 km	MPC · JPL
223496	2004 BS_{52}	—	January 21, 2004	Socorro	LINEAR	·	650 m	MPC · JPL
223497	2004 BM_{81}	—	January 26, 2004	Anderson Mesa	LONEOS	·	1.2 km	MPC · JPL
223498	2004 BV_{91}	—	January 26, 2004	Anderson Mesa	LONEOS	·	1.2 km	MPC · JPL
223499	2004 BS_{93}	—	January 28, 2004	Socorro	LINEAR	PHO	3.4 km	MPC · JPL
223500	2004 BW_{99}	—	January 27, 2004	Kitt Peak	Spacewatch	·	1.1 km	MPC · JPL

== 223501–223600 ==
back to top

Designation			Discovery			Properties		Ref
Permanent	Provisional	Named after	Date	Site	Discoverer(s)	Category	Diam.	Ref
223501	2004 BM_{106}	—	January 26, 2004	Anderson Mesa	LONEOS	·	1.0 km	MPC · JPL
223502	2004 BY_{107}	—	January 28, 2004	Catalina	CSS	·	840 m	MPC · JPL
223503	2004 BM_{108}	—	January 28, 2004	Catalina	CSS	·	1.2 km	MPC · JPL
223504	2004 BK_{115}	—	January 30, 2004	Socorro	LINEAR	·	2.7 km	MPC · JPL
223505	2004 BB_{118}	—	January 29, 2004	Socorro	LINEAR	·	1.3 km	MPC · JPL
223506	2004 BZ_{131}	—	January 16, 2004	Kitt Peak	Spacewatch	·	1.3 km	MPC · JPL
223507	2004 CL_{19}	—	February 11, 2004	Kitt Peak	Spacewatch	·	970 m	MPC · JPL
223508	2004 CS_{19}	—	February 11, 2004	Kitt Peak	Spacewatch	·	750 m	MPC · JPL
223509	2004 CX_{21}	—	February 11, 2004	Palomar	NEAT	·	1.1 km	MPC · JPL
223510	2004 CC_{22}	—	February 11, 2004	Catalina	CSS	·	1.3 km	MPC · JPL
223511	2004 CE_{38}	—	February 13, 2004	Desert Eagle	W. K. Y. Yeung	·	1.2 km	MPC · JPL
223512	2004 CA_{43}	—	February 11, 2004	Palomar	NEAT	·	1.2 km	MPC · JPL
223513	2004 CJ_{45}	—	February 13, 2004	Kitt Peak	Spacewatch	·	810 m	MPC · JPL
223514	2004 CM_{46}	—	February 13, 2004	Desert Eagle	W. K. Y. Yeung	·	1.3 km	MPC · JPL
223515	2004 CU_{58}	—	February 10, 2004	Palomar	NEAT	·	1.5 km	MPC · JPL
223516	2004 CU_{61}	—	February 11, 2004	Kitt Peak	Spacewatch	·	1.3 km	MPC · JPL
223517	2004 CF_{80}	—	February 11, 2004	Palomar	NEAT	(2076)	1.6 km	MPC · JPL
223518	2004 CK_{97}	—	February 13, 2004	Palomar	NEAT	·	1.6 km	MPC · JPL
223519	2004 CZ_{98}	—	February 14, 2004	Catalina	CSS	·	1.3 km	MPC · JPL
223520	2004 CF_{100}	—	February 15, 2004	Catalina	CSS	·	1.3 km	MPC · JPL
223521	2004 CZ_{100}	—	February 15, 2004	Catalina	CSS	·	1.4 km	MPC · JPL
223522	2004 CH_{113}	—	February 13, 2004	Anderson Mesa	LONEOS	·	1.3 km	MPC · JPL
223523	2004 DX_{11}	—	February 17, 2004	Kitt Peak	Spacewatch	·	1.5 km	MPC · JPL
223524	2004 DF_{24}	—	February 19, 2004	Socorro	LINEAR	·	3.0 km	MPC · JPL
223525	2004 DB_{25}	—	February 18, 2004	Socorro	LINEAR	PHO	3.7 km	MPC · JPL
223526	2004 DX_{26}	—	February 16, 2004	Kitt Peak	Spacewatch	·	1.4 km	MPC · JPL
223527	2004 DS_{38}	—	February 21, 2004	Sandlot	Sandlot	·	1.7 km	MPC · JPL
223528	2004 DO_{41}	—	February 18, 2004	Haleakala	NEAT	·	1.6 km	MPC · JPL
223529	2004 DK_{42}	—	February 19, 2004	Socorro	LINEAR	·	1.3 km	MPC · JPL
223530	2004 DP_{43}	—	February 23, 2004	Socorro	LINEAR	NYS	1.3 km	MPC · JPL
223531	2004 DH_{55}	—	February 22, 2004	Kitt Peak	Spacewatch	MAS	800 m	MPC · JPL
223532	2004 EH_{5}	—	March 11, 2004	Palomar	NEAT	V	1.1 km	MPC · JPL
223533	2004 EH_{8}	—	March 13, 2004	Palomar	NEAT	·	1.8 km	MPC · JPL
223534	2004 EV_{11}	—	March 11, 2004	Palomar	NEAT	·	1.2 km	MPC · JPL
223535	2004 EK_{15}	—	March 11, 2004	Palomar	NEAT	·	1.7 km	MPC · JPL
223536	2004 EP_{16}	—	March 12, 2004	Palomar	NEAT	·	2.0 km	MPC · JPL
223537	2004 EA_{19}	—	March 14, 2004	Catalina	CSS	·	3.6 km	MPC · JPL
223538	2004 ER_{22}	—	March 15, 2004	Desert Eagle	W. K. Y. Yeung	·	3.1 km	MPC · JPL
223539	2004 EX_{25}	—	March 13, 2004	Palomar	NEAT	·	1.6 km	MPC · JPL
223540	2004 ES_{30}	—	March 15, 2004	Catalina	CSS	NYS	1.5 km	MPC · JPL
223541	2004 ER_{40}	—	March 15, 2004	Kitt Peak	Spacewatch	NYS	1.5 km	MPC · JPL
223542	2004 EK_{42}	—	March 15, 2004	Catalina	CSS	NYS	2.5 km	MPC · JPL
223543	2004 EV_{42}	—	March 15, 2004	Catalina	CSS	NYS	1.7 km	MPC · JPL
223544	2004 EJ_{46}	—	March 15, 2004	Socorro	LINEAR	·	1.6 km	MPC · JPL
223545	2004 EA_{60}	—	March 15, 2004	Palomar	NEAT	·	1.3 km	MPC · JPL
223546	2004 EN_{63}	—	March 13, 2004	Palomar	NEAT	·	850 m	MPC · JPL
223547	2004 EH_{68}	—	March 15, 2004	Socorro	LINEAR	·	1.0 km	MPC · JPL
223548	2004 EM_{71}	—	March 15, 2004	Catalina	CSS	MAS	990 m	MPC · JPL
223549	2004 EL_{73}	—	March 15, 2004	Catalina	CSS	·	880 m	MPC · JPL
223550	2004 EM_{73}	—	March 15, 2004	Catalina	CSS	NYS	1.5 km	MPC · JPL
223551	2004 ES_{73}	—	March 15, 2004	Catalina	CSS	MAS	960 m	MPC · JPL
223552	2004 EJ_{76}	—	March 15, 2004	Kitt Peak	Spacewatch	·	1.3 km	MPC · JPL
223553	2004 EB_{77}	—	March 15, 2004	Catalina	CSS	MAS	990 m	MPC · JPL
223554	2004 EN_{84}	—	March 15, 2004	Catalina	CSS	·	1.3 km	MPC · JPL
223555	2004 EW_{84}	—	March 15, 2004	Catalina	CSS	NYS	1.4 km	MPC · JPL
223556	2004 ES_{86}	—	March 15, 2004	Kitt Peak	Spacewatch	·	1.5 km	MPC · JPL
223557	2004 EL_{90}	—	March 14, 2004	Kitt Peak	Spacewatch	·	1.1 km	MPC · JPL
223558	2004 EP_{93}	—	March 15, 2004	Catalina	CSS	·	1.8 km	MPC · JPL
223559	2004 ED_{100}	—	March 15, 2004	Kitt Peak	Spacewatch	·	850 m	MPC · JPL
223560	2004 ET_{106}	—	March 15, 2004	Kitt Peak	Spacewatch	·	1.4 km	MPC · JPL
223561	2004 EN_{114}	—	March 11, 2004	Palomar	NEAT	·	1.6 km	MPC · JPL
223562	2004 EB_{116}	—	March 14, 2004	Kitt Peak	Spacewatch	V	950 m	MPC · JPL
223563	2004 FJ_{2}	—	March 16, 2004	Socorro	LINEAR	·	1.6 km	MPC · JPL
223564	2004 FD_{7}	—	March 16, 2004	Kitt Peak	Spacewatch	·	930 m	MPC · JPL
223565	2004 FD_{15}	—	March 16, 2004	Kitt Peak	Spacewatch	·	2.3 km	MPC · JPL
223566 Petignat	2004 FL_{17}	Petignat	March 22, 2004	Vicques	M. Ory	·	950 m	MPC · JPL
223567	2004 FL_{21}	—	March 16, 2004	Kitt Peak	Spacewatch	·	950 m	MPC · JPL
223568	2004 FE_{22}	—	March 16, 2004	Catalina	CSS	·	2.2 km	MPC · JPL
223569	2004 FP_{27}	—	March 17, 2004	Kitt Peak	Spacewatch	·	1.3 km	MPC · JPL
223570	2004 FO_{35}	—	March 16, 2004	Socorro	LINEAR	·	960 m	MPC · JPL
223571	2004 FS_{37}	—	March 17, 2004	Kitt Peak	Spacewatch	·	1.9 km	MPC · JPL
223572	2004 FU_{38}	—	March 17, 2004	Socorro	LINEAR	·	2.4 km	MPC · JPL
223573	2004 FK_{40}	—	March 18, 2004	Socorro	LINEAR	NYS	1.5 km	MPC · JPL
223574	2004 FA_{53}	—	March 19, 2004	Socorro	LINEAR	·	1.3 km	MPC · JPL
223575	2004 FZ_{55}	—	March 20, 2004	Socorro	LINEAR	·	1.7 km	MPC · JPL
223576	2004 FV_{61}	—	March 19, 2004	Socorro	LINEAR	·	1.4 km	MPC · JPL
223577	2004 FE_{64}	—	March 19, 2004	Socorro	LINEAR	V	1.0 km	MPC · JPL
223578	2004 FU_{76}	—	March 18, 2004	Socorro	LINEAR	·	1.6 km	MPC · JPL
223579	2004 FM_{77}	—	March 18, 2004	Socorro	LINEAR	·	1.3 km	MPC · JPL
223580	2004 FD_{83}	—	March 17, 2004	Socorro	LINEAR	MAS	1.2 km	MPC · JPL
223581	2004 FF_{99}	—	March 20, 2004	Socorro	LINEAR	V	930 m	MPC · JPL
223582	2004 FQ_{105}	—	March 25, 2004	Socorro	LINEAR	·	1.1 km	MPC · JPL
223583	2004 FO_{107}	—	March 20, 2004	Socorro	LINEAR	·	1.3 km	MPC · JPL
223584	2004 FY_{107}	—	March 23, 2004	Kitt Peak	Spacewatch	·	2.0 km	MPC · JPL
223585	2004 FA_{110}	—	March 24, 2004	Anderson Mesa	LONEOS	·	2.8 km	MPC · JPL
223586	2004 FW_{118}	—	March 22, 2004	Socorro	LINEAR	·	1.9 km	MPC · JPL
223587	2004 FW_{140}	—	March 27, 2004	Socorro	LINEAR	MAS	780 m	MPC · JPL
223588	2004 FH_{141}	—	March 27, 2004	Socorro	LINEAR	·	1.6 km	MPC · JPL
223589	2004 FO_{161}	—	March 18, 2004	Kitt Peak	Spacewatch	·	1.1 km	MPC · JPL
223590	2004 GK_{3}	—	April 9, 2004	Siding Spring	SSS	·	1.9 km	MPC · JPL
223591	2004 GA_{20}	—	April 15, 2004	Desert Eagle	W. K. Y. Yeung	NYS	1.5 km	MPC · JPL
223592	2004 GT_{20}	—	April 10, 2004	Palomar	NEAT	(1547)	2.8 km	MPC · JPL
223593	2004 GJ_{29}	—	April 12, 2004	Anderson Mesa	LONEOS	·	920 m	MPC · JPL
223594	2004 GW_{32}	—	April 12, 2004	Palomar	NEAT	V	860 m	MPC · JPL
223595	2004 GG_{36}	—	April 13, 2004	Palomar	NEAT	·	1.6 km	MPC · JPL
223596	2004 GK_{48}	—	April 12, 2004	Kitt Peak	Spacewatch	·	1.0 km	MPC · JPL
223597	2004 GC_{50}	—	April 12, 2004	Kitt Peak	Spacewatch	·	2.0 km	MPC · JPL
223598	2004 GO_{50}	—	April 12, 2004	Kitt Peak	Spacewatch	·	1.4 km	MPC · JPL
223599	2004 GA_{61}	—	April 15, 2004	Anderson Mesa	LONEOS	·	1.2 km	MPC · JPL
223600	2004 GF_{75}	—	April 14, 2004	Anderson Mesa	LONEOS	·	1.4 km	MPC · JPL

== 223601–223700 ==
back to top

Designation			Discovery			Properties		Ref
Permanent	Provisional	Named after	Date	Site	Discoverer(s)	Category	Diam.	Ref
223601	2004 GY_{78}	—	April 11, 2004	Palomar	NEAT	fast	900 m	MPC · JPL
223602	2004 GK_{84}	—	April 14, 2004	Kitt Peak	Spacewatch	MAS	900 m	MPC · JPL
223603	2004 GB_{85}	—	April 14, 2004	Kitt Peak	Spacewatch	·	1.6 km	MPC · JPL
223604	2004 HN_{2}	—	April 16, 2004	Palomar	NEAT	·	1.8 km	MPC · JPL
223605	2004 HF_{8}	—	April 16, 2004	Kitt Peak	Spacewatch	NYS	1.3 km	MPC · JPL
223606	2004 HT_{8}	—	April 16, 2004	Socorro	LINEAR	·	1.6 km	MPC · JPL
223607	2004 HT_{18}	—	April 19, 2004	Kitt Peak	Spacewatch	·	1.4 km	MPC · JPL
223608	2004 HK_{19}	—	April 19, 2004	Socorro	LINEAR	·	4.1 km	MPC · JPL
223609	2004 HF_{26}	—	April 19, 2004	Socorro	LINEAR	·	1.5 km	MPC · JPL
223610	2004 HQ_{39}	—	April 19, 2004	Kitt Peak	Spacewatch	·	2.2 km	MPC · JPL
223611	2004 HJ_{54}	—	April 17, 2004	Socorro	LINEAR	·	2.2 km	MPC · JPL
223612	2004 HE_{60}	—	April 25, 2004	Socorro	LINEAR	·	1.9 km	MPC · JPL
223613	2004 HT_{65}	—	April 19, 2004	Kitt Peak	Spacewatch	·	990 m	MPC · JPL
223614	2004 HZ_{71}	—	April 25, 2004	Kitt Peak	Spacewatch	·	1.1 km	MPC · JPL
223615	2004 HP_{72}	—	April 28, 2004	Kitt Peak	Spacewatch	L4	10 km	MPC · JPL
223616	2004 JR_{2}	—	May 8, 2004	Palomar	NEAT	·	2.7 km	MPC · JPL
223617	2004 JE_{6}	—	May 12, 2004	Catalina	CSS	·	2.3 km	MPC · JPL
223618	2004 JZ_{10}	—	May 12, 2004	Catalina	CSS	BRG	2.0 km	MPC · JPL
223619	2004 JR_{11}	—	May 13, 2004	Kitt Peak	Spacewatch	(1547)	2.1 km	MPC · JPL
223620	2004 JX_{12}	—	May 13, 2004	Reedy Creek	J. Broughton	(5)	2.1 km	MPC · JPL
223621	2004 JK_{15}	—	May 10, 2004	Palomar	NEAT	·	1.8 km	MPC · JPL
223622	2004 JX_{15}	—	May 10, 2004	Palomar	NEAT	ADE	4.1 km	MPC · JPL
223623	2004 JZ_{19}	—	May 14, 2004	Kitt Peak	Spacewatch	·	2.1 km	MPC · JPL
223624	2004 JQ_{20}	—	May 13, 2004	Socorro	LINEAR	·	3.1 km	MPC · JPL
223625	2004 JM_{21}	—	May 9, 2004	Kitt Peak	Spacewatch	NYS	2.0 km	MPC · JPL
223626	2004 JT_{23}	—	May 14, 2004	Socorro	LINEAR	PHO	1.5 km	MPC · JPL
223627	2004 JF_{29}	—	May 15, 2004	Socorro	LINEAR	·	1.8 km	MPC · JPL
223628	2004 JF_{30}	—	May 15, 2004	Socorro	LINEAR	·	2.5 km	MPC · JPL
223629	2004 JH_{33}	—	May 15, 2004	Socorro	LINEAR	·	1.7 km	MPC · JPL
223630	2004 JY_{33}	—	May 15, 2004	Socorro	LINEAR	·	1.6 km	MPC · JPL
223631	2004 JJ_{54}	—	May 9, 2004	Kitt Peak	Spacewatch	L4	11 km	MPC · JPL
223632	2004 JD_{56}	—	May 14, 2004	Palomar	NEAT	·	2.1 km	MPC · JPL
223633 Rosnyaîné	2004 KJ_{1}	Rosnyaîné	May 17, 2004	Saint-Sulpice	B. Christophe	·	2.4 km	MPC · JPL
223634	2004 KV_{4}	—	May 18, 2004	Socorro	LINEAR	·	2.0 km	MPC · JPL
223635	2004 KW_{9}	—	May 19, 2004	Socorro	LINEAR	·	2.3 km	MPC · JPL
223636	2004 KZ_{11}	—	May 21, 2004	Kitt Peak	Spacewatch	PHO	1.4 km	MPC · JPL
223637	2004 KE_{14}	—	May 22, 2004	Catalina	CSS	·	1.5 km	MPC · JPL
223638	2004 KS_{15}	—	May 21, 2004	Socorro	LINEAR	V	910 m	MPC · JPL
223639	2004 KM_{16}	—	May 27, 2004	Nogales	Tenagra II	ADE	1.9 km	MPC · JPL
223640	2004 LJ_{6}	—	June 9, 2004	Siding Spring	SSS	·	2.5 km	MPC · JPL
223641	2004 LA_{16}	—	June 12, 2004	Socorro	LINEAR	JUN	2.0 km	MPC · JPL
223642	2004 LZ_{18}	—	June 11, 2004	Kitt Peak	Spacewatch	·	1.4 km	MPC · JPL
223643	2004 LX_{29}	—	June 14, 2004	Kitt Peak	Spacewatch	·	2.3 km	MPC · JPL
223644	2004 MG	—	June 16, 2004	Socorro	LINEAR	·	3.1 km	MPC · JPL
223645	2004 ML_{1}	—	June 17, 2004	Palomar	NEAT	·	1.6 km	MPC · JPL
223646	2004 ME_{4}	—	June 16, 2004	Socorro	LINEAR	·	2.0 km	MPC · JPL
223647	2004 MK_{7}	—	June 27, 2004	Reedy Creek	J. Broughton	·	2.9 km	MPC · JPL
223648	2004 NQ	—	July 10, 2004	Pla D'Arguines	D'Arguines, Pla	·	2.6 km	MPC · JPL
223649	2004 NW_{8}	—	July 14, 2004	Reedy Creek	J. Broughton	(5)	2.2 km	MPC · JPL
223650	2004 NF_{10}	—	July 9, 2004	Socorro	LINEAR	ADE	3.0 km	MPC · JPL
223651	2004 OZ_{2}	—	July 16, 2004	Socorro	LINEAR	(13314)	2.7 km	MPC · JPL
223652	2004 OQ_{14}	—	July 19, 2004	Anderson Mesa	LONEOS	·	2.4 km	MPC · JPL
223653	2004 PF	—	August 5, 2004	Palomar	NEAT	·	3.0 km	MPC · JPL
223654	2004 PF_{13}	—	August 7, 2004	Palomar	NEAT	·	2.8 km	MPC · JPL
223655	2004 PX_{16}	—	August 7, 2004	Campo Imperatore	CINEOS	·	2.4 km	MPC · JPL
223656	2004 PZ_{17}	—	August 8, 2004	Socorro	LINEAR	·	4.5 km	MPC · JPL
223657	2004 PL_{20}	—	August 3, 2004	Siding Spring	SSS	·	2.3 km	MPC · JPL
223658	2004 PX_{22}	—	August 8, 2004	Socorro	LINEAR	(13314)	3.4 km	MPC · JPL
223659	2004 PM_{26}	—	August 8, 2004	Bergisch Gladbach	W. Bickel	AEO	2.1 km	MPC · JPL
223660	2004 PW_{28}	—	August 6, 2004	Palomar	NEAT	·	2.9 km	MPC · JPL
223661	2004 PW_{32}	—	August 8, 2004	Socorro	LINEAR	MRX	1.6 km	MPC · JPL
223662	2004 PS_{36}	—	August 9, 2004	Socorro	LINEAR	·	2.8 km	MPC · JPL
223663	2004 PY_{36}	—	August 9, 2004	Socorro	LINEAR	·	3.2 km	MPC · JPL
223664	2004 PE_{37}	—	August 9, 2004	Socorro	LINEAR	·	3.0 km	MPC · JPL
223665	2004 PH_{37}	—	August 9, 2004	Socorro	LINEAR	EUN · slow	5.0 km	MPC · JPL
223666	2004 PN_{38}	—	August 9, 2004	Socorro	LINEAR	·	3.3 km	MPC · JPL
223667	2004 PW_{43}	—	August 6, 2004	Palomar	NEAT	NEM	3.3 km	MPC · JPL
223668	2004 PB_{48}	—	August 8, 2004	Socorro	LINEAR	·	2.1 km	MPC · JPL
223669	2004 PO_{53}	—	August 8, 2004	Socorro	LINEAR	·	3.2 km	MPC · JPL
223670	2004 PL_{59}	—	August 9, 2004	Anderson Mesa	LONEOS	·	2.8 km	MPC · JPL
223671	2004 PU_{59}	—	August 9, 2004	Anderson Mesa	LONEOS	·	2.3 km	MPC · JPL
223672	2004 PZ_{60}	—	August 9, 2004	Socorro	LINEAR	GEF	1.8 km	MPC · JPL
223673	2004 PJ_{70}	—	August 7, 2004	Campo Imperatore	CINEOS	·	2.4 km	MPC · JPL
223674	2004 PW_{74}	—	August 8, 2004	Anderson Mesa	LONEOS	·	2.9 km	MPC · JPL
223675	2004 PD_{79}	—	August 9, 2004	Socorro	LINEAR	PAD	3.4 km	MPC · JPL
223676	2004 PE_{81}	—	August 10, 2004	Socorro	LINEAR	·	2.6 km	MPC · JPL
223677	2004 PL_{81}	—	August 10, 2004	Socorro	LINEAR	DOR	3.9 km	MPC · JPL
223678	2004 PH_{82}	—	August 10, 2004	Socorro	LINEAR	·	2.4 km	MPC · JPL
223679	2004 PA_{86}	—	August 11, 2004	Socorro	LINEAR	·	3.2 km	MPC · JPL
223680	2004 PF_{87}	—	August 11, 2004	Socorro	LINEAR	·	2.6 km	MPC · JPL
223681	2004 PE_{89}	—	August 9, 2004	Socorro	LINEAR	·	2.4 km	MPC · JPL
223682	2004 PO_{92}	—	August 12, 2004	Palomar	NEAT	·	3.2 km	MPC · JPL
223683	2004 PA_{93}	—	August 11, 2004	Reedy Creek	J. Broughton	·	3.9 km	MPC · JPL
223684	2004 PM_{93}	—	August 11, 2004	Palomar	NEAT	·	3.0 km	MPC · JPL
223685 Hartopp	2004 QC_{1}	Hartopp	August 18, 2004	Begues	Manteca, J.	·	3.8 km	MPC · JPL
223686	2004 QV_{1}	—	August 19, 2004	Socorro	LINEAR	·	2.6 km	MPC · JPL
223687	2004 QN_{11}	—	August 21, 2004	Siding Spring	SSS	GEF	1.8 km	MPC · JPL
223688	2004 QQ_{17}	—	August 19, 2004	Socorro	LINEAR	EUP	7.3 km	MPC · JPL
223689	2004 QA_{26}	—	August 20, 2004	Kitt Peak	Spacewatch	·	2.0 km	MPC · JPL
223690	2004 QD_{27}	—	August 25, 2004	Kitt Peak	Spacewatch	HOF	2.7 km	MPC · JPL
223691	2004 QK_{27}	—	August 22, 2004	Siding Spring	SSS	·	2.8 km	MPC · JPL
223692	2004 RK_{1}	—	September 4, 2004	Palomar	NEAT	·	2.7 km	MPC · JPL
223693	2004 RG_{16}	—	September 7, 2004	Kitt Peak	Spacewatch	AGN	1.7 km	MPC · JPL
223694	2004 RT_{21}	—	September 7, 2004	Kitt Peak	Spacewatch	·	2.1 km	MPC · JPL
223695	2004 RC_{24}	—	September 8, 2004	Socorro	LINEAR	H	800 m	MPC · JPL
223696	2004 RL_{26}	—	September 6, 2004	Palomar	NEAT	·	2.6 km	MPC · JPL
223697	2004 RO_{28}	—	September 6, 2004	Siding Spring	SSS	HOF	3.6 km	MPC · JPL
223698	2004 RB_{30}	—	September 7, 2004	Socorro	LINEAR	·	2.4 km	MPC · JPL
223699	2004 RC_{30}	—	September 7, 2004	Socorro	LINEAR	·	2.9 km	MPC · JPL
223700	2004 RT_{31}	—	September 7, 2004	Socorro	LINEAR	·	3.1 km	MPC · JPL

== 223701–223800 ==
back to top

Designation			Discovery			Properties		Ref
Permanent	Provisional	Named after	Date	Site	Discoverer(s)	Category	Diam.	Ref
223701	2004 RR_{34}	—	September 7, 2004	Socorro	LINEAR	·	2.7 km	MPC · JPL
223702	2004 RZ_{34}	—	September 7, 2004	Socorro	LINEAR	·	2.8 km	MPC · JPL
223703	2004 RM_{35}	—	September 7, 2004	Socorro	LINEAR	·	2.9 km	MPC · JPL
223704	2004 RQ_{39}	—	September 7, 2004	Kitt Peak	Spacewatch	AGN	1.6 km	MPC · JPL
223705	2004 RU_{40}	—	September 7, 2004	Socorro	LINEAR	BRA	2.7 km	MPC · JPL
223706	2004 RH_{46}	—	September 8, 2004	Socorro	LINEAR	·	3.0 km	MPC · JPL
223707	2004 RF_{48}	—	September 8, 2004	Socorro	LINEAR	AST	3.8 km	MPC · JPL
223708	2004 RD_{61}	—	September 8, 2004	Socorro	LINEAR	·	2.8 km	MPC · JPL
223709	2004 RO_{61}	—	September 8, 2004	Socorro	LINEAR	·	3.1 km	MPC · JPL
223710	2004 RX_{68}	—	September 8, 2004	Socorro	LINEAR	·	3.3 km	MPC · JPL
223711	2004 RL_{71}	—	September 8, 2004	Socorro	LINEAR	·	3.3 km	MPC · JPL
223712	2004 RP_{79}	—	September 8, 2004	Palomar	NEAT	EOS	2.8 km	MPC · JPL
223713	2004 RE_{81}	—	September 8, 2004	Socorro	LINEAR	·	2.3 km	MPC · JPL
223714	2004 RL_{87}	—	September 7, 2004	Kitt Peak	Spacewatch	·	2.3 km	MPC · JPL
223715	2004 RM_{90}	—	September 8, 2004	Socorro	LINEAR	BRA	2.3 km	MPC · JPL
223716	2004 RB_{91}	—	September 8, 2004	Socorro	LINEAR	·	3.1 km	MPC · JPL
223717	2004 RG_{92}	—	September 8, 2004	Socorro	LINEAR	·	2.3 km	MPC · JPL
223718	2004 RW_{94}	—	September 8, 2004	Socorro	LINEAR	·	2.9 km	MPC · JPL
223719	2004 RW_{95}	—	September 8, 2004	Socorro	LINEAR	·	3.0 km	MPC · JPL
223720	2004 RB_{106}	—	September 8, 2004	Palomar	NEAT	·	3.9 km	MPC · JPL
223721	2004 RD_{106}	—	September 8, 2004	Palomar	NEAT	EOS	3.2 km	MPC · JPL
223722	2004 RY_{110}	—	September 11, 2004	Goodricke-Pigott	R. A. Tucker	·	3.2 km	MPC · JPL
223723	2004 RA_{111}	—	September 8, 2004	Socorro	LINEAR	·	2.7 km	MPC · JPL
223724	2004 RH_{114}	—	September 7, 2004	Socorro	LINEAR	KOR	2.3 km	MPC · JPL
223725	2004 RJ_{114}	—	September 7, 2004	Socorro	LINEAR	·	2.6 km	MPC · JPL
223726	2004 RT_{114}	—	September 7, 2004	Socorro	LINEAR	MIS	3.4 km	MPC · JPL
223727	2004 RX_{116}	—	September 7, 2004	Socorro	LINEAR	NEM	3.6 km	MPC · JPL
223728	2004 RZ_{116}	—	September 7, 2004	Socorro	LINEAR	·	2.6 km	MPC · JPL
223729	2004 RK_{131}	—	September 7, 2004	Kitt Peak	Spacewatch	AST	2.4 km	MPC · JPL
223730	2004 RE_{139}	—	September 8, 2004	Socorro	LINEAR	·	3.2 km	MPC · JPL
223731	2004 RM_{139}	—	September 8, 2004	Socorro	LINEAR	·	2.0 km	MPC · JPL
223732	2004 RV_{139}	—	September 8, 2004	Socorro	LINEAR	·	3.6 km	MPC · JPL
223733	2004 RD_{141}	—	September 8, 2004	Socorro	LINEAR	·	3.2 km	MPC · JPL
223734	2004 RK_{149}	—	September 9, 2004	Socorro	LINEAR	slow	4.0 km	MPC · JPL
223735	2004 RR_{149}	—	September 9, 2004	Socorro	LINEAR	·	2.6 km	MPC · JPL
223736	2004 RY_{149}	—	September 9, 2004	Socorro	LINEAR	·	3.3 km	MPC · JPL
223737	2004 RR_{152}	—	September 10, 2004	Socorro	LINEAR	·	2.7 km	MPC · JPL
223738	2004 RA_{153}	—	September 10, 2004	Socorro	LINEAR	·	1.8 km	MPC · JPL
223739	2004 RO_{156}	—	September 10, 2004	Socorro	LINEAR	·	2.9 km	MPC · JPL
223740	2004 RU_{160}	—	September 10, 2004	Kitt Peak	Spacewatch	·	2.2 km	MPC · JPL
223741	2004 RT_{161}	—	September 11, 2004	Socorro	LINEAR	EUN	2.2 km	MPC · JPL
223742	2004 RS_{167}	—	September 7, 2004	Palomar	NEAT	·	3.0 km	MPC · JPL
223743	2004 RT_{173}	—	September 10, 2004	Socorro	LINEAR	·	2.4 km	MPC · JPL
223744	2004 RV_{175}	—	September 10, 2004	Socorro	LINEAR	·	3.4 km	MPC · JPL
223745	2004 RV_{179}	—	September 10, 2004	Socorro	LINEAR	·	1.8 km	MPC · JPL
223746	2004 RO_{180}	—	September 10, 2004	Socorro	LINEAR	·	3.9 km	MPC · JPL
223747	2004 RA_{184}	—	September 10, 2004	Socorro	LINEAR	·	3.6 km	MPC · JPL
223748	2004 RT_{188}	—	September 10, 2004	Socorro	LINEAR	DOR	4.8 km	MPC · JPL
223749	2004 RO_{189}	—	September 10, 2004	Socorro	LINEAR	GEF	2.2 km	MPC · JPL
223750	2004 RJ_{194}	—	September 10, 2004	Socorro	LINEAR	GEF	1.9 km	MPC · JPL
223751	2004 RR_{196}	—	September 10, 2004	Socorro	LINEAR	GEF · slow	2.4 km	MPC · JPL
223752	2004 RO_{197}	—	September 10, 2004	Socorro	LINEAR	·	4.4 km	MPC · JPL
223753	2004 RE_{206}	—	September 10, 2004	Socorro	LINEAR	·	3.5 km	MPC · JPL
223754	2004 RR_{208}	—	September 11, 2004	Socorro	LINEAR	·	2.6 km	MPC · JPL
223755	2004 RH_{217}	—	September 11, 2004	Socorro	LINEAR	·	4.0 km	MPC · JPL
223756	2004 RG_{223}	—	September 7, 2004	Kitt Peak	Spacewatch	·	2.9 km	MPC · JPL
223757	2004 RA_{230}	—	September 9, 2004	Kitt Peak	Spacewatch	·	2.1 km	MPC · JPL
223758	2004 RC_{232}	—	September 9, 2004	Kitt Peak	Spacewatch	·	2.1 km	MPC · JPL
223759	2004 RF_{233}	—	September 9, 2004	Kitt Peak	Spacewatch	KOR	1.7 km	MPC · JPL
223760	2004 RH_{235}	—	September 10, 2004	Socorro	LINEAR	·	2.7 km	MPC · JPL
223761	2004 RO_{240}	—	September 10, 2004	Kitt Peak	Spacewatch	KOR	1.7 km	MPC · JPL
223762	2004 RA_{245}	—	September 10, 2004	Kitt Peak	Spacewatch	·	2.3 km	MPC · JPL
223763	2004 RW_{245}	—	September 10, 2004	Kitt Peak	Spacewatch	·	3.4 km	MPC · JPL
223764	2004 RL_{255}	—	September 6, 2004	Palomar	NEAT	·	3.4 km	MPC · JPL
223765	2004 RX_{256}	—	September 9, 2004	Anderson Mesa	LONEOS	AGN	1.7 km	MPC · JPL
223766	2004 RP_{257}	—	September 9, 2004	Anderson Mesa	LONEOS	·	2.9 km	MPC · JPL
223767	2004 RW_{281}	—	September 15, 2004	Kitt Peak	Spacewatch	KOR	1.7 km	MPC · JPL
223768	2004 RE_{290}	—	September 7, 2004	Socorro	LINEAR	DOR	5.4 km	MPC · JPL
223769	2004 RF_{291}	—	September 10, 2004	Kitt Peak	Spacewatch	AGN	1.5 km	MPC · JPL
223770	2004 RH_{300}	—	September 11, 2004	Kitt Peak	Spacewatch	AGN	1.6 km	MPC · JPL
223771	2004 RL_{308}	—	September 13, 2004	Socorro	LINEAR	·	3.3 km	MPC · JPL
223772	2004 RD_{322}	—	September 13, 2004	Socorro	LINEAR	·	3.5 km	MPC · JPL
223773	2004 RB_{333}	—	September 15, 2004	Anderson Mesa	LONEOS	·	2.6 km	MPC · JPL
223774	2004 SB_{11}	—	September 16, 2004	Siding Spring	SSS	GEF	2.0 km	MPC · JPL
223775	2004 SV_{11}	—	September 16, 2004	Siding Spring	SSS	·	3.4 km	MPC · JPL
223776	2004 SS_{14}	—	September 17, 2004	Anderson Mesa	LONEOS	TEL	2.2 km	MPC · JPL
223777	2004 SD_{16}	—	September 17, 2004	Anderson Mesa	LONEOS	·	3.8 km	MPC · JPL
223778	2004 SK_{21}	—	September 16, 2004	Kitt Peak	Spacewatch	·	2.6 km	MPC · JPL
223779	2004 SO_{23}	—	September 17, 2004	Kitt Peak	Spacewatch	·	3.2 km	MPC · JPL
223780	2004 SD_{30}	—	September 17, 2004	Socorro	LINEAR	·	2.2 km	MPC · JPL
223781	2004 SE_{32}	—	September 17, 2004	Socorro	LINEAR	·	2.7 km	MPC · JPL
223782	2004 ST_{37}	—	September 17, 2004	Kitt Peak	Spacewatch	·	2.4 km	MPC · JPL
223783	2004 SB_{42}	—	September 18, 2004	Socorro	LINEAR	·	2.5 km	MPC · JPL
223784	2004 SC_{45}	—	September 18, 2004	Socorro	LINEAR	·	3.3 km	MPC · JPL
223785	2004 SQ_{46}	—	September 18, 2004	Socorro	LINEAR	DOR	3.9 km	MPC · JPL
223786	2004 SQ_{47}	—	September 18, 2004	Socorro	LINEAR	·	4.3 km	MPC · JPL
223787	2004 SD_{48}	—	September 18, 2004	Socorro	LINEAR	·	5.3 km	MPC · JPL
223788	2004 SK_{50}	—	September 22, 2004	Socorro	LINEAR	·	5.4 km	MPC · JPL
223789	2004 SR_{50}	—	September 22, 2004	Kitt Peak	Spacewatch	·	2.9 km	MPC · JPL
223790	2004 SZ_{50}	—	September 22, 2004	Kitt Peak	Spacewatch	KOR	1.7 km	MPC · JPL
223791	2004 TS_{1}	—	October 3, 2004	Palomar	NEAT	·	3.2 km	MPC · JPL
223792	2004 TZ_{5}	—	October 5, 2004	Kitt Peak	Spacewatch	KOR	1.6 km	MPC · JPL
223793	2004 TV_{7}	—	October 5, 2004	Charleston	Astronomical Research Observatory	·	2.6 km	MPC · JPL
223794	2004 TN_{10}	—	October 5, 2004	Sonoita	W. R. Cooney Jr., Gross, J.	·	2.5 km	MPC · JPL
223795	2004 TY_{15}	—	October 8, 2004	Anderson Mesa	LONEOS	·	3.7 km	MPC · JPL
223796	2004 TY_{18}	—	October 10, 2004	Socorro	LINEAR	H	730 m	MPC · JPL
223797	2004 TM_{19}	—	October 8, 2004	Goodricke-Pigott	R. A. Tucker	·	3.9 km	MPC · JPL
223798	2004 TK_{27}	—	October 4, 2004	Kitt Peak	Spacewatch	EOS	2.4 km	MPC · JPL
223799	2004 TN_{35}	—	October 4, 2004	Kitt Peak	Spacewatch	KOR	1.6 km	MPC · JPL
223800	2004 TQ_{36}	—	October 4, 2004	Kitt Peak	Spacewatch	·	3.7 km	MPC · JPL

== 223801–223900 ==
back to top

Designation			Discovery			Properties		Ref
Permanent	Provisional	Named after	Date	Site	Discoverer(s)	Category	Diam.	Ref
223801	2004 TR_{38}	—	October 4, 2004	Kitt Peak	Spacewatch	AST	3.1 km	MPC · JPL
223802	2004 TW_{38}	—	October 4, 2004	Kitt Peak	Spacewatch	EOS	2.0 km	MPC · JPL
223803	2004 TM_{40}	—	October 4, 2004	Kitt Peak	Spacewatch	DOR	3.4 km	MPC · JPL
223804	2004 TA_{43}	—	October 4, 2004	Kitt Peak	Spacewatch	·	3.1 km	MPC · JPL
223805	2004 TL_{48}	—	October 4, 2004	Kitt Peak	Spacewatch	KOR	2.0 km	MPC · JPL
223806	2004 TA_{53}	—	October 4, 2004	Kitt Peak	Spacewatch	KOR	1.7 km	MPC · JPL
223807	2004 TR_{53}	—	October 4, 2004	Kitt Peak	Spacewatch	·	4.4 km	MPC · JPL
223808	2004 TF_{56}	—	October 5, 2004	Anderson Mesa	LONEOS	·	3.1 km	MPC · JPL
223809	2004 TC_{61}	—	October 5, 2004	Anderson Mesa	LONEOS	·	2.3 km	MPC · JPL
223810	2004 TM_{65}	—	October 5, 2004	Palomar	NEAT	·	3.1 km	MPC · JPL
223811	2004 TL_{72}	—	October 6, 2004	Kitt Peak	Spacewatch	·	2.7 km	MPC · JPL
223812	2004 TN_{75}	—	October 6, 2004	Kitt Peak	Spacewatch	·	3.6 km	MPC · JPL
223813	2004 TF_{86}	—	October 5, 2004	Kitt Peak	Spacewatch	KOR	1.8 km	MPC · JPL
223814	2004 TR_{93}	—	October 5, 2004	Kitt Peak	Spacewatch	·	2.2 km	MPC · JPL
223815	2004 TU_{94}	—	October 5, 2004	Kitt Peak	Spacewatch	·	3.6 km	MPC · JPL
223816	2004 TQ_{97}	—	October 5, 2004	Kitt Peak	Spacewatch	EOS	2.1 km	MPC · JPL
223817	2004 TP_{99}	—	October 5, 2004	Kitt Peak	Spacewatch	·	2.9 km	MPC · JPL
223818	2004 TA_{103}	—	October 6, 2004	Palomar	NEAT	·	4.7 km	MPC · JPL
223819	2004 TD_{106}	—	October 7, 2004	Socorro	LINEAR	HOF	4.3 km	MPC · JPL
223820	2004 TG_{106}	—	October 7, 2004	Socorro	LINEAR	·	3.5 km	MPC · JPL
223821	2004 TX_{107}	—	October 7, 2004	Socorro	LINEAR	·	2.9 km	MPC · JPL
223822	2004 TJ_{110}	—	October 7, 2004	Anderson Mesa	LONEOS	·	4.6 km	MPC · JPL
223823	2004 TP_{111}	—	October 7, 2004	Kitt Peak	Spacewatch	·	2.8 km	MPC · JPL
223824	2004 TA_{114}	—	October 7, 2004	Palomar	NEAT	EOS	2.8 km	MPC · JPL
223825	2004 TY_{115}	—	October 15, 2004	Goodricke-Pigott	Goodricke-Pigott	·	2.4 km	MPC · JPL
223826	2004 TS_{121}	—	October 7, 2004	Anderson Mesa	LONEOS	HOF	4.1 km	MPC · JPL
223827	2004 TC_{122}	—	October 7, 2004	Anderson Mesa	LONEOS	·	5.0 km	MPC · JPL
223828	2004 TJ_{122}	—	October 7, 2004	Anderson Mesa	LONEOS	KOR	2.2 km	MPC · JPL
223829	2004 TR_{125}	—	October 7, 2004	Socorro	LINEAR	KOR	1.7 km	MPC · JPL
223830	2004 TW_{125}	—	October 7, 2004	Socorro	LINEAR	·	4.0 km	MPC · JPL
223831	2004 TG_{129}	—	October 7, 2004	Socorro	LINEAR	TEL	1.8 km	MPC · JPL
223832	2004 TA_{136}	—	October 8, 2004	Anderson Mesa	LONEOS	·	3.0 km	MPC · JPL
223833	2004 TP_{136}	—	October 8, 2004	Anderson Mesa	LONEOS	·	4.0 km	MPC · JPL
223834	2004 TA_{141}	—	October 4, 2004	Kitt Peak	Spacewatch	·	3.1 km	MPC · JPL
223835	2004 TP_{143}	—	October 4, 2004	Kitt Peak	Spacewatch	KOR	1.7 km	MPC · JPL
223836	2004 TS_{143}	—	October 4, 2004	Kitt Peak	Spacewatch	EOS	3.0 km	MPC · JPL
223837	2004 TO_{144}	—	October 4, 2004	Kitt Peak	Spacewatch	EOS	2.9 km	MPC · JPL
223838	2004 TV_{144}	—	October 4, 2004	Kitt Peak	Spacewatch	·	3.5 km	MPC · JPL
223839	2004 TC_{152}	—	October 6, 2004	Kitt Peak	Spacewatch	·	2.5 km	MPC · JPL
223840	2004 TY_{155}	—	October 6, 2004	Kitt Peak	Spacewatch	·	2.3 km	MPC · JPL
223841	2004 TO_{162}	—	October 6, 2004	Kitt Peak	Spacewatch	·	3.1 km	MPC · JPL
223842	2004 TR_{168}	—	October 7, 2004	Socorro	LINEAR	·	3.2 km	MPC · JPL
223843	2004 TA_{173}	—	October 8, 2004	Socorro	LINEAR	EOS	3.0 km	MPC · JPL
223844	2004 TH_{173}	—	October 8, 2004	Socorro	LINEAR	EOS	3.3 km	MPC · JPL
223845	2004 TL_{174}	—	October 9, 2004	Socorro	LINEAR	·	2.1 km	MPC · JPL
223846	2004 TW_{190}	—	October 7, 2004	Kitt Peak	Spacewatch	·	2.4 km	MPC · JPL
223847	2004 TM_{191}	—	October 7, 2004	Kitt Peak	Spacewatch	·	3.1 km	MPC · JPL
223848	2004 TA_{199}	—	October 7, 2004	Kitt Peak	Spacewatch	·	2.1 km	MPC · JPL
223849	2004 TT_{202}	—	October 7, 2004	Kitt Peak	Spacewatch	·	3.5 km	MPC · JPL
223850	2004 TN_{203}	—	October 7, 2004	Kitt Peak	Spacewatch	·	3.8 km	MPC · JPL
223851	2004 TO_{203}	—	October 7, 2004	Kitt Peak	Spacewatch	·	3.5 km	MPC · JPL
223852	2004 TH_{211}	—	October 8, 2004	Kitt Peak	Spacewatch	·	2.9 km	MPC · JPL
223853	2004 TW_{219}	—	October 5, 2004	Kitt Peak	Spacewatch	KOR	1.5 km	MPC · JPL
223854	2004 TL_{239}	—	October 9, 2004	Kitt Peak	Spacewatch	·	2.6 km	MPC · JPL
223855	2004 TR_{241}	—	October 10, 2004	Palomar	NEAT	·	3.4 km	MPC · JPL
223856	2004 TS_{241}	—	October 10, 2004	Socorro	LINEAR	·	2.9 km	MPC · JPL
223857	2004 TE_{242}	—	October 15, 2004	Mount Lemmon	Mount Lemmon Survey	KOR	1.7 km	MPC · JPL
223858	2004 TK_{273}	—	October 9, 2004	Kitt Peak	Spacewatch	·	4.0 km	MPC · JPL
223859	2004 TJ_{275}	—	October 9, 2004	Kitt Peak	Spacewatch	·	2.1 km	MPC · JPL
223860	2004 TP_{278}	—	October 9, 2004	Kitt Peak	Spacewatch	·	3.6 km	MPC · JPL
223861	2004 TU_{283}	—	October 8, 2004	Kitt Peak	Spacewatch	KOR	1.7 km	MPC · JPL
223862	2004 TS_{285}	—	October 8, 2004	Socorro	LINEAR	VER	4.0 km	MPC · JPL
223863	2004 TU_{295}	—	October 10, 2004	Kitt Peak	Spacewatch	EOS	2.8 km	MPC · JPL
223864	2004 TH_{296}	—	October 10, 2004	Kitt Peak	Spacewatch	EOS	2.8 km	MPC · JPL
223865	2004 TE_{308}	—	October 10, 2004	Socorro	LINEAR	EOS	3.1 km	MPC · JPL
223866	2004 TU_{308}	—	October 10, 2004	Socorro	LINEAR	·	2.9 km	MPC · JPL
223867	2004 TQ_{322}	—	October 11, 2004	Kitt Peak	Spacewatch	VER	4.5 km	MPC · JPL
223868	2004 TQ_{327}	—	October 3, 2004	Palomar	NEAT	·	3.1 km	MPC · JPL
223869	2004 TJ_{336}	—	October 10, 2004	Kitt Peak	Spacewatch	·	3.1 km	MPC · JPL
223870	2004 TX_{336}	—	October 11, 2004	Kitt Peak	Spacewatch	·	3.3 km	MPC · JPL
223871	2004 TK_{343}	—	October 14, 2004	Socorro	LINEAR	·	4.7 km	MPC · JPL
223872	2004 TX_{344}	—	October 15, 2004	Kitt Peak	Spacewatch	TEL	2.5 km	MPC · JPL
223873	2004 TU_{345}	—	October 14, 2004	Palomar	NEAT	·	3.0 km	MPC · JPL
223874	2004 TG_{359}	—	October 7, 2004	Kitt Peak	Spacewatch	HYG	4.1 km	MPC · JPL
223875	2004 TH_{366}	—	October 9, 2004	Kitt Peak	Spacewatch	·	4.1 km	MPC · JPL
223876	2004 TT_{366}	—	October 9, 2004	Kitt Peak	Spacewatch	·	2.0 km	MPC · JPL
223877 Kutler	2004 TO_{367}	Kutler	October 15, 2004	Mount Lemmon	Mount Lemmon Survey	·	4.9 km	MPC · JPL
223878	2004 UC_{2}	—	October 18, 2004	Socorro	LINEAR	·	3.4 km	MPC · JPL
223879 Anthonyegan	2004 UL_{5}	Anthonyegan	October 18, 2004	Kitt Peak	M. W. Buie	KOR	1.7 km	MPC · JPL
223880	2004 UK_{8}	—	October 21, 2004	Socorro	LINEAR	·	2.8 km	MPC · JPL
223881	2004 UB_{9}	—	October 23, 2004	Kitt Peak	Spacewatch	·	3.0 km	MPC · JPL
223882	2004 UH_{10}	—	October 21, 2004	Socorro	LINEAR	·	3.6 km	MPC · JPL
223883	2004 VC_{1}	—	November 2, 2004	Goodricke-Pigott	R. A. Tucker	·	3.8 km	MPC · JPL
223884	2004 VT_{4}	—	November 3, 2004	Anderson Mesa	LONEOS	·	3.3 km	MPC · JPL
223885	2004 VL_{6}	—	November 3, 2004	Kitt Peak	Spacewatch	·	3.4 km	MPC · JPL
223886	2004 VO_{9}	—	November 3, 2004	Anderson Mesa	LONEOS	·	5.5 km	MPC · JPL
223887	2004 VY_{9}	—	November 3, 2004	Anderson Mesa	LONEOS	·	3.5 km	MPC · JPL
223888	2004 VA_{14}	—	November 4, 2004	Kitt Peak	Spacewatch	·	2.7 km	MPC · JPL
223889	2004 VS_{14}	—	November 4, 2004	Catalina	CSS	WIT	1.6 km	MPC · JPL
223890	2004 VN_{16}	—	November 4, 2004	Catalina	CSS	H	760 m	MPC · JPL
223891	2004 VN_{20}	—	November 4, 2004	Catalina	CSS	EMA	4.8 km	MPC · JPL
223892	2004 VF_{22}	—	November 4, 2004	Catalina	CSS	·	3.4 km	MPC · JPL
223893	2004 VB_{23}	—	November 5, 2004	Campo Imperatore	CINEOS	·	5.3 km	MPC · JPL
223894	2004 VJ_{23}	—	November 5, 2004	Palomar	NEAT	·	4.1 km	MPC · JPL
223895	2004 VZ_{24}	—	November 4, 2004	Anderson Mesa	LONEOS	·	7.2 km	MPC · JPL
223896	2004 VH_{26}	—	November 4, 2004	Catalina	CSS	·	3.6 km	MPC · JPL
223897	2004 VL_{27}	—	November 5, 2004	Kitt Peak	Spacewatch	·	4.6 km	MPC · JPL
223898	2004 VX_{27}	—	November 5, 2004	Palomar	NEAT	HYG	4.4 km	MPC · JPL
223899	2004 VO_{28}	—	November 7, 2004	Socorro	LINEAR	·	3.1 km	MPC · JPL
223900	2004 VB_{32}	—	November 3, 2004	Kitt Peak	Spacewatch	·	3.2 km	MPC · JPL

== 223901–224000 ==
back to top

Designation			Discovery			Properties		Ref
Permanent	Provisional	Named after	Date	Site	Discoverer(s)	Category	Diam.	Ref
223901	2004 VM_{35}	—	November 3, 2004	Kitt Peak	Spacewatch	·	2.0 km	MPC · JPL
223902	2004 VX_{35}	—	November 4, 2004	Kitt Peak	Spacewatch	·	3.0 km	MPC · JPL
223903	2004 VU_{44}	—	November 4, 2004	Kitt Peak	Spacewatch	EOS ·	4.7 km	MPC · JPL
223904	2004 VK_{56}	—	November 4, 2004	Kitt Peak	Spacewatch	EOS	2.8 km	MPC · JPL
223905	2004 VH_{58}	—	November 9, 2004	Catalina	CSS	EOS	2.9 km	MPC · JPL
223906	2004 VJ_{60}	—	November 9, 2004	Catalina	CSS	·	5.7 km	MPC · JPL
223907	2004 VO_{60}	—	November 10, 2004	Wrightwood	J. W. Young	VER	4.5 km	MPC · JPL
223908	2004 VQ_{60}	—	November 10, 2004	Wrightwood	J. W. Young	·	2.9 km	MPC · JPL
223909	2004 VJ_{64}	—	November 10, 2004	Goodricke-Pigott	Goodricke-Pigott	·	6.1 km	MPC · JPL
223910	2004 VN_{64}	—	November 6, 2004	Palomar	NEAT	(31811)	4.7 km	MPC · JPL
223911	2004 VR_{65}	—	November 14, 2004	Cordell-Lorenz	D. T. Durig	·	4.1 km	MPC · JPL
223912 Jacobeisig	2004 VF_{67}	Jacobeisig	November 9, 2004	Kitt Peak	M. W. Buie	·	2.8 km	MPC · JPL
223913	2004 VC_{73}	—	November 5, 2004	Anderson Mesa	LONEOS	·	5.2 km	MPC · JPL
223914	2004 VH_{82}	—	November 7, 2004	Socorro	LINEAR	·	5.4 km	MPC · JPL
223915	2004 VU_{90}	—	November 3, 2004	Kitt Peak	Spacewatch	·	4.1 km	MPC · JPL
223916	2004 VA_{91}	—	November 3, 2004	Kitt Peak	Spacewatch	KOR	1.8 km	MPC · JPL
223917	2004 VT_{91}	—	November 3, 2004	Catalina	CSS	URS	5.0 km	MPC · JPL
223918	2004 VU_{91}	—	November 3, 2004	Palomar	NEAT	·	3.2 km	MPC · JPL
223919	2004 VE_{94}	—	November 10, 2004	Kitt Peak	Spacewatch	·	4.3 km	MPC · JPL
223920	2004 VB_{111}	—	November 9, 2004	Mauna Kea	Veillet, C.	KOR	1.8 km	MPC · JPL
223921	2004 WJ	—	November 17, 2004	Siding Spring	SSS	·	2.5 km	MPC · JPL
223922	2004 WA_{3}	—	November 17, 2004	Siding Spring	SSS	·	4.9 km	MPC · JPL
223923	2004 WL_{3}	—	November 17, 2004	Campo Imperatore	CINEOS	EOS	3.2 km	MPC · JPL
223924	2004 WR_{4}	—	November 18, 2004	Campo Imperatore	CINEOS	·	3.8 km	MPC · JPL
223925	2004 WS_{4}	—	November 18, 2004	Campo Imperatore	CINEOS	·	5.2 km	MPC · JPL
223926	2004 WL_{6}	—	November 19, 2004	Socorro	LINEAR	·	5.5 km	MPC · JPL
223927	2004 WP_{8}	—	November 19, 2004	Catalina	CSS	·	3.2 km	MPC · JPL
223928	2004 WM_{10}	—	November 19, 2004	Socorro	LINEAR	·	4.2 km	MPC · JPL
223929	2004 WP_{10}	—	November 19, 2004	Socorro	LINEAR	·	4.6 km	MPC · JPL
223930	2004 XM_{1}	—	December 1, 2004	Catalina	CSS	EOS	2.8 km	MPC · JPL
223931	2004 XH_{2}	—	December 1, 2004	Palomar	NEAT	·	4.2 km	MPC · JPL
223932	2004 XD_{5}	—	December 2, 2004	Catalina	CSS	·	3.1 km	MPC · JPL
223933	2004 XJ_{5}	—	December 2, 2004	Palomar	NEAT	(1101)	6.8 km	MPC · JPL
223934	2004 XL_{5}	—	December 2, 2004	Palomar	NEAT	·	3.2 km	MPC · JPL
223935	2004 XV_{6}	—	December 2, 2004	Socorro	LINEAR	·	3.4 km	MPC · JPL
223936	2004 XT_{7}	—	December 2, 2004	Palomar	NEAT	·	3.7 km	MPC · JPL
223937	2004 XM_{10}	—	December 2, 2004	Palomar	NEAT	·	3.5 km	MPC · JPL
223938	2004 XV_{13}	—	December 9, 2004	Socorro	LINEAR	·	12 km	MPC · JPL
223939	2004 XG_{18}	—	December 8, 2004	Socorro	LINEAR	·	3.7 km	MPC · JPL
223940	2004 XX_{21}	—	December 8, 2004	Socorro	LINEAR	·	4.8 km	MPC · JPL
223941	2004 XJ_{24}	—	December 9, 2004	Catalina	CSS	·	3.4 km	MPC · JPL
223942	2004 XG_{26}	—	December 9, 2004	Kitt Peak	Spacewatch	HYG	4.6 km	MPC · JPL
223943	2004 XW_{26}	—	December 10, 2004	Socorro	LINEAR	·	6.0 km	MPC · JPL
223944	2004 XE_{27}	—	December 10, 2004	Kitt Peak	Spacewatch	·	5.8 km	MPC · JPL
223945	2004 XQ_{31}	—	December 9, 2004	Catalina	CSS	HYG	4.8 km	MPC · JPL
223946	2004 XX_{33}	—	December 11, 2004	Campo Imperatore	CINEOS	·	2.8 km	MPC · JPL
223947	2004 XB_{34}	—	December 11, 2004	Campo Imperatore	CINEOS	EOS	2.9 km	MPC · JPL
223948	2004 XC_{34}	—	December 11, 2004	Campo Imperatore	CINEOS	·	3.3 km	MPC · JPL
223949	2004 XG_{34}	—	December 11, 2004	Socorro	LINEAR	·	3.9 km	MPC · JPL
223950 Mississauga	2004 XY_{35}	Mississauga	December 9, 2004	Vail-Jarnac	Jarnac	·	4.6 km	MPC · JPL
223951	2004 XG_{38}	—	December 7, 2004	Socorro	LINEAR	·	4.1 km	MPC · JPL
223952	2004 XC_{49}	—	December 11, 2004	Socorro	LINEAR	·	5.8 km	MPC · JPL
223953	2004 XC_{52}	—	December 12, 2004	Campo Imperatore	CINEOS	·	5.0 km	MPC · JPL
223954	2004 XK_{71}	—	December 12, 2004	Kitt Peak	Spacewatch	·	2.1 km	MPC · JPL
223955	2004 XL_{73}	—	December 10, 2004	Socorro	LINEAR	·	4.5 km	MPC · JPL
223956	2004 XC_{74}	—	December 8, 2004	Socorro	LINEAR	·	5.7 km	MPC · JPL
223957	2004 XO_{74}	—	December 8, 2004	Socorro	LINEAR	T_{j} (2.9)	9.0 km	MPC · JPL
223958	2004 XV_{76}	—	December 10, 2004	Socorro	LINEAR	·	5.9 km	MPC · JPL
223959	2004 XE_{77}	—	December 10, 2004	Socorro	LINEAR	·	7.2 km	MPC · JPL
223960	2004 XO_{79}	—	December 10, 2004	Socorro	LINEAR	·	4.9 km	MPC · JPL
223961	2004 XG_{82}	—	December 11, 2004	Kitt Peak	Spacewatch	·	4.3 km	MPC · JPL
223962	2004 XN_{83}	—	December 11, 2004	Kitt Peak	Spacewatch	·	3.0 km	MPC · JPL
223963	2004 XD_{87}	—	December 9, 2004	Catalina	CSS	·	3.3 km	MPC · JPL
223964	2004 XH_{93}	—	December 11, 2004	Kitt Peak	Spacewatch	·	5.0 km	MPC · JPL
223965	2004 XY_{102}	—	December 14, 2004	Anderson Mesa	LONEOS	·	7.0 km	MPC · JPL
223966	2004 XR_{108}	—	December 11, 2004	Socorro	LINEAR	·	3.0 km	MPC · JPL
223967	2004 XF_{110}	—	December 14, 2004	Socorro	LINEAR	·	3.3 km	MPC · JPL
223968	2004 XQ_{122}	—	December 9, 2004	Kitt Peak	Spacewatch	(3460)	4.0 km	MPC · JPL
223969	2004 XS_{125}	—	December 11, 2004	Catalina	CSS	·	4.4 km	MPC · JPL
223970	2004 XR_{127}	—	December 14, 2004	Socorro	LINEAR	·	3.1 km	MPC · JPL
223971	2004 XB_{129}	—	December 14, 2004	Anderson Mesa	LONEOS	·	5.6 km	MPC · JPL
223972	2004 XF_{142}	—	December 2, 2004	Kitt Peak	Spacewatch	·	5.0 km	MPC · JPL
223973	2004 XN_{165}	—	December 2, 2004	Palomar	NEAT	VER	4.8 km	MPC · JPL
223974	2004 XF_{174}	—	December 10, 2004	Kitt Peak	Spacewatch	·	3.1 km	MPC · JPL
223975	2004 XL_{179}	—	December 14, 2004	Kitt Peak	Spacewatch	THM	2.9 km	MPC · JPL
223976	2004 XS_{181}	—	December 15, 2004	Catalina	CSS	·	3.9 km	MPC · JPL
223977	2004 YP_{3}	—	December 16, 2004	Anderson Mesa	LONEOS	H	710 m	MPC · JPL
223978	2004 YA_{10}	—	December 18, 2004	Mount Lemmon	Mount Lemmon Survey	·	3.5 km	MPC · JPL
223979	2004 YR_{14}	—	December 18, 2004	Mount Lemmon	Mount Lemmon Survey	THM	3.0 km	MPC · JPL
223980	2004 YM_{25}	—	December 18, 2004	Socorro	LINEAR	·	3.4 km	MPC · JPL
223981	2004 YM_{32}	—	December 22, 2004	Catalina	CSS	H	1.1 km	MPC · JPL
223982	2005 AC_{1}	—	January 1, 2005	Catalina	CSS	·	5.9 km	MPC · JPL
223983	2005 AV_{15}	—	January 6, 2005	Socorro	LINEAR	·	4.3 km	MPC · JPL
223984	2005 AE_{17}	—	January 6, 2005	Socorro	LINEAR	·	7.2 km	MPC · JPL
223985	2005 AO_{34}	—	January 13, 2005	Socorro	LINEAR	·	5.8 km	MPC · JPL
223986	2005 AZ_{39}	—	January 15, 2005	Catalina	CSS	·	2.5 km	MPC · JPL
223987	2005 BE_{1}	—	January 16, 2005	Socorro	LINEAR	H	1.1 km	MPC · JPL
223988	2005 BX_{1}	—	January 16, 2005	Junk Bond	Junk Bond	·	4.3 km	MPC · JPL
223989	2005 BS_{29}	—	January 31, 2005	Socorro	LINEAR	(8737)	4.7 km	MPC · JPL
223990	2005 CH_{24}	—	February 3, 2005	Socorro	LINEAR	·	5.3 km	MPC · JPL
223991	2005 CT_{48}	—	February 2, 2005	Catalina	CSS	HYG	6.0 km	MPC · JPL
223992	2005 EO_{31}	—	March 2, 2005	Catalina	CSS	3:2 · SHU	7.5 km	MPC · JPL
223993	2005 EC_{70}	—	March 8, 2005	Socorro	LINEAR	H	730 m	MPC · JPL
223994	2005 EA_{89}	—	March 8, 2005	Kitt Peak	Spacewatch	·	760 m	MPC · JPL
223995	2005 EM_{140}	—	March 10, 2005	Anderson Mesa	LONEOS	·	4.1 km	MPC · JPL
223996	2005 ER_{224}	—	March 8, 2005	Catalina	CSS	H	1.1 km	MPC · JPL
223997	2005 EQ_{265}	—	March 13, 2005	Catalina	CSS	·	890 m	MPC · JPL
223998	2005 EN_{324}	—	March 11, 2005	Mount Lemmon	Mount Lemmon Survey	·	850 m	MPC · JPL
223999	2005 FS_{5}	—	March 31, 2005	Goodricke-Pigott	Reddy, V.	·	980 m	MPC · JPL
224000	2005 GX_{8}	—	April 1, 2005	Anderson Mesa	LONEOS	·	1.5 km	MPC · JPL

back to top

== See also ==
- Meanings of minor-planet names: 223001–224000
