= Meanings of minor-planet names: 223001–224000 =

As minor planet discoveries are confirmed, they are given a permanent number by the IAU's Minor Planet Center (MPC), and the discoverers can then submit names for them, following the IAU's naming conventions. The list below concerns those minor planets in the specified number-range that have received names, and explains the meanings of those names.

Official naming citations of newly named small Solar System bodies are approved and published in a bulletin by IAU's Working Group for Small Bodies Nomenclature (WGSBN). Before May 2021, citations were published in MPC's Minor Planet Circulars for many decades. Recent citations can also be found on the JPL Small-Body Database (SBDB). Until his death in 2016, German astronomer Lutz D. Schmadel compiled these citations into the Dictionary of Minor Planet Names (DMP) and regularly updated the collection.

Based on Paul Herget's The Names of the Minor Planets, Schmadel also researched the unclear origin of numerous asteroids, most of which had been named prior to World War II. This article incorporates text from this source, which is in the public domain: SBDB New namings may only be added to this list below after official publication as the preannouncement of names is condemned. The WGSBN publishes a comprehensive guideline for the naming rules of non-cometary small Solar System bodies.

== 223001–223100 ==
Named minor planet	Provisional	This minor planet was named for...	Ref · Catalog
There are no named minor planets in this number range

== 223101–223200 ==
back to top

Named minor planet	Provisional	This minor planet was named for...	Ref · Catalog
There are no named minor planets in this number range

== 223201–223300 ==
back to top

Named minor planet	Provisional	This minor planet was named for...	Ref · Catalog
223263 Cheikhoumardia	2003 FR_{124}	Cheikh Oumar Dia (born 1982), Senegalese author and US Embassy logistician.	JPL · 223263
223278 Brianduncan	2003 GR_{53}	Brian P. Duncan (born 1967), American engineer managing software development and mission operations for various missions, including New Horizons.	JPL · 223278

== 223301–223400 ==
back to top

Named minor planet	Provisional	This minor planet was named for...	Ref · Catalog
223339 Gregdunn	2003 QC_{89}	Gregory F. Dunn (born 1979), American engineering team member of the New Horizons payload development team.	JPL · 223339
223360 Švankmajer	2003 SV_{4}	Jan Švankmajer (born 1934), a Czech graphic artist and film-maker, well known for his surreal, nightmarish as well as somewhat funny pictures, creations and animations. Among his best known movies are Alice, Faust and Conspirators of Pleasure, as well as his animations and gadgets of comedy Dinner for Adele	JPL · 223360

== 223401–223500 ==
back to top

Named minor planet	Provisional	This minor planet was named for...	Ref · Catalog
There are no named minor planets in this number range

== 223501–223600 ==
back to top

Named minor planet	Provisional	This minor planet was named for...	Ref · Catalog
223566 Petignat	2004 FL_{17}	Gautier Petignat (born 1941), an active member of the Jura Astronomy Society (French: Société jurassienne d'astronomie) in Switzerland	JPL · 223566

== 223601–223700 ==
back to top

Named minor planet	Provisional	This minor planet was named for...	Ref · Catalog
223633 Rosnyaîné	2004 KJ_{1}	J.-H. Rosny aîné (1856–1940), a French author of Belgian origin, considered to be one of the fathers of modern science fiction	JPL · 223633
223685 Hartopp	2004 QC_{1}	Ramon Hartopp (born 1965) has displayed great enthusiasm for the popularization and dissemination of astronomy and astronautics through courses, conferences and magazine articles, despite being autistic and having Asperger Syndrome. He is a member of AACastelldefels.	JPL · 223685

== 223701–223800 ==
back to top

Named minor planet	Provisional	This minor planet was named for...	Ref · Catalog
There are no named minor planets in this number range

== 223801–223900 ==
back to top

Named minor planet	Provisional	This minor planet was named for...	Ref · Catalog
223877 Kutler	2004 TO_{367}	Brendan Kutler (1992–2009), an accomplished programmer, scientist, artist, Japanese scholar, tennis player and music editor for the online magazine The 8th Circuit, lifted fellow Summer Science Program alumni with his brilliance and selfless, upbeat attitude throughout their minor-planet orbit-determination project.	JPL · 223877
223879 Anthonyegan	2004 UL_{5}	Anthony F. Egan (born 1969), American software and IT engineer.	JPL · 223879

== 223901–224000 ==
back to top

Named minor planet	Provisional	This minor planet was named for...	Ref · Catalog
223912 Jacobeisig	2004 VF_{67}	Jacob M. Eisig (born 1988), American project financial manager.	JPL · 223912
223950 Mississauga	2004 XY_{35}	Mississauga, Ontario, is Canada's sixth largest city.	JPL · 223950

back to top

Preceded by 222,001–223,000	Meanings of minor-planet names List of minor planets: 223,001–224,000	Succeeded by 224,001–225,000
