= Henry Kent =

Henry Kent may refer to:

- Henry Kent (footballer) (1879–1948), English footballer and manager
- Henry Watson Kent (1866–1948), American librarian and museum administrator
- Henry Kent (inventor), Canadian inventor after whom asteroid 254422 Henrykent is named

== See also ==
- Harry Kent (disambiguation)
