= Robin Warren =

Australian pathologist (1937–2024)

Robin Warren AC
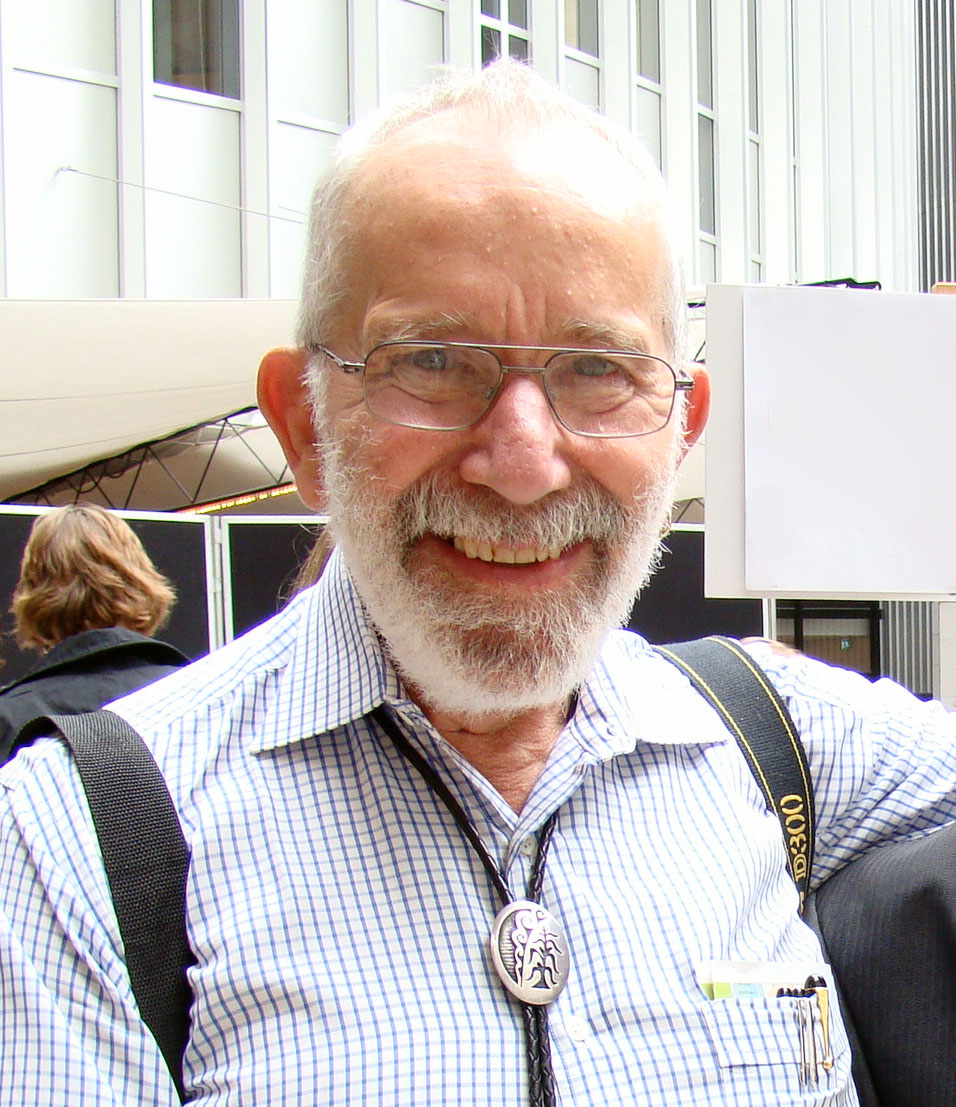
- Warren in 2009
- Born: John Robin Warren; 11 June 1937; Adelaide, South Australia, Australia
- Died: 23 July 2024 (aged 87); Perth, Western Australia, Australia
- Education: University of Adelaide (MBBS)
- Known for: Discovery of Helicobacter pylori
- Awards: Paul Ehrlich and Ludwig Darmstaedter Prize (1997); Nobel Prize in Physiology or Medicine (2005)
- Scientific career
- Fields: Pathologist
- Workplaces: Royal Perth Hospital

John Robin Warren AC (11 June 1937 – 23 July 2024) was an Australian pathologist, Nobel laureate, and researcher who is credited with the 1979 re-discovery of the bacterium Helicobacter pylori, together with Barry Marshall. The duo proved to the medical community that the bacterium Helicobacter pylori (H. pylori) is the cause of most peptic ulcers.

== Early life and education ==
Warren was born 11 June 1937 in North Adelaide. His father, Roger Warren, was a winemaker, and his mother, Helen Warren (née Verco), was a nurse. After completing his high school education at St Peter's College, Adelaide, Warren received his MBBS degree from the University of Adelaide.

== Career ==
Warren trained at the Royal Adelaide Hospital and became a Registrar in Clinical Pathology at the Institute of Medical and Veterinary Science (IMVS). There, he worked in laboratory haematology, which generated his interest in pathology.

In 1963, Warren was appointed Honorary Clinical Assistant in Pathology and Honorary Registrar in Haematology at Royal Adelaide Hospital. Subsequently, he lectured in pathology at Adelaide University and then became Clinical Pathology Registrar at the Royal Melbourne Hospital. In 1967, Warren was elected to the Royal College of Pathologists of Australasia and became a senior pathologist at the Royal Perth Hospital, where he spent the majority of his career.

=== Nobel Prize work ===
At the University of Western Australia, Warren along with his colleague Barry J. Marshall, proved that the bacterium is the infectious cause of stomach ulcers. Warren helped develop a convenient diagnostic test (^{14}C-urea breath-test) for detecting H. pylori in ulcer patients.

In 2005, Warren and Marshall were awarded the Nobel Prize in Medicine.

An Australian documentary was made in 2006 about Warren and Marshall's road to the Nobel Prize, called "The Winner's Guide to the Nobel Prize". He was appointed a Companion of the Order of Australia in 2007. In the same year, he and Marshall were jointly awarded the Australian of the Year for Western Australia award.

Asteroid 254863 Robinwarren, discovered by Italian amateur astronomer Silvano Casulli in 2005, was named in his honour. The official naming citation was published by the Minor Planet Center on 22 April 2016 (M.P.C. 99893).

== Personal life and death ==
Warren married Winifred Teresa Warren (née Williams) in the early 1960s, and together they had five children. Winifred Warren became an accomplished psychiatrist. Following her death in 1997, Warren retired from medicine.

Warren died in Perth, Australia, on 23 July 2024, at the age of 87.

== See also ==
- Timeline of peptic ulcer disease and Helicobacter pylori
