= Harry Kent =

Harry Kent may refer to:

- Harry Kent (footballer) (1879–1948), English footballer and manager
- Harry Kent (cyclist) (1947–2021), racing cyclist from New Zealand
- Harry Kent (architect) (1852–1938), English-born Australian architect

== See also ==
- Henry Kent (disambiguation)
- Harold Kent, Dean of Arches
