= List of minor planets: 254001–255000 =

The following is a partial list of minor planets, running from minor-planet number 254001 through 255000, inclusive. The primary data for this and other partial lists is based on JPL's "Small-Body Orbital Elements" and data available from the Minor Planet Center. Critical list information is also provided by the MPC, unless otherwise specified from Lowell Observatory. A detailed description of the table's columns and additional sources are given on the main page including a complete list of every page in this series, and a statistical break-up on the dynamical classification of minor planets.

Also see the summary list of all named bodies in numerical and alphabetical order, and the corresponding naming citations for the number range of this particular list. New namings may only be added to this list after official publication, as the preannouncement of names is condemned by the Working Group for Small Bodies Nomenclature of the International Astronomical Union.

Near-Earth obj.	MBA (inner)	MBA (outer)	Centaur
Mars-crosser	MBA (middle)	Jupiter trojan	Trans-Neptunian obj.
Unclassified

== 254001–254100 ==
Designation			Discovery			Properties		Ref
Permanent	Provisional	Named after	Date	Site	Discoverer(s)	Category	Diam.	Ref
254001	2004 FT_{2}	—	March 18, 2004	Socorro	LINEAR	H	640 m	MPC · JPL
254002	2004 FW_{4}	—	March 19, 2004	Socorro	LINEAR	H	680 m	MPC · JPL
254003	2004 FM_{5}	—	March 18, 2004	Kitt Peak	Spacewatch	H	570 m	MPC · JPL
254004	2004 FM_{6}	—	March 23, 2004	Socorro	LINEAR	H	560 m	MPC · JPL
254005	2004 FS_{10}	—	March 17, 2004	Kitt Peak	Spacewatch	MAS	860 m	MPC · JPL
254006	2004 FO_{17}	—	March 24, 2004	Anderson Mesa	LONEOS	H	650 m	MPC · JPL
254007	2004 FN_{21}	—	March 16, 2004	Kitt Peak	Spacewatch	·	1.6 km	MPC · JPL
254008	2004 FQ_{21}	—	March 16, 2004	Kitt Peak	Spacewatch	·	1.5 km	MPC · JPL
254009	2004 FP_{23}	—	March 17, 2004	Kitt Peak	Spacewatch	·	1.5 km	MPC · JPL
254010	2004 FM_{24}	—	March 17, 2004	Catalina	CSS	T_{j} (2.92) · 3:2	9.5 km	MPC · JPL
254011	2004 FM_{26}	—	March 17, 2004	Kitt Peak	Spacewatch	HNS	1.3 km	MPC · JPL
254012	2004 FH_{33}	—	March 16, 2004	Catalina	CSS	(5)	1.7 km	MPC · JPL
254013	2004 FC_{37}	—	March 16, 2004	Campo Imperatore	CINEOS	MAS	890 m	MPC · JPL
254014	2004 FJ_{42}	—	March 17, 2004	Kitt Peak	Spacewatch	·	2.2 km	MPC · JPL
254015	2004 FO_{51}	—	March 19, 2004	Palomar	NEAT	·	2.1 km	MPC · JPL
254016	2004 FQ_{52}	—	March 19, 2004	Socorro	LINEAR	·	1.5 km	MPC · JPL
254017	2004 FQ_{59}	—	March 18, 2004	Socorro	LINEAR	·	2.3 km	MPC · JPL
254018	2004 FB_{67}	—	March 20, 2004	Socorro	LINEAR	·	2.0 km	MPC · JPL
254019	2004 FW_{81}	—	March 17, 2004	Kitt Peak	Spacewatch	·	1.6 km	MPC · JPL
254020	2004 FU_{87}	—	March 19, 2004	Socorro	LINEAR	·	1.1 km	MPC · JPL
254021	2004 FF_{89}	—	March 20, 2004	Socorro	LINEAR	·	1.9 km	MPC · JPL
254022	2004 FZ_{93}	—	March 22, 2004	Socorro	LINEAR	slow	2.6 km	MPC · JPL
254023	2004 FV_{106}	—	March 20, 2004	Socorro	LINEAR	·	1.7 km	MPC · JPL
254024	2004 FK_{107}	—	March 20, 2004	Socorro	LINEAR	·	3.3 km	MPC · JPL
254025	2004 FV_{109}	—	March 24, 2004	Anderson Mesa	LONEOS	·	2.7 km	MPC · JPL
254026	2004 FM_{118}	—	March 22, 2004	Socorro	LINEAR	MIS	3.7 km	MPC · JPL
254027	2004 FH_{125}	—	March 27, 2004	Socorro	LINEAR	·	2.1 km	MPC · JPL
254028	2004 FG_{126}	—	March 27, 2004	Socorro	LINEAR	·	2.3 km	MPC · JPL
254029	2004 FU_{127}	—	March 27, 2004	Socorro	LINEAR	·	2.6 km	MPC · JPL
254030	2004 FD_{131}	—	March 22, 2004	Anderson Mesa	LONEOS	EUN	2.2 km	MPC · JPL
254031	2004 FS_{134}	—	March 26, 2004	Kitt Peak	Spacewatch	·	2.0 km	MPC · JPL
254032	2004 FB_{139}	—	March 19, 2004	Socorro	LINEAR	·	2.2 km	MPC · JPL
254033	2004 FZ_{139}	—	March 26, 2004	Kitt Peak	Spacewatch	·	2.6 km	MPC · JPL
254034	2004 FD_{142}	—	March 27, 2004	Socorro	LINEAR	MAS	920 m	MPC · JPL
254035	2004 FT_{143}	—	March 28, 2004	Socorro	LINEAR	·	2.4 km	MPC · JPL
254036	2004 FJ_{147}	—	March 29, 2004	Socorro	LINEAR	H	700 m	MPC · JPL
254037	2004 GJ_{1}	—	April 9, 2004	Siding Spring	SSS	·	3.5 km	MPC · JPL
254038	2004 GB_{11}	—	April 12, 2004	Palomar	NEAT	T_{j} (2.98)	7.1 km	MPC · JPL
254039	2004 GL_{13}	—	April 12, 2004	Siding Spring	SSS	·	2.6 km	MPC · JPL
254040	2004 GU_{17}	—	April 12, 2004	Kitt Peak	Spacewatch	·	1.1 km	MPC · JPL
254041	2004 GO_{18}	—	April 13, 2004	Catalina	CSS	·	3.4 km	MPC · JPL
254042	2004 GF_{20}	—	April 15, 2004	Siding Spring	SSS	H	790 m	MPC · JPL
254043	2004 GO_{21}	—	April 11, 2004	Palomar	NEAT	·	2.3 km	MPC · JPL
254044	2004 GP_{26}	—	April 14, 2004	Anderson Mesa	LONEOS	·	3.2 km	MPC · JPL
254045	2004 GB_{28}	—	April 13, 2004	Palomar	NEAT	H	650 m	MPC · JPL
254046	2004 GF_{29}	—	April 12, 2004	Palomar	NEAT	·	1.4 km	MPC · JPL
254047	2004 GW_{30}	—	April 13, 2004	Kitt Peak	Spacewatch	·	1.9 km	MPC · JPL
254048	2004 GN_{31}	—	April 15, 2004	Anderson Mesa	LONEOS	(5)	1.4 km	MPC · JPL
254049	2004 GY_{32}	—	April 12, 2004	Palomar	NEAT	·	1.9 km	MPC · JPL
254050	2004 GD_{33}	—	April 12, 2004	Anderson Mesa	LONEOS	·	1.9 km	MPC · JPL
254051	2004 GT_{41}	—	April 13, 2004	Palomar	NEAT	·	1.5 km	MPC · JPL
254052	2004 GH_{46}	—	April 12, 2004	Kitt Peak	Spacewatch	·	2.3 km	MPC · JPL
254053	2004 GO_{47}	—	April 12, 2004	Kitt Peak	Spacewatch	·	1.9 km	MPC · JPL
254054	2004 GT_{51}	—	April 13, 2004	Kitt Peak	Spacewatch	·	4.2 km	MPC · JPL
254055	2004 GA_{60}	—	April 13, 2004	Kitt Peak	Spacewatch	·	3.2 km	MPC · JPL
254056	2004 GU_{60}	—	April 14, 2004	Kitt Peak	Spacewatch	·	2.4 km	MPC · JPL
254057	2004 GG_{73}	—	April 15, 2004	Anderson Mesa	LONEOS	·	2.5 km	MPC · JPL
254058	2004 GW_{85}	—	April 14, 2004	Kitt Peak	Spacewatch	·	2.9 km	MPC · JPL
254059	2004 HN_{4}	—	April 16, 2004	Socorro	LINEAR	·	1.4 km	MPC · JPL
254060	2004 HM_{6}	—	April 17, 2004	Socorro	LINEAR	EUN	2.0 km	MPC · JPL
254061	2004 HP_{15}	—	April 16, 2004	Kitt Peak	Spacewatch	·	2.4 km	MPC · JPL
254062	2004 HB_{17}	—	April 16, 2004	Kitt Peak	Spacewatch	·	1.5 km	MPC · JPL
254063	2004 HU_{20}	—	April 20, 2004	Socorro	LINEAR	·	2.5 km	MPC · JPL
254064	2004 HW_{20}	—	April 20, 2004	Socorro	LINEAR	·	2.3 km	MPC · JPL
254065	2004 HZ_{26}	—	April 20, 2004	Kitt Peak	Spacewatch	EUN	1.5 km	MPC · JPL
254066	2004 HA_{30}	—	April 21, 2004	Kitt Peak	Spacewatch	·	3.2 km	MPC · JPL
254067	2004 HO_{32}	—	April 20, 2004	Socorro	LINEAR	H	750 m	MPC · JPL
254068	2004 HA_{35}	—	April 19, 2004	Kitt Peak	Spacewatch	NEM	2.7 km	MPC · JPL
254069	2004 HG_{35}	—	April 20, 2004	Kitt Peak	Spacewatch	·	1.3 km	MPC · JPL
254070	2004 HK_{42}	—	April 20, 2004	Socorro	LINEAR	·	2.8 km	MPC · JPL
254071	2004 HQ_{42}	—	April 20, 2004	Socorro	LINEAR	EUN	1.8 km	MPC · JPL
254072	2004 HZ_{50}	—	April 23, 2004	Siding Spring	SSS	·	2.8 km	MPC · JPL
254073	2004 HU_{52}	—	April 24, 2004	Kitt Peak	Spacewatch	H	660 m	MPC · JPL
254074	2004 HY_{58}	—	April 24, 2004	Kitt Peak	Spacewatch	·	1.7 km	MPC · JPL
254075	2004 HC_{65}	—	April 16, 2004	Palomar	NEAT	HNS	1.7 km	MPC · JPL
254076	2004 HS_{65}	—	April 17, 2004	Palomar	NEAT	·	3.8 km	MPC · JPL
254077	2004 HR_{66}	—	April 21, 2004	Kitt Peak	Spacewatch	·	2.4 km	MPC · JPL
254078	2004 HX_{66}	—	April 21, 2004	Kitt Peak	Spacewatch	·	2.4 km	MPC · JPL
254079	2004 HT_{78}	—	April 25, 2004	Kitt Peak	Spacewatch	L4	13 km	MPC · JPL
254080	2004 JW_{1}	—	May 10, 2004	Reedy Creek	J. Broughton	(194)	2.2 km	MPC · JPL
254081	2004 JF_{3}	—	May 9, 2004	Kitt Peak	Spacewatch	·	2.7 km	MPC · JPL
254082	2004 JU_{3}	—	May 9, 2004	Kitt Peak	Spacewatch	·	3.8 km	MPC · JPL
254083	2004 JX_{3}	—	May 9, 2004	Kitt Peak	Spacewatch	·	2.3 km	MPC · JPL
254084	2004 JA_{4}	—	May 9, 2004	Kitt Peak	Spacewatch	·	1.6 km	MPC · JPL
254085	2004 JJ_{8}	—	May 12, 2004	Catalina	CSS	·	4.2 km	MPC · JPL
254086	2004 JX_{8}	—	May 13, 2004	Palomar	NEAT	·	1.6 km	MPC · JPL
254087	2004 JJ_{10}	—	May 10, 2004	Palomar	NEAT	·	2.2 km	MPC · JPL
254088	2004 JK_{19}	—	May 13, 2004	Palomar	NEAT	HNS	1.9 km	MPC · JPL
254089	2004 JF_{25}	—	May 15, 2004	Socorro	LINEAR	·	2.3 km	MPC · JPL
254090	2004 JE_{26}	—	May 15, 2004	Socorro	LINEAR	·	2.4 km	MPC · JPL
254091	2004 JF_{27}	—	May 15, 2004	Socorro	LINEAR	·	2.5 km	MPC · JPL
254092	2004 JV_{27}	—	May 15, 2004	Siding Spring	SSS	·	1.7 km	MPC · JPL
254093	2004 JU_{28}	—	May 13, 2004	Palomar	NEAT	·	2.5 km	MPC · JPL
254094	2004 JE_{43}	—	May 15, 2004	Socorro	LINEAR	EUN	1.5 km	MPC · JPL
254095	2004 JS_{47}	—	May 13, 2004	Kitt Peak	Spacewatch	·	2.0 km	MPC · JPL
254096	2004 KC	—	May 16, 2004	Reedy Creek	J. Broughton	ADE	2.7 km	MPC · JPL
254097	2004 KE	—	May 16, 2004	Reedy Creek	J. Broughton	·	2.4 km	MPC · JPL
254098	2004 KT_{4}	—	May 18, 2004	Socorro	LINEAR	·	3.6 km	MPC · JPL
254099	2004 KR_{8}	—	May 18, 2004	Socorro	LINEAR	·	2.1 km	MPC · JPL
254100	2004 KH_{12}	—	May 21, 2004	Socorro	LINEAR	·	2.7 km	MPC · JPL

== 254101–254200 ==
back to top

Designation			Discovery			Properties		Ref
Permanent	Provisional	Named after	Date	Site	Discoverer(s)	Category	Diam.	Ref
254101	2004 KQ_{16}	—	May 27, 2004	Kitt Peak	Spacewatch	·	5.0 km	MPC · JPL
254102	2004 KV_{16}	—	May 27, 2004	Kitt Peak	Spacewatch	·	3.9 km	MPC · JPL
254103	2004 LF	—	June 6, 2004	Palomar	NEAT	H	780 m	MPC · JPL
254104	2004 LC_{10}	—	June 14, 2004	Reedy Creek	J. Broughton	·	2.3 km	MPC · JPL
254105	2004 LZ_{17}	—	June 14, 2004	Catalina	CSS	·	4.9 km	MPC · JPL
254106	2004 LY_{19}	—	June 11, 2004	Kitt Peak	Spacewatch	AEO	1.4 km	MPC · JPL
254107	2004 LA_{22}	—	June 13, 2004	Kitt Peak	Spacewatch	H	800 m	MPC · JPL
254108	2004 LS_{28}	—	June 14, 2004	Kitt Peak	Spacewatch	·	3.2 km	MPC · JPL
254109	2004 MR_{3}	—	June 17, 2004	Socorro	LINEAR	H	1.0 km	MPC · JPL
254110	2004 NV_{2}	—	July 1, 2004	Siding Spring	SSS	T_{j} (2.97)	4.0 km	MPC · JPL
254111	2004 NC_{4}	—	July 12, 2004	Palomar	NEAT	EUP	5.7 km	MPC · JPL
254112	2004 NY_{4}	—	July 9, 2004	Palomar	NEAT	(8737)	5.0 km	MPC · JPL
254113	2004 ND_{14}	—	July 11, 2004	Socorro	LINEAR	·	2.6 km	MPC · JPL
254114	2004 NX_{28}	—	July 14, 2004	Socorro	LINEAR	·	5.0 km	MPC · JPL
254115	2004 NF_{31}	—	July 11, 2004	Anderson Mesa	LONEOS	·	3.0 km	MPC · JPL
254116	2004 NL_{31}	—	July 11, 2004	Anderson Mesa	LONEOS	·	6.7 km	MPC · JPL
254117	2004 NL_{33}	—	July 13, 2004	Siding Spring	SSS	·	4.1 km	MPC · JPL
254118	2004 OM_{2}	—	July 16, 2004	Socorro	LINEAR	·	4.4 km	MPC · JPL
254119	2004 ON_{9}	—	July 20, 2004	Reedy Creek	J. Broughton	AEG	4.2 km	MPC · JPL
254120	2004 OX_{10}	—	July 27, 2004	Needville	J. Dellinger	·	1.7 km	MPC · JPL
254121	2004 OO_{12}	—	July 16, 2004	Campo Imperatore	CINEOS	·	3.4 km	MPC · JPL
254122	2004 OE_{15}	—	July 21, 2004	Siding Spring	SSS	·	3.0 km	MPC · JPL
254123	2004 PR_{1}	—	August 6, 2004	Reedy Creek	J. Broughton	EOS	2.9 km	MPC · JPL
254124	2004 PO_{3}	—	August 3, 2004	Siding Spring	SSS	·	4.5 km	MPC · JPL
254125	2004 PG_{10}	—	August 6, 2004	Campo Imperatore	CINEOS	·	2.3 km	MPC · JPL
254126	2004 PQ_{11}	—	August 7, 2004	Palomar	NEAT	·	4.5 km	MPC · JPL
254127	2004 PQ_{14}	—	August 7, 2004	Palomar	NEAT	·	3.9 km	MPC · JPL
254128	2004 PW_{14}	—	August 7, 2004	Palomar	NEAT	EOS	3.0 km	MPC · JPL
254129	2004 PX_{15}	—	August 7, 2004	Palomar	NEAT	·	4.1 km	MPC · JPL
254130	2004 PM_{16}	—	August 7, 2004	Palomar	NEAT	·	5.5 km	MPC · JPL
254131	2004 PT_{16}	—	August 7, 2004	Campo Imperatore	CINEOS	·	2.8 km	MPC · JPL
254132	2004 PW_{25}	—	August 8, 2004	Socorro	LINEAR	·	5.6 km	MPC · JPL
254133	2004 PH_{28}	—	August 6, 2004	Palomar	NEAT	·	4.1 km	MPC · JPL
254134	2004 PK_{40}	—	August 9, 2004	Socorro	LINEAR	EUP	7.3 km	MPC · JPL
254135	2004 PT_{43}	—	August 6, 2004	Palomar	NEAT	EOS	2.8 km	MPC · JPL
254136	2004 PH_{53}	—	August 8, 2004	Socorro	LINEAR	HYG	3.4 km	MPC · JPL
254137	2004 PN_{53}	—	August 8, 2004	Socorro	LINEAR	·	3.3 km	MPC · JPL
254138	2004 PD_{57}	—	August 9, 2004	Socorro	LINEAR	HYG	3.6 km	MPC · JPL
254139	2004 PL_{57}	—	August 9, 2004	Socorro	LINEAR	·	3.2 km	MPC · JPL
254140	2004 PR_{59}	—	August 9, 2004	Anderson Mesa	LONEOS	·	4.1 km	MPC · JPL
254141	2004 PT_{60}	—	August 9, 2004	Socorro	LINEAR	·	6.2 km	MPC · JPL
254142	2004 PV_{60}	—	August 9, 2004	Socorro	LINEAR	TIR	4.1 km	MPC · JPL
254143	2004 PN_{61}	—	August 9, 2004	Socorro	LINEAR	EOS · fast	2.8 km	MPC · JPL
254144	2004 PF_{66}	—	August 9, 2004	Socorro	LINEAR	·	3.0 km	MPC · JPL
254145	2004 PQ_{73}	—	August 8, 2004	Socorro	LINEAR	EOS	2.9 km	MPC · JPL
254146	2004 PD_{75}	—	August 8, 2004	Anderson Mesa	LONEOS	·	5.0 km	MPC · JPL
254147	2004 PB_{76}	—	August 9, 2004	Socorro	LINEAR	·	2.3 km	MPC · JPL
254148	2004 PU_{76}	—	August 9, 2004	Socorro	LINEAR	·	3.1 km	MPC · JPL
254149	2004 PB_{77}	—	August 9, 2004	Socorro	LINEAR	·	5.7 km	MPC · JPL
254150	2004 PV_{79}	—	August 9, 2004	Anderson Mesa	LONEOS	TIR	4.2 km	MPC · JPL
254151	2004 PR_{82}	—	August 10, 2004	Socorro	LINEAR	THM	4.6 km	MPC · JPL
254152	2004 PL_{83}	—	August 10, 2004	Socorro	LINEAR	·	3.0 km	MPC · JPL
254153	2004 PM_{86}	—	August 11, 2004	Socorro	LINEAR	·	4.0 km	MPC · JPL
254154	2004 PB_{87}	—	August 11, 2004	Socorro	LINEAR	EOS	2.8 km	MPC · JPL
254155	2004 PA_{88}	—	August 11, 2004	Socorro	LINEAR	THM	3.1 km	MPC · JPL
254156	2004 PL_{92}	—	August 12, 2004	Palomar	NEAT	·	4.9 km	MPC · JPL
254157	2004 PT_{92}	—	August 11, 2004	Wrightwood	J. W. Young	·	3.8 km	MPC · JPL
254158	2004 PR_{93}	—	August 7, 2004	Campo Imperatore	CINEOS	·	2.2 km	MPC · JPL
254159	2004 PC_{94}	—	August 9, 2004	Socorro	LINEAR	LIX	6.4 km	MPC · JPL
254160	2004 PK_{99}	—	August 10, 2004	Socorro	LINEAR	·	5.4 km	MPC · JPL
254161	2004 PG_{100}	—	August 12, 2004	Socorro	LINEAR	·	4.5 km	MPC · JPL
254162	2004 PH_{109}	—	August 12, 2004	Campo Imperatore	CINEOS	·	4.5 km	MPC · JPL
254163	2004 PY_{113}	—	August 8, 2004	Socorro	LINEAR	·	4.2 km	MPC · JPL
254164	2004 PP_{114}	—	August 11, 2004	Palomar	NEAT	·	3.9 km	MPC · JPL
254165	2004 QG_{2}	—	August 19, 2004	Reedy Creek	J. Broughton	·	4.0 km	MPC · JPL
254166	2004 QP_{5}	—	August 20, 2004	Wise	Wise	·	5.7 km	MPC · JPL
254167	2004 QO_{8}	—	August 16, 2004	Siding Spring	SSS	·	3.1 km	MPC · JPL
254168	2004 QM_{10}	—	August 21, 2004	Siding Spring	SSS	·	4.7 km	MPC · JPL
254169	2004 QW_{10}	—	August 21, 2004	Siding Spring	SSS	·	2.7 km	MPC · JPL
254170	2004 QX_{14}	—	August 21, 2004	Kvistaberg	Uppsala-DLR Asteroid Survey	EUP	6.0 km	MPC · JPL
254171	2004 QU_{17}	—	August 19, 2004	Socorro	LINEAR	·	5.6 km	MPC · JPL
254172	2004 QC_{27}	—	August 24, 2004	Socorro	LINEAR	T_{j} (2.97)	3.8 km	MPC · JPL
254173	2004 RT_{1}	—	September 4, 2004	Needville	Borgman, D., J. Dellinger	·	2.7 km	MPC · JPL
254174	2004 RG_{3}	—	September 6, 2004	Socorro	LINEAR	EUP	6.0 km	MPC · JPL
254175	2004 RT_{5}	—	September 4, 2004	Palomar	NEAT	·	4.9 km	MPC · JPL
254176	2004 RB_{6}	—	September 4, 2004	Palomar	NEAT	·	6.9 km	MPC · JPL
254177	2004 RA_{7}	—	September 5, 2004	Palomar	NEAT	·	5.1 km	MPC · JPL
254178	2004 RQ_{8}	—	September 6, 2004	Goodricke-Pigott	Goodricke-Pigott	·	3.0 km	MPC · JPL
254179	2004 RS_{12}	—	September 3, 2004	Anderson Mesa	LONEOS	·	3.6 km	MPC · JPL
254180	2004 RN_{15}	—	September 7, 2004	Socorro	LINEAR	·	3.5 km	MPC · JPL
254181	2004 RQ_{17}	—	September 7, 2004	Socorro	LINEAR	HYG	3.7 km	MPC · JPL
254182	2004 RM_{19}	—	September 7, 2004	Kitt Peak	Spacewatch	EOS	2.5 km	MPC · JPL
254183	2004 RM_{20}	—	September 7, 2004	Kitt Peak	Spacewatch	·	3.3 km	MPC · JPL
254184	2004 RH_{21}	—	September 7, 2004	Kitt Peak	Spacewatch	·	5.2 km	MPC · JPL
254185	2004 RO_{21}	—	September 7, 2004	Kitt Peak	Spacewatch	·	2.8 km	MPC · JPL
254186	2004 RG_{26}	—	September 6, 2004	Palomar	NEAT	·	3.4 km	MPC · JPL
254187	2004 RO_{36}	—	September 7, 2004	Socorro	LINEAR	·	5.8 km	MPC · JPL
254188	2004 RL_{37}	—	September 7, 2004	Socorro	LINEAR	·	4.4 km	MPC · JPL
254189	2004 RW_{37}	—	September 7, 2004	Socorro	LINEAR	HYG	3.4 km	MPC · JPL
254190	2004 RK_{39}	—	September 7, 2004	Kitt Peak	Spacewatch	KOR	2.3 km	MPC · JPL
254191	2004 RE_{41}	—	September 7, 2004	Kitt Peak	Spacewatch	·	5.0 km	MPC · JPL
254192	2004 RP_{41}	—	September 7, 2004	Kitt Peak	Spacewatch	ANF	2.1 km	MPC · JPL
254193	2004 RL_{43}	—	September 8, 2004	Socorro	LINEAR	EOS	2.8 km	MPC · JPL
254194	2004 RM_{44}	—	September 8, 2004	Socorro	LINEAR	·	5.0 km	MPC · JPL
254195	2004 RW_{44}	—	September 8, 2004	Socorro	LINEAR	HYG	3.3 km	MPC · JPL
254196	2004 RM_{46}	—	September 8, 2004	Socorro	LINEAR	·	4.9 km	MPC · JPL
254197	2004 RG_{47}	—	September 8, 2004	Socorro	LINEAR	·	3.4 km	MPC · JPL
254198	2004 RM_{48}	—	September 8, 2004	Socorro	LINEAR	·	2.6 km	MPC · JPL
254199	2004 RB_{57}	—	September 8, 2004	Socorro	LINEAR	·	4.8 km	MPC · JPL
254200	2004 RF_{58}	—	September 8, 2004	Socorro	LINEAR	·	4.6 km	MPC · JPL

== 254201–254300 ==
back to top

Designation			Discovery			Properties		Ref
Permanent	Provisional	Named after	Date	Site	Discoverer(s)	Category	Diam.	Ref
254201	2004 RB_{66}	—	September 8, 2004	Socorro	LINEAR	·	3.9 km	MPC · JPL
254202	2004 RU_{71}	—	September 8, 2004	Socorro	LINEAR	·	3.1 km	MPC · JPL
254203	2004 RL_{72}	—	September 8, 2004	Socorro	LINEAR	THM	2.8 km	MPC · JPL
254204	2004 RZ_{73}	—	September 8, 2004	Socorro	LINEAR	·	4.5 km	MPC · JPL
254205	2004 RW_{75}	—	September 8, 2004	Socorro	LINEAR	·	4.0 km	MPC · JPL
254206	2004 RQ_{78}	—	September 8, 2004	Socorro	LINEAR	·	4.2 km	MPC · JPL
254207	2004 RU_{83}	—	September 7, 2004	Socorro	LINEAR	·	7.9 km	MPC · JPL
254208	2004 RF_{87}	—	September 7, 2004	Palomar	NEAT	·	3.8 km	MPC · JPL
254209	2004 RP_{87}	—	September 7, 2004	Palomar	NEAT	·	4.1 km	MPC · JPL
254210	2004 RP_{89}	—	September 8, 2004	Socorro	LINEAR	EOS	3.0 km	MPC · JPL
254211	2004 RV_{89}	—	September 8, 2004	Socorro	LINEAR	·	3.2 km	MPC · JPL
254212	2004 RC_{90}	—	September 8, 2004	Socorro	LINEAR	URS	4.4 km	MPC · JPL
254213	2004 RT_{91}	—	September 8, 2004	Socorro	LINEAR	·	4.4 km	MPC · JPL
254214	2004 RU_{91}	—	September 8, 2004	Socorro	LINEAR	·	4.4 km	MPC · JPL
254215	2004 RO_{92}	—	September 8, 2004	Socorro	LINEAR	·	4.4 km	MPC · JPL
254216	2004 RX_{92}	—	September 8, 2004	Socorro	LINEAR	EOS	3.4 km	MPC · JPL
254217	2004 RY_{92}	—	September 8, 2004	Socorro	LINEAR	·	4.5 km	MPC · JPL
254218	2004 RC_{93}	—	September 8, 2004	Socorro	LINEAR	EOS	2.8 km	MPC · JPL
254219	2004 RZ_{93}	—	September 8, 2004	Socorro	LINEAR	·	4.2 km	MPC · JPL
254220	2004 RA_{94}	—	September 8, 2004	Socorro	LINEAR	EOS	2.7 km	MPC · JPL
254221	2004 RP_{94}	—	September 8, 2004	Socorro	LINEAR	fast	4.2 km	MPC · JPL
254222	2004 RY_{95}	—	September 8, 2004	Socorro	LINEAR	·	3.9 km	MPC · JPL
254223	2004 RX_{96}	—	September 8, 2004	Palomar	NEAT	EOS	2.5 km	MPC · JPL
254224	2004 RG_{97}	—	September 8, 2004	Palomar	NEAT	·	4.2 km	MPC · JPL
254225	2004 RK_{100}	—	September 8, 2004	Socorro	LINEAR	·	4.0 km	MPC · JPL
254226	2004 RM_{103}	—	September 8, 2004	Palomar	NEAT	EOS	3.4 km	MPC · JPL
254227	2004 RT_{103}	—	September 8, 2004	Palomar	NEAT	·	4.4 km	MPC · JPL
254228	2004 RD_{114}	—	September 7, 2004	Socorro	LINEAR	·	3.2 km	MPC · JPL
254229	2004 RZ_{114}	—	September 7, 2004	Socorro	LINEAR	THM	3.1 km	MPC · JPL
254230	2004 RJ_{116}	—	September 7, 2004	Socorro	LINEAR	·	6.4 km	MPC · JPL
254231	2004 RE_{117}	—	September 7, 2004	Kitt Peak	Spacewatch	·	2.6 km	MPC · JPL
254232	2004 RM_{117}	—	September 7, 2004	Kitt Peak	Spacewatch	·	3.4 km	MPC · JPL
254233	2004 RJ_{118}	—	September 7, 2004	Kitt Peak	Spacewatch	·	2.7 km	MPC · JPL
254234	2004 RW_{121}	—	September 7, 2004	Kitt Peak	Spacewatch	·	3.9 km	MPC · JPL
254235	2004 RD_{123}	—	September 7, 2004	Kitt Peak	Spacewatch	THM	4.2 km	MPC · JPL
254236	2004 RM_{126}	—	September 7, 2004	Kitt Peak	Spacewatch	·	2.8 km	MPC · JPL
254237	2004 RO_{133}	—	September 7, 2004	Kitt Peak	Spacewatch	THM	2.7 km	MPC · JPL
254238	2004 RG_{137}	—	September 8, 2004	Socorro	LINEAR	H	820 m	MPC · JPL
254239	2004 RC_{140}	—	September 8, 2004	Socorro	LINEAR	HYG	4.3 km	MPC · JPL
254240	2004 RF_{142}	—	September 8, 2004	Socorro	LINEAR	·	3.4 km	MPC · JPL
254241	2004 RH_{142}	—	September 8, 2004	Socorro	LINEAR	·	4.9 km	MPC · JPL
254242	2004 RC_{143}	—	September 8, 2004	Palomar	NEAT	·	4.6 km	MPC · JPL
254243	2004 RV_{143}	—	September 8, 2004	Socorro	LINEAR	·	4.0 km	MPC · JPL
254244	2004 RT_{147}	—	September 9, 2004	Socorro	LINEAR	·	4.4 km	MPC · JPL
254245	2004 RY_{147}	—	September 9, 2004	Socorro	LINEAR	·	6.2 km	MPC · JPL
254246	2004 RH_{153}	—	September 10, 2004	Socorro	LINEAR	·	5.4 km	MPC · JPL
254247	2004 RO_{154}	—	September 10, 2004	Socorro	LINEAR	·	4.6 km	MPC · JPL
254248	2004 RA_{155}	—	September 10, 2004	Socorro	LINEAR	·	4.3 km	MPC · JPL
254249	2004 RG_{156}	—	September 10, 2004	Socorro	LINEAR	·	4.9 km	MPC · JPL
254250	2004 RZ_{156}	—	September 10, 2004	Socorro	LINEAR	·	4.2 km	MPC · JPL
254251	2004 RV_{161}	—	September 11, 2004	Socorro	LINEAR	·	3.1 km	MPC · JPL
254252	2004 RH_{162}	—	September 11, 2004	Socorro	LINEAR	·	4.3 km	MPC · JPL
254253	2004 RM_{165}	—	September 12, 2004	Socorro	LINEAR	·	5.0 km	MPC · JPL
254254	2004 RM_{167}	—	September 7, 2004	Socorro	LINEAR	·	3.4 km	MPC · JPL
254255	2004 RL_{168}	—	September 8, 2004	Socorro	LINEAR	EUP	5.1 km	MPC · JPL
254256	2004 RV_{168}	—	September 8, 2004	Socorro	LINEAR	EOS	3.2 km	MPC · JPL
254257	2004 RJ_{170}	—	September 8, 2004	Palomar	NEAT	LIX	4.8 km	MPC · JPL
254258	2004 RV_{171}	—	September 9, 2004	Socorro	LINEAR	·	4.7 km	MPC · JPL
254259	2004 RK_{172}	—	September 9, 2004	Socorro	LINEAR	·	5.3 km	MPC · JPL
254260	2004 RA_{176}	—	September 10, 2004	Socorro	LINEAR	·	3.5 km	MPC · JPL
254261	2004 RA_{177}	—	September 10, 2004	Socorro	LINEAR	EOS	3.0 km	MPC · JPL
254262	2004 RM_{177}	—	September 10, 2004	Socorro	LINEAR	·	2.9 km	MPC · JPL
254263	2004 RD_{179}	—	September 10, 2004	Socorro	LINEAR	·	4.2 km	MPC · JPL
254264	2004 RM_{179}	—	September 10, 2004	Socorro	LINEAR	·	5.0 km	MPC · JPL
254265	2004 RW_{179}	—	September 10, 2004	Socorro	LINEAR	HYG	4.0 km	MPC · JPL
254266	2004 RY_{183}	—	September 10, 2004	Socorro	LINEAR	·	6.2 km	MPC · JPL
254267	2004 RV_{184}	—	September 10, 2004	Socorro	LINEAR	·	3.6 km	MPC · JPL
254268	2004 RB_{187}	—	September 10, 2004	Socorro	LINEAR	EOS	3.3 km	MPC · JPL
254269	2004 RA_{188}	—	September 10, 2004	Socorro	LINEAR	·	4.7 km	MPC · JPL
254270	2004 RZ_{188}	—	September 10, 2004	Socorro	LINEAR	·	4.1 km	MPC · JPL
254271	2004 RY_{190}	—	September 10, 2004	Socorro	LINEAR	·	4.3 km	MPC · JPL
254272	2004 RN_{192}	—	September 10, 2004	Socorro	LINEAR	·	3.9 km	MPC · JPL
254273	2004 RW_{193}	—	September 10, 2004	Socorro	LINEAR	·	4.1 km	MPC · JPL
254274	2004 RM_{198}	—	September 10, 2004	Socorro	LINEAR	EOS	2.4 km	MPC · JPL
254275	2004 RM_{199}	—	September 10, 2004	Kitt Peak	Spacewatch	·	2.6 km	MPC · JPL
254276	2004 RD_{202}	—	September 11, 2004	Socorro	LINEAR	·	3.5 km	MPC · JPL
254277	2004 RC_{205}	—	September 7, 2004	Palomar	NEAT	·	4.8 km	MPC · JPL
254278	2004 RE_{207}	—	September 11, 2004	Socorro	LINEAR	·	5.1 km	MPC · JPL
254279	2004 RA_{210}	—	September 11, 2004	Socorro	LINEAR	·	5.2 km	MPC · JPL
254280	2004 RN_{210}	—	September 11, 2004	Socorro	LINEAR	·	4.3 km	MPC · JPL
254281	2004 RZ_{210}	—	September 11, 2004	Socorro	LINEAR	·	3.5 km	MPC · JPL
254282	2004 RG_{213}	—	September 11, 2004	Socorro	LINEAR	·	4.2 km	MPC · JPL
254283	2004 RW_{214}	—	September 11, 2004	Socorro	LINEAR	·	5.5 km	MPC · JPL
254284	2004 RD_{217}	—	September 11, 2004	Socorro	LINEAR	·	7.3 km	MPC · JPL
254285	2004 RX_{217}	—	September 11, 2004	Socorro	LINEAR	·	5.6 km	MPC · JPL
254286	2004 RG_{219}	—	September 11, 2004	Socorro	LINEAR	·	4.4 km	MPC · JPL
254287	2004 RA_{225}	—	September 9, 2004	Socorro	LINEAR	·	3.5 km	MPC · JPL
254288	2004 RG_{236}	—	September 10, 2004	Socorro	LINEAR	·	3.7 km	MPC · JPL
254289	2004 RG_{238}	—	September 10, 2004	Kitt Peak	Spacewatch	·	3.6 km	MPC · JPL
254290	2004 RT_{242}	—	September 10, 2004	Kitt Peak	Spacewatch	·	4.3 km	MPC · JPL
254291	2004 RB_{254}	—	September 6, 2004	Palomar	NEAT	·	4.5 km	MPC · JPL
254292	2004 RC_{257}	—	September 9, 2004	Socorro	LINEAR	THM	3.1 km	MPC · JPL
254293	2004 RE_{266}	—	September 10, 2004	Kitt Peak	Spacewatch	·	2.2 km	MPC · JPL
254294	2004 RB_{267}	—	September 11, 2004	Kitt Peak	Spacewatch	VER	4.0 km	MPC · JPL
254295	2004 RJ_{267}	—	September 11, 2004	Kitt Peak	Spacewatch	·	3.2 km	MPC · JPL
254296	2004 RL_{269}	—	September 11, 2004	Kitt Peak	Spacewatch	·	3.0 km	MPC · JPL
254297	2004 RY_{284}	—	September 15, 2004	Kitt Peak	Spacewatch	CYB	6.2 km	MPC · JPL
254298	2004 RX_{286}	—	September 15, 2004	Socorro	LINEAR	·	4.2 km	MPC · JPL
254299 Shambleau	2004 RT_{288}	Shambleau	September 15, 2004	Saint-Sulpice	B. Christophe	·	2.4 km	MPC · JPL
254300	2004 RN_{289}	—	September 3, 2004	Siding Spring	SSS	TIR	4.7 km	MPC · JPL

== 254301–254400 ==
back to top

Designation			Discovery			Properties		Ref
Permanent	Provisional	Named after	Date	Site	Discoverer(s)	Category	Diam.	Ref
254301	2004 RA_{292}	—	September 10, 2004	Socorro	LINEAR	·	4.6 km	MPC · JPL
254302	2004 RA_{293}	—	September 11, 2004	Kitt Peak	Spacewatch	·	6.0 km	MPC · JPL
254303	2004 RJ_{293}	—	September 11, 2004	Socorro	LINEAR	THB	4.4 km	MPC · JPL
254304	2004 RN_{293}	—	September 11, 2004	Kitt Peak	Spacewatch	·	2.2 km	MPC · JPL
254305	2004 RA_{300}	—	September 11, 2004	Kitt Peak	Spacewatch	·	4.1 km	MPC · JPL
254306	2004 RU_{304}	—	September 12, 2004	Socorro	LINEAR	HYG	4.0 km	MPC · JPL
254307	2004 RM_{308}	—	September 13, 2004	Socorro	LINEAR	·	4.0 km	MPC · JPL
254308	2004 RN_{311}	—	September 14, 2004	Socorro	LINEAR	·	4.1 km	MPC · JPL
254309	2004 RM_{313}	—	September 15, 2004	Kitt Peak	Spacewatch	EOS	2.3 km	MPC · JPL
254310	2004 RW_{315}	—	September 15, 2004	Siding Spring	SSS	·	5.2 km	MPC · JPL
254311	2004 RX_{317}	—	September 12, 2004	Kitt Peak	Spacewatch	·	3.4 km	MPC · JPL
254312	2004 RZ_{317}	—	September 12, 2004	Kitt Peak	Spacewatch	·	3.6 km	MPC · JPL
254313	2004 RH_{319}	—	September 13, 2004	Socorro	LINEAR	·	4.0 km	MPC · JPL
254314	2004 RZ_{319}	—	September 13, 2004	Socorro	LINEAR	·	5.5 km	MPC · JPL
254315	2004 RA_{320}	—	September 13, 2004	Socorro	LINEAR	·	4.4 km	MPC · JPL
254316	2004 RT_{322}	—	September 13, 2004	Socorro	LINEAR	·	3.8 km	MPC · JPL
254317	2004 RG_{323}	—	September 13, 2004	Socorro	LINEAR	·	4.5 km	MPC · JPL
254318	2004 RY_{328}	—	September 15, 2004	Anderson Mesa	LONEOS	HYG	3.8 km	MPC · JPL
254319	2004 RR_{340}	—	September 7, 2004	Socorro	LINEAR	T_{j} (2.98) · EUP	6.6 km	MPC · JPL
254320	2004 RL_{342}	—	September 10, 2004	Socorro	LINEAR	·	4.0 km	MPC · JPL
254321	2004 RD_{346}	—	September 14, 2004	Socorro	LINEAR	·	2.7 km	MPC · JPL
254322	2004 RZ_{346}	—	September 13, 2004	Anderson Mesa	LONEOS	·	4.3 km	MPC · JPL
254323	2004 SR_{1}	—	September 16, 2004	Kitt Peak	Spacewatch	THM	3.1 km	MPC · JPL
254324	2004 SP_{3}	—	September 17, 2004	Socorro	LINEAR	·	3.9 km	MPC · JPL
254325	2004 ST_{3}	—	September 17, 2004	Socorro	LINEAR	·	3.9 km	MPC · JPL
254326	2004 SJ_{4}	—	September 17, 2004	Kitt Peak	Spacewatch	EOS	5.0 km	MPC · JPL
254327	2004 SW_{10}	—	September 16, 2004	Siding Spring	SSS	·	6.6 km	MPC · JPL
254328	2004 SF_{25}	—	September 21, 2004	Kitt Peak	Spacewatch	·	2.5 km	MPC · JPL
254329	2004 SW_{29}	—	September 17, 2004	Socorro	LINEAR	·	4.1 km	MPC · JPL
254330	2004 SS_{30}	—	September 17, 2004	Socorro	LINEAR	·	4.7 km	MPC · JPL
254331	2004 SO_{31}	—	September 17, 2004	Socorro	LINEAR	·	3.5 km	MPC · JPL
254332	2004 SW_{31}	—	September 17, 2004	Socorro	LINEAR	·	3.9 km	MPC · JPL
254333	2004 SB_{34}	—	September 17, 2004	Kitt Peak	Spacewatch	·	5.0 km	MPC · JPL
254334	2004 SV_{36}	—	September 17, 2004	Kitt Peak	Spacewatch	VER	3.2 km	MPC · JPL
254335	2004 SQ_{38}	—	September 17, 2004	Socorro	LINEAR	HYG	5.3 km	MPC · JPL
254336	2004 SS_{42}	—	September 18, 2004	Socorro	LINEAR	·	4.8 km	MPC · JPL
254337	2004 SV_{42}	—	September 18, 2004	Socorro	LINEAR	(1298)	4.5 km	MPC · JPL
254338	2004 SV_{44}	—	September 18, 2004	Socorro	LINEAR	·	5.3 km	MPC · JPL
254339	2004 SA_{45}	—	September 18, 2004	Socorro	LINEAR	THB	4.3 km	MPC · JPL
254340	2004 SW_{45}	—	September 18, 2004	Socorro	LINEAR	·	4.7 km	MPC · JPL
254341	2004 SK_{49}	—	September 21, 2004	Socorro	LINEAR	VER	4.3 km	MPC · JPL
254342	2004 SY_{52}	—	September 22, 2004	Socorro	LINEAR	EUP	4.1 km	MPC · JPL
254343	2004 SN_{58}	—	September 16, 2004	Anderson Mesa	LONEOS	T_{j} (2.99)	5.8 km	MPC · JPL
254344	2004 TE_{3}	—	October 4, 2004	Socorro	LINEAR	·	7.7 km	MPC · JPL
254345	2004 TO_{8}	—	October 6, 2004	Socorro	LINEAR	·	9.8 km	MPC · JPL
254346	2004 TQ_{19}	—	October 13, 2004	Goodricke-Pigott	R. A. Tucker	EOS	2.8 km	MPC · JPL
254347	2004 TA_{27}	—	October 4, 2004	Kitt Peak	Spacewatch	·	4.4 km	MPC · JPL
254348	2004 TF_{27}	—	October 4, 2004	Kitt Peak	Spacewatch	·	3.9 km	MPC · JPL
254349	2004 TF_{29}	—	October 4, 2004	Kitt Peak	Spacewatch	THM	3.6 km	MPC · JPL
254350	2004 TL_{32}	—	October 4, 2004	Kitt Peak	Spacewatch	·	3.8 km	MPC · JPL
254351	2004 TC_{33}	—	October 4, 2004	Kitt Peak	Spacewatch	·	3.9 km	MPC · JPL
254352	2004 TD_{39}	—	October 4, 2004	Kitt Peak	Spacewatch	·	4.8 km	MPC · JPL
254353	2004 TU_{40}	—	October 4, 2004	Kitt Peak	Spacewatch	THM	2.7 km	MPC · JPL
254354	2004 TM_{41}	—	October 4, 2004	Kitt Peak	Spacewatch	·	5.8 km	MPC · JPL
254355	2004 TT_{60}	—	October 5, 2004	Anderson Mesa	LONEOS	·	3.6 km	MPC · JPL
254356	2004 TZ_{60}	—	October 5, 2004	Anderson Mesa	LONEOS	·	4.2 km	MPC · JPL
254357	2004 TY_{62}	—	October 5, 2004	Kitt Peak	Spacewatch	·	3.7 km	MPC · JPL
254358	2004 TJ_{64}	—	October 5, 2004	Kitt Peak	Spacewatch	THM	3.1 km	MPC · JPL
254359	2004 TR_{67}	—	October 5, 2004	Anderson Mesa	LONEOS	·	3.0 km	MPC · JPL
254360	2004 TS_{70}	—	October 6, 2004	Kitt Peak	Spacewatch	·	1.8 km	MPC · JPL
254361	2004 TM_{72}	—	October 6, 2004	Kitt Peak	Spacewatch	·	4.3 km	MPC · JPL
254362	2004 TJ_{81}	—	October 5, 2004	Kitt Peak	Spacewatch	·	3.6 km	MPC · JPL
254363	2004 TS_{83}	—	October 5, 2004	Kitt Peak	Spacewatch	·	4.0 km	MPC · JPL
254364	2004 TS_{89}	—	October 5, 2004	Anderson Mesa	LONEOS	·	2.4 km	MPC · JPL
254365	2004 TW_{91}	—	October 5, 2004	Kitt Peak	Spacewatch	VER	3.3 km	MPC · JPL
254366	2004 TL_{94}	—	October 5, 2004	Kitt Peak	Spacewatch	THM	2.3 km	MPC · JPL
254367	2004 TO_{100}	—	October 6, 2004	Palomar	NEAT	CYB	5.3 km	MPC · JPL
254368	2004 TO_{115}	—	October 4, 2004	Kitt Peak	Spacewatch	·	4.0 km	MPC · JPL
254369	2004 TD_{116}	—	October 4, 2004	Apache Point	Apache Point	EOS	3.1 km	MPC · JPL
254370	2004 TA_{119}	—	October 6, 2004	Socorro	LINEAR	·	5.9 km	MPC · JPL
254371	2004 TJ_{121}	—	October 7, 2004	Anderson Mesa	LONEOS	·	4.0 km	MPC · JPL
254372	2004 TB_{124}	—	October 7, 2004	Socorro	LINEAR	·	6.1 km	MPC · JPL
254373	2004 TT_{124}	—	October 7, 2004	Socorro	LINEAR	·	4.8 km	MPC · JPL
254374	2004 TO_{128}	—	October 7, 2004	Socorro	LINEAR	·	3.5 km	MPC · JPL
254375	2004 TD_{136}	—	October 8, 2004	Anderson Mesa	LONEOS	URS	4.5 km	MPC · JPL
254376	2004 TN_{136}	—	October 8, 2004	Anderson Mesa	LONEOS	·	4.9 km	MPC · JPL
254377	2004 TJ_{137}	—	October 8, 2004	Anderson Mesa	LONEOS	·	5.2 km	MPC · JPL
254378	2004 TU_{148}	—	October 6, 2004	Kitt Peak	Spacewatch	·	3.3 km	MPC · JPL
254379	2004 TO_{150}	—	October 6, 2004	Kitt Peak	Spacewatch	·	5.7 km	MPC · JPL
254380	2004 TO_{153}	—	October 6, 2004	Kitt Peak	Spacewatch	·	3.9 km	MPC · JPL
254381	2004 TA_{157}	—	October 6, 2004	Kitt Peak	Spacewatch	·	5.7 km	MPC · JPL
254382	2004 TL_{170}	—	October 7, 2004	Socorro	LINEAR	·	5.0 km	MPC · JPL
254383	2004 TL_{179}	—	October 7, 2004	Kitt Peak	Spacewatch	·	4.1 km	MPC · JPL
254384	2004 TT_{181}	—	October 7, 2004	Kitt Peak	Spacewatch	·	2.5 km	MPC · JPL
254385	2004 TP_{185}	—	October 7, 2004	Kitt Peak	Spacewatch	·	3.2 km	MPC · JPL
254386	2004 TW_{209}	—	October 8, 2004	Kitt Peak	Spacewatch	·	4.0 km	MPC · JPL
254387	2004 TR_{210}	—	October 8, 2004	Kitt Peak	Spacewatch	·	4.0 km	MPC · JPL
254388	2004 TG_{211}	—	October 8, 2004	Kitt Peak	Spacewatch	·	2.7 km	MPC · JPL
254389	2004 TJ_{212}	—	October 8, 2004	Kitt Peak	Spacewatch	THM	2.9 km	MPC · JPL
254390	2004 TL_{220}	—	October 6, 2004	Socorro	LINEAR	·	5.4 km	MPC · JPL
254391	2004 TX_{222}	—	October 7, 2004	Palomar	NEAT	VER	3.6 km	MPC · JPL
254392	2004 TZ_{222}	—	October 7, 2004	Socorro	LINEAR	T_{j} (2.98) · EUP	5.5 km	MPC · JPL
254393	2004 TA_{223}	—	October 7, 2004	Socorro	LINEAR	·	4.7 km	MPC · JPL
254394	2004 TH_{223}	—	October 7, 2004	Socorro	LINEAR	·	6.7 km	MPC · JPL
254395	2004 TP_{226}	—	October 8, 2004	Kitt Peak	Spacewatch	·	3.6 km	MPC · JPL
254396	2004 TB_{230}	—	October 8, 2004	Socorro	LINEAR	·	6.9 km	MPC · JPL
254397	2004 TJ_{231}	—	October 8, 2004	Kitt Peak	Spacewatch	·	4.5 km	MPC · JPL
254398	2004 TP_{240}	—	October 10, 2004	Socorro	LINEAR	NAE	4.0 km	MPC · JPL
254399	2004 TZ_{240}	—	October 10, 2004	Socorro	LINEAR	(69559)	5.3 km	MPC · JPL
254400	2004 TZ_{244}	—	October 7, 2004	Kitt Peak	Spacewatch	V	1.0 km	MPC · JPL

== 254401–254500 ==
back to top

Designation			Discovery			Properties		Ref
Permanent	Provisional	Named after	Date	Site	Discoverer(s)	Category	Diam.	Ref
254401	2004 TQ_{252}	—	October 9, 2004	Kitt Peak	Spacewatch	·	4.5 km	MPC · JPL
254402	2004 TQ_{288}	—	October 10, 2004	Kitt Peak	Spacewatch	·	2.9 km	MPC · JPL
254403	2004 TS_{289}	—	October 10, 2004	Socorro	LINEAR	·	4.8 km	MPC · JPL
254404	2004 TF_{297}	—	October 11, 2004	Palomar	NEAT	·	5.2 km	MPC · JPL
254405	2004 TK_{299}	—	October 8, 2004	Anderson Mesa	LONEOS	·	6.9 km	MPC · JPL
254406	2004 TM_{322}	—	October 11, 2004	Kitt Peak	Spacewatch	·	4.9 km	MPC · JPL
254407	2004 TL_{324}	—	October 12, 2004	Kitt Peak	Spacewatch	·	4.8 km	MPC · JPL
254408	2004 TZ_{331}	—	October 9, 2004	Kitt Peak	Spacewatch	·	4.1 km	MPC · JPL
254409	2004 TN_{339}	—	October 13, 2004	Kitt Peak	Spacewatch	·	4.3 km	MPC · JPL
254410	2004 TL_{356}	—	October 14, 2004	Anderson Mesa	LONEOS	·	4.6 km	MPC · JPL
254411	2004 TG_{360}	—	October 10, 2004	Socorro	LINEAR	·	4.9 km	MPC · JPL
254412	2004 UE_{2}	—	October 18, 2004	Socorro	LINEAR	·	4.6 km	MPC · JPL
254413	2004 UF_{4}	—	October 16, 2004	Socorro	LINEAR	EUP	7.3 km	MPC · JPL
254414	2004 UR_{4}	—	October 16, 2004	Socorro	LINEAR	EUP	7.3 km	MPC · JPL
254415	2004 UF_{7}	—	October 21, 2004	Socorro	LINEAR	·	7.7 km	MPC · JPL
254416	2004 VK	—	November 2, 2004	Palomar	NEAT	·	4.2 km	MPC · JPL
254417	2004 VV	—	November 3, 2004	Catalina	CSS	APO +1km	1.3 km	MPC · JPL
254418	2004 VG_{32}	—	November 3, 2004	Kitt Peak	Spacewatch	·	3.6 km	MPC · JPL
254419	2004 VT_{60}	—	November 11, 2004	Catalina	CSS	AMO +1km	630 m	MPC · JPL
254420	2004 VY_{61}	—	November 6, 2004	Socorro	LINEAR	·	4.4 km	MPC · JPL
254421	2004 VE_{65}	—	November 10, 2004	Kitt Peak	Spacewatch	LIX	5.7 km	MPC · JPL
254422 Henrykent	2004 VR_{122}	Henrykent	November 9, 2004	Mauna Kea	P. A. Wiegert, Papadimos, A.	·	4.1 km	MPC · JPL
254423	2004 WE_{6}	—	November 19, 2004	Socorro	LINEAR	·	4.3 km	MPC · JPL
254424	2004 WO_{7}	—	November 19, 2004	Socorro	LINEAR	·	1.1 km	MPC · JPL
254425	2004 XW_{4}	—	December 2, 2004	Catalina	CSS	·	6.5 km	MPC · JPL
254426	2004 XA_{13}	—	December 8, 2004	Socorro	LINEAR	·	5.2 km	MPC · JPL
254427	2004 XY_{14}	—	December 8, 2004	Socorro	LINEAR	ELF	6.5 km	MPC · JPL
254428	2004 XF_{15}	—	December 8, 2004	Socorro	LINEAR	·	5.1 km	MPC · JPL
254429	2004 XH_{92}	—	December 11, 2004	Socorro	LINEAR	·	5.0 km	MPC · JPL
254430	2004 XY_{116}	—	December 12, 2004	Kitt Peak	Spacewatch	VER	4.0 km	MPC · JPL
254431	2004 XL_{162}	—	December 15, 2004	Socorro	LINEAR	·	1.1 km	MPC · JPL
254432	2004 YR_{13}	—	December 18, 2004	Mount Lemmon	Mount Lemmon Survey	V	830 m	MPC · JPL
254433	2004 YQ_{23}	—	December 18, 2004	Mount Lemmon	Mount Lemmon Survey	·	990 m	MPC · JPL
254434	2005 AQ_{5}	—	January 6, 2005	Catalina	CSS	·	790 m	MPC · JPL
254435	2005 AV_{11}	—	January 6, 2005	Catalina	CSS	·	820 m	MPC · JPL
254436	2005 AM_{13}	—	January 7, 2005	Socorro	LINEAR	·	980 m	MPC · JPL
254437	2005 AP_{20}	—	January 6, 2005	Socorro	LINEAR	·	1.1 km	MPC · JPL
254438	2005 AN_{28}	—	January 6, 2005	Catalina	CSS	PHO	2.9 km	MPC · JPL
254439	2005 AK_{37}	—	January 13, 2005	Kitt Peak	Spacewatch	·	1.1 km	MPC · JPL
254440	2005 AQ_{53}	—	January 13, 2005	Kitt Peak	Spacewatch	·	1.1 km	MPC · JPL
254441	2005 AD_{54}	—	January 13, 2005	Kitt Peak	Spacewatch	V	910 m	MPC · JPL
254442	2005 AZ_{61}	—	January 15, 2005	Kitt Peak	Spacewatch	·	1.0 km	MPC · JPL
254443	2005 AA_{65}	—	January 13, 2005	Kitt Peak	Spacewatch	·	1.4 km	MPC · JPL
254444	2005 AT_{67}	—	January 13, 2005	Socorro	LINEAR	·	1.2 km	MPC · JPL
254445	2005 AX_{76}	—	January 15, 2005	Kitt Peak	Spacewatch	·	1.2 km	MPC · JPL
254446	2005 BO_{4}	—	January 16, 2005	Socorro	LINEAR	·	940 m	MPC · JPL
254447	2005 BY_{5}	—	January 16, 2005	Socorro	LINEAR	·	920 m	MPC · JPL
254448	2005 BF_{10}	—	January 16, 2005	Kitt Peak	Spacewatch	·	1.2 km	MPC · JPL
254449	2005 BO_{19}	—	January 16, 2005	Kitt Peak	Spacewatch	·	1.0 km	MPC · JPL
254450	2005 BQ_{48}	—	January 19, 2005	Kitt Peak	Spacewatch	·	1.8 km	MPC · JPL
254451	2005 CL_{1}	—	February 1, 2005	Catalina	CSS	·	1.1 km	MPC · JPL
254452	2005 CZ_{1}	—	February 1, 2005	Palomar	NEAT	BAP	1.3 km	MPC · JPL
254453	2005 CT_{5}	—	February 1, 2005	Palomar	NEAT	·	1.0 km	MPC · JPL
254454	2005 CQ_{10}	—	February 1, 2005	Kitt Peak	Spacewatch	·	1.4 km	MPC · JPL
254455	2005 CA_{14}	—	February 2, 2005	Kitt Peak	Spacewatch	·	1.2 km	MPC · JPL
254456	2005 CF_{21}	—	February 2, 2005	Catalina	CSS	·	990 m	MPC · JPL
254457	2005 CC_{22}	—	February 3, 2005	Socorro	LINEAR	·	890 m	MPC · JPL
254458	2005 CD_{29}	—	February 1, 2005	Kitt Peak	Spacewatch	·	1.2 km	MPC · JPL
254459	2005 CG_{44}	—	February 2, 2005	Kitt Peak	Spacewatch	·	1.2 km	MPC · JPL
254460	2005 CD_{59}	—	February 2, 2005	Catalina	CSS	·	990 m	MPC · JPL
254461	2005 CT_{59}	—	February 2, 2005	Palomar	NEAT	·	1.0 km	MPC · JPL
254462	2005 CL_{60}	—	February 4, 2005	Socorro	LINEAR	·	930 m	MPC · JPL
254463	2005 CZ_{62}	—	February 9, 2005	Kitt Peak	Spacewatch	PHO	1.9 km	MPC · JPL
254464	2005 CE_{67}	—	February 9, 2005	Socorro	LINEAR	·	2.0 km	MPC · JPL
254465	2005 CC_{69}	—	February 9, 2005	La Silla	A. Boattini, H. Scholl	L4	9.1 km	MPC · JPL
254466	2005 DE_{1}	—	February 28, 2005	Catalina	CSS	·	2.6 km	MPC · JPL
254467	2005 DJ_{2}	—	February 16, 2005	La Silla	A. Boattini, H. Scholl	·	2.6 km	MPC · JPL
254468	2005 EB_{1}	—	March 1, 2005	Kitt Peak	Spacewatch	·	1.3 km	MPC · JPL
254469	2005 EG_{1}	—	March 1, 2005	Goodricke-Pigott	R. A. Tucker	·	1.2 km	MPC · JPL
254470	2005 EN_{4}	—	March 1, 2005	Catalina	CSS	·	1.1 km	MPC · JPL
254471	2005 EF_{5}	—	March 1, 2005	Kitt Peak	Spacewatch	·	1.1 km	MPC · JPL
254472	2005 ES_{6}	—	March 1, 2005	Kitt Peak	Spacewatch	MAS	990 m	MPC · JPL
254473	2005 EG_{7}	—	March 1, 2005	Kitt Peak	Spacewatch	·	1.5 km	MPC · JPL
254474	2005 ET_{9}	—	March 2, 2005	Kitt Peak	Spacewatch	·	1.5 km	MPC · JPL
254475	2005 ED_{11}	—	March 2, 2005	Kitt Peak	Spacewatch	·	1.4 km	MPC · JPL
254476	2005 EL_{11}	—	March 2, 2005	Catalina	CSS	·	1.9 km	MPC · JPL
254477	2005 ET_{11}	—	March 2, 2005	Catalina	CSS	·	1.3 km	MPC · JPL
254478	2005 EA_{12}	—	March 2, 2005	Catalina	CSS	·	1.2 km	MPC · JPL
254479	2005 EN_{12}	—	March 2, 2005	Catalina	CSS	V	990 m	MPC · JPL
254480	2005 EE_{13}	—	March 2, 2005	Catalina	CSS	NYS	1.2 km	MPC · JPL
254481	2005 EK_{13}	—	March 3, 2005	Kitt Peak	Spacewatch	·	810 m	MPC · JPL
254482	2005 EE_{14}	—	March 3, 2005	Kitt Peak	Spacewatch	·	1.7 km	MPC · JPL
254483	2005 EK_{18}	—	March 3, 2005	Catalina	CSS	·	1.1 km	MPC · JPL
254484	2005 ES_{19}	—	March 3, 2005	Kitt Peak	Spacewatch	NYS	1.5 km	MPC · JPL
254485	2005 ET_{20}	—	March 3, 2005	Catalina	CSS	·	980 m	MPC · JPL
254486	2005 EO_{26}	—	March 3, 2005	Catalina	CSS	·	940 m	MPC · JPL
254487	2005 EK_{28}	—	March 3, 2005	Catalina	CSS	·	1.4 km	MPC · JPL
254488	2005 EK_{32}	—	March 3, 2005	Catalina	CSS	·	980 m	MPC · JPL
254489	2005 ES_{32}	—	March 3, 2005	Catalina	CSS	·	2.2 km	MPC · JPL
254490	2005 EP_{33}	—	March 3, 2005	Kitt Peak	Spacewatch	3:2 · SHU	7.5 km	MPC · JPL
254491	2005 ET_{33}	—	March 3, 2005	Catalina	CSS	(2076)	1.2 km	MPC · JPL
254492	2005 ED_{35}	—	March 3, 2005	Kitt Peak	Spacewatch	(2076)	1.2 km	MPC · JPL
254493	2005 EQ_{42}	—	March 2, 2005	Catalina	CSS	·	1.0 km	MPC · JPL
254494	2005 EZ_{44}	—	March 3, 2005	Catalina	CSS	NYS	1.2 km	MPC · JPL
254495	2005 ED_{50}	—	March 3, 2005	Catalina	CSS	·	1.1 km	MPC · JPL
254496	2005 EG_{50}	—	March 3, 2005	Catalina	CSS	·	1.1 km	MPC · JPL
254497	2005 EJ_{51}	—	March 3, 2005	Catalina	CSS	·	1.4 km	MPC · JPL
254498	2005 EQ_{51}	—	March 3, 2005	Catalina	CSS	·	1.5 km	MPC · JPL
254499	2005 EB_{52}	—	March 3, 2005	Kitt Peak	Spacewatch	·	780 m	MPC · JPL
254500	2005 EF_{58}	—	March 4, 2005	Vail-Jarnac	Jarnac	·	1.0 km	MPC · JPL

== 254501–254600 ==
back to top

Designation			Discovery			Properties		Ref
Permanent	Provisional	Named after	Date	Site	Discoverer(s)	Category	Diam.	Ref
254501	2005 EU_{61}	—	March 4, 2005	Socorro	LINEAR	·	970 m	MPC · JPL
254502	2005 EH_{73}	—	March 3, 2005	Kitt Peak	Spacewatch	NYS	1.1 km	MPC · JPL
254503	2005 EQ_{73}	—	March 3, 2005	Kitt Peak	Spacewatch	·	1.8 km	MPC · JPL
254504	2005 EX_{75}	—	March 3, 2005	Kitt Peak	Spacewatch	·	3.0 km	MPC · JPL
254505	2005 ET_{76}	—	March 3, 2005	Kitt Peak	Spacewatch	·	790 m	MPC · JPL
254506	2005 EO_{78}	—	March 3, 2005	Catalina	CSS	·	1.9 km	MPC · JPL
254507	2005 EK_{79}	—	March 3, 2005	Catalina	CSS	·	2.5 km	MPC · JPL
254508	2005 EJ_{83}	—	March 4, 2005	Kitt Peak	Spacewatch	·	940 m	MPC · JPL
254509	2005 EM_{83}	—	March 4, 2005	Kitt Peak	Spacewatch	NYS	1.4 km	MPC · JPL
254510	2005 EA_{85}	—	March 4, 2005	Catalina	CSS	·	1.4 km	MPC · JPL
254511	2005 EP_{85}	—	March 4, 2005	Socorro	LINEAR	·	1.2 km	MPC · JPL
254512	2005 EG_{87}	—	March 4, 2005	Mount Lemmon	Mount Lemmon Survey	MAS	800 m	MPC · JPL
254513	2005 EL_{87}	—	March 4, 2005	Mount Lemmon	Mount Lemmon Survey	·	1.2 km	MPC · JPL
254514	2005 EV_{87}	—	March 4, 2005	Mount Lemmon	Mount Lemmon Survey	·	1.2 km	MPC · JPL
254515	2005 EA_{88}	—	March 7, 2005	Socorro	LINEAR	·	5.9 km	MPC · JPL
254516	2005 ER_{88}	—	March 8, 2005	Kitt Peak	Spacewatch	·	1.1 km	MPC · JPL
254517	2005 EE_{89}	—	March 8, 2005	Kitt Peak	Spacewatch	·	1.1 km	MPC · JPL
254518	2005 EX_{89}	—	March 8, 2005	Anderson Mesa	LONEOS	·	1.9 km	MPC · JPL
254519	2005 EK_{91}	—	March 8, 2005	Kitt Peak	Spacewatch	·	1.5 km	MPC · JPL
254520	2005 EE_{92}	—	March 8, 2005	Anderson Mesa	LONEOS	·	1.3 km	MPC · JPL
254521	2005 EU_{97}	—	March 3, 2005	Catalina	CSS	·	1.8 km	MPC · JPL
254522	2005 EC_{111}	—	March 4, 2005	Mount Lemmon	Mount Lemmon Survey	·	1.5 km	MPC · JPL
254523	2005 EC_{112}	—	March 4, 2005	Socorro	LINEAR	·	1.5 km	MPC · JPL
254524	2005 EL_{112}	—	March 4, 2005	Socorro	LINEAR	MAS	970 m	MPC · JPL
254525	2005 ES_{115}	—	March 4, 2005	Socorro	LINEAR	·	1.8 km	MPC · JPL
254526	2005 EK_{119}	—	March 7, 2005	Socorro	LINEAR	·	1.3 km	MPC · JPL
254527	2005 ES_{120}	—	March 8, 2005	Kitt Peak	Spacewatch	·	1.0 km	MPC · JPL
254528	2005 EM_{122}	—	March 8, 2005	Mount Lemmon	Mount Lemmon Survey	NYS	1.6 km	MPC · JPL
254529	2005 EB_{124}	—	March 8, 2005	Anderson Mesa	LONEOS	·	1.1 km	MPC · JPL
254530	2005 EB_{125}	—	March 8, 2005	Mount Lemmon	Mount Lemmon Survey	·	1.5 km	MPC · JPL
254531	2005 EK_{128}	—	March 9, 2005	Kitt Peak	Spacewatch	·	2.6 km	MPC · JPL
254532	2005 EP_{130}	—	March 9, 2005	Mount Lemmon	Mount Lemmon Survey	·	920 m	MPC · JPL
254533	2005 EF_{131}	—	March 9, 2005	Mount Lemmon	Mount Lemmon Survey	·	1.7 km	MPC · JPL
254534	2005 EV_{138}	—	March 9, 2005	Mount Lemmon	Mount Lemmon Survey	NYS	1.6 km	MPC · JPL
254535	2005 EM_{139}	—	March 9, 2005	Mount Lemmon	Mount Lemmon Survey	·	1.6 km	MPC · JPL
254536	2005 EJ_{146}	—	March 10, 2005	Mount Lemmon	Mount Lemmon Survey	PHO	1.2 km	MPC · JPL
254537	2005 EJ_{151}	—	March 10, 2005	Kitt Peak	Spacewatch	·	2.1 km	MPC · JPL
254538	2005 EN_{159}	—	March 9, 2005	Mount Lemmon	Mount Lemmon Survey	·	810 m	MPC · JPL
254539	2005 EU_{165}	—	March 11, 2005	Kitt Peak	Spacewatch	·	1.6 km	MPC · JPL
254540	2005 EK_{175}	—	March 8, 2005	Kitt Peak	Spacewatch	V	720 m	MPC · JPL
254541	2005 EC_{176}	—	March 8, 2005	Socorro	LINEAR	NYS	1.3 km	MPC · JPL
254542	2005 ET_{176}	—	March 8, 2005	Socorro	LINEAR	·	1.9 km	MPC · JPL
254543	2005 EJ_{182}	—	March 9, 2005	Anderson Mesa	LONEOS	·	1.9 km	MPC · JPL
254544	2005 EL_{188}	—	March 10, 2005	Mount Lemmon	Mount Lemmon Survey	·	4.0 km	MPC · JPL
254545	2005 EM_{208}	—	March 4, 2005	Kitt Peak	Spacewatch	·	960 m	MPC · JPL
254546	2005 EP_{217}	—	March 9, 2005	Mount Lemmon	Mount Lemmon Survey	·	1.5 km	MPC · JPL
254547	2005 EZ_{217}	—	March 9, 2005	Socorro	LINEAR	·	1.2 km	MPC · JPL
254548	2005 EA_{222}	—	March 4, 2005	Kitt Peak	Spacewatch	·	1.4 km	MPC · JPL
254549	2005 ED_{222}	—	March 4, 2005	Mount Lemmon	Mount Lemmon Survey	·	1.8 km	MPC · JPL
254550	2005 EU_{223}	—	March 12, 2005	Kitt Peak	Spacewatch	·	1.4 km	MPC · JPL
254551	2005 EP_{226}	—	March 9, 2005	Socorro	LINEAR	HYG	3.8 km	MPC · JPL
254552	2005 EF_{245}	—	March 11, 2005	Kitt Peak	Spacewatch	·	1.1 km	MPC · JPL
254553	2005 EO_{251}	—	March 10, 2005	Anderson Mesa	LONEOS	·	910 m	MPC · JPL
254554	2005 EB_{264}	—	March 13, 2005	Kitt Peak	Spacewatch	·	1.1 km	MPC · JPL
254555	2005 EV_{274}	—	March 7, 2005	Socorro	LINEAR	·	1.5 km	MPC · JPL
254556	2005 EH_{280}	—	March 10, 2005	Catalina	CSS	·	1.1 km	MPC · JPL
254557	2005 EB_{282}	—	March 10, 2005	Anderson Mesa	LONEOS	NYS	1.0 km	MPC · JPL
254558	2005 EE_{284}	—	March 11, 2005	Kitt Peak	Spacewatch	·	1.0 km	MPC · JPL
254559	2005 EH_{286}	—	March 5, 2005	Siding Spring	SSS	PHO	3.4 km	MPC · JPL
254560	2005 EH_{291}	—	March 10, 2005	Catalina	CSS	·	3.9 km	MPC · JPL
254561	2005 EU_{296}	—	March 9, 2005	Kitt Peak	M. W. Buie	·	1.4 km	MPC · JPL
254562	2005 EP_{324}	—	March 12, 2005	Kitt Peak	Spacewatch	MAS	990 m	MPC · JPL
254563	2005 EM_{329}	—	March 3, 2005	Catalina	CSS	V	930 m	MPC · JPL
254564	2005 ES_{329}	—	March 12, 2005	Anderson Mesa	LONEOS	·	1.8 km	MPC · JPL
254565	2005 FT_{1}	—	March 16, 2005	Mount Lemmon	Mount Lemmon Survey	·	850 m	MPC · JPL
254566	2005 FH_{2}	—	March 16, 2005	Goodricke-Pigott	R. A. Tucker	·	1.6 km	MPC · JPL
254567	2005 FQ_{2}	—	March 16, 2005	Socorro	LINEAR	·	1.6 km	MPC · JPL
254568	2005 FF_{6}	—	March 31, 2005	Anderson Mesa	LONEOS	·	990 m	MPC · JPL
254569	2005 FQ_{14}	—	March 30, 2005	Catalina	CSS	V	920 m	MPC · JPL
254570	2005 GZ	—	April 1, 2005	Ottmarsheim	Ottmarsheim	·	1.7 km	MPC · JPL
254571	2005 GR_{2}	—	April 1, 2005	Kitt Peak	Spacewatch	NYS	1.6 km	MPC · JPL
254572	2005 GX_{3}	—	April 1, 2005	Kitt Peak	Spacewatch	·	2.0 km	MPC · JPL
254573	2005 GU_{7}	—	April 1, 2005	Anderson Mesa	LONEOS	·	1.3 km	MPC · JPL
254574	2005 GZ_{11}	—	April 1, 2005	Anderson Mesa	LONEOS	·	5.4 km	MPC · JPL
254575	2005 GN_{12}	—	April 1, 2005	Anderson Mesa	LONEOS	NYS	1.4 km	MPC · JPL
254576	2005 GU_{19}	—	April 2, 2005	Mount Lemmon	Mount Lemmon Survey	MAS	970 m	MPC · JPL
254577	2005 GS_{30}	—	April 4, 2005	Mount Lemmon	Mount Lemmon Survey	MAS	920 m	MPC · JPL
254578	2005 GR_{31}	—	April 4, 2005	Socorro	LINEAR	NYS	1.7 km	MPC · JPL
254579	2005 GN_{36}	—	April 2, 2005	Mount Lemmon	Mount Lemmon Survey	BRA	1.8 km	MPC · JPL
254580	2005 GB_{41}	—	April 4, 2005	Socorro	LINEAR	·	1.5 km	MPC · JPL
254581	2005 GV_{41}	—	April 5, 2005	Mount Lemmon	Mount Lemmon Survey	·	1.1 km	MPC · JPL
254582	2005 GM_{43}	—	April 5, 2005	Anderson Mesa	LONEOS	·	1.5 km	MPC · JPL
254583	2005 GZ_{44}	—	April 5, 2005	Mount Lemmon	Mount Lemmon Survey	·	780 m	MPC · JPL
254584	2005 GV_{45}	—	April 5, 2005	Mount Lemmon	Mount Lemmon Survey	·	910 m	MPC · JPL
254585	2005 GX_{46}	—	April 5, 2005	Mount Lemmon	Mount Lemmon Survey	·	850 m	MPC · JPL
254586	2005 GF_{47}	—	April 5, 2005	Mount Lemmon	Mount Lemmon Survey	·	1.7 km	MPC · JPL
254587	2005 GM_{53}	—	April 2, 2005	Mount Lemmon	Mount Lemmon Survey	·	1.7 km	MPC · JPL
254588	2005 GD_{55}	—	April 5, 2005	Mount Lemmon	Mount Lemmon Survey	·	1.2 km	MPC · JPL
254589	2005 GT_{59}	—	April 1, 2005	Kitt Peak	Spacewatch	·	990 m	MPC · JPL
254590	2005 GL_{67}	—	April 2, 2005	Mount Lemmon	Mount Lemmon Survey	·	1.5 km	MPC · JPL
254591	2005 GJ_{69}	—	April 2, 2005	Mount Lemmon	Mount Lemmon Survey	EUN	1.6 km	MPC · JPL
254592	2005 GQ_{70}	—	April 4, 2005	Kitt Peak	Spacewatch	·	860 m	MPC · JPL
254593	2005 GG_{71}	—	April 4, 2005	Mount Lemmon	Mount Lemmon Survey	NYS	1.1 km	MPC · JPL
254594	2005 GR_{71}	—	April 4, 2005	Catalina	CSS	·	1.2 km	MPC · JPL
254595	2005 GV_{84}	—	April 4, 2005	Kitt Peak	Spacewatch	·	1.6 km	MPC · JPL
254596	2005 GK_{91}	—	April 6, 2005	Kitt Peak	Spacewatch	·	1.5 km	MPC · JPL
254597	2005 GM_{92}	—	April 6, 2005	Catalina	CSS	·	1.9 km	MPC · JPL
254598	2005 GF_{93}	—	April 6, 2005	Kitt Peak	Spacewatch	·	1.7 km	MPC · JPL
254599	2005 GG_{101}	—	April 9, 2005	Kitt Peak	Spacewatch	·	630 m	MPC · JPL
254600	2005 GE_{102}	—	April 9, 2005	Kitt Peak	Spacewatch	PHO	1.2 km	MPC · JPL

== 254601–254700 ==
back to top

Designation			Discovery			Properties		Ref
Permanent	Provisional	Named after	Date	Site	Discoverer(s)	Category	Diam.	Ref
254601	2005 GK_{116}	—	April 11, 2005	Kitt Peak	Spacewatch	·	960 m	MPC · JPL
254602	2005 GK_{119}	—	April 11, 2005	Mount Lemmon	Mount Lemmon Survey	·	1.5 km	MPC · JPL
254603	2005 GD_{124}	—	April 9, 2005	Kitt Peak	Spacewatch	·	1.5 km	MPC · JPL
254604	2005 GP_{129}	—	April 7, 2005	Kitt Peak	Spacewatch	·	1.9 km	MPC · JPL
254605	2005 GT_{134}	—	April 10, 2005	Mount Lemmon	Mount Lemmon Survey	MAS	780 m	MPC · JPL
254606	2005 GR_{137}	—	April 11, 2005	Mount Lemmon	Mount Lemmon Survey	·	1.5 km	MPC · JPL
254607	2005 GC_{139}	—	April 12, 2005	Socorro	LINEAR	MAS	980 m	MPC · JPL
254608	2005 GL_{146}	—	April 11, 2005	Kitt Peak	Spacewatch	·	2.8 km	MPC · JPL
254609	2005 GS_{150}	—	April 11, 2005	Kitt Peak	Spacewatch	·	2.6 km	MPC · JPL
254610	2005 GC_{153}	—	April 13, 2005	Anderson Mesa	LONEOS	·	1.5 km	MPC · JPL
254611	2005 GJ_{169}	—	April 12, 2005	Kitt Peak	Spacewatch	·	1.3 km	MPC · JPL
254612	2005 GZ_{178}	—	April 12, 2005	Kitt Peak	Spacewatch	NYS	1.7 km	MPC · JPL
254613	2005 GX_{182}	—	April 12, 2005	Kitt Peak	Spacewatch	V	960 m	MPC · JPL
254614	2005 GO_{203}	—	April 9, 2005	Mount Lemmon	Mount Lemmon Survey	·	820 m	MPC · JPL
254615	2005 GA_{226}	—	April 4, 2005	Catalina	CSS	·	1.6 km	MPC · JPL
254616	2005 HU	—	April 16, 2005	Kitt Peak	Spacewatch	V	950 m	MPC · JPL
254617	2005 HN_{1}	—	April 16, 2005	Kitt Peak	Spacewatch	·	1.4 km	MPC · JPL
254618	2005 HW_{4}	—	April 30, 2005	Kitt Peak	Spacewatch	·	2.0 km	MPC · JPL
254619	2005 JV_{4}	—	May 2, 2005	Kitt Peak	Spacewatch	EUN	1.6 km	MPC · JPL
254620	2005 JJ_{12}	—	May 4, 2005	Mauna Kea	Veillet, C.	·	1.4 km	MPC · JPL
254621	2005 JW_{16}	—	May 4, 2005	Palomar	NEAT	·	2.0 km	MPC · JPL
254622	2005 JN_{17}	—	May 4, 2005	Catalina	CSS	·	1.8 km	MPC · JPL
254623	2005 JB_{21}	—	May 4, 2005	Mount Lemmon	Mount Lemmon Survey	·	1.8 km	MPC · JPL
254624	2005 JZ_{25}	—	May 3, 2005	Kitt Peak	Spacewatch	·	1.9 km	MPC · JPL
254625	2005 JK_{31}	—	May 4, 2005	Anderson Mesa	LONEOS	·	1.5 km	MPC · JPL
254626	2005 JR_{31}	—	May 4, 2005	Palomar	NEAT	·	1.7 km	MPC · JPL
254627	2005 JR_{36}	—	May 4, 2005	Palomar	NEAT	MAS	1.0 km	MPC · JPL
254628	2005 JB_{41}	—	May 7, 2005	Mount Lemmon	Mount Lemmon Survey	V	910 m	MPC · JPL
254629	2005 JH_{50}	—	May 4, 2005	Kitt Peak	Spacewatch	·	1.4 km	MPC · JPL
254630	2005 JJ_{60}	—	May 8, 2005	Kitt Peak	Spacewatch	L4	10 km	MPC · JPL
254631	2005 JT_{62}	—	May 9, 2005	Mount Lemmon	Mount Lemmon Survey	NYS	1.3 km	MPC · JPL
254632	2005 JZ_{66}	—	May 4, 2005	Palomar	NEAT	·	1.7 km	MPC · JPL
254633	2005 JV_{67}	—	May 4, 2005	Palomar	NEAT	·	1.9 km	MPC · JPL
254634	2005 JE_{75}	—	May 8, 2005	Siding Spring	SSS	V	1.0 km	MPC · JPL
254635	2005 JU_{78}	—	May 10, 2005	Mount Lemmon	Mount Lemmon Survey	·	2.9 km	MPC · JPL
254636	2005 JN_{83}	—	May 8, 2005	Kitt Peak	Spacewatch	(5)	1.8 km	MPC · JPL
254637	2005 JX_{93}	—	May 4, 2005	Anderson Mesa	LONEOS	·	2.5 km	MPC · JPL
254638	2005 JY_{99}	—	May 9, 2005	Kitt Peak	Spacewatch	MAR	1.2 km	MPC · JPL
254639	2005 JO_{107}	—	May 12, 2005	Mount Lemmon	Mount Lemmon Survey	·	1.7 km	MPC · JPL
254640	2005 JU_{107}	—	May 12, 2005	Mount Lemmon	Mount Lemmon Survey	·	1.7 km	MPC · JPL
254641	2005 JW_{111}	—	May 9, 2005	Mount Lemmon	Mount Lemmon Survey	EUN	1.3 km	MPC · JPL
254642	2005 JL_{114}	—	May 10, 2005	Socorro	LINEAR	·	1.7 km	MPC · JPL
254643	2005 JP_{118}	—	May 10, 2005	Kitt Peak	Spacewatch	·	1.8 km	MPC · JPL
254644	2005 JC_{122}	—	May 10, 2005	Kitt Peak	Spacewatch	MAR	1.5 km	MPC · JPL
254645	2005 JS_{126}	—	May 12, 2005	Mount Lemmon	Mount Lemmon Survey	MAS	890 m	MPC · JPL
254646	2005 JO_{127}	—	May 12, 2005	Socorro	LINEAR	·	1.6 km	MPC · JPL
254647	2005 JJ_{130}	—	May 13, 2005	Socorro	LINEAR	NYS	1.7 km	MPC · JPL
254648	2005 JS_{133}	—	May 14, 2005	Kitt Peak	Spacewatch	·	2.3 km	MPC · JPL
254649	2005 JL_{134}	—	May 14, 2005	Mount Lemmon	Mount Lemmon Survey	·	880 m	MPC · JPL
254650	2005 JC_{137}	—	May 13, 2005	Kitt Peak	Spacewatch	·	1.3 km	MPC · JPL
254651	2005 JD_{141}	—	May 14, 2005	Mount Lemmon	Mount Lemmon Survey	V	860 m	MPC · JPL
254652	2005 JP_{145}	—	May 12, 2005	Palomar	NEAT	·	1.7 km	MPC · JPL
254653	2005 JY_{162}	—	May 8, 2005	Mount Lemmon	Mount Lemmon Survey	·	2.7 km	MPC · JPL
254654	2005 JS_{175}	—	May 2, 2005	Siding Spring	SSS	·	2.1 km	MPC · JPL
254655	2005 JL_{178}	—	May 11, 2005	Mount Lemmon	Mount Lemmon Survey	·	1.7 km	MPC · JPL
254656	2005 JA_{181}	—	May 10, 2005	Socorro	LINEAR	·	2.1 km	MPC · JPL
254657	2005 KG	—	May 17, 2005	Reedy Creek	J. Broughton	·	2.5 km	MPC · JPL
254658	2005 KZ	—	May 16, 2005	Kitt Peak	Spacewatch	BRG	1.7 km	MPC · JPL
254659	2005 KQ_{4}	—	May 17, 2005	Mount Lemmon	Mount Lemmon Survey	·	1.4 km	MPC · JPL
254660	2005 KS_{6}	—	May 19, 2005	Mount Lemmon	Mount Lemmon Survey	·	1.3 km	MPC · JPL
254661	2005 KJ_{7}	—	May 19, 2005	Palomar	NEAT	·	1.8 km	MPC · JPL
254662	2005 KC_{8}	—	May 20, 2005	Mount Lemmon	Mount Lemmon Survey	·	1.5 km	MPC · JPL
254663	2005 KU_{11}	—	May 30, 2005	Siding Spring	SSS	·	1.6 km	MPC · JPL
254664	2005 KA_{13}	—	May 28, 2005	Campo Imperatore	CINEOS	EUN	1.6 km	MPC · JPL
254665	2005 LZ_{3}	—	June 4, 2005	Reedy Creek	J. Broughton	·	3.0 km	MPC · JPL
254666	2005 LC_{4}	—	June 1, 2005	Kitt Peak	Spacewatch	JUN	1.5 km	MPC · JPL
254667	2005 LC_{6}	—	June 3, 2005	Siding Spring	SSS	EUN	1.8 km	MPC · JPL
254668	2005 LW_{15}	—	June 5, 2005	Kitt Peak	Spacewatch	·	1.6 km	MPC · JPL
254669	2005 LO_{19}	—	June 8, 2005	Kitt Peak	Spacewatch	L4	19 km	MPC · JPL
254670	2005 LR_{25}	—	June 8, 2005	Kitt Peak	Spacewatch	·	1.5 km	MPC · JPL
254671	2005 LG_{35}	—	June 10, 2005	Kitt Peak	Spacewatch	·	2.1 km	MPC · JPL
254672	2005 LG_{41}	—	June 12, 2005	Kitt Peak	Spacewatch	NYS	1.6 km	MPC · JPL
254673	2005 LT_{42}	—	June 14, 2005	Kitt Peak	Spacewatch	·	1.5 km	MPC · JPL
254674	2005 LN_{45}	—	June 13, 2005	Kitt Peak	Spacewatch	ADE	1.7 km	MPC · JPL
254675	2005 LK_{46}	—	June 13, 2005	Mount Lemmon	Mount Lemmon Survey	(5)	1.6 km	MPC · JPL
254676	2005 LR_{46}	—	June 13, 2005	Kitt Peak	Spacewatch	·	2.0 km	MPC · JPL
254677	2005 LB_{47}	—	June 13, 2005	Mount Lemmon	Mount Lemmon Survey	·	1.6 km	MPC · JPL
254678	2005 LK_{49}	—	June 11, 2005	Kitt Peak	Spacewatch	·	3.0 km	MPC · JPL
254679	2005 LU_{50}	—	June 13, 2005	Kitt Peak	Spacewatch	L4	10 km	MPC · JPL
254680	2005 LN_{53}	—	June 13, 2005	Mount Lemmon	Mount Lemmon Survey	·	2.0 km	MPC · JPL
254681	2005 MU_{3}	—	June 16, 2005	Kitt Peak	Spacewatch	L4	20 km	MPC · JPL
254682	2005 MW_{3}	—	June 16, 2005	Kitt Peak	Spacewatch	L4	11 km	MPC · JPL
254683	2005 MD_{4}	—	June 16, 2005	Kitt Peak	Spacewatch	·	1.1 km	MPC · JPL
254684	2005 MK_{4}	—	June 17, 2005	Kitt Peak	Spacewatch	·	1.4 km	MPC · JPL
254685	2005 MO_{9}	—	June 28, 2005	Kitt Peak	Spacewatch	·	3.3 km	MPC · JPL
254686	2005 MA_{15}	—	June 29, 2005	Palomar	NEAT	·	2.8 km	MPC · JPL
254687	2005 MS_{16}	—	June 27, 2005	Kitt Peak	Spacewatch	·	3.0 km	MPC · JPL
254688	2005 MS_{18}	—	June 28, 2005	Palomar	NEAT	·	2.3 km	MPC · JPL
254689	2005 MZ_{20}	—	June 30, 2005	Anderson Mesa	LONEOS	·	3.6 km	MPC · JPL
254690	2005 MD_{22}	—	June 30, 2005	Kitt Peak	Spacewatch	·	1.6 km	MPC · JPL
254691	2005 MG_{24}	—	June 29, 2005	Kitt Peak	Spacewatch	L4 · 006	10 km	MPC · JPL
254692	2005 MH_{24}	—	June 29, 2005	Palomar	NEAT	·	2.2 km	MPC · JPL
254693	2005 MB_{26}	—	June 28, 2005	Kitt Peak	Spacewatch	·	1.5 km	MPC · JPL
254694	2005 MD_{29}	—	June 29, 2005	Kitt Peak	Spacewatch	·	2.2 km	MPC · JPL
254695	2005 MW_{31}	—	June 28, 2005	Palomar	NEAT	·	2.2 km	MPC · JPL
254696	2005 MO_{32}	—	June 28, 2005	Palomar	NEAT	BRU	2.8 km	MPC · JPL
254697	2005 MD_{35}	—	June 30, 2005	Kitt Peak	Spacewatch	·	2.2 km	MPC · JPL
254698	2005 MZ_{35}	—	June 30, 2005	Kitt Peak	Spacewatch	·	1.9 km	MPC · JPL
254699	2005 MY_{38}	—	June 30, 2005	Kitt Peak	Spacewatch	·	2.3 km	MPC · JPL
254700	2005 MM_{40}	—	June 30, 2005	Kitt Peak	Spacewatch	·	2.1 km	MPC · JPL

== 254701–254800 ==
back to top

Designation			Discovery			Properties		Ref
Permanent	Provisional	Named after	Date	Site	Discoverer(s)	Category	Diam.	Ref
254701	2005 MA_{42}	—	June 28, 2005	Palomar	NEAT	·	3.5 km	MPC · JPL
254702	2005 MT_{45}	—	June 27, 2005	Palomar	NEAT	·	2.0 km	MPC · JPL
254703	2005 MA_{55}	—	June 30, 2005	Palomar	NEAT	·	1.4 km	MPC · JPL
254704	2005 NH	—	July 1, 2005	Anderson Mesa	LONEOS	·	3.9 km	MPC · JPL
254705	2005 ND_{3}	—	July 1, 2005	Palomar	NEAT	(194)	2.2 km	MPC · JPL
254706	2005 NF_{3}	—	July 1, 2005	Catalina	CSS	·	1.8 km	MPC · JPL
254707	2005 NR_{6}	—	July 4, 2005	Mount Lemmon	Mount Lemmon Survey	·	1.9 km	MPC · JPL
254708	2005 NU_{16}	—	July 2, 2005	Kitt Peak	Spacewatch	WIT	1.2 km	MPC · JPL
254709	2005 NR_{17}	—	July 3, 2005	Palomar	NEAT	·	3.2 km	MPC · JPL
254710	2005 NZ_{23}	—	July 4, 2005	Kitt Peak	Spacewatch	·	1.9 km	MPC · JPL
254711	2005 NR_{24}	—	July 4, 2005	Kitt Peak	Spacewatch	·	1.9 km	MPC · JPL
254712	2005 NT_{25}	—	July 4, 2005	Kitt Peak	Spacewatch	·	1.7 km	MPC · JPL
254713	2005 NU_{27}	—	July 5, 2005	Palomar	NEAT	·	2.8 km	MPC · JPL
254714	2005 NK_{33}	—	July 5, 2005	Kitt Peak	Spacewatch	·	1.9 km	MPC · JPL
254715	2005 NP_{33}	—	July 5, 2005	Kitt Peak	Spacewatch	·	2.4 km	MPC · JPL
254716	2005 NK_{37}	—	July 6, 2005	Kitt Peak	Spacewatch	AEO	2.1 km	MPC · JPL
254717	2005 NO_{39}	—	July 7, 2005	Reedy Creek	J. Broughton	·	3.6 km	MPC · JPL
254718	2005 NA_{40}	—	July 3, 2005	Palomar	NEAT	MAR	1.6 km	MPC · JPL
254719	2005 NL_{40}	—	July 3, 2005	Mount Lemmon	Mount Lemmon Survey	·	2.2 km	MPC · JPL
254720	2005 NL_{52}	—	July 10, 2005	Catalina	CSS	·	4.0 km	MPC · JPL
254721	2005 NL_{54}	—	July 10, 2005	Kitt Peak	Spacewatch	·	1.9 km	MPC · JPL
254722	2005 NJ_{61}	—	July 11, 2005	Kitt Peak	Spacewatch	·	3.2 km	MPC · JPL
254723	2005 NC_{62}	—	July 11, 2005	Kitt Peak	Spacewatch	·	1.9 km	MPC · JPL
254724	2005 NA_{63}	—	July 11, 2005	Mount Lemmon	Mount Lemmon Survey	·	2.6 km	MPC · JPL
254725	2005 NP_{64}	—	July 1, 2005	Kitt Peak	Spacewatch	·	1.4 km	MPC · JPL
254726	2005 NQ_{72}	—	July 7, 2005	Kitt Peak	Spacewatch	·	2.3 km	MPC · JPL
254727	2005 NB_{76}	—	July 10, 2005	Kitt Peak	Spacewatch	·	1.4 km	MPC · JPL
254728	2005 NU_{76}	—	July 10, 2005	Kitt Peak	Spacewatch	·	2.3 km	MPC · JPL
254729	2005 NZ_{79}	—	July 10, 2005	Reedy Creek	J. Broughton	·	2.0 km	MPC · JPL
254730	2005 NX_{84}	—	July 2, 2005	Catalina	CSS	·	3.4 km	MPC · JPL
254731	2005 NA_{85}	—	July 2, 2005	Catalina	CSS	·	4.2 km	MPC · JPL
254732	2005 NU_{93}	—	July 6, 2005	Kitt Peak	Spacewatch	·	1.9 km	MPC · JPL
254733	2005 NA_{94}	—	July 6, 2005	Kitt Peak	Spacewatch	·	3.4 km	MPC · JPL
254734	2005 NW_{101}	—	July 12, 2005	Mount Lemmon	Mount Lemmon Survey	NEM	2.5 km	MPC · JPL
254735	2005 OB_{5}	—	July 28, 2005	Palomar	NEAT	·	1.6 km	MPC · JPL
254736	2005 OJ_{6}	—	July 28, 2005	Palomar	NEAT	NEM	3.2 km	MPC · JPL
254737	2005 OY_{15}	—	July 29, 2005	Palomar	NEAT	·	1.6 km	MPC · JPL
254738	2005 OD_{16}	—	July 29, 2005	Palomar	NEAT	·	2.6 km	MPC · JPL
254739	2005 OK_{16}	—	July 29, 2005	Palomar	NEAT	·	3.0 km	MPC · JPL
254740	2005 OD_{17}	—	July 30, 2005	Palomar	NEAT	·	2.8 km	MPC · JPL
254741	2005 OO_{18}	—	July 30, 2005	Palomar	NEAT	MRX	1.5 km	MPC · JPL
254742	2005 OT_{18}	—	July 30, 2005	Palomar	NEAT	·	2.3 km	MPC · JPL
254743	2005 OB_{19}	—	July 31, 2005	Palomar	NEAT	·	2.1 km	MPC · JPL
254744	2005 OD_{22}	—	July 29, 2005	Palomar	NEAT	·	3.0 km	MPC · JPL
254745	2005 OT_{22}	—	July 28, 2005	Eskridge	Farpoint	·	1.9 km	MPC · JPL
254746	2005 OL_{28}	—	July 30, 2005	Palomar	NEAT	NEM	3.2 km	MPC · JPL
254747	2005 OB_{31}	—	July 31, 2005	Palomar	NEAT	·	2.2 km	MPC · JPL
254748	2005 PP_{1}	—	August 1, 2005	Siding Spring	SSS	·	2.7 km	MPC · JPL
254749 Kurosawa	2005 PE_{6}	Kurosawa	August 10, 2005	Saint-Sulpice	B. Christophe	(29841)	1.7 km	MPC · JPL
254750	2005 PS_{8}	—	August 4, 2005	Palomar	NEAT	·	2.6 km	MPC · JPL
254751	2005 PU_{12}	—	August 4, 2005	Palomar	NEAT	·	2.3 km	MPC · JPL
254752	2005 PC_{15}	—	August 4, 2005	Palomar	NEAT	AGN	1.4 km	MPC · JPL
254753	2005 PN_{15}	—	August 4, 2005	Palomar	NEAT	·	3.5 km	MPC · JPL
254754	2005 PO_{16}	—	August 10, 2005	Socorro	LINEAR	·	3.0 km	MPC · JPL
254755	2005 PG_{19}	—	August 4, 2005	Palomar	NEAT	·	2.5 km	MPC · JPL
254756	2005 QW_{1}	—	August 22, 2005	Palomar	NEAT	·	1.9 km	MPC · JPL
254757	2005 QA_{2}	—	August 22, 2005	Palomar	NEAT	·	3.0 km	MPC · JPL
254758	2005 QM_{3}	—	August 24, 2005	Palomar	NEAT	·	3.1 km	MPC · JPL
254759	2005 QX_{5}	—	August 24, 2005	Palomar	NEAT	·	1.8 km	MPC · JPL
254760	2005 QB_{8}	—	August 24, 2005	Palomar	NEAT	·	2.8 km	MPC · JPL
254761	2005 QR_{9}	—	August 24, 2005	Palomar	NEAT	·	2.1 km	MPC · JPL
254762	2005 QZ_{16}	—	August 25, 2005	Palomar	NEAT	AGN	1.5 km	MPC · JPL
254763	2005 QE_{21}	—	August 26, 2005	Anderson Mesa	LONEOS	·	2.3 km	MPC · JPL
254764	2005 QF_{24}	—	August 27, 2005	Kitt Peak	Spacewatch	·	3.2 km	MPC · JPL
254765	2005 QK_{24}	—	August 27, 2005	Kitt Peak	Spacewatch	·	2.4 km	MPC · JPL
254766	2005 QQ_{24}	—	August 27, 2005	Kitt Peak	Spacewatch	·	2.2 km	MPC · JPL
254767	2005 QZ_{25}	—	August 27, 2005	Kitt Peak	Spacewatch	KOR	1.6 km	MPC · JPL
254768	2005 QB_{32}	—	August 24, 2005	Palomar	NEAT	·	2.8 km	MPC · JPL
254769	2005 QL_{33}	—	August 25, 2005	Palomar	NEAT	·	3.4 km	MPC · JPL
254770	2005 QH_{37}	—	August 25, 2005	Palomar	NEAT	NEM	4.0 km	MPC · JPL
254771	2005 QQ_{37}	—	August 25, 2005	Palomar	NEAT	MRX	1.7 km	MPC · JPL
254772	2005 QW_{37}	—	August 25, 2005	Palomar	NEAT	·	2.3 km	MPC · JPL
254773	2005 QJ_{38}	—	August 25, 2005	Palomar	NEAT	·	2.9 km	MPC · JPL
254774	2005 QP_{40}	—	August 26, 2005	Palomar	NEAT	·	3.0 km	MPC · JPL
254775	2005 QZ_{41}	—	August 26, 2005	Anderson Mesa	LONEOS	BRA	2.2 km	MPC · JPL
254776	2005 QD_{43}	—	August 26, 2005	Palomar	NEAT	DOR	4.1 km	MPC · JPL
254777	2005 QP_{48}	—	August 26, 2005	Palomar	NEAT	·	2.4 km	MPC · JPL
254778	2005 QB_{49}	—	August 26, 2005	Palomar	NEAT	·	2.3 km	MPC · JPL
254779	2005 QJ_{49}	—	August 26, 2005	Palomar	NEAT	·	2.9 km	MPC · JPL
254780	2005 QH_{50}	—	August 26, 2005	Palomar	NEAT	·	3.4 km	MPC · JPL
254781	2005 QD_{52}	—	August 27, 2005	Anderson Mesa	LONEOS	·	2.1 km	MPC · JPL
254782	2005 QM_{54}	—	August 28, 2005	Kitt Peak	Spacewatch	·	1.8 km	MPC · JPL
254783	2005 QX_{60}	—	August 26, 2005	Palomar	NEAT	·	1.5 km	MPC · JPL
254784	2005 QC_{63}	—	August 26, 2005	Palomar	NEAT	PAD	1.9 km	MPC · JPL
254785	2005 QL_{64}	—	August 26, 2005	Palomar	NEAT	·	2.0 km	MPC · JPL
254786	2005 QE_{65}	—	August 26, 2005	Palomar	NEAT	·	2.0 km	MPC · JPL
254787	2005 QP_{65}	—	August 27, 2005	Anderson Mesa	LONEOS	·	4.2 km	MPC · JPL
254788	2005 QT_{66}	—	August 27, 2005	Anderson Mesa	LONEOS	·	3.3 km	MPC · JPL
254789	2005 QQ_{67}	—	August 28, 2005	Kitt Peak	Spacewatch	KOR	2.2 km	MPC · JPL
254790	2005 QJ_{74}	—	August 29, 2005	Anderson Mesa	LONEOS	·	4.5 km	MPC · JPL
254791	2005 QX_{77}	—	August 25, 2005	Palomar	NEAT	·	2.2 km	MPC · JPL
254792	2005 QV_{82}	—	August 29, 2005	Anderson Mesa	LONEOS	·	2.3 km	MPC · JPL
254793	2005 QZ_{82}	—	August 29, 2005	Anderson Mesa	LONEOS	·	2.0 km	MPC · JPL
254794	2005 QE_{84}	—	August 29, 2005	Anderson Mesa	LONEOS	PAD	2.4 km	MPC · JPL
254795	2005 QC_{86}	—	August 30, 2005	Kitt Peak	Spacewatch	·	3.7 km	MPC · JPL
254796	2005 QJ_{86}	—	August 30, 2005	Kitt Peak	Spacewatch	·	2.9 km	MPC · JPL
254797	2005 QO_{86}	—	August 30, 2005	Haleakala	NEAT	·	2.9 km	MPC · JPL
254798	2005 QJ_{90}	—	August 25, 2005	Palomar	NEAT	·	2.2 km	MPC · JPL
254799	2005 QT_{91}	—	August 26, 2005	Anderson Mesa	LONEOS	·	2.9 km	MPC · JPL
254800	2005 QS_{93}	—	August 26, 2005	Palomar	NEAT	·	2.5 km	MPC · JPL

== 254801–254900 ==
back to top

Designation			Discovery			Properties		Ref
Permanent	Provisional	Named after	Date	Site	Discoverer(s)	Category	Diam.	Ref
254801	2005 QT_{93}	—	August 26, 2005	Palomar	NEAT	·	1.8 km	MPC · JPL
254802	2005 QP_{94}	—	August 27, 2005	Palomar	NEAT	(16286)	2.6 km	MPC · JPL
254803	2005 QT_{102}	—	August 27, 2005	Palomar	NEAT	·	2.9 km	MPC · JPL
254804	2005 QA_{103}	—	August 27, 2005	Palomar	NEAT	PAD	2.5 km	MPC · JPL
254805	2005 QD_{104}	—	August 27, 2005	Palomar	NEAT	·	2.9 km	MPC · JPL
254806	2005 QT_{106}	—	August 27, 2005	Palomar	NEAT	·	2.3 km	MPC · JPL
254807	2005 QG_{109}	—	August 27, 2005	Palomar	NEAT	·	1.9 km	MPC · JPL
254808	2005 QW_{111}	—	August 27, 2005	Palomar	NEAT	·	3.4 km	MPC · JPL
254809	2005 QK_{112}	—	August 27, 2005	Palomar	NEAT	KOR	1.6 km	MPC · JPL
254810	2005 QG_{115}	—	August 27, 2005	Palomar	NEAT	·	2.6 km	MPC · JPL
254811	2005 QU_{116}	—	August 28, 2005	Kitt Peak	Spacewatch	·	2.0 km	MPC · JPL
254812	2005 QL_{117}	—	August 28, 2005	Kitt Peak	Spacewatch	·	1.9 km	MPC · JPL
254813	2005 QR_{121}	—	August 28, 2005	Kitt Peak	Spacewatch	·	2.4 km	MPC · JPL
254814	2005 QN_{124}	—	August 28, 2005	Kitt Peak	Spacewatch	KOR	1.6 km	MPC · JPL
254815	2005 QP_{124}	—	August 28, 2005	Kitt Peak	Spacewatch	KOR	1.4 km	MPC · JPL
254816	2005 QW_{124}	—	August 28, 2005	Kitt Peak	Spacewatch	KOR	1.5 km	MPC · JPL
254817	2005 QZ_{126}	—	August 28, 2005	Kitt Peak	Spacewatch	·	2.5 km	MPC · JPL
254818	2005 QQ_{129}	—	August 28, 2005	Kitt Peak	Spacewatch	HOF	2.7 km	MPC · JPL
254819	2005 QH_{131}	—	August 28, 2005	Kitt Peak	Spacewatch	·	1.6 km	MPC · JPL
254820	2005 QQ_{131}	—	August 28, 2005	Kitt Peak	Spacewatch	·	3.6 km	MPC · JPL
254821	2005 QZ_{135}	—	August 28, 2005	Kitt Peak	Spacewatch	·	2.3 km	MPC · JPL
254822	2005 QY_{137}	—	August 28, 2005	Kitt Peak	Spacewatch	·	2.7 km	MPC · JPL
254823	2005 QH_{140}	—	August 28, 2005	Kitt Peak	Spacewatch	·	2.5 km	MPC · JPL
254824	2005 QS_{141}	—	August 30, 2005	Kitt Peak	Spacewatch	·	2.8 km	MPC · JPL
254825	2005 QU_{145}	—	August 27, 2005	Palomar	NEAT	·	4.2 km	MPC · JPL
254826	2005 QW_{145}	—	August 27, 2005	Palomar	NEAT	·	3.2 km	MPC · JPL
254827	2005 QP_{150}	—	August 28, 2005	Siding Spring	SSS	·	2.0 km	MPC · JPL
254828	2005 QS_{150}	—	August 30, 2005	Kitt Peak	Spacewatch	EOS	1.9 km	MPC · JPL
254829	2005 QK_{151}	—	August 30, 2005	Kitt Peak	Spacewatch	·	1.7 km	MPC · JPL
254830	2005 QQ_{152}	—	August 26, 2005	Palomar	NEAT	·	3.4 km	MPC · JPL
254831	2005 QY_{155}	—	August 30, 2005	Palomar	NEAT	·	1.9 km	MPC · JPL
254832	2005 QW_{156}	—	August 30, 2005	Palomar	NEAT	·	5.5 km	MPC · JPL
254833	2005 QU_{165}	—	August 31, 2005	Palomar	NEAT	DOR	3.4 km	MPC · JPL
254834	2005 QX_{165}	—	August 31, 2005	Palomar	NEAT	·	2.4 km	MPC · JPL
254835	2005 QM_{170}	—	August 29, 2005	Palomar	NEAT	·	2.9 km	MPC · JPL
254836	2005 QH_{173}	—	August 29, 2005	Palomar	NEAT	·	3.6 km	MPC · JPL
254837	2005 QD_{174}	—	August 31, 2005	Anderson Mesa	LONEOS	GEF	1.9 km	MPC · JPL
254838	2005 QX_{174}	—	August 31, 2005	Socorro	LINEAR	·	4.6 km	MPC · JPL
254839	2005 QQ_{177}	—	August 29, 2005	Palomar	NEAT	·	2.9 km	MPC · JPL
254840	2005 QZ_{179}	—	August 26, 2005	Palomar	NEAT	·	2.3 km	MPC · JPL
254841	2005 QU_{180}	—	August 29, 2005	Anderson Mesa	LONEOS	·	2.7 km	MPC · JPL
254842	2005 QK_{182}	—	August 31, 2005	Kitt Peak	Spacewatch	AGN	1.4 km	MPC · JPL
254843	2005 QC_{190}	—	August 30, 2005	Kitt Peak	Spacewatch	AGN	1.3 km	MPC · JPL
254844	2005 QW_{190}	—	August 29, 2005	Palomar	NEAT	·	3.9 km	MPC · JPL
254845	2005 RX	—	September 1, 2005	Siding Spring	SSS	·	3.5 km	MPC · JPL
254846 Csontváry	2005 RT_{3}	Csontváry	September 5, 2005	Piszkéstető	K. Sárneczky	·	2.1 km	MPC · JPL
254847	2005 RG_{4}	—	September 3, 2005	Bergisch Gladbach	W. Bickel	·	2.9 km	MPC · JPL
254848	2005 RQ_{8}	—	September 8, 2005	Socorro	LINEAR	·	2.8 km	MPC · JPL
254849	2005 RE_{9}	—	September 9, 2005	Mayhill	Lowe, A.	·	3.3 km	MPC · JPL
254850	2005 RN_{16}	—	September 1, 2005	Anderson Mesa	LONEOS	BRA	2.1 km	MPC · JPL
254851	2005 RP_{16}	—	September 1, 2005	Anderson Mesa	LONEOS	·	1.8 km	MPC · JPL
254852	2005 RG_{20}	—	September 1, 2005	Kitt Peak	Spacewatch	AST	2.3 km	MPC · JPL
254853	2005 RN_{20}	—	September 1, 2005	Palomar	NEAT	GEF	1.7 km	MPC · JPL
254854	2005 RB_{23}	—	September 6, 2005	Socorro	LINEAR	·	2.2 km	MPC · JPL
254855	2005 RZ_{29}	—	September 9, 2005	Socorro	LINEAR	GEF	1.7 km	MPC · JPL
254856	2005 RP_{33}	—	September 14, 2005	Socorro	LINEAR	·	5.0 km	MPC · JPL
254857	2005 RT_{33}	—	September 12, 2005	Junk Bond	D. Healy	KOR	1.7 km	MPC · JPL
254858	2005 RG_{44}	—	September 3, 2005	Catalina	CSS	·	4.1 km	MPC · JPL
254859	2005 RH_{44}	—	September 3, 2005	Palomar	NEAT	EOS	2.3 km	MPC · JPL
254860	2005 RK_{45}	—	September 14, 2005	Catalina	CSS	·	3.4 km	MPC · JPL
254861	2005 RS_{51}	—	September 1, 2005	Palomar	NEAT	·	4.1 km	MPC · JPL
254862	2005 SU_{1}	—	September 23, 2005	Goodricke-Pigott	R. A. Tucker	·	3.0 km	MPC · JPL
254863 Robinwarren	2005 SM_{4}	Robinwarren	September 24, 2005	Vallemare Borbona	V. S. Casulli	·	2.5 km	MPC · JPL
254864	2005 SS_{5}	—	September 23, 2005	Catalina	CSS	PAD	2.3 km	MPC · JPL
254865	2005 SM_{7}	—	September 24, 2005	Kitt Peak	Spacewatch	KOR	1.7 km	MPC · JPL
254866	2005 SE_{8}	—	September 25, 2005	Catalina	CSS	·	2.9 km	MPC · JPL
254867	2005 SF_{11}	—	September 23, 2005	Kitt Peak	Spacewatch	AST	2.2 km	MPC · JPL
254868	2005 SO_{11}	—	September 23, 2005	Kitt Peak	Spacewatch	EOS	2.0 km	MPC · JPL
254869	2005 SP_{11}	—	September 23, 2005	Kitt Peak	Spacewatch	·	3.8 km	MPC · JPL
254870	2005 SR_{11}	—	September 23, 2005	Kitt Peak	Spacewatch	·	2.1 km	MPC · JPL
254871	2005 SE_{12}	—	September 23, 2005	Catalina	CSS	EOS	2.8 km	MPC · JPL
254872	2005 SA_{14}	—	September 24, 2005	Kitt Peak	Spacewatch	·	2.9 km	MPC · JPL
254873	2005 SU_{16}	—	September 26, 2005	Kitt Peak	Spacewatch	·	2.3 km	MPC · JPL
254874	2005 SG_{17}	—	September 26, 2005	Kitt Peak	Spacewatch	·	2.4 km	MPC · JPL
254875	2005 SW_{17}	—	September 26, 2005	Kitt Peak	Spacewatch	MIS	3.5 km	MPC · JPL
254876 Strommer	2005 ST_{19}	Strommer	September 24, 2005	Piszkéstető	K. Sárneczky	·	2.2 km	MPC · JPL
254877	2005 SQ_{22}	—	September 23, 2005	Kitt Peak	Spacewatch	·	2.5 km	MPC · JPL
254878	2005 SS_{22}	—	September 23, 2005	Kitt Peak	Spacewatch	·	2.5 km	MPC · JPL
254879	2005 SC_{25}	—	September 25, 2005	Catalina	CSS	·	3.3 km	MPC · JPL
254880	2005 SG_{27}	—	September 23, 2005	Kitt Peak	Spacewatch	·	3.2 km	MPC · JPL
254881	2005 SL_{27}	—	September 23, 2005	Kitt Peak	Spacewatch	·	2.5 km	MPC · JPL
254882	2005 SW_{29}	—	September 23, 2005	Kitt Peak	Spacewatch	·	2.5 km	MPC · JPL
254883	2005 SH_{30}	—	September 23, 2005	Kitt Peak	Spacewatch	·	2.7 km	MPC · JPL
254884	2005 SS_{30}	—	September 23, 2005	Catalina	CSS	GEF	1.9 km	MPC · JPL
254885	2005 SY_{31}	—	September 23, 2005	Kitt Peak	Spacewatch	KOR	1.7 km	MPC · JPL
254886	2005 SD_{32}	—	September 23, 2005	Kitt Peak	Spacewatch	·	3.0 km	MPC · JPL
254887	2005 SE_{35}	—	September 23, 2005	Kitt Peak	Spacewatch	·	3.6 km	MPC · JPL
254888	2005 SJ_{35}	—	September 23, 2005	Kitt Peak	Spacewatch	KOR	1.6 km	MPC · JPL
254889	2005 ST_{41}	—	September 24, 2005	Kitt Peak	Spacewatch	·	2.6 km	MPC · JPL
254890	2005 SV_{41}	—	September 24, 2005	Kitt Peak	Spacewatch	·	3.2 km	MPC · JPL
254891	2005 SP_{42}	—	September 24, 2005	Kitt Peak	Spacewatch	HOF	2.8 km	MPC · JPL
254892	2005 ST_{57}	—	September 26, 2005	Kitt Peak	Spacewatch	KOR	1.6 km	MPC · JPL
254893	2005 SA_{58}	—	September 26, 2005	Kitt Peak	Spacewatch	·	2.4 km	MPC · JPL
254894	2005 SD_{58}	—	September 26, 2005	Kitt Peak	Spacewatch	·	3.2 km	MPC · JPL
254895	2005 SN_{59}	—	September 26, 2005	Kitt Peak	Spacewatch	·	2.9 km	MPC · JPL
254896	2005 SN_{62}	—	September 26, 2005	Kitt Peak	Spacewatch	·	2.5 km	MPC · JPL
254897	2005 SA_{68}	—	September 27, 2005	Kitt Peak	Spacewatch	·	2.7 km	MPC · JPL
254898	2005 SX_{72}	—	September 23, 2005	Kitt Peak	Spacewatch	·	4.4 km	MPC · JPL
254899	2005 SF_{80}	—	September 24, 2005	Kitt Peak	Spacewatch	LIX	4.4 km	MPC · JPL
254900	2005 SM_{82}	—	September 24, 2005	Kitt Peak	Spacewatch	KOR	1.4 km	MPC · JPL

== 254901–255000 ==
back to top

Designation			Discovery			Properties		Ref
Permanent	Provisional	Named after	Date	Site	Discoverer(s)	Category	Diam.	Ref
254901	2005 SV_{82}	—	September 24, 2005	Kitt Peak	Spacewatch	KOR	1.6 km	MPC · JPL
254902	2005 SO_{83}	—	September 24, 2005	Kitt Peak	Spacewatch	EOS	2.0 km	MPC · JPL
254903	2005 SU_{84}	—	September 24, 2005	Kitt Peak	Spacewatch	KOR	1.6 km	MPC · JPL
254904	2005 SQ_{86}	—	September 24, 2005	Kitt Peak	Spacewatch	·	2.3 km	MPC · JPL
254905	2005 SW_{86}	—	September 24, 2005	Kitt Peak	Spacewatch	KOR	1.5 km	MPC · JPL
254906	2005 SC_{87}	—	September 24, 2005	Kitt Peak	Spacewatch	·	2.2 km	MPC · JPL
254907	2005 SS_{87}	—	September 24, 2005	Kitt Peak	Spacewatch	·	2.0 km	MPC · JPL
254908	2005 SP_{88}	—	September 24, 2005	Kitt Peak	Spacewatch	·	4.1 km	MPC · JPL
254909	2005 SL_{91}	—	September 24, 2005	Kitt Peak	Spacewatch	KOR	1.7 km	MPC · JPL
254910	2005 SK_{95}	—	September 25, 2005	Kitt Peak	Spacewatch	·	2.3 km	MPC · JPL
254911	2005 SN_{96}	—	September 25, 2005	Kitt Peak	Spacewatch	KOR	1.7 km	MPC · JPL
254912	2005 SO_{96}	—	September 25, 2005	Kitt Peak	Spacewatch	·	2.9 km	MPC · JPL
254913	2005 SF_{98}	—	September 25, 2005	Kitt Peak	Spacewatch	·	2.8 km	MPC · JPL
254914	2005 SG_{100}	—	September 25, 2005	Kitt Peak	Spacewatch	·	3.3 km	MPC · JPL
254915	2005 SO_{102}	—	September 25, 2005	Kitt Peak	Spacewatch	VER	4.3 km	MPC · JPL
254916	2005 SM_{106}	—	September 26, 2005	Kitt Peak	Spacewatch	·	2.1 km	MPC · JPL
254917	2005 SK_{107}	—	September 26, 2005	Catalina	CSS	·	2.9 km	MPC · JPL
254918	2005 SL_{108}	—	September 26, 2005	Kitt Peak	Spacewatch	KOR	1.6 km	MPC · JPL
254919	2005 SP_{111}	—	September 26, 2005	Kitt Peak	Spacewatch	·	3.3 km	MPC · JPL
254920	2005 SG_{116}	—	September 27, 2005	Kitt Peak	Spacewatch	EOS	2.1 km	MPC · JPL
254921	2005 SJ_{118}	—	September 28, 2005	Palomar	NEAT	PAD	2.5 km	MPC · JPL
254922	2005 SP_{119}	—	September 29, 2005	Kitt Peak	Spacewatch	HOF	3.6 km	MPC · JPL
254923	2005 SC_{121}	—	September 29, 2005	Kitt Peak	Spacewatch	(1298)	3.5 km	MPC · JPL
254924	2005 SL_{121}	—	September 29, 2005	Kitt Peak	Spacewatch	·	2.3 km	MPC · JPL
254925	2005 SW_{121}	—	September 29, 2005	Mount Lemmon	Mount Lemmon Survey	·	2.0 km	MPC · JPL
254926	2005 SS_{123}	—	September 29, 2005	Anderson Mesa	LONEOS	·	2.1 km	MPC · JPL
254927	2005 SJ_{124}	—	September 29, 2005	Anderson Mesa	LONEOS	GEF	1.7 km	MPC · JPL
254928	2005 SE_{129}	—	September 29, 2005	Mount Lemmon	Mount Lemmon Survey	·	2.2 km	MPC · JPL
254929	2005 SG_{135}	—	September 24, 2005	Kitt Peak	Spacewatch	KOR	1.4 km	MPC · JPL
254930	2005 SH_{135}	—	September 24, 2005	Kitt Peak	Spacewatch	·	1.7 km	MPC · JPL
254931	2005 SH_{136}	—	September 24, 2005	Kitt Peak	Spacewatch	·	2.6 km	MPC · JPL
254932	2005 SO_{136}	—	September 24, 2005	Kitt Peak	Spacewatch	·	2.2 km	MPC · JPL
254933	2005 SB_{140}	—	September 25, 2005	Kitt Peak	Spacewatch	MRX	1.2 km	MPC · JPL
254934	2005 SE_{141}	—	September 25, 2005	Kitt Peak	Spacewatch	·	1.9 km	MPC · JPL
254935	2005 SN_{146}	—	September 25, 2005	Kitt Peak	Spacewatch	EOS	2.7 km	MPC · JPL
254936	2005 SL_{151}	—	September 25, 2005	Kitt Peak	Spacewatch	·	2.8 km	MPC · JPL
254937	2005 SX_{152}	—	September 25, 2005	Kitt Peak	Spacewatch	EOS	2.3 km	MPC · JPL
254938	2005 SB_{157}	—	September 26, 2005	Kitt Peak	Spacewatch	TEL	1.8 km	MPC · JPL
254939	2005 SU_{159}	—	September 26, 2005	Palomar	NEAT	KON	3.5 km	MPC · JPL
254940	2005 SO_{161}	—	September 27, 2005	Kitt Peak	Spacewatch	KOR	1.3 km	MPC · JPL
254941	2005 SA_{162}	—	September 27, 2005	Kitt Peak	Spacewatch	AGN	1.9 km	MPC · JPL
254942	2005 SY_{163}	—	September 27, 2005	Palomar	NEAT	·	3.2 km	MPC · JPL
254943	2005 SR_{164}	—	September 27, 2005	Palomar	NEAT	·	3.2 km	MPC · JPL
254944	2005 SD_{172}	—	September 29, 2005	Kitt Peak	Spacewatch	·	2.4 km	MPC · JPL
254945	2005 SW_{178}	—	September 29, 2005	Anderson Mesa	LONEOS	AEO	1.4 km	MPC · JPL
254946	2005 SY_{183}	—	September 29, 2005	Kitt Peak	Spacewatch	·	2.8 km	MPC · JPL
254947	2005 SH_{184}	—	September 29, 2005	Kitt Peak	Spacewatch	·	2.6 km	MPC · JPL
254948	2005 SG_{187}	—	September 29, 2005	Anderson Mesa	LONEOS	DOR	3.1 km	MPC · JPL
254949	2005 SP_{192}	—	September 29, 2005	Mount Lemmon	Mount Lemmon Survey	·	2.3 km	MPC · JPL
254950	2005 SZ_{193}	—	September 29, 2005	Kitt Peak	Spacewatch	·	2.9 km	MPC · JPL
254951	2005 SB_{197}	—	September 30, 2005	Kitt Peak	Spacewatch	·	1.6 km	MPC · JPL
254952	2005 SE_{199}	—	September 30, 2005	Mount Lemmon	Mount Lemmon Survey	·	2.1 km	MPC · JPL
254953	2005 SV_{200}	—	September 30, 2005	Kitt Peak	Spacewatch	KOR	1.5 km	MPC · JPL
254954	2005 SC_{201}	—	September 30, 2005	Kitt Peak	Spacewatch	AGN	1.3 km	MPC · JPL
254955	2005 ST_{203}	—	September 30, 2005	Anderson Mesa	LONEOS	·	2.4 km	MPC · JPL
254956	2005 SQ_{205}	—	September 30, 2005	Palomar	NEAT	GEF	2.1 km	MPC · JPL
254957	2005 SM_{206}	—	September 30, 2005	Anderson Mesa	LONEOS	·	2.8 km	MPC · JPL
254958	2005 SY_{207}	—	September 30, 2005	Kitt Peak	Spacewatch	·	2.4 km	MPC · JPL
254959	2005 SA_{208}	—	September 30, 2005	Kitt Peak	Spacewatch	·	3.2 km	MPC · JPL
254960	2005 SG_{210}	—	September 30, 2005	Palomar	NEAT	·	3.4 km	MPC · JPL
254961	2005 SR_{210}	—	September 30, 2005	Palomar	NEAT	AGN	1.4 km	MPC · JPL
254962	2005 SH_{216}	—	September 30, 2005	Palomar	NEAT	·	2.8 km	MPC · JPL
254963	2005 SP_{217}	—	September 30, 2005	Palomar	NEAT	·	3.3 km	MPC · JPL
254964	2005 SR_{217}	—	September 30, 2005	Palomar	NEAT	·	2.8 km	MPC · JPL
254965	2005 SG_{226}	—	September 30, 2005	Kitt Peak	Spacewatch	·	2.9 km	MPC · JPL
254966	2005 SL_{226}	—	September 30, 2005	Kitt Peak	Spacewatch	·	1.9 km	MPC · JPL
254967	2005 SE_{228}	—	September 30, 2005	Mount Lemmon	Mount Lemmon Survey	·	1.9 km	MPC · JPL
254968	2005 SN_{229}	—	September 30, 2005	Mount Lemmon	Mount Lemmon Survey	·	2.4 km	MPC · JPL
254969	2005 SO_{229}	—	September 30, 2005	Mount Lemmon	Mount Lemmon Survey	·	1.4 km	MPC · JPL
254970	2005 SN_{237}	—	September 29, 2005	Kitt Peak	Spacewatch	TRE	3.8 km	MPC · JPL
254971	2005 SW_{240}	—	September 30, 2005	Kitt Peak	Spacewatch	·	2.6 km	MPC · JPL
254972	2005 SE_{245}	—	September 30, 2005	Mount Lemmon	Mount Lemmon Survey	·	2.7 km	MPC · JPL
254973	2005 SZ_{246}	—	September 30, 2005	Kitt Peak	Spacewatch	·	4.6 km	MPC · JPL
254974	2005 SG_{247}	—	September 30, 2005	Kitt Peak	Spacewatch	VER	3.9 km	MPC · JPL
254975	2005 SQ_{247}	—	September 30, 2005	Kitt Peak	Spacewatch	·	2.5 km	MPC · JPL
254976	2005 SN_{250}	—	September 23, 2005	Kitt Peak	Spacewatch	·	2.4 km	MPC · JPL
254977	2005 SL_{251}	—	September 24, 2005	Palomar	NEAT	·	2.6 km	MPC · JPL
254978	2005 ST_{252}	—	September 24, 2005	Palomar	NEAT	EOS	2.2 km	MPC · JPL
254979	2005 SG_{255}	—	September 22, 2005	Palomar	NEAT	·	2.8 km	MPC · JPL
254980	2005 SW_{255}	—	September 22, 2005	Palomar	NEAT	·	2.4 km	MPC · JPL
254981	2005 SV_{256}	—	September 22, 2005	Palomar	NEAT	·	4.2 km	MPC · JPL
254982	2005 SH_{257}	—	September 22, 2005	Palomar	NEAT	KOR	1.7 km	MPC · JPL
254983	2005 SG_{258}	—	September 23, 2005	Kitt Peak	Spacewatch	·	2.9 km	MPC · JPL
254984	2005 SJ_{258}	—	September 23, 2005	Kitt Peak	Spacewatch	KOR	1.9 km	MPC · JPL
254985	2005 SS_{260}	—	September 23, 2005	Kitt Peak	Spacewatch	AGN	1.7 km	MPC · JPL
254986	2005 SM_{262}	—	September 23, 2005	Anderson Mesa	LONEOS	526	3.0 km	MPC · JPL
254987	2005 SM_{265}	—	September 27, 2005	Kitt Peak	Spacewatch	·	2.8 km	MPC · JPL
254988	2005 SY_{266}	—	September 29, 2005	Anderson Mesa	LONEOS	·	2.6 km	MPC · JPL
254989	2005 SB_{267}	—	September 29, 2005	Mount Lemmon	Mount Lemmon Survey	·	2.1 km	MPC · JPL
254990	2005 SK_{268}	—	September 23, 2005	Kitt Peak	Spacewatch	DOR	3.9 km	MPC · JPL
254991	2005 SN_{280}	—	September 26, 2005	Kitt Peak	Spacewatch	·	3.6 km	MPC · JPL
254992	2005 SZ_{280}	—	September 29, 2005	Kitt Peak	Spacewatch	·	2.5 km	MPC · JPL
254993	2005 SX_{285}	—	September 25, 2005	Apache Point	A. C. Becker	·	1.8 km	MPC · JPL
254994	2005 TQ_{2}	—	October 1, 2005	Catalina	CSS	GEF	2.0 km	MPC · JPL
254995	2005 TC_{3}	—	October 1, 2005	Catalina	CSS	HOF	3.0 km	MPC · JPL
254996	2005 TT_{5}	—	October 1, 2005	Catalina	CSS	·	2.7 km	MPC · JPL
254997	2005 TZ_{6}	—	October 1, 2005	Catalina	CSS	·	3.3 km	MPC · JPL
254998	2005 TQ_{8}	—	October 1, 2005	Kitt Peak	Spacewatch	·	4.4 km	MPC · JPL
254999	2005 TS_{10}	—	October 2, 2005	Mount Lemmon	Mount Lemmon Survey	·	2.5 km	MPC · JPL
255000	2005 TW_{11}	—	October 1, 2005	Mount Lemmon	Mount Lemmon Survey	·	2.7 km	MPC · JPL

back to top

== See also ==
- Meanings of minor-planet names: 254001–255000
