= List of minor planets: 253001–254000 =

The following is a partial list of minor planets, running from minor-planet number 253001 through 254000, inclusive. The primary data for this and other partial lists is based on JPL's "Small-Body Orbital Elements" and data available from the Minor Planet Center. Critical list information is also provided by the MPC, unless otherwise specified from Lowell Observatory. A detailed description of the table's columns and additional sources are given on the main page including a complete list of every page in this series, and a statistical break-up on the dynamical classification of minor planets.

Also see the summary list of all named bodies in numerical and alphabetical order, and the corresponding naming citations for the number range of this particular list. New namings may only be added to this list after official publication, as the preannouncement of names is condemned by the Working Group for Small Bodies Nomenclature of the International Astronomical Union.

Near-Earth obj.	MBA (inner)	MBA (outer)	Centaur
Mars-crosser	MBA (middle)	Jupiter trojan	Trans-Neptunian obj.
Unclassified

== 253001–253100 ==
Designation			Discovery			Properties		Ref
Permanent	Provisional	Named after	Date	Site	Discoverer(s)	Category	Diam.	Ref
253001	2002 RS_{38}	—	September 5, 2002	Anderson Mesa	LONEOS	·	1.8 km	MPC · JPL
253002	2002 RU_{39}	—	September 5, 2002	Anderson Mesa	LONEOS	·	1.7 km	MPC · JPL
253003	2002 RN_{40}	—	September 5, 2002	Socorro	LINEAR	NYS	1.6 km	MPC · JPL
253004	2002 RQ_{40}	—	September 5, 2002	Socorro	LINEAR	·	1.8 km	MPC · JPL
253005	2002 RA_{47}	—	September 5, 2002	Socorro	LINEAR	·	1.8 km	MPC · JPL
253006	2002 RH_{66}	—	September 6, 2002	Socorro	LINEAR	H	650 m	MPC · JPL
253007	2002 RD_{81}	—	September 5, 2002	Socorro	LINEAR	3:2	6.0 km	MPC · JPL
253008	2002 RE_{97}	—	September 5, 2002	Socorro	LINEAR	(5)	1.6 km	MPC · JPL
253009	2002 RV_{99}	—	September 5, 2002	Socorro	LINEAR	H	740 m	MPC · JPL
253010	2002 RQ_{108}	—	September 5, 2002	Haleakala	NEAT	MAS	1.0 km	MPC · JPL
253011	2002 RN_{111}	—	September 6, 2002	Socorro	LINEAR	H	780 m	MPC · JPL
253012	2002 RD_{114}	—	September 5, 2002	Socorro	LINEAR	3:2	5.6 km	MPC · JPL
253013	2002 RX_{120}	—	September 7, 2002	Socorro	LINEAR	·	1.5 km	MPC · JPL
253014	2002 RC_{125}	—	September 7, 2002	Socorro	LINEAR	(5)	1.3 km	MPC · JPL
253015	2002 RP_{129}	—	September 11, 2002	Drebach	Drebach	·	1.3 km	MPC · JPL
253016	2002 RA_{161}	—	September 12, 2002	Palomar	NEAT	·	1.3 km	MPC · JPL
253017	2002 RA_{175}	—	September 13, 2002	Palomar	NEAT	·	1.5 km	MPC · JPL
253018	2002 RJ_{191}	—	September 13, 2002	Anderson Mesa	LONEOS	·	3.4 km	MPC · JPL
253019	2002 RC_{195}	—	September 12, 2002	Palomar	NEAT	·	1.7 km	MPC · JPL
253020	2002 RG_{195}	—	September 12, 2002	Palomar	NEAT	·	1.5 km	MPC · JPL
253021	2002 RH_{202}	—	September 13, 2002	Palomar	NEAT	·	1.9 km	MPC · JPL
253022	2002 RX_{230}	—	September 15, 2002	Haleakala	NEAT	·	1.9 km	MPC · JPL
253023	2002 RO_{241}	—	September 8, 2002	Haleakala	R. Matson	·	1.8 km	MPC · JPL
253024	2002 RU_{242}	—	September 14, 2002	Palomar	NEAT	·	2.1 km	MPC · JPL
253025	2002 RO_{245}	—	September 14, 2002	Palomar	NEAT	·	2.0 km	MPC · JPL
253026	2002 RZ_{247}	—	September 8, 2002	Haleakala	NEAT	HIL · 3:2	6.4 km	MPC · JPL
253027	2002 RJ_{253}	—	September 14, 2002	Palomar	NEAT	·	1.8 km	MPC · JPL
253028	2002 RE_{256}	—	September 13, 2002	Palomar	NEAT	·	1.7 km	MPC · JPL
253029	2002 RF_{261}	—	September 11, 2002	Palomar	NEAT	·	1.5 km	MPC · JPL
253030	2002 RV_{261}	—	September 13, 2002	Anderson Mesa	LONEOS	·	1.9 km	MPC · JPL
253031	2002 RJ_{262}	—	September 13, 2002	Palomar	NEAT	·	1.7 km	MPC · JPL
253032	2002 RN_{272}	—	September 4, 2002	Palomar	NEAT	·	1.4 km	MPC · JPL
253033	2002 RC_{275}	—	September 4, 2002	Palomar	NEAT	·	1.3 km	MPC · JPL
253034	2002 SU_{2}	—	September 27, 2002	Palomar	NEAT	H	730 m	MPC · JPL
253035	2002 SC_{7}	—	September 27, 2002	Palomar	NEAT	MAS	970 m	MPC · JPL
253036	2002 SP_{17}	—	September 26, 2002	Palomar	NEAT	·	930 m	MPC · JPL
253037	2002 SR_{19}	—	September 28, 2002	Goodricke-Pigott	R. A. Tucker	T_{j} (2.9) · 3:2	9.2 km	MPC · JPL
253038	2002 SD_{23}	—	September 27, 2002	Palomar	NEAT	·	2.0 km	MPC · JPL
253039	2002 SC_{24}	—	September 27, 2002	Anderson Mesa	LONEOS	NYS	1.3 km	MPC · JPL
253040	2002 SJ_{27}	—	September 29, 2002	Haleakala	NEAT	T_{j} (2.95)	5.8 km	MPC · JPL
253041	2002 SV_{32}	—	September 28, 2002	Haleakala	NEAT	T_{j} (2.98) · HIL · 3:2 · (6124)	6.4 km	MPC · JPL
253042	2002 SD_{35}	—	September 29, 2002	Haleakala	NEAT	H	730 m	MPC · JPL
253043	2002 SE_{37}	—	September 29, 2002	Haleakala	NEAT	3:2	4.1 km	MPC · JPL
253044	2002 SM_{41}	—	September 29, 2002	Haleakala	NEAT	·	1.1 km	MPC · JPL
253045	2002 SZ_{41}	—	September 28, 2002	Palomar	NEAT	NYS	1.5 km	MPC · JPL
253046	2002 SC_{51}	—	September 25, 2002	Kvistaberg	Uppsala-DLR Asteroid Survey	H	750 m	MPC · JPL
253047	2002 SG_{56}	—	September 30, 2002	Socorro	LINEAR	·	1.5 km	MPC · JPL
253048	2002 SG_{59}	—	September 16, 2002	Haleakala	NEAT	·	1.6 km	MPC · JPL
253049	2002 TD	—	October 1, 2002	Anderson Mesa	LONEOS	·	1.0 km	MPC · JPL
253050	2002 TG_{2}	—	October 1, 2002	Anderson Mesa	LONEOS	NYS	1.7 km	MPC · JPL
253051	2002 TV_{14}	—	October 1, 2002	Anderson Mesa	LONEOS	NYS	1.3 km	MPC · JPL
253052	2002 TN_{26}	—	October 2, 2002	Socorro	LINEAR	·	1.8 km	MPC · JPL
253053	2002 TX_{26}	—	October 2, 2002	Socorro	LINEAR	·	2.2 km	MPC · JPL
253054	2002 TJ_{42}	—	October 2, 2002	Socorro	LINEAR	·	1.5 km	MPC · JPL
253055	2002 TG_{46}	—	October 2, 2002	Socorro	LINEAR	H	750 m	MPC · JPL
253056	2002 TG_{48}	—	October 2, 2002	Socorro	LINEAR	·	1.8 km	MPC · JPL
253057	2002 TK_{48}	—	October 2, 2002	Socorro	LINEAR	·	1.9 km	MPC · JPL
253058	2002 TT_{59}	—	October 4, 2002	Socorro	LINEAR	H	690 m	MPC · JPL
253059	2002 TK_{66}	—	October 3, 2002	Socorro	LINEAR	H	940 m	MPC · JPL
253060	2002 TF_{68}	—	October 7, 2002	Socorro	LINEAR	H	1.1 km	MPC · JPL
253061	2002 TV_{69}	—	October 10, 2002	Eskridge	G. Hug	·	1.5 km	MPC · JPL
253062	2002 TC_{70}	—	October 10, 2002	Socorro	LINEAR	AMO	210 m	MPC · JPL
253063	2002 TY_{73}	—	October 3, 2002	Palomar	NEAT	·	1.9 km	MPC · JPL
253064	2002 TO_{80}	—	October 1, 2002	Anderson Mesa	LONEOS	(5)	1.3 km	MPC · JPL
253065	2002 TA_{84}	—	October 2, 2002	Haleakala	NEAT	·	2.0 km	MPC · JPL
253066	2002 TJ_{85}	—	October 2, 2002	Haleakala	NEAT	H	780 m	MPC · JPL
253067	2002 TZ_{93}	—	October 3, 2002	Socorro	LINEAR	·	1.2 km	MPC · JPL
253068	2002 TB_{96}	—	October 3, 2002	Palomar	NEAT	HIL · 3:2	8.3 km	MPC · JPL
253069	2002 TG_{110}	—	October 2, 2002	Haleakala	NEAT	·	850 m	MPC · JPL
253070	2002 TV_{113}	—	October 3, 2002	Palomar	NEAT	·	3.6 km	MPC · JPL
253071	2002 TG_{127}	—	October 4, 2002	Palomar	NEAT	·	2.1 km	MPC · JPL
253072	2002 TL_{127}	—	October 4, 2002	Palomar	NEAT	·	1.9 km	MPC · JPL
253073	2002 TL_{130}	—	October 4, 2002	Socorro	LINEAR	·	4.9 km	MPC · JPL
253074	2002 TK_{139}	—	October 4, 2002	Anderson Mesa	LONEOS	·	1.6 km	MPC · JPL
253075	2002 TD_{166}	—	October 3, 2002	Palomar	NEAT	·	2.6 km	MPC · JPL
253076	2002 TD_{167}	—	October 3, 2002	Palomar	NEAT	PHO	2.9 km	MPC · JPL
253077	2002 TJ_{183}	—	October 4, 2002	Socorro	LINEAR	·	1.8 km	MPC · JPL
253078	2002 TA_{184}	—	October 4, 2002	Socorro	LINEAR	·	2.2 km	MPC · JPL
253079	2002 TL_{205}	—	October 4, 2002	Socorro	LINEAR	·	1.7 km	MPC · JPL
253080	2002 TV_{206}	—	October 4, 2002	Socorro	LINEAR	·	1.3 km	MPC · JPL
253081	2002 TO_{208}	—	October 4, 2002	Socorro	LINEAR	·	1.2 km	MPC · JPL
253082	2002 TN_{210}	—	October 7, 2002	Socorro	LINEAR	T_{j} (2.97) · 3:2	6.9 km	MPC · JPL
253083	2002 TH_{212}	—	October 7, 2002	Haleakala	NEAT	·	2.3 km	MPC · JPL
253084	2002 TK_{222}	—	October 7, 2002	Socorro	LINEAR	·	1.3 km	MPC · JPL
253085	2002 TG_{227}	—	October 8, 2002	Anderson Mesa	LONEOS	EUN	1.5 km	MPC · JPL
253086	2002 TD_{237}	—	October 6, 2002	Socorro	LINEAR	·	2.3 km	MPC · JPL
253087	2002 TC_{242}	—	October 9, 2002	Anderson Mesa	LONEOS	PHO	1.4 km	MPC · JPL
253088	2002 TG_{247}	—	October 10, 2002	Palomar	NEAT	·	1.6 km	MPC · JPL
253089	2002 TE_{251}	—	October 7, 2002	Socorro	LINEAR	·	1.3 km	MPC · JPL
253090	2002 TY_{251}	—	October 8, 2002	Anderson Mesa	LONEOS	·	1.6 km	MPC · JPL
253091	2002 TZ_{251}	—	October 8, 2002	Anderson Mesa	LONEOS	·	2.0 km	MPC · JPL
253092	2002 TW_{260}	—	October 9, 2002	Socorro	LINEAR	·	2.4 km	MPC · JPL
253093	2002 TY_{263}	—	October 10, 2002	Socorro	LINEAR	H	810 m	MPC · JPL
253094	2002 TK_{267}	—	October 10, 2002	Socorro	LINEAR	HNS	1.7 km	MPC · JPL
253095	2002 TH_{270}	—	October 9, 2002	Socorro	LINEAR	V	1.1 km	MPC · JPL
253096	2002 TZ_{271}	—	October 9, 2002	Socorro	LINEAR	·	2.5 km	MPC · JPL
253097	2002 TS_{273}	—	October 9, 2002	Socorro	LINEAR	·	1.9 km	MPC · JPL
253098	2002 TH_{286}	—	October 10, 2002	Socorro	LINEAR	·	1.5 km	MPC · JPL
253099	2002 TC_{304}	—	October 4, 2002	Apache Point	SDSS	·	2.0 km	MPC · JPL
253100	2002 TA_{339}	—	October 5, 2002	Apache Point	SDSS	·	1.3 km	MPC · JPL

== 253101–253200 ==
back to top

Designation			Discovery			Properties		Ref
Permanent	Provisional	Named after	Date	Site	Discoverer(s)	Category	Diam.	Ref
253101	2002 TO_{354}	—	October 10, 2002	Apache Point	SDSS	·	1.3 km	MPC · JPL
253102	2002 TG_{377}	—	October 9, 2002	Palomar	NEAT	HIL · 3:2	6.8 km	MPC · JPL
253103	2002 TL_{383}	—	October 15, 2002	Palomar	NEAT	·	1.5 km	MPC · JPL
253104	2002 UP	—	October 25, 2002	Pla D'Arguines	D'Arguines, Pla	·	1.2 km	MPC · JPL
253105	2002 UW_{2}	—	October 28, 2002	Socorro	LINEAR	·	4.7 km	MPC · JPL
253106	2002 UR_{3}	—	October 29, 2002	Palomar	NEAT	APO +1km · slow	1.7 km	MPC · JPL
253107	2002 UK_{4}	—	October 28, 2002	Socorro	LINEAR	H	990 m	MPC · JPL
253108	2002 UO_{6}	—	October 28, 2002	Palomar	NEAT	·	2.0 km	MPC · JPL
253109	2002 UC_{12}	—	October 30, 2002	Socorro	LINEAR	H	1.0 km	MPC · JPL
253110	2002 US_{15}	—	October 30, 2002	Palomar	NEAT	·	1.4 km	MPC · JPL
253111	2002 UG_{17}	—	October 28, 2002	Haleakala	NEAT	·	1.3 km	MPC · JPL
253112	2002 UV_{27}	—	October 31, 2002	Palomar	NEAT	H	760 m	MPC · JPL
253113	2002 UN_{38}	—	October 31, 2002	Anderson Mesa	LONEOS	·	1.3 km	MPC · JPL
253114	2002 UD_{50}	—	October 31, 2002	Socorro	LINEAR	·	2.4 km	MPC · JPL
253115	2002 UW_{62}	—	October 30, 2002	Apache Point	SDSS	PHO	2.2 km	MPC · JPL
253116	2002 UX_{69}	—	October 29, 2002	Apache Point	SDSS	·	2.8 km	MPC · JPL
253117	2002 UU_{70}	—	October 31, 2002	Palomar	NEAT	·	2.0 km	MPC · JPL
253118	2002 US_{76}	—	October 16, 2002	Palomar	NEAT	·	1.2 km	MPC · JPL
253119	2002 UT_{78}	—	October 28, 2002	Palomar	NEAT	·	1.5 km	MPC · JPL
253120	2002 VT_{1}	—	November 2, 2002	La Palma	La Palma	·	1.1 km	MPC · JPL
253121	2002 VD_{4}	—	November 2, 2002	Haleakala	NEAT	·	1.9 km	MPC · JPL
253122	2002 VN_{8}	—	November 1, 2002	Palomar	NEAT	·	1.6 km	MPC · JPL
253123	2002 VG_{9}	—	November 1, 2002	Palomar	NEAT	·	1.5 km	MPC · JPL
253124	2002 VU_{11}	—	November 1, 2002	Palomar	NEAT	·	1.8 km	MPC · JPL
253125	2002 VY_{11}	—	November 1, 2002	Haleakala	NEAT	(5)	1.6 km	MPC · JPL
253126	2002 VV_{13}	—	November 3, 2002	Socorro	LINEAR	H	950 m	MPC · JPL
253127	2002 VA_{14}	—	November 5, 2002	Socorro	LINEAR	H	800 m	MPC · JPL
253128	2002 VP_{14}	—	November 6, 2002	Socorro	LINEAR	H	740 m	MPC · JPL
253129	2002 VQ_{15}	—	November 7, 2002	Socorro	LINEAR	H	870 m	MPC · JPL
253130	2002 VU_{19}	—	November 4, 2002	Powell	Powell	·	1.7 km	MPC · JPL
253131	2002 VJ_{20}	—	November 4, 2002	Haleakala	NEAT	·	1.2 km	MPC · JPL
253132	2002 VO_{23}	—	November 5, 2002	Socorro	LINEAR	(5)	2.5 km	MPC · JPL
253133	2002 VT_{25}	—	November 5, 2002	Socorro	LINEAR	·	1.1 km	MPC · JPL
253134	2002 VC_{30}	—	November 5, 2002	Socorro	LINEAR	·	3.5 km	MPC · JPL
253135	2002 VG_{40}	—	November 5, 2002	Fountain Hills	Hills, Fountain	·	1.2 km	MPC · JPL
253136	2002 VC_{43}	—	November 4, 2002	Palomar	NEAT	·	2.7 km	MPC · JPL
253137	2002 VF_{46}	—	November 5, 2002	Palomar	NEAT	·	1.3 km	MPC · JPL
253138	2002 VW_{46}	—	November 5, 2002	Palomar	NEAT	·	1.7 km	MPC · JPL
253139	2002 VU_{47}	—	November 5, 2002	Socorro	LINEAR	·	1.3 km	MPC · JPL
253140	2002 VL_{60}	—	November 3, 2002	Haleakala	NEAT	(5)	1.6 km	MPC · JPL
253141	2002 VW_{60}	—	November 4, 2002	Palomar	NEAT	KON	5.2 km	MPC · JPL
253142	2002 VP_{62}	—	November 5, 2002	Palomar	NEAT	·	2.0 km	MPC · JPL
253143	2002 VN_{63}	—	November 6, 2002	Anderson Mesa	LONEOS	LEO	2.5 km	MPC · JPL
253144	2002 VG_{67}	—	November 7, 2002	Socorro	LINEAR	·	1.4 km	MPC · JPL
253145	2002 VT_{71}	—	November 7, 2002	Socorro	LINEAR	·	1.6 km	MPC · JPL
253146	2002 VC_{72}	—	November 7, 2002	Socorro	LINEAR	·	1.2 km	MPC · JPL
253147	2002 VJ_{72}	—	November 7, 2002	Socorro	LINEAR	·	1.5 km	MPC · JPL
253148	2002 VQ_{76}	—	November 7, 2002	Socorro	LINEAR	·	1.9 km	MPC · JPL
253149	2002 VD_{79}	—	November 7, 2002	Socorro	LINEAR	V	1.1 km	MPC · JPL
253150	2002 VA_{80}	—	November 7, 2002	Socorro	LINEAR	(5)	2.0 km	MPC · JPL
253151	2002 VL_{80}	—	November 7, 2002	Socorro	LINEAR	·	1.3 km	MPC · JPL
253152	2002 VF_{84}	—	November 7, 2002	Socorro	LINEAR	·	3.0 km	MPC · JPL
253153	2002 VM_{94}	—	November 12, 2002	Socorro	LINEAR	slow	2.0 km	MPC · JPL
253154	2002 VB_{103}	—	November 12, 2002	Socorro	LINEAR	·	1.1 km	MPC · JPL
253155	2002 VV_{103}	—	November 12, 2002	Socorro	LINEAR	·	2.1 km	MPC · JPL
253156	2002 VJ_{109}	—	November 12, 2002	Socorro	LINEAR	·	2.6 km	MPC · JPL
253157	2002 VN_{109}	—	November 12, 2002	Socorro	LINEAR	·	1.7 km	MPC · JPL
253158	2002 VU_{120}	—	November 12, 2002	Palomar	NEAT	·	2.8 km	MPC · JPL
253159	2002 VJ_{121}	—	November 12, 2002	Palomar	NEAT	·	3.6 km	MPC · JPL
253160	2002 VL_{121}	—	November 12, 2002	Palomar	NEAT	·	2.3 km	MPC · JPL
253161	2002 VL_{123}	—	November 13, 2002	Palomar	NEAT	(5)	1.3 km	MPC · JPL
253162	2002 VK_{136}	—	November 11, 2002	Socorro	LINEAR	H	940 m	MPC · JPL
253163	2002 VQ_{146}	—	November 4, 2002	Palomar	NEAT	(5)	1.2 km	MPC · JPL
253164	2002 WV	—	November 21, 2002	Palomar	NEAT	·	2.1 km	MPC · JPL
253165	2002 WV_{14}	—	November 28, 2002	Anderson Mesa	LONEOS	·	2.0 km	MPC · JPL
253166	2002 WV_{15}	—	November 28, 2002	Anderson Mesa	LONEOS	RAF	1.1 km	MPC · JPL
253167	2002 WY_{15}	—	November 28, 2002	Anderson Mesa	LONEOS	·	1.9 km	MPC · JPL
253168	2002 WL_{16}	—	November 28, 2002	Haleakala	NEAT	·	2.2 km	MPC · JPL
253169	2002 WS_{17}	—	November 30, 2002	Socorro	LINEAR	·	2.0 km	MPC · JPL
253170	2002 WJ_{19}	—	November 25, 2002	Palomar	S. F. Hönig	·	1.4 km	MPC · JPL
253171	2002 WP_{24}	—	November 16, 2002	Palomar	NEAT	·	1.6 km	MPC · JPL
253172	2002 WJ_{25}	—	November 25, 2002	Palomar	NEAT	·	1.8 km	MPC · JPL
253173	2002 WV_{25}	—	November 16, 2002	Palomar	NEAT	·	1.5 km	MPC · JPL
253174	2002 XQ_{1}	—	December 1, 2002	Socorro	LINEAR	·	1.9 km	MPC · JPL
253175	2002 XK_{2}	—	December 1, 2002	Socorro	LINEAR	(5)	1.3 km	MPC · JPL
253176	2002 XD_{3}	—	December 1, 2002	Socorro	LINEAR	·	1.7 km	MPC · JPL
253177	2002 XS_{9}	—	December 2, 2002	Socorro	LINEAR	·	1.7 km	MPC · JPL
253178	2002 XY_{9}	—	December 2, 2002	Socorro	LINEAR	·	2.7 km	MPC · JPL
253179	2002 XU_{11}	—	December 3, 2002	Palomar	NEAT	·	2.2 km	MPC · JPL
253180	2002 XK_{13}	—	December 3, 2002	Haleakala	NEAT	·	1.5 km	MPC · JPL
253181	2002 XP_{16}	—	December 3, 2002	Palomar	NEAT	·	2.2 km	MPC · JPL
253182	2002 XX_{16}	—	December 3, 2002	Palomar	NEAT	·	2.4 km	MPC · JPL
253183	2002 XK_{18}	—	December 5, 2002	Socorro	LINEAR	ADE	3.8 km	MPC · JPL
253184	2002 XT_{18}	—	December 5, 2002	Socorro	LINEAR	·	1.6 km	MPC · JPL
253185	2002 XC_{22}	—	December 3, 2002	Palomar	NEAT	·	2.0 km	MPC · JPL
253186	2002 XH_{24}	—	December 5, 2002	Socorro	LINEAR	EUN	1.6 km	MPC · JPL
253187	2002 XX_{25}	—	December 5, 2002	Socorro	LINEAR	·	1.9 km	MPC · JPL
253188	2002 XW_{26}	—	December 3, 2002	Palomar	NEAT	·	1.6 km	MPC · JPL
253189	2002 XZ_{29}	—	December 5, 2002	Socorro	LINEAR	·	3.1 km	MPC · JPL
253190	2002 XL_{36}	—	December 6, 2002	Socorro	LINEAR	JUN	1.6 km	MPC · JPL
253191	2002 XM_{42}	—	December 6, 2002	Socorro	LINEAR	·	2.2 km	MPC · JPL
253192	2002 XQ_{45}	—	December 10, 2002	Socorro	LINEAR	H	840 m	MPC · JPL
253193	2002 XU_{45}	—	December 10, 2002	Socorro	LINEAR	H	950 m	MPC · JPL
253194	2002 XP_{51}	—	December 10, 2002	Socorro	LINEAR	NYS	2.0 km	MPC · JPL
253195	2002 XB_{55}	—	December 10, 2002	Palomar	NEAT	V	1 km	MPC · JPL
253196	2002 XW_{55}	—	December 10, 2002	Palomar	NEAT	GAL	3.0 km	MPC · JPL
253197	2002 XN_{57}	—	December 10, 2002	Palomar	NEAT	(5)	1.7 km	MPC · JPL
253198	2002 XO_{60}	—	December 10, 2002	Socorro	LINEAR	slow	3.1 km	MPC · JPL
253199	2002 XA_{65}	—	December 12, 2002	Socorro	LINEAR	H	890 m	MPC · JPL
253200	2002 XW_{69}	—	December 5, 2002	Socorro	LINEAR	·	1.7 km	MPC · JPL

== 253201–253300 ==
back to top

Designation			Discovery			Properties		Ref
Permanent	Provisional	Named after	Date	Site	Discoverer(s)	Category	Diam.	Ref
253201	2002 XP_{70}	—	December 10, 2002	Socorro	LINEAR	·	1.9 km	MPC · JPL
253202	2002 XY_{73}	—	December 11, 2002	Socorro	LINEAR	·	1.5 km	MPC · JPL
253203	2002 XO_{74}	—	December 11, 2002	Socorro	LINEAR	·	1.9 km	MPC · JPL
253204	2002 XL_{75}	—	December 11, 2002	Socorro	LINEAR	(5)	1.7 km	MPC · JPL
253205	2002 XT_{77}	—	December 11, 2002	Socorro	LINEAR	·	2.1 km	MPC · JPL
253206	2002 XL_{80}	—	December 11, 2002	Socorro	LINEAR	EUN	1.9 km	MPC · JPL
253207	2002 XU_{80}	—	December 11, 2002	Socorro	LINEAR	·	2.7 km	MPC · JPL
253208	2002 XP_{82}	—	December 12, 2002	Palomar	NEAT	·	2.0 km	MPC · JPL
253209	2002 XX_{85}	—	December 11, 2002	Socorro	LINEAR	·	1.8 km	MPC · JPL
253210	2002 XQ_{89}	—	December 10, 2002	Bergisch Gladbach	W. Bickel	·	1.5 km	MPC · JPL
253211	2002 XV_{92}	—	December 5, 2002	Socorro	LINEAR	(5)	1.2 km	MPC · JPL
253212	2002 XC_{99}	—	December 5, 2002	Socorro	LINEAR	·	1.7 km	MPC · JPL
253213	2002 XU_{103}	—	December 5, 2002	Socorro	LINEAR	·	3.5 km	MPC · JPL
253214	2002 XM_{107}	—	December 5, 2002	Socorro	LINEAR	·	1.5 km	MPC · JPL
253215	2002 XO_{112}	—	December 6, 2002	Socorro	LINEAR	(5)	1.7 km	MPC · JPL
253216	2002 XW_{113}	—	December 10, 2002	Socorro	LINEAR	·	2.3 km	MPC · JPL
253217	2002 XB_{116}	—	December 5, 2002	Palomar	NEAT	(5)	1.3 km	MPC · JPL
253218	2002 XD_{116}	—	December 5, 2002	Socorro	LINEAR	·	2.6 km	MPC · JPL
253219	2002 XC_{117}	—	December 14, 2002	Apache Point	SDSS	·	2.8 km	MPC · JPL
253220	2002 YC_{2}	—	December 27, 2002	Socorro	LINEAR	·	4.5 km	MPC · JPL
253221	2002 YL_{2}	—	December 28, 2002	Pla D'Arguines	D'Arguines, Pla	·	2.3 km	MPC · JPL
253222	2002 YU_{2}	—	December 28, 2002	Socorro	LINEAR	·	2.4 km	MPC · JPL
253223	2002 YV_{5}	—	December 27, 2002	Anderson Mesa	LONEOS	·	2.1 km	MPC · JPL
253224	2002 YA_{6}	—	December 28, 2002	Needville	L. Casady, A. Cruz	(5)	1.8 km	MPC · JPL
253225	2002 YU_{8}	—	December 31, 2002	Socorro	LINEAR	·	1.9 km	MPC · JPL
253226	2002 YV_{9}	—	December 31, 2002	Socorro	LINEAR	·	2.6 km	MPC · JPL
253227	2002 YF_{11}	—	December 31, 2002	Socorro	LINEAR	·	3.0 km	MPC · JPL
253228	2002 YZ_{16}	—	December 31, 2002	Socorro	LINEAR	·	1.9 km	MPC · JPL
253229	2002 YQ_{19}	—	December 31, 2002	Socorro	LINEAR	·	2.2 km	MPC · JPL
253230	2002 YT_{19}	—	December 31, 2002	Socorro	LINEAR	·	1.3 km	MPC · JPL
253231	2002 YE_{21}	—	December 31, 2002	Socorro	LINEAR	·	3.0 km	MPC · JPL
253232	2002 YZ_{21}	—	December 31, 2002	Socorro	LINEAR	·	1.5 km	MPC · JPL
253233	2002 YC_{25}	—	December 31, 2002	Socorro	LINEAR	·	1.5 km	MPC · JPL
253234	2002 YX_{31}	—	December 31, 2002	Socorro	LINEAR	·	1.9 km	MPC · JPL
253235	2002 YB_{36}	—	December 31, 2002	Socorro	LINEAR	·	2.5 km	MPC · JPL
253236	2003 AU_{6}	—	January 2, 2003	Socorro	LINEAR	·	2.0 km	MPC · JPL
253237	2003 AT_{14}	—	January 2, 2003	Anderson Mesa	LONEOS	(1547)	2.7 km	MPC · JPL
253238	2003 AX_{14}	—	January 2, 2003	Socorro	LINEAR	·	2.2 km	MPC · JPL
253239	2003 AY_{14}	—	January 2, 2003	Socorro	LINEAR	·	3.0 km	MPC · JPL
253240	2003 AZ_{17}	—	January 5, 2003	Anderson Mesa	LONEOS	·	2.5 km	MPC · JPL
253241	2003 AB_{18}	—	January 5, 2003	Anderson Mesa	LONEOS	·	2.6 km	MPC · JPL
253242	2003 AX_{21}	—	January 5, 2003	Socorro	LINEAR	WIT	1.3 km	MPC · JPL
253243	2003 AP_{22}	—	January 5, 2003	Socorro	LINEAR	·	1.8 km	MPC · JPL
253244	2003 AJ_{24}	—	January 4, 2003	Socorro	LINEAR	·	1.7 km	MPC · JPL
253245	2003 AU_{27}	—	January 4, 2003	Socorro	LINEAR	·	1.8 km	MPC · JPL
253246	2003 AQ_{30}	—	January 4, 2003	Socorro	LINEAR	·	5.5 km	MPC · JPL
253247	2003 AW_{32}	—	January 5, 2003	Anderson Mesa	LONEOS	·	2.6 km	MPC · JPL
253248	2003 AB_{35}	—	January 7, 2003	Socorro	LINEAR	·	1.8 km	MPC · JPL
253249	2003 AG_{40}	—	January 7, 2003	Socorro	LINEAR	·	1.8 km	MPC · JPL
253250	2003 AJ_{43}	—	January 5, 2003	Socorro	LINEAR	RAF	1.4 km	MPC · JPL
253251	2003 AZ_{46}	—	January 5, 2003	Socorro	LINEAR	·	1.9 km	MPC · JPL
253252	2003 AW_{47}	—	January 5, 2003	Socorro	LINEAR	(5)	1.5 km	MPC · JPL
253253	2003 AN_{53}	—	January 5, 2003	Socorro	LINEAR	·	1.8 km	MPC · JPL
253254	2003 AB_{54}	—	January 5, 2003	Socorro	LINEAR	·	1.7 km	MPC · JPL
253255	2003 AW_{55}	—	January 5, 2003	Socorro	LINEAR	(5)	2.2 km	MPC · JPL
253256	2003 AR_{56}	—	January 5, 2003	Socorro	LINEAR	·	2.0 km	MPC · JPL
253257	2003 AZ_{56}	—	January 5, 2003	Socorro	LINEAR	(5)	1.7 km	MPC · JPL
253258	2003 AF_{58}	—	January 5, 2003	Socorro	LINEAR	·	2.3 km	MPC · JPL
253259	2003 AM_{58}	—	January 5, 2003	Socorro	LINEAR	(5)	2.3 km	MPC · JPL
253260	2003 AT_{58}	—	January 5, 2003	Socorro	LINEAR	(5)	2.2 km	MPC · JPL
253261	2003 AX_{59}	—	January 5, 2003	Socorro	LINEAR	·	2.5 km	MPC · JPL
253262	2003 AA_{60}	—	January 5, 2003	Socorro	LINEAR	·	2.0 km	MPC · JPL
253263	2003 AZ_{60}	—	January 7, 2003	Socorro	LINEAR	(5)	1.4 km	MPC · JPL
253264	2003 AH_{63}	—	January 8, 2003	Socorro	LINEAR	·	2.1 km	MPC · JPL
253265	2003 AV_{65}	—	January 7, 2003	Socorro	LINEAR	·	2.2 km	MPC · JPL
253266	2003 AQ_{66}	—	January 7, 2003	Socorro	LINEAR	·	2.7 km	MPC · JPL
253267	2003 AD_{69}	—	January 9, 2003	Socorro	LINEAR	·	1.8 km	MPC · JPL
253268	2003 AH_{69}	—	January 9, 2003	Socorro	LINEAR	H	810 m	MPC · JPL
253269	2003 AR_{70}	—	January 10, 2003	Socorro	LINEAR	·	2.9 km	MPC · JPL
253270	2003 AD_{72}	—	January 10, 2003	Socorro	LINEAR	·	3.5 km	MPC · JPL
253271	2003 AU_{76}	—	January 10, 2003	Socorro	LINEAR	EUN	1.8 km	MPC · JPL
253272	2003 AC_{78}	—	January 10, 2003	Socorro	LINEAR	·	2.4 km	MPC · JPL
253273	2003 AL_{80}	—	January 10, 2003	Socorro	LINEAR	H	780 m	MPC · JPL
253274	2003 AF_{92}	—	January 7, 2003	Socorro	LINEAR	·	2.2 km	MPC · JPL
253275	2003 AK_{94}	—	January 11, 2003	Socorro	LINEAR	·	2.8 km	MPC · JPL
253276	2003 BO_{3}	—	January 23, 2003	La Silla	A. Boattini, H. Scholl	·	2.6 km	MPC · JPL
253277	2003 BL_{4}	—	January 25, 2003	La Silla	A. Boattini, H. Scholl	BRA	2.5 km	MPC · JPL
253278	2003 BZ_{9}	—	January 26, 2003	Palomar	NEAT	·	1.9 km	MPC · JPL
253279	2003 BR_{10}	—	January 26, 2003	Anderson Mesa	LONEOS	·	4.3 km	MPC · JPL
253280	2003 BE_{11}	—	January 26, 2003	Anderson Mesa	LONEOS	·	2.3 km	MPC · JPL
253281	2003 BF_{11}	—	January 26, 2003	Anderson Mesa	LONEOS	(5)	1.7 km	MPC · JPL
253282	2003 BY_{23}	—	January 25, 2003	Palomar	NEAT	·	3.1 km	MPC · JPL
253283	2003 BW_{26}	—	January 26, 2003	Anderson Mesa	LONEOS	·	2.4 km	MPC · JPL
253284	2003 BT_{27}	—	January 26, 2003	Anderson Mesa	LONEOS	·	2.7 km	MPC · JPL
253285	2003 BS_{28}	—	January 26, 2003	Haleakala	NEAT	·	2.6 km	MPC · JPL
253286	2003 BB_{33}	—	January 27, 2003	Palomar	NEAT	·	2.4 km	MPC · JPL
253287	2003 BZ_{38}	—	January 27, 2003	Socorro	LINEAR	·	2.7 km	MPC · JPL
253288	2003 BA_{39}	—	January 27, 2003	Socorro	LINEAR	AGN	1.4 km	MPC · JPL
253289	2003 BH_{41}	—	January 29, 2003	Kitt Peak	Spacewatch	·	2.0 km	MPC · JPL
253290	2003 BO_{61}	—	January 27, 2003	Haleakala	NEAT	(5)	1.9 km	MPC · JPL
253291	2003 BB_{62}	—	January 28, 2003	Kitt Peak	Spacewatch	·	2.6 km	MPC · JPL
253292	2003 BD_{62}	—	January 28, 2003	Palomar	NEAT	·	2.5 km	MPC · JPL
253293	2003 BG_{62}	—	January 28, 2003	Palomar	NEAT	·	2.3 km	MPC · JPL
253294	2003 BK_{63}	—	January 28, 2003	Socorro	LINEAR	·	3.8 km	MPC · JPL
253295	2003 BK_{68}	—	January 28, 2003	Palomar	NEAT	·	1.7 km	MPC · JPL
253296	2003 BW_{71}	—	January 28, 2003	Socorro	LINEAR	GEF	1.8 km	MPC · JPL
253297	2003 BD_{72}	—	January 28, 2003	Socorro	LINEAR	·	2.0 km	MPC · JPL
253298	2003 BT_{72}	—	January 28, 2003	Palomar	NEAT	(5)	2.4 km	MPC · JPL
253299	2003 BL_{73}	—	January 29, 2003	Palomar	NEAT	·	1.5 km	MPC · JPL
253300	2003 BM_{74}	—	January 29, 2003	Palomar	NEAT	·	2.3 km	MPC · JPL

== 253301–253400 ==
back to top

Designation			Discovery			Properties		Ref
Permanent	Provisional	Named after	Date	Site	Discoverer(s)	Category	Diam.	Ref
253301	2003 BK_{79}	—	January 31, 2003	Anderson Mesa	LONEOS	JUN	2.0 km	MPC · JPL
253302	2003 BL_{85}	—	January 28, 2003	Haleakala	NEAT	·	2.1 km	MPC · JPL
253303	2003 CH_{1}	—	February 1, 2003	Socorro	LINEAR	·	3.3 km	MPC · JPL
253304	2003 CZ_{7}	—	February 1, 2003	Socorro	LINEAR	·	2.8 km	MPC · JPL
253305	2003 CS_{11}	—	February 1, 2003	Socorro	LINEAR	EUN ·	2.9 km	MPC · JPL
253306	2003 CA_{12}	—	February 1, 2003	Haleakala	NEAT	·	2.6 km	MPC · JPL
253307	2003 CZ_{12}	—	February 2, 2003	Palomar	NEAT	·	2.7 km	MPC · JPL
253308	2003 CK_{17}	—	February 8, 2003	Socorro	LINEAR	·	2.2 km	MPC · JPL
253309	2003 CM_{19}	—	February 9, 2003	Kitt Peak	Spacewatch	·	2.8 km	MPC · JPL
253310	2003 CV_{19}	—	February 9, 2003	Palomar	NEAT	·	2.8 km	MPC · JPL
253311	2003 CC_{20}	—	February 11, 2003	La Silla	Michelsen, R., G. Masi	·	2.9 km	MPC · JPL
253312	2003 CA_{25}	—	February 2, 2003	Palomar	NEAT	·	2.6 km	MPC · JPL
253313	2003 DY_{1}	—	February 21, 2003	Palomar	NEAT	GEF	1.7 km	MPC · JPL
253314	2003 DG_{5}	—	February 19, 2003	Palomar	NEAT	(5)	1.5 km	MPC · JPL
253315	2003 DQ_{5}	—	February 19, 2003	Palomar	NEAT	·	3.2 km	MPC · JPL
253316	2003 DE_{11}	—	February 23, 2003	Kitt Peak	Spacewatch	·	4.3 km	MPC · JPL
253317	2003 DG_{19}	—	February 21, 2003	Palomar	NEAT	·	1.9 km	MPC · JPL
253318	2003 DE_{21}	—	February 23, 2003	Anderson Mesa	LONEOS	·	3.4 km	MPC · JPL
253319	2003 DB_{22}	—	February 28, 2003	Socorro	LINEAR	·	2.9 km	MPC · JPL
253320	2003 DE_{22}	—	February 28, 2003	Socorro	LINEAR	·	2.8 km	MPC · JPL
253321	2003 EO_{9}	—	March 6, 2003	Anderson Mesa	LONEOS	·	3.7 km	MPC · JPL
253322	2003 EK_{13}	—	March 6, 2003	Palomar	NEAT	MRX	1.4 km	MPC · JPL
253323	2003 EN_{13}	—	March 6, 2003	Palomar	NEAT	·	1.2 km	MPC · JPL
253324	2003 EP_{21}	—	March 6, 2003	Anderson Mesa	LONEOS	·	1.9 km	MPC · JPL
253325	2003 EJ_{29}	—	March 6, 2003	Socorro	LINEAR	·	2.7 km	MPC · JPL
253326	2003 EL_{33}	—	March 7, 2003	Anderson Mesa	LONEOS	AGN	1.9 km	MPC · JPL
253327	2003 EE_{40}	—	March 8, 2003	Kitt Peak	Spacewatch	·	2.1 km	MPC · JPL
253328	2003 EP_{43}	—	March 10, 2003	Socorro	LINEAR	H	800 m	MPC · JPL
253329	2003 EM_{52}	—	March 11, 2003	Palomar	NEAT	·	2.7 km	MPC · JPL
253330	2003 ER_{63}	—	March 12, 2003	Kitt Peak	Spacewatch	L4	14 km	MPC · JPL
253331	2003 FY_{2}	—	March 23, 2003	Socorro	LINEAR	H	780 m	MPC · JPL
253332	2003 FR_{4}	—	March 26, 2003	Socorro	LINEAR	·	4.6 km	MPC · JPL
253333	2003 FA_{7}	—	March 26, 2003	Wrightwood	J. W. Young	·	2.3 km	MPC · JPL
253334	2003 FL_{9}	—	March 20, 2003	Palomar	NEAT	DOR	2.9 km	MPC · JPL
253335	2003 FV_{17}	—	March 24, 2003	Kitt Peak	Spacewatch	·	3.0 km	MPC · JPL
253336	2003 FD_{20}	—	March 23, 2003	Palomar	NEAT	·	2.2 km	MPC · JPL
253337	2003 FC_{33}	—	March 23, 2003	Kitt Peak	Spacewatch	·	3.6 km	MPC · JPL
253338	2003 FZ_{35}	—	March 23, 2003	Kitt Peak	Spacewatch	TIR	3.3 km	MPC · JPL
253339	2003 FX_{38}	—	March 23, 2003	Kitt Peak	Spacewatch	·	2.4 km	MPC · JPL
253340	2003 FF_{39}	—	March 24, 2003	Kitt Peak	Spacewatch	L4	10 km	MPC · JPL
253341	2003 FF_{44}	—	March 23, 2003	Kitt Peak	Spacewatch	·	3.0 km	MPC · JPL
253342	2003 FW_{45}	—	March 24, 2003	Kitt Peak	Spacewatch	·	3.1 km	MPC · JPL
253343	2003 FC_{48}	—	March 24, 2003	Kitt Peak	Spacewatch	L4	10 km	MPC · JPL
253344	2003 FK_{53}	—	March 25, 2003	Palomar	NEAT	·	3.2 km	MPC · JPL
253345	2003 FZ_{53}	—	March 25, 2003	Haleakala	NEAT	·	2.4 km	MPC · JPL
253346	2003 FY_{61}	—	March 26, 2003	Palomar	NEAT	·	3.4 km	MPC · JPL
253347	2003 FJ_{64}	—	March 26, 2003	Palomar	NEAT	L4	10 km	MPC · JPL
253348	2003 FP_{71}	—	March 26, 2003	Kitt Peak	Spacewatch	L4	10 km	MPC · JPL
253349	2003 FT_{75}	—	March 27, 2003	Palomar	NEAT	·	2.8 km	MPC · JPL
253350	2003 FG_{77}	—	March 27, 2003	Palomar	NEAT	·	3.4 km	MPC · JPL
253351	2003 FO_{78}	—	March 27, 2003	Kitt Peak	Spacewatch	·	2.7 km	MPC · JPL
253352	2003 FX_{78}	—	March 27, 2003	Socorro	LINEAR	·	2.4 km	MPC · JPL
253353	2003 FP_{81}	—	March 27, 2003	Kitt Peak	Spacewatch	GAL	2.5 km	MPC · JPL
253354	2003 FR_{99}	—	March 31, 2003	Kitt Peak	Spacewatch	·	2.9 km	MPC · JPL
253355	2003 FF_{130}	—	March 26, 2003	Kitt Peak	Spacewatch	·	3.6 km	MPC · JPL
253356	2003 FA_{133}	—	March 24, 2003	Kitt Peak	Spacewatch	L4	10 km	MPC · JPL
253357	2003 FO_{133}	—	March 27, 2003	Kitt Peak	Spacewatch	L4	9.2 km	MPC · JPL
253358	2003 GL_{2}	—	April 1, 2003	Socorro	LINEAR	·	5.3 km	MPC · JPL
253359	2003 GV_{12}	—	April 1, 2003	Socorro	LINEAR	·	900 m	MPC · JPL
253360	2003 GW_{17}	—	April 4, 2003	Kitt Peak	Spacewatch	·	2.4 km	MPC · JPL
253361	2003 GZ_{20}	—	April 3, 2003	Anderson Mesa	LONEOS	·	3.0 km	MPC · JPL
253362	2003 GL_{24}	—	April 7, 2003	Kitt Peak	Spacewatch	L4	10 km	MPC · JPL
253363	2003 GW_{25}	—	April 4, 2003	Kitt Peak	Spacewatch	AGN	1.5 km	MPC · JPL
253364	2003 GO_{27}	—	April 7, 2003	Kitt Peak	Spacewatch	L4	10 km	MPC · JPL
253365	2003 GZ_{29}	—	April 8, 2003	Kitt Peak	Spacewatch	·	2.3 km	MPC · JPL
253366	2003 GA_{30}	—	April 8, 2003	Reedy Creek	J. Broughton	·	3.6 km	MPC · JPL
253367	2003 GL_{37}	—	April 7, 2003	Socorro	LINEAR	·	2.8 km	MPC · JPL
253368	2003 GV_{42}	—	April 9, 2003	Palomar	NEAT	EUN	1.7 km	MPC · JPL
253369	2003 GN_{53}	—	April 1, 2003	Anderson Mesa	LONEOS	·	3.0 km	MPC · JPL
253370	2003 HW_{2}	—	April 24, 2003	Kitt Peak	Spacewatch	·	2.6 km	MPC · JPL
253371	2003 HK_{12}	—	April 26, 2003	Campo Imperatore	CINEOS	·	4.2 km	MPC · JPL
253372	2003 HM_{12}	—	April 26, 2003	Socorro	LINEAR	·	3.8 km	MPC · JPL
253373	2003 HV_{12}	—	April 24, 2003	Kitt Peak	Spacewatch	·	3.1 km	MPC · JPL
253374	2003 HF_{24}	—	April 26, 2003	Kitt Peak	Spacewatch	·	2.4 km	MPC · JPL
253375	2003 HF_{26}	—	April 25, 2003	Anderson Mesa	LONEOS	EOS	2.8 km	MPC · JPL
253376	2003 HX_{27}	—	April 26, 2003	Kitt Peak	Spacewatch	DOR	3.2 km	MPC · JPL
253377	2003 HC_{43}	—	April 29, 2003	Kitt Peak	Spacewatch	L4	10 km	MPC · JPL
253378	2003 HJ_{55}	—	April 25, 2003	Campo Imperatore	CINEOS	·	2.7 km	MPC · JPL
253379	2003 HP_{55}	—	April 28, 2003	Anderson Mesa	LONEOS	·	5.3 km	MPC · JPL
253380	2003 HY_{58}	—	April 30, 2003	Kitt Peak	Spacewatch	L4	14 km	MPC · JPL
253381	2003 JK_{1}	—	May 1, 2003	Socorro	LINEAR	TIR	4.5 km	MPC · JPL
253382	2003 JG_{8}	—	May 2, 2003	Socorro	LINEAR	L4 · HEK	19 km	MPC · JPL
253383	2003 KA	—	May 20, 2003	Wrightwood	J. W. Young	EOS	2.1 km	MPC · JPL
253384	2003 KQ_{3}	—	May 22, 2003	Reedy Creek	J. Broughton	fast?	1.0 km	MPC · JPL
253385	2003 KM_{4}	—	May 22, 2003	Kitt Peak	Spacewatch	·	3.0 km	MPC · JPL
253386	2003 KA_{13}	—	May 27, 2003	Kitt Peak	Spacewatch	EOS	2.5 km	MPC · JPL
253387	2003 KA_{14}	—	May 25, 2003	Haleakala	NEAT	·	1.2 km	MPC · JPL
253388	2003 KB_{19}	—	May 29, 2003	Kitt Peak	Spacewatch	·	790 m	MPC · JPL
253389	2003 KQ_{25}	—	May 31, 2003	Cerro Tololo	M. W. Buie	·	2.7 km	MPC · JPL
253390	2003 KL_{32}	—	May 27, 2003	Kitt Peak	Spacewatch	fast	4.9 km	MPC · JPL
253391	2003 LM_{1}	—	June 2, 2003	Socorro	LINEAR	·	4.5 km	MPC · JPL
253392	2003 MY	—	June 23, 2003	Socorro	LINEAR	PHO	1.4 km	MPC · JPL
253393	2003 MZ_{5}	—	June 26, 2003	Socorro	LINEAR	·	970 m	MPC · JPL
253394	2003 NZ_{12}	—	July 7, 2003	Kitt Peak	Spacewatch	·	1.1 km	MPC · JPL
253395	2003 NA_{13}	—	July 7, 2003	Kitt Peak	Spacewatch	·	930 m	MPC · JPL
253396	2003 OL_{6}	—	July 22, 2003	Campo Imperatore	CINEOS	·	8.1 km	MPC · JPL
253397	2003 OS_{8}	—	July 26, 2003	Reedy Creek	J. Broughton	·	1.1 km	MPC · JPL
253398	2003 OE_{20}	—	July 30, 2003	Campo Imperatore	CINEOS	HYG	4.4 km	MPC · JPL
253399	2003 OD_{27}	—	July 24, 2003	Palomar	NEAT	·	940 m	MPC · JPL
253400	2003 OA_{28}	—	July 24, 2003	Palomar	NEAT	·	1.1 km	MPC · JPL

== 253401–253500 ==
back to top

Designation			Discovery			Properties		Ref
Permanent	Provisional	Named after	Date	Site	Discoverer(s)	Category	Diam.	Ref
253401	2003 PB_{3}	—	August 2, 2003	Haleakala	NEAT	·	880 m	MPC · JPL
253402	2003 PR_{3}	—	August 2, 2003	Haleakala	NEAT	·	1.1 km	MPC · JPL
253403	2003 PJ_{5}	—	August 4, 2003	Socorro	LINEAR	·	900 m	MPC · JPL
253404	2003 PF_{7}	—	August 1, 2003	Haleakala	NEAT	·	1.7 km	MPC · JPL
253405	2003 QE	—	August 18, 2003	Campo Imperatore	CINEOS	·	850 m	MPC · JPL
253406	2003 QY_{3}	—	August 18, 2003	Haleakala	NEAT	·	1.8 km	MPC · JPL
253407	2003 QV_{9}	—	August 20, 2003	Reedy Creek	J. Broughton	·	1.1 km	MPC · JPL
253408	2003 QM_{14}	—	August 20, 2003	Palomar	NEAT	·	920 m	MPC · JPL
253409	2003 QW_{15}	—	August 20, 2003	Palomar	NEAT	V	780 m	MPC · JPL
253410	2003 QR_{19}	—	August 22, 2003	Palomar	NEAT	·	1.1 km	MPC · JPL
253411	2003 QP_{20}	—	August 22, 2003	Palomar	NEAT	·	1.1 km	MPC · JPL
253412 Ráskaylea	2003 QU_{29}	Ráskaylea	August 23, 2003	Piszkéstető	K. Sárneczky, B. Sipőcz	·	1.4 km	MPC · JPL
253413	2003 QF_{30}	—	August 22, 2003	Reedy Creek	J. Broughton	·	1 km	MPC · JPL
253414	2003 QM_{33}	—	August 22, 2003	Palomar	NEAT	·	890 m	MPC · JPL
253415	2003 QP_{36}	—	August 22, 2003	Palomar	NEAT	·	840 m	MPC · JPL
253416	2003 QR_{36}	—	August 22, 2003	Palomar	NEAT	·	860 m	MPC · JPL
253417	2003 QV_{37}	—	August 22, 2003	Socorro	LINEAR	·	1.1 km	MPC · JPL
253418	2003 QP_{39}	—	August 22, 2003	Socorro	LINEAR	·	960 m	MPC · JPL
253419	2003 QZ_{40}	—	August 22, 2003	Socorro	LINEAR	·	780 m	MPC · JPL
253420	2003 QV_{43}	—	August 22, 2003	Haleakala	NEAT	·	1.7 km	MPC · JPL
253421	2003 QO_{44}	—	August 23, 2003	Palomar	NEAT	·	850 m	MPC · JPL
253422	2003 QT_{45}	—	August 23, 2003	Palomar	NEAT	·	970 m	MPC · JPL
253423	2003 QY_{48}	—	August 22, 2003	Palomar	NEAT	·	910 m	MPC · JPL
253424	2003 QR_{49}	—	August 22, 2003	Socorro	LINEAR	·	960 m	MPC · JPL
253425	2003 QA_{53}	—	August 23, 2003	Socorro	LINEAR	·	800 m	MPC · JPL
253426	2003 QD_{53}	—	August 23, 2003	Socorro	LINEAR	·	1.2 km	MPC · JPL
253427	2003 QM_{56}	—	August 23, 2003	Socorro	LINEAR	V	1.0 km	MPC · JPL
253428	2003 QW_{59}	—	August 23, 2003	Socorro	LINEAR	·	2.4 km	MPC · JPL
253429	2003 QH_{62}	—	August 23, 2003	Socorro	LINEAR	·	1.1 km	MPC · JPL
253430	2003 QL_{63}	—	August 23, 2003	Socorro	LINEAR	·	1.3 km	MPC · JPL
253431	2003 QN_{63}	—	August 23, 2003	Socorro	LINEAR	·	1.8 km	MPC · JPL
253432	2003 QR_{64}	—	August 23, 2003	Socorro	LINEAR	PHO	1.8 km	MPC · JPL
253433	2003 QK_{74}	—	August 24, 2003	Socorro	LINEAR	·	1.1 km	MPC · JPL
253434	2003 QP_{87}	—	August 25, 2003	Socorro	LINEAR	·	970 m	MPC · JPL
253435	2003 QF_{99}	—	August 30, 2003	Haleakala	NEAT	·	950 m	MPC · JPL
253436	2003 QK_{106}	—	August 31, 2003	Socorro	LINEAR	BAP	940 m	MPC · JPL
253437	2003 QV_{106}	—	August 30, 2003	Haleakala	NEAT	·	1.1 km	MPC · JPL
253438	2003 QD_{111}	—	August 31, 2003	Socorro	LINEAR	·	1.3 km	MPC · JPL
253439	2003 QF_{111}	—	August 31, 2003	Socorro	LINEAR	·	1.1 km	MPC · JPL
253440	2003 QS_{111}	—	August 31, 2003	Haleakala	NEAT	·	1.1 km	MPC · JPL
253441	2003 QJ_{115}	—	August 31, 2003	Socorro	LINEAR	V	910 m	MPC · JPL
253442	2003 RZ	—	September 1, 2003	Socorro	LINEAR	·	1.3 km	MPC · JPL
253443	2003 RX_{3}	—	September 1, 2003	Socorro	LINEAR	·	810 m	MPC · JPL
253444	2003 RA_{6}	—	September 4, 2003	Campo Imperatore	CINEOS	·	900 m	MPC · JPL
253445	2003 RQ_{6}	—	September 1, 2003	Socorro	LINEAR	·	860 m	MPC · JPL
253446	2003 RU_{10}	—	September 12, 2003	Anderson Mesa	LONEOS	·	1.6 km	MPC · JPL
253447	2003 RJ_{16}	—	September 14, 2003	Haleakala	NEAT	·	980 m	MPC · JPL
253448	2003 RU_{17}	—	September 15, 2003	Palomar	NEAT	·	1.3 km	MPC · JPL
253449	2003 RX_{18}	—	September 15, 2003	Anderson Mesa	LONEOS	·	940 m	MPC · JPL
253450	2003 RU_{21}	—	September 13, 2003	Haleakala	NEAT	·	950 m	MPC · JPL
253451	2003 RS_{23}	—	September 14, 2003	Palomar	NEAT	PHO	1.7 km	MPC · JPL
253452	2003 RY_{23}	—	September 14, 2003	Haleakala	NEAT	V	1.1 km	MPC · JPL
253453	2003 RD_{26}	—	September 3, 2003	Bergisch Gladbach	W. Bickel	·	910 m	MPC · JPL
253454	2003 RB_{27}	—	September 1, 2003	Socorro	LINEAR	·	1.6 km	MPC · JPL
253455	2003 SK_{3}	—	September 16, 2003	Palomar	NEAT	·	2.4 km	MPC · JPL
253456	2003 SS_{5}	—	September 16, 2003	Palomar	NEAT	·	1.0 km	MPC · JPL
253457	2003 SE_{6}	—	September 16, 2003	Kitt Peak	Spacewatch	·	1.1 km	MPC · JPL
253458	2003 SG_{7}	—	September 16, 2003	Kitt Peak	Spacewatch	·	770 m	MPC · JPL
253459	2003 SQ_{8}	—	September 16, 2003	Kitt Peak	Spacewatch	·	790 m	MPC · JPL
253460	2003 SU_{8}	—	September 17, 2003	Kitt Peak	Spacewatch	·	1.1 km	MPC · JPL
253461	2003 SL_{9}	—	September 17, 2003	Kitt Peak	Spacewatch	·	800 m	MPC · JPL
253462	2003 SR_{13}	—	September 16, 2003	Kitt Peak	Spacewatch	·	940 m	MPC · JPL
253463	2003 SJ_{18}	—	September 16, 2003	Kitt Peak	Spacewatch	·	900 m	MPC · JPL
253464	2003 SA_{19}	—	September 16, 2003	Kitt Peak	Spacewatch	·	1.1 km	MPC · JPL
253465	2003 SC_{25}	—	September 17, 2003	Kitt Peak	Spacewatch	·	1.0 km	MPC · JPL
253466	2003 SS_{25}	—	September 17, 2003	Kitt Peak	Spacewatch	·	840 m	MPC · JPL
253467	2003 SW_{31}	—	September 18, 2003	Kitt Peak	Spacewatch	·	1.2 km	MPC · JPL
253468	2003 SB_{33}	—	September 18, 2003	Palomar	NEAT	·	950 m	MPC · JPL
253469	2003 SV_{33}	—	September 18, 2003	Socorro	LINEAR	V	850 m	MPC · JPL
253470	2003 SD_{39}	—	September 16, 2003	Palomar	NEAT	NYS	1.7 km	MPC · JPL
253471	2003 SS_{43}	—	September 16, 2003	Anderson Mesa	LONEOS	·	880 m	MPC · JPL
253472	2003 SY_{44}	—	September 16, 2003	Anderson Mesa	LONEOS	V	1.1 km	MPC · JPL
253473	2003 SO_{46}	—	September 16, 2003	Anderson Mesa	LONEOS	·	900 m	MPC · JPL
253474	2003 SG_{54}	—	September 16, 2003	Anderson Mesa	LONEOS	·	1.1 km	MPC · JPL
253475	2003 SJ_{55}	—	September 16, 2003	Anderson Mesa	LONEOS	fast	920 m	MPC · JPL
253476	2003 ST_{55}	—	September 16, 2003	Anderson Mesa	LONEOS	·	1 km	MPC · JPL
253477	2003 SC_{63}	—	September 17, 2003	Kitt Peak	Spacewatch	CYB	5.6 km	MPC · JPL
253478	2003 SH_{66}	—	September 18, 2003	Socorro	LINEAR	·	1.4 km	MPC · JPL
253479	2003 SU_{67}	—	September 16, 2003	Kitt Peak	Spacewatch	·	810 m	MPC · JPL
253480	2003 SK_{71}	—	September 18, 2003	Kitt Peak	Spacewatch	·	1.2 km	MPC · JPL
253481	2003 SY_{73}	—	September 18, 2003	Kitt Peak	Spacewatch	·	1.7 km	MPC · JPL
253482	2003 SM_{75}	—	September 18, 2003	Kitt Peak	Spacewatch	(2076)	1.2 km	MPC · JPL
253483	2003 SW_{79}	—	September 19, 2003	Kitt Peak	Spacewatch	(2076)	920 m	MPC · JPL
253484	2003 SR_{81}	—	September 19, 2003	Haleakala	NEAT	V	980 m	MPC · JPL
253485	2003 SB_{83}	—	September 18, 2003	Kitt Peak	Spacewatch	·	600 m	MPC · JPL
253486	2003 SB_{84}	—	September 19, 2003	Palomar	NEAT	·	1.3 km	MPC · JPL
253487	2003 SF_{86}	—	September 16, 2003	Palomar	NEAT	V	850 m	MPC · JPL
253488	2003 SD_{87}	—	September 17, 2003	Socorro	LINEAR	·	1.4 km	MPC · JPL
253489	2003 SC_{91}	—	September 18, 2003	Palomar	NEAT	·	1.1 km	MPC · JPL
253490	2003 SJ_{91}	—	September 18, 2003	Socorro	LINEAR	·	1.5 km	MPC · JPL
253491	2003 SL_{91}	—	September 18, 2003	Palomar	NEAT	·	940 m	MPC · JPL
253492	2003 SM_{94}	—	September 19, 2003	Campo Imperatore	CINEOS	·	1 km	MPC · JPL
253493	2003 SG_{95}	—	September 19, 2003	Palomar	NEAT	·	1.2 km	MPC · JPL
253494	2003 SZ_{103}	—	September 20, 2003	Socorro	LINEAR	NYS	1.3 km	MPC · JPL
253495	2003 SE_{107}	—	September 20, 2003	Palomar	NEAT	·	1.2 km	MPC · JPL
253496	2003 SQ_{107}	—	September 20, 2003	Palomar	NEAT	(2076)	1.3 km	MPC · JPL
253497	2003 ST_{107}	—	September 20, 2003	Palomar	NEAT	V	970 m	MPC · JPL
253498	2003 SS_{109}	—	September 20, 2003	Kitt Peak	Spacewatch	·	1.5 km	MPC · JPL
253499	2003 SD_{112}	—	September 20, 2003	Socorro	LINEAR	MAS	1.1 km	MPC · JPL
253500	2003 SW_{117}	—	September 16, 2003	Kitt Peak	Spacewatch	MAS	1.0 km	MPC · JPL

== 253501–253600 ==
back to top

Designation			Discovery			Properties		Ref
Permanent	Provisional	Named after	Date	Site	Discoverer(s)	Category	Diam.	Ref
253501	2003 SF_{118}	—	September 16, 2003	Palomar	NEAT	·	810 m	MPC · JPL
253502	2003 SY_{122}	—	September 18, 2003	Socorro	LINEAR	·	750 m	MPC · JPL
253503	2003 SX_{125}	—	September 19, 2003	Socorro	LINEAR	·	1.0 km	MPC · JPL
253504	2003 SB_{126}	—	September 19, 2003	Socorro	LINEAR	·	840 m	MPC · JPL
253505	2003 SC_{136}	—	September 19, 2003	Campo Imperatore	CINEOS	V	750 m	MPC · JPL
253506	2003 SQ_{138}	—	September 20, 2003	Palomar	NEAT	·	1.1 km	MPC · JPL
253507	2003 SP_{145}	—	September 20, 2003	Socorro	LINEAR	·	1.4 km	MPC · JPL
253508	2003 SH_{147}	—	September 20, 2003	Palomar	NEAT	·	1.2 km	MPC · JPL
253509	2003 SY_{148}	—	September 16, 2003	Kitt Peak	Spacewatch	·	890 m	MPC · JPL
253510	2003 SY_{149}	—	September 17, 2003	Socorro	LINEAR	·	1.0 km	MPC · JPL
253511	2003 SN_{150}	—	September 17, 2003	Socorro	LINEAR	·	1.2 km	MPC · JPL
253512	2003 SY_{150}	—	September 17, 2003	Socorro	LINEAR	·	1.0 km	MPC · JPL
253513	2003 SE_{152}	—	September 19, 2003	Anderson Mesa	LONEOS	·	1.1 km	MPC · JPL
253514	2003 ST_{152}	—	September 19, 2003	Anderson Mesa	LONEOS	·	960 m	MPC · JPL
253515	2003 SO_{159}	—	September 22, 2003	Kitt Peak	Spacewatch	CYB	4.1 km	MPC · JPL
253516	2003 SH_{160}	—	September 21, 2003	Socorro	LINEAR	·	1.3 km	MPC · JPL
253517	2003 SM_{161}	—	September 18, 2003	Socorro	LINEAR	·	1.2 km	MPC · JPL
253518	2003 SV_{167}	—	September 22, 2003	Haleakala	NEAT	(2076)	1.1 km	MPC · JPL
253519	2003 SF_{168}	—	September 23, 2003	Haleakala	NEAT	·	930 m	MPC · JPL
253520	2003 SD_{172}	—	September 18, 2003	Socorro	LINEAR	·	1.1 km	MPC · JPL
253521	2003 SQ_{178}	—	September 19, 2003	Socorro	LINEAR	·	1.1 km	MPC · JPL
253522	2003 SS_{181}	—	September 20, 2003	Anderson Mesa	LONEOS	·	900 m	MPC · JPL
253523	2003 SH_{183}	—	September 21, 2003	Kitt Peak	Spacewatch	·	970 m	MPC · JPL
253524	2003 SF_{186}	—	September 22, 2003	Anderson Mesa	LONEOS	·	900 m	MPC · JPL
253525	2003 ST_{187}	—	September 22, 2003	Kitt Peak	Spacewatch	·	860 m	MPC · JPL
253526	2003 SP_{188}	—	September 22, 2003	Socorro	LINEAR	·	1.6 km	MPC · JPL
253527	2003 SD_{189}	—	September 22, 2003	Anderson Mesa	LONEOS	V	740 m	MPC · JPL
253528	2003 SP_{190}	—	September 17, 2003	Kitt Peak	Spacewatch	·	1.0 km	MPC · JPL
253529	2003 SN_{191}	—	September 19, 2003	Kitt Peak	Spacewatch	·	970 m	MPC · JPL
253530	2003 SJ_{193}	—	September 20, 2003	Palomar	NEAT	·	940 m	MPC · JPL
253531	2003 SQ_{198}	—	September 21, 2003	Anderson Mesa	LONEOS	·	1.4 km	MPC · JPL
253532	2003 SJ_{202}	—	September 22, 2003	Anderson Mesa	LONEOS	·	800 m	MPC · JPL
253533	2003 SO_{206}	—	September 25, 2003	Haleakala	NEAT	CYB	6.8 km	MPC · JPL
253534	2003 SB_{209}	—	September 24, 2003	Palomar	NEAT	·	1.1 km	MPC · JPL
253535	2003 SA_{210}	—	September 25, 2003	Haleakala	NEAT	·	1.3 km	MPC · JPL
253536 Tymchenko	2003 SB_{215}	Tymchenko	September 22, 2003	Andrushivka	Andrushivka	·	1.1 km	MPC · JPL
253537	2003 SP_{218}	—	September 28, 2003	Desert Eagle	W. K. Y. Yeung	·	1.5 km	MPC · JPL
253538	2003 SX_{220}	—	September 29, 2003	Desert Eagle	W. K. Y. Yeung	·	2.8 km	MPC · JPL
253539	2003 SX_{223}	—	September 30, 2003	Desert Eagle	W. K. Y. Yeung	·	980 m	MPC · JPL
253540	2003 SF_{227}	—	September 27, 2003	Kitt Peak	Spacewatch	·	880 m	MPC · JPL
253541	2003 SK_{229}	—	September 27, 2003	Kitt Peak	Spacewatch	·	940 m	MPC · JPL
253542	2003 SF_{233}	—	September 25, 2003	Palomar	NEAT	(2076)	1.4 km	MPC · JPL
253543	2003 SS_{233}	—	September 25, 2003	Palomar	NEAT	·	1.2 km	MPC · JPL
253544	2003 SQ_{234}	—	September 25, 2003	Haleakala	NEAT	·	960 m	MPC · JPL
253545	2003 SL_{236}	—	September 26, 2003	Socorro	LINEAR	·	1.1 km	MPC · JPL
253546	2003 SZ_{237}	—	September 26, 2003	Socorro	LINEAR	·	930 m	MPC · JPL
253547	2003 SF_{240}	—	September 27, 2003	Socorro	LINEAR	·	1.2 km	MPC · JPL
253548	2003 SZ_{243}	—	September 28, 2003	Socorro	LINEAR	·	950 m	MPC · JPL
253549	2003 SO_{245}	—	September 26, 2003	Socorro	LINEAR	·	870 m	MPC · JPL
253550	2003 SH_{246}	—	September 26, 2003	Socorro	LINEAR	·	1.0 km	MPC · JPL
253551	2003 SH_{249}	—	September 26, 2003	Socorro	LINEAR	·	1.1 km	MPC · JPL
253552	2003 SN_{251}	—	September 26, 2003	Socorro	LINEAR	·	1.3 km	MPC · JPL
253553	2003 SZ_{252}	—	September 27, 2003	Kitt Peak	Spacewatch	·	690 m	MPC · JPL
253554	2003 SJ_{254}	—	September 27, 2003	Socorro	LINEAR	·	1.0 km	MPC · JPL
253555	2003 SB_{256}	—	September 27, 2003	Kitt Peak	Spacewatch	·	1.4 km	MPC · JPL
253556	2003 SH_{258}	—	September 28, 2003	Kitt Peak	Spacewatch	·	1.0 km	MPC · JPL
253557	2003 SK_{258}	—	September 28, 2003	Kitt Peak	Spacewatch	·	850 m	MPC · JPL
253558	2003 SJ_{259}	—	September 28, 2003	Kitt Peak	Spacewatch	·	1.1 km	MPC · JPL
253559	2003 SK_{259}	—	September 28, 2003	Kitt Peak	Spacewatch	(2076)	880 m	MPC · JPL
253560	2003 SF_{261}	—	September 27, 2003	Socorro	LINEAR	·	1.2 km	MPC · JPL
253561	2003 SR_{266}	—	September 29, 2003	Socorro	LINEAR	·	1.6 km	MPC · JPL
253562	2003 SH_{268}	—	September 29, 2003	Kitt Peak	Spacewatch	·	850 m	MPC · JPL
253563	2003 SK_{269}	—	September 21, 2003	Bergisch Gladbach	W. Bickel	·	1.3 km	MPC · JPL
253564	2003 SV_{269}	—	September 24, 2003	Haleakala	NEAT	·	1.3 km	MPC · JPL
253565	2003 SK_{271}	—	September 25, 2003	Haleakala	NEAT	·	1.2 km	MPC · JPL
253566	2003 ST_{272}	—	September 27, 2003	Socorro	LINEAR	·	1.1 km	MPC · JPL
253567	2003 SX_{275}	—	September 29, 2003	Socorro	LINEAR	·	1.6 km	MPC · JPL
253568	2003 SF_{276}	—	September 29, 2003	Kitt Peak	Spacewatch	·	760 m	MPC · JPL
253569	2003 SC_{281}	—	September 18, 2003	Kitt Peak	Spacewatch	V	2.8 km	MPC · JPL
253570	2003 ST_{288}	—	September 28, 2003	Socorro	LINEAR	·	1.1 km	MPC · JPL
253571	2003 SY_{290}	—	September 29, 2003	Socorro	LINEAR	·	1.9 km	MPC · JPL
253572	2003 SP_{304}	—	September 17, 2003	Palomar	NEAT	·	1.5 km	MPC · JPL
253573	2003 SP_{306}	—	September 30, 2003	Socorro	LINEAR	·	1.3 km	MPC · JPL
253574	2003 SZ_{308}	—	September 30, 2003	Anderson Mesa	LONEOS	·	1.8 km	MPC · JPL
253575	2003 SY_{309}	—	September 28, 2003	Socorro	LINEAR	·	1.2 km	MPC · JPL
253576	2003 SH_{311}	—	September 29, 2003	Socorro	LINEAR	·	1.0 km	MPC · JPL
253577	2003 SM_{311}	—	September 29, 2003	Socorro	LINEAR	·	950 m	MPC · JPL
253578	2003 SS_{321}	—	September 22, 2003	Palomar	NEAT	·	2.7 km	MPC · JPL
253579	2003 SW_{326}	—	September 18, 2003	Kitt Peak	Spacewatch	·	730 m	MPC · JPL
253580	2003 SR_{332}	—	September 29, 2003	Kitt Peak	Spacewatch	NYS	600 m	MPC · JPL
253581	2003 SZ_{333}	—	September 22, 2003	Anderson Mesa	LONEOS	·	1.1 km	MPC · JPL
253582	2003 SC_{337}	—	September 28, 2003	Apache Point	SDSS	V	630 m	MPC · JPL
253583	2003 SV_{337}	—	September 18, 2003	Kitt Peak	Spacewatch	·	850 m	MPC · JPL
253584	2003 SY_{342}	—	September 17, 2003	Kitt Peak	Spacewatch	·	840 m	MPC · JPL
253585	2003 SJ_{359}	—	September 21, 2003	Kitt Peak	Spacewatch	·	680 m	MPC · JPL
253586	2003 TX_{7}	—	October 14, 2003	Palomar	NEAT	AMO	490 m	MPC · JPL
253587 Cloutier	2003 TH_{10}	Cloutier	October 14, 2003	New Milford	Milford, New	·	1.3 km	MPC · JPL
253588	2003 TV_{11}	—	October 14, 2003	Anderson Mesa	LONEOS	·	1.2 km	MPC · JPL
253589	2003 TX_{11}	—	October 14, 2003	Anderson Mesa	LONEOS	·	1.5 km	MPC · JPL
253590	2003 TE_{12}	—	October 14, 2003	Anderson Mesa	LONEOS	·	910 m	MPC · JPL
253591	2003 TN_{12}	—	October 14, 2003	Anderson Mesa	LONEOS	·	1.1 km	MPC · JPL
253592	2003 TV_{12}	—	October 15, 2003	Junk Bond	Junk Bond	NYS	1.4 km	MPC · JPL
253593	2003 TG_{13}	—	October 15, 2003	Anderson Mesa	LONEOS	(2076)	1.1 km	MPC · JPL
253594	2003 TE_{15}	—	October 15, 2003	Anderson Mesa	LONEOS	·	2.5 km	MPC · JPL
253595	2003 TJ_{15}	—	October 15, 2003	Anderson Mesa	LONEOS	·	1.9 km	MPC · JPL
253596	2003 TM_{18}	—	October 15, 2003	Anderson Mesa	LONEOS	·	1.3 km	MPC · JPL
253597	2003 UT_{4}	—	October 17, 2003	Socorro	LINEAR	·	1.3 km	MPC · JPL
253598	2003 UZ_{4}	—	October 17, 2003	Socorro	LINEAR	PHO	1.9 km	MPC · JPL
253599	2003 UZ_{8}	—	October 17, 2003	Socorro	LINEAR	PHO	1.5 km	MPC · JPL
253600	2003 UY_{10}	—	October 20, 2003	Palomar	NEAT	·	1.8 km	MPC · JPL

== 253601–253700 ==
back to top

Designation			Discovery			Properties		Ref
Permanent	Provisional	Named after	Date	Site	Discoverer(s)	Category	Diam.	Ref
253601	2003 UU_{13}	—	October 16, 2003	Uccle	T. Pauwels	·	2.0 km	MPC · JPL
253602	2003 UE_{20}	—	October 21, 2003	Anderson Mesa	LONEOS	·	870 m	MPC · JPL
253603	2003 UM_{23}	—	October 22, 2003	Kitt Peak	Spacewatch	·	1.2 km	MPC · JPL
253604	2003 UE_{24}	—	October 23, 2003	Junk Bond	Junk Bond	·	1.6 km	MPC · JPL
253605	2003 UV_{24}	—	October 17, 2003	Anderson Mesa	LONEOS	·	1.1 km	MPC · JPL
253606	2003 UY_{24}	—	October 18, 2003	Kitt Peak	Spacewatch	·	1.2 km	MPC · JPL
253607	2003 UV_{25}	—	October 18, 2003	Anderson Mesa	LONEOS	·	2.2 km	MPC · JPL
253608	2003 UJ_{35}	—	October 16, 2003	Kitt Peak	Spacewatch	·	790 m	MPC · JPL
253609	2003 UU_{39}	—	October 16, 2003	Kitt Peak	Spacewatch	·	860 m	MPC · JPL
253610	2003 UZ_{49}	—	October 16, 2003	Haleakala	NEAT	·	1.4 km	MPC · JPL
253611	2003 UL_{50}	—	October 17, 2003	Kitt Peak	Spacewatch	·	1.3 km	MPC · JPL
253612	2003 UT_{50}	—	October 18, 2003	Kitt Peak	Spacewatch	V	1.0 km	MPC · JPL
253613	2003 UJ_{52}	—	October 18, 2003	Palomar	NEAT	·	2.1 km	MPC · JPL
253614	2003 UM_{55}	—	October 18, 2003	Palomar	NEAT	·	1.0 km	MPC · JPL
253615	2003 UF_{58}	—	October 16, 2003	Kitt Peak	Spacewatch	·	1.1 km	MPC · JPL
253616	2003 UA_{61}	—	October 16, 2003	Palomar	NEAT	·	1.0 km	MPC · JPL
253617	2003 UC_{63}	—	October 16, 2003	Palomar	NEAT	V	920 m	MPC · JPL
253618	2003 UN_{63}	—	October 16, 2003	Palomar	NEAT	V	970 m	MPC · JPL
253619	2003 UZ_{66}	—	October 23, 2003	Kvistaberg	Uppsala-DLR Asteroid Survey	·	1.3 km	MPC · JPL
253620	2003 UR_{77}	—	October 17, 2003	Kitt Peak	Spacewatch	·	1.7 km	MPC · JPL
253621	2003 UJ_{81}	—	October 16, 2003	Anderson Mesa	LONEOS	·	1.6 km	MPC · JPL
253622	2003 UQ_{81}	—	October 16, 2003	Haleakala	NEAT	·	1.1 km	MPC · JPL
253623	2003 UD_{82}	—	October 19, 2003	Kitt Peak	Spacewatch	·	900 m	MPC · JPL
253624	2003 UA_{86}	—	October 18, 2003	Palomar	NEAT	PHO	1.4 km	MPC · JPL
253625	2003 UB_{87}	—	October 18, 2003	Palomar	NEAT	·	1.3 km	MPC · JPL
253626	2003 UV_{90}	—	October 20, 2003	Socorro	LINEAR	V	940 m	MPC · JPL
253627	2003 UT_{93}	—	October 18, 2003	Kitt Peak	Spacewatch	·	730 m	MPC · JPL
253628	2003 UO_{95}	—	October 18, 2003	Kitt Peak	Spacewatch	·	1.3 km	MPC · JPL
253629	2003 UO_{97}	—	October 19, 2003	Kitt Peak	Spacewatch	·	1.0 km	MPC · JPL
253630	2003 UM_{98}	—	October 19, 2003	Anderson Mesa	LONEOS	·	1.8 km	MPC · JPL
253631	2003 UN_{101}	—	October 20, 2003	Kitt Peak	Spacewatch	NYS	1.1 km	MPC · JPL
253632	2003 UK_{102}	—	October 20, 2003	Socorro	LINEAR	·	1.3 km	MPC · JPL
253633	2003 UV_{103}	—	October 20, 2003	Palomar	NEAT	·	1.1 km	MPC · JPL
253634	2003 UE_{106}	—	October 18, 2003	Kitt Peak	Spacewatch	·	1.1 km	MPC · JPL
253635	2003 UO_{107}	—	October 19, 2003	Kitt Peak	Spacewatch	·	910 m	MPC · JPL
253636	2003 UR_{107}	—	October 19, 2003	Kitt Peak	Spacewatch	·	900 m	MPC · JPL
253637	2003 UN_{108}	—	October 19, 2003	Kitt Peak	Spacewatch	·	1.2 km	MPC · JPL
253638	2003 UB_{109}	—	October 19, 2003	Palomar	NEAT	V	950 m	MPC · JPL
253639	2003 UW_{112}	—	October 20, 2003	Socorro	LINEAR	·	1.2 km	MPC · JPL
253640	2003 UV_{114}	—	October 20, 2003	Kitt Peak	Spacewatch	·	740 m	MPC · JPL
253641	2003 UX_{115}	—	October 20, 2003	Palomar	NEAT	V	1.0 km	MPC · JPL
253642	2003 UM_{116}	—	October 21, 2003	Socorro	LINEAR	·	890 m	MPC · JPL
253643	2003 UN_{119}	—	October 18, 2003	Kitt Peak	Spacewatch	V	720 m	MPC · JPL
253644	2003 UP_{125}	—	October 20, 2003	Socorro	LINEAR	·	1.2 km	MPC · JPL
253645	2003 UE_{127}	—	October 21, 2003	Kitt Peak	Spacewatch	·	1.4 km	MPC · JPL
253646	2003 US_{127}	—	October 21, 2003	Kitt Peak	Spacewatch	V	810 m	MPC · JPL
253647	2003 UD_{129}	—	October 21, 2003	Kitt Peak	Spacewatch	V	700 m	MPC · JPL
253648	2003 UK_{133}	—	October 20, 2003	Socorro	LINEAR	·	1.3 km	MPC · JPL
253649	2003 UM_{139}	—	October 16, 2003	Palomar	NEAT	·	1.7 km	MPC · JPL
253650	2003 UA_{140}	—	October 16, 2003	Anderson Mesa	LONEOS	V	750 m	MPC · JPL
253651	2003 UU_{143}	—	October 18, 2003	Anderson Mesa	LONEOS	·	1.5 km	MPC · JPL
253652	2003 UP_{148}	—	October 19, 2003	Kitt Peak	Spacewatch	·	1 km	MPC · JPL
253653	2003 UX_{149}	—	October 20, 2003	Socorro	LINEAR	NYS	1.3 km	MPC · JPL
253654	2003 UY_{149}	—	October 20, 2003	Kitt Peak	Spacewatch	·	1.9 km	MPC · JPL
253655	2003 UG_{155}	—	October 20, 2003	Socorro	LINEAR	·	1.1 km	MPC · JPL
253656	2003 UK_{159}	—	October 20, 2003	Kitt Peak	Spacewatch	·	960 m	MPC · JPL
253657	2003 UG_{161}	—	October 21, 2003	Kitt Peak	Spacewatch	·	940 m	MPC · JPL
253658	2003 UK_{161}	—	October 21, 2003	Anderson Mesa	LONEOS	·	1.3 km	MPC · JPL
253659	2003 UA_{164}	—	October 21, 2003	Socorro	LINEAR	·	1.2 km	MPC · JPL
253660	2003 UF_{164}	—	October 21, 2003	Socorro	LINEAR	·	1.8 km	MPC · JPL
253661	2003 UV_{165}	—	October 21, 2003	Kitt Peak	Spacewatch	·	1.0 km	MPC · JPL
253662	2003 UC_{170}	—	October 22, 2003	Kitt Peak	Spacewatch	·	1.3 km	MPC · JPL
253663	2003 UC_{176}	—	October 21, 2003	Anderson Mesa	LONEOS	·	900 m	MPC · JPL
253664	2003 UV_{178}	—	October 21, 2003	Socorro	LINEAR	·	1 km	MPC · JPL
253665	2003 UR_{179}	—	October 21, 2003	Socorro	LINEAR	NYS	1.3 km	MPC · JPL
253666	2003 UE_{186}	—	October 22, 2003	Socorro	LINEAR	·	1.2 km	MPC · JPL
253667	2003 UX_{186}	—	October 22, 2003	Socorro	LINEAR	·	730 m	MPC · JPL
253668	2003 UQ_{190}	—	October 23, 2003	Anderson Mesa	LONEOS	·	800 m	MPC · JPL
253669	2003 UH_{194}	—	October 20, 2003	Socorro	LINEAR	·	940 m	MPC · JPL
253670	2003 UL_{195}	—	October 20, 2003	Kitt Peak	Spacewatch	·	880 m	MPC · JPL
253671	2003 UB_{201}	—	October 21, 2003	Socorro	LINEAR	·	1.5 km	MPC · JPL
253672	2003 UW_{202}	—	October 21, 2003	Palomar	NEAT	·	870 m	MPC · JPL
253673	2003 UA_{211}	—	October 23, 2003	Kitt Peak	Spacewatch	NYS	1.4 km	MPC · JPL
253674	2003 UZ_{211}	—	October 23, 2003	Kitt Peak	Spacewatch	·	1.2 km	MPC · JPL
253675	2003 UH_{216}	—	October 21, 2003	Socorro	LINEAR	·	1.2 km	MPC · JPL
253676	2003 UR_{219}	—	October 21, 2003	Kitt Peak	Spacewatch	·	910 m	MPC · JPL
253677	2003 UH_{222}	—	October 22, 2003	Socorro	LINEAR	·	2.1 km	MPC · JPL
253678	2003 UU_{222}	—	October 22, 2003	Socorro	LINEAR	·	1.6 km	MPC · JPL
253679	2003 UY_{223}	—	October 22, 2003	Socorro	LINEAR	·	1.7 km	MPC · JPL
253680	2003 US_{225}	—	October 22, 2003	Kitt Peak	Spacewatch	V	680 m	MPC · JPL
253681	2003 UO_{226}	—	October 22, 2003	Kitt Peak	Spacewatch	·	1.5 km	MPC · JPL
253682	2003 UW_{226}	—	October 23, 2003	Kitt Peak	Spacewatch	·	1.1 km	MPC · JPL
253683	2003 UW_{228}	—	October 23, 2003	Anderson Mesa	LONEOS	·	830 m	MPC · JPL
253684	2003 UP_{229}	—	October 23, 2003	Anderson Mesa	LONEOS	V	2.5 km	MPC · JPL
253685	2003 UM_{232}	—	October 24, 2003	Socorro	LINEAR	NYS	1.2 km	MPC · JPL
253686	2003 UD_{234}	—	October 24, 2003	Socorro	LINEAR	·	1.2 km	MPC · JPL
253687	2003 UY_{236}	—	October 23, 2003	Kitt Peak	Spacewatch	·	1.0 km	MPC · JPL
253688	2003 UO_{238}	—	October 24, 2003	Socorro	LINEAR	V · slow	970 m	MPC · JPL
253689	2003 UR_{251}	—	October 25, 2003	Kvistaberg	Uppsala-DLR Asteroid Survey	·	1.7 km	MPC · JPL
253690	2003 UM_{252}	—	October 26, 2003	Kitt Peak	Spacewatch	NYS	1.3 km	MPC · JPL
253691	2003 UQ_{257}	—	October 25, 2003	Socorro	LINEAR	·	1.0 km	MPC · JPL
253692	2003 UH_{260}	—	October 25, 2003	Socorro	LINEAR	·	2.2 km	MPC · JPL
253693	2003 UY_{260}	—	October 26, 2003	Kitt Peak	Spacewatch	SYL · CYB	5.4 km	MPC · JPL
253694	2003 UD_{264}	—	October 27, 2003	Socorro	LINEAR	V	810 m	MPC · JPL
253695	2003 UF_{264}	—	October 27, 2003	Socorro	LINEAR	·	1.6 km	MPC · JPL
253696	2003 UE_{267}	—	October 28, 2003	Socorro	LINEAR	V	780 m	MPC · JPL
253697	2003 UN_{271}	—	October 28, 2003	Socorro	LINEAR	·	1 km	MPC · JPL
253698	2003 UP_{271}	—	October 28, 2003	Socorro	LINEAR	slow	1.1 km	MPC · JPL
253699	2003 UE_{275}	—	October 29, 2003	Socorro	LINEAR	·	890 m	MPC · JPL
253700	2003 UL_{277}	—	October 25, 2003	Socorro	LINEAR	·	1.1 km	MPC · JPL

== 253701–253800 ==
back to top

Designation			Discovery			Properties		Ref
Permanent	Provisional	Named after	Date	Site	Discoverer(s)	Category	Diam.	Ref
253701	2003 UR_{279}	—	October 27, 2003	Kitt Peak	Spacewatch	·	1.3 km	MPC · JPL
253702	2003 UE_{280}	—	October 27, 2003	Socorro	LINEAR	·	1.5 km	MPC · JPL
253703	2003 UB_{281}	—	October 28, 2003	Socorro	LINEAR	NYS	1.6 km	MPC · JPL
253704	2003 UU_{309}	—	October 20, 2003	Socorro	LINEAR	NYS	1.6 km	MPC · JPL
253705	2003 UK_{314}	—	October 19, 2003	Kitt Peak	Spacewatch	·	720 m	MPC · JPL
253706	2003 UQ_{314}	—	October 27, 2003	Kitt Peak	Spacewatch	·	1.2 km	MPC · JPL
253707	2003 UQ_{315}	—	October 19, 2003	Kitt Peak	Spacewatch	·	1.1 km	MPC · JPL
253708	2003 UL_{316}	—	October 24, 2003	Socorro	LINEAR	MAS	920 m	MPC · JPL
253709	2003 UU_{316}	—	October 29, 2003	Socorro	LINEAR	·	1.5 km	MPC · JPL
253710	2003 UD_{360}	—	October 19, 2003	Kitt Peak	Spacewatch	·	930 m	MPC · JPL
253711	2003 UR_{377}	—	October 22, 2003	Apache Point	SDSS	·	890 m	MPC · JPL
253712	2003 VB_{2}	—	November 3, 2003	Socorro	LINEAR	·	1.8 km	MPC · JPL
253713	2003 VS_{3}	—	November 15, 2003	Kitt Peak	Spacewatch	·	1.2 km	MPC · JPL
253714	2003 VW_{3}	—	November 14, 2003	Palomar	NEAT	V	960 m	MPC · JPL
253715	2003 VM_{5}	—	November 15, 2003	Kitt Peak	Spacewatch	·	1.3 km	MPC · JPL
253716	2003 VL_{10}	—	November 3, 2003	Socorro	LINEAR	PHO	1.8 km	MPC · JPL
253717	2003 VN_{10}	—	November 15, 2003	Kitt Peak	Spacewatch	·	1.1 km	MPC · JPL
253718	2003 WT_{1}	—	November 16, 2003	Catalina	CSS	·	1.5 km	MPC · JPL
253719	2003 WP_{3}	—	November 16, 2003	Catalina	CSS	·	1.4 km	MPC · JPL
253720	2003 WQ_{5}	—	November 18, 2003	Palomar	NEAT	·	1.2 km	MPC · JPL
253721	2003 WU_{5}	—	November 18, 2003	Palomar	NEAT	·	1.1 km	MPC · JPL
253722	2003 WA_{6}	—	November 18, 2003	Palomar	NEAT	·	1.8 km	MPC · JPL
253723	2003 WG_{6}	—	November 16, 2003	Kitt Peak	Spacewatch	·	910 m	MPC · JPL
253724	2003 WC_{8}	—	November 16, 2003	Catalina	CSS	·	980 m	MPC · JPL
253725	2003 WC_{9}	—	November 16, 2003	Kitt Peak	Spacewatch	V	850 m	MPC · JPL
253726	2003 WB_{10}	—	November 18, 2003	Kitt Peak	Spacewatch	V	940 m	MPC · JPL
253727	2003 WZ_{10}	—	November 18, 2003	Palomar	NEAT	·	1.2 km	MPC · JPL
253728	2003 WM_{15}	—	November 16, 2003	Kitt Peak	Spacewatch	·	1.7 km	MPC · JPL
253729	2003 WN_{15}	—	November 16, 2003	Kitt Peak	Spacewatch	·	920 m	MPC · JPL
253730	2003 WT_{17}	—	November 18, 2003	Palomar	NEAT	·	1.9 km	MPC · JPL
253731	2003 WG_{19}	—	November 19, 2003	Socorro	LINEAR	·	1.6 km	MPC · JPL
253732	2003 WW_{21}	—	November 17, 2003	Catalina	CSS	PHO	1.4 km	MPC · JPL
253733	2003 WS_{29}	—	November 18, 2003	Kitt Peak	Spacewatch	·	1.1 km	MPC · JPL
253734	2003 WF_{30}	—	November 18, 2003	Kitt Peak	Spacewatch	·	1.4 km	MPC · JPL
253735	2003 WJ_{30}	—	November 18, 2003	Kitt Peak	Spacewatch	·	1.4 km	MPC · JPL
253736	2003 WT_{32}	—	November 18, 2003	Palomar	NEAT	V	830 m	MPC · JPL
253737	2003 WR_{34}	—	November 19, 2003	Kitt Peak	Spacewatch	·	1.7 km	MPC · JPL
253738	2003 WE_{36}	—	November 19, 2003	Kitt Peak	Spacewatch	(2076)	1.2 km	MPC · JPL
253739	2003 WZ_{36}	—	November 19, 2003	Socorro	LINEAR	V	950 m	MPC · JPL
253740	2003 WC_{42}	—	November 20, 2003	Needville	Needville	·	940 m	MPC · JPL
253741	2003 WW_{49}	—	November 19, 2003	Socorro	LINEAR	·	1.2 km	MPC · JPL
253742	2003 WA_{52}	—	November 19, 2003	Palomar	NEAT	NYS	1.1 km	MPC · JPL
253743	2003 WA_{56}	—	November 20, 2003	Socorro	LINEAR	·	1.3 km	MPC · JPL
253744	2003 WS_{56}	—	November 21, 2003	Socorro	LINEAR	·	1.4 km	MPC · JPL
253745	2003 WH_{61}	—	November 19, 2003	Kitt Peak	Spacewatch	EOS	2.3 km	MPC · JPL
253746	2003 WX_{66}	—	November 19, 2003	Kitt Peak	Spacewatch	·	1.8 km	MPC · JPL
253747	2003 WU_{67}	—	November 19, 2003	Kitt Peak	Spacewatch	NYS	1.4 km	MPC · JPL
253748	2003 WQ_{68}	—	November 19, 2003	Kitt Peak	Spacewatch	·	1.1 km	MPC · JPL
253749	2003 WC_{70}	—	November 20, 2003	Kitt Peak	Spacewatch	·	1.0 km	MPC · JPL
253750	2003 WX_{73}	—	November 20, 2003	Socorro	LINEAR	·	1.3 km	MPC · JPL
253751	2003 WY_{75}	—	November 19, 2003	Socorro	LINEAR	V	940 m	MPC · JPL
253752	2003 WM_{89}	—	November 16, 2003	Catalina	CSS	·	980 m	MPC · JPL
253753	2003 WB_{92}	—	November 18, 2003	Palomar	NEAT	·	1.5 km	MPC · JPL
253754	2003 WU_{96}	—	November 19, 2003	Anderson Mesa	LONEOS	·	1.2 km	MPC · JPL
253755	2003 WF_{99}	—	November 20, 2003	Socorro	LINEAR	NYS	1.2 km	MPC · JPL
253756	2003 WB_{100}	—	November 20, 2003	Socorro	LINEAR	NYS	1.6 km	MPC · JPL
253757	2003 WA_{102}	—	November 21, 2003	Socorro	LINEAR	·	850 m	MPC · JPL
253758	2003 WD_{103}	—	November 21, 2003	Socorro	LINEAR	·	1.4 km	MPC · JPL
253759	2003 WK_{104}	—	November 21, 2003	Socorro	LINEAR	MAS	930 m	MPC · JPL
253760	2003 WS_{104}	—	November 21, 2003	Socorro	LINEAR	MAS	1.0 km	MPC · JPL
253761	2003 WU_{105}	—	November 21, 2003	Socorro	LINEAR	·	1.8 km	MPC · JPL
253762	2003 WV_{105}	—	November 21, 2003	Socorro	LINEAR	·	1.6 km	MPC · JPL
253763	2003 WO_{108}	—	November 20, 2003	Kitt Peak	Spacewatch	V	810 m	MPC · JPL
253764	2003 WS_{109}	—	November 20, 2003	Socorro	LINEAR	·	1.1 km	MPC · JPL
253765	2003 WH_{111}	—	November 20, 2003	Socorro	LINEAR	·	1.5 km	MPC · JPL
253766	2003 WO_{112}	—	November 20, 2003	Socorro	LINEAR	·	1.6 km	MPC · JPL
253767	2003 WU_{114}	—	November 20, 2003	Socorro	LINEAR	V	750 m	MPC · JPL
253768	2003 WP_{117}	—	November 20, 2003	Socorro	LINEAR	·	2.1 km	MPC · JPL
253769	2003 WL_{121}	—	November 20, 2003	Socorro	LINEAR	PHO	2.1 km	MPC · JPL
253770	2003 WQ_{126}	—	November 20, 2003	Socorro	LINEAR	PHO	2.0 km	MPC · JPL
253771	2003 WG_{131}	—	November 21, 2003	Palomar	NEAT	NYS	980 m	MPC · JPL
253772	2003 WF_{133}	—	November 21, 2003	Socorro	LINEAR	·	1.4 km	MPC · JPL
253773	2003 WL_{137}	—	November 21, 2003	Socorro	LINEAR	·	1.2 km	MPC · JPL
253774	2003 WT_{138}	—	November 21, 2003	Socorro	LINEAR	NYS	1.8 km	MPC · JPL
253775	2003 WC_{139}	—	November 21, 2003	Socorro	LINEAR	(2076)	1.5 km	MPC · JPL
253776	2003 WG_{140}	—	November 21, 2003	Socorro	LINEAR	·	1.1 km	MPC · JPL
253777	2003 WU_{140}	—	November 21, 2003	Socorro	LINEAR	·	1.5 km	MPC · JPL
253778	2003 WK_{142}	—	November 21, 2003	Socorro	LINEAR	·	1.5 km	MPC · JPL
253779	2003 WB_{143}	—	November 23, 2003	Socorro	LINEAR	·	1.4 km	MPC · JPL
253780	2003 WR_{144}	—	November 21, 2003	Socorro	LINEAR	MAS	900 m	MPC · JPL
253781	2003 WW_{148}	—	November 24, 2003	Anderson Mesa	LONEOS	NYS	1.2 km	MPC · JPL
253782	2003 WF_{149}	—	November 24, 2003	Socorro	LINEAR	·	1.2 km	MPC · JPL
253783	2003 WT_{149}	—	November 24, 2003	Anderson Mesa	LONEOS	·	1.0 km	MPC · JPL
253784	2003 WJ_{155}	—	November 26, 2003	Kitt Peak	Spacewatch	V	990 m	MPC · JPL
253785	2003 WQ_{161}	—	November 30, 2003	Kitt Peak	Spacewatch	·	1.2 km	MPC · JPL
253786	2003 WT_{165}	—	November 30, 2003	Kitt Peak	Spacewatch	MAS	890 m	MPC · JPL
253787	2003 WB_{167}	—	November 18, 2003	Kitt Peak	Spacewatch	V	780 m	MPC · JPL
253788	2003 WT_{168}	—	November 19, 2003	Palomar	NEAT	·	1.3 km	MPC · JPL
253789	2003 WQ_{171}	—	November 23, 2003	Anderson Mesa	LONEOS	·	1.5 km	MPC · JPL
253790	2003 WG_{173}	—	November 18, 2003	Palomar	NEAT	·	1.6 km	MPC · JPL
253791	2003 WV_{181}	—	November 21, 2003	Kitt Peak	M. W. Buie	MAS	1.1 km	MPC · JPL
253792	2003 WX_{184}	—	November 21, 2003	Socorro	LINEAR	NYS	1.5 km	MPC · JPL
253793	2003 WH_{192}	—	November 20, 2003	Socorro	LINEAR	·	1.1 km	MPC · JPL
253794	2003 WQ_{194}	—	November 19, 2003	Kitt Peak	Spacewatch	NYS	990 m	MPC · JPL
253795	2003 XN_{2}	—	December 1, 2003	Socorro	LINEAR	·	1.2 km	MPC · JPL
253796	2003 XP_{6}	—	December 3, 2003	Socorro	LINEAR	·	1.2 km	MPC · JPL
253797	2003 XQ_{6}	—	December 3, 2003	Socorro	LINEAR	·	1.4 km	MPC · JPL
253798	2003 XP_{17}	—	December 15, 2003	Kitt Peak	Spacewatch	·	2.6 km	MPC · JPL
253799	2003 XL_{21}	—	December 14, 2003	Kitt Peak	Spacewatch	·	2.1 km	MPC · JPL
253800	2003 XO_{21}	—	December 14, 2003	Kitt Peak	Spacewatch	·	2.1 km	MPC · JPL

== 253801–253900 ==
back to top

Designation			Discovery			Properties		Ref
Permanent	Provisional	Named after	Date	Site	Discoverer(s)	Category	Diam.	Ref
253801	2003 XP_{23}	—	December 1, 2003	Kitt Peak	Spacewatch	·	1.6 km	MPC · JPL
253802	2003 XQ_{23}	—	December 1, 2003	Kitt Peak	Spacewatch	·	1.1 km	MPC · JPL
253803	2003 XZ_{25}	—	December 1, 2003	Socorro	LINEAR	·	2.6 km	MPC · JPL
253804	2003 XE_{38}	—	December 4, 2003	Socorro	LINEAR	·	1.5 km	MPC · JPL
253805	2003 XP_{38}	—	December 4, 2003	Socorro	LINEAR	·	1.3 km	MPC · JPL
253806	2003 XO_{43}	—	December 14, 2003	Kitt Peak	Spacewatch	V	970 m	MPC · JPL
253807	2003 YP_{6}	—	December 17, 2003	Anderson Mesa	LONEOS	·	1.5 km	MPC · JPL
253808	2003 YS_{6}	—	December 17, 2003	Anderson Mesa	LONEOS	ERI	2.2 km	MPC · JPL
253809	2003 YW_{22}	—	December 16, 2003	Catalina	CSS	·	1.4 km	MPC · JPL
253810	2003 YG_{23}	—	December 17, 2003	Anderson Mesa	LONEOS	NYS	1.7 km	MPC · JPL
253811	2003 YG_{26}	—	December 18, 2003	Socorro	LINEAR	·	2.0 km	MPC · JPL
253812	2003 YJ_{29}	—	December 17, 2003	Kitt Peak	Spacewatch	·	1.3 km	MPC · JPL
253813	2003 YZ_{30}	—	December 18, 2003	Socorro	LINEAR	·	1.2 km	MPC · JPL
253814	2003 YK_{33}	—	December 16, 2003	Anderson Mesa	LONEOS	·	2.2 km	MPC · JPL
253815	2003 YQ_{36}	—	December 17, 2003	Anderson Mesa	LONEOS	·	1.7 km	MPC · JPL
253816	2003 YO_{45}	—	December 17, 2003	Anderson Mesa	LONEOS	V	830 m	MPC · JPL
253817	2003 YF_{48}	—	December 18, 2003	Socorro	LINEAR	·	2.2 km	MPC · JPL
253818	2003 YQ_{48}	—	December 18, 2003	Socorro	LINEAR	·	1.2 km	MPC · JPL
253819	2003 YH_{53}	—	December 19, 2003	Socorro	LINEAR	3:2	6.6 km	MPC · JPL
253820	2003 YU_{53}	—	December 19, 2003	Socorro	LINEAR	·	1.6 km	MPC · JPL
253821	2003 YG_{55}	—	December 19, 2003	Socorro	LINEAR	NYS	1.7 km	MPC · JPL
253822	2003 YT_{57}	—	December 19, 2003	Socorro	LINEAR	·	3.2 km	MPC · JPL
253823	2003 YV_{60}	—	December 19, 2003	Socorro	LINEAR	·	1.6 km	MPC · JPL
253824	2003 YO_{62}	—	December 19, 2003	Socorro	LINEAR	NYS	1.3 km	MPC · JPL
253825	2003 YT_{68}	—	December 19, 2003	Socorro	LINEAR	·	1.8 km	MPC · JPL
253826	2003 YW_{72}	—	December 18, 2003	Socorro	LINEAR	·	1.5 km	MPC · JPL
253827	2003 YQ_{74}	—	December 18, 2003	Socorro	LINEAR	·	1.2 km	MPC · JPL
253828	2003 YR_{76}	—	December 18, 2003	Socorro	LINEAR	·	1.4 km	MPC · JPL
253829	2003 YG_{80}	—	December 18, 2003	Socorro	LINEAR	·	1.7 km	MPC · JPL
253830	2003 YQ_{80}	—	December 18, 2003	Socorro	LINEAR	NYS	1.2 km	MPC · JPL
253831	2003 YV_{81}	—	December 18, 2003	Socorro	LINEAR	V	990 m	MPC · JPL
253832	2003 YZ_{81}	—	December 18, 2003	Socorro	LINEAR	NYS	1.4 km	MPC · JPL
253833	2003 YS_{83}	—	December 19, 2003	Needville	Dillon, W. G.	·	1.6 km	MPC · JPL
253834	2003 YF_{85}	—	December 19, 2003	Socorro	LINEAR	V	850 m	MPC · JPL
253835	2003 YH_{90}	—	December 19, 2003	Kitt Peak	Spacewatch	·	1.7 km	MPC · JPL
253836	2003 YU_{94}	—	December 19, 2003	Socorro	LINEAR	PHO	2.0 km	MPC · JPL
253837	2003 YR_{102}	—	December 19, 2003	Socorro	LINEAR	RAF	1.6 km	MPC · JPL
253838	2003 YR_{112}	—	December 23, 2003	Socorro	LINEAR	·	1.7 km	MPC · JPL
253839	2003 YL_{116}	—	December 27, 2003	Socorro	LINEAR	NYS	1.8 km	MPC · JPL
253840	2003 YC_{117}	—	December 27, 2003	Socorro	LINEAR	·	1.4 km	MPC · JPL
253841	2003 YG_{118}	—	December 28, 2003	Socorro	LINEAR	APO +1km · PHA	1.3 km	MPC · JPL
253842	2003 YZ_{119}	—	December 27, 2003	Socorro	LINEAR	·	910 m	MPC · JPL
253843	2003 YK_{128}	—	December 27, 2003	Socorro	LINEAR	·	1.3 km	MPC · JPL
253844	2003 YS_{130}	—	December 28, 2003	Socorro	LINEAR	·	1.8 km	MPC · JPL
253845	2003 YF_{131}	—	December 28, 2003	Socorro	LINEAR	·	1.4 km	MPC · JPL
253846	2003 YG_{131}	—	December 28, 2003	Socorro	LINEAR	·	1.8 km	MPC · JPL
253847	2003 YH_{132}	—	December 28, 2003	Socorro	LINEAR	·	1.6 km	MPC · JPL
253848	2003 YN_{138}	—	December 27, 2003	Socorro	LINEAR	MAS	1 km	MPC · JPL
253849	2003 YS_{138}	—	December 27, 2003	Socorro	LINEAR	·	1.8 km	MPC · JPL
253850	2003 YJ_{152}	—	December 29, 2003	Socorro	LINEAR	PHO	1.6 km	MPC · JPL
253851	2003 YM_{152}	—	December 29, 2003	Socorro	LINEAR	·	2.3 km	MPC · JPL
253852	2003 YR_{156}	—	December 16, 2003	Kitt Peak	Spacewatch	·	1.5 km	MPC · JPL
253853	2003 YV_{159}	—	December 17, 2003	Socorro	LINEAR	V	1.1 km	MPC · JPL
253854	2003 YF_{169}	—	December 18, 2003	Socorro	LINEAR	V	1.0 km	MPC · JPL
253855	2003 YM_{169}	—	December 18, 2003	Socorro	LINEAR	·	1.6 km	MPC · JPL
253856	2003 YU_{169}	—	December 18, 2003	Socorro	LINEAR	EUN	2.4 km	MPC · JPL
253857	2003 YH_{181}	—	December 23, 2003	Socorro	LINEAR	V	1.2 km	MPC · JPL
253858	2003 YS_{181}	—	December 29, 2003	Kitt Peak	Spacewatch	NYS	1.5 km	MPC · JPL
253859	2004 AL	—	January 11, 2004	Wrightwood	J. W. Young	·	1.1 km	MPC · JPL
253860	2004 AQ_{3}	—	January 13, 2004	Anderson Mesa	LONEOS	·	1.7 km	MPC · JPL
253861	2004 AW_{4}	—	January 12, 2004	Palomar	NEAT	NYS	1.6 km	MPC · JPL
253862	2004 AP_{7}	—	January 13, 2004	Anderson Mesa	LONEOS	·	1.8 km	MPC · JPL
253863	2004 AC_{11}	—	January 13, 2004	Anderson Mesa	LONEOS	·	2.1 km	MPC · JPL
253864	2004 AB_{18}	—	January 15, 2004	Kitt Peak	Spacewatch	NYS	1.0 km	MPC · JPL
253865	2004 AV_{21}	—	January 15, 2004	Kitt Peak	Spacewatch	·	1.2 km	MPC · JPL
253866	2004 AT_{25}	—	January 12, 2004	Palomar	NEAT	·	2.9 km	MPC · JPL
253867	2004 BB_{3}	—	January 16, 2004	Palomar	NEAT	·	1.3 km	MPC · JPL
253868	2004 BN_{3}	—	January 16, 2004	Palomar	NEAT	MAS	1.2 km	MPC · JPL
253869	2004 BS_{3}	—	January 16, 2004	Palomar	NEAT	MAS	930 m	MPC · JPL
253870	2004 BF_{4}	—	January 16, 2004	Palomar	NEAT	·	1.3 km	MPC · JPL
253871	2004 BV_{5}	—	January 16, 2004	Kitt Peak	Spacewatch	·	1.7 km	MPC · JPL
253872	2004 BO_{6}	—	January 16, 2004	Palomar	NEAT	·	1.6 km	MPC · JPL
253873	2004 BT_{9}	—	January 16, 2004	Palomar	NEAT	·	1.1 km	MPC · JPL
253874	2004 BK_{10}	—	January 17, 2004	Palomar	NEAT	·	1.7 km	MPC · JPL
253875	2004 BR_{19}	—	January 17, 2004	Palomar	NEAT	·	2.3 km	MPC · JPL
253876	2004 BW_{20}	—	January 16, 2004	Kitt Peak	Spacewatch	·	1.6 km	MPC · JPL
253877	2004 BW_{23}	—	January 19, 2004	Anderson Mesa	LONEOS	·	1.4 km	MPC · JPL
253878	2004 BY_{24}	—	January 19, 2004	Kitt Peak	Spacewatch	·	970 m	MPC · JPL
253879	2004 BO_{31}	—	January 19, 2004	Anderson Mesa	LONEOS	·	1.1 km	MPC · JPL
253880	2004 BH_{34}	—	January 19, 2004	Catalina	CSS	·	1.6 km	MPC · JPL
253881	2004 BX_{34}	—	January 19, 2004	Kitt Peak	Spacewatch	NYS	1.6 km	MPC · JPL
253882	2004 BG_{37}	—	January 19, 2004	Kitt Peak	Spacewatch	MAS	820 m	MPC · JPL
253883	2004 BP_{43}	—	January 22, 2004	Socorro	LINEAR	·	1.6 km	MPC · JPL
253884	2004 BC_{47}	—	January 21, 2004	Socorro	LINEAR	·	1.3 km	MPC · JPL
253885	2004 BC_{50}	—	January 21, 2004	Socorro	LINEAR	·	1.8 km	MPC · JPL
253886	2004 BF_{51}	—	January 21, 2004	Socorro	LINEAR	·	2.3 km	MPC · JPL
253887	2004 BK_{54}	—	January 22, 2004	Socorro	LINEAR	·	1.3 km	MPC · JPL
253888	2004 BM_{54}	—	January 22, 2004	Socorro	LINEAR	NYS	1.7 km	MPC · JPL
253889	2004 BN_{57}	—	January 23, 2004	Socorro	LINEAR	MAR	1.6 km	MPC · JPL
253890	2004 BD_{67}	—	January 24, 2004	Socorro	LINEAR	·	1.1 km	MPC · JPL
253891	2004 BE_{75}	—	January 22, 2004	Socorro	LINEAR	MAS	900 m	MPC · JPL
253892	2004 BF_{78}	—	January 22, 2004	Socorro	LINEAR	·	1.7 km	MPC · JPL
253893	2004 BL_{92}	—	January 27, 2004	Anderson Mesa	LONEOS	EUN	1.9 km	MPC · JPL
253894	2004 BC_{93}	—	January 27, 2004	Anderson Mesa	LONEOS	·	1.7 km	MPC · JPL
253895	2004 BX_{93}	—	January 28, 2004	Kitt Peak	Spacewatch	·	1.9 km	MPC · JPL
253896	2004 BB_{94}	—	January 28, 2004	Haleakala	NEAT	·	1.7 km	MPC · JPL
253897	2004 BJ_{95}	—	January 28, 2004	Socorro	LINEAR	·	3.8 km	MPC · JPL
253898	2004 BY_{102}	—	January 30, 2004	Socorro	LINEAR	·	2.6 km	MPC · JPL
253899	2004 BP_{107}	—	January 28, 2004	Catalina	CSS	ERI	2.1 km	MPC · JPL
253900	2004 BB_{112}	—	January 24, 2004	Socorro	LINEAR	KON	3.6 km	MPC · JPL

== 253901–254000 ==
back to top

Designation			Discovery			Properties		Ref
Permanent	Provisional	Named after	Date	Site	Discoverer(s)	Category	Diam.	Ref
253901	2004 BY_{112}	—	January 27, 2004	Kitt Peak	Spacewatch	·	1.1 km	MPC · JPL
253902	2004 BC_{124}	—	January 17, 2004	Palomar	NEAT	·	2.0 km	MPC · JPL
253903	2004 BN_{124}	—	January 16, 2004	Kitt Peak	Spacewatch	NYS	1.4 km	MPC · JPL
253904	2004 BL_{144}	—	January 19, 2004	Kitt Peak	Spacewatch	NYS	1.1 km	MPC · JPL
253905	2004 BB_{146}	—	January 22, 2004	Socorro	LINEAR	·	3.0 km	MPC · JPL
253906	2004 BE_{150}	—	January 17, 2004	Palomar	NEAT	·	1.2 km	MPC · JPL
253907	2004 BU_{152}	—	January 27, 2004	Kitt Peak	Spacewatch	·	2.0 km	MPC · JPL
253908	2004 BZ_{158}	—	January 29, 2004	Socorro	LINEAR	·	2.3 km	MPC · JPL
253909	2004 CP_{4}	—	February 10, 2004	Palomar	NEAT	ERI	2.1 km	MPC · JPL
253910	2004 CY_{8}	—	February 11, 2004	Kitt Peak	Spacewatch	THM	2.6 km	MPC · JPL
253911	2004 CH_{9}	—	February 11, 2004	Palomar	NEAT	·	2.7 km	MPC · JPL
253912	2004 CP_{13}	—	February 11, 2004	Palomar	NEAT	MAS	1.2 km	MPC · JPL
253913	2004 CE_{17}	—	February 11, 2004	Kitt Peak	Spacewatch	·	1.8 km	MPC · JPL
253914	2004 CZ_{18}	—	February 11, 2004	Kitt Peak	Spacewatch	MAS	890 m	MPC · JPL
253915	2004 CP_{19}	—	February 11, 2004	Kitt Peak	Spacewatch	NYS	1.5 km	MPC · JPL
253916	2004 CB_{25}	—	February 12, 2004	Palomar	NEAT	·	1.8 km	MPC · JPL
253917	2004 CK_{26}	—	February 11, 2004	Kitt Peak	Spacewatch	·	1.1 km	MPC · JPL
253918	2004 CN_{27}	—	February 11, 2004	Palomar	NEAT	·	1.8 km	MPC · JPL
253919	2004 CS_{28}	—	February 12, 2004	Kitt Peak	Spacewatch	·	1.7 km	MPC · JPL
253920	2004 CH_{31}	—	February 12, 2004	Kitt Peak	Spacewatch	MAS	660 m	MPC · JPL
253921	2004 CJ_{52}	—	February 14, 2004	Kitt Peak	Spacewatch	H	560 m	MPC · JPL
253922	2004 CL_{55}	—	February 12, 2004	Kitt Peak	Spacewatch	·	2.4 km	MPC · JPL
253923	2004 CL_{58}	—	February 10, 2004	Palomar	NEAT	·	2.0 km	MPC · JPL
253924	2004 CL_{61}	—	February 11, 2004	Kitt Peak	Spacewatch	·	2.0 km	MPC · JPL
253925	2004 CE_{64}	—	February 13, 2004	Kitt Peak	Spacewatch	·	1.4 km	MPC · JPL
253926	2004 CQ_{72}	—	February 13, 2004	Kitt Peak	Spacewatch	V	1.0 km	MPC · JPL
253927	2004 CK_{75}	—	February 11, 2004	Palomar	NEAT	·	1.4 km	MPC · JPL
253928	2004 CV_{75}	—	February 11, 2004	Kitt Peak	Spacewatch	·	1.7 km	MPC · JPL
253929	2004 CN_{78}	—	February 11, 2004	Palomar	NEAT	·	1.5 km	MPC · JPL
253930	2004 CO_{78}	—	February 11, 2004	Palomar	NEAT	·	1.1 km	MPC · JPL
253931	2004 CQ_{78}	—	February 11, 2004	Palomar	NEAT	·	1.5 km	MPC · JPL
253932	2004 CL_{80}	—	February 11, 2004	Kitt Peak	Spacewatch	·	2.1 km	MPC · JPL
253933	2004 CM_{80}	—	February 11, 2004	Palomar	NEAT	·	1.4 km	MPC · JPL
253934	2004 CH_{82}	—	February 12, 2004	Kitt Peak	Spacewatch	·	1.5 km	MPC · JPL
253935	2004 CX_{91}	—	February 14, 2004	Socorro	LINEAR	V	980 m	MPC · JPL
253936	2004 CP_{93}	—	February 11, 2004	Palomar	NEAT	·	1.8 km	MPC · JPL
253937	2004 CQ_{93}	—	February 11, 2004	Palomar	NEAT	·	2.3 km	MPC · JPL
253938	2004 CE_{101}	—	February 15, 2004	Catalina	CSS	·	2.5 km	MPC · JPL
253939	2004 CS_{102}	—	February 12, 2004	Palomar	NEAT	·	2.1 km	MPC · JPL
253940	2004 CS_{108}	—	February 15, 2004	Catalina	CSS	·	1.3 km	MPC · JPL
253941	2004 CH_{109}	—	February 15, 2004	Catalina	CSS	·	3.7 km	MPC · JPL
253942	2004 CB_{111}	—	February 12, 2004	Kitt Peak	Spacewatch	·	2.1 km	MPC · JPL
253943	2004 CF_{111}	—	February 14, 2004	Kitt Peak	Spacewatch	·	1.4 km	MPC · JPL
253944	2004 CP_{111}	—	February 12, 2004	Kitt Peak	Spacewatch	·	2.0 km	MPC · JPL
253945	2004 CP_{127}	—	February 13, 2004	Kitt Peak	Spacewatch	·	1.9 km	MPC · JPL
253946	2004 DE_{3}	—	February 16, 2004	Kitt Peak	Spacewatch	·	1.4 km	MPC · JPL
253947	2004 DB_{4}	—	February 16, 2004	Socorro	LINEAR	·	1.8 km	MPC · JPL
253948	2004 DR_{7}	—	February 17, 2004	Kitt Peak	Spacewatch	·	1.5 km	MPC · JPL
253949	2004 DC_{15}	—	February 17, 2004	Socorro	LINEAR	·	2.1 km	MPC · JPL
253950	2004 DY_{22}	—	February 18, 2004	Catalina	CSS	·	1.7 km	MPC · JPL
253951	2004 DC_{26}	—	February 16, 2004	Socorro	LINEAR	·	2.2 km	MPC · JPL
253952	2004 DD_{29}	—	February 17, 2004	Kitt Peak	Spacewatch	·	1.8 km	MPC · JPL
253953	2004 DY_{33}	—	February 18, 2004	Catalina	CSS	EUN	1.8 km	MPC · JPL
253954	2004 DP_{35}	—	February 19, 2004	Socorro	LINEAR	·	1.7 km	MPC · JPL
253955	2004 DZ_{35}	—	February 19, 2004	Socorro	LINEAR	·	2.0 km	MPC · JPL
253956	2004 DB_{38}	—	February 19, 2004	Socorro	LINEAR	H	840 m	MPC · JPL
253957	2004 DP_{38}	—	February 20, 2004	Haleakala	NEAT	·	2.2 km	MPC · JPL
253958	2004 DF_{41}	—	February 18, 2004	Haleakala	NEAT	·	2.1 km	MPC · JPL
253959	2004 DR_{42}	—	February 19, 2004	Socorro	LINEAR	·	2.1 km	MPC · JPL
253960	2004 DK_{44}	—	February 25, 2004	Desert Eagle	W. K. Y. Yeung	NYS	1.4 km	MPC · JPL
253961	2004 DN_{45}	—	February 16, 2004	Socorro	LINEAR	H	640 m	MPC · JPL
253962	2004 DO_{47}	—	February 19, 2004	Socorro	LINEAR	·	3.5 km	MPC · JPL
253963	2004 DN_{50}	—	February 23, 2004	Socorro	LINEAR	(5)	1.7 km	MPC · JPL
253964	2004 DS_{50}	—	February 23, 2004	Socorro	LINEAR	·	1.5 km	MPC · JPL
253965	2004 DR_{54}	—	February 22, 2004	Kitt Peak	Spacewatch	·	1.3 km	MPC · JPL
253966	2004 DQ_{59}	—	February 25, 2004	Socorro	LINEAR	3:2	8.1 km	MPC · JPL
253967	2004 DT_{79}	—	February 16, 2004	Kitt Peak	Spacewatch	·	1.2 km	MPC · JPL
253968	2004 DF_{80}	—	February 17, 2004	Catalina	CSS	·	2.0 km	MPC · JPL
253969	2004 EF_{2}	—	March 12, 2004	Palomar	NEAT	H	750 m	MPC · JPL
253970	2004 EX_{4}	—	March 11, 2004	Palomar	NEAT	MAS	1.0 km	MPC · JPL
253971	2004 EM_{10}	—	March 15, 2004	Socorro	LINEAR	(5)	1.5 km	MPC · JPL
253972	2004 EJ_{14}	—	March 11, 2004	Palomar	NEAT	·	2.0 km	MPC · JPL
253973	2004 EN_{15}	—	March 12, 2004	Palomar	NEAT	·	2.3 km	MPC · JPL
253974	2004 EY_{19}	—	March 14, 2004	Kitt Peak	Spacewatch	·	5.6 km	MPC · JPL
253975	2004 EO_{22}	—	March 15, 2004	Campo Imperatore	CINEOS	HNS	1.6 km	MPC · JPL
253976	2004 EU_{23}	—	March 15, 2004	Socorro	LINEAR	H	940 m	MPC · JPL
253977	2004 ES_{25}	—	March 13, 2004	Palomar	NEAT	(5)	1.4 km	MPC · JPL
253978	2004 ED_{28}	—	March 15, 2004	Kitt Peak	Spacewatch	·	2.0 km	MPC · JPL
253979	2004 EA_{32}	—	March 14, 2004	Palomar	NEAT	·	2.8 km	MPC · JPL
253980	2004 EG_{33}	—	March 15, 2004	Kitt Peak	Spacewatch	·	1.8 km	MPC · JPL
253981	2004 ER_{39}	—	March 15, 2004	Kitt Peak	Spacewatch	·	2.0 km	MPC · JPL
253982	2004 EU_{39}	—	March 15, 2004	Catalina	CSS	·	2.8 km	MPC · JPL
253983	2004 EA_{43}	—	March 15, 2004	Catalina	CSS	NYS	1.8 km	MPC · JPL
253984	2004 EN_{43}	—	March 15, 2004	Palomar	NEAT	·	1.6 km	MPC · JPL
253985	2004 EC_{54}	—	March 15, 2004	Campo Imperatore	CINEOS	MAS	810 m	MPC · JPL
253986	2004 EW_{56}	—	March 15, 2004	Palomar	NEAT	PHO	1.1 km	MPC · JPL
253987	2004 EE_{57}	—	March 15, 2004	Palomar	NEAT	·	1.9 km	MPC · JPL
253988	2004 EY_{58}	—	March 15, 2004	Palomar	NEAT	·	4.3 km	MPC · JPL
253989	2004 EL_{59}	—	March 15, 2004	Palomar	NEAT	EUN	1.8 km	MPC · JPL
253990	2004 EQ_{61}	—	March 12, 2004	Palomar	NEAT	·	1.2 km	MPC · JPL
253991	2004 EZ_{61}	—	March 12, 2004	Palomar	NEAT	·	2.4 km	MPC · JPL
253992	2004 EC_{62}	—	March 12, 2004	Palomar	NEAT	NYS	1.2 km	MPC · JPL
253993	2004 EB_{64}	—	March 13, 2004	Palomar	NEAT	·	2.6 km	MPC · JPL
253994	2004 EP_{67}	—	March 15, 2004	Kitt Peak	Spacewatch	RAF	1.0 km	MPC · JPL
253995	2004 EO_{77}	—	March 15, 2004	Socorro	LINEAR	·	3.8 km	MPC · JPL
253996	2004 ES_{78}	—	March 15, 2004	Catalina	CSS	·	1.6 km	MPC · JPL
253997	2004 EV_{78}	—	March 15, 2004	Kitt Peak	Spacewatch	·	1.6 km	MPC · JPL
253998	2004 EU_{93}	—	March 15, 2004	Socorro	LINEAR	·	1.8 km	MPC · JPL
253999	2004 EY_{95}	—	March 4, 2004	Siding Spring	SSS	·	3.2 km	MPC · JPL
254000 Johncryan	2004 EB_{96}	Johncryan	March 15, 2004	Catalina	CSS	·	3.7 km	MPC · JPL

back to top

== See also ==
- Meanings of minor-planet names: 253001–254000
