= Meanings of minor-planet names: 253001–254000 =

As minor planet discoveries are confirmed, they are given a permanent number by the IAU's Minor Planet Center (MPC), and the discoverers can then submit names for them, following the IAU's naming conventions. The list below concerns those minor planets in the specified number-range that have received names, and explains the meanings of those names.

Official naming citations of newly named small Solar System bodies are approved and published in a bulletin by IAU's Working Group for Small Bodies Nomenclature (WGSBN). Before May 2021, citations were published in MPC's Minor Planet Circulars for many decades. Recent citations can also be found on the JPL Small-Body Database (SBDB). Until his death in 2016, German astronomer Lutz D. Schmadel compiled these citations into the Dictionary of Minor Planet Names (DMP) and regularly updated the collection.

Based on Paul Herget's The Names of the Minor Planets, Schmadel also researched the unclear origin of numerous asteroids, most of which had been named prior to World War II. This article incorporates text from this source, which is in the public domain: SBDB New namings may only be added to this list below after official publication as the preannouncement of names is condemned. The WGSBN publishes a comprehensive guideline for the naming rules of non-cometary small Solar System bodies.

== 253001–253100 ==
Named minor planet	Provisional	This minor planet was named for...	Ref · Catalog
There are no named minor planets in this number range

== 253101–253200 ==
back to top

Named minor planet	Provisional	This minor planet was named for...	Ref · Catalog
There are no named minor planets in this number range

== 253201–253300 ==
back to top

Named minor planet	Provisional	This minor planet was named for...	Ref · Catalog
There are no named minor planets in this number range

== 253301–253400 ==
back to top

Named minor planet	Provisional	This minor planet was named for...	Ref · Catalog
There are no named minor planets in this number range

== 253401–253500 ==
back to top

Named minor planet	Provisional	This minor planet was named for...	Ref · Catalog
253412 Ráskaylea	2003 QU_{29}	Lea Ráskay, a 16th-century Hungarian nun and scholar. She was a member of the Dominican monastery on Margaret Island, Budapest.	JPL · 253412

== 253501–253600 ==
back to top

Named minor planet	Provisional	This minor planet was named for...	Ref · Catalog
253536 Tymchenko	2003 SB_{215}	Mykhajlo Todosovych Tymchenko (1943–2013), a sports coach and longtime physical education teacher at the gymnasium of Andrushivka, Ukraine	JPL · 253536
253587 Cloutier	2003 TH_{10}	Bill Cloutier (born 1955), amateur astronomer and community educator, is current Chairman of the McCarthy Observatory Board of Directors and a founder of the facility. A proponent of science literacy and educational excellence, he has observed this minor planet.	JPL · 253587

== 253601–253700 ==
back to top

Named minor planet	Provisional	This minor planet was named for...	Ref · Catalog
There are no named minor planets in this number range

== 253701–253800 ==
back to top

Named minor planet	Provisional	This minor planet was named for...	Ref · Catalog
There are no named minor planets in this number range

== 253801–253900 ==
back to top

Named minor planet	Provisional	This minor planet was named for...	Ref · Catalog
There are no named minor planets in this number range

== 253901–254000 ==
back to top

Named minor planet	Provisional	This minor planet was named for...	Ref · Catalog
254000 Johncryan	2004 EB_{96}	John C. Ryan (born 1942), American philanthropist who served on the Smithsonian Astrophysical Observatory's advisory board.	JPL · 254000

back to top

Preceded by 252,001–253,000	Meanings of minor-planet names List of minor planets: 253,001–254,000	Succeeded by 254,001–255,000
