= List of minor planets: 853001–854000 =

The following is a partial list of minor planets, running from minor-planet number 853001 through 854000, inclusive. The primary data for this and other partial lists is based on JPL's "Small-Body Orbital Elements" and data available from the Minor Planet Center. Critical list information is also provided by the MPC, unless otherwise specified from Lowell Observatory. A detailed description of the table's columns and additional sources are given on the main page including a complete list of every page in this series, and a statistical break-up on the dynamical classification of minor planets.

Also see the summary list of all named bodies in numerical and alphabetical order, and the corresponding naming citations for the number range of this particular list. New namings may only be added to this list after official publication, as the preannouncement of names is condemned by the Working Group for Small Bodies Nomenclature of the International Astronomical Union.

| Near-Earth obj. | MBA (inner) | MBA (outer) | Centaur |
| Mars-crosser | MBA (middle) | Jupiter trojan | Trans-Neptunian obj. |
| Unclassified |

== 853001–853100 ==
| Designation | | | Discovery | | | Properties | | Ref |
| Permanent | Provisional | Named after | Date | Site | Discoverer(s) | Category | Diam. | Ref |
|---|---|---|---|---|---|---|---|---|
| 853001 | 2008 WU_{41} | — | November 17, 2008 | Kitt Peak | Spacewatch | H | 370 m | MPC · JPL |
| 853002 | 2008 WB_{43} | — | November 17, 2008 | Kitt Peak | Spacewatch | · | 1.1 km | MPC · JPL |
| 853003 | 2008 WH_{43} | — | November 17, 2008 | Kitt Peak | Spacewatch | · | 1.2 km | MPC · JPL |
| 853004 | 2008 WD_{45} | — | November 8, 2008 | Kitt Peak | Spacewatch | · | 630 m | MPC · JPL |
| 853005 | 2008 WG_{49} | — | November 18, 2008 | Catalina | CSS | · | 1.1 km | MPC · JPL |
| 853006 | 2008 WF_{53} | — | September 28, 2008 | Mount Lemmon | Mount Lemmon Survey | · | 2.2 km | MPC · JPL |
| 853007 | 2008 WW_{53} | — | November 19, 2008 | Kitt Peak | Spacewatch | NYS | 650 m | MPC · JPL |
| 853008 | 2008 WU_{56} | — | October 27, 2008 | Kitt Peak | Spacewatch | · | 1.8 km | MPC · JPL |
| 853009 | 2008 WU_{58} | — | November 21, 2008 | Wrightwood | J. W. Young | · | 810 m | MPC · JPL |
| 853010 | 2008 WY_{62} | — | September 23, 2008 | Mount Lemmon | Mount Lemmon Survey | · | 1.2 km | MPC · JPL |
| 853011 | 2008 WO_{65} | — | October 31, 2008 | Mount Lemmon | Mount Lemmon Survey | · | 2.1 km | MPC · JPL |
| 853012 | 2008 WB_{68} | — | November 18, 2008 | Kitt Peak | Spacewatch | 3:2 · SHU | 3.4 km | MPC · JPL |
| 853013 | 2008 WH_{71} | — | October 29, 2005 | Kitt Peak | Spacewatch | · | 1.0 km | MPC · JPL |
| 853014 | 2008 WE_{74} | — | November 19, 2008 | Kitt Peak | Spacewatch | · | 930 m | MPC · JPL |
| 853015 | 2008 WT_{75} | — | November 20, 2008 | Kitt Peak | Spacewatch | HYG | 1.9 km | MPC · JPL |
| 853016 | 2008 WF_{76} | — | September 29, 2008 | Mount Lemmon | Mount Lemmon Survey | NYS | 790 m | MPC · JPL |
| 853017 | 2008 WW_{76} | — | November 20, 2008 | Kitt Peak | Spacewatch | KOR | 1.0 km | MPC · JPL |
| 853018 | 2008 WZ_{77} | — | November 7, 2008 | Mount Lemmon | Mount Lemmon Survey | T_{j} (2.98) · 3:2 | 3.7 km | MPC · JPL |
| 853019 | 2008 WA_{82} | — | September 29, 2008 | Mount Lemmon | Mount Lemmon Survey | · | 770 m | MPC · JPL |
| 853020 | 2008 WB_{82} | — | November 20, 2008 | Kitt Peak | Spacewatch | · | 2.0 km | MPC · JPL |
| 853021 | 2008 WD_{86} | — | October 9, 2008 | Kitt Peak | Spacewatch | · | 830 m | MPC · JPL |
| 853022 | 2008 WK_{86} | — | October 6, 2008 | Kitt Peak | Spacewatch | HYG | 1.7 km | MPC · JPL |
| 853023 | 2008 WM_{86} | — | October 28, 2008 | Mount Lemmon | Mount Lemmon Survey | · | 1.3 km | MPC · JPL |
| 853024 | 2008 WX_{86} | — | October 23, 2008 | Kitt Peak | Spacewatch | · | 570 m | MPC · JPL |
| 853025 | 2008 WY_{87} | — | November 21, 2008 | Mount Lemmon | Mount Lemmon Survey | · | 860 m | MPC · JPL |
| 853026 | 2008 WH_{102} | — | October 29, 2008 | Kitt Peak | Spacewatch | · | 1.1 km | MPC · JPL |
| 853027 | 2008 WT_{102} | — | November 30, 2008 | Siding Spring | SSS | · | 1.0 km | MPC · JPL |
| 853028 | 2008 WJ_{105} | — | November 18, 2008 | Kitt Peak | Spacewatch | · | 940 m | MPC · JPL |
| 853029 | 2008 WO_{105} | — | November 21, 2008 | Kitt Peak | Spacewatch | · | 450 m | MPC · JPL |
| 853030 | 2008 WP_{107} | — | October 5, 2004 | Kitt Peak | Spacewatch | · | 810 m | MPC · JPL |
| 853031 | 2008 WM_{108} | — | November 30, 2008 | Catalina | CSS | · | 2.7 km | MPC · JPL |
| 853032 | 2008 WE_{109} | — | October 28, 2008 | Kitt Peak | Spacewatch | · | 570 m | MPC · JPL |
| 853033 | 2008 WY_{110} | — | November 30, 2008 | Kitt Peak | Spacewatch | · | 2.4 km | MPC · JPL |
| 853034 | 2008 WC_{111} | — | November 21, 2008 | Kitt Peak | Spacewatch | · | 850 m | MPC · JPL |
| 853035 | 2008 WP_{113} | — | November 18, 2008 | Kitt Peak | Spacewatch | JUN | 700 m | MPC · JPL |
| 853036 | 2008 WY_{114} | — | November 6, 2008 | Mount Lemmon | Mount Lemmon Survey | · | 1.0 km | MPC · JPL |
| 853037 | 2008 WN_{122} | — | November 19, 2008 | Kitt Peak | Spacewatch | NYS | 710 m | MPC · JPL |
| 853038 | 2008 WE_{131} | — | November 18, 2008 | Kitt Peak | Spacewatch | · | 490 m | MPC · JPL |
| 853039 | 2008 WE_{136} | — | November 19, 2008 | Mount Lemmon | Mount Lemmon Survey | · | 1.3 km | MPC · JPL |
| 853040 | 2008 WM_{140} | — | September 7, 2008 | Mount Lemmon | Mount Lemmon Survey | · | 570 m | MPC · JPL |
| 853041 | 2008 WU_{140} | — | September 27, 2008 | Mount Lemmon | Mount Lemmon Survey | · | 940 m | MPC · JPL |
| 853042 | 2008 WM_{143} | — | November 17, 2008 | Kitt Peak | Spacewatch | · | 1.3 km | MPC · JPL |
| 853043 | 2008 WS_{143} | — | November 19, 2008 | Kitt Peak | Spacewatch | · | 1.1 km | MPC · JPL |
| 853044 | 2008 WQ_{145} | — | November 30, 2008 | Kitt Peak | Spacewatch | · | 1.4 km | MPC · JPL |
| 853045 | 2008 WB_{146} | — | November 21, 2008 | Kitt Peak | Spacewatch | · | 950 m | MPC · JPL |
| 853046 | 2008 WT_{146} | — | November 19, 2008 | Kitt Peak | Spacewatch | · | 940 m | MPC · JPL |
| 853047 | 2008 WY_{146} | — | November 30, 2008 | Mount Lemmon | Mount Lemmon Survey | EUN | 930 m | MPC · JPL |
| 853048 | 2008 WJ_{147} | — | February 9, 2013 | Haleakala | Pan-STARRS 1 | · | 720 m | MPC · JPL |
| 853049 | 2008 WR_{147} | — | November 30, 2008 | Mount Lemmon | Mount Lemmon Survey | · | 630 m | MPC · JPL |
| 853050 | 2008 WK_{148} | — | November 19, 2008 | Kitt Peak | Spacewatch | · | 1.1 km | MPC · JPL |
| 853051 | 2008 WJ_{149} | — | November 30, 2008 | Kitt Peak | Spacewatch | MAS | 490 m | MPC · JPL |
| 853052 | 2008 WX_{149} | — | August 17, 2013 | Haleakala | Pan-STARRS 1 | · | 2.2 km | MPC · JPL |
| 853053 | 2008 WY_{149} | — | November 18, 2008 | Kitt Peak | Spacewatch | · | 2.2 km | MPC · JPL |
| 853054 | 2008 WC_{150} | — | November 19, 2008 | Kitt Peak | Spacewatch | · | 470 m | MPC · JPL |
| 853055 | 2008 WN_{150} | — | November 18, 2008 | Kitt Peak | Spacewatch | · | 1.0 km | MPC · JPL |
| 853056 | 2008 WO_{151} | — | November 18, 2008 | Kitt Peak | Spacewatch | · | 2.2 km | MPC · JPL |
| 853057 | 2008 WH_{152} | — | November 19, 2008 | Kitt Peak | Spacewatch | · | 580 m | MPC · JPL |
| 853058 | 2008 WL_{152} | — | November 30, 2008 | Mount Lemmon | Mount Lemmon Survey | JUN | 710 m | MPC · JPL |
| 853059 | 2008 WF_{153} | — | May 20, 2015 | Cerro Tololo | DECam | · | 1 km | MPC · JPL |
| 853060 | 2008 WJ_{153} | — | November 19, 2008 | Kitt Peak | Spacewatch | · | 460 m | MPC · JPL |
| 853061 | 2008 WO_{153} | — | November 17, 2008 | Kitt Peak | Spacewatch | · | 1.2 km | MPC · JPL |
| 853062 | 2008 WW_{153} | — | November 18, 2008 | Kitt Peak | Spacewatch | THM | 1.7 km | MPC · JPL |
| 853063 | 2008 WX_{153} | — | November 30, 2008 | Kitt Peak | Spacewatch | THM | 1.9 km | MPC · JPL |
| 853064 | 2008 WM_{155} | — | January 10, 2013 | Haleakala | Pan-STARRS 1 | · | 510 m | MPC · JPL |
| 853065 | 2008 WS_{155} | — | November 19, 2008 | Kitt Peak | Spacewatch | EOS | 1.4 km | MPC · JPL |
| 853066 | 2008 WP_{156} | — | November 19, 2008 | Catalina | CSS | T_{j} (2.96) | 3.0 km | MPC · JPL |
| 853067 | 2008 WQ_{156} | — | November 18, 2008 | Kitt Peak | Spacewatch | · | 900 m | MPC · JPL |
| 853068 | 2008 WR_{156} | — | November 20, 2008 | Kitt Peak | Spacewatch | · | 730 m | MPC · JPL |
| 853069 | 2008 WR_{157} | — | November 22, 2008 | Kitt Peak | Spacewatch | · | 840 m | MPC · JPL |
| 853070 | 2008 WM_{158} | — | November 21, 2008 | Goodricke-Pigott | R. A. Tucker | · | 1.1 km | MPC · JPL |
| 853071 | 2008 WC_{159} | — | November 30, 2008 | Kitt Peak | Spacewatch | · | 1.3 km | MPC · JPL |
| 853072 | 2008 WT_{164} | — | November 19, 2008 | Kitt Peak | Spacewatch | HNS | 860 m | MPC · JPL |
| 853073 | 2008 WX_{164} | — | November 19, 2008 | Kitt Peak | Spacewatch | · | 1 km | MPC · JPL |
| 853074 | 2008 WH_{165} | — | November 24, 2008 | Mount Lemmon | Mount Lemmon Survey | EUP | 2.8 km | MPC · JPL |
| 853075 | 2008 WC_{166} | — | November 20, 2008 | Kitt Peak | Spacewatch | ADE | 970 m | MPC · JPL |
| 853076 | 2008 WJ_{166} | — | November 21, 2008 | Kitt Peak | Spacewatch | · | 1.6 km | MPC · JPL |
| 853077 | 2008 WT_{167} | — | November 21, 2008 | Kitt Peak | Spacewatch | · | 1.6 km | MPC · JPL |
| 853078 | 2008 WX_{168} | — | November 24, 2008 | Mount Lemmon | Mount Lemmon Survey | · | 1.8 km | MPC · JPL |
| 853079 | 2008 XL | — | September 29, 2008 | Mount Lemmon | Mount Lemmon Survey | · | 610 m | MPC · JPL |
| 853080 | 2008 XQ | — | November 2, 2008 | Catalina | CSS | · | 1.8 km | MPC · JPL |
| 853081 | 2008 XK_{4} | — | December 2, 2008 | Mount Lemmon | Mount Lemmon Survey | · | 1.4 km | MPC · JPL |
| 853082 | 2008 XJ_{7} | — | September 23, 2008 | Mount Lemmon | Mount Lemmon Survey | · | 530 m | MPC · JPL |
| 853083 | 2008 XY_{8} | — | December 1, 2008 | Mount Lemmon | Mount Lemmon Survey | · | 940 m | MPC · JPL |
| 853084 | 2008 XO_{13} | — | October 29, 2008 | Kitt Peak | Spacewatch | · | 950 m | MPC · JPL |
| 853085 | 2008 XY_{22} | — | October 26, 2008 | Mount Lemmon | Mount Lemmon Survey | T_{j} (2.97) · EUP | 3.2 km | MPC · JPL |
| 853086 | 2008 XK_{27} | — | December 4, 2008 | Mount Lemmon | Mount Lemmon Survey | · | 2.6 km | MPC · JPL |
| 853087 | 2008 XM_{27} | — | November 9, 2008 | Kitt Peak | Spacewatch | · | 2.2 km | MPC · JPL |
| 853088 | 2008 XD_{29} | — | October 27, 2008 | Kitt Peak | Spacewatch | · | 910 m | MPC · JPL |
| 853089 | 2008 XT_{29} | — | December 1, 2008 | Kitt Peak | Spacewatch | H | 350 m | MPC · JPL |
| 853090 | 2008 XQ_{31} | — | December 2, 2005 | Mauna Kea | A. Boattini | NYS | 660 m | MPC · JPL |
| 853091 | 2008 XF_{36} | — | November 19, 2008 | Kitt Peak | Spacewatch | · | 2.1 km | MPC · JPL |
| 853092 | 2008 XV_{37} | — | December 2, 2008 | Kitt Peak | Spacewatch | · | 1.3 km | MPC · JPL |
| 853093 | 2008 XC_{39} | — | December 2, 2008 | Kitt Peak | Spacewatch | · | 2.2 km | MPC · JPL |
| 853094 | 2008 XG_{43} | — | December 2, 2008 | Kitt Peak | Spacewatch | · | 460 m | MPC · JPL |
| 853095 | 2008 XN_{59} | — | July 2, 2011 | Mount Lemmon | Mount Lemmon Survey | · | 520 m | MPC · JPL |
| 853096 | 2008 XW_{59} | — | July 28, 2011 | Haleakala | Pan-STARRS 1 | · | 420 m | MPC · JPL |
| 853097 | 2008 XJ_{60} | — | December 8, 2008 | Mount Lemmon | Mount Lemmon Survey | · | 1.0 km | MPC · JPL |
| 853098 | 2008 XL_{60} | — | September 21, 2012 | Mount Lemmon | Mount Lemmon Survey | · | 1.1 km | MPC · JPL |
| 853099 | 2008 XU_{60} | — | December 4, 2008 | Kitt Peak | Spacewatch | · | 1.2 km | MPC · JPL |
| 853100 | 2008 XR_{62} | — | December 4, 2008 | Kitt Peak | Spacewatch | · | 2.4 km | MPC · JPL |

== 853101–853200 ==
back to top

| Designation | | | Discovery | | | Properties | | Ref |
| Permanent | Provisional | Named after | Date | Site | Discoverer(s) | Category | Diam. | Ref |
|---|---|---|---|---|---|---|---|---|
| 853101 | 2008 XH_{63} | — | November 24, 2008 | Kitt Peak | Spacewatch | · | 670 m | MPC · JPL |
| 853102 | 2008 XQ_{65} | — | September 29, 2017 | Haleakala | Pan-STARRS 1 | · | 1.2 km | MPC · JPL |
| 853103 | 2008 XN_{66} | — | December 4, 2008 | Mount Lemmon | Mount Lemmon Survey | V | 520 m | MPC · JPL |
| 853104 | 2008 XR_{66} | — | December 5, 2008 | Mount Lemmon | Mount Lemmon Survey | · | 1.2 km | MPC · JPL |
| 853105 | 2008 XU_{66} | — | December 1, 2008 | Catalina | CSS | · | 1.3 km | MPC · JPL |
| 853106 | 2008 XB_{67} | — | December 1, 2008 | Kitt Peak | Spacewatch | · | 520 m | MPC · JPL |
| 853107 | 2008 XL_{67} | — | December 1, 2008 | Mount Lemmon | Mount Lemmon Survey | T_{j} (2.96) · 3:2 | 3.6 km | MPC · JPL |
| 853108 | 2008 XV_{69} | — | December 1, 2008 | Kitt Peak | Spacewatch | · | 1.1 km | MPC · JPL |
| 853109 | 2008 XQ_{70} | — | December 1, 2008 | Kitt Peak | Spacewatch | · | 700 m | MPC · JPL |
| 853110 | 2008 YK_{2} | — | December 20, 2008 | Socorro | LINEAR | AMO | 450 m | MPC · JPL |
| 853111 | 2008 YX_{3} | — | December 22, 2008 | Calar Alto | F. Hormuth | · | 510 m | MPC · JPL |
| 853112 | 2008 YD_{7} | — | December 20, 2008 | Mount Lemmon | Mount Lemmon Survey | T_{j} (2.91) | 2.9 km | MPC · JPL |
| 853113 | 2008 YS_{12} | — | November 6, 2008 | Mount Lemmon | Mount Lemmon Survey | · | 510 m | MPC · JPL |
| 853114 | 2008 YZ_{15} | — | December 21, 2008 | Mount Lemmon | Mount Lemmon Survey | · | 720 m | MPC · JPL |
| 853115 | 2008 YG_{18} | — | December 21, 2008 | Kitt Peak | Spacewatch | · | 420 m | MPC · JPL |
| 853116 | 2008 YJ_{36} | — | December 22, 2008 | Kitt Peak | Spacewatch | · | 1.2 km | MPC · JPL |
| 853117 | 2008 YN_{36} | — | October 18, 2003 | Kitt Peak | Spacewatch | · | 1.1 km | MPC · JPL |
| 853118 | 2008 YP_{36} | — | December 22, 2008 | Kitt Peak | Spacewatch | · | 790 m | MPC · JPL |
| 853119 | 2008 YT_{36} | — | December 22, 2008 | Kitt Peak | Spacewatch | · | 690 m | MPC · JPL |
| 853120 | 2008 YU_{36} | — | December 22, 2008 | Kitt Peak | Spacewatch | MAS | 530 m | MPC · JPL |
| 853121 | 2008 YM_{40} | — | December 29, 2008 | Mount Lemmon | Mount Lemmon Survey | · | 1.4 km | MPC · JPL |
| 853122 | 2008 YC_{42} | — | December 2, 2008 | Kitt Peak | Spacewatch | NYS | 760 m | MPC · JPL |
| 853123 | 2008 YE_{44} | — | December 21, 2008 | Kitt Peak | Spacewatch | EOS | 1.5 km | MPC · JPL |
| 853124 | 2008 YK_{44} | — | December 29, 2008 | Mount Lemmon | Mount Lemmon Survey | · | 490 m | MPC · JPL |
| 853125 | 2008 YY_{46} | — | December 29, 2008 | Mount Lemmon | Mount Lemmon Survey | · | 1.2 km | MPC · JPL |
| 853126 | 2008 YQ_{51} | — | December 29, 2008 | Mount Lemmon | Mount Lemmon Survey | · | 790 m | MPC · JPL |
| 853127 | 2008 YO_{57} | — | December 30, 2008 | Kitt Peak | Spacewatch | · | 530 m | MPC · JPL |
| 853128 | 2008 YO_{59} | — | December 30, 2008 | Kitt Peak | Spacewatch | MAS | 580 m | MPC · JPL |
| 853129 | 2008 YR_{59} | — | December 30, 2008 | Kitt Peak | Spacewatch | · | 840 m | MPC · JPL |
| 853130 | 2008 YW_{60} | — | December 30, 2008 | Mount Lemmon | Mount Lemmon Survey | · | 850 m | MPC · JPL |
| 853131 | 2008 YN_{61} | — | December 30, 2008 | Mount Lemmon | Mount Lemmon Survey | · | 1.4 km | MPC · JPL |
| 853132 | 2008 YE_{62} | — | December 30, 2008 | Mount Lemmon | Mount Lemmon Survey | · | 600 m | MPC · JPL |
| 853133 | 2008 YT_{64} | — | December 30, 2008 | Mount Lemmon | Mount Lemmon Survey | · | 830 m | MPC · JPL |
| 853134 | 2008 YR_{69} | — | December 29, 2008 | Mount Lemmon | Mount Lemmon Survey | EUP | 2.8 km | MPC · JPL |
| 853135 | 2008 YY_{69} | — | November 24, 2008 | Mount Lemmon | Mount Lemmon Survey | · | 980 m | MPC · JPL |
| 853136 | 2008 YH_{73} | — | December 30, 2008 | Kitt Peak | Spacewatch | · | 960 m | MPC · JPL |
| 853137 | 2008 YZ_{73} | — | December 30, 2008 | Kitt Peak | Spacewatch | · | 770 m | MPC · JPL |
| 853138 | 2008 YX_{79} | — | November 23, 2008 | Mount Lemmon | Mount Lemmon Survey | · | 550 m | MPC · JPL |
| 853139 | 2008 YN_{86} | — | December 29, 2008 | Kitt Peak | Spacewatch | · | 740 m | MPC · JPL |
| 853140 | 2008 YD_{90} | — | December 29, 2008 | Kitt Peak | Spacewatch | · | 1.3 km | MPC · JPL |
| 853141 | 2008 YM_{92} | — | December 29, 2008 | Kitt Peak | Spacewatch | · | 1.1 km | MPC · JPL |
| 853142 | 2008 YK_{98} | — | December 22, 2008 | Kitt Peak | Spacewatch | · | 470 m | MPC · JPL |
| 853143 | 2008 YF_{100} | — | December 29, 2008 | Kitt Peak | Spacewatch | MAS | 510 m | MPC · JPL |
| 853144 | 2008 YY_{101} | — | October 4, 2004 | Kitt Peak | Spacewatch | · | 610 m | MPC · JPL |
| 853145 | 2008 YN_{102} | — | December 29, 2008 | Kitt Peak | Spacewatch | · | 750 m | MPC · JPL |
| 853146 | 2008 YN_{104} | — | December 21, 2008 | Mount Lemmon | Mount Lemmon Survey | · | 1.3 km | MPC · JPL |
| 853147 | 2008 YQ_{106} | — | December 21, 2008 | Kitt Peak | Spacewatch | H | 350 m | MPC · JPL |
| 853148 | 2008 YC_{108} | — | December 29, 2008 | Kitt Peak | Spacewatch | · | 2.0 km | MPC · JPL |
| 853149 | 2008 YQ_{112} | — | December 31, 2008 | Kitt Peak | Spacewatch | · | 1.4 km | MPC · JPL |
| 853150 | 2008 YC_{115} | — | December 21, 2008 | Kitt Peak | Spacewatch | · | 1.3 km | MPC · JPL |
| 853151 | 2008 YU_{132} | — | December 31, 2008 | Kitt Peak | Spacewatch | NYS | 610 m | MPC · JPL |
| 853152 | 2008 YK_{133} | — | December 29, 2008 | Kitt Peak | Spacewatch | · | 1.1 km | MPC · JPL |
| 853153 | 2008 YF_{136} | — | December 30, 2008 | Kitt Peak | Spacewatch | · | 1.1 km | MPC · JPL |
| 853154 | 2008 YT_{143} | — | December 30, 2008 | Kitt Peak | Spacewatch | EUN | 860 m | MPC · JPL |
| 853155 | 2008 YZ_{143} | — | December 30, 2008 | Kitt Peak | Spacewatch | · | 840 m | MPC · JPL |
| 853156 | 2008 YH_{144} | — | December 30, 2008 | Kitt Peak | Spacewatch | · | 1.1 km | MPC · JPL |
| 853157 | 2008 YQ_{150} | — | December 22, 2008 | Kitt Peak | Spacewatch | · | 610 m | MPC · JPL |
| 853158 | 2008 YL_{153} | — | December 21, 2008 | Mount Lemmon | Mount Lemmon Survey | · | 870 m | MPC · JPL |
| 853159 | 2008 YU_{154} | — | December 22, 2008 | Kitt Peak | Spacewatch | · | 1 km | MPC · JPL |
| 853160 | 2008 YX_{158} | — | December 30, 2008 | Kitt Peak | Spacewatch | · | 1.3 km | MPC · JPL |
| 853161 | 2008 YD_{159} | — | December 31, 2008 | Catalina | CSS | · | 1.7 km | MPC · JPL |
| 853162 | 2008 YA_{178} | — | February 14, 2013 | Mount Lemmon | Mount Lemmon Survey | · | 890 m | MPC · JPL |
| 853163 | 2008 YC_{179} | — | December 29, 2008 | Mount Lemmon | Mount Lemmon Survey | JUN | 740 m | MPC · JPL |
| 853164 | 2008 YM_{179} | — | July 19, 2015 | Haleakala | Pan-STARRS 1 | · | 1.1 km | MPC · JPL |
| 853165 | 2008 YX_{179} | — | December 29, 2008 | Mount Lemmon | Mount Lemmon Survey | H | 370 m | MPC · JPL |
| 853166 | 2008 YY_{179} | — | December 22, 2008 | Kitt Peak | Spacewatch | · | 860 m | MPC · JPL |
| 853167 | 2008 YE_{180} | — | December 22, 2008 | Kitt Peak | Spacewatch | EUN | 780 m | MPC · JPL |
| 853168 | 2008 YM_{180} | — | December 31, 2008 | Mount Lemmon | Mount Lemmon Survey | · | 910 m | MPC · JPL |
| 853169 | 2008 YE_{181} | — | December 21, 2008 | Kitt Peak | Spacewatch | · | 1.3 km | MPC · JPL |
| 853170 | 2008 YF_{181} | — | October 22, 2012 | Haleakala | Pan-STARRS 1 | · | 1.2 km | MPC · JPL |
| 853171 | 2008 YO_{181} | — | December 21, 2008 | Mount Lemmon | Mount Lemmon Survey | · | 540 m | MPC · JPL |
| 853172 | 2008 YV_{182} | — | December 22, 2008 | Mount Lemmon | Mount Lemmon Survey | · | 410 m | MPC · JPL |
| 853173 | 2008 YX_{182} | — | December 21, 2008 | Kitt Peak | Spacewatch | · | 2.3 km | MPC · JPL |
| 853174 | 2008 YS_{183} | — | August 22, 2012 | Haleakala | Pan-STARRS 1 | · | 1.2 km | MPC · JPL |
| 853175 | 2008 YX_{183} | — | November 19, 2008 | Mount Lemmon | Mount Lemmon Survey | (2076) | 720 m | MPC · JPL |
| 853176 | 2008 YB_{184} | — | May 30, 2003 | Cerro Tololo | Deep Ecliptic Survey | NYS | 730 m | MPC · JPL |
| 853177 | 2008 YK_{184} | — | December 21, 2008 | Catalina | CSS | · | 610 m | MPC · JPL |
| 853178 | 2008 YZ_{184} | — | December 22, 2008 | Mount Lemmon | Mount Lemmon Survey | · | 1.3 km | MPC · JPL |
| 853179 | 2008 YT_{185} | — | December 21, 2008 | Mount Lemmon | Mount Lemmon Survey | · | 700 m | MPC · JPL |
| 853180 | 2008 YX_{185} | — | January 18, 2013 | Mount Lemmon | Mount Lemmon Survey | MAS | 530 m | MPC · JPL |
| 853181 | 2008 YL_{186} | — | December 21, 2008 | Kitt Peak | Spacewatch | · | 820 m | MPC · JPL |
| 853182 | 2008 YS_{186} | — | June 21, 2017 | Haleakala | Pan-STARRS 1 | EOS | 1.4 km | MPC · JPL |
| 853183 | 2008 YU_{186} | — | December 30, 2008 | Kitt Peak | Spacewatch | · | 1.3 km | MPC · JPL |
| 853184 | 2008 YV_{188} | — | December 31, 2008 | Kitt Peak | Spacewatch | · | 1.1 km | MPC · JPL |
| 853185 | 2008 YG_{190} | — | December 21, 2008 | Mount Lemmon | Mount Lemmon Survey | · | 600 m | MPC · JPL |
| 853186 | 2008 YB_{191} | — | December 29, 2008 | Kitt Peak | Spacewatch | PHO | 860 m | MPC · JPL |
| 853187 | 2008 YP_{191} | — | December 29, 2008 | Kitt Peak | Spacewatch | V | 380 m | MPC · JPL |
| 853188 | 2008 YR_{191} | — | December 30, 2008 | Kitt Peak | Spacewatch | NYS | 810 m | MPC · JPL |
| 853189 | 2008 YL_{194} | — | December 22, 2008 | Kitt Peak | Spacewatch | MRX | 700 m | MPC · JPL |
| 853190 | 2008 YM_{194} | — | December 22, 2008 | Mount Lemmon | Mount Lemmon Survey | · | 1.7 km | MPC · JPL |
| 853191 | 2008 YF_{195} | — | December 30, 2008 | Mount Lemmon | Mount Lemmon Survey | · | 1.1 km | MPC · JPL |
| 853192 | 2008 YC_{197} | — | December 21, 2008 | Mount Lemmon | Mount Lemmon Survey | · | 740 m | MPC · JPL |
| 853193 | 2008 YA_{199} | — | December 31, 2008 | Kitt Peak | Spacewatch | · | 410 m | MPC · JPL |
| 853194 | 2009 AJ | — | January 1, 2009 | Nazaret | G. Muler, J. M. Ruiz | · | 1.8 km | MPC · JPL |
| 853195 | 2009 AG_{3} | — | November 30, 2008 | Mount Lemmon | Mount Lemmon Survey | · | 1.3 km | MPC · JPL |
| 853196 | 2009 AM_{4} | — | January 1, 2009 | Kitt Peak | Spacewatch | · | 1.3 km | MPC · JPL |
| 853197 | 2009 AX_{10} | — | January 2, 2009 | Mount Lemmon | Mount Lemmon Survey | · | 1.3 km | MPC · JPL |
| 853198 | 2009 AP_{14} | — | January 2, 2009 | Mount Lemmon | Mount Lemmon Survey | · | 1.1 km | MPC · JPL |
| 853199 | 2009 AC_{15} | — | December 22, 2008 | Kitt Peak | Spacewatch | · | 630 m | MPC · JPL |
| 853200 | 2009 AH_{19} | — | January 2, 2009 | Mount Lemmon | Mount Lemmon Survey | · | 2.6 km | MPC · JPL |

== 853201–853300 ==
back to top

| Designation | | | Discovery | | | Properties | | Ref |
| Permanent | Provisional | Named after | Date | Site | Discoverer(s) | Category | Diam. | Ref |
|---|---|---|---|---|---|---|---|---|
| 853201 | 2009 AC_{23} | — | December 30, 2008 | Kitt Peak | Spacewatch | · | 640 m | MPC · JPL |
| 853202 | 2009 AE_{25} | — | January 1, 2009 | Mount Lemmon | Mount Lemmon Survey | · | 1.3 km | MPC · JPL |
| 853203 | 2009 AX_{29} | — | December 21, 2008 | Mount Lemmon | Mount Lemmon Survey | · | 670 m | MPC · JPL |
| 853204 | 2009 AW_{30} | — | January 15, 2009 | Kitt Peak | Spacewatch | · | 500 m | MPC · JPL |
| 853205 | 2009 AU_{39} | — | December 22, 2008 | Mount Lemmon | Mount Lemmon Survey | · | 560 m | MPC · JPL |
| 853206 | 2009 AQ_{50} | — | December 30, 2008 | Kitt Peak | Spacewatch | H | 360 m | MPC · JPL |
| 853207 | 2009 AD_{54} | — | January 1, 2009 | Kitt Peak | Spacewatch | · | 1.4 km | MPC · JPL |
| 853208 | 2009 AG_{54} | — | July 4, 2016 | Haleakala | Pan-STARRS 1 | · | 1.4 km | MPC · JPL |
| 853209 | 2009 AL_{54} | — | September 21, 2017 | Haleakala | Pan-STARRS 1 | · | 1.5 km | MPC · JPL |
| 853210 | 2009 AX_{54} | — | January 2, 2009 | Mount Lemmon | Mount Lemmon Survey | · | 430 m | MPC · JPL |
| 853211 | 2009 AR_{55} | — | July 19, 2015 | Haleakala | Pan-STARRS 1 | · | 960 m | MPC · JPL |
| 853212 | 2009 AO_{56} | — | September 26, 2011 | Haleakala | Pan-STARRS 1 | · | 380 m | MPC · JPL |
| 853213 | 2009 AD_{57} | — | August 2, 2016 | Haleakala | Pan-STARRS 1 | · | 1.3 km | MPC · JPL |
| 853214 | 2009 AC_{58} | — | January 20, 2015 | Haleakala | Pan-STARRS 1 | THM | 1.6 km | MPC · JPL |
| 853215 | 2009 AP_{58} | — | January 3, 2009 | Mount Lemmon | Mount Lemmon Survey | · | 2.0 km | MPC · JPL |
| 853216 | 2009 AL_{60} | — | January 1, 2009 | Kitt Peak | Spacewatch | · | 2.7 km | MPC · JPL |
| 853217 | 2009 AM_{60} | — | January 2, 2009 | Kitt Peak | Spacewatch | · | 670 m | MPC · JPL |
| 853218 | 2009 AA_{61} | — | January 2, 2009 | Kitt Peak | Spacewatch | · | 1.3 km | MPC · JPL |
| 853219 | 2009 AN_{61} | — | January 2, 2009 | Mount Lemmon | Mount Lemmon Survey | H | 410 m | MPC · JPL |
| 853220 | 2009 AA_{62} | — | January 2, 2009 | Kitt Peak | Spacewatch | · | 980 m | MPC · JPL |
| 853221 | 2009 AW_{62} | — | January 3, 2009 | Mount Lemmon | Mount Lemmon Survey | (5) | 920 m | MPC · JPL |
| 853222 | 2009 AN_{63} | — | January 3, 2009 | Kitt Peak | Spacewatch | · | 560 m | MPC · JPL |
| 853223 | 2009 AV_{63} | — | January 2, 2009 | Kitt Peak | Spacewatch | V | 480 m | MPC · JPL |
| 853224 | 2009 AE_{65} | — | January 3, 2009 | Kitt Peak | Spacewatch | · | 720 m | MPC · JPL |
| 853225 | 2009 BZ_{13} | — | January 24, 2009 | Cerro Burek | I. de la Cueva | · | 1.2 km | MPC · JPL |
| 853226 | 2009 BP_{15} | — | January 2, 2009 | Kitt Peak | Spacewatch | · | 1.8 km | MPC · JPL |
| 853227 | 2009 BK_{18} | — | December 22, 2008 | Kitt Peak | Spacewatch | · | 530 m | MPC · JPL |
| 853228 | 2009 BP_{18} | — | December 22, 2008 | Mount Lemmon | Mount Lemmon Survey | · | 590 m | MPC · JPL |
| 853229 | 2009 BG_{19} | — | January 16, 2009 | Mount Lemmon | Mount Lemmon Survey | · | 960 m | MPC · JPL |
| 853230 | 2009 BM_{19} | — | January 2, 2009 | Mount Lemmon | Mount Lemmon Survey | · | 390 m | MPC · JPL |
| 853231 | 2009 BK_{20} | — | January 2, 2009 | Mount Lemmon | Mount Lemmon Survey | · | 1.2 km | MPC · JPL |
| 853232 | 2009 BG_{26} | — | January 16, 2009 | Kitt Peak | Spacewatch | MAS | 580 m | MPC · JPL |
| 853233 | 2009 BJ_{32} | — | January 16, 2009 | Kitt Peak | Spacewatch | · | 1.2 km | MPC · JPL |
| 853234 | 2009 BV_{32} | — | January 3, 2009 | Kitt Peak | Spacewatch | · | 1.6 km | MPC · JPL |
| 853235 | 2009 BP_{33} | — | January 16, 2009 | Kitt Peak | Spacewatch | H | 440 m | MPC · JPL |
| 853236 | 2009 BV_{40} | — | January 16, 2009 | Kitt Peak | Spacewatch | ERI | 1.1 km | MPC · JPL |
| 853237 | 2009 BM_{43} | — | January 16, 2009 | Kitt Peak | Spacewatch | PHO | 580 m | MPC · JPL |
| 853238 | 2009 BJ_{50} | — | January 16, 2009 | Mount Lemmon | Mount Lemmon Survey | · | 1.1 km | MPC · JPL |
| 853239 | 2009 BA_{56} | — | January 17, 2009 | Mount Lemmon | Mount Lemmon Survey | · | 750 m | MPC · JPL |
| 853240 | 2009 BG_{56} | — | January 17, 2009 | Mount Lemmon | Mount Lemmon Survey | · | 1.1 km | MPC · JPL |
| 853241 | 2009 BR_{63} | — | January 20, 2009 | Kitt Peak | Spacewatch | H | 370 m | MPC · JPL |
| 853242 | 2009 BS_{63} | — | January 20, 2009 | Kitt Peak | Spacewatch | · | 1.9 km | MPC · JPL |
| 853243 | 2009 BO_{87} | — | December 30, 2008 | Mount Lemmon | Mount Lemmon Survey | · | 1.2 km | MPC · JPL |
| 853244 | 2009 BX_{88} | — | January 25, 2009 | Kitt Peak | Spacewatch | V | 440 m | MPC · JPL |
| 853245 | 2009 BM_{94} | — | January 25, 2009 | Kitt Peak | Spacewatch | THB | 2.1 km | MPC · JPL |
| 853246 | 2009 BP_{95} | — | January 18, 2009 | Kitt Peak | Spacewatch | · | 960 m | MPC · JPL |
| 853247 | 2009 BQ_{95} | — | January 18, 2009 | Kitt Peak | Spacewatch | · | 950 m | MPC · JPL |
| 853248 | 2009 BT_{100} | — | January 1, 2009 | Kitt Peak | Spacewatch | · | 1.2 km | MPC · JPL |
| 853249 | 2009 BV_{100} | — | January 29, 2009 | Kitt Peak | Spacewatch | · | 850 m | MPC · JPL |
| 853250 | 2009 BL_{104} | — | January 25, 2009 | Kitt Peak | Spacewatch | T_{j} (2.94) | 1.9 km | MPC · JPL |
| 853251 | 2009 BK_{109} | — | January 30, 2009 | Mount Lemmon | Mount Lemmon Survey | · | 2.2 km | MPC · JPL |
| 853252 | 2009 BM_{113} | — | January 26, 2009 | Mount Lemmon | Mount Lemmon Survey | · | 1.1 km | MPC · JPL |
| 853253 | 2009 BD_{118} | — | January 3, 2009 | Kitt Peak | Spacewatch | · | 430 m | MPC · JPL |
| 853254 | 2009 BZ_{118} | — | December 30, 2008 | Mount Lemmon | Mount Lemmon Survey | · | 2.1 km | MPC · JPL |
| 853255 | 2009 BD_{119} | — | January 2, 2009 | Mount Lemmon | Mount Lemmon Survey | · | 550 m | MPC · JPL |
| 853256 | 2009 BJ_{119} | — | January 30, 2009 | Mount Lemmon | Mount Lemmon Survey | · | 1 km | MPC · JPL |
| 853257 | 2009 BZ_{120} | — | January 20, 2009 | Mount Lemmon | Mount Lemmon Survey | · | 700 m | MPC · JPL |
| 853258 | 2009 BE_{122} | — | January 20, 2009 | Kitt Peak | Spacewatch | NYS | 830 m | MPC · JPL |
| 853259 | 2009 BJ_{126} | — | January 29, 2009 | Kitt Peak | Spacewatch | · | 1.1 km | MPC · JPL |
| 853260 | 2009 BQ_{131} | — | January 27, 2009 | XuYi | PMO NEO Survey Program | (194) | 1.5 km | MPC · JPL |
| 853261 | 2009 BP_{135} | — | January 25, 2009 | Kitt Peak | Spacewatch | NYS | 620 m | MPC · JPL |
| 853262 | 2009 BT_{136} | — | January 29, 2009 | Kitt Peak | Spacewatch | · | 1.2 km | MPC · JPL |
| 853263 | 2009 BX_{139} | — | January 29, 2009 | Kitt Peak | Spacewatch | · | 1.2 km | MPC · JPL |
| 853264 | 2009 BZ_{143} | — | January 30, 2009 | Kitt Peak | Spacewatch | · | 600 m | MPC · JPL |
| 853265 | 2009 BF_{144} | — | January 20, 2009 | Kitt Peak | Spacewatch | MAS | 510 m | MPC · JPL |
| 853266 | 2009 BH_{144} | — | January 20, 2009 | Kitt Peak | Spacewatch | · | 2.1 km | MPC · JPL |
| 853267 | 2009 BG_{146} | — | January 30, 2009 | Mount Lemmon | Mount Lemmon Survey | H | 320 m | MPC · JPL |
| 853268 | 2009 BJ_{151} | — | January 29, 2009 | Catalina | CSS | T_{j} (2.94) | 2.5 km | MPC · JPL |
| 853269 | 2009 BN_{154} | — | January 31, 2009 | Kitt Peak | Spacewatch | · | 450 m | MPC · JPL |
| 853270 | 2009 BP_{157} | — | January 31, 2009 | Kitt Peak | Spacewatch | · | 860 m | MPC · JPL |
| 853271 | 2009 BE_{162} | — | January 29, 2009 | Mount Lemmon | Mount Lemmon Survey | · | 500 m | MPC · JPL |
| 853272 | 2009 BB_{167} | — | January 31, 2009 | Kitt Peak | Spacewatch | · | 770 m | MPC · JPL |
| 853273 | 2009 BG_{170} | — | January 18, 2009 | Mount Lemmon | Mount Lemmon Survey | · | 750 m | MPC · JPL |
| 853274 | 2009 BG_{175} | — | January 27, 2009 | XuYi | PMO NEO Survey Program | · | 1.2 km | MPC · JPL |
| 853275 | 2009 BP_{181} | — | November 24, 2008 | Mount Lemmon | Mount Lemmon Survey | · | 1.4 km | MPC · JPL |
| 853276 | 2009 BR_{194} | — | January 20, 2009 | Catalina | CSS | · | 1.4 km | MPC · JPL |
| 853277 | 2009 BA_{195} | — | January 20, 2009 | Mount Lemmon | Mount Lemmon Survey | H | 350 m | MPC · JPL |
| 853278 | 2009 BH_{195} | — | October 17, 2012 | Haleakala | Pan-STARRS 1 | · | 1.2 km | MPC · JPL |
| 853279 | 2009 BG_{196} | — | September 30, 2011 | Kitt Peak | Spacewatch | · | 510 m | MPC · JPL |
| 853280 | 2009 BJ_{196} | — | September 22, 2012 | Mount Lemmon | Mount Lemmon Survey | MRX | 730 m | MPC · JPL |
| 853281 | 2009 BE_{197} | — | January 16, 2009 | Kitt Peak | Spacewatch | · | 960 m | MPC · JPL |
| 853282 | 2009 BS_{197} | — | December 28, 2017 | Mount Lemmon | Mount Lemmon Survey | HNS | 860 m | MPC · JPL |
| 853283 | 2009 BY_{197} | — | January 25, 2009 | Kitt Peak | Spacewatch | MAS | 480 m | MPC · JPL |
| 853284 | 2009 BE_{198} | — | January 16, 2009 | Kitt Peak | Spacewatch | · | 830 m | MPC · JPL |
| 853285 | 2009 BG_{198} | — | January 20, 2009 | Mount Lemmon | Mount Lemmon Survey | · | 2.3 km | MPC · JPL |
| 853286 | 2009 BT_{200} | — | January 20, 2009 | Kitt Peak | Spacewatch | · | 2.2 km | MPC · JPL |
| 853287 | 2009 BE_{201} | — | February 5, 2014 | Mount Lemmon | Mount Lemmon Survey | · | 1.5 km | MPC · JPL |
| 853288 | 2009 BC_{202} | — | April 3, 2017 | Haleakala | Pan-STARRS 1 | · | 890 m | MPC · JPL |
| 853289 | 2009 BF_{202} | — | December 23, 2012 | Haleakala | Pan-STARRS 1 | · | 860 m | MPC · JPL |
| 853290 | 2009 BE_{203} | — | December 29, 2011 | Mount Lemmon | Mount Lemmon Survey | · | 440 m | MPC · JPL |
| 853291 | 2009 BL_{206} | — | January 17, 2009 | Kitt Peak | Spacewatch | · | 730 m | MPC · JPL |
| 853292 | 2009 BT_{207} | — | January 16, 2009 | Kitt Peak | Spacewatch | HOF | 1.8 km | MPC · JPL |
| 853293 | 2009 BA_{209} | — | January 20, 2009 | Mount Lemmon | Mount Lemmon Survey | DOR | 1.9 km | MPC · JPL |
| 853294 | 2009 BH_{209} | — | January 21, 2009 | Mount Lemmon | Mount Lemmon Survey | H | 320 m | MPC · JPL |
| 853295 | 2009 BX_{209} | — | January 21, 2009 | Bergisch Gladbach | W. Bickel | · | 2.7 km | MPC · JPL |
| 853296 | 2009 BZ_{209} | — | January 20, 2009 | Kitt Peak | Spacewatch | · | 920 m | MPC · JPL |
| 853297 | 2009 BO_{212} | — | January 18, 2009 | Kitt Peak | Spacewatch | · | 2.2 km | MPC · JPL |
| 853298 | 2009 BD_{214} | — | January 16, 2009 | Mount Lemmon | Mount Lemmon Survey | · | 770 m | MPC · JPL |
| 853299 | 2009 BH_{214} | — | January 18, 2009 | Kitt Peak | Spacewatch | · | 840 m | MPC · JPL |
| 853300 | 2009 BM_{214} | — | January 20, 2009 | Catalina | CSS | · | 1.5 km | MPC · JPL |

== 853301–853400 ==
back to top

| Designation | | | Discovery | | | Properties | | Ref |
| Permanent | Provisional | Named after | Date | Site | Discoverer(s) | Category | Diam. | Ref |
|---|---|---|---|---|---|---|---|---|
| 853301 | 2009 BY_{214} | — | January 30, 2009 | Mount Lemmon | Mount Lemmon Survey | · | 980 m | MPC · JPL |
| 853302 | 2009 BZ_{214} | — | January 31, 2009 | Mount Lemmon | Mount Lemmon Survey | · | 880 m | MPC · JPL |
| 853303 | 2009 BS_{215} | — | January 16, 2009 | Mount Lemmon | Mount Lemmon Survey | NYS | 730 m | MPC · JPL |
| 853304 | 2009 BT_{217} | — | January 29, 2009 | Mount Lemmon | Mount Lemmon Survey | · | 520 m | MPC · JPL |
| 853305 | 2009 BO_{218} | — | January 30, 2009 | Mount Lemmon | Mount Lemmon Survey | · | 820 m | MPC · JPL |
| 853306 | 2009 BS_{218} | — | January 30, 2009 | Mount Lemmon | Mount Lemmon Survey | · | 1.5 km | MPC · JPL |
| 853307 | 2009 CN_{1} | — | January 29, 2009 | Kitt Peak | Spacewatch | H | 370 m | MPC · JPL |
| 853308 | 2009 CN_{7} | — | February 1, 2009 | Kitt Peak | Spacewatch | H | 370 m | MPC · JPL |
| 853309 | 2009 CS_{10} | — | February 1, 2009 | Mount Lemmon | Mount Lemmon Survey | · | 780 m | MPC · JPL |
| 853310 | 2009 CM_{18} | — | January 20, 2009 | Mount Lemmon | Mount Lemmon Survey | · | 530 m | MPC · JPL |
| 853311 | 2009 CP_{19} | — | October 26, 2011 | Haleakala | Pan-STARRS 1 | · | 710 m | MPC · JPL |
| 853312 | 2009 CH_{21} | — | January 18, 2009 | Kitt Peak | Spacewatch | · | 900 m | MPC · JPL |
| 853313 | 2009 CY_{22} | — | February 1, 2009 | Kitt Peak | Spacewatch | · | 880 m | MPC · JPL |
| 853314 | 2009 CR_{23} | — | February 1, 2009 | Kitt Peak | Spacewatch | · | 560 m | MPC · JPL |
| 853315 | 2009 CE_{29} | — | February 1, 2009 | Kitt Peak | Spacewatch | · | 720 m | MPC · JPL |
| 853316 | 2009 CT_{35} | — | February 2, 2009 | Mount Lemmon | Mount Lemmon Survey | ADE | 1.5 km | MPC · JPL |
| 853317 | 2009 CV_{36} | — | February 3, 2009 | Kitt Peak | Spacewatch | BRG | 1.2 km | MPC · JPL |
| 853318 | 2009 CW_{44} | — | January 18, 2009 | Kitt Peak | Spacewatch | THB | 2.0 km | MPC · JPL |
| 853319 | 2009 CM_{48} | — | February 14, 2009 | Kitt Peak | Spacewatch | · | 1.5 km | MPC · JPL |
| 853320 | 2009 CY_{48} | — | January 15, 2009 | Kitt Peak | Spacewatch | · | 950 m | MPC · JPL |
| 853321 | 2009 CL_{51} | — | February 3, 2009 | Kitt Peak | Spacewatch | · | 1.0 km | MPC · JPL |
| 853322 | 2009 CK_{56} | — | February 2, 2009 | Kitt Peak | Spacewatch | · | 1.0 km | MPC · JPL |
| 853323 | 2009 CM_{66} | — | January 20, 2009 | Mount Lemmon | Mount Lemmon Survey | · | 460 m | MPC · JPL |
| 853324 | 2009 CF_{67} | — | February 1, 2009 | Kitt Peak | Spacewatch | · | 1.4 km | MPC · JPL |
| 853325 | 2009 CV_{68} | — | January 18, 2009 | Kitt Peak | Spacewatch | · | 690 m | MPC · JPL |
| 853326 | 2009 CA_{69} | — | February 4, 2009 | Mount Lemmon | Mount Lemmon Survey | · | 1.3 km | MPC · JPL |
| 853327 | 2009 CA_{70} | — | September 18, 2011 | Mount Lemmon | Mount Lemmon Survey | · | 540 m | MPC · JPL |
| 853328 | 2009 CC_{70} | — | February 1, 2009 | Kitt Peak | Spacewatch | · | 1.2 km | MPC · JPL |
| 853329 | 2009 CF_{70} | — | February 3, 2009 | Mount Lemmon | Mount Lemmon Survey | H | 370 m | MPC · JPL |
| 853330 | 2009 CP_{71} | — | January 17, 2016 | Haleakala | Pan-STARRS 1 | · | 580 m | MPC · JPL |
| 853331 | 2009 CD_{72} | — | January 14, 2016 | Haleakala | Pan-STARRS 1 | · | 700 m | MPC · JPL |
| 853332 | 2009 CF_{72} | — | January 18, 2009 | Kitt Peak | Spacewatch | · | 600 m | MPC · JPL |
| 853333 | 2009 CM_{72} | — | August 29, 2011 | Nizhny Arkhyz | A. Novichonok, V. Gerke | · | 630 m | MPC · JPL |
| 853334 | 2009 CZ_{72} | — | November 7, 2012 | Haleakala | Pan-STARRS 1 | · | 1.4 km | MPC · JPL |
| 853335 | 2009 CC_{73} | — | July 25, 2015 | Haleakala | Pan-STARRS 1 | · | 1.4 km | MPC · JPL |
| 853336 | 2009 CS_{73} | — | December 9, 2015 | Haleakala | Pan-STARRS 1 | · | 470 m | MPC · JPL |
| 853337 | 2009 CD_{74} | — | July 8, 2018 | Haleakala | Pan-STARRS 1 | · | 1.5 km | MPC · JPL |
| 853338 | 2009 CU_{74} | — | February 2, 2009 | Kitt Peak | Spacewatch | · | 780 m | MPC · JPL |
| 853339 | 2009 CX_{75} | — | February 4, 2009 | Mount Lemmon | Mount Lemmon Survey | NYS | 780 m | MPC · JPL |
| 853340 | 2009 CH_{76} | — | February 1, 2009 | Mount Lemmon | Mount Lemmon Survey | V | 420 m | MPC · JPL |
| 853341 | 2009 CD_{78} | — | February 1, 2009 | Mount Lemmon | Mount Lemmon Survey | · | 1.0 km | MPC · JPL |
| 853342 | 2009 CW_{78} | — | February 3, 2009 | Kitt Peak | Spacewatch | · | 1.3 km | MPC · JPL |
| 853343 | 2009 CJ_{79} | — | February 1, 2009 | Kitt Peak | Spacewatch | · | 460 m | MPC · JPL |
| 853344 | 2009 DA | — | September 10, 2007 | Kitt Peak | Spacewatch | · | 1.3 km | MPC · JPL |
| 853345 | 2009 DC_{3} | — | January 17, 2009 | Mount Lemmon | Mount Lemmon Survey | · | 380 m | MPC · JPL |
| 853346 | 2009 DG_{7} | — | February 19, 2009 | Kitt Peak | Spacewatch | V | 410 m | MPC · JPL |
| 853347 | 2009 DZ_{12} | — | February 16, 2009 | Kitt Peak | Spacewatch | PHO | 690 m | MPC · JPL |
| 853348 | 2009 DV_{17} | — | February 4, 2009 | Kitt Peak | Spacewatch | · | 1.6 km | MPC · JPL |
| 853349 | 2009 DE_{20} | — | January 15, 2009 | Kitt Peak | Spacewatch | · | 1.3 km | MPC · JPL |
| 853350 | 2009 DW_{26} | — | February 5, 2009 | Kitt Peak | Spacewatch | H | 350 m | MPC · JPL |
| 853351 | 2009 DF_{28} | — | January 25, 2009 | Kitt Peak | Spacewatch | · | 1.4 km | MPC · JPL |
| 853352 | 2009 DW_{29} | — | February 23, 2009 | Calar Alto | F. Hormuth | AST | 1.2 km | MPC · JPL |
| 853353 | 2009 DV_{36} | — | February 23, 2009 | Calar Alto | F. Hormuth | · | 1.5 km | MPC · JPL |
| 853354 | 2009 DC_{41} | — | February 1, 2009 | Mount Lemmon | Mount Lemmon Survey | PHO | 770 m | MPC · JPL |
| 853355 | 2009 DR_{43} | — | February 24, 2009 | Calar Alto | F. Hormuth | MAS | 610 m | MPC · JPL |
| 853356 | 2009 DH_{44} | — | February 20, 2009 | Mount Lemmon | Mount Lemmon Survey | · | 1.2 km | MPC · JPL |
| 853357 | 2009 DG_{46} | — | February 27, 2009 | Kitt Peak | Spacewatch | · | 950 m | MPC · JPL |
| 853358 | 2009 DL_{46} | — | February 28, 2009 | Catalina | CSS | AMO · APO · PHA | 140 m | MPC · JPL |
| 853359 | 2009 DB_{53} | — | February 22, 2009 | Kitt Peak | Spacewatch | · | 490 m | MPC · JPL |
| 853360 | 2009 DF_{56} | — | February 14, 2009 | Kitt Peak | Spacewatch | · | 2.0 km | MPC · JPL |
| 853361 | 2009 DH_{59} | — | February 22, 2009 | Kitt Peak | Spacewatch | NYS | 750 m | MPC · JPL |
| 853362 | 2009 DK_{61} | — | February 22, 2009 | Kitt Peak | Spacewatch | H | 290 m | MPC · JPL |
| 853363 | 2009 DE_{62} | — | February 22, 2009 | Kitt Peak | Spacewatch | · | 1.0 km | MPC · JPL |
| 853364 | 2009 DR_{71} | — | February 1, 2009 | Catalina | CSS | PHO | 860 m | MPC · JPL |
| 853365 | 2009 DB_{72} | — | February 21, 2009 | Kitt Peak | Spacewatch | · | 960 m | MPC · JPL |
| 853366 | 2009 DK_{79} | — | February 21, 2009 | Kitt Peak | Spacewatch | MAS | 550 m | MPC · JPL |
| 853367 | 2009 DN_{81} | — | February 24, 2009 | Kitt Peak | Spacewatch | · | 1.7 km | MPC · JPL |
| 853368 | 2009 DM_{86} | — | February 13, 2009 | Kitt Peak | Spacewatch | BAR | 1.0 km | MPC · JPL |
| 853369 | 2009 DJ_{91} | — | March 24, 2006 | Mount Lemmon | Mount Lemmon Survey | · | 390 m | MPC · JPL |
| 853370 | 2009 DF_{92} | — | February 20, 2009 | Kitt Peak | Spacewatch | · | 840 m | MPC · JPL |
| 853371 | 2009 DD_{96} | — | January 25, 2009 | Bergisch Gladbach | W. Bickel | JUN | 770 m | MPC · JPL |
| 853372 | 2009 DX_{98} | — | February 22, 2009 | Kitt Peak | Spacewatch | · | 740 m | MPC · JPL |
| 853373 | 2009 DP_{99} | — | February 26, 2009 | Kitt Peak | Spacewatch | · | 1.0 km | MPC · JPL |
| 853374 | 2009 DP_{100} | — | February 26, 2009 | Kitt Peak | Spacewatch | · | 1.1 km | MPC · JPL |
| 853375 | 2009 DG_{116} | — | February 27, 2009 | Kitt Peak | Spacewatch | NYS | 570 m | MPC · JPL |
| 853376 | 2009 DN_{132} | — | February 20, 2009 | Kitt Peak | Spacewatch | · | 1.5 km | MPC · JPL |
| 853377 | 2009 DT_{135} | — | February 26, 2009 | Cerro Burek | I. de la Cueva | · | 1.5 km | MPC · JPL |
| 853378 | 2009 DV_{141} | — | December 29, 2008 | Mount Lemmon | Mount Lemmon Survey | H | 390 m | MPC · JPL |
| 853379 | 2009 DS_{147} | — | March 17, 2013 | Mount Lemmon | Mount Lemmon Survey | MAS | 560 m | MPC · JPL |
| 853380 | 2009 DV_{147} | — | February 22, 2009 | Catalina | CSS | H | 420 m | MPC · JPL |
| 853381 | 2009 DA_{148} | — | February 20, 2009 | Siding Spring | SSS | · | 2.0 km | MPC · JPL |
| 853382 | 2009 DN_{148} | — | February 20, 2009 | Mount Lemmon | Mount Lemmon Survey | · | 730 m | MPC · JPL |
| 853383 | 2009 DS_{148} | — | February 26, 2009 | Mount Lemmon | Mount Lemmon Survey | · | 430 m | MPC · JPL |
| 853384 | 2009 DX_{148} | — | April 17, 2013 | Haleakala | Pan-STARRS 1 | · | 520 m | MPC · JPL |
| 853385 | 2009 DX_{150} | — | July 14, 2013 | Haleakala | Pan-STARRS 1 | · | 380 m | MPC · JPL |
| 853386 | 2009 DB_{151} | — | February 19, 2009 | Mount Lemmon | Mount Lemmon Survey | · | 1.1 km | MPC · JPL |
| 853387 | 2009 DT_{151} | — | April 5, 2014 | Haleakala | Pan-STARRS 1 | · | 1.1 km | MPC · JPL |
| 853388 | 2009 DV_{151} | — | February 28, 2009 | Kitt Peak | Spacewatch | · | 390 m | MPC · JPL |
| 853389 | 2009 DQ_{154} | — | February 26, 2009 | Kitt Peak | Spacewatch | · | 870 m | MPC · JPL |
| 853390 | 2009 DN_{155} | — | February 19, 2009 | Mount Lemmon | Mount Lemmon Survey | V | 450 m | MPC · JPL |
| 853391 | 2009 DW_{156} | — | February 24, 2009 | Kitt Peak | Spacewatch | · | 1.1 km | MPC · JPL |
| 853392 | 2009 DW_{157} | — | February 26, 2009 | Mount Lemmon | Mount Lemmon Survey | · | 920 m | MPC · JPL |
| 853393 | 2009 DP_{158} | — | February 20, 2009 | Kitt Peak | Spacewatch | · | 670 m | MPC · JPL |
| 853394 | 2009 DU_{160} | — | February 20, 2009 | Mount Lemmon | Mount Lemmon Survey | · | 1.1 km | MPC · JPL |
| 853395 | 2009 DB_{161} | — | February 19, 2009 | Kitt Peak | Spacewatch | MAS | 620 m | MPC · JPL |
| 853396 | 2009 DF_{162} | — | March 23, 2009 | Mount Lemmon | Mount Lemmon Survey | · | 680 m | MPC · JPL |
| 853397 | 2009 DW_{162} | — | February 20, 2009 | Mount Lemmon | Mount Lemmon Survey | · | 1.0 km | MPC · JPL |
| 853398 | 2009 EK_{5} | — | March 1, 2009 | Mount Lemmon | Mount Lemmon Survey | HNS | 660 m | MPC · JPL |
| 853399 | 2009 EM_{6} | — | March 1, 2009 | Mount Lemmon | Mount Lemmon Survey | · | 2.5 km | MPC · JPL |
| 853400 | 2009 EX_{12} | — | March 3, 2009 | Catalina | CSS | T_{j} (2.93) | 2.2 km | MPC · JPL |

== 853401–853500 ==
back to top

| Designation | | | Discovery | | | Properties | | Ref |
| Permanent | Provisional | Named after | Date | Site | Discoverer(s) | Category | Diam. | Ref |
|---|---|---|---|---|---|---|---|---|
| 853401 | 2009 EM_{14} | — | January 31, 2009 | Mount Lemmon | Mount Lemmon Survey | · | 2.0 km | MPC · JPL |
| 853402 | 2009 EU_{17} | — | March 3, 2009 | Kitt Peak | Spacewatch | · | 1.1 km | MPC · JPL |
| 853403 | 2009 EY_{23} | — | March 3, 2009 | Kitt Peak | Spacewatch | · | 960 m | MPC · JPL |
| 853404 | 2009 EP_{29} | — | March 3, 2009 | Kitt Peak | Spacewatch | · | 540 m | MPC · JPL |
| 853405 | 2009 EX_{29} | — | March 7, 2009 | Mount Lemmon | Mount Lemmon Survey | · | 1.1 km | MPC · JPL |
| 853406 | 2009 ED_{34} | — | February 14, 2015 | Mount Lemmon | Mount Lemmon Survey | · | 2.8 km | MPC · JPL |
| 853407 | 2009 EH_{34} | — | September 24, 2011 | Mount Lemmon | Mount Lemmon Survey | · | 840 m | MPC · JPL |
| 853408 | 2009 EW_{34} | — | June 18, 2013 | Haleakala | Pan-STARRS 1 | · | 600 m | MPC · JPL |
| 853409 | 2009 EA_{35} | — | September 25, 2011 | Haleakala | Pan-STARRS 1 | · | 750 m | MPC · JPL |
| 853410 | 2009 EL_{35} | — | March 2, 2009 | Mount Lemmon | Mount Lemmon Survey | · | 770 m | MPC · JPL |
| 853411 | 2009 ES_{35} | — | November 25, 2011 | Haleakala | Pan-STARRS 1 | · | 700 m | MPC · JPL |
| 853412 | 2009 EB_{36} | — | July 1, 2014 | Haleakala | Pan-STARRS 1 | · | 930 m | MPC · JPL |
| 853413 | 2009 EG_{36} | — | March 31, 2014 | Mount Lemmon | Mount Lemmon Survey | · | 1.6 km | MPC · JPL |
| 853414 | 2009 ER_{36} | — | October 23, 2011 | Haleakala | Pan-STARRS 1 | · | 580 m | MPC · JPL |
| 853415 | 2009 EU_{36} | — | March 15, 2009 | Catalina | CSS | (1547) | 1.2 km | MPC · JPL |
| 853416 | 2009 EM_{37} | — | January 14, 2018 | Haleakala | Pan-STARRS 1 | AGN | 790 m | MPC · JPL |
| 853417 | 2009 ES_{37} | — | January 14, 2018 | Haleakala | Pan-STARRS 1 | HOF | 1.7 km | MPC · JPL |
| 853418 | 2009 EB_{39} | — | March 3, 2009 | Kitt Peak | Spacewatch | MAS | 550 m | MPC · JPL |
| 853419 | 2009 EV_{39} | — | March 3, 2009 | Mount Lemmon | Mount Lemmon Survey | NYS | 970 m | MPC · JPL |
| 853420 | 2009 EQ_{40} | — | March 2, 2009 | Mount Lemmon | Mount Lemmon Survey | · | 1.6 km | MPC · JPL |
| 853421 | 2009 EV_{40} | — | March 2, 2009 | Kitt Peak | Spacewatch | · | 1.5 km | MPC · JPL |
| 853422 | 2009 EY_{41} | — | March 3, 2009 | Mount Lemmon | Mount Lemmon Survey | · | 810 m | MPC · JPL |
| 853423 | 2009 FN_{4} | — | March 19, 2009 | Pla D'Arguines | R. Ferrando, Segarra, C. | · | 1.1 km | MPC · JPL |
| 853424 | 2009 FU_{4} | — | February 5, 2009 | Mount Lemmon | Mount Lemmon Survey | APO +1km · PHA | 960 m | MPC · JPL |
| 853425 | 2009 FF_{5} | — | February 2, 2005 | Kitt Peak | Spacewatch | · | 870 m | MPC · JPL |
| 853426 | 2009 FL_{8} | — | February 24, 2009 | Kitt Peak | Spacewatch | NYS | 690 m | MPC · JPL |
| 853427 | 2009 FG_{9} | — | February 28, 2009 | Kitt Peak | Spacewatch | · | 1.1 km | MPC · JPL |
| 853428 | 2009 FU_{10} | — | March 18, 2009 | Mount Lemmon | Mount Lemmon Survey | · | 530 m | MPC · JPL |
| 853429 | 2009 FP_{11} | — | February 1, 2009 | Kitt Peak | Spacewatch | · | 1.3 km | MPC · JPL |
| 853430 | 2009 FF_{13} | — | March 3, 2009 | Mount Lemmon | Mount Lemmon Survey | MAS | 570 m | MPC · JPL |
| 853431 | 2009 FL_{16} | — | February 3, 2009 | Kitt Peak | Spacewatch | · | 1.0 km | MPC · JPL |
| 853432 | 2009 FH_{19} | — | February 20, 2009 | Mount Lemmon | Mount Lemmon Survey | T_{j} (2.99) | 2.4 km | MPC · JPL |
| 853433 | 2009 FN_{34} | — | March 16, 2009 | Kitt Peak | Spacewatch | · | 1.3 km | MPC · JPL |
| 853434 | 2009 FM_{36} | — | March 16, 2009 | Kitt Peak | Spacewatch | · | 1.6 km | MPC · JPL |
| 853435 | 2009 FW_{36} | — | February 28, 2009 | Kitt Peak | Spacewatch | LIX | 2.5 km | MPC · JPL |
| 853436 | 2009 FJ_{54} | — | March 17, 2009 | Kitt Peak | Spacewatch | · | 680 m | MPC · JPL |
| 853437 | 2009 FK_{65} | — | March 18, 2009 | Mount Lemmon | Mount Lemmon Survey | · | 920 m | MPC · JPL |
| 853438 | 2009 FE_{67} | — | March 18, 2009 | Kitt Peak | Spacewatch | (1547) | 1.1 km | MPC · JPL |
| 853439 | 2009 FS_{70} | — | March 21, 2009 | Kitt Peak | Spacewatch | · | 1.4 km | MPC · JPL |
| 853440 | 2009 FL_{84} | — | March 24, 2009 | Kitt Peak | Spacewatch | · | 880 m | MPC · JPL |
| 853441 | 2009 FA_{85} | — | September 17, 2014 | Haleakala | Pan-STARRS 1 | · | 740 m | MPC · JPL |
| 853442 | 2009 FC_{85} | — | April 30, 2014 | Haleakala | Pan-STARRS 1 | · | 1.5 km | MPC · JPL |
| 853443 | 2009 FP_{85} | — | February 21, 2009 | Kitt Peak | Spacewatch | AGN | 860 m | MPC · JPL |
| 853444 | 2009 FL_{88} | — | March 29, 2009 | Mount Lemmon | Mount Lemmon Survey | · | 500 m | MPC · JPL |
| 853445 | 2009 FW_{88} | — | June 18, 2013 | Haleakala | Pan-STARRS 1 | · | 540 m | MPC · JPL |
| 853446 | 2009 FX_{88} | — | March 18, 2009 | Kitt Peak | Spacewatch | NYS | 790 m | MPC · JPL |
| 853447 | 2009 FG_{93} | — | March 24, 2009 | Mount Lemmon | Mount Lemmon Survey | · | 800 m | MPC · JPL |
| 853448 | 2009 FB_{95} | — | May 21, 2015 | Cerro Tololo | DECam | EOS | 1.2 km | MPC · JPL |
| 853449 | 2009 FZ_{97} | — | March 19, 2009 | Kitt Peak | Spacewatch | · | 580 m | MPC · JPL |
| 853450 | 2009 GU_{5} | — | April 2, 2009 | Kitt Peak | Spacewatch | · | 1.1 km | MPC · JPL |
| 853451 | 2009 GJ_{7} | — | April 2, 2009 | Mount Lemmon | Mount Lemmon Survey | · | 780 m | MPC · JPL |
| 853452 | 2009 GR_{7} | — | April 2, 2009 | Kitt Peak | Spacewatch | · | 920 m | MPC · JPL |
| 853453 | 2009 GR_{8} | — | September 3, 2013 | Kitt Peak | Spacewatch | · | 440 m | MPC · JPL |
| 853454 | 2009 GW_{9} | — | April 2, 2009 | Mount Lemmon | Mount Lemmon Survey | · | 940 m | MPC · JPL |
| 853455 | 2009 GH_{10} | — | April 2, 2009 | Kitt Peak | Spacewatch | · | 1.1 km | MPC · JPL |
| 853456 | 2009 GU_{10} | — | April 2, 2009 | Kitt Peak | Spacewatch | NYS | 760 m | MPC · JPL |
| 853457 | 2009 HL_{8} | — | April 17, 2009 | Kitt Peak | Spacewatch | · | 800 m | MPC · JPL |
| 853458 | 2009 HQ_{21} | — | March 27, 2009 | Mount Lemmon | Mount Lemmon Survey | · | 1.5 km | MPC · JPL |
| 853459 | 2009 HJ_{23} | — | April 17, 2009 | Mount Lemmon | Mount Lemmon Survey | · | 490 m | MPC · JPL |
| 853460 | 2009 HX_{23} | — | April 17, 2009 | Mount Lemmon | Mount Lemmon Survey | · | 860 m | MPC · JPL |
| 853461 | 2009 HQ_{27} | — | October 21, 2007 | Mount Lemmon | Mount Lemmon Survey | · | 1.8 km | MPC · JPL |
| 853462 | 2009 HV_{28} | — | April 18, 2009 | Mount Lemmon | Mount Lemmon Survey | PHO | 710 m | MPC · JPL |
| 853463 | 2009 HN_{36} | — | April 19, 2009 | Piszkéstető | K. Sárneczky | · | 720 m | MPC · JPL |
| 853464 | 2009 HT_{37} | — | March 31, 2009 | Kitt Peak | Spacewatch | · | 1.4 km | MPC · JPL |
| 853465 | 2009 HF_{38} | — | April 18, 2009 | Kitt Peak | Spacewatch | · | 760 m | MPC · JPL |
| 853466 | 2009 HP_{40} | — | April 1, 2009 | Mount Lemmon | Mount Lemmon Survey | PHO | 600 m | MPC · JPL |
| 853467 | 2009 HA_{51} | — | April 21, 2009 | Mount Lemmon | Mount Lemmon Survey | ADE | 1.5 km | MPC · JPL |
| 853468 | 2009 HU_{54} | — | April 20, 2009 | Kitt Peak | Spacewatch | EUN | 850 m | MPC · JPL |
| 853469 | 2009 HH_{58} | — | April 20, 2009 | Mount Lemmon | Mount Lemmon Survey | · | 780 m | MPC · JPL |
| 853470 | 2009 HS_{58} | — | December 22, 2008 | Catalina | CSS | T_{j} (2.87) | 2.9 km | MPC · JPL |
| 853471 | 2009 HJ_{63} | — | April 22, 2009 | Mount Lemmon | Mount Lemmon Survey | · | 750 m | MPC · JPL |
| 853472 | 2009 HJ_{67} | — | April 26, 2009 | Mount Lemmon | Mount Lemmon Survey | · | 1.0 km | MPC · JPL |
| 853473 | 2009 HC_{76} | — | April 24, 2009 | Mount Lemmon | Mount Lemmon Survey | · | 950 m | MPC · JPL |
| 853474 | 2009 HH_{76} | — | March 2, 2009 | Mount Lemmon | Mount Lemmon Survey | · | 570 m | MPC · JPL |
| 853475 | 2009 HL_{77} | — | March 28, 2009 | Kitt Peak | Spacewatch | · | 1.3 km | MPC · JPL |
| 853476 | 2009 HH_{78} | — | April 24, 2009 | Mount Lemmon | Mount Lemmon Survey | · | 900 m | MPC · JPL |
| 853477 | 2009 HQ_{78} | — | March 19, 2009 | Kitt Peak | Spacewatch | · | 1.5 km | MPC · JPL |
| 853478 | 2009 HY_{81} | — | April 19, 2009 | Mount Lemmon | Mount Lemmon Survey | H | 320 m | MPC · JPL |
| 853479 | 2009 HM_{83} | — | March 19, 2009 | Mount Lemmon | Mount Lemmon Survey | · | 1.6 km | MPC · JPL |
| 853480 | 2009 HF_{85} | — | March 19, 2009 | Kitt Peak | Spacewatch | · | 600 m | MPC · JPL |
| 853481 | 2009 HU_{86} | — | April 30, 2009 | Mount Lemmon | Mount Lemmon Survey | · | 1.6 km | MPC · JPL |
| 853482 | 2009 HK_{91} | — | March 23, 2009 | Kitt Peak | Spacewatch | · | 1.2 km | MPC · JPL |
| 853483 | 2009 HP_{91} | — | April 19, 2009 | Mount Lemmon | Mount Lemmon Survey | · | 1.3 km | MPC · JPL |
| 853484 | 2009 HB_{93} | — | March 19, 2009 | Kitt Peak | Spacewatch | · | 650 m | MPC · JPL |
| 853485 | 2009 HU_{102} | — | April 30, 2009 | Kitt Peak | Spacewatch | · | 970 m | MPC · JPL |
| 853486 | 2009 HJ_{104} | — | April 24, 2009 | Kitt Peak | Spacewatch | · | 1.4 km | MPC · JPL |
| 853487 | 2009 HW_{111} | — | April 30, 2009 | Mount Lemmon | Mount Lemmon Survey | H | 490 m | MPC · JPL |
| 853488 | 2009 HN_{113} | — | March 14, 2016 | Mount Lemmon | Mount Lemmon Survey | · | 750 m | MPC · JPL |
| 853489 | 2009 HY_{113} | — | April 27, 2009 | Mount Lemmon | Mount Lemmon Survey | · | 1.3 km | MPC · JPL |
| 853490 | 2009 HM_{114} | — | September 11, 2010 | Mount Lemmon | Mount Lemmon Survey | H | 400 m | MPC · JPL |
| 853491 | 2009 HR_{114} | — | October 24, 2011 | Mount Lemmon | Mount Lemmon Survey | · | 1.5 km | MPC · JPL |
| 853492 | 2009 HZ_{114} | — | July 13, 2013 | Haleakala | Pan-STARRS 1 | · | 600 m | MPC · JPL |
| 853493 | 2009 HK_{115} | — | April 30, 2009 | Kitt Peak | Spacewatch | · | 610 m | MPC · JPL |
| 853494 | 2009 HQ_{115} | — | January 21, 2012 | Kitt Peak | Spacewatch | · | 400 m | MPC · JPL |
| 853495 | 2009 HW_{115} | — | April 22, 2009 | Mount Lemmon | Mount Lemmon Survey | · | 480 m | MPC · JPL |
| 853496 | 2009 HH_{117} | — | April 18, 2009 | Mount Lemmon | Mount Lemmon Survey | · | 960 m | MPC · JPL |
| 853497 | 2009 HR_{117} | — | January 20, 2015 | Haleakala | Pan-STARRS 1 | · | 410 m | MPC · JPL |
| 853498 | 2009 HD_{118} | — | January 26, 2012 | Haleakala | Pan-STARRS 1 | · | 520 m | MPC · JPL |
| 853499 | 2009 HH_{118} | — | November 8, 2010 | Mount Lemmon | Mount Lemmon Survey | PHO | 670 m | MPC · JPL |
| 853500 | 2009 HP_{118} | — | December 8, 2017 | Haleakala | Pan-STARRS 1 | · | 450 m | MPC · JPL |

== 853501–853600 ==
back to top

| Designation | | | Discovery | | | Properties | | Ref |
| Permanent | Provisional | Named after | Date | Site | Discoverer(s) | Category | Diam. | Ref |
|---|---|---|---|---|---|---|---|---|
| 853501 | 2009 HL_{119} | — | April 4, 2014 | Haleakala | Pan-STARRS 1 | · | 1.4 km | MPC · JPL |
| 853502 | 2009 HM_{119} | — | August 22, 2014 | Haleakala | Pan-STARRS 1 | · | 950 m | MPC · JPL |
| 853503 | 2009 HZ_{119} | — | October 9, 2015 | Haleakala | Pan-STARRS 1 | · | 1.6 km | MPC · JPL |
| 853504 | 2009 HQ_{120} | — | December 21, 2014 | Haleakala | Pan-STARRS 1 | · | 410 m | MPC · JPL |
| 853505 | 2009 HJ_{122} | — | April 22, 2009 | Mount Lemmon | Mount Lemmon Survey | · | 950 m | MPC · JPL |
| 853506 | 2009 HU_{122} | — | April 22, 2009 | Mount Lemmon | Mount Lemmon Survey | · | 530 m | MPC · JPL |
| 853507 | 2009 HC_{123} | — | April 22, 2009 | Mount Lemmon | Mount Lemmon Survey | MAS | 440 m | MPC · JPL |
| 853508 | 2009 HV_{123} | — | April 22, 2009 | Mount Lemmon | Mount Lemmon Survey | · | 1.1 km | MPC · JPL |
| 853509 | 2009 HG_{125} | — | April 22, 2009 | Mount Lemmon | Mount Lemmon Survey | · | 1.5 km | MPC · JPL |
| 853510 | 2009 HQ_{125} | — | April 22, 2009 | Mount Lemmon | Mount Lemmon Survey | · | 2.0 km | MPC · JPL |
| 853511 | 2009 HX_{125} | — | April 20, 2009 | Kitt Peak | Spacewatch | · | 1.3 km | MPC · JPL |
| 853512 | 2009 HH_{126} | — | April 19, 2009 | Mount Lemmon | Mount Lemmon Survey | V | 410 m | MPC · JPL |
| 853513 | 2009 HU_{126} | — | April 22, 2009 | Kitt Peak | Spacewatch | · | 1.1 km | MPC · JPL |
| 853514 | 2009 HX_{126} | — | April 22, 2009 | Mount Lemmon | Mount Lemmon Survey | PHO | 650 m | MPC · JPL |
| 853515 | 2009 HD_{127} | — | April 20, 2009 | Mount Lemmon | Mount Lemmon Survey | · | 570 m | MPC · JPL |
| 853516 | 2009 HE_{128} | — | April 22, 2009 | Mount Lemmon | Mount Lemmon Survey | · | 1.2 km | MPC · JPL |
| 853517 | 2009 HF_{128} | — | April 18, 2009 | Kitt Peak | Spacewatch | · | 1.2 km | MPC · JPL |
| 853518 | 2009 HJ_{129} | — | April 18, 2009 | Mount Lemmon | Mount Lemmon Survey | MAS | 470 m | MPC · JPL |
| 853519 | 2009 JC_{3} | — | November 2, 2007 | Mount Lemmon | Mount Lemmon Survey | H | 310 m | MPC · JPL |
| 853520 | 2009 JA_{5} | — | May 13, 2009 | Kitt Peak | Spacewatch | L5 | 6.8 km | MPC · JPL |
| 853521 | 2009 JH_{9} | — | May 14, 2009 | Kitt Peak | Spacewatch | · | 840 m | MPC · JPL |
| 853522 | 2009 JH_{11} | — | May 15, 2009 | Kitt Peak | Spacewatch | GAL | 1.2 km | MPC · JPL |
| 853523 | 2009 JM_{20} | — | August 1, 2016 | Haleakala | Pan-STARRS 1 | · | 2.5 km | MPC · JPL |
| 853524 | 2009 JA_{21} | — | July 6, 2016 | Haleakala | Pan-STARRS 1 | · | 450 m | MPC · JPL |
| 853525 | 2009 JF_{21} | — | February 17, 2013 | Kitt Peak | Spacewatch | · | 1.4 km | MPC · JPL |
| 853526 | 2009 JK_{21} | — | May 13, 2009 | Kitt Peak | Spacewatch | · | 600 m | MPC · JPL |
| 853527 | 2009 JG_{22} | — | May 1, 2009 | Kitt Peak | Spacewatch | · | 730 m | MPC · JPL |
| 853528 | 2009 JM_{22} | — | May 1, 2009 | Mount Lemmon | Mount Lemmon Survey | · | 430 m | MPC · JPL |
| 853529 | 2009 JQ_{22} | — | April 29, 2009 | Kitt Peak | Spacewatch | NYS | 780 m | MPC · JPL |
| 853530 | 2009 JN_{23} | — | May 1, 2009 | Kitt Peak | Spacewatch | · | 410 m | MPC · JPL |
| 853531 | 2009 KE_{3} | — | May 23, 2009 | Siding Spring | SSS | T_{j} (2.96) · APO · PHA | 770 m | MPC · JPL |
| 853532 | 2009 KP_{4} | — | May 23, 2009 | Catalina | CSS | · | 1.1 km | MPC · JPL |
| 853533 | 2009 KS_{17} | — | May 26, 2009 | Kitt Peak | Spacewatch | EUN | 1.1 km | MPC · JPL |
| 853534 | 2009 KY_{17} | — | May 26, 2009 | Kitt Peak | Spacewatch | H | 390 m | MPC · JPL |
| 853535 | 2009 KA_{24} | — | May 27, 2009 | Kitt Peak | Spacewatch | · | 1.4 km | MPC · JPL |
| 853536 | 2009 KQ_{28} | — | May 16, 2009 | Mount Lemmon | Mount Lemmon Survey | · | 510 m | MPC · JPL |
| 853537 | 2009 KP_{38} | — | May 17, 2009 | Kitt Peak | Spacewatch | · | 530 m | MPC · JPL |
| 853538 | 2009 KP_{39} | — | November 17, 2015 | Haleakala | Pan-STARRS 1 | EUN | 880 m | MPC · JPL |
| 853539 | 2009 KT_{40} | — | October 17, 2010 | Mount Lemmon | Mount Lemmon Survey | · | 1.2 km | MPC · JPL |
| 853540 | 2009 KZ_{40} | — | October 12, 2016 | Haleakala | Pan-STARRS 1 | · | 480 m | MPC · JPL |
| 853541 | 2009 KF_{41} | — | April 29, 2014 | Haleakala | Pan-STARRS 1 | · | 1.3 km | MPC · JPL |
| 853542 | 2009 KH_{41} | — | November 8, 2010 | Mount Lemmon | Mount Lemmon Survey | · | 1.1 km | MPC · JPL |
| 853543 | 2009 KL_{41} | — | May 18, 2009 | Mount Lemmon | Mount Lemmon Survey | 526 | 1.4 km | MPC · JPL |
| 853544 | 2009 KH_{42} | — | October 13, 2013 | Mount Lemmon | Mount Lemmon Survey | · | 410 m | MPC · JPL |
| 853545 | 2009 KF_{44} | — | May 17, 2009 | Kitt Peak | Spacewatch | · | 1.2 km | MPC · JPL |
| 853546 | 2009 KV_{44} | — | April 22, 2009 | Mount Lemmon | Mount Lemmon Survey | · | 890 m | MPC · JPL |
| 853547 | 2009 LJ_{2} | — | June 14, 2009 | Mount Lemmon | Mount Lemmon Survey | · | 760 m | MPC · JPL |
| 853548 | 2009 LO_{7} | — | July 13, 2013 | Haleakala | Pan-STARRS 1 | · | 1 km | MPC · JPL |
| 853549 | 2009 MW_{1} | — | June 16, 2009 | Mount Lemmon | Mount Lemmon Survey | PHO | 730 m | MPC · JPL |
| 853550 | 2009 ME_{2} | — | June 17, 2009 | Kitt Peak | Spacewatch | · | 1.9 km | MPC · JPL |
| 853551 | 2009 MC_{8} | — | June 24, 2009 | Mount Lemmon | Mount Lemmon Survey | T_{j} (2.98) | 3.5 km | MPC · JPL |
| 853552 | 2009 MK_{11} | — | May 23, 2014 | Haleakala | Pan-STARRS 1 | H | 350 m | MPC · JPL |
| 853553 | 2009 OD_{20} | — | November 2, 2005 | Catalina | CSS | JUN | 840 m | MPC · JPL |
| 853554 | 2009 OG_{20} | — | July 30, 2009 | Catalina | CSS | · | 1.4 km | MPC · JPL |
| 853555 | 2009 OC_{27} | — | August 28, 2016 | Mount Lemmon | Mount Lemmon Survey | · | 470 m | MPC · JPL |
| 853556 | 2009 OR_{27} | — | July 31, 2009 | Kitt Peak | Spacewatch | · | 470 m | MPC · JPL |
| 853557 | 2009 OS_{28} | — | July 29, 2009 | Catalina | CSS | · | 630 m | MPC · JPL |
| 853558 | 2009 OK_{29} | — | July 27, 2009 | Catalina | CSS | · | 1.4 km | MPC · JPL |
| 853559 | 2009 OF_{30} | — | July 31, 2009 | Kitt Peak | Spacewatch | · | 1.7 km | MPC · JPL |
| 853560 | 2009 PZ_{1} | — | August 15, 2009 | Altschwendt | W. Ries | DOR | 1.7 km | MPC · JPL |
| 853561 | 2009 PW_{6} | — | August 10, 2009 | Kitt Peak | Spacewatch | · | 2.2 km | MPC · JPL |
| 853562 | 2009 PX_{11} | — | October 25, 2005 | Kitt Peak | Spacewatch | · | 1.2 km | MPC · JPL |
| 853563 | 2009 PW_{22} | — | August 14, 2017 | Haleakala | Pan-STARRS 1 | H | 410 m | MPC · JPL |
| 853564 | 2009 PG_{24} | — | August 15, 2009 | Kitt Peak | Spacewatch | · | 1.5 km | MPC · JPL |
| 853565 | 2009 QV | — | September 10, 2004 | Kitt Peak | Spacewatch | H | 480 m | MPC · JPL |
| 853566 | 2009 QC_{1} | — | August 16, 2009 | La Sagra | OAM | · | 1.2 km | MPC · JPL |
| 853567 | 2009 QC_{7} | — | August 19, 2009 | Catalina | CSS | · | 1.0 km | MPC · JPL |
| 853568 | 2009 QB_{16} | — | August 16, 2009 | Kitt Peak | Spacewatch | · | 490 m | MPC · JPL |
| 853569 | 2009 QU_{17} | — | August 17, 2009 | Kitt Peak | Spacewatch | · | 1.4 km | MPC · JPL |
| 853570 | 2009 QV_{19} | — | August 19, 2009 | La Sagra | OAM | T_{j} (2.86) | 2.2 km | MPC · JPL |
| 853571 | 2009 QK_{22} | — | August 20, 2009 | La Sagra | OAM | · | 940 m | MPC · JPL |
| 853572 | 2009 QU_{23} | — | July 28, 2009 | Kitt Peak | Spacewatch | · | 1.1 km | MPC · JPL |
| 853573 | 2009 QS_{24} | — | August 16, 2009 | Kitt Peak | Spacewatch | · | 2.5 km | MPC · JPL |
| 853574 | 2009 QA_{25} | — | August 19, 2009 | Kitt Peak | Spacewatch | · | 680 m | MPC · JPL |
| 853575 | 2009 QQ_{29} | — | August 23, 2009 | Bergisch Gladbach | W. Bickel | (2076) | 560 m | MPC · JPL |
| 853576 | 2009 QW_{36} | — | August 30, 2009 | Altschwendt | W. Ries | · | 1.1 km | MPC · JPL |
| 853577 | 2009 QA_{37} | — | September 29, 2005 | Kitt Peak | Spacewatch | · | 890 m | MPC · JPL |
| 853578 | 2009 QC_{44} | — | August 27, 2009 | Kitt Peak | Spacewatch | · | 570 m | MPC · JPL |
| 853579 | 2009 QV_{55} | — | August 27, 2009 | Kitt Peak | Spacewatch | 3:2 | 3.7 km | MPC · JPL |
| 853580 | 2009 QN_{56} | — | August 16, 2009 | Kitt Peak | Spacewatch | · | 840 m | MPC · JPL |
| 853581 | 2009 QJ_{64} | — | August 26, 2009 | Catalina | CSS | · | 1.4 km | MPC · JPL |
| 853582 | 2009 QR_{66} | — | August 17, 2009 | Siding Spring | SSS | · | 580 m | MPC · JPL |
| 853583 | 2009 QN_{68} | — | August 18, 2009 | Kitt Peak | Spacewatch | EOS | 1.4 km | MPC · JPL |
| 853584 | 2009 QY_{68} | — | August 27, 2009 | Kitt Peak | Spacewatch | · | 830 m | MPC · JPL |
| 853585 | 2009 QJ_{70} | — | August 18, 2009 | Kitt Peak | Spacewatch | · | 690 m | MPC · JPL |
| 853586 | 2009 QL_{70} | — | August 27, 2009 | Kitt Peak | Spacewatch | · | 640 m | MPC · JPL |
| 853587 | 2009 QM_{70} | — | July 12, 2016 | Haleakala | Pan-STARRS 1 | · | 700 m | MPC · JPL |
| 853588 | 2009 QN_{70} | — | August 28, 2009 | Kitt Peak | Spacewatch | · | 1.3 km | MPC · JPL |
| 853589 | 2009 QS_{70} | — | August 29, 2009 | Kitt Peak | Spacewatch | · | 490 m | MPC · JPL |
| 853590 | 2009 QX_{71} | — | August 28, 2009 | Kitt Peak | Spacewatch | · | 470 m | MPC · JPL |
| 853591 | 2009 QX_{72} | — | August 30, 2009 | Bergisch Gladbach | W. Bickel | · | 2.2 km | MPC · JPL |
| 853592 | 2009 QZ_{72} | — | August 16, 2009 | Kitt Peak | Spacewatch | · | 1.8 km | MPC · JPL |
| 853593 | 2009 QL_{74} | — | August 29, 2009 | Kitt Peak | Spacewatch | · | 1.5 km | MPC · JPL |
| 853594 | 2009 QV_{74} | — | August 27, 2009 | Kitt Peak | Spacewatch | · | 2.1 km | MPC · JPL |
| 853595 | 2009 QN_{75} | — | August 16, 2009 | Kitt Peak | Spacewatch | NYS | 740 m | MPC · JPL |
| 853596 | 2009 QZ_{75} | — | August 28, 2009 | Kitt Peak | Spacewatch | · | 2.0 km | MPC · JPL |
| 853597 | 2009 QJ_{76} | — | August 28, 2009 | Kitt Peak | Spacewatch | · | 1.6 km | MPC · JPL |
| 853598 | 2009 QT_{76} | — | August 28, 2009 | Kitt Peak | Spacewatch | THM | 1.5 km | MPC · JPL |
| 853599 | 2009 QK_{77} | — | August 18, 2009 | Bergisch Gladbach | W. Bickel | · | 1.4 km | MPC · JPL |
| 853600 | 2009 QD_{78} | — | August 16, 2009 | Kitt Peak | Spacewatch | · | 560 m | MPC · JPL |

== 853601–853700 ==
back to top

| Designation | | | Discovery | | | Properties | | Ref |
| Permanent | Provisional | Named after | Date | Site | Discoverer(s) | Category | Diam. | Ref |
|---|---|---|---|---|---|---|---|---|
| 853601 | 2009 QJ_{78} | — | August 16, 2009 | Kitt Peak | Spacewatch | · | 1.6 km | MPC · JPL |
| 853602 | 2009 QO_{78} | — | August 16, 2009 | Kitt Peak | Spacewatch | · | 530 m | MPC · JPL |
| 853603 | 2009 QQ_{78} | — | August 29, 2009 | Kitt Peak | Spacewatch | · | 470 m | MPC · JPL |
| 853604 | 2009 QC_{81} | — | August 27, 2009 | Kitt Peak | Spacewatch | · | 430 m | MPC · JPL |
| 853605 | 2009 QG_{81} | — | August 18, 2009 | Kitt Peak | Spacewatch | · | 440 m | MPC · JPL |
| 853606 | 2009 QS_{83} | — | August 20, 2009 | Kitt Peak | Spacewatch | · | 1.6 km | MPC · JPL |
| 853607 | 2009 RX_{1} | — | August 17, 2009 | Kitt Peak | Spacewatch | · | 690 m | MPC · JPL |
| 853608 | 2009 RS_{8} | — | September 12, 2009 | Kitt Peak | Spacewatch | 3:2 | 3.4 km | MPC · JPL |
| 853609 | 2009 RC_{12} | — | September 12, 2009 | Kitt Peak | Spacewatch | · | 460 m | MPC · JPL |
| 853610 | 2009 RS_{13} | — | September 12, 2009 | Kitt Peak | Spacewatch | · | 560 m | MPC · JPL |
| 853611 | 2009 RA_{16} | — | September 12, 2009 | Kitt Peak | Spacewatch | · | 1 km | MPC · JPL |
| 853612 | 2009 RR_{16} | — | September 12, 2009 | Kitt Peak | Spacewatch | · | 1.0 km | MPC · JPL |
| 853613 | 2009 RT_{19} | — | September 14, 2009 | Catalina | CSS | · | 900 m | MPC · JPL |
| 853614 | 2009 RW_{22} | — | September 15, 2009 | Mount Lemmon | Mount Lemmon Survey | EOS | 1.1 km | MPC · JPL |
| 853615 | 2009 RT_{24} | — | September 15, 2009 | Kitt Peak | Spacewatch | · | 1.5 km | MPC · JPL |
| 853616 | 2009 RZ_{27} | — | September 16, 2009 | Kitt Peak | Spacewatch | · | 1.2 km | MPC · JPL |
| 853617 | 2009 RT_{30} | — | September 14, 2009 | Kitt Peak | Spacewatch | · | 1.7 km | MPC · JPL |
| 853618 | 2009 RO_{37} | — | September 15, 2009 | Kitt Peak | Spacewatch | · | 1.2 km | MPC · JPL |
| 853619 | 2009 RM_{38} | — | September 15, 2009 | Kitt Peak | Spacewatch | · | 860 m | MPC · JPL |
| 853620 | 2009 RR_{40} | — | September 15, 2009 | Kitt Peak | Spacewatch | · | 1.1 km | MPC · JPL |
| 853621 | 2009 RS_{40} | — | September 15, 2009 | Kitt Peak | Spacewatch | · | 1.7 km | MPC · JPL |
| 853622 | 2009 RZ_{40} | — | September 15, 2009 | Kitt Peak | Spacewatch | MAR | 750 m | MPC · JPL |
| 853623 | 2009 RA_{45} | — | September 15, 2009 | Kitt Peak | Spacewatch | · | 690 m | MPC · JPL |
| 853624 | 2009 RQ_{45} | — | September 15, 2009 | Kitt Peak | Spacewatch | · | 720 m | MPC · JPL |
| 853625 | 2009 RT_{51} | — | September 15, 2009 | Kitt Peak | Spacewatch | · | 810 m | MPC · JPL |
| 853626 | 2009 RM_{67} | — | September 15, 2009 | Kitt Peak | Spacewatch | · | 1.4 km | MPC · JPL |
| 853627 | 2009 RH_{72} | — | September 12, 2009 | Kitt Peak | Spacewatch | · | 1.4 km | MPC · JPL |
| 853628 | 2009 RW_{73} | — | September 15, 2009 | Kitt Peak | Spacewatch | EOS | 1.3 km | MPC · JPL |
| 853629 | 2009 RZ_{76} | — | September 15, 2009 | Kitt Peak | Spacewatch | · | 530 m | MPC · JPL |
| 853630 | 2009 RA_{77} | — | September 15, 2009 | Kitt Peak | Spacewatch | · | 620 m | MPC · JPL |
| 853631 | 2009 RB_{77} | — | September 15, 2009 | Kitt Peak | Spacewatch | · | 810 m | MPC · JPL |
| 853632 | 2009 RN_{79} | — | September 15, 2009 | Kitt Peak | Spacewatch | · | 1.2 km | MPC · JPL |
| 853633 | 2009 RV_{79} | — | September 15, 2009 | Kitt Peak | Spacewatch | · | 530 m | MPC · JPL |
| 853634 | 2009 RP_{80} | — | September 12, 2009 | Kitt Peak | Spacewatch | · | 1.1 km | MPC · JPL |
| 853635 | 2009 RB_{83} | — | September 14, 2009 | Needville | Observatory, George | · | 470 m | MPC · JPL |
| 853636 | 2009 RB_{84} | — | September 15, 2009 | Kitt Peak | Spacewatch | · | 400 m | MPC · JPL |
| 853637 | 2009 RP_{84} | — | September 15, 2009 | Kitt Peak | Spacewatch | · | 1.8 km | MPC · JPL |
| 853638 | 2009 SY_{2} | — | October 11, 2005 | Kitt Peak | Spacewatch | · | 850 m | MPC · JPL |
| 853639 | 2009 SG_{3} | — | August 17, 2009 | Kitt Peak | Spacewatch | · | 1.5 km | MPC · JPL |
| 853640 | 2009 SA_{4} | — | September 16, 2009 | Mount Lemmon | Mount Lemmon Survey | V | 400 m | MPC · JPL |
| 853641 | 2009 SK_{4} | — | August 18, 2009 | Kitt Peak | Spacewatch | · | 1.1 km | MPC · JPL |
| 853642 | 2009 SL_{4} | — | September 16, 2009 | Mount Lemmon | Mount Lemmon Survey | VER | 1.9 km | MPC · JPL |
| 853643 | 2009 SX_{7} | — | September 16, 2009 | Mount Lemmon | Mount Lemmon Survey | EOS | 1.4 km | MPC · JPL |
| 853644 | 2009 SA_{8} | — | September 16, 2009 | Mount Lemmon | Mount Lemmon Survey | · | 460 m | MPC · JPL |
| 853645 | 2009 SQ_{9} | — | September 16, 2009 | Kitt Peak | Spacewatch | · | 1.5 km | MPC · JPL |
| 853646 | 2009 SH_{10} | — | September 16, 2009 | Mount Lemmon | Mount Lemmon Survey | · | 690 m | MPC · JPL |
| 853647 | 2009 SO_{14} | — | September 16, 2009 | Kitt Peak | Spacewatch | · | 800 m | MPC · JPL |
| 853648 | 2009 SH_{23} | — | July 30, 2009 | Kitt Peak | Spacewatch | · | 750 m | MPC · JPL |
| 853649 | 2009 SQ_{23} | — | August 27, 2009 | Kitt Peak | Spacewatch | NYS | 710 m | MPC · JPL |
| 853650 | 2009 SD_{24} | — | September 16, 2009 | Kitt Peak | Spacewatch | · | 840 m | MPC · JPL |
| 853651 | 2009 SG_{26} | — | September 16, 2009 | Kitt Peak | Spacewatch | · | 760 m | MPC · JPL |
| 853652 | 2009 SS_{27} | — | September 16, 2009 | Kitt Peak | Spacewatch | THM | 1.4 km | MPC · JPL |
| 853653 | 2009 SJ_{29} | — | September 16, 2009 | Kitt Peak | Spacewatch | · | 1.4 km | MPC · JPL |
| 853654 | 2009 SX_{30} | — | September 16, 2009 | Kitt Peak | Spacewatch | · | 750 m | MPC · JPL |
| 853655 | 2009 SN_{33} | — | September 16, 2009 | Kitt Peak | Spacewatch | · | 400 m | MPC · JPL |
| 853656 | 2009 SF_{38} | — | September 16, 2009 | Kitt Peak | Spacewatch | · | 1.6 km | MPC · JPL |
| 853657 | 2009 SY_{44} | — | September 16, 2009 | Mount Lemmon | Mount Lemmon Survey | · | 570 m | MPC · JPL |
| 853658 | 2009 SJ_{45} | — | September 16, 2009 | Kitt Peak | Spacewatch | · | 1.6 km | MPC · JPL |
| 853659 | 2009 SD_{46} | — | September 16, 2009 | Kitt Peak | Spacewatch | · | 1.3 km | MPC · JPL |
| 853660 | 2009 SY_{48} | — | September 16, 2009 | Mount Lemmon | Mount Lemmon Survey | · | 1.2 km | MPC · JPL |
| 853661 | 2009 SZ_{49} | — | August 27, 2009 | Kitt Peak | Spacewatch | NYS | 820 m | MPC · JPL |
| 853662 | 2009 SE_{52} | — | November 9, 1993 | Kitt Peak | Spacewatch | · | 440 m | MPC · JPL |
| 853663 | 2009 SQ_{56} | — | September 17, 2009 | Kitt Peak | Spacewatch | · | 2.0 km | MPC · JPL |
| 853664 | 2009 SS_{56} | — | September 17, 2009 | Kitt Peak | Spacewatch | · | 480 m | MPC · JPL |
| 853665 | 2009 ST_{57} | — | September 17, 2009 | Kitt Peak | Spacewatch | · | 730 m | MPC · JPL |
| 853666 | 2009 SB_{66} | — | September 17, 2009 | Kitt Peak | Spacewatch | · | 1.9 km | MPC · JPL |
| 853667 | 2009 SU_{66} | — | September 17, 2009 | Kitt Peak | Spacewatch | · | 410 m | MPC · JPL |
| 853668 | 2009 SJ_{68} | — | September 17, 2009 | Mount Lemmon | Mount Lemmon Survey | · | 730 m | MPC · JPL |
| 853669 | 2009 SS_{69} | — | September 17, 2009 | Mount Lemmon | Mount Lemmon Survey | · | 1.2 km | MPC · JPL |
| 853670 | 2009 SX_{71} | — | September 17, 2009 | Mount Lemmon | Mount Lemmon Survey | · | 1.5 km | MPC · JPL |
| 853671 | 2009 SF_{74} | — | September 17, 2009 | Kitt Peak | Spacewatch | EUP | 2.9 km | MPC · JPL |
| 853672 | 2009 ST_{76} | — | September 17, 2009 | Kitt Peak | Spacewatch | · | 860 m | MPC · JPL |
| 853673 | 2009 SA_{84} | — | October 29, 2006 | Kitt Peak | Spacewatch | · | 390 m | MPC · JPL |
| 853674 | 2009 SZ_{85} | — | August 27, 2009 | Kitt Peak | Spacewatch | · | 1.4 km | MPC · JPL |
| 853675 | 2009 SR_{86} | — | October 1, 2005 | Mount Lemmon | Mount Lemmon Survey | · | 860 m | MPC · JPL |
| 853676 | 2009 ST_{94} | — | September 19, 2009 | Mount Lemmon | Mount Lemmon Survey | MAS | 490 m | MPC · JPL |
| 853677 | 2009 SM_{95} | — | October 1, 2005 | Mount Lemmon | Mount Lemmon Survey | MIS | 2.1 km | MPC · JPL |
| 853678 | 2009 SP_{95} | — | September 19, 2009 | Mount Lemmon | Mount Lemmon Survey | EOS | 1.4 km | MPC · JPL |
| 853679 | 2009 SU_{98} | — | August 16, 2009 | Catalina | CSS | · | 1.4 km | MPC · JPL |
| 853680 | 2009 SF_{101} | — | September 17, 2009 | Zelenchukskaya | T. V. Krjačko, B. Satovski | · | 1.7 km | MPC · JPL |
| 853681 | 2009 SX_{102} | — | September 24, 2009 | La Sagra | OAM | H | 350 m | MPC · JPL |
| 853682 | 2009 SH_{105} | — | September 16, 2009 | Mount Lemmon | Mount Lemmon Survey | EOS | 1.4 km | MPC · JPL |
| 853683 | 2009 SX_{107} | — | September 16, 2009 | Mount Lemmon | Mount Lemmon Survey | · | 2.0 km | MPC · JPL |
| 853684 | 2009 SK_{110} | — | September 17, 2009 | Kitt Peak | Spacewatch | H | 370 m | MPC · JPL |
| 853685 | 2009 SY_{115} | — | August 27, 2009 | Kitt Peak | Spacewatch | NYS | 820 m | MPC · JPL |
| 853686 | 2009 SO_{116} | — | September 18, 2009 | Kitt Peak | Spacewatch | · | 1.6 km | MPC · JPL |
| 853687 | 2009 SB_{117} | — | September 18, 2009 | Kitt Peak | Spacewatch | EOS | 1.2 km | MPC · JPL |
| 853688 | 2009 SL_{117} | — | September 18, 2009 | Kitt Peak | Spacewatch | · | 2.4 km | MPC · JPL |
| 853689 | 2009 SG_{118} | — | September 18, 2009 | Kitt Peak | Spacewatch | · | 1.7 km | MPC · JPL |
| 853690 | 2009 SL_{121} | — | September 18, 2009 | Kitt Peak | Spacewatch | · | 1.2 km | MPC · JPL |
| 853691 | 2009 SS_{121} | — | September 18, 2009 | Kitt Peak | Spacewatch | NYS | 690 m | MPC · JPL |
| 853692 | 2009 SC_{122} | — | September 18, 2009 | Kitt Peak | Spacewatch | · | 1.9 km | MPC · JPL |
| 853693 | 2009 SF_{124} | — | September 18, 2009 | Kitt Peak | Spacewatch | EOS | 1.3 km | MPC · JPL |
| 853694 | 2009 SW_{124} | — | September 18, 2009 | Kitt Peak | Spacewatch | · | 550 m | MPC · JPL |
| 853695 | 2009 SO_{127} | — | September 18, 2009 | Kitt Peak | Spacewatch | · | 1.4 km | MPC · JPL |
| 853696 | 2009 SG_{128} | — | September 18, 2009 | Kitt Peak | Spacewatch | · | 1.7 km | MPC · JPL |
| 853697 | 2009 SR_{129} | — | September 18, 2009 | Kitt Peak | Spacewatch | 3:2 | 4.0 km | MPC · JPL |
| 853698 | 2009 SX_{129} | — | September 18, 2009 | Kitt Peak | Spacewatch | · | 760 m | MPC · JPL |
| 853699 | 2009 SZ_{132} | — | September 18, 2009 | Kitt Peak | Spacewatch | · | 470 m | MPC · JPL |
| 853700 | 2009 SL_{139} | — | September 19, 2009 | Kitt Peak | Spacewatch | · | 2.1 km | MPC · JPL |

== 853701–853800 ==
back to top

| Designation | | | Discovery | | | Properties | | Ref |
| Permanent | Provisional | Named after | Date | Site | Discoverer(s) | Category | Diam. | Ref |
|---|---|---|---|---|---|---|---|---|
| 853701 | 2009 SU_{139} | — | September 19, 2009 | Kitt Peak | Spacewatch | · | 610 m | MPC · JPL |
| 853702 | 2009 SK_{144} | — | September 19, 2009 | Mount Lemmon | Mount Lemmon Survey | · | 560 m | MPC · JPL |
| 853703 | 2009 SD_{146} | — | September 19, 2009 | Mount Lemmon | Mount Lemmon Survey | · | 430 m | MPC · JPL |
| 853704 | 2009 SZ_{149} | — | September 20, 2009 | Kitt Peak | Spacewatch | T_{j} (2.97) · 3:2 | 3.8 km | MPC · JPL |
| 853705 | 2009 SH_{155} | — | September 20, 2009 | Mount Lemmon | Mount Lemmon Survey | · | 540 m | MPC · JPL |
| 853706 | 2009 SR_{158} | — | September 20, 2009 | Kitt Peak | Spacewatch | · | 570 m | MPC · JPL |
| 853707 | 2009 SF_{160} | — | September 20, 2009 | Kitt Peak | Spacewatch | V | 460 m | MPC · JPL |
| 853708 | 2009 SU_{164} | — | September 21, 2009 | Kitt Peak | Spacewatch | · | 1.7 km | MPC · JPL |
| 853709 | 2009 SD_{167} | — | September 12, 2009 | Kitt Peak | Spacewatch | DOR | 1.8 km | MPC · JPL |
| 853710 | 2009 SY_{171} | — | September 27, 2009 | Rodeo | Cullen, S. | EOS | 1.4 km | MPC · JPL |
| 853711 | 2009 SN_{174} | — | September 18, 2009 | Mount Lemmon | Mount Lemmon Survey | EOS | 1.3 km | MPC · JPL |
| 853712 | 2009 SQ_{175} | — | September 19, 2009 | Catalina | CSS | · | 580 m | MPC · JPL |
| 853713 | 2009 SA_{179} | — | September 20, 2009 | Mount Lemmon | Mount Lemmon Survey | · | 1.5 km | MPC · JPL |
| 853714 | 2009 SE_{179} | — | September 20, 2009 | Mount Lemmon | Mount Lemmon Survey | · | 1.5 km | MPC · JPL |
| 853715 | 2009 SG_{181} | — | September 21, 2009 | Mount Lemmon | Mount Lemmon Survey | · | 1.5 km | MPC · JPL |
| 853716 | 2009 SN_{184} | — | September 21, 2009 | Kitt Peak | Spacewatch | · | 550 m | MPC · JPL |
| 853717 | 2009 SP_{187} | — | September 21, 2009 | Kitt Peak | Spacewatch | · | 1.5 km | MPC · JPL |
| 853718 | 2009 SH_{189} | — | September 22, 2009 | Kitt Peak | Spacewatch | · | 2.0 km | MPC · JPL |
| 853719 | 2009 SJ_{190} | — | September 22, 2009 | Kitt Peak | Spacewatch | · | 2.1 km | MPC · JPL |
| 853720 | 2009 SR_{192} | — | September 14, 2009 | Kitt Peak | Spacewatch | T_{j} (2.99) · 3:2 | 3.4 km | MPC · JPL |
| 853721 | 2009 ST_{192} | — | September 14, 2009 | Kitt Peak | Spacewatch | · | 1.3 km | MPC · JPL |
| 853722 | 2009 SN_{194} | — | September 18, 2009 | Kitt Peak | Spacewatch | NYS | 780 m | MPC · JPL |
| 853723 | 2009 SW_{194} | — | September 22, 2009 | Kitt Peak | Spacewatch | · | 640 m | MPC · JPL |
| 853724 | 2009 SD_{195} | — | September 22, 2009 | Kitt Peak | Spacewatch | (7744) | 1.1 km | MPC · JPL |
| 853725 | 2009 SB_{197} | — | September 18, 2009 | Kitt Peak | Spacewatch | · | 1.8 km | MPC · JPL |
| 853726 | 2009 SN_{198} | — | September 22, 2009 | Kitt Peak | Spacewatch | · | 420 m | MPC · JPL |
| 853727 | 2009 SB_{199} | — | September 22, 2009 | Kitt Peak | Spacewatch | · | 1.4 km | MPC · JPL |
| 853728 | 2009 SS_{199} | — | September 22, 2009 | Kitt Peak | Spacewatch | · | 430 m | MPC · JPL |
| 853729 | 2009 SG_{200} | — | September 22, 2009 | Kitt Peak | Spacewatch | · | 1.6 km | MPC · JPL |
| 853730 | 2009 SD_{201} | — | September 22, 2009 | Kitt Peak | Spacewatch | · | 1.6 km | MPC · JPL |
| 853731 | 2009 SU_{203} | — | September 22, 2009 | Kitt Peak | Spacewatch | EOS | 1.3 km | MPC · JPL |
| 853732 | 2009 SO_{205} | — | September 22, 2009 | Kitt Peak | Spacewatch | NYS | 800 m | MPC · JPL |
| 853733 | 2009 SP_{205} | — | September 22, 2009 | Kitt Peak | Spacewatch | · | 400 m | MPC · JPL |
| 853734 | 2009 SB_{210} | — | September 23, 2009 | Kitt Peak | Spacewatch | · | 1.8 km | MPC · JPL |
| 853735 | 2009 SJ_{219} | — | September 24, 2009 | Mount Lemmon | Mount Lemmon Survey | · | 1.6 km | MPC · JPL |
| 853736 | 2009 SE_{220} | — | September 24, 2009 | Mount Lemmon | Mount Lemmon Survey | · | 1.7 km | MPC · JPL |
| 853737 | 2009 SY_{221} | — | August 29, 2009 | Kitt Peak | Spacewatch | · | 520 m | MPC · JPL |
| 853738 | 2009 SR_{222} | — | September 25, 2009 | Mount Lemmon | Mount Lemmon Survey | · | 550 m | MPC · JPL |
| 853739 | 2009 SJ_{223} | — | September 25, 2009 | Mount Lemmon | Mount Lemmon Survey | · | 1.7 km | MPC · JPL |
| 853740 | 2009 SV_{223} | — | September 25, 2009 | Kitt Peak | Spacewatch | · | 350 m | MPC · JPL |
| 853741 | 2009 SO_{227} | — | August 18, 2009 | Kitt Peak | Spacewatch | · | 1.2 km | MPC · JPL |
| 853742 | 2009 SC_{232} | — | September 19, 2009 | Kitt Peak | Spacewatch | · | 1.3 km | MPC · JPL |
| 853743 | 2009 SD_{232} | — | September 19, 2009 | Kitt Peak | Spacewatch | · | 980 m | MPC · JPL |
| 853744 | 2009 SW_{234} | — | September 17, 2009 | Catalina | CSS | · | 2.1 km | MPC · JPL |
| 853745 | 2009 SS_{242} | — | September 24, 2009 | La Silla | A. Galád | · | 500 m | MPC · JPL |
| 853746 | 2009 SE_{244} | — | September 17, 2009 | Kitt Peak | Spacewatch | · | 730 m | MPC · JPL |
| 853747 | 2009 SQ_{250} | — | September 19, 2009 | Kitt Peak | Spacewatch | · | 1.7 km | MPC · JPL |
| 853748 | 2009 SK_{251} | — | September 20, 2009 | Kitt Peak | Spacewatch | NYS | 690 m | MPC · JPL |
| 853749 | 2009 SR_{253} | — | September 16, 2009 | Kitt Peak | Spacewatch | · | 1.7 km | MPC · JPL |
| 853750 | 2009 SZ_{257} | — | September 21, 2009 | Mount Lemmon | Mount Lemmon Survey | · | 2.2 km | MPC · JPL |
| 853751 | 2009 SA_{258} | — | September 21, 2009 | Mount Lemmon | Mount Lemmon Survey | KOR | 1.1 km | MPC · JPL |
| 853752 | 2009 SC_{259} | — | September 22, 2009 | Kitt Peak | Spacewatch | · | 1.5 km | MPC · JPL |
| 853753 | 2009 SR_{259} | — | September 22, 2009 | Mount Lemmon | Mount Lemmon Survey | · | 700 m | MPC · JPL |
| 853754 | 2009 SW_{266} | — | September 23, 2009 | Mount Lemmon | Mount Lemmon Survey | · | 1.3 km | MPC · JPL |
| 853755 | 2009 SO_{268} | — | September 14, 2009 | Kitt Peak | Spacewatch | H | 290 m | MPC · JPL |
| 853756 | 2009 SL_{270} | — | September 24, 2009 | Mount Lemmon | Mount Lemmon Survey | · | 470 m | MPC · JPL |
| 853757 | 2009 SW_{270} | — | September 16, 2009 | Kitt Peak | Spacewatch | V | 460 m | MPC · JPL |
| 853758 | 2009 SO_{271} | — | September 24, 2009 | Kitt Peak | Spacewatch | · | 2.1 km | MPC · JPL |
| 853759 | 2009 SK_{273} | — | September 15, 2009 | Kitt Peak | Spacewatch | · | 1.5 km | MPC · JPL |
| 853760 | 2009 SP_{273} | — | September 17, 2009 | Kitt Peak | Spacewatch | · | 1.4 km | MPC · JPL |
| 853761 | 2009 SX_{278} | — | September 25, 2009 | Kitt Peak | Spacewatch | NYS | 630 m | MPC · JPL |
| 853762 | 2009 SH_{280} | — | September 25, 2009 | Kitt Peak | Spacewatch | · | 520 m | MPC · JPL |
| 853763 | 2009 SQ_{280} | — | September 25, 2009 | Kitt Peak | Spacewatch | NYS | 840 m | MPC · JPL |
| 853764 | 2009 SN_{281} | — | September 17, 2009 | Kitt Peak | Spacewatch | · | 1.8 km | MPC · JPL |
| 853765 | 2009 SN_{282} | — | September 17, 2009 | Kitt Peak | Spacewatch | · | 1.7 km | MPC · JPL |
| 853766 | 2009 SE_{283} | — | September 17, 2009 | Kitt Peak | Spacewatch | · | 1.6 km | MPC · JPL |
| 853767 | 2009 SR_{285} | — | September 25, 2009 | Mount Lemmon | Mount Lemmon Survey | · | 2.5 km | MPC · JPL |
| 853768 | 2009 SL_{286} | — | June 18, 2005 | Mount Lemmon | Mount Lemmon Survey | · | 920 m | MPC · JPL |
| 853769 | 2009 SY_{286} | — | September 25, 2009 | Kitt Peak | Spacewatch | · | 1.6 km | MPC · JPL |
| 853770 | 2009 SY_{287} | — | September 17, 2009 | Kitt Peak | Spacewatch | · | 510 m | MPC · JPL |
| 853771 | 2009 SK_{291} | — | September 25, 2009 | Kitt Peak | Spacewatch | · | 1.5 km | MPC · JPL |
| 853772 | 2009 SS_{291} | — | September 25, 2009 | Mount Lemmon | Mount Lemmon Survey | · | 540 m | MPC · JPL |
| 853773 | 2009 SE_{292} | — | September 18, 2009 | Kitt Peak | Spacewatch | · | 1.6 km | MPC · JPL |
| 853774 | 2009 SG_{294} | — | September 27, 2009 | Mount Lemmon | Mount Lemmon Survey | · | 2.3 km | MPC · JPL |
| 853775 | 2009 SN_{294} | — | September 27, 2009 | Mount Lemmon | Mount Lemmon Survey | · | 440 m | MPC · JPL |
| 853776 | 2009 SA_{296} | — | September 27, 2009 | Mount Lemmon | Mount Lemmon Survey | · | 1.7 km | MPC · JPL |
| 853777 | 2009 SE_{296} | — | September 19, 2009 | Kitt Peak | Spacewatch | · | 1.9 km | MPC · JPL |
| 853778 | 2009 ST_{301} | — | September 16, 2009 | Mount Lemmon | Mount Lemmon Survey | · | 2.1 km | MPC · JPL |
| 853779 | 2009 SG_{303} | — | September 16, 2009 | Mount Lemmon | Mount Lemmon Survey | H | 290 m | MPC · JPL |
| 853780 | 2009 ST_{305} | — | September 17, 2009 | Mount Lemmon | Mount Lemmon Survey | · | 1.7 km | MPC · JPL |
| 853781 | 2009 SO_{309} | — | September 18, 2009 | Mount Lemmon | Mount Lemmon Survey | · | 1.3 km | MPC · JPL |
| 853782 | 2009 SH_{314} | — | September 19, 2009 | Kitt Peak | Spacewatch | · | 1.3 km | MPC · JPL |
| 853783 | 2009 SG_{315} | — | September 19, 2009 | Kitt Peak | Spacewatch | · | 1.3 km | MPC · JPL |
| 853784 | 2009 SD_{316} | — | September 19, 2009 | Kitt Peak | Spacewatch | · | 470 m | MPC · JPL |
| 853785 | 2009 SG_{318} | — | August 27, 2009 | Kitt Peak | Spacewatch | EOS | 1.3 km | MPC · JPL |
| 853786 | 2009 SO_{319} | — | September 20, 2009 | Kitt Peak | Spacewatch | · | 1.5 km | MPC · JPL |
| 853787 | 2009 SX_{319} | — | September 20, 2009 | Kitt Peak | Spacewatch | · | 1.8 km | MPC · JPL |
| 853788 | 2009 ST_{321} | — | September 21, 2009 | Kitt Peak | Spacewatch | · | 1.5 km | MPC · JPL |
| 853789 | 2009 ST_{322} | — | September 22, 2009 | Mount Lemmon | Mount Lemmon Survey | NYS | 790 m | MPC · JPL |
| 853790 | 2009 ST_{324} | — | September 25, 2009 | Kitt Peak | Spacewatch | 3:2 | 4.2 km | MPC · JPL |
| 853791 | 2009 SL_{325} | — | September 27, 2009 | Mount Lemmon | Mount Lemmon Survey | · | 2.0 km | MPC · JPL |
| 853792 | 2009 ST_{327} | — | September 26, 2009 | Kitt Peak | Spacewatch | · | 920 m | MPC · JPL |
| 853793 | 2009 ST_{335} | — | September 22, 2009 | Kitt Peak | Spacewatch | · | 920 m | MPC · JPL |
| 853794 | 2009 SU_{337} | — | September 16, 2009 | Kitt Peak | Spacewatch | · | 2.4 km | MPC · JPL |
| 853795 | 2009 SN_{340} | — | September 20, 2009 | Kitt Peak | Spacewatch | PHO | 820 m | MPC · JPL |
| 853796 | 2009 SR_{340} | — | September 21, 2009 | Mount Lemmon | Mount Lemmon Survey | · | 1.2 km | MPC · JPL |
| 853797 | 2009 SG_{341} | — | September 25, 2009 | Kitt Peak | Spacewatch | MAS | 580 m | MPC · JPL |
| 853798 | 2009 SO_{344} | — | September 18, 2009 | Kitt Peak | Spacewatch | · | 1.7 km | MPC · JPL |
| 853799 | 2009 SY_{344} | — | September 18, 2009 | Kitt Peak | Spacewatch | · | 480 m | MPC · JPL |
| 853800 | 2009 SG_{346} | — | September 23, 2009 | Mount Lemmon | Mount Lemmon Survey | · | 730 m | MPC · JPL |

== 853801–853900 ==
back to top

| Designation | | | Discovery | | | Properties | | Ref |
| Permanent | Provisional | Named after | Date | Site | Discoverer(s) | Category | Diam. | Ref |
|---|---|---|---|---|---|---|---|---|
| 853801 | 2009 SF_{347} | — | September 27, 2009 | Mount Lemmon | Mount Lemmon Survey | · | 1.6 km | MPC · JPL |
| 853802 | 2009 SR_{353} | — | September 23, 2009 | Mount Lemmon | Mount Lemmon Survey | · | 1.9 km | MPC · JPL |
| 853803 | 2009 SG_{356} | — | September 16, 2009 | Kitt Peak | Spacewatch | · | 650 m | MPC · JPL |
| 853804 | 2009 SU_{357} | — | September 27, 2009 | Kitt Peak | Spacewatch | · | 1.8 km | MPC · JPL |
| 853805 | 2009 SJ_{367} | — | September 16, 2009 | Kitt Peak | Spacewatch | · | 820 m | MPC · JPL |
| 853806 | 2009 SQ_{370} | — | June 7, 2016 | Haleakala | Pan-STARRS 1 | · | 780 m | MPC · JPL |
| 853807 | 2009 SJ_{371} | — | September 16, 2009 | Kitt Peak | Spacewatch | AEO | 1.0 km | MPC · JPL |
| 853808 | 2009 ST_{373} | — | September 28, 2009 | Kitt Peak | Spacewatch | · | 1.3 km | MPC · JPL |
| 853809 | 2009 SS_{374} | — | November 30, 2014 | Haleakala | Pan-STARRS 1 | · | 1.1 km | MPC · JPL |
| 853810 | 2009 SH_{376} | — | July 12, 2016 | Haleakala | Pan-STARRS 1 | 3:2 | 3.3 km | MPC · JPL |
| 853811 | 2009 SL_{376} | — | September 20, 2009 | Mount Lemmon | Mount Lemmon Survey | · | 510 m | MPC · JPL |
| 853812 | 2009 SB_{377} | — | April 23, 2015 | Haleakala | Pan-STARRS 1 | 3:2 | 4.5 km | MPC · JPL |
| 853813 | 2009 SE_{377} | — | January 30, 2011 | Mount Lemmon | Mount Lemmon Survey | · | 980 m | MPC · JPL |
| 853814 | 2009 SS_{379} | — | August 6, 2012 | Haleakala | Pan-STARRS 1 | · | 460 m | MPC · JPL |
| 853815 | 2009 SZ_{379} | — | September 18, 2009 | Kitt Peak | Spacewatch | · | 1.6 km | MPC · JPL |
| 853816 | 2009 SZ_{383} | — | October 28, 2016 | Haleakala | Pan-STARRS 1 | · | 610 m | MPC · JPL |
| 853817 | 2009 SZ_{384} | — | September 21, 2009 | Catalina | CSS | · | 500 m | MPC · JPL |
| 853818 | 2009 SE_{385} | — | June 18, 2013 | Haleakala | Pan-STARRS 1 | · | 1.0 km | MPC · JPL |
| 853819 | 2009 SX_{385} | — | December 11, 2014 | Mount Lemmon | Mount Lemmon Survey | · | 1.2 km | MPC · JPL |
| 853820 | 2009 SH_{387} | — | July 4, 2016 | Haleakala | Pan-STARRS 1 | · | 900 m | MPC · JPL |
| 853821 | 2009 SO_{387} | — | June 18, 2013 | Haleakala | Pan-STARRS 1 | · | 1.1 km | MPC · JPL |
| 853822 | 2009 SV_{387} | — | September 20, 2009 | Kitt Peak | Spacewatch | (5) | 840 m | MPC · JPL |
| 853823 | 2009 SM_{389} | — | November 5, 2016 | Mount Lemmon | Mount Lemmon Survey | · | 510 m | MPC · JPL |
| 853824 | 2009 SA_{390} | — | September 16, 2009 | Kitt Peak | Spacewatch | · | 1.5 km | MPC · JPL |
| 853825 | 2009 SS_{390} | — | September 16, 2014 | Haleakala | Pan-STARRS 1 | · | 2.4 km | MPC · JPL |
| 853826 | 2009 SS_{391} | — | January 28, 2017 | Haleakala | Pan-STARRS 1 | · | 1.9 km | MPC · JPL |
| 853827 | 2009 SM_{392} | — | July 11, 2016 | Haleakala | Pan-STARRS 1 | · | 470 m | MPC · JPL |
| 853828 | 2009 SO_{397} | — | September 27, 2009 | Mount Lemmon | Mount Lemmon Survey | 3:2 | 3.3 km | MPC · JPL |
| 853829 | 2009 SP_{397} | — | September 28, 2009 | Kitt Peak | Spacewatch | · | 380 m | MPC · JPL |
| 853830 | 2009 SA_{399} | — | September 16, 2009 | Kitt Peak | Spacewatch | EOS | 1.2 km | MPC · JPL |
| 853831 | 2009 SM_{399} | — | September 23, 2009 | Mount Lemmon | Mount Lemmon Survey | · | 520 m | MPC · JPL |
| 853832 | 2009 SB_{400} | — | September 30, 2009 | Mount Lemmon | Mount Lemmon Survey | EMA | 2.1 km | MPC · JPL |
| 853833 | 2009 SV_{400} | — | September 25, 2009 | Mount Lemmon | Mount Lemmon Survey | · | 2.0 km | MPC · JPL |
| 853834 | 2009 SS_{401} | — | September 25, 2009 | Kitt Peak | Spacewatch | V | 430 m | MPC · JPL |
| 853835 | 2009 SO_{402} | — | September 28, 2009 | Kitt Peak | Spacewatch | V | 410 m | MPC · JPL |
| 853836 | 2009 SE_{403} | — | September 25, 2009 | Mount Lemmon | Mount Lemmon Survey | · | 770 m | MPC · JPL |
| 853837 | 2009 SM_{403} | — | September 25, 2009 | Mount Lemmon | Mount Lemmon Survey | EOS | 1.1 km | MPC · JPL |
| 853838 | 2009 SE_{404} | — | September 27, 2009 | Charleston | R. Holmes, K. Dankov | NYS | 790 m | MPC · JPL |
| 853839 | 2009 SG_{404} | — | September 21, 2009 | Mount Lemmon | Mount Lemmon Survey | · | 2.9 km | MPC · JPL |
| 853840 | 2009 SY_{406} | — | September 21, 2009 | Kitt Peak | Spacewatch | · | 2.2 km | MPC · JPL |
| 853841 | 2009 SC_{407} | — | September 20, 2009 | Mount Lemmon | Mount Lemmon Survey | EOS | 1.4 km | MPC · JPL |
| 853842 | 2009 SG_{407} | — | September 28, 2009 | Kitt Peak | Spacewatch | · | 1.7 km | MPC · JPL |
| 853843 | 2009 SG_{408} | — | September 27, 2009 | Mount Lemmon | Mount Lemmon Survey | · | 940 m | MPC · JPL |
| 853844 | 2009 SK_{408} | — | September 19, 2009 | Mount Lemmon | Mount Lemmon Survey | · | 670 m | MPC · JPL |
| 853845 | 2009 SQ_{408} | — | September 25, 2009 | Kitt Peak | Spacewatch | · | 2.0 km | MPC · JPL |
| 853846 | 2009 SK_{409} | — | September 17, 2009 | Mount Lemmon | Mount Lemmon Survey | · | 580 m | MPC · JPL |
| 853847 | 2009 SR_{409} | — | September 21, 2009 | Mount Lemmon | Mount Lemmon Survey | · | 1.9 km | MPC · JPL |
| 853848 | 2009 SX_{409} | — | September 20, 2009 | Mount Lemmon | Mount Lemmon Survey | THM | 1.5 km | MPC · JPL |
| 853849 | 2009 SY_{409} | — | September 27, 2009 | Mount Lemmon | Mount Lemmon Survey | · | 1.6 km | MPC · JPL |
| 853850 | 2009 SB_{410} | — | September 29, 2009 | Mount Lemmon | Mount Lemmon Survey | · | 1.4 km | MPC · JPL |
| 853851 | 2009 SD_{410} | — | September 16, 2009 | Mount Lemmon | Mount Lemmon Survey | NYS | 710 m | MPC · JPL |
| 853852 | 2009 SW_{410} | — | September 21, 2009 | Mount Lemmon | Mount Lemmon Survey | EOS | 1.2 km | MPC · JPL |
| 853853 | 2009 SX_{410} | — | September 29, 2009 | Mount Lemmon | Mount Lemmon Survey | EOS | 1.3 km | MPC · JPL |
| 853854 | 2009 SE_{411} | — | September 28, 2009 | Kitt Peak | Spacewatch | · | 1.5 km | MPC · JPL |
| 853855 | 2009 SG_{411} | — | September 20, 2009 | Kitt Peak | Spacewatch | · | 1.7 km | MPC · JPL |
| 853856 | 2009 SP_{412} | — | September 22, 2009 | Kitt Peak | Spacewatch | · | 2.0 km | MPC · JPL |
| 853857 | 2009 SK_{413} | — | September 21, 2009 | Mount Lemmon | Mount Lemmon Survey | EOS | 1.4 km | MPC · JPL |
| 853858 | 2009 SC_{414} | — | September 28, 2009 | Mount Lemmon | Mount Lemmon Survey | · | 510 m | MPC · JPL |
| 853859 | 2009 SM_{414} | — | September 21, 2009 | Mount Lemmon | Mount Lemmon Survey | · | 1.1 km | MPC · JPL |
| 853860 | 2009 SO_{415} | — | September 18, 2009 | Kitt Peak | Spacewatch | TIN | 710 m | MPC · JPL |
| 853861 | 2009 SM_{416} | — | September 19, 2009 | Kitt Peak | Spacewatch | · | 550 m | MPC · JPL |
| 853862 | 2009 SB_{419} | — | September 16, 2009 | Mount Lemmon | Mount Lemmon Survey | · | 480 m | MPC · JPL |
| 853863 | 2009 ST_{422} | — | September 16, 2009 | Mount Lemmon | Mount Lemmon Survey | · | 460 m | MPC · JPL |
| 853864 | 2009 ST_{423} | — | September 23, 2009 | Kitt Peak | Spacewatch | EOS | 1.2 km | MPC · JPL |
| 853865 | 2009 SX_{423} | — | September 25, 2009 | Mount Lemmon | Mount Lemmon Survey | · | 720 m | MPC · JPL |
| 853866 | 2009 SK_{426} | — | September 18, 2009 | Kitt Peak | Spacewatch | · | 370 m | MPC · JPL |
| 853867 | 2009 SW_{426} | — | November 11, 2006 | Mount Lemmon | Mount Lemmon Survey | · | 430 m | MPC · JPL |
| 853868 | 2009 SO_{428} | — | September 26, 2009 | Mount Lemmon | Mount Lemmon Survey | · | 1.4 km | MPC · JPL |
| 853869 | 2009 SF_{430} | — | September 27, 2009 | Mount Lemmon | Mount Lemmon Survey | · | 1.3 km | MPC · JPL |
| 853870 | 2009 SP_{431} | — | September 17, 2009 | Kitt Peak | Spacewatch | · | 760 m | MPC · JPL |
| 853871 | 2009 TT_{4} | — | September 28, 2009 | Mount Lemmon | Mount Lemmon Survey | PHO | 720 m | MPC · JPL |
| 853872 | 2009 TE_{7} | — | October 12, 2009 | La Sagra | OAM | · | 630 m | MPC · JPL |
| 853873 | 2009 TK_{12} | — | October 14, 2009 | Catalina | CSS | APO · PHA | 260 m | MPC · JPL |
| 853874 | 2009 TQ_{13} | — | September 25, 2009 | Kitt Peak | Spacewatch | · | 1.5 km | MPC · JPL |
| 853875 | 2009 TC_{30} | — | October 15, 2009 | Mount Lemmon | Mount Lemmon Survey | · | 430 m | MPC · JPL |
| 853876 | 2009 TJ_{30} | — | October 15, 2009 | Mount Lemmon | Mount Lemmon Survey | · | 640 m | MPC · JPL |
| 853877 | 2009 TU_{37} | — | July 29, 2009 | Kitt Peak | Spacewatch | · | 2.3 km | MPC · JPL |
| 853878 | 2009 TU_{42} | — | October 14, 2009 | Mount Lemmon | Mount Lemmon Survey | · | 400 m | MPC · JPL |
| 853879 | 2009 TZ_{42} | — | October 1, 2009 | Mount Lemmon | Mount Lemmon Survey | INA | 1.7 km | MPC · JPL |
| 853880 | 2009 TX_{43} | — | October 14, 2009 | Mount Lemmon | Mount Lemmon Survey | · | 1.9 km | MPC · JPL |
| 853881 | 2009 TD_{47} | — | October 11, 2009 | La Sagra | OAM | · | 2.0 km | MPC · JPL |
| 853882 | 2009 TM_{47} | — | October 14, 2009 | Catalina | CSS | · | 690 m | MPC · JPL |
| 853883 | 2009 TK_{52} | — | December 26, 2014 | Haleakala | Pan-STARRS 1 | · | 1.1 km | MPC · JPL |
| 853884 | 2009 TF_{53} | — | August 22, 2014 | Haleakala | Pan-STARRS 1 | · | 1.8 km | MPC · JPL |
| 853885 | 2009 TM_{53} | — | October 14, 2009 | Mount Lemmon | Mount Lemmon Survey | EOS | 1.3 km | MPC · JPL |
| 853886 | 2009 TO_{55} | — | October 1, 2009 | Mount Lemmon | Mount Lemmon Survey | · | 2.0 km | MPC · JPL |
| 853887 | 2009 TS_{55} | — | October 14, 2009 | Mount Lemmon | Mount Lemmon Survey | · | 1.7 km | MPC · JPL |
| 853888 | 2009 TC_{56} | — | October 15, 2009 | Mount Lemmon | Mount Lemmon Survey | · | 2.5 km | MPC · JPL |
| 853889 | 2009 TP_{56} | — | October 15, 2009 | Mount Lemmon | Mount Lemmon Survey | · | 1.3 km | MPC · JPL |
| 853890 | 2009 TU_{58} | — | October 1, 2009 | Mount Lemmon | Mount Lemmon Survey | · | 430 m | MPC · JPL |
| 853891 | 2009 TH_{59} | — | October 14, 2009 | Mount Lemmon | Mount Lemmon Survey | · | 2.1 km | MPC · JPL |
| 853892 | 2009 UL_{3} | — | September 21, 2009 | Catalina | CSS | · | 520 m | MPC · JPL |
| 853893 | 2009 UR_{6} | — | September 15, 2009 | Kitt Peak | Spacewatch | · | 1.7 km | MPC · JPL |
| 853894 | 2009 UU_{6} | — | October 16, 2009 | Mount Lemmon | Mount Lemmon Survey | · | 1.1 km | MPC · JPL |
| 853895 | 2009 UQ_{9} | — | October 16, 2009 | Mount Lemmon | Mount Lemmon Survey | H | 310 m | MPC · JPL |
| 853896 | 2009 US_{9} | — | October 16, 2009 | Mount Lemmon | Mount Lemmon Survey | · | 2.1 km | MPC · JPL |
| 853897 | 2009 UU_{10} | — | September 18, 2009 | Kitt Peak | Spacewatch | EOS | 1.3 km | MPC · JPL |
| 853898 | 2009 UA_{18} | — | October 18, 2009 | Hibiscus | Teamo, N. | · | 2.0 km | MPC · JPL |
| 853899 | 2009 UO_{24} | — | October 18, 2009 | Mount Lemmon | Mount Lemmon Survey | BAR | 720 m | MPC · JPL |
| 853900 | 2009 UN_{29} | — | October 29, 2005 | Mount Lemmon | Mount Lemmon Survey | MAS | 590 m | MPC · JPL |

== 853901–854000 ==
back to top

| Designation | | | Discovery | | | Properties | | Ref |
| Permanent | Provisional | Named after | Date | Site | Discoverer(s) | Category | Diam. | Ref |
|---|---|---|---|---|---|---|---|---|
| 853901 | 2009 UV_{32} | — | September 21, 2009 | Mount Lemmon | Mount Lemmon Survey | · | 950 m | MPC · JPL |
| 853902 | 2009 UG_{38} | — | October 22, 2009 | Mount Lemmon | Mount Lemmon Survey | · | 2.3 km | MPC · JPL |
| 853903 | 2009 UZ_{38} | — | October 22, 2009 | Mount Lemmon | Mount Lemmon Survey | MIS | 1.7 km | MPC · JPL |
| 853904 | 2009 UP_{40} | — | September 22, 2009 | Mount Lemmon | Mount Lemmon Survey | · | 670 m | MPC · JPL |
| 853905 | 2009 UK_{43} | — | October 18, 2009 | Mount Lemmon | Mount Lemmon Survey | · | 1.2 km | MPC · JPL |
| 853906 | 2009 UL_{45} | — | September 17, 2009 | Mount Lemmon | Mount Lemmon Survey | · | 770 m | MPC · JPL |
| 853907 | 2009 UO_{45} | — | October 18, 2009 | Mount Lemmon | Mount Lemmon Survey | · | 1.6 km | MPC · JPL |
| 853908 | 2009 UU_{49} | — | October 22, 2009 | Mount Lemmon | Mount Lemmon Survey | KOR | 940 m | MPC · JPL |
| 853909 | 2009 UX_{49} | — | October 22, 2009 | Mount Lemmon | Mount Lemmon Survey | · | 1.6 km | MPC · JPL |
| 853910 | 2009 UU_{55} | — | September 21, 2009 | Mount Lemmon | Mount Lemmon Survey | · | 630 m | MPC · JPL |
| 853911 | 2009 UP_{58} | — | September 21, 2009 | Mount Lemmon | Mount Lemmon Survey | (5) | 1.0 km | MPC · JPL |
| 853912 | 2009 UZ_{58} | — | October 23, 2009 | Mount Lemmon | Mount Lemmon Survey | · | 2.2 km | MPC · JPL |
| 853913 | 2009 UK_{60} | — | October 17, 2009 | Mount Lemmon | Mount Lemmon Survey | EOS | 1.3 km | MPC · JPL |
| 853914 | 2009 UR_{60} | — | September 28, 2009 | Mount Lemmon | Mount Lemmon Survey | EOS | 1.3 km | MPC · JPL |
| 853915 | 2009 UY_{60} | — | September 28, 2009 | Mount Lemmon | Mount Lemmon Survey | · | 680 m | MPC · JPL |
| 853916 | 2009 UQ_{61} | — | September 28, 2009 | Mount Lemmon | Mount Lemmon Survey | · | 590 m | MPC · JPL |
| 853917 | 2009 UQ_{63} | — | September 18, 2009 | Kitt Peak | Spacewatch | · | 1.0 km | MPC · JPL |
| 853918 | 2009 UZ_{66} | — | October 17, 2009 | Mount Lemmon | Mount Lemmon Survey | · | 1.7 km | MPC · JPL |
| 853919 | 2009 UG_{67} | — | September 29, 2009 | Mount Lemmon | Mount Lemmon Survey | · | 1.8 km | MPC · JPL |
| 853920 | 2009 UO_{73} | — | October 18, 2009 | Mount Lemmon | Mount Lemmon Survey | MAS | 500 m | MPC · JPL |
| 853921 | 2009 UN_{76} | — | October 21, 2009 | Mount Lemmon | Mount Lemmon Survey | · | 1.0 km | MPC · JPL |
| 853922 | 2009 UY_{77} | — | September 14, 2009 | Kitt Peak | Spacewatch | · | 760 m | MPC · JPL |
| 853923 | 2009 UW_{79} | — | October 22, 2009 | Mount Lemmon | Mount Lemmon Survey | · | 2.2 km | MPC · JPL |
| 853924 | 2009 UW_{80} | — | September 15, 2009 | Kitt Peak | Spacewatch | · | 690 m | MPC · JPL |
| 853925 | 2009 UD_{82} | — | October 22, 2009 | Mount Lemmon | Mount Lemmon Survey | · | 2.1 km | MPC · JPL |
| 853926 | 2009 UG_{85} | — | October 23, 2009 | Mount Lemmon | Mount Lemmon Survey | · | 780 m | MPC · JPL |
| 853927 | 2009 UO_{92} | — | September 21, 2009 | Mount Lemmon | Mount Lemmon Survey | · | 2.3 km | MPC · JPL |
| 853928 | 2009 UU_{95} | — | October 22, 2009 | Mount Lemmon | Mount Lemmon Survey | · | 350 m | MPC · JPL |
| 853929 | 2009 UG_{100} | — | October 23, 2009 | Mount Lemmon | Mount Lemmon Survey | · | 800 m | MPC · JPL |
| 853930 | 2009 UK_{101} | — | October 23, 2009 | Mount Lemmon | Mount Lemmon Survey | · | 1.3 km | MPC · JPL |
| 853931 | 2009 UO_{107} | — | October 22, 2009 | Mount Lemmon | Mount Lemmon Survey | · | 1.6 km | MPC · JPL |
| 853932 | 2009 UP_{108} | — | October 23, 2009 | Kitt Peak | Spacewatch | · | 1.4 km | MPC · JPL |
| 853933 | 2009 UV_{108} | — | October 23, 2009 | Kitt Peak | Spacewatch | · | 700 m | MPC · JPL |
| 853934 | 2009 UF_{110} | — | November 29, 2005 | Mount Lemmon | Mount Lemmon Survey | · | 1 km | MPC · JPL |
| 853935 | 2009 UZ_{110} | — | October 23, 2009 | Kitt Peak | Spacewatch | · | 2.2 km | MPC · JPL |
| 853936 | 2009 UE_{112} | — | September 29, 2009 | Mount Lemmon | Mount Lemmon Survey | · | 980 m | MPC · JPL |
| 853937 | 2009 UH_{113} | — | September 28, 2009 | Kitt Peak | Spacewatch | THM | 1.7 km | MPC · JPL |
| 853938 | 2009 UV_{113} | — | October 21, 2009 | Mount Lemmon | Mount Lemmon Survey | THM | 1.4 km | MPC · JPL |
| 853939 | 2009 UM_{119} | — | January 28, 2007 | Mount Lemmon | Mount Lemmon Survey | · | 450 m | MPC · JPL |
| 853940 | 2009 UT_{119} | — | September 27, 2009 | Kitt Peak | Spacewatch | THM | 1.4 km | MPC · JPL |
| 853941 | 2009 UC_{120} | — | September 27, 2009 | Kitt Peak | Spacewatch | · | 1.3 km | MPC · JPL |
| 853942 | 2009 US_{120} | — | September 26, 2009 | Kitt Peak | Spacewatch | · | 2.1 km | MPC · JPL |
| 853943 | 2009 UU_{121} | — | October 25, 2009 | Mount Lemmon | Mount Lemmon Survey | 3:2 | 4.2 km | MPC · JPL |
| 853944 | 2009 UN_{122} | — | September 27, 2009 | Mount Lemmon | Mount Lemmon Survey | · | 1.1 km | MPC · JPL |
| 853945 | 2009 UU_{122} | — | October 26, 2009 | Mount Lemmon | Mount Lemmon Survey | · | 470 m | MPC · JPL |
| 853946 | 2009 UX_{124} | — | October 26, 2009 | Mount Lemmon | Mount Lemmon Survey | · | 1.9 km | MPC · JPL |
| 853947 | 2009 UX_{133} | — | October 22, 2009 | Mount Lemmon | Mount Lemmon Survey | EOS | 1.3 km | MPC · JPL |
| 853948 | 2009 UA_{135} | — | October 12, 2009 | Mount Lemmon | Mount Lemmon Survey | · | 1.2 km | MPC · JPL |
| 853949 | 2009 UF_{135} | — | October 25, 2009 | Kitt Peak | Spacewatch | · | 1.3 km | MPC · JPL |
| 853950 | 2009 UJ_{150} | — | October 18, 2009 | Mount Lemmon | Mount Lemmon Survey | · | 660 m | MPC · JPL |
| 853951 | 2009 US_{160} | — | October 26, 2009 | Kitt Peak | Spacewatch | MAS | 450 m | MPC · JPL |
| 853952 | 2009 UL_{162} | — | October 26, 2009 | Kitt Peak | Spacewatch | · | 580 m | MPC · JPL |
| 853953 | 2009 UU_{164} | — | September 23, 2014 | Mount Lemmon | Mount Lemmon Survey | · | 1.5 km | MPC · JPL |
| 853954 | 2009 UV_{164} | — | October 22, 2009 | Mount Lemmon | Mount Lemmon Survey | V | 430 m | MPC · JPL |
| 853955 | 2009 UZ_{164} | — | July 31, 2014 | Haleakala | Pan-STARRS 1 | · | 2.3 km | MPC · JPL |
| 853956 | 2009 UG_{165} | — | December 18, 2004 | Mount Lemmon | Mount Lemmon Survey | · | 1.2 km | MPC · JPL |
| 853957 | 2009 UT_{165} | — | October 23, 2009 | Mount Lemmon | Mount Lemmon Survey | · | 1.6 km | MPC · JPL |
| 853958 | 2009 UZ_{165} | — | October 16, 2009 | Catalina | CSS | · | 2.1 km | MPC · JPL |
| 853959 | 2009 UO_{166} | — | January 13, 2011 | Mount Lemmon | Mount Lemmon Survey | T_{j} (2.97) · 3:2 | 3.2 km | MPC · JPL |
| 853960 | 2009 UZ_{166} | — | October 26, 2013 | Catalina | CSS | · | 1.4 km | MPC · JPL |
| 853961 | 2009 UN_{167} | — | December 13, 2010 | Mount Lemmon | Mount Lemmon Survey | · | 1.9 km | MPC · JPL |
| 853962 | 2009 UB_{169} | — | October 1, 2014 | Mount Lemmon | Mount Lemmon Survey | · | 2.5 km | MPC · JPL |
| 853963 | 2009 UH_{169} | — | October 23, 2009 | Mount Lemmon | Mount Lemmon Survey | · | 1.1 km | MPC · JPL |
| 853964 | 2009 UR_{169} | — | October 16, 2009 | Mount Lemmon | Mount Lemmon Survey | TIR | 2.3 km | MPC · JPL |
| 853965 | 2009 UM_{170} | — | September 11, 1996 | Kitt Peak | Spacewatch | · | 910 m | MPC · JPL |
| 853966 | 2009 UV_{170} | — | October 27, 2009 | Kitt Peak | Spacewatch | · | 2.4 km | MPC · JPL |
| 853967 | 2009 UW_{170} | — | October 21, 2009 | Mount Lemmon | Mount Lemmon Survey | · | 2.1 km | MPC · JPL |
| 853968 | 2009 UD_{172} | — | March 9, 2011 | Mount Lemmon | Mount Lemmon Survey | · | 520 m | MPC · JPL |
| 853969 | 2009 UH_{172} | — | October 27, 2009 | Mount Lemmon | Mount Lemmon Survey | · | 640 m | MPC · JPL |
| 853970 | 2009 UE_{173} | — | February 7, 2011 | Mount Lemmon | Mount Lemmon Survey | · | 1.8 km | MPC · JPL |
| 853971 | 2009 UL_{173} | — | October 18, 2009 | Mount Lemmon | Mount Lemmon Survey | (12739) | 1.2 km | MPC · JPL |
| 853972 | 2009 UM_{176} | — | October 24, 2009 | Kitt Peak | Spacewatch | · | 660 m | MPC · JPL |
| 853973 | 2009 UL_{177} | — | October 30, 2009 | Mount Lemmon | Mount Lemmon Survey | (5) | 830 m | MPC · JPL |
| 853974 | 2009 UR_{178} | — | October 18, 2009 | Mount Lemmon | Mount Lemmon Survey | · | 690 m | MPC · JPL |
| 853975 | 2009 UX_{179} | — | October 18, 2009 | La Sagra | OAM | · | 580 m | MPC · JPL |
| 853976 | 2009 UA_{180} | — | October 22, 2009 | Mount Lemmon | Mount Lemmon Survey | · | 1.7 km | MPC · JPL |
| 853977 | 2009 UB_{180} | — | October 16, 2009 | Catalina | CSS | · | 2.1 km | MPC · JPL |
| 853978 | 2009 UG_{181} | — | October 22, 2009 | Mount Lemmon | Mount Lemmon Survey | · | 1.6 km | MPC · JPL |
| 853979 | 2009 UT_{181} | — | October 22, 2009 | Mount Lemmon | Mount Lemmon Survey | · | 1.8 km | MPC · JPL |
| 853980 | 2009 UW_{181} | — | October 25, 2009 | Kitt Peak | Spacewatch | EOS | 1.2 km | MPC · JPL |
| 853981 | 2009 UR_{182} | — | October 17, 2009 | Mount Lemmon | Mount Lemmon Survey | · | 1.5 km | MPC · JPL |
| 853982 | 2009 US_{182} | — | October 26, 2009 | Mount Lemmon | Mount Lemmon Survey | · | 1.7 km | MPC · JPL |
| 853983 | 2009 UT_{182} | — | October 25, 2009 | Kitt Peak | Spacewatch | · | 1.6 km | MPC · JPL |
| 853984 | 2009 UA_{183} | — | October 23, 2009 | Mount Lemmon | Mount Lemmon Survey | · | 2.4 km | MPC · JPL |
| 853985 | 2009 UJ_{183} | — | October 21, 2009 | Mount Lemmon | Mount Lemmon Survey | · | 1.6 km | MPC · JPL |
| 853986 | 2009 UM_{184} | — | October 16, 2009 | Mount Lemmon | Mount Lemmon Survey | · | 1.8 km | MPC · JPL |
| 853987 | 2009 UO_{184} | — | October 16, 2009 | Mount Lemmon | Mount Lemmon Survey | · | 1.6 km | MPC · JPL |
| 853988 | 2009 UE_{185} | — | October 22, 2009 | Mount Lemmon | Mount Lemmon Survey | · | 2.6 km | MPC · JPL |
| 853989 | 2009 UQ_{185} | — | October 25, 2009 | Kitt Peak | Spacewatch | · | 1.9 km | MPC · JPL |
| 853990 | 2009 UA_{186} | — | October 22, 2009 | Mount Lemmon | Mount Lemmon Survey | · | 1.2 km | MPC · JPL |
| 853991 | 2009 UC_{186} | — | October 30, 2009 | Mount Lemmon | Mount Lemmon Survey | · | 1.3 km | MPC · JPL |
| 853992 | 2009 UV_{186} | — | October 16, 2009 | Mount Lemmon | Mount Lemmon Survey | · | 470 m | MPC · JPL |
| 853993 | 2009 UD_{189} | — | October 24, 2009 | Kitt Peak | Spacewatch | · | 520 m | MPC · JPL |
| 853994 | 2009 UR_{189} | — | October 16, 2009 | Mount Lemmon | Mount Lemmon Survey | L4 | 5.3 km | MPC · JPL |
| 853995 | 2009 UB_{190} | — | October 22, 2009 | Mount Lemmon | Mount Lemmon Survey | · | 1.8 km | MPC · JPL |
| 853996 | 2009 UF_{190} | — | October 21, 2009 | Mount Lemmon | Mount Lemmon Survey | L4 | 6.8 km | MPC · JPL |
| 853997 | 2009 UH_{190} | — | October 26, 2009 | Mount Lemmon | Mount Lemmon Survey | · | 1.6 km | MPC · JPL |
| 853998 | 2009 UZ_{190} | — | October 18, 2009 | Mount Lemmon | Mount Lemmon Survey | H | 370 m | MPC · JPL |
| 853999 | 2009 UL_{191} | — | October 16, 2009 | Mount Lemmon | Mount Lemmon Survey | · | 710 m | MPC · JPL |
| 854000 | 2009 UL_{193} | — | October 18, 2009 | Mount Lemmon | Mount Lemmon Survey | · | 910 m | MPC · JPL |

back to top
