= (574372) 2010 JO179 =

Large scattered-disc object

(574372) 2010 JO_{179}
Discovery
- Discovered by: Pan-STARRS 1
- Discovery site: Haleakala Obs.
- Discovery date: 10 May 2010

Designations
- Minor planet category: TNO · SDO · 5:21 res. p-DP · distant

Orbital characteristics(barycentric) (Note: These orbital elements are expressed in terms of the Solar System Barycenter (SSB) as the frame of reference. Due to planetary perturbations, the Sun revolves around the SSB at non-negligible distances, so heliocentric-frame orbital elements and distances (such as those given in JPL's Small-Body Database) can vary on short timescales.)
- Epoch 31 May 2020 (JD 2459000.5)
- Uncertainty parameter 2
- Observation arc: 69.54 yr (25,399 days)
- Earliest precovery date: 4 February 1951 (POSS-I)
- Aphelion: 118.993 AU
- Perihelion: 39.578 AU
- Semi-major axis: 79.285 AU
- Eccentricity: 0.50081
- Orbital period (sidereal): 705.99 yr (257,867 d)
- Mean anomaly: 33.774°
- Mean motion: 0° 0^{m} 5.04^{s} / day
- Inclination: 32.039°
- Longitude of ascending node: 147.186°
- Time of perihelion: 1951-Sep-13
- Argument of perihelion: 10.777°
- Known satellites: 0

Physical characteristics
- Mean diameter: 600–900 km (implied by estimated albedo); 647 km?
- Synodic rotation period: 30.6 h 30.6324 h (best fit)
- Geometric albedo: 0.07 ~ 0.21 (estimated); 0.124 (assumed)
- Spectral type: g−r = 0.88±0.21 r−i = 0.34±0.26 r−z = 0.13±0.22
- Absolute magnitude (H): 3.44±0.10 (R-band); 3.83

(574372) 2010 JO_{179} is a large, high-order resonant trans-Neptunian object in the outermost regions of the Solar System, probably somewhere between 600 and 900 kilometers (370 and 560 miles) in diameter. Long-term observations suggest that the object is in a meta-stable 5:21 resonance with Neptune. Other sources classify it as a scattered disc object. It is possibly large enough to be a dwarf planet.

2010 JO_{179} has not yet been imaged by high-resolution telescopes, so it has no known moons. The Hubble Space Telescope is planned to image 2010 JO_{179} in 2026, which should determine if it has significantly sized moons.

== Observation history ==
The libration of 2010 JO_{179}'s nominal orbit, in a frame co-rotating with Neptune (click image to view animation)

The Minor Planet Center credits the object's first official observation on 10 May 2010 to Pan-STARRS (F51) at Haleakala Observatory, Hawaii, United States. The observations were made by Pan-STARRS' Outer Solar System Survey. There are 4 February 1951 precovery images from the Palomar Observatory Sky Survey, extending the observation arc by approximately 60 years. The precovery images are from the same year the object came to perihelion (closest approach to the Sun).

=== Occultation ===
On 1 July 2021, an occultation by 2010 JO_{179} occurred.

== Provisional designation and numbering ==
The provisional designation of 2010 JO_{179} indicates its discovery date, the first letter represents the first half of May and the second letter and numbers means that it is the 4515th object discovered during that half-month. (Note: The second letter 'O' indicates that it is the 15th object discovered on the 180th cycle of discoveries. Each completed cycle consists of 25 letters representing discoveries, hence 15 + (180 completed cycles × 25 letters) = 4515.) This minor planet was numbered by the Minor Planet Center on 10 August 2021, receiving the number 574372 in the minor planet catalog M.P.C. 133504. As of October 2026, it has not been named.

== Orbit and classification ==
2010 JO_{179} orbits the Sun at a distance of 39.6–119.0 AU once every 705 years and 11 months (semi-major axis of 79.3 AU). Its orbit has a high eccentricity of 0.50 and an inclination of 32° with respect to the ecliptic.

== Physical characteristics ==
=== Diameter and albedo ===
The object's mean diameter has been estimated to measure 600 to 900 kilometres (370 to 560 mi), based on an assumed albedo of 0.21 to 0.07. Johnston's archive estimates a diameter of 647 kilometres (402 mi), assuming an albedo of 0.124. On 1 July 2021, an occultation by 2010 JO_{179} occurred according to a 2022 paper, the occultation shows that 2010 JO_{179} has an elongated shape with a diameter of about 600 km. (Note: On page 11, there is a screenshot of "figure A1" regarding the occultation by 2010 JO_{179} on 1 July 2021. The lower right-hand panel of the figure presents a preliminary limb of 2010 JO_{179} obtained from that occultation. It shows that 2010 JO_{179} has an elongated shape with a diameter of about 600 km.)

=== Rotation and light curve ===
Photometric observations of 2010 JO_{179} gave a monomodal lightcurve with a slow rotation period of 30.6 hours, suggesting a rather spherical shape with significant albedo patchiness. An alternative period solution of a bimodal lightcurve is considered less likely. It would double the period and imply an ellipsoidal shape with an axis-ratio of at least 1.58.

=== Surface and spectra ===
2010 JO_{179} has color indices of g−r of 0.88±0.21, r−i of 0.34±0.26 and r−z of 0.13±0.22, making it have a moderately red surface.
