= List of minor planets: 574001–575000 =

The following is a partial list of minor planets, running from minor-planet number 574001 through 575000, inclusive. The primary data for this and other partial lists is based on JPL's "Small-Body Orbital Elements" and data available from the Minor Planet Center. Critical list information is also provided by the MPC, unless otherwise specified from Lowell Observatory. A detailed description of the table's columns and additional sources are given on the main page including a complete list of every page in this series, and a statistical break-up on the dynamical classification of minor planets.

Also see the summary list of all named bodies in numerical and alphabetical order, and the corresponding naming citations for the number range of this particular list. New namings may only be added to this list after official publication, as the preannouncement of names is condemned by the Working Group for Small Bodies Nomenclature of the International Astronomical Union.

Near-Earth obj.	MBA (inner)	MBA (outer)	Centaur
Mars-crosser	MBA (middle)	Jupiter trojan	Trans-Neptunian obj.
Unclassified

== 574001–574100 ==
Designation			Discovery			Properties		Ref
Permanent	Provisional	Named after	Date	Site	Discoverer(s)	Category	Diam.	Ref
574001	2009 WK_{280}	—	November 24, 2009	Kitt Peak	Spacewatch	DOR	2.1 km	MPC · JPL
574002	2009 WV_{282}	—	November 10, 1999	Kitt Peak	Spacewatch	·	1.7 km	MPC · JPL
574003	2009 WS_{284}	—	November 27, 2009	Kitt Peak	Spacewatch	·	940 m	MPC · JPL
574004	2009 WT_{284}	—	August 20, 2017	Haleakala	Pan-STARRS 1	·	1.1 km	MPC · JPL
574005	2009 WW_{286}	—	November 16, 2009	Mount Lemmon	Mount Lemmon Survey	·	1.8 km	MPC · JPL
574006	2009 WD_{287}	—	November 3, 2014	Mount Lemmon	Mount Lemmon Survey	·	1.8 km	MPC · JPL
574007	2009 WV_{287}	—	April 13, 2011	Mount Lemmon	Mount Lemmon Survey	EUN	940 m	MPC · JPL
574008	2009 WH_{288}	—	November 21, 2009	Kitt Peak	Spacewatch	·	1.5 km	MPC · JPL
574009	2009 WR_{288}	—	November 24, 2009	Kitt Peak	Spacewatch	·	840 m	MPC · JPL
574010	2009 WU_{288}	—	November 17, 2009	Kitt Peak	Spacewatch	·	1.4 km	MPC · JPL
574011	2009 WR_{289}	—	November 17, 2009	Mount Lemmon	Mount Lemmon Survey	·	1.6 km	MPC · JPL
574012	2009 WC_{290}	—	November 17, 2009	Kitt Peak	Spacewatch	BAR	1.4 km	MPC · JPL
574013	2009 XO_{5}	—	October 7, 2004	Kitt Peak	Spacewatch	·	1.7 km	MPC · JPL
574014	2009 XO_{6}	—	December 11, 2009	Mount Lemmon	Mount Lemmon Survey	·	1.3 km	MPC · JPL
574015	2009 XV_{6}	—	April 11, 2003	Kitt Peak	Spacewatch	·	1.3 km	MPC · JPL
574016	2009 XM_{9}	—	December 12, 2009	Tzec Maun	D. Chestnov, A. Novichonok	·	1.6 km	MPC · JPL
574017	2009 XV_{9}	—	December 9, 2009	La Sagra	OAM	·	2.0 km	MPC · JPL
574018	2009 XJ_{10}	—	November 8, 2009	Mount Lemmon	Mount Lemmon Survey	(5)	1.2 km	MPC · JPL
574019	2009 XB_{11}	—	December 10, 2009	Mount Lemmon	Mount Lemmon Survey	·	630 m	MPC · JPL
574020	2009 XC_{12}	—	November 8, 2009	Kitt Peak	Spacewatch	(5)	1.1 km	MPC · JPL
574021	2009 XY_{14}	—	November 11, 2009	Mount Lemmon	Mount Lemmon Survey	·	2.2 km	MPC · JPL
574022	2009 XG_{20}	—	December 12, 2009	Pla D'Arguines	R. Ferrando, Ferrando, M.	·	2.0 km	MPC · JPL
574023	2009 XR_{20}	—	May 26, 2007	Mount Lemmon	Mount Lemmon Survey	·	1.8 km	MPC · JPL
574024	2009 XZ_{20}	—	December 15, 2009	Mount Lemmon	Mount Lemmon Survey	·	1.5 km	MPC · JPL
574025	2009 XW_{21}	—	November 23, 2009	Catalina	CSS	(5)	1.3 km	MPC · JPL
574026	2009 XP_{26}	—	December 13, 2009	Mount Lemmon	Mount Lemmon Survey	·	1.6 km	MPC · JPL
574027	2009 XP_{27}	—	December 15, 2009	Mount Lemmon	Mount Lemmon Survey	·	1.2 km	MPC · JPL
574028	2009 XD_{28}	—	January 18, 2015	Kitt Peak	Spacewatch	·	1.5 km	MPC · JPL
574029	2009 XX_{28}	—	December 10, 2009	Mount Lemmon	Mount Lemmon Survey	·	1.4 km	MPC · JPL
574030	2009 YZ	—	November 8, 2009	Kitt Peak	Spacewatch	AGN	1.1 km	MPC · JPL
574031	2009 YJ_{2}	—	October 23, 2004	Kitt Peak	Spacewatch	NEM	1.9 km	MPC · JPL
574032	2009 YK_{4}	—	August 5, 2008	Siding Spring	SSS	·	1.6 km	MPC · JPL
574033	2009 YH_{9}	—	December 17, 2009	Kitt Peak	Spacewatch	·	2.0 km	MPC · JPL
574034	2009 YQ_{15}	—	September 23, 2003	Palomar	NEAT	·	3.2 km	MPC · JPL
574035	2009 YG_{17}	—	December 20, 2009	Kitt Peak	Spacewatch	·	1.6 km	MPC · JPL
574036	2009 YV_{21}	—	December 24, 2009	Tzec Maun	D. Chestnov, A. Novichonok	·	1.8 km	MPC · JPL
574037	2009 YU_{22}	—	December 18, 2009	Mount Lemmon	Mount Lemmon Survey	·	1.8 km	MPC · JPL
574038	2009 YP_{24}	—	August 27, 2005	Palomar	NEAT	·	770 m	MPC · JPL
574039	2009 YU_{26}	—	December 17, 2009	Kitt Peak	Spacewatch	·	1.5 km	MPC · JPL
574040	2009 YV_{26}	—	December 18, 2009	Mount Lemmon	Mount Lemmon Survey	·	2.0 km	MPC · JPL
574041	2009 YW_{26}	—	July 25, 2004	Anderson Mesa	LONEOS	·	1.5 km	MPC · JPL
574042	2009 YY_{26}	—	November 9, 2013	Mount Lemmon	Mount Lemmon Survey	(5)	980 m	MPC · JPL
574043	2009 YE_{27}	—	November 27, 2013	Haleakala	Pan-STARRS 1	·	2.1 km	MPC · JPL
574044	2009 YJ_{27}	—	December 18, 2009	Mount Lemmon	Mount Lemmon Survey	·	1.3 km	MPC · JPL
574045	2009 YA_{28}	—	January 15, 2015	Haleakala	Pan-STARRS 1	·	1.9 km	MPC · JPL
574046	2009 YE_{29}	—	November 20, 2009	Mount Lemmon	Mount Lemmon Survey	·	1.9 km	MPC · JPL
574047	2009 YM_{29}	—	November 28, 2013	Kitt Peak	Spacewatch	·	1.5 km	MPC · JPL
574048	2009 YS_{31}	—	December 20, 2009	Mount Lemmon	Mount Lemmon Survey	·	1.8 km	MPC · JPL
574049	2009 YV_{31}	—	December 17, 2009	Kitt Peak	Spacewatch	·	1.7 km	MPC · JPL
574050	2009 YN_{32}	—	December 19, 2009	Mount Lemmon	Mount Lemmon Survey	·	1.6 km	MPC · JPL
574051	2010 AL_{1}	—	January 5, 2010	Kitt Peak	Spacewatch	·	610 m	MPC · JPL
574052	2010 AP_{5}	—	November 11, 2009	Mount Lemmon	Mount Lemmon Survey	·	1.9 km	MPC · JPL
574053	2010 AW_{10}	—	October 17, 1995	Kitt Peak	Spacewatch	·	1.6 km	MPC · JPL
574054	2010 AY_{15}	—	January 7, 2010	Mount Lemmon	Mount Lemmon Survey	(5)	1.2 km	MPC · JPL
574055	2010 AE_{19}	—	December 19, 2009	Kitt Peak	Spacewatch	·	2.2 km	MPC · JPL
574056	2010 AL_{22}	—	September 7, 2008	Catalina	CSS	EUN	1.7 km	MPC · JPL
574057	2010 AB_{24}	—	January 6, 2010	Kitt Peak	Spacewatch	·	2.2 km	MPC · JPL
574058	2010 AH_{24}	—	September 24, 2008	Mount Lemmon	Mount Lemmon Survey	·	2.0 km	MPC · JPL
574059	2010 AQ_{24}	—	January 6, 2010	Kitt Peak	Spacewatch	·	1.7 km	MPC · JPL
574060	2010 AS_{24}	—	November 21, 2009	Mount Lemmon	Mount Lemmon Survey	·	2.2 km	MPC · JPL
574061	2010 AM_{27}	—	December 31, 2000	Kitt Peak	Spacewatch	·	2.2 km	MPC · JPL
574062	2010 AQ_{27}	—	November 16, 2009	Mount Lemmon	Mount Lemmon Survey	·	1.8 km	MPC · JPL
574063	2010 AM_{30}	—	November 16, 2009	Kitt Peak	Spacewatch	MRX	1.0 km	MPC · JPL
574064	2010 AQ_{30}	—	January 5, 2010	Kitt Peak	Spacewatch	·	700 m	MPC · JPL
574065	2010 AS_{31}	—	January 6, 2010	Kitt Peak	Spacewatch	·	690 m	MPC · JPL
574066	2010 AX_{33}	—	January 7, 2010	Kitt Peak	Spacewatch	·	1.2 km	MPC · JPL
574067	2010 AS_{34}	—	January 7, 2010	Kitt Peak	Spacewatch	·	820 m	MPC · JPL
574068	2010 AT_{37}	—	January 7, 2010	Kitt Peak	Spacewatch	·	1.7 km	MPC · JPL
574069	2010 AL_{44}	—	January 7, 2010	Kitt Peak	Spacewatch	·	1.8 km	MPC · JPL
574070	2010 AN_{45}	—	January 7, 2010	Mount Lemmon	Mount Lemmon Survey	·	1.5 km	MPC · JPL
574071	2010 AX_{46}	—	December 15, 2009	Mount Lemmon	Mount Lemmon Survey	·	1.8 km	MPC · JPL
574072	2010 AH_{47}	—	January 8, 2010	Kitt Peak	Spacewatch	·	520 m	MPC · JPL
574073	2010 AU_{47}	—	January 30, 2006	Kitt Peak	Spacewatch	·	1.2 km	MPC · JPL
574074	2010 AC_{48}	—	January 8, 2010	Kitt Peak	Spacewatch	·	2.5 km	MPC · JPL
574075	2010 AS_{49}	—	October 20, 2008	Mount Lemmon	Mount Lemmon Survey	·	1.6 km	MPC · JPL
574076	2010 AM_{51}	—	January 8, 2010	Kitt Peak	Spacewatch	·	1.9 km	MPC · JPL
574077	2010 AX_{51}	—	September 3, 2008	Kitt Peak	Spacewatch	·	1.4 km	MPC · JPL
574078	2010 AJ_{54}	—	January 8, 2010	Kitt Peak	Spacewatch	(5)	1.1 km	MPC · JPL
574079	2010 AJ_{55}	—	February 24, 2006	Kitt Peak	Spacewatch	·	1.9 km	MPC · JPL
574080	2010 AS_{58}	—	January 11, 2010	Kitt Peak	Spacewatch	·	660 m	MPC · JPL
574081	2010 AK_{65}	—	January 11, 2010	Kitt Peak	Spacewatch	·	2.4 km	MPC · JPL
574082	2010 AO_{141}	—	December 16, 2009	Kitt Peak	Spacewatch	MAS	580 m	MPC · JPL
574083	2010 AD_{142}	—	December 11, 2004	Kitt Peak	Spacewatch	·	2.1 km	MPC · JPL
574084	2010 AM_{142}	—	December 18, 2009	Kitt Peak	Spacewatch	·	1.7 km	MPC · JPL
574085	2010 AU_{142}	—	January 7, 2010	Kitt Peak	Spacewatch	·	1.7 km	MPC · JPL
574086	2010 AW_{143}	—	January 8, 2010	Mount Lemmon	Mount Lemmon Survey	NEM	2.0 km	MPC · JPL
574087	2010 AV_{144}	—	December 1, 2014	Haleakala	Pan-STARRS 1	·	1.6 km	MPC · JPL
574088	2010 AG_{153}	—	February 6, 2014	Catalina	CSS	·	2.4 km	MPC · JPL
574089	2010 AA_{154}	—	November 8, 2013	Catalina	CSS	·	1.5 km	MPC · JPL
574090	2010 AD_{155}	—	August 31, 2017	Haleakala	Pan-STARRS 1	·	1.2 km	MPC · JPL
574091	2010 AC_{158}	—	January 21, 2015	Haleakala	Pan-STARRS 1	·	1.3 km	MPC · JPL
574092	2010 AX_{158}	—	November 9, 2013	Haleakala	Pan-STARRS 1	·	1.3 km	MPC · JPL
574093	2010 AW_{159}	—	January 12, 2010	Mount Lemmon	Mount Lemmon Survey	·	1.5 km	MPC · JPL
574094	2010 AO_{161}	—	January 6, 2010	Kitt Peak	Spacewatch	·	670 m	MPC · JPL
574095	2010 AQ_{161}	—	January 7, 2010	Mount Lemmon	Mount Lemmon Survey	·	660 m	MPC · JPL
574096	2010 AU_{161}	—	January 6, 2010	Kitt Peak	Spacewatch	·	1.6 km	MPC · JPL
574097	2010 AW_{161}	—	January 8, 2010	Kitt Peak	Spacewatch	·	1.0 km	MPC · JPL
574098	2010 AC_{162}	—	January 6, 2010	Kitt Peak	Spacewatch	·	520 m	MPC · JPL
574099	2010 AP_{163}	—	January 11, 2010	Kitt Peak	Spacewatch	·	790 m	MPC · JPL
574100	2010 AQ_{163}	—	January 7, 2010	Kitt Peak	Spacewatch	·	1.4 km	MPC · JPL

== 574101–574200 ==
back to top

Designation			Discovery			Properties		Ref
Permanent	Provisional	Named after	Date	Site	Discoverer(s)	Category	Diam.	Ref
574101	2010 BJ_{144}	—	December 22, 2008	Mount Lemmon	Mount Lemmon Survey	·	1.4 km	MPC · JPL
574102	2010 BL_{146}	—	December 26, 2014	Haleakala	Pan-STARRS 1	·	1.5 km	MPC · JPL
574103	2010 BW_{151}	—	August 14, 2014	Haleakala	Pan-STARRS 1	·	2.5 km	MPC · JPL
574104	2010 CE_{5}	—	February 8, 2010	Kitt Peak	Spacewatch	·	650 m	MPC · JPL
574105	2010 CZ_{18}	—	February 12, 2010	Dauban	C. Rinner, Kugel, F.	·	2.8 km	MPC · JPL
574106	2010 CF_{21}	—	December 18, 2009	Kitt Peak	Spacewatch	ADE	1.5 km	MPC · JPL
574107	2010 CL_{22}	—	October 21, 2003	Kitt Peak	Spacewatch	AST	1.9 km	MPC · JPL
574108	2010 CR_{23}	—	January 19, 2010	Tzec Maun	D. Chestnov, A. Novichonok	·	1.3 km	MPC · JPL
574109	2010 CJ_{25}	—	January 7, 2010	Kitt Peak	Spacewatch	HOF	2.1 km	MPC · JPL
574110	2010 CA_{27}	—	September 18, 2003	Kitt Peak	Spacewatch	·	1.8 km	MPC · JPL
574111	2010 CE_{30}	—	September 29, 2008	Kitt Peak	Spacewatch	AGN	990 m	MPC · JPL
574112	2010 CK_{31}	—	February 9, 2010	Mount Lemmon	Mount Lemmon Survey	AGN	890 m	MPC · JPL
574113	2010 CY_{32}	—	September 6, 2008	Kitt Peak	Spacewatch	·	1.3 km	MPC · JPL
574114	2010 CX_{33}	—	January 15, 2010	Kitt Peak	Spacewatch	·	700 m	MPC · JPL
574115	2010 CE_{34}	—	February 10, 2010	Kitt Peak	Spacewatch	·	2.1 km	MPC · JPL
574116	2010 CG_{35}	—	November 16, 2003	Kitt Peak	Spacewatch	·	2.2 km	MPC · JPL
574117	2010 CC_{37}	—	November 6, 2008	Mount Lemmon	Mount Lemmon Survey	T_{j} (2.93) · 3:2	5.2 km	MPC · JPL
574118	2010 CL_{37}	—	October 28, 2008	Mount Lemmon	Mount Lemmon Survey	·	1.6 km	MPC · JPL
574119	2010 CH_{39}	—	August 28, 2003	Palomar	NEAT	·	2.4 km	MPC · JPL
574120	2010 CX_{39}	—	February 13, 2010	Mount Lemmon	Mount Lemmon Survey	·	1.6 km	MPC · JPL
574121	2010 CU_{43}	—	February 9, 2010	Catalina	CSS	·	1.5 km	MPC · JPL
574122	2010 CJ_{58}	—	January 15, 2005	Bareggio	Pozzoli, V.	·	2.6 km	MPC · JPL
574123	2010 CZ_{67}	—	February 10, 2010	Kitt Peak	Spacewatch	·	620 m	MPC · JPL
574124	2010 CK_{68}	—	February 10, 2010	Kitt Peak	Spacewatch	·	800 m	MPC · JPL
574125	2010 CL_{69}	—	January 7, 2010	Kitt Peak	Spacewatch	·	1.5 km	MPC · JPL
574126	2010 CM_{69}	—	January 12, 2010	Mount Lemmon	Mount Lemmon Survey	·	2.1 km	MPC · JPL
574127	2010 CA_{71}	—	February 13, 2010	Mount Lemmon	Mount Lemmon Survey	·	650 m	MPC · JPL
574128	2010 CA_{75}	—	July 19, 2007	Mount Lemmon	Mount Lemmon Survey	·	1.7 km	MPC · JPL
574129	2010 CD_{75}	—	February 13, 2010	Mount Lemmon	Mount Lemmon Survey	·	1.6 km	MPC · JPL
574130	2010 CL_{77}	—	February 13, 2010	Mount Lemmon	Mount Lemmon Survey	HOF	2.2 km	MPC · JPL
574131	2010 CK_{83}	—	September 23, 2008	Kitt Peak	Spacewatch	(2076)	770 m	MPC · JPL
574132	2010 CJ_{89}	—	February 14, 2010	Mount Lemmon	Mount Lemmon Survey	EMA	2.4 km	MPC · JPL
574133	2010 CP_{90}	—	September 21, 2003	Kitt Peak	Spacewatch	HOF	2.7 km	MPC · JPL
574134	2010 CF_{91}	—	October 31, 2008	Mount Lemmon	Mount Lemmon Survey	·	1.8 km	MPC · JPL
574135	2010 CO_{96}	—	September 5, 2008	Kitt Peak	Spacewatch	V	490 m	MPC · JPL
574136	2010 CQ_{97}	—	February 14, 2010	Mount Lemmon	Mount Lemmon Survey	·	1.5 km	MPC · JPL
574137	2010 CQ_{98}	—	February 14, 2010	Mount Lemmon	Mount Lemmon Survey	·	600 m	MPC · JPL
574138	2010 CU_{99}	—	September 26, 2008	Kitt Peak	Spacewatch	AGN	1.2 km	MPC · JPL
574139	2010 CK_{109}	—	February 14, 2010	Mount Lemmon	Mount Lemmon Survey	·	1.5 km	MPC · JPL
574140	2010 CJ_{110}	—	February 14, 2010	Mount Lemmon	Mount Lemmon Survey	AST	1.2 km	MPC · JPL
574141	2010 CG_{111}	—	September 7, 2008	Mount Lemmon	Mount Lemmon Survey	·	1.6 km	MPC · JPL
574142	2010 CP_{116}	—	February 14, 2010	Kitt Peak	Spacewatch	·	650 m	MPC · JPL
574143	2010 CF_{118}	—	February 7, 2006	Kitt Peak	Spacewatch	·	960 m	MPC · JPL
574144	2010 CC_{120}	—	October 22, 2003	Anderson Mesa	LONEOS	·	2.8 km	MPC · JPL
574145	2010 CO_{123}	—	September 10, 2007	Mount Lemmon	Mount Lemmon Survey	·	2.2 km	MPC · JPL
574146	2010 CR_{124}	—	February 15, 2010	Mount Lemmon	Mount Lemmon Survey	·	1.7 km	MPC · JPL
574147	2010 CL_{127}	—	February 15, 2010	Kitt Peak	Spacewatch	·	680 m	MPC · JPL
574148	2010 CH_{138}	—	November 16, 2009	Mount Lemmon	Mount Lemmon Survey	GEF	1.2 km	MPC · JPL
574149	2010 CO_{141}	—	May 24, 2006	Mount Lemmon	Mount Lemmon Survey	KOR	1.3 km	MPC · JPL
574150	2010 CC_{147}	—	February 13, 2010	Mount Lemmon	Mount Lemmon Survey	·	810 m	MPC · JPL
574151	2010 CR_{148}	—	December 20, 2009	Mount Lemmon	Mount Lemmon Survey	·	2.0 km	MPC · JPL
574152	2010 CG_{149}	—	December 2, 2005	Mauna Kea	A. Boattini	·	1.9 km	MPC · JPL
574153	2010 CK_{152}	—	April 26, 2007	Mount Lemmon	Mount Lemmon Survey	·	590 m	MPC · JPL
574154	2010 CM_{154}	—	February 15, 2010	Kitt Peak	Spacewatch	H	450 m	MPC · JPL
574155	2010 CQ_{155}	—	April 19, 2007	Mount Lemmon	Mount Lemmon Survey	·	630 m	MPC · JPL
574156	2010 CS_{158}	—	August 28, 2003	Palomar	NEAT	H	350 m	MPC · JPL
574157	2010 CE_{161}	—	February 13, 2010	Catalina	CSS	·	2.2 km	MPC · JPL
574158	2010 CJ_{162}	—	February 9, 2010	Kitt Peak	Spacewatch	·	2.1 km	MPC · JPL
574159	2010 CR_{166}	—	May 5, 2003	Kitt Peak	Spacewatch	·	940 m	MPC · JPL
574160	2010 CH_{168}	—	February 15, 2010	Kitt Peak	Spacewatch	·	920 m	MPC · JPL
574161	2010 CO_{172}	—	February 5, 2010	Kitt Peak	Spacewatch	H	420 m	MPC · JPL
574162	2010 CV_{172}	—	February 6, 2010	Mount Lemmon	Mount Lemmon Survey	HNS	1.1 km	MPC · JPL
574163	2010 CE_{174}	—	January 7, 2010	Kitt Peak	Spacewatch	·	1.4 km	MPC · JPL
574164	2010 CE_{175}	—	February 9, 2010	Kitt Peak	Spacewatch	AGN	920 m	MPC · JPL
574165	2010 CW_{176}	—	September 29, 2003	Apache Point	SDSS	·	1.8 km	MPC · JPL
574166	2010 CA_{178}	—	February 10, 2010	Kitt Peak	Spacewatch	·	790 m	MPC · JPL
574167	2010 CH_{178}	—	October 30, 2008	Kitt Peak	Spacewatch	·	1.9 km	MPC · JPL
574168	2010 CY_{179}	—	March 25, 2006	Mount Bigelow	CSS	·	2.0 km	MPC · JPL
574169	2010 CA_{248}	—	November 21, 2009	Mount Lemmon	Mount Lemmon Survey	·	820 m	MPC · JPL
574170	2010 CF_{248}	—	February 17, 2010	Kitt Peak	Spacewatch	HNS	1.3 km	MPC · JPL
574171	2010 CM_{249}	—	October 7, 2008	Mount Lemmon	Mount Lemmon Survey	WIT	1.1 km	MPC · JPL
574172	2010 CE_{254}	—	December 2, 2010	Kitt Peak	Spacewatch	·	2.3 km	MPC · JPL
574173	2010 CW_{267}	—	February 16, 2015	Haleakala	Pan-STARRS 1	·	1.1 km	MPC · JPL
574174	2010 CL_{270}	—	October 1, 2017	Haleakala	Pan-STARRS 1	·	1.4 km	MPC · JPL
574175	2010 CO_{270}	—	January 7, 2010	Catalina	CSS	·	1.4 km	MPC · JPL
574176	2010 CC_{272}	—	September 23, 2017	Haleakala	Pan-STARRS 1	·	1.5 km	MPC · JPL
574177	2010 CZ_{274}	—	February 13, 2010	Mount Lemmon	Mount Lemmon Survey	·	1.5 km	MPC · JPL
574178	2010 DC	—	February 16, 2010	Catalina	CSS	H	520 m	MPC · JPL
574179	2010 DJ_{2}	—	February 16, 2010	Mount Lemmon	Mount Lemmon Survey	·	1.4 km	MPC · JPL
574180	2010 DF_{3}	—	September 22, 2008	Kitt Peak	Spacewatch	·	2.1 km	MPC · JPL
574181	2010 DL_{34}	—	September 21, 2008	Catalina	CSS	·	2.3 km	MPC · JPL
574182	2010 DB_{37}	—	February 11, 2000	Kitt Peak	Spacewatch	·	1.9 km	MPC · JPL
574183	2010 DJ_{38}	—	October 31, 2008	Mount Lemmon	Mount Lemmon Survey	·	1.6 km	MPC · JPL
574184	2010 DU_{38}	—	February 16, 2010	Kitt Peak	Spacewatch	·	500 m	MPC · JPL
574185	2010 DS_{47}	—	November 9, 2008	Kitt Peak	Spacewatch	·	1.8 km	MPC · JPL
574186	2010 DT_{54}	—	March 15, 2007	Kitt Peak	Spacewatch	·	620 m	MPC · JPL
574187	2010 DK_{79}	—	February 22, 2003	Palomar	NEAT	·	1.1 km	MPC · JPL
574188	2010 DK_{92}	—	December 19, 2009	Kitt Peak	Spacewatch	·	730 m	MPC · JPL
574189	2010 DU_{93}	—	February 17, 2015	Haleakala	Pan-STARRS 1	·	1.7 km	MPC · JPL
574190	2010 DE_{96}	—	October 6, 2012	Haleakala	Pan-STARRS 1	·	2.1 km	MPC · JPL
574191	2010 DC_{103}	—	December 18, 2009	Mount Lemmon	Mount Lemmon Survey	·	1.5 km	MPC · JPL
574192	2010 DR_{106}	—	February 17, 2010	Kitt Peak	Spacewatch	·	1.7 km	MPC · JPL
574193	2010 DS_{106}	—	February 19, 2015	Haleakala	Pan-STARRS 1	·	1.3 km	MPC · JPL
574194	2010 DT_{107}	—	February 16, 2010	Mount Lemmon	Mount Lemmon Survey	ADE	1.6 km	MPC · JPL
574195	2010 DC_{110}	—	August 19, 2012	Siding Spring	SSS	·	2.1 km	MPC · JPL
574196	2010 DV_{110}	—	February 18, 2010	Kitt Peak	Spacewatch	·	550 m	MPC · JPL
574197	2010 DP_{111}	—	September 30, 2017	Mount Lemmon	Mount Lemmon Survey	·	1.6 km	MPC · JPL
574198	2010 DZ_{111}	—	February 16, 2010	Kitt Peak	Spacewatch	·	1.2 km	MPC · JPL
574199	2010 DB_{112}	—	February 17, 2010	Mount Lemmon	Mount Lemmon Survey	·	510 m	MPC · JPL
574200	2010 DZ_{113}	—	February 17, 2010	Kitt Peak	Spacewatch	EOS	1.1 km	MPC · JPL

== 574201–574300 ==
back to top

Designation			Discovery			Properties		Ref
Permanent	Provisional	Named after	Date	Site	Discoverer(s)	Category	Diam.	Ref
574201	2010 EY_{11}	—	March 4, 2010	Taunus	Karge, S., E. Schwab	·	730 m	MPC · JPL
574202	2010 EH_{33}	—	September 30, 2003	Kitt Peak	Spacewatch	·	2.2 km	MPC · JPL
574203	2010 EZ_{39}	—	December 11, 2004	Socorro	LINEAR	·	2.1 km	MPC · JPL
574204	2010 EV_{66}	—	April 9, 2003	Kitt Peak	Spacewatch	·	710 m	MPC · JPL
574205	2010 EY_{66}	—	October 22, 2003	Kitt Peak	Spacewatch	AGN	1.5 km	MPC · JPL
574206	2010 EB_{68}	—	March 12, 2010	Mount Lemmon	Mount Lemmon Survey	·	670 m	MPC · JPL
574207	2010 EN_{71}	—	March 13, 2010	Mount Lemmon	Mount Lemmon Survey	·	1.6 km	MPC · JPL
574208	2010 ED_{72}	—	March 4, 2005	Mount Lemmon	Mount Lemmon Survey	KOR	1.4 km	MPC · JPL
574209	2010 EE_{74}	—	February 21, 2003	Palomar	NEAT	·	690 m	MPC · JPL
574210	2010 EU_{74}	—	February 16, 2010	Kitt Peak	Spacewatch	·	1.5 km	MPC · JPL
574211	2010 EB_{78}	—	March 12, 2010	Mount Lemmon	Mount Lemmon Survey	KOR	1.2 km	MPC · JPL
574212	2010 ES_{78}	—	March 12, 2010	Mount Lemmon	Mount Lemmon Survey	·	1.7 km	MPC · JPL
574213	2010 ES_{79}	—	March 12, 2010	Mount Lemmon	Mount Lemmon Survey	·	580 m	MPC · JPL
574214	2010 EG_{81}	—	February 19, 2010	Mount Lemmon	Mount Lemmon Survey	·	640 m	MPC · JPL
574215	2010 EJ_{82}	—	October 24, 2003	Kitt Peak	Spacewatch	·	2.2 km	MPC · JPL
574216	2010 EB_{83}	—	March 12, 2010	Mount Lemmon	Mount Lemmon Survey	HOF	2.3 km	MPC · JPL
574217	2010 ED_{84}	—	March 13, 2010	Kitt Peak	Spacewatch	·	740 m	MPC · JPL
574218	2010 EK_{92}	—	October 15, 2001	Apache Point	SDSS	·	730 m	MPC · JPL
574219	2010 EP_{92}	—	March 11, 2005	Mount Lemmon	Mount Lemmon Survey	GEF	1.2 km	MPC · JPL
574220	2010 EP_{94}	—	September 16, 2003	Kitt Peak	Spacewatch	·	3.9 km	MPC · JPL
574221	2010 EC_{101}	—	February 18, 2010	Mount Lemmon	Mount Lemmon Survey	·	490 m	MPC · JPL
574222	2010 EB_{103}	—	March 15, 2010	Mount Lemmon	Mount Lemmon Survey	·	510 m	MPC · JPL
574223	2010 EG_{123}	—	March 24, 2003	Kitt Peak	Spacewatch	·	660 m	MPC · JPL
574224	2010 EC_{129}	—	October 13, 2007	Kitt Peak	Spacewatch	·	2.3 km	MPC · JPL
574225	2010 EP_{129}	—	March 13, 2010	Kitt Peak	Spacewatch	·	580 m	MPC · JPL
574226	2010 EP_{136}	—	March 13, 2010	Mount Lemmon	Mount Lemmon Survey	·	1.5 km	MPC · JPL
574227	2010 EW_{136}	—	February 18, 2010	Mount Lemmon	Mount Lemmon Survey	·	1.4 km	MPC · JPL
574228	2010 EF_{137}	—	March 15, 2010	Kitt Peak	Spacewatch	·	610 m	MPC · JPL
574229	2010 EG_{143}	—	November 26, 2005	Mount Lemmon	Mount Lemmon Survey	·	540 m	MPC · JPL
574230	2010 EY_{182}	—	February 20, 2006	Kitt Peak	Spacewatch	DOR	1.7 km	MPC · JPL
574231	2010 EM_{188}	—	March 13, 2010	Mount Lemmon	Mount Lemmon Survey	(2076)	580 m	MPC · JPL
574232	2010 EN_{190}	—	March 13, 2010	Mount Lemmon	Mount Lemmon Survey	V	490 m	MPC · JPL
574233	2010 FG_{1}	—	March 16, 2010	Mount Lemmon	Mount Lemmon Survey	·	830 m	MPC · JPL
574234	2010 FG_{6}	—	September 16, 2003	Kitt Peak	Spacewatch	HNS	1.4 km	MPC · JPL
574235	2010 FZ_{10}	—	November 30, 2008	Kitt Peak	Spacewatch	KOR	1.5 km	MPC · JPL
574236	2010 FP_{13}	—	March 17, 2010	Kitt Peak	Spacewatch	·	570 m	MPC · JPL
574237	2010 FD_{14}	—	March 17, 2010	Kitt Peak	Spacewatch	V	480 m	MPC · JPL
574238	2010 FV_{14}	—	October 15, 2004	Mount Lemmon	Mount Lemmon Survey	EUN	1.4 km	MPC · JPL
574239	2010 FQ_{16}	—	August 29, 2002	Kitt Peak	Spacewatch	KOR	1.2 km	MPC · JPL
574240	2010 FV_{16}	—	March 18, 2010	Kitt Peak	Spacewatch	KOR	1.2 km	MPC · JPL
574241	2010 FG_{17}	—	February 18, 2010	Kitt Peak	Spacewatch	·	2.1 km	MPC · JPL
574242	2010 FS_{25}	—	March 19, 2010	Mount Lemmon	Mount Lemmon Survey	·	1.3 km	MPC · JPL
574243	2010 FS_{30}	—	March 16, 2010	Kitt Peak	Spacewatch	·	1.4 km	MPC · JPL
574244	2010 FW_{47}	—	September 13, 2007	Mount Lemmon	Mount Lemmon Survey	·	1.6 km	MPC · JPL
574245	2010 FZ_{84}	—	March 21, 2010	Kitt Peak	Spacewatch	·	1.6 km	MPC · JPL
574246	2010 FU_{87}	—	March 18, 2010	Mount Lemmon	Mount Lemmon Survey	MAS	590 m	MPC · JPL
574247	2010 FF_{89}	—	March 18, 2010	Mount Lemmon	Mount Lemmon Survey	·	970 m	MPC · JPL
574248	2010 FC_{94}	—	March 18, 2010	Mount Lemmon	Mount Lemmon Survey	·	1.4 km	MPC · JPL
574249	2010 FV_{96}	—	March 21, 2010	Kitt Peak	Spacewatch	·	2.1 km	MPC · JPL
574250	2010 FG_{99}	—	March 20, 2010	Kitt Peak	Spacewatch	·	1.9 km	MPC · JPL
574251	2010 FJ_{99}	—	February 17, 2010	Mount Lemmon	Mount Lemmon Survey	·	570 m	MPC · JPL
574252	2010 FN_{133}	—	February 23, 2015	Haleakala	Pan-STARRS 1	·	1.3 km	MPC · JPL
574253	2010 FU_{137}	—	December 4, 2013	Haleakala	Pan-STARRS 1	·	1.6 km	MPC · JPL
574254	2010 FC_{138}	—	March 16, 2010	Mount Lemmon	Mount Lemmon Survey	·	740 m	MPC · JPL
574255	2010 FW_{138}	—	March 18, 2010	Kitt Peak	Spacewatch	·	560 m	MPC · JPL
574256	2010 FB_{139}	—	March 18, 2010	Kitt Peak	Spacewatch	·	770 m	MPC · JPL
574257	2010 FJ_{139}	—	June 29, 2014	Haleakala	Pan-STARRS 1	(2076)	570 m	MPC · JPL
574258	2010 FG_{140}	—	July 30, 2017	Haleakala	Pan-STARRS 1	·	1.7 km	MPC · JPL
574259	2010 FH_{140}	—	March 18, 2010	Mount Lemmon	Mount Lemmon Survey	·	1.7 km	MPC · JPL
574260	2010 FH_{141}	—	March 21, 2010	Kitt Peak	Spacewatch	·	2.2 km	MPC · JPL
574261	2010 FS_{141}	—	March 18, 2010	Kitt Peak	Spacewatch	AGN	1.1 km	MPC · JPL
574262	2010 FR_{142}	—	March 18, 2010	Mount Lemmon	Mount Lemmon Survey	·	1.5 km	MPC · JPL
574263	2010 FU_{142}	—	March 20, 2010	Mount Lemmon	Mount Lemmon Survey	3:2	5.0 km	MPC · JPL
574264	2010 GK_{7}	—	March 12, 2010	Kitt Peak	Spacewatch	·	680 m	MPC · JPL
574265	2010 GN_{35}	—	April 10, 2010	Mount Lemmon	Mount Lemmon Survey	·	510 m	MPC · JPL
574266	2010 GQ_{65}	—	January 26, 2001	Kitt Peak	Spacewatch	·	1.5 km	MPC · JPL
574267	2010 GG_{75}	—	November 26, 2005	Kitt Peak	Spacewatch	·	700 m	MPC · JPL
574268	2010 GP_{90}	—	August 5, 2005	Palomar	NEAT	·	3.0 km	MPC · JPL
574269	2010 GO_{95}	—	January 12, 2018	Haleakala	Pan-STARRS 1	L5	8.3 km	MPC · JPL
574270	2010 GD_{100}	—	February 16, 2005	La Silla	A. Boattini	·	2.3 km	MPC · JPL
574271	2010 GA_{103}	—	April 6, 2010	Mount Lemmon	Mount Lemmon Survey	V	510 m	MPC · JPL
574272	2010 GP_{103}	—	April 6, 2010	Kitt Peak	Spacewatch	·	820 m	MPC · JPL
574273	2010 GU_{106}	—	April 8, 2010	Kitt Peak	Spacewatch	·	2.2 km	MPC · JPL
574274	2010 GV_{106}	—	April 8, 2010	Kitt Peak	Spacewatch	·	1.8 km	MPC · JPL
574275	2010 GK_{113}	—	September 5, 2007	Catalina	CSS	·	820 m	MPC · JPL
574276	2010 GL_{117}	—	September 18, 2006	Catalina	CSS	·	2.6 km	MPC · JPL
574277	2010 GD_{124}	—	April 4, 2010	Kitt Peak	Spacewatch	·	490 m	MPC · JPL
574278	2010 GP_{125}	—	April 8, 2010	Kitt Peak	Spacewatch	·	1.1 km	MPC · JPL
574279	2010 GU_{125}	—	October 10, 2007	Kitt Peak	Spacewatch	·	1.7 km	MPC · JPL
574280	2010 GS_{126}	—	October 18, 2007	Kitt Peak	Spacewatch	·	1.6 km	MPC · JPL
574281	2010 GG_{131}	—	January 30, 2004	Kitt Peak	Spacewatch	·	2.2 km	MPC · JPL
574282	2010 GH_{136}	—	April 4, 2010	Kitt Peak	Spacewatch	·	860 m	MPC · JPL
574283	2010 GE_{139}	—	October 12, 2007	Mount Lemmon	Mount Lemmon Survey	EOS	2.1 km	MPC · JPL
574284	2010 GH_{140}	—	October 21, 2007	Mount Lemmon	Mount Lemmon Survey	·	1.9 km	MPC · JPL
574285	2010 GO_{140}	—	April 8, 2010	Kitt Peak	Spacewatch	V	490 m	MPC · JPL
574286	2010 GS_{145}	—	March 24, 2003	Kitt Peak	Spacewatch	·	660 m	MPC · JPL
574287	2010 GZ_{146}	—	April 14, 2010	Mount Lemmon	Mount Lemmon Survey	·	540 m	MPC · JPL
574288	2010 GE_{183}	—	June 9, 2014	Mount Lemmon	Mount Lemmon Survey	PHO	850 m	MPC · JPL
574289	2010 GM_{186}	—	December 23, 2012	Haleakala	Pan-STARRS 1	·	2.5 km	MPC · JPL
574290	2010 GU_{197}	—	March 4, 2006	Kitt Peak	Spacewatch	·	1.6 km	MPC · JPL
574291	2010 GF_{198}	—	September 23, 2008	Kitt Peak	Spacewatch	·	1.6 km	MPC · JPL
574292	2010 GE_{199}	—	February 8, 2013	Haleakala	Pan-STARRS 1	·	710 m	MPC · JPL
574293	2010 GO_{199}	—	October 9, 2015	Haleakala	Pan-STARRS 1	·	670 m	MPC · JPL
574294	2010 GU_{199}	—	April 14, 2010	Mount Lemmon	Mount Lemmon Survey	H	370 m	MPC · JPL
574295	2010 GV_{199}	—	February 23, 2015	Haleakala	Pan-STARRS 1	·	1.6 km	MPC · JPL
574296	2010 GA_{200}	—	April 14, 2010	Mount Lemmon	Mount Lemmon Survey	·	500 m	MPC · JPL
574297	2010 GL_{200}	—	October 11, 2012	Mount Lemmon	Mount Lemmon Survey	·	1.7 km	MPC · JPL
574298	2010 GC_{201}	—	July 3, 2014	Haleakala	Pan-STARRS 1	(2076)	690 m	MPC · JPL
574299	2010 GL_{201}	—	April 15, 2010	Mount Lemmon	Mount Lemmon Survey	H	300 m	MPC · JPL
574300 Curelaru	2010 GX_{202}	Curelaru	July 10, 2014	La Palma	EURONEAR	·	600 m	MPC · JPL

== 574301–574400 ==
back to top

Designation			Discovery			Properties		Ref
Permanent	Provisional	Named after	Date	Site	Discoverer(s)	Category	Diam.	Ref
574301	2010 GW_{203}	—	December 12, 2015	Haleakala	Pan-STARRS 1	·	630 m	MPC · JPL
574302	2010 GY_{204}	—	April 12, 2010	Mount Lemmon	Mount Lemmon Survey	·	1.2 km	MPC · JPL
574303	2010 GN_{206}	—	April 10, 2010	Kitt Peak	Spacewatch	·	610 m	MPC · JPL
574304	2010 GP_{206}	—	April 10, 2010	Mount Lemmon	Mount Lemmon Survey	·	630 m	MPC · JPL
574305	2010 GA_{207}	—	April 9, 2010	Mount Lemmon	Mount Lemmon Survey	·	1.5 km	MPC · JPL
574306	2010 GQ_{207}	—	April 10, 2010	Mount Lemmon	Mount Lemmon Survey	·	1.3 km	MPC · JPL
574307	2010 HD_{5}	—	April 16, 2010	WISE	WISE	·	2.5 km	MPC · JPL
574308	2010 HG_{38}	—	December 1, 2006	Mount Lemmon	Mount Lemmon Survey	·	3.4 km	MPC · JPL
574309	2010 HL_{105}	—	September 27, 2006	Kitt Peak	Spacewatch	·	2.1 km	MPC · JPL
574310	2010 HW_{106}	—	May 8, 2005	Mount Lemmon	Mount Lemmon Survey	EOS	1.7 km	MPC · JPL
574311	2010 HD_{108}	—	November 7, 2008	Mount Lemmon	Mount Lemmon Survey	·	650 m	MPC · JPL
574312	2010 HB_{115}	—	April 16, 2010	WISE	WISE	·	890 m	MPC · JPL
574313	2010 HL_{121}	—	April 25, 2015	Haleakala	Pan-STARRS 1	·	2.2 km	MPC · JPL
574314	2010 HL_{122}	—	July 7, 2016	Mount Lemmon	Mount Lemmon Survey	·	2.5 km	MPC · JPL
574315	2010 HP_{125}	—	April 1, 2009	Kitt Peak	Spacewatch	·	2.0 km	MPC · JPL
574316	2010 HS_{128}	—	July 14, 2016	Haleakala	Pan-STARRS 1	·	2.3 km	MPC · JPL
574317	2010 HB_{131}	—	September 24, 1995	Kitt Peak	Spacewatch	ADE	1.9 km	MPC · JPL
574318	2010 HZ_{134}	—	May 14, 2009	Kitt Peak	Spacewatch	·	3.0 km	MPC · JPL
574319	2010 HY_{135}	—	May 6, 2011	Mount Lemmon	Mount Lemmon Survey	·	1.9 km	MPC · JPL
574320	2010 HV_{138}	—	November 1, 2007	Kitt Peak	Spacewatch	·	1.6 km	MPC · JPL
574321	2010 HG_{139}	—	April 20, 2010	Mount Lemmon	Mount Lemmon Survey	·	1.4 km	MPC · JPL
574322	2010 HJ_{139}	—	March 29, 2015	Haleakala	Pan-STARRS 1	·	1.7 km	MPC · JPL
574323	2010 HR_{139}	—	February 17, 2015	Haleakala	Pan-STARRS 1	EOS	1.6 km	MPC · JPL
574324	2010 JQ_{1}	—	May 4, 2010	Nogales	M. Schwartz, P. R. Holvorcem	·	1.1 km	MPC · JPL
574325	2010 JC_{30}	—	May 3, 2010	Kitt Peak	Spacewatch	·	1.6 km	MPC · JPL
574326	2010 JM_{30}	—	May 3, 2010	Kitt Peak	Spacewatch	·	1.9 km	MPC · JPL
574327	2010 JX_{30}	—	October 30, 2007	Kitt Peak	Spacewatch	KOR	1.2 km	MPC · JPL
574328	2010 JH_{32}	—	May 6, 2010	Mount Lemmon	Mount Lemmon Survey	·	2.1 km	MPC · JPL
574329	2010 JN_{32}	—	August 21, 2001	Cerro Tololo	Deep Ecliptic Survey	·	1.3 km	MPC · JPL
574330	2010 JY_{35}	—	May 5, 2010	Mount Lemmon	Mount Lemmon Survey	·	600 m	MPC · JPL
574331	2010 JV_{36}	—	May 6, 2010	Mount Lemmon	Mount Lemmon Survey	·	1.3 km	MPC · JPL
574332	2010 JZ_{36}	—	December 29, 2008	Bergisch Gladbach	W. Bickel	·	2.1 km	MPC · JPL
574333	2010 JZ_{44}	—	May 7, 2010	Kitt Peak	Spacewatch	·	3.1 km	MPC · JPL
574334	2010 JM_{45}	—	May 7, 2010	Kitt Peak	Spacewatch	·	1.4 km	MPC · JPL
574335	2010 JN_{46}	—	May 7, 2010	Kitt Peak	Spacewatch	EUN	850 m	MPC · JPL
574336	2010 JQ_{46}	—	May 8, 2010	LightBuckets	T. Vorobjov	·	1.0 km	MPC · JPL
574337	2010 JU_{46}	—	April 12, 2010	Mount Lemmon	Mount Lemmon Survey	JUN	740 m	MPC · JPL
574338	2010 JY_{46}	—	May 9, 2010	Mount Lemmon	Mount Lemmon Survey	·	620 m	MPC · JPL
574339	2010 JP_{73}	—	April 8, 2010	Kitt Peak	Spacewatch	·	760 m	MPC · JPL
574340	2010 JT_{76}	—	December 30, 2008	Kitt Peak	Spacewatch	·	1.7 km	MPC · JPL
574341	2010 JJ_{78}	—	May 11, 2010	Mount Lemmon	Mount Lemmon Survey	NYS	680 m	MPC · JPL
574342	2010 JE_{79}	—	September 16, 2006	Kitt Peak	Spacewatch	EOS	1.5 km	MPC · JPL
574343	2010 JF_{79}	—	January 30, 2006	Flagstaff	Wasserman, L. H.	·	980 m	MPC · JPL
574344	2010 JL_{111}	—	May 11, 2010	Mount Lemmon	Mount Lemmon Survey	·	3.6 km	MPC · JPL
574345	2010 JE_{112}	—	May 12, 2010	Kitt Peak	Spacewatch	V	590 m	MPC · JPL
574346	2010 JJ_{112}	—	May 12, 2010	Kitt Peak	Spacewatch	·	1.7 km	MPC · JPL
574347	2010 JS_{112}	—	July 18, 2007	Mount Lemmon	Mount Lemmon Survey	·	640 m	MPC · JPL
574348	2010 JN_{113}	—	May 7, 2010	Mount Lemmon	Mount Lemmon Survey	·	970 m	MPC · JPL
574349	2010 JK_{118}	—	May 10, 2010	Mount Lemmon	Mount Lemmon Survey	H	410 m	MPC · JPL
574350	2010 JW_{118}	—	May 7, 2005	Mount Lemmon	Mount Lemmon Survey	KOR	1.4 km	MPC · JPL
574351	2010 JC_{119}	—	November 3, 2007	Kitt Peak	Spacewatch	·	1.8 km	MPC · JPL
574352	2010 JW_{119}	—	March 19, 2010	Mount Lemmon	Mount Lemmon Survey	·	2.1 km	MPC · JPL
574353	2010 JH_{120}	—	August 29, 2006	Kitt Peak	Spacewatch	EOS	1.8 km	MPC · JPL
574354	2010 JE_{121}	—	May 12, 2010	Mount Lemmon	Mount Lemmon Survey	·	900 m	MPC · JPL
574355	2010 JS_{122}	—	May 13, 2010	Kitt Peak	Spacewatch	·	790 m	MPC · JPL
574356	2010 JV_{155}	—	April 9, 2010	Kitt Peak	Spacewatch	NYS	670 m	MPC · JPL
574357	2010 JT_{156}	—	May 11, 2010	Mount Lemmon	Mount Lemmon Survey	·	2.7 km	MPC · JPL
574358	2010 JA_{157}	—	May 11, 2010	Mount Lemmon	Mount Lemmon Survey	·	820 m	MPC · JPL
574359	2010 JG_{157}	—	May 11, 2010	Kitt Peak	Spacewatch	·	2.1 km	MPC · JPL
574360	2010 JP_{157}	—	May 12, 2010	Mount Lemmon	Mount Lemmon Survey	·	2.7 km	MPC · JPL
574361	2010 JP_{158}	—	May 14, 2010	Mount Lemmon	Mount Lemmon Survey	·	1.3 km	MPC · JPL
574362	2010 JT_{160}	—	May 5, 2010	Mount Lemmon	Mount Lemmon Survey	EOS	1.4 km	MPC · JPL
574363	2010 JS_{167}	—	May 11, 2010	Mount Lemmon	Mount Lemmon Survey	·	1.7 km	MPC · JPL
574364	2010 JL_{168}	—	September 19, 1998	Apache Point	SDSS Collaboration	WIT	840 m	MPC · JPL
574365	2010 JD_{169}	—	December 4, 2007	Mount Lemmon	Mount Lemmon Survey	·	2.2 km	MPC · JPL
574366	2010 JH_{169}	—	March 19, 2010	Kitt Peak	Spacewatch	·	760 m	MPC · JPL
574367	2010 JW_{171}	—	May 6, 2010	Kitt Peak	Spacewatch	·	670 m	MPC · JPL
574368	2010 JT_{173}	—	April 16, 2005	Kitt Peak	Spacewatch	·	2.1 km	MPC · JPL
574369	2010 JA_{174}	—	May 9, 2010	Mount Lemmon	Mount Lemmon Survey	V	460 m	MPC · JPL
574370	2010 JO_{175}	—	May 12, 2010	Mount Lemmon	Mount Lemmon Survey	TIR	2.3 km	MPC · JPL
574371	2010 JC_{178}	—	October 1, 2011	Mount Lemmon	Mount Lemmon Survey	·	1.1 km	MPC · JPL
574372	2010 JO_{179}	—	May 10, 2010	Haleakala	Pan-STARRS 1	SDO	647 km	MPC · JPL
574373	2010 JR_{188}	—	December 4, 2013	Haleakala	Pan-STARRS 1	·	1.9 km	MPC · JPL
574374	2010 JA_{200}	—	August 5, 2010	Socorro	LINEAR	·	2.5 km	MPC · JPL
574375	2010 JU_{202}	—	October 23, 2008	Kitt Peak	Spacewatch	·	1.8 km	MPC · JPL
574376	2010 JZ_{207}	—	September 29, 2005	Kitt Peak	Spacewatch	·	2.1 km	MPC · JPL
574377	2010 JK_{210}	—	October 23, 2012	Mount Lemmon	Mount Lemmon Survey	EOS	1.6 km	MPC · JPL
574378	2010 JA_{211}	—	December 17, 2012	Nogales	M. Schwartz, P. R. Holvorcem	PHO	1.2 km	MPC · JPL
574379	2010 JD_{212}	—	January 14, 2015	Haleakala	Pan-STARRS 1	H	420 m	MPC · JPL
574380	2010 JO_{214}	—	April 25, 2015	Haleakala	Pan-STARRS 1	KOR	1.1 km	MPC · JPL
574381	2010 KM_{9}	—	November 22, 2006	Kitt Peak	Spacewatch	·	2.6 km	MPC · JPL
574382	2010 KA_{38}	—	May 17, 2010	Kitt Peak	Spacewatch	·	1.3 km	MPC · JPL
574383	2010 KM_{38}	—	May 17, 2010	Kitt Peak	Spacewatch	·	1.7 km	MPC · JPL
574384	2010 KS_{127}	—	April 17, 2005	Kitt Peak	Spacewatch	·	2.1 km	MPC · JPL
574385	2010 KJ_{130}	—	September 17, 2006	Kitt Peak	Spacewatch	·	2.1 km	MPC · JPL
574386	2010 KM_{130}	—	May 11, 2010	Mount Lemmon	Mount Lemmon Survey	V	590 m	MPC · JPL
574387	2010 KZ_{131}	—	February 26, 2014	Haleakala	Pan-STARRS 1	EOS	1.5 km	MPC · JPL
574388	2010 KB_{132}	—	October 9, 2016	Haleakala	Pan-STARRS 1	·	2.6 km	MPC · JPL
574389	2010 KJ_{145}	—	April 19, 2009	Kitt Peak	Spacewatch	LIX	2.8 km	MPC · JPL
574390	2010 KU_{147}	—	June 18, 2015	Mount Lemmon	Mount Lemmon Survey	·	2.3 km	MPC · JPL
574391	2010 KR_{156}	—	October 23, 2001	Palomar	NEAT	·	2.2 km	MPC · JPL
574392	2010 KS_{156}	—	May 18, 2010	Siding Spring	SSS	·	810 m	MPC · JPL
574393	2010 KU_{158}	—	May 17, 2010	Mount Lemmon	Mount Lemmon Survey	·	1.6 km	MPC · JPL
574394	2010 KO_{159}	—	May 16, 2010	Mount Lemmon	Mount Lemmon Survey	·	970 m	MPC · JPL
574395	2010 KQ_{159}	—	May 21, 2010	Mount Lemmon	Mount Lemmon Survey	·	2.9 km	MPC · JPL
574396	2010 KS_{159}	—	May 16, 2010	Kitt Peak	Spacewatch	·	2.2 km	MPC · JPL
574397	2010 LD_{16}	—	June 3, 2010	Nogales	M. Schwartz, P. R. Holvorcem	·	1.0 km	MPC · JPL
574398	2010 LO_{33}	—	May 20, 2010	Mount Lemmon	Mount Lemmon Survey	centaur	100 km	MPC · JPL
574399	2010 LN_{34}	—	May 29, 2003	Apache Point	SDSS Collaboration	·	1.1 km	MPC · JPL
574400	2010 LR_{60}	—	October 20, 2006	Mount Lemmon	Mount Lemmon Survey	·	1.6 km	MPC · JPL

== 574401–574500 ==
back to top

Designation			Discovery			Properties		Ref
Permanent	Provisional	Named after	Date	Site	Discoverer(s)	Category	Diam.	Ref
574401	2010 LW_{65}	—	May 6, 2010	Kitt Peak	Spacewatch	PHO	810 m	MPC · JPL
574402	2010 LN_{104}	—	July 6, 2005	Siding Spring	SSS	·	3.3 km	MPC · JPL
574403	2010 LC_{105}	—	May 11, 2010	Mount Lemmon	Mount Lemmon Survey	BRA	1.5 km	MPC · JPL
574404	2010 LR_{105}	—	April 17, 2010	Kitt Peak	Spacewatch	·	1.9 km	MPC · JPL
574405	2010 LE_{106}	—	June 14, 2010	Mount Lemmon	Mount Lemmon Survey	·	1.3 km	MPC · JPL
574406	2010 LB_{107}	—	May 11, 2010	Mount Lemmon	Mount Lemmon Survey	TEL	1.3 km	MPC · JPL
574407	2010 LR_{110}	—	June 13, 2010	Mount Lemmon	Mount Lemmon Survey	·	2.2 km	MPC · JPL
574408	2010 LM_{112}	—	June 13, 2010	Mount Lemmon	Mount Lemmon Survey	·	2.3 km	MPC · JPL
574409	2010 LJ_{134}	—	June 12, 2010	Nogales	M. Schwartz, P. R. Holvorcem	·	2.6 km	MPC · JPL
574410	2010 LH_{138}	—	June 21, 2007	Kitt Peak	Spacewatch	·	740 m	MPC · JPL
574411	2010 LB_{139}	—	February 16, 2010	Kitt Peak	Spacewatch	·	650 m	MPC · JPL
574412	2010 LT_{143}	—	September 6, 2016	Mount Lemmon	Mount Lemmon Survey	·	2.5 km	MPC · JPL
574413	2010 LQ_{153}	—	March 18, 2010	Mount Lemmon	Mount Lemmon Survey	·	1.3 km	MPC · JPL
574414	2010 LR_{156}	—	November 5, 2016	Haleakala	Pan-STARRS 1	·	1.2 km	MPC · JPL
574415	2010 LE_{158}	—	June 15, 2010	Mount Lemmon	Mount Lemmon Survey	·	690 m	MPC · JPL
574416	2010 LM_{158}	—	November 26, 2014	Haleakala	Pan-STARRS 1	·	740 m	MPC · JPL
574417	2010 LH_{159}	—	June 14, 2010	Mount Lemmon	Mount Lemmon Survey	·	920 m	MPC · JPL
574418	2010 ML_{4}	—	March 26, 2009	Kitt Peak	Spacewatch	EOS	1.9 km	MPC · JPL
574419	2010 MM_{4}	—	June 21, 2010	Mount Lemmon	Mount Lemmon Survey	·	1.1 km	MPC · JPL
574420	2010 MX_{113}	—	January 13, 2008	Kitt Peak	Spacewatch	·	2.9 km	MPC · JPL
574421	2010 MP_{116}	—	June 16, 2010	Mount Lemmon	Mount Lemmon Survey	·	2.5 km	MPC · JPL
574422	2010 MV_{121}	—	August 10, 2016	Haleakala	Pan-STARRS 1	ELF	2.9 km	MPC · JPL
574423	2010 MZ_{129}	—	September 13, 2007	Kitt Peak	Spacewatch	·	1.8 km	MPC · JPL
574424	2010 MQ_{139}	—	October 4, 2016	Mount Lemmon	Mount Lemmon Survey	·	2.5 km	MPC · JPL
574425	2010 MK_{146}	—	July 28, 2015	Haleakala	Pan-STARRS 1	·	3.8 km	MPC · JPL
574426	2010 MY_{146}	—	December 30, 2011	Kitt Peak	Spacewatch	·	940 m	MPC · JPL
574427	2010 ML_{148}	—	November 30, 2011	Kitt Peak	Spacewatch	H	380 m	MPC · JPL
574428	2010 MN_{148}	—	June 19, 2010	Mount Lemmon	Mount Lemmon Survey	L5	7.4 km	MPC · JPL
574429	2010 MU_{148}	—	June 16, 2010	Mount Lemmon	Mount Lemmon Survey	EUN	1.0 km	MPC · JPL
574430	2010 MP_{149}	—	August 2, 2011	Haleakala	Pan-STARRS 1	·	2.7 km	MPC · JPL
574431	2010 NL_{4}	—	October 19, 2003	Palomar	NEAT	V	640 m	MPC · JPL
574432	2010 NC_{126}	—	March 7, 2013	Mount Lemmon	Mount Lemmon Survey	·	1.5 km	MPC · JPL
574433	2010 NN_{128}	—	January 18, 2013	Mount Lemmon	Mount Lemmon Survey	3:2	4.9 km	MPC · JPL
574434	2010 NK_{147}	—	February 26, 2014	Mount Lemmon	Mount Lemmon Survey	EMA	2.5 km	MPC · JPL
574435	2010 OG_{100}	—	July 20, 2010	Cerro Burek	Burek, Cerro	H	470 m	MPC · JPL
574436	2010 OO_{129}	—	December 26, 2006	Kitt Peak	Spacewatch	·	2.4 km	MPC · JPL
574437	2010 OZ_{135}	—	February 7, 2013	Kitt Peak	Spacewatch	·	2.0 km	MPC · JPL
574438	2010 ON_{136}	—	November 17, 2011	Mount Lemmon	Mount Lemmon Survey	·	3.5 km	MPC · JPL
574439	2010 OK_{141}	—	September 14, 2010	Mount Lemmon	Mount Lemmon Survey	·	1.9 km	MPC · JPL
574440	2010 OY_{141}	—	January 28, 2015	Haleakala	Pan-STARRS 1	·	1.8 km	MPC · JPL
574441	2010 OE_{153}	—	July 19, 2010	Haleakala	Pan-STARRS 1	SDO	339 km	MPC · JPL
574442	2010 ON_{153}	—	July 16, 2010	Charleston	R. Holmes	·	2.2 km	MPC · JPL
574443	2010 PR	—	July 6, 2010	Mount Lemmon	Mount Lemmon Survey	·	950 m	MPC · JPL
574444	2010 PU_{9}	—	September 20, 2003	Kitt Peak	Spacewatch	·	1.1 km	MPC · JPL
574445	2010 PL_{24}	—	December 30, 2007	Mount Lemmon	Mount Lemmon Survey	·	3.4 km	MPC · JPL
574446	2010 PX_{58}	—	August 13, 2010	Mayhill-ISON	L. Elenin	·	2.2 km	MPC · JPL
574447	2010 PL_{60}	—	February 26, 2008	Mount Lemmon	Mount Lemmon Survey	VER	2.2 km	MPC · JPL
574448	2010 PM_{64}	—	August 10, 2010	Kitt Peak	Spacewatch	EOS	1.8 km	MPC · JPL
574449	2010 PT_{73}	—	August 7, 2010	XuYi	PMO NEO Survey Program	·	3.2 km	MPC · JPL
574450	2010 PD_{76}	—	August 7, 2001	Haleakala	NEAT	·	1.5 km	MPC · JPL
574451	2010 PG_{77}	—	August 14, 2010	Kitt Peak	Spacewatch	PHO	880 m	MPC · JPL
574452	2010 PF_{79}	—	January 25, 2009	Kitt Peak	Spacewatch	·	1.0 km	MPC · JPL
574453	2010 PF_{90}	—	August 13, 2010	Kitt Peak	Spacewatch	·	1.9 km	MPC · JPL
574454	2010 PM_{90}	—	August 12, 2010	Kitt Peak	Spacewatch	·	2.4 km	MPC · JPL
574455	2010 PO_{90}	—	August 10, 2010	Kitt Peak	Spacewatch	·	450 m	MPC · JPL
574456	2010 QD_{7}	—	September 16, 2010	Catalina	CSS	·	1.1 km	MPC · JPL
574457	2010 QE_{7}	—	September 17, 2010	Catalina	CSS	·	3.7 km	MPC · JPL
574458	2010 QJ_{7}	—	October 13, 2010	Mount Lemmon	Mount Lemmon Survey	V	540 m	MPC · JPL
574459	2010 QT_{7}	—	August 16, 2010	Charleston	R. Holmes	·	2.8 km	MPC · JPL
574460	2010 QY_{7}	—	August 19, 2010	Kitt Peak	Spacewatch	·	580 m	MPC · JPL
574461	2010 RL_{1}	—	March 11, 2005	Mount Lemmon	Mount Lemmon Survey	·	870 m	MPC · JPL
574462	2010 RC_{4}	—	December 23, 2006	Mount Lemmon	Mount Lemmon Survey	·	3.3 km	MPC · JPL
574463	2010 RW_{4}	—	September 1, 2010	ESA OGS	ESA OGS	·	2.3 km	MPC · JPL
574464	2010 RB_{5}	—	September 2, 2010	Mount Lemmon	Mount Lemmon Survey	·	2.5 km	MPC · JPL
574465	2010 RL_{8}	—	September 2, 2010	Mount Lemmon	Mount Lemmon Survey	HOF	1.8 km	MPC · JPL
574466	2010 RG_{19}	—	September 3, 2010	Socorro	LINEAR	TIR	2.3 km	MPC · JPL
574467	2010 RM_{21}	—	September 3, 2010	Mount Lemmon	Mount Lemmon Survey	·	2.9 km	MPC · JPL
574468	2010 RV_{22}	—	September 3, 2010	Mount Lemmon	Mount Lemmon Survey	·	3.0 km	MPC · JPL
574469	2010 RJ_{23}	—	September 3, 2010	Mount Lemmon	Mount Lemmon Survey	EOS	1.6 km	MPC · JPL
574470	2010 RE_{27}	—	January 16, 2005	Kitt Peak	Spacewatch	·	1.0 km	MPC · JPL
574471	2010 RS_{33}	—	September 1, 2010	Mount Lemmon	Mount Lemmon Survey	·	2.3 km	MPC · JPL
574472	2010 RA_{37}	—	September 2, 2010	Mount Lemmon	Mount Lemmon Survey	·	1.0 km	MPC · JPL
574473	2010 RK_{38}	—	September 5, 2010	Mount Lemmon	Mount Lemmon Survey	·	1.0 km	MPC · JPL
574474	2010 RH_{39}	—	September 4, 2010	Rehoboth	L. A. Molnar, A. Vanden Heuvel	TIR	3.5 km	MPC · JPL
574475	2010 RD_{41}	—	September 5, 2010	Bergisch Gladbach	W. Bickel	H	380 m	MPC · JPL
574476	2010 RD_{43}	—	September 5, 2010	Mount Lemmon	Mount Lemmon Survey	TIR	2.7 km	MPC · JPL
574477	2010 RE_{43}	—	September 25, 2005	Kitt Peak	Spacewatch	·	2.0 km	MPC · JPL
574478	2010 RS_{43}	—	August 9, 2010	Dauban	C. Rinner, Kugel, F.	·	1.1 km	MPC · JPL
574479	2010 RB_{44}	—	May 3, 2008	Mount Lemmon	Mount Lemmon Survey	VER	3.0 km	MPC · JPL
574480	2010 RX_{44}	—	September 2, 2010	Mount Lemmon	Mount Lemmon Survey	·	970 m	MPC · JPL
574481	2010 RB_{45}	—	September 3, 2010	Mount Lemmon	Mount Lemmon Survey	·	3.5 km	MPC · JPL
574482	2010 RD_{47}	—	July 16, 2004	Cerro Tololo	Deep Ecliptic Survey	·	2.6 km	MPC · JPL
574483	2010 RG_{47}	—	September 4, 2010	Kitt Peak	Spacewatch	·	2.5 km	MPC · JPL
574484	2010 RV_{50}	—	September 4, 2010	Kitt Peak	Spacewatch	·	1.1 km	MPC · JPL
574485	2010 RM_{52}	—	September 5, 2010	Mount Lemmon	Mount Lemmon Survey	NYS	940 m	MPC · JPL
574486	2010 RU_{54}	—	September 23, 2005	Kitt Peak	Spacewatch	·	1.5 km	MPC · JPL
574487	2010 RD_{55}	—	September 5, 2010	Mount Lemmon	Mount Lemmon Survey	·	1.5 km	MPC · JPL
574488	2010 RL_{65}	—	September 29, 1999	Catalina	CSS	TIR	3.2 km	MPC · JPL
574489	2010 RC_{70}	—	September 22, 1995	Kitt Peak	Spacewatch	·	1.1 km	MPC · JPL
574490	2010 RS_{73}	—	September 2, 2010	Mount Lemmon	Mount Lemmon Survey	·	1.2 km	MPC · JPL
574491	2010 RS_{75}	—	September 21, 2003	Kitt Peak	Spacewatch	·	1.7 km	MPC · JPL
574492	2010 RZ_{76}	—	September 11, 2010	Mount Lemmon	Mount Lemmon Survey	·	1.1 km	MPC · JPL
574493	2010 RT_{81}	—	September 2, 2010	Mount Lemmon	Mount Lemmon Survey	·	2.4 km	MPC · JPL
574494	2010 RX_{83}	—	September 2, 2010	Mount Lemmon	Mount Lemmon Survey	MAS	690 m	MPC · JPL
574495	2010 RE_{84}	—	August 12, 2010	Kitt Peak	Spacewatch	MAS	610 m	MPC · JPL
574496	2010 RT_{85}	—	August 10, 2010	Kitt Peak	Spacewatch	·	2.6 km	MPC · JPL
574497	2010 RG_{86}	—	November 6, 2005	Kitt Peak	Spacewatch	HYG	2.8 km	MPC · JPL
574498	2010 RN_{88}	—	September 4, 2010	Mount Lemmon	Mount Lemmon Survey	·	2.5 km	MPC · JPL
574499	2010 RH_{89}	—	October 12, 1999	Kitt Peak	Spacewatch	·	2.9 km	MPC · JPL
574500	2010 RU_{89}	—	September 11, 2010	Mount Lemmon	Mount Lemmon Survey	·	2.5 km	MPC · JPL

== 574501–574600 ==
back to top

Designation			Discovery			Properties		Ref
Permanent	Provisional	Named after	Date	Site	Discoverer(s)	Category	Diam.	Ref
574501	2010 RZ_{89}	—	February 20, 2002	Kitt Peak	Spacewatch	·	2.2 km	MPC · JPL
574502	2010 RR_{90}	—	September 6, 2010	La Sagra	OAM	NYS	1.3 km	MPC · JPL
574503	2010 RU_{90}	—	September 10, 2010	Dauban	C. Rinner, Kugel, F.	·	2.6 km	MPC · JPL
574504	2010 RW_{93}	—	February 8, 2008	Kitt Peak	Spacewatch	·	2.8 km	MPC · JPL
574505	2010 RO_{96}	—	March 19, 2009	Mount Lemmon	Mount Lemmon Survey	·	1.3 km	MPC · JPL
574506 Sopronilíceum	2010 RF_{97}	Sopronilíceum	August 8, 2004	Piszkéstető	K. Sárneczky, T. Szalai	·	2.9 km	MPC · JPL
574507	2010 RC_{101}	—	August 23, 2004	Kitt Peak	Spacewatch	HYG	2.1 km	MPC · JPL
574508	2010 RS_{108}	—	September 11, 2010	Kitt Peak	Spacewatch	·	1.2 km	MPC · JPL
574509	2010 RQ_{109}	—	September 9, 2010	Bisei	BATTeRS	·	1.4 km	MPC · JPL
574510	2010 RR_{109}	—	September 11, 2010	Catalina	CSS	H	590 m	MPC · JPL
574511	2010 RA_{110}	—	September 14, 2010	La Sagra	OAM	MAS	680 m	MPC · JPL
574512	2010 RB_{110}	—	September 14, 2010	Plana	Fratev, F.	·	1.1 km	MPC · JPL
574513	2010 RP_{112}	—	September 11, 2010	Kitt Peak	Spacewatch	EOS	1.3 km	MPC · JPL
574514	2010 RG_{114}	—	September 11, 2010	Kitt Peak	Spacewatch	·	2.9 km	MPC · JPL
574515	2010 RP_{117}	—	September 11, 2010	Kitt Peak	Spacewatch	·	2.4 km	MPC · JPL
574516	2010 RU_{119}	—	September 14, 2010	Mount Lemmon	Mount Lemmon Survey	·	2.8 km	MPC · JPL
574517	2010 RK_{123}	—	September 9, 2010	Kitt Peak	Spacewatch	H	440 m	MPC · JPL
574518	2010 RT_{123}	—	October 1, 2003	Kitt Peak	Spacewatch	·	540 m	MPC · JPL
574519	2010 RF_{124}	—	September 11, 2010	Mount Lemmon	Mount Lemmon Survey	·	1.1 km	MPC · JPL
574520	2010 RL_{124}	—	September 11, 2010	Kitt Peak	Spacewatch	·	1.1 km	MPC · JPL
574521	2010 RL_{127}	—	September 12, 2010	Kitt Peak	Spacewatch	·	1.0 km	MPC · JPL
574522	2010 RK_{128}	—	August 12, 2004	Palomar	NEAT	·	3.4 km	MPC · JPL
574523	2010 RD_{131}	—	December 5, 2007	Kitt Peak	Spacewatch	·	930 m	MPC · JPL
574524	2010 RS_{131}	—	September 13, 2010	Andrushivka	Kyrylenko, P., Y. Ivaščenko	TIR	3.0 km	MPC · JPL
574525	2010 RG_{133}	—	December 27, 2006	Mount Lemmon	Mount Lemmon Survey	·	2.7 km	MPC · JPL
574526	2010 RX_{137}	—	September 10, 2010	Mount Lemmon	Mount Lemmon Survey	·	2.6 km	MPC · JPL
574527	2010 RP_{141}	—	September 14, 2010	Kitt Peak	Spacewatch	·	3.3 km	MPC · JPL
574528	2010 RU_{142}	—	November 26, 2005	Mount Lemmon	Mount Lemmon Survey	·	2.6 km	MPC · JPL
574529	2010 RV_{147}	—	September 14, 2010	Mount Lemmon	Mount Lemmon Survey	·	3.0 km	MPC · JPL
574530	2010 RZ_{147}	—	September 15, 2010	Plana	Fratev, F.	·	2.5 km	MPC · JPL
574531	2010 RT_{148}	—	March 18, 2002	Kitt Peak	Deep Ecliptic Survey	EOS	1.6 km	MPC · JPL
574532	2010 RB_{150}	—	July 16, 2004	Cerro Tololo	Deep Ecliptic Survey	·	3.5 km	MPC · JPL
574533	2010 RR_{151}	—	September 15, 2010	Kitt Peak	Spacewatch	·	3.1 km	MPC · JPL
574534	2010 RT_{156}	—	March 11, 2005	Mount Lemmon	Mount Lemmon Survey	·	1.2 km	MPC · JPL
574535	2010 RA_{157}	—	October 25, 2005	Mount Lemmon	Mount Lemmon Survey	HYG	2.4 km	MPC · JPL
574536	2010 RK_{158}	—	October 17, 2003	Kitt Peak	Spacewatch	V	730 m	MPC · JPL
574537	2010 RF_{159}	—	October 3, 2003	Kitt Peak	Spacewatch	V	690 m	MPC · JPL
574538	2010 RP_{160}	—	June 15, 2010	Mount Lemmon	Mount Lemmon Survey	·	2.3 km	MPC · JPL
574539	2010 RK_{161}	—	September 3, 2010	Mount Lemmon	Mount Lemmon Survey	·	3.1 km	MPC · JPL
574540	2010 RX_{161}	—	September 4, 2010	Mount Lemmon	Mount Lemmon Survey	·	2.2 km	MPC · JPL
574541	2010 RZ_{161}	—	September 4, 2010	Mount Lemmon	Mount Lemmon Survey	·	1.3 km	MPC · JPL
574542	2010 RP_{166}	—	April 23, 2009	Kitt Peak	Spacewatch	TIR	2.0 km	MPC · JPL
574543	2010 RE_{170}	—	June 21, 2010	Mount Lemmon	Mount Lemmon Survey	·	3.5 km	MPC · JPL
574544	2010 RP_{171}	—	March 12, 2005	Mount Lemmon	Mount Lemmon Survey	NYS	1.1 km	MPC · JPL
574545	2010 RV_{178}	—	September 2, 2010	Mount Lemmon	Mount Lemmon Survey	·	2.5 km	MPC · JPL
574546 Kondorgusztáv	2010 RP_{180}	Kondorgusztáv	September 6, 2010	Piszkéstető	K. Sárneczky, Z. Kuli	·	1.0 km	MPC · JPL
574547	2010 RX_{182}	—	January 27, 2007	Kitt Peak	Spacewatch	·	3.5 km	MPC · JPL
574548 Plume	2010 RQ_{183}	Plume	April 7, 2007	Mauna Kea	D. D. Balam, K. M. Perrett	·	3.2 km	MPC · JPL
574549	2010 RB_{184}	—	November 25, 2011	Haleakala	Pan-STARRS 1	EOS	2.4 km	MPC · JPL
574550	2010 RE_{184}	—	November 12, 2005	Kitt Peak	Spacewatch	·	2.6 km	MPC · JPL
574551	2010 RK_{184}	—	December 6, 2011	Haleakala	Pan-STARRS 1	·	3.4 km	MPC · JPL
574552	2010 RN_{184}	—	November 7, 2010	Catalina	CSS	·	5.1 km	MPC · JPL
574553	2010 RV_{189}	—	September 3, 2010	Mount Lemmon	Mount Lemmon Survey	TIR	2.1 km	MPC · JPL
574554	2010 RT_{190}	—	September 3, 2010	Mount Lemmon	Mount Lemmon Survey	·	2.2 km	MPC · JPL
574555	2010 RN_{191}	—	April 9, 2008	Mount Lemmon	Mount Lemmon Survey	·	2.9 km	MPC · JPL
574556	2010 RO_{191}	—	December 26, 2011	Mount Lemmon	Mount Lemmon Survey	·	2.7 km	MPC · JPL
574557	2010 RS_{191}	—	December 11, 2012	Mount Lemmon	Mount Lemmon Survey	ELF	3.7 km	MPC · JPL
574558	2010 RW_{191}	—	October 18, 2011	Kitt Peak	Spacewatch	·	2.7 km	MPC · JPL
574559	2010 RX_{191}	—	September 27, 2016	Mount Lemmon	Mount Lemmon Survey	HYG	2.4 km	MPC · JPL
574560	2010 RY_{191}	—	May 25, 2003	Kitt Peak	Spacewatch	VER	2.5 km	MPC · JPL
574561	2010 RZ_{191}	—	April 9, 2014	Haleakala	Pan-STARRS 1	·	2.2 km	MPC · JPL
574562	2010 RD_{192}	—	January 15, 2008	Kitt Peak	Spacewatch	·	3.0 km	MPC · JPL
574563	2010 RH_{192}	—	September 3, 2010	Mount Lemmon	Mount Lemmon Survey	·	2.9 km	MPC · JPL
574564	2010 RL_{192}	—	January 19, 2013	Mount Lemmon	Mount Lemmon Survey	·	2.8 km	MPC · JPL
574565	2010 RW_{192}	—	January 19, 2013	Mount Lemmon	Mount Lemmon Survey	·	3.3 km	MPC · JPL
574566	2010 RL_{193}	—	May 6, 2014	Haleakala	Pan-STARRS 1	EOS	1.5 km	MPC · JPL
574567	2010 RM_{193}	—	November 24, 2011	Haleakala	Pan-STARRS 1	·	2.9 km	MPC · JPL
574568	2010 RP_{193}	—	September 3, 2010	Mount Lemmon	Mount Lemmon Survey	·	2.6 km	MPC · JPL
574569	2010 RR_{193}	—	August 13, 2010	Kitt Peak	Spacewatch	VER	2.2 km	MPC · JPL
574570 Khabibullin	2010 RA_{194}	Khabibullin	November 4, 2011	Zelenchukskaya Stn	T. V. Krjačko, Satovski, B.	·	2.9 km	MPC · JPL
574571	2010 RF_{195}	—	February 3, 2013	Haleakala	Pan-STARRS 1	·	2.6 km	MPC · JPL
574572	2010 RK_{195}	—	January 30, 2008	Mount Lemmon	Mount Lemmon Survey	HYG	2.6 km	MPC · JPL
574573	2010 RO_{195}	—	October 26, 2011	Haleakala	Pan-STARRS 1	·	2.4 km	MPC · JPL
574574	2010 RA_{199}	—	September 4, 2010	Mount Lemmon	Mount Lemmon Survey	·	2.0 km	MPC · JPL
574575	2010 RB_{199}	—	May 23, 2014	Haleakala	Pan-STARRS 1	·	2.6 km	MPC · JPL
574576	2010 RO_{202}	—	April 30, 2014	Haleakala	Pan-STARRS 1	·	1.3 km	MPC · JPL
574577	2010 RX_{202}	—	July 9, 2015	Haleakala	Pan-STARRS 1	·	2.7 km	MPC · JPL
574578	2010 RV_{204}	—	September 14, 2010	Kitt Peak	Spacewatch	EOS	1.5 km	MPC · JPL
574579	2010 RY_{205}	—	September 4, 2010	Mount Lemmon	Mount Lemmon Survey	·	1 km	MPC · JPL
574580	2010 RR_{206}	—	September 2, 2010	Mount Lemmon	Mount Lemmon Survey	·	530 m	MPC · JPL
574581	2010 RM_{207}	—	September 4, 2010	Mount Lemmon	Mount Lemmon Survey	·	2.1 km	MPC · JPL
574582	2010 RY_{207}	—	September 11, 2010	Kitt Peak	Spacewatch	·	2.4 km	MPC · JPL
574583	2010 RW_{208}	—	September 2, 2010	Mount Lemmon	Mount Lemmon Survey	V	650 m	MPC · JPL
574584	2010 RX_{208}	—	September 11, 2010	Mount Lemmon	Mount Lemmon Survey	·	2.1 km	MPC · JPL
574585	2010 RA_{210}	—	September 3, 2010	Mount Lemmon	Mount Lemmon Survey	·	2.4 km	MPC · JPL
574586	2010 RN_{211}	—	September 15, 2010	Kitt Peak	Spacewatch	·	2.4 km	MPC · JPL
574587	2010 RP_{213}	—	September 5, 2010	Mount Lemmon	Mount Lemmon Survey	EUN	1.1 km	MPC · JPL
574588	2010 SN_{5}	—	September 16, 2010	Mount Lemmon	Mount Lemmon Survey	EOS	1.4 km	MPC · JPL
574589	2010 SM_{19}	—	March 10, 2005	Mount Lemmon	Mount Lemmon Survey	·	710 m	MPC · JPL
574590	2010 SS_{21}	—	March 16, 2005	Catalina	CSS	PHO	920 m	MPC · JPL
574591	2010 SD_{24}	—	January 11, 2008	Kitt Peak	Spacewatch	MAS	690 m	MPC · JPL
574592	2010 SQ_{25}	—	September 29, 2010	Mount Lemmon	Mount Lemmon Survey	MAS	570 m	MPC · JPL
574593	2010 SE_{29}	—	September 12, 2010	Kitt Peak	Spacewatch	NYS	1.0 km	MPC · JPL
574594	2010 SY_{35}	—	September 30, 2010	Piszkés-tető	K. Sárneczky, S. Kürti	THB	2.7 km	MPC · JPL
574595	2010 ST_{39}	—	September 17, 2010	Charleston	R. Holmes	·	720 m	MPC · JPL
574596	2010 SY_{39}	—	November 23, 2006	Mount Lemmon	Mount Lemmon Survey	·	2.7 km	MPC · JPL
574597	2010 ST_{41}	—	February 20, 2012	Haleakala	Pan-STARRS 1	·	1.3 km	MPC · JPL
574598	2010 SU_{41}	—	February 13, 2002	Apache Point	SDSS Collaboration	EOS	2.1 km	MPC · JPL
574599	2010 SY_{42}	—	May 7, 2008	Kitt Peak	Spacewatch	·	2.4 km	MPC · JPL
574600	2010 SW_{45}	—	September 30, 2010	Mount Lemmon	Mount Lemmon Survey	·	3.0 km	MPC · JPL

== 574601–574700 ==
back to top

Designation			Discovery			Properties		Ref
Permanent	Provisional	Named after	Date	Site	Discoverer(s)	Category	Diam.	Ref
574601	2010 SX_{45}	—	September 17, 2010	Mount Lemmon	Mount Lemmon Survey	EOS	2.2 km	MPC · JPL
574602	2010 ST_{47}	—	September 29, 2010	Mount Lemmon	Mount Lemmon Survey	·	2.3 km	MPC · JPL
574603	2010 SZ_{48}	—	September 16, 2010	Mount Lemmon	Mount Lemmon Survey	·	2.3 km	MPC · JPL
574604	2010 SY_{49}	—	November 17, 2014	Haleakala	Pan-STARRS 1	·	790 m	MPC · JPL
574605	2010 SP_{50}	—	December 5, 2007	Mount Lemmon	Mount Lemmon Survey	·	1.3 km	MPC · JPL
574606	2010 SQ_{50}	—	January 18, 2015	Mount Lemmon	Mount Lemmon Survey	·	560 m	MPC · JPL
574607	2010 SB_{54}	—	September 18, 2010	Mount Lemmon	Mount Lemmon Survey	·	2.7 km	MPC · JPL
574608	2010 SJ_{55}	—	September 29, 2010	Mount Lemmon	Mount Lemmon Survey	·	2.5 km	MPC · JPL
574609	2010 SN_{55}	—	September 29, 2010	Mount Lemmon	Mount Lemmon Survey	·	2.4 km	MPC · JPL
574610	2010 SX_{55}	—	September 18, 2010	Mount Lemmon	Mount Lemmon Survey	EOS	1.5 km	MPC · JPL
574611	2010 SZ_{57}	—	September 16, 2010	Mount Lemmon	Mount Lemmon Survey	·	2.3 km	MPC · JPL
574612	2010 TU	—	September 19, 2010	Kitt Peak	Spacewatch	VER	2.4 km	MPC · JPL
574613	2010 TX_{4}	—	September 4, 2010	Kitt Peak	Spacewatch	·	980 m	MPC · JPL
574614	2010 TW_{5}	—	September 15, 2010	Kitt Peak	Spacewatch	NYS	970 m	MPC · JPL
574615	2010 TY_{6}	—	September 1, 2010	Mount Lemmon	Mount Lemmon Survey	·	1.0 km	MPC · JPL
574616	2010 TN_{8}	—	September 2, 2010	Mount Lemmon	Mount Lemmon Survey	·	2.6 km	MPC · JPL
574617	2010 TK_{11}	—	October 1, 2010	La Sagra	OAM	·	3.1 km	MPC · JPL
574618	2010 TW_{12}	—	October 3, 2010	Kitt Peak	Spacewatch	·	2.5 km	MPC · JPL
574619	2010 TF_{15}	—	October 3, 2010	Kitt Peak	Spacewatch	ELF	2.6 km	MPC · JPL
574620	2010 TX_{22}	—	April 12, 2005	Kitt Peak	Deep Ecliptic Survey	·	900 m	MPC · JPL
574621	2010 TP_{27}	—	October 2, 2010	Kitt Peak	Spacewatch	·	3.1 km	MPC · JPL
574622	2010 TR_{32}	—	September 10, 2010	Kitt Peak	Spacewatch	·	1.1 km	MPC · JPL
574623	2010 TQ_{33}	—	October 2, 2010	Kitt Peak	Spacewatch	(3460)	2.4 km	MPC · JPL
574624	2010 TZ_{38}	—	October 31, 2006	Kitt Peak	Spacewatch	·	860 m	MPC · JPL
574625	2010 TY_{52}	—	October 8, 2010	Kitt Peak	Spacewatch	·	2.2 km	MPC · JPL
574626	2010 TA_{56}	—	August 24, 2006	Palomar	NEAT	·	1.3 km	MPC · JPL
574627	2010 TP_{57}	—	October 5, 2010	La Sagra	OAM	·	2.5 km	MPC · JPL
574628	2010 TN_{66}	—	December 16, 2007	Mount Lemmon	Mount Lemmon Survey	V	660 m	MPC · JPL
574629	2010 TX_{73}	—	October 1, 2010	Kitt Peak	Spacewatch	THB	2.5 km	MPC · JPL
574630	2010 TG_{76}	—	September 16, 2010	Mount Lemmon	Mount Lemmon Survey	·	2.0 km	MPC · JPL
574631	2010 TQ_{76}	—	October 16, 2006	Mount Lemmon	Mount Lemmon Survey	V	650 m	MPC · JPL
574632	2010 TX_{76}	—	October 8, 2010	Catalina	CSS	·	1.1 km	MPC · JPL
574633	2010 TR_{77}	—	October 8, 2010	Kitt Peak	Spacewatch	·	850 m	MPC · JPL
574634	2010 TT_{77}	—	October 8, 2010	Kitt Peak	Spacewatch	·	2.6 km	MPC · JPL
574635 Jánossy	2010 TK_{81}	Jánossy	September 6, 2010	Piszkéstető	K. Sárneczky, Z. Kuli	·	1.5 km	MPC · JPL
574636	2010 TC_{82}	—	October 9, 2010	Kitt Peak	Spacewatch	V	710 m	MPC · JPL
574637	2010 TC_{85}	—	September 15, 2010	Kitt Peak	Spacewatch	·	2.3 km	MPC · JPL
574638	2010 TM_{86}	—	October 9, 2010	Kitt Peak	Spacewatch	·	2.4 km	MPC · JPL
574639	2010 TV_{88}	—	September 30, 2010	Mount Lemmon	Mount Lemmon Survey	·	2.1 km	MPC · JPL
574640	2010 TG_{89}	—	March 21, 2009	Mount Lemmon	Mount Lemmon Survey	PHO	680 m	MPC · JPL
574641	2010 TV_{95}	—	March 28, 2008	Kitt Peak	Spacewatch	·	3.1 km	MPC · JPL
574642	2010 TO_{99}	—	March 30, 2008	Kitt Peak	Spacewatch	·	2.8 km	MPC · JPL
574643	2010 TH_{100}	—	April 28, 2008	Kitt Peak	Spacewatch	URS	3.2 km	MPC · JPL
574644	2010 TK_{105}	—	October 9, 2010	Kitt Peak	Spacewatch	THB	2.5 km	MPC · JPL
574645	2010 TE_{109}	—	October 1, 2010	Mount Lemmon	Mount Lemmon Survey	THM	2.0 km	MPC · JPL
574646	2010 TJ_{110}	—	October 9, 2010	Mount Lemmon	Mount Lemmon Survey	·	930 m	MPC · JPL
574647	2010 TP_{116}	—	October 9, 2010	Kitt Peak	Spacewatch	·	2.4 km	MPC · JPL
574648	2010 TC_{121}	—	February 26, 2009	Mount Lemmon	Mount Lemmon Survey	·	990 m	MPC · JPL
574649	2010 TH_{127}	—	August 17, 2006	Palomar	NEAT	NYS	1.2 km	MPC · JPL
574650	2010 TY_{129}	—	October 11, 2010	Catalina	CSS	·	1.0 km	MPC · JPL
574651	2010 TT_{130}	—	October 11, 2010	Mount Lemmon	Mount Lemmon Survey	·	3.3 km	MPC · JPL
574652	2010 TB_{132}	—	April 30, 2009	Mount Lemmon	Mount Lemmon Survey	·	1.1 km	MPC · JPL
574653	2010 TJ_{134}	—	October 11, 2010	Mount Lemmon	Mount Lemmon Survey	·	770 m	MPC · JPL
574654	2010 TB_{139}	—	October 11, 2010	Mount Lemmon	Mount Lemmon Survey	·	3.5 km	MPC · JPL
574655	2010 TD_{147}	—	October 11, 2010	Mount Lemmon	Mount Lemmon Survey	·	1.3 km	MPC · JPL
574656	2010 TP_{154}	—	September 10, 2010	Kitt Peak	Spacewatch	·	3.8 km	MPC · JPL
574657	2010 TA_{158}	—	March 29, 2008	Kitt Peak	Spacewatch	·	3.1 km	MPC · JPL
574658	2010 TX_{164}	—	November 29, 2005	Kitt Peak	Spacewatch	·	2.4 km	MPC · JPL
574659	2010 TV_{166}	—	October 10, 2010	Mount Lemmon	Mount Lemmon Survey	V	470 m	MPC · JPL
574660	2010 TM_{167}	—	October 14, 2010	Mount Lemmon	Mount Lemmon Survey	APO	220 m	MPC · JPL
574661	2010 TG_{169}	—	September 14, 2010	Dauban	C. Rinner, Kugel, F.	NYS	1.2 km	MPC · JPL
574662	2010 TV_{171}	—	August 14, 2004	Cerro Tololo	Deep Ecliptic Survey	·	2.6 km	MPC · JPL
574663	2010 TP_{172}	—	August 27, 2006	Kitt Peak	Spacewatch	NYS	830 m	MPC · JPL
574664	2010 TV_{179}	—	November 1, 1999	Kitt Peak	Spacewatch	VER	2.6 km	MPC · JPL
574665	2010 TC_{184}	—	November 1, 2010	Mount Lemmon	Mount Lemmon Survey	TIR	3.0 km	MPC · JPL
574666	2010 TZ_{186}	—	October 9, 2010	Palomar	Palomar Transient Factory	·	1.1 km	MPC · JPL
574667	2010 TE_{187}	—	November 2, 2010	Mount Lemmon	Mount Lemmon Survey	PHO	940 m	MPC · JPL
574668	2010 TS_{196}	—	March 13, 2013	Haleakala	Pan-STARRS 1	·	2.6 km	MPC · JPL
574669	2010 TZ_{197}	—	October 12, 2010	Mount Lemmon	Mount Lemmon Survey	·	1.1 km	MPC · JPL
574670	2010 TL_{203}	—	October 12, 2010	Mount Lemmon	Mount Lemmon Survey	·	830 m	MPC · JPL
574671	2010 TT_{207}	—	February 5, 2013	Kitt Peak	Spacewatch	·	3.2 km	MPC · JPL
574672	2010 TG_{213}	—	October 1, 2010	Mount Lemmon	Mount Lemmon Survey	PHO	600 m	MPC · JPL
574673	2010 TM_{213}	—	October 1, 2010	Mount Lemmon	Mount Lemmon Survey	·	1.1 km	MPC · JPL
574674	2010 TA_{214}	—	October 10, 2016	Mount Lemmon	Mount Lemmon Survey	·	2.8 km	MPC · JPL
574675	2010 TC_{218}	—	October 11, 2010	Mount Lemmon	Mount Lemmon Survey	EOS	1.3 km	MPC · JPL
574676	2010 UO_{5}	—	October 17, 2010	Kitt Peak	Spacewatch	·	3.4 km	MPC · JPL
574677	2010 UB_{18}	—	October 28, 2010	Mount Lemmon	Mount Lemmon Survey	·	2.8 km	MPC · JPL
574678	2010 UK_{28}	—	October 28, 2010	Mount Lemmon	Mount Lemmon Survey	MIS	2.1 km	MPC · JPL
574679	2010 UL_{32}	—	October 12, 2010	Mount Lemmon	Mount Lemmon Survey	·	2.7 km	MPC · JPL
574680	2010 UX_{38}	—	December 5, 2005	Kitt Peak	Spacewatch	·	4.2 km	MPC · JPL
574681	2010 UM_{39}	—	June 17, 2009	Kitt Peak	Spacewatch	·	2.9 km	MPC · JPL
574682	2010 UJ_{40}	—	November 12, 2006	Mount Lemmon	Mount Lemmon Survey	MAR	760 m	MPC · JPL
574683	2010 UC_{43}	—	April 20, 2004	Kitt Peak	Spacewatch	H	310 m	MPC · JPL
574684	2010 UN_{46}	—	October 11, 2010	Mount Lemmon	Mount Lemmon Survey	·	2.1 km	MPC · JPL
574685	2010 UH_{50}	—	October 31, 2010	Kitt Peak	Spacewatch	L4 · 006	10 km	MPC · JPL
574686	2010 UX_{55}	—	October 29, 2010	Mount Lemmon	Mount Lemmon Survey	·	2.8 km	MPC · JPL
574687	2010 UW_{57}	—	October 29, 2010	Kitt Peak	Spacewatch	·	1.5 km	MPC · JPL
574688	2010 UD_{58}	—	October 29, 2010	Kitt Peak	Spacewatch	·	2.3 km	MPC · JPL
574689	2010 UG_{66}	—	August 27, 2006	Kitt Peak	Spacewatch	MAS	660 m	MPC · JPL
574690	2010 UC_{67}	—	October 2, 2010	Mount Lemmon	Mount Lemmon Survey	V	570 m	MPC · JPL
574691 Horgerantal	2010 UB_{68}	Horgerantal	October 31, 2010	Piszkéstető	K. Sárneczky, Z. Kuli	·	1.1 km	MPC · JPL
574692	2010 UJ_{71}	—	September 4, 2010	Kitt Peak	Spacewatch	KOR	1.3 km	MPC · JPL
574693	2010 UM_{72}	—	September 27, 2006	Catalina	CSS	·	1.3 km	MPC · JPL
574694	2010 UM_{77}	—	December 28, 2005	Kitt Peak	Spacewatch	·	3.2 km	MPC · JPL
574695	2010 US_{77}	—	February 2, 2008	Kitt Peak	Spacewatch	·	1.3 km	MPC · JPL
574696	2010 UH_{83}	—	October 29, 2010	Mount Lemmon	Mount Lemmon Survey	·	3.3 km	MPC · JPL
574697	2010 UU_{84}	—	November 10, 2005	Catalina	CSS	·	4.1 km	MPC · JPL
574698	2010 UK_{93}	—	January 30, 2003	Kitt Peak	Spacewatch	·	1.3 km	MPC · JPL
574699	2010 UJ_{94}	—	February 17, 2004	Kitt Peak	Spacewatch	·	870 m	MPC · JPL
574700	2010 UF_{97}	—	October 28, 2010	Mount Lemmon	Mount Lemmon Survey	·	1.1 km	MPC · JPL

== 574701–574800 ==
back to top

Designation			Discovery			Properties		Ref
Permanent	Provisional	Named after	Date	Site	Discoverer(s)	Category	Diam.	Ref
574701	2010 UD_{102}	—	September 3, 2010	Mount Lemmon	Mount Lemmon Survey	H	350 m	MPC · JPL
574702	2010 UJ_{102}	—	October 1, 2005	Mount Lemmon	Mount Lemmon Survey	KOR	1.1 km	MPC · JPL
574703	2010 UM_{107}	—	October 28, 2005	Mount Lemmon	Mount Lemmon Survey	·	3.1 km	MPC · JPL
574704	2010 UK_{110}	—	October 17, 2010	Mount Lemmon	Mount Lemmon Survey	NYS	770 m	MPC · JPL
574705	2010 UP_{110}	—	October 17, 2010	Mount Lemmon	Mount Lemmon Survey	·	1.1 km	MPC · JPL
574706	2010 UV_{110}	—	October 31, 2010	Mount Lemmon	Mount Lemmon Survey	·	2.7 km	MPC · JPL
574707	2010 UG_{114}	—	October 17, 2010	Mount Lemmon	Mount Lemmon Survey	V	370 m	MPC · JPL
574708	2010 UM_{117}	—	March 12, 2013	Mount Lemmon	Mount Lemmon Survey	·	3.0 km	MPC · JPL
574709	2010 UV_{117}	—	October 31, 2010	Kitt Peak	Spacewatch	·	2.6 km	MPC · JPL
574710	2010 UG_{121}	—	November 10, 2004	Kitt Peak	Spacewatch	·	3.6 km	MPC · JPL
574711	2010 US_{121}	—	October 19, 2010	Mount Lemmon	Mount Lemmon Survey	·	3.0 km	MPC · JPL
574712	2010 UU_{121}	—	October 29, 2010	Mount Lemmon	Mount Lemmon Survey	·	2.3 km	MPC · JPL
574713	2010 UX_{121}	—	October 31, 2010	Mount Lemmon	Mount Lemmon Survey	·	920 m	MPC · JPL
574714	2010 UC_{126}	—	October 29, 2010	Mount Lemmon	Mount Lemmon Survey	L4	7.8 km	MPC · JPL
574715	2010 VK_{5}	—	November 1, 2010	Mount Lemmon	Mount Lemmon Survey	·	1.0 km	MPC · JPL
574716	2010 VF_{6}	—	November 1, 2010	Mount Lemmon	Mount Lemmon Survey	·	1.2 km	MPC · JPL
574717	2010 VL_{14}	—	August 16, 2006	Palomar	NEAT	·	1.2 km	MPC · JPL
574718	2010 VW_{17}	—	November 2, 2010	Kitt Peak	Spacewatch	·	930 m	MPC · JPL
574719	2010 VT_{18}	—	November 2, 2010	Mount Lemmon	Mount Lemmon Survey	·	990 m	MPC · JPL
574720	2010 VK_{29}	—	January 18, 2008	Kitt Peak	Spacewatch	·	1.2 km	MPC · JPL
574721	2010 VB_{35}	—	October 23, 2005	Catalina	CSS	·	2.8 km	MPC · JPL
574722	2010 VB_{47}	—	November 2, 2010	Kitt Peak	Spacewatch	·	960 m	MPC · JPL
574723	2010 VX_{57}	—	November 4, 2010	Les Engarouines	L. Bernasconi	HNS	1.6 km	MPC · JPL
574724	2010 VW_{65}	—	November 20, 2006	Mount Lemmon	Mount Lemmon Survey	·	980 m	MPC · JPL
574725	2010 VH_{67}	—	December 31, 2007	Kitt Peak	Spacewatch	·	1.1 km	MPC · JPL
574726	2010 VR_{68}	—	November 4, 2010	Mount Lemmon	Mount Lemmon Survey	·	3.3 km	MPC · JPL
574727	2010 VV_{71}	—	September 17, 2010	Catalina	CSS	PHO	940 m	MPC · JPL
574728	2010 VW_{74}	—	March 11, 2005	Kitt Peak	Spacewatch	·	1.2 km	MPC · JPL
574729	2010 VV_{77}	—	November 3, 2010	Mount Lemmon	Mount Lemmon Survey	·	1.2 km	MPC · JPL
574730	2010 VN_{87}	—	September 18, 2006	Kitt Peak	Spacewatch	·	920 m	MPC · JPL
574731	2010 VE_{91}	—	October 29, 2010	Kitt Peak	Spacewatch	·	1.1 km	MPC · JPL
574732	2010 VM_{92}	—	April 5, 2008	Flagstaff	Wasserman, L. H.	·	2.9 km	MPC · JPL
574733	2010 VW_{96}	—	October 31, 2010	Kitt Peak	Spacewatch	PHO	880 m	MPC · JPL
574734	2010 VM_{100}	—	October 14, 2010	Mount Lemmon	Mount Lemmon Survey	·	1.0 km	MPC · JPL
574735	2010 VO_{104}	—	January 16, 2007	Catalina	CSS	·	1.9 km	MPC · JPL
574736	2010 VY_{107}	—	November 6, 2010	Kitt Peak	Spacewatch	H	370 m	MPC · JPL
574737	2010 VM_{110}	—	November 6, 2010	Mount Lemmon	Mount Lemmon Survey	·	580 m	MPC · JPL
574738	2010 VJ_{117}	—	November 8, 2010	Kitt Peak	Spacewatch	·	1.2 km	MPC · JPL
574739	2010 VW_{128}	—	July 21, 2006	Mount Lemmon	Mount Lemmon Survey	·	1.1 km	MPC · JPL
574740	2010 VO_{135}	—	November 10, 2010	Mount Lemmon	Mount Lemmon Survey	·	2.7 km	MPC · JPL
574741	2010 VS_{136}	—	November 10, 2010	Kitt Peak	Spacewatch	EOS	1.5 km	MPC · JPL
574742 Annatsybuleva	2010 VN_{137}	Annatsybuleva	November 10, 2010	Zelenchukskaya Stn	T. V. Krjačko, Satovski, B.	·	1.2 km	MPC · JPL
574743	2010 VZ_{138}	—	November 11, 2010	Mount Lemmon	Mount Lemmon Survey	·	1.5 km	MPC · JPL
574744	2010 VY_{154}	—	November 7, 2010	Mount Lemmon	Mount Lemmon Survey	·	910 m	MPC · JPL
574745	2010 VN_{158}	—	November 8, 2010	Mauna Kea	Forshay, P., M. Micheli	·	860 m	MPC · JPL
574746	2010 VR_{160}	—	June 17, 2004	Palomar	NEAT	H	780 m	MPC · JPL
574747	2010 VB_{161}	—	September 11, 2004	Socorro	LINEAR	LIX	3.3 km	MPC · JPL
574748	2010 VG_{163}	—	November 10, 2010	Kitt Peak	Spacewatch	·	800 m	MPC · JPL
574749	2010 VX_{187}	—	November 13, 2010	Mount Lemmon	Mount Lemmon Survey	·	880 m	MPC · JPL
574750	2010 VZ_{200}	—	November 5, 2004	Palomar	NEAT	T_{j} (2.99)	4.5 km	MPC · JPL
574751	2010 VX_{202}	—	November 12, 2010	Mount Lemmon	Mount Lemmon Survey	L4	8.8 km	MPC · JPL
574752	2010 VU_{203}	—	November 12, 2010	Mount Lemmon	Mount Lemmon Survey	·	1.3 km	MPC · JPL
574753	2010 VO_{206}	—	October 30, 2005	Mount Lemmon	Mount Lemmon Survey	·	3.7 km	MPC · JPL
574754	2010 VG_{207}	—	November 2, 2010	Mount Lemmon	Mount Lemmon Survey	·	1.8 km	MPC · JPL
574755	2010 VQ_{208}	—	December 29, 2011	Kitt Peak	Spacewatch	·	3.3 km	MPC · JPL
574756	2010 VJ_{218}	—	November 4, 2010	Palomar	Palomar Transient Factory	·	1.3 km	MPC · JPL
574757	2010 VN_{219}	—	November 1, 2010	Palomar	Palomar Transient Factory	·	1.2 km	MPC · JPL
574758	2010 VJ_{226}	—	April 20, 2012	Mount Lemmon	Mount Lemmon Survey	·	2.4 km	MPC · JPL
574759	2010 VY_{241}	—	November 5, 2010	Mount Lemmon	Mount Lemmon Survey	·	1.1 km	MPC · JPL
574760	2010 VC_{244}	—	November 2, 2010	Kitt Peak	Spacewatch	·	3.4 km	MPC · JPL
574761	2010 VN_{250}	—	November 24, 1998	Kitt Peak	Spacewatch	L4	7.7 km	MPC · JPL
574762	2010 VB_{251}	—	November 1, 2010	Mount Lemmon	Mount Lemmon Survey	·	3.2 km	MPC · JPL
574763	2010 VD_{251}	—	November 2, 2010	Mount Lemmon	Mount Lemmon Survey	·	860 m	MPC · JPL
574764	2010 VM_{251}	—	November 2, 2010	Mount Lemmon	Mount Lemmon Survey	L4	8.2 km	MPC · JPL
574765	2010 VK_{252}	—	November 5, 2010	Mount Lemmon	Mount Lemmon Survey	·	1.1 km	MPC · JPL
574766	2010 VM_{253}	—	November 3, 2010	Mount Lemmon	Mount Lemmon Survey	·	3.0 km	MPC · JPL
574767	2010 VX_{253}	—	November 3, 2010	Kitt Peak	Spacewatch	VER	2.4 km	MPC · JPL
574768	2010 VH_{255}	—	November 4, 2010	Mount Lemmon	Mount Lemmon Survey	·	2.5 km	MPC · JPL
574769	2010 VJ_{255}	—	November 8, 2010	Kitt Peak	Spacewatch	H	360 m	MPC · JPL
574770	2010 VN_{256}	—	November 8, 2010	Kitt Peak	Spacewatch	L4	8.9 km	MPC · JPL
574771	2010 VH_{260}	—	November 10, 2010	Mount Lemmon	Mount Lemmon Survey	·	2.8 km	MPC · JPL
574772	2010 VD_{262}	—	November 6, 2010	Mount Lemmon	Mount Lemmon Survey	H	360 m	MPC · JPL
574773	2010 VU_{262}	—	November 14, 2010	Mount Lemmon	Mount Lemmon Survey	L4	8.0 km	MPC · JPL
574774	2010 WP_{5}	—	November 27, 2010	Mount Lemmon	Mount Lemmon Survey	·	940 m	MPC · JPL
574775	2010 WB_{12}	—	November 26, 2010	Mount Lemmon	Mount Lemmon Survey	·	1.5 km	MPC · JPL
574776	2010 WZ_{16}	—	November 27, 2010	Mount Lemmon	Mount Lemmon Survey	·	1.4 km	MPC · JPL
574777	2010 WL_{28}	—	November 27, 2010	Mount Lemmon	Mount Lemmon Survey	·	1.2 km	MPC · JPL
574778	2010 WK_{40}	—	October 30, 2010	Kitt Peak	Spacewatch	·	940 m	MPC · JPL
574779	2010 WO_{43}	—	April 1, 2008	Kitt Peak	Spacewatch	·	1.1 km	MPC · JPL
574780	2010 WU_{49}	—	November 13, 2010	Kitt Peak	Spacewatch	·	1.0 km	MPC · JPL
574781	2010 WV_{49}	—	November 27, 2010	Mount Lemmon	Mount Lemmon Survey	EOS	1.6 km	MPC · JPL
574782	2010 WL_{56}	—	November 5, 2010	Mayhill-ISON	L. Elenin	·	1.5 km	MPC · JPL
574783	2010 WC_{57}	—	October 14, 2010	Mount Lemmon	Mount Lemmon Survey	·	1.2 km	MPC · JPL
574784	2010 WE_{60}	—	October 29, 2010	Catalina	CSS	·	1.1 km	MPC · JPL
574785	2010 WA_{64}	—	September 3, 2008	Kitt Peak	Spacewatch	L4	6.2 km	MPC · JPL
574786	2010 WF_{64}	—	November 3, 2010	Kitt Peak	Spacewatch	·	1.4 km	MPC · JPL
574787	2010 WM_{66}	—	February 29, 2004	Kitt Peak	Spacewatch	·	1.3 km	MPC · JPL
574788	2010 WJ_{74}	—	December 9, 2010	Catalina	CSS	·	4.7 km	MPC · JPL
574789	2010 WW_{74}	—	November 16, 2010	Mount Lemmon	Mount Lemmon Survey	·	2.0 km	MPC · JPL
574790	2010 WO_{75}	—	June 24, 2014	Haleakala	Pan-STARRS 1	·	4.2 km	MPC · JPL
574791	2010 WS_{78}	—	November 26, 2010	Mount Lemmon	Mount Lemmon Survey	·	2.7 km	MPC · JPL
574792	2010 XT	—	July 31, 2000	Cerro Tololo	Deep Ecliptic Survey	BAR	1.5 km	MPC · JPL
574793	2010 XL_{2}	—	December 1, 2010	Mount Lemmon	Mount Lemmon Survey	·	2.2 km	MPC · JPL
574794	2010 XJ_{4}	—	December 2, 2010	Vitebsk	Nevski, V.	·	1.6 km	MPC · JPL
574795	2010 XJ_{5}	—	November 18, 2006	Mount Lemmon	Mount Lemmon Survey	·	1.3 km	MPC · JPL
574796	2010 XB_{7}	—	December 2, 2010	Mount Lemmon	Mount Lemmon Survey	·	2.7 km	MPC · JPL
574797	2010 XM_{12}	—	December 1, 2010	Mount Lemmon	Mount Lemmon Survey	·	2.6 km	MPC · JPL
574798	2010 XJ_{17}	—	December 2, 2010	Kitt Peak	Spacewatch	·	880 m	MPC · JPL
574799	2010 XS_{21}	—	November 12, 2010	Mount Lemmon	Mount Lemmon Survey	·	1.5 km	MPC · JPL
574800	2010 XJ_{26}	—	December 1, 2010	Mount Lemmon	Mount Lemmon Survey	·	780 m	MPC · JPL

== 574801–574900 ==
back to top

Designation			Discovery			Properties		Ref
Permanent	Provisional	Named after	Date	Site	Discoverer(s)	Category	Diam.	Ref
574801	2010 XC_{37}	—	December 21, 2006	Mount Lemmon	Mount Lemmon Survey	·	2.1 km	MPC · JPL
574802	2010 XS_{37}	—	November 27, 2006	Mount Lemmon	Mount Lemmon Survey	·	990 m	MPC · JPL
574803	2010 XC_{40}	—	December 21, 2006	Kitt Peak	Spacewatch	·	1.5 km	MPC · JPL
574804	2010 XZ_{45}	—	December 3, 2010	Mount Lemmon	Mount Lemmon Survey	HNS	1.2 km	MPC · JPL
574805	2010 XC_{46}	—	December 4, 2010	Mount Lemmon	Mount Lemmon Survey	·	1.1 km	MPC · JPL
574806	2010 XG_{56}	—	December 9, 2010	Mount Lemmon	Mount Lemmon Survey	·	2.5 km	MPC · JPL
574807	2010 XM_{62}	—	October 19, 2006	Catalina	CSS	·	1.2 km	MPC · JPL
574808	2010 XM_{64}	—	November 27, 2010	Mount Lemmon	Mount Lemmon Survey	(1547)	1.5 km	MPC · JPL
574809	2010 XB_{66}	—	March 26, 2003	Apache Point	SDSS	H	500 m	MPC · JPL
574810	2010 XU_{67}	—	December 5, 2010	Mount Lemmon	Mount Lemmon Survey	EUN	1.4 km	MPC · JPL
574811	2010 XB_{68}	—	October 12, 2004	Anderson Mesa	LONEOS	·	3.6 km	MPC · JPL
574812	2010 XL_{72}	—	October 11, 2006	Palomar	NEAT	·	1.0 km	MPC · JPL
574813	2010 XT_{74}	—	December 1, 2006	Mount Lemmon	Mount Lemmon Survey	MAR	950 m	MPC · JPL
574814	2010 XO_{84}	—	December 2, 2010	Mount Lemmon	Mount Lemmon Survey	KON	2.2 km	MPC · JPL
574815	2010 XT_{92}	—	October 15, 2001	Palomar	NEAT	·	1.3 km	MPC · JPL
574816	2010 XU_{92}	—	February 21, 2007	Bergisch Gladbach	W. Bickel	·	1.4 km	MPC · JPL
574817	2010 XZ_{92}	—	December 8, 2010	Mount Lemmon	Mount Lemmon Survey	·	1.4 km	MPC · JPL
574818	2010 XQ_{95}	—	December 14, 2010	Mount Lemmon	Mount Lemmon Survey	·	1.4 km	MPC · JPL
574819	2010 XU_{95}	—	November 22, 2014	Haleakala	Pan-STARRS 1	MAR	880 m	MPC · JPL
574820	2010 XW_{95}	—	December 13, 2010	Mount Lemmon	Mount Lemmon Survey	EOS	1.7 km	MPC · JPL
574821	2010 XS_{98}	—	March 16, 2012	Haleakala	Pan-STARRS 1	3:2	4.0 km	MPC · JPL
574822	2010 XS_{102}	—	April 12, 2013	Mount Graham	Boyle, R. P.	·	3.2 km	MPC · JPL
574823	2010 XO_{103}	—	November 6, 2016	Mount Lemmon	Mount Lemmon Survey	T_{j} (2.99)	4.0 km	MPC · JPL
574824	2010 XS_{105}	—	December 10, 2010	Mount Lemmon	Mount Lemmon Survey	·	980 m	MPC · JPL
574825	2010 XD_{107}	—	January 2, 2012	Mount Lemmon	Mount Lemmon Survey	T_{j} (2.98) · 3:2	4.3 km	MPC · JPL
574826	2010 XX_{107}	—	January 4, 2016	Haleakala	Pan-STARRS 1	·	1.3 km	MPC · JPL
574827	2010 XZ_{107}	—	December 10, 2014	Mount Lemmon	Mount Lemmon Survey	·	1.7 km	MPC · JPL
574828	2010 XY_{108}	—	December 14, 2010	Mount Lemmon	Mount Lemmon Survey	JUN	850 m	MPC · JPL
574829	2010 XT_{109}	—	December 6, 2010	Mount Lemmon	Mount Lemmon Survey	·	1.2 km	MPC · JPL
574830	2010 XS_{110}	—	December 2, 2010	Mount Lemmon	Mount Lemmon Survey	MAR	890 m	MPC · JPL
574831	2010 XQ_{112}	—	December 13, 2010	Mount Lemmon	Mount Lemmon Survey	L4	6.9 km	MPC · JPL
574832	2010 XN_{113}	—	December 3, 2010	Mount Lemmon	Mount Lemmon Survey	L4	6.8 km	MPC · JPL
574833	2010 XT_{113}	—	December 8, 2010	Mount Lemmon	Mount Lemmon Survey	·	1.5 km	MPC · JPL
574834	2010 YV_{2}	—	December 30, 2010	Piszkés-tető	K. Sárneczky, Z. Kuli	MAR	950 m	MPC · JPL
574835	2010 YY_{5}	—	December 25, 2010	Mount Lemmon	Mount Lemmon Survey	·	1.5 km	MPC · JPL
574836	2010 YB_{6}	—	December 25, 2010	Mount Lemmon	Mount Lemmon Survey	EUN	1.3 km	MPC · JPL
574837	2011 AH_{9}	—	December 14, 2010	Mount Lemmon	Mount Lemmon Survey	·	1.4 km	MPC · JPL
574838	2011 AY_{10}	—	January 3, 2011	Mount Lemmon	Mount Lemmon Survey	·	810 m	MPC · JPL
574839	2011 AS_{14}	—	March 13, 2007	Catalina	CSS	·	1.7 km	MPC · JPL
574840	2011 AK_{15}	—	January 2, 2011	Mount Lemmon	Mount Lemmon Survey	·	1.9 km	MPC · JPL
574841	2011 AB_{24}	—	March 9, 2003	Anderson Mesa	LONEOS	·	2.2 km	MPC · JPL
574842	2011 AE_{27}	—	June 20, 2003	Palomar	NEAT	BAR	1.7 km	MPC · JPL
574843	2011 AE_{31}	—	November 25, 2006	Kitt Peak	Spacewatch	·	1.2 km	MPC · JPL
574844	2011 AX_{31}	—	January 10, 2011	Mount Lemmon	Mount Lemmon Survey	·	1.5 km	MPC · JPL
574845	2011 AF_{32}	—	January 17, 2007	Kitt Peak	Spacewatch	·	1.2 km	MPC · JPL
574846	2011 AG_{32}	—	January 10, 2011	Mount Lemmon	Mount Lemmon Survey	·	1.3 km	MPC · JPL
574847	2011 AB_{33}	—	September 18, 2006	Kitt Peak	Spacewatch	·	570 m	MPC · JPL
574848	2011 AN_{45}	—	January 9, 2007	Palomar	NEAT	·	1.8 km	MPC · JPL
574849	2011 AW_{49}	—	March 25, 2007	Mount Lemmon	Mount Lemmon Survey	·	1.2 km	MPC · JPL
574850	2011 AU_{50}	—	November 15, 2010	Mount Lemmon	Mount Lemmon Survey	·	1.6 km	MPC · JPL
574851	2011 AU_{52}	—	December 9, 2010	Mount Lemmon	Mount Lemmon Survey	·	1.2 km	MPC · JPL
574852	2011 AP_{64}	—	December 14, 2010	Mount Lemmon	Mount Lemmon Survey	EUN	1.1 km	MPC · JPL
574853	2011 AS_{67}	—	December 10, 2010	Mount Lemmon	Mount Lemmon Survey	·	2.0 km	MPC · JPL
574854	2011 AA_{68}	—	January 12, 2008	Kitt Peak	Spacewatch	·	910 m	MPC · JPL
574855	2011 AS_{71}	—	January 14, 2011	Mount Lemmon	Mount Lemmon Survey	·	1.1 km	MPC · JPL
574856	2011 AA_{72}	—	January 14, 2011	Mount Lemmon	Mount Lemmon Survey	·	1.5 km	MPC · JPL
574857	2011 AN_{74}	—	January 5, 2011	Mount Lemmon	Mount Lemmon Survey	·	900 m	MPC · JPL
574858	2011 AL_{81}	—	December 14, 2010	Mount Lemmon	Mount Lemmon Survey	(5)	1.1 km	MPC · JPL
574859	2011 AR_{82}	—	January 12, 2011	Mount Lemmon	Mount Lemmon Survey	·	940 m	MPC · JPL
574860	2011 AM_{84}	—	January 4, 2011	Mount Lemmon	Mount Lemmon Survey	·	1.3 km	MPC · JPL
574861	2011 AX_{84}	—	January 8, 2011	Mount Lemmon	Mount Lemmon Survey	·	1.1 km	MPC · JPL
574862	2011 AO_{85}	—	December 21, 2014	Haleakala	Pan-STARRS 1	·	1.0 km	MPC · JPL
574863	2011 AR_{85}	—	January 13, 2011	Mount Lemmon	Mount Lemmon Survey	·	760 m	MPC · JPL
574864	2011 AY_{85}	—	January 9, 2011	Mount Lemmon	Mount Lemmon Survey	MAR	800 m	MPC · JPL
574865	2011 AN_{87}	—	January 14, 2011	Mount Lemmon	Mount Lemmon Survey	·	950 m	MPC · JPL
574866	2011 AN_{89}	—	January 7, 2016	Haleakala	Pan-STARRS 1	·	2.0 km	MPC · JPL
574867	2011 AU_{89}	—	January 14, 2011	Mount Lemmon	Mount Lemmon Survey	·	1.5 km	MPC · JPL
574868	2011 AD_{93}	—	August 25, 2014	Haleakala	Pan-STARRS 1	·	1.2 km	MPC · JPL
574869	2011 AN_{94}	—	January 15, 2011	Mount Lemmon	Mount Lemmon Survey	·	1.3 km	MPC · JPL
574870	2011 AU_{95}	—	January 12, 2011	Kitt Peak	Spacewatch	·	1.2 km	MPC · JPL
574871	2011 BN_{3}	—	February 17, 2007	Mount Lemmon	Mount Lemmon Survey	NEM	2.0 km	MPC · JPL
574872	2011 BS_{3}	—	December 21, 2006	Kitt Peak	L. H. Wasserman, M. W. Buie	(5)	1.1 km	MPC · JPL
574873	2011 BQ_{24}	—	November 6, 2010	Kitt Peak	Spacewatch	L4	10 km	MPC · JPL
574874	2011 BC_{27}	—	January 25, 2011	Kitt Peak	Spacewatch	EOS	1.5 km	MPC · JPL
574875	2011 BP_{28}	—	January 9, 2011	Mount Lemmon	Mount Lemmon Survey	·	1.3 km	MPC · JPL
574876	2011 BW_{29}	—	October 6, 2002	Palomar	NEAT	·	860 m	MPC · JPL
574877	2011 BH_{47}	—	January 31, 2011	Piszkés-tető	K. Sárneczky, Z. Kuli	·	710 m	MPC · JPL
574878	2011 BU_{47}	—	January 31, 2011	Piszkés-tető	K. Sárneczky, Z. Kuli	·	1.8 km	MPC · JPL
574879	2011 BJ_{49}	—	September 21, 2000	Kitt Peak	Deep Ecliptic Survey	·	2.1 km	MPC · JPL
574880	2011 BG_{50}	—	January 31, 2011	Piszkés-tető	K. Sárneczky, Z. Kuli	HNS	910 m	MPC · JPL
574881	2011 BL_{59}	—	January 13, 2002	Kitt Peak	Spacewatch	·	1.6 km	MPC · JPL
574882	2011 BD_{60}	—	January 30, 2011	Mount Lemmon	Mount Lemmon Survey	·	1.7 km	MPC · JPL
574883	2011 BR_{60}	—	February 21, 2003	Palomar	NEAT	MAR	1.1 km	MPC · JPL
574884	2011 BQ_{69}	—	April 24, 2003	Kitt Peak	Spacewatch	·	1.6 km	MPC · JPL
574885	2011 BA_{77}	—	January 30, 2011	Haleakala	Pan-STARRS 1	·	1.1 km	MPC · JPL
574886	2011 BM_{77}	—	October 10, 2010	Mount Lemmon	Mount Lemmon Survey	·	4.2 km	MPC · JPL
574887	2011 BQ_{77}	—	February 26, 2007	Mount Lemmon	Mount Lemmon Survey	LIX	3.7 km	MPC · JPL
574888	2011 BQ_{79}	—	January 18, 2004	Palomar	NEAT	·	400 m	MPC · JPL
574889	2011 BA_{87}	—	October 15, 2001	Palomar	NEAT	·	1.1 km	MPC · JPL
574890	2011 BR_{87}	—	January 27, 2011	Mount Lemmon	Mount Lemmon Survey	·	1.3 km	MPC · JPL
574891	2011 BA_{95}	—	December 5, 2010	Mount Lemmon	Mount Lemmon Survey	·	1.3 km	MPC · JPL
574892	2011 BP_{109}	—	February 12, 2011	Mount Lemmon	Mount Lemmon Survey	·	1.3 km	MPC · JPL
574893	2011 BA_{110}	—	October 24, 2009	Kitt Peak	Spacewatch	·	1.4 km	MPC · JPL
574894	2011 BU_{114}	—	November 12, 2005	Kitt Peak	Spacewatch	·	1.8 km	MPC · JPL
574895	2011 BB_{115}	—	January 14, 2011	Kitt Peak	Spacewatch	EUN	930 m	MPC · JPL
574896	2011 BY_{116}	—	March 23, 2003	Apache Point	SDSS Collaboration	·	1.6 km	MPC · JPL
574897	2011 BX_{123}	—	September 21, 2009	Kitt Peak	Spacewatch	·	1.5 km	MPC · JPL
574898	2011 BG_{124}	—	October 21, 2003	Kitt Peak	Spacewatch	·	3.4 km	MPC · JPL
574899	2011 BD_{133}	—	January 29, 2011	Kitt Peak	Spacewatch	·	2.7 km	MPC · JPL
574900	2011 BO_{135}	—	January 29, 2011	Mount Lemmon	Mount Lemmon Survey	·	2.8 km	MPC · JPL

== 574901–575000 ==
back to top

Designation			Discovery			Properties		Ref
Permanent	Provisional	Named after	Date	Site	Discoverer(s)	Category	Diam.	Ref
574901	2011 BH_{152}	—	September 29, 2009	Kitt Peak	Spacewatch	·	1.4 km	MPC · JPL
574902	2011 BP_{153}	—	December 19, 2003	Kitt Peak	Spacewatch	·	1.2 km	MPC · JPL
574903	2011 BU_{154}	—	January 14, 2011	Kitt Peak	Spacewatch	·	1.1 km	MPC · JPL
574904	2011 BL_{164}	—	December 27, 2006	Mount Lemmon	Mount Lemmon Survey	·	1.2 km	MPC · JPL
574905	2011 BU_{164}	—	December 21, 2006	Kitt Peak	L. H. Wasserman, M. W. Buie	·	990 m	MPC · JPL
574906	2011 BH_{165}	—	October 18, 2009	Mount Lemmon	Mount Lemmon Survey	THM	1.6 km	MPC · JPL
574907	2011 BW_{167}	—	September 17, 2009	Kitt Peak	Spacewatch	·	1.4 km	MPC · JPL
574908	2011 BC_{169}	—	February 8, 2011	Mount Lemmon	Mount Lemmon Survey	ADE	1.3 km	MPC · JPL
574909	2011 BV_{170}	—	February 5, 2011	Haleakala	Pan-STARRS 1	·	1.0 km	MPC · JPL
574910	2011 BR_{171}	—	January 27, 2011	Kitt Peak	Spacewatch	EUP	2.7 km	MPC · JPL
574911	2011 BZ_{172}	—	February 7, 2011	Mount Lemmon	Mount Lemmon Survey	·	1.3 km	MPC · JPL
574912	2011 BG_{173}	—	January 18, 2015	Haleakala	Pan-STARRS 1	·	1.2 km	MPC · JPL
574913	2011 BV_{175}	—	February 5, 2011	Haleakala	Pan-STARRS 1	·	1.4 km	MPC · JPL
574914	2011 BE_{183}	—	January 24, 2015	Haleakala	Pan-STARRS 1	·	1.1 km	MPC · JPL
574915	2011 BF_{185}	—	January 28, 2015	Haleakala	Pan-STARRS 1	PHO	670 m	MPC · JPL
574916	2011 BC_{188}	—	December 27, 2014	Mount Lemmon	Mount Lemmon Survey	·	1.4 km	MPC · JPL
574917	2011 BK_{194}	—	January 16, 2015	Mount Lemmon	Mount Lemmon Survey	·	1.4 km	MPC · JPL
574918	2011 BL_{194}	—	January 23, 2011	Mount Lemmon	Mount Lemmon Survey	·	1.1 km	MPC · JPL
574919	2011 BO_{194}	—	January 29, 2011	Mount Lemmon	Mount Lemmon Survey	·	980 m	MPC · JPL
574920	2011 BA_{200}	—	January 27, 2011	Mount Lemmon	Mount Lemmon Survey	·	820 m	MPC · JPL
574921	2011 BC_{201}	—	January 28, 2011	Kitt Peak	Spacewatch	·	990 m	MPC · JPL
574922	2011 CR_{2}	—	November 23, 2009	Kitt Peak	Spacewatch	3:2	4.8 km	MPC · JPL
574923	2011 CU_{5}	—	January 13, 2002	Palomar	NEAT	JUN	990 m	MPC · JPL
574924	2011 CS_{9}	—	January 13, 2011	Kitt Peak	Spacewatch	·	1.3 km	MPC · JPL
574925	2011 CU_{12}	—	October 23, 2009	Mount Lemmon	Mount Lemmon Survey	·	1.5 km	MPC · JPL
574926	2011 CY_{16}	—	February 4, 2011	Catalina	CSS	·	1.8 km	MPC · JPL
574927	2011 CD_{17}	—	February 4, 2011	Mayhill-ISON	L. Elenin	·	1.8 km	MPC · JPL
574928	2011 CP_{34}	—	February 4, 2011	Catalina	CSS	·	1.7 km	MPC · JPL
574929	2011 CL_{36}	—	April 1, 2003	Apache Point	SDSS Collaboration	·	1.2 km	MPC · JPL
574930	2011 CO_{53}	—	March 22, 2003	Ondřejov	L. Kotková	·	1.2 km	MPC · JPL
574931	2011 CW_{56}	—	February 8, 2011	Mount Lemmon	Mount Lemmon Survey	·	800 m	MPC · JPL
574932	2011 CC_{61}	—	January 28, 2011	Mount Lemmon	Mount Lemmon Survey	·	1.3 km	MPC · JPL
574933	2011 CL_{65}	—	April 21, 2003	Kitt Peak	Spacewatch	·	1.6 km	MPC · JPL
574934	2011 CS_{78}	—	February 10, 2011	Mount Lemmon	Mount Lemmon Survey	ADE	1.6 km	MPC · JPL
574935	2011 CO_{82}	—	February 22, 2002	Palomar	NEAT	·	1.5 km	MPC · JPL
574936	2011 CC_{83}	—	February 10, 2011	Mount Lemmon	Mount Lemmon Survey	·	1.4 km	MPC · JPL
574937	2011 CA_{84}	—	February 26, 2011	Mount Lemmon	Mount Lemmon Survey	·	1.4 km	MPC · JPL
574938	2011 CP_{86}	—	February 10, 2011	Mount Lemmon	Mount Lemmon Survey	EUN	890 m	MPC · JPL
574939	2011 CO_{87}	—	February 5, 2011	Haleakala	Pan-STARRS 1	LIX	3.9 km	MPC · JPL
574940	2011 CC_{93}	—	October 24, 2009	Kitt Peak	Spacewatch	·	1.3 km	MPC · JPL
574941	2011 CR_{93}	—	September 12, 2004	Kitt Peak	Spacewatch	·	1.5 km	MPC · JPL
574942	2011 CG_{102}	—	March 6, 2011	Mount Lemmon	Mount Lemmon Survey	NEM	1.8 km	MPC · JPL
574943	2011 CM_{106}	—	February 25, 2011	Mount Lemmon	Mount Lemmon Survey	·	1.3 km	MPC · JPL
574944	2011 CC_{121}	—	February 8, 2011	Mount Lemmon	Mount Lemmon Survey	·	1.5 km	MPC · JPL
574945	2011 CG_{122}	—	August 12, 2013	Haleakala	Pan-STARRS 1	·	870 m	MPC · JPL
574946	2011 CU_{122}	—	February 4, 2011	Catalina	CSS	·	1.6 km	MPC · JPL
574947	2011 CH_{123}	—	February 10, 2011	Mount Lemmon	Mount Lemmon Survey	·	1.4 km	MPC · JPL
574948	2011 CU_{127}	—	February 8, 2011	Mount Lemmon	Mount Lemmon Survey	JUN	1.1 km	MPC · JPL
574949	2011 CP_{128}	—	February 8, 2011	Mount Lemmon	Mount Lemmon Survey	·	820 m	MPC · JPL
574950	2011 DD_{6}	—	December 6, 2005	Catalina	CSS	·	1.9 km	MPC · JPL
574951	2011 DC_{14}	—	February 13, 2011	Mount Lemmon	Mount Lemmon Survey	·	1.0 km	MPC · JPL
574952	2011 DU_{21}	—	September 26, 2000	Haleakala	NEAT	HNS	1.7 km	MPC · JPL
574953	2011 DT_{22}	—	February 11, 2011	Mount Lemmon	Mount Lemmon Survey	·	1.4 km	MPC · JPL
574954	2011 DR_{29}	—	March 26, 2007	Mount Lemmon	Mount Lemmon Survey	MIS	1.8 km	MPC · JPL
574955	2011 DD_{33}	—	October 2, 2005	Mount Lemmon	Mount Lemmon Survey	·	1.1 km	MPC · JPL
574956	2011 DF_{33}	—	February 25, 2011	Mount Lemmon	Mount Lemmon Survey	·	1.2 km	MPC · JPL
574957	2011 DX_{34}	—	September 6, 2008	Kitt Peak	Spacewatch	·	1.5 km	MPC · JPL
574958	2011 DZ_{38}	—	February 25, 2011	Mount Lemmon	Mount Lemmon Survey	·	1.1 km	MPC · JPL
574959	2011 DH_{39}	—	October 23, 2009	Mount Lemmon	Mount Lemmon Survey	NEM	1.8 km	MPC · JPL
574960	2011 DO_{40}	—	March 2, 1995	Kitt Peak	Spacewatch	·	1.4 km	MPC · JPL
574961	2011 DR_{46}	—	February 26, 2011	Mount Lemmon	Mount Lemmon Survey	·	1.3 km	MPC · JPL
574962	2011 DW_{48}	—	February 26, 2011	Mount Lemmon	Mount Lemmon Survey	AGN	1.2 km	MPC · JPL
574963	2011 DB_{54}	—	April 14, 2016	Mount Lemmon	Mount Lemmon Survey	·	1.2 km	MPC · JPL
574964	2011 DD_{55}	—	February 25, 2011	Mount Lemmon	Mount Lemmon Survey	·	1.6 km	MPC · JPL
574965	2011 DH_{56}	—	February 25, 2011	Mount Lemmon	Mount Lemmon Survey	·	1.4 km	MPC · JPL
574966	2011 DP_{58}	—	February 26, 2011	Mount Lemmon	Mount Lemmon Survey	·	460 m	MPC · JPL
574967	2011 DQ_{58}	—	February 25, 2011	Mount Lemmon	Mount Lemmon Survey	AGN	890 m	MPC · JPL
574968	2011 EQ_{5}	—	February 10, 2011	Mount Lemmon	Mount Lemmon Survey	·	1.5 km	MPC · JPL
574969	2011 ED_{13}	—	September 16, 2009	Kitt Peak	Spacewatch	DOR	1.6 km	MPC · JPL
574970	2011 ER_{18}	—	February 10, 2011	Mount Lemmon	Mount Lemmon Survey	·	1.5 km	MPC · JPL
574971	2011 EK_{20}	—	March 6, 2011	Dauban	C. Rinner, Kugel, F.	(18466)	3.0 km	MPC · JPL
574972	2011 EV_{27}	—	February 23, 2011	Kitt Peak	Spacewatch	·	1.6 km	MPC · JPL
574973	2011 EK_{28}	—	September 17, 2009	Kitt Peak	Spacewatch	·	1.8 km	MPC · JPL
574974	2011 EH_{30}	—	October 29, 2010	Mount Lemmon	Mount Lemmon Survey	·	1.9 km	MPC · JPL
574975	2011 ES_{36}	—	August 21, 2008	Kitt Peak	Spacewatch	·	1.8 km	MPC · JPL
574976	2011 EH_{43}	—	December 20, 2001	Kitt Peak	Spacewatch	·	1.6 km	MPC · JPL
574977	2011 EB_{46}	—	September 25, 2008	Kitt Peak	Spacewatch	·	1.9 km	MPC · JPL
574978	2011 EF_{49}	—	April 13, 2004	Kitt Peak	Spacewatch	V	540 m	MPC · JPL
574979	2011 ED_{50}	—	February 25, 2011	Kitt Peak	Spacewatch	·	1.5 km	MPC · JPL
574980	2011 EF_{51}	—	April 20, 1998	Socorro	LINEAR	·	2.0 km	MPC · JPL
574981	2011 EX_{51}	—	March 9, 2011	Mount Lemmon	Mount Lemmon Survey	·	1.5 km	MPC · JPL
574982	2011 EB_{54}	—	March 9, 2011	Kitt Peak	Spacewatch	MRX	1.0 km	MPC · JPL
574983	2011 EK_{55}	—	April 13, 2002	Kitt Peak	Spacewatch	·	1.6 km	MPC · JPL
574984	2011 EK_{57}	—	March 12, 2011	Mount Lemmon	Mount Lemmon Survey	·	1.7 km	MPC · JPL
574985	2011 EP_{64}	—	March 9, 2011	Mount Lemmon	Mount Lemmon Survey	·	1.5 km	MPC · JPL
574986	2011 ES_{64}	—	September 15, 2009	Kitt Peak	Spacewatch	·	1.7 km	MPC · JPL
574987	2011 EA_{68}	—	September 18, 2009	Mount Lemmon	Mount Lemmon Survey	·	1.6 km	MPC · JPL
574988	2011 EM_{72}	—	February 8, 2011	Mount Lemmon	Mount Lemmon Survey	EUN	1.3 km	MPC · JPL
574989	2011 EE_{76}	—	January 28, 2011	Kitt Peak	Spacewatch	·	1.6 km	MPC · JPL
574990	2011 EJ_{82}	—	January 30, 2011	Kitt Peak	Spacewatch	EUN	960 m	MPC · JPL
574991	2011 ES_{86}	—	April 12, 2002	Palomar	NEAT	GEF	1.6 km	MPC · JPL
574992	2011 EZ_{91}	—	December 29, 2014	Haleakala	Pan-STARRS 1	·	1.6 km	MPC · JPL
574993	2011 EE_{92}	—	March 4, 2011	Mount Lemmon	Mount Lemmon Survey	·	1 km	MPC · JPL
574994	2011 EH_{92}	—	March 10, 2011	Mount Lemmon	Mount Lemmon Survey	HNS	840 m	MPC · JPL
574995	2011 ES_{92}	—	January 17, 2015	Haleakala	Pan-STARRS 1	JUN	1.0 km	MPC · JPL
574996	2011 EC_{94}	—	March 10, 2011	Kitt Peak	Spacewatch	·	1.7 km	MPC · JPL
574997	2011 EF_{98}	—	January 25, 2015	Haleakala	Pan-STARRS 1	·	1.9 km	MPC · JPL
574998	2011 EM_{98}	—	May 22, 2012	Kitt Peak	Spacewatch	·	2.7 km	MPC · JPL
574999	2011 EL_{99}	—	May 23, 2012	Mount Lemmon	Mount Lemmon Survey	·	1.6 km	MPC · JPL
575000	2011 ER_{100}	—	March 14, 2011	Mount Lemmon	Mount Lemmon Survey	·	1.4 km	MPC · JPL

back to top

== Meaning of names ==
As minor planet discoveries are confirmed, they are given a permanent number by the IAU's Minor Planet Center (MPC), and the discoverers can then submit names for them, following the IAU's naming conventions. The list below concerns those minor planets in the specified number-range that have received names, and explains the meanings of those names.

Official naming citations of newly named small Solar System bodies are approved and published in a bulletin by IAU's Working Group for Small Bodies Nomenclature (WGSBN). Before May 2021, citations were published in MPC's Minor Planet Circulars for many decades. Recent citations can also be found on the JPL Small-Body Database (SBDB). Until his death in 2016, German astronomer Lutz D. Schmadel compiled these citations into the Dictionary of Minor Planet Names (DMP) and regularly updated the collection.

Based on Paul Herget's The Names of the Minor Planets, Schmadel also researched the unclear origin of numerous asteroids, most of which had been named prior to World War II. This article incorporates text from this source, which is in the public domain: SBDB New namings may only be added to this list below after official publication as the preannouncement of names is condemned. The WGSBN publishes a comprehensive guideline for the naming rules of non-cometary small Solar System bodies.

Named minor planet	Provisional	This minor planet was named for...	Ref · Catalog
574300 Curelaru	2010 GX_{202}	Lucian Curelaru (born 1976), a Romanian amateur astronomer and software developer, who works with the European Near-Earth Asteroids Research. His interests include data mining from asteroid astrometry and binary stars observations.	IAU · 574300
574506 Sopronilíceum	2010 RF_{97}	Lutheran Lyceum in Sopron (founded 1557), one of the oldest grammar schools in Hungary and alma mater of many prominent people in science, the church, education, the arts, and public life.	IAU · 574506
574546 Kondorgusztáv	2010 RP_{180}	Gusztáv Kondor (1825–1897) was a Hungarian astronomer, mathematician, and geodesist, as well as a member of the Hungarian Academy of Sciences. His astronomical research included celestial mechanics, astrometry and astronomical geolocation.	IAU · 574546
574548 Plume	2010 RQ_{183}	René Plume, Canadian Professor of physics and astronomy at the University of Calgary.	IAU · 574548
574570 Khabibullin	2010 RA_{194}	Shaukat Khabibullin, Russian astronomer and professor at the Kazan Federal University.	IAU · 574570
574635 Jánossy	2010 TK_{81}	Dénes Jánossy (1926–2005), a Hungarian ornithologist, paleontologist and university professor.	IAU · 574635
574691 Horgerantal	2010 UB_{68}	Antal Horger (1872–1946), a Hungarian linguist, university professor and a full member of the Hungarian Academy of Sciences.	IAU · 574691
574742 Annatsybuleva	2010 VN_{137}	Anna Tsybuleva (born 1990), Russian pianist who was a First Prize Winner of the 2015 Leeds International Piano Competition.	IAU · 574742
