= Dmitry Chestnov =

Russian astronomer

Minor planets discovered: 18
see § List of discovered minor planets

Dmitry Nikolayevich Chestnov (Russian: Дмитрий Николаевич Честнов) is a Russian astronomer, observer and photometrist of comets and discoverer of minor planets. He lives in Saransk, the capital city of the Republic of Mordovia, Russia.

He is credited by the Minor Planet Center with the discovery of several minor planets during 2009–2010, all in collaboration with Russian astronomer and colleague Artyom Novichonok at Tzec Maun Observatory (H10) in Mayhill, New Mexico.

According to the Comet Observation database (COBS), which is maintained by the Slovenian Črni Vrh Observatory, Dmitry Chestnov has submitted dozens of observations of comets under his user code "CHE09". Several cometary observations, including those of the hyperbolic comet C/2009 O4 (HILL) he took at Tzec Maun's southern station (D25) in Pingelly, Western Australia. He also participated in the recovery of periodic comet 246P/NEAT at the Kislovodsk Mountain Astronomical Station of Pulkovo Observatory (D20) in November 2011 (M.P.C. 72435). He has published a large number of secular lightcurves of comets on his Comet Light Curve Refinement Program (LiCuRG) website.

His Apollo and Amor near-Earth object observations, published in MPC's Minor Planet Electronic Circulars during 2009–2011, include 2011 VW_{5} (MPC), 2011 AO_{52} (MPC), 2010 WB (MPC), 2009 OC (MPC), 2010 RP_{80} (MPC), and 2010 JE88 (MPC).

== List of discovered minor planets ==
228165 Mezentsev	26 September 2009	list^{[A]}
231649 Korotkiy	17 November 2009	list^{[A]}
(264156) 2009 WV_{5}	17 November 2009	list^{[A]}
(269568) 2009 WS_{105}	25 November 2009	list^{[A]}
274981 Petrsu	12 October 2009	list^{[A]}
(279340) 2009 YM_{6}	17 December 2009	list^{[A]}
(296747) 2009 UB_{1}	17 October 2009	list^{[A]}
(296818) 2009 WW_{5}	17 November 2009	list^{[A]}

(328734) 2009 UA_{1}	17 October 2009	list^{[A]}
(331056) 2009 WX	17 November 2009	list^{[A]}
(369400) 2009 WS_{7}	18 November 2009	list^{[A]}
(379283) 2009 VF_{1}	9 November 2009	list^{[A]}
(407154) 2009 UH_{2}	18 October 2009	list^{[A]}
(407228) 2009 WY_{10}	20 November 2009	list^{[A]}
(407231) 2009 WA_{25}	21 November 2009	list^{[A]}
(441872) 2010 AC_{40}	9 January 2010	list^{[A]}

(457939) 2009 VG_{1}	9 November 2009	list^{[A]}
(465786) 2010 AU_{60}	11 January 2010	list^{[A]}
Co-discovery made with:^{A} A. Novichonok

== See also ==
- List of minor planet discoverers § D. Chestnov
