= List of minor planets: 407001–408000 =

The following is a partial list of minor planets, running from minor-planet number 407001 through 408000, inclusive. The primary data for this and other partial lists is based on JPL's "Small-Body Orbital Elements" and data available from the Minor Planet Center. Critical list information is also provided by the MPC, unless otherwise specified from Lowell Observatory. A detailed description of the table's columns and additional sources are given on the main page including a complete list of every page in this series, and a statistical break-up on the dynamical classification of minor planets.

Also see the summary list of all named bodies in numerical and alphabetical order, and the corresponding naming citations for the number range of this particular list. New namings may only be added to this list after official publication, as the preannouncement of names is condemned by the Working Group for Small Bodies Nomenclature of the International Astronomical Union.

Near-Earth obj.	MBA (inner)	MBA (outer)	Centaur
Mars-crosser	MBA (middle)	Jupiter trojan	Trans-Neptunian obj.
Unclassified

== 407001–407100 ==
Designation			Discovery			Properties		Ref
Permanent	Provisional	Named after	Date	Site	Discoverer(s)	Category	Diam.	Ref
407001	2009 RF_{58}	—	September 15, 2009	Kitt Peak	Spacewatch	·	2.4 km	MPC · JPL
407002	2009 RS_{58}	—	September 15, 2009	Kitt Peak	Spacewatch	·	4.6 km	MPC · JPL
407003	2009 RF_{59}	—	September 15, 2009	Kitt Peak	Spacewatch	EOS	2.6 km	MPC · JPL
407004	2009 RH_{62}	—	September 15, 2009	Kitt Peak	Spacewatch	·	2.6 km	MPC · JPL
407005	2009 RT_{65}	—	September 15, 2009	Kitt Peak	Spacewatch	·	2.7 km	MPC · JPL
407006	2009 RS_{72}	—	September 15, 2009	Kitt Peak	Spacewatch	·	4.3 km	MPC · JPL
407007	2009 RT_{73}	—	September 15, 2009	Kitt Peak	Spacewatch	·	2.7 km	MPC · JPL
407008	2009 RD_{74}	—	September 15, 2009	Kitt Peak	Spacewatch	·	3.0 km	MPC · JPL
407009	2009 RZ_{75}	—	September 15, 2009	Kitt Peak	Spacewatch	·	1.8 km	MPC · JPL
407010	2009 SV_{5}	—	September 16, 2009	Kitt Peak	Spacewatch	·	1.3 km	MPC · JPL
407011	2009 SZ_{5}	—	September 16, 2009	Kitt Peak	Spacewatch	·	2.8 km	MPC · JPL
407012	2009 SW_{14}	—	September 18, 2009	Bisei SG Center	BATTeRS	EOS	2.3 km	MPC · JPL
407013	2009 SZ_{14}	—	September 19, 2009	Catalina	CSS	H	510 m	MPC · JPL
407014	2009 SP_{15}	—	September 19, 2009	Bisei SG Center	BATTeRS	NAE	2.9 km	MPC · JPL
407015	2009 SL_{20}	—	September 22, 2009	Marly	P. Kocher	EOS	2.1 km	MPC · JPL
407016 Danielerdag	2009 SZ_{21}	Danielerdag	September 18, 2009	Zelenchukskaya Stn112435	T. V. Krjačko	THB	3.4 km	MPC · JPL
407017	2009 SC_{25}	—	August 17, 2009	Kitt Peak	Spacewatch	·	1.2 km	MPC · JPL
407018	2009 SK_{26}	—	September 16, 2009	Kitt Peak	Spacewatch	·	3.6 km	MPC · JPL
407019	2009 SH_{27}	—	April 20, 2007	Kitt Peak	Spacewatch	·	2.8 km	MPC · JPL
407020	2009 SA_{28}	—	September 16, 2009	Kitt Peak	Spacewatch	THM	2.0 km	MPC · JPL
407021	2009 SN_{35}	—	September 16, 2009	Kitt Peak	Spacewatch	EOS	1.9 km	MPC · JPL
407022	2009 SR_{37}	—	September 16, 2009	Kitt Peak	Spacewatch	·	2.6 km	MPC · JPL
407023	2009 SG_{40}	—	September 16, 2009	Kitt Peak	Spacewatch	EOS	1.6 km	MPC · JPL
407024	2009 SL_{40}	—	September 16, 2009	Kitt Peak	Spacewatch	·	3.3 km	MPC · JPL
407025	2009 SS_{40}	—	September 16, 2009	Kitt Peak	Spacewatch	·	2.2 km	MPC · JPL
407026	2009 SK_{43}	—	September 16, 2009	Kitt Peak	Spacewatch	·	2.7 km	MPC · JPL
407027	2009 SG_{44}	—	September 16, 2009	Kitt Peak	Spacewatch	·	3.2 km	MPC · JPL
407028	2009 SV_{46}	—	September 16, 2009	Kitt Peak	Spacewatch	H	520 m	MPC · JPL
407029	2009 SR_{47}	—	September 16, 2009	Kitt Peak	Spacewatch	·	2.9 km	MPC · JPL
407030	2009 ST_{51}	—	September 17, 2009	Mount Lemmon	Mount Lemmon Survey	·	2.4 km	MPC · JPL
407031	2009 SW_{53}	—	September 17, 2009	Kitt Peak	Spacewatch	·	2.5 km	MPC · JPL
407032	2009 ST_{54}	—	September 17, 2009	Mount Lemmon	Mount Lemmon Survey	·	2.0 km	MPC · JPL
407033	2009 SC_{56}	—	September 17, 2009	Kitt Peak	Spacewatch	·	3.5 km	MPC · JPL
407034	2009 SY_{64}	—	September 17, 2009	Mount Lemmon	Mount Lemmon Survey	·	1.8 km	MPC · JPL
407035	2009 SA_{69}	—	September 17, 2009	Kitt Peak	Spacewatch	EOS	2.0 km	MPC · JPL
407036	2009 SM_{72}	—	September 17, 2009	Mount Lemmon	Mount Lemmon Survey	·	2.5 km	MPC · JPL
407037	2009 SQ_{72}	—	September 17, 2009	Mount Lemmon	Mount Lemmon Survey	·	1.9 km	MPC · JPL
407038	2009 SL_{81}	—	August 15, 2009	Kitt Peak	Spacewatch	EOS	2.0 km	MPC · JPL
407039	2009 SX_{94}	—	September 19, 2009	Mount Lemmon	Mount Lemmon Survey	EMA	2.5 km	MPC · JPL
407040	2009 SD_{98}	—	September 20, 2009	Kitt Peak	Spacewatch	·	3.1 km	MPC · JPL
407041 Olganevskaya	2009 SQ_{99}	Olganevskaya	September 20, 2009	Vitebsk	Nevski, V.	TIR	2.9 km	MPC · JPL
407042	2009 SF_{102}	—	September 21, 2009	Mount Lemmon	Mount Lemmon Survey	·	2.8 km	MPC · JPL
407043	2009 SM_{107}	—	September 16, 2009	Kitt Peak	Spacewatch	·	2.6 km	MPC · JPL
407044	2009 SM_{110}	—	April 9, 1996	Kitt Peak	Spacewatch	EOS	2.4 km	MPC · JPL
407045	2009 SU_{110}	—	September 18, 2009	Bergisch Gladbach	W. Bickel	·	2.6 km	MPC · JPL
407046	2009 SG_{111}	—	October 8, 2004	Kitt Peak	Spacewatch	·	3.0 km	MPC · JPL
407047	2009 SP_{111}	—	April 18, 2007	Kitt Peak	Spacewatch	·	3.3 km	MPC · JPL
407048	2009 SM_{113}	—	September 18, 2009	Kitt Peak	Spacewatch	·	1.9 km	MPC · JPL
407049	2009 SR_{123}	—	September 18, 2009	Kitt Peak	Spacewatch	·	2.0 km	MPC · JPL
407050	2009 SF_{132}	—	September 18, 2009	Kitt Peak	Spacewatch	·	1.8 km	MPC · JPL
407051	2009 SL_{133}	—	February 2, 2006	Kitt Peak	Spacewatch	·	2.7 km	MPC · JPL
407052	2009 SZ_{133}	—	September 18, 2009	Kitt Peak	Spacewatch	EOS	2.1 km	MPC · JPL
407053	2009 SY_{136}	—	September 18, 2009	Kitt Peak	Spacewatch	·	2.5 km	MPC · JPL
407054	2009 SR_{137}	—	September 18, 2009	Kitt Peak	Spacewatch	THM	1.7 km	MPC · JPL
407055	2009 SR_{138}	—	September 18, 2009	Kitt Peak	Spacewatch	·	3.2 km	MPC · JPL
407056	2009 SY_{143}	—	September 19, 2009	Kitt Peak	Spacewatch	·	2.0 km	MPC · JPL
407057	2009 SA_{145}	—	September 19, 2009	Mount Lemmon	Mount Lemmon Survey	·	2.0 km	MPC · JPL
407058	2009 SF_{151}	—	November 17, 2004	Campo Imperatore	CINEOS	·	3.6 km	MPC · JPL
407059	2009 SP_{152}	—	September 20, 2009	Mount Lemmon	Mount Lemmon Survey	·	2.5 km	MPC · JPL
407060	2009 SK_{154}	—	September 20, 2009	Kitt Peak	Spacewatch	·	4.5 km	MPC · JPL
407061	2009 SJ_{157}	—	September 20, 2009	Kitt Peak	Spacewatch	THM	1.9 km	MPC · JPL
407062	2009 SV_{164}	—	September 21, 2009	Kitt Peak	Spacewatch	·	2.8 km	MPC · JPL
407063	2009 SB_{165}	—	September 21, 2009	Kitt Peak	Spacewatch	·	3.5 km	MPC · JPL
407064	2009 SO_{166}	—	September 22, 2009	Mount Lemmon	Mount Lemmon Survey	·	2.6 km	MPC · JPL
407065	2009 SC_{167}	—	September 23, 2009	Kitt Peak	Spacewatch	·	2.1 km	MPC · JPL
407066	2009 SA_{169}	—	January 6, 2006	Anderson Mesa	LONEOS	·	4.5 km	MPC · JPL
407067	2009 SF_{169}	—	January 28, 2007	Mount Lemmon	Mount Lemmon Survey	·	2.2 km	MPC · JPL
407068	2009 SF_{173}	—	September 18, 2009	Kitt Peak	Spacewatch	EOS	2.2 km	MPC · JPL
407069	2009 SV_{183}	—	September 21, 2009	Kitt Peak	Spacewatch	·	2.9 km	MPC · JPL
407070	2009 SH_{192}	—	September 22, 2009	Kitt Peak	Spacewatch	·	2.7 km	MPC · JPL
407071	2009 SK_{192}	—	March 9, 2007	Kitt Peak	Spacewatch	·	1.9 km	MPC · JPL
407072	2009 SM_{194}	—	September 12, 2009	Kitt Peak	Spacewatch	·	2.5 km	MPC · JPL
407073	2009 SV_{197}	—	March 12, 2007	Kitt Peak	Spacewatch	·	2.4 km	MPC · JPL
407074	2009 SY_{197}	—	September 22, 2009	Kitt Peak	Spacewatch	·	2.7 km	MPC · JPL
407075	2009 SV_{198}	—	September 22, 2009	Kitt Peak	Spacewatch	·	3.0 km	MPC · JPL
407076	2009 SV_{205}	—	April 16, 2007	Mount Lemmon	Mount Lemmon Survey	·	2.4 km	MPC · JPL
407077	2009 SM_{207}	—	September 15, 2009	Kitt Peak	Spacewatch	·	3.8 km	MPC · JPL
407078	2009 SN_{208}	—	September 23, 2009	Kitt Peak	Spacewatch	·	2.5 km	MPC · JPL
407079	2009 SX_{211}	—	September 23, 2009	Kitt Peak	Spacewatch	THM	2.0 km	MPC · JPL
407080	2009 SE_{216}	—	September 24, 2009	Kitt Peak	Spacewatch	·	1.6 km	MPC · JPL
407081	2009 SH_{217}	—	September 24, 2009	Kitt Peak	Spacewatch	·	2.5 km	MPC · JPL
407082	2009 SL_{222}	—	September 25, 2009	Mount Lemmon	Mount Lemmon Survey	·	2.0 km	MPC · JPL
407083	2009 ST_{228}	—	August 15, 2009	Kitt Peak	Spacewatch	·	3.4 km	MPC · JPL
407084	2009 SV_{234}	—	July 31, 2009	Catalina	CSS	·	2.7 km	MPC · JPL
407085	2009 SZ_{244}	—	September 19, 2009	Kitt Peak	Spacewatch	·	4.0 km	MPC · JPL
407086	2009 SO_{254}	—	September 23, 2009	Kitt Peak	Spacewatch	·	2.7 km	MPC · JPL
407087	2009 ST_{254}	—	September 17, 2009	Kitt Peak	Spacewatch	EOS	1.7 km	MPC · JPL
407088	2009 SG_{255}	—	September 16, 2009	Siding Spring	SSS	·	3.1 km	MPC · JPL
407089	2009 SH_{259}	—	August 18, 2009	Kitt Peak	Spacewatch	·	3.1 km	MPC · JPL
407090	2009 SZ_{259}	—	September 13, 2004	Kitt Peak	Spacewatch	KOR	1.3 km	MPC · JPL
407091	2009 SF_{264}	—	September 23, 2009	Mount Lemmon	Mount Lemmon Survey	·	2.7 km	MPC · JPL
407092	2009 SF_{268}	—	September 24, 2009	Kitt Peak	Spacewatch	EOS	2.2 km	MPC · JPL
407093	2009 SN_{273}	—	February 21, 2007	Mount Lemmon	Mount Lemmon Survey	·	2.4 km	MPC · JPL
407094	2009 SB_{274}	—	September 25, 2009	Kitt Peak	Spacewatch	·	3.0 km	MPC · JPL
407095	2009 SB_{275}	—	September 25, 2009	Kitt Peak	Spacewatch	EOS	2.1 km	MPC · JPL
407096	2009 SE_{276}	—	September 25, 2009	Kitt Peak	Spacewatch	·	1.9 km	MPC · JPL
407097	2009 SW_{280}	—	September 17, 2009	Kitt Peak	Spacewatch	EOS	2.0 km	MPC · JPL
407098	2009 SY_{280}	—	September 25, 2009	Kitt Peak	Spacewatch	·	2.2 km	MPC · JPL
407099	2009 SY_{282}	—	September 25, 2009	Kitt Peak	Spacewatch	·	2.9 km	MPC · JPL
407100	2009 SY_{283}	—	September 17, 2009	Kitt Peak	Spacewatch	·	2.0 km	MPC · JPL

== 407101–407200 ==
back to top

Designation			Discovery			Properties		Ref
Permanent	Provisional	Named after	Date	Site	Discoverer(s)	Category	Diam.	Ref
407101	2009 SL_{284}	—	September 25, 2009	Catalina	CSS	·	3.3 km	MPC · JPL
407102	2009 SO_{285}	—	August 27, 2009	Kitt Peak	Spacewatch	·	2.5 km	MPC · JPL
407103	2009 SF_{287}	—	September 25, 2009	Kitt Peak	Spacewatch	EOS	2.2 km	MPC · JPL
407104	2009 SK_{287}	—	September 25, 2009	Kitt Peak	Spacewatch	·	3.1 km	MPC · JPL
407105	2009 SJ_{288}	—	September 25, 2009	Kitt Peak	Spacewatch	·	2.5 km	MPC · JPL
407106	2009 SY_{288}	—	September 18, 2009	Kitt Peak	Spacewatch	·	2.3 km	MPC · JPL
407107	2009 SR_{289}	—	September 25, 2009	Kitt Peak	Spacewatch	·	3.1 km	MPC · JPL
407108	2009 SS_{292}	—	September 26, 2009	Kitt Peak	Spacewatch	·	3.0 km	MPC · JPL
407109	2009 SS_{294}	—	September 27, 2009	Catalina	CSS	·	3.3 km	MPC · JPL
407110	2009 SY_{297}	—	September 28, 2009	Mount Lemmon	Mount Lemmon Survey	EOS	1.7 km	MPC · JPL
407111	2009 SN_{299}	—	September 29, 2009	Mount Lemmon	Mount Lemmon Survey	LIX	5.8 km	MPC · JPL
407112	2009 SX_{300}	—	September 16, 2009	Kitt Peak	Spacewatch	·	1.6 km	MPC · JPL
407113	2009 SM_{304}	—	July 31, 2009	Kitt Peak	Spacewatch	EOS	2.9 km	MPC · JPL
407114	2009 SZ_{304}	—	September 17, 2009	Kitt Peak	Spacewatch	EOS	1.9 km	MPC · JPL
407115	2009 SA_{307}	—	September 17, 2009	Kitt Peak	Spacewatch	·	3.2 km	MPC · JPL
407116	2009 SC_{308}	—	September 17, 2009	Mount Lemmon	Mount Lemmon Survey	·	2.4 km	MPC · JPL
407117	2009 SL_{308}	—	August 27, 2009	Kitt Peak	Spacewatch	HYG	2.3 km	MPC · JPL
407118	2009 SE_{317}	—	August 28, 2009	Kitt Peak	Spacewatch	·	1.9 km	MPC · JPL
407119	2009 SY_{317}	—	September 20, 2009	Kitt Peak	Spacewatch	·	2.6 km	MPC · JPL
407120	2009 SO_{326}	—	September 30, 2009	Mount Lemmon	Mount Lemmon Survey	·	3.1 km	MPC · JPL
407121	2009 SW_{326}	—	September 18, 2009	Catalina	CSS	·	4.0 km	MPC · JPL
407122	2009 SD_{327}	—	September 28, 2009	Catalina	CSS	·	4.1 km	MPC · JPL
407123	2009 SH_{328}	—	September 26, 2009	Kitt Peak	Spacewatch	BRA	1.6 km	MPC · JPL
407124	2009 SA_{329}	—	September 16, 2009	Catalina	CSS	·	2.5 km	MPC · JPL
407125	2009 SO_{334}	—	September 25, 2009	Catalina	CSS	EOS	2.7 km	MPC · JPL
407126	2009 SH_{340}	—	September 20, 2009	Kitt Peak	Spacewatch	·	2.5 km	MPC · JPL
407127	2009 SO_{340}	—	September 20, 2009	Kitt Peak	Spacewatch	EOS	1.7 km	MPC · JPL
407128	2009 SC_{342}	—	September 16, 2009	Kitt Peak	Spacewatch	·	2.6 km	MPC · JPL
407129	2009 SL_{350}	—	September 23, 2009	Mount Lemmon	Mount Lemmon Survey	·	4.0 km	MPC · JPL
407130	2009 SO_{350}	—	September 26, 2009	Kitt Peak	Spacewatch	·	1.8 km	MPC · JPL
407131	2009 SH_{355}	—	September 18, 2009	Mount Lemmon	Mount Lemmon Survey	THM	1.9 km	MPC · JPL
407132	2009 SH_{357}	—	September 21, 2009	Mount Lemmon	Mount Lemmon Survey	·	2.8 km	MPC · JPL
407133	2009 SF_{359}	—	September 21, 2009	Mount Lemmon	Mount Lemmon Survey	·	2.7 km	MPC · JPL
407134	2009 SF_{362}	—	September 20, 2009	Mount Lemmon	Mount Lemmon Survey	·	2.2 km	MPC · JPL
407135	2009 SJ_{362}	—	September 21, 2009	Mount Lemmon	Mount Lemmon Survey	·	3.2 km	MPC · JPL
407136	2009 SD_{363}	—	August 17, 2009	Kitt Peak	Spacewatch	·	2.1 km	MPC · JPL
407137	2009 SH_{363}	—	September 16, 2009	Kitt Peak	Spacewatch	·	4.3 km	MPC · JPL
407138	2009 SW_{366}	—	October 13, 2004	Kitt Peak	Spacewatch	EOS	2.0 km	MPC · JPL
407139	2009 TD_{2}	—	October 11, 2009	Charleston	Astronomical Research Observatory	·	2.2 km	MPC · JPL
407140	2009 TN_{4}	—	October 2, 2009	Mount Lemmon	Mount Lemmon Survey	EOS	2.3 km	MPC · JPL
407141	2009 TG_{6}	—	October 12, 2009	Mount Lemmon	Mount Lemmon Survey	·	1.7 km	MPC · JPL
407142	2009 TO_{10}	—	October 7, 2004	Anderson Mesa	LONEOS	·	2.5 km	MPC · JPL
407143	2009 TJ_{11}	—	October 13, 2009	Bergisch Gladbach	W. Bickel	·	3.9 km	MPC · JPL
407144	2009 TB_{15}	—	September 27, 2009	Mount Lemmon	Mount Lemmon Survey	GEF	1.6 km	MPC · JPL
407145	2009 TP_{28}	—	September 16, 2009	Kitt Peak	Spacewatch	VER	2.3 km	MPC · JPL
407146	2009 TK_{32}	—	September 22, 2009	Mount Lemmon	Mount Lemmon Survey	·	3.3 km	MPC · JPL
407147	2009 TL_{34}	—	October 11, 2009	La Sagra	OAM	·	2.0 km	MPC · JPL
407148	2009 TK_{35}	—	September 16, 2009	Mount Lemmon	Mount Lemmon Survey	·	2.4 km	MPC · JPL
407149	2009 TE_{36}	—	October 14, 2009	Catalina	CSS	·	3.9 km	MPC · JPL
407150	2009 TW_{38}	—	October 2, 2009	Mount Lemmon	Mount Lemmon Survey	·	2.2 km	MPC · JPL
407151	2009 TD_{39}	—	October 15, 2009	Catalina	CSS	·	3.3 km	MPC · JPL
407152	2009 TF_{41}	—	September 29, 2009	Mount Lemmon	Mount Lemmon Survey	·	4.1 km	MPC · JPL
407153	2009 TW_{44}	—	October 15, 2009	Catalina	CSS	·	3.2 km	MPC · JPL
407154	2009 UH_{2}	—	October 18, 2009	Tzec Maun	D. Chestnov, A. Novichonok	·	2.4 km	MPC · JPL
407155	2009 UY_{4}	—	September 28, 2009	Mount Lemmon	Mount Lemmon Survey	·	2.5 km	MPC · JPL
407156	2009 UP_{6}	—	October 16, 2009	Mount Lemmon	Mount Lemmon Survey	THM	2.0 km	MPC · JPL
407157	2009 UG_{7}	—	October 16, 2009	Mount Lemmon	Mount Lemmon Survey	THM	1.8 km	MPC · JPL
407158	2009 UY_{7}	—	October 16, 2009	Mount Lemmon	Mount Lemmon Survey	·	1.9 km	MPC · JPL
407159	2009 UQ_{18}	—	October 19, 2009	Taunus	Karge, S., R. Kling	·	1.8 km	MPC · JPL
407160	2009 UX_{21}	—	April 14, 2007	Mount Lemmon	Mount Lemmon Survey	·	4.3 km	MPC · JPL
407161	2009 UM_{25}	—	October 18, 2009	Mount Lemmon	Mount Lemmon Survey	·	2.5 km	MPC · JPL
407162	2009 UM_{26}	—	October 21, 2009	Catalina	CSS	·	4.4 km	MPC · JPL
407163	2009 UT_{26}	—	October 21, 2009	Catalina	CSS	TIR	2.9 km	MPC · JPL
407164	2009 UK_{29}	—	October 18, 2009	Mount Lemmon	Mount Lemmon Survey	·	2.5 km	MPC · JPL
407165	2009 UN_{30}	—	October 18, 2009	Mount Lemmon	Mount Lemmon Survey	THB	2.9 km	MPC · JPL
407166	2009 UR_{34}	—	September 27, 2009	Mount Lemmon	Mount Lemmon Survey	·	3.5 km	MPC · JPL
407167	2009 UA_{37}	—	October 11, 2009	Mount Lemmon	Mount Lemmon Survey	·	3.4 km	MPC · JPL
407168	2009 UH_{37}	—	October 22, 2009	Mount Lemmon	Mount Lemmon Survey	·	3.9 km	MPC · JPL
407169	2009 UU_{42}	—	October 20, 1998	Kitt Peak	Spacewatch	·	2.7 km	MPC · JPL
407170	2009 UU_{46}	—	October 18, 2009	Mount Lemmon	Mount Lemmon Survey	·	3.3 km	MPC · JPL
407171	2009 UC_{50}	—	October 22, 2009	Mount Lemmon	Mount Lemmon Survey	THM	3.0 km	MPC · JPL
407172	2009 UW_{50}	—	September 21, 2009	Mount Lemmon	Mount Lemmon Survey	·	2.1 km	MPC · JPL
407173	2009 UJ_{59}	—	September 21, 2009	Mount Lemmon	Mount Lemmon Survey	VER	4.2 km	MPC · JPL
407174	2009 UP_{59}	—	September 27, 2009	Mount Lemmon	Mount Lemmon Survey	·	3.9 km	MPC · JPL
407175	2009 UY_{61}	—	October 17, 2009	Mount Lemmon	Mount Lemmon Survey	EOS	1.8 km	MPC · JPL
407176	2009 UD_{62}	—	October 17, 2009	Mount Lemmon	Mount Lemmon Survey	·	2.9 km	MPC · JPL
407177	2009 UW_{62}	—	September 21, 2009	Kitt Peak	Spacewatch	·	2.7 km	MPC · JPL
407178	2009 UE_{63}	—	September 17, 2009	Kitt Peak	Spacewatch	·	2.3 km	MPC · JPL
407179	2009 UQ_{67}	—	September 29, 2009	Kitt Peak	Spacewatch	·	3.3 km	MPC · JPL
407180	2009 UN_{70}	—	January 23, 2006	Mount Lemmon	Mount Lemmon Survey	·	1.9 km	MPC · JPL
407181	2009 UR_{81}	—	October 22, 2009	Mount Lemmon	Mount Lemmon Survey	URS	3.1 km	MPC · JPL
407182	2009 UB_{83}	—	October 23, 2009	Mount Lemmon	Mount Lemmon Survey	THM	2.2 km	MPC · JPL
407183	2009 UN_{85}	—	June 6, 2008	Kitt Peak	Spacewatch	·	3.0 km	MPC · JPL
407184	2009 UR_{86}	—	October 24, 2009	Catalina	CSS	·	2.6 km	MPC · JPL
407185	2009 UV_{86}	—	October 24, 2009	Kitt Peak	Spacewatch	·	2.4 km	MPC · JPL
407186	2009 UJ_{94}	—	October 21, 2009	Catalina	CSS	·	2.3 km	MPC · JPL
407187	2009 UM_{94}	—	September 17, 2009	Mount Lemmon	Mount Lemmon Survey	·	3.4 km	MPC · JPL
407188	2009 UR_{97}	—	October 14, 2009	Catalina	CSS	THM	3.1 km	MPC · JPL
407189	2009 US_{98}	—	October 23, 2009	Mount Lemmon	Mount Lemmon Survey	·	2.3 km	MPC · JPL
407190	2009 UV_{115}	—	September 12, 2009	Kitt Peak	Spacewatch	·	3.9 km	MPC · JPL
407191	2009 UY_{116}	—	October 22, 2009	Mount Lemmon	Mount Lemmon Survey	EOS	3.0 km	MPC · JPL
407192	2009 US_{117}	—	October 22, 2009	Mount Lemmon	Mount Lemmon Survey	·	2.7 km	MPC · JPL
407193	2009 UH_{118}	—	October 23, 2009	Mount Lemmon	Mount Lemmon Survey	·	2.8 km	MPC · JPL
407194	2009 UW_{118}	—	September 18, 2009	Kitt Peak	Spacewatch	URS	2.9 km	MPC · JPL
407195	2009 UA_{121}	—	October 24, 2009	Kitt Peak	Spacewatch	·	4.5 km	MPC · JPL
407196	2009 UG_{122}	—	October 26, 2009	Mount Lemmon	Mount Lemmon Survey	·	2.9 km	MPC · JPL
407197	2009 UX_{129}	—	October 27, 2009	La Sagra	OAM	LIX	4.4 km	MPC · JPL
407198	2009 UG_{132}	—	September 28, 2009	Catalina	CSS	EOS	2.8 km	MPC · JPL
407199	2009 UW_{136}	—	October 25, 2009	Catalina	CSS	·	2.9 km	MPC · JPL
407200	2009 UF_{137}	—	October 28, 2009	La Sagra	OAM	·	4.3 km	MPC · JPL

== 407201–407300 ==
back to top

Designation			Discovery			Properties		Ref
Permanent	Provisional	Named after	Date	Site	Discoverer(s)	Category	Diam.	Ref
407201	2009 UU_{142}	—	October 18, 2009	Mount Lemmon	Mount Lemmon Survey	·	2.1 km	MPC · JPL
407202	2009 UR_{143}	—	October 16, 2003	Kitt Peak	Spacewatch	·	2.5 km	MPC · JPL
407203	2009 UU_{149}	—	October 26, 2009	Mount Lemmon	Mount Lemmon Survey	EOS	2.1 km	MPC · JPL
407204	2009 UQ_{150}	—	October 18, 2009	Mount Lemmon	Mount Lemmon Survey	THM	2.0 km	MPC · JPL
407205	2009 UY_{150}	—	October 23, 2009	Kitt Peak	Spacewatch	·	3.1 km	MPC · JPL
407206	2009 UD_{153}	—	October 24, 2009	Mount Lemmon	Mount Lemmon Survey	HYG	3.0 km	MPC · JPL
407207	2009 UK_{154}	—	October 22, 2009	Bisei SG Center	BATTeRS	·	3.9 km	MPC · JPL
407208	2009 VR_{1}	—	November 9, 2009	Calvin-Rehoboth	L. A. Molnar	THM	2.3 km	MPC · JPL
407209	2009 VA_{2}	—	November 9, 2009	Socorro	LINEAR	·	1.8 km	MPC · JPL
407210	2009 VS_{2}	—	November 9, 2009	Socorro	LINEAR	·	3.9 km	MPC · JPL
407211	2009 VF_{8}	—	November 8, 2009	Catalina	CSS	EUP	4.8 km	MPC · JPL
407212	2009 VD_{16}	—	November 8, 2009	Mount Lemmon	Mount Lemmon Survey	·	1.8 km	MPC · JPL
407213	2009 VY_{18}	—	November 9, 2009	Kitt Peak	Spacewatch	·	3.1 km	MPC · JPL
407214	2009 VV_{39}	—	November 11, 2009	Kitt Peak	Spacewatch	·	3.2 km	MPC · JPL
407215	2009 VV_{42}	—	October 21, 2009	Catalina	CSS	·	3.4 km	MPC · JPL
407216	2009 VP_{63}	—	November 8, 2009	Kitt Peak	Spacewatch	·	2.8 km	MPC · JPL
407217	2009 VO_{73}	—	March 25, 2006	Kitt Peak	Spacewatch	·	2.6 km	MPC · JPL
407218	2009 VA_{74}	—	November 11, 2009	Mount Lemmon	Mount Lemmon Survey	·	2.5 km	MPC · JPL
407219	2009 VW_{74}	—	November 11, 2009	Mount Lemmon	Mount Lemmon Survey	·	5.2 km	MPC · JPL
407220	2009 VM_{78}	—	November 9, 2009	Catalina	CSS	·	3.7 km	MPC · JPL
407221	2009 VQ_{85}	—	November 10, 2009	Kitt Peak	Spacewatch	·	3.4 km	MPC · JPL
407222	2009 VU_{87}	—	January 15, 2005	Kitt Peak	Spacewatch	HYG	2.6 km	MPC · JPL
407223	2009 VY_{92}	—	November 15, 2009	Catalina	CSS	EOS	2.0 km	MPC · JPL
407224	2009 VB_{93}	—	November 8, 2009	Catalina	CSS	·	3.2 km	MPC · JPL
407225	2009 VZ_{95}	—	October 22, 2009	Mount Lemmon	Mount Lemmon Survey	ELF	3.7 km	MPC · JPL
407226	2009 VQ_{106}	—	November 9, 2009	Catalina	CSS	·	2.6 km	MPC · JPL
407227	2009 WH_{9}	—	January 18, 2005	Kitt Peak	Spacewatch	·	2.0 km	MPC · JPL
407228	2009 WY_{10}	—	November 20, 2009	Tzec Maun	D. Chestnov, A. Novichonok	HYG	3.9 km	MPC · JPL
407229	2009 WS_{19}	—	November 17, 2009	Mount Lemmon	Mount Lemmon Survey	·	3.8 km	MPC · JPL
407230	2009 WZ_{24}	—	November 21, 2009	Mayhill	Lowe, A.	·	4.1 km	MPC · JPL
407231	2009 WA_{25}	—	November 21, 2009	Tzec Maun	D. Chestnov, A. Novichonok	·	2.2 km	MPC · JPL
407232	2009 WL_{35}	—	November 17, 2009	Kitt Peak	Spacewatch	·	3.1 km	MPC · JPL
407233	2009 WU_{43}	—	November 17, 2009	Mount Lemmon	Mount Lemmon Survey	SYL · CYB	5.2 km	MPC · JPL
407234	2009 WM_{51}	—	November 9, 2009	Kitt Peak	Spacewatch	·	5.3 km	MPC · JPL
407235	2009 WO_{53}	—	November 16, 2009	Socorro	LINEAR	·	2.4 km	MPC · JPL
407236	2009 WR_{69}	—	November 18, 2009	Kitt Peak	Spacewatch	EOS	2.3 km	MPC · JPL
407237	2009 WW_{81}	—	November 18, 2009	La Sagra	OAM	·	2.4 km	MPC · JPL
407238	2009 WY_{84}	—	September 28, 2003	Kitt Peak	Spacewatch	·	3.3 km	MPC · JPL
407239	2009 WZ_{95}	—	November 20, 2009	Mount Lemmon	Mount Lemmon Survey	THM	2.9 km	MPC · JPL
407240	2009 WP_{98}	—	November 21, 2009	Kitt Peak	Spacewatch	·	3.3 km	MPC · JPL
407241	2009 WO_{99}	—	October 18, 2009	Mount Lemmon	Mount Lemmon Survey	VER	2.7 km	MPC · JPL
407242	2009 WD_{100}	—	November 21, 2009	Kitt Peak	Spacewatch	·	4.5 km	MPC · JPL
407243 Krapivin	2009 WQ_{100}	Krapivin	November 21, 2009	Zelenchukskaya Stn102259	T. V. Krjačko	THM	2.0 km	MPC · JPL
407244	2009 WN_{104}	—	November 20, 2009	La Sagra	OAM	·	3.2 km	MPC · JPL
407245	2009 WL_{157}	—	November 20, 2009	Mount Lemmon	Mount Lemmon Survey	·	3.9 km	MPC · JPL
407246	2009 WK_{164}	—	November 21, 2009	Kitt Peak	Spacewatch	·	2.0 km	MPC · JPL
407247	2009 WE_{168}	—	November 9, 2009	Mount Lemmon	Mount Lemmon Survey	·	2.0 km	MPC · JPL
407248	2009 WB_{185}	—	November 24, 2009	La Sagra	OAM	·	3.3 km	MPC · JPL
407249	2009 WG_{187}	—	September 16, 2003	Kitt Peak	Spacewatch	THM	2.0 km	MPC · JPL
407250	2009 WK_{200}	—	January 19, 2005	Kitt Peak	Spacewatch	·	2.9 km	MPC · JPL
407251	2009 WD_{217}	—	October 23, 2009	Kitt Peak	Spacewatch	CYB	3.5 km	MPC · JPL
407252	2009 WA_{221}	—	November 16, 2009	Mount Lemmon	Mount Lemmon Survey	·	3.5 km	MPC · JPL
407253	2009 WK_{234}	—	September 14, 2009	Kitt Peak	Spacewatch	EOS	2.0 km	MPC · JPL
407254	2009 WC_{261}	—	November 16, 2009	Socorro	LINEAR	·	4.0 km	MPC · JPL
407255	2010 AB_{57}	—	November 1, 2006	Catalina	CSS	H	530 m	MPC · JPL
407256	2010 AG_{72}	—	January 13, 2010	Mount Lemmon	Mount Lemmon Survey	T_{j} (2.96) · EUP	5.7 km	MPC · JPL
407257	2010 AX_{104}	—	September 29, 2009	Mount Lemmon	Mount Lemmon Survey	·	3.8 km	MPC · JPL
407258	2010 AU_{117}	—	October 2, 2009	Mount Lemmon	Mount Lemmon Survey	EUP	2.8 km	MPC · JPL
407259	2010 AS_{137}	—	October 1, 2009	Mount Lemmon	Mount Lemmon Survey	·	3.5 km	MPC · JPL
407260	2010 BP_{1}	—	January 18, 2010	Dauban	Kugel, F.	SYL · CYB	5.2 km	MPC · JPL
407261	2010 BQ_{3}	—	January 21, 2010	Haleakala	M. Micheli	·	680 m	MPC · JPL
407262	2010 BX_{37}	—	January 14, 2010	Mount Lemmon	Mount Lemmon Survey	TIR ·	5.2 km	MPC · JPL
407263	2010 BM_{55}	—	August 26, 2009	Catalina	CSS	·	4.4 km	MPC · JPL
407264	2010 BM_{61}	—	May 9, 2007	Mount Lemmon	Mount Lemmon Survey	·	2.2 km	MPC · JPL
407265	2010 CN_{35}	—	March 14, 2007	Mount Lemmon	Mount Lemmon Survey	·	580 m	MPC · JPL
407266	2010 CB_{43}	—	February 9, 2010	Kitt Peak	Spacewatch	PHO	830 m	MPC · JPL
407267	2010 CW_{54}	—	February 14, 2010	WISE	WISE	·	3.7 km	MPC · JPL
407268	2010 CX_{65}	—	February 9, 2010	Catalina	CSS	·	3.1 km	MPC · JPL
407269	2010 CO_{145}	—	December 18, 2003	Socorro	LINEAR	·	4.0 km	MPC · JPL
407270	2010 CK_{147}	—	February 13, 2010	Catalina	CSS	·	3.4 km	MPC · JPL
407271	2010 CZ_{237}	—	September 29, 2009	Mount Lemmon	Mount Lemmon Survey	·	4.9 km	MPC · JPL
407272	2010 DQ_{25}	—	February 20, 2010	WISE	WISE	·	1.4 km	MPC · JPL
407273	2010 DU_{73}	—	February 28, 2010	WISE	WISE	·	3.1 km	MPC · JPL
407274	2010 EC_{80}	—	March 12, 2010	Mount Lemmon	Mount Lemmon Survey	·	600 m	MPC · JPL
407275	2010 FS_{5}	—	March 17, 2010	Kitt Peak	Spacewatch	·	770 m	MPC · JPL
407276	2010 FH_{14}	—	March 17, 2010	Kitt Peak	Spacewatch	·	1.4 km	MPC · JPL
407277	2010 FB_{86}	—	March 25, 2010	Mount Lemmon	Mount Lemmon Survey	NYS	1.0 km	MPC · JPL
407278	2010 FM_{93}	—	May 26, 2007	Mount Lemmon	Mount Lemmon Survey	·	640 m	MPC · JPL
407279	2010 GR_{100}	—	March 21, 2010	Kitt Peak	Spacewatch	·	1.2 km	MPC · JPL
407280	2010 GC_{113}	—	March 19, 2010	Kitt Peak	Spacewatch	·	700 m	MPC · JPL
407281	2010 GA_{117}	—	February 18, 2010	Mount Lemmon	Mount Lemmon Survey	NYS	850 m	MPC · JPL
407282	2010 GB_{117}	—	March 16, 2010	Kitt Peak	Spacewatch	·	680 m	MPC · JPL
407283	2010 GX_{120}	—	October 7, 2004	Kitt Peak	Spacewatch	·	670 m	MPC · JPL
407284	2010 GG_{124}	—	April 4, 2010	Kitt Peak	Spacewatch	·	780 m	MPC · JPL
407285	2010 GO_{125}	—	March 13, 2010	Mount Lemmon	Mount Lemmon Survey	·	690 m	MPC · JPL
407286	2010 GW_{140}	—	October 20, 2007	Kitt Peak	Spacewatch	·	1.0 km	MPC · JPL
407287	2010 GB_{157}	—	April 9, 2010	Kitt Peak	Spacewatch	·	900 m	MPC · JPL
407288	2010 GS_{158}	—	April 15, 2010	Kitt Peak	Spacewatch	·	1.8 km	MPC · JPL
407289	2010 HV_{63}	—	April 26, 2010	WISE	WISE	·	2.4 km	MPC · JPL
407290	2010 HH_{71}	—	April 27, 2010	WISE	WISE	(2076)	1.3 km	MPC · JPL
407291	2010 HE_{104}	—	April 9, 2010	Kitt Peak	Spacewatch	·	900 m	MPC · JPL
407292	2010 JY_{28}	—	May 2, 2010	Kitt Peak	Spacewatch	·	1.2 km	MPC · JPL
407293	2010 JH_{38}	—	September 11, 2007	Kitt Peak	Spacewatch	·	780 m	MPC · JPL
407294	2010 JT_{45}	—	December 14, 2001	Kitt Peak	Spacewatch	·	870 m	MPC · JPL
407295	2010 JY_{108}	—	May 12, 2010	WISE	WISE	·	3.1 km	MPC · JPL
407296	2010 JT_{111}	—	March 13, 2010	Mount Lemmon	Mount Lemmon Survey	NYS	820 m	MPC · JPL
407297	2010 JT_{150}	—	May 11, 2010	Kitt Peak	Spacewatch	·	1.1 km	MPC · JPL
407298	2010 JF_{152}	—	May 6, 2010	Mount Lemmon	Mount Lemmon Survey	·	1.6 km	MPC · JPL
407299	2010 KB_{88}	—	July 29, 2006	Siding Spring	SSS	·	2.3 km	MPC · JPL
407300	2010 LL_{53}	—	June 8, 2010	WISE	WISE	BRG	1.4 km	MPC · JPL

== 407301–407400 ==
back to top

Designation			Discovery			Properties		Ref
Permanent	Provisional	Named after	Date	Site	Discoverer(s)	Category	Diam.	Ref
407301	2010 LE_{62}	—	April 25, 2006	Mount Lemmon	Mount Lemmon Survey	·	1.2 km	MPC · JPL
407302	2010 LE_{67}	—	January 23, 2006	Kitt Peak	Spacewatch	V	540 m	MPC · JPL
407303	2010 LA_{90}	—	June 12, 2010	WISE	WISE	·	1.4 km	MPC · JPL
407304	2010 LM_{127}	—	June 15, 2010	WISE	WISE	ADE	2.1 km	MPC · JPL
407305	2010 LO_{127}	—	June 15, 2010	WISE	WISE	·	1.7 km	MPC · JPL
407306	2010 MJ_{7}	—	June 16, 2010	WISE	WISE	·	2.3 km	MPC · JPL
407307	2010 MT_{72}	—	October 28, 2006	Mount Lemmon	Mount Lemmon Survey	·	1.8 km	MPC · JPL
407308	2010 MA_{107}	—	June 30, 2010	WISE	WISE	·	1.5 km	MPC · JPL
407309	2010 NS_{14}	—	January 10, 2003	Socorro	LINEAR	·	2.4 km	MPC · JPL
407310	2010 NW_{23}	—	July 6, 2010	WISE	WISE	ADE	2.6 km	MPC · JPL
407311	2010 NC_{28}	—	January 15, 2008	Mount Lemmon	Mount Lemmon Survey	·	2.8 km	MPC · JPL
407312	2010 NR_{53}	—	July 10, 2010	WISE	WISE	·	2.9 km	MPC · JPL
407313	2010 NG_{58}	—	July 10, 2010	WISE	WISE	·	1.4 km	MPC · JPL
407314	2010 NB_{87}	—	October 2, 2006	Mount Lemmon	Mount Lemmon Survey	·	1.8 km	MPC · JPL
407315	2010 NC_{115}	—	July 14, 2010	WISE	WISE	·	1.9 km	MPC · JPL
407316	2010 OJ_{3}	—	July 16, 2010	WISE	WISE	·	1.7 km	MPC · JPL
407317	2010 OJ_{24}	—	July 18, 2010	WISE	WISE	PAD	2.8 km	MPC · JPL
407318	2010 ON_{66}	—	December 15, 2006	Mount Lemmon	Mount Lemmon Survey	·	3.0 km	MPC · JPL
407319	2010 OR_{76}	—	July 25, 2010	WISE	WISE	DOR	2.0 km	MPC · JPL
407320	2010 OL_{90}	—	August 29, 2005	Kitt Peak	Spacewatch	·	2.0 km	MPC · JPL
407321	2010 OK_{91}	—	January 5, 2003	Socorro	LINEAR	·	2.9 km	MPC · JPL
407322	2010 OM_{91}	—	August 28, 2005	Kitt Peak	Spacewatch	·	2.1 km	MPC · JPL
407323	2010 OM_{98}	—	July 28, 2010	WISE	WISE	·	2.1 km	MPC · JPL
407324	2010 OB_{101}	—	July 18, 2010	WISE	WISE	APO · critical	280 m	MPC · JPL
407325	2010 OS_{121}	—	July 31, 2010	WISE	WISE	·	2.7 km	MPC · JPL
407326	2010 PQ_{54}	—	August 8, 2010	WISE	WISE	DOR	1.9 km	MPC · JPL
407327	2010 PT_{55}	—	August 8, 2010	WISE	WISE	·	2.3 km	MPC · JPL
407328	2010 PL_{57}	—	August 6, 2010	La Sagra	OAM	·	1.2 km	MPC · JPL
407329	2010 PZ_{60}	—	August 10, 2010	Kitt Peak	Spacewatch	MAS	760 m	MPC · JPL
407330	2010 PS_{63}	—	August 3, 2010	Purple Mountain	PMO NEO Survey Program	·	1.2 km	MPC · JPL
407331	2010 PR_{76}	—	August 10, 2010	Kitt Peak	Spacewatch	PHO	1.2 km	MPC · JPL
407332	2010 PP_{79}	—	August 12, 2010	Kitt Peak	Spacewatch	·	1.3 km	MPC · JPL
407333	2010 PW_{79}	—	August 10, 2010	Kitt Peak	Spacewatch	·	1.4 km	MPC · JPL
407334	2010 QF	—	August 16, 2010	La Sagra	OAM	·	960 m	MPC · JPL
407335	2010 QZ	—	September 16, 2006	Catalina	CSS	·	1.5 km	MPC · JPL
407336	2010 RC_{15}	—	September 2, 2010	Mount Lemmon	Mount Lemmon Survey	·	1.8 km	MPC · JPL
407337	2010 RN_{26}	—	January 1, 2008	Kitt Peak	Spacewatch	·	1.1 km	MPC · JPL
407338	2010 RQ_{30}	—	September 3, 2010	Mount Lemmon	Mount Lemmon Survey	APO +1km	830 m	MPC · JPL
407339	2010 RV_{39}	—	September 25, 2006	Catalina	CSS	·	2.1 km	MPC · JPL
407340	2010 RP_{47}	—	September 4, 2010	Kitt Peak	Spacewatch	·	1.5 km	MPC · JPL
407341	2010 RW_{47}	—	September 4, 2010	Kitt Peak	Spacewatch	·	1.5 km	MPC · JPL
407342	2010 RN_{48}	—	September 4, 2010	Kitt Peak	Spacewatch	·	1.2 km	MPC · JPL
407343	2010 RB_{51}	—	September 4, 2010	Kitt Peak	Spacewatch	·	1.3 km	MPC · JPL
407344	2010 RX_{58}	—	September 17, 2006	Catalina	CSS	·	960 m	MPC · JPL
407345	2010 RS_{62}	—	October 3, 2006	Catalina	CSS	MAR	1.5 km	MPC · JPL
407346	2010 RC_{64}	—	November 17, 2006	Kitt Peak	Spacewatch	·	1.8 km	MPC · JPL
407347	2010 RG_{78}	—	September 11, 2010	Kitt Peak	Spacewatch	(5)	1.2 km	MPC · JPL
407348	2010 RZ_{81}	—	April 3, 2008	Mount Lemmon	Mount Lemmon Survey	·	1.4 km	MPC · JPL
407349	2010 RJ_{90}	—	September 11, 2010	Wildberg	R. Apitzsch	·	1.1 km	MPC · JPL
407350	2010 RE_{99}	—	August 6, 2010	Kitt Peak	Spacewatch	·	1.6 km	MPC · JPL
407351	2010 RR_{99}	—	September 10, 2010	Kitt Peak	Spacewatch	AGN	1.2 km	MPC · JPL
407352	2010 RB_{100}	—	October 13, 2006	Kitt Peak	Spacewatch	(5)	930 m	MPC · JPL
407353	2010 RL_{100}	—	February 26, 2008	Mount Lemmon	Mount Lemmon Survey	·	1.5 km	MPC · JPL
407354	2010 RK_{101}	—	September 10, 2010	Kitt Peak	Spacewatch	·	1.3 km	MPC · JPL
407355	2010 RJ_{102}	—	September 10, 2010	Kitt Peak	Spacewatch	NEM	1.7 km	MPC · JPL
407356	2010 RP_{103}	—	September 10, 2010	Kitt Peak	Spacewatch	·	2.2 km	MPC · JPL
407357	2010 RL_{104}	—	February 3, 2003	Kitt Peak	Spacewatch	·	1.4 km	MPC · JPL
407358	2010 RS_{104}	—	September 10, 2010	Kitt Peak	Spacewatch	·	1.5 km	MPC · JPL
407359	2010 RW_{104}	—	September 10, 2010	Kitt Peak	Spacewatch	·	1.7 km	MPC · JPL
407360	2010 RS_{105}	—	May 27, 2009	Mount Lemmon	Mount Lemmon Survey	·	1.3 km	MPC · JPL
407361	2010 RN_{106}	—	September 10, 2010	Kitt Peak	Spacewatch	·	1.5 km	MPC · JPL
407362	2010 RJ_{107}	—	September 10, 2010	Kitt Peak	Spacewatch	AGN	1.0 km	MPC · JPL
407363	2010 RQ_{110}	—	September 28, 2006	Kitt Peak	Spacewatch	·	1.3 km	MPC · JPL
407364	2010 RW_{111}	—	September 28, 2006	Mount Lemmon	Mount Lemmon Survey	·	1.2 km	MPC · JPL
407365	2010 RV_{117}	—	February 9, 2007	Kitt Peak	Spacewatch	·	1.8 km	MPC · JPL
407366	2010 RO_{118}	—	September 11, 2010	Kitt Peak	Spacewatch	·	1.1 km	MPC · JPL
407367	2010 RH_{126}	—	February 7, 2008	Mount Lemmon	Mount Lemmon Survey	·	1.2 km	MPC · JPL
407368	2010 RS_{129}	—	March 10, 2005	Mount Lemmon	Mount Lemmon Survey	NYS	1.4 km	MPC · JPL
407369	2010 RU_{129}	—	October 6, 2002	Socorro	LINEAR	·	2.0 km	MPC · JPL
407370	2010 RM_{135}	—	September 10, 2010	Kitt Peak	Spacewatch	·	1.6 km	MPC · JPL
407371	2010 RK_{136}	—	March 13, 2008	Kitt Peak	Spacewatch	ADE	1.8 km	MPC · JPL
407372	2010 RS_{139}	—	September 27, 2006	Mount Lemmon	Mount Lemmon Survey	·	1.0 km	MPC · JPL
407373	2010 RR_{146}	—	September 4, 2010	Kitt Peak	Spacewatch	·	1.1 km	MPC · JPL
407374	2010 RN_{147}	—	September 14, 2010	Kitt Peak	Spacewatch	·	1.0 km	MPC · JPL
407375	2010 RL_{149}	—	June 15, 2010	WISE	WISE	·	1.4 km	MPC · JPL
407376	2010 RQ_{149}	—	September 15, 2010	Kitt Peak	Spacewatch	·	1.4 km	MPC · JPL
407377	2010 RR_{150}	—	September 16, 2006	Kitt Peak	Spacewatch	·	970 m	MPC · JPL
407378	2010 RZ_{151}	—	October 2, 2006	Mount Lemmon	Mount Lemmon Survey	·	1.5 km	MPC · JPL
407379	2010 RF_{165}	—	March 1, 2009	Mount Lemmon	Mount Lemmon Survey	·	1.5 km	MPC · JPL
407380	2010 RM_{173}	—	September 5, 2010	Mount Lemmon	Mount Lemmon Survey	·	1.8 km	MPC · JPL
407381	2010 RY_{174}	—	September 9, 2010	Kitt Peak	Spacewatch	·	1.4 km	MPC · JPL
407382	2010 RZ_{177}	—	September 11, 2010	Kitt Peak	Spacewatch	·	2.0 km	MPC · JPL
407383	2010 RM_{179}	—	September 17, 2006	Kitt Peak	Spacewatch	MAR	880 m	MPC · JPL
407384	2010 RD_{180}	—	September 4, 2010	Kitt Peak	Spacewatch	·	1.4 km	MPC · JPL
407385	2010 RX_{180}	—	June 15, 2010	Mount Lemmon	Mount Lemmon Survey	·	1.9 km	MPC · JPL
407386	2010 RY_{180}	—	September 11, 2010	Mount Lemmon	Mount Lemmon Survey	·	2.1 km	MPC · JPL
407387	2010 SR_{13}	—	September 17, 2006	Kitt Peak	Spacewatch	·	1.1 km	MPC · JPL
407388	2010 SY_{13}	—	September 27, 2010	Kitt Peak	Spacewatch	HNS	1.4 km	MPC · JPL
407389	2010 SK_{27}	—	October 19, 2006	Mount Lemmon	Mount Lemmon Survey	(5)	1.3 km	MPC · JPL
407390	2010 SC_{29}	—	February 28, 2008	Mount Lemmon	Mount Lemmon Survey	·	1.6 km	MPC · JPL
407391	2010 SS_{32}	—	May 11, 2005	Mount Lemmon	Mount Lemmon Survey	(5)	1.1 km	MPC · JPL
407392	2010 SD_{33}	—	October 3, 2006	Mount Lemmon	Mount Lemmon Survey	·	1.1 km	MPC · JPL
407393	2010 SC_{34}	—	February 8, 2008	Mount Lemmon	Mount Lemmon Survey	·	1.8 km	MPC · JPL
407394	2010 SO_{35}	—	September 14, 2010	Kitt Peak	Spacewatch	·	1.3 km	MPC · JPL
407395	2010 TG_{14}	—	September 30, 2006	Mount Lemmon	Mount Lemmon Survey	·	1.6 km	MPC · JPL
407396	2010 TN_{15}	—	November 14, 2006	Kitt Peak	Spacewatch	WIT	910 m	MPC · JPL
407397	2010 TH_{18}	—	October 3, 2006	Mount Lemmon	Mount Lemmon Survey	·	1.4 km	MPC · JPL
407398	2010 TL_{18}	—	October 2, 2006	Mount Lemmon	Mount Lemmon Survey	·	1.1 km	MPC · JPL
407399	2010 TC_{20}	—	August 29, 2006	Kitt Peak	Spacewatch	·	1.0 km	MPC · JPL
407400	2010 TK_{27}	—	November 11, 2006	Mount Lemmon	Mount Lemmon Survey	·	1.8 km	MPC · JPL

== 407401–407500 ==
back to top

Designation			Discovery			Properties		Ref
Permanent	Provisional	Named after	Date	Site	Discoverer(s)	Category	Diam.	Ref
407401	2010 TT_{28}	—	September 30, 2006	Mount Lemmon	Mount Lemmon Survey	·	1.4 km	MPC · JPL
407402	2010 TZ_{30}	—	September 14, 2010	Kitt Peak	Spacewatch	·	1.4 km	MPC · JPL
407403	2010 TA_{32}	—	October 2, 2010	Kitt Peak	Spacewatch	·	1.3 km	MPC · JPL
407404	2010 TQ_{32}	—	November 15, 2006	Kitt Peak	Spacewatch	·	1.2 km	MPC · JPL
407405	2010 TV_{40}	—	April 6, 2008	Mount Lemmon	Mount Lemmon Survey	HNS	1.0 km	MPC · JPL
407406	2010 TV_{44}	—	October 3, 2010	Kitt Peak	Spacewatch	AGN	1 km	MPC · JPL
407407	2010 TZ_{65}	—	March 2, 2008	Kitt Peak	Spacewatch	·	1.3 km	MPC · JPL
407408	2010 TY_{77}	—	September 17, 2010	Kitt Peak	Spacewatch	·	1.4 km	MPC · JPL
407409	2010 TQ_{80}	—	May 15, 2009	Kitt Peak	Spacewatch	·	1.4 km	MPC · JPL
407410	2010 TZ_{81}	—	November 18, 2006	Mount Lemmon	Mount Lemmon Survey	(5)	1.3 km	MPC · JPL
407411	2010 TR_{82}	—	October 23, 2006	Kitt Peak	Spacewatch	·	1.4 km	MPC · JPL
407412	2010 TR_{89}	—	March 13, 2008	Kitt Peak	Spacewatch	AGN	1.1 km	MPC · JPL
407413	2010 TM_{91}	—	September 17, 2010	Kitt Peak	Spacewatch	AGN	1.0 km	MPC · JPL
407414	2010 TF_{93}	—	October 19, 2006	Kitt Peak	Spacewatch	·	1.8 km	MPC · JPL
407415	2010 TK_{94}	—	September 18, 2006	Kitt Peak	Spacewatch	·	960 m	MPC · JPL
407416	2010 TO_{94}	—	March 28, 2008	Mount Lemmon	Mount Lemmon Survey	·	1.7 km	MPC · JPL
407417	2010 TZ_{94}	—	October 27, 2006	Mount Lemmon	Mount Lemmon Survey	·	1.5 km	MPC · JPL
407418	2010 TM_{97}	—	October 20, 2006	Mount Lemmon	Mount Lemmon Survey	·	1.5 km	MPC · JPL
407419	2010 TA_{99}	—	October 2, 2006	Mount Lemmon	Mount Lemmon Survey	·	970 m	MPC · JPL
407420	2010 TT_{99}	—	October 1, 2010	Mount Lemmon	Mount Lemmon Survey	·	1.6 km	MPC · JPL
407421	2010 TA_{100}	—	September 4, 2010	Kitt Peak	Spacewatch	·	1.1 km	MPC · JPL
407422	2010 TB_{100}	—	September 16, 2010	Kitt Peak	Spacewatch	AGN	1.2 km	MPC · JPL
407423	2010 TJ_{100}	—	September 16, 2010	Kitt Peak	Spacewatch	·	1.6 km	MPC · JPL
407424	2010 TF_{103}	—	October 17, 2006	Mount Lemmon	Mount Lemmon Survey	·	1.3 km	MPC · JPL
407425	2010 TX_{108}	—	March 17, 2004	Kitt Peak	Spacewatch	MAR	1.1 km	MPC · JPL
407426	2010 TM_{115}	—	April 13, 2004	Kitt Peak	Spacewatch	NEM	2.2 km	MPC · JPL
407427	2010 TV_{126}	—	November 14, 2006	Kitt Peak	Spacewatch	·	1.4 km	MPC · JPL
407428	2010 TY_{126}	—	March 11, 2008	Kitt Peak	Spacewatch	·	1.7 km	MPC · JPL
407429	2010 TS_{136}	—	September 30, 2006	Mount Lemmon	Mount Lemmon Survey	·	2.4 km	MPC · JPL
407430	2010 TR_{140}	—	March 10, 2008	Kitt Peak	Spacewatch	WIT	840 m	MPC · JPL
407431	2010 TP_{141}	—	February 7, 2008	Kitt Peak	Spacewatch	EUN	1.2 km	MPC · JPL
407432	2010 TG_{143}	—	October 11, 2010	Mount Lemmon	Mount Lemmon Survey	·	1.2 km	MPC · JPL
407433	2010 TM_{143}	—	October 11, 2010	Mount Lemmon	Mount Lemmon Survey	·	1.6 km	MPC · JPL
407434	2010 TG_{162}	—	October 30, 2006	Catalina	CSS	·	950 m	MPC · JPL
407435	2010 TO_{168}	—	August 29, 2006	Catalina	CSS	MAR	1.9 km	MPC · JPL
407436	2010 TU_{168}	—	August 9, 2010	Kitt Peak	Spacewatch	EUN	1.2 km	MPC · JPL
407437	2010 TG_{170}	—	October 8, 2010	Catalina	CSS	EUN	1.4 km	MPC · JPL
407438	2010 TO_{171}	—	December 21, 2006	Kitt Peak	Spacewatch	AEO	1.0 km	MPC · JPL
407439	2010 TN_{174}	—	October 23, 2006	Kitt Peak	Spacewatch	EUN	860 m	MPC · JPL
407440	2010 TB_{179}	—	September 10, 2010	Kitt Peak	Spacewatch	·	1.3 km	MPC · JPL
407441	2010 TQ_{181}	—	March 11, 2008	Mount Lemmon	Mount Lemmon Survey	PAD	1.3 km	MPC · JPL
407442	2010 TH_{182}	—	October 13, 2010	Mount Lemmon	Mount Lemmon Survey	VER	2.8 km	MPC · JPL
407443	2010 TT_{186}	—	April 3, 2008	Mount Lemmon	Mount Lemmon Survey	·	1.4 km	MPC · JPL
407444	2010 TS_{187}	—	March 6, 2008	Mount Lemmon	Mount Lemmon Survey	·	1.8 km	MPC · JPL
407445	2010 UR	—	September 18, 2010	Mount Lemmon	Mount Lemmon Survey	·	1.7 km	MPC · JPL
407446	2010 UY	—	October 1, 2005	Mount Lemmon	Mount Lemmon Survey	·	1.6 km	MPC · JPL
407447	2010 UP_{1}	—	December 13, 2006	Kitt Peak	Spacewatch	HOF	2.0 km	MPC · JPL
407448	2010 UE_{10}	—	October 13, 2010	Catalina	CSS	NEM	2.1 km	MPC · JPL
407449	2010 UO_{19}	—	July 10, 2005	Kitt Peak	Spacewatch	·	1.4 km	MPC · JPL
407450	2010 US_{21}	—	March 6, 2008	Mount Lemmon	Mount Lemmon Survey	(5)	1.2 km	MPC · JPL
407451	2010 UQ_{26}	—	October 28, 2010	Mount Lemmon	Mount Lemmon Survey	·	2.3 km	MPC · JPL
407452	2010 UW_{27}	—	October 3, 2005	Catalina	CSS	·	2.7 km	MPC · JPL
407453	2010 UV_{30}	—	September 16, 2010	Kitt Peak	Spacewatch	·	2.0 km	MPC · JPL
407454	2010 US_{35}	—	March 29, 2008	Kitt Peak	Spacewatch	MRX	1.2 km	MPC · JPL
407455	2010 UK_{37}	—	October 29, 2010	Mount Lemmon	Mount Lemmon Survey	EOS	1.8 km	MPC · JPL
407456	2010 UV_{39}	—	November 16, 2006	Kitt Peak	Spacewatch	·	1.1 km	MPC · JPL
407457	2010 UT_{43}	—	October 19, 2010	Mount Lemmon	Mount Lemmon Survey	AGN	1.3 km	MPC · JPL
407458	2010 UQ_{44}	—	October 13, 2010	Mount Lemmon	Mount Lemmon Survey	(5)	1.3 km	MPC · JPL
407459	2010 UO_{49}	—	March 29, 2008	Mount Lemmon	Mount Lemmon Survey	·	1.6 km	MPC · JPL
407460	2010 UR_{50}	—	January 17, 2007	Catalina	CSS	·	2.2 km	MPC · JPL
407461	2010 UT_{56}	—	May 1, 2008	Siding Spring	SSS	·	4.9 km	MPC · JPL
407462	2010 UH_{60}	—	October 29, 2010	Kitt Peak	Spacewatch	EOS	2.4 km	MPC · JPL
407463	2010 UC_{62}	—	February 26, 2003	Campo Imperatore	CINEOS	·	2.5 km	MPC · JPL
407464	2010 UC_{64}	—	September 19, 2001	Socorro	LINEAR	·	1.5 km	MPC · JPL
407465	2010 UF_{64}	—	August 27, 2001	Kitt Peak	Spacewatch	·	1.4 km	MPC · JPL
407466	2010 UB_{72}	—	September 13, 2005	Kitt Peak	Spacewatch	·	1.6 km	MPC · JPL
407467	2010 UN_{72}	—	November 18, 2006	Kitt Peak	Spacewatch	·	1.5 km	MPC · JPL
407468	2010 UK_{76}	—	October 30, 2010	Kitt Peak	Spacewatch	(5)	1.4 km	MPC · JPL
407469	2010 UJ_{79}	—	March 10, 2008	Kitt Peak	Spacewatch	·	2.4 km	MPC · JPL
407470	2010 UG_{80}	—	October 30, 2010	Mount Lemmon	Mount Lemmon Survey	·	1.7 km	MPC · JPL
407471	2010 UX_{81}	—	November 1, 2005	Mount Lemmon	Mount Lemmon Survey	EOS	1.9 km	MPC · JPL
407472	2010 UX_{84}	—	November 25, 2006	Mount Lemmon	Mount Lemmon Survey	·	1.1 km	MPC · JPL
407473	2010 UG_{93}	—	October 8, 2005	Catalina	CSS	·	2.1 km	MPC · JPL
407474	2010 UP_{93}	—	October 13, 2010	Mount Lemmon	Mount Lemmon Survey	·	2.4 km	MPC · JPL
407475	2010 UQ_{95}	—	September 21, 2001	Socorro	LINEAR	·	1.9 km	MPC · JPL
407476	2010 UV_{95}	—	November 20, 2006	Kitt Peak	Spacewatch	·	1.2 km	MPC · JPL
407477	2010 UZ_{95}	—	November 15, 2006	Catalina	CSS	·	1.5 km	MPC · JPL
407478	2010 UG_{100}	—	October 30, 2010	Mount Lemmon	Mount Lemmon Survey	·	1.8 km	MPC · JPL
407479	2010 UO_{100}	—	October 13, 2010	Mount Lemmon	Mount Lemmon Survey	EOS	2.3 km	MPC · JPL
407480	2010 UW_{101}	—	November 17, 2006	Mount Lemmon	Mount Lemmon Survey	·	1.5 km	MPC · JPL
407481	2010 UU_{102}	—	December 7, 2001	Kitt Peak	Spacewatch	·	1.9 km	MPC · JPL
407482	2010 UU_{104}	—	September 19, 1995	Kitt Peak	Spacewatch	KOR	1.1 km	MPC · JPL
407483	2010 UM_{106}	—	October 30, 2010	Mount Lemmon	Mount Lemmon Survey	·	1.8 km	MPC · JPL
407484	2010 VL_{12}	—	September 3, 2010	Mount Lemmon	Mount Lemmon Survey	·	1.3 km	MPC · JPL
407485	2010 VB_{15}	—	January 22, 1998	Kitt Peak	Spacewatch	·	1.8 km	MPC · JPL
407486	2010 VF_{19}	—	November 20, 2006	Kitt Peak	Spacewatch	·	1.4 km	MPC · JPL
407487	2010 VK_{21}	—	October 20, 2001	Socorro	LINEAR	·	1.6 km	MPC · JPL
407488	2010 VG_{34}	—	November 20, 2001	Kitt Peak	Spacewatch	·	2.0 km	MPC · JPL
407489	2010 VN_{48}	—	October 23, 2006	Mount Lemmon	Mount Lemmon Survey	·	1.7 km	MPC · JPL
407490	2010 VN_{52}	—	September 11, 2010	Mount Lemmon	Mount Lemmon Survey	·	1.6 km	MPC · JPL
407491	2010 VB_{55}	—	October 1, 2005	Kitt Peak	Spacewatch	KOR	1.2 km	MPC · JPL
407492	2010 VQ_{58}	—	October 13, 2010	Mount Lemmon	Mount Lemmon Survey	·	1.9 km	MPC · JPL
407493	2010 VZ_{64}	—	November 7, 2010	Kitt Peak	Spacewatch	·	2.3 km	MPC · JPL
407494	2010 VR_{73}	—	November 23, 2006	Kitt Peak	Spacewatch	·	1.4 km	MPC · JPL
407495	2010 VJ_{76}	—	November 20, 2001	Socorro	LINEAR	·	1.9 km	MPC · JPL
407496	2010 VE_{77}	—	November 27, 2006	Mount Lemmon	Mount Lemmon Survey	·	1.9 km	MPC · JPL
407497	2010 VV_{83}	—	September 13, 2005	Kitt Peak	Spacewatch	·	1.5 km	MPC · JPL
407498	2010 VC_{84}	—	October 28, 2010	Kitt Peak	Spacewatch	·	3.4 km	MPC · JPL
407499	2010 VM_{84}	—	September 26, 2005	Kitt Peak	Spacewatch	HOF	2.8 km	MPC · JPL
407500	2010 VZ_{85}	—	September 4, 2010	Kitt Peak	Spacewatch	EMA	3.3 km	MPC · JPL

== 407501–407600 ==
back to top

Designation			Discovery			Properties		Ref
Permanent	Provisional	Named after	Date	Site	Discoverer(s)	Category	Diam.	Ref
407501	2010 VF_{89}	—	November 6, 2010	Kitt Peak	Spacewatch	EOS	2.2 km	MPC · JPL
407502	2010 VD_{90}	—	March 14, 2007	Kitt Peak	Spacewatch	·	2.7 km	MPC · JPL
407503	2010 VP_{91}	—	September 28, 1997	Kitt Peak	Spacewatch	·	1.3 km	MPC · JPL
407504	2010 VL_{95}	—	November 8, 2010	Mount Lemmon	Mount Lemmon Survey	·	1.4 km	MPC · JPL
407505	2010 VZ_{97}	—	November 19, 2001	Socorro	LINEAR	·	1.4 km	MPC · JPL
407506	2010 VH_{98}	—	November 1, 2010	Mount Lemmon	Mount Lemmon Survey	·	1.9 km	MPC · JPL
407507	2010 VQ_{101}	—	November 5, 2010	Kitt Peak	Spacewatch	·	1.6 km	MPC · JPL
407508	2010 VJ_{103}	—	November 5, 2010	Kitt Peak	Spacewatch	·	3.4 km	MPC · JPL
407509	2010 VZ_{104}	—	August 26, 2000	Cerro Tololo	Deep Ecliptic Survey	HOF	2.2 km	MPC · JPL
407510	2010 VD_{105}	—	March 12, 2008	Mount Lemmon	Mount Lemmon Survey	·	2.1 km	MPC · JPL
407511	2010 VL_{114}	—	October 29, 2010	Kitt Peak	Spacewatch	·	3.4 km	MPC · JPL
407512	2010 VS_{114}	—	January 27, 2007	Mount Lemmon	Mount Lemmon Survey	·	1.5 km	MPC · JPL
407513	2010 VS_{115}	—	March 29, 2008	Mount Lemmon	Mount Lemmon Survey	·	1.9 km	MPC · JPL
407514	2010 VL_{128}	—	November 2, 2010	Mount Lemmon	Mount Lemmon Survey	AGN	1.2 km	MPC · JPL
407515	2010 VR_{134}	—	April 11, 2008	Kitt Peak	Spacewatch	NEM	2.1 km	MPC · JPL
407516	2010 VU_{134}	—	October 28, 1997	Kitt Peak	Spacewatch	(17392)	1.4 km	MPC · JPL
407517	2010 VV_{135}	—	October 21, 1995	Kitt Peak	Spacewatch	·	1.8 km	MPC · JPL
407518	2010 VQ_{136}	—	November 10, 2010	Mount Lemmon	Mount Lemmon Survey	EOS	1.8 km	MPC · JPL
407519	2010 VZ_{140}	—	April 13, 2008	Mount Lemmon	Mount Lemmon Survey	·	1.6 km	MPC · JPL
407520	2010 VW_{150}	—	January 10, 2007	Kitt Peak	Spacewatch	·	1.8 km	MPC · JPL
407521	2010 VC_{158}	—	March 28, 2008	Mount Lemmon	Mount Lemmon Survey	·	1.5 km	MPC · JPL
407522	2010 VS_{161}	—	April 14, 2008	Kitt Peak	Spacewatch	·	2.5 km	MPC · JPL
407523	2010 VU_{172}	—	November 10, 2010	Mount Lemmon	Mount Lemmon Survey	EOS	2.0 km	MPC · JPL
407524	2010 VA_{174}	—	October 30, 2010	Kitt Peak	Spacewatch	·	2.8 km	MPC · JPL
407525	2010 VY_{174}	—	March 30, 2008	Kitt Peak	Spacewatch	WIT	920 m	MPC · JPL
407526	2010 VT_{191}	—	February 16, 2007	Catalina	CSS	·	2.4 km	MPC · JPL
407527	2010 VG_{192}	—	September 1, 2005	Kitt Peak	Spacewatch	MRX	880 m	MPC · JPL
407528	2010 VM_{196}	—	March 1, 2008	Kitt Peak	Spacewatch	·	1.8 km	MPC · JPL
407529	2010 VL_{200}	—	January 16, 2007	Catalina	CSS	·	1.9 km	MPC · JPL
407530	2010 VG_{201}	—	January 27, 2007	Mount Lemmon	Mount Lemmon Survey	·	1.8 km	MPC · JPL
407531	2010 VH_{203}	—	October 11, 2010	Mount Lemmon	Mount Lemmon Survey	·	1.6 km	MPC · JPL
407532	2010 VV_{205}	—	April 5, 2008	Mount Lemmon	Mount Lemmon Survey	WIT	1.1 km	MPC · JPL
407533	2010 VP_{207}	—	March 31, 2008	Kitt Peak	Spacewatch	·	2.0 km	MPC · JPL
407534	2010 VQ_{211}	—	September 11, 2010	Mount Lemmon	Mount Lemmon Survey	·	2.2 km	MPC · JPL
407535	2010 VQ_{217}	—	October 25, 2005	Kitt Peak	Spacewatch	EOS	2.0 km	MPC · JPL
407536	2010 WB_{7}	—	November 29, 2005	Kitt Peak	Spacewatch	·	1.8 km	MPC · JPL
407537	2010 WO_{8}	—	November 3, 2010	Mount Lemmon	Mount Lemmon Survey	·	3.4 km	MPC · JPL
407538	2010 WX_{13}	—	November 28, 2006	Mount Lemmon	Mount Lemmon Survey	·	2.0 km	MPC · JPL
407539	2010 WJ_{15}	—	September 13, 2005	Kitt Peak	Spacewatch	·	1.6 km	MPC · JPL
407540	2010 WP_{21}	—	September 29, 2005	Mount Lemmon	Mount Lemmon Survey	·	1.6 km	MPC · JPL
407541	2010 WH_{27}	—	November 25, 2005	Kitt Peak	Spacewatch	·	1.8 km	MPC · JPL
407542	2010 WV_{27}	—	November 14, 2010	Kitt Peak	Spacewatch	AGN	1.1 km	MPC · JPL
407543	2010 WF_{30}	—	October 30, 2005	Kitt Peak	Spacewatch	KOR	1.4 km	MPC · JPL
407544	2010 WT_{32}	—	January 12, 1996	Kitt Peak	Spacewatch	·	2.0 km	MPC · JPL
407545	2010 WL_{48}	—	November 2, 2010	Kitt Peak	Spacewatch	·	2.0 km	MPC · JPL
407546	2010 WA_{50}	—	December 13, 2006	Catalina	CSS	·	1.7 km	MPC · JPL
407547	2010 WD_{52}	—	November 10, 2010	Kitt Peak	Spacewatch	EOS	2.7 km	MPC · JPL
407548	2010 WD_{55}	—	March 27, 2003	Kitt Peak	Spacewatch	·	2.8 km	MPC · JPL
407549	2010 WP_{64}	—	November 19, 2006	Kitt Peak	Spacewatch	·	1.5 km	MPC · JPL
407550	2010 WK_{71}	—	February 26, 2008	Mount Lemmon	Mount Lemmon Survey	(5)	2.0 km	MPC · JPL
407551	2010 WW_{73}	—	November 11, 2004	Anderson Mesa	LONEOS	·	4.8 km	MPC · JPL
407552	2010 XR_{9}	—	December 27, 2006	Mount Lemmon	Mount Lemmon Survey	·	1.6 km	MPC · JPL
407553	2010 XD_{30}	—	November 25, 2006	Kitt Peak	Spacewatch	·	1.6 km	MPC · JPL
407554	2010 XM_{30}	—	November 10, 2005	Mount Lemmon	Mount Lemmon Survey	·	1.8 km	MPC · JPL
407555	2010 XW_{33}	—	October 25, 2005	Kitt Peak	Spacewatch	·	2.0 km	MPC · JPL
407556	2010 XJ_{36}	—	November 14, 2010	Mount Lemmon	Mount Lemmon Survey	GEF	1.2 km	MPC · JPL
407557	2010 XK_{45}	—	November 10, 2010	Mount Lemmon	Mount Lemmon Survey	·	2.7 km	MPC · JPL
407558	2010 XE_{62}	—	December 22, 2005	Catalina	CSS	·	2.2 km	MPC · JPL
407559	2010 XA_{65}	—	November 6, 2010	Kitt Peak	Spacewatch	·	3.8 km	MPC · JPL
407560	2010 XN_{65}	—	February 28, 2008	Kitt Peak	Spacewatch	·	1.7 km	MPC · JPL
407561	2010 XE_{66}	—	January 23, 2006	Kitt Peak	Spacewatch	·	1.7 km	MPC · JPL
407562	2010 XT_{75}	—	July 4, 2005	Mount Lemmon	Mount Lemmon Survey	·	1.3 km	MPC · JPL
407563	2010 XA_{78}	—	December 14, 2006	Kitt Peak	Spacewatch	·	1.2 km	MPC · JPL
407564	2010 XG_{79}	—	December 17, 2001	Kitt Peak	Spacewatch	·	1.4 km	MPC · JPL
407565	2010 XG_{86}	—	December 7, 2005	Kitt Peak	Spacewatch	·	2.9 km	MPC · JPL
407566	2010 XH_{86}	—	November 13, 2010	Kitt Peak	Spacewatch	·	3.7 km	MPC · JPL
407567	2010 XJ_{86}	—	September 28, 2006	Mount Lemmon	Mount Lemmon Survey	·	1.8 km	MPC · JPL
407568	2010 YR_{2}	—	April 26, 2007	Kitt Peak	Spacewatch	VER	2.9 km	MPC · JPL
407569	2010 YA_{3}	—	December 9, 2001	Socorro	LINEAR	·	1.9 km	MPC · JPL
407570	2010 YU_{3}	—	October 27, 2009	Mount Lemmon	Mount Lemmon Survey	·	3.9 km	MPC · JPL
407571	2011 AY_{4}	—	November 7, 2010	Mount Lemmon	Mount Lemmon Survey	GEF	1.6 km	MPC · JPL
407572	2011 AY_{6}	—	September 22, 2009	Catalina	CSS	·	3.1 km	MPC · JPL
407573	2011 AE_{8}	—	December 31, 1994	Kitt Peak	Spacewatch	EOS	2.6 km	MPC · JPL
407574	2011 AX_{8}	—	December 14, 2010	Mount Lemmon	Mount Lemmon Survey	·	2.9 km	MPC · JPL
407575	2011 AS_{9}	—	November 15, 2010	Mount Lemmon	Mount Lemmon Survey	·	3.2 km	MPC · JPL
407576	2011 AH_{11}	—	February 17, 2007	Catalina	CSS	·	1.4 km	MPC · JPL
407577	2011 AT_{20}	—	September 15, 2009	Kitt Peak	Spacewatch	·	2.1 km	MPC · JPL
407578	2011 AA_{31}	—	January 26, 2000	Kitt Peak	Spacewatch	EOS	2.6 km	MPC · JPL
407579	2011 AU_{32}	—	December 30, 2005	Mount Lemmon	Mount Lemmon Survey	·	2.1 km	MPC · JPL
407580	2011 AZ_{33}	—	October 2, 2009	Mount Lemmon	Mount Lemmon Survey	·	4.0 km	MPC · JPL
407581	2011 AW_{39}	—	January 27, 2006	Kitt Peak	Spacewatch	·	1.9 km	MPC · JPL
407582	2011 AQ_{44}	—	September 24, 2009	Kitt Peak	Spacewatch	·	3.0 km	MPC · JPL
407583	2011 AE_{46}	—	January 5, 2000	Kitt Peak	Spacewatch	·	2.6 km	MPC · JPL
407584	2011 AL_{47}	—	January 11, 2011	Catalina	CSS	·	3.9 km	MPC · JPL
407585	2011 AA_{48}	—	December 26, 2005	Mount Lemmon	Mount Lemmon Survey	EOS	1.9 km	MPC · JPL
407586	2011 AD_{48}	—	January 21, 2010	WISE	WISE	·	3.7 km	MPC · JPL
407587	2011 AF_{55}	—	December 6, 2010	Mount Lemmon	Mount Lemmon Survey	·	3.1 km	MPC · JPL
407588	2011 AE_{56}	—	August 29, 2009	Kitt Peak	Spacewatch	·	1.6 km	MPC · JPL
407589	2011 AG_{61}	—	May 16, 2007	Mount Lemmon	Mount Lemmon Survey	·	3.8 km	MPC · JPL
407590	2011 AU_{65}	—	September 19, 2003	Kitt Peak	Spacewatch	·	2.7 km	MPC · JPL
407591	2011 AF_{68}	—	September 20, 2003	Kitt Peak	Spacewatch	·	3.0 km	MPC · JPL
407592	2011 AK_{72}	—	December 11, 2001	Socorro	LINEAR	·	2.4 km	MPC · JPL
407593	2011 AH_{75}	—	November 3, 2010	Mount Lemmon	Mount Lemmon Survey	·	3.9 km	MPC · JPL
407594	2011 AT_{75}	—	September 28, 2003	Anderson Mesa	LONEOS	·	3.2 km	MPC · JPL
407595	2011 AR_{76}	—	November 11, 2010	Mount Lemmon	Mount Lemmon Survey	EOS	2.3 km	MPC · JPL
407596	2011 AL_{78}	—	January 23, 2006	Kitt Peak	Spacewatch	EOS	1.9 km	MPC · JPL
407597	2011 AQ_{79}	—	January 30, 2006	Kitt Peak	Spacewatch	EOS	2.3 km	MPC · JPL
407598	2011 BP_{9}	—	October 30, 2009	Mount Lemmon	Mount Lemmon Survey	·	3.4 km	MPC · JPL
407599	2011 BQ_{10}	—	January 12, 2011	Kitt Peak	Spacewatch	·	3.4 km	MPC · JPL
407600	2011 BV_{27}	—	March 13, 2005	Mount Lemmon	Mount Lemmon Survey	·	4.5 km	MPC · JPL

== 407601–407700 ==
back to top

Designation			Discovery			Properties		Ref
Permanent	Provisional	Named after	Date	Site	Discoverer(s)	Category	Diam.	Ref
407601	2011 BO_{32}	—	September 17, 2009	Kitt Peak	Spacewatch	·	3.0 km	MPC · JPL
407602	2011 BL_{52}	—	February 27, 2000	Catalina	CSS	·	3.5 km	MPC · JPL
407603	2011 BA_{54}	—	February 7, 2000	Kitt Peak	Spacewatch	·	2.8 km	MPC · JPL
407604	2011 BS_{56}	—	November 21, 2009	Mount Lemmon	Mount Lemmon Survey	EMA	3.2 km	MPC · JPL
407605	2011 BB_{60}	—	November 4, 2004	Kitt Peak	Spacewatch	EOS	2.4 km	MPC · JPL
407606	2011 BR_{80}	—	October 16, 2009	Catalina	CSS	·	3.4 km	MPC · JPL
407607	2011 BD_{83}	—	November 4, 2005	Mount Lemmon	Mount Lemmon Survey	AEO	1.2 km	MPC · JPL
407608	2011 BB_{96}	—	February 3, 2000	Kitt Peak	Spacewatch	·	3.0 km	MPC · JPL
407609	2011 BY_{100}	—	October 1, 2009	Mount Lemmon	Mount Lemmon Survey	LIX	3.2 km	MPC · JPL
407610	2011 BZ_{102}	—	September 29, 2009	Mount Lemmon	Mount Lemmon Survey	·	2.5 km	MPC · JPL
407611	2011 BH_{115}	—	December 13, 2004	Kitt Peak	Spacewatch	THM	2.1 km	MPC · JPL
407612	2011 BX_{116}	—	January 26, 2006	Mount Lemmon	Mount Lemmon Survey	·	2.2 km	MPC · JPL
407613	2011 BC_{118}	—	January 9, 2006	Kitt Peak	Spacewatch	EOS	1.8 km	MPC · JPL
407614	2011 BB_{120}	—	September 17, 2003	Kitt Peak	Spacewatch	·	2.8 km	MPC · JPL
407615	2011 BH_{122}	—	October 21, 2003	Kitt Peak	Spacewatch	·	4.0 km	MPC · JPL
407616	2011 CP_{1}	—	January 22, 2010	WISE	WISE	·	3.7 km	MPC · JPL
407617	2011 CG_{4}	—	July 30, 2008	Kitt Peak	Spacewatch	·	4.6 km	MPC · JPL
407618	2011 CR_{7}	—	August 20, 2008	Kitt Peak	Spacewatch	T_{j} (2.99)	3.8 km	MPC · JPL
407619	2011 CZ_{15}	—	January 8, 1994	Kitt Peak	Spacewatch	·	2.8 km	MPC · JPL
407620	2011 CP_{16}	—	February 25, 2006	Kitt Peak	Spacewatch	·	2.6 km	MPC · JPL
407621	2011 CN_{23}	—	September 19, 2003	Kitt Peak	Spacewatch	HYG	2.7 km	MPC · JPL
407622	2011 CD_{33}	—	October 14, 2004	Kitt Peak	Spacewatch	·	2.2 km	MPC · JPL
407623	2011 CU_{47}	—	January 13, 2011	Kitt Peak	Spacewatch	·	3.7 km	MPC · JPL
407624	2011 CF_{49}	—	September 20, 2003	Kitt Peak	Spacewatch	·	4.1 km	MPC · JPL
407625	2011 CU_{70}	—	January 16, 2005	Socorro	LINEAR	·	3.8 km	MPC · JPL
407626	2011 CL_{74}	—	February 12, 2011	Catalina	CSS	H	520 m	MPC · JPL
407627	2011 CO_{74}	—	November 3, 2004	Kitt Peak	Spacewatch	·	2.6 km	MPC · JPL
407628	2011 CY_{75}	—	December 10, 2004	Kitt Peak	Spacewatch	·	3.1 km	MPC · JPL
407629	2011 CA_{76}	—	October 26, 2009	Mount Lemmon	Mount Lemmon Survey	·	3.3 km	MPC · JPL
407630	2011 CF_{76}	—	December 28, 2005	Mount Lemmon	Mount Lemmon Survey	·	3.1 km	MPC · JPL
407631	2011 CP_{83}	—	September 6, 2008	Mount Lemmon	Mount Lemmon Survey	·	2.9 km	MPC · JPL
407632	2011 CZ_{91}	—	September 7, 2008	Mount Lemmon	Mount Lemmon Survey	·	3.1 km	MPC · JPL
407633	2011 DF	—	September 28, 2008	Catalina	CSS	CYB	4.3 km	MPC · JPL
407634	2011 DJ_{6}	—	February 27, 2006	Kitt Peak	Spacewatch	·	2.7 km	MPC · JPL
407635	2011 DB_{9}	—	February 22, 2006	Mount Lemmon	Mount Lemmon Survey	·	6.1 km	MPC · JPL
407636	2011 DV_{24}	—	December 5, 1999	Catalina	CSS	·	2.6 km	MPC · JPL
407637	2011 DQ_{31}	—	February 25, 2011	Kitt Peak	Spacewatch	H	650 m	MPC · JPL
407638	2011 DP_{41}	—	February 25, 2011	Mount Lemmon	Mount Lemmon Survey	·	3.6 km	MPC · JPL
407639	2011 DZ_{49}	—	March 2, 2005	Catalina	CSS	·	4.2 km	MPC · JPL
407640	2011 EM	—	October 16, 2009	Catalina	CSS	·	4.1 km	MPC · JPL
407641	2011 EF_{16}	—	April 1, 2000	Kitt Peak	Spacewatch	·	3.5 km	MPC · JPL
407642	2011 EQ_{54}	—	October 26, 2009	Mount Lemmon	Mount Lemmon Survey	·	4.5 km	MPC · JPL
407643	2011 EK_{63}	—	April 29, 2006	Kitt Peak	Spacewatch	THB	3.2 km	MPC · JPL
407644	2011 EL_{63}	—	June 1, 2006	Mount Lemmon	Mount Lemmon Survey	·	4.2 km	MPC · JPL
407645	2011 EF_{76}	—	October 3, 2003	Kitt Peak	Spacewatch	·	4.3 km	MPC · JPL
407646	2011 FB_{3}	—	September 29, 2003	Kitt Peak	Spacewatch	·	5.4 km	MPC · JPL
407647	2011 FM_{17}	—	April 20, 2006	Catalina	CSS	H	500 m	MPC · JPL
407648	2011 FU_{47}	—	March 29, 2011	Kitt Peak	Spacewatch	H	640 m	MPC · JPL
407649	2011 FK_{70}	—	January 16, 2005	Socorro	LINEAR	EUP	3.6 km	MPC · JPL
407650	2011 FV_{123}	—	September 9, 2008	Mount Lemmon	Mount Lemmon Survey	·	3.7 km	MPC · JPL
407651	2011 GJ_{56}	—	March 9, 2005	Catalina	CSS	·	3.3 km	MPC · JPL
407652	2011 GK_{88}	—	January 27, 2006	Mount Lemmon	Mount Lemmon Survey	·	4.0 km	MPC · JPL
407653	2011 QF_{3}	—	August 20, 2011	Haleakala	Pan-STARRS 1	AMO · APO +1km	1.4 km	MPC · JPL
407654	2011 SP_{37}	—	September 28, 1992	Kitt Peak	Spacewatch	·	650 m	MPC · JPL
407655	2011 SF_{100}	—	April 11, 2010	Kitt Peak	Spacewatch	·	770 m	MPC · JPL
407656	2011 SL_{102}	—	May 17, 2009	Kitt Peak	Spacewatch	AMO +1km	810 m	MPC · JPL
407657	2011 SM_{139}	—	November 1, 2008	Mount Lemmon	Mount Lemmon Survey	·	640 m	MPC · JPL
407658	2011 SS_{159}	—	May 6, 2010	Mount Lemmon	Mount Lemmon Survey	V	710 m	MPC · JPL
407659	2011 SU_{163}	—	September 23, 2011	Kitt Peak	Spacewatch	·	700 m	MPC · JPL
407660	2011 SD_{166}	—	September 16, 2004	Kitt Peak	Spacewatch	·	600 m	MPC · JPL
407661	2011 SV_{166}	—	January 7, 2006	Kitt Peak	Spacewatch	·	660 m	MPC · JPL
407662	2011 SR_{177}	—	September 8, 2011	Kitt Peak	Spacewatch	·	750 m	MPC · JPL
407663	2011 SO_{179}	—	September 22, 2004	Socorro	LINEAR	·	2.1 km	MPC · JPL
407664	2011 SG_{181}	—	September 26, 2011	Kitt Peak	Spacewatch	·	1.1 km	MPC · JPL
407665	2011 SN_{182}	—	September 19, 2001	Socorro	LINEAR	·	480 m	MPC · JPL
407666	2011 SL_{183}	—	March 31, 2009	Mount Lemmon	Mount Lemmon Survey	·	2.1 km	MPC · JPL
407667	2011 SY_{185}	—	October 29, 2008	Kitt Peak	Spacewatch	·	670 m	MPC · JPL
407668	2011 SE_{189}	—	February 25, 2006	Kitt Peak	Spacewatch	·	720 m	MPC · JPL
407669	2011 SA_{220}	—	April 14, 2007	Mount Lemmon	Mount Lemmon Survey	·	550 m	MPC · JPL
407670	2011 SC_{228}	—	December 21, 2008	Kitt Peak	Spacewatch	·	690 m	MPC · JPL
407671	2011 SA_{253}	—	October 20, 2001	Socorro	LINEAR	·	640 m	MPC · JPL
407672	2011 SR_{260}	—	October 6, 2004	Kitt Peak	Spacewatch	·	1.3 km	MPC · JPL
407673	2011 SL_{274}	—	November 8, 2008	Mount Lemmon	Mount Lemmon Survey	·	800 m	MPC · JPL
407674	2011 UV_{14}	—	September 16, 2001	Socorro	LINEAR	·	830 m	MPC · JPL
407675	2011 UG_{27}	—	November 4, 2004	Kitt Peak	Spacewatch	V	570 m	MPC · JPL
407676	2011 UX_{27}	—	October 17, 2011	Kitt Peak	Spacewatch	·	830 m	MPC · JPL
407677	2011 UQ_{28}	—	September 30, 2011	Mount Lemmon	Mount Lemmon Survey	·	820 m	MPC · JPL
407678	2011 UE_{38}	—	February 19, 2009	Kitt Peak	Spacewatch	NYS	680 m	MPC · JPL
407679	2011 UD_{42}	—	November 7, 2008	Mount Lemmon	Mount Lemmon Survey	·	550 m	MPC · JPL
407680	2011 UT_{42}	—	September 30, 2011	Kitt Peak	Spacewatch	PHO	890 m	MPC · JPL
407681	2011 UC_{47}	—	September 30, 2011	Mount Lemmon	Mount Lemmon Survey	·	670 m	MPC · JPL
407682	2011 UN_{49}	—	November 19, 1998	Kitt Peak	Spacewatch	·	860 m	MPC · JPL
407683	2011 UJ_{54}	—	May 6, 2010	Mount Lemmon	Mount Lemmon Survey	·	680 m	MPC · JPL
407684	2011 UG_{55}	—	January 20, 2009	Catalina	CSS	·	740 m	MPC · JPL
407685	2011 UW_{59}	—	January 9, 2006	Kitt Peak	Spacewatch	·	550 m	MPC · JPL
407686	2011 UE_{69}	—	September 29, 2011	Mount Lemmon	Mount Lemmon Survey	·	2.7 km	MPC · JPL
407687	2011 UD_{83}	—	October 19, 2011	Kitt Peak	Spacewatch	(2076)	850 m	MPC · JPL
407688	2011 UE_{84}	—	December 19, 2004	Kitt Peak	Spacewatch	·	890 m	MPC · JPL
407689	2011 UO_{84}	—	October 19, 2011	Kitt Peak	Spacewatch	·	1.3 km	MPC · JPL
407690	2011 UK_{86}	—	October 20, 2011	Mount Lemmon	Mount Lemmon Survey	V	620 m	MPC · JPL
407691	2011 UJ_{87}	—	October 15, 1995	Kitt Peak	Spacewatch	·	500 m	MPC · JPL
407692	2011 UV_{91}	—	November 20, 2004	Kitt Peak	Spacewatch	·	780 m	MPC · JPL
407693	2011 UN_{96}	—	October 19, 2011	Mount Lemmon	Mount Lemmon Survey	·	800 m	MPC · JPL
407694	2011 UD_{100}	—	December 12, 2004	Kitt Peak	Spacewatch	·	850 m	MPC · JPL
407695	2011 UG_{102}	—	December 30, 2008	Mount Lemmon	Mount Lemmon Survey	·	600 m	MPC · JPL
407696	2011 UV_{102}	—	November 3, 2007	Mount Lemmon	Mount Lemmon Survey	·	1.5 km	MPC · JPL
407697	2011 UC_{114}	—	July 18, 2007	Mount Lemmon	Mount Lemmon Survey	NYS	780 m	MPC · JPL
407698	2011 UA_{121}	—	September 11, 2001	Anderson Mesa	LONEOS	·	530 m	MPC · JPL
407699	2011 UL_{123}	—	October 19, 2011	Mount Lemmon	Mount Lemmon Survey	·	1.1 km	MPC · JPL
407700	2011 UT_{123}	—	December 2, 2008	Kitt Peak	Spacewatch	·	580 m	MPC · JPL

== 407701–407800 ==
back to top

Designation			Discovery			Properties		Ref
Permanent	Provisional	Named after	Date	Site	Discoverer(s)	Category	Diam.	Ref
407701	2011 UH_{128}	—	December 16, 2004	Kitt Peak	Spacewatch	·	1.6 km	MPC · JPL
407702	2011 UV_{134}	—	November 11, 2004	Kitt Peak	Spacewatch	·	1.4 km	MPC · JPL
407703	2011 UG_{136}	—	March 4, 2010	WISE	WISE	·	2.5 km	MPC · JPL
407704	2011 UW_{149}	—	January 1, 2009	Mount Lemmon	Mount Lemmon Survey	·	750 m	MPC · JPL
407705	2011 UB_{153}	—	June 15, 2010	Mount Lemmon	Mount Lemmon Survey	V	670 m	MPC · JPL
407706	2011 UG_{155}	—	December 5, 2008	Mount Lemmon	Mount Lemmon Survey	·	700 m	MPC · JPL
407707	2011 UN_{164}	—	January 23, 2006	Kitt Peak	Spacewatch	·	770 m	MPC · JPL
407708	2011 UO_{194}	—	October 4, 2004	Kitt Peak	Spacewatch	·	800 m	MPC · JPL
407709	2011 UY_{196}	—	September 10, 2007	Mount Lemmon	Mount Lemmon Survey	·	860 m	MPC · JPL
407710	2011 UA_{202}	—	September 27, 2011	Mount Lemmon	Mount Lemmon Survey	·	860 m	MPC · JPL
407711	2011 UF_{213}	—	October 1, 2011	Kitt Peak	Spacewatch	·	940 m	MPC · JPL
407712	2011 UE_{251}	—	February 2, 2009	Mount Lemmon	Mount Lemmon Survey	·	660 m	MPC · JPL
407713	2011 UB_{258}	—	December 21, 2008	Mount Lemmon	Mount Lemmon Survey	·	540 m	MPC · JPL
407714	2011 UV_{265}	—	October 10, 2004	Kitt Peak	Spacewatch	·	680 m	MPC · JPL
407715	2011 UD_{268}	—	April 18, 2009	Catalina	CSS	HNS	1.4 km	MPC · JPL
407716	2011 UK_{269}	—	November 4, 2004	Catalina	CSS	·	990 m	MPC · JPL
407717	2011 US_{269}	—	January 29, 2009	Mount Lemmon	Mount Lemmon Survey	·	910 m	MPC · JPL
407718	2011 UM_{271}	—	January 14, 1999	Kitt Peak	Spacewatch	·	560 m	MPC · JPL
407719	2011 UX_{274}	—	December 5, 2005	Mount Lemmon	Mount Lemmon Survey	·	730 m	MPC · JPL
407720	2011 UE_{294}	—	October 21, 2011	Mount Lemmon	Mount Lemmon Survey	MAS	590 m	MPC · JPL
407721	2011 UN_{295}	—	November 2, 2000	Kitt Peak	Spacewatch	·	1.3 km	MPC · JPL
407722	2011 UW_{297}	—	October 17, 2011	Kitt Peak	Spacewatch	·	870 m	MPC · JPL
407723	2011 UF_{302}	—	September 17, 2004	Kitt Peak	Spacewatch	·	670 m	MPC · JPL
407724	2011 UQ_{306}	—	March 10, 2002	Kitt Peak	Spacewatch	·	730 m	MPC · JPL
407725	2011 UZ_{307}	—	December 1, 2008	Mount Lemmon	Mount Lemmon Survey	·	640 m	MPC · JPL
407726	2011 UQ_{308}	—	October 28, 2011	Mount Lemmon	Mount Lemmon Survey	·	700 m	MPC · JPL
407727	2011 UG_{319}	—	December 16, 2004	Kitt Peak	Spacewatch	MAS	610 m	MPC · JPL
407728	2011 UG_{320}	—	February 22, 2009	Kitt Peak	Spacewatch	·	640 m	MPC · JPL
407729	2011 UH_{328}	—	October 19, 2011	Kitt Peak	Spacewatch	·	740 m	MPC · JPL
407730	2011 UV_{337}	—	September 20, 2011	Mount Lemmon	Mount Lemmon Survey	·	910 m	MPC · JPL
407731	2011 UP_{338}	—	October 20, 2008	Kitt Peak	Spacewatch	·	710 m	MPC · JPL
407732	2011 UH_{343}	—	April 26, 2010	Mount Lemmon	Mount Lemmon Survey	·	920 m	MPC · JPL
407733	2011 UO_{346}	—	November 24, 2008	Mount Lemmon	Mount Lemmon Survey	·	730 m	MPC · JPL
407734	2011 US_{356}	—	January 15, 2009	Kitt Peak	Spacewatch	·	630 m	MPC · JPL
407735	2011 UJ_{366}	—	February 14, 2000	Kitt Peak	Spacewatch	·	690 m	MPC · JPL
407736	2011 UX_{369}	—	September 16, 2001	Socorro	LINEAR	·	560 m	MPC · JPL
407737	2011 UZ_{382}	—	December 27, 1997	Kitt Peak	Spacewatch	·	1.1 km	MPC · JPL
407738	2011 UN_{398}	—	October 25, 2008	Kitt Peak	Spacewatch	·	780 m	MPC · JPL
407739	2011 UV_{401}	—	December 30, 2000	Kitt Peak	Spacewatch	·	1.2 km	MPC · JPL
407740	2011 UX_{401}	—	March 20, 2007	Mount Lemmon	Mount Lemmon Survey	·	550 m	MPC · JPL
407741	2011 VH_{8}	—	September 2, 1998	Kitt Peak	Spacewatch	·	660 m	MPC · JPL
407742	2011 VH_{12}	—	October 23, 2011	Kitt Peak	Spacewatch	·	670 m	MPC · JPL
407743	2011 VQ_{16}	—	March 3, 2009	Mount Lemmon	Mount Lemmon Survey	·	1.0 km	MPC · JPL
407744	2011 VS_{16}	—	October 9, 2007	Socorro	LINEAR	·	1.3 km	MPC · JPL
407745	2011 VQ_{20}	—	January 2, 2009	Kitt Peak	Spacewatch	·	640 m	MPC · JPL
407746	2011 VO_{21}	—	October 7, 2008	Mount Lemmon	Mount Lemmon Survey	·	650 m	MPC · JPL
407747	2011 WM_{1}	—	May 7, 2006	Mount Lemmon	Mount Lemmon Survey	·	810 m	MPC · JPL
407748	2011 WZ_{10}	—	April 19, 2009	Mount Lemmon	Mount Lemmon Survey	·	1.7 km	MPC · JPL
407749	2011 WG_{13}	—	August 19, 2001	Socorro	LINEAR	·	820 m	MPC · JPL
407750	2011 WE_{17}	—	November 13, 2007	Kitt Peak	Spacewatch	·	1.2 km	MPC · JPL
407751	2011 WM_{22}	—	September 15, 2007	Kitt Peak	Spacewatch	·	950 m	MPC · JPL
407752	2011 WB_{27}	—	December 18, 2004	Mount Lemmon	Mount Lemmon Survey	·	940 m	MPC · JPL
407753	2011 WR_{33}	—	November 4, 2004	Kitt Peak	Spacewatch	·	700 m	MPC · JPL
407754	2011 WQ_{35}	—	November 15, 2011	Kitt Peak	Spacewatch	·	720 m	MPC · JPL
407755	2011 WO_{42}	—	February 20, 2009	Kitt Peak	Spacewatch	(5)	1.7 km	MPC · JPL
407756	2011 WM_{48}	—	March 16, 2007	Catalina	CSS	·	3.3 km	MPC · JPL
407757	2011 WW_{54}	—	December 15, 2004	Campo Imperatore	CINEOS	·	940 m	MPC · JPL
407758	2011 WE_{57}	—	April 26, 2006	Kitt Peak	Spacewatch	·	1.0 km	MPC · JPL
407759	2011 WZ_{60}	—	January 31, 2009	Kitt Peak	Spacewatch	·	720 m	MPC · JPL
407760	2011 WH_{63}	—	February 1, 2009	Kitt Peak	Spacewatch	·	660 m	MPC · JPL
407761	2011 WE_{68}	—	December 30, 2008	Kitt Peak	Spacewatch	·	540 m	MPC · JPL
407762	2011 WL_{70}	—	February 28, 2009	Kitt Peak	Spacewatch	·	650 m	MPC · JPL
407763	2011 WE_{76}	—	May 11, 2010	Mount Lemmon	Mount Lemmon Survey	·	1.5 km	MPC · JPL
407764	2011 WM_{76}	—	November 9, 2007	Kitt Peak	Spacewatch	KON	2.8 km	MPC · JPL
407765	2011 WK_{79}	—	December 4, 1996	Kitt Peak	Spacewatch	NYS	1.2 km	MPC · JPL
407766	2011 WB_{82}	—	November 1, 2007	Mount Lemmon	Mount Lemmon Survey	·	1.1 km	MPC · JPL
407767	2011 WU_{88}	—	September 9, 2007	Anderson Mesa	LONEOS	·	1.0 km	MPC · JPL
407768	2011 WT_{89}	—	January 31, 2009	Mount Lemmon	Mount Lemmon Survey	·	730 m	MPC · JPL
407769	2011 WX_{89}	—	September 7, 2004	Kitt Peak	Spacewatch	·	640 m	MPC · JPL
407770	2011 WD_{93}	—	March 19, 2009	Mount Lemmon	Mount Lemmon Survey	·	1.1 km	MPC · JPL
407771	2011 WD_{109}	—	December 18, 2001	Socorro	LINEAR	·	710 m	MPC · JPL
407772	2011 WS_{110}	—	April 25, 2003	Kitt Peak	Spacewatch	·	700 m	MPC · JPL
407773	2011 WV_{114}	—	January 7, 2005	Campo Imperatore	CINEOS	·	1.0 km	MPC · JPL
407774	2011 WE_{115}	—	December 19, 2007	Mount Lemmon	Mount Lemmon Survey	526	2.6 km	MPC · JPL
407775	2011 WY_{116}	—	September 10, 2007	Mount Lemmon	Mount Lemmon Survey	NYS	810 m	MPC · JPL
407776	2011 WK_{121}	—	January 18, 2005	Kitt Peak	Spacewatch	·	1.1 km	MPC · JPL
407777	2011 WL_{128}	—	November 17, 2011	Kitt Peak	Spacewatch	·	930 m	MPC · JPL
407778	2011 WA_{129}	—	September 2, 2007	Mount Lemmon	Mount Lemmon Survey	·	880 m	MPC · JPL
407779	2011 WP_{147}	—	September 13, 2007	Mount Lemmon	Mount Lemmon Survey	·	1.0 km	MPC · JPL
407780	2011 WQ_{153}	—	November 18, 2003	Kitt Peak	Spacewatch	·	1.3 km	MPC · JPL
407781	2011 YU_{1}	—	March 4, 2005	Mount Lemmon	Mount Lemmon Survey	MAS	790 m	MPC · JPL
407782	2011 YW_{2}	—	March 9, 2005	Kitt Peak	Spacewatch	·	1.3 km	MPC · JPL
407783	2011 YM_{4}	—	December 16, 2007	Mount Lemmon	Mount Lemmon Survey	MAR	1.1 km	MPC · JPL
407784	2011 YS_{5}	—	January 13, 2008	Mount Lemmon	Mount Lemmon Survey	KON	3.2 km	MPC · JPL
407785	2011 YX_{5}	—	November 7, 2007	Catalina	CSS	·	1.5 km	MPC · JPL
407786	2011 YD_{6}	—	August 28, 2006	Kitt Peak	Spacewatch	·	1.2 km	MPC · JPL
407787	2011 YQ_{7}	—	September 28, 2006	Catalina	CSS	ADE	2.2 km	MPC · JPL
407788	2011 YA_{9}	—	March 31, 2009	Mount Lemmon	Mount Lemmon Survey	·	1.3 km	MPC · JPL
407789	2011 YT_{17}	—	November 30, 2003	Socorro	LINEAR	·	1.4 km	MPC · JPL
407790	2011 YL_{18}	—	January 17, 2009	Kitt Peak	Spacewatch	·	680 m	MPC · JPL
407791	2011 YT_{19}	—	October 21, 2003	Kitt Peak	Spacewatch	NYS	1.1 km	MPC · JPL
407792	2011 YX_{19}	—	October 11, 2010	Mount Lemmon	Mount Lemmon Survey	·	2.0 km	MPC · JPL
407793	2011 YF_{20}	—	December 27, 2003	Socorro	LINEAR	·	1.5 km	MPC · JPL
407794	2011 YH_{21}	—	October 19, 2007	Mount Lemmon	Mount Lemmon Survey	MAR	1.0 km	MPC · JPL
407795	2011 YJ_{25}	—	October 19, 1999	Kitt Peak	Spacewatch	·	1.2 km	MPC · JPL
407796	2011 YO_{33}	—	December 10, 2004	Kitt Peak	Spacewatch	·	620 m	MPC · JPL
407797	2011 YS_{35}	—	November 27, 2011	Mount Lemmon	Mount Lemmon Survey	·	1.5 km	MPC · JPL
407798	2011 YV_{46}	—	February 10, 2008	Kitt Peak	Spacewatch	·	1.1 km	MPC · JPL
407799	2011 YS_{50}	—	February 10, 2008	Kitt Peak	Spacewatch	·	1.5 km	MPC · JPL
407800	2011 YV_{51}	—	April 17, 2005	Kitt Peak	Spacewatch	·	1.3 km	MPC · JPL

== 407801–407900 ==
back to top

Designation			Discovery			Properties		Ref
Permanent	Provisional	Named after	Date	Site	Discoverer(s)	Category	Diam.	Ref
407801	2011 YF_{54}	—	January 13, 2005	Kitt Peak	Spacewatch	·	820 m	MPC · JPL
407802	2011 YA_{61}	—	February 10, 2008	Catalina	CSS	(5)	1.3 km	MPC · JPL
407803	2011 YJ_{67}	—	December 31, 2011	Kitt Peak	Spacewatch	·	2.4 km	MPC · JPL
407804	2011 YB_{68}	—	November 12, 2007	Mount Lemmon	Mount Lemmon Survey	·	1.5 km	MPC · JPL
407805	2011 YY_{72}	—	September 12, 2007	Mount Lemmon	Mount Lemmon Survey	(2076)	790 m	MPC · JPL
407806	2011 YQ_{73}	—	November 17, 2006	Kitt Peak	Spacewatch	·	1.6 km	MPC · JPL
407807	2011 YP_{75}	—	December 3, 2004	Kitt Peak	Spacewatch	·	700 m	MPC · JPL
407808	2012 AK_{3}	—	January 22, 2004	Socorro	LINEAR	·	1.1 km	MPC · JPL
407809	2012 AC_{4}	—	September 28, 2003	Anderson Mesa	LONEOS	·	1.4 km	MPC · JPL
407810	2012 AN_{4}	—	June 3, 2005	Kitt Peak	Spacewatch	·	2.2 km	MPC · JPL
407811	2012 AZ_{5}	—	December 13, 2007	Socorro	LINEAR	·	1.7 km	MPC · JPL
407812	2012 AP_{6}	—	February 22, 2004	Kitt Peak	Spacewatch	(5)	1.0 km	MPC · JPL
407813	2012 AE_{7}	—	October 19, 2007	Mount Lemmon	Mount Lemmon Survey	MAR	1.3 km	MPC · JPL
407814	2012 AP_{8}	—	November 2, 2007	Catalina	CSS	·	1.4 km	MPC · JPL
407815	2012 AY_{8}	—	November 25, 2006	Mount Lemmon	Mount Lemmon Survey	615	1.3 km	MPC · JPL
407816	2012 AR_{9}	—	February 21, 2007	Mount Lemmon	Mount Lemmon Survey	·	2.6 km	MPC · JPL
407817	2012 AW_{13}	—	January 14, 2012	Kitt Peak	Spacewatch	·	3.6 km	MPC · JPL
407818	2012 AG_{14}	—	October 3, 2006	Mount Lemmon	Mount Lemmon Survey	·	1.6 km	MPC · JPL
407819	2012 AU_{18}	—	January 12, 2008	Kitt Peak	Spacewatch	·	1.1 km	MPC · JPL
407820	2012 AR_{21}	—	December 16, 2004	Anderson Mesa	LONEOS	·	920 m	MPC · JPL
407821	2012 BS	—	September 30, 2003	Kitt Peak	Spacewatch	·	1.2 km	MPC · JPL
407822	2012 BT	—	November 2, 2007	Mount Lemmon	Mount Lemmon Survey	·	930 m	MPC · JPL
407823	2012 BR_{4}	—	November 19, 2003	Anderson Mesa	LONEOS	·	1.5 km	MPC · JPL
407824	2012 BF_{5}	—	January 10, 2008	Mount Lemmon	Mount Lemmon Survey	·	1.3 km	MPC · JPL
407825	2012 BZ_{12}	—	January 21, 2012	Haleakala	Pan-STARRS 1	·	2.5 km	MPC · JPL
407826	2012 BG_{13}	—	November 24, 2003	Anderson Mesa	LONEOS	·	2.1 km	MPC · JPL
407827	2012 BR_{15}	—	October 19, 2007	Catalina	CSS	·	940 m	MPC · JPL
407828	2012 BX_{15}	—	June 21, 2010	WISE	WISE	·	2.0 km	MPC · JPL
407829	2012 BS_{17}	—	October 25, 2005	Kitt Peak	Spacewatch	·	2.3 km	MPC · JPL
407830	2012 BG_{18}	—	October 1, 2010	Catalina	CSS	·	1.4 km	MPC · JPL
407831	2012 BN_{18}	—	March 26, 2003	Kitt Peak	Spacewatch	·	2.8 km	MPC · JPL
407832	2012 BF_{19}	—	September 7, 1999	Kitt Peak	Spacewatch	·	1.6 km	MPC · JPL
407833	2012 BJ_{24}	—	January 22, 2012	La Sagra	OAM	EUP	4.3 km	MPC · JPL
407834	2012 BL_{24}	—	February 22, 2001	Kitt Peak	Spacewatch	NYS	1.5 km	MPC · JPL
407835	2012 BT_{24}	—	July 29, 2009	Kitt Peak	Spacewatch	·	3.4 km	MPC · JPL
407836	2012 BV_{24}	—	June 23, 2009	Mount Lemmon	Mount Lemmon Survey	·	2.6 km	MPC · JPL
407837	2012 BD_{25}	—	January 1, 2012	Mount Lemmon	Mount Lemmon Survey	HNS	1.3 km	MPC · JPL
407838	2012 BC_{26}	—	July 7, 2005	Kitt Peak	Spacewatch	·	2.4 km	MPC · JPL
407839	2012 BC_{29}	—	November 24, 2006	Mount Lemmon	Mount Lemmon Survey	AST	1.5 km	MPC · JPL
407840	2012 BS_{29}	—	January 1, 2012	Mount Lemmon	Mount Lemmon Survey	ARM	3.9 km	MPC · JPL
407841	2012 BJ_{30}	—	March 10, 2008	Siding Spring	SSS	·	2.1 km	MPC · JPL
407842	2012 BL_{32}	—	April 19, 2004	Socorro	LINEAR	·	3.3 km	MPC · JPL
407843	2012 BU_{32}	—	January 18, 2008	Catalina	CSS	·	4.6 km	MPC · JPL
407844	2012 BF_{33}	—	November 5, 2010	Mount Lemmon	Mount Lemmon Survey	EOS	1.9 km	MPC · JPL
407845	2012 BH_{35}	—	December 19, 2001	Kitt Peak	Spacewatch	·	700 m	MPC · JPL
407846	2012 BW_{44}	—	November 19, 2007	Mount Lemmon	Mount Lemmon Survey	·	1.2 km	MPC · JPL
407847	2012 BT_{52}	—	February 7, 2008	Kitt Peak	Spacewatch	·	1.1 km	MPC · JPL
407848	2012 BZ_{52}	—	January 21, 2012	Kitt Peak	Spacewatch	·	2.3 km	MPC · JPL
407849	2012 BC_{54}	—	February 12, 1999	Kitt Peak	Spacewatch	·	2.3 km	MPC · JPL
407850	2012 BL_{54}	—	December 4, 2007	Catalina	CSS	ERI	1.6 km	MPC · JPL
407851	2012 BW_{54}	—	March 5, 1994	Kitt Peak	Spacewatch	MRX	1.1 km	MPC · JPL
407852	2012 BV_{55}	—	November 12, 2010	Mount Lemmon	Mount Lemmon Survey	EOS	1.8 km	MPC · JPL
407853	2012 BC_{60}	—	October 5, 2000	Kitt Peak	Spacewatch	·	700 m	MPC · JPL
407854	2012 BF_{62}	—	September 8, 2010	Kitt Peak	Spacewatch	·	2.1 km	MPC · JPL
407855	2012 BV_{64}	—	June 29, 2010	WISE	WISE	HOF	2.5 km	MPC · JPL
407856	2012 BS_{66}	—	April 6, 2008	Mount Lemmon	Mount Lemmon Survey	·	1.6 km	MPC · JPL
407857	2012 BM_{68}	—	April 14, 2008	Mount Lemmon	Mount Lemmon Survey	·	2.1 km	MPC · JPL
407858	2012 BN_{69}	—	January 21, 2012	Kitt Peak	Spacewatch	·	2.6 km	MPC · JPL
407859	2012 BJ_{70}	—	February 8, 2008	Mount Lemmon	Mount Lemmon Survey	·	1.2 km	MPC · JPL
407860	2012 BS_{70}	—	March 27, 2008	Mount Lemmon	Mount Lemmon Survey	·	1.6 km	MPC · JPL
407861	2012 BG_{71}	—	January 21, 2012	Kitt Peak	Spacewatch	(5651)	3.0 km	MPC · JPL
407862	2012 BC_{72}	—	September 25, 2006	Kitt Peak	Spacewatch	·	1.2 km	MPC · JPL
407863	2012 BM_{72}	—	September 14, 2005	Kitt Peak	Spacewatch	·	2.0 km	MPC · JPL
407864	2012 BR_{72}	—	September 6, 2008	Mount Lemmon	Mount Lemmon Survey	·	4.3 km	MPC · JPL
407865	2012 BX_{72}	—	March 13, 2007	Kitt Peak	Spacewatch	·	2.4 km	MPC · JPL
407866	2012 BJ_{73}	—	November 9, 1999	Socorro	LINEAR	·	1.6 km	MPC · JPL
407867	2012 BH_{81}	—	January 19, 2012	Kitt Peak	Spacewatch	·	3.2 km	MPC · JPL
407868	2012 BG_{82}	—	October 26, 2005	Kitt Peak	Spacewatch	·	2.4 km	MPC · JPL
407869	2012 BS_{85}	—	November 5, 1999	Kitt Peak	Spacewatch	·	1.2 km	MPC · JPL
407870	2012 BQ_{86}	—	March 16, 2007	Catalina	CSS	T_{j} (2.99)	4.4 km	MPC · JPL
407871	2012 BB_{90}	—	December 6, 2005	Kitt Peak	Spacewatch	·	2.4 km	MPC · JPL
407872	2012 BM_{90}	—	March 27, 2008	Mount Lemmon	Mount Lemmon Survey	·	1.7 km	MPC · JPL
407873	2012 BM_{91}	—	December 7, 2005	Kitt Peak	Spacewatch	·	3.0 km	MPC · JPL
407874	2012 BN_{91}	—	January 15, 2008	Kitt Peak	Spacewatch	·	1.7 km	MPC · JPL
407875	2012 BD_{92}	—	November 4, 2007	Mount Lemmon	Mount Lemmon Survey	·	1.2 km	MPC · JPL
407876	2012 BL_{93}	—	September 17, 2010	Mount Lemmon	Mount Lemmon Survey	·	1.9 km	MPC · JPL
407877	2012 BT_{93}	—	November 17, 2011	Kitt Peak	Spacewatch	NYS	1.1 km	MPC · JPL
407878	2012 BN_{100}	—	November 12, 2006	Mount Lemmon	Mount Lemmon Survey	·	1.3 km	MPC · JPL
407879	2012 BD_{103}	—	March 31, 2009	Mount Lemmon	Mount Lemmon Survey	·	1.6 km	MPC · JPL
407880	2012 BE_{103}	—	March 27, 2008	Kitt Peak	Spacewatch	·	1.4 km	MPC · JPL
407881	2012 BP_{103}	—	February 22, 2007	Siding Spring	SSS	·	4.4 km	MPC · JPL
407882	2012 BG_{104}	—	November 9, 1999	Kitt Peak	Spacewatch	NYS	1.1 km	MPC · JPL
407883	2012 BQ_{104}	—	August 28, 2006	Kitt Peak	Spacewatch	(5)	1.1 km	MPC · JPL
407884	2012 BL_{106}	—	December 4, 2007	Catalina	CSS	V	680 m	MPC · JPL
407885	2012 BR_{107}	—	November 20, 2006	Kitt Peak	Spacewatch	·	1.5 km	MPC · JPL
407886	2012 BF_{110}	—	January 26, 2001	Kitt Peak	Spacewatch	NYS	980 m	MPC · JPL
407887	2012 BW_{110}	—	August 16, 2009	Kitt Peak	Spacewatch	·	2.8 km	MPC · JPL
407888	2012 BE_{111}	—	October 20, 1995	Kitt Peak	Spacewatch	NYS	920 m	MPC · JPL
407889	2012 BM_{111}	—	October 17, 2010	Mount Lemmon	Mount Lemmon Survey	·	2.4 km	MPC · JPL
407890	2012 BR_{111}	—	November 8, 2007	Mount Lemmon	Mount Lemmon Survey	MAS	970 m	MPC · JPL
407891	2012 BA_{112}	—	December 16, 2007	Mount Lemmon	Mount Lemmon Survey	ERI	1.4 km	MPC · JPL
407892	2012 BM_{117}	—	October 16, 2003	Kitt Peak	Spacewatch	MAS	470 m	MPC · JPL
407893	2012 BH_{122}	—	February 7, 1999	Kitt Peak	Spacewatch	·	1.3 km	MPC · JPL
407894	2012 BW_{124}	—	March 16, 2009	Kitt Peak	Spacewatch	·	810 m	MPC · JPL
407895	2012 BP_{125}	—	October 13, 2006	Kitt Peak	Spacewatch	·	1.4 km	MPC · JPL
407896	2012 BW_{125}	—	March 11, 2007	Kitt Peak	Spacewatch	·	2.7 km	MPC · JPL
407897	2012 BG_{127}	—	March 11, 2005	Kitt Peak	Spacewatch	·	1.3 km	MPC · JPL
407898	2012 BZ_{128}	—	November 11, 2007	Mount Lemmon	Mount Lemmon Survey	NYS	1.3 km	MPC · JPL
407899	2012 BQ_{136}	—	November 20, 2006	Kitt Peak	Spacewatch	·	1.6 km	MPC · JPL
407900	2012 BV_{136}	—	January 30, 2008	Mount Lemmon	Mount Lemmon Survey	·	1.1 km	MPC · JPL

== 407901–408000 ==
back to top

Designation			Discovery			Properties		Ref
Permanent	Provisional	Named after	Date	Site	Discoverer(s)	Category	Diam.	Ref
407901	2012 BN_{142}	—	February 12, 2008	Kitt Peak	Spacewatch	·	1.4 km	MPC · JPL
407902	2012 BR_{142}	—	December 4, 2007	Kitt Peak	Spacewatch	NYS	1.3 km	MPC · JPL
407903	2012 BO_{143}	—	September 16, 2006	Kitt Peak	Spacewatch	KON	2.2 km	MPC · JPL
407904	2012 BK_{144}	—	September 15, 2006	Kitt Peak	Spacewatch	·	940 m	MPC · JPL
407905	2012 BB_{145}	—	March 8, 2008	Mount Lemmon	Mount Lemmon Survey	·	1.6 km	MPC · JPL
407906	2012 BG_{145}	—	December 2, 2010	Mount Lemmon	Mount Lemmon Survey	·	1.8 km	MPC · JPL
407907	2012 BJ_{149}	—	October 9, 2005	Kitt Peak	Spacewatch	·	2.3 km	MPC · JPL
407908	2012 BK_{149}	—	August 29, 2005	Kitt Peak	Spacewatch	AGN	1.3 km	MPC · JPL
407909	2012 BT_{150}	—	March 13, 2008	Catalina	CSS	·	2.3 km	MPC · JPL
407910	2012 BU_{152}	—	March 11, 2007	Kitt Peak	Spacewatch	·	3.9 km	MPC · JPL
407911	2012 CF_{6}	—	January 31, 2012	Catalina	CSS	·	2.4 km	MPC · JPL
407912	2012 CV_{6}	—	October 13, 2010	Mount Lemmon	Mount Lemmon Survey	·	2.5 km	MPC · JPL
407913	2012 CC_{7}	—	December 21, 2006	Kitt Peak	Spacewatch	·	1.9 km	MPC · JPL
407914	2012 CC_{8}	—	December 10, 2005	Kitt Peak	Spacewatch	·	2.7 km	MPC · JPL
407915	2012 CR_{8}	—	November 2, 2010	Mount Lemmon	Mount Lemmon Survey	·	1.6 km	MPC · JPL
407916	2012 CA_{9}	—	December 25, 1992	Kitt Peak	Spacewatch	MAS	680 m	MPC · JPL
407917	2012 CH_{10}	—	March 1, 1995	Kitt Peak	Spacewatch	·	3.0 km	MPC · JPL
407918	2012 CU_{11}	—	February 2, 2008	Kitt Peak	Spacewatch	·	1.5 km	MPC · JPL
407919	2012 CR_{12}	—	August 30, 2005	Kitt Peak	Spacewatch	·	2.0 km	MPC · JPL
407920	2012 CJ_{15}	—	January 25, 2012	Kitt Peak	Spacewatch	·	1.4 km	MPC · JPL
407921	2012 CJ_{16}	—	December 30, 2005	Kitt Peak	Spacewatch	·	3.2 km	MPC · JPL
407922	2012 CP_{18}	—	November 13, 2006	Kitt Peak	Spacewatch	·	2.5 km	MPC · JPL
407923	2012 CC_{19}	—	November 3, 2011	Kitt Peak	Spacewatch	EUP	4.4 km	MPC · JPL
407924	2012 CM_{24}	—	February 27, 2008	Mount Lemmon	Mount Lemmon Survey	·	1.6 km	MPC · JPL
407925	2012 CO_{24}	—	September 17, 2006	Kitt Peak	Spacewatch	·	1.4 km	MPC · JPL
407926	2012 CT_{27}	—	December 10, 2010	Mount Lemmon	Mount Lemmon Survey	EOS	2.1 km	MPC · JPL
407927	2012 CD_{28}	—	December 13, 2006	Mount Lemmon	Mount Lemmon Survey	·	2.1 km	MPC · JPL
407928	2012 CP_{29}	—	March 31, 2008	Mount Lemmon	Mount Lemmon Survey	·	2.0 km	MPC · JPL
407929	2012 CP_{31}	—	November 24, 2006	Kitt Peak	Spacewatch	·	2.0 km	MPC · JPL
407930	2012 CP_{32}	—	September 18, 2010	Mount Lemmon	Mount Lemmon Survey	·	1.7 km	MPC · JPL
407931	2012 CZ_{32}	—	November 30, 2005	Kitt Peak	Spacewatch	·	3.0 km	MPC · JPL
407932	2012 CC_{34}	—	February 3, 2008	Kitt Peak	Spacewatch	·	1.3 km	MPC · JPL
407933	2012 CV_{34}	—	January 26, 2012	Mount Lemmon	Mount Lemmon Survey	HOF	2.4 km	MPC · JPL
407934	2012 CF_{37}	—	April 14, 2008	Mount Lemmon	Mount Lemmon Survey	EOS	2.2 km	MPC · JPL
407935	2012 CY_{37}	—	February 3, 2008	Kitt Peak	Spacewatch	·	1.2 km	MPC · JPL
407936	2012 CV_{40}	—	December 28, 2011	Mount Lemmon	Mount Lemmon Survey	·	3.2 km	MPC · JPL
407937	2012 CZ_{40}	—	February 2, 2001	Kitt Peak	Spacewatch	TIR	2.3 km	MPC · JPL
407938	2012 CH_{42}	—	November 14, 2010	Mount Lemmon	Mount Lemmon Survey	·	1.9 km	MPC · JPL
407939	2012 CN_{42}	—	February 23, 2007	Kitt Peak	Spacewatch	·	1.9 km	MPC · JPL
407940	2012 CZ_{44}	—	December 30, 2005	Kitt Peak	Spacewatch	·	2.4 km	MPC · JPL
407941	2012 CA_{45}	—	March 7, 2008	Mount Lemmon	Mount Lemmon Survey	·	2.5 km	MPC · JPL
407942	2012 CG_{45}	—	December 27, 2011	Mount Lemmon	Mount Lemmon Survey	·	3.2 km	MPC · JPL
407943	2012 CE_{50}	—	March 4, 2008	Mount Lemmon	Mount Lemmon Survey	·	1.3 km	MPC · JPL
407944	2012 CJ_{51}	—	September 27, 2006	Kitt Peak	Spacewatch	(5)	1.2 km	MPC · JPL
407945	2012 DA	—	December 1, 2006	Mount Lemmon	Mount Lemmon Survey	·	1.8 km	MPC · JPL
407946	2012 DF	—	September 29, 2005	Anderson Mesa	LONEOS	BRA	1.8 km	MPC · JPL
407947	2012 DH	—	April 1, 2008	Mount Lemmon	Mount Lemmon Survey	·	1.7 km	MPC · JPL
407948	2012 DF_{5}	—	February 8, 2008	Kitt Peak	Spacewatch	EUN	1.0 km	MPC · JPL
407949	2012 DJ_{5}	—	January 21, 2012	Haleakala	Pan-STARRS 1	·	3.3 km	MPC · JPL
407950	2012 DM_{6}	—	November 23, 2003	Kitt Peak	Spacewatch	·	1.2 km	MPC · JPL
407951	2012 DU_{6}	—	August 27, 2009	Kitt Peak	Spacewatch	·	3.1 km	MPC · JPL
407952	2012 DC_{8}	—	September 20, 2007	Kitt Peak	Spacewatch	·	930 m	MPC · JPL
407953	2012 DC_{9}	—	March 27, 2008	Mount Lemmon	Mount Lemmon Survey	(12739)	1.6 km	MPC · JPL
407954	2012 DQ_{9}	—	January 27, 2007	Mount Lemmon	Mount Lemmon Survey	·	2.0 km	MPC · JPL
407955	2012 DB_{10}	—	October 14, 2010	Mount Lemmon	Mount Lemmon Survey	·	1.5 km	MPC · JPL
407956	2012 DM_{12}	—	February 10, 2008	Mount Lemmon	Mount Lemmon Survey	·	1.9 km	MPC · JPL
407957	2012 DF_{15}	—	October 28, 2010	Catalina	CSS	·	1.9 km	MPC · JPL
407958	2012 DP_{17}	—	March 13, 2007	Kitt Peak	Spacewatch	·	1.6 km	MPC · JPL
407959	2012 DQ_{18}	—	January 19, 2012	Kitt Peak	Spacewatch	EOS	1.7 km	MPC · JPL
407960	2012 DA_{20}	—	January 28, 2006	Catalina	CSS	·	4.6 km	MPC · JPL
407961	2012 DR_{21}	—	March 24, 2003	Kitt Peak	Spacewatch	AEO	1.2 km	MPC · JPL
407962	2012 DO_{22}	—	April 10, 2002	Socorro	LINEAR	·	2.4 km	MPC · JPL
407963	2012 DV_{23}	—	December 15, 2006	Kitt Peak	Spacewatch	·	1.7 km	MPC · JPL
407964	2012 DX_{23}	—	March 26, 2007	Kitt Peak	Spacewatch	EOS	2.0 km	MPC · JPL
407965	2012 DH_{24}	—	September 30, 2009	Mount Lemmon	Mount Lemmon Survey	·	3.1 km	MPC · JPL
407966	2012 DO_{25}	—	March 5, 2008	Mount Lemmon	Mount Lemmon Survey	·	1.3 km	MPC · JPL
407967	2012 DT_{29}	—	March 18, 2004	Kitt Peak	Spacewatch	EUN	1.1 km	MPC · JPL
407968	2012 DJ_{33}	—	February 21, 2012	Kitt Peak	Spacewatch	EOS	2.0 km	MPC · JPL
407969	2012 DY_{35}	—	October 24, 2003	Socorro	LINEAR	·	4.2 km	MPC · JPL
407970	2012 DK_{37}	—	September 23, 2009	Mount Lemmon	Mount Lemmon Survey	EOS	2.2 km	MPC · JPL
407971	2012 DH_{39}	—	September 18, 2003	Kitt Peak	Spacewatch	VER	2.6 km	MPC · JPL
407972	2012 DP_{40}	—	September 26, 2009	Kitt Peak	Spacewatch	·	2.3 km	MPC · JPL
407973	2012 DV_{40}	—	January 17, 2007	Kitt Peak	Spacewatch	AGN	1.2 km	MPC · JPL
407974	2012 DO_{43}	—	March 5, 2006	Kitt Peak	Spacewatch	·	3.0 km	MPC · JPL
407975	2012 DS_{43}	—	August 29, 2009	Kitt Peak	Spacewatch	·	2.2 km	MPC · JPL
407976	2012 DB_{45}	—	August 15, 2009	Kitt Peak	Spacewatch	·	3.5 km	MPC · JPL
407977	2012 DV_{47}	—	October 25, 2005	Mount Lemmon	Mount Lemmon Survey	KOR	1.2 km	MPC · JPL
407978	2012 DW_{47}	—	March 10, 2007	Mount Lemmon	Mount Lemmon Survey	·	2.1 km	MPC · JPL
407979	2012 DW_{48}	—	November 16, 2006	Kitt Peak	Spacewatch	·	1.6 km	MPC · JPL
407980	2012 DT_{49}	—	October 30, 2009	Mount Lemmon	Mount Lemmon Survey	EOS	2.4 km	MPC · JPL
407981	2012 DT_{52}	—	October 1, 1995	Kitt Peak	Spacewatch	AGN	1.4 km	MPC · JPL
407982	2012 DV_{53}	—	September 21, 2008	Catalina	CSS	CYB	4.6 km	MPC · JPL
407983	2012 DL_{55}	—	October 18, 1995	Kitt Peak	Spacewatch	KOR	1.4 km	MPC · JPL
407984	2012 DB_{60}	—	August 18, 2009	Kitt Peak	Spacewatch	EOS	2.1 km	MPC · JPL
407985	2012 DG_{60}	—	April 25, 2007	Mount Lemmon	Mount Lemmon Survey	·	3.1 km	MPC · JPL
407986	2012 DA_{65}	—	December 30, 2005	Kitt Peak	Spacewatch	·	2.4 km	MPC · JPL
407987	2012 DH_{65}	—	March 26, 2003	Kitt Peak	Spacewatch	·	2.2 km	MPC · JPL
407988	2012 DH_{70}	—	November 16, 2010	Mount Lemmon	Mount Lemmon Survey	·	2.5 km	MPC · JPL
407989	2012 DO_{70}	—	November 17, 2006	Kitt Peak	Spacewatch	·	1.9 km	MPC · JPL
407990	2012 DW_{70}	—	April 20, 2007	Kitt Peak	Spacewatch	·	2.6 km	MPC · JPL
407991	2012 DU_{71}	—	December 2, 2005	Kitt Peak	Spacewatch	EOS	2.7 km	MPC · JPL
407992	2012 DS_{72}	—	February 25, 2012	Mount Lemmon	Mount Lemmon Survey	·	1.4 km	MPC · JPL
407993	2012 DA_{75}	—	February 25, 2007	Mount Lemmon	Mount Lemmon Survey	·	1.7 km	MPC · JPL
407994	2012 DZ_{76}	—	January 6, 2006	Kitt Peak	Spacewatch	·	2.8 km	MPC · JPL
407995	2012 DX_{77}	—	March 2, 2006	Catalina	CSS	·	5.0 km	MPC · JPL
407996	2012 DG_{78}	—	October 10, 2010	Kitt Peak	Spacewatch	·	2.6 km	MPC · JPL
407997	2012 DS_{78}	—	September 15, 2010	Mount Lemmon	Mount Lemmon Survey	·	1.6 km	MPC · JPL
407998	2012 DK_{80}	—	August 20, 2009	Kitt Peak	Spacewatch	EOS	1.9 km	MPC · JPL
407999	2012 DP_{82}	—	February 25, 2006	Mount Lemmon	Mount Lemmon Survey	·	3.1 km	MPC · JPL
408000	2012 DJ_{83}	—	April 9, 2003	Kitt Peak	Spacewatch	·	2.1 km	MPC · JPL

back to top

== Meaning of names ==
As minor planet discoveries are confirmed, they are given a permanent number by the IAU's Minor Planet Center (MPC), and the discoverers can then submit names for them, following the IAU's naming conventions. The list below concerns those minor planets in the specified number-range that have received names, and explains the meanings of those names.

Official naming citations of newly named small Solar System bodies are approved and published in a bulletin by IAU's Working Group for Small Bodies Nomenclature (WGSBN). Before May 2021, citations were published in MPC's Minor Planet Circulars for many decades. Recent citations can also be found on the JPL Small-Body Database (SBDB). Until his death in 2016, German astronomer Lutz D. Schmadel compiled these citations into the Dictionary of Minor Planet Names (DMP) and regularly updated the collection.

Based on Paul Herget's The Names of the Minor Planets, Schmadel also researched the unclear origin of numerous asteroids, most of which had been named prior to World War II. This article incorporates text from this source, which is in the public domain: SBDB New namings may only be added to this list below after official publication as the preannouncement of names is condemned. The WGSBN publishes a comprehensive guideline for the naming rules of non-cometary small Solar System bodies.

Named minor planet	Provisional	This minor planet was named for...	Ref · Catalog
407016 Danielerdag	2009 SZ_{21}	Daniel Erdag (1999–2017) loved astronomy, chemistry and sports. He was a member of the Lomonosov Tournaments in astronomy, chemistry, geography and global studies.	JPL · 407016
407041 Olganevskaya	2009 SQ_{99}	Olga Nevskaya, discoverer’s wife	IAU · 407041
407243 Krapivin	2009 WQ_{100}	Vladislav Krapivin (1938-2020) is a Russian writer and poet who has created much fiction about space and parallel worlds	JPL · 407243
