= Artyom Novichonok =

Russian astronomer

Minor planets discovered: 20
see § List of discovered minor planets

Artyom Olegovich Novichonok (Russian: Артём Олегович Новичонок; born 27 March 1988 in Kondopoga, Soviet Union (now Russia) is a Russian astronomer. Since 2009, the Minor Planet Center credits him with several minor planets, co-discovered in collaboration with astronomers Dmitry Chestnov, Vladimir Gerke and Leonid Elenin at the American Tzec Maun Observatory (H10) in Mayhill, New Mexico, and the Russian Ka-Dar Observatory (C32), TAU Station, in Nizhny Arkhyz, respectively.

He also discovered the periodic comet P/2011 R3 (Novichonok) in 2011, and he was part of the group that discovered the hyperbolic Comet ISON in September 2012, with Vitaly Nevsky at Kondopoga, Russia.

== Discoveries ==
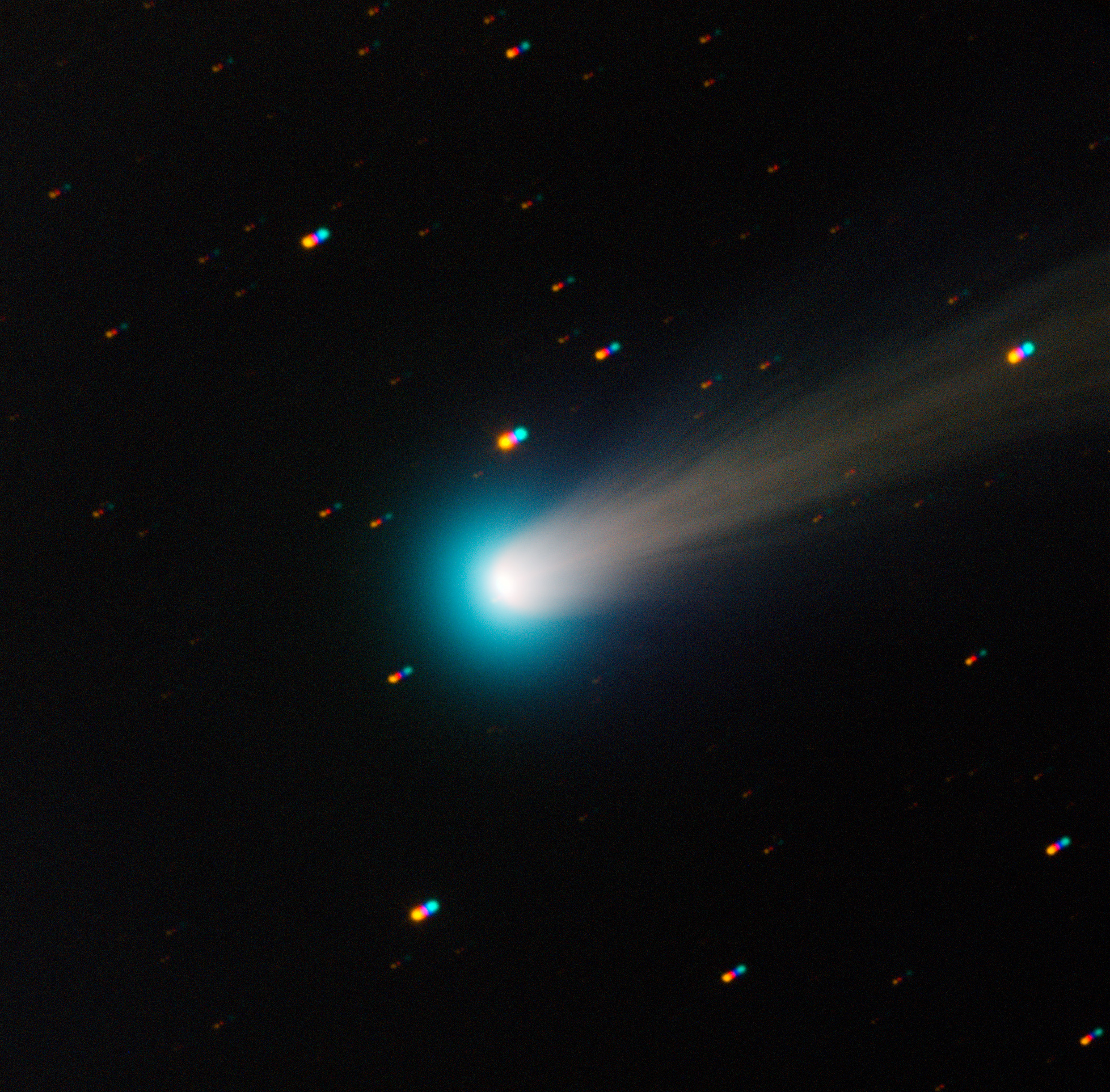
Comet ISON viewed by TRAPPIST in 2013

=== Comets ===
Together with Vitali Neveski, he discovered the comets:

- C/2012 S1 (ISON), a hyperbolic comet
- 408P/Novichonok–Gerke, formerly known as P/2011 R3, a Jupiter-family comet

=== List of discovered minor planets ===
228165 Mezentsev	26 September 2009	list^{[A]}
231649 Korotkiy	17 November 2009	list^{[A]}
(264156) 2009 WV_{5}	17 November 2009	list^{[A]}
(269568) 2009 WS_{105}	25 November 2009	list^{[A]}
274981 Petrsu	12 October 2009	list^{[A]}
(279340) 2009 YM_{6}	17 December 2009	list^{[A]}
(296747) 2009 UB_{1}	17 October 2009	list^{[A]}
(296818) 2009 WW_{5}	17 November 2009	list^{[A]}
(328734) 2009 UA_{1}	17 October 2009	list^{[A]}
(331056) 2009 WX	17 November 2009	list^{[A]}
(359847) 2011 UK_{352}	28 September 2011	list^{[B]}
(369400) 2009 WS_{7}	18 November 2009	list^{[A]}

(369485) 2010 UP_{6}	16 October 2010	list^{[C]}
(379283) 2009 VF_{1}	9 November 2009	list^{[A]}
(407154) 2009 UH_{2}	18 October 2009	list^{[A]}
(407228) 2009 WY_{10}	20 November 2009	list^{[A]}
(407231) 2009 WA_{25}	21 November 2012	list^{[A]}
(441872) 2010 AC_{40}	9 January 2010	list^{[A]}
(457939) 2009 VG_{1}	9 November 2009	list^{[A]}
(465786) 2010 AU_{60}	11 January 2010	list^{[A]}
Co-discovery made with:^{A} D. Chestnov^{B} V. Gerke^{C} L. Elenin

== See also ==
- List of minor planet discoverers § A. Novichonok
