= List of minor planets: 470001–471000 =

The following is a partial list of minor planets, running from minor-planet number 470001 through 471000, inclusive. The primary data for this and other partial lists is based on JPL's "Small-Body Orbital Elements" and data available from the Minor Planet Center. Critical list information is also provided by the MPC, unless otherwise specified from Lowell Observatory. A detailed description of the table's columns and additional sources are given on the main page including a complete list of every page in this series, and a statistical break-up on the dynamical classification of minor planets.

Also see the summary list of all named bodies in numerical and alphabetical order, and the corresponding naming citations for the number range of this particular list. New namings may only be added to this list after official publication, as the preannouncement of names is condemned by the Working Group for Small Bodies Nomenclature of the International Astronomical Union.

Near-Earth obj.	MBA (inner)	MBA (outer)	Centaur
Mars-crosser	MBA (middle)	Jupiter trojan	Trans-Neptunian obj.
Unclassified

== 470001–470100 ==
Designation			Discovery			Properties		Ref
Permanent	Provisional	Named after	Date	Site	Discoverer(s)	Category	Diam.	Ref
470001	2006 KW_{119}	—	December 19, 2004	Mount Lemmon	Mount Lemmon Survey	·	2.6 km	MPC · JPL
470002	2006 KW_{137}	—	May 25, 2006	Mauna Kea	P. A. Wiegert	·	1.9 km	MPC · JPL
470003	2006 LK_{3}	—	June 4, 2006	Kitt Peak	Spacewatch	·	2.1 km	MPC · JPL
470004	2006 MJ_{10}	—	June 22, 2006	Anderson Mesa	LONEOS	APO	660 m	MPC · JPL
470005	2006 OD_{21}	—	July 21, 2006	Mount Lemmon	Mount Lemmon Survey	·	2.1 km	MPC · JPL
470006	2006 OG_{21}	—	July 21, 2006	Mount Lemmon	Mount Lemmon Survey	·	530 m	MPC · JPL
470007	2006 OQ_{21}	—	July 21, 2006	Mount Lemmon	Mount Lemmon Survey	·	770 m	MPC · JPL
470008	2006 QP_{70}	—	August 21, 2006	Kitt Peak	Spacewatch	·	1.7 km	MPC · JPL
470009	2006 QS_{110}	—	August 27, 2006	Kitt Peak	Spacewatch	·	2.5 km	MPC · JPL
470010	2006 QV_{130}	—	August 20, 2006	Palomar	NEAT	·	590 m	MPC · JPL
470011	2006 QT_{141}	—	March 21, 2002	Kitt Peak	Spacewatch	·	650 m	MPC · JPL
470012	2006 QD_{144}	—	August 31, 2006	Marly	Observatoire Naef	·	2.4 km	MPC · JPL
470013	2006 QU_{158}	—	August 19, 2006	Kitt Peak	Spacewatch	·	580 m	MPC · JPL
470014	2006 QB_{183}	—	August 19, 2006	Kitt Peak	Spacewatch	·	1.7 km	MPC · JPL
470015	2006 RO_{7}	—	September 12, 2006	Catalina	CSS	·	2.2 km	MPC · JPL
470016	2006 RQ_{7}	—	August 19, 2006	Kitt Peak	Spacewatch	·	630 m	MPC · JPL
470017	2006 RH_{46}	—	September 14, 2006	Kitt Peak	Spacewatch	EOS	1.7 km	MPC · JPL
470018	2006 RK_{46}	—	September 14, 2006	Kitt Peak	Spacewatch	·	2.2 km	MPC · JPL
470019	2006 RS_{52}	—	September 14, 2006	Kitt Peak	Spacewatch	·	2.5 km	MPC · JPL
470020	2006 RE_{62}	—	August 29, 2006	Catalina	CSS	·	650 m	MPC · JPL
470021	2006 RL_{63}	—	August 29, 2006	Kitt Peak	Spacewatch	·	2.8 km	MPC · JPL
470022	2006 RR_{72}	—	September 15, 2006	Kitt Peak	Spacewatch	·	730 m	MPC · JPL
470023	2006 RM_{73}	—	September 15, 2006	Kitt Peak	Spacewatch	·	1.7 km	MPC · JPL
470024	2006 RK_{80}	—	September 15, 2006	Kitt Peak	Spacewatch	·	1.3 km	MPC · JPL
470025	2006 RQ_{80}	—	September 15, 2006	Kitt Peak	Spacewatch	·	1.8 km	MPC · JPL
470026	2006 RD_{102}	—	September 15, 2006	Kitt Peak	Spacewatch	EMA	3.0 km	MPC · JPL
470027	2006 RC_{103}	—	September 11, 2006	Apache Point	A. C. Becker, Puckett, A. W., Kubica, J.	cubewano (hot)	300 km	MPC · JPL
470028	2006 SB_{4}	—	September 16, 2006	Catalina	CSS	·	1.8 km	MPC · JPL
470029	2006 SG_{4}	—	September 16, 2006	Catalina	CSS	·	760 m	MPC · JPL
470030	2006 SJ_{7}	—	September 14, 2006	Kitt Peak	Spacewatch	·	620 m	MPC · JPL
470031	2006 SX_{10}	—	September 16, 2006	Kitt Peak	Spacewatch	·	3.9 km	MPC · JPL
470032	2006 ST_{13}	—	September 17, 2006	Socorro	LINEAR	·	930 m	MPC · JPL
470033	2006 SB_{16}	—	September 17, 2006	Catalina	CSS	·	2.1 km	MPC · JPL
470034	2006 SL_{17}	—	September 17, 2006	Kitt Peak	Spacewatch	·	2.6 km	MPC · JPL
470035	2006 SA_{33}	—	September 17, 2006	Kitt Peak	Spacewatch	·	2.3 km	MPC · JPL
470036	2006 SB_{36}	—	August 28, 2006	Anderson Mesa	LONEOS	·	660 m	MPC · JPL
470037	2006 SB_{58}	—	September 18, 2006	Kitt Peak	Spacewatch	EOS	1.6 km	MPC · JPL
470038	2006 SF_{62}	—	December 1, 2003	Kitt Peak	Spacewatch	·	740 m	MPC · JPL
470039	2006 SG_{79}	—	September 17, 2006	Kitt Peak	Spacewatch	·	1.8 km	MPC · JPL
470040	2006 SG_{95}	—	September 18, 2006	Kitt Peak	Spacewatch	EOS	1.6 km	MPC · JPL
470041	2006 SC_{97}	—	September 18, 2006	Kitt Peak	Spacewatch	·	630 m	MPC · JPL
470042	2006 SJ_{106}	—	September 19, 2006	Kitt Peak	Spacewatch	·	2.1 km	MPC · JPL
470043	2006 SC_{111}	—	September 21, 2006	Anderson Mesa	LONEOS	·	650 m	MPC · JPL
470044	2006 SP_{128}	—	September 17, 2006	Kitt Peak	Spacewatch	·	2.5 km	MPC · JPL
470045	2006 SX_{130}	—	September 24, 2006	Calvin-Rehoboth	L. A. Molnar	·	2.2 km	MPC · JPL
470046	2006 SL_{132}	—	September 16, 2006	Catalina	CSS	·	640 m	MPC · JPL
470047	2006 SR_{165}	—	July 21, 2006	Mount Lemmon	Mount Lemmon Survey	·	650 m	MPC · JPL
470048	2006 SN_{169}	—	September 17, 2006	Catalina	CSS	·	610 m	MPC · JPL
470049	2006 SZ_{169}	—	September 25, 2006	Kitt Peak	Spacewatch	EOS	1.3 km	MPC · JPL
470050	2006 SY_{181}	—	September 25, 2006	Anderson Mesa	LONEOS	·	670 m	MPC · JPL
470051	2006 SS_{183}	—	September 25, 2006	Mount Lemmon	Mount Lemmon Survey	·	2.3 km	MPC · JPL
470052	2006 SH_{186}	—	September 25, 2006	Kitt Peak	Spacewatch	EOS	1.6 km	MPC · JPL
470053	2006 SP_{195}	—	March 17, 2004	Kitt Peak	Spacewatch	·	1.8 km	MPC · JPL
470054	2006 SX_{203}	—	September 25, 2006	Kitt Peak	Spacewatch	KOR	1.3 km	MPC · JPL
470055	2006 SJ_{207}	—	September 25, 2006	Kitt Peak	Spacewatch	·	760 m	MPC · JPL
470056	2006 SG_{209}	—	July 21, 2006	Mount Lemmon	Mount Lemmon Survey	·	680 m	MPC · JPL
470057	2006 SD_{214}	—	September 16, 2006	Kitt Peak	Spacewatch	·	1.5 km	MPC · JPL
470058	2006 SX_{214}	—	July 21, 2006	Mount Lemmon	Mount Lemmon Survey	·	670 m	MPC · JPL
470059	2006 SP_{217}	—	September 28, 2006	Kitt Peak	Spacewatch	H	490 m	MPC · JPL
470060	2006 SL_{223}	—	September 18, 2006	Kitt Peak	Spacewatch	EOS	1.8 km	MPC · JPL
470061	2006 SX_{228}	—	September 18, 2006	Kitt Peak	Spacewatch	·	720 m	MPC · JPL
470062	2006 SK_{239}	—	September 18, 2006	Kitt Peak	Spacewatch	·	520 m	MPC · JPL
470063	2006 SH_{240}	—	September 18, 2006	Kitt Peak	Spacewatch	·	740 m	MPC · JPL
470064	2006 ST_{241}	—	September 26, 2006	Mount Lemmon	Mount Lemmon Survey	TEL	1.2 km	MPC · JPL
470065	2006 SQ_{254}	—	September 14, 2006	Kitt Peak	Spacewatch	EOS	1.7 km	MPC · JPL
470066	2006 SB_{257}	—	September 19, 2006	Kitt Peak	Spacewatch	·	3.1 km	MPC · JPL
470067	2006 SH_{261}	—	September 26, 2006	Kitt Peak	Spacewatch	EOS	1.6 km	MPC · JPL
470068	2006 SQ_{273}	—	September 27, 2006	Socorro	LINEAR	·	760 m	MPC · JPL
470069	2006 ST_{278}	—	September 17, 2006	Catalina	CSS	·	910 m	MPC · JPL
470070	2006 SD_{281}	—	September 29, 2006	Anderson Mesa	LONEOS	·	780 m	MPC · JPL
470071	2006 SZ_{289}	—	September 27, 2006	Catalina	CSS	V	590 m	MPC · JPL
470072	2006 SP_{297}	—	September 25, 2006	Mount Lemmon	Mount Lemmon Survey	·	1.4 km	MPC · JPL
470073	2006 SM_{310}	—	September 17, 2006	Kitt Peak	Spacewatch	·	790 m	MPC · JPL
470074	2006 SK_{314}	—	September 17, 2006	Kitt Peak	Spacewatch	·	490 m	MPC · JPL
470075	2006 SS_{321}	—	September 27, 2006	Kitt Peak	Spacewatch	·	1.9 km	MPC · JPL
470076	2006 SQ_{327}	—	September 23, 2006	Kitt Peak	Spacewatch	·	2.0 km	MPC · JPL
470077	2006 SQ_{331}	—	September 19, 2006	Kitt Peak	Spacewatch	·	570 m	MPC · JPL
470078	2006 SH_{343}	—	September 28, 2006	Kitt Peak	Spacewatch	·	2.4 km	MPC · JPL
470079	2006 SP_{354}	—	September 30, 2006	Mount Lemmon	Mount Lemmon Survey	·	610 m	MPC · JPL
470080	2006 SU_{354}	—	September 30, 2006	Mount Lemmon	Mount Lemmon Survey	EOS	2.1 km	MPC · JPL
470081	2006 SM_{355}	—	September 30, 2006	Catalina	CSS	·	760 m	MPC · JPL
470082	2006 SY_{359}	—	September 18, 2006	Catalina	CSS	·	1.7 km	MPC · JPL
470083	2006 SG_{369}	—	September 16, 2006	Apache Point	A. C. Becker, Puckett, A. W., Kubica, J.	twotino	108 km	MPC · JPL
470084	2006 SH_{380}	—	September 27, 2006	Apache Point	A. C. Becker	EOS	1.6 km	MPC · JPL
470085	2006 SL_{380}	—	September 27, 2006	Apache Point	A. C. Becker	EOS	1.8 km	MPC · JPL
470086	2006 SH_{383}	—	September 29, 2006	Apache Point	A. C. Becker	EOS	1.4 km	MPC · JPL
470087	2006 SN_{388}	—	September 30, 2006	Apache Point	A. C. Becker	·	2.3 km	MPC · JPL
470088	2006 SZ_{388}	—	September 30, 2006	Apache Point	A. C. Becker	·	1.9 km	MPC · JPL
470089	2006 SU_{397}	—	September 26, 2006	Mount Lemmon	Mount Lemmon Survey	·	1.8 km	MPC · JPL
470090	2006 SN_{402}	—	September 25, 2006	Mount Lemmon	Mount Lemmon Survey	·	3.4 km	MPC · JPL
470091	2006 SC_{403}	—	September 26, 2006	Mount Lemmon	Mount Lemmon Survey	·	1.8 km	MPC · JPL
470092	2006 SM_{406}	—	September 17, 2006	Kitt Peak	Spacewatch	·	580 m	MPC · JPL
470093	2006 SR_{406}	—	September 18, 2006	Anderson Mesa	LONEOS	·	540 m	MPC · JPL
470094	2006 TY_{15}	—	September 17, 2006	Kitt Peak	Spacewatch	EOS	1.7 km	MPC · JPL
470095	2006 TU_{16}	—	September 25, 2006	Mount Lemmon	Mount Lemmon Survey	THM	2.5 km	MPC · JPL
470096	2006 TR_{19}	—	September 28, 2006	Mount Lemmon	Mount Lemmon Survey	·	1.8 km	MPC · JPL
470097	2006 TF_{25}	—	October 12, 2006	Kitt Peak	Spacewatch	·	2.8 km	MPC · JPL
470098	2006 TL_{30}	—	October 12, 2006	Kitt Peak	Spacewatch	·	2.0 km	MPC · JPL
470099	2006 TT_{33}	—	September 26, 2006	Mount Lemmon	Mount Lemmon Survey	·	2.4 km	MPC · JPL
470100	2006 TU_{36}	—	September 30, 2006	Mount Lemmon	Mount Lemmon Survey	·	2.9 km	MPC · JPL

== 470101–470200 ==
back to top

Designation			Discovery			Properties		Ref
Permanent	Provisional	Named after	Date	Site	Discoverer(s)	Category	Diam.	Ref
470101	2006 TS_{52}	—	October 12, 2006	Kitt Peak	Spacewatch	·	650 m	MPC · JPL
470102	2006 TO_{53}	—	October 12, 2006	Kitt Peak	Spacewatch	·	3.7 km	MPC · JPL
470103	2006 TH_{56}	—	October 13, 2006	Kitt Peak	Spacewatch	·	680 m	MPC · JPL
470104	2006 TM_{56}	—	October 4, 2006	Mount Lemmon	Mount Lemmon Survey	H	460 m	MPC · JPL
470105	2006 TY_{59}	—	October 13, 2006	Kitt Peak	Spacewatch	V	620 m	MPC · JPL
470106	2006 TD_{68}	—	October 11, 2006	Palomar	NEAT	·	800 m	MPC · JPL
470107	2006 TG_{81}	—	October 4, 2006	Mount Lemmon	Mount Lemmon Survey	·	1.8 km	MPC · JPL
470108	2006 TU_{82}	—	October 4, 2006	Mount Lemmon	Mount Lemmon Survey	·	2.7 km	MPC · JPL
470109	2006 TE_{85}	—	October 4, 2006	Mount Lemmon	Mount Lemmon Survey	·	2.3 km	MPC · JPL
470110	2006 TQ_{86}	—	October 13, 2006	Kitt Peak	Spacewatch	·	740 m	MPC · JPL
470111	2006 TQ_{90}	—	October 4, 2006	Mount Lemmon	Mount Lemmon Survey	·	2.6 km	MPC · JPL
470112	2006 TF_{103}	—	October 2, 2006	Mount Lemmon	Mount Lemmon Survey	·	740 m	MPC · JPL
470113	2006 TT_{103}	—	October 15, 2006	Kitt Peak	Spacewatch	·	630 m	MPC · JPL
470114	2006 TM_{109}	—	October 4, 2006	Mount Lemmon	Mount Lemmon Survey	·	2.5 km	MPC · JPL
470115	2006 TH_{117}	—	October 3, 2006	Apache Point	A. C. Becker	·	1.9 km	MPC · JPL
470116	2006 TM_{119}	—	October 11, 2006	Apache Point	A. C. Becker	·	2.3 km	MPC · JPL
470117	2006 TW_{122}	—	October 12, 2006	Kitt Peak	Spacewatch	·	2.0 km	MPC · JPL
470118	2006 TK_{125}	—	October 12, 2006	Kitt Peak	Spacewatch	·	2.9 km	MPC · JPL
470119	2006 TY_{125}	—	October 13, 2006	Kitt Peak	Spacewatch	·	2.9 km	MPC · JPL
470120	2006 TB_{126}	—	October 4, 2006	Mount Lemmon	Mount Lemmon Survey	VER	2.9 km	MPC · JPL
470121	2006 TL_{129}	—	October 13, 2006	Kitt Peak	Spacewatch	·	2.2 km	MPC · JPL
470122	2006 TV_{129}	—	October 2, 2006	Mount Lemmon	Mount Lemmon Survey	·	2.4 km	MPC · JPL
470123	2006 UR_{2}	—	October 16, 2006	Mount Lemmon	Mount Lemmon Survey	H	380 m	MPC · JPL
470124	2006 UB_{7}	—	October 2, 2006	Mount Lemmon	Mount Lemmon Survey	·	2.6 km	MPC · JPL
470125	2006 UW_{15}	—	October 17, 2006	Mount Lemmon	Mount Lemmon Survey	·	2.3 km	MPC · JPL
470126	2006 UQ_{16}	—	October 17, 2006	Mount Lemmon	Mount Lemmon Survey	·	730 m	MPC · JPL
470127	2006 UW_{21}	—	September 18, 2006	Kitt Peak	Spacewatch	·	610 m	MPC · JPL
470128	2006 UE_{24}	—	October 16, 2006	Kitt Peak	Spacewatch	·	620 m	MPC · JPL
470129	2006 UA_{27}	—	October 4, 2006	Mount Lemmon	Mount Lemmon Survey	·	1.6 km	MPC · JPL
470130	2006 UN_{28}	—	October 16, 2006	Kitt Peak	Spacewatch	KOR	1.3 km	MPC · JPL
470131	2006 UW_{31}	—	October 16, 2006	Kitt Peak	Spacewatch	·	2.4 km	MPC · JPL
470132	2006 UV_{33}	—	October 16, 2006	Kitt Peak	Spacewatch	·	590 m	MPC · JPL
470133	2006 UX_{35}	—	September 30, 2006	Mount Lemmon	Mount Lemmon Survey	·	2.2 km	MPC · JPL
470134	2006 UH_{43}	—	October 16, 2006	Kitt Peak	Spacewatch	·	1.5 km	MPC · JPL
470135	2006 UU_{44}	—	October 16, 2006	Kitt Peak	Spacewatch	·	1.9 km	MPC · JPL
470136	2006 UB_{46}	—	October 16, 2006	Kitt Peak	Spacewatch	·	1.1 km	MPC · JPL
470137	2006 UF_{51}	—	September 19, 2006	Kitt Peak	Spacewatch	·	550 m	MPC · JPL
470138	2006 UD_{53}	—	October 17, 2006	Mount Lemmon	Mount Lemmon Survey	·	1.9 km	MPC · JPL
470139	2006 UH_{57}	—	October 18, 2006	Kitt Peak	Spacewatch	EOS	1.6 km	MPC · JPL
470140	2006 UP_{57}	—	October 2, 2006	Mount Lemmon	Mount Lemmon Survey	·	620 m	MPC · JPL
470141	2006 UT_{60}	—	October 19, 2006	Catalina	CSS	·	3.0 km	MPC · JPL
470142	2006 UT_{69}	—	October 16, 2006	Catalina	CSS	·	640 m	MPC · JPL
470143	2006 UJ_{71}	—	September 28, 2006	Mount Lemmon	Mount Lemmon Survey	·	2.7 km	MPC · JPL
470144	2006 UV_{72}	—	September 26, 2006	Kitt Peak	Spacewatch	·	2.4 km	MPC · JPL
470145	2006 UE_{73}	—	September 30, 2006	Kitt Peak	Spacewatch	EOS	1.6 km	MPC · JPL
470146	2006 UG_{74}	—	September 25, 2006	Kitt Peak	Spacewatch	·	1.9 km	MPC · JPL
470147	2006 UN_{78}	—	September 25, 2006	Kitt Peak	Spacewatch	·	1.9 km	MPC · JPL
470148	2006 UK_{86}	—	October 17, 2006	Mount Lemmon	Mount Lemmon Survey	·	2.6 km	MPC · JPL
470149	2006 UN_{88}	—	October 17, 2006	Kitt Peak	Spacewatch	·	3.2 km	MPC · JPL
470150	2006 UP_{89}	—	October 17, 2006	Kitt Peak	Spacewatch	·	2.3 km	MPC · JPL
470151	2006 UP_{94}	—	October 3, 2006	Mount Lemmon	Mount Lemmon Survey	·	2.4 km	MPC · JPL
470152	2006 UL_{96}	—	October 18, 2006	Kitt Peak	Spacewatch	·	2.2 km	MPC · JPL
470153	2006 US_{97}	—	October 3, 2006	Mount Lemmon	Mount Lemmon Survey	·	520 m	MPC · JPL
470154	2006 UO_{99}	—	October 3, 2006	Mount Lemmon	Mount Lemmon Survey	·	2.0 km	MPC · JPL
470155	2006 UF_{103}	—	September 25, 2006	Mount Lemmon	Mount Lemmon Survey	·	710 m	MPC · JPL
470156	2006 UV_{112}	—	September 18, 2006	Kitt Peak	Spacewatch	·	610 m	MPC · JPL
470157	2006 UG_{114}	—	September 24, 2006	Kitt Peak	Spacewatch	·	540 m	MPC · JPL
470158	2006 UD_{116}	—	October 19, 2006	Kitt Peak	Spacewatch	·	1.9 km	MPC · JPL
470159	2006 UG_{125}	—	October 19, 2006	Kitt Peak	Spacewatch	VER	2.8 km	MPC · JPL
470160	2006 UV_{126}	—	October 11, 2006	Kitt Peak	Spacewatch	·	570 m	MPC · JPL
470161	2006 UR_{131}	—	October 19, 2006	Kitt Peak	Spacewatch	·	680 m	MPC · JPL
470162	2006 UU_{142}	—	October 4, 2006	Mount Lemmon	Mount Lemmon Survey	·	2.5 km	MPC · JPL
470163	2006 UP_{149}	—	September 15, 2006	Kitt Peak	Spacewatch	·	3.2 km	MPC · JPL
470164	2006 UQ_{151}	—	October 13, 2006	Kitt Peak	Spacewatch	·	810 m	MPC · JPL
470165	2006 UE_{152}	—	October 20, 2006	Mount Lemmon	Mount Lemmon Survey	·	2.8 km	MPC · JPL
470166	2006 UH_{153}	—	October 21, 2006	Kitt Peak	Spacewatch	·	1.8 km	MPC · JPL
470167	2006 UP_{179}	—	October 16, 2006	Catalina	CSS	·	720 m	MPC · JPL
470168	2006 UO_{194}	—	October 20, 2006	Kitt Peak	Spacewatch	·	2.6 km	MPC · JPL
470169	2006 UK_{196}	—	October 20, 2006	Kitt Peak	Spacewatch	·	2.0 km	MPC · JPL
470170	2006 UO_{197}	—	September 27, 2006	Mount Lemmon	Mount Lemmon Survey	·	1.9 km	MPC · JPL
470171	2006 UG_{201}	—	October 21, 2006	Kitt Peak	Spacewatch	·	1.9 km	MPC · JPL
470172	2006 UP_{219}	—	September 18, 2006	Catalina	CSS	(2076)	690 m	MPC · JPL
470173	2006 UM_{237}	—	September 26, 2006	Mount Lemmon	Mount Lemmon Survey	·	2.0 km	MPC · JPL
470174	2006 UH_{239}	—	October 13, 2006	Kitt Peak	Spacewatch	H	550 m	MPC · JPL
470175	2006 UT_{241}	—	October 27, 2006	Kitt Peak	Spacewatch	·	1.6 km	MPC · JPL
470176	2006 UR_{258}	—	October 28, 2006	Mount Lemmon	Mount Lemmon Survey	·	2.6 km	MPC · JPL
470177	2006 UH_{277}	—	April 28, 2004	Kitt Peak	Spacewatch	·	3.0 km	MPC · JPL
470178	2006 UC_{282}	—	October 12, 2006	Kitt Peak	Spacewatch	·	1.7 km	MPC · JPL
470179	2006 UA_{284}	—	September 26, 2006	Mount Lemmon	Mount Lemmon Survey	EOS	1.6 km	MPC · JPL
470180	2006 UH_{332}	—	October 4, 2006	Mount Lemmon	Mount Lemmon Survey	·	1.9 km	MPC · JPL
470181	2006 UX_{335}	—	October 19, 2006	Mount Lemmon	Mount Lemmon Survey	fast	1.6 km	MPC · JPL
470182	2006 UC_{350}	—	October 16, 2006	Kitt Peak	Spacewatch	·	1.8 km	MPC · JPL
470183	2006 UA_{359}	—	October 20, 2006	Kitt Peak	Spacewatch	·	2.2 km	MPC · JPL
470184	2006 UT_{359}	—	October 21, 2006	Kitt Peak	Spacewatch	·	570 m	MPC · JPL
470185	2006 VT_{7}	—	November 10, 2006	Kitt Peak	Spacewatch	V	470 m	MPC · JPL
470186	2006 VJ_{12}	—	November 11, 2006	Mount Lemmon	Mount Lemmon Survey	·	650 m	MPC · JPL
470187	2006 VY_{12}	—	November 13, 2006	Catalina	CSS	H	490 m	MPC · JPL
470188	2006 VF_{15}	—	October 21, 2006	Kitt Peak	Spacewatch	·	560 m	MPC · JPL
470189	2006 VM_{16}	—	November 9, 2006	Kitt Peak	Spacewatch	·	2.6 km	MPC · JPL
470190	2006 VJ_{23}	—	October 27, 2006	Mount Lemmon	Mount Lemmon Survey	·	2.0 km	MPC · JPL
470191	2006 VB_{28}	—	September 27, 2006	Mount Lemmon	Mount Lemmon Survey	(2076)	690 m	MPC · JPL
470192	2006 VW_{32}	—	October 12, 2006	Kitt Peak	Spacewatch	·	680 m	MPC · JPL
470193	2006 VF_{35}	—	November 11, 2006	Mount Lemmon	Mount Lemmon Survey	·	2.9 km	MPC · JPL
470194	2006 VH_{42}	—	October 17, 2006	Mount Lemmon	Mount Lemmon Survey	·	2.2 km	MPC · JPL
470195	2006 VB_{44}	—	September 27, 2006	Mount Lemmon	Mount Lemmon Survey	·	2.9 km	MPC · JPL
470196	2006 VV_{44}	—	November 2, 2006	Catalina	CSS	H	490 m	MPC · JPL
470197	2006 VT_{48}	—	October 20, 2006	Mount Lemmon	Mount Lemmon Survey	·	3.7 km	MPC · JPL
470198	2006 VB_{51}	—	November 10, 2006	Kitt Peak	Spacewatch	·	3.6 km	MPC · JPL
470199	2006 VZ_{54}	—	November 11, 2006	Kitt Peak	Spacewatch	·	2.4 km	MPC · JPL
470200	2006 VP_{55}	—	September 28, 2006	Mount Lemmon	Mount Lemmon Survey	·	2.5 km	MPC · JPL

== 470201–470300 ==
back to top

Designation			Discovery			Properties		Ref
Permanent	Provisional	Named after	Date	Site	Discoverer(s)	Category	Diam.	Ref
470201	2006 VF_{57}	—	November 11, 2006	Kitt Peak	Spacewatch	·	700 m	MPC · JPL
470202	2006 VD_{60}	—	September 27, 2006	Mount Lemmon	Mount Lemmon Survey	·	3.0 km	MPC · JPL
470203	2006 VF_{72}	—	October 17, 2006	Mount Lemmon	Mount Lemmon Survey	·	4.3 km	MPC · JPL
470204	2006 VV_{78}	—	October 23, 2006	Mount Lemmon	Mount Lemmon Survey	·	1.9 km	MPC · JPL
470205	2006 VZ_{110}	—	November 13, 2006	Kitt Peak	Spacewatch	·	810 m	MPC · JPL
470206	2006 VQ_{112}	—	November 13, 2006	Kitt Peak	Spacewatch	·	770 m	MPC · JPL
470207	2006 VK_{119}	—	October 4, 2006	Mount Lemmon	Mount Lemmon Survey	·	690 m	MPC · JPL
470208	2006 VJ_{139}	—	September 28, 2006	Mount Lemmon	Mount Lemmon Survey	·	2.2 km	MPC · JPL
470209	2006 VG_{143}	—	November 14, 2006	Socorro	LINEAR	·	1.3 km	MPC · JPL
470210	2006 VW_{170}	—	November 1, 2006	Mount Lemmon	Mount Lemmon Survey	·	3.5 km	MPC · JPL
470211	2006 VE_{173}	—	November 11, 2006	Kitt Peak	Spacewatch	·	2.8 km	MPC · JPL
470212	2006 WM_{19}	—	November 17, 2006	Mount Lemmon	Mount Lemmon Survey	·	2.6 km	MPC · JPL
470213	2006 WH_{23}	—	November 17, 2006	Mount Lemmon	Mount Lemmon Survey	·	800 m	MPC · JPL
470214	2006 WF_{29}	—	November 22, 2006	Eskridge	Farpoint	·	2.4 km	MPC · JPL
470215	2006 WP_{29}	—	November 22, 2006	Siding Spring	SSS	·	950 m	MPC · JPL
470216	2006 WL_{30}	—	October 31, 2006	Kitt Peak	Spacewatch	·	3.3 km	MPC · JPL
470217	2006 WS_{31}	—	October 18, 2006	Kitt Peak	Spacewatch	·	2.4 km	MPC · JPL
470218	2006 WJ_{32}	—	November 16, 2006	Kitt Peak	Spacewatch	·	3.2 km	MPC · JPL
470219	2006 WZ_{39}	—	November 16, 2006	Kitt Peak	Spacewatch	V	480 m	MPC · JPL
470220	2006 WD_{49}	—	September 28, 2006	Mount Lemmon	Mount Lemmon Survey	·	3.9 km	MPC · JPL
470221	2006 WD_{85}	—	November 18, 2006	Kitt Peak	Spacewatch	·	1.9 km	MPC · JPL
470222	2006 WG_{88}	—	October 23, 2006	Mount Lemmon	Mount Lemmon Survey	·	2.3 km	MPC · JPL
470223	2006 WV_{97}	—	November 11, 2006	Kitt Peak	Spacewatch	·	2.6 km	MPC · JPL
470224	2006 WA_{98}	—	November 19, 2006	Kitt Peak	Spacewatch	·	3.3 km	MPC · JPL
470225	2006 WM_{98}	—	November 19, 2006	Kitt Peak	Spacewatch	·	4.0 km	MPC · JPL
470226	2006 WO_{100}	—	November 19, 2006	Socorro	LINEAR	·	2.9 km	MPC · JPL
470227	2006 WR_{100}	—	November 19, 2006	Socorro	LINEAR	·	2.4 km	MPC · JPL
470228	2006 WN_{105}	—	October 28, 2006	Mount Lemmon	Mount Lemmon Survey	HYG	2.2 km	MPC · JPL
470229	2006 WY_{108}	—	November 19, 2006	Kitt Peak	Spacewatch	·	2.6 km	MPC · JPL
470230	2006 WX_{119}	—	September 27, 2006	Mount Lemmon	Mount Lemmon Survey	·	670 m	MPC · JPL
470231	2006 WB_{129}	—	November 22, 2006	Catalina	CSS	·	2.0 km	MPC · JPL
470232	2006 WM_{130}	—	November 28, 2006	Socorro	LINEAR	H	510 m	MPC · JPL
470233	2006 WO_{156}	—	October 21, 2006	Mount Lemmon	Mount Lemmon Survey	·	3.8 km	MPC · JPL
470234	2006 WF_{157}	—	November 22, 2006	Catalina	CSS	·	2.7 km	MPC · JPL
470235	2006 WK_{170}	—	November 11, 2006	Kitt Peak	Spacewatch	·	640 m	MPC · JPL
470236	2006 WR_{172}	—	November 23, 2006	Kitt Peak	Spacewatch	·	2.7 km	MPC · JPL
470237	2006 WV_{172}	—	November 11, 2006	Kitt Peak	Spacewatch	·	2.8 km	MPC · JPL
470238	2006 WJ_{192}	—	October 31, 2006	Mount Lemmon	Mount Lemmon Survey	·	2.2 km	MPC · JPL
470239	2006 WE_{195}	—	November 29, 2006	Socorro	LINEAR	·	730 m	MPC · JPL
470240	2006 WK_{202}	—	November 23, 2006	Kitt Peak	Spacewatch	·	3.0 km	MPC · JPL
470241	2006 XS_{5}	—	October 23, 2006	Mount Lemmon	Mount Lemmon Survey	·	780 m	MPC · JPL
470242	2006 XD_{26}	—	December 1, 2006	Mount Lemmon	Mount Lemmon Survey	·	750 m	MPC · JPL
470243	2006 XM_{37}	—	November 18, 2006	Mount Lemmon	Mount Lemmon Survey	·	3.0 km	MPC · JPL
470244	2006 XQ_{44}	—	November 18, 2006	Kitt Peak	Spacewatch	·	2.9 km	MPC · JPL
470245	2006 XZ_{62}	—	December 15, 2006	Mount Lemmon	Mount Lemmon Survey	·	990 m	MPC · JPL
470246	2006 XE_{63}	—	November 16, 2006	Kitt Peak	Spacewatch	·	3.7 km	MPC · JPL
470247	2006 XA_{71}	—	August 30, 2005	Kitt Peak	Spacewatch	THM	2.1 km	MPC · JPL
470248	2006 XP_{71}	—	October 23, 2006	Mount Lemmon	Mount Lemmon Survey	·	3.7 km	MPC · JPL
470249	2006 XX_{71}	—	December 11, 2006	Kitt Peak	Spacewatch	·	700 m	MPC · JPL
470250	2006 XP_{72}	—	December 12, 2006	Kitt Peak	Spacewatch	·	920 m	MPC · JPL
470251	2006 YQ	—	November 24, 2006	Kitt Peak	Spacewatch	·	740 m	MPC · JPL
470252	2006 YJ_{7}	—	December 20, 2006	Palomar	NEAT	·	2.6 km	MPC · JPL
470253	2006 YW_{30}	—	December 21, 2006	Kitt Peak	Spacewatch	·	720 m	MPC · JPL
470254	2006 YW_{35}	—	December 21, 2006	Kitt Peak	Spacewatch	·	820 m	MPC · JPL
470255	2006 YN_{37}	—	November 1, 2006	Mount Lemmon	Mount Lemmon Survey	·	2.5 km	MPC · JPL
470256	2006 YP_{42}	—	December 23, 2006	Catalina	CSS	PHO	1.2 km	MPC · JPL
470257	2006 YQ_{54}	—	December 26, 2006	Kitt Peak	Spacewatch	H	490 m	MPC · JPL
470258	2006 YV_{55}	—	December 25, 2006	Catalina	CSS	·	860 m	MPC · JPL
470259	2007 AF_{7}	—	December 14, 2006	Kitt Peak	Spacewatch	H	530 m	MPC · JPL
470260	2007 AX_{10}	—	January 8, 2007	Mount Lemmon	Mount Lemmon Survey	·	1.2 km	MPC · JPL
470261	2007 AP_{16}	—	January 10, 2007	Mount Lemmon	Mount Lemmon Survey	H	670 m	MPC · JPL
470262	2007 AV_{30}	—	January 8, 2007	Mount Lemmon	Mount Lemmon Survey	·	3.6 km	MPC · JPL
470263	2007 BJ_{3}	—	January 9, 2007	Mount Lemmon	Mount Lemmon Survey	H	510 m	MPC · JPL
470264	2007 BL_{4}	—	December 26, 2006	Kitt Peak	Spacewatch	T_{j} (2.99)	3.5 km	MPC · JPL
470265	2007 BX_{7}	—	January 17, 2007	Catalina	CSS	H	700 m	MPC · JPL
470266	2007 BM_{23}	—	January 24, 2007	Mount Lemmon	Mount Lemmon Survey	·	1.2 km	MPC · JPL
470267	2007 BJ_{38}	—	January 24, 2007	Catalina	CSS	·	3.1 km	MPC · JPL
470268	2007 BR_{53}	—	January 9, 2007	Mount Lemmon	Mount Lemmon Survey	H	430 m	MPC · JPL
470269	2007 BP_{56}	—	November 16, 2006	Mount Lemmon	Mount Lemmon Survey	·	1.5 km	MPC · JPL
470270	2007 BL_{59}	—	November 16, 2006	Catalina	CSS	T_{j} (2.93)	4.4 km	MPC · JPL
470271	2007 BH_{61}	—	January 9, 2007	Mount Lemmon	Mount Lemmon Survey	H	580 m	MPC · JPL
470272	2007 BX_{75}	—	January 27, 2007	Kitt Peak	Spacewatch	·	2.3 km	MPC · JPL
470273	2007 BP_{76}	—	January 17, 2007	Kitt Peak	Spacewatch	·	1.2 km	MPC · JPL
470274	2007 CL_{38}	—	January 27, 2007	Mount Lemmon	Mount Lemmon Survey	·	2.5 km	MPC · JPL
470275	2007 CC_{48}	—	January 15, 2007	Catalina	CSS	·	3.5 km	MPC · JPL
470276	2007 CS_{52}	—	February 10, 2007	Catalina	CSS	H	520 m	MPC · JPL
470277	2007 CU_{53}	—	February 15, 2007	Palomar	NEAT	H	740 m	MPC · JPL
470278	2007 DO_{5}	—	November 15, 2006	Mount Lemmon	Mount Lemmon Survey	·	1.3 km	MPC · JPL
470279	2007 DX_{11}	—	January 17, 2007	Catalina	CSS	H	390 m	MPC · JPL
470280	2007 DF_{14}	—	February 8, 2007	Mount Lemmon	Mount Lemmon Survey	·	1.1 km	MPC · JPL
470281	2007 DB_{45}	—	February 19, 2007	Mount Lemmon	Mount Lemmon Survey	·	1.1 km	MPC · JPL
470282	2007 DN_{49}	—	December 21, 2006	Mount Lemmon	Mount Lemmon Survey	T_{j} (2.99)	3.2 km	MPC · JPL
470283	2007 DJ_{86}	—	February 22, 2007	Catalina	CSS	·	760 m	MPC · JPL
470284	2007 ED_{82}	—	March 11, 2007	Anderson Mesa	LONEOS	PHO	1.1 km	MPC · JPL
470285	2007 EB_{85}	—	March 12, 2007	Catalina	CSS	·	2.4 km	MPC · JPL
470286	2007 EQ_{87}	—	March 13, 2007	Mount Lemmon	Mount Lemmon Survey	JUN	920 m	MPC · JPL
470287	2007 EY_{91}	—	March 10, 2007	Kitt Peak	Spacewatch	·	990 m	MPC · JPL
470288	2007 EW_{134}	—	March 10, 2007	Palomar	NEAT	·	1.3 km	MPC · JPL
470289	2007 EM_{135}	—	March 10, 2007	Mount Lemmon	Mount Lemmon Survey	·	1.4 km	MPC · JPL
470290	2007 EF_{138}	—	January 27, 2007	Mount Lemmon	Mount Lemmon Survey	·	1.3 km	MPC · JPL
470291	2007 EX_{151}	—	February 26, 2007	Mount Lemmon	Mount Lemmon Survey	·	990 m	MPC · JPL
470292	2007 EZ_{151}	—	March 12, 2007	Mount Lemmon	Mount Lemmon Survey	NYS	1.1 km	MPC · JPL
470293	2007 EF_{224}	—	March 15, 2007	Kitt Peak	Spacewatch	·	1.3 km	MPC · JPL
470294	2007 FA_{38}	—	March 25, 2007	Catalina	CSS	·	1.8 km	MPC · JPL
470295	2007 GK	—	March 14, 2007	Kitt Peak	Spacewatch	·	1.6 km	MPC · JPL
470296	2007 GT_{9}	—	March 11, 2007	Catalina	CSS	·	1.9 km	MPC · JPL
470297	2007 GW_{18}	—	April 11, 2007	Kitt Peak	Spacewatch	·	1.1 km	MPC · JPL
470298	2007 GU_{37}	—	March 15, 2007	Mount Lemmon	Mount Lemmon Survey	·	1.4 km	MPC · JPL
470299	2007 GH_{46}	—	April 14, 2007	Kitt Peak	Spacewatch	·	870 m	MPC · JPL
470300	2007 GB_{49}	—	April 14, 2007	Kitt Peak	Spacewatch	·	1.3 km	MPC · JPL

== 470301–470400 ==
back to top

Designation			Discovery			Properties		Ref
Permanent	Provisional	Named after	Date	Site	Discoverer(s)	Category	Diam.	Ref
470301	2007 GU_{55}	—	April 15, 2007	Kitt Peak	Spacewatch	·	1.4 km	MPC · JPL
470302	2007 HR_{37}	—	April 20, 2007	Kitt Peak	Spacewatch	·	1.0 km	MPC · JPL
470303	2007 HX_{46}	—	April 20, 2007	Kitt Peak	Spacewatch	MRX	1.1 km	MPC · JPL
470304	2007 HW_{87}	—	April 25, 2007	Kitt Peak	Spacewatch	·	1.7 km	MPC · JPL
470305	2007 JK	—	April 25, 2007	Mount Lemmon	Mount Lemmon Survey	·	1.6 km	MPC · JPL
470306	2007 JE_{17}	—	May 7, 2007	Kitt Peak	Spacewatch	·	1.2 km	MPC · JPL
470307	2007 JB_{37}	—	May 10, 2007	Anderson Mesa	LONEOS	·	1.4 km	MPC · JPL
470308	2007 JH_{43}	—	May 10, 2007	Palomar Mountain	M. E. Schwamb, M. E. Brown, D. Rabinowitz	plutino	531 km	MPC · JPL
470309	2007 JK_{43}	—	May 10, 2007	Palomar Mountain	M. E. Schwamb, M. E. Brown, D. Rabinowitz	centaur	192 km	MPC · JPL
470310	2007 LB_{15}	—	June 13, 2007	Catalina	CSS	ATE · PHA	430 m	MPC · JPL
470311	2007 LF_{21}	—	May 11, 2007	Kitt Peak	Spacewatch	·	2.0 km	MPC · JPL
470312	2007 LL_{31}	—	April 26, 2007	Mount Lemmon	Mount Lemmon Survey	·	1.7 km	MPC · JPL
470313	2007 MA_{15}	—	June 16, 2007	Kitt Peak	Spacewatch	·	1.8 km	MPC · JPL
470314	2007 MU_{16}	—	April 25, 2007	Mount Lemmon	Mount Lemmon Survey	ADE	1.8 km	MPC · JPL
470315	2007 NY_{4}	—	June 9, 2007	Siding Spring	SSS	·	2.0 km	MPC · JPL
470316	2007 OC_{10}	—	July 22, 2007	Palomar Mountain	M. E. Schwamb, M. E. Brown	SDO	330 km	MPC · JPL
470317	2007 PJ_{21}	—	August 9, 2007	Socorro	LINEAR	·	1.8 km	MPC · JPL
470318	2007 PM_{23}	—	August 12, 2007	Socorro	LINEAR	·	2.0 km	MPC · JPL
470319	2007 PY_{43}	—	August 13, 2007	Socorro	LINEAR	EUN	1.3 km	MPC · JPL
470320	2007 PC_{46}	—	August 10, 2007	Kitt Peak	Spacewatch	·	1.9 km	MPC · JPL
470321	2007 PL_{47}	—	August 10, 2007	Kitt Peak	Spacewatch	HOF	2.2 km	MPC · JPL
470322	2007 PC_{50}	—	August 10, 2007	Kitt Peak	Spacewatch	·	1.6 km	MPC · JPL
470323	2007 PN_{50}	—	August 10, 2007	Kitt Peak	Spacewatch	·	1.6 km	MPC · JPL
470324 Debbanci	2007 QX_{3}	Debbanci	August 16, 2007	San Marcello	L. Tesi, G. Fagioli	·	2.2 km	MPC · JPL
470325	2007 QK_{7}	—	August 21, 2007	Anderson Mesa	LONEOS	·	2.1 km	MPC · JPL
470326	2007 RB_{5}	—	September 1, 2007	Siding Spring	K. Sárneczky, L. Kiss	·	2.1 km	MPC · JPL
470327	2007 RQ_{7}	—	September 5, 2007	La Sagra	OAM	·	2.4 km	MPC · JPL
470328	2007 RP_{11}	—	September 10, 2007	Dauban	Chante-Perdrix	·	2.0 km	MPC · JPL
470329	2007 RB_{13}	—	September 2, 2007	Catalina	CSS	·	1.7 km	MPC · JPL
470330	2007 RC_{29}	—	September 4, 2007	Mount Lemmon	Mount Lemmon Survey	·	1.9 km	MPC · JPL
470331	2007 RD_{31}	—	September 5, 2007	Catalina	CSS	·	2.3 km	MPC · JPL
470332	2007 RD_{33}	—	September 5, 2007	Anderson Mesa	LONEOS	·	3.8 km	MPC · JPL
470333	2007 RP_{34}	—	September 6, 2007	Anderson Mesa	LONEOS	DOR	2.2 km	MPC · JPL
470334	2007 RS_{35}	—	September 5, 2007	Catalina	CSS	·	1.6 km	MPC · JPL
470335	2007 RV_{49}	—	September 9, 2007	Mount Lemmon	Mount Lemmon Survey	·	1.4 km	MPC · JPL
470336	2007 RM_{50}	—	September 9, 2007	Kitt Peak	Spacewatch	·	1.8 km	MPC · JPL
470337	2007 RB_{51}	—	September 9, 2007	Kitt Peak	Spacewatch	·	1.9 km	MPC · JPL
470338	2007 RN_{81}	—	September 10, 2007	Mount Lemmon	Mount Lemmon Survey	·	1.4 km	MPC · JPL
470339	2007 RY_{97}	—	September 10, 2007	Kitt Peak	Spacewatch	·	2.6 km	MPC · JPL
470340	2007 RP_{112}	—	September 11, 2007	Kitt Peak	Spacewatch	·	1.7 km	MPC · JPL
470341 Panjianwei	2007 RB_{119}	Panjianwei	September 11, 2007	Purple Mountain	PMO NEO Survey Program	·	1.9 km	MPC · JPL
470342	2007 RM_{140}	—	September 12, 2007	Anderson Mesa	LONEOS	·	1.5 km	MPC · JPL
470343	2007 RA_{147}	—	August 21, 2007	Anderson Mesa	LONEOS	·	1.7 km	MPC · JPL
470344	2007 RV_{162}	—	September 10, 2007	Kitt Peak	Spacewatch	·	2.1 km	MPC · JPL
470345	2007 RA_{165}	—	September 10, 2007	Kitt Peak	Spacewatch	·	1.8 km	MPC · JPL
470346	2007 RA_{166}	—	September 10, 2007	Kitt Peak	Spacewatch	·	2.2 km	MPC · JPL
470347	2007 RM_{169}	—	September 10, 2007	Kitt Peak	Spacewatch	·	1.8 km	MPC · JPL
470348	2007 RG_{180}	—	September 11, 2007	Catalina	CSS	·	2.5 km	MPC · JPL
470349	2007 RA_{188}	—	September 12, 2007	Anderson Mesa	LONEOS	MRX	1.1 km	MPC · JPL
470350	2007 RP_{223}	—	September 8, 2007	Mount Lemmon	Mount Lemmon Survey	·	2.2 km	MPC · JPL
470351	2007 RX_{226}	—	September 10, 2007	Kitt Peak	Spacewatch	·	1.8 km	MPC · JPL
470352	2007 RM_{265}	—	August 23, 2007	Kitt Peak	Spacewatch	·	1.6 km	MPC · JPL
470353	2007 RA_{272}	—	September 15, 2007	Kitt Peak	Spacewatch	·	2.1 km	MPC · JPL
470354	2007 RF_{289}	—	September 11, 2007	Kitt Peak	Spacewatch	·	1.6 km	MPC · JPL
470355	2007 RU_{299}	—	September 13, 2007	Mount Lemmon	Mount Lemmon Survey	·	1.9 km	MPC · JPL
470356	2007 RU_{311}	—	September 4, 2007	Catalina	CSS	AEO	1.2 km	MPC · JPL
470357	2007 RW_{313}	—	September 12, 2007	Catalina	CSS	·	1.8 km	MPC · JPL
470358	2007 RA_{326}	—	September 15, 2007	Mount Lemmon	Mount Lemmon Survey	·	2.9 km	MPC · JPL
470359	2007 SG_{4}	—	September 18, 2007	Socorro	LINEAR	·	2.0 km	MPC · JPL
470360	2007 SL_{11}	—	September 8, 2007	Catalina	CSS	·	2.8 km	MPC · JPL
470361	2007 SV_{21}	—	September 19, 2007	Kitt Peak	Spacewatch	·	2.2 km	MPC · JPL
470362	2007 SL_{22}	—	September 18, 2007	Kitt Peak	Spacewatch	·	2.0 km	MPC · JPL
470363	2007 SR_{23}	—	September 25, 2007	Mount Lemmon	Mount Lemmon Survey	EOS	2.4 km	MPC · JPL
470364	2007 TF_{11}	—	September 9, 2007	Anderson Mesa	LONEOS	·	1.8 km	MPC · JPL
470365	2007 TM_{53}	—	October 4, 2007	Kitt Peak	Spacewatch	·	1.6 km	MPC · JPL
470366	2007 TB_{57}	—	October 4, 2007	Kitt Peak	Spacewatch	·	2.7 km	MPC · JPL
470367	2007 TQ_{68}	—	June 21, 2007	Mount Lemmon	Mount Lemmon Survey	·	1.9 km	MPC · JPL
470368	2007 TC_{69}	—	October 8, 2007	Mount Lemmon	Mount Lemmon Survey	·	1.6 km	MPC · JPL
470369	2007 TN_{88}	—	October 8, 2007	Mount Lemmon	Mount Lemmon Survey	·	2.0 km	MPC · JPL
470370	2007 TD_{111}	—	September 12, 2007	Catalina	CSS	·	2.3 km	MPC · JPL
470371	2007 TV_{116}	—	October 9, 2007	Catalina	CSS	·	2.2 km	MPC · JPL
470372	2007 TU_{125}	—	September 15, 2007	Mount Lemmon	Mount Lemmon Survey	·	2.1 km	MPC · JPL
470373	2007 TO_{133}	—	October 7, 2007	Mount Lemmon	Mount Lemmon Survey	AGN	1.4 km	MPC · JPL
470374	2007 TL_{145}	—	October 6, 2007	Socorro	LINEAR	·	1.8 km	MPC · JPL
470375	2007 TS_{166}	—	October 12, 2007	Socorro	LINEAR	DOR	2.4 km	MPC · JPL
470376	2007 TG_{176}	—	October 5, 2007	Kitt Peak	Spacewatch	·	2.0 km	MPC · JPL
470377	2007 TR_{178}	—	October 7, 2007	Mount Lemmon	Mount Lemmon Survey	·	1.8 km	MPC · JPL
470378	2007 TX_{225}	—	October 8, 2007	Kitt Peak	Spacewatch	·	1.7 km	MPC · JPL
470379	2007 TJ_{238}	—	October 10, 2007	Charleston	Astronomical Research Observatory	·	1.5 km	MPC · JPL
470380	2007 TU_{258}	—	October 10, 2007	Mount Lemmon	Mount Lemmon Survey	·	1.7 km	MPC · JPL
470381	2007 TA_{290}	—	October 12, 2007	Catalina	CSS	·	1.9 km	MPC · JPL
470382	2007 TO_{300}	—	October 8, 2007	Kitt Peak	Spacewatch	·	1.9 km	MPC · JPL
470383	2007 TM_{313}	—	October 11, 2007	Mount Lemmon	Mount Lemmon Survey	·	1.6 km	MPC · JPL
470384	2007 TF_{318}	—	October 12, 2007	Kitt Peak	Spacewatch	KOR	1.3 km	MPC · JPL
470385	2007 TW_{322}	—	October 11, 2007	Kitt Peak	Spacewatch	·	1.7 km	MPC · JPL
470386	2007 TD_{328}	—	October 11, 2007	Kitt Peak	Spacewatch	·	1.9 km	MPC · JPL
470387	2007 TO_{332}	—	October 11, 2007	Kitt Peak	Spacewatch	·	1.9 km	MPC · JPL
470388	2007 TP_{333}	—	October 11, 2007	Kitt Peak	Spacewatch	·	1.8 km	MPC · JPL
470389	2007 TU_{346}	—	October 13, 2007	Mount Lemmon	Mount Lemmon Survey	·	2.1 km	MPC · JPL
470390	2007 TX_{377}	—	October 12, 2007	Catalina	CSS	·	3.9 km	MPC · JPL
470391	2007 TW_{380}	—	October 14, 2007	Kitt Peak	Spacewatch	·	1.5 km	MPC · JPL
470392	2007 TV_{389}	—	September 15, 2007	Catalina	CSS	·	3.9 km	MPC · JPL
470393	2007 TT_{390}	—	October 8, 2007	Mount Lemmon	Mount Lemmon Survey	·	1.7 km	MPC · JPL
470394	2007 TB_{399}	—	October 15, 2007	Kitt Peak	Spacewatch	·	2.4 km	MPC · JPL
470395	2007 TK_{420}	—	October 9, 2007	Catalina	CSS	·	2.4 km	MPC · JPL
470396	2007 TY_{437}	—	October 12, 2007	Mount Lemmon	Mount Lemmon Survey	615	1.3 km	MPC · JPL
470397	2007 TD_{447}	—	October 10, 2007	Mount Lemmon	Mount Lemmon Survey	·	1.9 km	MPC · JPL
470398	2007 UN_{20}	—	October 9, 2007	Kitt Peak	Spacewatch	·	3.0 km	MPC · JPL
470399	2007 UG_{24}	—	October 8, 2007	Mount Lemmon	Mount Lemmon Survey	·	1.2 km	MPC · JPL
470400	2007 UY_{34}	—	October 19, 2007	Kitt Peak	Spacewatch	·	1.9 km	MPC · JPL

== 470401–470500 ==
back to top

Designation			Discovery			Properties		Ref
Permanent	Provisional	Named after	Date	Site	Discoverer(s)	Category	Diam.	Ref
470401	2007 UD_{41}	—	October 16, 2007	Kitt Peak	Spacewatch	·	1.8 km	MPC · JPL
470402	2007 UJ_{47}	—	October 17, 2007	Mount Lemmon	Mount Lemmon Survey	·	2.0 km	MPC · JPL
470403	2007 UV_{71}	—	October 30, 2007	Mount Lemmon	Mount Lemmon Survey	KOR	1.3 km	MPC · JPL
470404	2007 UD_{79}	—	October 10, 2007	Kitt Peak	Spacewatch	KOR	1.3 km	MPC · JPL
470405	2007 UT_{81}	—	October 30, 2007	Kitt Peak	Spacewatch	·	560 m	MPC · JPL
470406	2007 UN_{91}	—	October 17, 2007	Mount Lemmon	Mount Lemmon Survey	·	1.7 km	MPC · JPL
470407	2007 UZ_{96}	—	October 30, 2007	Kitt Peak	Spacewatch	KOR	1.1 km	MPC · JPL
470408	2007 UH_{101}	—	October 30, 2007	Kitt Peak	Spacewatch	·	580 m	MPC · JPL
470409	2007 UK_{101}	—	October 16, 2007	Mount Lemmon	Mount Lemmon Survey	·	2.4 km	MPC · JPL
470410	2007 UT_{127}	—	October 19, 2007	Catalina	CSS	·	2.5 km	MPC · JPL
470411	2007 UH_{133}	—	October 30, 2007	Kitt Peak	Spacewatch	KOR	1.2 km	MPC · JPL
470412	2007 UR_{137}	—	October 17, 2007	Mount Lemmon	Mount Lemmon Survey	·	3.0 km	MPC · JPL
470413	2007 VG_{24}	—	September 15, 2007	Mount Lemmon	Mount Lemmon Survey	·	2.6 km	MPC · JPL
470414	2007 VS_{32}	—	October 11, 2007	Kitt Peak	Spacewatch	·	1.5 km	MPC · JPL
470415	2007 VJ_{54}	—	November 1, 2007	Kitt Peak	Spacewatch	·	1.2 km	MPC · JPL
470416	2007 VA_{91}	—	November 2, 2007	Catalina	CSS	PHO	900 m	MPC · JPL
470417	2007 VM_{92}	—	November 2, 2007	Socorro	LINEAR	·	2.1 km	MPC · JPL
470418	2007 VK_{95}	—	October 8, 2007	Catalina	CSS	·	1.7 km	MPC · JPL
470419	2007 VJ_{152}	—	October 16, 2007	Mount Lemmon	Mount Lemmon Survey	·	2.2 km	MPC · JPL
470420	2007 VO_{162}	—	August 29, 2006	Kitt Peak	Spacewatch	·	2.1 km	MPC · JPL
470421	2007 VK_{169}	—	November 5, 2007	Kitt Peak	Spacewatch	·	790 m	MPC · JPL
470422	2007 VP_{173}	—	November 2, 2007	Catalina	CSS	·	1.5 km	MPC · JPL
470423 Endeavour	2007 VN_{185}	Endeavour	November 7, 2007	Charleston	Astronomical Research Observatory	KOR	1.2 km	MPC · JPL
470424	2007 VN_{212}	—	September 10, 2007	Mount Lemmon	Mount Lemmon Survey	·	2.3 km	MPC · JPL
470425	2007 VX_{240}	—	September 21, 2007	XuYi	PMO NEO Survey Program	·	2.0 km	MPC · JPL
470426	2007 VN_{242}	—	October 12, 2007	Anderson Mesa	LONEOS	·	2.2 km	MPC · JPL
470427	2007 VP_{242}	—	October 9, 2007	Catalina	CSS	·	3.5 km	MPC · JPL
470428	2007 VW_{258}	—	October 12, 2007	Mount Lemmon	Mount Lemmon Survey	·	2.1 km	MPC · JPL
470429	2007 VU_{272}	—	October 10, 2007	Mount Lemmon	Mount Lemmon Survey	·	2.6 km	MPC · JPL
470430	2007 VH_{295}	—	October 31, 2007	Mount Lemmon	Mount Lemmon Survey	·	2.0 km	MPC · JPL
470431	2007 VY_{320}	—	November 2, 2007	Catalina	CSS	·	2.3 km	MPC · JPL
470432	2007 VC_{322}	—	November 9, 2007	Catalina	CSS	·	3.5 km	MPC · JPL
470433	2007 VY_{324}	—	November 8, 2007	Kitt Peak	Spacewatch	·	3.4 km	MPC · JPL
470434	2007 VT_{329}	—	December 4, 2007	Catalina	CSS	·	1.8 km	MPC · JPL
470435	2007 VV_{332}	—	November 8, 2007	Mount Lemmon	Mount Lemmon Survey	·	3.2 km	MPC · JPL
470436	2007 VU_{333}	—	November 11, 2007	Mount Lemmon	Mount Lemmon Survey	EOS	2.1 km	MPC · JPL
470437	2007 WG_{13}	—	November 18, 2007	Mount Lemmon	Mount Lemmon Survey	·	2.1 km	MPC · JPL
470438	2007 WA_{22}	—	November 17, 2007	Kitt Peak	Spacewatch	·	2.1 km	MPC · JPL
470439	2007 WF_{29}	—	November 2, 2007	Kitt Peak	Spacewatch	·	2.4 km	MPC · JPL
470440	2007 WY_{45}	—	August 22, 2007	Kitt Peak	Spacewatch	·	2.6 km	MPC · JPL
470441	2007 XE_{29}	—	October 10, 2007	Kitt Peak	Spacewatch	·	1.5 km	MPC · JPL
470442	2007 XJ_{44}	—	December 15, 2007	Kitt Peak	Spacewatch	·	1.6 km	MPC · JPL
470443	2007 XV_{50}	—	December 13, 2007	Palomar Mountain	M. E. Schwamb, M. E. Brown, D. Rabinowitz	cubewano (hot)	563 km	MPC · JPL
470444	2007 YD_{11}	—	December 17, 2007	Kitt Peak	Spacewatch	·	700 m	MPC · JPL
470445	2007 YF_{16}	—	December 5, 2007	Kitt Peak	Spacewatch	EOS	1.9 km	MPC · JPL
470446	2007 YA_{21}	—	December 16, 2007	Mount Lemmon	Mount Lemmon Survey	·	670 m	MPC · JPL
470447	2007 YP_{21}	—	December 16, 2007	Kitt Peak	Spacewatch	·	1.7 km	MPC · JPL
470448	2007 YA_{25}	—	December 18, 2007	Catalina	CSS	·	3.1 km	MPC · JPL
470449	2007 YY_{32}	—	December 18, 2007	Kitt Peak	Spacewatch	·	2.0 km	MPC · JPL
470450	2007 YM_{36}	—	November 11, 2007	Mount Lemmon	Mount Lemmon Survey	·	2.7 km	MPC · JPL
470451	2007 YQ_{36}	—	December 17, 2007	Kitt Peak	Spacewatch	EOS	1.9 km	MPC · JPL
470452	2007 YP_{38}	—	December 30, 2007	Mount Lemmon	Mount Lemmon Survey	·	4.7 km	MPC · JPL
470453	2007 YA_{39}	—	December 17, 2007	Kitt Peak	Spacewatch	·	3.1 km	MPC · JPL
470454	2007 YX_{47}	—	November 1, 2007	Kitt Peak	Spacewatch	·	2.2 km	MPC · JPL
470455	2007 YE_{58}	—	November 13, 2007	Mount Lemmon	Mount Lemmon Survey	·	2.8 km	MPC · JPL
470456	2007 YA_{63}	—	December 30, 2007	Mount Lemmon	Mount Lemmon Survey	·	1.9 km	MPC · JPL
470457	2007 YH_{67}	—	December 16, 2007	Mount Lemmon	Mount Lemmon Survey	EOS	1.6 km	MPC · JPL
470458	2007 YV_{68}	—	December 16, 2007	Mount Lemmon	Mount Lemmon Survey	·	2.4 km	MPC · JPL
470459	2007 YU_{74}	—	December 31, 2007	Mount Lemmon	Mount Lemmon Survey	·	3.3 km	MPC · JPL
470460	2008 AJ_{3}	—	December 19, 2007	Kitt Peak	Spacewatch	·	4.0 km	MPC · JPL
470461	2008 AN_{15}	—	December 30, 2007	Kitt Peak	Spacewatch	·	3.3 km	MPC · JPL
470462	2008 AT_{26}	—	January 10, 2008	Kitt Peak	Spacewatch	·	960 m	MPC · JPL
470463	2008 AZ_{26}	—	December 30, 2007	Mount Lemmon	Mount Lemmon Survey	·	3.8 km	MPC · JPL
470464	2008 AZ_{35}	—	January 10, 2008	Kitt Peak	Spacewatch	·	3.8 km	MPC · JPL
470465	2008 AV_{48}	—	January 11, 2008	Kitt Peak	Spacewatch	·	1.9 km	MPC · JPL
470466	2008 AL_{56}	—	January 11, 2008	Kitt Peak	Spacewatch	·	2.5 km	MPC · JPL
470467	2008 AE_{67}	—	September 16, 2006	Catalina	CSS	·	870 m	MPC · JPL
470468	2008 AN_{68}	—	January 11, 2008	Mount Lemmon	Mount Lemmon Survey	·	4.6 km	MPC · JPL
470469	2008 AJ_{72}	—	January 14, 2008	Kitt Peak	Spacewatch	·	2.0 km	MPC · JPL
470470	2008 AC_{73}	—	November 11, 2007	Mount Lemmon	Mount Lemmon Survey	·	2.8 km	MPC · JPL
470471	2008 AP_{79}	—	December 31, 2007	Mount Lemmon	Mount Lemmon Survey	CYB	4.8 km	MPC · JPL
470472	2008 AY_{88}	—	December 14, 2007	Mount Lemmon	Mount Lemmon Survey	·	660 m	MPC · JPL
470473	2008 AB_{97}	—	January 1, 2008	Kitt Peak	Spacewatch	·	2.8 km	MPC · JPL
470474	2008 AD_{101}	—	January 14, 2008	Kitt Peak	Spacewatch	VER	2.6 km	MPC · JPL
470475	2008 AB_{103}	—	January 15, 2008	Mount Lemmon	Mount Lemmon Survey	·	2.0 km	MPC · JPL
470476	2008 AS_{110}	—	December 30, 2007	Kitt Peak	Spacewatch	·	3.1 km	MPC · JPL
470477	2008 AS_{115}	—	January 11, 2008	Kitt Peak	Spacewatch	·	2.8 km	MPC · JPL
470478	2008 AE_{129}	—	January 13, 2008	Kitt Peak	Spacewatch	PHO	1 km	MPC · JPL
470479	2008 AM_{134}	—	January 1, 2008	Kitt Peak	Spacewatch	·	2.9 km	MPC · JPL
470480	2008 AM_{135}	—	January 11, 2008	Catalina	CSS	·	2.7 km	MPC · JPL
470481	2008 BN_{4}	—	January 16, 2008	Kitt Peak	Spacewatch	·	2.8 km	MPC · JPL
470482	2008 BZ_{7}	—	January 16, 2008	Kitt Peak	Spacewatch	·	2.7 km	MPC · JPL
470483	2008 BE_{13}	—	January 19, 2008	Mount Lemmon	Mount Lemmon Survey	·	600 m	MPC · JPL
470484	2008 BM_{19}	—	December 5, 2007	Kitt Peak	Spacewatch	·	2.2 km	MPC · JPL
470485	2008 BA_{21}	—	January 30, 2008	Mount Lemmon	Mount Lemmon Survey	(2076)	660 m	MPC · JPL
470486	2008 BV_{26}	—	December 30, 2007	Kitt Peak	Spacewatch	·	790 m	MPC · JPL
470487	2008 BG_{27}	—	January 14, 2008	Kitt Peak	Spacewatch	·	770 m	MPC · JPL
470488	2008 BC_{44}	—	November 18, 2007	Mount Lemmon	Mount Lemmon Survey	·	2.1 km	MPC · JPL
470489	2008 BD_{45}	—	November 21, 2007	Mount Lemmon	Mount Lemmon Survey	·	3.2 km	MPC · JPL
470490	2008 BE_{50}	—	January 18, 2008	Kitt Peak	Spacewatch	·	2.5 km	MPC · JPL
470491	2008 BG_{50}	—	January 19, 2008	Kitt Peak	Spacewatch	THM	2.3 km	MPC · JPL
470492	2008 BZ_{52}	—	January 18, 2008	Mount Lemmon	Mount Lemmon Survey	·	1.6 km	MPC · JPL
470493	2008 BJ_{53}	—	January 19, 2008	Mount Lemmon	Mount Lemmon Survey	·	1.3 km	MPC · JPL
470494	2008 CC_{26}	—	February 2, 2008	Kitt Peak	Spacewatch	·	1.5 km	MPC · JPL
470495	2008 CF_{33}	—	February 2, 2008	Kitt Peak	Spacewatch	·	3.3 km	MPC · JPL
470496	2008 CS_{34}	—	February 2, 2008	Kitt Peak	Spacewatch	·	2.2 km	MPC · JPL
470497	2008 CS_{37}	—	January 11, 2008	Mount Lemmon	Mount Lemmon Survey	·	860 m	MPC · JPL
470498	2008 CS_{55}	—	February 7, 2008	Kitt Peak	Spacewatch	·	660 m	MPC · JPL
470499	2008 CV_{58}	—	January 15, 2008	Mount Lemmon	Mount Lemmon Survey	VER	2.7 km	MPC · JPL
470500	2008 CF_{61}	—	February 7, 2008	Mount Lemmon	Mount Lemmon Survey	·	2.4 km	MPC · JPL

== 470501–470600 ==
back to top

Designation			Discovery			Properties		Ref
Permanent	Provisional	Named after	Date	Site	Discoverer(s)	Category	Diam.	Ref
470501	2008 CS_{64}	—	February 8, 2008	Mount Lemmon	Mount Lemmon Survey	·	2.7 km	MPC · JPL
470502	2008 CU_{68}	—	January 19, 2008	Mount Lemmon	Mount Lemmon Survey	·	3.8 km	MPC · JPL
470503	2008 CX_{71}	—	January 12, 2008	Catalina	CSS	·	4.0 km	MPC · JPL
470504	2008 CZ_{89}	—	February 8, 2008	Kitt Peak	Spacewatch	EOS	1.7 km	MPC · JPL
470505	2008 CL_{90}	—	January 13, 2008	Kitt Peak	Spacewatch	·	3.9 km	MPC · JPL
470506	2008 CS_{94}	—	February 8, 2008	Mount Lemmon	Mount Lemmon Survey	·	750 m	MPC · JPL
470507	2008 CW_{94}	—	February 8, 2008	Mount Lemmon	Mount Lemmon Survey	ERI	1.1 km	MPC · JPL
470508	2008 CE_{99}	—	December 15, 2007	Kitt Peak	Spacewatch	·	4.2 km	MPC · JPL
470509	2008 CL_{101}	—	February 9, 2008	Kitt Peak	Spacewatch	·	880 m	MPC · JPL
470510	2008 CJ_{116}	—	February 10, 2008	Kitt Peak	Spacewatch	AMO	530 m	MPC · JPL
470511	2008 CJ_{125}	—	December 4, 2007	Kitt Peak	Spacewatch	·	910 m	MPC · JPL
470512	2008 CS_{128}	—	February 8, 2008	Kitt Peak	Spacewatch	·	820 m	MPC · JPL
470513	2008 CV_{129}	—	February 8, 2008	Kitt Peak	Spacewatch	·	3.0 km	MPC · JPL
470514	2008 CK_{132}	—	February 8, 2008	Kitt Peak	Spacewatch	·	2.4 km	MPC · JPL
470515	2008 CX_{134}	—	February 8, 2008	Mount Lemmon	Mount Lemmon Survey	·	2.4 km	MPC · JPL
470516	2008 CQ_{138}	—	February 8, 2008	Kitt Peak	Spacewatch	·	620 m	MPC · JPL
470517	2008 CE_{146}	—	February 9, 2008	Kitt Peak	Spacewatch	·	800 m	MPC · JPL
470518	2008 CR_{148}	—	January 16, 2008	Kitt Peak	Spacewatch	VER	2.9 km	MPC · JPL
470519	2008 CU_{151}	—	February 2, 2008	Kitt Peak	Spacewatch	·	3.2 km	MPC · JPL
470520	2008 CM_{154}	—	November 17, 2006	Mount Lemmon	Mount Lemmon Survey	·	2.3 km	MPC · JPL
470521	2008 CC_{161}	—	February 9, 2008	Kitt Peak	Spacewatch	·	1.1 km	MPC · JPL
470522	2008 CM_{187}	—	December 17, 2001	Socorro	LINEAR	·	3.5 km	MPC · JPL
470523	2008 CS_{190}	—	February 11, 2008	Palomar Mountain	M. E. Schwamb, M. E. Brown, D. Rabinowitz	res · 3:5	213 km	MPC · JPL
470524	2008 CW_{193}	—	February 8, 2008	Mount Lemmon	Mount Lemmon Survey	·	910 m	MPC · JPL
470525	2008 CQ_{198}	—	February 12, 2008	Kitt Peak	Spacewatch	·	3.0 km	MPC · JPL
470526	2008 CN_{205}	—	February 2, 2008	Kitt Peak	Spacewatch	·	2.0 km	MPC · JPL
470527	2008 CT_{210}	—	February 2, 2008	Kitt Peak	Spacewatch	·	2.6 km	MPC · JPL
470528	2008 CQ_{212}	—	February 8, 2008	Mount Lemmon	Mount Lemmon Survey	·	660 m	MPC · JPL
470529	2008 CQ_{215}	—	February 13, 2008	Mount Lemmon	Mount Lemmon Survey	MAS	680 m	MPC · JPL
470530	2008 DC_{7}	—	February 24, 2008	Kitt Peak	Spacewatch	·	3.9 km	MPC · JPL
470531	2008 DE_{7}	—	January 11, 2008	Kitt Peak	Spacewatch	·	2.7 km	MPC · JPL
470532	2008 DU_{20}	—	February 3, 2008	Catalina	CSS	·	3.4 km	MPC · JPL
470533	2008 DF_{23}	—	January 11, 2008	Catalina	CSS	·	460 m	MPC · JPL
470534	2008 DV_{27}	—	January 14, 2008	Kitt Peak	Spacewatch	T_{j} (2.99)	2.8 km	MPC · JPL
470535	2008 DY_{30}	—	February 27, 2008	Kitt Peak	Spacewatch	·	4.6 km	MPC · JPL
470536	2008 DM_{34}	—	February 27, 2008	Kitt Peak	Spacewatch	PHO	810 m	MPC · JPL
470537	2008 DO_{39}	—	February 27, 2008	Mount Lemmon	Mount Lemmon Survey	·	1.2 km	MPC · JPL
470538	2008 DT_{48}	—	February 10, 2008	Catalina	CSS	·	3.6 km	MPC · JPL
470539	2008 DP_{54}	—	February 27, 2008	Catalina	CSS	·	4.4 km	MPC · JPL
470540	2008 DH_{55}	—	February 26, 2008	Kitt Peak	Spacewatch	URS	5.2 km	MPC · JPL
470541	2008 EP_{10}	—	November 24, 2003	Kitt Peak	Spacewatch	·	830 m	MPC · JPL
470542	2008 EZ_{16}	—	March 1, 2008	Kitt Peak	Spacewatch	MAS	670 m	MPC · JPL
470543	2008 EG_{40}	—	March 4, 2008	Kitt Peak	Spacewatch	·	960 m	MPC · JPL
470544	2008 EU_{41}	—	February 9, 2008	Mount Lemmon	Mount Lemmon Survey	·	3.0 km	MPC · JPL
470545	2008 EW_{75}	—	November 19, 2006	Catalina	CSS	·	3.1 km	MPC · JPL
470546	2008 EY_{77}	—	March 7, 2008	Kitt Peak	Spacewatch	ERI	1.2 km	MPC · JPL
470547	2008 EG_{84}	—	March 10, 2008	Mount Nyukasa	Japan Aerospace Exploration Agency	·	580 m	MPC · JPL
470548	2008 EC_{87}	—	December 20, 2007	Mount Lemmon	Mount Lemmon Survey	PHO	1.2 km	MPC · JPL
470549	2008 EW_{108}	—	February 13, 2008	Kitt Peak	Spacewatch	·	810 m	MPC · JPL
470550	2008 EV_{109}	—	March 7, 2008	Mount Lemmon	Mount Lemmon Survey	·	4.7 km	MPC · JPL
470551	2008 EZ_{139}	—	February 26, 2008	Mount Lemmon	Mount Lemmon Survey	NYS	860 m	MPC · JPL
470552	2008 EA_{165}	—	March 1, 2008	Kitt Peak	Spacewatch	·	980 m	MPC · JPL
470553	2008 EB_{165}	—	March 1, 2008	Kitt Peak	Spacewatch	·	1.7 km	MPC · JPL
470554	2008 FC_{2}	—	March 25, 2008	Kitt Peak	Spacewatch	·	3.3 km	MPC · JPL
470555	2008 FO_{10}	—	February 8, 2008	Kitt Peak	Spacewatch	VER	2.5 km	MPC · JPL
470556	2008 FV_{11}	—	February 8, 2008	Kitt Peak	Spacewatch	·	2.5 km	MPC · JPL
470557	2008 FF_{23}	—	March 10, 2008	Mount Lemmon	Mount Lemmon Survey	·	1.0 km	MPC · JPL
470558	2008 FN_{44}	—	March 28, 2008	Mount Lemmon	Mount Lemmon Survey	·	890 m	MPC · JPL
470559	2008 FZ_{54}	—	March 28, 2008	Mount Lemmon	Mount Lemmon Survey	·	980 m	MPC · JPL
470560	2008 FC_{67}	—	March 28, 2008	Kitt Peak	Spacewatch	·	990 m	MPC · JPL
470561	2008 FT_{105}	—	March 31, 2008	Kitt Peak	Spacewatch	·	4.0 km	MPC · JPL
470562	2008 FH_{106}	—	March 10, 2008	Kitt Peak	Spacewatch	·	840 m	MPC · JPL
470563	2008 FR_{130}	—	March 30, 2008	Kitt Peak	Spacewatch	·	1.2 km	MPC · JPL
470564	2008 GC_{8}	—	March 5, 2008	Mount Lemmon	Mount Lemmon Survey	MAS	610 m	MPC · JPL
470565	2008 GX_{16}	—	April 3, 2008	Kitt Peak	Spacewatch	·	1.1 km	MPC · JPL
470566	2008 GZ_{61}	—	April 5, 2008	Mount Lemmon	Mount Lemmon Survey	PHO	770 m	MPC · JPL
470567	2008 GQ_{67}	—	April 6, 2008	Kitt Peak	Spacewatch	·	870 m	MPC · JPL
470568	2008 GC_{96}	—	April 8, 2008	Kitt Peak	Spacewatch	·	2.7 km	MPC · JPL
470569	2008 GF_{103}	—	March 4, 2008	Kitt Peak	Spacewatch	·	830 m	MPC · JPL
470570	2008 GB_{119}	—	April 11, 2008	Kitt Peak	Spacewatch	·	1.2 km	MPC · JPL
470571	2008 GM_{128}	—	March 30, 2008	Catalina	CSS	PHO	900 m	MPC · JPL
470572	2008 GR_{128}	—	March 6, 2008	Catalina	CSS	H	540 m	MPC · JPL
470573	2008 GU_{130}	—	April 6, 2008	Kitt Peak	Spacewatch	V	730 m	MPC · JPL
470574	2008 GD_{146}	—	April 14, 2008	Mount Lemmon	Mount Lemmon Survey	·	1.3 km	MPC · JPL
470575	2008 GH_{146}	—	April 15, 2008	Kitt Peak	Spacewatch	·	1.6 km	MPC · JPL
470576	2008 HM_{5}	—	August 30, 2005	Kitt Peak	Spacewatch	·	1.2 km	MPC · JPL
470577	2008 HW_{17}	—	April 15, 2008	Mount Lemmon	Mount Lemmon Survey	·	1.4 km	MPC · JPL
470578	2008 HD_{28}	—	April 11, 2008	Mount Lemmon	Mount Lemmon Survey	NYS	840 m	MPC · JPL
470579	2008 HF_{33}	—	April 29, 2008	Kitt Peak	Spacewatch	NYS	850 m	MPC · JPL
470580	2008 HZ_{34}	—	April 27, 2008	Kitt Peak	Spacewatch	PHO	1.1 km	MPC · JPL
470581	2008 HC_{55}	—	April 29, 2008	Kitt Peak	Spacewatch	·	800 m	MPC · JPL
470582	2008 JP_{3}	—	March 12, 2008	Mount Lemmon	Mount Lemmon Survey	V	680 m	MPC · JPL
470583	2008 JJ_{11}	—	May 3, 2008	Kitt Peak	Spacewatch	·	1.1 km	MPC · JPL
470584	2008 JG_{13}	—	February 29, 2008	Mount Lemmon	Mount Lemmon Survey	·	3.9 km	MPC · JPL
470585	2008 JQ_{14}	—	May 5, 2008	Catalina	CSS	AMO	550 m	MPC · JPL
470586	2008 JP_{23}	—	April 29, 2008	Kitt Peak	Spacewatch	·	1.1 km	MPC · JPL
470587	2008 JJ_{25}	—	May 6, 2008	Kitt Peak	Spacewatch	·	860 m	MPC · JPL
470588	2008 JH_{33}	—	April 14, 2008	Mount Lemmon	Mount Lemmon Survey	·	1.3 km	MPC · JPL
470589	2008 JO_{36}	—	May 4, 2008	Kitt Peak	Spacewatch	PHO	760 m	MPC · JPL
470590	2008 KC_{8}	—	May 27, 2008	Kitt Peak	Spacewatch	NYS	910 m	MPC · JPL
470591	2008 KW_{26}	—	May 13, 2008	Mount Lemmon	Mount Lemmon Survey	·	1.2 km	MPC · JPL
470592	2008 KN_{37}	—	May 30, 2008	Kitt Peak	Spacewatch	·	1.2 km	MPC · JPL
470593	2008 LP_{17}	—	June 6, 2008	Palomar Mountain	M. E. Schwamb, M. E. Brown, D. Rabinowitz	centaur	273 km	MPC · JPL
470594	2008 MN_{1}	—	June 29, 2008	Siding Spring	SSS	AMO	340 m	MPC · JPL
470595	2008 NM_{3}	—	July 13, 2008	Eskridge	G. Hug	RAF	820 m	MPC · JPL
470596	2008 NW_{4}	—	July 7, 2008	Palomar Mountain	M. E. Schwamb, M. E. Brown, D. Rabinowitz	cubewano (hot)	346 km	MPC · JPL
470597	2008 OW_{2}	—	July 28, 2008	Mount Lemmon	Mount Lemmon Survey	H	590 m	MPC · JPL
470598	2008 OR_{13}	—	July 31, 2008	Bergisch Gladbach	W. Bickel	PHO	960 m	MPC · JPL
470599	2008 OG_{19}	—	July 30, 2008	Palomar Mountain	M. E. Schwamb, M. E. Brown, D. Rabinowitz	SDO	406 km	MPC · JPL
470600 Calogero	2008 PA_{7}	Calogero	August 6, 2008	Vicques	M. Ory	·	1.3 km	MPC · JPL

== 470601–470700 ==
back to top

Designation			Discovery			Properties		Ref
Permanent	Provisional	Named after	Date	Site	Discoverer(s)	Category	Diam.	Ref
470601	2008 QB_{15}	—	August 26, 2008	Dauban	Kugel, F.	·	1.1 km	MPC · JPL
470602	2008 QM_{16}	—	August 24, 2008	La Cañada	Lacruz, J.	·	1.1 km	MPC · JPL
470603	2008 QF_{23}	—	August 26, 2008	Socorro	LINEAR	·	1.9 km	MPC · JPL
470604	2008 QB_{38}	—	August 23, 2008	Kitt Peak	Spacewatch	MAR	1.0 km	MPC · JPL
470605	2008 QF_{43}	—	August 28, 2008	La Sagra	OAM	·	830 m	MPC · JPL
470606	2008 QU_{45}	—	April 11, 2003	Kitt Peak	Spacewatch	·	1.8 km	MPC · JPL
470607	2008 RG_{8}	—	September 3, 2008	Kitt Peak	Spacewatch	(5)	1.2 km	MPC · JPL
470608	2008 RB_{28}	—	September 1, 2008	La Sagra	OAM	H	510 m	MPC · JPL
470609	2008 RO_{47}	—	August 22, 2004	Kitt Peak	Spacewatch	·	890 m	MPC · JPL
470610	2008 RQ_{52}	—	September 3, 2008	Kitt Peak	Spacewatch	·	690 m	MPC · JPL
470611	2008 RL_{64}	—	September 4, 2008	Kitt Peak	Spacewatch	·	1.5 km	MPC · JPL
470612	2008 RQ_{99}	—	September 2, 2008	Kitt Peak	Spacewatch	·	880 m	MPC · JPL
470613	2008 RH_{100}	—	September 2, 2008	Kitt Peak	Spacewatch	·	1.1 km	MPC · JPL
470614	2008 RW_{107}	—	September 9, 2008	Catalina	CSS	·	1.0 km	MPC · JPL
470615	2008 RW_{109}	—	September 3, 2008	Kitt Peak	Spacewatch	·	1.1 km	MPC · JPL
470616	2008 RT_{115}	—	September 7, 2008	Mount Lemmon	Mount Lemmon Survey	MAR	790 m	MPC · JPL
470617	2008 RJ_{118}	—	September 9, 2008	Mount Lemmon	Mount Lemmon Survey	·	1.6 km	MPC · JPL
470618	2008 RJ_{120}	—	September 9, 2008	Catalina	CSS	·	1.8 km	MPC · JPL
470619	2008 RE_{128}	—	September 7, 2008	Mount Lemmon	Mount Lemmon Survey	·	1.1 km	MPC · JPL
470620	2008 RW_{129}	—	September 9, 2008	Mount Lemmon	Mount Lemmon Survey	(5)	890 m	MPC · JPL
470621	2008 RK_{130}	—	September 9, 2008	Mount Lemmon	Mount Lemmon Survey	EUN	1.2 km	MPC · JPL
470622	2008 RC_{132}	—	September 6, 2008	Catalina	CSS	·	1.9 km	MPC · JPL
470623	2008 RT_{145}	—	September 7, 2008	Mount Lemmon	Mount Lemmon Survey	·	2.7 km	MPC · JPL
470624	2008 SF_{27}	—	September 19, 2008	Kitt Peak	Spacewatch	·	570 m	MPC · JPL
470625	2008 SL_{29}	—	September 4, 2008	Kitt Peak	Spacewatch	·	1 km	MPC · JPL
470626	2008 SP_{30}	—	September 5, 2008	Kitt Peak	Spacewatch	·	1.6 km	MPC · JPL
470627	2008 SD_{32}	—	September 20, 2008	Kitt Peak	Spacewatch	·	1.2 km	MPC · JPL
470628	2008 SH_{32}	—	September 20, 2008	Kitt Peak	Spacewatch	·	1.1 km	MPC · JPL
470629	2008 SH_{39}	—	September 20, 2008	Kitt Peak	Spacewatch	·	1.2 km	MPC · JPL
470630	2008 SM_{42}	—	September 20, 2008	Kitt Peak	Spacewatch	·	770 m	MPC · JPL
470631	2008 SZ_{46}	—	September 20, 2008	Kitt Peak	Spacewatch	·	750 m	MPC · JPL
470632	2008 SS_{47}	—	September 2, 2008	Kitt Peak	Spacewatch	·	1.3 km	MPC · JPL
470633	2008 SH_{55}	—	September 20, 2008	Mount Lemmon	Mount Lemmon Survey	(5)	950 m	MPC · JPL
470634	2008 SK_{57}	—	September 20, 2008	Mount Lemmon	Mount Lemmon Survey	·	840 m	MPC · JPL
470635	2008 SC_{70}	—	September 22, 2008	Kitt Peak	Spacewatch	·	1.2 km	MPC · JPL
470636	2008 SM_{74}	—	September 23, 2008	Catalina	CSS	·	1.1 km	MPC · JPL
470637	2008 ST_{81}	—	September 9, 2008	Catalina	CSS	·	1.6 km	MPC · JPL
470638	2008 SA_{86}	—	September 20, 2008	Kitt Peak	Spacewatch	·	1.6 km	MPC · JPL
470639	2008 SF_{100}	—	September 21, 2008	Kitt Peak	Spacewatch	·	1.1 km	MPC · JPL
470640	2008 SJ_{101}	—	September 21, 2008	Kitt Peak	Spacewatch	·	1.7 km	MPC · JPL
470641	2008 SP_{102}	—	September 21, 2008	Mount Lemmon	Mount Lemmon Survey	·	1.0 km	MPC · JPL
470642	2008 SK_{103}	—	September 21, 2008	Mount Lemmon	Mount Lemmon Survey	·	1.4 km	MPC · JPL
470643	2008 SC_{109}	—	September 22, 2008	Mount Lemmon	Mount Lemmon Survey	(5)	1 km	MPC · JPL
470644	2008 SJ_{110}	—	September 22, 2008	Kitt Peak	Spacewatch	·	1.3 km	MPC · JPL
470645	2008 SZ_{114}	—	September 22, 2008	Kitt Peak	Spacewatch	·	1.2 km	MPC · JPL
470646	2008 SB_{117}	—	September 22, 2008	Mount Lemmon	Mount Lemmon Survey	·	840 m	MPC · JPL
470647	2008 SY_{117}	—	September 22, 2008	Mount Lemmon	Mount Lemmon Survey	·	1.2 km	MPC · JPL
470648	2008 SC_{118}	—	September 22, 2008	Mount Lemmon	Mount Lemmon Survey	·	1.2 km	MPC · JPL
470649	2008 SS_{118}	—	September 22, 2008	Mount Lemmon	Mount Lemmon Survey	·	1.3 km	MPC · JPL
470650	2008 SM_{124}	—	September 22, 2008	Mount Lemmon	Mount Lemmon Survey	·	1.2 km	MPC · JPL
470651	2008 SD_{128}	—	September 22, 2008	Kitt Peak	Spacewatch	·	1.3 km	MPC · JPL
470652	2008 SU_{129}	—	September 22, 2008	Kitt Peak	Spacewatch	·	1.5 km	MPC · JPL
470653	2008 SM_{130}	—	September 22, 2008	Kitt Peak	Spacewatch	·	1.5 km	MPC · JPL
470654	2008 SD_{131}	—	September 22, 2008	Kitt Peak	Spacewatch	(5)	1.3 km	MPC · JPL
470655	2008 SQ_{139}	—	July 29, 2008	Kitt Peak	Spacewatch	·	1.5 km	MPC · JPL
470656	2008 SV_{140}	—	September 24, 2008	Mount Lemmon	Mount Lemmon Survey	·	1.5 km	MPC · JPL
470657	2008 SC_{150}	—	September 29, 2008	Dauban	Kugel, F.	·	1.0 km	MPC · JPL
470658	2008 SJ_{160}	—	September 9, 2008	Mount Lemmon	Mount Lemmon Survey	·	1.9 km	MPC · JPL
470659	2008 SM_{165}	—	August 24, 2008	Kitt Peak	Spacewatch	·	1.1 km	MPC · JPL
470660	2008 SR_{167}	—	September 23, 2008	Kitt Peak	Spacewatch	·	1.6 km	MPC · JPL
470661	2008 SD_{173}	—	September 22, 2008	Mount Lemmon	Mount Lemmon Survey	·	1.1 km	MPC · JPL
470662	2008 SD_{175}	—	September 23, 2008	Kitt Peak	Spacewatch	·	1.4 km	MPC · JPL
470663	2008 SY_{175}	—	September 23, 2008	Kitt Peak	Spacewatch	·	1.0 km	MPC · JPL
470664	2008 SW_{181}	—	September 24, 2008	Mount Lemmon	Mount Lemmon Survey	·	1.3 km	MPC · JPL
470665	2008 SH_{190}	—	September 25, 2008	Kitt Peak	Spacewatch	(5)	960 m	MPC · JPL
470666	2008 SG_{192}	—	September 25, 2008	Kitt Peak	Spacewatch	·	1.0 km	MPC · JPL
470667	2008 SW_{194}	—	September 25, 2008	Kitt Peak	Spacewatch	·	1.3 km	MPC · JPL
470668	2008 SB_{195}	—	September 25, 2008	Kitt Peak	Spacewatch	·	980 m	MPC · JPL
470669	2008 SL_{199}	—	September 26, 2008	Kitt Peak	Spacewatch	·	1.1 km	MPC · JPL
470670	2008 SP_{200}	—	September 26, 2008	Kitt Peak	Spacewatch	·	1.2 km	MPC · JPL
470671	2008 SL_{203}	—	September 26, 2008	Kitt Peak	Spacewatch	·	1.3 km	MPC · JPL
470672	2008 SX_{205}	—	September 26, 2008	Kitt Peak	Spacewatch	·	1.5 km	MPC · JPL
470673	2008 SM_{209}	—	September 28, 2008	Charleston	Astronomical Research Observatory	·	1.4 km	MPC · JPL
470674	2008 SV_{220}	—	September 9, 2008	Mount Lemmon	Mount Lemmon Survey	(5)	1.1 km	MPC · JPL
470675	2008 SB_{234}	—	September 28, 2008	Mount Lemmon	Mount Lemmon Survey	·	1.1 km	MPC · JPL
470676	2008 SQ_{235}	—	September 28, 2008	Catalina	CSS	(5)	1.1 km	MPC · JPL
470677	2008 SD_{246}	—	September 30, 2008	Catalina	CSS	EUN	1.4 km	MPC · JPL
470678	2008 SS_{251}	—	September 26, 2008	Kitt Peak	Spacewatch	AMO	210 m	MPC · JPL
470679	2008 SE_{267}	—	September 22, 2008	Mount Lemmon	Mount Lemmon Survey	(5)	1.2 km	MPC · JPL
470680	2008 SB_{268}	—	September 23, 2008	Kitt Peak	Spacewatch	·	2.1 km	MPC · JPL
470681	2008 SQ_{270}	—	September 24, 2008	Kitt Peak	Spacewatch	·	1.7 km	MPC · JPL
470682	2008 ST_{276}	—	September 24, 2008	Kitt Peak	Spacewatch	EUN	1.3 km	MPC · JPL
470683	2008 SK_{284}	—	September 24, 2008	Kitt Peak	Spacewatch	GEF	1.2 km	MPC · JPL
470684	2008 SD_{286}	—	September 22, 2008	Kitt Peak	Spacewatch	·	1.8 km	MPC · JPL
470685	2008 ST_{287}	—	September 23, 2008	Kitt Peak	Spacewatch	MRX	970 m	MPC · JPL
470686	2008 SA_{288}	—	September 23, 2008	Mount Lemmon	Mount Lemmon Survey	·	930 m	MPC · JPL
470687	2008 SA_{290}	—	September 28, 2008	Mount Lemmon	Mount Lemmon Survey	·	1.8 km	MPC · JPL
470688	2008 ST_{297}	—	September 22, 2008	Catalina	CSS	·	1.7 km	MPC · JPL
470689	2008 TS_{17}	—	September 22, 2008	Mount Lemmon	Mount Lemmon Survey	(5)	1.1 km	MPC · JPL
470690	2008 TW_{18}	—	October 1, 2008	Mount Lemmon	Mount Lemmon Survey	·	1.0 km	MPC · JPL
470691	2008 TC_{27}	—	October 9, 2008	Mount Lemmon	Mount Lemmon Survey	·	1.2 km	MPC · JPL
470692	2008 TC_{32}	—	September 22, 2008	Kitt Peak	Spacewatch	·	1.4 km	MPC · JPL
470693	2008 TE_{40}	—	October 1, 2008	Mount Lemmon	Mount Lemmon Survey	·	1.5 km	MPC · JPL
470694	2008 TN_{46}	—	October 1, 2008	Kitt Peak	Spacewatch	·	1.3 km	MPC · JPL
470695	2008 TR_{55}	—	September 9, 2008	Mount Lemmon	Mount Lemmon Survey	·	1.2 km	MPC · JPL
470696	2008 TY_{57}	—	October 2, 2008	Kitt Peak	Spacewatch	·	1.7 km	MPC · JPL
470697	2008 TS_{61}	—	September 22, 2008	Mount Lemmon	Mount Lemmon Survey	·	1.0 km	MPC · JPL
470698	2008 TZ_{61}	—	November 19, 2004	Anderson Mesa	LONEOS	·	1.3 km	MPC · JPL
470699	2008 TZ_{62}	—	October 2, 2008	Kitt Peak	Spacewatch	GEF	1.2 km	MPC · JPL
470700	2008 TZ_{64}	—	October 2, 2008	Catalina	CSS	·	970 m	MPC · JPL

== 470701–470800 ==
back to top

Designation			Discovery			Properties		Ref
Permanent	Provisional	Named after	Date	Site	Discoverer(s)	Category	Diam.	Ref
470701	2008 TM_{65}	—	September 22, 2008	Kitt Peak	Spacewatch	·	1.4 km	MPC · JPL
470702	2008 TN_{79}	—	October 2, 2008	Kitt Peak	Spacewatch	·	1.3 km	MPC · JPL
470703	2008 TC_{92}	—	September 21, 2008	Mount Lemmon	Mount Lemmon Survey	H	650 m	MPC · JPL
470704	2008 TG_{112}	—	October 6, 2008	Catalina	CSS	·	930 m	MPC · JPL
470705	2008 TK_{124}	—	September 23, 2008	Kitt Peak	Spacewatch	·	1.7 km	MPC · JPL
470706	2008 TO_{137}	—	October 8, 2008	Kitt Peak	Spacewatch	·	2.3 km	MPC · JPL
470707	2008 TU_{138}	—	September 23, 2008	Kitt Peak	Spacewatch	EUN	1.2 km	MPC · JPL
470708	2008 TM_{157}	—	September 22, 2008	Kitt Peak	Spacewatch	AGN	1.3 km	MPC · JPL
470709	2008 TU_{164}	—	October 2, 2008	Kitt Peak	Spacewatch	·	1.5 km	MPC · JPL
470710	2008 TQ_{170}	—	October 9, 2008	Catalina	CSS	·	1.3 km	MPC · JPL
470711	2008 TJ_{173}	—	October 2, 2008	Mount Lemmon	Mount Lemmon Survey	·	950 m	MPC · JPL
470712	2008 TC_{177}	—	October 9, 2008	Catalina	CSS	·	1.5 km	MPC · JPL
470713	2008 TA_{189}	—	October 10, 2008	Mount Lemmon	Mount Lemmon Survey	·	1.4 km	MPC · JPL
470714	2008 TX_{189}	—	October 4, 2008	Mount Lemmon	Mount Lemmon Survey	(5)	1.1 km	MPC · JPL
470715	2008 UE_{2}	—	October 22, 2008	Sierra Stars	Tozzi, F.	·	910 m	MPC · JPL
470716	2008 UX_{2}	—	September 30, 2008	Mount Lemmon	Mount Lemmon Survey	·	1.3 km	MPC · JPL
470717	2008 UE_{3}	—	September 29, 2008	Catalina	CSS	·	1.2 km	MPC · JPL
470718	2008 UZ_{9}	—	October 17, 2008	Kitt Peak	Spacewatch	·	680 m	MPC · JPL
470719	2008 UZ_{17}	—	October 18, 2008	Kitt Peak	Spacewatch	·	1.0 km	MPC · JPL
470720	2008 UH_{34}	—	October 6, 2008	Mount Lemmon	Mount Lemmon Survey	·	1.5 km	MPC · JPL
470721	2008 UT_{36}	—	October 20, 2008	Kitt Peak	Spacewatch	·	1.4 km	MPC · JPL
470722	2008 UK_{37}	—	October 20, 2008	Kitt Peak	Spacewatch	JUN	1.1 km	MPC · JPL
470723	2008 UD_{39}	—	October 20, 2008	Kitt Peak	Spacewatch	GEF	1.2 km	MPC · JPL
470724	2008 UF_{39}	—	October 20, 2008	Kitt Peak	Spacewatch	·	1.5 km	MPC · JPL
470725	2008 UB_{43}	—	October 6, 2008	Mount Lemmon	Mount Lemmon Survey	EUN	930 m	MPC · JPL
470726	2008 UK_{47}	—	October 20, 2008	Kitt Peak	Spacewatch	H	610 m	MPC · JPL
470727	2008 UQ_{55}	—	October 21, 2008	Kitt Peak	Spacewatch	·	920 m	MPC · JPL
470728	2008 UR_{65}	—	October 21, 2008	Kitt Peak	Spacewatch	·	1.7 km	MPC · JPL
470729	2008 UM_{66}	—	October 21, 2008	Kitt Peak	Spacewatch	(5)	1.0 km	MPC · JPL
470730	2008 UC_{67}	—	October 21, 2008	Kitt Peak	Spacewatch	·	1.4 km	MPC · JPL
470731	2008 UN_{70}	—	October 21, 2008	Kitt Peak	Spacewatch	·	1.3 km	MPC · JPL
470732	2008 UK_{73}	—	October 21, 2008	Kitt Peak	Spacewatch	·	2.1 km	MPC · JPL
470733	2008 UU_{76}	—	September 24, 2008	Mount Lemmon	Mount Lemmon Survey	·	960 m	MPC · JPL
470734	2008 UD_{78}	—	September 28, 2008	Mount Lemmon	Mount Lemmon Survey	·	1.5 km	MPC · JPL
470735	2008 UA_{79}	—	October 22, 2008	Kitt Peak	Spacewatch	(5)	1.0 km	MPC · JPL
470736	2008 UA_{93}	—	October 8, 2008	Catalina	CSS	·	1.3 km	MPC · JPL
470737	2008 UA_{98}	—	September 23, 2008	Mount Lemmon	Mount Lemmon Survey	EUN	1.2 km	MPC · JPL
470738	2008 UV_{108}	—	September 9, 2008	Mount Lemmon	Mount Lemmon Survey	EUN	1.1 km	MPC · JPL
470739	2008 UC_{109}	—	October 21, 2008	Mount Lemmon	Mount Lemmon Survey	·	1.5 km	MPC · JPL
470740	2008 UL_{110}	—	October 1, 2008	Mount Lemmon	Mount Lemmon Survey	·	1.5 km	MPC · JPL
470741	2008 UP_{113}	—	September 6, 2008	Mount Lemmon	Mount Lemmon Survey	(5)	1.0 km	MPC · JPL
470742	2008 UJ_{117}	—	October 22, 2008	Kitt Peak	Spacewatch	·	1.7 km	MPC · JPL
470743	2008 UK_{120}	—	October 22, 2008	Kitt Peak	Spacewatch	·	1.4 km	MPC · JPL
470744	2008 UN_{120}	—	September 23, 2008	Catalina	CSS	·	1.5 km	MPC · JPL
470745	2008 UB_{124}	—	May 28, 2006	Mount Lemmon	Mount Lemmon Survey	·	3.2 km	MPC · JPL
470746	2008 UH_{127}	—	October 22, 2008	Kitt Peak	Spacewatch	·	1.4 km	MPC · JPL
470747	2008 UW_{128}	—	September 7, 2008	Mount Lemmon	Mount Lemmon Survey	·	1.5 km	MPC · JPL
470748	2008 UM_{129}	—	October 23, 2008	Kitt Peak	Spacewatch	·	1.3 km	MPC · JPL
470749	2008 UP_{131}	—	October 23, 2008	Kitt Peak	Spacewatch	·	1.1 km	MPC · JPL
470750	2008 UX_{131}	—	October 23, 2008	Kitt Peak	Spacewatch	·	1.1 km	MPC · JPL
470751	2008 UB_{140}	—	September 25, 2008	Mount Lemmon	Mount Lemmon Survey	·	2.2 km	MPC · JPL
470752	2008 UK_{141}	—	October 23, 2008	Kitt Peak	Spacewatch	MIS	2.0 km	MPC · JPL
470753	2008 UN_{143}	—	September 6, 2008	Mount Lemmon	Mount Lemmon Survey	·	1.1 km	MPC · JPL
470754	2008 UK_{147}	—	October 23, 2008	Kitt Peak	Spacewatch	·	1.1 km	MPC · JPL
470755	2008 UF_{152}	—	September 23, 2008	Kitt Peak	Spacewatch	MAR	1.1 km	MPC · JPL
470756	2008 UZ_{157}	—	September 24, 2008	Mount Lemmon	Mount Lemmon Survey	·	1.5 km	MPC · JPL
470757	2008 UD_{164}	—	October 9, 2008	Kitt Peak	Spacewatch	·	1.5 km	MPC · JPL
470758	2008 UC_{168}	—	October 24, 2008	Kitt Peak	Spacewatch	·	1.5 km	MPC · JPL
470759	2008 UE_{169}	—	September 6, 2008	Mount Lemmon	Mount Lemmon Survey	·	1.3 km	MPC · JPL
470760	2008 UL_{169}	—	October 24, 2008	Kitt Peak	Spacewatch	·	1.2 km	MPC · JPL
470761	2008 UX_{195}	—	September 25, 2008	Mount Lemmon	Mount Lemmon Survey	·	2.2 km	MPC · JPL
470762	2008 US_{198}	—	September 29, 2008	Catalina	CSS	·	1.4 km	MPC · JPL
470763	2008 UZ_{202}	—	October 6, 2008	Catalina	CSS	·	1.2 km	MPC · JPL
470764	2008 UN_{203}	—	October 10, 2008	Catalina	CSS	·	1.9 km	MPC · JPL
470765	2008 UP_{203}	—	October 28, 2008	Socorro	LINEAR	·	1.2 km	MPC · JPL
470766	2008 UG_{209}	—	October 23, 2008	Kitt Peak	Spacewatch	·	1.3 km	MPC · JPL
470767	2008 US_{221}	—	October 25, 2008	Kitt Peak	Spacewatch	·	1.5 km	MPC · JPL
470768	2008 UU_{231}	—	October 26, 2008	Kitt Peak	Spacewatch	·	1.5 km	MPC · JPL
470769	2008 UK_{240}	—	October 26, 2008	Kitt Peak	Spacewatch	·	1.3 km	MPC · JPL
470770	2008 UR_{244}	—	October 26, 2008	Catalina	CSS	·	1.6 km	MPC · JPL
470771	2008 UV_{244}	—	September 9, 2008	Catalina	CSS	·	1.8 km	MPC · JPL
470772	2008 UZ_{248}	—	September 30, 2008	Catalina	CSS	H	590 m	MPC · JPL
470773	2008 UV_{250}	—	October 27, 2008	Kitt Peak	Spacewatch	(5)	1.2 km	MPC · JPL
470774	2008 UJ_{255}	—	September 27, 2008	Mount Lemmon	Mount Lemmon Survey	EUN	1.1 km	MPC · JPL
470775	2008 UJ_{257}	—	September 22, 2008	Mount Lemmon	Mount Lemmon Survey	·	1.8 km	MPC · JPL
470776	2008 UU_{258}	—	September 24, 2008	Mount Lemmon	Mount Lemmon Survey	·	1.2 km	MPC · JPL
470777	2008 UA_{262}	—	October 27, 2008	Kitt Peak	Spacewatch	·	1.6 km	MPC · JPL
470778	2008 UU_{263}	—	October 27, 2008	Mount Lemmon	Mount Lemmon Survey	·	1.4 km	MPC · JPL
470779	2008 UO_{266}	—	October 28, 2008	Kitt Peak	Spacewatch	(5)	1.1 km	MPC · JPL
470780	2008 UC_{273}	—	October 28, 2008	Kitt Peak	Spacewatch	NEM	2.2 km	MPC · JPL
470781	2008 UT_{276}	—	October 28, 2008	Mount Lemmon	Mount Lemmon Survey	·	980 m	MPC · JPL
470782	2008 UE_{287}	—	October 1, 2008	Kitt Peak	Spacewatch	·	2.1 km	MPC · JPL
470783	2008 UD_{289}	—	October 28, 2008	Kitt Peak	Spacewatch	·	1.4 km	MPC · JPL
470784	2008 UX_{297}	—	October 29, 2008	Kitt Peak	Spacewatch	·	1.6 km	MPC · JPL
470785	2008 UX_{299}	—	October 21, 2008	Kitt Peak	Spacewatch	·	1.4 km	MPC · JPL
470786	2008 UN_{301}	—	October 21, 2008	Kitt Peak	Spacewatch	(5)	1.2 km	MPC · JPL
470787	2008 US_{302}	—	October 21, 2008	Kitt Peak	Spacewatch	·	1.2 km	MPC · JPL
470788	2008 UR_{313}	—	October 30, 2008	Catalina	CSS	H	600 m	MPC · JPL
470789	2008 UT_{315}	—	September 24, 2008	Mount Lemmon	Mount Lemmon Survey	MIS	2.6 km	MPC · JPL
470790	2008 UO_{322}	—	October 31, 2008	Mount Lemmon	Mount Lemmon Survey	JUN	1.0 km	MPC · JPL
470791	2008 UP_{324}	—	October 31, 2008	Kitt Peak	Spacewatch	JUN	980 m	MPC · JPL
470792	2008 UD_{343}	—	October 21, 2008	Kitt Peak	Spacewatch	·	2.1 km	MPC · JPL
470793	2008 UE_{343}	—	October 22, 2008	Kitt Peak	Spacewatch	·	2.0 km	MPC · JPL
470794	2008 UY_{347}	—	October 23, 2008	Kitt Peak	Spacewatch	·	2.3 km	MPC · JPL
470795	2008 UU_{350}	—	October 28, 2008	Kitt Peak	Spacewatch	·	1.5 km	MPC · JPL
470796	2008 UR_{357}	—	October 24, 2008	Catalina	CSS	RAF	1.0 km	MPC · JPL
470797	2008 UV_{359}	—	October 28, 2008	Kitt Peak	Spacewatch	·	2.0 km	MPC · JPL
470798	2008 UJ_{361}	—	September 25, 2008	Mount Lemmon	Mount Lemmon Survey	EUN	1.1 km	MPC · JPL
470799	2008 UV_{365}	—	October 28, 2008	Kitt Peak	Spacewatch	·	1.5 km	MPC · JPL
470800	2008 UW_{369}	—	October 31, 2008	Catalina	CSS	·	2.0 km	MPC · JPL

== 470801–470900 ==
back to top

Designation			Discovery			Properties		Ref
Permanent	Provisional	Named after	Date	Site	Discoverer(s)	Category	Diam.	Ref
470801	2008 VG_{1}	—	September 5, 2008	Socorro	LINEAR	·	3.5 km	MPC · JPL
470802	2008 VS_{1}	—	September 6, 2008	Mount Lemmon	Mount Lemmon Survey	·	1.6 km	MPC · JPL
470803	2008 VA_{2}	—	November 2, 2008	Socorro	LINEAR	·	1.5 km	MPC · JPL
470804	2008 VJ_{2}	—	October 20, 2008	Kitt Peak	Spacewatch	EUN	1.5 km	MPC · JPL
470805	2008 VY_{2}	—	July 29, 2008	Mount Lemmon	Mount Lemmon Survey	·	1.5 km	MPC · JPL
470806	2008 VZ_{2}	—	October 25, 2008	Kitt Peak	Spacewatch	·	1.7 km	MPC · JPL
470807	2008 VC_{5}	—	November 6, 2008	Socorro	LINEAR	H	640 m	MPC · JPL
470808	2008 VF_{14}	—	July 29, 2008	Mount Lemmon	Mount Lemmon Survey	·	1.9 km	MPC · JPL
470809	2008 VE_{16}	—	October 1, 2008	Mount Lemmon	Mount Lemmon Survey	·	1.7 km	MPC · JPL
470810	2008 VR_{18}	—	October 6, 2008	Mount Lemmon	Mount Lemmon Survey	·	1.7 km	MPC · JPL
470811	2008 VE_{38}	—	September 25, 2008	Mount Lemmon	Mount Lemmon Survey	H	630 m	MPC · JPL
470812	2008 VK_{45}	—	November 3, 2008	Mount Lemmon	Mount Lemmon Survey	·	1.4 km	MPC · JPL
470813	2008 VW_{49}	—	November 4, 2008	Kitt Peak	Spacewatch	·	990 m	MPC · JPL
470814	2008 VV_{64}	—	November 2, 2008	Mount Lemmon	Mount Lemmon Survey	(5)	1.2 km	MPC · JPL
470815	2008 VM_{67}	—	November 7, 2008	Mount Lemmon	Mount Lemmon Survey	·	1.4 km	MPC · JPL
470816	2008 VF_{73}	—	November 2, 2008	Mount Lemmon	Mount Lemmon Survey	·	2.2 km	MPC · JPL
470817	2008 WD_{7}	—	October 27, 2008	Kitt Peak	Spacewatch	·	1.2 km	MPC · JPL
470818	2008 WV_{12}	—	November 18, 2008	Bisei SG Center	BATTeRS	·	1.2 km	MPC · JPL
470819	2008 WN_{23}	—	November 18, 2008	Catalina	CSS	MIS	2.1 km	MPC · JPL
470820	2008 WN_{34}	—	October 23, 2008	Kitt Peak	Spacewatch	·	1.3 km	MPC · JPL
470821	2008 WT_{44}	—	November 17, 2008	Kitt Peak	Spacewatch	·	1.9 km	MPC · JPL
470822	2008 WP_{59}	—	October 3, 2008	Mount Lemmon	Mount Lemmon Survey	(1547)	1.6 km	MPC · JPL
470823	2008 WQ_{59}	—	November 1, 2008	Mount Lemmon	Mount Lemmon Survey	·	1.5 km	MPC · JPL
470824	2008 WB_{64}	—	October 3, 2008	Mount Lemmon	Mount Lemmon Survey	·	1.1 km	MPC · JPL
470825	2008 WF_{65}	—	September 24, 2008	Mount Lemmon	Mount Lemmon Survey	·	1.3 km	MPC · JPL
470826	2008 WA_{68}	—	November 6, 2008	Mount Lemmon	Mount Lemmon Survey	·	2.7 km	MPC · JPL
470827	2008 WC_{69}	—	November 18, 2008	Kitt Peak	Spacewatch	·	3.3 km	MPC · JPL
470828	2008 WO_{69}	—	November 18, 2008	Kitt Peak	Spacewatch	·	2.1 km	MPC · JPL
470829	2008 WY_{74}	—	September 29, 2008	Kitt Peak	Spacewatch	·	1.6 km	MPC · JPL
470830	2008 WB_{83}	—	November 7, 2008	Mount Lemmon	Mount Lemmon Survey	·	2.1 km	MPC · JPL
470831	2008 WO_{94}	—	November 1, 2008	Mount Lemmon	Mount Lemmon Survey	·	1.5 km	MPC · JPL
470832	2008 WW_{107}	—	November 24, 2008	Kitt Peak	Spacewatch	·	1.8 km	MPC · JPL
470833	2008 WO_{108}	—	September 25, 2008	Mount Lemmon	Mount Lemmon Survey	·	830 m	MPC · JPL
470834	2008 WR_{109}	—	November 17, 2008	Kitt Peak	Spacewatch	·	1.5 km	MPC · JPL
470835	2008 WA_{115}	—	November 30, 2008	Kitt Peak	Spacewatch	·	1.4 km	MPC · JPL
470836	2008 WT_{115}	—	November 18, 2008	Kitt Peak	Spacewatch	·	1.3 km	MPC · JPL
470837	2008 WF_{136}	—	November 19, 2008	Kitt Peak	Spacewatch	ADE	2.0 km	MPC · JPL
470838	2008 XN_{1}	—	November 24, 2008	Kitt Peak	Spacewatch	MAR	1.5 km	MPC · JPL
470839	2008 XV_{5}	—	December 4, 2008	Socorro	LINEAR	·	2.1 km	MPC · JPL
470840	2008 XA_{11}	—	November 7, 2008	Mount Lemmon	Mount Lemmon Survey	·	1.5 km	MPC · JPL
470841	2008 XJ_{13}	—	November 2, 2008	Kitt Peak	Spacewatch	·	1.0 km	MPC · JPL
470842	2008 XM_{21}	—	November 23, 2008	Kitt Peak	Spacewatch	·	1.9 km	MPC · JPL
470843	2008 XD_{33}	—	December 2, 2008	Kitt Peak	Spacewatch	·	1.7 km	MPC · JPL
470844	2008 XZ_{51}	—	December 4, 2008	Catalina	CSS	·	2.0 km	MPC · JPL
470845	2008 XE_{54}	—	December 1, 2008	Socorro	LINEAR	·	4.3 km	MPC · JPL
470846	2008 XB_{55}	—	December 6, 2008	Socorro	LINEAR	·	1.0 km	MPC · JPL
470847	2008 YY_{9}	—	November 8, 2008	Mount Lemmon	Mount Lemmon Survey	EOS	2.5 km	MPC · JPL
470848	2008 YH_{12}	—	November 20, 2008	Kitt Peak	Spacewatch	·	2.3 km	MPC · JPL
470849	2008 YS_{18}	—	December 21, 2008	Kitt Peak	Spacewatch	·	2.2 km	MPC · JPL
470850	2008 YH_{40}	—	December 4, 2008	Mount Lemmon	Mount Lemmon Survey	·	2.0 km	MPC · JPL
470851	2008 YO_{42}	—	December 6, 2008	Kitt Peak	Spacewatch	·	2.9 km	MPC · JPL
470852	2008 YY_{47}	—	November 20, 2008	Mount Lemmon	Mount Lemmon Survey	·	3.3 km	MPC · JPL
470853	2008 YX_{49}	—	September 5, 2007	Catalina	CSS	EUN	1.3 km	MPC · JPL
470854	2008 YX_{52}	—	December 29, 2008	Mount Lemmon	Mount Lemmon Survey	·	2.9 km	MPC · JPL
470855	2008 YW_{53}	—	December 29, 2008	Mount Lemmon	Mount Lemmon Survey	·	1.9 km	MPC · JPL
470856	2008 YX_{53}	—	December 29, 2008	Mount Lemmon	Mount Lemmon Survey	·	1.3 km	MPC · JPL
470857	2008 YM_{73}	—	December 30, 2008	Kitt Peak	Spacewatch	·	1.3 km	MPC · JPL
470858	2008 YE_{96}	—	December 29, 2008	Mount Lemmon	Mount Lemmon Survey	·	1.1 km	MPC · JPL
470859	2008 YV_{106}	—	December 29, 2008	Kitt Peak	Spacewatch	·	4.8 km	MPC · JPL
470860	2008 YT_{107}	—	December 29, 2008	Kitt Peak	Spacewatch	·	1.6 km	MPC · JPL
470861	2008 YH_{114}	—	December 29, 2008	Kitt Peak	Spacewatch	·	1.7 km	MPC · JPL
470862	2008 YW_{142}	—	December 30, 2008	Kitt Peak	Spacewatch	·	2.2 km	MPC · JPL
470863	2008 YX_{144}	—	December 30, 2008	Kitt Peak	Spacewatch	·	2.3 km	MPC · JPL
470864	2008 YV_{148}	—	December 21, 2008	Mount Lemmon	Mount Lemmon Survey	AMO	270 m	MPC · JPL
470865	2008 YK_{156}	—	December 29, 2008	Mount Lemmon	Mount Lemmon Survey	·	1.5 km	MPC · JPL
470866	2008 YK_{158}	—	December 31, 2008	Mount Lemmon	Mount Lemmon Survey	(32418)	1.9 km	MPC · JPL
470867	2008 YU_{158}	—	December 30, 2008	Mount Lemmon	Mount Lemmon Survey	T_{j} (2.96)	3.0 km	MPC · JPL
470868	2008 YX_{166}	—	December 21, 2008	Socorro	LINEAR	·	1.4 km	MPC · JPL
470869	2009 AT_{13}	—	December 22, 2008	Kitt Peak	Spacewatch	·	1.7 km	MPC · JPL
470870	2009 AG_{24}	—	January 3, 2009	Kitt Peak	Spacewatch	·	1.2 km	MPC · JPL
470871	2009 AO_{27}	—	January 2, 2009	Kitt Peak	Spacewatch	·	3.5 km	MPC · JPL
470872	2009 AY_{32}	—	December 29, 2008	Mount Lemmon	Mount Lemmon Survey	THB	2.4 km	MPC · JPL
470873	2009 AR_{43}	—	January 2, 2009	Kitt Peak	Spacewatch	·	1.9 km	MPC · JPL
470874	2009 AQ_{46}	—	January 3, 2009	Mount Lemmon	Mount Lemmon Survey	·	2.4 km	MPC · JPL
470875	2009 BX_{11}	—	September 28, 2008	Kitt Peak	Spacewatch	JUN	1.3 km	MPC · JPL
470876	2009 BG_{28}	—	October 10, 1993	Kitt Peak	Spacewatch	AGN	960 m	MPC · JPL
470877	2009 BP_{28}	—	December 29, 2008	Kitt Peak	Spacewatch	·	1.8 km	MPC · JPL
470878	2009 BK_{30}	—	January 3, 2009	Kitt Peak	Spacewatch	·	3.1 km	MPC · JPL
470879	2009 BP_{36}	—	December 30, 2008	Mount Lemmon	Mount Lemmon Survey	·	3.2 km	MPC · JPL
470880	2009 BC_{45}	—	January 16, 2009	Kitt Peak	Spacewatch	·	2.0 km	MPC · JPL
470881	2009 BG_{45}	—	January 16, 2009	Kitt Peak	Spacewatch	EOS	1.5 km	MPC · JPL
470882	2009 BE_{46}	—	January 16, 2009	Kitt Peak	Spacewatch	·	2.9 km	MPC · JPL
470883	2009 BT_{50}	—	December 22, 2008	Mount Lemmon	Mount Lemmon Survey	·	2.3 km	MPC · JPL
470884	2009 BC_{55}	—	January 1, 2009	Mount Lemmon	Mount Lemmon Survey	·	1.8 km	MPC · JPL
470885	2009 BR_{57}	—	December 22, 2008	Mount Lemmon	Mount Lemmon Survey	·	3.1 km	MPC · JPL
470886	2009 BS_{68}	—	January 25, 2009	Kitt Peak	Spacewatch	·	1.8 km	MPC · JPL
470887	2009 BS_{89}	—	December 30, 2008	Mount Lemmon	Mount Lemmon Survey	·	2.6 km	MPC · JPL
470888	2009 BV_{120}	—	January 20, 2009	Mount Lemmon	Mount Lemmon Survey	·	3.3 km	MPC · JPL
470889	2009 BN_{138}	—	January 15, 2009	Kitt Peak	Spacewatch	·	1.7 km	MPC · JPL
470890	2009 BE_{143}	—	January 30, 2009	Kitt Peak	Spacewatch	NAE	2.8 km	MPC · JPL
470891	2009 BX_{165}	—	January 31, 2009	Kitt Peak	Spacewatch	·	2.0 km	MPC · JPL
470892	2009 BH_{166}	—	January 20, 2009	Kitt Peak	Spacewatch	·	2.3 km	MPC · JPL
470893	2009 BQ_{175}	—	January 29, 2009	Mount Lemmon	Mount Lemmon Survey	·	1.9 km	MPC · JPL
470894	2009 BT_{187}	—	January 31, 2009	Mount Lemmon	Mount Lemmon Survey	·	3.3 km	MPC · JPL
470895	2009 BL_{189}	—	January 18, 2009	Catalina	CSS	·	1.8 km	MPC · JPL
470896	2009 CR_{11}	—	April 9, 1999	Kitt Peak	Spacewatch	·	1.6 km	MPC · JPL
470897	2009 CO_{16}	—	February 1, 2009	Mount Lemmon	Mount Lemmon Survey	·	1.4 km	MPC · JPL
470898	2009 CM_{23}	—	February 1, 2009	Kitt Peak	Spacewatch	·	1.6 km	MPC · JPL
470899	2009 CH_{36}	—	January 2, 2009	Kitt Peak	Spacewatch	·	2.6 km	MPC · JPL
470900	2009 CA_{42}	—	January 1, 2009	Kitt Peak	Spacewatch	EOS	1.9 km	MPC · JPL

== 470901–471000 ==
back to top

Designation			Discovery			Properties		Ref
Permanent	Provisional	Named after	Date	Site	Discoverer(s)	Category	Diam.	Ref
470901	2009 CF_{47}	—	February 14, 2009	Kitt Peak	Spacewatch	·	1.8 km	MPC · JPL
470902	2009 CD_{49}	—	September 14, 2007	Kitt Peak	Spacewatch	HOF	2.4 km	MPC · JPL
470903	2009 CH_{49}	—	February 14, 2009	Mount Lemmon	Mount Lemmon Survey	·	4.0 km	MPC · JPL
470904	2009 CV_{52}	—	February 14, 2009	Mount Lemmon	Mount Lemmon Survey	·	2.4 km	MPC · JPL
470905	2009 CX_{57}	—	February 3, 2009	Kitt Peak	Spacewatch	·	2.2 km	MPC · JPL
470906	2009 CQ_{58}	—	February 4, 2009	Mount Lemmon	Mount Lemmon Survey	·	2.1 km	MPC · JPL
470907	2009 CQ_{60}	—	February 5, 2009	Kitt Peak	Spacewatch	·	2.1 km	MPC · JPL
470908	2009 DB_{44}	—	November 11, 2007	Mount Lemmon	Mount Lemmon Survey	KOR	1.2 km	MPC · JPL
470909	2009 DK_{46}	—	February 28, 2009	Kitt Peak	Spacewatch	AMO	780 m	MPC · JPL
470910	2009 DH_{48}	—	February 27, 2009	Catalina	CSS	·	2.4 km	MPC · JPL
470911	2009 DF_{52}	—	February 22, 2009	Kitt Peak	Spacewatch	·	1.9 km	MPC · JPL
470912	2009 DH_{72}	—	February 21, 2009	Kitt Peak	Spacewatch	TIR	2.2 km	MPC · JPL
470913	2009 DK_{78}	—	January 17, 2009	Kitt Peak	Spacewatch	·	1.9 km	MPC · JPL
470914	2009 DN_{80}	—	February 13, 2009	Kitt Peak	Spacewatch	·	3.9 km	MPC · JPL
470915	2009 DT_{88}	—	February 22, 2009	Kitt Peak	Spacewatch	·	2.6 km	MPC · JPL
470916	2009 DE_{92}	—	January 31, 2009	Mount Lemmon	Mount Lemmon Survey	·	2.9 km	MPC · JPL
470917	2009 DN_{97}	—	February 22, 2009	Kitt Peak	Spacewatch	·	2.6 km	MPC · JPL
470918	2009 DA_{101}	—	October 3, 2006	Kitt Peak	Spacewatch	·	2.4 km	MPC · JPL
470919	2009 DD_{102}	—	February 22, 2009	Kitt Peak	Spacewatch	EOS	1.8 km	MPC · JPL
470920	2009 DG_{105}	—	February 26, 2009	Kitt Peak	Spacewatch	EOS	1.8 km	MPC · JPL
470921	2009 DG_{130}	—	February 28, 2009	Kitt Peak	Spacewatch	·	3.9 km	MPC · JPL
470922	2009 DQ_{132}	—	February 3, 2009	Kitt Peak	Spacewatch	EOS	1.6 km	MPC · JPL
470923	2009 EE_{5}	—	March 1, 2009	Mount Lemmon	Mount Lemmon Survey	·	2.8 km	MPC · JPL
470924	2009 EY_{24}	—	February 19, 2009	Kitt Peak	Spacewatch	·	2.6 km	MPC · JPL
470925	2009 EO_{28}	—	March 2, 2009	Mount Lemmon	Mount Lemmon Survey	·	4.0 km	MPC · JPL
470926	2009 EF_{31}	—	March 3, 2009	Catalina	CSS	·	2.7 km	MPC · JPL
470927	2009 FZ	—	March 16, 2009	La Sagra	OAM	·	3.4 km	MPC · JPL
470928	2009 FM_{2}	—	March 17, 2009	La Sagra	OAM	·	3.1 km	MPC · JPL
470929	2009 FR_{13}	—	February 27, 2009	Kitt Peak	Spacewatch	·	720 m	MPC · JPL
470930	2009 FP_{26}	—	March 17, 2009	Kitt Peak	Spacewatch	·	3.0 km	MPC · JPL
470931	2009 FZ_{41}	—	March 1, 2009	Kitt Peak	Spacewatch	·	2.4 km	MPC · JPL
470932	2009 FN_{50}	—	March 21, 2004	Kitt Peak	Spacewatch	·	2.3 km	MPC · JPL
470933	2009 FY_{67}	—	March 31, 2009	Kitt Peak	Spacewatch	·	3.3 km	MPC · JPL
470934	2009 HS_{4}	—	March 27, 2009	Kitt Peak	Spacewatch	·	3.3 km	MPC · JPL
470935	2009 HA_{7}	—	August 30, 2005	Kitt Peak	Spacewatch	·	2.1 km	MPC · JPL
470936	2009 HJ_{12}	—	February 9, 2008	Mount Lemmon	Mount Lemmon Survey	·	2.9 km	MPC · JPL
470937	2009 HY_{37}	—	March 24, 2009	Mount Lemmon	Mount Lemmon Survey	·	2.6 km	MPC · JPL
470938	2009 HH_{63}	—	April 22, 2009	Mount Lemmon	Mount Lemmon Survey	·	490 m	MPC · JPL
470939	2009 HA_{64}	—	April 22, 2009	Mount Lemmon	Mount Lemmon Survey	·	2.5 km	MPC · JPL
470940	2009 HE_{71}	—	April 22, 2009	Mount Lemmon	Mount Lemmon Survey	·	3.1 km	MPC · JPL
470941	2009 HO_{92}	—	April 26, 2009	Kitt Peak	Spacewatch	·	550 m	MPC · JPL
470942	2009 HV_{98}	—	April 27, 2009	Kitt Peak	Spacewatch	·	690 m	MPC · JPL
470943	2009 HY_{100}	—	April 30, 2009	Kitt Peak	Spacewatch	·	5.1 km	MPC · JPL
470944	2009 HA_{103}	—	April 17, 2009	Kitt Peak	Spacewatch	(31811)	3.8 km	MPC · JPL
470945	2009 HN_{106}	—	April 26, 2009	Siding Spring	SSS	·	610 m	MPC · JPL
470946	2009 HS_{106}	—	April 21, 2009	Mount Lemmon	Mount Lemmon Survey	·	670 m	MPC · JPL
470947	2009 KE_{12}	—	April 26, 2009	Kitt Peak	Spacewatch	·	880 m	MPC · JPL
470948	2009 KW_{12}	—	April 18, 2009	Mount Lemmon	Mount Lemmon Survey	·	3.0 km	MPC · JPL
470949	2009 KD_{30}	—	May 26, 2009	Kitt Peak	Spacewatch	·	2.6 km	MPC · JPL
470950	2009 KO_{37}	—	April 27, 2009	Catalina	CSS	·	720 m	MPC · JPL
470951	2009 LS	—	June 12, 2009	Catalina	CSS	APO +1km	900 m	MPC · JPL
470952	2009 OM_{10}	—	July 1, 2009	Siding Spring	SSS	·	820 m	MPC · JPL
470953	2009 OT_{10}	—	July 27, 2009	Catalina	CSS	T_{j} (2.96) · 3:2	5.7 km	MPC · JPL
470954	2009 PQ_{5}	—	July 27, 2009	Catalina	CSS	·	930 m	MPC · JPL
470955	2009 PQ_{17}	—	August 1, 2009	Kitt Peak	Spacewatch	·	690 m	MPC · JPL
470956	2009 PC_{20}	—	August 15, 2009	Kitt Peak	Spacewatch	·	810 m	MPC · JPL
470957	2009 PL_{20}	—	August 15, 2009	Kitt Peak	Spacewatch	·	760 m	MPC · JPL
470958	2009 QP_{1}	—	August 16, 2009	Tzec Maun	Tozzi, F.	·	880 m	MPC · JPL
470959	2009 QM_{12}	—	August 16, 2009	Kitt Peak	Spacewatch	·	810 m	MPC · JPL
470960	2009 QU_{13}	—	August 16, 2009	Kitt Peak	Spacewatch	·	1.0 km	MPC · JPL
470961	2009 QG_{15}	—	August 16, 2009	Kitt Peak	Spacewatch	·	990 m	MPC · JPL
470962	2009 QZ_{24}	—	August 17, 2009	La Sagra	OAM	·	540 m	MPC · JPL
470963	2009 QB_{25}	—	June 19, 2009	Kitt Peak	Spacewatch	·	710 m	MPC · JPL
470964	2009 QU_{33}	—	August 27, 2009	Plana	Fratev, F.	·	690 m	MPC · JPL
470965	2009 QL_{40}	—	August 15, 2009	Kitt Peak	Spacewatch	NYS	880 m	MPC · JPL
470966	2009 QQ_{49}	—	August 28, 2009	Kitt Peak	Spacewatch	KOR	1.3 km	MPC · JPL
470967	2009 RF_{16}	—	September 12, 2009	Kitt Peak	Spacewatch	·	780 m	MPC · JPL
470968	2009 RE_{29}	—	September 14, 2009	Kitt Peak	Spacewatch	·	930 m	MPC · JPL
470969	2009 RJ_{33}	—	September 14, 2009	Kitt Peak	Spacewatch	NYS	970 m	MPC · JPL
470970	2009 RE_{35}	—	September 14, 2009	Kitt Peak	Spacewatch	·	1.1 km	MPC · JPL
470971	2009 RR_{41}	—	September 15, 2009	Kitt Peak	Spacewatch	·	830 m	MPC · JPL
470972	2009 RJ_{48}	—	September 15, 2009	Kitt Peak	Spacewatch	MAS	620 m	MPC · JPL
470973	2009 RL_{48}	—	September 15, 2009	Kitt Peak	Spacewatch	·	1.1 km	MPC · JPL
470974	2009 RS_{65}	—	September 15, 2009	Kitt Peak	Spacewatch	·	740 m	MPC · JPL
470975	2009 SC_{15}	—	September 19, 2009	Mount Lemmon	Mount Lemmon Survey	AMO	180 m	MPC · JPL
470976	2009 SU_{17}	—	September 17, 2009	La Sagra	OAM	·	920 m	MPC · JPL
470977	2009 SJ_{22}	—	September 16, 2009	Kitt Peak	Spacewatch	H	510 m	MPC · JPL
470978	2009 SD_{29}	—	September 16, 2009	Kitt Peak	Spacewatch	·	1.2 km	MPC · JPL
470979	2009 SG_{56}	—	September 17, 2009	Kitt Peak	Spacewatch	PHO	670 m	MPC · JPL
470980	2009 SN_{56}	—	September 17, 2009	Kitt Peak	Spacewatch	V	610 m	MPC · JPL
470981	2009 SM_{57}	—	September 17, 2009	Kitt Peak	Spacewatch	·	1.5 km	MPC · JPL
470982	2009 SS_{57}	—	September 17, 2009	Kitt Peak	Spacewatch	·	970 m	MPC · JPL
470983	2009 ST_{58}	—	September 17, 2009	Kitt Peak	Spacewatch	V	770 m	MPC · JPL
470984	2009 SV_{58}	—	September 17, 2009	Kitt Peak	Spacewatch	·	1.1 km	MPC · JPL
470985	2009 SL_{59}	—	September 17, 2009	Kitt Peak	Spacewatch	V	630 m	MPC · JPL
470986	2009 SS_{71}	—	September 17, 2009	Mount Lemmon	Mount Lemmon Survey	·	700 m	MPC · JPL
470987	2009 SV_{82}	—	September 18, 2009	Kitt Peak	Spacewatch	·	900 m	MPC · JPL
470988	2009 SG_{99}	—	September 22, 2009	Dauban	Kugel, F.	NYS	860 m	MPC · JPL
470989	2009 SW_{103}	—	September 25, 2009	Mayhill	D. Chestnov, A. Novichonok	·	810 m	MPC · JPL
470990	2009 SU_{108}	—	August 18, 2009	Catalina	CSS	·	1.2 km	MPC · JPL
470991	2009 SH_{126}	—	September 18, 2009	Kitt Peak	Spacewatch	·	940 m	MPC · JPL
470992	2009 SB_{128}	—	September 18, 2009	Kitt Peak	Spacewatch	3:2	5.5 km	MPC · JPL
470993	2009 SE_{129}	—	June 28, 1998	Kitt Peak	Spacewatch	·	1.1 km	MPC · JPL
470994	2009 SY_{129}	—	September 18, 2009	Kitt Peak	Spacewatch	V	450 m	MPC · JPL
470995	2009 SK_{130}	—	September 18, 2009	Kitt Peak	Spacewatch	·	1.7 km	MPC · JPL
470996	2009 SW_{137}	—	September 18, 2009	Kitt Peak	Spacewatch	·	1.3 km	MPC · JPL
470997	2009 SK_{139}	—	September 19, 2009	Kitt Peak	Spacewatch	·	980 m	MPC · JPL
470998	2009 SX_{142}	—	September 19, 2009	Kitt Peak	Spacewatch	MAS	680 m	MPC · JPL
470999	2009 SU_{147}	—	March 20, 2004	Anderson Mesa	LONEOS	·	1.5 km	MPC · JPL
471000	2009 SE_{164}	—	September 21, 2009	Kitt Peak	Spacewatch	·	1.1 km	MPC · JPL

back to top

== Meaning of names ==
As minor planet discoveries are confirmed, they are given a permanent number by the IAU's Minor Planet Center (MPC), and the discoverers can then submit names for them, following the IAU's naming conventions. The list below concerns those minor planets in the specified number-range that have received names, and explains the meanings of those names.

Official naming citations of newly named small Solar System bodies are approved and published in a bulletin by IAU's Working Group for Small Bodies Nomenclature (WGSBN). Before May 2021, citations were published in MPC's Minor Planet Circulars for many decades. Recent citations can also be found on the JPL Small-Body Database (SBDB). Until his death in 2016, German astronomer Lutz D. Schmadel compiled these citations into the Dictionary of Minor Planet Names (DMP) and regularly updated the collection.

Based on Paul Herget's The Names of the Minor Planets, Schmadel also researched the unclear origin of numerous asteroids, most of which had been named prior to World War II. This article incorporates text from this source, which is in the public domain: SBDB New namings may only be added to this list below after official publication as the preannouncement of names is condemned. The WGSBN publishes a comprehensive guideline for the naming rules of non-cometary small Solar System bodies.

Named minor planet	Provisional	This minor planet was named for...	Ref · Catalog
470324 Debbanci	2007 QX_{3}	Debora Banci (b. 1970), an Italian psychologist.	IAU · 470324
470341 Panjianwei	2007 RB_{119}	Pan Jianwei, academician of the Chinese Academy of Sciences.	IAU · 470341
470423 Endeavour	2007 VN_{185}	Endeavour means “to strive for” or “make an earnest attempt to achieve.” Both the US Apollo 15's Lunar Module and a Space Shuttle were named Endeavour and accomplished bold discoveries in their missions.	IAU · 470423
470600 Calogero	2008 PA_{7}	Calogero (Calogero Joseph Salvatore Maurici, born 1971) is a French singer and a songwriter and composer. His greatest hits include En apesanteur, Tien an men, Face à la mer and Un jour au mauvais endroit.	JPL · 470600
