= (470308) 2007 JH43 =

Trans-Neptunian object

(470308) 2007 JH_{43}
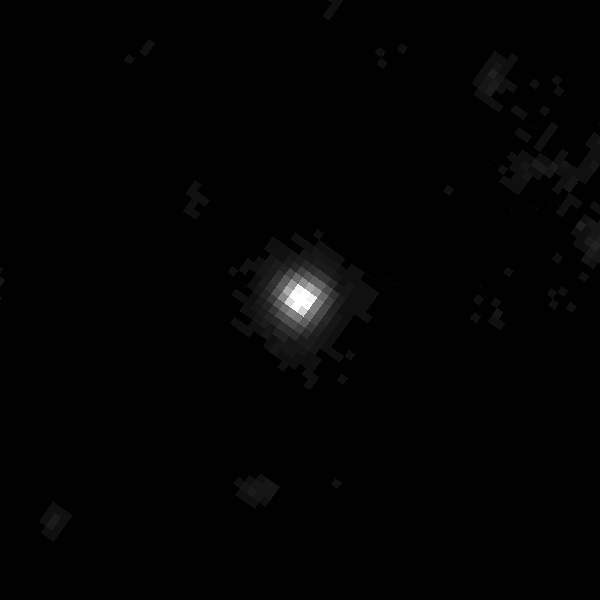
- 2007 JH_{43} photographed by the Hubble Space Telescope on 26 April 2026

Discovery
- Discovered by: M. E. Schwamb; M. E. Brown; D. L. Rabinowitz
- Discovery site: Palomar Obs.
- Discovery date: 10 May 2007

Designations
- Minor planet category: TNO; Scat-Near (DES)

Orbital characteristics
- Epoch 31 July 2016 (JD 2457600.5)
- Uncertainty parameter 3
- Observation arc: 31.34 yr (11,446 days)
- Earliest precovery date: 7 March 1984
- Aphelion: 40.566 AU (6.0686 Tm)
- Perihelion: 38.612 AU (5.7763 Tm)
- Semi-major axis: 39.589 AU (5.9224 Tm)
- Eccentricity: 0.0247
- Orbital period (sidereal): 249.10 yr (90,983 days)
- Mean anomaly: 177.14°
- Mean motion: 0° 0^{m} 14.4^{s} / day
- Inclination: 18.129°
- Longitude of ascending node: 64.584°
- Argument of perihelion: 4.7053°
- Known satellites: 0

Physical characteristics
- Mean diameter: 531 km (assumed); 604.77 km (assumed); 530 km (assumed)
- Geometric albedo: 0.079 (assumed); 0.057 (assumed); 0.08 (assumed)
- Spectral type: C
- Absolute magnitude (H): 4.49±0.05 (S); 4.82

(470308) 2007 JH_{43} is a trans-Neptunian object in the outer regions of the Solar System, approximately 500 to 600 kilometers (310 to 370 mi) in diameter. It was discovered on 10 May 2007, by Megan E. Schwamb, Michael E. Brown and David L. Rabinowitz at Palomar Observatory in California, United States.

The minor planet orbits the Sun at a distance of 38.6–40.6 AU once every 249 years and 1 month (90,983 days). Its orbit has an eccentricity of 0.02 and an inclination of 18° with respect to the ecliptic. The first precovery was taken at the Australian Siding Spring Observatory during the Digitized Sky Survey in March 1984, extending the body's observation arc by 23 years prior to its discovery observation. It came to perihelion around 1888.

The Hubble Space Telescope photographed 2007 JH_{43} on 26 April 2026, during a search for moons around large trans-Neptunian objects.

== Physical characteristics ==
=== Diameter and albedo ===
2007 JH_{43} has estimated diameters of 531 kilometers (330 mi), 604.77 kilometers (375.79 mi), and 530 kilometers (330 mi). assuming an albedo of 0.074, 0.057, 0.08. respectively.

=== Rotation period ===
As of 2026, no rotational lightcurve of this object has been obtained from photometric observations. The object's rotation period, pole and shape remain unknown. In 2013, Benecchi and colleagues put an upper bound of 0.08 mag on its lightcurve amplitude.

=== Surface and spectra ===
2007 JH_{43} has known color indices of: g′-r′ of 0.68 ± 0.04; g′-i′ of 1.09 ± 0.03; and r′-i′ of 0.41 ± 0.03. It is also a C-type asteroid. It has assumed albedos of: 0.074, 0.057, and 0.08.

== Orbital classification ==
The Minor Planet Center lists 2007 JH_{43} as a trans-Neptunian object or a distant object in the Kuiper belt. The Deep Ecliptic Survey currently shows it as a scattered object, based on a 10-million-year integration of the orbit.

Rotating frame animation of 2007 JH_{43}'s orbit (red) compared to Pluto (grey), with Neptune kept stationary

2007 JH_{43} moving against a field of stars, as seen by the Hubble Space Telescope on 26 April 2026.
