= List of minor planets: 296001–297000 =

The following is a partial list of minor planets, running from minor-planet number 296001 through 297000, inclusive. The primary data for this and other partial lists is based on JPL's "Small-Body Orbital Elements" and data available from the Minor Planet Center. Critical list information is also provided by the MPC, unless otherwise specified from Lowell Observatory. A detailed description of the table's columns and additional sources are given on the main page including a complete list of every page in this series, and a statistical break-up on the dynamical classification of minor planets.

Also see the summary list of all named bodies in numerical and alphabetical order, and the corresponding naming citations for the number range of this particular list. New namings may only be added to this list after official publication, as the preannouncement of names is condemned by the Working Group for Small Bodies Nomenclature of the International Astronomical Union.

| Near-Earth obj. | MBA (inner) | MBA (outer) | Centaur |
| Mars-crosser | MBA (middle) | Jupiter trojan | Trans-Neptunian obj. |
| Unclassified |

== 296001–296100 ==
| Designation | | | Discovery | | | Properties | | Ref |
| Permanent | Provisional | Named after | Date | Site | Discoverer(s) | Category | Diam. | Ref |
|---|---|---|---|---|---|---|---|---|
| 296001 | 2008 YO_{97} | — | December 29, 2008 | Mount Lemmon | Mount Lemmon Survey | KOR | 1.4 km | MPC · JPL |
| 296002 | 2008 YO_{101} | — | December 29, 2008 | Kitt Peak | Spacewatch | · | 1.5 km | MPC · JPL |
| 296003 | 2008 YU_{101} | — | December 29, 2008 | Kitt Peak | Spacewatch | · | 1.4 km | MPC · JPL |
| 296004 | 2008 YA_{103} | — | December 29, 2008 | Kitt Peak | Spacewatch | · | 2.1 km | MPC · JPL |
| 296005 | 2008 YU_{108} | — | December 29, 2008 | Kitt Peak | Spacewatch | · | 1.2 km | MPC · JPL |
| 296006 | 2008 YL_{109} | — | December 29, 2008 | Kitt Peak | Spacewatch | AGN | 1.6 km | MPC · JPL |
| 296007 | 2008 YM_{117} | — | December 29, 2008 | Kitt Peak | Spacewatch | · | 1.5 km | MPC · JPL |
| 296008 | 2008 YE_{118} | — | December 29, 2008 | Mount Lemmon | Mount Lemmon Survey | · | 1.1 km | MPC · JPL |
| 296009 | 2008 YW_{118} | — | December 29, 2008 | Kitt Peak | Spacewatch | · | 3.8 km | MPC · JPL |
| 296010 | 2008 YT_{121} | — | December 30, 2008 | Kitt Peak | Spacewatch | · | 2.8 km | MPC · JPL |
| 296011 | 2008 YK_{123} | — | December 30, 2008 | Kitt Peak | Spacewatch | · | 2.2 km | MPC · JPL |
| 296012 | 2008 YO_{123} | — | December 30, 2008 | Kitt Peak | Spacewatch | · | 2.1 km | MPC · JPL |
| 296013 | 2008 YW_{123} | — | December 30, 2008 | Kitt Peak | Spacewatch | · | 1.4 km | MPC · JPL |
| 296014 | 2008 YR_{125} | — | December 30, 2008 | Kitt Peak | Spacewatch | · | 1.3 km | MPC · JPL |
| 296015 | 2008 YY_{125} | — | December 30, 2008 | Kitt Peak | Spacewatch | EUN | 1.8 km | MPC · JPL |
| 296016 | 2008 YM_{135} | — | December 30, 2008 | La Sagra | OAM | EUN | 1.8 km | MPC · JPL |
| 296017 | 2008 YN_{144} | — | December 30, 2008 | Kitt Peak | Spacewatch | EOS | 3.3 km | MPC · JPL |
| 296018 | 2008 YZ_{148} | — | December 31, 2008 | Kitt Peak | Spacewatch | · | 1.5 km | MPC · JPL |
| 296019 | 2008 YM_{149} | — | December 21, 2008 | Kitt Peak | Spacewatch | · | 1.8 km | MPC · JPL |
| 296020 | 2008 YF_{151} | — | December 22, 2008 | Kitt Peak | Spacewatch | KOR | 1.5 km | MPC · JPL |
| 296021 | 2008 YS_{151} | — | December 22, 2008 | Mount Lemmon | Mount Lemmon Survey | · | 1.7 km | MPC · JPL |
| 296022 | 2008 YK_{153} | — | December 21, 2008 | Kitt Peak | Spacewatch | · | 1.5 km | MPC · JPL |
| 296023 | 2008 YJ_{154} | — | December 22, 2008 | Mount Lemmon | Mount Lemmon Survey | · | 1.2 km | MPC · JPL |
| 296024 | 2008 YZ_{154} | — | December 22, 2008 | Mount Lemmon | Mount Lemmon Survey | · | 1.0 km | MPC · JPL |
| 296025 | 2008 YR_{155} | — | December 22, 2008 | Kitt Peak | Spacewatch | KOR | 1.5 km | MPC · JPL |
| 296026 | 2008 YS_{155} | — | December 22, 2008 | Kitt Peak | Spacewatch | · | 1.5 km | MPC · JPL |
| 296027 | 2008 YG_{158} | — | December 31, 2008 | Kitt Peak | Spacewatch | LIX | 4.4 km | MPC · JPL |
| 296028 | 2008 YZ_{158} | — | December 30, 2008 | Mount Lemmon | Mount Lemmon Survey | KOR | 1.7 km | MPC · JPL |
| 296029 | 2008 YS_{160} | — | December 30, 2008 | Mount Lemmon | Mount Lemmon Survey | · | 3.8 km | MPC · JPL |
| 296030 | 2008 YR_{164} | — | December 22, 2008 | Mount Lemmon | Mount Lemmon Survey | · | 2.6 km | MPC · JPL |
| 296031 | 2008 YU_{166} | — | December 19, 2008 | Socorro | LINEAR | · | 2.2 km | MPC · JPL |
| 296032 | 2008 YV_{166} | — | December 19, 2008 | Socorro | LINEAR | · | 3.4 km | MPC · JPL |
| 296033 | 2008 YF_{167} | — | December 21, 2008 | Socorro | LINEAR | · | 2.0 km | MPC · JPL |
| 296034 | 2008 YS_{167} | — | December 22, 2008 | Kitt Peak | Spacewatch | · | 2.3 km | MPC · JPL |
| 296035 | 2008 YV_{167} | — | December 28, 2008 | Socorro | LINEAR | · | 1.4 km | MPC · JPL |
| 296036 | 2008 YV_{168} | — | December 21, 2008 | Kitt Peak | Spacewatch | · | 1.4 km | MPC · JPL |
| 296037 | 2008 YB_{172} | — | December 21, 2008 | Kitt Peak | Spacewatch | · | 1.5 km | MPC · JPL |
| 296038 | 2008 YC_{172} | — | December 22, 2008 | Mount Lemmon | Mount Lemmon Survey | · | 4.5 km | MPC · JPL |
| 296039 | 2009 AB | — | January 1, 2009 | Mayhill | Lowe, A. | · | 2.5 km | MPC · JPL |
| 296040 | 2009 AH_{2} | — | January 2, 2009 | Purple Mountain | PMO NEO Survey Program | AGN | 1.6 km | MPC · JPL |
| 296041 | 2009 AC_{6} | — | January 1, 2009 | Kitt Peak | Spacewatch | · | 2.0 km | MPC · JPL |
| 296042 | 2009 AW_{6} | — | January 1, 2009 | Kitt Peak | Spacewatch | · | 2.2 km | MPC · JPL |
| 296043 | 2009 AW_{11} | — | January 2, 2009 | Mount Lemmon | Mount Lemmon Survey | · | 1.4 km | MPC · JPL |
| 296044 | 2009 AA_{16} | — | January 15, 2009 | Socorro | LINEAR | EUN | 1.9 km | MPC · JPL |
| 296045 | 2009 AX_{18} | — | January 2, 2009 | Mount Lemmon | Mount Lemmon Survey | · | 3.6 km | MPC · JPL |
| 296046 | 2009 AC_{20} | — | January 2, 2009 | Mount Lemmon | Mount Lemmon Survey | · | 2.8 km | MPC · JPL |
| 296047 | 2009 AD_{21} | — | January 3, 2009 | Kitt Peak | Spacewatch | EOS · | 4.8 km | MPC · JPL |
| 296048 | 2009 AL_{23} | — | January 3, 2009 | Kitt Peak | Spacewatch | · | 770 m | MPC · JPL |
| 296049 | 2009 AV_{24} | — | January 3, 2009 | Kitt Peak | Spacewatch | · | 1.3 km | MPC · JPL |
| 296050 | 2009 AT_{26} | — | January 2, 2009 | Kitt Peak | Spacewatch | · | 1.8 km | MPC · JPL |
| 296051 | 2009 AM_{27} | — | January 2, 2009 | Kitt Peak | Spacewatch | THM | 2.5 km | MPC · JPL |
| 296052 | 2009 AG_{28} | — | January 8, 2009 | Kitt Peak | Spacewatch | · | 3.3 km | MPC · JPL |
| 296053 | 2009 AK_{28} | — | January 8, 2009 | Kitt Peak | Spacewatch | THM | 2.3 km | MPC · JPL |
| 296054 | 2009 AR_{29} | — | January 15, 2009 | Kitt Peak | Spacewatch | CYB | 3.6 km | MPC · JPL |
| 296055 | 2009 AW_{29} | — | January 15, 2009 | Kitt Peak | Spacewatch | · | 800 m | MPC · JPL |
| 296056 | 2009 AX_{30} | — | January 15, 2009 | Kitt Peak | Spacewatch | · | 4.0 km | MPC · JPL |
| 296057 | 2009 AH_{32} | — | January 15, 2009 | Kitt Peak | Spacewatch | · | 1.5 km | MPC · JPL |
| 296058 | 2009 AA_{33} | — | January 15, 2009 | Kitt Peak | Spacewatch | · | 3.4 km | MPC · JPL |
| 296059 | 2009 AD_{37} | — | January 15, 2009 | Kitt Peak | Spacewatch | V | 940 m | MPC · JPL |
| 296060 | 2009 AO_{38} | — | January 15, 2009 | Kitt Peak | Spacewatch | (29841) | 1.6 km | MPC · JPL |
| 296061 | 2009 AW_{40} | — | January 15, 2009 | Kitt Peak | Spacewatch | NYS | 1.6 km | MPC · JPL |
| 296062 | 2009 AC_{41} | — | January 15, 2009 | Kitt Peak | Spacewatch | MAS | 840 m | MPC · JPL |
| 296063 | 2009 AL_{42} | — | January 1, 2009 | Mount Lemmon | Mount Lemmon Survey | · | 1.8 km | MPC · JPL |
| 296064 | 2009 AN_{43} | — | January 15, 2009 | Kitt Peak | Spacewatch | · | 3.2 km | MPC · JPL |
| 296065 | 2009 AU_{43} | — | January 2, 2009 | Mount Lemmon | Mount Lemmon Survey | MRX | 1.2 km | MPC · JPL |
| 296066 | 2009 AN_{44} | — | January 7, 2009 | Kitt Peak | Spacewatch | · | 2.6 km | MPC · JPL |
| 296067 | 2009 AX_{44} | — | January 2, 2009 | Catalina | CSS | MAR | 1.6 km | MPC · JPL |
| 296068 | 2009 AA_{48} | — | January 1, 2009 | Kitt Peak | Spacewatch | · | 4.0 km | MPC · JPL |
| 296069 | 2009 AD_{50} | — | January 3, 2009 | Mount Lemmon | Mount Lemmon Survey | · | 2.1 km | MPC · JPL |
| 296070 | 2009 AE_{50} | — | January 1, 2009 | Kitt Peak | Spacewatch | V | 910 m | MPC · JPL |
| 296071 | 2009 AS_{50} | — | January 1, 2009 | Kitt Peak | Spacewatch | · | 1.6 km | MPC · JPL |
| 296072 | 2009 BK_{1} | — | January 17, 2009 | Mayhill | Lowe, A. | · | 3.0 km | MPC · JPL |
| 296073 | 2009 BP_{3} | — | January 18, 2009 | Socorro | LINEAR | · | 2.1 km | MPC · JPL |
| 296074 | 2009 BH_{4} | — | January 18, 2009 | Socorro | LINEAR | (5) | 1.6 km | MPC · JPL |
| 296075 | 2009 BL_{7} | — | January 18, 2009 | Socorro | LINEAR | EUN | 1.7 km | MPC · JPL |
| 296076 | 2009 BZ_{7} | — | January 22, 2009 | Sandlot | G. Hug | · | 4.1 km | MPC · JPL |
| 296077 | 2009 BN_{8} | — | January 17, 2009 | Socorro | LINEAR | PHO | 2.4 km | MPC · JPL |
| 296078 | 2009 BF_{9} | — | January 17, 2009 | Socorro | LINEAR | · | 2.2 km | MPC · JPL |
| 296079 | 2009 BE_{11} | — | January 24, 2009 | Purple Mountain | PMO NEO Survey Program | PHO | 1.5 km | MPC · JPL |
| 296080 | 2009 BA_{12} | — | January 21, 2009 | Socorro | LINEAR | TIR · | 5.3 km | MPC · JPL |
| 296081 | 2009 BB_{12} | — | January 21, 2009 | Socorro | LINEAR | ERI | 1.7 km | MPC · JPL |
| 296082 | 2009 BR_{13} | — | January 25, 2009 | Marly | P. Kocher | EOS | 3.0 km | MPC · JPL |
| 296083 | 2009 BT_{13} | — | January 27, 2009 | Socorro | LINEAR | · | 1.8 km | MPC · JPL |
| 296084 | 2009 BA_{14} | — | January 24, 2009 | Cerro Burek | Burek, Cerro | EMA | 6.0 km | MPC · JPL |
| 296085 | 2009 BB_{14} | — | January 24, 2009 | Cerro Burek | Burek, Cerro | · | 2.1 km | MPC · JPL |
| 296086 | 2009 BC_{16} | — | January 16, 2009 | Mount Lemmon | Mount Lemmon Survey | · | 1.6 km | MPC · JPL |
| 296087 | 2009 BL_{16} | — | January 16, 2009 | Mount Lemmon | Mount Lemmon Survey | · | 1.2 km | MPC · JPL |
| 296088 | 2009 BW_{16} | — | January 16, 2009 | Kitt Peak | Spacewatch | (5) | 1.5 km | MPC · JPL |
| 296089 | 2009 BK_{17} | — | January 17, 2009 | Kitt Peak | Spacewatch | · | 3.6 km | MPC · JPL |
| 296090 | 2009 BP_{20} | — | January 16, 2009 | Mount Lemmon | Mount Lemmon Survey | NYS | 1.3 km | MPC · JPL |
| 296091 | 2009 BF_{25} | — | January 18, 2009 | Catalina | CSS | · | 3.9 km | MPC · JPL |
| 296092 | 2009 BK_{29} | — | January 16, 2009 | Kitt Peak | Spacewatch | · | 1.8 km | MPC · JPL |
| 296093 | 2009 BD_{31} | — | January 16, 2009 | Kitt Peak | Spacewatch | HOF | 3.3 km | MPC · JPL |
| 296094 | 2009 BB_{32} | — | January 16, 2009 | Kitt Peak | Spacewatch | THM | 2.8 km | MPC · JPL |
| 296095 | 2009 BF_{34} | — | January 16, 2009 | Kitt Peak | Spacewatch | · | 1.3 km | MPC · JPL |
| 296096 | 2009 BL_{34} | — | January 16, 2009 | Kitt Peak | Spacewatch | NYS | 1.2 km | MPC · JPL |
| 296097 | 2009 BQ_{34} | — | January 16, 2009 | Kitt Peak | Spacewatch | · | 4.8 km | MPC · JPL |
| 296098 | 2009 BS_{34} | — | January 16, 2009 | Kitt Peak | Spacewatch | · | 2.4 km | MPC · JPL |
| 296099 | 2009 BO_{35} | — | January 16, 2009 | Kitt Peak | Spacewatch | BRG | 1.9 km | MPC · JPL |
| 296100 | 2009 BS_{39} | — | January 16, 2009 | Kitt Peak | Spacewatch | V | 950 m | MPC · JPL |

== 296101–296200 ==
back to top

| Designation | | | Discovery | | | Properties | | Ref |
| Permanent | Provisional | Named after | Date | Site | Discoverer(s) | Category | Diam. | Ref |
|---|---|---|---|---|---|---|---|---|
| 296101 | 2009 BT_{42} | — | January 16, 2009 | Kitt Peak | Spacewatch | AGN | 1.2 km | MPC · JPL |
| 296102 | 2009 BV_{42} | — | January 16, 2009 | Kitt Peak | Spacewatch | · | 810 m | MPC · JPL |
| 296103 | 2009 BC_{43} | — | January 16, 2009 | Kitt Peak | Spacewatch | · | 1.5 km | MPC · JPL |
| 296104 | 2009 BT_{43} | — | January 16, 2009 | Kitt Peak | Spacewatch | · | 2.0 km | MPC · JPL |
| 296105 | 2009 BE_{44} | — | January 16, 2009 | Kitt Peak | Spacewatch | · | 3.2 km | MPC · JPL |
| 296106 | 2009 BG_{44} | — | January 16, 2009 | Kitt Peak | Spacewatch | · | 3.0 km | MPC · JPL |
| 296107 | 2009 BR_{44} | — | January 16, 2009 | Kitt Peak | Spacewatch | · | 6.1 km | MPC · JPL |
| 296108 | 2009 BQ_{47} | — | January 16, 2009 | Mount Lemmon | Mount Lemmon Survey | AGN | 1.6 km | MPC · JPL |
| 296109 | 2009 BK_{49} | — | January 16, 2009 | Mount Lemmon | Mount Lemmon Survey | · | 3.2 km | MPC · JPL |
| 296110 | 2009 BR_{50} | — | January 16, 2009 | Mount Lemmon | Mount Lemmon Survey | · | 2.1 km | MPC · JPL |
| 296111 | 2009 BU_{50} | — | January 16, 2009 | Mount Lemmon | Mount Lemmon Survey | · | 2.5 km | MPC · JPL |
| 296112 | 2009 BW_{50} | — | January 16, 2009 | Mount Lemmon | Mount Lemmon Survey | · | 2.5 km | MPC · JPL |
| 296113 | 2009 BT_{53} | — | January 16, 2009 | Mount Lemmon | Mount Lemmon Survey | THM | 2.4 km | MPC · JPL |
| 296114 | 2009 BG_{55} | — | January 16, 2009 | Mount Lemmon | Mount Lemmon Survey | · | 2.2 km | MPC · JPL |
| 296115 | 2009 BH_{56} | — | January 17, 2009 | Mount Lemmon | Mount Lemmon Survey | KOR | 1.6 km | MPC · JPL |
| 296116 | 2009 BS_{60} | — | January 17, 2009 | Mount Lemmon | Mount Lemmon Survey | NYS | 1.4 km | MPC · JPL |
| 296117 | 2009 BO_{62} | — | January 19, 2009 | Mount Lemmon | Mount Lemmon Survey | EUP | 7.4 km | MPC · JPL |
| 296118 | 2009 BJ_{63} | — | January 20, 2009 | Mount Lemmon | Mount Lemmon Survey | AGN | 1.3 km | MPC · JPL |
| 296119 | 2009 BU_{64} | — | January 20, 2009 | Catalina | CSS | BRA | 2.2 km | MPC · JPL |
| 296120 | 2009 BK_{65} | — | January 20, 2009 | Kitt Peak | Spacewatch | · | 2.1 km | MPC · JPL |
| 296121 | 2009 BL_{65} | — | January 20, 2009 | Kitt Peak | Spacewatch | · | 1.9 km | MPC · JPL |
| 296122 | 2009 BA_{68} | — | January 20, 2009 | Kitt Peak | Spacewatch | · | 2.3 km | MPC · JPL |
| 296123 | 2009 BC_{68} | — | January 20, 2009 | Kitt Peak | Spacewatch | · | 2.5 km | MPC · JPL |
| 296124 | 2009 BL_{69} | — | January 25, 2009 | Catalina | CSS | · | 2.4 km | MPC · JPL |
| 296125 | 2009 BQ_{70} | — | January 25, 2009 | Catalina | CSS | · | 2.1 km | MPC · JPL |
| 296126 | 2009 BE_{71} | — | January 26, 2009 | Purple Mountain | PMO NEO Survey Program | · | 1.5 km | MPC · JPL |
| 296127 | 2009 BN_{71} | — | January 21, 2009 | Dauban | Kugel, F. | · | 1.5 km | MPC · JPL |
| 296128 | 2009 BQ_{72} | — | January 28, 2009 | Dauban | Kugel, F. | · | 3.0 km | MPC · JPL |
| 296129 | 2009 BG_{73} | — | January 29, 2009 | Calvin-Rehoboth | L. A. Molnar | · | 3.1 km | MPC · JPL |
| 296130 | 2009 BT_{73} | — | January 30, 2009 | Wildberg | R. Apitzsch | · | 1.9 km | MPC · JPL |
| 296131 | 2009 BT_{75} | — | January 24, 2009 | Purple Mountain | PMO NEO Survey Program | · | 3.1 km | MPC · JPL |
| 296132 | 2009 BS_{76} | — | January 27, 2009 | Purple Mountain | PMO NEO Survey Program | · | 1.5 km | MPC · JPL |
| 296133 | 2009 BG_{77} | — | January 18, 2009 | Sierra Stars | Dillon, W. G. | NYS | 1.3 km | MPC · JPL |
| 296134 | 2009 BN_{81} | — | January 26, 2009 | Bergisch Gladbach | W. Bickel | · | 4.2 km | MPC · JPL |
| 296135 | 2009 BS_{84} | — | January 25, 2009 | Kitt Peak | Spacewatch | (159) | 2.8 km | MPC · JPL |
| 296136 | 2009 BB_{86} | — | January 25, 2009 | Kitt Peak | Spacewatch | (5) | 1.2 km | MPC · JPL |
| 296137 | 2009 BU_{86} | — | January 25, 2009 | Kitt Peak | Spacewatch | · | 3.3 km | MPC · JPL |
| 296138 | 2009 BD_{87} | — | January 25, 2009 | Kitt Peak | Spacewatch | · | 2.8 km | MPC · JPL |
| 296139 | 2009 BB_{91} | — | January 25, 2009 | Kitt Peak | Spacewatch | · | 1.7 km | MPC · JPL |
| 296140 | 2009 BK_{91} | — | January 25, 2009 | Kitt Peak | Spacewatch | MAS | 860 m | MPC · JPL |
| 296141 | 2009 BR_{91} | — | January 25, 2009 | Kitt Peak | Spacewatch | AGN | 1.6 km | MPC · JPL |
| 296142 | 2009 BL_{92} | — | January 25, 2009 | Kitt Peak | Spacewatch | · | 950 m | MPC · JPL |
| 296143 | 2009 BG_{96} | — | January 24, 2009 | Purple Mountain | PMO NEO Survey Program | · | 2.3 km | MPC · JPL |
| 296144 | 2009 BA_{97} | — | January 25, 2009 | Catalina | CSS | · | 1.3 km | MPC · JPL |
| 296145 | 2009 BS_{97} | — | January 25, 2009 | Kitt Peak | Spacewatch | NYS | 1.3 km | MPC · JPL |
| 296146 | 2009 BE_{101} | — | January 29, 2009 | Catalina | CSS | · | 2.6 km | MPC · JPL |
| 296147 | 2009 BA_{102} | — | January 29, 2009 | Mount Lemmon | Mount Lemmon Survey | · | 1.9 km | MPC · JPL |
| 296148 | 2009 BD_{104} | — | January 25, 2009 | Kitt Peak | Spacewatch | · | 1.2 km | MPC · JPL |
| 296149 | 2009 BN_{104} | — | January 25, 2009 | Kitt Peak | Spacewatch | NYS | 1.2 km | MPC · JPL |
| 296150 | 2009 BE_{107} | — | January 28, 2009 | Catalina | CSS | · | 2.1 km | MPC · JPL |
| 296151 | 2009 BQ_{108} | — | January 29, 2009 | Mount Lemmon | Mount Lemmon Survey | · | 3.6 km | MPC · JPL |
| 296152 | 2009 BW_{109} | — | January 30, 2009 | Mount Lemmon | Mount Lemmon Survey | · | 3.7 km | MPC · JPL |
| 296153 | 2009 BX_{109} | — | January 30, 2009 | Mount Lemmon | Mount Lemmon Survey | · | 2.4 km | MPC · JPL |
| 296154 | 2009 BW_{112} | — | January 31, 2009 | Mount Lemmon | Mount Lemmon Survey | V | 870 m | MPC · JPL |
| 296155 | 2009 BF_{113} | — | January 24, 2009 | Cerro Burek | Burek, Cerro | · | 2.5 km | MPC · JPL |
| 296156 | 2009 BG_{114} | — | January 26, 2009 | Mount Lemmon | Mount Lemmon Survey | MAS | 920 m | MPC · JPL |
| 296157 | 2009 BC_{115} | — | January 26, 2009 | Purple Mountain | PMO NEO Survey Program | MAS | 1.3 km | MPC · JPL |
| 296158 | 2009 BF_{115} | — | January 28, 2009 | Catalina | CSS | NYS | 1.8 km | MPC · JPL |
| 296159 | 2009 BX_{122} | — | January 31, 2009 | Kitt Peak | Spacewatch | · | 3.0 km | MPC · JPL |
| 296160 | 2009 BO_{123} | — | January 31, 2009 | Kitt Peak | Spacewatch | · | 3.1 km | MPC · JPL |
| 296161 | 2009 BX_{123} | — | January 31, 2009 | Kitt Peak | Spacewatch | · | 2.0 km | MPC · JPL |
| 296162 | 2009 BX_{126} | — | January 29, 2009 | Kitt Peak | Spacewatch | KOR | 1.4 km | MPC · JPL |
| 296163 | 2009 BJ_{127} | — | January 29, 2009 | Kitt Peak | Spacewatch | · | 2.1 km | MPC · JPL |
| 296164 | 2009 BV_{127} | — | January 29, 2009 | Kitt Peak | Spacewatch | NYS | 1.3 km | MPC · JPL |
| 296165 | 2009 BW_{127} | — | January 29, 2009 | Kitt Peak | Spacewatch | · | 3.6 km | MPC · JPL |
| 296166 | 2009 BT_{129} | — | January 30, 2009 | Mount Lemmon | Mount Lemmon Survey | · | 2.0 km | MPC · JPL |
| 296167 | 2009 BO_{131} | — | January 31, 2009 | Mount Lemmon | Mount Lemmon Survey | · | 2.6 km | MPC · JPL |
| 296168 | 2009 BS_{131} | — | January 27, 2009 | Purple Mountain | PMO NEO Survey Program | · | 3.9 km | MPC · JPL |
| 296169 | 2009 BS_{133} | — | January 29, 2009 | Kitt Peak | Spacewatch | · | 5.4 km | MPC · JPL |
| 296170 | 2009 BX_{133} | — | January 29, 2009 | Kitt Peak | Spacewatch | MAS | 770 m | MPC · JPL |
| 296171 | 2009 BP_{134} | — | January 29, 2009 | Kitt Peak | Spacewatch | (5) | 1.6 km | MPC · JPL |
| 296172 | 2009 BE_{136} | — | January 29, 2009 | Kitt Peak | Spacewatch | · | 1.7 km | MPC · JPL |
| 296173 | 2009 BH_{136} | — | January 29, 2009 | Kitt Peak | Spacewatch | · | 1.6 km | MPC · JPL |
| 296174 | 2009 BK_{139} | — | January 29, 2009 | Kitt Peak | Spacewatch | · | 1.7 km | MPC · JPL |
| 296175 | 2009 BD_{143} | — | January 30, 2009 | Kitt Peak | Spacewatch | · | 1.9 km | MPC · JPL |
| 296176 | 2009 BT_{143} | — | January 30, 2009 | Kitt Peak | Spacewatch | · | 1 km | MPC · JPL |
| 296177 | 2009 BM_{149} | — | January 31, 2009 | Mount Lemmon | Mount Lemmon Survey | · | 3.7 km | MPC · JPL |
| 296178 | 2009 BB_{150} | — | January 31, 2009 | Kitt Peak | Spacewatch | · | 3.4 km | MPC · JPL |
| 296179 | 2009 BM_{151} | — | January 29, 2009 | Mount Lemmon | Mount Lemmon Survey | · | 1.4 km | MPC · JPL |
| 296180 | 2009 BO_{151} | — | January 29, 2009 | Mount Lemmon | Mount Lemmon Survey | · | 3.9 km | MPC · JPL |
| 296181 | 2009 BH_{153} | — | January 31, 2009 | Kitt Peak | Spacewatch | THM | 2.2 km | MPC · JPL |
| 296182 | 2009 BW_{153} | — | January 31, 2009 | Kitt Peak | Spacewatch | · | 1.7 km | MPC · JPL |
| 296183 | 2009 BU_{156} | — | January 31, 2009 | Kitt Peak | Spacewatch | · | 1.5 km | MPC · JPL |
| 296184 | 2009 BZ_{157} | — | January 31, 2009 | Kitt Peak | Spacewatch | · | 4.1 km | MPC · JPL |
| 296185 | 2009 BH_{159} | — | January 31, 2009 | Kitt Peak | Spacewatch | EUN | 2.2 km | MPC · JPL |
| 296186 | 2009 BK_{159} | — | January 31, 2009 | Kitt Peak | Spacewatch | · | 3.7 km | MPC · JPL |
| 296187 | 2009 BD_{160} | — | January 30, 2009 | Mount Lemmon | Mount Lemmon Survey | VER | 4.4 km | MPC · JPL |
| 296188 | 2009 BH_{161} | — | January 31, 2009 | Kitt Peak | Spacewatch | NYS | 1.8 km | MPC · JPL |
| 296189 | 2009 BO_{170} | — | January 16, 2009 | Kitt Peak | Spacewatch | · | 1.1 km | MPC · JPL |
| 296190 | 2009 BY_{170} | — | January 16, 2009 | Kitt Peak | Spacewatch | HOF | 3.2 km | MPC · JPL |
| 296191 | 2009 BB_{171} | — | January 17, 2009 | Mount Lemmon | Mount Lemmon Survey | THM | 2.8 km | MPC · JPL |
| 296192 | 2009 BU_{172} | — | January 18, 2009 | Catalina | CSS | BRA | 2.3 km | MPC · JPL |
| 296193 | 2009 BQ_{176} | — | January 31, 2009 | Kitt Peak | Spacewatch | · | 1.1 km | MPC · JPL |
| 296194 | 2009 BA_{183} | — | January 25, 2009 | Kitt Peak | Spacewatch | KOR | 1.8 km | MPC · JPL |
| 296195 | 2009 BH_{183} | — | January 25, 2009 | Catalina | CSS | · | 2.4 km | MPC · JPL |
| 296196 | 2009 BN_{183} | — | January 25, 2009 | Kitt Peak | Spacewatch | · | 3.5 km | MPC · JPL |
| 296197 | 2009 BN_{186} | — | January 18, 2009 | Kitt Peak | Spacewatch | · | 2.9 km | MPC · JPL |
| 296198 | 2009 BA_{187} | — | January 25, 2009 | Kitt Peak | Spacewatch | · | 3.3 km | MPC · JPL |
| 296199 | 2009 BH_{187} | — | January 26, 2009 | Purple Mountain | PMO NEO Survey Program | · | 5.0 km | MPC · JPL |
| 296200 | 2009 BM_{187} | — | January 30, 2009 | Mount Lemmon | Mount Lemmon Survey | VER | 3.2 km | MPC · JPL |

== 296201–296300 ==
back to top

| Designation | | | Discovery | | | Properties | | Ref |
| Permanent | Provisional | Named after | Date | Site | Discoverer(s) | Category | Diam. | Ref |
|---|---|---|---|---|---|---|---|---|
| 296201 | 2009 BN_{188} | — | January 31, 2009 | Mount Lemmon | Mount Lemmon Survey | · | 4.3 km | MPC · JPL |
| 296202 | 2009 BO_{188} | — | January 31, 2009 | Kitt Peak | Spacewatch | · | 4.1 km | MPC · JPL |
| 296203 | 2009 BY_{188} | — | January 18, 2009 | Catalina | CSS | · | 5.6 km | MPC · JPL |
| 296204 | 2009 BT_{189} | — | January 20, 2009 | Mount Lemmon | Mount Lemmon Survey | · | 2.3 km | MPC · JPL |
| 296205 | 2009 CC_{1} | — | February 1, 2009 | Bisei SG Center | BATTeRS | · | 1.6 km | MPC · JPL |
| 296206 | 2009 CE_{1} | — | February 1, 2009 | Bisei SG Center | BATTeRS | PAD | 2.8 km | MPC · JPL |
| 296207 | 2009 CO_{2} | — | February 2, 2009 | Moletai | K. Černis, Zdanavicius, J. | · | 2.9 km | MPC · JPL |
| 296208 | 2009 CG_{5} | — | February 13, 2009 | Calar Alto | F. Hormuth | · | 1.9 km | MPC · JPL |
| 296209 | 2009 CO_{7} | — | February 1, 2009 | Mount Lemmon | Mount Lemmon Survey | · | 1.9 km | MPC · JPL |
| 296210 | 2009 CQ_{12} | — | February 2, 2009 | Catalina | CSS | · | 850 m | MPC · JPL |
| 296211 | 2009 CB_{15} | — | February 3, 2009 | Kitt Peak | Spacewatch | · | 2.4 km | MPC · JPL |
| 296212 | 2009 CK_{22} | — | February 1, 2009 | Kitt Peak | Spacewatch | KOR | 1.6 km | MPC · JPL |
| 296213 | 2009 CL_{22} | — | February 1, 2009 | Kitt Peak | Spacewatch | · | 3.3 km | MPC · JPL |
| 296214 | 2009 CM_{22} | — | February 1, 2009 | Kitt Peak | Spacewatch | · | 1.3 km | MPC · JPL |
| 296215 | 2009 CN_{23} | — | February 1, 2009 | Kitt Peak | Spacewatch | · | 2.5 km | MPC · JPL |
| 296216 | 2009 CE_{26} | — | February 1, 2009 | Kitt Peak | Spacewatch | · | 3.4 km | MPC · JPL |
| 296217 | 2009 CQ_{26} | — | February 1, 2009 | Kitt Peak | Spacewatch | HOF | 3.2 km | MPC · JPL |
| 296218 | 2009 CM_{27} | — | February 1, 2009 | Kitt Peak | Spacewatch | EOS | 2.3 km | MPC · JPL |
| 296219 | 2009 CY_{27} | — | February 1, 2009 | Kitt Peak | Spacewatch | · | 2.3 km | MPC · JPL |
| 296220 | 2009 CC_{28} | — | February 1, 2009 | Kitt Peak | Spacewatch | · | 1.7 km | MPC · JPL |
| 296221 | 2009 CW_{28} | — | February 1, 2009 | Kitt Peak | Spacewatch | · | 1.6 km | MPC · JPL |
| 296222 | 2009 CN_{29} | — | February 1, 2009 | Kitt Peak | Spacewatch | KOR | 1.7 km | MPC · JPL |
| 296223 | 2009 CR_{33} | — | February 2, 2009 | Kitt Peak | Spacewatch | · | 1.0 km | MPC · JPL |
| 296224 | 2009 CB_{35} | — | February 2, 2009 | Mount Lemmon | Mount Lemmon Survey | · | 2.2 km | MPC · JPL |
| 296225 | 2009 CQ_{36} | — | February 3, 2009 | Kitt Peak | Spacewatch | · | 3.6 km | MPC · JPL |
| 296226 | 2009 CH_{38} | — | February 13, 2009 | Kitt Peak | Spacewatch | · | 740 m | MPC · JPL |
| 296227 | 2009 CK_{38} | — | February 13, 2009 | Kitt Peak | Spacewatch | · | 1.2 km | MPC · JPL |
| 296228 | 2009 CB_{39} | — | February 13, 2009 | Kitt Peak | Spacewatch | · | 1.5 km | MPC · JPL |
| 296229 | 2009 CC_{44} | — | February 14, 2009 | Kitt Peak | Spacewatch | · | 3.9 km | MPC · JPL |
| 296230 | 2009 CG_{44} | — | February 14, 2009 | Kitt Peak | Spacewatch | · | 3.8 km | MPC · JPL |
| 296231 | 2009 CR_{45} | — | February 14, 2009 | Kitt Peak | Spacewatch | · | 1.9 km | MPC · JPL |
| 296232 | 2009 CS_{47} | — | February 14, 2009 | Kitt Peak | Spacewatch | · | 1.1 km | MPC · JPL |
| 296233 | 2009 CQ_{50} | — | February 14, 2009 | La Sagra | OAM | EOS | 2.7 km | MPC · JPL |
| 296234 | 2009 CD_{51} | — | February 14, 2009 | La Sagra | OAM | EOS | 2.4 km | MPC · JPL |
| 296235 | 2009 CK_{51} | — | February 14, 2009 | La Sagra | OAM | HNS | 1.3 km | MPC · JPL |
| 296236 | 2009 CF_{54} | — | February 13, 2009 | Kitt Peak | Spacewatch | DOR | 3.0 km | MPC · JPL |
| 296237 | 2009 CA_{56} | — | February 1, 2009 | Kitt Peak | Spacewatch | · | 4.0 km | MPC · JPL |
| 296238 | 2009 CW_{57} | — | February 2, 2009 | Mount Lemmon | Mount Lemmon Survey | · | 3.5 km | MPC · JPL |
| 296239 | 2009 CY_{59} | — | February 4, 2009 | Mount Lemmon | Mount Lemmon Survey | · | 1.2 km | MPC · JPL |
| 296240 | 2009 CE_{60} | — | February 14, 2009 | La Sagra | OAM | · | 3.8 km | MPC · JPL |
| 296241 | 2009 CN_{60} | — | February 3, 2009 | Mount Lemmon | Mount Lemmon Survey | PAD | 1.9 km | MPC · JPL |
| 296242 | 2009 DW_{6} | — | February 17, 2009 | Kitt Peak | Spacewatch | · | 1.3 km | MPC · JPL |
| 296243 | 2009 DZ_{11} | — | February 18, 2009 | Socorro | LINEAR | · | 1.9 km | MPC · JPL |
| 296244 | 2009 DA_{12} | — | February 22, 2009 | Catalina | CSS | H | 760 m | MPC · JPL |
| 296245 | 2009 DQ_{12} | — | February 16, 2009 | Kitt Peak | Spacewatch | · | 1.3 km | MPC · JPL |
| 296246 | 2009 DN_{13} | — | February 16, 2009 | Kitt Peak | Spacewatch | · | 2.0 km | MPC · JPL |
| 296247 | 2009 DA_{15} | — | February 20, 2009 | Calvin-Rehoboth | Calvin College | · | 2.3 km | MPC · JPL |
| 296248 | 2009 DL_{17} | — | February 17, 2009 | Kitt Peak | Spacewatch | · | 1.6 km | MPC · JPL |
| 296249 | 2009 DR_{18} | — | February 19, 2009 | Mount Lemmon | Mount Lemmon Survey | · | 2.2 km | MPC · JPL |
| 296250 | 2009 DC_{20} | — | February 16, 2009 | Catalina | CSS | HNS | 1.9 km | MPC · JPL |
| 296251 | 2009 DH_{21} | — | February 19, 2009 | Kitt Peak | Spacewatch | · | 2.9 km | MPC · JPL |
| 296252 | 2009 DK_{23} | — | February 19, 2009 | Kitt Peak | Spacewatch | · | 2.9 km | MPC · JPL |
| 296253 | 2009 DM_{23} | — | February 19, 2009 | Kitt Peak | Spacewatch | · | 640 m | MPC · JPL |
| 296254 | 2009 DP_{23} | — | February 20, 2009 | Kitt Peak | Spacewatch | EUN | 1.2 km | MPC · JPL |
| 296255 | 2009 DU_{23} | — | February 20, 2009 | Mount Lemmon | Mount Lemmon Survey | · | 2.3 km | MPC · JPL |
| 296256 | 2009 DB_{28} | — | February 22, 2009 | Calar Alto | F. Hormuth | EOS | 2.4 km | MPC · JPL |
| 296257 | 2009 DQ_{31} | — | February 20, 2009 | Kitt Peak | Spacewatch | · | 3.3 km | MPC · JPL |
| 296258 | 2009 DW_{32} | — | February 20, 2009 | Kitt Peak | Spacewatch | · | 3.2 km | MPC · JPL |
| 296259 | 2009 DP_{33} | — | February 20, 2009 | Kitt Peak | Spacewatch | · | 3.8 km | MPC · JPL |
| 296260 | 2009 DM_{34} | — | February 20, 2009 | Kitt Peak | Spacewatch | HYG | 3.3 km | MPC · JPL |
| 296261 | 2009 DX_{34} | — | February 20, 2009 | Kitt Peak | Spacewatch | · | 3.1 km | MPC · JPL |
| 296262 | 2009 DA_{35} | — | February 20, 2009 | Kitt Peak | Spacewatch | BRA | 2.6 km | MPC · JPL |
| 296263 | 2009 DO_{35} | — | February 20, 2009 | Kitt Peak | Spacewatch | · | 1.8 km | MPC · JPL |
| 296264 | 2009 DH_{36} | — | February 22, 2009 | Mount Lemmon | Mount Lemmon Survey | · | 2.1 km | MPC · JPL |
| 296265 | 2009 DY_{38} | — | February 19, 2009 | Catalina | CSS | · | 2.7 km | MPC · JPL |
| 296266 | 2009 DO_{39} | — | February 19, 2009 | Dauban | Kugel, F. | · | 1.6 km | MPC · JPL |
| 296267 | 2009 DY_{40} | — | February 16, 2009 | La Sagra | OAM | · | 2.2 km | MPC · JPL |
| 296268 | 2009 DA_{41} | — | February 17, 2009 | La Sagra | OAM | HOF | 3.2 km | MPC · JPL |
| 296269 | 2009 DZ_{41} | — | February 19, 2009 | La Sagra | OAM | · | 3.1 km | MPC · JPL |
| 296270 | 2009 DO_{43} | — | February 19, 2009 | Kitt Peak | Spacewatch | · | 1.1 km | MPC · JPL |
| 296271 | 2009 DH_{45} | — | February 26, 2009 | Socorro | LINEAR | V | 780 m | MPC · JPL |
| 296272 | 2009 DU_{45} | — | February 23, 2009 | Socorro | LINEAR | · | 1.6 km | MPC · JPL |
| 296273 | 2009 DX_{45} | — | February 23, 2009 | Socorro | LINEAR | EOS | 2.6 km | MPC · JPL |
| 296274 | 2009 DV_{47} | — | February 28, 2009 | Wildberg | R. Apitzsch | VER | 3.8 km | MPC · JPL |
| 296275 | 2009 DD_{48} | — | February 26, 2009 | Socorro | LINEAR | · | 1.6 km | MPC · JPL |
| 296276 | 2009 DN_{51} | — | February 21, 2009 | Kitt Peak | Spacewatch | (5) | 1.4 km | MPC · JPL |
| 296277 | 2009 DB_{55} | — | February 22, 2009 | Kitt Peak | Spacewatch | · | 1.9 km | MPC · JPL |
| 296278 | 2009 DD_{57} | — | February 22, 2009 | Kitt Peak | Spacewatch | · | 840 m | MPC · JPL |
| 296279 | 2009 DG_{58} | — | February 22, 2009 | Kitt Peak | Spacewatch | KOR | 1.8 km | MPC · JPL |
| 296280 | 2009 DH_{61} | — | February 22, 2009 | Kitt Peak | Spacewatch | · | 2.1 km | MPC · JPL |
| 296281 | 2009 DL_{61} | — | February 22, 2009 | Kitt Peak | Spacewatch | · | 2.0 km | MPC · JPL |
| 296282 | 2009 DP_{65} | — | February 22, 2009 | Mount Lemmon | Mount Lemmon Survey | · | 5.6 km | MPC · JPL |
| 296283 | 2009 DQ_{69} | — | February 26, 2009 | Catalina | CSS | · | 880 m | MPC · JPL |
| 296284 | 2009 DF_{71} | — | February 17, 2009 | Kitt Peak | Spacewatch | · | 5.6 km | MPC · JPL |
| 296285 | 2009 DD_{73} | — | February 25, 2009 | Črni Vrh | Skvarč, J. | · | 4.2 km | MPC · JPL |
| 296286 | 2009 DF_{73} | — | September 12, 2006 | Catalina | CSS | EOS | 2.1 km | MPC · JPL |
| 296287 | 2009 DV_{74} | — | February 26, 2009 | Kitt Peak | Spacewatch | · | 920 m | MPC · JPL |
| 296288 | 2009 DE_{75} | — | February 19, 2009 | Kitt Peak | Spacewatch | · | 1.2 km | MPC · JPL |
| 296289 | 2009 DY_{77} | — | February 24, 2009 | La Sagra | OAM | TEL | 2.0 km | MPC · JPL |
| 296290 | 2009 DE_{82} | — | February 24, 2009 | Kitt Peak | Spacewatch | · | 670 m | MPC · JPL |
| 296291 | 2009 DU_{83} | — | February 24, 2009 | Kitt Peak | Spacewatch | · | 2.3 km | MPC · JPL |
| 296292 | 2009 DA_{86} | — | February 27, 2009 | Kitt Peak | Spacewatch | · | 1.0 km | MPC · JPL |
| 296293 | 2009 DD_{89} | — | February 24, 2009 | Kitt Peak | Spacewatch | · | 3.2 km | MPC · JPL |
| 296294 | 2009 DL_{89} | — | February 24, 2009 | Mount Lemmon | Mount Lemmon Survey | EUN | 1.6 km | MPC · JPL |
| 296295 | 2009 DN_{90} | — | February 26, 2009 | Catalina | CSS | · | 610 m | MPC · JPL |
| 296296 | 2009 DW_{104} | — | February 26, 2009 | Kitt Peak | Spacewatch | · | 1.5 km | MPC · JPL |
| 296297 | 2009 DT_{106} | — | February 28, 2009 | Kitt Peak | Spacewatch | · | 4.1 km | MPC · JPL |
| 296298 | 2009 DQ_{107} | — | February 23, 2009 | La Sagra | OAM | · | 2.4 km | MPC · JPL |
| 296299 | 2009 DF_{113} | — | February 27, 2009 | Kitt Peak | Spacewatch | · | 5.0 km | MPC · JPL |
| 296300 | 2009 DA_{120} | — | February 27, 2009 | Kitt Peak | Spacewatch | HYG | 3.0 km | MPC · JPL |

== 296301–296400 ==
back to top

| Designation | | | Discovery | | | Properties | | Ref |
| Permanent | Provisional | Named after | Date | Site | Discoverer(s) | Category | Diam. | Ref |
|---|---|---|---|---|---|---|---|---|
| 296301 | 2009 DU_{121} | — | February 27, 2009 | Kitt Peak | Spacewatch | · | 1.5 km | MPC · JPL |
| 296302 | 2009 DN_{123} | — | February 24, 2009 | Catalina | CSS | · | 2.5 km | MPC · JPL |
| 296303 | 2009 DH_{125} | — | February 19, 2009 | Kitt Peak | Spacewatch | MAS | 770 m | MPC · JPL |
| 296304 | 2009 DH_{126} | — | February 19, 2009 | Kitt Peak | Spacewatch | · | 2.9 km | MPC · JPL |
| 296305 | 2009 DP_{126} | — | February 20, 2009 | Kitt Peak | Spacewatch | KOR | 1.7 km | MPC · JPL |
| 296306 | 2009 DS_{127} | — | February 20, 2009 | Kitt Peak | Spacewatch | · | 3.4 km | MPC · JPL |
| 296307 | 2009 DU_{127} | — | February 20, 2009 | Kitt Peak | Spacewatch | · | 2.8 km | MPC · JPL |
| 296308 | 2009 DV_{128} | — | February 24, 2009 | Catalina | CSS | · | 3.1 km | MPC · JPL |
| 296309 | 2009 DX_{128} | — | February 24, 2009 | Kitt Peak | Spacewatch | · | 630 m | MPC · JPL |
| 296310 | 2009 DC_{131} | — | February 20, 2009 | Mount Lemmon | Mount Lemmon Survey | · | 1.6 km | MPC · JPL |
| 296311 | 2009 DS_{131} | — | February 19, 2009 | Kitt Peak | Spacewatch | VER | 3.2 km | MPC · JPL |
| 296312 | 2009 DW_{133} | — | February 28, 2009 | Kitt Peak | Spacewatch | · | 2.5 km | MPC · JPL |
| 296313 | 2009 DJ_{134} | — | February 28, 2009 | Kitt Peak | Spacewatch | · | 800 m | MPC · JPL |
| 296314 | 2009 DG_{137} | — | February 19, 2009 | Kitt Peak | Spacewatch | · | 1.6 km | MPC · JPL |
| 296315 | 2009 DK_{137} | — | February 24, 2009 | Kitt Peak | Spacewatch | V | 720 m | MPC · JPL |
| 296316 | 2009 DB_{140} | — | February 19, 2009 | Kitt Peak | Spacewatch | · | 1.6 km | MPC · JPL |
| 296317 | 2009 DL_{140} | — | February 21, 2009 | Kitt Peak | Spacewatch | · | 3.4 km | MPC · JPL |
| 296318 | 2009 EN_{2} | — | March 3, 2009 | Catalina | CSS | APO +1km | 810 m | MPC · JPL |
| 296319 | 2009 EE_{3} | — | March 5, 2009 | Great Shefford | Birtwhistle, P. | · | 2.2 km | MPC · JPL |
| 296320 | 2009 EX_{7} | — | March 2, 2009 | Mount Lemmon | Mount Lemmon Survey | · | 2.1 km | MPC · JPL |
| 296321 | 2009 EM_{11} | — | January 11, 2008 | Kitt Peak | Spacewatch | · | 2.7 km | MPC · JPL |
| 296322 | 2009 ER_{14} | — | March 15, 2009 | Kitt Peak | Spacewatch | KOR | 2.0 km | MPC · JPL |
| 296323 | 2009 ES_{14} | — | March 15, 2009 | Kitt Peak | Spacewatch | · | 2.9 km | MPC · JPL |
| 296324 | 2009 ES_{15} | — | March 15, 2009 | Kitt Peak | Spacewatch | · | 1.9 km | MPC · JPL |
| 296325 | 2009 EG_{16} | — | March 15, 2009 | Kitt Peak | Spacewatch | · | 1.4 km | MPC · JPL |
| 296326 | 2009 EX_{16} | — | March 15, 2009 | Kitt Peak | Spacewatch | · | 2.4 km | MPC · JPL |
| 296327 | 2009 EN_{17} | — | March 15, 2009 | Catalina | CSS | · | 3.0 km | MPC · JPL |
| 296328 | 2009 EU_{19} | — | March 15, 2009 | Mount Lemmon | Mount Lemmon Survey | · | 2.1 km | MPC · JPL |
| 296329 | 2009 EW_{19} | — | March 15, 2009 | Mount Lemmon | Mount Lemmon Survey | · | 1.4 km | MPC · JPL |
| 296330 | 2009 EF_{20} | — | March 15, 2009 | La Sagra | OAM | · | 4.3 km | MPC · JPL |
| 296331 | 2009 EO_{21} | — | March 15, 2009 | Kitt Peak | Spacewatch | · | 690 m | MPC · JPL |
| 296332 | 2009 EC_{22} | — | March 2, 2009 | Mount Lemmon | Mount Lemmon Survey | · | 960 m | MPC · JPL |
| 296333 | 2009 EZ_{22} | — | March 3, 2009 | Mount Lemmon | Mount Lemmon Survey | · | 2.0 km | MPC · JPL |
| 296334 | 2009 EQ_{24} | — | March 2, 2009 | Mount Lemmon | Mount Lemmon Survey | PAD | 2.0 km | MPC · JPL |
| 296335 | 2009 EM_{25} | — | March 3, 2009 | Mount Lemmon | Mount Lemmon Survey | KOR | 1.8 km | MPC · JPL |
| 296336 | 2009 EA_{26} | — | March 8, 2009 | Mount Lemmon | Mount Lemmon Survey | URS | 5.1 km | MPC · JPL |
| 296337 | 2009 EQ_{28} | — | March 3, 2009 | Catalina | CSS | LUT | 4.3 km | MPC · JPL |
| 296338 | 2009 EL_{29} | — | March 2, 2009 | Mount Lemmon | Mount Lemmon Survey | NYS | 1.5 km | MPC · JPL |
| 296339 | 2009 EC_{31} | — | March 2, 2009 | Kitt Peak | Spacewatch | · | 740 m | MPC · JPL |
| 296340 | 2009 FO | — | March 17, 2009 | Catalina | CSS | H | 700 m | MPC · JPL |
| 296341 | 2009 FE_{1} | — | March 16, 2009 | Purple Mountain | PMO NEO Survey Program | · | 3.7 km | MPC · JPL |
| 296342 | 2009 FV_{3} | — | March 18, 2009 | Dauban | Kugel, F. | · | 3.3 km | MPC · JPL |
| 296343 | 2009 FX_{3} | — | March 18, 2009 | La Sagra | OAM | · | 5.4 km | MPC · JPL |
| 296344 | 2009 FJ_{4} | — | March 18, 2009 | La Sagra | OAM | · | 1.2 km | MPC · JPL |
| 296345 | 2009 FR_{4} | — | March 19, 2009 | Tzec Maun | L. Elenin | · | 1.7 km | MPC · JPL |
| 296346 | 2009 FO_{7} | — | March 16, 2009 | Kitt Peak | Spacewatch | · | 2.1 km | MPC · JPL |
| 296347 | 2009 FA_{9} | — | March 16, 2009 | Mount Lemmon | Mount Lemmon Survey | EOS | 1.9 km | MPC · JPL |
| 296348 | 2009 FE_{9} | — | March 16, 2009 | Mount Lemmon | Mount Lemmon Survey | · | 780 m | MPC · JPL |
| 296349 | 2009 FN_{9} | — | March 16, 2009 | Purple Mountain | PMO NEO Survey Program | · | 1.8 km | MPC · JPL |
| 296350 | 2009 FJ_{11} | — | March 17, 2009 | Kitt Peak | Spacewatch | · | 1.5 km | MPC · JPL |
| 296351 Linyongbin | 2009 FZ_{18} | Linyongbin | March 20, 2009 | Lulin | LUSS | · | 2.0 km | MPC · JPL |
| 296352 | 2009 FA_{22} | — | March 18, 2009 | Kitt Peak | Spacewatch | · | 4.7 km | MPC · JPL |
| 296353 | 2009 FG_{22} | — | March 18, 2009 | Kitt Peak | Spacewatch | · | 1.3 km | MPC · JPL |
| 296354 | 2009 FH_{22} | — | March 18, 2009 | Kitt Peak | Spacewatch | · | 3.6 km | MPC · JPL |
| 296355 | 2009 FO_{22} | — | March 19, 2009 | Kitt Peak | Spacewatch | · | 760 m | MPC · JPL |
| 296356 | 2009 FE_{23} | — | March 20, 2009 | Bergisch Gladbach | W. Bickel | · | 1.8 km | MPC · JPL |
| 296357 | 2009 FN_{23} | — | March 21, 2009 | Mount Lemmon | Mount Lemmon Survey | · | 1.3 km | MPC · JPL |
| 296358 | 2009 FD_{25} | — | March 22, 2009 | La Sagra | OAM | V | 1.0 km | MPC · JPL |
| 296359 | 2009 FK_{25} | — | March 21, 2009 | Catalina | CSS | · | 2.9 km | MPC · JPL |
| 296360 | 2009 FM_{25} | — | March 20, 2009 | La Sagra | OAM | NYS | 980 m | MPC · JPL |
| 296361 | 2009 FQ_{25} | — | March 22, 2009 | Hibiscus | Teamo, N. | · | 3.9 km | MPC · JPL |
| 296362 | 2009 FU_{25} | — | March 21, 2009 | Taunus | E. Schwab, R. Kling | · | 4.0 km | MPC · JPL |
| 296363 | 2009 FH_{26} | — | March 17, 2009 | Kitt Peak | Spacewatch | KOR | 2.0 km | MPC · JPL |
| 296364 | 2009 FE_{27} | — | March 19, 2009 | Mount Lemmon | Mount Lemmon Survey | · | 1.6 km | MPC · JPL |
| 296365 | 2009 FZ_{29} | — | March 25, 2009 | Kanab | Sheridan, E. | · | 950 m | MPC · JPL |
| 296366 | 2009 FD_{30} | — | March 23, 2009 | Hibiscus | Teamo, N. | · | 3.3 km | MPC · JPL |
| 296367 | 2009 FF_{31} | — | March 24, 2009 | La Sagra | OAM | · | 2.2 km | MPC · JPL |
| 296368 | 2009 FM_{37} | — | March 24, 2009 | Mount Lemmon | Mount Lemmon Survey | · | 890 m | MPC · JPL |
| 296369 | 2009 FP_{37} | — | October 6, 1999 | Kitt Peak | Spacewatch | · | 1.6 km | MPC · JPL |
| 296370 | 2009 FS_{39} | — | March 27, 2009 | Catalina | CSS | · | 1.1 km | MPC · JPL |
| 296371 | 2009 FF_{42} | — | March 28, 2009 | Kitt Peak | Spacewatch | · | 2.7 km | MPC · JPL |
| 296372 | 2009 FH_{42} | — | March 28, 2009 | Kitt Peak | Spacewatch | · | 1.6 km | MPC · JPL |
| 296373 | 2009 FK_{43} | — | March 30, 2009 | Sierra Stars | Tozzi, F. | T_{j} (2.99) · CYB | 6.5 km | MPC · JPL |
| 296374 | 2009 FA_{44} | — | March 29, 2009 | Bergisch Gladbach | W. Bickel | · | 3.3 km | MPC · JPL |
| 296375 | 2009 FU_{44} | — | March 22, 2009 | Mount Lemmon | Mount Lemmon Survey | · | 3.8 km | MPC · JPL |
| 296376 | 2009 FW_{44} | — | March 24, 2009 | Kitt Peak | Spacewatch | · | 910 m | MPC · JPL |
| 296377 | 2009 FD_{46} | — | March 28, 2009 | Kitt Peak | Spacewatch | H | 560 m | MPC · JPL |
| 296378 | 2009 FU_{46} | — | March 27, 2009 | Kitt Peak | Spacewatch | MAS | 780 m | MPC · JPL |
| 296379 | 2009 FW_{48} | — | March 26, 2009 | Mount Lemmon | Mount Lemmon Survey | · | 1.7 km | MPC · JPL |
| 296380 | 2009 FV_{52} | — | March 29, 2009 | Kitt Peak | Spacewatch | ERI | 2.8 km | MPC · JPL |
| 296381 | 2009 FM_{53} | — | March 29, 2009 | Kitt Peak | Spacewatch | · | 650 m | MPC · JPL |
| 296382 | 2009 FF_{56} | — | March 19, 2009 | Catalina | CSS | · | 4.7 km | MPC · JPL |
| 296383 | 2009 FB_{57} | — | March 29, 2009 | Catalina | CSS | T_{j} (2.99) | 6.3 km | MPC · JPL |
| 296384 | 2009 FW_{57} | — | March 17, 2009 | Kitt Peak | Spacewatch | · | 2.0 km | MPC · JPL |
| 296385 | 2009 FY_{57} | — | March 17, 2009 | Kitt Peak | Spacewatch | · | 2.0 km | MPC · JPL |
| 296386 | 2009 FK_{64} | — | March 31, 2009 | Mount Lemmon | Mount Lemmon Survey | SYL · CYB | 5.0 km | MPC · JPL |
| 296387 | 2009 FX_{64} | — | March 16, 2009 | Kitt Peak | Spacewatch | · | 1.2 km | MPC · JPL |
| 296388 | 2009 FE_{65} | — | March 18, 2009 | Kitt Peak | Spacewatch | MAS | 890 m | MPC · JPL |
| 296389 | 2009 FD_{68} | — | March 28, 2009 | Kitt Peak | Spacewatch | · | 2.9 km | MPC · JPL |
| 296390 | 2009 FR_{68} | — | March 17, 2009 | Kitt Peak | Spacewatch | MAS | 1.0 km | MPC · JPL |
| 296391 | 2009 FJ_{70} | — | March 19, 2009 | Kitt Peak | Spacewatch | · | 1.5 km | MPC · JPL |
| 296392 | 2009 FN_{70} | — | March 19, 2009 | Mount Lemmon | Mount Lemmon Survey | · | 2.5 km | MPC · JPL |
| 296393 | 2009 FQ_{70} | — | March 21, 2009 | Kitt Peak | Spacewatch | · | 3.8 km | MPC · JPL |
| 296394 | 2009 FE_{71} | — | March 29, 2009 | Kitt Peak | Spacewatch | · | 1.7 km | MPC · JPL |
| 296395 | 2009 FF_{71} | — | March 29, 2009 | Kitt Peak | Spacewatch | · | 1.6 km | MPC · JPL |
| 296396 | 2009 FW_{71} | — | March 16, 2009 | Kitt Peak | Spacewatch | PHO | 2.3 km | MPC · JPL |
| 296397 | 2009 FS_{72} | — | March 18, 2009 | Mount Lemmon | Mount Lemmon Survey | · | 1.6 km | MPC · JPL |
| 296398 | 2009 FU_{72} | — | March 19, 2009 | Kitt Peak | Spacewatch | · | 1.5 km | MPC · JPL |
| 296399 | 2009 FJ_{74} | — | March 31, 2009 | Mount Lemmon | Mount Lemmon Survey | · | 3.4 km | MPC · JPL |
| 296400 | 2009 FO_{74} | — | March 17, 2009 | Siding Spring | SSS | · | 1.8 km | MPC · JPL |

== 296401–296500 ==
back to top

| Designation | | | Discovery | | | Properties | | Ref |
| Permanent | Provisional | Named after | Date | Site | Discoverer(s) | Category | Diam. | Ref |
|---|---|---|---|---|---|---|---|---|
| 296401 | 2009 FF_{75} | — | March 17, 2009 | Kitt Peak | Spacewatch | · | 4.6 km | MPC · JPL |
| 296402 | 2009 GF_{1} | — | April 3, 2009 | Cerro Burek | Burek, Cerro | · | 1.3 km | MPC · JPL |
| 296403 | 2009 GQ_{1} | — | April 5, 2009 | Cerro Burek | Burek, Cerro | · | 1.9 km | MPC · JPL |
| 296404 | 2009 GT_{1} | — | April 12, 2009 | Altschwendt | W. Ries | · | 860 m | MPC · JPL |
| 296405 | 2009 GE_{2} | — | April 5, 2009 | La Sagra | OAM | NYS | 1.4 km | MPC · JPL |
| 296406 | 2009 GO_{3} | — | April 15, 2009 | Socorro | LINEAR | · | 1.8 km | MPC · JPL |
| 296407 | 2009 GY_{3} | — | April 5, 2009 | Cerro Burek | Burek, Cerro | MAR | 1.2 km | MPC · JPL |
| 296408 | 2009 GV_{4} | — | April 15, 2009 | Siding Spring | SSS | H | 720 m | MPC · JPL |
| 296409 | 2009 GC_{5} | — | April 2, 2009 | Kitt Peak | Spacewatch | KOR | 1.5 km | MPC · JPL |
| 296410 | 2009 GK_{5} | — | April 2, 2009 | Siding Spring | SSS | (194) | 4.5 km | MPC · JPL |
| 296411 | 2009 GX_{5} | — | April 2, 2009 | Mount Lemmon | Mount Lemmon Survey | · | 1.4 km | MPC · JPL |
| 296412 | 2009 HA_{1} | — | April 16, 2009 | Catalina | CSS | · | 1.2 km | MPC · JPL |
| 296413 | 2009 HO_{1} | — | April 17, 2009 | Kitt Peak | Spacewatch | · | 4.6 km | MPC · JPL |
| 296414 | 2009 HT_{1} | — | April 17, 2009 | Catalina | CSS | · | 830 m | MPC · JPL |
| 296415 | 2009 HF_{3} | — | April 16, 2009 | Catalina | CSS | BRA | 2.7 km | MPC · JPL |
| 296416 | 2009 HK_{3} | — | April 16, 2009 | Kitt Peak | Spacewatch | EOS | 4.4 km | MPC · JPL |
| 296417 | 2009 HT_{3} | — | April 17, 2009 | Kitt Peak | Spacewatch | TIR | 2.1 km | MPC · JPL |
| 296418 | 2009 HE_{4} | — | April 17, 2009 | Kitt Peak | Spacewatch | · | 2.7 km | MPC · JPL |
| 296419 | 2009 HT_{4} | — | April 17, 2009 | Kitt Peak | Spacewatch | · | 1.0 km | MPC · JPL |
| 296420 | 2009 HT_{14} | — | April 18, 2009 | Kitt Peak | Spacewatch | V | 710 m | MPC · JPL |
| 296421 | 2009 HQ_{18} | — | April 19, 2009 | Kitt Peak | Spacewatch | · | 1.2 km | MPC · JPL |
| 296422 | 2009 HY_{18} | — | April 19, 2009 | Mount Lemmon | Mount Lemmon Survey | · | 1.1 km | MPC · JPL |
| 296423 | 2009 HO_{22} | — | April 17, 2009 | Kitt Peak | Spacewatch | V | 790 m | MPC · JPL |
| 296424 | 2009 HM_{31} | — | April 19, 2009 | Kitt Peak | Spacewatch | · | 850 m | MPC · JPL |
| 296425 | 2009 HZ_{35} | — | April 20, 2009 | Socorro | LINEAR | AGN | 1.9 km | MPC · JPL |
| 296426 | 2009 HQ_{36} | — | April 20, 2009 | La Sagra | OAM | MAS | 1.1 km | MPC · JPL |
| 296427 | 2009 HD_{37} | — | April 17, 2009 | Catalina | CSS | V | 950 m | MPC · JPL |
| 296428 | 2009 HM_{39} | — | April 18, 2009 | Mount Lemmon | Mount Lemmon Survey | · | 1.5 km | MPC · JPL |
| 296429 | 2009 HB_{41} | — | April 20, 2009 | Kitt Peak | Spacewatch | NYS | 1.2 km | MPC · JPL |
| 296430 | 2009 HU_{41} | — | April 20, 2009 | Kitt Peak | Spacewatch | · | 2.5 km | MPC · JPL |
| 296431 | 2009 HS_{42} | — | April 20, 2009 | Kitt Peak | Spacewatch | · | 1.7 km | MPC · JPL |
| 296432 | 2009 HN_{43} | — | April 20, 2009 | Kitt Peak | Spacewatch | · | 810 m | MPC · JPL |
| 296433 | 2009 HG_{45} | — | April 21, 2009 | La Sagra | OAM | · | 740 m | MPC · JPL |
| 296434 | 2009 HD_{47} | — | April 18, 2009 | Kitt Peak | Spacewatch | KOR | 1.9 km | MPC · JPL |
| 296435 | 2009 HH_{48} | — | April 19, 2009 | Kitt Peak | Spacewatch | · | 3.6 km | MPC · JPL |
| 296436 | 2009 HJ_{48} | — | April 19, 2009 | Kitt Peak | Spacewatch | · | 4.3 km | MPC · JPL |
| 296437 | 2009 HY_{48} | — | April 19, 2009 | Kitt Peak | Spacewatch | · | 830 m | MPC · JPL |
| 296438 | 2009 HZ_{48} | — | April 19, 2009 | Kitt Peak | Spacewatch | · | 2.4 km | MPC · JPL |
| 296439 | 2009 HA_{49} | — | April 19, 2009 | Kitt Peak | Spacewatch | · | 3.4 km | MPC · JPL |
| 296440 | 2009 HP_{51} | — | April 21, 2009 | Kitt Peak | Spacewatch | EOS | 2.8 km | MPC · JPL |
| 296441 | 2009 HQ_{51} | — | April 21, 2009 | Kitt Peak | Spacewatch | · | 1.3 km | MPC · JPL |
| 296442 | 2009 HV_{53} | — | April 20, 2009 | Kitt Peak | Spacewatch | · | 3.2 km | MPC · JPL |
| 296443 | 2009 HL_{54} | — | April 20, 2009 | Kitt Peak | Spacewatch | · | 820 m | MPC · JPL |
| 296444 | 2009 HS_{54} | — | April 20, 2009 | Kitt Peak | Spacewatch | · | 2.1 km | MPC · JPL |
| 296445 | 2009 HQ_{57} | — | April 20, 2009 | La Sagra | OAM | · | 1.5 km | MPC · JPL |
| 296446 Gregorstadler | 2009 HF_{58} | Gregorstadler | April 24, 2009 | Gaisberg | Gierlinger, R. | · | 1.5 km | MPC · JPL |
| 296447 | 2009 HG_{58} | — | April 21, 2009 | La Sagra | OAM | · | 3.5 km | MPC · JPL |
| 296448 | 2009 HE_{59} | — | April 21, 2009 | Bergisch Gladbach | W. Bickel | · | 5.7 km | MPC · JPL |
| 296449 | 2009 HM_{59} | — | April 23, 2009 | La Sagra | OAM | · | 3.2 km | MPC · JPL |
| 296450 | 2009 HL_{64} | — | April 22, 2009 | Kitt Peak | Spacewatch | · | 1.2 km | MPC · JPL |
| 296451 | 2009 HS_{64} | — | April 23, 2009 | Kitt Peak | Spacewatch | · | 3.6 km | MPC · JPL |
| 296452 | 2009 HY_{64} | — | April 23, 2009 | Kitt Peak | Spacewatch | · | 1.3 km | MPC · JPL |
| 296453 | 2009 HD_{65} | — | April 23, 2009 | Kitt Peak | Spacewatch | PHO | 2.8 km | MPC · JPL |
| 296454 | 2009 HJ_{65} | — | April 23, 2009 | Kitt Peak | Spacewatch | · | 2.6 km | MPC · JPL |
| 296455 | 2009 HR_{73} | — | April 18, 2009 | Catalina | CSS | · | 5.5 km | MPC · JPL |
| 296456 | 2009 HY_{73} | — | April 19, 2009 | Catalina | CSS | · | 2.8 km | MPC · JPL |
| 296457 | 2009 HQ_{76} | — | April 26, 2009 | Siding Spring | SSS | · | 2.4 km | MPC · JPL |
| 296458 | 2009 HJ_{79} | — | April 26, 2009 | Kitt Peak | Spacewatch | · | 1.1 km | MPC · JPL |
| 296459 | 2009 HN_{79} | — | April 26, 2009 | Kitt Peak | Spacewatch | · | 1.4 km | MPC · JPL |
| 296460 | 2009 HQ_{80} | — | April 28, 2009 | Catalina | CSS | · | 3.2 km | MPC · JPL |
| 296461 | 2009 HY_{80} | — | April 29, 2009 | Mount Lemmon | Mount Lemmon Survey | · | 3.4 km | MPC · JPL |
| 296462 Corylachlan | 2009 HZ_{81} | Corylachlan | April 23, 2009 | Zadko | Todd, M. | · | 1.7 km | MPC · JPL |
| 296463 | 2009 HT_{83} | — | April 27, 2009 | Kitt Peak | Spacewatch | · | 2.6 km | MPC · JPL |
| 296464 | 2009 HC_{84} | — | April 27, 2009 | Kitt Peak | Spacewatch | · | 1.2 km | MPC · JPL |
| 296465 | 2009 HK_{88} | — | April 24, 2009 | La Sagra | OAM | · | 2.2 km | MPC · JPL |
| 296466 | 2009 HU_{88} | — | April 23, 2009 | La Sagra | OAM | NYS | 1.4 km | MPC · JPL |
| 296467 | 2009 HO_{89} | — | April 30, 2009 | La Sagra | OAM | · | 1.6 km | MPC · JPL |
| 296468 | 2009 HV_{90} | — | April 20, 2009 | Mount Lemmon | Mount Lemmon Survey | · | 890 m | MPC · JPL |
| 296469 | 2009 HB_{91} | — | April 22, 2009 | La Sagra | OAM | · | 1.2 km | MPC · JPL |
| 296470 | 2009 HG_{92} | — | April 29, 2009 | Kitt Peak | Spacewatch | THM | 3.2 km | MPC · JPL |
| 296471 | 2009 HS_{93} | — | April 30, 2009 | Kitt Peak | Spacewatch | · | 2.6 km | MPC · JPL |
| 296472 | 2009 HA_{94} | — | April 28, 2009 | Moletai | K. Černis, Zdanavicius, J. | · | 1.4 km | MPC · JPL |
| 296473 | 2009 HX_{95} | — | April 20, 2009 | Mount Lemmon | Mount Lemmon Survey | MRX | 1.1 km | MPC · JPL |
| 296474 | 2009 HN_{97} | — | April 17, 2009 | Kitt Peak | Spacewatch | · | 2.9 km | MPC · JPL |
| 296475 | 2009 HA_{98} | — | April 19, 2009 | Catalina | CSS | · | 1.9 km | MPC · JPL |
| 296476 | 2009 HB_{98} | — | April 19, 2009 | Kitt Peak | Spacewatch | · | 2.6 km | MPC · JPL |
| 296477 | 2009 HS_{99} | — | April 22, 2009 | Mount Lemmon | Mount Lemmon Survey | · | 1.4 km | MPC · JPL |
| 296478 | 2009 HP_{101} | — | April 19, 2009 | Kitt Peak | Spacewatch | · | 930 m | MPC · JPL |
| 296479 | 2009 HR_{101} | — | April 20, 2009 | Kitt Peak | Spacewatch | · | 5.0 km | MPC · JPL |
| 296480 | 2009 HW_{101} | — | April 18, 2009 | Kitt Peak | Spacewatch | · | 1.1 km | MPC · JPL |
| 296481 | 2009 HM_{102} | — | April 22, 2009 | Mount Lemmon | Mount Lemmon Survey | · | 1.6 km | MPC · JPL |
| 296482 | 2009 HX_{102} | — | April 17, 2009 | Kitt Peak | Spacewatch | NYS | 1.3 km | MPC · JPL |
| 296483 | 2009 HJ_{103} | — | April 18, 2009 | Kitt Peak | Spacewatch | · | 2.3 km | MPC · JPL |
| 296484 | 2009 HW_{103} | — | April 20, 2009 | Kitt Peak | Spacewatch | CYB | 5.7 km | MPC · JPL |
| 296485 | 2009 HP_{104} | — | April 29, 2009 | Kitt Peak | Spacewatch | · | 1.0 km | MPC · JPL |
| 296486 | 2009 HT_{105} | — | April 29, 2009 | Kitt Peak | Spacewatch | · | 750 m | MPC · JPL |
| 296487 | 2009 HX_{105} | — | April 30, 2009 | Mount Lemmon | Mount Lemmon Survey | · | 1.2 km | MPC · JPL |
| 296488 | 2009 JX | — | May 3, 2009 | La Sagra | OAM | V | 890 m | MPC · JPL |
| 296489 | 2009 JY | — | May 4, 2009 | La Sagra | OAM | · | 1.9 km | MPC · JPL |
| 296490 | 2009 JD_{1} | — | May 4, 2009 | La Sagra | OAM | · | 1.5 km | MPC · JPL |
| 296491 | 2009 JH_{1} | — | May 2, 2009 | La Sagra | OAM | · | 820 m | MPC · JPL |
| 296492 | 2009 JS_{1} | — | May 2, 2009 | Purple Mountain | PMO NEO Survey Program | H | 730 m | MPC · JPL |
| 296493 | 2009 JB_{2} | — | May 2, 2009 | Kitt Peak | Spacewatch | · | 5.6 km | MPC · JPL |
| 296494 | 2009 JC_{2} | — | May 2, 2009 | Siding Spring | SSS | · | 860 m | MPC · JPL |
| 296495 | 2009 JF_{4} | — | May 14, 2009 | Mayhill | Lowe, A. | · | 2.1 km | MPC · JPL |
| 296496 | 2009 JL_{6} | — | May 13, 2009 | Kitt Peak | Spacewatch | EOS | 2.7 km | MPC · JPL |
| 296497 | 2009 JY_{10} | — | May 14, 2009 | Kitt Peak | Spacewatch | MAS | 780 m | MPC · JPL |
| 296498 | 2009 JB_{12} | — | May 15, 2009 | Catalina | CSS | · | 2.7 km | MPC · JPL |
| 296499 | 2009 JO_{15} | — | May 3, 2009 | Mount Lemmon | Mount Lemmon Survey | L5 | 10 km | MPC · JPL |
| 296500 | 2009 JZ_{15} | — | May 13, 2009 | Kitt Peak | Spacewatch | EOS | 2.2 km | MPC · JPL |

== 296501–296600 ==
back to top

| Designation | | | Discovery | | | Properties | | Ref |
| Permanent | Provisional | Named after | Date | Site | Discoverer(s) | Category | Diam. | Ref |
|---|---|---|---|---|---|---|---|---|
| 296501 | 2009 JL_{16} | — | May 15, 2009 | Kitt Peak | Spacewatch | · | 3.5 km | MPC · JPL |
| 296502 | 2009 JM_{16} | — | May 15, 2009 | Kitt Peak | Spacewatch | HYG | 3.1 km | MPC · JPL |
| 296503 | 2009 KW | — | May 16, 2009 | Sierra Stars | R. Matson | · | 1.9 km | MPC · JPL |
| 296504 | 2009 KM_{1} | — | May 18, 2009 | Mayhill | Lowe, A. | · | 3.7 km | MPC · JPL |
| 296505 | 2009 KJ_{2} | — | May 19, 2009 | Tzec Maun | Tozzi, F. | · | 2.0 km | MPC · JPL |
| 296506 | 2009 KL_{3} | — | May 23, 2009 | Sierra Stars | R. Matson | · | 950 m | MPC · JPL |
| 296507 | 2009 KL_{4} | — | May 24, 2009 | Kitt Peak | Spacewatch | EUP | 4.8 km | MPC · JPL |
| 296508 | 2009 KA_{8} | — | May 27, 2009 | La Sagra | OAM | · | 2.2 km | MPC · JPL |
| 296509 | 2009 KN_{9} | — | May 25, 2009 | Kitt Peak | Spacewatch | · | 1.3 km | MPC · JPL |
| 296510 | 2009 KL_{11} | — | May 25, 2009 | Kitt Peak | Spacewatch | VER | 4.3 km | MPC · JPL |
| 296511 | 2009 KF_{19} | — | May 28, 2009 | Mount Lemmon | Mount Lemmon Survey | · | 2.4 km | MPC · JPL |
| 296512 | 2009 KW_{19} | — | May 28, 2009 | Kitt Peak | Spacewatch | · | 3.7 km | MPC · JPL |
| 296513 | 2009 KB_{22} | — | May 25, 2009 | Mount Lemmon | Mount Lemmon Survey | L5 | 10 km | MPC · JPL |
| 296514 | 2009 KK_{24} | — | May 27, 2009 | Kitt Peak | Spacewatch | (194) | 2.7 km | MPC · JPL |
| 296515 | 2009 KJ_{28} | — | May 30, 2009 | Mount Lemmon | Mount Lemmon Survey | · | 3.6 km | MPC · JPL |
| 296516 | 2009 LJ | — | June 2, 2009 | Skylive | Tozzi, F. | T_{j} (2.99) | 3.8 km | MPC · JPL |
| 296517 | 2009 LC_{1} | — | June 12, 2009 | Kitt Peak | Spacewatch | EOS | 2.4 km | MPC · JPL |
| 296518 | 2009 LK_{5} | — | June 13, 2009 | Bergisch Gladbach | W. Bickel | · | 1.6 km | MPC · JPL |
| 296519 | 2009 LG_{6} | — | June 15, 2009 | Mount Lemmon | Mount Lemmon Survey | V | 740 m | MPC · JPL |
| 296520 | 2009 MO | — | June 17, 2009 | Mount Lemmon | Mount Lemmon Survey | · | 5.1 km | MPC · JPL |
| 296521 | 2009 MZ_{8} | — | June 29, 2009 | Eskridge | G. Hug | NYS | 1.5 km | MPC · JPL |
| 296522 | 2009 OB | — | July 16, 2009 | La Sagra | OAM | · | 3.0 km | MPC · JPL |
| 296523 | 2009 OT | — | July 18, 2009 | La Sagra | OAM | · | 1.0 km | MPC · JPL |
| 296524 | 2009 OU_{1} | — | July 19, 2009 | Črni Vrh | Matičič, S. | · | 4.8 km | MPC · JPL |
| 296525 Milanovskiy | 2009 OU_{2} | Milanovskiy | July 20, 2009 | Zelenchukskaya Stn | T. V. Krjačko | · | 4.6 km | MPC · JPL |
| 296526 | 2009 OW_{5} | — | July 26, 2009 | Dauban | Kugel, F. | V | 990 m | MPC · JPL |
| 296527 | 2009 OG_{7} | — | July 27, 2009 | Catalina | CSS | · | 1.3 km | MPC · JPL |
| 296528 | 2009 OM_{8} | — | July 19, 2009 | La Sagra | OAM | · | 820 m | MPC · JPL |
| 296529 | 2009 OL_{9} | — | July 28, 2009 | La Sagra | OAM | · | 1.7 km | MPC · JPL |
| 296530 | 2009 OV_{9} | — | July 28, 2009 | Tzec Maun | E. Schwab | · | 950 m | MPC · JPL |
| 296531 | 2009 OF_{10} | — | July 29, 2009 | La Sagra | OAM | V | 890 m | MPC · JPL |
| 296532 | 2009 OW_{10} | — | July 28, 2009 | Catalina | CSS | · | 2.8 km | MPC · JPL |
| 296533 | 2009 OM_{12} | — | July 27, 2009 | Kitt Peak | Spacewatch | · | 4.2 km | MPC · JPL |
| 296534 | 2009 OG_{16} | — | July 28, 2009 | Kitt Peak | Spacewatch | · | 1.6 km | MPC · JPL |
| 296535 | 2009 OA_{18} | — | July 28, 2009 | Kitt Peak | Spacewatch | · | 1.2 km | MPC · JPL |
| 296536 | 2009 OC_{18} | — | July 28, 2009 | Kitt Peak | Spacewatch | · | 1.0 km | MPC · JPL |
| 296537 | 2009 OK_{19} | — | July 28, 2009 | Kitt Peak | Spacewatch | · | 3.8 km | MPC · JPL |
| 296538 | 2009 OF_{20} | — | July 29, 2009 | La Sagra | OAM | · | 4.6 km | MPC · JPL |
| 296539 | 2009 OM_{22} | — | July 25, 2009 | La Sagra | OAM | NAE | 3.3 km | MPC · JPL |
| 296540 | 2009 OE_{23} | — | July 20, 2009 | Siding Spring | SSS | · | 2.6 km | MPC · JPL |
| 296541 | 2009 OP_{23} | — | July 28, 2009 | Kitt Peak | Spacewatch | (1118) | 4.5 km | MPC · JPL |
| 296542 | 2009 OY_{24} | — | July 24, 2009 | Socorro | LINEAR | · | 1.8 km | MPC · JPL |
| 296543 | 2009 PA_{1} | — | August 11, 2009 | Socorro | LINEAR | · | 2.7 km | MPC · JPL |
| 296544 | 2009 PC_{2} | — | August 15, 2009 | Mayhill | Lowe, A. | · | 1.7 km | MPC · JPL |
| 296545 | 2009 PH_{5} | — | August 15, 2009 | La Sagra | OAM | HIL · 3:2 | 6.5 km | MPC · JPL |
| 296546 | 2009 PE_{9} | — | August 15, 2009 | Kitt Peak | Spacewatch | AGN | 1.2 km | MPC · JPL |
| 296547 | 2009 PO_{10} | — | December 28, 2005 | Catalina | CSS | EOS | 2.9 km | MPC · JPL |
| 296548 | 2009 PG_{15} | — | August 15, 2009 | Catalina | CSS | · | 1.6 km | MPC · JPL |
| 296549 | 2009 PY_{19} | — | August 1, 2009 | Catalina | CSS | · | 4.7 km | MPC · JPL |
| 296550 | 2009 PV_{20} | — | August 15, 2009 | Kitt Peak | Spacewatch | · | 820 m | MPC · JPL |
| 296551 | 2009 QY_{1} | — | August 16, 2009 | Vicques | M. Ory | · | 2.2 km | MPC · JPL |
| 296552 | 2009 QR_{7} | — | August 18, 2009 | Bergisch Gladbach | W. Bickel | EOS | 2.6 km | MPC · JPL |
| 296553 | 2009 QQ_{11} | — | August 16, 2009 | La Sagra | OAM | MAS | 1.0 km | MPC · JPL |
| 296554 | 2009 QK_{15} | — | August 16, 2009 | Kitt Peak | Spacewatch | HYG | 3.3 km | MPC · JPL |
| 296555 | 2009 QZ_{16} | — | August 17, 2009 | La Sagra | OAM | 3:2 · SHU | 6.1 km | MPC · JPL |
| 296556 | 2009 QW_{23} | — | August 16, 2009 | Kitt Peak | Spacewatch | · | 1.3 km | MPC · JPL |
| 296557 | 2009 QG_{24} | — | August 16, 2009 | Kitt Peak | Spacewatch | · | 1.7 km | MPC · JPL |
| 296558 | 2009 QJ_{24} | — | August 16, 2009 | Catalina | CSS | TIN | 1.5 km | MPC · JPL |
| 296559 | 2009 QS_{26} | — | August 22, 2009 | Guidestar | Emmerich, M., Melchert, S. | · | 1.0 km | MPC · JPL |
| 296560 | 2009 QJ_{28} | — | August 20, 2009 | Drebach | Drebach | MAS | 710 m | MPC · JPL |
| 296561 | 2009 QZ_{30} | — | August 24, 2009 | La Sagra | OAM | EOS | 3.1 km | MPC · JPL |
| 296562 | 2009 QJ_{34} | — | August 25, 2009 | Modra | Gajdoš, S., Világi, J. | · | 4.1 km | MPC · JPL |
| 296563 | 2009 QS_{35} | — | August 29, 2009 | Tzec Maun | L. Elenin | · | 1.7 km | MPC · JPL |
| 296564 | 2009 QU_{37} | — | August 29, 2009 | Bergisch Gladbach | W. Bickel | · | 2.2 km | MPC · JPL |
| 296565 | 2009 QP_{40} | — | August 26, 2009 | La Sagra | OAM | MAS | 810 m | MPC · JPL |
| 296566 | 2009 QB_{43} | — | August 26, 2009 | La Sagra | OAM | · | 1.4 km | MPC · JPL |
| 296567 | 2009 QJ_{43} | — | August 27, 2009 | La Sagra | OAM | · | 2.2 km | MPC · JPL |
| 296568 | 2009 QL_{44} | — | August 27, 2009 | Kitt Peak | Spacewatch | · | 4.8 km | MPC · JPL |
| 296569 | 2009 QA_{46} | — | August 27, 2009 | Kitt Peak | Spacewatch | · | 1.9 km | MPC · JPL |
| 296570 | 2009 QN_{49} | — | November 1, 2005 | Mount Lemmon | Mount Lemmon Survey | AEO | 1.0 km | MPC · JPL |
| 296571 | 2009 QV_{51} | — | August 29, 2009 | Kitt Peak | Spacewatch | · | 1.6 km | MPC · JPL |
| 296572 | 2009 QD_{55} | — | August 27, 2009 | La Sagra | OAM | VER | 3.5 km | MPC · JPL |
| 296573 | 2009 QT_{55} | — | August 27, 2009 | Kitt Peak | Spacewatch | KOR | 1.5 km | MPC · JPL |
| 296574 | 2009 QU_{55} | — | August 27, 2009 | Kitt Peak | Spacewatch | THM | 1.8 km | MPC · JPL |
| 296575 | 2009 QJ_{58} | — | August 16, 2009 | Kitt Peak | Spacewatch | · | 1.7 km | MPC · JPL |
| 296576 | 2009 QC_{59} | — | August 27, 2009 | Kitt Peak | Spacewatch | · | 2.3 km | MPC · JPL |
| 296577 Arkhangelsk | 2009 RV_{2} | Arkhangelsk | September 11, 2009 | Zelenchukskaya Stn | T. V. Krjačko | · | 3.9 km | MPC · JPL |
| 296578 | 2009 RB_{6} | — | September 13, 2009 | Dauban | Kugel, F. | · | 3.8 km | MPC · JPL |
| 296579 | 2009 RC_{6} | — | September 13, 2009 | Dauban | Kugel, F. | NYS | 1.5 km | MPC · JPL |
| 296580 | 2009 RT_{7} | — | September 11, 2009 | La Sagra | OAM | · | 2.3 km | MPC · JPL |
| 296581 | 2009 RU_{8} | — | September 12, 2009 | Kitt Peak | Spacewatch | L4 · ERY | 9.8 km | MPC · JPL |
| 296582 | 2009 RM_{11} | — | September 12, 2009 | Kitt Peak | Spacewatch | THM | 2.3 km | MPC · JPL |
| 296583 | 2009 RD_{14} | — | September 12, 2009 | Kitt Peak | Spacewatch | · | 1.3 km | MPC · JPL |
| 296584 | 2009 RQ_{16} | — | September 12, 2009 | Kitt Peak | Spacewatch | · | 3.5 km | MPC · JPL |
| 296585 | 2009 RZ_{18} | — | September 13, 2009 | Purple Mountain | PMO NEO Survey Program | · | 2.0 km | MPC · JPL |
| 296586 | 2009 RB_{25} | — | September 15, 2009 | Kitt Peak | Spacewatch | MAS | 770 m | MPC · JPL |
| 296587 Ocaña | 2009 RA_{26} | Ocaña | September 13, 2009 | ESA OGS | ESA OGS | · | 2.5 km | MPC · JPL |
| 296588 | 2009 RW_{30} | — | September 14, 2009 | Kitt Peak | Spacewatch | L4 | 10 km | MPC · JPL |
| 296589 | 2009 RN_{31} | — | September 14, 2009 | Kitt Peak | Spacewatch | · | 4.8 km | MPC · JPL |
| 296590 | 2009 RV_{31} | — | September 14, 2009 | Kitt Peak | Spacewatch | · | 1.4 km | MPC · JPL |
| 296591 | 2009 RZ_{31} | — | September 14, 2009 | Kitt Peak | Spacewatch | · | 1.9 km | MPC · JPL |
| 296592 | 2009 RA_{33} | — | September 14, 2009 | Kitt Peak | Spacewatch | L4 | 10 km | MPC · JPL |
| 296593 | 2009 RO_{34} | — | September 14, 2009 | Kitt Peak | Spacewatch | · | 1.3 km | MPC · JPL |
| 296594 | 2009 RG_{46} | — | September 15, 2009 | Kitt Peak | Spacewatch | · | 1.9 km | MPC · JPL |
| 296595 | 2009 RV_{50} | — | September 15, 2009 | Kitt Peak | Spacewatch | · | 3.5 km | MPC · JPL |
| 296596 | 2009 RD_{52} | — | September 15, 2009 | Kitt Peak | Spacewatch | · | 2.3 km | MPC · JPL |
| 296597 | 2009 RF_{52} | — | September 15, 2009 | Kitt Peak | Spacewatch | · | 3.0 km | MPC · JPL |
| 296598 | 2009 RA_{55} | — | September 15, 2009 | Kitt Peak | Spacewatch | THM | 2.5 km | MPC · JPL |
| 296599 | 2009 RH_{55} | — | September 15, 2009 | Kitt Peak | Spacewatch | HOF | 2.8 km | MPC · JPL |
| 296600 | 2009 RC_{56} | — | September 15, 2009 | Kitt Peak | Spacewatch | · | 2.9 km | MPC · JPL |

== 296601–296700 ==
back to top

| Designation | | | Discovery | | | Properties | | Ref |
| Permanent | Provisional | Named after | Date | Site | Discoverer(s) | Category | Diam. | Ref |
|---|---|---|---|---|---|---|---|---|
| 296601 | 2009 RE_{57} | — | September 15, 2009 | Kitt Peak | Spacewatch | · | 3.7 km | MPC · JPL |
| 296602 | 2009 RL_{60} | — | September 14, 2009 | Catalina | CSS | · | 2.1 km | MPC · JPL |
| 296603 | 2009 RG_{62} | — | September 15, 2009 | Kitt Peak | Spacewatch | L4 | 10 km | MPC · JPL |
| 296604 | 2009 RT_{63} | — | September 15, 2009 | Kitt Peak | Spacewatch | L4 · ERY | 10 km | MPC · JPL |
| 296605 | 2009 RV_{69} | — | September 15, 2009 | Kitt Peak | Spacewatch | EOS | 2.6 km | MPC · JPL |
| 296606 | 2009 RC_{70} | — | September 14, 2009 | Kitt Peak | Spacewatch | · | 4.3 km | MPC · JPL |
| 296607 | 2009 RV_{70} | — | September 15, 2009 | Kitt Peak | Spacewatch | NYS | 1.3 km | MPC · JPL |
| 296608 | 2009 RM_{73} | — | November 10, 2005 | Mount Lemmon | Mount Lemmon Survey | · | 1.6 km | MPC · JPL |
| 296609 | 2009 RA_{75} | — | September 14, 2009 | Socorro | LINEAR | · | 850 m | MPC · JPL |
| 296610 | 2009 SV_{12} | — | September 16, 2009 | Mount Lemmon | Mount Lemmon Survey | · | 1.7 km | MPC · JPL |
| 296611 | 2009 SH_{13} | — | September 16, 2009 | Mount Lemmon | Mount Lemmon Survey | · | 2.8 km | MPC · JPL |
| 296612 | 2009 SA_{19} | — | September 18, 2009 | Nazaret | Muler, G. | · | 920 m | MPC · JPL |
| 296613 | 2009 SY_{20} | — | September 16, 2009 | Mount Lemmon | Mount Lemmon Survey | · | 2.7 km | MPC · JPL |
| 296614 | 2009 SC_{21} | — | September 17, 2009 | Catalina | CSS | · | 830 m | MPC · JPL |
| 296615 | 2009 SL_{21} | — | September 21, 2009 | Bergisch Gladbach | W. Bickel | · | 2.8 km | MPC · JPL |
| 296616 | 2009 SX_{28} | — | September 16, 2009 | Kitt Peak | Spacewatch | · | 2.0 km | MPC · JPL |
| 296617 | 2009 SW_{30} | — | September 16, 2009 | Kitt Peak | Spacewatch | · | 2.8 km | MPC · JPL |
| 296618 | 2009 SY_{30} | — | September 16, 2009 | Kitt Peak | Spacewatch | WIT | 860 m | MPC · JPL |
| 296619 | 2009 SY_{35} | — | December 14, 2006 | Mount Lemmon | Mount Lemmon Survey | · | 1.5 km | MPC · JPL |
| 296620 | 2009 SJ_{40} | — | September 16, 2009 | Kitt Peak | Spacewatch | PAD | 1.5 km | MPC · JPL |
| 296621 | 2009 SQ_{43} | — | September 16, 2009 | Kitt Peak | Spacewatch | · | 1.2 km | MPC · JPL |
| 296622 | 2009 SE_{46} | — | September 16, 2009 | Kitt Peak | Spacewatch | · | 3.7 km | MPC · JPL |
| 296623 | 2009 SG_{47} | — | September 16, 2009 | Kitt Peak | Spacewatch | · | 3.4 km | MPC · JPL |
| 296624 | 2009 SP_{50} | — | September 17, 2009 | Mount Lemmon | Mount Lemmon Survey | · | 1.7 km | MPC · JPL |
| 296625 | 2009 SY_{50} | — | September 17, 2009 | Kitt Peak | Spacewatch | NYS | 1.0 km | MPC · JPL |
| 296626 | 2009 SO_{53} | — | September 17, 2009 | Catalina | CSS | · | 1.1 km | MPC · JPL |
| 296627 | 2009 SU_{54} | — | September 17, 2009 | Mount Lemmon | Mount Lemmon Survey | · | 1.8 km | MPC · JPL |
| 296628 | 2009 SN_{58} | — | September 17, 2009 | Kitt Peak | Spacewatch | L4 | 9.8 km | MPC · JPL |
| 296629 | 2009 SX_{59} | — | September 17, 2009 | Kitt Peak | Spacewatch | · | 840 m | MPC · JPL |
| 296630 | 2009 SK_{60} | — | September 17, 2009 | Kitt Peak | Spacewatch | VER | 4.1 km | MPC · JPL |
| 296631 | 2009 SG_{61} | — | September 17, 2009 | Kitt Peak | Spacewatch | · | 900 m | MPC · JPL |
| 296632 | 2009 SZ_{65} | — | September 17, 2009 | Kitt Peak | Spacewatch | · | 1.7 km | MPC · JPL |
| 296633 | 2009 SA_{70} | — | September 17, 2009 | Mount Lemmon | Mount Lemmon Survey | · | 2.2 km | MPC · JPL |
| 296634 | 2009 SX_{70} | — | September 17, 2009 | Kitt Peak | Spacewatch | L4 | 13 km | MPC · JPL |
| 296635 | 2009 SA_{75} | — | September 17, 2009 | Kitt Peak | Spacewatch | · | 1.3 km | MPC · JPL |
| 296636 | 2009 SR_{75} | — | September 17, 2009 | Kitt Peak | Spacewatch | · | 3.7 km | MPC · JPL |
| 296637 | 2009 SR_{87} | — | September 18, 2009 | Kitt Peak | Spacewatch | MRX | 960 m | MPC · JPL |
| 296638 Sergeibelov | 2009 SD_{101} | Sergeibelov | September 23, 2009 | Zelenchukskaya Stn | T. V. Krjačko | · | 5.1 km | MPC · JPL |
| 296639 | 2009 SA_{102} | — | September 23, 2009 | Dauban | Kugel, F. | V | 920 m | MPC · JPL |
| 296640 | 2009 SA_{107} | — | September 16, 2009 | Mount Lemmon | Mount Lemmon Survey | 3:2 | 5.7 km | MPC · JPL |
| 296641 | 2009 ST_{109} | — | September 17, 2009 | Kitt Peak | Spacewatch | · | 2.4 km | MPC · JPL |
| 296642 | 2009 SE_{115} | — | September 18, 2009 | Kitt Peak | Spacewatch | CYB | 3.7 km | MPC · JPL |
| 296643 | 2009 SF_{115} | — | September 18, 2009 | Kitt Peak | Spacewatch | · | 3.1 km | MPC · JPL |
| 296644 | 2009 SE_{118} | — | September 18, 2009 | Kitt Peak | Spacewatch | AGN | 1.3 km | MPC · JPL |
| 296645 | 2009 SG_{119} | — | September 18, 2009 | Kitt Peak | Spacewatch | · | 920 m | MPC · JPL |
| 296646 | 2009 SY_{119} | — | September 18, 2009 | Kitt Peak | Spacewatch | · | 1.7 km | MPC · JPL |
| 296647 | 2009 SR_{120} | — | September 18, 2009 | Kitt Peak | Spacewatch | AGN | 1.3 km | MPC · JPL |
| 296648 | 2009 SG_{122} | — | September 18, 2009 | Kitt Peak | Spacewatch | L4 | 10 km | MPC · JPL |
| 296649 | 2009 SH_{124} | — | September 18, 2009 | Kitt Peak | Spacewatch | · | 3.8 km | MPC · JPL |
| 296650 | 2009 SC_{129} | — | September 18, 2009 | Kitt Peak | Spacewatch | · | 1.9 km | MPC · JPL |
| 296651 | 2009 SH_{130} | — | September 18, 2009 | Kitt Peak | Spacewatch | KOR | 1.6 km | MPC · JPL |
| 296652 | 2009 SC_{133} | — | September 18, 2009 | Kitt Peak | Spacewatch | · | 2.2 km | MPC · JPL |
| 296653 | 2009 SN_{135} | — | September 18, 2009 | Kitt Peak | Spacewatch | · | 2.7 km | MPC · JPL |
| 296654 | 2009 SW_{135} | — | September 18, 2009 | Kitt Peak | Spacewatch | L4 | 7.9 km | MPC · JPL |
| 296655 | 2009 SS_{136} | — | September 18, 2009 | Kitt Peak | Spacewatch | KOR | 1.2 km | MPC · JPL |
| 296656 | 2009 SD_{139} | — | September 18, 2009 | Purple Mountain | PMO NEO Survey Program | · | 2.7 km | MPC · JPL |
| 296657 | 2009 SY_{141} | — | September 19, 2009 | Kitt Peak | Spacewatch | · | 1.2 km | MPC · JPL |
| 296658 | 2009 SS_{143} | — | September 19, 2009 | Kitt Peak | Spacewatch | · | 1.3 km | MPC · JPL |
| 296659 | 2009 SZ_{143} | — | September 19, 2009 | Kitt Peak | Spacewatch | KOR | 1.5 km | MPC · JPL |
| 296660 | 2009 ST_{149} | — | September 20, 2009 | Kitt Peak | Spacewatch | CYB | 5.4 km | MPC · JPL |
| 296661 | 2009 SK_{151} | — | September 20, 2009 | Kitt Peak | Spacewatch | · | 2.3 km | MPC · JPL |
| 296662 | 2009 SH_{153} | — | March 14, 2007 | Kitt Peak | Spacewatch | · | 1.7 km | MPC · JPL |
| 296663 | 2009 SO_{154} | — | September 20, 2009 | Kitt Peak | Spacewatch | · | 2.3 km | MPC · JPL |
| 296664 | 2009 SQ_{155} | — | September 20, 2009 | Kitt Peak | Spacewatch | L4 | 9.5 km | MPC · JPL |
| 296665 | 2009 SS_{155} | — | September 20, 2009 | Kitt Peak | Spacewatch | L4 | 10 km | MPC · JPL |
| 296666 | 2009 SQ_{156} | — | September 20, 2009 | Kitt Peak | Spacewatch | L4 | 10 km | MPC · JPL |
| 296667 | 2009 SM_{159} | — | September 20, 2009 | Kitt Peak | Spacewatch | L4 | 10 km | MPC · JPL |
| 296668 | 2009 SY_{159} | — | September 20, 2009 | Kitt Peak | Spacewatch | AEO | 1.3 km | MPC · JPL |
| 296669 | 2009 SG_{163} | — | September 21, 2009 | Mount Lemmon | Mount Lemmon Survey | THM | 3.0 km | MPC · JPL |
| 296670 | 2009 SW_{163} | — | September 21, 2009 | Kitt Peak | Spacewatch | PAD | 2.6 km | MPC · JPL |
| 296671 | 2009 SP_{170} | — | September 23, 2009 | Mount Lemmon | Mount Lemmon Survey | L4 | 9.2 km | MPC · JPL |
| 296672 | 2009 SU_{173} | — | September 18, 2009 | Catalina | CSS | L4 | 20 km | MPC · JPL |
| 296673 | 2009 ST_{183} | — | September 21, 2009 | Kitt Peak | Spacewatch | · | 1.8 km | MPC · JPL |
| 296674 | 2009 SH_{188} | — | September 21, 2009 | Kitt Peak | Spacewatch | L4 | 10 km | MPC · JPL |
| 296675 | 2009 SS_{189} | — | September 22, 2009 | Kitt Peak | Spacewatch | · | 2.7 km | MPC · JPL |
| 296676 | 2009 ST_{191} | — | September 22, 2009 | Kitt Peak | Spacewatch | · | 3.3 km | MPC · JPL |
| 296677 | 2009 SA_{208} | — | September 23, 2009 | Kitt Peak | Spacewatch | · | 1.0 km | MPC · JPL |
| 296678 | 2009 SQ_{209} | — | September 23, 2009 | Mount Lemmon | Mount Lemmon Survey | NYS | 1.3 km | MPC · JPL |
| 296679 | 2009 SD_{211} | — | September 23, 2009 | Kitt Peak | Spacewatch | · | 2.7 km | MPC · JPL |
| 296680 | 2009 SA_{212} | — | September 23, 2009 | Kitt Peak | Spacewatch | · | 660 m | MPC · JPL |
| 296681 | 2009 SZ_{213} | — | September 23, 2009 | Kitt Peak | Spacewatch | · | 1.2 km | MPC · JPL |
| 296682 | 2009 SM_{218} | — | August 21, 2008 | Kitt Peak | Spacewatch | L4 | 10 km | MPC · JPL |
| 296683 | 2009 SS_{227} | — | September 26, 2009 | Kitt Peak | Spacewatch | L4 | 8.9 km | MPC · JPL |
| 296684 | 2009 SS_{229} | — | September 16, 2009 | Kitt Peak | Spacewatch | · | 780 m | MPC · JPL |
| 296685 | 2009 SW_{235} | — | September 19, 2009 | Kitt Peak | Spacewatch | · | 2.3 km | MPC · JPL |
| 296686 | 2009 SN_{236} | — | September 16, 2009 | Catalina | CSS | · | 2.6 km | MPC · JPL |
| 296687 | 2009 SU_{238} | — | September 16, 2009 | Catalina | CSS | · | 2.9 km | MPC · JPL |
| 296688 | 2009 SF_{240} | — | September 17, 2009 | Catalina | CSS | · | 2.7 km | MPC · JPL |
| 296689 | 2009 SD_{242} | — | September 21, 2009 | Catalina | CSS | EOS | 3.3 km | MPC · JPL |
| 296690 | 2009 SM_{245} | — | September 16, 2009 | Kitt Peak | Spacewatch | L4 | 10 km | MPC · JPL |
| 296691 | 2009 SC_{246} | — | September 17, 2009 | Kitt Peak | Spacewatch | L4 | 10 km | MPC · JPL |
| 296692 | 2009 SV_{246} | — | September 18, 2009 | Kitt Peak | Spacewatch | L4 | 7.7 km | MPC · JPL |
| 296693 | 2009 SD_{247} | — | September 18, 2009 | Kitt Peak | Spacewatch | L4 | 10 km | MPC · JPL |
| 296694 | 2009 SV_{253} | — | September 25, 2009 | Kitt Peak | Spacewatch | L4 | 8.7 km | MPC · JPL |
| 296695 | 2009 SY_{254} | — | September 16, 2009 | Catalina | CSS | · | 1.8 km | MPC · JPL |
| 296696 | 2009 SJ_{265} | — | September 23, 2009 | Mount Lemmon | Mount Lemmon Survey | · | 4.5 km | MPC · JPL |
| 296697 | 2009 SD_{269} | — | September 24, 2009 | Mount Lemmon | Mount Lemmon Survey | NYS | 1.4 km | MPC · JPL |
| 296698 | 2009 SF_{275} | — | September 25, 2009 | Kitt Peak | Spacewatch | · | 2.6 km | MPC · JPL |
| 296699 | 2009 SY_{276} | — | September 25, 2009 | Kitt Peak | Spacewatch | · | 3.0 km | MPC · JPL |
| 296700 | 2009 SG_{277} | — | September 25, 2009 | Kitt Peak | Spacewatch | · | 1.8 km | MPC · JPL |

== 296701–296800 ==
back to top

| Designation | | | Discovery | | | Properties | | Ref |
| Permanent | Provisional | Named after | Date | Site | Discoverer(s) | Category | Diam. | Ref |
|---|---|---|---|---|---|---|---|---|
| 296701 | 2009 SS_{278} | — | September 25, 2009 | Kitt Peak | Spacewatch | EOS | 2.5 km | MPC · JPL |
| 296702 | 2009 SD_{282} | — | September 25, 2009 | Kitt Peak | Spacewatch | · | 2.8 km | MPC · JPL |
| 296703 | 2009 SZ_{284} | — | September 25, 2009 | Mount Lemmon | Mount Lemmon Survey | KOR | 1.3 km | MPC · JPL |
| 296704 | 2009 SA_{291} | — | September 25, 2009 | Kitt Peak | Spacewatch | · | 2.1 km | MPC · JPL |
| 296705 | 2009 SW_{296} | — | September 28, 2009 | Kitt Peak | Spacewatch | · | 1.7 km | MPC · JPL |
| 296706 | 2009 SG_{306} | — | September 17, 2009 | Kitt Peak | Spacewatch | THM | 3.1 km | MPC · JPL |
| 296707 | 2009 SK_{313} | — | September 18, 2009 | Kitt Peak | Spacewatch | L4 | 9.1 km | MPC · JPL |
| 296708 | 2009 SN_{314} | — | November 12, 2005 | Kitt Peak | Spacewatch | · | 1.5 km | MPC · JPL |
| 296709 | 2009 SV_{320} | — | September 21, 2009 | Mount Lemmon | Mount Lemmon Survey | · | 2.0 km | MPC · JPL |
| 296710 | 2009 SX_{323} | — | September 24, 2009 | Mount Lemmon | Mount Lemmon Survey | · | 3.0 km | MPC · JPL |
| 296711 | 2009 SF_{327} | — | January 21, 2001 | Kitt Peak | Spacewatch | L4 | 12 km | MPC · JPL |
| 296712 | 2009 SA_{330} | — | September 17, 2009 | Kitt Peak | Spacewatch | EUN | 1.5 km | MPC · JPL |
| 296713 | 2009 SQ_{331} | — | September 19, 2009 | Catalina | CSS | JUN | 1.3 km | MPC · JPL |
| 296714 | 2009 SL_{335} | — | September 20, 2009 | Kitt Peak | Spacewatch | · | 650 m | MPC · JPL |
| 296715 | 2009 SQ_{337} | — | September 28, 2009 | Catalina | CSS | · | 1.7 km | MPC · JPL |
| 296716 | 2009 SP_{342} | — | September 16, 2009 | Catalina | CSS | · | 2.5 km | MPC · JPL |
| 296717 | 2009 SX_{344} | — | September 18, 2009 | Kitt Peak | Spacewatch | · | 2.3 km | MPC · JPL |
| 296718 | 2009 ST_{346} | — | September 23, 2009 | Mount Lemmon | Mount Lemmon Survey | · | 3.8 km | MPC · JPL |
| 296719 | 2009 SH_{349} | — | September 27, 2009 | Kitt Peak | Spacewatch | · | 1.8 km | MPC · JPL |
| 296720 | 2009 SX_{349} | — | September 19, 2009 | Kitt Peak | Spacewatch | L4 | 10 km | MPC · JPL |
| 296721 | 2009 SE_{351} | — | September 29, 2009 | Mount Lemmon | Mount Lemmon Survey | EOS | 2.8 km | MPC · JPL |
| 296722 | 2009 SJ_{352} | — | September 20, 2009 | Kitt Peak | Spacewatch | · | 2.8 km | MPC · JPL |
| 296723 | 2009 SD_{353} | — | September 28, 2009 | Kitt Peak | Spacewatch | · | 2.4 km | MPC · JPL |
| 296724 | 2009 SL_{353} | — | September 22, 2009 | Mount Lemmon | Mount Lemmon Survey | URS | 4.3 km | MPC · JPL |
| 296725 | 2009 SW_{354} | — | September 28, 2009 | Mount Lemmon | Mount Lemmon Survey | L4 | 10 km | MPC · JPL |
| 296726 | 2009 SA_{356} | — | September 24, 2009 | Kitt Peak | Spacewatch | L4 | 8.2 km | MPC · JPL |
| 296727 | 2009 SO_{359} | — | September 23, 2009 | Catalina | CSS | LUT | 6.7 km | MPC · JPL |
| 296728 | 2009 SQ_{360} | — | September 30, 2009 | Mount Lemmon | Mount Lemmon Survey | HOF | 3.7 km | MPC · JPL |
| 296729 | 2009 SF_{361} | — | September 28, 2009 | Catalina | CSS | · | 4.1 km | MPC · JPL |
| 296730 | 2009 TD_{3} | — | October 9, 2009 | Catalina | CSS | DOR | 2.6 km | MPC · JPL |
| 296731 | 2009 TK_{10} | — | October 14, 2009 | Nazaret | Muler, G. | · | 5.5 km | MPC · JPL |
| 296732 | 2009 TP_{11} | — | October 14, 2009 | Bergisch Gladbach | W. Bickel | · | 2.5 km | MPC · JPL |
| 296733 | 2009 TT_{14} | — | October 13, 2009 | La Sagra | OAM | · | 1.7 km | MPC · JPL |
| 296734 | 2009 TH_{16} | — | October 10, 2009 | La Sagra | OAM | NYS | 910 m | MPC · JPL |
| 296735 | 2009 TT_{17} | — | October 15, 2009 | Catalina | CSS | EOS | 3.5 km | MPC · JPL |
| 296736 | 2009 TH_{20} | — | October 11, 2009 | La Sagra | OAM | · | 4.2 km | MPC · JPL |
| 296737 | 2009 TS_{20} | — | October 11, 2009 | La Sagra | OAM | · | 1.1 km | MPC · JPL |
| 296738 | 2009 TO_{25} | — | October 14, 2009 | Mount Lemmon | Mount Lemmon Survey | L4 | 10 km | MPC · JPL |
| 296739 | 2009 TY_{26} | — | February 10, 2008 | Kitt Peak | Spacewatch | · | 1.1 km | MPC · JPL |
| 296740 | 2009 TD_{31} | — | August 22, 2004 | Kitt Peak | Spacewatch | · | 2.3 km | MPC · JPL |
| 296741 | 2009 TO_{34} | — | October 12, 2009 | La Sagra | OAM | AGN | 1.5 km | MPC · JPL |
| 296742 | 2009 TR_{35} | — | October 14, 2009 | La Sagra | OAM | · | 3.0 km | MPC · JPL |
| 296743 | 2009 TQ_{41} | — | October 14, 2009 | La Sagra | OAM | · | 2.6 km | MPC · JPL |
| 296744 | 2009 TZ_{43} | — | October 14, 2009 | Mount Lemmon | Mount Lemmon Survey | · | 3.0 km | MPC · JPL |
| 296745 | 2009 TL_{46} | — | October 14, 2009 | La Sagra | OAM | L4 | 13 km | MPC · JPL |
| 296746 | 2009 UV | — | October 16, 2009 | Socorro | LINEAR | · | 2.9 km | MPC · JPL |
| 296747 | 2009 UB_{1} | — | October 17, 2009 | Tzec Maun | D. Chestnov, A. Novichonok | · | 3.1 km | MPC · JPL |
| 296748 | 2009 UT_{1} | — | October 16, 2009 | Socorro | LINEAR | · | 2.4 km | MPC · JPL |
| 296749 | 2009 UH_{12} | — | October 17, 2009 | Mount Lemmon | Mount Lemmon Survey | KOR | 1.4 km | MPC · JPL |
| 296750 | 2009 UW_{13} | — | October 19, 2009 | Socorro | LINEAR | · | 4.8 km | MPC · JPL |
| 296751 | 2009 UX_{13} | — | October 19, 2009 | Socorro | LINEAR | · | 4.4 km | MPC · JPL |
| 296752 | 2009 UB_{14} | — | October 19, 2009 | Socorro | LINEAR | EOS | 3.0 km | MPC · JPL |
| 296753 Mustafamahmoud | 2009 UP_{14} | Mustafamahmoud | October 19, 2009 | Zelenchukskaya Stn | T. V. Krjačko | · | 4.9 km | MPC · JPL |
| 296754 | 2009 UM_{24} | — | October 18, 2009 | Mount Lemmon | Mount Lemmon Survey | MAS | 680 m | MPC · JPL |
| 296755 | 2009 UV_{27} | — | October 22, 2009 | Catalina | CSS | · | 6.4 km | MPC · JPL |
| 296756 | 2009 UY_{27} | — | October 22, 2009 | Catalina | CSS | · | 5.2 km | MPC · JPL |
| 296757 | 2009 US_{29} | — | October 18, 2009 | Mount Lemmon | Mount Lemmon Survey | L4 | 14 km | MPC · JPL |
| 296758 | 2009 UM_{33} | — | October 18, 2009 | Mount Lemmon | Mount Lemmon Survey | · | 610 m | MPC · JPL |
| 296759 | 2009 UD_{34} | — | October 18, 2009 | Mount Lemmon | Mount Lemmon Survey | · | 2.2 km | MPC · JPL |
| 296760 | 2009 UP_{35} | — | October 21, 2009 | Mount Lemmon | Mount Lemmon Survey | · | 4.1 km | MPC · JPL |
| 296761 | 2009 UP_{41} | — | October 18, 2009 | Mount Lemmon | Mount Lemmon Survey | AST | 1.8 km | MPC · JPL |
| 296762 | 2009 UH_{45} | — | October 18, 2009 | Mount Lemmon | Mount Lemmon Survey | 3:2 | 4.8 km | MPC · JPL |
| 296763 | 2009 UB_{51} | — | October 22, 2009 | Catalina | CSS | L4 | 16 km | MPC · JPL |
| 296764 | 2009 UH_{68} | — | October 17, 2009 | Mount Lemmon | Mount Lemmon Survey | · | 2.5 km | MPC · JPL |
| 296765 | 2009 UR_{69} | — | October 21, 2009 | Catalina | CSS | EOS | 4.6 km | MPC · JPL |
| 296766 | 2009 UP_{76} | — | October 26, 2005 | Kitt Peak | Spacewatch | · | 1.4 km | MPC · JPL |
| 296767 | 2009 UR_{79} | — | October 22, 2009 | Mount Lemmon | Mount Lemmon Survey | · | 2.2 km | MPC · JPL |
| 296768 | 2009 UM_{80} | — | October 22, 2009 | Mount Lemmon | Mount Lemmon Survey | · | 2.9 km | MPC · JPL |
| 296769 | 2009 UQ_{82} | — | October 23, 2009 | Mount Lemmon | Mount Lemmon Survey | · | 780 m | MPC · JPL |
| 296770 | 2009 UA_{84} | — | October 23, 2009 | Mount Lemmon | Mount Lemmon Survey | EOS | 3.1 km | MPC · JPL |
| 296771 | 2009 UF_{88} | — | October 21, 2009 | Catalina | CSS | · | 4.0 km | MPC · JPL |
| 296772 | 2009 UE_{100} | — | October 23, 2009 | Mount Lemmon | Mount Lemmon Survey | · | 2.9 km | MPC · JPL |
| 296773 | 2009 UO_{103} | — | October 24, 2009 | Kitt Peak | Spacewatch | · | 2.3 km | MPC · JPL |
| 296774 | 2009 UG_{121} | — | October 24, 2009 | Purple Mountain | PMO NEO Survey Program | L4 | 10 km | MPC · JPL |
| 296775 | 2009 UW_{121} | — | October 25, 2009 | La Sagra | OAM | · | 4.4 km | MPC · JPL |
| 296776 | 2009 UG_{127} | — | October 24, 2009 | Catalina | CSS | · | 2.3 km | MPC · JPL |
| 296777 | 2009 UX_{130} | — | October 27, 2009 | Mount Lemmon | Mount Lemmon Survey | L4 | 13 km | MPC · JPL |
| 296778 | 2009 UJ_{132} | — | October 16, 2009 | Catalina | CSS | V | 800 m | MPC · JPL |
| 296779 | 2009 UW_{135} | — | October 29, 2009 | Catalina | CSS | EOS | 3.1 km | MPC · JPL |
| 296780 | 2009 UB_{140} | — | October 27, 2009 | Catalina | CSS | H | 950 m | MPC · JPL |
| 296781 | 2009 UH_{143} | — | October 18, 2009 | Mount Lemmon | Mount Lemmon Survey | · | 1.9 km | MPC · JPL |
| 296782 | 2009 UW_{148} | — | March 10, 2003 | Kitt Peak | Spacewatch | L4 | 10 km | MPC · JPL |
| 296783 | 2009 UT_{151} | — | October 16, 2009 | Socorro | LINEAR | L4 | 10 km | MPC · JPL |
| 296784 | 2009 UU_{151} | — | October 16, 2009 | Socorro | LINEAR | · | 3.6 km | MPC · JPL |
| 296785 | 2009 UA_{153} | — | October 24, 2009 | Kitt Peak | Spacewatch | · | 2.6 km | MPC · JPL |
| 296786 | 2009 UX_{153} | — | October 16, 2009 | Mount Lemmon | Mount Lemmon Survey | L4 | 10 km | MPC · JPL |
| 296787 | 2009 UR_{154} | — | October 16, 2009 | Mount Lemmon | Mount Lemmon Survey | L4 | 10 km | MPC · JPL |
| 296788 | 2009 VP_{1} | — | November 9, 2009 | Calvin-Rehoboth | L. A. Molnar | V | 800 m | MPC · JPL |
| 296789 | 2009 VX_{9} | — | November 8, 2009 | Catalina | CSS | · | 4.0 km | MPC · JPL |
| 296790 | 2009 VQ_{18} | — | November 9, 2009 | Kitt Peak | Spacewatch | · | 1.7 km | MPC · JPL |
| 296791 | 2009 VV_{18} | — | November 9, 2009 | Kitt Peak | Spacewatch | · | 2.3 km | MPC · JPL |
| 296792 | 2009 VF_{24} | — | November 9, 2009 | Mount Lemmon | Mount Lemmon Survey | · | 1.7 km | MPC · JPL |
| 296793 | 2009 VL_{25} | — | November 10, 2009 | Dauban | Kugel, F. | L4 | 18 km | MPC · JPL |
| 296794 | 2009 VS_{29} | — | November 9, 2009 | Catalina | CSS | · | 2.6 km | MPC · JPL |
| 296795 | 2009 VY_{34} | — | November 10, 2009 | Mount Lemmon | Mount Lemmon Survey | · | 2.5 km | MPC · JPL |
| 296796 | 2009 VK_{35} | — | November 10, 2009 | Mount Lemmon | Mount Lemmon Survey | · | 5.1 km | MPC · JPL |
| 296797 | 2009 VA_{38} | — | May 7, 2005 | Mount Lemmon | Mount Lemmon Survey | · | 650 m | MPC · JPL |
| 296798 | 2009 VX_{38} | — | November 9, 2009 | Kitt Peak | Spacewatch | · | 830 m | MPC · JPL |
| 296799 | 2009 VT_{41} | — | November 9, 2009 | Mount Lemmon | Mount Lemmon Survey | (5) | 1.4 km | MPC · JPL |
| 296800 | 2009 VQ_{48} | — | November 10, 2009 | Kitt Peak | Spacewatch | · | 2.1 km | MPC · JPL |

== 296801–296900 ==
back to top

| Designation | | | Discovery | | | Properties | | Ref |
| Permanent | Provisional | Named after | Date | Site | Discoverer(s) | Category | Diam. | Ref |
|---|---|---|---|---|---|---|---|---|
| 296801 | 2009 VU_{49} | — | November 11, 2009 | Mount Lemmon | Mount Lemmon Survey | (5) | 1.3 km | MPC · JPL |
| 296802 | 2009 VV_{53} | — | March 15, 2007 | Kitt Peak | Spacewatch | · | 2.6 km | MPC · JPL |
| 296803 | 2009 VU_{55} | — | November 11, 2009 | Mount Lemmon | Mount Lemmon Survey | · | 2.6 km | MPC · JPL |
| 296804 | 2009 VD_{58} | — | November 15, 2009 | Catalina | CSS | · | 3.4 km | MPC · JPL |
| 296805 | 2009 VJ_{59} | — | November 8, 2009 | Catalina | CSS | · | 2.7 km | MPC · JPL |
| 296806 | 2009 VK_{61} | — | November 8, 2009 | Kitt Peak | Spacewatch | · | 3.6 km | MPC · JPL |
| 296807 | 2009 VF_{72} | — | November 14, 2009 | Socorro | LINEAR | · | 4.0 km | MPC · JPL |
| 296808 | 2009 VO_{75} | — | November 13, 2009 | La Sagra | OAM | · | 2.7 km | MPC · JPL |
| 296809 | 2009 VC_{79} | — | November 10, 2009 | Catalina | CSS | L4 | 15 km | MPC · JPL |
| 296810 | 2009 VA_{93} | — | November 8, 2009 | Kitt Peak | Spacewatch | 3:2 · SHU | 5.5 km | MPC · JPL |
| 296811 | 2009 VX_{94} | — | November 9, 2009 | Mount Lemmon | Mount Lemmon Survey | · | 3.0 km | MPC · JPL |
| 296812 | 2009 VN_{100} | — | November 10, 2009 | Kitt Peak | Spacewatch | · | 4.2 km | MPC · JPL |
| 296813 | 2009 VL_{111} | — | November 12, 2009 | La Sagra | OAM | CYB | 6.3 km | MPC · JPL |
| 296814 | 2009 VF_{112} | — | November 9, 2009 | Catalina | CSS | · | 3.0 km | MPC · JPL |
| 296815 | 2009 VE_{114} | — | November 9, 2009 | Kitt Peak | Spacewatch | MAS | 790 m | MPC · JPL |
| 296816 | 2009 VR_{116} | — | November 10, 2009 | Kitt Peak | Spacewatch | EOS | 2.8 km | MPC · JPL |
| 296817 | 2009 WF_{3} | — | April 7, 2002 | Cerro Tololo | Deep Ecliptic Survey | L4 | 10 km | MPC · JPL |
| 296818 | 2009 WW_{5} | — | November 17, 2009 | Tzec Maun | D. Chestnov, A. Novichonok | · | 1.4 km | MPC · JPL |
| 296819 Artesian | 2009 WY_{6} | Artesian | November 17, 2009 | Zelenchukskaya Stn | T. V. Krjačko | · | 1.9 km | MPC · JPL |
| 296820 Paju | 2009 WT_{7} | Paju | November 18, 2009 | Vicques | M. Ory | · | 1.8 km | MPC · JPL |
| 296821 | 2009 WX_{10} | — | November 19, 2009 | Drebach | Drebach | · | 4.5 km | MPC · JPL |
| 296822 | 2009 WP_{24} | — | January 7, 2005 | Campo Imperatore | CINEOS | · | 3.9 km | MPC · JPL |
| 296823 | 2009 WB_{25} | — | November 21, 2009 | Mayhill | Lowe, A. | KRM | 3.9 km | MPC · JPL |
| 296824 | 2009 WK_{28} | — | November 16, 2009 | Kitt Peak | Spacewatch | · | 890 m | MPC · JPL |
| 296825 | 2009 WG_{36} | — | November 17, 2009 | Kitt Peak | Spacewatch | · | 4.0 km | MPC · JPL |
| 296826 | 2009 WH_{36} | — | November 17, 2009 | Kitt Peak | Spacewatch | · | 1.8 km | MPC · JPL |
| 296827 | 2009 WM_{37} | — | November 17, 2009 | Kitt Peak | Spacewatch | AGN | 1.2 km | MPC · JPL |
| 296828 | 2009 WC_{40} | — | November 17, 2009 | Kitt Peak | Spacewatch | NYS | 1.3 km | MPC · JPL |
| 296829 | 2009 WJ_{40} | — | November 17, 2009 | Kitt Peak | Spacewatch | · | 1.6 km | MPC · JPL |
| 296830 | 2009 WG_{46} | — | November 18, 2009 | Goodricke-Pigott | R. A. Tucker | · | 3.3 km | MPC · JPL |
| 296831 | 2009 WW_{47} | — | November 19, 2009 | Mount Lemmon | Mount Lemmon Survey | VER | 5.6 km | MPC · JPL |
| 296832 | 2009 WZ_{48} | — | November 19, 2009 | Catalina | CSS | · | 3.7 km | MPC · JPL |
| 296833 | 2009 WY_{49} | — | November 19, 2009 | Kitt Peak | Spacewatch | HNS | 1.6 km | MPC · JPL |
| 296834 | 2009 WA_{64} | — | November 16, 2009 | Catalina | CSS | EUP | 6.3 km | MPC · JPL |
| 296835 | 2009 WX_{66} | — | November 17, 2009 | Mount Lemmon | Mount Lemmon Survey | THM | 2.8 km | MPC · JPL |
| 296836 | 2009 WS_{68} | — | November 17, 2009 | Mount Lemmon | Mount Lemmon Survey | · | 1.3 km | MPC · JPL |
| 296837 | 2009 WO_{71} | — | November 18, 2009 | Kitt Peak | Spacewatch | · | 3.7 km | MPC · JPL |
| 296838 | 2009 WB_{73} | — | November 18, 2009 | Kitt Peak | Spacewatch | · | 4.3 km | MPC · JPL |
| 296839 | 2009 WF_{77} | — | November 18, 2009 | Kitt Peak | Spacewatch | · | 1.8 km | MPC · JPL |
| 296840 | 2009 WW_{78} | — | November 18, 2009 | Mount Lemmon | Mount Lemmon Survey | AST | 2.0 km | MPC · JPL |
| 296841 | 2009 WL_{79} | — | November 18, 2009 | Kitt Peak | Spacewatch | · | 3.1 km | MPC · JPL |
| 296842 | 2009 WT_{83} | — | November 19, 2009 | Kitt Peak | Spacewatch | · | 4.3 km | MPC · JPL |
| 296843 | 2009 WK_{84} | — | November 19, 2009 | Kitt Peak | Spacewatch | · | 3.8 km | MPC · JPL |
| 296844 | 2009 WN_{84} | — | November 19, 2009 | Kitt Peak | Spacewatch | · | 1.1 km | MPC · JPL |
| 296845 | 2009 WG_{88} | — | November 19, 2009 | Kitt Peak | Spacewatch | · | 3.9 km | MPC · JPL |
| 296846 | 2009 WA_{107} | — | November 17, 2009 | Kitt Peak | Spacewatch | NAE | 3.3 km | MPC · JPL |
| 296847 | 2009 WR_{115} | — | November 19, 2009 | Kitt Peak | Spacewatch | · | 2.9 km | MPC · JPL |
| 296848 | 2009 WJ_{169} | — | November 22, 2009 | Kitt Peak | Spacewatch | · | 2.5 km | MPC · JPL |
| 296849 | 2009 WF_{172} | — | November 22, 2009 | Mount Lemmon | Mount Lemmon Survey | · | 5.2 km | MPC · JPL |
| 296850 | 2009 WP_{176} | — | November 23, 2009 | Kitt Peak | Spacewatch | · | 3.5 km | MPC · JPL |
| 296851 | 2009 WJ_{182} | — | November 23, 2009 | Kitt Peak | Spacewatch | · | 4.5 km | MPC · JPL |
| 296852 | 2009 WV_{184} | — | November 23, 2009 | La Sagra | OAM | · | 2.5 km | MPC · JPL |
| 296853 | 2009 WC_{185} | — | November 24, 2009 | Kitt Peak | Spacewatch | L4 | 8.9 km | MPC · JPL |
| 296854 | 2009 WP_{188} | — | November 24, 2009 | Mount Lemmon | Mount Lemmon Survey | V | 700 m | MPC · JPL |
| 296855 | 2009 WG_{198} | — | November 25, 2009 | Mount Lemmon | Mount Lemmon Survey | V | 940 m | MPC · JPL |
| 296856 | 2009 WK_{204} | — | November 17, 2009 | Kitt Peak | Spacewatch | · | 2.6 km | MPC · JPL |
| 296857 | 2009 WM_{206} | — | November 17, 2009 | Kitt Peak | Spacewatch | GEF | 1.8 km | MPC · JPL |
| 296858 | 2009 WA_{207} | — | November 17, 2009 | Kitt Peak | Spacewatch | · | 1.6 km | MPC · JPL |
| 296859 | 2009 WA_{215} | — | November 21, 2009 | Mount Lemmon | Mount Lemmon Survey | · | 2.5 km | MPC · JPL |
| 296860 | 2009 WU_{225} | — | November 17, 2009 | Mount Lemmon | Mount Lemmon Survey | 3:2 · SHU | 5.8 km | MPC · JPL |
| 296861 | 2009 WU_{241} | — | November 18, 2009 | Mount Lemmon | Mount Lemmon Survey | · | 2.4 km | MPC · JPL |
| 296862 | 2009 WN_{259} | — | November 27, 2009 | Catalina | CSS | H | 960 m | MPC · JPL |
| 296863 | 2009 WW_{260} | — | November 25, 2009 | Kitt Peak | Spacewatch | · | 3.6 km | MPC · JPL |
| 296864 | 2009 WY_{261} | — | November 17, 2009 | Kitt Peak | Spacewatch | (159) | 4.0 km | MPC · JPL |
| 296865 | 2009 WP_{262} | — | November 21, 2009 | Socorro | LINEAR | · | 6.5 km | MPC · JPL |
| 296866 | 2009 XB_{7} | — | December 12, 2009 | Pingelly | D. Chestnov, A. Novichonok | EOS | 2.6 km | MPC · JPL |
| 296867 | 2009 XC_{9} | — | December 10, 2009 | Socorro | LINEAR | · | 1.4 km | MPC · JPL |
| 296868 | 2009 XL_{9} | — | December 11, 2009 | Socorro | LINEAR | (194) | 2.5 km | MPC · JPL |
| 296869 | 2009 XD_{10} | — | December 10, 2009 | Mount Lemmon | Mount Lemmon Survey | · | 2.0 km | MPC · JPL |
| 296870 | 2009 XP_{14} | — | December 15, 2009 | Mount Lemmon | Mount Lemmon Survey | · | 1.3 km | MPC · JPL |
| 296871 | 2009 YN_{6} | — | December 16, 2009 | Mayhill | Lowe, A. | EOS | 3.1 km | MPC · JPL |
| 296872 | 2009 YO_{6} | — | December 17, 2009 | Hibiscus | Teamo, N. | · | 2.3 km | MPC · JPL |
| 296873 | 2009 YV_{19} | — | December 25, 2009 | Kitt Peak | Spacewatch | MAS | 860 m | MPC · JPL |
| 296874 | 2009 YY_{21} | — | December 26, 2009 | Kitt Peak | Spacewatch | · | 4.5 km | MPC · JPL |
| 296875 | 2010 AT_{5} | — | January 5, 2010 | Kitt Peak | Spacewatch | · | 1.6 km | MPC · JPL |
| 296876 | 2010 AS_{12} | — | January 6, 2010 | Catalina | CSS | (5) | 1.2 km | MPC · JPL |
| 296877 | 2010 AR_{19} | — | January 7, 2010 | Mount Lemmon | Mount Lemmon Survey | · | 1.6 km | MPC · JPL |
| 296878 | 2010 AU_{31} | — | January 6, 2010 | Kitt Peak | Spacewatch | · | 1.9 km | MPC · JPL |
| 296879 | 2010 AK_{32} | — | January 6, 2010 | Kitt Peak | Spacewatch | MAS | 1.2 km | MPC · JPL |
| 296880 | 2010 AZ_{39} | — | January 7, 2010 | Socorro | LINEAR | · | 3.5 km | MPC · JPL |
| 296881 | 2010 AM_{40} | — | January 9, 2010 | Tzec Maun | Tozzi, F. | · | 6.0 km | MPC · JPL |
| 296882 | 2010 AU_{40} | — | January 5, 2010 | Kitt Peak | Spacewatch | (32418) | 2.6 km | MPC · JPL |
| 296883 | 2010 AD_{52} | — | January 8, 2010 | Mount Lemmon | Mount Lemmon Survey | CYB | 4.6 km | MPC · JPL |
| 296884 | 2010 AH_{54} | — | January 8, 2010 | Kitt Peak | Spacewatch | · | 2.6 km | MPC · JPL |
| 296885 | 2010 AU_{55} | — | January 8, 2010 | Kitt Peak | Spacewatch | ADE | 2.9 km | MPC · JPL |
| 296886 | 2010 AF_{79} | — | January 11, 2010 | Kitt Peak | Spacewatch | · | 1.9 km | MPC · JPL |
| 296887 | 2010 AB_{88} | — | April 13, 2004 | Kitt Peak | Spacewatch | L4 | 15 km | MPC · JPL |
| 296888 | 2010 BM_{1} | — | January 17, 2010 | Dauban | Kugel, F. | · | 1.9 km | MPC · JPL |
| 296889 | 2010 BC_{4} | — | January 23, 2010 | Bisei SG Center | BATTeRS | GEF | 1.7 km | MPC · JPL |
| 296890 | 2010 BA_{5} | — | January 21, 2010 | Bisei SG Center | BATTeRS | · | 4.7 km | MPC · JPL |
| 296891 | 2010 BS_{9} | — | January 16, 2010 | WISE | WISE | · | 4.5 km | MPC · JPL |
| 296892 | 2010 BF_{25} | — | January 17, 2010 | WISE | WISE | · | 5.0 km | MPC · JPL |
| 296893 | 2010 BV_{36} | — | January 18, 2010 | WISE | WISE | EOS | 3.0 km | MPC · JPL |
| 296894 | 2010 BP_{39} | — | January 19, 2010 | WISE | WISE | · | 4.6 km | MPC · JPL |
| 296895 | 2010 BS_{46} | — | January 19, 2010 | WISE | WISE | · | 3.0 km | MPC · JPL |
| 296896 | 2010 BN_{105} | — | January 28, 2010 | WISE | WISE | · | 7.0 km | MPC · JPL |
| 296897 | 2010 CH_{3} | — | February 5, 2010 | Kitt Peak | Spacewatch | · | 1.0 km | MPC · JPL |
| 296898 | 2010 CJ_{4} | — | January 23, 2006 | Piszkéstető | K. Sárneczky | NYS | 1.6 km | MPC · JPL |
| 296899 | 2010 CO_{7} | — | February 6, 2010 | WISE | WISE | TIR · | 4.7 km | MPC · JPL |
| 296900 | 2010 CY_{9} | — | February 8, 2010 | WISE | WISE | KON | 3.2 km | MPC · JPL |

== 296901–297000 ==
back to top

| Designation | | | Discovery | | | Properties | | Ref |
| Permanent | Provisional | Named after | Date | Site | Discoverer(s) | Category | Diam. | Ref |
|---|---|---|---|---|---|---|---|---|
| 296901 | 2010 CL_{12} | — | February 12, 2010 | Mayhill | Mayhill | · | 1.7 km | MPC · JPL |
| 296902 | 2010 CN_{13} | — | February 10, 2010 | WISE | WISE | · | 2.2 km | MPC · JPL |
| 296903 | 2010 CK_{16} | — | February 11, 2010 | WISE | WISE | HOF | 3.2 km | MPC · JPL |
| 296904 | 2010 CH_{29} | — | February 9, 2010 | Kitt Peak | Spacewatch | · | 1.3 km | MPC · JPL |
| 296905 Korochantsev | 2010 CJ_{36} | Korochantsev | February 10, 2010 | Zelenchukskaya Stn | T. V. Krjačko | · | 600 m | MPC · JPL |
| 296906 | 2010 CO_{51} | — | February 13, 2010 | WISE | WISE | · | 3.4 km | MPC · JPL |
| 296907 Alexander | 2010 CA_{52} | Alexander | February 13, 2010 | WISE | WISE | VER | 6.1 km | MPC · JPL |
| 296908 | 2010 CM_{55} | — | February 9, 2010 | Socorro | LINEAR | · | 1.5 km | MPC · JPL |
| 296909 | 2010 CO_{55} | — | February 12, 2010 | Socorro | LINEAR | · | 5.2 km | MPC · JPL |
| 296910 | 2010 CQ_{68} | — | February 10, 2010 | Kitt Peak | Spacewatch | · | 2.0 km | MPC · JPL |
| 296911 | 2010 CT_{75} | — | February 13, 2010 | Catalina | CSS | · | 1.8 km | MPC · JPL |
| 296912 | 2010 CX_{75} | — | February 13, 2010 | Catalina | CSS | · | 1.2 km | MPC · JPL |
| 296913 | 2010 CY_{77} | — | February 13, 2010 | Mount Lemmon | Mount Lemmon Survey | · | 2.1 km | MPC · JPL |
| 296914 | 2010 CO_{81} | — | February 13, 2010 | Mount Lemmon | Mount Lemmon Survey | · | 3.2 km | MPC · JPL |
| 296915 | 2010 CX_{84} | — | February 14, 2010 | Kitt Peak | Spacewatch | · | 830 m | MPC · JPL |
| 296916 | 2010 CW_{92} | — | February 14, 2010 | Kitt Peak | Spacewatch | · | 1.0 km | MPC · JPL |
| 296917 | 2010 CD_{95} | — | February 14, 2010 | Kitt Peak | Spacewatch | · | 1.7 km | MPC · JPL |
| 296918 | 2010 CJ_{95} | — | February 14, 2010 | Kitt Peak | Spacewatch | · | 1.9 km | MPC · JPL |
| 296919 | 2010 CR_{105} | — | February 14, 2010 | Mount Lemmon | Mount Lemmon Survey | · | 3.0 km | MPC · JPL |
| 296920 | 2010 CT_{107} | — | February 14, 2010 | Kitt Peak | Spacewatch | · | 3.9 km | MPC · JPL |
| 296921 | 2010 CU_{107} | — | February 14, 2010 | Kitt Peak | Spacewatch | · | 1.6 km | MPC · JPL |
| 296922 | 2010 CK_{117} | — | February 14, 2010 | Kitt Peak | Spacewatch | · | 5.5 km | MPC · JPL |
| 296923 | 2010 CV_{133} | — | February 15, 2010 | WISE | WISE | · | 4.0 km | MPC · JPL |
| 296924 | 2010 CS_{134} | — | February 15, 2010 | WISE | WISE | ADE | 4.2 km | MPC · JPL |
| 296925 | 2010 CV_{137} | — | February 9, 2010 | Kitt Peak | Spacewatch | MAS | 810 m | MPC · JPL |
| 296926 | 2010 CR_{146} | — | February 13, 2010 | Kitt Peak | Spacewatch | T_{j} (2.98) | 4.4 km | MPC · JPL |
| 296927 | 2010 CY_{146} | — | February 13, 2010 | Kitt Peak | Spacewatch | NYS | 1.3 km | MPC · JPL |
| 296928 Francescopalla | 2010 CE_{155} | Francescopalla | February 17, 1994 | San Marcello | L. Tesi, G. Cattani | · | 3.8 km | MPC · JPL |
| 296929 | 2010 CT_{160} | — | February 9, 2010 | Kitt Peak | Spacewatch | · | 2.5 km | MPC · JPL |
| 296930 McLaren | 2010 CB_{181} | McLaren | February 13, 2010 | Haleakala | Pan-STARRS 1 | · | 900 m | MPC · JPL |
| 296931 | 2010 CF_{232} | — | November 9, 2009 | Catalina | CSS | EOS | 5.6 km | MPC · JPL |
| 296932 | 2010 CR_{235} | — | September 30, 2003 | Socorro | LINEAR | · | 4.8 km | MPC · JPL |
| 296933 | 2010 DH_{6} | — | February 16, 2010 | Kitt Peak | Spacewatch | · | 6.7 km | MPC · JPL |
| 296934 | 2010 DU_{6} | — | February 16, 2010 | Kitt Peak | Spacewatch | · | 2.0 km | MPC · JPL |
| 296935 | 2010 DV_{6} | — | February 16, 2010 | Kitt Peak | Spacewatch | · | 2.2 km | MPC · JPL |
| 296936 | 2010 DV_{11} | — | February 16, 2010 | Mount Lemmon | Mount Lemmon Survey | · | 1.1 km | MPC · JPL |
| 296937 | 2010 DQ_{15} | — | May 19, 2005 | Mount Lemmon | Mount Lemmon Survey | EUP | 5.0 km | MPC · JPL |
| 296938 | 2010 DX_{16} | — | February 16, 2010 | WISE | WISE | · | 3.8 km | MPC · JPL |
| 296939 | 2010 DH_{26} | — | February 20, 2010 | WISE | WISE | · | 3.1 km | MPC · JPL |
| 296940 | 2010 DT_{39} | — | February 16, 2010 | Kitt Peak | Spacewatch | NYS | 1.1 km | MPC · JPL |
| 296941 | 2010 DU_{42} | — | February 17, 2010 | Kitt Peak | Spacewatch | · | 1.2 km | MPC · JPL |
| 296942 | 2010 DU_{44} | — | February 17, 2010 | Kitt Peak | Spacewatch | MIS | 2.3 km | MPC · JPL |
| 296943 | 2010 DN_{45} | — | February 17, 2010 | Kitt Peak | Spacewatch | · | 2.7 km | MPC · JPL |
| 296944 | 2010 DX_{62} | — | February 25, 2010 | WISE | WISE | · | 2.6 km | MPC · JPL |
| 296945 Ronaldlaub | 2010 DD_{78} | Ronaldlaub | February 16, 2010 | Haleakala | Pan-STARRS 1 | · | 1.8 km | MPC · JPL |
| 296946 | 2010 DN_{78} | — | February 16, 2010 | Catalina | CSS | · | 1.6 km | MPC · JPL |
| 296947 | 2010 DS_{78} | — | February 20, 2010 | Vail-Jarnac | Jarnac | · | 3.6 km | MPC · JPL |
| 296948 | 2010 DP_{79} | — | February 18, 2010 | Mount Lemmon | Mount Lemmon Survey | · | 1.4 km | MPC · JPL |
| 296949 | 2010 EH_{14} | — | March 5, 2010 | WISE | WISE | · | 5.5 km | MPC · JPL |
| 296950 Robertbauer | 2010 EJ_{19} | Robertbauer | March 4, 2010 | WISE | WISE | T_{j} (2.97) | 5.1 km | MPC · JPL |
| 296951 | 2010 EL_{21} | — | March 4, 2010 | Kitt Peak | Spacewatch | · | 2.7 km | MPC · JPL |
| 296952 | 2010 EW_{29} | — | March 5, 2010 | Catalina | CSS | ERI | 2.1 km | MPC · JPL |
| 296953 | 2010 EX_{33} | — | March 4, 2010 | Kitt Peak | Spacewatch | · | 3.1 km | MPC · JPL |
| 296954 | 2010 EE_{34} | — | March 5, 2010 | Kitt Peak | Spacewatch | · | 3.1 km | MPC · JPL |
| 296955 | 2010 EJ_{34} | — | March 5, 2010 | Kitt Peak | Spacewatch | · | 1.6 km | MPC · JPL |
| 296956 | 2010 ES_{34} | — | March 9, 2010 | La Sagra | OAM | TIR | 2.5 km | MPC · JPL |
| 296957 | 2010 EJ_{35} | — | March 10, 2010 | La Sagra | OAM | · | 1.6 km | MPC · JPL |
| 296958 | 2010 ER_{37} | — | March 12, 2010 | Mount Lemmon | Mount Lemmon Survey | · | 4.2 km | MPC · JPL |
| 296959 | 2010 ES_{42} | — | March 5, 2010 | Catalina | CSS | · | 900 m | MPC · JPL |
| 296960 | 2010 EY_{43} | — | March 13, 2010 | Dauban | Kugel, F. | · | 3.4 km | MPC · JPL |
| 296961 | 2010 EU_{44} | — | March 13, 2010 | Dauban | Kugel, F. | TIN | 2.4 km | MPC · JPL |
| 296962 | 2010 EF_{66} | — | March 10, 2010 | La Sagra | OAM | ADE | 2.7 km | MPC · JPL |
| 296963 | 2010 EA_{67} | — | March 12, 2010 | Kitt Peak | Spacewatch | V | 1.0 km | MPC · JPL |
| 296964 | 2010 EN_{70} | — | March 12, 2010 | Kitt Peak | Spacewatch | · | 2.4 km | MPC · JPL |
| 296965 | 2010 EF_{74} | — | March 15, 2010 | Kitt Peak | Spacewatch | · | 1.9 km | MPC · JPL |
| 296966 | 2010 EG_{74} | — | March 10, 2010 | Purple Mountain | PMO NEO Survey Program | PHO | 2.8 km | MPC · JPL |
| 296967 | 2010 EK_{74} | — | March 10, 2010 | Moletai | K. Černis, Zdanavicius, J. | · | 3.3 km | MPC · JPL |
| 296968 Ignatianum | 2010 ES_{74} | Ignatianum | March 12, 2010 | Moletai | K. Černis, Zdanavicius, J. | · | 2.0 km | MPC · JPL |
| 296969 | 2010 EU_{75} | — | March 12, 2010 | Kitt Peak | Spacewatch | · | 2.1 km | MPC · JPL |
| 296970 | 2010 EA_{77} | — | March 12, 2010 | Kitt Peak | Spacewatch | · | 990 m | MPC · JPL |
| 296971 | 2010 EN_{77} | — | March 12, 2010 | Catalina | CSS | H | 880 m | MPC · JPL |
| 296972 | 2010 ER_{78} | — | March 12, 2010 | Mount Lemmon | Mount Lemmon Survey | · | 1.8 km | MPC · JPL |
| 296973 | 2010 EU_{82} | — | March 12, 2010 | Catalina | CSS | · | 1.0 km | MPC · JPL |
| 296974 | 2010 EY_{85} | — | March 13, 2010 | Kitt Peak | Spacewatch | ARM | 4.4 km | MPC · JPL |
| 296975 | 2010 EN_{87} | — | March 13, 2010 | Kitt Peak | Spacewatch | · | 2.5 km | MPC · JPL |
| 296976 | 2010 EY_{98} | — | March 14, 2010 | Kitt Peak | Spacewatch | · | 2.2 km | MPC · JPL |
| 296977 | 2010 ED_{99} | — | March 14, 2010 | Kitt Peak | Spacewatch | MAR | 1.1 km | MPC · JPL |
| 296978 | 2010 ER_{99} | — | March 14, 2010 | Kitt Peak | Spacewatch | · | 1.9 km | MPC · JPL |
| 296979 | 2010 EV_{101} | — | February 5, 2000 | Kitt Peak | Spacewatch | · | 3.1 km | MPC · JPL |
| 296980 | 2010 EC_{104} | — | March 15, 2010 | Goodricke-Pigott | R. A. Tucker | · | 2.7 km | MPC · JPL |
| 296981 | 2010 EN_{104} | — | March 12, 2010 | Catalina | CSS | EOS | 3.5 km | MPC · JPL |
| 296982 | 2010 EP_{104} | — | March 12, 2010 | Catalina | CSS | · | 1.9 km | MPC · JPL |
| 296983 | 2010 EQ_{105} | — | March 13, 2010 | Kitt Peak | Spacewatch | · | 1.7 km | MPC · JPL |
| 296984 | 2010 ER_{105} | — | March 14, 2010 | Kitt Peak | Spacewatch | · | 1.7 km | MPC · JPL |
| 296985 | 2010 ED_{109} | — | March 14, 2010 | Kitt Peak | Spacewatch | · | 2.6 km | MPC · JPL |
| 296986 | 2010 EK_{113} | — | April 4, 2002 | Palomar | NEAT | · | 2.2 km | MPC · JPL |
| 296987 Piotrflin | 2010 ET_{119} | Piotrflin | March 11, 2010 | Andrushivka | Andrushivka | · | 6.4 km | MPC · JPL |
| 296988 | 2010 EA_{125} | — | March 12, 2010 | Catalina | CSS | · | 1.3 km | MPC · JPL |
| 296989 | 2010 EE_{125} | — | March 12, 2010 | Mount Lemmon | Mount Lemmon Survey | NYS | 1.7 km | MPC · JPL |
| 296990 | 2010 EM_{125} | — | March 13, 2010 | Kitt Peak | Spacewatch | (1547) | 2.2 km | MPC · JPL |
| 296991 | 2010 EM_{126} | — | March 14, 2010 | Catalina | CSS | · | 3.6 km | MPC · JPL |
| 296992 | 2010 EW_{129} | — | March 13, 2010 | Kitt Peak | Spacewatch | VER | 4.4 km | MPC · JPL |
| 296993 | 2010 ER_{132} | — | March 12, 2010 | Kitt Peak | Spacewatch | · | 1.4 km | MPC · JPL |
| 296994 | 2010 EA_{133} | — | March 13, 2010 | Kitt Peak | Spacewatch | · | 1.7 km | MPC · JPL |
| 296995 | 2010 EG_{137} | — | March 15, 2010 | Mount Lemmon | Mount Lemmon Survey | · | 880 m | MPC · JPL |
| 296996 | 2010 ES_{139} | — | March 13, 2010 | Mount Lemmon | Mount Lemmon Survey | · | 700 m | MPC · JPL |
| 296997 | 2010 FC_{17} | — | March 18, 2010 | Kitt Peak | Spacewatch | · | 3.5 km | MPC · JPL |
| 296998 | 2010 FM_{19} | — | March 18, 2010 | Mount Lemmon | Mount Lemmon Survey | HYG | 3.0 km | MPC · JPL |
| 296999 | 2010 FN_{28} | — | March 16, 2010 | Kitt Peak | Spacewatch | · | 1.7 km | MPC · JPL |
| 297000 | 2010 FV_{28} | — | March 16, 2010 | Mount Lemmon | Mount Lemmon Survey | NYS | 1.5 km | MPC · JPL |

back to top

== See also ==
- Meanings of minor-planet names: 296001–297000
