= Meanings of minor-planet names: 295001–296000 =

As minor planet discoveries are confirmed, they are given a permanent number by the IAU's Minor Planet Center (MPC), and the discoverers can then submit names for them, following the IAU's naming conventions. The list below concerns those minor planets in the specified number-range that have received names, and explains the meanings of those names.

Official naming citations of newly named small Solar System bodies are approved and published in a bulletin by IAU's Working Group for Small Bodies Nomenclature (WGSBN). Before May 2021, citations were published in MPC's Minor Planet Circulars for many decades. Recent citations can also be found on the JPL Small-Body Database (SBDB). Until his death in 2016, German astronomer Lutz D. Schmadel compiled these citations into the Dictionary of Minor Planet Names (DMP) and regularly updated the collection.

Based on Paul Herget's The Names of the Minor Planets, Schmadel also researched the unclear origin of numerous asteroids, most of which had been named prior to World War II. This article incorporates text from this source, which is in the public domain: SBDB New namings may only be added to this list below after official publication as the preannouncement of names is condemned. The WGSBN publishes a comprehensive guideline for the naming rules of non-cometary small Solar System bodies.

== 295001–295100 ==
| Named minor planet | Provisional | This minor planet was named for... | Ref · Catalog |
|---|---|---|---|
There are no named minor planets in this number range

== 295101–295200 ==
back to top

| Named minor planet | Provisional | This minor planet was named for... | Ref · Catalog |
|---|---|---|---|
There are no named minor planets in this number range

== 295201–295300 ==
back to top

| Named minor planet | Provisional | This minor planet was named for... | Ref · Catalog |
|---|---|---|---|
| 295299 Nannidiana | 2008 GZ_{111} | Giovanni Foglia (born 1932) and Diana Damiani (born 1938), the parents of Italian amateur astronomer Sergio Foglia, who is a discoverer of minor planets | JPL · 295299 |

== 295301–295400 ==
back to top

| Named minor planet | Provisional | This minor planet was named for... | Ref · Catalog |
|---|---|---|---|
There are no named minor planets in this number range

== 295401–295500 ==
back to top

| Named minor planet | Provisional | This minor planet was named for... | Ref · Catalog |
|---|---|---|---|
| 295471 Herbertnitsch | 2008 QM_{11} | Herbert Nitsch (born 1970) is an Austrian freediver who holds a men's world records in no-limits apnea at 214 m. | JPL · 295471 |
| 295472 Puy | 2008 QJ_{14} | Denis Puy (born 1962), a professor at the University of Montpellier and head of the Laboratory Universe and Particles of Montpellier. | JPL · 295472 |
| 295473 Cochard | 2008 QD_{16} | François Cochard (born 1965), a French engineer, who has promoted spectroscopy by amateur astronomers. | JPL · 295473 |
| 295492 Adrianprakhov | 2008 RT_{22} | Adrian Viktorovych Prakhov (1846–1916), Russian art critic and archaeologist. | JPL · 295492 |

== 295501–295600 ==
back to top

| Named minor planet | Provisional | This minor planet was named for... | Ref · Catalog |
|---|---|---|---|
| 295565 Hannover | 2008 SL_{83} | Hannover, the capital city of Niedersachsen, Germany. | JPL · 295565 |

== 295601–295700 ==
back to top

| Named minor planet | Provisional | This minor planet was named for... | Ref · Catalog |
|---|---|---|---|
There are no named minor planets in this number range

== 295701–295800 ==
back to top

| Named minor planet | Provisional | This minor planet was named for... | Ref · Catalog |
|---|---|---|---|
There are no named minor planets in this number range

== 295801–295900 ==
back to top

| Named minor planet | Provisional | This minor planet was named for... | Ref · Catalog |
|---|---|---|---|
| 295841 Gorbulin | 2008 VT_{13} | Volodymyr Pavlovych Gorbulin (born 1939) is a member of National Academy of Sciences of Ukraine and the International Academy of Astronautics. He was the first General Director of the National Space Agency of Ukraine (1992–1994). | JPL · 295841 |

== 295901–296000 ==
back to top

| Named minor planet | Provisional | This minor planet was named for... | Ref · Catalog |
|---|---|---|---|
| 295935 Majia | 2008 XD_{7} | Majia, a hill located within Shandong University, Weihai, China. | IAU · 295935 |

back to top

| Preceded by 294,001–295,000 | Meanings of minor-planet names List of minor planets: 295,001–296,000 | Succeeded by 296,001–297,000 |
