= List of minor planets: 295001–296000 =

The following is a partial list of minor planets, running from minor-planet number 295001 through 296000, inclusive. The primary data for this and other partial lists is based on JPL's "Small-Body Orbital Elements" and data available from the Minor Planet Center. Critical list information is also provided by the MPC, unless otherwise specified from Lowell Observatory. A detailed description of the table's columns and additional sources are given on the main page including a complete list of every page in this series, and a statistical break-up on the dynamical classification of minor planets.

Also see the summary list of all named bodies in numerical and alphabetical order, and the corresponding naming citations for the number range of this particular list. New namings may only be added to this list after official publication, as the preannouncement of names is condemned by the Working Group for Small Bodies Nomenclature of the International Astronomical Union.

Near-Earth obj.	MBA (inner)	MBA (outer)	Centaur
Mars-crosser	MBA (middle)	Jupiter trojan	Trans-Neptunian obj.
Unclassified

== 295001–295100 ==
Designation			Discovery			Properties		Ref
Permanent	Provisional	Named after	Date	Site	Discoverer(s)	Category	Diam.	Ref
295001	2008 EM_{39}	—	March 4, 2008	Catalina	CSS	·	1.1 km	MPC · JPL
295002	2008 EZ_{40}	—	March 4, 2008	Catalina	CSS	·	2.4 km	MPC · JPL
295003	2008 EA_{42}	—	March 4, 2008	Kitt Peak	Spacewatch	JUN	1.7 km	MPC · JPL
295004	2008 EE_{42}	—	March 4, 2008	Kitt Peak	Spacewatch	·	2.9 km	MPC · JPL
295005	2008 ET_{42}	—	March 4, 2008	Mount Lemmon	Mount Lemmon Survey	·	4.0 km	MPC · JPL
295006	2008 EX_{42}	—	March 4, 2008	Mount Lemmon	Mount Lemmon Survey	EUN	1.4 km	MPC · JPL
295007	2008 EY_{42}	—	March 4, 2008	Mount Lemmon	Mount Lemmon Survey	HOF	2.7 km	MPC · JPL
295008	2008 EB_{44}	—	March 5, 2008	Mount Lemmon	Mount Lemmon Survey	AGN	1.4 km	MPC · JPL
295009	2008 EX_{48}	—	March 6, 2008	Kitt Peak	Spacewatch	·	660 m	MPC · JPL
295010	2008 EP_{49}	—	March 6, 2008	Kitt Peak	Spacewatch	NYS	1.3 km	MPC · JPL
295011	2008 EW_{49}	—	March 6, 2008	Kitt Peak	Spacewatch	·	3.0 km	MPC · JPL
295012	2008 EE_{51}	—	March 6, 2008	Kitt Peak	Spacewatch	·	720 m	MPC · JPL
295013	2008 EZ_{51}	—	March 6, 2008	Mount Lemmon	Mount Lemmon Survey	·	850 m	MPC · JPL
295014	2008 ES_{52}	—	March 6, 2008	Kitt Peak	Spacewatch	·	2.4 km	MPC · JPL
295015	2008 EP_{54}	—	March 6, 2008	Kitt Peak	Spacewatch	·	1.5 km	MPC · JPL
295016	2008 EV_{54}	—	March 6, 2008	Kitt Peak	Spacewatch	·	1.9 km	MPC · JPL
295017	2008 ES_{57}	—	March 7, 2008	Mount Lemmon	Mount Lemmon Survey	615	1.6 km	MPC · JPL
295018	2008 ED_{58}	—	March 7, 2008	Mount Lemmon	Mount Lemmon Survey	·	2.1 km	MPC · JPL
295019	2008 ES_{59}	—	March 8, 2008	Kitt Peak	Spacewatch	·	1.7 km	MPC · JPL
295020	2008 EF_{60}	—	March 8, 2008	Catalina	CSS	(1338) (FLO)	840 m	MPC · JPL
295021	2008 EH_{68}	—	March 10, 2008	Mount Lemmon	Mount Lemmon Survey	L5	14 km	MPC · JPL
295022	2008 EG_{70}	—	March 5, 2008	Mount Lemmon	Mount Lemmon Survey	·	1.0 km	MPC · JPL
295023	2008 EC_{73}	—	March 7, 2008	Kitt Peak	Spacewatch	·	3.2 km	MPC · JPL
295024	2008 ET_{73}	—	March 7, 2008	Kitt Peak	Spacewatch	L5	10 km	MPC · JPL
295025	2008 EH_{74}	—	March 7, 2008	Kitt Peak	Spacewatch	·	2.0 km	MPC · JPL
295026	2008 EA_{75}	—	March 7, 2008	Kitt Peak	Spacewatch	KOR	1.9 km	MPC · JPL
295027	2008 EV_{75}	—	March 7, 2008	Kitt Peak	Spacewatch	MRX	1.1 km	MPC · JPL
295028	2008 ED_{77}	—	March 7, 2008	Kitt Peak	Spacewatch	·	3.0 km	MPC · JPL
295029	2008 EE_{77}	—	March 7, 2008	Kitt Peak	Spacewatch	·	2.9 km	MPC · JPL
295030	2008 EB_{79}	—	March 8, 2008	Mount Lemmon	Mount Lemmon Survey	·	2.0 km	MPC · JPL
295031	2008 EC_{81}	—	March 10, 2008	Kitt Peak	Spacewatch	·	1.5 km	MPC · JPL
295032	2008 EL_{81}	—	March 10, 2008	Catalina	CSS	·	4.1 km	MPC · JPL
295033	2008 EU_{81}	—	March 2, 2008	Socorro	LINEAR	CYB	6.6 km	MPC · JPL
295034	2008 EX_{82}	—	March 8, 2008	Socorro	LINEAR	·	950 m	MPC · JPL
295035	2008 EU_{83}	—	March 12, 2008	Wrightwood	J. W. Young	·	980 m	MPC · JPL
295036	2008 EJ_{86}	—	March 7, 2008	Kitt Peak	Spacewatch	AGN	1.6 km	MPC · JPL
295037	2008 ER_{89}	—	March 10, 2008	Socorro	LINEAR	·	1.4 km	MPC · JPL
295038	2008 EC_{92}	—	March 3, 2008	Catalina	CSS	NYS	1.4 km	MPC · JPL
295039	2008 EP_{93}	—	March 1, 2008	Mount Lemmon	Mount Lemmon Survey	·	1.9 km	MPC · JPL
295040	2008 EV_{95}	—	March 6, 2008	Mount Lemmon	Mount Lemmon Survey	·	1.6 km	MPC · JPL
295041	2008 ER_{98}	—	March 3, 2008	Catalina	CSS	·	1.2 km	MPC · JPL
295042	2008 EU_{98}	—	March 3, 2008	Catalina	CSS	·	1.6 km	MPC · JPL
295043	2008 EW_{98}	—	March 4, 2008	Catalina	CSS	·	1.7 km	MPC · JPL
295044	2008 EV_{99}	—	March 6, 2008	Catalina	CSS	·	5.6 km	MPC · JPL
295045	2008 EB_{100}	—	March 6, 2008	Catalina	CSS	PHO	1.1 km	MPC · JPL
295046	2008 EZ_{101}	—	March 5, 2008	Mount Lemmon	Mount Lemmon Survey	·	890 m	MPC · JPL
295047	2008 EE_{105}	—	March 6, 2008	Mount Lemmon	Mount Lemmon Survey	·	1.1 km	MPC · JPL
295048	2008 EY_{107}	—	March 7, 2008	Mount Lemmon	Mount Lemmon Survey	MAS	800 m	MPC · JPL
295049	2008 EZ_{107}	—	March 7, 2008	Mount Lemmon	Mount Lemmon Survey	(2076)	810 m	MPC · JPL
295050	2008 EU_{109}	—	March 7, 2008	Mount Lemmon	Mount Lemmon Survey	·	610 m	MPC · JPL
295051	2008 EY_{110}	—	March 8, 2008	Kitt Peak	Spacewatch	·	3.0 km	MPC · JPL
295052	2008 EN_{112}	—	March 8, 2008	Kitt Peak	Spacewatch	·	3.3 km	MPC · JPL
295053	2008 EH_{114}	—	March 8, 2008	Kitt Peak	Spacewatch	·	3.7 km	MPC · JPL
295054	2008 EU_{114}	—	March 8, 2008	Kitt Peak	Spacewatch	EOS	2.5 km	MPC · JPL
295055	2008 EM_{115}	—	March 8, 2008	Kitt Peak	Spacewatch	WIT	1.3 km	MPC · JPL
295056	2008 ED_{116}	—	March 8, 2008	Mount Lemmon	Mount Lemmon Survey	·	2.4 km	MPC · JPL
295057	2008 EM_{116}	—	March 8, 2008	Kitt Peak	Spacewatch	·	1.4 km	MPC · JPL
295058	2008 EU_{116}	—	March 8, 2008	Kitt Peak	Spacewatch	·	1.4 km	MPC · JPL
295059	2008 EX_{117}	—	March 9, 2008	Mount Lemmon	Mount Lemmon Survey	KOR	1.2 km	MPC · JPL
295060	2008 EL_{118}	—	March 9, 2008	Kitt Peak	Spacewatch	THB	3.8 km	MPC · JPL
295061	2008 EP_{119}	—	March 9, 2008	Kitt Peak	Spacewatch	·	1.4 km	MPC · JPL
295062	2008 EW_{119}	—	March 9, 2008	Kitt Peak	Spacewatch	·	1.6 km	MPC · JPL
295063	2008 EJ_{120}	—	March 9, 2008	Kitt Peak	Spacewatch	NYS	1.1 km	MPC · JPL
295064	2008 EP_{120}	—	March 9, 2008	Kitt Peak	Spacewatch	NYS	2.2 km	MPC · JPL
295065	2008 ET_{120}	—	March 9, 2008	Kitt Peak	Spacewatch	·	1.8 km	MPC · JPL
295066	2008 EH_{121}	—	March 9, 2008	Kitt Peak	Spacewatch	VER	3.6 km	MPC · JPL
295067	2008 EY_{122}	—	March 9, 2008	Kitt Peak	Spacewatch	·	1.8 km	MPC · JPL
295068	2008 EH_{123}	—	March 9, 2008	Kitt Peak	Spacewatch	·	1.3 km	MPC · JPL
295069	2008 EE_{125}	—	March 10, 2008	Catalina	CSS	·	920 m	MPC · JPL
295070	2008 EG_{125}	—	March 10, 2008	Catalina	CSS	·	2.1 km	MPC · JPL
295071	2008 EH_{126}	—	March 10, 2008	Kitt Peak	Spacewatch	KOR	1.4 km	MPC · JPL
295072	2008 ER_{126}	—	March 10, 2008	Mount Lemmon	Mount Lemmon Survey	·	2.0 km	MPC · JPL
295073	2008 EW_{127}	—	March 11, 2008	Kitt Peak	Spacewatch	·	1.7 km	MPC · JPL
295074	2008 ED_{130}	—	March 11, 2008	Kitt Peak	Spacewatch	NYS	1.3 km	MPC · JPL
295075	2008 EK_{130}	—	March 11, 2008	Kitt Peak	Spacewatch	·	1.7 km	MPC · JPL
295076	2008 ER_{131}	—	March 11, 2008	Kitt Peak	Spacewatch	DOR	3.4 km	MPC · JPL
295077	2008 EG_{133}	—	March 11, 2008	Mount Lemmon	Mount Lemmon Survey	EOS	2.9 km	MPC · JPL
295078	2008 EW_{133}	—	March 11, 2008	Mount Lemmon	Mount Lemmon Survey	·	900 m	MPC · JPL
295079	2008 ED_{135}	—	March 11, 2008	Kitt Peak	Spacewatch	KOR	1.5 km	MPC · JPL
295080	2008 EH_{135}	—	March 11, 2008	Kitt Peak	Spacewatch	·	1.7 km	MPC · JPL
295081	2008 EL_{135}	—	March 11, 2008	Kitt Peak	Spacewatch	·	1.1 km	MPC · JPL
295082	2008 EO_{136}	—	March 11, 2008	Kitt Peak	Spacewatch	NYS	1.0 km	MPC · JPL
295083	2008 EX_{136}	—	March 11, 2008	Kitt Peak	Spacewatch	·	1.0 km	MPC · JPL
295084	2008 EY_{139}	—	March 11, 2008	Kitt Peak	Spacewatch	·	1.8 km	MPC · JPL
295085	2008 EZ_{140}	—	March 12, 2008	Kitt Peak	Spacewatch	·	2.3 km	MPC · JPL
295086	2008 EF_{142}	—	March 12, 2008	Kitt Peak	Spacewatch	V	820 m	MPC · JPL
295087	2008 EF_{144}	—	March 11, 2008	Kitt Peak	Spacewatch	·	3.1 km	MPC · JPL
295088	2008 EO_{147}	—	March 1, 2008	Kitt Peak	Spacewatch	·	2.5 km	MPC · JPL
295089	2008 EB_{148}	—	March 1, 2008	Kitt Peak	Spacewatch	EUP	3.9 km	MPC · JPL
295090	2008 EK_{149}	—	March 4, 2008	Kitt Peak	Spacewatch	HOF	3.4 km	MPC · JPL
295091	2008 EA_{150}	—	March 6, 2008	Kitt Peak	Spacewatch	·	1.8 km	MPC · JPL
295092	2008 EG_{150}	—	March 9, 2008	Kitt Peak	Spacewatch	·	3.0 km	MPC · JPL
295093	2008 EN_{151}	—	March 8, 2008	Mount Lemmon	Mount Lemmon Survey	·	1.3 km	MPC · JPL
295094	2008 EU_{157}	—	March 2, 2008	Kitt Peak	Spacewatch	NYS	950 m	MPC · JPL
295095	2008 EN_{158}	—	March 10, 2008	Mount Lemmon	Mount Lemmon Survey	·	3.2 km	MPC · JPL
295096	2008 EP_{158}	—	March 10, 2008	Mount Lemmon	Mount Lemmon Survey	(16286)	2.4 km	MPC · JPL
295097	2008 EY_{159}	—	March 3, 2008	Purple Mountain	PMO NEO Survey Program	·	4.0 km	MPC · JPL
295098	2008 EA_{160}	—	March 10, 2008	Kitt Peak	Spacewatch	·	2.0 km	MPC · JPL
295099	2008 EP_{160}	—	March 1, 2008	Kitt Peak	Spacewatch	3:2	5.3 km	MPC · JPL
295100	2008 EH_{161}	—	March 8, 2008	Kitt Peak	Spacewatch	·	2.0 km	MPC · JPL

== 295101–295200 ==
back to top

Designation			Discovery			Properties		Ref
Permanent	Provisional	Named after	Date	Site	Discoverer(s)	Category	Diam.	Ref
295101	2008 EL_{161}	—	March 8, 2008	Mount Lemmon	Mount Lemmon Survey	·	2.4 km	MPC · JPL
295102	2008 EZ_{161}	—	March 11, 2008	Kitt Peak	Spacewatch	·	4.9 km	MPC · JPL
295103	2008 EL_{162}	—	March 13, 2008	Kitt Peak	Spacewatch	AST	1.7 km	MPC · JPL
295104	2008 EM_{165}	—	March 2, 2008	Kitt Peak	Spacewatch	·	1.9 km	MPC · JPL
295105	2008 EU_{165}	—	March 4, 2008	Catalina	CSS	PAD	3.2 km	MPC · JPL
295106	2008 EV_{165}	—	March 4, 2008	Catalina	CSS	·	2.9 km	MPC · JPL
295107	2008 ES_{166}	—	March 6, 2008	Mount Lemmon	Mount Lemmon Survey	·	1.9 km	MPC · JPL
295108	2008 EP_{167}	—	March 8, 2008	Mount Lemmon	Mount Lemmon Survey	MAS	790 m	MPC · JPL
295109	2008 FO_{2}	—	March 25, 2008	Kitt Peak	Spacewatch	VER	3.9 km	MPC · JPL
295110	2008 FQ_{3}	—	March 25, 2008	Kitt Peak	Spacewatch	·	2.3 km	MPC · JPL
295111	2008 FY_{4}	—	March 26, 2008	Mount Lemmon	Mount Lemmon Survey	EOS	2.0 km	MPC · JPL
295112	2008 FA_{5}	—	March 26, 2008	Mount Lemmon	Mount Lemmon Survey	·	1.6 km	MPC · JPL
295113	2008 FL_{5}	—	March 26, 2008	Mayhill	Dillon, W. G.	MAS	940 m	MPC · JPL
295114	2008 FD_{6}	—	March 28, 2008	Vail-Jarnac	Jarnac	·	6.7 km	MPC · JPL
295115	2008 FS_{7}	—	March 25, 2008	Kitt Peak	Spacewatch	THB	4.0 km	MPC · JPL
295116	2008 FR_{8}	—	March 26, 2008	Kitt Peak	Spacewatch	·	580 m	MPC · JPL
295117	2008 FE_{9}	—	March 26, 2008	Kitt Peak	Spacewatch	·	2.6 km	MPC · JPL
295118	2008 FL_{11}	—	March 26, 2008	Mount Lemmon	Mount Lemmon Survey	EOS ·	3.8 km	MPC · JPL
295119	2008 FH_{15}	—	March 26, 2008	Kitt Peak	Spacewatch	·	1.5 km	MPC · JPL
295120	2008 FT_{15}	—	March 26, 2008	Kitt Peak	Spacewatch	·	2.7 km	MPC · JPL
295121	2008 FO_{16}	—	March 27, 2008	Kitt Peak	Spacewatch	AGN	1.5 km	MPC · JPL
295122	2008 FS_{16}	—	March 27, 2008	Kitt Peak	Spacewatch	·	1.2 km	MPC · JPL
295123	2008 FE_{22}	—	March 27, 2008	Kitt Peak	Spacewatch	WIT	1.2 km	MPC · JPL
295124	2008 FS_{23}	—	March 27, 2008	Kitt Peak	Spacewatch	NEM	3.2 km	MPC · JPL
295125	2008 FF_{24}	—	March 27, 2008	Kitt Peak	Spacewatch	EOS	2.1 km	MPC · JPL
295126	2008 FG_{25}	—	March 27, 2008	Mount Lemmon	Mount Lemmon Survey	·	4.3 km	MPC · JPL
295127	2008 FT_{25}	—	March 27, 2008	Kitt Peak	Spacewatch	·	930 m	MPC · JPL
295128	2008 FU_{26}	—	March 27, 2008	Kitt Peak	Spacewatch	NYS	1.2 km	MPC · JPL
295129	2008 FK_{27}	—	March 27, 2008	Kitt Peak	Spacewatch	·	1.7 km	MPC · JPL
295130	2008 FF_{28}	—	March 27, 2008	Lulin	LUSS	·	770 m	MPC · JPL
295131	2008 FJ_{28}	—	March 27, 2008	Lulin	LUSS	DOR	3.2 km	MPC · JPL
295132	2008 FO_{28}	—	March 28, 2008	Kitt Peak	Spacewatch	·	1.2 km	MPC · JPL
295133	2008 FL_{29}	—	March 28, 2008	Kitt Peak	Spacewatch	·	2.0 km	MPC · JPL
295134	2008 FW_{29}	—	March 28, 2008	Kitt Peak	Spacewatch	·	2.0 km	MPC · JPL
295135	2008 FN_{30}	—	March 28, 2008	Kitt Peak	Spacewatch	NYS	1.4 km	MPC · JPL
295136	2008 FV_{31}	—	March 28, 2008	Mount Lemmon	Mount Lemmon Survey	·	2.8 km	MPC · JPL
295137	2008 FK_{32}	—	March 28, 2008	Mount Lemmon	Mount Lemmon Survey	·	790 m	MPC · JPL
295138	2008 FT_{32}	—	March 28, 2008	Mount Lemmon	Mount Lemmon Survey	·	1.0 km	MPC · JPL
295139	2008 FO_{37}	—	March 28, 2008	Kitt Peak	Spacewatch	·	1.7 km	MPC · JPL
295140	2008 FT_{39}	—	March 28, 2008	Kitt Peak	Spacewatch	L5	9.3 km	MPC · JPL
295141	2008 FX_{39}	—	March 28, 2008	Kitt Peak	Spacewatch	·	2.0 km	MPC · JPL
295142	2008 FE_{40}	—	March 28, 2008	Kitt Peak	Spacewatch	·	880 m	MPC · JPL
295143	2008 FP_{40}	—	March 28, 2008	Kitt Peak	Spacewatch	·	1.2 km	MPC · JPL
295144	2008 FD_{41}	—	March 28, 2008	Kitt Peak	Spacewatch	·	760 m	MPC · JPL
295145	2008 FM_{44}	—	March 28, 2008	Kitt Peak	Spacewatch	·	3.0 km	MPC · JPL
295146	2008 FG_{45}	—	March 28, 2008	Mount Lemmon	Mount Lemmon Survey	·	1.5 km	MPC · JPL
295147	2008 FA_{49}	—	March 28, 2008	Mount Lemmon	Mount Lemmon Survey	NYS	1.3 km	MPC · JPL
295148	2008 FO_{51}	—	March 28, 2008	Mount Lemmon	Mount Lemmon Survey	·	1.6 km	MPC · JPL
295149	2008 FY_{52}	—	March 28, 2008	Mount Lemmon	Mount Lemmon Survey	·	2.0 km	MPC · JPL
295150	2008 FJ_{53}	—	March 28, 2008	Mount Lemmon	Mount Lemmon Survey	KOR	1.5 km	MPC · JPL
295151	2008 FA_{54}	—	March 28, 2008	Mount Lemmon	Mount Lemmon Survey	(3460)	3.5 km	MPC · JPL
295152	2008 FU_{54}	—	March 28, 2008	Mount Lemmon	Mount Lemmon Survey	EOS	2.8 km	MPC · JPL
295153	2008 FX_{57}	—	March 28, 2008	Mount Lemmon	Mount Lemmon Survey	L5	13 km	MPC · JPL
295154	2008 FF_{59}	—	March 29, 2008	Mount Lemmon	Mount Lemmon Survey	·	790 m	MPC · JPL
295155	2008 FH_{60}	—	March 29, 2008	Catalina	CSS	V	920 m	MPC · JPL
295156	2008 FZ_{61}	—	March 25, 2008	Kitt Peak	Spacewatch	·	3.6 km	MPC · JPL
295157	2008 FK_{62}	—	March 27, 2008	Kitt Peak	Spacewatch	·	1.4 km	MPC · JPL
295158	2008 FF_{63}	—	March 27, 2008	Kitt Peak	Spacewatch	·	950 m	MPC · JPL
295159	2008 FN_{63}	—	March 27, 2008	Kitt Peak	Spacewatch	·	3.6 km	MPC · JPL
295160	2008 FC_{65}	—	March 28, 2008	Kitt Peak	Spacewatch	·	1.2 km	MPC · JPL
295161	2008 FH_{65}	—	March 28, 2008	Kitt Peak	Spacewatch	·	2.2 km	MPC · JPL
295162	2008 FK_{65}	—	March 28, 2008	Kitt Peak	Spacewatch	·	1.1 km	MPC · JPL
295163	2008 FR_{65}	—	March 28, 2008	Mount Lemmon	Mount Lemmon Survey	KON	3.1 km	MPC · JPL
295164	2008 FM_{67}	—	March 28, 2008	Mount Lemmon	Mount Lemmon Survey	·	1.3 km	MPC · JPL
295165	2008 FP_{67}	—	March 28, 2008	Mount Lemmon	Mount Lemmon Survey	·	2.7 km	MPC · JPL
295166	2008 FS_{67}	—	March 28, 2008	Mount Lemmon	Mount Lemmon Survey	·	1.3 km	MPC · JPL
295167	2008 FX_{68}	—	March 28, 2008	Mount Lemmon	Mount Lemmon Survey	·	750 m	MPC · JPL
295168	2008 FG_{71}	—	March 29, 2008	Catalina	CSS	·	4.2 km	MPC · JPL
295169	2008 FR_{71}	—	March 30, 2008	Kitt Peak	Spacewatch	VER	3.5 km	MPC · JPL
295170	2008 FO_{72}	—	March 30, 2008	Kitt Peak	Spacewatch	L5	10 km	MPC · JPL
295171	2008 FQ_{80}	—	March 27, 2008	Mount Lemmon	Mount Lemmon Survey	KOR	1.2 km	MPC · JPL
295172	2008 FW_{81}	—	March 27, 2008	Mount Lemmon	Mount Lemmon Survey	·	1.2 km	MPC · JPL
295173	2008 FA_{83}	—	March 28, 2008	Kitt Peak	Spacewatch	AGN	1.4 km	MPC · JPL
295174	2008 FU_{83}	—	March 28, 2008	Kitt Peak	Spacewatch	·	1.3 km	MPC · JPL
295175	2008 FL_{86}	—	March 28, 2008	Mount Lemmon	Mount Lemmon Survey	·	1.6 km	MPC · JPL
295176	2008 FO_{88}	—	March 28, 2008	Mount Lemmon	Mount Lemmon Survey	·	1.7 km	MPC · JPL
295177	2008 FE_{89}	—	March 29, 2008	Mount Lemmon	Mount Lemmon Survey	·	4.1 km	MPC · JPL
295178	2008 FA_{90}	—	March 29, 2008	Mount Lemmon	Mount Lemmon Survey	·	710 m	MPC · JPL
295179	2008 FH_{90}	—	March 29, 2008	Mount Lemmon	Mount Lemmon Survey	·	2.8 km	MPC · JPL
295180	2008 FL_{90}	—	March 29, 2008	Mount Lemmon	Mount Lemmon Survey	DOR	3.7 km	MPC · JPL
295181	2008 FJ_{91}	—	March 29, 2008	Catalina	CSS	·	1.0 km	MPC · JPL
295182	2008 FO_{93}	—	March 29, 2008	Kitt Peak	Spacewatch	·	2.8 km	MPC · JPL
295183	2008 FK_{94}	—	March 29, 2008	Kitt Peak	Spacewatch	HYG	3.9 km	MPC · JPL
295184	2008 FD_{95}	—	March 29, 2008	Kitt Peak	Spacewatch	·	3.1 km	MPC · JPL
295185	2008 FR_{95}	—	March 29, 2008	Mount Lemmon	Mount Lemmon Survey	·	2.1 km	MPC · JPL
295186	2008 FT_{96}	—	March 29, 2008	Catalina	CSS	PHO	1.3 km	MPC · JPL
295187	2008 FC_{98}	—	March 30, 2008	Kitt Peak	Spacewatch	·	2.4 km	MPC · JPL
295188	2008 FE_{98}	—	March 30, 2008	Kitt Peak	Spacewatch	·	1.2 km	MPC · JPL
295189	2008 FG_{100}	—	March 30, 2008	Kitt Peak	Spacewatch	V	700 m	MPC · JPL
295190	2008 FR_{100}	—	March 30, 2008	Kitt Peak	Spacewatch	·	3.0 km	MPC · JPL
295191	2008 FQ_{101}	—	March 30, 2008	Kitt Peak	Spacewatch	·	2.7 km	MPC · JPL
295192	2008 FX_{101}	—	March 30, 2008	Kitt Peak	Spacewatch	HYG	3.6 km	MPC · JPL
295193	2008 FE_{102}	—	March 30, 2008	Kitt Peak	Spacewatch	·	2.4 km	MPC · JPL
295194	2008 FO_{102}	—	March 30, 2008	Kitt Peak	Spacewatch	·	2.0 km	MPC · JPL
295195	2008 FN_{107}	—	March 31, 2008	Kitt Peak	Spacewatch	·	770 m	MPC · JPL
295196	2008 FQ_{107}	—	March 31, 2008	Kitt Peak	Spacewatch	fast	4.6 km	MPC · JPL
295197	2008 FF_{109}	—	March 31, 2008	Mount Lemmon	Mount Lemmon Survey	·	2.3 km	MPC · JPL
295198	2008 FZ_{110}	—	March 31, 2008	Kitt Peak	Spacewatch	·	1.1 km	MPC · JPL
295199	2008 FG_{111}	—	March 31, 2008	Kitt Peak	Spacewatch	L5	10 km	MPC · JPL
295200	2008 FD_{114}	—	March 31, 2008	Kitt Peak	Spacewatch	·	860 m	MPC · JPL

== 295201–295300 ==
back to top

Designation			Discovery			Properties		Ref
Permanent	Provisional	Named after	Date	Site	Discoverer(s)	Category	Diam.	Ref
295201	2008 FY_{114}	—	March 31, 2008	Mount Lemmon	Mount Lemmon Survey	·	2.0 km	MPC · JPL
295202	2008 FR_{116}	—	March 31, 2008	Kitt Peak	Spacewatch	·	1.7 km	MPC · JPL
295203	2008 FB_{117}	—	March 31, 2008	Kitt Peak	Spacewatch	(5)	1.7 km	MPC · JPL
295204	2008 FV_{117}	—	March 31, 2008	Kitt Peak	Spacewatch	AEO	1.3 km	MPC · JPL
295205	2008 FW_{122}	—	March 28, 2008	Kitt Peak	Spacewatch	L5	9.3 km	MPC · JPL
295206	2008 FH_{123}	—	March 28, 2008	Kitt Peak	Spacewatch	HYG	2.6 km	MPC · JPL
295207	2008 FV_{123}	—	March 29, 2008	Kitt Peak	Spacewatch	L5	10 km	MPC · JPL
295208	2008 FD_{124}	—	March 29, 2008	Kitt Peak	Spacewatch	·	2.0 km	MPC · JPL
295209	2008 FE_{124}	—	March 29, 2008	Kitt Peak	Spacewatch	VER	3.0 km	MPC · JPL
295210	2008 FJ_{124}	—	March 29, 2008	Mount Lemmon	Mount Lemmon Survey	·	3.1 km	MPC · JPL
295211	2008 FT_{124}	—	March 30, 2008	Kitt Peak	Spacewatch	·	1.4 km	MPC · JPL
295212	2008 FH_{128}	—	March 28, 2008	Mount Lemmon	Mount Lemmon Survey	·	780 m	MPC · JPL
295213	2008 FF_{129}	—	March 29, 2008	Kitt Peak	Spacewatch	MRX	1.1 km	MPC · JPL
295214	2008 FY_{130}	—	March 27, 2008	Kitt Peak	Spacewatch	TEL	1.9 km	MPC · JPL
295215	2008 FJ_{132}	—	March 27, 2008	Mount Lemmon	Mount Lemmon Survey	·	1.8 km	MPC · JPL
295216	2008 FO_{132}	—	March 28, 2008	Kitt Peak	Spacewatch	HYG	3.3 km	MPC · JPL
295217	2008 FZ_{132}	—	March 30, 2008	Kitt Peak	Spacewatch	L5	10 km	MPC · JPL
295218	2008 FH_{133}	—	March 31, 2008	Mount Lemmon	Mount Lemmon Survey	PAD	1.6 km	MPC · JPL
295219	2008 FD_{136}	—	March 26, 2008	Mount Lemmon	Mount Lemmon Survey	MAS	880 m	MPC · JPL
295220	2008 FD_{137}	—	March 30, 2008	Kitt Peak	Spacewatch	·	1.1 km	MPC · JPL
295221	2008 GM	—	April 2, 2008	La Sagra	OAM	·	750 m	MPC · JPL
295222	2008 GH_{1}	—	April 2, 2008	La Sagra	OAM	·	1.9 km	MPC · JPL
295223	2008 GM_{4}	—	April 1, 2008	Kitt Peak	Spacewatch	·	1.1 km	MPC · JPL
295224	2008 GL_{6}	—	April 1, 2008	Kitt Peak	Spacewatch	·	2.0 km	MPC · JPL
295225	2008 GN_{6}	—	April 1, 2008	Kitt Peak	Spacewatch	·	2.0 km	MPC · JPL
295226	2008 GC_{7}	—	April 1, 2008	Kitt Peak	Spacewatch	L5	13 km	MPC · JPL
295227	2008 GG_{7}	—	April 1, 2008	Kitt Peak	Spacewatch	·	3.1 km	MPC · JPL
295228	2008 GP_{7}	—	April 1, 2008	Kitt Peak	Spacewatch	·	870 m	MPC · JPL
295229	2008 GW_{9}	—	April 1, 2008	Kitt Peak	Spacewatch	MAS	700 m	MPC · JPL
295230	2008 GJ_{11}	—	April 1, 2008	Kitt Peak	Spacewatch	MIS	2.7 km	MPC · JPL
295231	2008 GY_{12}	—	April 3, 2008	Kitt Peak	Spacewatch	·	4.6 km	MPC · JPL
295232	2008 GF_{13}	—	April 3, 2008	Kitt Peak	Spacewatch	·	1.9 km	MPC · JPL
295233	2008 GW_{13}	—	April 3, 2008	Mount Lemmon	Mount Lemmon Survey	·	3.0 km	MPC · JPL
295234	2008 GW_{18}	—	April 4, 2008	Mount Lemmon	Mount Lemmon Survey	·	4.0 km	MPC · JPL
295235	2008 GC_{19}	—	April 4, 2008	Mount Lemmon	Mount Lemmon Survey	H	600 m	MPC · JPL
295236	2008 GK_{19}	—	April 4, 2008	Mount Lemmon	Mount Lemmon Survey	·	810 m	MPC · JPL
295237	2008 GY_{19}	—	April 4, 2008	Kitt Peak	Spacewatch	·	660 m	MPC · JPL
295238	2008 GR_{20}	—	April 3, 2008	Socorro	LINEAR	·	1.5 km	MPC · JPL
295239	2008 GJ_{21}	—	April 11, 2008	Desert Eagle	W. K. Y. Yeung	MAS	790 m	MPC · JPL
295240	2008 GO_{24}	—	April 1, 2008	Mount Lemmon	Mount Lemmon Survey	·	3.7 km	MPC · JPL
295241	2008 GY_{24}	—	April 1, 2008	Mount Lemmon	Mount Lemmon Survey	·	4.5 km	MPC · JPL
295242	2008 GL_{25}	—	April 1, 2008	Mount Lemmon	Mount Lemmon Survey	·	3.4 km	MPC · JPL
295243	2008 GS_{26}	—	April 1, 2008	Catalina	CSS	PHO	3.2 km	MPC · JPL
295244	2008 GN_{27}	—	April 3, 2008	Kitt Peak	Spacewatch	·	1.7 km	MPC · JPL
295245	2008 GF_{28}	—	April 3, 2008	Kitt Peak	Spacewatch	·	1.6 km	MPC · JPL
295246	2008 GX_{33}	—	April 3, 2008	Mount Lemmon	Mount Lemmon Survey	EOS	1.8 km	MPC · JPL
295247	2008 GX_{36}	—	April 3, 2008	Kitt Peak	Spacewatch	·	1.8 km	MPC · JPL
295248	2008 GP_{38}	—	April 3, 2008	Mount Lemmon	Mount Lemmon Survey	·	3.6 km	MPC · JPL
295249	2008 GY_{38}	—	April 3, 2008	Mount Lemmon	Mount Lemmon Survey	·	2.2 km	MPC · JPL
295250	2008 GZ_{38}	—	April 3, 2008	Mount Lemmon	Mount Lemmon Survey	·	730 m	MPC · JPL
295251	2008 GQ_{40}	—	April 4, 2008	Kitt Peak	Spacewatch	WIT	1.0 km	MPC · JPL
295252	2008 GH_{41}	—	April 4, 2008	Kitt Peak	Spacewatch	·	5.0 km	MPC · JPL
295253	2008 GR_{43}	—	April 4, 2008	Mount Lemmon	Mount Lemmon Survey	·	2.2 km	MPC · JPL
295254	2008 GV_{45}	—	April 4, 2008	Kitt Peak	Spacewatch	·	3.4 km	MPC · JPL
295255	2008 GB_{47}	—	April 4, 2008	Kitt Peak	Spacewatch	·	800 m	MPC · JPL
295256	2008 GW_{49}	—	April 5, 2008	Kitt Peak	Spacewatch	L5	10 km	MPC · JPL
295257	2008 GK_{50}	—	April 5, 2008	Mount Lemmon	Mount Lemmon Survey	·	1.9 km	MPC · JPL
295258	2008 GM_{50}	—	April 5, 2008	Mount Lemmon	Mount Lemmon Survey	HOF	3.5 km	MPC · JPL
295259	2008 GQ_{51}	—	April 5, 2008	Mount Lemmon	Mount Lemmon Survey	·	1.7 km	MPC · JPL
295260	2008 GS_{56}	—	April 5, 2008	Mount Lemmon	Mount Lemmon Survey	·	2.2 km	MPC · JPL
295261	2008 GT_{58}	—	April 5, 2008	Mount Lemmon	Mount Lemmon Survey	·	2.0 km	MPC · JPL
295262	2008 GT_{59}	—	April 5, 2008	Kitt Peak	Spacewatch	·	2.4 km	MPC · JPL
295263	2008 GB_{60}	—	April 5, 2008	Kitt Peak	Spacewatch	·	2.5 km	MPC · JPL
295264	2008 GG_{65}	—	April 6, 2008	Kitt Peak	Spacewatch	·	3.2 km	MPC · JPL
295265	2008 GD_{66}	—	April 6, 2008	Mount Lemmon	Mount Lemmon Survey	VER	2.9 km	MPC · JPL
295266	2008 GB_{68}	—	April 6, 2008	Kitt Peak	Spacewatch	·	1.6 km	MPC · JPL
295267	2008 GL_{68}	—	April 6, 2008	Kitt Peak	Spacewatch	·	880 m	MPC · JPL
295268	2008 GX_{68}	—	April 6, 2008	Kitt Peak	Spacewatch	·	2.2 km	MPC · JPL
295269	2008 GF_{69}	—	April 6, 2008	Kitt Peak	Spacewatch	·	4.6 km	MPC · JPL
295270	2008 GQ_{72}	—	April 7, 2008	Mount Lemmon	Mount Lemmon Survey	·	900 m	MPC · JPL
295271	2008 GK_{73}	—	April 7, 2008	Mount Lemmon	Mount Lemmon Survey	·	2.6 km	MPC · JPL
295272	2008 GZ_{73}	—	April 7, 2008	Kitt Peak	Spacewatch	·	3.4 km	MPC · JPL
295273	2008 GW_{76}	—	April 7, 2008	Kitt Peak	Spacewatch	V	660 m	MPC · JPL
295274	2008 GP_{79}	—	April 7, 2008	Kitt Peak	Spacewatch	·	1.7 km	MPC · JPL
295275	2008 GC_{81}	—	April 7, 2008	Kitt Peak	Spacewatch	(6769)	1.4 km	MPC · JPL
295276	2008 GW_{81}	—	April 8, 2008	Kitt Peak	Spacewatch	·	930 m	MPC · JPL
295277	2008 GF_{84}	—	April 8, 2008	Kitt Peak	Spacewatch	·	1.1 km	MPC · JPL
295278	2008 GS_{87}	—	April 5, 2008	Mount Lemmon	Mount Lemmon Survey	V	700 m	MPC · JPL
295279	2008 GV_{90}	—	April 6, 2008	Mount Lemmon	Mount Lemmon Survey	·	1.6 km	MPC · JPL
295280	2008 GG_{93}	—	April 6, 2008	Catalina	CSS	·	1.5 km	MPC · JPL
295281	2008 GL_{93}	—	April 6, 2008	Catalina	CSS	GEF	2.0 km	MPC · JPL
295282	2008 GN_{93}	—	April 6, 2008	Catalina	CSS	·	3.0 km	MPC · JPL
295283	2008 GP_{93}	—	April 7, 2008	Kitt Peak	Spacewatch	·	3.4 km	MPC · JPL
295284	2008 GY_{94}	—	April 7, 2008	Mount Lemmon	Mount Lemmon Survey	·	4.1 km	MPC · JPL
295285	2008 GD_{95}	—	April 7, 2008	Catalina	CSS	slow	3.4 km	MPC · JPL
295286	2008 GG_{97}	—	April 8, 2008	Kitt Peak	Spacewatch	·	1.2 km	MPC · JPL
295287	2008 GC_{100}	—	April 9, 2008	Kitt Peak	Spacewatch	·	2.9 km	MPC · JPL
295288	2008 GU_{101}	—	April 10, 2008	Kitt Peak	Spacewatch	·	3.0 km	MPC · JPL
295289	2008 GZ_{101}	—	April 10, 2008	Kitt Peak	Spacewatch	·	4.0 km	MPC · JPL
295290	2008 GP_{102}	—	April 10, 2008	Kitt Peak	Spacewatch	·	2.4 km	MPC · JPL
295291	2008 GY_{103}	—	April 11, 2008	Kitt Peak	Spacewatch	·	2.3 km	MPC · JPL
295292	2008 GB_{105}	—	April 11, 2008	Kitt Peak	Spacewatch	·	1.1 km	MPC · JPL
295293	2008 GL_{105}	—	April 11, 2008	Catalina	CSS	·	2.6 km	MPC · JPL
295294	2008 GE_{106}	—	April 11, 2008	Mount Lemmon	Mount Lemmon Survey	·	2.0 km	MPC · JPL
295295	2008 GJ_{106}	—	April 11, 2008	Mount Lemmon	Mount Lemmon Survey	·	1.5 km	MPC · JPL
295296	2008 GE_{108}	—	April 13, 2008	Mount Lemmon	Mount Lemmon Survey	·	1.1 km	MPC · JPL
295297	2008 GL_{108}	—	April 13, 2008	Kitt Peak	Spacewatch	·	1.8 km	MPC · JPL
295298	2008 GP_{111}	—	April 8, 2008	Socorro	LINEAR	·	2.1 km	MPC · JPL
295299 Nannidiana	2008 GZ_{111}	Nannidiana	April 15, 2008	Charleston	R. Holmes	EUN	1.6 km	MPC · JPL
295300	2008 GR_{112}	—	April 10, 2008	Catalina	CSS	·	6.7 km	MPC · JPL

== 295301–295400 ==
back to top

Designation			Discovery			Properties		Ref
Permanent	Provisional	Named after	Date	Site	Discoverer(s)	Category	Diam.	Ref
295301	2008 GX_{112}	—	April 13, 2008	Catalina	CSS	EUN	1.6 km	MPC · JPL
295302	2008 GF_{113}	—	April 14, 2008	Catalina	CSS	·	6.1 km	MPC · JPL
295303	2008 GB_{115}	—	April 11, 2008	Kitt Peak	Spacewatch	·	3.9 km	MPC · JPL
295304	2008 GA_{117}	—	April 11, 2008	Kitt Peak	Spacewatch	·	5.1 km	MPC · JPL
295305	2008 GU_{117}	—	April 11, 2008	Catalina	CSS	·	4.2 km	MPC · JPL
295306	2008 GL_{119}	—	April 11, 2008	Kitt Peak	Spacewatch	·	4.0 km	MPC · JPL
295307	2008 GR_{120}	—	April 12, 2008	Catalina	CSS	LUT	6.5 km	MPC · JPL
295308	2008 GU_{122}	—	April 13, 2008	Kitt Peak	Spacewatch	MIS	3.1 km	MPC · JPL
295309	2008 GJ_{123}	—	April 13, 2008	Mount Lemmon	Mount Lemmon Survey	·	3.2 km	MPC · JPL
295310	2008 GY_{124}	—	April 14, 2008	Mount Lemmon	Mount Lemmon Survey	·	1.5 km	MPC · JPL
295311	2008 GJ_{127}	—	April 14, 2008	Mount Lemmon	Mount Lemmon Survey	·	1.9 km	MPC · JPL
295312	2008 GC_{129}	—	April 1, 2008	Kitt Peak	Spacewatch	·	2.2 km	MPC · JPL
295313	2008 GE_{130}	—	April 5, 2008	Catalina	CSS	V	820 m	MPC · JPL
295314	2008 GM_{130}	—	April 5, 2008	Kitt Peak	Spacewatch	·	1.2 km	MPC · JPL
295315	2008 GR_{131}	—	April 4, 2008	Kitt Peak	Spacewatch	L5	14 km	MPC · JPL
295316	2008 GZ_{132}	—	April 15, 2008	Kitt Peak	Spacewatch	·	2.3 km	MPC · JPL
295317	2008 GK_{133}	—	April 3, 2008	Kitt Peak	Spacewatch	·	1.5 km	MPC · JPL
295318	2008 GS_{133}	—	April 5, 2008	Kitt Peak	Spacewatch	SYL · CYB	4.6 km	MPC · JPL
295319	2008 GP_{134}	—	April 3, 2008	Kitt Peak	Spacewatch	·	640 m	MPC · JPL
295320	2008 GJ_{135}	—	April 3, 2008	Mount Lemmon	Mount Lemmon Survey	·	3.0 km	MPC · JPL
295321	2008 GT_{138}	—	April 7, 2008	Kitt Peak	Spacewatch	·	2.6 km	MPC · JPL
295322	2008 GM_{139}	—	April 4, 2008	Kitt Peak	Spacewatch	·	1.8 km	MPC · JPL
295323	2008 GV_{140}	—	April 11, 2008	Mount Lemmon	Mount Lemmon Survey	L5	10 km	MPC · JPL
295324	2008 GD_{141}	—	April 14, 2008	Mount Lemmon	Mount Lemmon Survey	VER	3.2 km	MPC · JPL
295325	2008 GH_{143}	—	April 6, 2008	Catalina	CSS	·	2.3 km	MPC · JPL
295326	2008 GQ_{143}	—	April 1, 2008	Mount Lemmon	Mount Lemmon Survey	L5	12 km	MPC · JPL
295327	2008 GZ_{144}	—	April 5, 2008	Socorro	LINEAR	·	2.2 km	MPC · JPL
295328	2008 HO	—	April 24, 2008	Mount Lemmon	Mount Lemmon Survey	·	2.1 km	MPC · JPL
295329	2008 HG_{2}	—	April 24, 2008	Andrushivka	Andrushivka	L5	10 km	MPC · JPL
295330	2008 HM_{2}	—	April 25, 2008	La Sagra	OAM	HYG	3.4 km	MPC · JPL
295331	2008 HL_{3}	—	April 28, 2008	La Sagra	OAM	·	3.0 km	MPC · JPL
295332	2008 HL_{4}	—	April 29, 2008	La Sagra	OAM	·	1.1 km	MPC · JPL
295333	2008 HN_{6}	—	April 24, 2008	Kitt Peak	Spacewatch	·	2.8 km	MPC · JPL
295334	2008 HR_{6}	—	April 24, 2008	Kitt Peak	Spacewatch	EOS	2.0 km	MPC · JPL
295335	2008 HE_{7}	—	April 24, 2008	Mount Lemmon	Mount Lemmon Survey	·	2.0 km	MPC · JPL
295336	2008 HY_{8}	—	April 24, 2008	Kitt Peak	Spacewatch	L5	13 km	MPC · JPL
295337	2008 HB_{9}	—	April 24, 2008	Kitt Peak	Spacewatch	L5	10 km	MPC · JPL
295338	2008 HY_{10}	—	April 24, 2008	Kitt Peak	Spacewatch	MAS	840 m	MPC · JPL
295339	2008 HJ_{12}	—	April 24, 2008	Kitt Peak	Spacewatch	·	1.1 km	MPC · JPL
295340	2008 HL_{12}	—	April 24, 2008	Kitt Peak	Spacewatch	L5	11 km	MPC · JPL
295341	2008 HK_{13}	—	April 25, 2008	Kitt Peak	Spacewatch	·	810 m	MPC · JPL
295342	2008 HU_{15}	—	April 25, 2008	Kitt Peak	Spacewatch	L5	10 km	MPC · JPL
295343	2008 HS_{16}	—	April 25, 2008	Mount Lemmon	Mount Lemmon Survey	·	1.5 km	MPC · JPL
295344	2008 HK_{17}	—	April 26, 2008	Kitt Peak	Spacewatch	·	1.6 km	MPC · JPL
295345	2008 HU_{17}	—	April 26, 2008	Kitt Peak	Spacewatch	·	2.9 km	MPC · JPL
295346	2008 HX_{21}	—	April 26, 2008	Mount Lemmon	Mount Lemmon Survey	·	3.2 km	MPC · JPL
295347	2008 HS_{24}	—	April 27, 2008	Kitt Peak	Spacewatch	L5	12 km	MPC · JPL
295348	2008 HY_{24}	—	April 27, 2008	Kitt Peak	Spacewatch	·	3.1 km	MPC · JPL
295349	2008 HV_{27}	—	April 28, 2008	Kitt Peak	Spacewatch	·	2.3 km	MPC · JPL
295350	2008 HY_{27}	—	April 28, 2008	Kitt Peak	Spacewatch	MAS	760 m	MPC · JPL
295351	2008 HY_{30}	—	December 6, 2005	Mount Lemmon	Mount Lemmon Survey	·	3.6 km	MPC · JPL
295352	2008 HH_{31}	—	April 29, 2008	Mount Lemmon	Mount Lemmon Survey	·	1.0 km	MPC · JPL
295353	2008 HN_{33}	—	April 25, 2008	Kitt Peak	Spacewatch	·	970 m	MPC · JPL
295354	2008 HO_{33}	—	April 26, 2008	Kitt Peak	Spacewatch	·	2.1 km	MPC · JPL
295355	2008 HR_{33}	—	April 26, 2008	Kitt Peak	Spacewatch	·	3.5 km	MPC · JPL
295356	2008 HP_{35}	—	April 29, 2008	Kitt Peak	Spacewatch	·	5.3 km	MPC · JPL
295357	2008 HB_{36}	—	April 29, 2008	Mount Lemmon	Mount Lemmon Survey	·	1.6 km	MPC · JPL
295358	2008 HD_{36}	—	April 29, 2008	Mount Lemmon	Mount Lemmon Survey	·	2.1 km	MPC · JPL
295359	2008 HL_{36}	—	April 30, 2008	Kitt Peak	Spacewatch	·	940 m	MPC · JPL
295360	2008 HF_{39}	—	April 26, 2008	Mount Lemmon	Mount Lemmon Survey	(5)	1.4 km	MPC · JPL
295361	2008 HM_{46}	—	April 28, 2008	Kitt Peak	Spacewatch	·	1.8 km	MPC · JPL
295362	2008 HO_{48}	—	April 29, 2008	Kitt Peak	Spacewatch	JUN	1.2 km	MPC · JPL
295363	2008 HX_{49}	—	April 29, 2008	Kitt Peak	Spacewatch	·	1.2 km	MPC · JPL
295364	2008 HA_{51}	—	April 29, 2008	Kitt Peak	Spacewatch	KOR	1.5 km	MPC · JPL
295365	2008 HM_{51}	—	April 29, 2008	Kitt Peak	Spacewatch	·	3.1 km	MPC · JPL
295366	2008 HO_{51}	—	April 29, 2008	Kitt Peak	Spacewatch	·	3.3 km	MPC · JPL
295367	2008 HV_{51}	—	April 29, 2008	Kitt Peak	Spacewatch	·	1.9 km	MPC · JPL
295368	2008 HW_{51}	—	April 29, 2008	Kitt Peak	Spacewatch	·	1.6 km	MPC · JPL
295369	2008 HY_{52}	—	April 29, 2008	Mount Lemmon	Mount Lemmon Survey	NYS	1.2 km	MPC · JPL
295370	2008 HK_{54}	—	April 29, 2008	Kitt Peak	Spacewatch	ARM	4.6 km	MPC · JPL
295371	2008 HR_{54}	—	April 29, 2008	Kitt Peak	Spacewatch	·	1.7 km	MPC · JPL
295372	2008 HR_{56}	—	April 30, 2008	Kitt Peak	Spacewatch	L5	9.3 km	MPC · JPL
295373	2008 HG_{60}	—	April 28, 2008	Mount Lemmon	Mount Lemmon Survey	·	5.1 km	MPC · JPL
295374	2008 HU_{60}	—	April 29, 2008	Mount Lemmon	Mount Lemmon Survey	·	2.1 km	MPC · JPL
295375	2008 HZ_{61}	—	April 30, 2008	Kitt Peak	Spacewatch	HYG	3.1 km	MPC · JPL
295376	2008 HZ_{63}	—	April 29, 2008	Mount Lemmon	Mount Lemmon Survey	·	2.0 km	MPC · JPL
295377	2008 HM_{64}	—	April 29, 2008	Catalina	CSS	·	890 m	MPC · JPL
295378	2008 HQ_{65}	—	April 29, 2008	Socorro	LINEAR	·	2.1 km	MPC · JPL
295379	2008 HS_{65}	—	April 29, 2008	Socorro	LINEAR	ADE	2.9 km	MPC · JPL
295380	2008 HT_{65}	—	April 29, 2008	Socorro	LINEAR	LIX	4.8 km	MPC · JPL
295381	2008 HR_{68}	—	April 24, 2008	Kitt Peak	Spacewatch	·	2.5 km	MPC · JPL
295382	2008 HU_{69}	—	April 29, 2008	Mount Lemmon	Mount Lemmon Survey	THM	2.9 km	MPC · JPL
295383	2008 HX_{69}	—	April 30, 2008	Mount Lemmon	Mount Lemmon Survey	L5	10 km	MPC · JPL
295384	2008 JL_{2}	—	May 2, 2008	Catalina	CSS	·	2.2 km	MPC · JPL
295385	2008 JB_{3}	—	May 2, 2008	Bergisch Gladbach	W. Bickel	·	2.9 km	MPC · JPL
295386	2008 JE_{4}	—	May 1, 2008	Kitt Peak	Spacewatch	·	4.2 km	MPC · JPL
295387	2008 JZ_{4}	—	May 2, 2008	Catalina	CSS	·	2.2 km	MPC · JPL
295388	2008 JD_{5}	—	May 3, 2008	Kitt Peak	Spacewatch	·	1.8 km	MPC · JPL
295389	2008 JK_{5}	—	May 3, 2008	Mount Lemmon	Mount Lemmon Survey	·	1.2 km	MPC · JPL
295390	2008 JG_{6}	—	May 2, 2008	Kitt Peak	Spacewatch	·	3.2 km	MPC · JPL
295391	2008 JP_{6}	—	May 2, 2008	Kitt Peak	Spacewatch	·	2.1 km	MPC · JPL
295392	2008 JT_{6}	—	May 2, 2008	Kitt Peak	Spacewatch	·	790 m	MPC · JPL
295393	2008 JF_{7}	—	May 2, 2008	Kitt Peak	Spacewatch	EOS	2.6 km	MPC · JPL
295394	2008 JJ_{7}	—	May 2, 2008	Kitt Peak	Spacewatch	·	3.1 km	MPC · JPL
295395	2008 JO_{7}	—	May 3, 2008	Mount Lemmon	Mount Lemmon Survey	L5	11 km	MPC · JPL
295396	2008 JW_{7}	—	May 5, 2008	Mount Lemmon	Mount Lemmon Survey	HIL · 3:2 · (3561)	7.5 km	MPC · JPL
295397	2008 JT_{8}	—	May 1, 2008	Catalina	CSS	·	2.3 km	MPC · JPL
295398	2008 JX_{8}	—	May 1, 2008	Catalina	CSS	PHO	1.2 km	MPC · JPL
295399	2008 JZ_{8}	—	May 1, 2008	Catalina	CSS	·	1.5 km	MPC · JPL
295400	2008 JU_{9}	—	May 3, 2008	Kitt Peak	Spacewatch	·	1.7 km	MPC · JPL

== 295401–295500 ==
back to top

Designation			Discovery			Properties		Ref
Permanent	Provisional	Named after	Date	Site	Discoverer(s)	Category	Diam.	Ref
295401	2008 JC_{10}	—	May 3, 2008	Kitt Peak	Spacewatch	·	1.9 km	MPC · JPL
295402	2008 JW_{11}	—	May 3, 2008	Kitt Peak	Spacewatch	·	1.5 km	MPC · JPL
295403	2008 JW_{13}	—	May 6, 2008	Mount Lemmon	Mount Lemmon Survey	·	3.0 km	MPC · JPL
295404	2008 JM_{15}	—	May 2, 2008	Kitt Peak	Spacewatch	·	3.0 km	MPC · JPL
295405	2008 JU_{15}	—	May 3, 2008	Kitt Peak	Spacewatch	·	1.1 km	MPC · JPL
295406	2008 JL_{20}	—	May 9, 2008	Siding Spring	SSS	H	890 m	MPC · JPL
295407	2008 JT_{20}	—	May 9, 2008	Grove Creek	Tozzi, F.	·	1.6 km	MPC · JPL
295408	2008 JF_{21}	—	May 10, 2008	Bergisch Gladbach	W. Bickel	·	4.3 km	MPC · JPL
295409	2008 JF_{22}	—	May 6, 2008	Siding Spring	SSS	·	1.8 km	MPC · JPL
295410	2008 JE_{26}	—	May 11, 2008	Catalina	CSS	·	4.2 km	MPC · JPL
295411	2008 JH_{28}	—	May 8, 2008	Kitt Peak	Spacewatch	·	2.7 km	MPC · JPL
295412	2008 JR_{28}	—	May 8, 2008	Kitt Peak	Spacewatch	L5	10 km	MPC · JPL
295413	2008 JH_{30}	—	May 11, 2008	Kitt Peak	Spacewatch	L5	10 km	MPC · JPL
295414	2008 JU_{31}	—	May 5, 2008	Catalina	CSS	·	7.7 km	MPC · JPL
295415	2008 JV_{35}	—	May 2, 2008	Kitt Peak	Spacewatch	·	1.6 km	MPC · JPL
295416	2008 JF_{36}	—	May 3, 2008	Mount Lemmon	Mount Lemmon Survey	NYS	1.2 km	MPC · JPL
295417	2008 JS_{37}	—	May 6, 2008	Siding Spring	SSS	·	2.5 km	MPC · JPL
295418	2008 JU_{40}	—	May 5, 2008	Mount Lemmon	Mount Lemmon Survey	·	2.3 km	MPC · JPL
295419	2008 KX_{4}	—	May 27, 2008	Kitt Peak	Spacewatch	V	510 m	MPC · JPL
295420	2008 KZ_{4}	—	May 27, 2008	Kitt Peak	Spacewatch	·	3.1 km	MPC · JPL
295421	2008 KX_{5}	—	May 28, 2008	Kitt Peak	Spacewatch	·	2.2 km	MPC · JPL
295422	2008 KS_{7}	—	May 27, 2008	Kitt Peak	Spacewatch	·	1.7 km	MPC · JPL
295423	2008 KB_{13}	—	May 27, 2008	Kitt Peak	Spacewatch	·	1.6 km	MPC · JPL
295424	2008 KM_{25}	—	May 29, 2008	Mount Lemmon	Mount Lemmon Survey	·	1.8 km	MPC · JPL
295425	2008 KP_{26}	—	May 29, 2008	Kitt Peak	Spacewatch	EMA	5.7 km	MPC · JPL
295426	2008 KT_{26}	—	May 29, 2008	Kitt Peak	Spacewatch	·	2.4 km	MPC · JPL
295427	2008 KU_{29}	—	May 29, 2008	Kitt Peak	Spacewatch	·	1.3 km	MPC · JPL
295428	2008 KW_{31}	—	May 29, 2008	Kitt Peak	Spacewatch	·	3.3 km	MPC · JPL
295429	2008 KY_{31}	—	May 29, 2008	Kitt Peak	Spacewatch	·	2.2 km	MPC · JPL
295430	2008 KU_{33}	—	May 29, 2008	Mount Lemmon	Mount Lemmon Survey	(2076)	730 m	MPC · JPL
295431	2008 KG_{36}	—	May 29, 2008	Kitt Peak	Spacewatch	L5	13 km	MPC · JPL
295432	2008 KT_{37}	—	May 30, 2008	Kitt Peak	Spacewatch	L5	10 km	MPC · JPL
295433	2008 KW_{38}	—	May 30, 2008	Kitt Peak	Spacewatch	·	1.7 km	MPC · JPL
295434	2008 KS_{40}	—	May 29, 2008	Mount Lemmon	Mount Lemmon Survey	VER	2.5 km	MPC · JPL
295435	2008 KL_{41}	—	May 30, 2008	Kitt Peak	Spacewatch	·	1.2 km	MPC · JPL
295436	2008 LS_{4}	—	June 3, 2008	Mount Lemmon	Mount Lemmon Survey	EOS	2.8 km	MPC · JPL
295437	2008 LF_{6}	—	June 3, 2008	Kitt Peak	Spacewatch	L5	9.7 km	MPC · JPL
295438	2008 LK_{10}	—	June 6, 2008	Kitt Peak	Spacewatch	HOF	3.0 km	MPC · JPL
295439	2008 LQ_{10}	—	June 6, 2008	Kitt Peak	Spacewatch	EOS	3.0 km	MPC · JPL
295440	2008 LF_{12}	—	June 7, 2008	Kitt Peak	Spacewatch	·	3.1 km	MPC · JPL
295441	2008 LU_{15}	—	June 10, 2008	Kitt Peak	Spacewatch	·	1.8 km	MPC · JPL
295442	2008 LU_{16}	—	June 15, 2008	Wrightwood	J. W. Young	·	1.5 km	MPC · JPL
295443	2008 ML	—	June 24, 2008	Siding Spring	SSS	·	3.2 km	MPC · JPL
295444	2008 MN	—	June 24, 2008	Skylive	Tozzi, F.	T_{j} (2.93)	4.7 km	MPC · JPL
295445	2008 ND	—	July 1, 2008	Kitt Peak	Spacewatch	·	2.8 km	MPC · JPL
295446	2008 OB_{3}	—	July 28, 2008	La Sagra	OAM	·	6.4 km	MPC · JPL
295447	2008 OW_{20}	—	July 29, 2008	Kitt Peak	Spacewatch	·	2.8 km	MPC · JPL
295448	2008 OO_{21}	—	July 30, 2008	Kitt Peak	Spacewatch	KOR	1.4 km	MPC · JPL
295449	2008 OX_{22}	—	July 29, 2008	Kitt Peak	Spacewatch	L4	9.0 km	MPC · JPL
295450	2008 OR_{23}	—	July 30, 2008	Kitt Peak	Spacewatch	·	5.1 km	MPC · JPL
295451	2008 OW_{23}	—	July 30, 2008	Kitt Peak	Spacewatch	·	1.7 km	MPC · JPL
295452	2008 OF_{24}	—	July 30, 2008	Kitt Peak	Spacewatch	KOR	1.4 km	MPC · JPL
295453	2008 OJ_{24}	—	July 30, 2008	Mount Lemmon	Mount Lemmon Survey	·	1.6 km	MPC · JPL
295454	2008 PW_{1}	—	August 2, 2008	La Sagra	OAM	·	1.8 km	MPC · JPL
295455	2008 PT_{2}	—	August 3, 2008	Socorro	LINEAR	·	4.1 km	MPC · JPL
295456	2008 PB_{4}	—	August 5, 2008	La Sagra	OAM	(1547)	2.4 km	MPC · JPL
295457	2008 PC_{4}	—	August 5, 2008	La Sagra	OAM	V	990 m	MPC · JPL
295458	2008 PA_{5}	—	August 4, 2008	La Sagra	OAM	·	4.8 km	MPC · JPL
295459	2008 PD_{10}	—	August 5, 2008	La Sagra	OAM	·	4.1 km	MPC · JPL
295460	2008 PO_{11}	—	August 9, 2008	La Sagra	OAM	·	2.5 km	MPC · JPL
295461	2008 PU_{12}	—	August 9, 2008	La Sagra	OAM	·	2.6 km	MPC · JPL
295462	2008 PS_{14}	—	August 10, 2008	Dauban	Kugel, F.	(5)	1.4 km	MPC · JPL
295463	2008 PZ_{18}	—	August 7, 2008	Kitt Peak	Spacewatch	·	1.0 km	MPC · JPL
295464	2008 QN_{1}	—	August 23, 2008	La Sagra	OAM	·	2.7 km	MPC · JPL
295465	2008 QQ_{1}	—	August 23, 2008	La Sagra	OAM	·	2.4 km	MPC · JPL
295466	2008 QE_{2}	—	August 24, 2008	La Sagra	OAM	·	2.2 km	MPC · JPL
295467	2008 QH_{3}	—	August 25, 2008	Sandlot	G. Hug	·	1.3 km	MPC · JPL
295468	2008 QZ_{4}	—	August 22, 2008	Kitt Peak	Spacewatch	JUN	1.6 km	MPC · JPL
295469	2008 QU_{7}	—	August 26, 2008	Hibiscus	S. F. Hönig, Teamo, N.	(194)	2.0 km	MPC · JPL
295470	2008 QG_{11}	—	August 26, 2008	La Sagra	OAM	·	2.1 km	MPC · JPL
295471 Herbertnitsch	2008 QM_{11}	Herbertnitsch	August 27, 2008	Vallemare Borbona	V. S. Casulli	·	2.0 km	MPC · JPL
295472 Puy	2008 QJ_{14}	Puy	August 26, 2008	Parc National des Cévennes	C. Demeautis, J.-M. Lopez	·	2.5 km	MPC · JPL
295473 Cochard	2008 QD_{16}	Cochard	August 27, 2008	Pises	Lopez, J. M., Cavadore, C.	·	2.3 km	MPC · JPL
295474	2008 QB_{18}	—	August 28, 2008	Vicques	M. Ory	·	1.4 km	MPC · JPL
295475	2008 QM_{18}	—	August 28, 2008	Pla D'Arguines	R. Ferrando	EUN	1.0 km	MPC · JPL
295476	2008 QN_{23}	—	August 29, 2008	Taunus	E. Schwab, R. Kling	EOS	2.3 km	MPC · JPL
295477	2008 QE_{26}	—	August 29, 2008	La Sagra	OAM	·	2.4 km	MPC · JPL
295478	2008 QC_{27}	—	August 30, 2008	La Sagra	OAM	VER	3.8 km	MPC · JPL
295479	2008 QP_{30}	—	August 30, 2008	Socorro	LINEAR	·	2.7 km	MPC · JPL
295480	2008 QC_{37}	—	August 21, 2008	Kitt Peak	Spacewatch	·	1.7 km	MPC · JPL
295481	2008 QH_{37}	—	August 21, 2008	Kitt Peak	Spacewatch	L4	12 km	MPC · JPL
295482	2008 QX_{37}	—	August 22, 2008	Kitt Peak	Spacewatch	THM	3.9 km	MPC · JPL
295483	2008 QG_{39}	—	August 24, 2008	Kitt Peak	Spacewatch	·	3.1 km	MPC · JPL
295484	2008 QX_{47}	—	August 23, 2008	Socorro	LINEAR	·	1.5 km	MPC · JPL
295485	2008 QB_{48}	—	August 26, 2008	Socorro	LINEAR	EOS	2.9 km	MPC · JPL
295486	2008 RP_{2}	—	September 2, 2008	Kitt Peak	Spacewatch	·	3.3 km	MPC · JPL
295487	2008 RO_{3}	—	September 2, 2008	Kitt Peak	Spacewatch	·	2.9 km	MPC · JPL
295488	2008 RF_{14}	—	September 4, 2008	Kitt Peak	Spacewatch	L4	9.9 km	MPC · JPL
295489	2008 RO_{17}	—	September 4, 2008	Kitt Peak	Spacewatch	·	2.0 km	MPC · JPL
295490	2008 RD_{18}	—	September 4, 2008	Kitt Peak	Spacewatch	L4	10 km	MPC · JPL
295491	2008 RO_{20}	—	September 4, 2008	Kitt Peak	Spacewatch	L4	8.1 km	MPC · JPL
295492 Adrianprakhov	2008 RT_{22}	Adrianprakhov	September 5, 2008	Andrushivka	Andrushivka	NYS	1.4 km	MPC · JPL
295493	2008 RL_{23}	—	September 4, 2008	Socorro	LINEAR	·	1.2 km	MPC · JPL
295494	2008 RQ_{32}	—	September 2, 2008	Kitt Peak	Spacewatch	KOR	1.5 km	MPC · JPL
295495	2008 RU_{32}	—	September 2, 2008	Kitt Peak	Spacewatch	·	2.3 km	MPC · JPL
295496	2008 RV_{35}	—	September 2, 2008	Kitt Peak	Spacewatch	·	2.5 km	MPC · JPL
295497	2008 RE_{37}	—	September 2, 2008	Kitt Peak	Spacewatch	L4	10 km	MPC · JPL
295498	2008 RN_{41}	—	September 2, 2008	Kitt Peak	Spacewatch	·	2.2 km	MPC · JPL
295499	2008 RW_{44}	—	September 2, 2008	Kitt Peak	Spacewatch	·	990 m	MPC · JPL
295500	2008 RQ_{45}	—	September 2, 2008	Kitt Peak	Spacewatch	L4 · ERY	7.7 km	MPC · JPL

== 295501–295600 ==
back to top

Designation			Discovery			Properties		Ref
Permanent	Provisional	Named after	Date	Site	Discoverer(s)	Category	Diam.	Ref
295501	2008 RG_{51}	—	September 3, 2008	Kitt Peak	Spacewatch	·	1.4 km	MPC · JPL
295502	2008 RM_{51}	—	September 3, 2008	Kitt Peak	Spacewatch	L4	9.2 km	MPC · JPL
295503	2008 RE_{55}	—	September 3, 2008	Kitt Peak	Spacewatch	L4 · ERY	8.8 km	MPC · JPL
295504	2008 RF_{57}	—	September 3, 2008	Kitt Peak	Spacewatch	L4	12 km	MPC · JPL
295505	2008 RD_{60}	—	September 4, 2008	Kitt Peak	Spacewatch	·	4.1 km	MPC · JPL
295506	2008 RR_{62}	—	September 4, 2008	Kitt Peak	Spacewatch	·	750 m	MPC · JPL
295507	2008 RO_{64}	—	September 4, 2008	Kitt Peak	Spacewatch	·	2.9 km	MPC · JPL
295508	2008 RX_{66}	—	September 4, 2008	Kitt Peak	Spacewatch	NYS	1.4 km	MPC · JPL
295509	2008 RQ_{73}	—	September 6, 2008	Catalina	CSS	L4	10 km	MPC · JPL
295510	2008 RE_{74}	—	September 6, 2008	Catalina	CSS	·	720 m	MPC · JPL
295511	2008 RH_{75}	—	September 6, 2008	Catalina	CSS	PHO	4.0 km	MPC · JPL
295512	2008 RR_{75}	—	September 6, 2008	Mount Lemmon	Mount Lemmon Survey	·	1.3 km	MPC · JPL
295513	2008 RR_{82}	—	September 4, 2008	Kitt Peak	Spacewatch	L4 · ERY	7.7 km	MPC · JPL
295514	2008 RW_{86}	—	September 5, 2008	Kitt Peak	Spacewatch	EOS	2.7 km	MPC · JPL
295515	2008 RP_{88}	—	September 5, 2008	Kitt Peak	Spacewatch	EOS	2.7 km	MPC · JPL
295516	2008 RN_{92}	—	September 6, 2008	Kitt Peak	Spacewatch	·	1.7 km	MPC · JPL
295517	2008 RP_{102}	—	September 4, 2008	Kitt Peak	Spacewatch	·	1.1 km	MPC · JPL
295518	2008 RF_{103}	—	September 5, 2008	Kitt Peak	Spacewatch	·	1.8 km	MPC · JPL
295519	2008 RK_{109}	—	September 2, 2008	Kitt Peak	Spacewatch	HYG	3.2 km	MPC · JPL
295520	2008 RP_{112}	—	September 5, 2008	Kitt Peak	Spacewatch	L4	11 km	MPC · JPL
295521	2008 RA_{114}	—	September 6, 2008	Kitt Peak	Spacewatch	·	2.1 km	MPC · JPL
295522	2008 RV_{115}	—	September 7, 2008	Mount Lemmon	Mount Lemmon Survey	·	2.1 km	MPC · JPL
295523	2008 RA_{116}	—	September 7, 2008	Mount Lemmon	Mount Lemmon Survey	·	1.1 km	MPC · JPL
295524	2008 RY_{116}	—	September 7, 2008	Mount Lemmon	Mount Lemmon Survey	HYG	3.0 km	MPC · JPL
295525	2008 RK_{117}	—	September 9, 2008	Mount Lemmon	Mount Lemmon Survey	·	3.8 km	MPC · JPL
295526	2008 RC_{118}	—	September 9, 2008	Mount Lemmon	Mount Lemmon Survey	·	1.8 km	MPC · JPL
295527	2008 RV_{119}	—	September 4, 2008	Kitt Peak	Spacewatch	L4	12 km	MPC · JPL
295528	2008 RZ_{119}	—	September 6, 2008	Kitt Peak	Spacewatch	L4	8.7 km	MPC · JPL
295529	2008 RK_{121}	—	September 2, 2008	Kitt Peak	Spacewatch	L4	11 km	MPC · JPL
295530	2008 RC_{124}	—	September 6, 2008	Mount Lemmon	Mount Lemmon Survey	L4	8.3 km	MPC · JPL
295531	2008 RK_{125}	—	September 7, 2008	Mount Lemmon	Mount Lemmon Survey	L4	11 km	MPC · JPL
295532	2008 RV_{127}	—	September 6, 2008	Mount Lemmon	Mount Lemmon Survey	·	2.4 km	MPC · JPL
295533	2008 RV_{131}	—	September 7, 2008	Catalina	CSS	·	1.4 km	MPC · JPL
295534	2008 RH_{133}	—	September 6, 2008	Catalina	CSS	·	5.4 km	MPC · JPL
295535	2008 RH_{134}	—	September 6, 2008	Catalina	CSS	SUL	2.5 km	MPC · JPL
295536	2008 RD_{138}	—	September 6, 2008	Mount Lemmon	Mount Lemmon Survey	·	3.9 km	MPC · JPL
295537	2008 RF_{138}	—	September 6, 2008	Catalina	CSS	·	5.4 km	MPC · JPL
295538	2008 RO_{141}	—	September 6, 2008	Mount Lemmon	Mount Lemmon Survey	·	2.3 km	MPC · JPL
295539	2008 RL_{142}	—	September 7, 2008	Socorro	LINEAR	·	5.1 km	MPC · JPL
295540	2008 RR_{142}	—	September 7, 2008	Socorro	LINEAR	·	4.2 km	MPC · JPL
295541	2008 SK_{1}	—	September 22, 2008	Sierra Stars	Tozzi, F.	·	3.8 km	MPC · JPL
295542	2008 SC_{2}	—	September 22, 2008	Hibiscus	Teamo, N.	·	3.1 km	MPC · JPL
295543	2008 SK_{3}	—	September 22, 2008	Socorro	LINEAR	MAS	810 m	MPC · JPL
295544	2008 SK_{7}	—	September 22, 2008	Goodricke-Pigott	R. A. Tucker	·	1.5 km	MPC · JPL
295545	2008 SF_{9}	—	September 22, 2008	Socorro	LINEAR	·	1.5 km	MPC · JPL
295546	2008 SB_{11}	—	September 23, 2008	Socorro	LINEAR	EUN	1.6 km	MPC · JPL
295547	2008 SU_{13}	—	September 19, 2008	Kitt Peak	Spacewatch	WIT	1.3 km	MPC · JPL
295548	2008 SR_{14}	—	September 19, 2008	Kitt Peak	Spacewatch	·	950 m	MPC · JPL
295549	2008 SL_{20}	—	September 19, 2008	Kitt Peak	Spacewatch	·	1.1 km	MPC · JPL
295550	2008 SC_{21}	—	September 19, 2008	Kitt Peak	Spacewatch	·	3.0 km	MPC · JPL
295551	2008 SH_{26}	—	September 19, 2008	Kitt Peak	Spacewatch	NYS	1.4 km	MPC · JPL
295552	2008 SU_{41}	—	September 20, 2008	Mount Lemmon	Mount Lemmon Survey	·	960 m	MPC · JPL
295553	2008 SO_{42}	—	September 20, 2008	Kitt Peak	Spacewatch	L4	8.5 km	MPC · JPL
295554	2008 SS_{42}	—	September 20, 2008	Kitt Peak	Spacewatch	·	3.1 km	MPC · JPL
295555	2008 SX_{52}	—	September 20, 2008	Mount Lemmon	Mount Lemmon Survey	·	1.9 km	MPC · JPL
295556	2008 SJ_{54}	—	September 20, 2008	Mount Lemmon	Mount Lemmon Survey	·	690 m	MPC · JPL
295557	2008 SQ_{54}	—	September 20, 2008	Mount Lemmon	Mount Lemmon Survey	·	3.3 km	MPC · JPL
295558	2008 SM_{55}	—	September 20, 2008	Mount Lemmon	Mount Lemmon Survey	L4	9.7 km	MPC · JPL
295559	2008 SC_{56}	—	September 20, 2008	Kitt Peak	Spacewatch	·	730 m	MPC · JPL
295560	2008 SV_{62}	—	September 21, 2008	Kitt Peak	Spacewatch	·	2.9 km	MPC · JPL
295561	2008 SX_{65}	—	September 21, 2008	Mount Lemmon	Mount Lemmon Survey	·	3.3 km	MPC · JPL
295562	2008 SO_{66}	—	September 21, 2008	Catalina	CSS	HIL · 3:2	6.5 km	MPC · JPL
295563	2008 SJ_{68}	—	September 21, 2008	Mount Lemmon	Mount Lemmon Survey	·	3.5 km	MPC · JPL
295564	2008 ST_{72}	—	September 22, 2008	Mount Lemmon	Mount Lemmon Survey	·	960 m	MPC · JPL
295565 Hannover	2008 SL_{83}	Hannover	September 27, 2008	Taunus	Karge, S., E. Schwab	·	1.7 km	MPC · JPL
295566	2008 ST_{83}	—	September 28, 2008	Altschwendt	W. Ries	·	1.1 km	MPC · JPL
295567	2008 SF_{86}	—	September 20, 2008	Kitt Peak	Spacewatch	·	1.6 km	MPC · JPL
295568	2008 SJ_{91}	—	September 21, 2008	Kitt Peak	Spacewatch	EOS	2.8 km	MPC · JPL
295569	2008 SF_{92}	—	September 21, 2008	Kitt Peak	Spacewatch	·	1.7 km	MPC · JPL
295570	2008 SN_{95}	—	September 21, 2008	Kitt Peak	Spacewatch	·	2.1 km	MPC · JPL
295571	2008 SA_{96}	—	September 21, 2008	Kitt Peak	Spacewatch	·	1.9 km	MPC · JPL
295572	2008 SH_{98}	—	September 21, 2008	Kitt Peak	Spacewatch	·	1.2 km	MPC · JPL
295573	2008 SQ_{102}	—	September 21, 2008	Mount Lemmon	Mount Lemmon Survey	·	830 m	MPC · JPL
295574	2008 SW_{103}	—	September 21, 2008	Kitt Peak	Spacewatch	·	1.7 km	MPC · JPL
295575	2008 SX_{104}	—	September 21, 2008	Kitt Peak	Spacewatch	NEM	2.8 km	MPC · JPL
295576	2008 SB_{107}	—	September 21, 2008	Kitt Peak	Spacewatch	AGN	1.5 km	MPC · JPL
295577	2008 SM_{107}	—	September 22, 2008	Kitt Peak	Spacewatch	·	3.2 km	MPC · JPL
295578	2008 SM_{108}	—	September 22, 2008	Mount Lemmon	Mount Lemmon Survey	L4	10 km	MPC · JPL
295579	2008 SG_{110}	—	September 22, 2008	Kitt Peak	Spacewatch	·	1.6 km	MPC · JPL
295580	2008 SO_{110}	—	September 22, 2008	Kitt Peak	Spacewatch	·	1.5 km	MPC · JPL
295581	2008 ST_{112}	—	September 22, 2008	Kitt Peak	Spacewatch	·	2.9 km	MPC · JPL
295582	2008 SW_{114}	—	September 22, 2008	Kitt Peak	Spacewatch	·	6.4 km	MPC · JPL
295583	2008 SV_{117}	—	September 22, 2008	Mount Lemmon	Mount Lemmon Survey	·	570 m	MPC · JPL
295584	2008 SE_{123}	—	September 22, 2008	Mount Lemmon	Mount Lemmon Survey	·	2.0 km	MPC · JPL
295585	2008 SS_{124}	—	September 22, 2008	Mount Lemmon	Mount Lemmon Survey	·	760 m	MPC · JPL
295586	2008 SC_{129}	—	September 22, 2008	Kitt Peak	Spacewatch	(194)	1.9 km	MPC · JPL
295587	2008 SL_{130}	—	September 22, 2008	Kitt Peak	Spacewatch	·	2.9 km	MPC · JPL
295588	2008 SW_{132}	—	September 22, 2008	Kitt Peak	Spacewatch	AGN	1.3 km	MPC · JPL
295589	2008 SZ_{132}	—	September 22, 2008	Kitt Peak	Spacewatch	·	760 m	MPC · JPL
295590	2008 SR_{134}	—	September 23, 2008	Kitt Peak	Spacewatch	fast	1.5 km	MPC · JPL
295591	2008 SA_{136}	—	September 23, 2008	Mount Lemmon	Mount Lemmon Survey	L4	9.9 km	MPC · JPL
295592	2008 SF_{138}	—	September 23, 2008	Kitt Peak	Spacewatch	V	890 m	MPC · JPL
295593	2008 SB_{139}	—	September 23, 2008	Kitt Peak	Spacewatch	·	860 m	MPC · JPL
295594	2008 SL_{145}	—	September 20, 2008	Kitt Peak	Spacewatch	·	2.6 km	MPC · JPL
295595	2008 SE_{146}	—	September 23, 2008	Kitt Peak	Spacewatch	V	760 m	MPC · JPL
295596	2008 SL_{146}	—	September 23, 2008	Kitt Peak	Spacewatch	EOS	4.8 km	MPC · JPL
295597	2008 SP_{161}	—	September 28, 2008	Socorro	LINEAR	THM	2.6 km	MPC · JPL
295598	2008 SA_{168}	—	September 28, 2008	Socorro	LINEAR	·	690 m	MPC · JPL
295599	2008 SY_{169}	—	September 21, 2008	Mount Lemmon	Mount Lemmon Survey	L4	8.9 km	MPC · JPL
295600	2008 SR_{173}	—	September 22, 2008	Kitt Peak	Spacewatch	·	830 m	MPC · JPL

== 295601–295700 ==
back to top

Designation			Discovery			Properties		Ref
Permanent	Provisional	Named after	Date	Site	Discoverer(s)	Category	Diam.	Ref
295601	2008 SJ_{175}	—	September 23, 2008	Kitt Peak	Spacewatch	·	2.2 km	MPC · JPL
295602	2008 SN_{176}	—	September 23, 2008	Mount Lemmon	Mount Lemmon Survey	·	720 m	MPC · JPL
295603	2008 SW_{176}	—	September 23, 2008	Mount Lemmon	Mount Lemmon Survey	·	810 m	MPC · JPL
295604	2008 SO_{177}	—	September 23, 2008	Kitt Peak	Spacewatch	AGN	1.5 km	MPC · JPL
295605	2008 SC_{181}	—	September 24, 2008	Kitt Peak	Spacewatch	·	1.1 km	MPC · JPL
295606	2008 SP_{182}	—	March 11, 2007	Kitt Peak	Spacewatch	·	810 m	MPC · JPL
295607	2008 SD_{185}	—	September 24, 2008	Kitt Peak	Spacewatch	·	1.9 km	MPC · JPL
295608	2008 SY_{187}	—	September 25, 2008	Kitt Peak	Spacewatch	V	800 m	MPC · JPL
295609	2008 SA_{194}	—	September 25, 2008	Kitt Peak	Spacewatch	·	1.7 km	MPC · JPL
295610	2008 SC_{194}	—	September 25, 2008	Kitt Peak	Spacewatch	·	1.1 km	MPC · JPL
295611	2008 SM_{195}	—	September 25, 2008	Kitt Peak	Spacewatch	·	1.9 km	MPC · JPL
295612	2008 SH_{196}	—	September 25, 2008	Kitt Peak	Spacewatch	EUN	1.3 km	MPC · JPL
295613	2008 SB_{197}	—	September 25, 2008	Kitt Peak	Spacewatch	·	2.6 km	MPC · JPL
295614	2008 SB_{198}	—	September 25, 2008	Kitt Peak	Spacewatch	·	1.2 km	MPC · JPL
295615	2008 SB_{202}	—	September 26, 2008	Kitt Peak	Spacewatch	·	1.9 km	MPC · JPL
295616	2008 SN_{204}	—	September 26, 2008	Kitt Peak	Spacewatch	·	4.6 km	MPC · JPL
295617	2008 SA_{208}	—	September 27, 2008	Catalina	CSS	·	2.9 km	MPC · JPL
295618	2008 SL_{213}	—	September 29, 2008	Mount Lemmon	Mount Lemmon Survey	L4	8.9 km	MPC · JPL
295619	2008 SJ_{218}	—	September 30, 2008	La Sagra	OAM	·	2.3 km	MPC · JPL
295620	2008 SM_{223}	—	September 25, 2008	Mount Lemmon	Mount Lemmon Survey	·	630 m	MPC · JPL
295621	2008 SO_{223}	—	September 25, 2008	Mount Lemmon	Mount Lemmon Survey	L4	8.6 km	MPC · JPL
295622	2008 SH_{224}	—	September 26, 2008	Kitt Peak	Spacewatch	·	690 m	MPC · JPL
295623	2008 ST_{224}	—	September 26, 2008	Kitt Peak	Spacewatch	·	3.3 km	MPC · JPL
295624	2008 SC_{225}	—	September 26, 2008	Kitt Peak	Spacewatch	·	1.3 km	MPC · JPL
295625	2008 SM_{232}	—	September 28, 2008	Mount Lemmon	Mount Lemmon Survey	L4	10 km	MPC · JPL
295626	2008 SS_{235}	—	September 28, 2008	Kitt Peak	Spacewatch	·	2.9 km	MPC · JPL
295627	2008 SF_{236}	—	September 29, 2008	Kitt Peak	Spacewatch	L4	12 km	MPC · JPL
295628	2008 SP_{236}	—	September 29, 2008	Kitt Peak	Spacewatch	ELF	5.6 km	MPC · JPL
295629	2008 SA_{237}	—	September 29, 2008	Kitt Peak	Spacewatch	·	850 m	MPC · JPL
295630	2008 SZ_{244}	—	September 29, 2008	Catalina	CSS	L4	11 km	MPC · JPL
295631	2008 SR_{248}	—	September 21, 2008	Kitt Peak	Spacewatch	·	1.5 km	MPC · JPL
295632	2008 SS_{249}	—	September 23, 2008	Kitt Peak	Spacewatch	·	5.8 km	MPC · JPL
295633	2008 SP_{251}	—	September 25, 2008	Kitt Peak	Spacewatch	(5)	1.2 km	MPC · JPL
295634	2008 SJ_{253}	—	September 21, 2008	Catalina	CSS	L4	14 km	MPC · JPL
295635	2008 SN_{253}	—	September 21, 2008	Kitt Peak	Spacewatch	·	1.4 km	MPC · JPL
295636	2008 SO_{253}	—	September 21, 2008	Kitt Peak	Spacewatch	·	2.6 km	MPC · JPL
295637	2008 SE_{254}	—	September 22, 2008	Kitt Peak	Spacewatch	·	2.1 km	MPC · JPL
295638	2008 SN_{254}	—	September 22, 2008	Mount Lemmon	Mount Lemmon Survey	·	1.1 km	MPC · JPL
295639	2008 SF_{256}	—	September 20, 2008	Kitt Peak	Spacewatch	AST	2.9 km	MPC · JPL
295640	2008 SZ_{257}	—	September 22, 2008	Mount Lemmon	Mount Lemmon Survey	·	2.2 km	MPC · JPL
295641	2008 SE_{261}	—	September 23, 2008	Kitt Peak	Spacewatch	·	880 m	MPC · JPL
295642	2008 SW_{264}	—	September 26, 2008	Kitt Peak	Spacewatch	·	1.4 km	MPC · JPL
295643	2008 SR_{273}	—	September 28, 2008	Kitt Peak	Spacewatch	·	2.1 km	MPC · JPL
295644	2008 SH_{278}	—	September 29, 2008	Mount Lemmon	Mount Lemmon Survey	L4	9.5 km	MPC · JPL
295645	2008 SP_{279}	—	September 24, 2008	Kitt Peak	Spacewatch	L4	8.9 km	MPC · JPL
295646	2008 SG_{280}	—	September 29, 2008	Kitt Peak	Spacewatch	·	1.7 km	MPC · JPL
295647	2008 SC_{293}	—	September 22, 2008	Catalina	CSS	·	2.3 km	MPC · JPL
295648	2008 SR_{297}	—	September 28, 2008	Mount Lemmon	Mount Lemmon Survey	·	2.3 km	MPC · JPL
295649	2008 SX_{301}	—	September 23, 2008	Socorro	LINEAR	·	3.4 km	MPC · JPL
295650	2008 SD_{305}	—	September 26, 2008	Kitt Peak	Spacewatch	·	810 m	MPC · JPL
295651	2008 ST_{307}	—	September 29, 2008	Mount Lemmon	Mount Lemmon Survey	EOS	3.2 km	MPC · JPL
295652	2008 TT	—	October 1, 2008	Hibiscus	S. F. Hönig, Teamo, N.	·	2.7 km	MPC · JPL
295653	2008 TX_{4}	—	October 1, 2008	La Sagra	OAM	L4 · ERY	11 km	MPC · JPL
295654	2008 TQ_{6}	—	October 3, 2008	La Sagra	OAM	·	2.3 km	MPC · JPL
295655	2008 TJ_{7}	—	October 3, 2008	La Sagra	OAM	·	1.8 km	MPC · JPL
295656	2008 TV_{7}	—	October 4, 2008	La Sagra	OAM	·	6.7 km	MPC · JPL
295657	2008 TP_{19}	—	October 1, 2008	Mount Lemmon	Mount Lemmon Survey	MAR	1.2 km	MPC · JPL
295658	2008 TB_{30}	—	October 1, 2008	Mount Lemmon	Mount Lemmon Survey	·	1.6 km	MPC · JPL
295659	2008 TM_{33}	—	October 1, 2008	Kitt Peak	Spacewatch	·	750 m	MPC · JPL
295660	2008 TA_{41}	—	October 1, 2008	Mount Lemmon	Mount Lemmon Survey	·	2.6 km	MPC · JPL
295661	2008 TZ_{43}	—	October 1, 2008	Mount Lemmon	Mount Lemmon Survey	·	1.5 km	MPC · JPL
295662	2008 TH_{45}	—	October 1, 2008	Mount Lemmon	Mount Lemmon Survey	·	1.6 km	MPC · JPL
295663	2008 TK_{47}	—	October 1, 2008	Kitt Peak	Spacewatch	·	1.6 km	MPC · JPL
295664	2008 TT_{48}	—	October 2, 2008	Kitt Peak	Spacewatch	KOR	1.3 km	MPC · JPL
295665	2008 TG_{55}	—	October 2, 2008	Kitt Peak	Spacewatch	·	1.5 km	MPC · JPL
295666	2008 TA_{59}	—	October 2, 2008	Kitt Peak	Spacewatch	·	2.5 km	MPC · JPL
295667	2008 TG_{60}	—	October 2, 2008	Mount Lemmon	Mount Lemmon Survey	·	3.3 km	MPC · JPL
295668	2008 TT_{63}	—	October 2, 2008	Kitt Peak	Spacewatch	·	1.9 km	MPC · JPL
295669	2008 TD_{68}	—	October 2, 2008	Kitt Peak	Spacewatch	·	700 m	MPC · JPL
295670	2008 TP_{78}	—	October 2, 2008	Mount Lemmon	Mount Lemmon Survey	·	1.9 km	MPC · JPL
295671	2008 TH_{81}	—	October 2, 2008	Mount Lemmon	Mount Lemmon Survey	·	2.1 km	MPC · JPL
295672	2008 TO_{82}	—	October 3, 2008	La Sagra	OAM	·	2.5 km	MPC · JPL
295673	2008 TK_{85}	—	October 3, 2008	Mount Lemmon	Mount Lemmon Survey	·	820 m	MPC · JPL
295674	2008 TS_{87}	—	October 3, 2008	Kitt Peak	Spacewatch	·	740 m	MPC · JPL
295675	2008 TF_{91}	—	October 3, 2008	La Sagra	OAM	L4	10 km	MPC · JPL
295676	2008 TQ_{92}	—	October 4, 2008	La Sagra	OAM	L4	9.6 km	MPC · JPL
295677	2008 TH_{94}	—	October 5, 2008	La Sagra	OAM	·	1.5 km	MPC · JPL
295678	2008 TV_{94}	—	October 5, 2008	La Sagra	OAM	·	1.1 km	MPC · JPL
295679	2008 TA_{99}	—	October 6, 2008	Kitt Peak	Spacewatch	THM	2.4 km	MPC · JPL
295680	2008 TS_{99}	—	October 6, 2008	Kitt Peak	Spacewatch	·	940 m	MPC · JPL
295681	2008 TD_{101}	—	October 6, 2008	Kitt Peak	Spacewatch	L4	9.0 km	MPC · JPL
295682	2008 TE_{111}	—	October 6, 2008	Catalina	CSS	·	3.2 km	MPC · JPL
295683	2008 TP_{111}	—	October 6, 2008	Catalina	CSS	MRX	1.3 km	MPC · JPL
295684	2008 TW_{111}	—	October 6, 2008	Catalina	CSS	·	1.2 km	MPC · JPL
295685	2008 TX_{118}	—	October 7, 2008	Kitt Peak	Spacewatch	·	1.9 km	MPC · JPL
295686	2008 TA_{119}	—	October 7, 2008	Kitt Peak	Spacewatch	L4	13 km	MPC · JPL
295687	2008 TX_{126}	—	October 8, 2008	Kitt Peak	Spacewatch	·	750 m	MPC · JPL
295688	2008 TO_{128}	—	October 8, 2008	Catalina	CSS	THM	2.5 km	MPC · JPL
295689	2008 TC_{137}	—	October 8, 2008	Kitt Peak	Spacewatch	KOR	1.5 km	MPC · JPL
295690	2008 TP_{138}	—	October 8, 2008	Mount Lemmon	Mount Lemmon Survey	·	800 m	MPC · JPL
295691	2008 TM_{144}	—	October 9, 2008	Mount Lemmon	Mount Lemmon Survey	PHO	1.1 km	MPC · JPL
295692	2008 TW_{150}	—	October 9, 2008	Mount Lemmon	Mount Lemmon Survey	·	2.2 km	MPC · JPL
295693	2008 TJ_{158}	—	October 8, 2008	Siding Spring	SSS	·	4.1 km	MPC · JPL
295694	2008 TW_{161}	—	October 8, 2008	Kitt Peak	Spacewatch	·	770 m	MPC · JPL
295695	2008 TC_{166}	—	October 6, 2008	Mount Lemmon	Mount Lemmon Survey	·	850 m	MPC · JPL
295696	2008 TW_{167}	—	October 10, 2008	Kitt Peak	Spacewatch	·	2.1 km	MPC · JPL
295697	2008 TD_{169}	—	October 6, 2008	Kitt Peak	Spacewatch	·	3.7 km	MPC · JPL
295698	2008 TN_{171}	—	October 3, 2008	Mount Lemmon	Mount Lemmon Survey	KOR	1.9 km	MPC · JPL
295699	2008 TC_{173}	—	October 1, 2008	Mount Lemmon	Mount Lemmon Survey	L4	8.5 km	MPC · JPL
295700	2008 TQ_{174}	—	October 6, 2008	Mount Lemmon	Mount Lemmon Survey	·	640 m	MPC · JPL

== 295701–295800 ==
back to top

Designation			Discovery			Properties		Ref
Permanent	Provisional	Named after	Date	Site	Discoverer(s)	Category	Diam.	Ref
295701	2008 TW_{174}	—	October 8, 2008	Kitt Peak	Spacewatch	L4	16 km	MPC · JPL
295702	2008 TS_{183}	—	October 2, 2008	Kitt Peak	Spacewatch	·	3.1 km	MPC · JPL
295703	2008 TQ_{185}	—	October 6, 2008	Mount Lemmon	Mount Lemmon Survey	·	1.7 km	MPC · JPL
295704	2008 TZ_{189}	—	October 10, 2008	Mount Lemmon	Mount Lemmon Survey	·	2.0 km	MPC · JPL
295705	2008 TB_{190}	—	October 1, 2008	Mount Lemmon	Mount Lemmon Survey	·	2.5 km	MPC · JPL
295706	2008 UG_{3}	—	October 24, 2008	Mount Lemmon	Mount Lemmon Survey	·	3.1 km	MPC · JPL
295707	2008 UA_{10}	—	October 17, 2008	Kitt Peak	Spacewatch	·	1.6 km	MPC · JPL
295708	2008 UC_{11}	—	October 17, 2008	Kitt Peak	Spacewatch	·	920 m	MPC · JPL
295709	2008 UY_{12}	—	October 17, 2008	Kitt Peak	Spacewatch	·	1.2 km	MPC · JPL
295710	2008 UM_{15}	—	October 18, 2008	Kitt Peak	Spacewatch	L4	8.6 km	MPC · JPL
295711	2008 UV_{26}	—	October 20, 2008	Kitt Peak	Spacewatch	MAS	700 m	MPC · JPL
295712	2008 UG_{28}	—	October 20, 2008	Kitt Peak	Spacewatch	·	1.5 km	MPC · JPL
295713	2008 UT_{29}	—	October 20, 2008	Kitt Peak	Spacewatch	(2076)	950 m	MPC · JPL
295714	2008 UN_{33}	—	October 20, 2008	Mount Lemmon	Mount Lemmon Survey	·	1.8 km	MPC · JPL
295715	2008 UM_{34}	—	October 20, 2008	Kitt Peak	Spacewatch	HOF	3.2 km	MPC · JPL
295716	2008 UP_{35}	—	October 20, 2008	Mount Lemmon	Mount Lemmon Survey	·	2.2 km	MPC · JPL
295717	2008 UY_{37}	—	October 20, 2008	Kitt Peak	Spacewatch	·	2.7 km	MPC · JPL
295718	2008 UN_{38}	—	October 20, 2008	Kitt Peak	Spacewatch	·	780 m	MPC · JPL
295719	2008 UD_{40}	—	October 20, 2008	Kitt Peak	Spacewatch	3:2 · SHU	4.4 km	MPC · JPL
295720	2008 UT_{42}	—	October 20, 2008	Kitt Peak	Spacewatch	T_{j} (2.99) · 3:2	4.9 km	MPC · JPL
295721	2008 UZ_{42}	—	October 20, 2008	Kitt Peak	Spacewatch	·	1.8 km	MPC · JPL
295722	2008 UU_{47}	—	October 20, 2008	Kitt Peak	Spacewatch	·	2.2 km	MPC · JPL
295723	2008 UR_{51}	—	October 20, 2008	Kitt Peak	Spacewatch	·	1.6 km	MPC · JPL
295724	2008 UD_{53}	—	October 20, 2008	Mount Lemmon	Mount Lemmon Survey	·	2.1 km	MPC · JPL
295725	2008 UE_{54}	—	October 20, 2008	Kitt Peak	Spacewatch	·	2.1 km	MPC · JPL
295726	2008 UE_{58}	—	October 21, 2008	Kitt Peak	Spacewatch	·	850 m	MPC · JPL
295727	2008 UF_{60}	—	October 21, 2008	Kitt Peak	Spacewatch	·	920 m	MPC · JPL
295728	2008 UQ_{60}	—	October 21, 2008	Kitt Peak	Spacewatch	·	1.0 km	MPC · JPL
295729	2008 UG_{61}	—	October 21, 2008	Kitt Peak	Spacewatch	·	2.4 km	MPC · JPL
295730	2008 UD_{62}	—	October 21, 2008	Kitt Peak	Spacewatch	·	2.0 km	MPC · JPL
295731	2008 UO_{62}	—	October 21, 2008	Kitt Peak	Spacewatch	·	2.2 km	MPC · JPL
295732	2008 UP_{64}	—	October 21, 2008	Mount Lemmon	Mount Lemmon Survey	·	4.0 km	MPC · JPL
295733	2008 UW_{65}	—	October 21, 2008	Kitt Peak	Spacewatch	·	1.2 km	MPC · JPL
295734	2008 UE_{66}	—	October 21, 2008	Kitt Peak	Spacewatch	·	1.9 km	MPC · JPL
295735	2008 UY_{71}	—	October 21, 2008	Kitt Peak	Spacewatch	·	1.2 km	MPC · JPL
295736	2008 UD_{73}	—	October 21, 2008	Kitt Peak	Spacewatch	·	1.5 km	MPC · JPL
295737	2008 UW_{79}	—	October 22, 2008	Kitt Peak	Spacewatch	·	1.2 km	MPC · JPL
295738	2008 UT_{83}	—	October 22, 2008	Mount Lemmon	Mount Lemmon Survey	·	2.9 km	MPC · JPL
295739	2008 UM_{86}	—	October 23, 2008	Kitt Peak	Spacewatch	THM	2.3 km	MPC · JPL
295740	2008 UL_{88}	—	October 24, 2008	Mount Lemmon	Mount Lemmon Survey	·	600 m	MPC · JPL
295741	2008 UJ_{94}	—	October 26, 2008	Socorro	LINEAR	slow	940 m	MPC · JPL
295742	2008 UF_{95}	—	October 25, 2008	Wildberg	R. Apitzsch	(5)	1.4 km	MPC · JPL
295743	2008 UK_{96}	—	October 24, 2008	Socorro	LINEAR	·	3.0 km	MPC · JPL
295744	2008 UC_{98}	—	October 26, 2008	Socorro	LINEAR	EUP	4.7 km	MPC · JPL
295745	2008 UH_{98}	—	October 26, 2008	Socorro	LINEAR	·	840 m	MPC · JPL
295746	2008 UN_{100}	—	October 30, 2008	Cordell-Lorenz	D. T. Durig	L4	17 km	MPC · JPL
295747	2008 UR_{113}	—	October 22, 2008	Kitt Peak	Spacewatch	·	1.7 km	MPC · JPL
295748	2008 UL_{114}	—	October 22, 2008	Kitt Peak	Spacewatch	·	4.1 km	MPC · JPL
295749	2008 UZ_{115}	—	October 22, 2008	Kitt Peak	Spacewatch	V	900 m	MPC · JPL
295750	2008 UN_{116}	—	October 22, 2008	Kitt Peak	Spacewatch	·	4.4 km	MPC · JPL
295751	2008 UW_{117}	—	October 22, 2008	Kitt Peak	Spacewatch	·	1.2 km	MPC · JPL
295752	2008 UP_{119}	—	December 30, 2005	Kitt Peak	Spacewatch	·	1.3 km	MPC · JPL
295753	2008 UY_{129}	—	October 23, 2008	Kitt Peak	Spacewatch	·	910 m	MPC · JPL
295754	2008 UM_{131}	—	October 23, 2008	Kitt Peak	Spacewatch	·	940 m	MPC · JPL
295755	2008 UQ_{138}	—	October 23, 2008	Kitt Peak	Spacewatch	·	750 m	MPC · JPL
295756	2008 UD_{144}	—	October 23, 2008	Kitt Peak	Spacewatch	·	1.8 km	MPC · JPL
295757	2008 UT_{146}	—	October 23, 2008	Kitt Peak	Spacewatch	·	1.5 km	MPC · JPL
295758	2008 UM_{147}	—	October 23, 2008	Kitt Peak	Spacewatch	·	1.2 km	MPC · JPL
295759	2008 UO_{151}	—	October 23, 2008	Kitt Peak	Spacewatch	·	3.3 km	MPC · JPL
295760	2008 UZ_{152}	—	October 23, 2008	Mount Lemmon	Mount Lemmon Survey	·	1.6 km	MPC · JPL
295761	2008 UL_{155}	—	October 23, 2008	Mount Lemmon	Mount Lemmon Survey	V	900 m	MPC · JPL
295762	2008 UN_{156}	—	October 23, 2008	Kitt Peak	Spacewatch	·	1.7 km	MPC · JPL
295763	2008 UQ_{158}	—	October 23, 2008	Kitt Peak	Spacewatch	·	840 m	MPC · JPL
295764	2008 UB_{160}	—	October 23, 2008	Kitt Peak	Spacewatch	·	2.3 km	MPC · JPL
295765	2008 UK_{163}	—	October 24, 2008	Kitt Peak	Spacewatch	·	1.9 km	MPC · JPL
295766	2008 UF_{164}	—	October 24, 2008	Kitt Peak	Spacewatch	·	1.3 km	MPC · JPL
295767	2008 UK_{170}	—	October 24, 2008	Catalina	CSS	·	1.9 km	MPC · JPL
295768	2008 UT_{171}	—	October 24, 2008	Kitt Peak	Spacewatch	·	3.4 km	MPC · JPL
295769	2008 UV_{180}	—	October 24, 2008	Kitt Peak	Spacewatch	·	1.8 km	MPC · JPL
295770	2008 UL_{181}	—	October 24, 2008	Mount Lemmon	Mount Lemmon Survey	·	1.8 km	MPC · JPL
295771	2008 UD_{187}	—	October 24, 2008	Kitt Peak	Spacewatch	·	1.8 km	MPC · JPL
295772	2008 UG_{187}	—	October 24, 2008	Kitt Peak	Spacewatch	·	1.4 km	MPC · JPL
295773	2008 UR_{198}	—	October 26, 2008	Socorro	LINEAR	·	1.9 km	MPC · JPL
295774	2008 US_{200}	—	October 27, 2008	Socorro	LINEAR	NYS	1.3 km	MPC · JPL
295775	2008 UO_{201}	—	October 28, 2008	Socorro	LINEAR	·	800 m	MPC · JPL
295776	2008 UY_{203}	—	October 28, 2008	Socorro	LINEAR	·	2.2 km	MPC · JPL
295777	2008 UL_{204}	—	October 28, 2008	Socorro	LINEAR	H	700 m	MPC · JPL
295778	2008 UZ_{207}	—	October 23, 2008	Kitt Peak	Spacewatch	·	1.0 km	MPC · JPL
295779	2008 UH_{208}	—	October 23, 2008	Kitt Peak	Spacewatch	·	1.6 km	MPC · JPL
295780	2008 UG_{213}	—	October 24, 2008	Catalina	CSS	·	1.1 km	MPC · JPL
295781	2008 UQ_{216}	—	October 25, 2008	Kitt Peak	Spacewatch	·	2.3 km	MPC · JPL
295782	2008 UD_{225}	—	October 25, 2008	Kitt Peak	Spacewatch	MRX	980 m	MPC · JPL
295783	2008 UN_{225}	—	October 25, 2008	Kitt Peak	Spacewatch	·	2.0 km	MPC · JPL
295784	2008 UB_{227}	—	October 25, 2008	Kitt Peak	Spacewatch	·	1.8 km	MPC · JPL
295785	2008 UE_{228}	—	October 25, 2008	Kitt Peak	Spacewatch	·	1.8 km	MPC · JPL
295786	2008 UG_{229}	—	October 25, 2008	Kitt Peak	Spacewatch	·	1.6 km	MPC · JPL
295787	2008 UT_{229}	—	October 25, 2008	Kitt Peak	Spacewatch	·	2.9 km	MPC · JPL
295788	2008 UY_{231}	—	October 26, 2008	Kitt Peak	Spacewatch	·	770 m	MPC · JPL
295789	2008 US_{248}	—	October 26, 2008	Kitt Peak	Spacewatch	·	4.3 km	MPC · JPL
295790	2008 UP_{255}	—	September 6, 2004	Ottmarsheim	C. Rinner	·	1.1 km	MPC · JPL
295791	2008 UF_{258}	—	October 27, 2008	Kitt Peak	Spacewatch	·	7.0 km	MPC · JPL
295792	2008 UP_{258}	—	October 27, 2008	Kitt Peak	Spacewatch	·	760 m	MPC · JPL
295793	2008 UG_{268}	—	October 28, 2008	Kitt Peak	Spacewatch	·	1.0 km	MPC · JPL
295794	2008 UH_{269}	—	October 28, 2008	Kitt Peak	Spacewatch	NYS	1.4 km	MPC · JPL
295795	2008 UA_{272}	—	October 28, 2008	Kitt Peak	Spacewatch	·	2.1 km	MPC · JPL
295796	2008 UV_{273}	—	October 28, 2008	Kitt Peak	Spacewatch	·	730 m	MPC · JPL
295797	2008 UR_{276}	—	October 28, 2008	Mount Lemmon	Mount Lemmon Survey	·	960 m	MPC · JPL
295798	2008 UL_{277}	—	October 28, 2008	Mount Lemmon	Mount Lemmon Survey	NYS	1.1 km	MPC · JPL
295799	2008 UY_{279}	—	October 28, 2008	Mount Lemmon	Mount Lemmon Survey	·	740 m	MPC · JPL
295800	2008 UR_{286}	—	October 28, 2008	Mount Lemmon	Mount Lemmon Survey	·	2.0 km	MPC · JPL

== 295801–295900 ==
back to top

Designation			Discovery			Properties		Ref
Permanent	Provisional	Named after	Date	Site	Discoverer(s)	Category	Diam.	Ref
295801	2008 UC_{291}	—	October 28, 2008	Kitt Peak	Spacewatch	·	1.9 km	MPC · JPL
295802	2008 UY_{291}	—	October 29, 2008	Kitt Peak	Spacewatch	·	790 m	MPC · JPL
295803	2008 UQ_{294}	—	October 29, 2008	Kitt Peak	Spacewatch	·	4.1 km	MPC · JPL
295804	2008 UE_{303}	—	October 29, 2008	Kitt Peak	Spacewatch	NYS	1.9 km	MPC · JPL
295805	2008 UK_{305}	—	October 30, 2008	Kitt Peak	Spacewatch	·	1.3 km	MPC · JPL
295806	2008 UW_{306}	—	October 30, 2008	Kitt Peak	Spacewatch	·	1.4 km	MPC · JPL
295807	2008 UA_{307}	—	October 30, 2008	Catalina	CSS	EOS	2.3 km	MPC · JPL
295808	2008 UH_{313}	—	October 30, 2008	Catalina	CSS	V	920 m	MPC · JPL
295809	2008 UX_{316}	—	October 30, 2008	Mount Lemmon	Mount Lemmon Survey	MAS	860 m	MPC · JPL
295810	2008 UB_{317}	—	October 30, 2008	Kitt Peak	Spacewatch	·	2.7 km	MPC · JPL
295811	2008 UM_{321}	—	October 31, 2008	Mount Lemmon	Mount Lemmon Survey	(2076)	1.6 km	MPC · JPL
295812	2008 UW_{324}	—	October 31, 2008	Mount Lemmon	Mount Lemmon Survey	·	2.8 km	MPC · JPL
295813	2008 UX_{326}	—	October 31, 2008	Mount Lemmon	Mount Lemmon Survey	(5)	1.8 km	MPC · JPL
295814	2008 US_{328}	—	October 30, 2008	Mount Lemmon	Mount Lemmon Survey	·	1.1 km	MPC · JPL
295815	2008 UE_{330}	—	October 31, 2008	Kitt Peak	Spacewatch	·	3.6 km	MPC · JPL
295816	2008 UV_{331}	—	October 31, 2008	Mount Lemmon	Mount Lemmon Survey	·	2.4 km	MPC · JPL
295817	2008 US_{335}	—	October 20, 2008	Kitt Peak	Spacewatch	·	1.4 km	MPC · JPL
295818	2008 UX_{335}	—	October 20, 2008	Kitt Peak	Spacewatch	·	1.3 km	MPC · JPL
295819	2008 UF_{336}	—	October 20, 2008	Kitt Peak	Spacewatch	NEM	2.3 km	MPC · JPL
295820	2008 UE_{337}	—	October 20, 2008	Kitt Peak	Spacewatch	·	1.6 km	MPC · JPL
295821	2008 UN_{338}	—	October 21, 2008	Kitt Peak	Spacewatch	·	1.2 km	MPC · JPL
295822	2008 UJ_{344}	—	October 30, 2008	Catalina	CSS	T_{j} (2.97) · EUP	7.1 km	MPC · JPL
295823	2008 UU_{344}	—	October 30, 2008	Kitt Peak	Spacewatch	·	2.9 km	MPC · JPL
295824	2008 UX_{346}	—	October 24, 2008	Mount Lemmon	Mount Lemmon Survey	·	3.1 km	MPC · JPL
295825	2008 UY_{348}	—	October 26, 2008	Kitt Peak	Spacewatch	·	850 m	MPC · JPL
295826	2008 UG_{349}	—	October 27, 2008	Mount Lemmon	Mount Lemmon Survey	MAS	1.0 km	MPC · JPL
295827	2008 UX_{351}	—	October 24, 2008	Catalina	CSS	EUN	1.6 km	MPC · JPL
295828	2008 UA_{353}	—	October 20, 2008	Kitt Peak	Spacewatch	MRX	1.2 km	MPC · JPL
295829	2008 UR_{355}	—	October 26, 2008	Mount Lemmon	Mount Lemmon Survey	·	1.3 km	MPC · JPL
295830	2008 UK_{360}	—	October 21, 2008	Kitt Peak	Spacewatch	·	1.7 km	MPC · JPL
295831	2008 UK_{367}	—	October 24, 2008	Socorro	LINEAR	·	3.6 km	MPC · JPL
295832	2008 UO_{370}	—	October 28, 2008	Kitt Peak	Spacewatch	·	1.5 km	MPC · JPL
295833	2008 UT_{370}	—	October 30, 2008	Kitt Peak	Spacewatch	·	2.5 km	MPC · JPL
295834	2008 VC_{1}	—	November 1, 2008	Kitami	K. Endate	·	3.3 km	MPC · JPL
295835	2008 VO_{1}	—	November 2, 2008	Socorro	LINEAR	·	2.7 km	MPC · JPL
295836	2008 VX_{1}	—	November 2, 2008	Socorro	LINEAR	·	810 m	MPC · JPL
295837	2008 VC_{3}	—	November 3, 2008	Socorro	LINEAR	·	2.8 km	MPC · JPL
295838	2008 VS_{6}	—	November 1, 2008	Mount Lemmon	Mount Lemmon Survey	·	1.2 km	MPC · JPL
295839	2008 VB_{10}	—	November 2, 2008	Vail-Jarnac	Jarnac	·	2.2 km	MPC · JPL
295840	2008 VA_{12}	—	November 2, 2008	Mount Lemmon	Mount Lemmon Survey	·	1.2 km	MPC · JPL
295841 Gorbulin	2008 VT_{13}	Gorbulin	November 7, 2008	Andrushivka	Andrushivka	·	2.7 km	MPC · JPL
295842	2008 VN_{14}	—	November 7, 2008	Andrushivka	Andrushivka	·	970 m	MPC · JPL
295843	2008 VX_{29}	—	November 2, 2008	Mount Lemmon	Mount Lemmon Survey	·	2.3 km	MPC · JPL
295844	2008 VH_{39}	—	November 2, 2008	Catalina	CSS	MAR	1.7 km	MPC · JPL
295845	2008 VO_{39}	—	January 7, 2006	Mount Lemmon	Mount Lemmon Survey	·	1.6 km	MPC · JPL
295846	2008 VY_{39}	—	November 2, 2008	Kitt Peak	Spacewatch	·	2.7 km	MPC · JPL
295847	2008 VB_{40}	—	November 3, 2008	Mount Lemmon	Mount Lemmon Survey	·	910 m	MPC · JPL
295848	2008 VX_{51}	—	November 6, 2008	Kitt Peak	Spacewatch	·	1.4 km	MPC · JPL
295849	2008 VS_{54}	—	November 6, 2008	Mount Lemmon	Mount Lemmon Survey	·	3.2 km	MPC · JPL
295850	2008 VB_{56}	—	November 6, 2008	Mount Lemmon	Mount Lemmon Survey	·	3.4 km	MPC · JPL
295851	2008 VJ_{59}	—	November 7, 2008	Catalina	CSS	·	740 m	MPC · JPL
295852	2008 VA_{62}	—	November 8, 2008	Kitt Peak	Spacewatch	NYS	1.3 km	MPC · JPL
295853	2008 VG_{67}	—	November 7, 2008	Mount Lemmon	Mount Lemmon Survey	·	850 m	MPC · JPL
295854	2008 VX_{67}	—	November 6, 2008	Mount Lemmon	Mount Lemmon Survey	·	3.8 km	MPC · JPL
295855	2008 VA_{68}	—	November 9, 2008	Kitt Peak	Spacewatch	MAS	840 m	MPC · JPL
295856	2008 VR_{69}	—	November 8, 2008	Kitt Peak	Spacewatch	·	710 m	MPC · JPL
295857	2008 VM_{74}	—	November 8, 2008	Kitt Peak	Spacewatch	·	2.2 km	MPC · JPL
295858	2008 VO_{77}	—	November 3, 2008	Mount Lemmon	Mount Lemmon Survey	AGN	1.3 km	MPC · JPL
295859	2008 VR_{78}	—	November 7, 2008	Mount Lemmon	Mount Lemmon Survey	·	1.5 km	MPC · JPL
295860	2008 VF_{80}	—	November 8, 2008	Catalina	CSS	(10369)	4.6 km	MPC · JPL
295861	2008 VL_{80}	—	November 1, 2008	Mount Lemmon	Mount Lemmon Survey	·	6.3 km	MPC · JPL
295862	2008 WB_{1}	—	November 17, 2008	Kitt Peak	Spacewatch	·	1.0 km	MPC · JPL
295863	2008 WA_{4}	—	November 17, 2008	Kitt Peak	Spacewatch	·	670 m	MPC · JPL
295864	2008 WM_{5}	—	November 17, 2008	Kitt Peak	Spacewatch	·	1.6 km	MPC · JPL
295865	2008 WJ_{11}	—	November 18, 2008	Catalina	CSS	·	1.2 km	MPC · JPL
295866	2008 WS_{11}	—	November 18, 2008	Catalina	CSS	·	2.4 km	MPC · JPL
295867	2008 WP_{13}	—	November 19, 2008	Dauban	Kugel, F.	·	1.2 km	MPC · JPL
295868	2008 WK_{16}	—	November 17, 2008	Kitt Peak	Spacewatch	KOR	1.4 km	MPC · JPL
295869	2008 WN_{22}	—	November 18, 2008	Kitt Peak	Spacewatch	·	1.8 km	MPC · JPL
295870	2008 WR_{24}	—	November 18, 2008	Catalina	CSS	·	850 m	MPC · JPL
295871	2008 WJ_{27}	—	November 19, 2008	Mount Lemmon	Mount Lemmon Survey	·	1.4 km	MPC · JPL
295872	2008 WM_{29}	—	November 19, 2008	Kitt Peak	Spacewatch	·	2.0 km	MPC · JPL
295873	2008 WG_{32}	—	November 19, 2008	Mount Lemmon	Mount Lemmon Survey	NYS	1.4 km	MPC · JPL
295874	2008 WT_{32}	—	November 20, 2008	Goodricke-Pigott	R. A. Tucker	·	2.4 km	MPC · JPL
295875	2008 WL_{38}	—	November 17, 2008	Kitt Peak	Spacewatch	·	2.7 km	MPC · JPL
295876	2008 WE_{40}	—	November 17, 2008	Kitt Peak	Spacewatch	·	870 m	MPC · JPL
295877	2008 WF_{42}	—	November 17, 2008	Kitt Peak	Spacewatch	·	1.7 km	MPC · JPL
295878	2008 WB_{44}	—	November 17, 2008	Kitt Peak	Spacewatch	·	1.7 km	MPC · JPL
295879	2008 WP_{47}	—	November 17, 2008	Kitt Peak	Spacewatch	MAS	830 m	MPC · JPL
295880	2008 WR_{47}	—	November 17, 2008	Kitt Peak	Spacewatch	THM	2.0 km	MPC · JPL
295881	2008 WX_{49}	—	November 18, 2008	Catalina	CSS	·	690 m	MPC · JPL
295882	2008 WK_{56}	—	November 20, 2008	Mount Lemmon	Mount Lemmon Survey	MAS	800 m	MPC · JPL
295883	2008 WV_{59}	—	November 18, 2008	Socorro	LINEAR	·	3.2 km	MPC · JPL
295884	2008 WE_{62}	—	November 23, 2008	La Sagra	OAM	·	830 m	MPC · JPL
295885	2008 WX_{65}	—	November 17, 2008	Kitt Peak	Spacewatch	·	2.2 km	MPC · JPL
295886	2008 WD_{67}	—	November 18, 2008	Kitt Peak	Spacewatch	3:2	4.8 km	MPC · JPL
295887	2008 WJ_{67}	—	November 18, 2008	Kitt Peak	Spacewatch	·	2.3 km	MPC · JPL
295888	2008 WM_{68}	—	November 18, 2008	Kitt Peak	Spacewatch	·	1.3 km	MPC · JPL
295889	2008 WO_{70}	—	November 18, 2008	Kitt Peak	Spacewatch	HOF	4.6 km	MPC · JPL
295890	2008 WW_{71}	—	November 19, 2008	Kitt Peak	Spacewatch	·	2.4 km	MPC · JPL
295891	2008 WD_{74}	—	November 19, 2008	Mount Lemmon	Mount Lemmon Survey	·	1.0 km	MPC · JPL
295892	2008 WS_{74}	—	November 20, 2008	Kitt Peak	Spacewatch	AST	1.7 km	MPC · JPL
295893	2008 WM_{75}	—	November 20, 2008	Mount Lemmon	Mount Lemmon Survey	·	5.0 km	MPC · JPL
295894	2008 WZ_{76}	—	November 20, 2008	Kitt Peak	Spacewatch	·	4.5 km	MPC · JPL
295895	2008 WT_{78}	—	November 20, 2008	Kitt Peak	Spacewatch	·	1.5 km	MPC · JPL
295896	2008 WO_{81}	—	November 20, 2008	Kitt Peak	Spacewatch	·	880 m	MPC · JPL
295897	2008 WH_{83}	—	November 20, 2008	Kitt Peak	Spacewatch	·	2.3 km	MPC · JPL
295898	2008 WT_{83}	—	November 20, 2008	Kitt Peak	Spacewatch	·	1.4 km	MPC · JPL
295899	2008 WG_{85}	—	November 20, 2008	Kitt Peak	Spacewatch	·	2.7 km	MPC · JPL
295900	2008 WY_{85}	—	November 20, 2008	Kitt Peak	Spacewatch	·	1.7 km	MPC · JPL

== 295901–296000 ==
back to top

Designation			Discovery			Properties		Ref
Permanent	Provisional	Named after	Date	Site	Discoverer(s)	Category	Diam.	Ref
295901	2008 WT_{86}	—	November 21, 2008	Kitt Peak	Spacewatch	·	1.8 km	MPC · JPL
295902	2008 WB_{87}	—	November 21, 2008	Kitt Peak	Spacewatch	V	860 m	MPC · JPL
295903	2008 WO_{90}	—	November 22, 2008	Mount Lemmon	Mount Lemmon Survey	HYG	3.5 km	MPC · JPL
295904	2008 WP_{92}	—	November 25, 2008	Dauban	Kugel, F.	L4	10 km	MPC · JPL
295905	2008 WB_{93}	—	November 26, 2008	La Sagra	OAM	·	3.9 km	MPC · JPL
295906	2008 WB_{94}	—	November 24, 2008	Sierra Stars	Dillon, W. G., Wells, D.	THM	2.4 km	MPC · JPL
295907	2008 WK_{94}	—	November 27, 2008	Pla D'Arguines	R. Ferrando	·	950 m	MPC · JPL
295908	2008 WN_{96}	—	November 30, 2008	Plana	Fratev, F.	·	760 m	MPC · JPL
295909	2008 WE_{100}	—	November 24, 2008	Mount Lemmon	Mount Lemmon Survey	·	1.4 km	MPC · JPL
295910	2008 WN_{100}	—	November 24, 2008	Mount Lemmon	Mount Lemmon Survey	·	750 m	MPC · JPL
295911	2008 WN_{102}	—	November 19, 2008	Catalina	CSS	T_{j} (2.96)	7.1 km	MPC · JPL
295912	2008 WZ_{105}	—	November 30, 2008	Kitt Peak	Spacewatch	V	880 m	MPC · JPL
295913	2008 WM_{106}	—	September 16, 2003	Kitt Peak	Spacewatch	·	2.4 km	MPC · JPL
295914	2008 WD_{110}	—	November 30, 2008	Kitt Peak	Spacewatch	·	1.5 km	MPC · JPL
295915	2008 WN_{113}	—	November 30, 2008	Kitt Peak	Spacewatch	·	1.6 km	MPC · JPL
295916	2008 WX_{126}	—	November 18, 2008	Kitt Peak	Spacewatch	MAS	950 m	MPC · JPL
295917	2008 WZ_{126}	—	November 30, 2008	Mount Lemmon	Mount Lemmon Survey	·	1.2 km	MPC · JPL
295918	2008 WQ_{128}	—	November 19, 2008	Kitt Peak	Spacewatch	HYG	2.9 km	MPC · JPL
295919	2008 WL_{130}	—	November 22, 2008	Kitt Peak	Spacewatch	·	1.7 km	MPC · JPL
295920	2008 WQ_{133}	—	November 18, 2008	Catalina	CSS	EOS	3.0 km	MPC · JPL
295921	2008 WH_{134}	—	November 21, 2008	Mount Lemmon	Mount Lemmon Survey	·	2.5 km	MPC · JPL
295922	2008 WH_{135}	—	November 18, 2008	Kitt Peak	Spacewatch	·	1.6 km	MPC · JPL
295923	2008 WP_{135}	—	November 18, 2008	Kitt Peak	Spacewatch	(5)	1.8 km	MPC · JPL
295924	2008 WL_{136}	—	November 20, 2008	Kitt Peak	Spacewatch	·	2.4 km	MPC · JPL
295925	2008 WS_{137}	—	November 23, 2008	Kitt Peak	Spacewatch	·	1.6 km	MPC · JPL
295926	2008 WV_{137}	—	November 24, 2008	Socorro	LINEAR	·	3.1 km	MPC · JPL
295927	2008 WZ_{137}	—	November 30, 2008	Socorro	LINEAR	·	4.0 km	MPC · JPL
295928	2008 WM_{138}	—	September 22, 2003	Palomar	NEAT	MAR	1.9 km	MPC · JPL
295929	2008 XF_{2}	—	December 1, 2008	Bisei SG Center	BATTeRS	·	2.5 km	MPC · JPL
295930	2008 XQ_{4}	—	December 3, 2008	Socorro	LINEAR	·	4.4 km	MPC · JPL
295931	2008 XE_{5}	—	December 7, 2008	Dauban	Kugel, F.	·	4.4 km	MPC · JPL
295932	2008 XU_{5}	—	December 4, 2008	Socorro	LINEAR	·	1.2 km	MPC · JPL
295933	2008 XB_{6}	—	December 4, 2008	Socorro	LINEAR	EOS	2.7 km	MPC · JPL
295934	2008 XY_{6}	—	December 7, 2008	Marly	P. Kocher	HNS	1.7 km	MPC · JPL
295935 Majia	2008 XD_{7}	Majia	December 15, 2008	Weihai	University, Shandong	·	1.0 km	MPC · JPL
295936	2008 XD_{11}	—	December 1, 2008	Catalina	CSS	·	2.0 km	MPC · JPL
295937	2008 XT_{13}	—	December 3, 2008	Mount Lemmon	Mount Lemmon Survey	·	3.0 km	MPC · JPL
295938	2008 XH_{14}	—	December 1, 2008	Kitt Peak	Spacewatch	·	1.9 km	MPC · JPL
295939	2008 XJ_{14}	—	December 1, 2008	Kitt Peak	Spacewatch	NYS	1.2 km	MPC · JPL
295940	2008 XF_{17}	—	October 17, 2003	Apache Point	SDSS	·	1.6 km	MPC · JPL
295941	2008 XR_{20}	—	December 1, 2008	Kitt Peak	Spacewatch	·	2.3 km	MPC · JPL
295942	2008 XD_{25}	—	December 4, 2008	Mount Lemmon	Mount Lemmon Survey	·	3.6 km	MPC · JPL
295943	2008 XN_{30}	—	December 1, 2008	Kitt Peak	Spacewatch	·	5.3 km	MPC · JPL
295944	2008 XF_{38}	—	December 2, 2008	Kitt Peak	Spacewatch	·	1.4 km	MPC · JPL
295945	2008 XL_{45}	—	December 3, 2008	Kitt Peak	Spacewatch	·	3.6 km	MPC · JPL
295946	2008 XM_{45}	—	December 3, 2008	Kitt Peak	Spacewatch	EOS	3.6 km	MPC · JPL
295947	2008 XL_{48}	—	December 4, 2008	Mount Lemmon	Mount Lemmon Survey	·	1.1 km	MPC · JPL
295948	2008 XS_{48}	—	December 4, 2008	Catalina	CSS	·	3.2 km	MPC · JPL
295949	2008 XB_{49}	—	December 5, 2008	Mount Lemmon	Mount Lemmon Survey	V	910 m	MPC · JPL
295950	2008 XG_{50}	—	December 3, 2008	Mount Lemmon	Mount Lemmon Survey	·	1.5 km	MPC · JPL
295951	2008 XM_{53}	—	December 6, 2008	Socorro	LINEAR	EOS	3.0 km	MPC · JPL
295952	2008 XD_{54}	—	December 1, 2008	Socorro	LINEAR	·	1.4 km	MPC · JPL
295953	2008 XG_{55}	—	December 1, 2008	Mount Lemmon	Mount Lemmon Survey	·	2.4 km	MPC · JPL
295954	2008 XJ_{55}	—	December 3, 2008	Mount Lemmon	Mount Lemmon Survey	EOS	2.5 km	MPC · JPL
295955	2008 XL_{55}	—	December 7, 2008	Mount Lemmon	Mount Lemmon Survey	NYS	1.3 km	MPC · JPL
295956	2008 YV_{2}	—	December 22, 2008	Mayhill	Lowe, A.	·	1.4 km	MPC · JPL
295957	2008 YB_{4}	—	December 22, 2008	Calar Alto	F. Hormuth	EOS	2.3 km	MPC · JPL
295958	2008 YK_{4}	—	December 22, 2008	Dauban	Kugel, F.	V	800 m	MPC · JPL
295959	2008 YD_{10}	—	December 20, 2008	Catalina	CSS	TIR	4.3 km	MPC · JPL
295960	2008 YF_{19}	—	December 21, 2008	Mount Lemmon	Mount Lemmon Survey	·	2.0 km	MPC · JPL
295961	2008 YJ_{19}	—	December 21, 2008	Mount Lemmon	Mount Lemmon Survey	·	2.0 km	MPC · JPL
295962	2008 YD_{20}	—	December 21, 2008	Mount Lemmon	Mount Lemmon Survey	·	1.6 km	MPC · JPL
295963	2008 YH_{20}	—	December 21, 2008	Mount Lemmon	Mount Lemmon Survey	·	1.3 km	MPC · JPL
295964	2008 YX_{20}	—	December 21, 2008	Mount Lemmon	Mount Lemmon Survey	HYG	3.1 km	MPC · JPL
295965	2008 YM_{22}	—	December 21, 2008	Mount Lemmon	Mount Lemmon Survey	ERI	2.1 km	MPC · JPL
295966	2008 YV_{23}	—	December 21, 2008	La Sagra	OAM	·	5.7 km	MPC · JPL
295967	2008 YF_{25}	—	December 21, 2008	Kitt Peak	Spacewatch	·	1.2 km	MPC · JPL
295968	2008 YO_{25}	—	December 24, 2008	La Sagra	OAM	PHO	1.6 km	MPC · JPL
295969	2008 YV_{26}	—	December 28, 2008	Mayhill	Lowe, A.	NYS	1.5 km	MPC · JPL
295970	2008 YR_{28}	—	December 28, 2008	Piszkéstető	K. Sárneczky	·	1.1 km	MPC · JPL
295971	2008 YV_{28}	—	December 29, 2008	Piszkéstető	K. Sárneczky	·	1.6 km	MPC · JPL
295972	2008 YJ_{32}	—	December 29, 2008	Piszkéstető	K. Sárneczky	·	1.9 km	MPC · JPL
295973	2008 YF_{33}	—	December 24, 2008	Dauban	Kugel, F.	·	1.1 km	MPC · JPL
295974	2008 YL_{35}	—	December 22, 2008	Kitt Peak	Spacewatch	PHO	1.3 km	MPC · JPL
295975	2008 YO_{35}	—	December 22, 2008	Kitt Peak	Spacewatch	·	3.7 km	MPC · JPL
295976	2008 YC_{36}	—	December 29, 2008	Mount Lemmon	Mount Lemmon Survey	·	1.7 km	MPC · JPL
295977	2008 YX_{38}	—	December 29, 2008	Kitt Peak	Spacewatch	·	1.8 km	MPC · JPL
295978	2008 YR_{40}	—	December 29, 2008	Mount Lemmon	Mount Lemmon Survey	·	2.3 km	MPC · JPL
295979	2008 YX_{42}	—	December 29, 2008	Kitt Peak	Spacewatch	HOF	3.0 km	MPC · JPL
295980	2008 YA_{43}	—	December 29, 2008	Kitt Peak	Spacewatch	HOF	3.2 km	MPC · JPL
295981	2008 YV_{48}	—	December 29, 2008	Mount Lemmon	Mount Lemmon Survey	·	1.9 km	MPC · JPL
295982	2008 YY_{52}	—	December 29, 2008	Mount Lemmon	Mount Lemmon Survey	·	3.0 km	MPC · JPL
295983	2008 YD_{58}	—	December 30, 2008	Kitt Peak	Spacewatch	·	2.8 km	MPC · JPL
295984	2008 YB_{59}	—	December 30, 2008	Kitt Peak	Spacewatch	·	2.0 km	MPC · JPL
295985	2008 YS_{60}	—	November 21, 2000	Socorro	LINEAR	·	1.8 km	MPC · JPL
295986	2008 YJ_{62}	—	December 30, 2008	Mount Lemmon	Mount Lemmon Survey	·	3.8 km	MPC · JPL
295987	2008 YA_{66}	—	December 29, 2008	Taunus	E. Schwab, R. Kling	·	1.9 km	MPC · JPL
295988	2008 YC_{68}	—	December 30, 2008	Mount Lemmon	Mount Lemmon Survey	EOS	1.8 km	MPC · JPL
295989	2008 YG_{68}	—	December 30, 2008	Mount Lemmon	Mount Lemmon Survey	·	1.9 km	MPC · JPL
295990	2008 YO_{73}	—	December 30, 2008	Kitt Peak	Spacewatch	·	2.0 km	MPC · JPL
295991	2008 YF_{79}	—	December 30, 2008	Mount Lemmon	Mount Lemmon Survey	·	2.3 km	MPC · JPL
295992	2008 YR_{87}	—	December 29, 2008	Kitt Peak	Spacewatch	·	3.8 km	MPC · JPL
295993	2008 YY_{89}	—	December 29, 2008	Kitt Peak	Spacewatch	·	970 m	MPC · JPL
295994	2008 YA_{92}	—	December 29, 2008	Kitt Peak	Spacewatch	·	1.8 km	MPC · JPL
295995	2008 YV_{93}	—	December 29, 2008	Kitt Peak	Spacewatch	·	990 m	MPC · JPL
295996	2008 YQ_{94}	—	December 29, 2008	Kitt Peak	Spacewatch	·	2.0 km	MPC · JPL
295997	2008 YR_{94}	—	December 29, 2008	Kitt Peak	Spacewatch	EOS	2.5 km	MPC · JPL
295998	2008 YM_{95}	—	December 29, 2008	Kitt Peak	Spacewatch	·	2.2 km	MPC · JPL
295999	2008 YY_{95}	—	December 29, 2008	Kitt Peak	Spacewatch	·	2.7 km	MPC · JPL
296000	2008 YF_{96}	—	December 29, 2008	Mount Lemmon	Mount Lemmon Survey	NYS	960 m	MPC · JPL

back to top

== See also ==
- Meanings of minor-planet names: 295001–296000
