= Meanings of minor-planet names: 296001–297000 =

As minor planet discoveries are confirmed, they are given a permanent number by the IAU's Minor Planet Center (MPC), and the discoverers can then submit names for them, following the IAU's naming conventions. The list below concerns those minor planets in the specified number-range that have received names, and explains the meanings of those names.

Official naming citations of newly named small Solar System bodies are approved and published in a bulletin by IAU's Working Group for Small Bodies Nomenclature (WGSBN). Before May 2021, citations were published in MPC's Minor Planet Circulars for many decades. Recent citations can also be found on the JPL Small-Body Database (SBDB). Until his death in 2016, German astronomer Lutz D. Schmadel compiled these citations into the Dictionary of Minor Planet Names (DMP) and regularly updated the collection.

Based on Paul Herget's The Names of the Minor Planets, Schmadel also researched the unclear origin of numerous asteroids, most of which had been named prior to World War II. This article incorporates text from this source, which is in the public domain: SBDB New namings may only be added to this list below after official publication as the preannouncement of names is condemned. The WGSBN publishes a comprehensive guideline for the naming rules of non-cometary small Solar System bodies.

== 296001–296100 ==
Named minor planet	Provisional	This minor planet was named for...	Ref · Catalog
There are no named minor planets in this number range

== 296101–296200 ==
back to top

Named minor planet	Provisional	This minor planet was named for...	Ref · Catalog
There are no named minor planets in this number range

== 296201–296300 ==
back to top

Named minor planet	Provisional	This minor planet was named for...	Ref · Catalog
There are no named minor planets in this number range

== 296301–296400 ==
back to top

Named minor planet	Provisional	This minor planet was named for...	Ref · Catalog
296351 Linyongbin	2009 FZ_{18}	Lin Yong-Bin (born 1968), a Chinese meteorite hunter and member of the Xinjiang Astronomical Society, who frequently visits the Gobi Desert.	IAU · 296351

== 296401–296500 ==
back to top

Named minor planet	Provisional	This minor planet was named for...	Ref · Catalog
296446 Gregorstadler	2009 HZ_{81}	Gregor Stadler, Austrian mathematician and physicist and dedicated teacher at the Gymnasium Schärding.	IAU · 296446
296462 Corylachlan	2009 HZ_{81}	Cory Lachlan Todd (born 1997), son of Australian astronomer Michael Todd who discovered this minor planet	JPL · 296462

== 296501–296600 ==
back to top

Named minor planet	Provisional	This minor planet was named for...	Ref · Catalog
296525 Milanovskiy	2009 OU_{2}	Aleksandr Evgen'evich Milanovskiy (1950–2004), a famous Russian geologist and meteorite searcher and investigator.	JPL · 296525
296577 Arkhangelsk	2009 RV_{2}	Arkhangelsk, city and first Russian seaport founded in 1584, on the banks of the Northern Dvina River near the White Sea	JPL · 296577
296587 Ocaña	2009 RA_{26}	Francisco Ocaña, Spanish astronomer.	IAU · 296587

== 296601–296700 ==
back to top

Named minor planet	Provisional	This minor planet was named for...	Ref · Catalog
296638 Sergeibelov	2009 SD_{101}	Sergei Belov (1944–2013), a Soviet basketball player, considered to be one of the best European basketball players of all time	JPL · 296638

== 296701–296800 ==
back to top

Named minor planet	Provisional	This minor planet was named for...	Ref · Catalog
296753 Mustafamahmoud	2009 UP_{14}	Mustafa Mahmoud born Mustafa Kamal Mahmoud Husayn (1921–2009), an Egyptian scientist and a prolific author	JPL · 296753

== 296801–296900 ==
back to top

Named minor planet	Provisional	This minor planet was named for...	Ref · Catalog
296819 Artesian	2009 WY_{6}	The Artesian archaeological expedition (AAE) was formed in 1987 and organized by Moscow State Pedagogical University on the territory of the Bosporan Kingdom in eastern Crimea. The research included archaeoastronomy and discovered several ancient astronomical observatories (Src).	JPL · 296819
296820 Paju	2009 WT_{7}	PAJU is the nickname of a very popular show on French-speaking Swiss television. Passe-moi les jumelles talks about nature in all its states: the earth, the sea, the sky and the cosmos.	IAU · 296820

== 296901–297000 ==
back to top

Named minor planet	Provisional	This minor planet was named for...	Ref · Catalog
296905 Korochantsev	2010 CJ_{36}	Vladimir Alexeevich Korochantsev (born 1934), a Russian journalist, publicist and writer	JPL · 296905
296907 Alexander	2010 CA_{52}	Claudia Alexander (1959–2015), an American planetary scientist who served as the project manager for the Galileo mission to Jupiter and the U.S. project scientist for the Rosetta mission.	JPL · 296907
296928 Francescopalla	2010 CE_{155}	Francesco Palla (1954–2016) was an Italian astronomer, known for his contributions to the field of star formation. He was Director of the Arcetri Astrophysical Observatory from 2005 to 2011, and author of more than 300 scientific papers. Palla coauthored, with Steve Stahler, the textbook The Formation of Stars.	JPL · 296928
296930 McLaren	2010 CB_{181}	Robert A. McLaren (b. 1946), a Canadian astronomer.	IAU · 296930
296945 Ronaldlaub	2010 DD_{78}	Ronald L. Laub (b. 1937), an American astronomer.	IAU · 296945
296950 Robertbauer	2010 EJ_{19}	A. Robert Bauer Sr., MD (1897–1984) successfully combined oxygen, heat, humidity and ease of nursing care in 1931 to create the first modern neonatal intensive care unit-grade incubator. Roughly one in eight infants are born prematurely, and many of them have benefited from Bauer's invention.	JPL · 296950
296968 Ignatianum	2010 ES_{74}	Ignatianum is the Jesuit University of Philosophy and Education in Kraków, Poland	JPL · 296968
296987 Piotrflin	2010 ET_{119}	Piotr Flin (born 1945), a Polish astronomer and a professor at Jan Kochanowski University in Kielce, Poland	JPL · 296987

back to top

Preceded by 295,001–296,000	Meanings of minor-planet names List of minor planets: 296,001–297,000	Succeeded by 297,001–298,000
