= Meanings of minor-planet names: 293001–294000 =

As minor planet discoveries are confirmed, they are given a permanent number by the IAU's Minor Planet Center (MPC), and the discoverers can then submit names for them, following the IAU's naming conventions. The list below concerns those minor planets in the specified number-range that have received names, and explains the meanings of those names.

Official naming citations of newly named small Solar System bodies are approved and published in a bulletin by IAU's Working Group for Small Bodies Nomenclature (WGSBN). Before May 2021, citations were published in MPC's Minor Planet Circulars for many decades. Recent citations can also be found on the JPL Small-Body Database (SBDB). Until his death in 2016, German astronomer Lutz D. Schmadel compiled these citations into the Dictionary of Minor Planet Names (DMP) and regularly updated the collection.

Based on Paul Herget's The Names of the Minor Planets, Schmadel also researched the unclear origin of numerous asteroids, most of which had been named prior to World War II. This article incorporates text from this source, which is in the public domain: SBDB New namings may only be added to this list below after official publication as the preannouncement of names is condemned. The WGSBN publishes a comprehensive guideline for the naming rules of non-cometary small Solar System bodies.

== 293001–293100 ==
Named minor planet	Provisional	This minor planet was named for...	Ref · Catalog
There are no named minor planets in this number range

== 293101–293200 ==
back to top

Named minor planet	Provisional	This minor planet was named for...	Ref · Catalog
293131 Meteora	2006 XV_{56}	The Meteora is a UNESCO World Heritage Site and a formation of immense monolithic pillars in central Greece. Hill-like huge rounded boulders dominate the local area and six monasteries are built on the natural conglomerate pillars.	IAU · 293131

== 293201–293300 ==
back to top

Named minor planet	Provisional	This minor planet was named for...	Ref · Catalog
There are no named minor planets in this number range

== 293301–293400 ==
back to top

Named minor planet	Provisional	This minor planet was named for...	Ref · Catalog
293366 Roux	2007 EQ_{9}	Pierre Paul Émile Roux (1853–1933), a French bacteriologist, close collaborator of Louis Pasteur, and co-founder of the Pasteur Institute	JPL · 293366
293383 Maigret	2007 EZ_{38}	Jules Maigret, also known as "Commissaire Maigret", a fictional character created by writer Georges Simenon in 1931. Maigret is a French police detective and Commissaire a la Brigade Criminelle de Paris.	JPL · 293383

== 293401–293500 ==
back to top

Named minor planet	Provisional	This minor planet was named for...	Ref · Catalog
293477 Teotihuacan	2007 FY	Teotihuacan is an ancient Mesoamerican city located in a sub-valley of the Valley of Mexico. Apart from the pyramids, Teotihuacan is also anthropologically significant for its complex, multi-family residential avenue of the dead; and the small portion of its vibrant murals that have been exceptionally well-preserved.	JPL · 293477
293499 Wolinski	2007 GP_{5}	Georges Wolinski (1934–2015), a French cartoonist	JPL · 293499

== 293501–293600 ==
back to top

Named minor planet	Provisional	This minor planet was named for...	Ref · Catalog
There are no named minor planets in this number range

== 293601–293700 ==
back to top

Named minor planet	Provisional	This minor planet was named for...	Ref · Catalog
There are no named minor planets in this number range

== 293701–293800 ==
back to top

Named minor planet	Provisional	This minor planet was named for...	Ref · Catalog
293707 Govoradloanatoly	2007 QT_{1}	Anatoliy Vasylyovych Govoradlo (born 1960), a physicist by education, who is also known as a Ukrainian poet and composer.	JPL · 293707
293787 Mucunbo	2007 RB_{134}	Hiroshi Kimura, known as Mucunbo, was a Japanese astronomer who worked at the Purple Mountain Observatory for 25 years.	IAU · 293787

== 293801–293900 ==
back to top

Named minor planet	Provisional	This minor planet was named for...	Ref · Catalog
293809 Zugspitze	2007 RD_{162}	Zugspitze, located in the Alps, the highest mountain (2962 m) in Germany.	JPL · 293809
293878 Tapping	2007 RV_{274}	Kenneth Tapping (born 1945), a solar physicist at the NRC-Dominion Radio Astrophysical Observatory.	JPL · 293878

== 293901–294000 ==
back to top

Named minor planet	Provisional	This minor planet was named for...	Ref · Catalog
293909 Matterhorn	2007 SS_{2}	The Matterhorn (Monte Cervino; Mont Cervin), a remarkably shaped mountain in the Alps on the border between Switzerland and Italy	JPL · 293909
293926 Harrystine	2007 TJ_{1}	G. Harry Stine (1928–1997), one of the founding figures of model rocketry (hobby of spacemodeling) in the 1950s, enjoyed by millions of enthusiasts today. He also founded the National Association of Rocketry.	JPL · 293926
293934 MPIA	2007 TM_{8}	The Max Planck Institute for Astronomy, abbreviated MPIA, at Heidelberg in Germany	JPL · 293934
293985 Franquin	2007 TF_{69}	André Franquin (1924–1997), a Belgian comics artist, producer of the Spirou and Fantasio strip, and creator of the characters Gaston Lagaffe and Marsupilami	JPL · 293985

back to top

Preceded by 292,001–293,000	Meanings of minor-planet names List of minor planets: 293,001–294,000	Succeeded by 294,001–295,000
