= List of minor planets: 293001–294000 =

The following is a partial list of minor planets, running from minor-planet number 293001 through 294000, inclusive. The primary data for this and other partial lists is based on JPL's "Small-Body Orbital Elements" and data available from the Minor Planet Center. Critical list information is also provided by the MPC, unless otherwise specified from Lowell Observatory. A detailed description of the table's columns and additional sources are given on the main page including a complete list of every page in this series, and a statistical break-up on the dynamical classification of minor planets.

Also see the summary list of all named bodies in numerical and alphabetical order, and the corresponding naming citations for the number range of this particular list. New namings may only be added to this list after official publication, as the preannouncement of names is condemned by the Working Group for Small Bodies Nomenclature of the International Astronomical Union.

Near-Earth obj.	MBA (inner)	MBA (outer)	Centaur
Mars-crosser	MBA (middle)	Jupiter trojan	Trans-Neptunian obj.
Unclassified

== 293001–293100 ==
Designation			Discovery			Properties		Ref
Permanent	Provisional	Named after	Date	Site	Discoverer(s)	Category	Diam.	Ref
293001	2006 WF_{20}	—	November 17, 2006	Mount Lemmon	Mount Lemmon Survey	·	2.3 km	MPC · JPL
293002	2006 WS_{20}	—	November 17, 2006	Mount Lemmon	Mount Lemmon Survey	·	1.9 km	MPC · JPL
293003	2006 WR_{21}	—	November 17, 2006	Mount Lemmon	Mount Lemmon Survey	·	1.9 km	MPC · JPL
293004	2006 WO_{24}	—	November 17, 2006	Mount Lemmon	Mount Lemmon Survey	·	1.4 km	MPC · JPL
293005	2006 WT_{26}	—	November 18, 2006	Catalina	CSS	·	3.3 km	MPC · JPL
293006	2006 WU_{27}	—	November 22, 2006	7300	W. K. Y. Yeung	·	840 m	MPC · JPL
293007	2006 WD_{35}	—	November 16, 2006	Kitt Peak	Spacewatch	·	980 m	MPC · JPL
293008	2006 WW_{35}	—	November 16, 2006	Kitt Peak	Spacewatch	·	2.6 km	MPC · JPL
293009	2006 WT_{36}	—	November 16, 2006	Kitt Peak	Spacewatch	·	1.7 km	MPC · JPL
293010	2006 WD_{37}	—	November 16, 2006	Kitt Peak	Spacewatch	·	6.0 km	MPC · JPL
293011	2006 WV_{37}	—	November 16, 2006	Kitt Peak	Spacewatch	·	1.8 km	MPC · JPL
293012	2006 WE_{38}	—	November 16, 2006	Kitt Peak	Spacewatch	·	1.9 km	MPC · JPL
293013	2006 WF_{43}	—	November 16, 2006	Mount Lemmon	Mount Lemmon Survey	·	1.0 km	MPC · JPL
293014	2006 WR_{43}	—	November 16, 2006	Mount Lemmon	Mount Lemmon Survey	·	1.8 km	MPC · JPL
293015	2006 WN_{44}	—	November 16, 2006	Kitt Peak	Spacewatch	·	6.2 km	MPC · JPL
293016	2006 WK_{48}	—	November 16, 2006	Kitt Peak	Spacewatch	·	1.3 km	MPC · JPL
293017	2006 WJ_{50}	—	November 16, 2006	Mount Lemmon	Mount Lemmon Survey	·	5.0 km	MPC · JPL
293018	2006 WX_{51}	—	November 16, 2006	Mount Lemmon	Mount Lemmon Survey	(11882)	1.7 km	MPC · JPL
293019	2006 WC_{54}	—	November 16, 2006	Kitt Peak	Spacewatch	·	1.6 km	MPC · JPL
293020	2006 WV_{54}	—	November 16, 2006	Kitt Peak	Spacewatch	·	1.7 km	MPC · JPL
293021	2006 WL_{55}	—	November 16, 2006	Kitt Peak	Spacewatch	·	2.3 km	MPC · JPL
293022	2006 WB_{58}	—	November 17, 2006	Kitt Peak	Spacewatch	EOS	3.0 km	MPC · JPL
293023	2006 WQ_{58}	—	November 17, 2006	Kitt Peak	Spacewatch	·	1.7 km	MPC · JPL
293024	2006 WS_{59}	—	November 17, 2006	Mount Lemmon	Mount Lemmon Survey	MRX	1.2 km	MPC · JPL
293025	2006 WG_{61}	—	November 17, 2006	Mount Lemmon	Mount Lemmon Survey	·	1.8 km	MPC · JPL
293026	2006 WD_{62}	—	November 17, 2006	Kitt Peak	Spacewatch	·	4.2 km	MPC · JPL
293027	2006 WM_{62}	—	November 17, 2006	Mount Lemmon	Mount Lemmon Survey	·	3.2 km	MPC · JPL
293028	2006 WP_{69}	—	November 17, 2006	Mount Lemmon	Mount Lemmon Survey	·	2.6 km	MPC · JPL
293029	2006 WV_{69}	—	November 18, 2006	Kitt Peak	Spacewatch	·	2.5 km	MPC · JPL
293030	2006 WM_{74}	—	November 18, 2006	Kitt Peak	Spacewatch	HOF	2.6 km	MPC · JPL
293031	2006 WC_{75}	—	November 18, 2006	Kitt Peak	Spacewatch	TIR	2.7 km	MPC · JPL
293032	2006 WC_{76}	—	November 18, 2006	Kitt Peak	Spacewatch	THM	2.6 km	MPC · JPL
293033	2006 WF_{81}	—	November 18, 2006	Kitt Peak	Spacewatch	NYS	1.4 km	MPC · JPL
293034	2006 WF_{85}	—	November 18, 2006	Kitt Peak	Spacewatch	·	2.7 km	MPC · JPL
293035	2006 WC_{87}	—	November 18, 2006	Socorro	LINEAR	H	950 m	MPC · JPL
293036	2006 WD_{87}	—	November 18, 2006	Socorro	LINEAR	·	4.4 km	MPC · JPL
293037	2006 WY_{87}	—	November 18, 2006	Mount Lemmon	Mount Lemmon Survey	·	660 m	MPC · JPL
293038	2006 WF_{89}	—	November 18, 2006	Kitt Peak	Spacewatch	VER	4.6 km	MPC · JPL
293039	2006 WB_{94}	—	November 19, 2006	Kitt Peak	Spacewatch	·	1.5 km	MPC · JPL
293040	2006 WE_{95}	—	November 19, 2006	Kitt Peak	Spacewatch	·	2.0 km	MPC · JPL
293041	2006 WL_{97}	—	November 19, 2006	Kitt Peak	Spacewatch	·	1.7 km	MPC · JPL
293042	2006 WD_{98}	—	November 19, 2006	Kitt Peak	Spacewatch	HYG	3.6 km	MPC · JPL
293043	2006 WU_{99}	—	November 19, 2006	Kitt Peak	Spacewatch	·	1.3 km	MPC · JPL
293044	2006 WA_{100}	—	November 19, 2006	Catalina	CSS	·	1.2 km	MPC · JPL
293045	2006 WG_{100}	—	November 19, 2006	Catalina	CSS	·	1.8 km	MPC · JPL
293046	2006 WV_{100}	—	November 19, 2006	Socorro	LINEAR	·	2.3 km	MPC · JPL
293047	2006 WK_{102}	—	November 19, 2006	Kitt Peak	Spacewatch	·	1.2 km	MPC · JPL
293048	2006 WN_{103}	—	November 19, 2006	Kitt Peak	Spacewatch	THM	2.5 km	MPC · JPL
293049	2006 WT_{106}	—	November 19, 2006	Catalina	CSS	·	1.4 km	MPC · JPL
293050	2006 WJ_{108}	—	November 19, 2006	Kitt Peak	Spacewatch	EOS	2.6 km	MPC · JPL
293051	2006 WW_{109}	—	November 19, 2006	Kitt Peak	Spacewatch	·	1.6 km	MPC · JPL
293052	2006 WQ_{114}	—	November 20, 2006	Kitt Peak	Spacewatch	·	1.7 km	MPC · JPL
293053	2006 WN_{124}	—	November 22, 2006	Mount Lemmon	Mount Lemmon Survey	·	2.5 km	MPC · JPL
293054	2006 WP_{127}	—	November 25, 2006	Mount Lemmon	Mount Lemmon Survey	T_{j} (2.94) · APO	720 m	MPC · JPL
293055	2006 WG_{128}	—	November 24, 2006	Mount Nyukasa	Japan Aerospace Exploration Agency	(5)	1.3 km	MPC · JPL
293056	2006 WZ_{130}	—	November 18, 2006	Catalina	CSS	·	2.0 km	MPC · JPL
293057	2006 WD_{133}	—	November 18, 2006	Kitt Peak	Spacewatch	·	1.6 km	MPC · JPL
293058	2006 WZ_{144}	—	November 20, 2006	Kitt Peak	Spacewatch	HOF	2.5 km	MPC · JPL
293059	2006 WB_{147}	—	November 20, 2006	Kitt Peak	Spacewatch	EOS	2.6 km	MPC · JPL
293060	2006 WD_{149}	—	November 20, 2006	Kitt Peak	Spacewatch	·	1.1 km	MPC · JPL
293061	2006 WN_{149}	—	November 20, 2006	Kitt Peak	Spacewatch	MAR	1.5 km	MPC · JPL
293062	2006 WE_{151}	—	November 21, 2006	Mount Lemmon	Mount Lemmon Survey	·	1 km	MPC · JPL
293063	2006 WL_{153}	—	November 21, 2006	Mount Lemmon	Mount Lemmon Survey	·	890 m	MPC · JPL
293064	2006 WT_{153}	—	November 22, 2006	Kitt Peak	Spacewatch	·	2.4 km	MPC · JPL
293065	2006 WS_{156}	—	November 22, 2006	Mount Lemmon	Mount Lemmon Survey	·	1.4 km	MPC · JPL
293066	2006 WP_{157}	—	November 22, 2006	Catalina	CSS	·	2.6 km	MPC · JPL
293067	2006 WC_{159}	—	November 22, 2006	Kitt Peak	Spacewatch	KOR	1.9 km	MPC · JPL
293068	2006 WE_{159}	—	November 22, 2006	Kitt Peak	Spacewatch	MAS	680 m	MPC · JPL
293069	2006 WW_{166}	—	November 23, 2006	Kitt Peak	Spacewatch	·	1.8 km	MPC · JPL
293070	2006 WJ_{167}	—	November 23, 2006	Kitt Peak	Spacewatch	·	3.3 km	MPC · JPL
293071	2006 WL_{167}	—	November 23, 2006	Kitt Peak	Spacewatch	·	4.8 km	MPC · JPL
293072	2006 WA_{171}	—	November 23, 2006	Kitt Peak	Spacewatch	·	1.4 km	MPC · JPL
293073	2006 WC_{171}	—	November 23, 2006	Kitt Peak	Spacewatch	ADE	3.8 km	MPC · JPL
293074	2006 WB_{173}	—	November 23, 2006	Kitt Peak	Spacewatch	·	2.1 km	MPC · JPL
293075	2006 WO_{174}	—	November 23, 2006	Kitt Peak	Spacewatch	·	3.1 km	MPC · JPL
293076	2006 WP_{174}	—	November 23, 2006	Kitt Peak	Spacewatch	·	2.2 km	MPC · JPL
293077	2006 WZ_{175}	—	November 23, 2006	Kitt Peak	Spacewatch	·	1.5 km	MPC · JPL
293078	2006 WV_{176}	—	November 23, 2006	Mount Lemmon	Mount Lemmon Survey	V	740 m	MPC · JPL
293079	2006 WF_{180}	—	November 24, 2006	Mount Lemmon	Mount Lemmon Survey	·	1.7 km	MPC · JPL
293080	2006 WR_{181}	—	November 24, 2006	Mount Lemmon	Mount Lemmon Survey	MAS	780 m	MPC · JPL
293081	2006 WR_{182}	—	November 24, 2006	Kitt Peak	Spacewatch	·	2.3 km	MPC · JPL
293082	2006 WP_{183}	—	November 25, 2006	Mount Lemmon	Mount Lemmon Survey	·	2.9 km	MPC · JPL
293083	2006 WV_{188}	—	November 24, 2006	Kitt Peak	Spacewatch	·	1.7 km	MPC · JPL
293084	2006 WS_{190}	—	November 25, 2006	Kitt Peak	Spacewatch	·	1.8 km	MPC · JPL
293085	2006 WD_{191}	—	November 27, 2006	Kitt Peak	Spacewatch	·	3.6 km	MPC · JPL
293086	2006 WU_{191}	—	November 27, 2006	Kitt Peak	Spacewatch	V	890 m	MPC · JPL
293087	2006 WZ_{193}	—	November 27, 2006	Kitt Peak	Spacewatch	·	3.0 km	MPC · JPL
293088	2006 WT_{194}	—	November 28, 2006	Kitt Peak	Spacewatch	·	4.2 km	MPC · JPL
293089	2006 WK_{195}	—	November 30, 2006	Kitt Peak	Spacewatch	(5)	1.4 km	MPC · JPL
293090	2006 WD_{198}	—	November 22, 2006	Mount Lemmon	Mount Lemmon Survey	·	1.4 km	MPC · JPL
293091	2006 WK_{200}	—	November 19, 2006	Kitt Peak	Spacewatch	·	1.9 km	MPC · JPL
293092	2006 WS_{201}	—	November 22, 2006	Mount Lemmon	Mount Lemmon Survey	·	2.4 km	MPC · JPL
293093	2006 WF_{202}	—	November 22, 2006	Kitt Peak	Spacewatch	NEM	2.7 km	MPC · JPL
293094	2006 WT_{202}	—	November 27, 2006	Kitt Peak	Spacewatch	·	2.5 km	MPC · JPL
293095	2006 XV_{3}	—	December 13, 2006	Socorro	LINEAR	H	820 m	MPC · JPL
293096	2006 XX_{3}	—	December 14, 2006	Socorro	LINEAR	H	740 m	MPC · JPL
293097	2006 XE_{12}	—	December 10, 2006	Kitt Peak	Spacewatch	·	6.9 km	MPC · JPL
293098	2006 XH_{12}	—	December 10, 2006	Kitt Peak	Spacewatch	(21885)	4.5 km	MPC · JPL
293099	2006 XN_{12}	—	December 10, 2006	Kitt Peak	Spacewatch	·	1.7 km	MPC · JPL
293100	2006 XZ_{14}	—	December 10, 2006	Kitt Peak	Spacewatch	MAS	740 m	MPC · JPL

== 293101–293200 ==
back to top

Designation			Discovery			Properties		Ref
Permanent	Provisional	Named after	Date	Site	Discoverer(s)	Category	Diam.	Ref
293101	2006 XZ_{15}	—	December 10, 2006	Kitt Peak	Spacewatch	·	2.5 km	MPC · JPL
293102	2006 XU_{16}	—	December 10, 2006	Kitt Peak	Spacewatch	·	4.2 km	MPC · JPL
293103	2006 XS_{17}	—	December 10, 2006	Kitt Peak	Spacewatch	·	2.5 km	MPC · JPL
293104	2006 XY_{17}	—	December 10, 2006	Kitt Peak	Spacewatch	·	1.8 km	MPC · JPL
293105	2006 XF_{19}	—	December 11, 2006	Kitt Peak	Spacewatch	(5)	1.6 km	MPC · JPL
293106	2006 XN_{21}	—	December 12, 2006	Kitt Peak	Spacewatch	·	950 m	MPC · JPL
293107	2006 XT_{21}	—	December 12, 2006	Kitt Peak	Spacewatch	EUN	1.8 km	MPC · JPL
293108	2006 XC_{22}	—	December 12, 2006	Kitt Peak	Spacewatch	KOR	1.7 km	MPC · JPL
293109	2006 XL_{22}	—	December 12, 2006	Kitt Peak	Spacewatch	·	1.7 km	MPC · JPL
293110	2006 XO_{25}	—	December 12, 2006	Mount Lemmon	Mount Lemmon Survey	NEM	3.1 km	MPC · JPL
293111	2006 XH_{26}	—	December 12, 2006	Catalina	CSS	·	1.8 km	MPC · JPL
293112	2006 XH_{27}	—	December 13, 2006	Kitt Peak	Spacewatch	·	1.7 km	MPC · JPL
293113	2006 XA_{29}	—	December 13, 2006	Mount Lemmon	Mount Lemmon Survey	·	3.9 km	MPC · JPL
293114	2006 XH_{29}	—	December 13, 2006	Mount Lemmon	Mount Lemmon Survey	KOR	1.3 km	MPC · JPL
293115	2006 XJ_{29}	—	December 13, 2006	Mount Lemmon	Mount Lemmon Survey	·	1.8 km	MPC · JPL
293116	2006 XS_{33}	—	December 11, 2006	Kitt Peak	Spacewatch	·	2.2 km	MPC · JPL
293117	2006 XK_{35}	—	December 11, 2006	Kitt Peak	Spacewatch	·	1.6 km	MPC · JPL
293118	2006 XR_{35}	—	December 11, 2006	Kitt Peak	Spacewatch	THM	2.6 km	MPC · JPL
293119	2006 XB_{36}	—	December 11, 2006	Catalina	CSS	·	2.9 km	MPC · JPL
293120	2006 XF_{36}	—	December 11, 2006	Kitt Peak	Spacewatch	·	1.8 km	MPC · JPL
293121	2006 XT_{36}	—	December 11, 2006	Kitt Peak	Spacewatch	EOS	2.6 km	MPC · JPL
293122	2006 XV_{44}	—	December 13, 2006	Kitt Peak	Spacewatch	KOR	1.6 km	MPC · JPL
293123	2006 XC_{45}	—	December 13, 2006	Kitt Peak	Spacewatch	THM	2.1 km	MPC · JPL
293124	2006 XZ_{45}	—	December 13, 2006	Socorro	LINEAR	·	1.3 km	MPC · JPL
293125	2006 XE_{48}	—	December 13, 2006	Socorro	LINEAR	·	6.3 km	MPC · JPL
293126	2006 XD_{49}	—	December 13, 2006	Mount Lemmon	Mount Lemmon Survey	·	2.5 km	MPC · JPL
293127	2006 XW_{52}	—	December 14, 2006	Socorro	LINEAR	·	2.4 km	MPC · JPL
293128	2006 XO_{54}	—	December 15, 2006	Kitt Peak	Spacewatch	·	2.6 km	MPC · JPL
293129	2006 XC_{55}	—	December 15, 2006	Socorro	LINEAR	(1547)	2.5 km	MPC · JPL
293130	2006 XO_{56}	—	December 13, 2006	Kitt Peak	Spacewatch	NYS	1.9 km	MPC · JPL
293131 Meteora	2006 XV_{56}	Meteora	December 15, 2006	Vallemare Borbona	V. S. Casulli	·	1.4 km	MPC · JPL
293132	2006 XW_{56}	—	December 12, 2006	Catalina	CSS	·	3.1 km	MPC · JPL
293133	2006 XA_{60}	—	December 14, 2006	Kitt Peak	Spacewatch	·	2.4 km	MPC · JPL
293134	2006 XP_{61}	—	December 15, 2006	Kitt Peak	Spacewatch	·	3.4 km	MPC · JPL
293135	2006 XX_{63}	—	December 11, 2006	Socorro	LINEAR	·	3.1 km	MPC · JPL
293136	2006 XM_{64}	—	December 12, 2006	Socorro	LINEAR	·	2.0 km	MPC · JPL
293137	2006 XQ_{64}	—	December 12, 2006	Socorro	LINEAR	·	7.0 km	MPC · JPL
293138	2006 XG_{65}	—	December 12, 2006	Palomar	NEAT	·	2.7 km	MPC · JPL
293139	2006 XW_{68}	—	December 12, 2006	Palomar	NEAT	·	2.1 km	MPC · JPL
293140	2006 XZ_{68}	—	December 11, 2006	Kitt Peak	Spacewatch	·	1.5 km	MPC · JPL
293141	2006 XM_{69}	—	December 13, 2006	Kitt Peak	Spacewatch	·	2.8 km	MPC · JPL
293142	2006 XQ_{69}	—	December 15, 2006	Mount Lemmon	Mount Lemmon Survey	·	2.4 km	MPC · JPL
293143	2006 XR_{72}	—	December 13, 2006	Mount Lemmon	Mount Lemmon Survey	·	2.2 km	MPC · JPL
293144	2006 XS_{72}	—	December 13, 2006	Kitt Peak	Spacewatch	·	3.8 km	MPC · JPL
293145	2006 YP_{1}	—	December 16, 2006	Mount Lemmon	Mount Lemmon Survey	·	2.2 km	MPC · JPL
293146	2006 YR_{4}	—	December 16, 2006	Mount Lemmon	Mount Lemmon Survey	·	1.8 km	MPC · JPL
293147	2006 YK_{5}	—	December 17, 2006	Mount Lemmon	Mount Lemmon Survey	·	1.7 km	MPC · JPL
293148	2006 YS_{5}	—	December 17, 2006	Mount Lemmon	Mount Lemmon Survey	MAS	800 m	MPC · JPL
293149	2006 YT_{5}	—	December 17, 2006	Mount Lemmon	Mount Lemmon Survey	·	2.1 km	MPC · JPL
293150	2006 YG_{7}	—	December 20, 2006	Palomar	NEAT	·	1.3 km	MPC · JPL
293151	2006 YQ_{8}	—	December 20, 2006	Mount Lemmon	Mount Lemmon Survey	THM	2.3 km	MPC · JPL
293152	2006 YM_{10}	—	December 21, 2006	Anderson Mesa	LONEOS	H	880 m	MPC · JPL
293153	2006 YB_{12}	—	December 22, 2006	Črni Vrh	J. Skvarč, H. Mikuž	·	4.8 km	MPC · JPL
293154	2006 YL_{12}	—	December 20, 2006	Mount Nyukasa	Japan Aerospace Exploration Agency	·	3.0 km	MPC · JPL
293155	2006 YX_{12}	—	December 24, 2006	Gnosca	S. Sposetti	·	1.3 km	MPC · JPL
293156	2006 YK_{14}	—	December 25, 2006	Gnosca	S. Sposetti	·	1.7 km	MPC · JPL
293157	2006 YO_{15}	—	December 20, 2006	Palomar	NEAT	·	5.8 km	MPC · JPL
293158	2006 YQ_{15}	—	December 20, 2006	Palomar	NEAT	·	2.0 km	MPC · JPL
293159	2006 YW_{16}	—	December 21, 2006	Mount Lemmon	Mount Lemmon Survey	·	5.0 km	MPC · JPL
293160	2006 YU_{17}	—	December 22, 2006	Mount Lemmon	Mount Lemmon Survey	·	5.2 km	MPC · JPL
293161	2006 YL_{20}	—	December 21, 2006	Kitt Peak	Spacewatch	·	1.2 km	MPC · JPL
293162	2006 YA_{21}	—	December 21, 2006	Kitt Peak	Spacewatch	·	1.9 km	MPC · JPL
293163	2006 YP_{21}	—	December 21, 2006	Kitt Peak	Spacewatch	·	1.7 km	MPC · JPL
293164	2006 YD_{25}	—	December 21, 2006	Kitt Peak	Spacewatch	·	2.2 km	MPC · JPL
293165	2006 YZ_{26}	—	December 21, 2006	Kitt Peak	Spacewatch	MAS	690 m	MPC · JPL
293166	2006 YU_{31}	—	December 21, 2006	Kitt Peak	Spacewatch	AGN	1.4 km	MPC · JPL
293167	2006 YC_{38}	—	December 21, 2006	Kitt Peak	Spacewatch	·	1.7 km	MPC · JPL
293168	2006 YX_{41}	—	December 22, 2006	Socorro	LINEAR	·	2.8 km	MPC · JPL
293169	2006 YN_{47}	—	December 23, 2006	Mount Lemmon	Mount Lemmon Survey	·	1.9 km	MPC · JPL
293170	2006 YU_{47}	—	December 24, 2006	Catalina	CSS	·	5.1 km	MPC · JPL
293171	2006 YT_{48}	—	December 24, 2006	Kitt Peak	Spacewatch	·	1.3 km	MPC · JPL
293172	2006 YJ_{51}	—	December 24, 2006	Kitt Peak	Spacewatch	MAS	830 m	MPC · JPL
293173	2006 YN_{51}	—	December 27, 2006	Mount Lemmon	Mount Lemmon Survey	·	1.7 km	MPC · JPL
293174	2006 YY_{51}	—	December 27, 2006	Mount Lemmon	Mount Lemmon Survey	NYS	1.4 km	MPC · JPL
293175	2006 YA_{52}	—	December 27, 2006	Mount Lemmon	Mount Lemmon Survey	·	2.3 km	MPC · JPL
293176	2006 YR_{52}	—	December 16, 2006	Kitt Peak	Spacewatch	·	1.6 km	MPC · JPL
293177	2007 AE_{4}	—	January 8, 2007	Catalina	CSS	·	2.1 km	MPC · JPL
293178	2007 AV_{6}	—	January 9, 2007	Kitt Peak	Spacewatch	CYB	5.6 km	MPC · JPL
293179	2007 AP_{10}	—	January 10, 2007	Socorro	LINEAR	·	1.6 km	MPC · JPL
293180	2007 AY_{10}	—	January 9, 2007	Kitt Peak	Spacewatch	·	1.7 km	MPC · JPL
293181	2007 AW_{11}	—	January 15, 2007	Kitt Peak	Spacewatch	·	2.0 km	MPC · JPL
293182	2007 AW_{14}	—	January 10, 2007	Mount Lemmon	Mount Lemmon Survey	EOS	2.8 km	MPC · JPL
293183	2007 AZ_{14}	—	January 10, 2007	Mount Lemmon	Mount Lemmon Survey	·	1.1 km	MPC · JPL
293184	2007 AE_{17}	—	January 15, 2007	Catalina	CSS	·	5.4 km	MPC · JPL
293185	2007 AK_{19}	—	January 15, 2007	Anderson Mesa	LONEOS	·	2.8 km	MPC · JPL
293186	2007 AO_{21}	—	January 15, 2007	Catalina	CSS	·	2.2 km	MPC · JPL
293187	2007 AR_{24}	—	January 15, 2007	Catalina	CSS	·	920 m	MPC · JPL
293188	2007 AR_{25}	—	January 15, 2007	Anderson Mesa	LONEOS	EUN	1.8 km	MPC · JPL
293189	2007 AS_{25}	—	January 15, 2007	Catalina	CSS	·	2.6 km	MPC · JPL
293190	2007 AU_{28}	—	January 10, 2007	Mount Lemmon	Mount Lemmon Survey	MRX	1.1 km	MPC · JPL
293191	2007 AX_{28}	—	January 10, 2007	Mount Lemmon	Mount Lemmon Survey	·	3.9 km	MPC · JPL
293192	2007 AH_{30}	—	January 9, 2007	Mount Lemmon	Mount Lemmon Survey	·	1.3 km	MPC · JPL
293193	2007 AA_{31}	—	January 10, 2007	Mount Lemmon	Mount Lemmon Survey	·	3.4 km	MPC · JPL
293194	2007 AC_{31}	—	January 10, 2007	Mount Lemmon	Mount Lemmon Survey	MRX	1.0 km	MPC · JPL
293195	2007 BK_{2}	—	January 16, 2007	Catalina	CSS	·	4.6 km	MPC · JPL
293196	2007 BR_{5}	—	January 17, 2007	Catalina	CSS	H	780 m	MPC · JPL
293197	2007 BH_{6}	—	January 17, 2007	Palomar	NEAT	TIR	3.9 km	MPC · JPL
293198	2007 BU_{6}	—	January 17, 2007	Kitt Peak	Spacewatch	·	2.0 km	MPC · JPL
293199	2007 BF_{9}	—	January 17, 2007	Catalina	CSS	·	2.3 km	MPC · JPL
293200	2007 BO_{10}	—	January 17, 2007	Palomar	NEAT	MAS	960 m	MPC · JPL

== 293201–293300 ==
back to top

Designation			Discovery			Properties		Ref
Permanent	Provisional	Named after	Date	Site	Discoverer(s)	Category	Diam.	Ref
293201	2007 BC_{11}	—	January 17, 2007	Kitt Peak	Spacewatch	·	1.6 km	MPC · JPL
293202	2007 BC_{12}	—	January 17, 2007	Kitt Peak	Spacewatch	·	3.2 km	MPC · JPL
293203	2007 BG_{13}	—	January 17, 2007	Kitt Peak	Spacewatch	KOR	1.5 km	MPC · JPL
293204	2007 BK_{13}	—	January 17, 2007	Kitt Peak	Spacewatch	KOR	1.4 km	MPC · JPL
293205	2007 BO_{15}	—	January 17, 2007	Kitt Peak	Spacewatch	AGN	1.5 km	MPC · JPL
293206	2007 BK_{17}	—	January 17, 2007	Palomar	NEAT	fast	2.9 km	MPC · JPL
293207	2007 BX_{17}	—	January 17, 2007	Kitt Peak	Spacewatch	·	3.1 km	MPC · JPL
293208	2007 BM_{18}	—	January 17, 2007	Palomar	NEAT	·	2.1 km	MPC · JPL
293209	2007 BD_{19}	—	January 21, 2007	Socorro	LINEAR	ADE	2.5 km	MPC · JPL
293210	2007 BJ_{20}	—	January 23, 2007	Anderson Mesa	LONEOS	PHO	1.4 km	MPC · JPL
293211	2007 BX_{20}	—	January 18, 2007	Palomar	NEAT	·	3.9 km	MPC · JPL
293212	2007 BE_{22}	—	January 24, 2007	Socorro	LINEAR	·	2.7 km	MPC · JPL
293213	2007 BJ_{24}	—	January 24, 2007	Mount Lemmon	Mount Lemmon Survey	·	4.2 km	MPC · JPL
293214	2007 BJ_{25}	—	January 24, 2007	Mount Lemmon	Mount Lemmon Survey	·	2.3 km	MPC · JPL
293215	2007 BJ_{27}	—	January 24, 2007	Catalina	CSS	·	3.0 km	MPC · JPL
293216	2007 BY_{27}	—	January 24, 2007	Mount Lemmon	Mount Lemmon Survey	·	1.9 km	MPC · JPL
293217	2007 BJ_{28}	—	January 24, 2007	Mount Lemmon	Mount Lemmon Survey	(13314)	2.7 km	MPC · JPL
293218	2007 BN_{35}	—	January 24, 2007	Mount Lemmon	Mount Lemmon Survey	·	1.9 km	MPC · JPL
293219	2007 BP_{36}	—	January 24, 2007	Socorro	LINEAR	·	2.9 km	MPC · JPL
293220	2007 BS_{37}	—	January 24, 2007	Mount Lemmon	Mount Lemmon Survey	·	1.8 km	MPC · JPL
293221	2007 BK_{38}	—	January 24, 2007	Catalina	CSS	·	760 m	MPC · JPL
293222	2007 BF_{40}	—	January 24, 2007	Mount Lemmon	Mount Lemmon Survey	·	2.0 km	MPC · JPL
293223	2007 BN_{40}	—	January 24, 2007	Mount Lemmon	Mount Lemmon Survey	KOR	1.3 km	MPC · JPL
293224	2007 BH_{42}	—	January 24, 2007	Catalina	CSS	·	1.6 km	MPC · JPL
293225	2007 BA_{50}	—	January 27, 2007	Kitt Peak	Spacewatch	·	2.3 km	MPC · JPL
293226	2007 BS_{56}	—	January 24, 2007	Socorro	LINEAR	EOS	2.4 km	MPC · JPL
293227	2007 BA_{58}	—	January 24, 2007	Catalina	CSS	CYB	6.0 km	MPC · JPL
293228	2007 BM_{59}	—	January 25, 2007	Catalina	CSS	·	3.5 km	MPC · JPL
293229	2007 BS_{60}	—	January 26, 2007	Kitt Peak	Spacewatch	·	2.3 km	MPC · JPL
293230	2007 BB_{61}	—	January 27, 2007	Mount Lemmon	Mount Lemmon Survey	NEM	2.4 km	MPC · JPL
293231	2007 BS_{61}	—	January 27, 2007	Mount Lemmon	Mount Lemmon Survey	·	1.9 km	MPC · JPL
293232	2007 BB_{63}	—	January 27, 2007	Mount Lemmon	Mount Lemmon Survey	·	2.5 km	MPC · JPL
293233	2007 BM_{64}	—	January 27, 2007	Mount Lemmon	Mount Lemmon Survey	·	740 m	MPC · JPL
293234	2007 BR_{64}	—	January 27, 2007	Kitt Peak	Spacewatch	·	4.0 km	MPC · JPL
293235	2007 BR_{67}	—	January 27, 2007	Mount Lemmon	Mount Lemmon Survey	HOF	3.2 km	MPC · JPL
293236	2007 BM_{68}	—	January 27, 2007	Mount Lemmon	Mount Lemmon Survey	KOR	1.6 km	MPC · JPL
293237	2007 BQ_{69}	—	January 27, 2007	Kitt Peak	Spacewatch	·	1.3 km	MPC · JPL
293238	2007 BY_{69}	—	January 27, 2007	Mount Lemmon	Mount Lemmon Survey	·	750 m	MPC · JPL
293239	2007 BC_{71}	—	January 28, 2007	Mount Lemmon	Mount Lemmon Survey	·	1.9 km	MPC · JPL
293240	2007 BO_{74}	—	January 17, 2007	Mount Lemmon	Mount Lemmon Survey	AEO	1.2 km	MPC · JPL
293241	2007 BH_{75}	—	January 28, 2007	Mount Lemmon	Mount Lemmon Survey	·	3.4 km	MPC · JPL
293242	2007 BK_{75}	—	January 29, 2007	Kitt Peak	Spacewatch	·	1.9 km	MPC · JPL
293243	2007 BT_{77}	—	January 28, 2007	Mount Lemmon	Mount Lemmon Survey	·	4.6 km	MPC · JPL
293244	2007 BD_{78}	—	January 28, 2007	Mount Lemmon	Mount Lemmon Survey	·	1.5 km	MPC · JPL
293245	2007 BZ_{78}	—	January 27, 2007	Mount Lemmon	Mount Lemmon Survey	·	2.4 km	MPC · JPL
293246	2007 BR_{80}	—	January 17, 2007	Kitt Peak	Spacewatch	·	2.4 km	MPC · JPL
293247	2007 BF_{101}	—	January 27, 2007	Kitt Peak	Spacewatch	THM	2.9 km	MPC · JPL
293248	2007 CS_{1}	—	February 6, 2007	Kitt Peak	Spacewatch	·	3.9 km	MPC · JPL
293249	2007 CU_{1}	—	February 6, 2007	Mount Lemmon	Mount Lemmon Survey	TEL	1.9 km	MPC · JPL
293250	2007 CW_{1}	—	February 6, 2007	Kitt Peak	Spacewatch	AGN	1.7 km	MPC · JPL
293251	2007 CF_{2}	—	February 6, 2007	Kitt Peak	Spacewatch	·	1.3 km	MPC · JPL
293252	2007 CO_{3}	—	February 6, 2007	Kitt Peak	Spacewatch	AGN	1.6 km	MPC · JPL
293253	2007 CE_{9}	—	February 6, 2007	Kitt Peak	Spacewatch	·	4.2 km	MPC · JPL
293254	2007 CZ_{11}	—	February 6, 2007	Kitt Peak	Spacewatch	·	1.8 km	MPC · JPL
293255	2007 CF_{12}	—	February 6, 2007	Kitt Peak	Spacewatch	(5)	1.2 km	MPC · JPL
293256	2007 CH_{12}	—	February 6, 2007	Mount Lemmon	Mount Lemmon Survey	KOR	1.7 km	MPC · JPL
293257	2007 CK_{13}	—	February 7, 2007	Mount Lemmon	Mount Lemmon Survey	·	2.8 km	MPC · JPL
293258	2007 CO_{15}	—	February 5, 2007	Palomar	NEAT	EUN	1.8 km	MPC · JPL
293259	2007 CL_{18}	—	February 8, 2007	Mount Lemmon	Mount Lemmon Survey	VER	4.1 km	MPC · JPL
293260	2007 CE_{19}	—	February 9, 2007	7300	W. K. Y. Yeung	·	1.2 km	MPC · JPL
293261	2007 CX_{20}	—	February 6, 2007	Mount Lemmon	Mount Lemmon Survey	·	2.5 km	MPC · JPL
293262	2007 CJ_{21}	—	February 6, 2007	Palomar	NEAT	·	3.7 km	MPC · JPL
293263	2007 CR_{22}	—	February 6, 2007	Mount Lemmon	Mount Lemmon Survey	·	3.2 km	MPC · JPL
293264	2007 CO_{24}	—	February 8, 2007	Mount Lemmon	Mount Lemmon Survey	·	2.5 km	MPC · JPL
293265	2007 CW_{24}	—	February 8, 2007	Mount Lemmon	Mount Lemmon Survey	·	4.4 km	MPC · JPL
293266	2007 CJ_{25}	—	February 8, 2007	Kitt Peak	Spacewatch	EUP	6.1 km	MPC · JPL
293267	2007 CP_{25}	—	February 9, 2007	Kitt Peak	Spacewatch	·	2.0 km	MPC · JPL
293268	2007 CY_{32}	—	February 6, 2007	Mount Lemmon	Mount Lemmon Survey	MAS	640 m	MPC · JPL
293269	2007 CY_{33}	—	February 6, 2007	Mount Lemmon	Mount Lemmon Survey	·	2.6 km	MPC · JPL
293270	2007 CC_{34}	—	February 6, 2007	Mount Lemmon	Mount Lemmon Survey	AGN	1.5 km	MPC · JPL
293271	2007 CS_{39}	—	February 6, 2007	Mount Lemmon	Mount Lemmon Survey	·	2.4 km	MPC · JPL
293272	2007 CR_{40}	—	February 7, 2007	Kitt Peak	Spacewatch	·	1.6 km	MPC · JPL
293273	2007 CT_{43}	—	February 8, 2007	Kitt Peak	Spacewatch	·	2.1 km	MPC · JPL
293274	2007 CW_{46}	—	February 8, 2007	Palomar	NEAT	·	2.3 km	MPC · JPL
293275	2007 CZ_{46}	—	February 8, 2007	Palomar	NEAT	·	2.1 km	MPC · JPL
293276	2007 CJ_{48}	—	February 10, 2007	Mount Lemmon	Mount Lemmon Survey	·	3.2 km	MPC · JPL
293277	2007 CM_{48}	—	February 10, 2007	Mount Lemmon	Mount Lemmon Survey	EOS	1.6 km	MPC · JPL
293278	2007 CO_{50}	—	February 9, 2007	Kitt Peak	Spacewatch	·	2.1 km	MPC · JPL
293279	2007 CN_{54}	—	February 14, 2007	Lulin	Lin, C.-S., Q. Ye	·	1.1 km	MPC · JPL
293280	2007 CW_{55}	—	February 13, 2007	Mount Lemmon	Mount Lemmon Survey	·	5.3 km	MPC · JPL
293281	2007 CY_{56}	—	November 15, 2006	Mount Lemmon	Mount Lemmon Survey	·	2.1 km	MPC · JPL
293282	2007 CZ_{58}	—	February 10, 2007	Palomar	NEAT	·	2.3 km	MPC · JPL
293283	2007 CV_{59}	—	February 10, 2007	Catalina	CSS	·	1.6 km	MPC · JPL
293284	2007 CD_{60}	—	February 10, 2007	Catalina	CSS	VER	4.2 km	MPC · JPL
293285	2007 CV_{63}	—	February 15, 2007	Catalina	CSS	·	2.8 km	MPC · JPL
293286	2007 DM	—	February 16, 2007	Wildberg	R. Apitzsch	·	2.3 km	MPC · JPL
293287	2007 DS_{1}	—	February 16, 2007	Mount Lemmon	Mount Lemmon Survey	·	1.6 km	MPC · JPL
293288	2007 DG_{4}	—	February 16, 2007	Mount Lemmon	Mount Lemmon Survey	EOS	2.3 km	MPC · JPL
293289	2007 DC_{7}	—	February 18, 2007	Socorro	LINEAR	·	2.9 km	MPC · JPL
293290	2007 DG_{7}	—	February 17, 2007	Mount Lemmon	Mount Lemmon Survey	(31811)	3.5 km	MPC · JPL
293291	2007 DT_{11}	—	February 16, 2007	Palomar	NEAT	·	1.8 km	MPC · JPL
293292	2007 DU_{14}	—	February 17, 2007	Kitt Peak	Spacewatch	·	2.2 km	MPC · JPL
293293	2007 DL_{15}	—	February 17, 2007	Kitt Peak	Spacewatch	·	2.1 km	MPC · JPL
293294	2007 DT_{15}	—	February 17, 2007	Kitt Peak	Spacewatch	EOS	2.2 km	MPC · JPL
293295	2007 DK_{18}	—	February 17, 2007	Kitt Peak	Spacewatch	·	1.3 km	MPC · JPL
293296	2007 DR_{20}	—	February 17, 2007	Kitt Peak	Spacewatch	·	1.6 km	MPC · JPL
293297	2007 DL_{23}	—	February 17, 2007	Kitt Peak	Spacewatch	·	2.7 km	MPC · JPL
293298	2007 DD_{24}	—	February 17, 2007	Kitt Peak	Spacewatch	·	2.1 km	MPC · JPL
293299	2007 DT_{25}	—	February 17, 2007	Kitt Peak	Spacewatch	·	660 m	MPC · JPL
293300	2007 DP_{27}	—	February 17, 2007	Kitt Peak	Spacewatch	·	3.3 km	MPC · JPL

== 293301–293400 ==
back to top

Designation			Discovery			Properties		Ref
Permanent	Provisional	Named after	Date	Site	Discoverer(s)	Category	Diam.	Ref
293301	2007 DX_{28}	—	February 17, 2007	Kitt Peak	Spacewatch	·	2.4 km	MPC · JPL
293302	2007 DD_{30}	—	February 17, 2007	Kitt Peak	Spacewatch	EOS	2.5 km	MPC · JPL
293303	2007 DY_{30}	—	February 17, 2007	Kitt Peak	Spacewatch	·	1.8 km	MPC · JPL
293304	2007 DV_{32}	—	February 17, 2007	Kitt Peak	Spacewatch	·	3.4 km	MPC · JPL
293305	2007 DQ_{33}	—	February 17, 2007	Kitt Peak	Spacewatch	·	1.9 km	MPC · JPL
293306	2007 DR_{33}	—	February 17, 2007	Kitt Peak	Spacewatch	·	2.0 km	MPC · JPL
293307	2007 DQ_{37}	—	February 17, 2007	Kitt Peak	Spacewatch	L5	9.6 km	MPC · JPL
293308	2007 DT_{37}	—	February 17, 2007	Kitt Peak	Spacewatch	·	1.8 km	MPC · JPL
293309	2007 DF_{39}	—	February 17, 2007	Kitt Peak	Spacewatch	·	2.3 km	MPC · JPL
293310	2007 DW_{40}	—	February 21, 2007	Calvin-Rehoboth	Calvin College	RAF	830 m	MPC · JPL
293311	2007 DS_{41}	—	February 16, 2007	Mount Lemmon	Mount Lemmon Survey	·	3.2 km	MPC · JPL
293312	2007 DU_{42}	—	February 17, 2007	Catalina	CSS	EUN	1.8 km	MPC · JPL
293313	2007 DV_{44}	—	February 19, 2007	Kitt Peak	Spacewatch	·	3.8 km	MPC · JPL
293314	2007 DD_{45}	—	February 19, 2007	Mount Lemmon	Mount Lemmon Survey	·	1.7 km	MPC · JPL
293315	2007 DY_{46}	—	February 21, 2007	Socorro	LINEAR	·	3.0 km	MPC · JPL
293316	2007 DN_{47}	—	February 21, 2007	Mount Lemmon	Mount Lemmon Survey	·	1.0 km	MPC · JPL
293317	2007 DO_{50}	—	February 17, 2007	Kitt Peak	Spacewatch	·	2.1 km	MPC · JPL
293318	2007 DA_{51}	—	February 17, 2007	Kitt Peak	Spacewatch	·	2.0 km	MPC · JPL
293319	2007 DG_{51}	—	February 17, 2007	Catalina	CSS	·	1.1 km	MPC · JPL
293320	2007 DQ_{52}	—	February 19, 2007	Mount Lemmon	Mount Lemmon Survey	·	2.3 km	MPC · JPL
293321	2007 DV_{53}	—	February 19, 2007	Mount Lemmon	Mount Lemmon Survey	·	5.5 km	MPC · JPL
293322	2007 DC_{55}	—	February 21, 2007	Socorro	LINEAR	·	3.7 km	MPC · JPL
293323	2007 DE_{58}	—	February 21, 2007	Kitt Peak	Spacewatch	·	1.8 km	MPC · JPL
293324	2007 DG_{58}	—	February 21, 2007	Kitt Peak	Spacewatch	·	1.8 km	MPC · JPL
293325	2007 DL_{58}	—	February 21, 2007	Kitt Peak	Spacewatch	·	3.3 km	MPC · JPL
293326	2007 DT_{63}	—	February 21, 2007	Kitt Peak	Spacewatch	·	3.4 km	MPC · JPL
293327	2007 DS_{65}	—	February 21, 2007	Socorro	LINEAR	·	1.5 km	MPC · JPL
293328	2007 DT_{65}	—	February 21, 2007	Socorro	LINEAR	·	1.6 km	MPC · JPL
293329	2007 DG_{67}	—	February 21, 2007	Kitt Peak	Spacewatch	THM	3.3 km	MPC · JPL
293330	2007 DZ_{67}	—	February 21, 2007	Kitt Peak	Spacewatch	·	2.9 km	MPC · JPL
293331	2007 DY_{68}	—	February 21, 2007	Kitt Peak	Spacewatch	L5	9.5 km	MPC · JPL
293332	2007 DV_{71}	—	February 21, 2007	Kitt Peak	Spacewatch	·	3.0 km	MPC · JPL
293333	2007 DB_{75}	—	February 21, 2007	Kitt Peak	Spacewatch	·	1.6 km	MPC · JPL
293334	2007 DE_{77}	—	February 22, 2007	Catalina	CSS	EOS	2.1 km	MPC · JPL
293335	2007 DW_{79}	—	February 23, 2007	Mount Lemmon	Mount Lemmon Survey	·	1.6 km	MPC · JPL
293336	2007 DW_{86}	—	February 23, 2007	Mount Lemmon	Mount Lemmon Survey	·	2.8 km	MPC · JPL
293337	2007 DZ_{86}	—	February 23, 2007	Mount Lemmon	Mount Lemmon Survey	SYL · CYB	6.0 km	MPC · JPL
293338	2007 DK_{87}	—	February 23, 2007	Kitt Peak	Spacewatch	THM	3.1 km	MPC · JPL
293339	2007 DD_{90}	—	February 23, 2007	Kitt Peak	Spacewatch	·	3.9 km	MPC · JPL
293340	2007 DH_{90}	—	February 23, 2007	Kitt Peak	Spacewatch	KOR	1.5 km	MPC · JPL
293341	2007 DM_{92}	—	February 23, 2007	Kitt Peak	Spacewatch	KOR	1.7 km	MPC · JPL
293342	2007 DR_{97}	—	February 23, 2007	Kitt Peak	Spacewatch	·	4.6 km	MPC · JPL
293343	2007 DW_{98}	—	February 25, 2007	Mount Lemmon	Mount Lemmon Survey	·	3.6 km	MPC · JPL
293344	2007 DM_{100}	—	February 25, 2007	Kitt Peak	Spacewatch	·	2.5 km	MPC · JPL
293345	2007 DD_{105}	—	February 21, 2007	Mount Lemmon	Mount Lemmon Survey	·	960 m	MPC · JPL
293346	2007 DG_{105}	—	February 26, 2007	Mount Lemmon	Mount Lemmon Survey	CYB	4.9 km	MPC · JPL
293347	2007 DP_{105}	—	February 17, 2007	Kitt Peak	Spacewatch	·	1.4 km	MPC · JPL
293348	2007 DW_{105}	—	February 21, 2007	Mount Lemmon	Mount Lemmon Survey	·	1.8 km	MPC · JPL
293349	2007 DS_{106}	—	February 22, 2007	Kitt Peak	Spacewatch	·	1.4 km	MPC · JPL
293350	2007 DX_{106}	—	February 23, 2007	Kitt Peak	Spacewatch	HYG	3.4 km	MPC · JPL
293351	2007 DH_{109}	—	February 22, 2007	Catalina	CSS	H	830 m	MPC · JPL
293352	2007 DS_{109}	—	February 19, 2007	Mount Lemmon	Mount Lemmon Survey	KOR	1.5 km	MPC · JPL
293353	2007 DZ_{109}	—	February 25, 2007	Mount Lemmon	Mount Lemmon Survey	·	1.2 km	MPC · JPL
293354	2007 DB_{110}	—	February 27, 2007	Kitt Peak	Spacewatch	·	1.6 km	MPC · JPL
293355	2007 DM_{110}	—	February 17, 2007	Mount Lemmon	Mount Lemmon Survey	·	1.6 km	MPC · JPL
293356	2007 DV_{111}	—	February 25, 2007	Mount Lemmon	Mount Lemmon Survey	·	950 m	MPC · JPL
293357	2007 DF_{113}	—	February 17, 2007	Mount Lemmon	Mount Lemmon Survey	EOS	2.7 km	MPC · JPL
293358	2007 DT_{115}	—	February 21, 2007	Mount Lemmon	Mount Lemmon Survey	·	2.5 km	MPC · JPL
293359	2007 EE	—	March 7, 2007	Wildberg	R. Apitzsch	·	1.3 km	MPC · JPL
293360	2007 EV_{1}	—	March 9, 2007	Kitt Peak	Spacewatch	·	2.1 km	MPC · JPL
293361	2007 EN_{2}	—	March 9, 2007	Catalina	CSS	·	770 m	MPC · JPL
293362	2007 ET_{2}	—	March 9, 2007	Mount Lemmon	Mount Lemmon Survey	KOR	1.4 km	MPC · JPL
293363	2007 EX_{4}	—	March 9, 2007	Palomar	NEAT	EOS	2.8 km	MPC · JPL
293364	2007 EQ_{5}	—	March 9, 2007	Mount Lemmon	Mount Lemmon Survey	KOR	1.4 km	MPC · JPL
293365	2007 EM_{7}	—	March 9, 2007	Mount Lemmon	Mount Lemmon Survey	·	2.4 km	MPC · JPL
293366 Roux	2007 EQ_{9}	Roux	March 9, 2007	Saint-Sulpice	B. Christophe	·	2.4 km	MPC · JPL
293367	2007 EU_{10}	—	March 9, 2007	Kitt Peak	Spacewatch	HOF	3.2 km	MPC · JPL
293368	2007 EE_{11}	—	March 9, 2007	Kitt Peak	Spacewatch	·	3.5 km	MPC · JPL
293369	2007 ER_{13}	—	March 9, 2007	Mount Lemmon	Mount Lemmon Survey	·	3.2 km	MPC · JPL
293370	2007 EF_{17}	—	March 9, 2007	Mount Lemmon	Mount Lemmon Survey	L5	12 km	MPC · JPL
293371	2007 ED_{18}	—	March 9, 2007	Mount Lemmon	Mount Lemmon Survey	VER	2.9 km	MPC · JPL
293372	2007 ER_{18}	—	March 9, 2007	Lulin	Lin, C.-S., Q. Ye	·	1.9 km	MPC · JPL
293373	2007 ER_{19}	—	March 10, 2007	Mount Lemmon	Mount Lemmon Survey	NEM	2.6 km	MPC · JPL
293374	2007 ES_{20}	—	March 10, 2007	Kitt Peak	Spacewatch	·	1.6 km	MPC · JPL
293375	2007 EU_{20}	—	March 10, 2007	Kitt Peak	Spacewatch	·	1.1 km	MPC · JPL
293376	2007 EZ_{20}	—	March 10, 2007	Kitt Peak	Spacewatch	·	2.3 km	MPC · JPL
293377	2007 EN_{25}	—	March 10, 2007	Mount Lemmon	Mount Lemmon Survey	·	1.0 km	MPC · JPL
293378	2007 EL_{28}	—	March 9, 2007	Palomar	NEAT	EUN	930 m	MPC · JPL
293379	2007 EZ_{29}	—	March 9, 2007	Kitt Peak	Spacewatch	·	2.7 km	MPC · JPL
293380	2007 ER_{33}	—	March 10, 2007	Mount Lemmon	Mount Lemmon Survey	·	1.0 km	MPC · JPL
293381	2007 EH_{36}	—	March 11, 2007	Anderson Mesa	LONEOS	·	3.4 km	MPC · JPL
293382	2007 EL_{36}	—	March 11, 2007	Anderson Mesa	LONEOS	·	1.4 km	MPC · JPL
293383 Maigret	2007 EZ_{38}	Maigret	March 11, 2007	Saint-Sulpice	B. Christophe	·	3.2 km	MPC · JPL
293384	2007 ED_{41}	—	March 9, 2007	Kitt Peak	Spacewatch	·	1.4 km	MPC · JPL
293385	2007 EV_{43}	—	March 9, 2007	Kitt Peak	Spacewatch	·	3.8 km	MPC · JPL
293386	2007 EW_{43}	—	March 9, 2007	Kitt Peak	Spacewatch	L5	13 km	MPC · JPL
293387	2007 EC_{44}	—	March 9, 2007	Kitt Peak	Spacewatch	·	2.6 km	MPC · JPL
293388	2007 EV_{44}	—	March 9, 2007	Mount Lemmon	Mount Lemmon Survey	THM	2.8 km	MPC · JPL
293389	2007 EV_{45}	—	March 9, 2007	Kitt Peak	Spacewatch	·	2.5 km	MPC · JPL
293390	2007 EL_{46}	—	March 9, 2007	Kitt Peak	Spacewatch	MAS	960 m	MPC · JPL
293391	2007 EE_{48}	—	March 9, 2007	Kitt Peak	Spacewatch	·	1.6 km	MPC · JPL
293392	2007 ES_{51}	—	March 11, 2007	Kitt Peak	Spacewatch	·	3.2 km	MPC · JPL
293393	2007 EP_{53}	—	March 11, 2007	Mount Lemmon	Mount Lemmon Survey	·	2.8 km	MPC · JPL
293394	2007 EE_{59}	—	March 9, 2007	Mount Lemmon	Mount Lemmon Survey	·	610 m	MPC · JPL
293395	2007 EV_{63}	—	March 10, 2007	Kitt Peak	Spacewatch	·	1.6 km	MPC · JPL
293396	2007 EW_{64}	—	March 10, 2007	Kitt Peak	Spacewatch	·	1.0 km	MPC · JPL
293397	2007 EZ_{66}	—	March 10, 2007	Kitt Peak	Spacewatch	·	2.0 km	MPC · JPL
293398	2007 EU_{68}	—	March 10, 2007	Kitt Peak	Spacewatch	THM	2.9 km	MPC · JPL
293399	2007 EB_{71}	—	March 10, 2007	Kitt Peak	Spacewatch	·	2.0 km	MPC · JPL
293400	2007 EX_{72}	—	March 10, 2007	Kitt Peak	Spacewatch	·	4.8 km	MPC · JPL

== 293401–293500 ==
back to top

Designation			Discovery			Properties		Ref
Permanent	Provisional	Named after	Date	Site	Discoverer(s)	Category	Diam.	Ref
293401	2007 ED_{73}	—	March 10, 2007	Kitt Peak	Spacewatch	·	1.9 km	MPC · JPL
293402	2007 EC_{74}	—	March 10, 2007	Kitt Peak	Spacewatch	·	1.6 km	MPC · JPL
293403	2007 ED_{74}	—	March 10, 2007	Kitt Peak	Spacewatch	NAE	3.1 km	MPC · JPL
293404	2007 EN_{79}	—	March 10, 2007	Kitt Peak	Spacewatch	·	1.5 km	MPC · JPL
293405	2007 EP_{79}	—	March 10, 2007	Kitt Peak	Spacewatch	·	3.0 km	MPC · JPL
293406	2007 EH_{82}	—	March 11, 2007	Anderson Mesa	LONEOS	·	5.0 km	MPC · JPL
293407	2007 ER_{82}	—	March 12, 2007	Kitt Peak	Spacewatch	(5)	1.2 km	MPC · JPL
293408	2007 EU_{84}	—	March 12, 2007	Catalina	CSS	·	4.7 km	MPC · JPL
293409	2007 EJ_{86}	—	March 12, 2007	Kitt Peak	Spacewatch	TIR	4.5 km	MPC · JPL
293410	2007 EV_{86}	—	March 13, 2007	Catalina	CSS	·	3.1 km	MPC · JPL
293411	2007 EE_{87}	—	March 13, 2007	Catalina	CSS	H	560 m	MPC · JPL
293412	2007 ES_{89}	—	March 9, 2007	Palomar	NEAT	·	2.9 km	MPC · JPL
293413	2007 ET_{94}	—	March 10, 2007	Mount Lemmon	Mount Lemmon Survey	·	1.9 km	MPC · JPL
293414	2007 EW_{98}	—	March 11, 2007	Kitt Peak	Spacewatch	·	1.7 km	MPC · JPL
293415	2007 EZ_{99}	—	March 11, 2007	Kitt Peak	Spacewatch	·	1.7 km	MPC · JPL
293416	2007 ED_{100}	—	March 11, 2007	Kitt Peak	Spacewatch	(21344)	1.7 km	MPC · JPL
293417	2007 EF_{100}	—	March 11, 2007	Kitt Peak	Spacewatch	·	1.5 km	MPC · JPL
293418	2007 EK_{105}	—	March 11, 2007	Mount Lemmon	Mount Lemmon Survey	L5	12 km	MPC · JPL
293419	2007 EM_{110}	—	March 11, 2007	Kitt Peak	Spacewatch	MRX	1.1 km	MPC · JPL
293420	2007 EQ_{111}	—	March 11, 2007	Kitt Peak	Spacewatch	·	1.9 km	MPC · JPL
293421	2007 EV_{111}	—	March 11, 2007	Kitt Peak	Spacewatch	·	3.7 km	MPC · JPL
293422	2007 EK_{112}	—	March 11, 2007	Mount Lemmon	Mount Lemmon Survey	·	730 m	MPC · JPL
293423	2007 EZ_{112}	—	March 11, 2007	Kitt Peak	Spacewatch	·	1.3 km	MPC · JPL
293424	2007 EX_{117}	—	March 13, 2007	Mount Lemmon	Mount Lemmon Survey	·	3.7 km	MPC · JPL
293425	2007 EQ_{123}	—	March 14, 2007	Mount Lemmon	Mount Lemmon Survey	·	2.6 km	MPC · JPL
293426	2007 EC_{128}	—	March 9, 2007	Mount Lemmon	Mount Lemmon Survey	·	2.1 km	MPC · JPL
293427	2007 EU_{131}	—	March 9, 2007	Mount Lemmon	Mount Lemmon Survey	·	4.2 km	MPC · JPL
293428	2007 EP_{135}	—	March 10, 2007	Mount Lemmon	Mount Lemmon Survey	·	4.3 km	MPC · JPL
293429	2007 EO_{137}	—	March 11, 2007	Kitt Peak	Spacewatch	·	1.3 km	MPC · JPL
293430	2007 EH_{142}	—	March 12, 2007	Kitt Peak	Spacewatch	·	2.6 km	MPC · JPL
293431	2007 ET_{142}	—	March 12, 2007	Kitt Peak	Spacewatch	·	760 m	MPC · JPL
293432	2007 EH_{145}	—	March 12, 2007	Mount Lemmon	Mount Lemmon Survey	KOR	1.4 km	MPC · JPL
293433	2007 EU_{149}	—	March 12, 2007	Mount Lemmon	Mount Lemmon Survey	·	1.9 km	MPC · JPL
293434	2007 EM_{150}	—	March 12, 2007	Mount Lemmon	Mount Lemmon Survey	EOS	2.5 km	MPC · JPL
293435	2007 EN_{152}	—	March 12, 2007	Mount Lemmon	Mount Lemmon Survey	·	1.7 km	MPC · JPL
293436	2007 ES_{152}	—	March 12, 2007	Mount Lemmon	Mount Lemmon Survey	·	2.3 km	MPC · JPL
293437	2007 EB_{155}	—	March 12, 2007	Kitt Peak	Spacewatch	·	3.4 km	MPC · JPL
293438	2007 EU_{156}	—	March 12, 2007	Kitt Peak	Spacewatch	·	4.5 km	MPC · JPL
293439	2007 EL_{157}	—	March 13, 2007	Mount Lemmon	Mount Lemmon Survey	·	3.0 km	MPC · JPL
293440	2007 EX_{159}	—	March 14, 2007	Mount Lemmon	Mount Lemmon Survey	·	4.7 km	MPC · JPL
293441	2007 EL_{160}	—	March 14, 2007	Kitt Peak	Spacewatch	H	850 m	MPC · JPL
293442	2007 EN_{164}	—	March 15, 2007	Kitt Peak	Spacewatch	·	760 m	MPC · JPL
293443	2007 EX_{166}	—	March 11, 2007	Mount Lemmon	Mount Lemmon Survey	EOS	2.3 km	MPC · JPL
293444	2007 ES_{167}	—	March 13, 2007	Mount Lemmon	Mount Lemmon Survey	·	3.7 km	MPC · JPL
293445	2007 EW_{168}	—	March 13, 2007	Kitt Peak	Spacewatch	·	1.6 km	MPC · JPL
293446	2007 EJ_{169}	—	March 13, 2007	Kitt Peak	Spacewatch	·	4.1 km	MPC · JPL
293447	2007 EN_{169}	—	March 13, 2007	Kitt Peak	Spacewatch	THM	2.6 km	MPC · JPL
293448	2007 EA_{173}	—	March 14, 2007	Kitt Peak	Spacewatch	·	4.7 km	MPC · JPL
293449	2007 EV_{174}	—	March 14, 2007	Kitt Peak	Spacewatch	·	2.1 km	MPC · JPL
293450	2007 EO_{178}	—	March 14, 2007	Kitt Peak	Spacewatch	·	1.0 km	MPC · JPL
293451	2007 ET_{178}	—	March 14, 2007	Kitt Peak	Spacewatch	·	1.3 km	MPC · JPL
293452	2007 EN_{180}	—	March 14, 2007	Mount Lemmon	Mount Lemmon Survey	V	790 m	MPC · JPL
293453	2007 EA_{184}	—	March 12, 2007	Mount Lemmon	Mount Lemmon Survey	·	1.6 km	MPC · JPL
293454	2007 ET_{184}	—	March 13, 2007	Catalina	CSS	H	850 m	MPC · JPL
293455	2007 EB_{191}	—	March 13, 2007	Kitt Peak	Spacewatch	·	4.5 km	MPC · JPL
293456	2007 EW_{191}	—	March 13, 2007	Kitt Peak	Spacewatch	L5	9.9 km	MPC · JPL
293457	2007 EY_{194}	—	March 15, 2007	Kitt Peak	Spacewatch	MIS	2.3 km	MPC · JPL
293458	2007 ET_{195}	—	March 15, 2007	Catalina	CSS	EUN	1.6 km	MPC · JPL
293459	2007 ED_{197}	—	March 15, 2007	Kitt Peak	Spacewatch	·	3.6 km	MPC · JPL
293460	2007 ES_{197}	—	March 15, 2007	Kitt Peak	Spacewatch	·	950 m	MPC · JPL
293461	2007 EB_{203}	—	March 10, 2007	Kitt Peak	Spacewatch	·	640 m	MPC · JPL
293462	2007 ED_{204}	—	March 10, 2007	Mount Lemmon	Mount Lemmon Survey	·	1.9 km	MPC · JPL
293463	2007 EK_{205}	—	March 11, 2007	Kitt Peak	Spacewatch	EOS	2.2 km	MPC · JPL
293464	2007 EN_{205}	—	March 11, 2007	Kitt Peak	Spacewatch	THM	4.6 km	MPC · JPL
293465	2007 EB_{209}	—	March 14, 2007	Kitt Peak	Spacewatch	·	4.2 km	MPC · JPL
293466	2007 ES_{209}	—	March 15, 2007	Mount Lemmon	Mount Lemmon Survey	·	4.6 km	MPC · JPL
293467	2007 ED_{211}	—	March 8, 2007	Palomar	NEAT	·	3.7 km	MPC · JPL
293468	2007 EE_{213}	—	March 14, 2007	Siding Spring	SSS	·	1.9 km	MPC · JPL
293469	2007 EV_{214}	—	March 9, 2007	Kitt Peak	Spacewatch	·	3.8 km	MPC · JPL
293470	2007 EF_{215}	—	March 11, 2007	Catalina	CSS	·	2.4 km	MPC · JPL
293471	2007 EB_{217}	—	March 9, 2007	Mount Lemmon	Mount Lemmon Survey	·	1.7 km	MPC · JPL
293472	2007 EA_{218}	—	March 9, 2007	Kitt Peak	Spacewatch	(883)	950 m	MPC · JPL
293473	2007 EA_{220}	—	March 13, 2007	Kitt Peak	Spacewatch	·	4.0 km	MPC · JPL
293474	2007 EN_{220}	—	March 15, 2007	Mount Lemmon	Mount Lemmon Survey	·	3.6 km	MPC · JPL
293475	2007 ER_{220}	—	March 11, 2007	Mount Lemmon	Mount Lemmon Survey	CYB	4.3 km	MPC · JPL
293476	2007 EF_{221}	—	March 13, 2007	Mount Lemmon	Mount Lemmon Survey	·	860 m	MPC · JPL
293477 Teotihuacan	2007 FY	Teotihuacan	March 16, 2007	Vallemare Borbona	V. S. Casulli	·	1.9 km	MPC · JPL
293478	2007 FL_{2}	—	March 16, 2007	Catalina	CSS	·	5.5 km	MPC · JPL
293479	2007 FE_{10}	—	March 16, 2007	Kitt Peak	Spacewatch	·	930 m	MPC · JPL
293480	2007 FO_{15}	—	March 18, 2007	Kitt Peak	Spacewatch	·	3.1 km	MPC · JPL
293481	2007 FV_{17}	—	March 20, 2007	Socorro	LINEAR	·	950 m	MPC · JPL
293482	2007 FK_{18}	—	March 20, 2007	Anderson Mesa	LONEOS	·	4.6 km	MPC · JPL
293483	2007 FK_{24}	—	March 20, 2007	Kitt Peak	Spacewatch	·	3.4 km	MPC · JPL
293484	2007 FH_{27}	—	March 20, 2007	Mount Lemmon	Mount Lemmon Survey	KOR	1.9 km	MPC · JPL
293485	2007 FQ_{27}	—	March 20, 2007	Mount Lemmon	Mount Lemmon Survey	HOF	3.1 km	MPC · JPL
293486	2007 FA_{28}	—	March 20, 2007	Mount Lemmon	Mount Lemmon Survey	L5	17 km	MPC · JPL
293487	2007 FL_{28}	—	March 20, 2007	Mount Lemmon	Mount Lemmon Survey	EOS	2.8 km	MPC · JPL
293488	2007 FG_{30}	—	March 20, 2007	Mount Lemmon	Mount Lemmon Survey	·	5.0 km	MPC · JPL
293489	2007 FS_{31}	—	March 20, 2007	Kitt Peak	Spacewatch	·	3.7 km	MPC · JPL
293490	2007 FR_{33}	—	March 25, 2007	Mount Lemmon	Mount Lemmon Survey	·	1.1 km	MPC · JPL
293491	2007 FE_{37}	—	March 26, 2007	Mount Lemmon	Mount Lemmon Survey	·	1.3 km	MPC · JPL
293492	2007 FP_{44}	—	March 20, 2007	Kitt Peak	Spacewatch	·	1.4 km	MPC · JPL
293493	2007 FG_{45}	—	March 20, 2007	Kitt Peak	Spacewatch	(16286)	2.1 km	MPC · JPL
293494	2007 FO_{46}	—	March 26, 2007	Mount Lemmon	Mount Lemmon Survey	KOR	1.4 km	MPC · JPL
293495	2007 FN_{49}	—	March 16, 2007	Mount Lemmon	Mount Lemmon Survey	·	980 m	MPC · JPL
293496	2007 FE_{50}	—	March 26, 2007	Kitt Peak	Spacewatch	·	3.3 km	MPC · JPL
293497	2007 GQ	—	April 7, 2007	Mount Lemmon	Mount Lemmon Survey	GEF	1.8 km	MPC · JPL
293498	2007 GJ_{2}	—	April 9, 2007	Siding Spring	SSS	·	3.6 km	MPC · JPL
293499 Wolinski	2007 GP_{5}	Wolinski	April 14, 2007	Nogales	J.-C. Merlin	(21885)	3.7 km	MPC · JPL
293500	2007 GS_{7}	—	April 7, 2007	Catalina	CSS	·	2.3 km	MPC · JPL

== 293501–293600 ==
back to top

Designation			Discovery			Properties		Ref
Permanent	Provisional	Named after	Date	Site	Discoverer(s)	Category	Diam.	Ref
293501	2007 GD_{9}	—	April 8, 2007	Kitt Peak	Spacewatch	·	920 m	MPC · JPL
293502	2007 GO_{10}	—	April 11, 2007	Kitt Peak	Spacewatch	L5	8.5 km	MPC · JPL
293503	2007 GR_{10}	—	April 11, 2007	Kitt Peak	Spacewatch	AGN	1.6 km	MPC · JPL
293504	2007 GZ_{12}	—	April 11, 2007	Kitt Peak	Spacewatch	·	2.1 km	MPC · JPL
293505	2007 GR_{13}	—	April 11, 2007	Kitt Peak	Spacewatch	·	3.3 km	MPC · JPL
293506	2007 GY_{15}	—	April 11, 2007	Mount Lemmon	Mount Lemmon Survey	·	2.7 km	MPC · JPL
293507	2007 GG_{19}	—	April 11, 2007	Kitt Peak	Spacewatch	·	1.2 km	MPC · JPL
293508	2007 GU_{19}	—	April 11, 2007	Kitt Peak	Spacewatch	KOR	1.5 km	MPC · JPL
293509	2007 GB_{20}	—	April 11, 2007	Kitt Peak	Spacewatch	·	960 m	MPC · JPL
293510	2007 GJ_{22}	—	April 11, 2007	Mount Lemmon	Mount Lemmon Survey	·	2.1 km	MPC · JPL
293511	2007 GQ_{29}	—	April 11, 2007	Siding Spring	SSS	·	4.4 km	MPC · JPL
293512	2007 GW_{29}	—	April 13, 2007	Siding Spring	SSS	·	7.0 km	MPC · JPL
293513	2007 GC_{30}	—	April 14, 2007	Mount Lemmon	Mount Lemmon Survey	·	980 m	MPC · JPL
293514	2007 GB_{31}	—	April 14, 2007	Mount Lemmon	Mount Lemmon Survey	HYG	3.9 km	MPC · JPL
293515	2007 GE_{33}	—	April 11, 2007	Catalina	CSS	·	3.4 km	MPC · JPL
293516	2007 GU_{34}	—	April 14, 2007	Kitt Peak	Spacewatch	L5	9.7 km	MPC · JPL
293517	2007 GY_{34}	—	April 14, 2007	Kitt Peak	Spacewatch	·	1.5 km	MPC · JPL
293518	2007 GU_{36}	—	April 14, 2007	Kitt Peak	Spacewatch	·	710 m	MPC · JPL
293519	2007 GV_{37}	—	April 14, 2007	Kitt Peak	Spacewatch	·	2.3 km	MPC · JPL
293520	2007 GP_{46}	—	April 14, 2007	Kitt Peak	Spacewatch	TEL	1.9 km	MPC · JPL
293521	2007 GM_{47}	—	April 14, 2007	Mount Lemmon	Mount Lemmon Survey	NYS	1.6 km	MPC · JPL
293522	2007 GS_{48}	—	April 14, 2007	Kitt Peak	Spacewatch	V	710 m	MPC · JPL
293523	2007 GL_{52}	—	April 14, 2007	Kitt Peak	Spacewatch	·	2.5 km	MPC · JPL
293524	2007 GA_{53}	—	April 14, 2007	Kitt Peak	Spacewatch	·	4.1 km	MPC · JPL
293525	2007 GG_{53}	—	April 14, 2007	Mount Lemmon	Mount Lemmon Survey	·	3.5 km	MPC · JPL
293526	2007 GX_{54}	—	April 15, 2007	Kitt Peak	Spacewatch	·	1.2 km	MPC · JPL
293527	2007 GN_{60}	—	April 15, 2007	Kitt Peak	Spacewatch	·	1.5 km	MPC · JPL
293528	2007 GW_{60}	—	April 15, 2007	Kitt Peak	Spacewatch	·	2.4 km	MPC · JPL
293529	2007 GB_{62}	—	April 15, 2007	Kitt Peak	Spacewatch	·	2.8 km	MPC · JPL
293530	2007 GK_{62}	—	April 15, 2007	Catalina	CSS	·	700 m	MPC · JPL
293531	2007 GR_{62}	—	April 15, 2007	Catalina	CSS	·	1.7 km	MPC · JPL
293532	2007 GW_{64}	—	April 15, 2007	Kitt Peak	Spacewatch	·	710 m	MPC · JPL
293533	2007 GX_{65}	—	April 15, 2007	Catalina	CSS	·	5.1 km	MPC · JPL
293534	2007 GG_{68}	—	April 14, 2007	Kitt Peak	Spacewatch	CYB	3.8 km	MPC · JPL
293535	2007 GK_{71}	—	April 14, 2007	Kitt Peak	Spacewatch	·	2.9 km	MPC · JPL
293536	2007 HL	—	April 16, 2007	Altschwendt	W. Ries	·	4.0 km	MPC · JPL
293537	2007 HR_{1}	—	April 16, 2007	Catalina	CSS	·	4.2 km	MPC · JPL
293538	2007 HS_{3}	—	April 17, 2007	Catalina	CSS	EUP	4.8 km	MPC · JPL
293539	2007 HD_{6}	—	April 16, 2007	Mount Lemmon	Mount Lemmon Survey	·	840 m	MPC · JPL
293540	2007 HQ_{6}	—	April 16, 2007	Mount Lemmon	Mount Lemmon Survey	·	2.8 km	MPC · JPL
293541	2007 HS_{7}	—	April 16, 2007	Purple Mountain	PMO NEO Survey Program	·	1.2 km	MPC · JPL
293542	2007 HR_{8}	—	April 18, 2007	Mount Lemmon	Mount Lemmon Survey	·	1.5 km	MPC · JPL
293543	2007 HT_{12}	—	April 16, 2007	Catalina	CSS	·	1.1 km	MPC · JPL
293544	2007 HN_{14}	—	April 19, 2007	Kitt Peak	Spacewatch	·	1.1 km	MPC · JPL
293545	2007 HK_{18}	—	April 16, 2007	Mount Lemmon	Mount Lemmon Survey	MAS	880 m	MPC · JPL
293546	2007 HX_{20}	—	April 18, 2007	Kitt Peak	Spacewatch	·	960 m	MPC · JPL
293547	2007 HB_{25}	—	April 18, 2007	Kitt Peak	Spacewatch	·	3.0 km	MPC · JPL
293548	2007 HB_{27}	—	April 18, 2007	Kitt Peak	Spacewatch	·	3.2 km	MPC · JPL
293549	2007 HL_{27}	—	April 18, 2007	Kitt Peak	Spacewatch	·	2.3 km	MPC · JPL
293550	2007 HE_{28}	—	April 18, 2007	Mount Lemmon	Mount Lemmon Survey	NYS	1.2 km	MPC · JPL
293551	2007 HH_{28}	—	April 18, 2007	Mount Lemmon	Mount Lemmon Survey	·	1.1 km	MPC · JPL
293552	2007 HD_{31}	—	April 19, 2007	Mount Lemmon	Mount Lemmon Survey	·	4.2 km	MPC · JPL
293553	2007 HJ_{36}	—	April 19, 2007	Kitt Peak	Spacewatch	·	880 m	MPC · JPL
293554	2007 HT_{36}	—	April 19, 2007	Kitt Peak	Spacewatch	·	1.1 km	MPC · JPL
293555	2007 HT_{37}	—	April 20, 2007	Kitt Peak	Spacewatch	·	1.1 km	MPC · JPL
293556	2007 HV_{37}	—	April 20, 2007	Kitt Peak	Spacewatch	HYG	4.4 km	MPC · JPL
293557	2007 HS_{38}	—	April 20, 2007	Mount Lemmon	Mount Lemmon Survey	L5	10 km	MPC · JPL
293558	2007 HC_{45}	—	April 18, 2007	Catalina	CSS	·	4.3 km	MPC · JPL
293559	2007 HE_{46}	—	April 19, 2007	Lulin	LUSS	·	2.7 km	MPC · JPL
293560	2007 HG_{48}	—	April 20, 2007	Kitt Peak	Spacewatch	·	4.5 km	MPC · JPL
293561	2007 HK_{49}	—	April 20, 2007	Kitt Peak	Spacewatch	·	820 m	MPC · JPL
293562	2007 HD_{51}	—	April 20, 2007	Kitt Peak	Spacewatch	·	1.7 km	MPC · JPL
293563	2007 HE_{52}	—	April 20, 2007	Kitt Peak	Spacewatch	·	4.1 km	MPC · JPL
293564	2007 HL_{53}	—	April 20, 2007	Kitt Peak	Spacewatch	·	840 m	MPC · JPL
293565	2007 HD_{55}	—	April 22, 2007	Kitt Peak	Spacewatch	·	4.2 km	MPC · JPL
293566	2007 HN_{57}	—	April 22, 2007	Mount Lemmon	Mount Lemmon Survey	·	1.9 km	MPC · JPL
293567	2007 HE_{58}	—	April 23, 2007	Catalina	CSS	·	2.6 km	MPC · JPL
293568	2007 HE_{64}	—	April 22, 2007	Mount Lemmon	Mount Lemmon Survey	·	2.6 km	MPC · JPL
293569	2007 HE_{72}	—	April 22, 2007	Kitt Peak	Spacewatch	MAS	820 m	MPC · JPL
293570	2007 HA_{73}	—	April 22, 2007	Kitt Peak	Spacewatch	·	1.7 km	MPC · JPL
293571	2007 HH_{73}	—	April 22, 2007	Kitt Peak	Spacewatch	HYG	3.2 km	MPC · JPL
293572	2007 HP_{74}	—	April 22, 2007	Kitt Peak	Spacewatch	EOS ·	4.2 km	MPC · JPL
293573	2007 HB_{80}	—	April 24, 2007	Kitt Peak	Spacewatch	·	2.8 km	MPC · JPL
293574	2007 HS_{81}	—	April 25, 2007	Mount Lemmon	Mount Lemmon Survey	·	3.2 km	MPC · JPL
293575	2007 HY_{81}	—	April 25, 2007	Kitt Peak	Spacewatch	V	770 m	MPC · JPL
293576	2007 HT_{82}	—	April 22, 2007	Kitt Peak	Spacewatch	·	4.0 km	MPC · JPL
293577	2007 HW_{82}	—	April 24, 2007	Kitt Peak	Spacewatch	(883)	800 m	MPC · JPL
293578	2007 HO_{83}	—	April 23, 2007	Kitt Peak	Spacewatch	·	4.1 km	MPC · JPL
293579	2007 HM_{89}	—	April 23, 2007	Catalina	CSS	·	1.3 km	MPC · JPL
293580	2007 JA_{1}	—	May 7, 2007	Kitt Peak	Spacewatch	·	730 m	MPC · JPL
293581	2007 JF_{1}	—	May 7, 2007	Kitt Peak	Spacewatch	·	1.1 km	MPC · JPL
293582	2007 JD_{2}	—	May 7, 2007	Mount Lemmon	Mount Lemmon Survey	·	1.8 km	MPC · JPL
293583	2007 JM_{2}	—	May 7, 2007	Purple Mountain	PMO NEO Survey Program	·	3.2 km	MPC · JPL
293584	2007 JV_{2}	—	May 9, 2007	Eskridge	G. Hug	·	4.0 km	MPC · JPL
293585	2007 JB_{3}	—	May 6, 2007	Kitt Peak	Spacewatch	·	840 m	MPC · JPL
293586	2007 JA_{9}	—	May 9, 2007	Mount Lemmon	Mount Lemmon Survey	·	870 m	MPC · JPL
293587	2007 JR_{9}	—	May 10, 2007	Mayhill	Lowe, A.	·	5.6 km	MPC · JPL
293588	2007 JO_{11}	—	May 7, 2007	Kitt Peak	Spacewatch	·	910 m	MPC · JPL
293589	2007 JM_{16}	—	May 11, 2007	Tiki	S. F. Hönig, Teamo, N.	·	1.2 km	MPC · JPL
293590	2007 JA_{19}	—	May 9, 2007	Kitt Peak	Spacewatch	·	730 m	MPC · JPL
293591	2007 JY_{25}	—	May 9, 2007	Kitt Peak	Spacewatch	·	770 m	MPC · JPL
293592	2007 JE_{29}	—	May 10, 2007	Mount Lemmon	Mount Lemmon Survey	·	2.6 km	MPC · JPL
293593	2007 JR_{29}	—	May 11, 2007	Kitt Peak	Spacewatch	NYS	1.1 km	MPC · JPL
293594	2007 JO_{30}	—	May 11, 2007	Mount Lemmon	Mount Lemmon Survey	·	2.1 km	MPC · JPL
293595	2007 JS_{30}	—	May 11, 2007	Mount Lemmon	Mount Lemmon Survey	·	1.2 km	MPC · JPL
293596	2007 JG_{36}	—	May 10, 2007	Mount Lemmon	Mount Lemmon Survey	·	2.2 km	MPC · JPL
293597	2007 JY_{36}	—	May 9, 2007	Catalina	CSS	V	820 m	MPC · JPL
293598	2007 JE_{37}	—	May 10, 2007	Kitt Peak	Spacewatch	·	1.2 km	MPC · JPL
293599	2007 JT_{38}	—	May 13, 2007	Mount Lemmon	Mount Lemmon Survey	·	2.2 km	MPC · JPL
293600	2007 JV_{40}	—	May 13, 2007	Kitt Peak	Spacewatch	·	4.3 km	MPC · JPL

== 293601–293700 ==
back to top

Designation			Discovery			Properties		Ref
Permanent	Provisional	Named after	Date	Site	Discoverer(s)	Category	Diam.	Ref
293601	2007 JX_{40}	—	May 13, 2007	Kitt Peak	Spacewatch	·	1.6 km	MPC · JPL
293602	2007 JM_{43}	—	May 13, 2007	Črni Vrh	Skvarč, J.	·	2.6 km	MPC · JPL
293603	2007 JP_{43}	—	May 9, 2007	Mount Lemmon	Mount Lemmon Survey	·	5.3 km	MPC · JPL
293604	2007 JX_{43}	—	May 6, 2007	Purple Mountain	PMO NEO Survey Program	·	4.5 km	MPC · JPL
293605	2007 KB	—	May 16, 2007	Wrightwood	J. W. Young	·	800 m	MPC · JPL
293606	2007 KL	—	May 16, 2007	Kitt Peak	Spacewatch	·	1.1 km	MPC · JPL
293607	2007 KT_{2}	—	May 21, 2007	Tiki	S. F. Hönig, Teamo, N.	·	3.5 km	MPC · JPL
293608	2007 KZ_{6}	—	May 23, 2007	Reedy Creek	J. Broughton	·	1.3 km	MPC · JPL
293609	2007 KF_{8}	—	May 17, 2007	Catalina	CSS	·	3.5 km	MPC · JPL
293610	2007 LO_{2}	—	June 8, 2007	Kitt Peak	Spacewatch	·	2.9 km	MPC · JPL
293611	2007 LB_{4}	—	June 8, 2007	Kitt Peak	Spacewatch	·	1.1 km	MPC · JPL
293612	2007 LS_{7}	—	June 8, 2007	Kitt Peak	Spacewatch	·	6.1 km	MPC · JPL
293613	2007 LQ_{8}	—	June 9, 2007	Kitt Peak	Spacewatch	WIT	1.2 km	MPC · JPL
293614	2007 LS_{16}	—	June 10, 2007	Kitt Peak	Spacewatch	·	920 m	MPC · JPL
293615	2007 LF_{17}	—	June 10, 2007	Kitt Peak	Spacewatch	·	740 m	MPC · JPL
293616	2007 LT_{24}	—	June 14, 2007	Kitt Peak	Spacewatch	·	1.5 km	MPC · JPL
293617	2007 LK_{33}	—	June 5, 2007	Catalina	CSS	·	3.4 km	MPC · JPL
293618	2007 LQ_{33}	—	June 12, 2007	Catalina	CSS	·	4.3 km	MPC · JPL
293619	2007 LW_{36}	—	June 12, 2007	Kitt Peak	Spacewatch	·	4.2 km	MPC · JPL
293620	2007 LP_{37}	—	June 15, 2007	Kitt Peak	Spacewatch	fast	3.6 km	MPC · JPL
293621	2007 MA	—	June 16, 2007	Tiki	S. F. Hönig, Teamo, N.	·	990 m	MPC · JPL
293622	2007 MB	—	June 16, 2007	Tiki	S. F. Hönig, Teamo, N.	·	1.2 km	MPC · JPL
293623	2007 MD_{2}	—	June 16, 2007	Kitt Peak	Spacewatch	·	880 m	MPC · JPL
293624	2007 MY_{2}	—	June 16, 2007	Kitt Peak	Spacewatch	·	1.5 km	MPC · JPL
293625	2007 MD_{4}	—	June 17, 2007	Eskridge	G. Hug	·	1.1 km	MPC · JPL
293626	2007 MG_{13}	—	June 22, 2007	Anderson Mesa	LONEOS	·	1.1 km	MPC · JPL
293627	2007 MN_{19}	—	June 21, 2007	Mount Lemmon	Mount Lemmon Survey	·	920 m	MPC · JPL
293628	2007 NE_{1}	—	July 9, 2007	Reedy Creek	J. Broughton	EUN	1.9 km	MPC · JPL
293629	2007 NW_{2}	—	July 14, 2007	Dauban	Chante-Perdrix	·	7.3 km	MPC · JPL
293630	2007 NR_{3}	—	July 10, 2007	Reedy Creek	J. Broughton	·	2.0 km	MPC · JPL
293631	2007 NP_{5}	—	July 15, 2007	Tiki	S. F. Hönig, Teamo, N.	·	1.8 km	MPC · JPL
293632	2007 OR_{2}	—	July 20, 2007	Tiki	S. F. Hönig, Teamo, N.	NYS	1.5 km	MPC · JPL
293633	2007 OT_{3}	—	July 20, 2007	La Sagra	OAM	·	2.2 km	MPC · JPL
293634	2007 OS_{4}	—	July 21, 2007	Lulin	LUSS	·	3.6 km	MPC · JPL
293635	2007 OG_{5}	—	July 22, 2007	Dauban	Chante-Perdrix	·	2.2 km	MPC · JPL
293636	2007 OP_{6}	—	July 21, 2007	Reedy Creek	J. Broughton	NYS	1.9 km	MPC · JPL
293637	2007 OQ_{6}	—	July 21, 2007	Reedy Creek	J. Broughton	·	1.7 km	MPC · JPL
293638	2007 OR_{7}	—	July 26, 2007	Sandlot	G. Hug	MAS	960 m	MPC · JPL
293639	2007 OU_{7}	—	July 25, 2007	Reedy Creek	J. Broughton	·	1.5 km	MPC · JPL
293640	2007 OX_{7}	—	July 27, 2007	Dauban	Chante-Perdrix	·	830 m	MPC · JPL
293641	2007 ON_{9}	—	July 23, 2007	Črni Vrh	Matičič, S.	EUP	7.5 km	MPC · JPL
293642	2007 OS_{9}	—	July 24, 2007	Tiki	Teamo, N.	·	870 m	MPC · JPL
293643	2007 OS_{10}	—	July 18, 2007	Mount Lemmon	Mount Lemmon Survey	PHO	1.1 km	MPC · JPL
293644	2007 OY_{10}	—	July 19, 2007	Mount Lemmon	Mount Lemmon Survey	·	1.9 km	MPC · JPL
293645	2007 PE	—	August 4, 2007	Pla D'Arguines	R. Ferrando	V	890 m	MPC · JPL
293646	2007 PK	—	August 5, 2007	Dauban	Chante-Perdrix	·	1.1 km	MPC · JPL
293647	2007 PU_{2}	—	August 7, 2007	Reedy Creek	J. Broughton	·	2.1 km	MPC · JPL
293648	2007 PX_{2}	—	August 7, 2007	Reedy Creek	J. Broughton	·	780 m	MPC · JPL
293649	2007 PJ_{3}	—	August 6, 2007	Siding Spring	SSS	PHO	1.6 km	MPC · JPL
293650	2007 PV_{6}	—	August 9, 2007	Socorro	LINEAR	NYS	1.5 km	MPC · JPL
293651	2007 PB_{7}	—	August 5, 2007	Socorro	LINEAR	TIR	4.0 km	MPC · JPL
293652	2007 PK_{9}	—	August 12, 2007	Pla D'Arguines	R. Ferrando	·	1.5 km	MPC · JPL
293653	2007 PL_{11}	—	August 9, 2007	Kitt Peak	Spacewatch	·	1.3 km	MPC · JPL
293654	2007 PS_{11}	—	August 12, 2007	Purple Mountain	PMO NEO Survey Program	·	1.7 km	MPC · JPL
293655	2007 PP_{12}	—	August 8, 2007	Socorro	LINEAR	·	2.3 km	MPC · JPL
293656	2007 PN_{13}	—	August 8, 2007	Socorro	LINEAR	·	940 m	MPC · JPL
293657	2007 PD_{14}	—	August 8, 2007	Socorro	LINEAR	ERI	2.0 km	MPC · JPL
293658	2007 PZ_{14}	—	August 8, 2007	Socorro	LINEAR	·	1.9 km	MPC · JPL
293659	2007 PC_{15}	—	August 8, 2007	Socorro	LINEAR	·	1.0 km	MPC · JPL
293660	2007 PD_{15}	—	August 8, 2007	Socorro	LINEAR	ERI	2.3 km	MPC · JPL
293661	2007 PT_{15}	—	August 8, 2007	Socorro	LINEAR	TIR	4.5 km	MPC · JPL
293662	2007 PW_{16}	—	August 8, 2007	Socorro	LINEAR	slow	1.6 km	MPC · JPL
293663	2007 PA_{18}	—	August 9, 2007	Socorro	LINEAR	·	1.9 km	MPC · JPL
293664	2007 PL_{18}	—	August 9, 2007	Socorro	LINEAR	NYS	1.4 km	MPC · JPL
293665	2007 PV_{18}	—	August 9, 2007	Socorro	LINEAR	V	920 m	MPC · JPL
293666	2007 PA_{19}	—	August 9, 2007	Socorro	LINEAR	·	1.5 km	MPC · JPL
293667	2007 PD_{19}	—	August 9, 2007	Socorro	LINEAR	·	850 m	MPC · JPL
293668	2007 PW_{19}	—	August 9, 2007	Kitt Peak	Spacewatch	·	1.7 km	MPC · JPL
293669	2007 PK_{22}	—	August 10, 2007	Kitt Peak	Spacewatch	·	950 m	MPC · JPL
293670	2007 PV_{22}	—	August 11, 2007	Socorro	LINEAR	·	1.6 km	MPC · JPL
293671	2007 PX_{22}	—	August 11, 2007	Socorro	LINEAR	·	960 m	MPC · JPL
293672	2007 PA_{23}	—	August 11, 2007	Socorro	LINEAR	·	2.1 km	MPC · JPL
293673	2007 PH_{24}	—	August 12, 2007	Socorro	LINEAR	V	780 m	MPC · JPL
293674	2007 PC_{25}	—	August 9, 2007	Reedy Creek	J. Broughton	·	940 m	MPC · JPL
293675	2007 PY_{25}	—	August 8, 2007	Socorro	LINEAR	(5)	2.1 km	MPC · JPL
293676	2007 PC_{26}	—	August 10, 2007	Kitt Peak	Spacewatch	·	2.2 km	MPC · JPL
293677	2007 PX_{26}	—	August 7, 2007	Palomar	Palomar	NYS	1.2 km	MPC · JPL
293678	2007 PH_{27}	—	August 10, 2007	Tiki	S. F. Hönig, Teamo, N.	·	1.6 km	MPC · JPL
293679	2007 PO_{28}	—	August 14, 2007	Altschwendt	W. Ries	·	1.8 km	MPC · JPL
293680	2007 PY_{30}	—	August 5, 2007	Socorro	LINEAR	·	6.2 km	MPC · JPL
293681	2007 PX_{31}	—	August 8, 2007	Socorro	LINEAR	·	1.1 km	MPC · JPL
293682	2007 PH_{33}	—	August 10, 2007	Kitt Peak	Spacewatch	·	1.2 km	MPC · JPL
293683	2007 PS_{33}	—	August 12, 2007	Socorro	LINEAR	·	1.7 km	MPC · JPL
293684	2007 PU_{33}	—	August 12, 2007	Socorro	LINEAR	·	7.1 km	MPC · JPL
293685	2007 PW_{33}	—	August 10, 2007	Kitt Peak	Spacewatch	DOR	3.2 km	MPC · JPL
293686	2007 PA_{34}	—	August 12, 2007	Socorro	LINEAR	·	970 m	MPC · JPL
293687	2007 PB_{34}	—	August 12, 2007	Socorro	LINEAR	·	1.4 km	MPC · JPL
293688	2007 PS_{34}	—	August 9, 2007	Socorro	LINEAR	NYS	1.4 km	MPC · JPL
293689	2007 PX_{34}	—	August 9, 2007	Kitt Peak	Spacewatch	·	870 m	MPC · JPL
293690	2007 PB_{35}	—	August 9, 2007	Socorro	LINEAR	·	1.6 km	MPC · JPL
293691	2007 PG_{35}	—	August 9, 2007	Socorro	LINEAR	·	1.4 km	MPC · JPL
293692	2007 PB_{36}	—	August 12, 2007	Purple Mountain	PMO NEO Survey Program	·	680 m	MPC · JPL
293693	2007 PW_{37}	—	August 13, 2007	Socorro	LINEAR	·	890 m	MPC · JPL
293694	2007 PY_{38}	—	August 12, 2007	Bergisch Gladbach	W. Bickel	·	1.1 km	MPC · JPL
293695	2007 PB_{39}	—	August 14, 2007	Bergisch Gladbach	W. Bickel	·	1.8 km	MPC · JPL
293696	2007 PF_{39}	—	August 15, 2007	La Sagra	OAM	·	1.6 km	MPC · JPL
293697	2007 PJ_{40}	—	August 13, 2007	Socorro	LINEAR	·	2.2 km	MPC · JPL
293698	2007 PK_{40}	—	August 13, 2007	Socorro	LINEAR	·	900 m	MPC · JPL
293699	2007 PN_{42}	—	August 14, 2007	La Sagra	OAM	·	2.4 km	MPC · JPL
293700	2007 PP_{42}	—	August 6, 2007	Socorro	LINEAR	·	2.3 km	MPC · JPL

== 293701–293800 ==
back to top

Designation			Discovery			Properties		Ref
Permanent	Provisional	Named after	Date	Site	Discoverer(s)	Category	Diam.	Ref
293701	2007 PK_{43}	—	August 10, 2007	Kitt Peak	Spacewatch	·	780 m	MPC · JPL
293702	2007 PM_{45}	—	August 11, 2007	Siding Spring	SSS	MAR	1.5 km	MPC · JPL
293703	2007 PL_{49}	—	August 9, 2007	Socorro	LINEAR	·	850 m	MPC · JPL
293704	2007 QG	—	August 16, 2007	Bisei SG Center	BATTeRS	·	1.7 km	MPC · JPL
293705	2007 QK	—	August 16, 2007	Great Shefford	Birtwhistle, P.	TIN	1.6 km	MPC · JPL
293706	2007 QK_{1}	—	August 19, 2007	Bisei SG Center	BATTeRS	·	1.7 km	MPC · JPL
293707 Govoradloanatoly	2007 QT_{1}	Govoradloanatoly	August 16, 2007	Andrushivka	Andrushivka	V	770 m	MPC · JPL
293708	2007 QW_{5}	—	August 21, 2007	Anderson Mesa	LONEOS	·	1.8 km	MPC · JPL
293709	2007 QG_{7}	—	August 21, 2007	Anderson Mesa	LONEOS	V	770 m	MPC · JPL
293710	2007 QG_{9}	—	August 22, 2007	Socorro	LINEAR	·	1.2 km	MPC · JPL
293711	2007 QK_{9}	—	August 22, 2007	Socorro	LINEAR	·	770 m	MPC · JPL
293712	2007 QM_{9}	—	August 22, 2007	Socorro	LINEAR	NYS ·	1.7 km	MPC · JPL
293713	2007 QH_{14}	—	August 16, 2007	Purple Mountain	PMO NEO Survey Program	·	2.7 km	MPC · JPL
293714	2007 QZ_{15}	—	August 21, 2007	Anderson Mesa	LONEOS	·	1.1 km	MPC · JPL
293715	2007 QN_{16}	—	August 16, 2007	Purple Mountain	PMO NEO Survey Program	·	1.9 km	MPC · JPL
293716	2007 QD_{17}	—	August 22, 2007	Socorro	LINEAR	·	2.6 km	MPC · JPL
293717	2007 QR_{17}	—	August 24, 2007	Kitt Peak	Spacewatch	·	1.5 km	MPC · JPL
293718	2007 RP	—	September 1, 2007	Siding Spring	K. Sárneczky, L. Kiss	NYS	1.2 km	MPC · JPL
293719	2007 RQ	—	September 1, 2007	Siding Spring	K. Sárneczky, L. Kiss	·	670 m	MPC · JPL
293720	2007 RX_{1}	—	September 1, 2007	Siding Spring	K. Sárneczky, L. Kiss	·	2.9 km	MPC · JPL
293721	2007 RT_{4}	—	September 3, 2007	Catalina	CSS	·	2.2 km	MPC · JPL
293722	2007 RN_{5}	—	September 3, 2007	La Sagra	OAM	MAS	900 m	MPC · JPL
293723	2007 RT_{13}	—	September 11, 2007	Eskridge	G. Hug	·	850 m	MPC · JPL
293724	2007 RJ_{15}	—	September 12, 2007	Front Royal	Skillman, D. R.	·	1.1 km	MPC · JPL
293725	2007 RS_{16}	—	September 12, 2007	Goodricke-Pigott	R. A. Tucker	·	1.7 km	MPC · JPL
293726	2007 RQ_{17}	—	September 13, 2007	Mount Lemmon	Mount Lemmon Survey	APO	110 m	MPC · JPL
293727	2007 RZ_{17}	—	September 12, 2007	Bisei SG Center	BATTeRS	·	970 m	MPC · JPL
293728	2007 RT_{20}	—	September 3, 2007	Catalina	CSS	·	790 m	MPC · JPL
293729	2007 RU_{22}	—	September 3, 2007	Catalina	CSS	·	1.4 km	MPC · JPL
293730	2007 RV_{26}	—	September 4, 2007	Mount Lemmon	Mount Lemmon Survey	·	1.6 km	MPC · JPL
293731	2007 RJ_{27}	—	September 4, 2007	Mount Lemmon	Mount Lemmon Survey	·	740 m	MPC · JPL
293732	2007 RL_{28}	—	September 4, 2007	Catalina	CSS	·	750 m	MPC · JPL
293733	2007 RY_{29}	—	September 5, 2007	Mount Lemmon	Mount Lemmon Survey	EUN	1.7 km	MPC · JPL
293734	2007 RR_{30}	—	September 5, 2007	Catalina	CSS	·	1.0 km	MPC · JPL
293735	2007 RB_{32}	—	September 5, 2007	Catalina	CSS	·	970 m	MPC · JPL
293736	2007 RY_{33}	—	September 5, 2007	Mount Lemmon	Mount Lemmon Survey	·	2.4 km	MPC · JPL
293737	2007 RV_{36}	—	September 8, 2007	Anderson Mesa	LONEOS	·	2.3 km	MPC · JPL
293738	2007 RB_{37}	—	September 8, 2007	Anderson Mesa	LONEOS	NYS	1.6 km	MPC · JPL
293739	2007 RE_{37}	—	September 8, 2007	Anderson Mesa	LONEOS	·	1.4 km	MPC · JPL
293740	2007 RQ_{38}	—	September 8, 2007	Anderson Mesa	LONEOS	·	1.7 km	MPC · JPL
293741	2007 RE_{40}	—	September 9, 2007	Kitt Peak	Spacewatch	·	1.8 km	MPC · JPL
293742	2007 RB_{44}	—	September 9, 2007	Kitt Peak	Spacewatch	·	2.8 km	MPC · JPL
293743	2007 RL_{45}	—	September 9, 2007	Kitt Peak	Spacewatch	V	930 m	MPC · JPL
293744	2007 RP_{45}	—	September 9, 2007	Kitt Peak	Spacewatch	·	1.6 km	MPC · JPL
293745	2007 RM_{46}	—	September 9, 2007	Kitt Peak	Spacewatch	·	2.0 km	MPC · JPL
293746	2007 RQ_{49}	—	September 9, 2007	Mount Lemmon	Mount Lemmon Survey	·	820 m	MPC · JPL
293747	2007 RF_{52}	—	September 9, 2007	Kitt Peak	Spacewatch	·	1.6 km	MPC · JPL
293748	2007 RO_{54}	—	September 9, 2007	Kitt Peak	Spacewatch	·	2.6 km	MPC · JPL
293749	2007 RE_{56}	—	September 9, 2007	Kitt Peak	Spacewatch	·	1.8 km	MPC · JPL
293750	2007 RS_{57}	—	September 9, 2007	Mount Lemmon	Mount Lemmon Survey	·	910 m	MPC · JPL
293751	2007 RK_{58}	—	September 9, 2007	Mount Lemmon	Mount Lemmon Survey	·	1.5 km	MPC · JPL
293752	2007 RJ_{69}	—	September 10, 2007	Kitt Peak	Spacewatch	·	1.7 km	MPC · JPL
293753	2007 RA_{81}	—	September 10, 2007	Catalina	CSS	PHO	3.2 km	MPC · JPL
293754	2007 RR_{83}	—	September 10, 2007	Mount Lemmon	Mount Lemmon Survey	·	1.6 km	MPC · JPL
293755	2007 RU_{83}	—	September 10, 2007	Mount Lemmon	Mount Lemmon Survey	·	1.3 km	MPC · JPL
293756	2007 RN_{85}	—	September 10, 2007	Mount Lemmon	Mount Lemmon Survey	·	1.4 km	MPC · JPL
293757	2007 RS_{88}	—	September 10, 2007	Mount Lemmon	Mount Lemmon Survey	MAS	820 m	MPC · JPL
293758	2007 RY_{89}	—	September 10, 2007	Mount Lemmon	Mount Lemmon Survey	·	700 m	MPC · JPL
293759	2007 RX_{90}	—	September 10, 2007	Mount Lemmon	Mount Lemmon Survey	·	1.3 km	MPC · JPL
293760	2007 RJ_{91}	—	September 10, 2007	Mount Lemmon	Mount Lemmon Survey	·	1.1 km	MPC · JPL
293761	2007 RX_{91}	—	September 10, 2007	Mount Lemmon	Mount Lemmon Survey	·	1.4 km	MPC · JPL
293762	2007 RP_{92}	—	September 10, 2007	Mount Lemmon	Mount Lemmon Survey	·	850 m	MPC · JPL
293763	2007 RE_{95}	—	September 10, 2007	Kitt Peak	Spacewatch	·	1.2 km	MPC · JPL
293764	2007 RP_{95}	—	September 10, 2007	Kitt Peak	Spacewatch	AGN	1.4 km	MPC · JPL
293765	2007 RT_{95}	—	September 10, 2007	Kitt Peak	Spacewatch	·	1.5 km	MPC · JPL
293766	2007 RC_{96}	—	September 10, 2007	Kitt Peak	Spacewatch	·	1.5 km	MPC · JPL
293767	2007 RG_{96}	—	September 10, 2007	Kitt Peak	Spacewatch	·	1.7 km	MPC · JPL
293768	2007 RH_{97}	—	September 10, 2007	Kitt Peak	Spacewatch	·	1.7 km	MPC · JPL
293769	2007 RG_{98}	—	September 10, 2007	Kitt Peak	Spacewatch	·	2.3 km	MPC · JPL
293770	2007 RC_{103}	—	September 11, 2007	Catalina	CSS	NYS	1.3 km	MPC · JPL
293771	2007 RO_{103}	—	September 11, 2007	Catalina	CSS	·	1.3 km	MPC · JPL
293772	2007 RX_{103}	—	September 11, 2007	Catalina	CSS	NYS	1.4 km	MPC · JPL
293773	2007 RN_{104}	—	September 11, 2007	Mount Lemmon	Mount Lemmon Survey	THM	3.0 km	MPC · JPL
293774	2007 RB_{110}	—	September 11, 2007	Mount Lemmon	Mount Lemmon Survey	·	1.1 km	MPC · JPL
293775	2007 RX_{111}	—	September 11, 2007	Kitt Peak	Spacewatch	V	860 m	MPC · JPL
293776	2007 RJ_{116}	—	September 11, 2007	Kitt Peak	Spacewatch	·	950 m	MPC · JPL
293777	2007 RR_{117}	—	September 11, 2007	Kitt Peak	Spacewatch	·	1.8 km	MPC · JPL
293778	2007 RA_{118}	—	September 11, 2007	Kitt Peak	Spacewatch	EUN	1.2 km	MPC · JPL
293779	2007 RU_{119}	—	September 11, 2007	Purple Mountain	PMO NEO Survey Program	BRA	1.9 km	MPC · JPL
293780	2007 RQ_{123}	—	September 12, 2007	Mount Lemmon	Mount Lemmon Survey	·	2.1 km	MPC · JPL
293781	2007 RA_{124}	—	September 12, 2007	Catalina	CSS	·	780 m	MPC · JPL
293782	2007 RY_{125}	—	September 12, 2007	Mount Lemmon	Mount Lemmon Survey	·	1.7 km	MPC · JPL
293783	2007 RA_{126}	—	September 12, 2007	Catalina	CSS	·	1.5 km	MPC · JPL
293784	2007 RY_{126}	—	September 12, 2007	Mount Lemmon	Mount Lemmon Survey	·	2.3 km	MPC · JPL
293785	2007 RF_{130}	—	September 12, 2007	Mount Lemmon	Mount Lemmon Survey	·	1.1 km	MPC · JPL
293786	2007 RZ_{131}	—	September 12, 2007	Mount Lemmon	Mount Lemmon Survey	NYS	1.3 km	MPC · JPL
293787 Mucunbo	2007 RB_{134}	Mucunbo	September 11, 2007	Purple Mountain	PMO NEO Survey Program	NYS	2.3 km	MPC · JPL
293788	2007 RN_{134}	—	September 12, 2007	Catalina	CSS	·	820 m	MPC · JPL
293789	2007 RK_{136}	—	September 14, 2007	Mount Lemmon	Mount Lemmon Survey	AGN	1.2 km	MPC · JPL
293790	2007 RM_{137}	—	September 14, 2007	Mount Lemmon	Mount Lemmon Survey	MAS	1.1 km	MPC · JPL
293791	2007 RJ_{139}	—	September 7, 2007	Socorro	LINEAR	·	1.2 km	MPC · JPL
293792	2007 RS_{139}	—	September 13, 2007	Socorro	LINEAR	·	1.6 km	MPC · JPL
293793	2007 RA_{140}	—	September 13, 2007	Socorro	LINEAR	NYS	1.4 km	MPC · JPL
293794	2007 RO_{140}	—	September 13, 2007	Socorro	LINEAR	·	820 m	MPC · JPL
293795	2007 RH_{141}	—	September 13, 2007	Socorro	LINEAR	·	1.4 km	MPC · JPL
293796	2007 RY_{141}	—	September 13, 2007	Socorro	LINEAR	(1547)	2.6 km	MPC · JPL
293797	2007 RP_{142}	—	September 13, 2007	Socorro	LINEAR	·	1.8 km	MPC · JPL
293798	2007 RY_{143}	—	September 14, 2007	Socorro	LINEAR	·	1.7 km	MPC · JPL
293799	2007 RL_{146}	—	September 15, 2007	Socorro	LINEAR	·	960 m	MPC · JPL
293800	2007 RY_{147}	—	September 11, 2007	Purple Mountain	PMO NEO Survey Program	·	1.3 km	MPC · JPL

== 293801–293900 ==
back to top

Designation			Discovery			Properties		Ref
Permanent	Provisional	Named after	Date	Site	Discoverer(s)	Category	Diam.	Ref
293801	2007 RG_{148}	—	September 11, 2007	Purple Mountain	PMO NEO Survey Program	·	1.7 km	MPC · JPL
293802	2007 RO_{148}	—	September 12, 2007	Catalina	CSS	·	1.2 km	MPC · JPL
293803	2007 RU_{152}	—	September 10, 2007	Kitt Peak	Spacewatch	·	3.9 km	MPC · JPL
293804	2007 RZ_{153}	—	September 10, 2007	Kitt Peak	Spacewatch	·	790 m	MPC · JPL
293805	2007 RL_{154}	—	September 10, 2007	Catalina	CSS	·	3.2 km	MPC · JPL
293806	2007 RO_{154}	—	September 10, 2007	Catalina	CSS	·	1.1 km	MPC · JPL
293807	2007 RD_{159}	—	September 12, 2007	Mount Lemmon	Mount Lemmon Survey	MAS	940 m	MPC · JPL
293808	2007 RK_{161}	—	September 13, 2007	Anderson Mesa	LONEOS	·	1.6 km	MPC · JPL
293809 Zugspitze	2007 RD_{162}	Zugspitze	September 15, 2007	Taunus	Karge, S., R. Kling	·	2.0 km	MPC · JPL
293810	2007 RN_{162}	—	September 10, 2007	Kitt Peak	Spacewatch	·	1.8 km	MPC · JPL
293811	2007 RU_{163}	—	September 10, 2007	Kitt Peak	Spacewatch	·	1.2 km	MPC · JPL
293812	2007 RJ_{164}	—	September 10, 2007	Kitt Peak	Spacewatch	·	660 m	MPC · JPL
293813	2007 RO_{166}	—	September 10, 2007	Kitt Peak	Spacewatch	·	3.5 km	MPC · JPL
293814	2007 RU_{167}	—	September 10, 2007	Kitt Peak	Spacewatch	·	2.9 km	MPC · JPL
293815	2007 RN_{172}	—	September 10, 2007	Kitt Peak	Spacewatch	·	2.4 km	MPC · JPL
293816	2007 RJ_{173}	—	September 10, 2007	Kitt Peak	Spacewatch	·	1.4 km	MPC · JPL
293817	2007 RR_{174}	—	September 10, 2007	Kitt Peak	Spacewatch	·	1.3 km	MPC · JPL
293818	2007 RT_{179}	—	September 10, 2007	Mount Lemmon	Mount Lemmon Survey	·	1.2 km	MPC · JPL
293819	2007 RH_{180}	—	September 11, 2007	Catalina	CSS	·	2.2 km	MPC · JPL
293820	2007 RF_{186}	—	September 13, 2007	Kitt Peak	Spacewatch	·	2.4 km	MPC · JPL
293821	2007 RD_{188}	—	September 8, 2007	Dauban	Chante-Perdrix	·	1.9 km	MPC · JPL
293822	2007 RC_{191}	—	September 11, 2007	Kitt Peak	Spacewatch	NYS	1.3 km	MPC · JPL
293823	2007 RY_{192}	—	September 12, 2007	Kitt Peak	Spacewatch	·	4.8 km	MPC · JPL
293824	2007 RH_{194}	—	September 12, 2007	Kitt Peak	Spacewatch	·	1.9 km	MPC · JPL
293825	2007 RH_{202}	—	September 13, 2007	Kitt Peak	Spacewatch	NYS	1.2 km	MPC · JPL
293826	2007 RT_{203}	—	September 13, 2007	Kitt Peak	Spacewatch	·	1.1 km	MPC · JPL
293827	2007 RW_{203}	—	September 8, 2007	Anderson Mesa	LONEOS	EUN	1.4 km	MPC · JPL
293828	2007 RB_{204}	—	September 9, 2007	Kitt Peak	Spacewatch	EOS	2.5 km	MPC · JPL
293829	2007 RC_{204}	—	September 9, 2007	Kitt Peak	Spacewatch	·	1.0 km	MPC · JPL
293830	2007 RQ_{204}	—	September 9, 2007	Kitt Peak	Spacewatch	·	1.5 km	MPC · JPL
293831	2007 RG_{205}	—	September 9, 2007	Kitt Peak	Spacewatch	·	3.3 km	MPC · JPL
293832	2007 RT_{205}	—	September 10, 2007	Kitt Peak	Spacewatch	V	940 m	MPC · JPL
293833	2007 RW_{205}	—	September 10, 2007	Kitt Peak	Spacewatch	·	910 m	MPC · JPL
293834	2007 RM_{206}	—	September 10, 2007	Kitt Peak	Spacewatch	·	2.2 km	MPC · JPL
293835	2007 RO_{206}	—	September 10, 2007	Kitt Peak	Spacewatch	EMA	4.5 km	MPC · JPL
293836	2007 RQ_{206}	—	September 10, 2007	Kitt Peak	Spacewatch	·	1.9 km	MPC · JPL
293837	2007 RW_{208}	—	September 10, 2007	Kitt Peak	Spacewatch	·	2.6 km	MPC · JPL
293838	2007 RV_{210}	—	September 11, 2007	Kitt Peak	Spacewatch	·	3.0 km	MPC · JPL
293839	2007 RD_{212}	—	September 11, 2007	Kitt Peak	Spacewatch	·	1.8 km	MPC · JPL
293840	2007 RO_{213}	—	September 12, 2007	Mount Lemmon	Mount Lemmon Survey	·	1.9 km	MPC · JPL
293841	2007 RO_{216}	—	September 13, 2007	Catalina	CSS	·	3.4 km	MPC · JPL
293842	2007 RT_{216}	—	September 13, 2007	Catalina	CSS	·	1.6 km	MPC · JPL
293843	2007 RZ_{216}	—	September 13, 2007	Anderson Mesa	LONEOS	·	800 m	MPC · JPL
293844	2007 RF_{217}	—	September 13, 2007	Mount Lemmon	Mount Lemmon Survey	·	1.3 km	MPC · JPL
293845	2007 RQ_{225}	—	September 10, 2007	Kitt Peak	Spacewatch	·	2.4 km	MPC · JPL
293846	2007 RE_{227}	—	September 10, 2007	Kitt Peak	Spacewatch	·	1.2 km	MPC · JPL
293847	2007 RD_{228}	—	September 10, 2007	Mount Lemmon	Mount Lemmon Survey	LEO	2.2 km	MPC · JPL
293848	2007 RY_{228}	—	September 11, 2007	Kitt Peak	Spacewatch	·	1.2 km	MPC · JPL
293849	2007 RA_{231}	—	September 11, 2007	Kitt Peak	Spacewatch	·	790 m	MPC · JPL
293850	2007 RN_{233}	—	September 12, 2007	Catalina	CSS	DOR	2.7 km	MPC · JPL
293851	2007 RX_{234}	—	September 12, 2007	Mount Lemmon	Mount Lemmon Survey	·	1.0 km	MPC · JPL
293852	2007 RQ_{236}	—	September 13, 2007	Mount Lemmon	Mount Lemmon Survey	(2076)	880 m	MPC · JPL
293853	2007 RU_{236}	—	September 13, 2007	Mount Lemmon	Mount Lemmon Survey	·	2.4 km	MPC · JPL
293854	2007 RU_{238}	—	September 14, 2007	Catalina	CSS	·	880 m	MPC · JPL
293855	2007 RC_{239}	—	September 14, 2007	Anderson Mesa	LONEOS	NYS	1.7 km	MPC · JPL
293856	2007 RY_{241}	—	September 22, 2003	Palomar	NEAT	·	1.5 km	MPC · JPL
293857	2007 RN_{242}	—	September 15, 2007	Socorro	LINEAR	·	1.7 km	MPC · JPL
293858	2007 RA_{243}	—	September 15, 2007	Socorro	LINEAR	H	680 m	MPC · JPL
293859	2007 RG_{243}	—	September 15, 2007	Socorro	LINEAR	·	1.5 km	MPC · JPL
293860	2007 RD_{244}	—	September 15, 2007	Socorro	LINEAR	·	1.6 km	MPC · JPL
293861	2007 RN_{244}	—	September 11, 2007	Kitt Peak	Spacewatch	·	1.1 km	MPC · JPL
293862	2007 RE_{245}	—	September 11, 2007	Kitt Peak	Spacewatch	·	1.6 km	MPC · JPL
293863	2007 RR_{245}	—	September 12, 2007	Catalina	CSS	·	2.8 km	MPC · JPL
293864	2007 RY_{246}	—	September 12, 2007	Catalina	CSS	·	2.8 km	MPC · JPL
293865	2007 RM_{249}	—	September 13, 2007	Catalina	CSS	EUN	1.2 km	MPC · JPL
293866	2007 RJ_{252}	—	September 13, 2007	Catalina	CSS	EUN	1.9 km	MPC · JPL
293867	2007 RJ_{253}	—	September 13, 2007	Mount Lemmon	Mount Lemmon Survey	·	750 m	MPC · JPL
293868	2007 RD_{259}	—	September 14, 2007	Mount Lemmon	Mount Lemmon Survey	·	1.6 km	MPC · JPL
293869	2007 RL_{260}	—	September 14, 2007	Mount Lemmon	Mount Lemmon Survey	·	780 m	MPC · JPL
293870	2007 RN_{260}	—	September 14, 2007	Mount Lemmon	Mount Lemmon Survey	·	1.5 km	MPC · JPL
293871	2007 RV_{262}	—	September 15, 2007	Kitt Peak	Spacewatch	AGN	1.4 km	MPC · JPL
293872	2007 RF_{265}	—	September 15, 2007	Mount Lemmon	Mount Lemmon Survey	·	1.9 km	MPC · JPL
293873	2007 RG_{265}	—	September 15, 2007	Mount Lemmon	Mount Lemmon Survey	·	1.1 km	MPC · JPL
293874	2007 RT_{267}	—	September 15, 2007	Kitt Peak	Spacewatch	·	1.6 km	MPC · JPL
293875	2007 RZ_{270}	—	September 15, 2007	Kitt Peak	Spacewatch	·	810 m	MPC · JPL
293876	2007 RM_{271}	—	September 15, 2007	Mount Lemmon	Mount Lemmon Survey	·	3.6 km	MPC · JPL
293877	2007 RL_{272}	—	September 15, 2007	Kitt Peak	Spacewatch	·	1.5 km	MPC · JPL
293878 Tapping	2007 RV_{274}	Tapping	September 9, 2007	Mauna Kea	D. D. Balam	·	1.2 km	MPC · JPL
293879	2007 RA_{278}	—	September 5, 2007	Catalina	CSS	PHO · slow	2.1 km	MPC · JPL
293880	2007 RZ_{283}	—	September 9, 2007	Mount Lemmon	Mount Lemmon Survey	JUN	930 m	MPC · JPL
293881	2007 RH_{285}	—	September 13, 2007	Mount Lemmon	Mount Lemmon Survey	·	1.4 km	MPC · JPL
293882	2007 RP_{285}	—	September 14, 2007	Mount Lemmon	Mount Lemmon Survey	EOS	2.1 km	MPC · JPL
293883	2007 RS_{285}	—	September 14, 2007	Mount Lemmon	Mount Lemmon Survey	·	1.6 km	MPC · JPL
293884	2007 RT_{285}	—	September 14, 2007	Mount Lemmon	Mount Lemmon Survey	·	3.3 km	MPC · JPL
293885	2007 RV_{285}	—	September 14, 2007	Mount Lemmon	Mount Lemmon Survey	·	3.5 km	MPC · JPL
293886	2007 RR_{286}	—	September 4, 2007	Mount Lemmon	Mount Lemmon Survey	·	2.9 km	MPC · JPL
293887	2007 RH_{290}	—	September 10, 2007	Mount Lemmon	Mount Lemmon Survey	MAR	1.7 km	MPC · JPL
293888	2007 RR_{290}	—	September 10, 2007	Mount Lemmon	Mount Lemmon Survey	·	1.4 km	MPC · JPL
293889	2007 RR_{292}	—	September 12, 2007	Mount Lemmon	Mount Lemmon Survey	AST	1.5 km	MPC · JPL
293890	2007 RK_{293}	—	September 13, 2007	Mount Lemmon	Mount Lemmon Survey	·	2.2 km	MPC · JPL
293891	2007 RK_{294}	—	September 13, 2007	Mount Lemmon	Mount Lemmon Survey	KOR	1.5 km	MPC · JPL
293892	2007 RO_{296}	—	September 3, 2007	Catalina	CSS	·	760 m	MPC · JPL
293893	2007 RO_{297}	—	September 11, 2007	Kitt Peak	Spacewatch	·	1.3 km	MPC · JPL
293894	2007 RU_{297}	—	September 3, 2007	Catalina	CSS	·	2.4 km	MPC · JPL
293895	2007 RS_{298}	—	September 10, 2007	Mount Lemmon	Mount Lemmon Survey	·	560 m	MPC · JPL
293896	2007 RH_{299}	—	September 15, 2007	Kitt Peak	Spacewatch	·	1.8 km	MPC · JPL
293897	2007 RZ_{300}	—	September 12, 2007	Mount Lemmon	Mount Lemmon Survey	·	1.6 km	MPC · JPL
293898	2007 RC_{301}	—	September 12, 2007	Kitt Peak	Spacewatch	·	3.5 km	MPC · JPL
293899	2007 RR_{302}	—	September 10, 2007	Kitt Peak	Spacewatch	·	690 m	MPC · JPL
293900	2007 RT_{302}	—	September 12, 2007	Catalina	CSS	·	5.2 km	MPC · JPL

== 293901–294000 ==
back to top

Designation			Discovery			Properties		Ref
Permanent	Provisional	Named after	Date	Site	Discoverer(s)	Category	Diam.	Ref
293901	2007 RX_{302}	—	September 13, 2007	Mount Lemmon	Mount Lemmon Survey	·	3.5 km	MPC · JPL
293902	2007 RG_{309}	—	September 10, 2007	Kitt Peak	Spacewatch	·	670 m	MPC · JPL
293903	2007 RB_{314}	—	September 13, 2007	Catalina	CSS	·	2.2 km	MPC · JPL
293904	2007 RH_{314}	—	September 14, 2007	Mount Lemmon	Mount Lemmon Survey	·	870 m	MPC · JPL
293905	2007 RJ_{314}	—	September 15, 2007	Catalina	CSS	MAR	1.4 km	MPC · JPL
293906	2007 RO_{317}	—	September 10, 2007	Mount Lemmon	Mount Lemmon Survey	·	1.9 km	MPC · JPL
293907	2007 RU_{317}	—	September 13, 2007	Catalina	CSS	H	720 m	MPC · JPL
293908	2007 SP	—	September 18, 2007	Mayhill	Lowe, A.	·	6.0 km	MPC · JPL
293909 Matterhorn	2007 SS_{2}	Matterhorn	September 16, 2007	Taunus	Karge, S., R. Kling	·	2.9 km	MPC · JPL
293910	2007 SX_{4}	—	September 18, 2007	Socorro	LINEAR	·	2.0 km	MPC · JPL
293911	2007 SK_{5}	—	September 18, 2007	Socorro	LINEAR	·	2.2 km	MPC · JPL
293912	2007 SC_{6}	—	September 21, 2007	Socorro	LINEAR	·	1.1 km	MPC · JPL
293913	2007 SP_{8}	—	September 18, 2007	Kitt Peak	Spacewatch	MAS	900 m	MPC · JPL
293914	2007 SH_{10}	—	September 19, 2007	Kitt Peak	Spacewatch	(12739)	2.0 km	MPC · JPL
293915	2007 SK_{11}	—	September 20, 2007	Catalina	CSS	EUN	2.3 km	MPC · JPL
293916	2007 SQ_{13}	—	September 19, 2007	Kitt Peak	Spacewatch	·	1.9 km	MPC · JPL
293917	2007 SU_{13}	—	September 19, 2007	Kitt Peak	Spacewatch	·	2.3 km	MPC · JPL
293918	2007 SL_{14}	—	September 20, 2007	Kitt Peak	Spacewatch	(5)	1.0 km	MPC · JPL
293919	2007 SP_{15}	—	September 30, 2007	Kitt Peak	Spacewatch	·	5.1 km	MPC · JPL
293920	2007 SE_{16}	—	September 30, 2007	Kitt Peak	Spacewatch	·	1.1 km	MPC · JPL
293921	2007 SL_{16}	—	September 30, 2007	Kitt Peak	Spacewatch	·	1.2 km	MPC · JPL
293922	2007 SR_{18}	—	September 20, 2007	Kitt Peak	Spacewatch	·	2.1 km	MPC · JPL
293923	2007 SR_{22}	—	September 19, 2007	Socorro	LINEAR	·	1.8 km	MPC · JPL
293924	2007 SX_{22}	—	September 21, 2007	Socorro	LINEAR	·	1.6 km	MPC · JPL
293925	2007 SF_{23}	—	September 25, 2007	Mount Lemmon	Mount Lemmon Survey	V	870 m	MPC · JPL
293926 Harrystine	2007 TJ_{1}	Harrystine	October 2, 2007	Charleston	Astronomical Research Observatory	·	1.0 km	MPC · JPL
293927	2007 TR_{1}	—	October 4, 2007	Mount Lemmon	Mount Lemmon Survey	·	1.2 km	MPC · JPL
293928	2007 TF_{2}	—	October 4, 2007	Kitt Peak	Spacewatch	·	1.6 km	MPC · JPL
293929	2007 TB_{4}	—	October 6, 2007	Pla D'Arguines	R. Ferrando	·	2.3 km	MPC · JPL
293930	2007 TQ_{4}	—	October 6, 2007	7300	W. K. Y. Yeung	EUN	3.3 km	MPC · JPL
293931	2007 TU_{5}	—	October 6, 2007	Socorro	LINEAR	NYS ·	1.9 km	MPC · JPL
293932	2007 TO_{6}	—	October 6, 2007	Dauban	Chante-Perdrix	·	2.6 km	MPC · JPL
293933	2007 TX_{6}	—	October 6, 2007	La Sagra	OAM	EOS	2.4 km	MPC · JPL
293934 MPIA	2007 TM_{8}	MPIA	October 8, 2007	Heidelberg	F. Hormuth	·	1.4 km	MPC · JPL
293935	2007 TL_{9}	—	October 6, 2007	Socorro	LINEAR	·	1.8 km	MPC · JPL
293936	2007 TM_{11}	—	October 6, 2007	Socorro	LINEAR	·	2.2 km	MPC · JPL
293937	2007 TG_{12}	—	October 6, 2007	Socorro	LINEAR	·	1.3 km	MPC · JPL
293938	2007 TM_{12}	—	October 6, 2007	Socorro	LINEAR	·	2.1 km	MPC · JPL
293939	2007 TT_{12}	—	October 6, 2007	Socorro	LINEAR	·	1.7 km	MPC · JPL
293940	2007 TX_{12}	—	October 6, 2007	Socorro	LINEAR	·	1.0 km	MPC · JPL
293941	2007 TU_{13}	—	October 7, 2007	Socorro	LINEAR	·	1.2 km	MPC · JPL
293942	2007 TS_{15}	—	October 4, 2007	Kitt Peak	Spacewatch	·	2.0 km	MPC · JPL
293943	2007 TK_{16}	—	October 8, 2007	Črni Vrh	Matičič, S.	·	2.4 km	MPC · JPL
293944	2007 TQ_{18}	—	October 9, 2007	Eskridge	G. Hug	·	1.2 km	MPC · JPL
293945	2007 TB_{20}	—	October 6, 2007	Socorro	LINEAR	·	2.4 km	MPC · JPL
293946	2007 TE_{20}	—	October 6, 2007	Socorro	LINEAR	JUN	1.4 km	MPC · JPL
293947	2007 TO_{23}	—	October 10, 2007	Mount Lemmon	Mount Lemmon Survey	EUP	8.5 km	MPC · JPL
293948	2007 TF_{24}	—	October 7, 2007	Catalina	CSS	·	2.5 km	MPC · JPL
293949	2007 TG_{27}	—	October 4, 2007	Kitt Peak	Spacewatch	·	2.6 km	MPC · JPL
293950	2007 TU_{28}	—	October 4, 2007	Kitt Peak	Spacewatch	·	1.5 km	MPC · JPL
293951	2007 TX_{28}	—	October 4, 2007	Kitt Peak	Spacewatch	·	2.1 km	MPC · JPL
293952	2007 TX_{29}	—	October 4, 2007	Kitt Peak	Spacewatch	HOF	3.1 km	MPC · JPL
293953	2007 TR_{30}	—	October 4, 2007	Kitt Peak	Spacewatch	·	1.9 km	MPC · JPL
293954	2007 TG_{32}	—	October 6, 2007	Kitt Peak	Spacewatch	·	750 m	MPC · JPL
293955	2007 TM_{33}	—	October 6, 2007	Kitt Peak	Spacewatch	·	1.7 km	MPC · JPL
293956	2007 TL_{35}	—	October 7, 2007	Catalina	CSS	·	800 m	MPC · JPL
293957	2007 TN_{35}	—	October 7, 2007	Catalina	CSS	·	2.5 km	MPC · JPL
293958	2007 TS_{35}	—	October 7, 2007	Catalina	CSS	EUN	1.7 km	MPC · JPL
293959	2007 TG_{40}	—	October 6, 2007	Kitt Peak	Spacewatch	·	1.3 km	MPC · JPL
293960	2007 TN_{41}	—	October 6, 2007	Kitt Peak	Spacewatch	PAD	1.8 km	MPC · JPL
293961	2007 TR_{41}	—	October 6, 2007	Kitt Peak	Spacewatch	·	1.8 km	MPC · JPL
293962	2007 TY_{43}	—	October 7, 2007	Mount Lemmon	Mount Lemmon Survey	·	1.2 km	MPC · JPL
293963	2007 TC_{44}	—	October 7, 2007	Kitt Peak	Spacewatch	WIT	1.5 km	MPC · JPL
293964	2007 TV_{44}	—	October 7, 2007	Catalina	CSS	·	2.1 km	MPC · JPL
293965	2007 TG_{45}	—	October 7, 2007	Catalina	CSS	·	1.7 km	MPC · JPL
293966	2007 TT_{45}	—	October 7, 2007	Catalina	CSS	·	2.1 km	MPC · JPL
293967	2007 TU_{45}	—	October 7, 2007	Catalina	CSS	GEF	1.7 km	MPC · JPL
293968	2007 TD_{51}	—	October 4, 2007	Kitt Peak	Spacewatch	·	2.0 km	MPC · JPL
293969	2007 TV_{51}	—	October 4, 2007	Kitt Peak	Spacewatch	·	1.7 km	MPC · JPL
293970	2007 TC_{52}	—	October 4, 2007	Kitt Peak	Spacewatch	·	2.0 km	MPC · JPL
293971	2007 TB_{53}	—	October 4, 2007	Kitt Peak	Spacewatch	·	1.6 km	MPC · JPL
293972	2007 TJ_{53}	—	October 4, 2007	Kitt Peak	Spacewatch	NYS	1.0 km	MPC · JPL
293973	2007 TB_{54}	—	October 4, 2007	Kitt Peak	Spacewatch	·	2.4 km	MPC · JPL
293974	2007 TH_{55}	—	October 4, 2007	Kitt Peak	Spacewatch	·	1.6 km	MPC · JPL
293975	2007 TH_{57}	—	October 4, 2007	Kitt Peak	Spacewatch	·	1.5 km	MPC · JPL
293976	2007 TS_{57}	—	October 4, 2007	Kitt Peak	Spacewatch	·	1.5 km	MPC · JPL
293977	2007 TX_{58}	—	October 5, 2007	Kitt Peak	Spacewatch	·	2.3 km	MPC · JPL
293978	2007 TD_{59}	—	October 5, 2007	Kitt Peak	Spacewatch	·	1.3 km	MPC · JPL
293979	2007 TY_{60}	—	October 6, 2007	Kitt Peak	Spacewatch	·	1.2 km	MPC · JPL
293980	2007 TC_{63}	—	October 7, 2007	Mount Lemmon	Mount Lemmon Survey	EOS	1.9 km	MPC · JPL
293981	2007 TL_{63}	—	October 7, 2007	Mount Lemmon	Mount Lemmon Survey	·	1.7 km	MPC · JPL
293982	2007 TB_{64}	—	October 7, 2007	Mount Lemmon	Mount Lemmon Survey	·	780 m	MPC · JPL
293983	2007 TG_{66}	—	October 6, 2007	Bisei SG Center	BATTeRS	·	1.5 km	MPC · JPL
293984	2007 TC_{67}	—	October 12, 2007	Dauban	Chante-Perdrix	KOR	1.3 km	MPC · JPL
293985 Franquin	2007 TF_{69}	Franquin	October 13, 2007	Saint-Sulpice	B. Christophe	·	1.4 km	MPC · JPL
293986	2007 TG_{69}	—	October 13, 2007	Altschwendt	W. Ries	·	4.0 km	MPC · JPL
293987	2007 TF_{70}	—	October 10, 2007	Mount Lemmon	Mount Lemmon Survey	·	2.3 km	MPC · JPL
293988	2007 TX_{73}	—	October 13, 2007	7300	W. K. Y. Yeung	·	2.4 km	MPC · JPL
293989	2007 TT_{74}	—	October 15, 2007	Bisei SG Center	BATTeRS	·	2.4 km	MPC · JPL
293990	2007 TZ_{74}	—	October 15, 2007	Bisei SG Center	BATTeRS	RAF	840 m	MPC · JPL
293991	2007 TM_{78}	—	October 5, 2007	Kitt Peak	Spacewatch	·	810 m	MPC · JPL
293992	2007 TT_{78}	—	October 5, 2007	Kitt Peak	Spacewatch	·	890 m	MPC · JPL
293993	2007 TK_{79}	—	October 5, 2007	Kitt Peak	Spacewatch	·	1.9 km	MPC · JPL
293994	2007 TX_{79}	—	October 7, 2007	Mount Lemmon	Mount Lemmon Survey	MAR	1.6 km	MPC · JPL
293995	2007 TT_{80}	—	October 7, 2007	Mount Lemmon	Mount Lemmon Survey	KOR	1.6 km	MPC · JPL
293996	2007 TU_{81}	—	October 7, 2007	Catalina	CSS	·	2.2 km	MPC · JPL
293997	2007 TY_{83}	—	October 8, 2007	Catalina	CSS	·	1.1 km	MPC · JPL
293998	2007 TB_{84}	—	October 8, 2007	Kitt Peak	Spacewatch	·	760 m	MPC · JPL
293999	2007 TE_{84}	—	October 8, 2007	Catalina	CSS	·	1.5 km	MPC · JPL
294000	2007 TH_{87}	—	October 8, 2007	Mount Lemmon	Mount Lemmon Survey	·	780 m	MPC · JPL

back to top

== See also ==
- Meanings of minor-planet names: 293001–294000
