= Meanings of minor-planet names: 294001–295000 =

As minor planet discoveries are confirmed, they are given a permanent number by the IAU's Minor Planet Center (MPC), and the discoverers can then submit names for them, following the IAU's naming conventions. The list below concerns those minor planets in the specified number-range that have received names, and explains the meanings of those names.

Official naming citations of newly named small Solar System bodies are approved and published in a bulletin by IAU's Working Group for Small Bodies Nomenclature (WGSBN). Before May 2021, citations were published in MPC's Minor Planet Circulars for many decades. Recent citations can also be found on the JPL Small-Body Database (SBDB). Until his death in 2016, German astronomer Lutz D. Schmadel compiled these citations into the Dictionary of Minor Planet Names (DMP) and regularly updated the collection.

Based on Paul Herget's The Names of the Minor Planets, Schmadel also researched the unclear origin of numerous asteroids, most of which had been named prior to World War II. This article incorporates text from this source, which is in the public domain: SBDB New namings may only be added to this list below after official publication as the preannouncement of names is condemned. The WGSBN publishes a comprehensive guideline for the naming rules of non-cometary small Solar System bodies.

== 294001–294100 ==
Named minor planet	Provisional	This minor planet was named for...	Ref · Catalog
294077 Ingridsteeger	2007 TZ_{184}	Ingrid Steeger, German actress.	IAU · 294077

== 294101–294200 ==
back to top

Named minor planet	Provisional	This minor planet was named for...	Ref · Catalog
There are no named minor planets in this number range

== 294201–294300 ==
back to top

Named minor planet	Provisional	This minor planet was named for...	Ref · Catalog
294295 Brodardmarc	2007 VU	Brodard Marc (born 1950), a retired teacher and demonstrator at the Observatory Naef, Switzerland	JPL · 294295
294296 Efeso	2007 VS_{2}	Ephesus (Efeso), a city in the Turkish province of Izmir province, was famed for the nearby Temple of Artemis, one of the seven Wonders of the ancient World. Among many other monumental buildings are the Library of Celsus and a theatre capable of holding 25.000 spectators. Efeso is a UNESCO World Heritage Site.	JPL · 294296

== 294301–294400 ==
back to top

Named minor planet	Provisional	This minor planet was named for...	Ref · Catalog
There are no named minor planets in this number range

== 294401–294500 ==
back to top

Named minor planet	Provisional	This minor planet was named for...	Ref · Catalog
294402 Joeorr	2007 VN_{1891}	Joseph Newton Orr (1954–2013), a longtime supporter of Lowell Observatory's research and preservation efforts.	JPL · 294402

== 294501–294600 ==
back to top

Named minor planet	Provisional	This minor planet was named for...	Ref · Catalog
294595 Shingareva	2008 AH_{1}	Kira B. Shingareva (born 1938), a professor at the Moscow State University for Geodesy and Cartography, and the head of the Planetary Cartography Laboratory	JPL · 294595
294600 Abedinabedin	2008 AA_{3}	Abedin Y. Abedin (born 1982), a friend of Chinese co-discoverer Ye Quan-Zhi	JPL · 294600

== 294601–294700 ==
back to top

Named minor planet	Provisional	This minor planet was named for...	Ref · Catalog
294664 Trakai	2008 AL_{86}	Trakai is a Lithuanian historic city known for its medieval island castle and lake resort.	JPL · 294664

== 294701–294800 ==
back to top

Named minor planet	Provisional	This minor planet was named for...	Ref · Catalog
294727 Dennisritchie	2008 BV_{41}	Dennis Ritchie (1941–2011), a computer scientist, creator of the C programming language, and winner of the Turing, Hamming Medal and National Medal of Technology awards.	JPL · 294727

== 294801–294900 ==
back to top

Named minor planet	Provisional	This minor planet was named for...	Ref · Catalog
294814 Nataliakidalova	2008 CJ_{117}	Natalia Kidalova (born 1976) is a school teacher of English and Ukrainian language. She was the winner of the Global Teacher Prize Ukraine 2019, an annual national prize for teachers in Ukraine.	IAU · 294814

== 294901–295000 ==
back to top

Named minor planet	Provisional	This minor planet was named for...	Ref · Catalog
There are no named minor planets in this number range

back to top

Preceded by 293,001–294,000	Meanings of minor-planet names List of minor planets: 294,001–295,000	Succeeded by 295,001–296,000
