= List of minor planets: 294001–295000 =

The following is a partial list of minor planets, running from minor-planet number 294001 through 295000, inclusive. The primary data for this and other partial lists is based on JPL's "Small-Body Orbital Elements" and data available from the Minor Planet Center. Critical list information is also provided by the MPC, unless otherwise specified from Lowell Observatory. A detailed description of the table's columns and additional sources are given on the main page including a complete list of every page in this series, and a statistical break-up on the dynamical classification of minor planets.

Also see the summary list of all named bodies in numerical and alphabetical order, and the corresponding naming citations for the number range of this particular list. New namings may only be added to this list after official publication, as the preannouncement of names is condemned by the Working Group for Small Bodies Nomenclature of the International Astronomical Union.

Near-Earth obj.	MBA (inner)	MBA (outer)	Centaur
Mars-crosser	MBA (middle)	Jupiter trojan	Trans-Neptunian obj.
Unclassified

== 294001–294100 ==
Designation			Discovery			Properties		Ref
Permanent	Provisional	Named after	Date	Site	Discoverer(s)	Category	Diam.	Ref
294001	2007 TM_{87}	—	October 8, 2007	Mount Lemmon	Mount Lemmon Survey	·	900 m	MPC · JPL
294002	2007 TR_{88}	—	October 8, 2007	Kitt Peak	Spacewatch	HNS	1.8 km	MPC · JPL
294003	2007 TN_{89}	—	April 17, 1996	Kitt Peak	Spacewatch	HOF	3.5 km	MPC · JPL
294004	2007 TE_{93}	—	October 6, 2007	Kitt Peak	Spacewatch	(5)	1.2 km	MPC · JPL
294005	2007 TO_{94}	—	October 7, 2007	Catalina	CSS	·	3.8 km	MPC · JPL
294006	2007 TD_{95}	—	October 7, 2007	Catalina	CSS	·	1.9 km	MPC · JPL
294007	2007 TL_{95}	—	October 7, 2007	Catalina	CSS	EUN · fast	2.2 km	MPC · JPL
294008	2007 TN_{95}	—	October 7, 2007	Catalina	CSS	EUN	1.7 km	MPC · JPL
294009	2007 TV_{95}	—	October 7, 2007	Kitt Peak	Spacewatch	TIR	3.3 km	MPC · JPL
294010	2007 TW_{95}	—	October 7, 2007	Kitt Peak	Spacewatch	·	2.7 km	MPC · JPL
294011	2007 TQ_{99}	—	October 8, 2007	Mount Lemmon	Mount Lemmon Survey	·	1.6 km	MPC · JPL
294012	2007 TC_{100}	—	October 8, 2007	Mount Lemmon	Mount Lemmon Survey	·	710 m	MPC · JPL
294013	2007 TE_{100}	—	October 8, 2007	Mount Lemmon	Mount Lemmon Survey	·	720 m	MPC · JPL
294014	2007 TV_{102}	—	October 8, 2007	Mount Lemmon	Mount Lemmon Survey	(5)	1.5 km	MPC · JPL
294015	2007 TG_{103}	—	October 8, 2007	Mount Lemmon	Mount Lemmon Survey	·	4.3 km	MPC · JPL
294016	2007 TZ_{108}	—	October 7, 2007	Catalina	CSS	(2076)	1.1 km	MPC · JPL
294017	2007 TK_{109}	—	October 7, 2007	Catalina	CSS	·	920 m	MPC · JPL
294018	2007 TX_{111}	—	October 8, 2007	Catalina	CSS	·	2.9 km	MPC · JPL
294019	2007 TY_{112}	—	October 8, 2007	Catalina	CSS	·	1.5 km	MPC · JPL
294020	2007 TN_{113}	—	October 8, 2007	Anderson Mesa	LONEOS	·	1.1 km	MPC · JPL
294021	2007 TQ_{114}	—	October 8, 2007	Catalina	CSS	·	3.2 km	MPC · JPL
294022	2007 TT_{121}	—	October 6, 2007	Kitt Peak	Spacewatch	·	3.3 km	MPC · JPL
294023	2007 TU_{121}	—	October 6, 2007	Kitt Peak	Spacewatch	·	690 m	MPC · JPL
294024	2007 TK_{122}	—	October 6, 2007	Kitt Peak	Spacewatch	·	1.3 km	MPC · JPL
294025	2007 TH_{123}	—	October 6, 2007	Kitt Peak	Spacewatch	·	2.0 km	MPC · JPL
294026	2007 TD_{124}	—	October 6, 2007	Kitt Peak	Spacewatch	JUN	1.3 km	MPC · JPL
294027	2007 TR_{124}	—	October 6, 2007	Kitt Peak	Spacewatch	·	2.3 km	MPC · JPL
294028	2007 TT_{125}	—	October 6, 2007	Kitt Peak	Spacewatch	MAS	960 m	MPC · JPL
294029	2007 TO_{126}	—	October 6, 2007	Kitt Peak	Spacewatch	·	2.4 km	MPC · JPL
294030	2007 TF_{127}	—	October 6, 2007	Kitt Peak	Spacewatch	·	1.6 km	MPC · JPL
294031	2007 TY_{127}	—	October 6, 2007	Kitt Peak	Spacewatch	·	800 m	MPC · JPL
294032	2007 TG_{128}	—	October 6, 2007	Kitt Peak	Spacewatch	·	1.8 km	MPC · JPL
294033	2007 TZ_{128}	—	October 6, 2007	Kitt Peak	Spacewatch	·	1.6 km	MPC · JPL
294034	2007 TE_{129}	—	October 6, 2007	Kitt Peak	Spacewatch	·	810 m	MPC · JPL
294035	2007 TY_{129}	—	October 6, 2007	Kitt Peak	Spacewatch	V	730 m	MPC · JPL
294036	2007 TP_{130}	—	October 7, 2007	Kitt Peak	Spacewatch	·	1.3 km	MPC · JPL
294037	2007 TH_{131}	—	October 7, 2007	Mount Lemmon	Mount Lemmon Survey	·	2.2 km	MPC · JPL
294038	2007 TP_{131}	—	October 7, 2007	Mount Lemmon	Mount Lemmon Survey	·	2.2 km	MPC · JPL
294039	2007 TW_{131}	—	October 7, 2007	Mount Lemmon	Mount Lemmon Survey	KOR	1.4 km	MPC · JPL
294040	2007 TH_{132}	—	October 7, 2007	Mount Lemmon	Mount Lemmon Survey	·	610 m	MPC · JPL
294041	2007 TN_{133}	—	October 7, 2007	Mount Lemmon	Mount Lemmon Survey	EUN	2.5 km	MPC · JPL
294042	2007 TF_{135}	—	October 8, 2007	Kitt Peak	Spacewatch	·	2.8 km	MPC · JPL
294043	2007 TT_{135}	—	October 8, 2007	Kitt Peak	Spacewatch	LIX	4.2 km	MPC · JPL
294044	2007 TP_{138}	—	October 9, 2007	Catalina	CSS	·	4.0 km	MPC · JPL
294045	2007 TN_{140}	—	October 9, 2007	Mount Lemmon	Mount Lemmon Survey	·	1.8 km	MPC · JPL
294046	2007 TU_{140}	—	October 9, 2007	Mount Lemmon	Mount Lemmon Survey	·	1.7 km	MPC · JPL
294047	2007 TY_{142}	—	October 15, 2007	Dauban	Chante-Perdrix	·	920 m	MPC · JPL
294048	2007 TZ_{146}	—	October 6, 2007	Socorro	LINEAR	·	2.2 km	MPC · JPL
294049	2007 TC_{148}	—	October 7, 2007	Socorro	LINEAR	MAS	1.0 km	MPC · JPL
294050	2007 TX_{150}	—	October 9, 2007	Socorro	LINEAR	·	1.4 km	MPC · JPL
294051	2007 TO_{151}	—	October 9, 2007	Socorro	LINEAR	·	880 m	MPC · JPL
294052	2007 TN_{152}	—	October 9, 2007	Socorro	LINEAR	·	1.8 km	MPC · JPL
294053	2007 TU_{153}	—	October 9, 2007	Socorro	LINEAR	·	1.1 km	MPC · JPL
294054	2007 TW_{154}	—	October 9, 2007	Socorro	LINEAR	·	1.9 km	MPC · JPL
294055	2007 TF_{155}	—	October 9, 2007	Socorro	LINEAR	·	3.9 km	MPC · JPL
294056	2007 TV_{155}	—	October 9, 2007	Socorro	LINEAR	TEL	1.8 km	MPC · JPL
294057	2007 TA_{156}	—	October 9, 2007	Socorro	LINEAR	ERI	1.8 km	MPC · JPL
294058	2007 TE_{156}	—	October 9, 2007	Socorro	LINEAR	·	2.4 km	MPC · JPL
294059	2007 TP_{157}	—	October 9, 2007	Socorro	LINEAR	TIR	3.8 km	MPC · JPL
294060	2007 TY_{158}	—	October 9, 2007	Socorro	LINEAR	·	2.1 km	MPC · JPL
294061	2007 TM_{164}	—	October 11, 2007	Socorro	LINEAR	·	2.1 km	MPC · JPL
294062	2007 TX_{165}	—	October 11, 2007	Socorro	LINEAR	(18466)	2.9 km	MPC · JPL
294063	2007 TM_{168}	—	October 12, 2007	Socorro	LINEAR	·	1.9 km	MPC · JPL
294064	2007 TF_{169}	—	October 12, 2007	Socorro	LINEAR	WIT	1.3 km	MPC · JPL
294065	2007 TU_{169}	—	October 12, 2007	Socorro	LINEAR	·	2.5 km	MPC · JPL
294066	2007 TX_{169}	—	October 12, 2007	Socorro	LINEAR	·	3.2 km	MPC · JPL
294067	2007 TK_{170}	—	October 12, 2007	Socorro	LINEAR	·	4.6 km	MPC · JPL
294068	2007 TR_{173}	—	October 4, 2007	Kitt Peak	Spacewatch	·	1.8 km	MPC · JPL
294069	2007 TA_{176}	—	October 5, 2007	Kitt Peak	Spacewatch	·	3.1 km	MPC · JPL
294070	2007 TW_{176}	—	October 6, 2007	Kitt Peak	Spacewatch	·	1.8 km	MPC · JPL
294071	2007 TK_{177}	—	October 6, 2007	Kitt Peak	Spacewatch	·	3.2 km	MPC · JPL
294072	2007 TN_{177}	—	October 6, 2007	Kitt Peak	Spacewatch	·	2.1 km	MPC · JPL
294073	2007 TB_{180}	—	October 7, 2007	Mount Lemmon	Mount Lemmon Survey	·	3.7 km	MPC · JPL
294074	2007 TE_{180}	—	October 7, 2007	Kitt Peak	Spacewatch	V	890 m	MPC · JPL
294075	2007 TN_{180}	—	October 8, 2007	Mount Lemmon	Mount Lemmon Survey	·	790 m	MPC · JPL
294076	2007 TW_{180}	—	October 8, 2007	Anderson Mesa	LONEOS	(5)	1.3 km	MPC · JPL
294077 Ingridsteeger	2007 TZ_{184}	Ingridsteeger	October 13, 2007	Gaisberg	Gierlinger, R.	·	980 m	MPC · JPL
294078	2007 TV_{185}	—	October 13, 2007	Socorro	LINEAR	·	4.3 km	MPC · JPL
294079	2007 TM_{186}	—	October 13, 2007	Socorro	LINEAR	·	2.4 km	MPC · JPL
294080	2007 TT_{187}	—	October 14, 2007	Socorro	LINEAR	H	680 m	MPC · JPL
294081	2007 TK_{189}	—	October 4, 2007	Mount Lemmon	Mount Lemmon Survey	·	780 m	MPC · JPL
294082	2007 TZ_{191}	—	June 7, 2002	Palomar	NEAT	EUN	1.5 km	MPC · JPL
294083	2007 TC_{193}	—	October 6, 2007	Kitt Peak	Spacewatch	KOR	1.6 km	MPC · JPL
294084	2007 TO_{195}	—	October 7, 2007	Mount Lemmon	Mount Lemmon Survey	·	1.8 km	MPC · JPL
294085	2007 TZ_{197}	—	October 8, 2007	Kitt Peak	Spacewatch	·	3.2 km	MPC · JPL
294086	2007 TU_{200}	—	October 8, 2007	Kitt Peak	Spacewatch	·	1.9 km	MPC · JPL
294087	2007 TX_{204}	—	October 8, 2007	Mount Lemmon	Mount Lemmon Survey	·	5.7 km	MPC · JPL
294088	2007 TR_{205}	—	October 9, 2007	Mount Lemmon	Mount Lemmon Survey	·	2.0 km	MPC · JPL
294089	2007 TP_{211}	—	October 7, 2007	Kitt Peak	Spacewatch	·	1.7 km	MPC · JPL
294090	2007 TY_{212}	—	October 7, 2007	Kitt Peak	Spacewatch	·	3.5 km	MPC · JPL
294091	2007 TE_{213}	—	October 7, 2007	Kitt Peak	Spacewatch	·	3.5 km	MPC · JPL
294092	2007 TR_{213}	—	October 7, 2007	Kitt Peak	Spacewatch	EOS	2.7 km	MPC · JPL
294093	2007 TJ_{216}	—	October 7, 2007	Kitt Peak	Spacewatch	·	2.2 km	MPC · JPL
294094	2007 TF_{217}	—	October 7, 2007	Kitt Peak	Spacewatch	·	3.2 km	MPC · JPL
294095	2007 TR_{217}	—	October 7, 2007	Kitt Peak	Spacewatch	·	2.4 km	MPC · JPL
294096	2007 TV_{217}	—	October 7, 2007	Kitt Peak	Spacewatch	·	3.9 km	MPC · JPL
294097	2007 TQ_{218}	—	October 7, 2007	Kitt Peak	Spacewatch	·	3.8 km	MPC · JPL
294098	2007 TD_{225}	—	October 11, 2007	Mount Lemmon	Mount Lemmon Survey	·	4.6 km	MPC · JPL
294099	2007 TO_{226}	—	October 8, 2007	Kitt Peak	Spacewatch	MAS	720 m	MPC · JPL
294100	2007 TR_{226}	—	October 8, 2007	Kitt Peak	Spacewatch	·	1.4 km	MPC · JPL

== 294101–294200 ==
back to top

Designation			Discovery			Properties		Ref
Permanent	Provisional	Named after	Date	Site	Discoverer(s)	Category	Diam.	Ref
294101	2007 TG_{227}	—	October 8, 2007	Kitt Peak	Spacewatch	·	990 m	MPC · JPL
294102	2007 TZ_{227}	—	October 8, 2007	Kitt Peak	Spacewatch	·	1.1 km	MPC · JPL
294103	2007 TC_{230}	—	October 8, 2007	Mount Lemmon	Mount Lemmon Survey	KOR	1.4 km	MPC · JPL
294104	2007 TA_{231}	—	October 8, 2007	Kitt Peak	Spacewatch	·	2.2 km	MPC · JPL
294105	2007 TF_{231}	—	October 8, 2007	Kitt Peak	Spacewatch	·	1.5 km	MPC · JPL
294106	2007 TR_{231}	—	October 8, 2007	Kitt Peak	Spacewatch	·	1.4 km	MPC · JPL
294107	2007 TP_{232}	—	October 8, 2007	Kitt Peak	Spacewatch	V	680 m	MPC · JPL
294108	2007 TB_{233}	—	October 8, 2007	Kitt Peak	Spacewatch	KOR	1.5 km	MPC · JPL
294109	2007 TD_{233}	—	October 8, 2007	Kitt Peak	Spacewatch	·	3.6 km	MPC · JPL
294110	2007 TR_{233}	—	October 8, 2007	Kitt Peak	Spacewatch	KOR	1.8 km	MPC · JPL
294111	2007 TP_{234}	—	October 8, 2007	Kitt Peak	Spacewatch	·	1.7 km	MPC · JPL
294112	2007 TJ_{235}	—	October 9, 2007	Kitt Peak	Spacewatch	·	1.6 km	MPC · JPL
294113	2007 TL_{237}	—	October 9, 2007	Mount Lemmon	Mount Lemmon Survey	·	1.7 km	MPC · JPL
294114	2007 TQ_{237}	—	October 9, 2007	Mount Lemmon	Mount Lemmon Survey	·	1.4 km	MPC · JPL
294115	2007 TL_{241}	—	October 7, 2007	Mount Lemmon	Mount Lemmon Survey	·	2.0 km	MPC · JPL
294116	2007 TB_{244}	—	October 8, 2007	Catalina	CSS	·	1.5 km	MPC · JPL
294117	2007 TU_{246}	—	October 9, 2007	Catalina	CSS	EUN	2.0 km	MPC · JPL
294118	2007 TW_{246}	—	October 9, 2007	Catalina	CSS	·	2.6 km	MPC · JPL
294119	2007 TS_{250}	—	October 11, 2007	Mount Lemmon	Mount Lemmon Survey	·	3.4 km	MPC · JPL
294120	2007 TC_{253}	—	October 8, 2007	Mount Lemmon	Mount Lemmon Survey	·	1.8 km	MPC · JPL
294121	2007 TZ_{259}	—	October 10, 2007	Mount Lemmon	Mount Lemmon Survey	·	960 m	MPC · JPL
294122	2007 TH_{261}	—	October 10, 2007	Kitt Peak	Spacewatch	·	1.9 km	MPC · JPL
294123	2007 TL_{264}	—	October 11, 2007	Kitt Peak	Spacewatch	WIT	1.1 km	MPC · JPL
294124	2007 TR_{266}	—	October 9, 2007	Kitt Peak	Spacewatch	·	4.1 km	MPC · JPL
294125	2007 TY_{267}	—	October 9, 2007	Kitt Peak	Spacewatch	·	3.8 km	MPC · JPL
294126	2007 TB_{268}	—	October 9, 2007	Kitt Peak	Spacewatch	·	1.3 km	MPC · JPL
294127	2007 TL_{268}	—	October 9, 2007	Kitt Peak	Spacewatch	HOF	3.1 km	MPC · JPL
294128	2007 TR_{270}	—	October 9, 2007	Kitt Peak	Spacewatch	·	1.6 km	MPC · JPL
294129	2007 TZ_{271}	—	October 9, 2007	Kitt Peak	Spacewatch	·	1.4 km	MPC · JPL
294130	2007 TU_{272}	—	October 9, 2007	Kitt Peak	Spacewatch	V	1.0 km	MPC · JPL
294131	2007 TF_{274}	—	October 11, 2007	Kitt Peak	Spacewatch	·	1.5 km	MPC · JPL
294132	2007 TQ_{274}	—	October 11, 2007	Kitt Peak	Spacewatch	L4	13 km	MPC · JPL
294133	2007 TH_{277}	—	October 11, 2007	Mount Lemmon	Mount Lemmon Survey	·	1.8 km	MPC · JPL
294134	2007 TS_{282}	—	October 8, 2007	Mount Lemmon	Mount Lemmon Survey	·	1.5 km	MPC · JPL
294135	2007 TO_{289}	—	October 12, 2007	Mount Lemmon	Mount Lemmon Survey	·	1.6 km	MPC · JPL
294136	2007 TU_{289}	—	October 12, 2007	Catalina	CSS	·	1.1 km	MPC · JPL
294137	2007 TA_{291}	—	October 13, 2007	Mount Lemmon	Mount Lemmon Survey	·	5.0 km	MPC · JPL
294138	2007 TA_{294}	—	October 9, 2007	Mount Lemmon	Mount Lemmon Survey	·	980 m	MPC · JPL
294139	2007 TL_{301}	—	October 12, 2007	Kitt Peak	Spacewatch	·	730 m	MPC · JPL
294140	2007 TN_{301}	—	October 12, 2007	Kitt Peak	Spacewatch	·	1.8 km	MPC · JPL
294141	2007 TM_{302}	—	October 12, 2007	Kitt Peak	Spacewatch	NYS	1.3 km	MPC · JPL
294142	2007 TT_{303}	—	October 12, 2007	Anderson Mesa	LONEOS	·	3.5 km	MPC · JPL
294143	2007 TA_{311}	—	October 11, 2007	Kitt Peak	Spacewatch	·	3.0 km	MPC · JPL
294144	2007 TC_{313}	—	October 11, 2007	Mount Lemmon	Mount Lemmon Survey	·	2.1 km	MPC · JPL
294145	2007 TY_{314}	—	October 12, 2007	Kitt Peak	Spacewatch	·	650 m	MPC · JPL
294146	2007 TF_{317}	—	October 12, 2007	Kitt Peak	Spacewatch	·	710 m	MPC · JPL
294147	2007 TL_{317}	—	October 12, 2007	Kitt Peak	Spacewatch	·	1.3 km	MPC · JPL
294148	2007 TR_{318}	—	October 12, 2007	Kitt Peak	Spacewatch	·	5.2 km	MPC · JPL
294149	2007 TQ_{321}	—	October 14, 2007	Mount Lemmon	Mount Lemmon Survey	·	1.5 km	MPC · JPL
294150	2007 TY_{327}	—	October 11, 2007	Kitt Peak	Spacewatch	·	2.9 km	MPC · JPL
294151	2007 TA_{328}	—	October 11, 2007	Kitt Peak	Spacewatch	·	2.4 km	MPC · JPL
294152	2007 TR_{331}	—	October 11, 2007	Kitt Peak	Spacewatch	AGN	1.2 km	MPC · JPL
294153	2007 TB_{334}	—	October 11, 2007	Kitt Peak	Spacewatch	AGN	1.2 km	MPC · JPL
294154	2007 TS_{334}	—	October 11, 2007	Kitt Peak	Spacewatch	·	3.1 km	MPC · JPL
294155	2007 TX_{335}	—	October 12, 2007	Kitt Peak	Spacewatch	·	3.0 km	MPC · JPL
294156	2007 TH_{337}	—	October 13, 2007	Catalina	CSS	·	1.3 km	MPC · JPL
294157	2007 TO_{339}	—	October 8, 2007	Mount Lemmon	Mount Lemmon Survey	·	960 m	MPC · JPL
294158	2007 TQ_{350}	—	October 14, 2007	Mount Lemmon	Mount Lemmon Survey	NYS	1.2 km	MPC · JPL
294159	2007 TS_{352}	—	October 14, 2007	Mount Lemmon	Mount Lemmon Survey	L4	14 km	MPC · JPL
294160	2007 TP_{357}	—	October 13, 2007	Kitt Peak	Spacewatch	NEM	2.8 km	MPC · JPL
294161	2007 TQ_{357}	—	October 13, 2007	Kitt Peak	Spacewatch	·	2.1 km	MPC · JPL
294162	2007 TV_{358}	—	October 14, 2007	Mount Lemmon	Mount Lemmon Survey	KOR	1.5 km	MPC · JPL
294163	2007 TE_{364}	—	October 14, 2007	Mount Lemmon	Mount Lemmon Survey	·	6.7 km	MPC · JPL
294164	2007 TT_{365}	—	October 9, 2007	Mount Lemmon	Mount Lemmon Survey	NYS	1.2 km	MPC · JPL
294165	2007 TH_{369}	—	October 11, 2007	Kitt Peak	Spacewatch	·	2.3 km	MPC · JPL
294166	2007 TL_{369}	—	October 11, 2007	Mount Lemmon	Mount Lemmon Survey	KOR	1.5 km	MPC · JPL
294167	2007 TV_{369}	—	October 12, 2007	Catalina	CSS	·	1.2 km	MPC · JPL
294168	2007 TY_{369}	—	October 12, 2007	Goodricke-Pigott	R. A. Tucker	·	3.7 km	MPC · JPL
294169	2007 TD_{374}	—	October 14, 2007	Mount Lemmon	Mount Lemmon Survey	·	1.7 km	MPC · JPL
294170	2007 TX_{376}	—	October 11, 2007	Catalina	CSS	·	1.5 km	MPC · JPL
294171	2007 TL_{381}	—	October 14, 2007	Kitt Peak	Spacewatch	EUN	1.2 km	MPC · JPL
294172	2007 TA_{387}	—	October 12, 2007	Kitt Peak	Spacewatch	·	2.3 km	MPC · JPL
294173	2007 TJ_{387}	—	October 13, 2007	Kitt Peak	Spacewatch	KOR	1.4 km	MPC · JPL
294174	2007 TC_{388}	—	October 13, 2007	Mount Lemmon	Mount Lemmon Survey	·	1.7 km	MPC · JPL
294175	2007 TU_{388}	—	October 13, 2007	Catalina	CSS	·	4.4 km	MPC · JPL
294176	2007 TW_{389}	—	October 13, 2007	Kitt Peak	Spacewatch	HNS	1.5 km	MPC · JPL
294177	2007 TY_{390}	—	October 14, 2007	Mount Lemmon	Mount Lemmon Survey	·	1.4 km	MPC · JPL
294178	2007 TG_{391}	—	October 15, 2007	Kitt Peak	Spacewatch	AGN	1.2 km	MPC · JPL
294179	2007 TC_{392}	—	October 15, 2007	Catalina	CSS	NYS	1.4 km	MPC · JPL
294180	2007 TP_{392}	—	October 15, 2007	Catalina	CSS	T_{j} (2.98) · 3:2 · SHU	4.6 km	MPC · JPL
294181	2007 TA_{395}	—	October 15, 2007	Kitt Peak	Spacewatch	KOR	1.6 km	MPC · JPL
294182	2007 TJ_{398}	—	October 15, 2007	Mount Lemmon	Mount Lemmon Survey	·	1.4 km	MPC · JPL
294183	2007 TV_{398}	—	October 15, 2007	Kitt Peak	Spacewatch	·	3.2 km	MPC · JPL
294184	2007 TV_{399}	—	October 15, 2007	Kitt Peak	Spacewatch	LIX	4.4 km	MPC · JPL
294185	2007 TB_{401}	—	October 14, 2007	Mount Lemmon	Mount Lemmon Survey	·	1.7 km	MPC · JPL
294186	2007 TD_{401}	—	October 14, 2007	Mount Lemmon	Mount Lemmon Survey	·	870 m	MPC · JPL
294187	2007 TQ_{403}	—	October 15, 2007	Kitt Peak	Spacewatch	·	2.2 km	MPC · JPL
294188	2007 TV_{406}	—	October 15, 2007	Catalina	CSS	·	3.0 km	MPC · JPL
294189	2007 TR_{410}	—	October 14, 2007	Catalina	CSS	·	5.3 km	MPC · JPL
294190	2007 TS_{411}	—	October 14, 2007	Catalina	CSS	·	3.5 km	MPC · JPL
294191	2007 TD_{412}	—	October 14, 2007	Catalina	CSS	·	1.3 km	MPC · JPL
294192	2007 TK_{413}	—	October 15, 2007	Anderson Mesa	LONEOS	·	3.2 km	MPC · JPL
294193	2007 TQ_{414}	—	October 15, 2007	Catalina	CSS	MAR	1.6 km	MPC · JPL
294194	2007 TO_{418}	—	October 7, 2007	Kitt Peak	Spacewatch	·	1.7 km	MPC · JPL
294195	2007 TV_{418}	—	October 8, 2007	Mount Lemmon	Mount Lemmon Survey	·	2.5 km	MPC · JPL
294196	2007 TJ_{419}	—	October 12, 2007	Mount Lemmon	Mount Lemmon Survey	EOS	1.9 km	MPC · JPL
294197	2007 TM_{421}	—	October 12, 2007	Catalina	CSS	·	2.9 km	MPC · JPL
294198	2007 TO_{421}	—	October 12, 2007	Catalina	CSS	MAR	1.3 km	MPC · JPL
294199	2007 TA_{422}	—	October 15, 2007	Catalina	CSS	·	2.5 km	MPC · JPL
294200	2007 TA_{427}	—	October 9, 2007	Kitt Peak	Spacewatch	·	1.6 km	MPC · JPL

== 294201–294300 ==
back to top

Designation			Discovery			Properties		Ref
Permanent	Provisional	Named after	Date	Site	Discoverer(s)	Category	Diam.	Ref
294201	2007 TO_{429}	—	October 12, 2007	Kitt Peak	Spacewatch	·	3.4 km	MPC · JPL
294202	2007 TB_{430}	—	October 11, 2007	Kitt Peak	Spacewatch	V	720 m	MPC · JPL
294203	2007 TQ_{430}	—	October 13, 2007	Kitt Peak	Spacewatch	·	2.4 km	MPC · JPL
294204 Guinan	2007 TS_{430}	Guinan	October 14, 2007	Mount Lemmon	Mount Lemmon Survey	·	870 m	MPC · JPL
294205	2007 TT_{430}	—	October 14, 2007	Mount Lemmon	Mount Lemmon Survey	·	1.3 km	MPC · JPL
294206	2007 TA_{435}	—	October 4, 2007	Mount Lemmon	Mount Lemmon Survey	·	1.1 km	MPC · JPL
294207	2007 TL_{435}	—	October 12, 2007	Mount Lemmon	Mount Lemmon Survey	·	3.1 km	MPC · JPL
294208	2007 TC_{436}	—	October 15, 2007	Mount Lemmon	Mount Lemmon Survey	·	2.6 km	MPC · JPL
294209	2007 TM_{448}	—	October 8, 2007	Catalina	CSS	·	2.7 km	MPC · JPL
294210	2007 UA	—	October 16, 2007	Mayhill	Lowe, A.	·	2.2 km	MPC · JPL
294211	2007 UY	—	October 16, 2007	7300	W. K. Y. Yeung	(5)	1.4 km	MPC · JPL
294212	2007 UG_{2}	—	October 18, 2007	Mayhill	Lowe, A.	·	2.0 km	MPC · JPL
294213	2007 US_{2}	—	October 18, 2007	7300	W. K. Y. Yeung	·	1.9 km	MPC · JPL
294214	2007 UC_{3}	—	October 16, 2007	7300	W. K. Y. Yeung	·	2.6 km	MPC · JPL
294215	2007 UK_{3}	—	October 18, 2007	Junk Bond	D. Healy	·	5.0 km	MPC · JPL
294216	2007 UM_{4}	—	October 16, 2007	Bisei SG Center	BATTeRS	·	2.5 km	MPC · JPL
294217	2007 UL_{6}	—	October 20, 2007	Tiki	Teamo, N.	·	2.1 km	MPC · JPL
294218	2007 UR_{6}	—	October 19, 2007	Socorro	LINEAR	·	3.5 km	MPC · JPL
294219	2007 UN_{9}	—	October 17, 2007	Anderson Mesa	LONEOS	EUN	1.6 km	MPC · JPL
294220	2007 US_{10}	—	October 18, 2007	Anderson Mesa	LONEOS	·	1.2 km	MPC · JPL
294221	2007 UU_{10}	—	October 18, 2007	Anderson Mesa	LONEOS	·	2.8 km	MPC · JPL
294222	2007 UL_{14}	—	October 16, 2007	Catalina	CSS	·	2.5 km	MPC · JPL
294223	2007 UE_{18}	—	October 17, 2007	Anderson Mesa	LONEOS	·	3.4 km	MPC · JPL
294224	2007 UK_{18}	—	October 17, 2007	Anderson Mesa	LONEOS	V	1 km	MPC · JPL
294225	2007 UY_{20}	—	October 16, 2007	Kitt Peak	Spacewatch	·	2.0 km	MPC · JPL
294226	2007 UZ_{20}	—	October 16, 2007	Kitt Peak	Spacewatch	BRA	2.8 km	MPC · JPL
294227	2007 UN_{21}	—	October 16, 2007	Kitt Peak	Spacewatch	·	2.7 km	MPC · JPL
294228	2007 US_{24}	—	October 16, 2007	Kitt Peak	Spacewatch	·	3.1 km	MPC · JPL
294229	2007 UZ_{25}	—	October 16, 2007	Kitt Peak	Spacewatch	·	1.0 km	MPC · JPL
294230	2007 UK_{27}	—	October 16, 2007	Mount Lemmon	Mount Lemmon Survey	·	2.2 km	MPC · JPL
294231	2007 UU_{28}	—	October 17, 2007	Anderson Mesa	LONEOS	URS	5.1 km	MPC · JPL
294232	2007 UZ_{28}	—	October 18, 2007	Kitt Peak	Spacewatch	·	1.4 km	MPC · JPL
294233	2007 UL_{29}	—	October 18, 2007	Kitt Peak	Spacewatch	·	1.5 km	MPC · JPL
294234	2007 UC_{34}	—	October 17, 2007	Anderson Mesa	LONEOS	(194)	2.0 km	MPC · JPL
294235	2007 UJ_{36}	—	October 19, 2007	Kitt Peak	Spacewatch	·	1.3 km	MPC · JPL
294236	2007 UM_{37}	—	October 19, 2007	Catalina	CSS	·	2.4 km	MPC · JPL
294237	2007 UZ_{37}	—	October 19, 2007	Kitt Peak	Spacewatch	·	3.6 km	MPC · JPL
294238	2007 UB_{38}	—	October 19, 2007	Kitt Peak	Spacewatch	·	1.8 km	MPC · JPL
294239	2007 UV_{38}	—	October 20, 2007	Catalina	CSS	·	1.7 km	MPC · JPL
294240	2007 UN_{40}	—	October 16, 2007	Kitt Peak	Spacewatch	·	2.4 km	MPC · JPL
294241	2007 UB_{41}	—	October 16, 2007	Kitt Peak	Spacewatch	EOS	2.4 km	MPC · JPL
294242	2007 UM_{42}	—	October 16, 2007	Mount Lemmon	Mount Lemmon Survey	·	2.1 km	MPC · JPL
294243	2007 UC_{46}	—	October 20, 2007	Catalina	CSS	·	1.4 km	MPC · JPL
294244	2007 UT_{48}	—	October 20, 2007	Mount Lemmon	Mount Lemmon Survey	V	660 m	MPC · JPL
294245	2007 UL_{52}	—	October 24, 2007	Mount Lemmon	Mount Lemmon Survey	·	1.1 km	MPC · JPL
294246	2007 UR_{52}	—	October 24, 2007	Mount Lemmon	Mount Lemmon Survey	·	3.0 km	MPC · JPL
294247	2007 UV_{56}	—	October 30, 2007	Mount Lemmon	Mount Lemmon Survey	V	690 m	MPC · JPL
294248	2007 UT_{58}	—	October 30, 2007	Mount Lemmon	Mount Lemmon Survey	·	3.0 km	MPC · JPL
294249	2007 UW_{59}	—	October 30, 2007	Mount Lemmon	Mount Lemmon Survey	·	1.7 km	MPC · JPL
294250	2007 UK_{65}	—	October 31, 2007	Mount Lemmon	Mount Lemmon Survey	NYS	1.3 km	MPC · JPL
294251	2007 UY_{65}	—	October 31, 2007	Kitt Peak	Spacewatch	·	2.0 km	MPC · JPL
294252	2007 UD_{68}	—	October 30, 2007	Catalina	CSS	·	900 m	MPC · JPL
294253	2007 UG_{71}	—	October 30, 2007	Mount Lemmon	Mount Lemmon Survey	·	1.9 km	MPC · JPL
294254	2007 UP_{71}	—	October 30, 2007	Catalina	CSS	·	1.0 km	MPC · JPL
294255	2007 UU_{71}	—	October 30, 2007	Mount Lemmon	Mount Lemmon Survey	·	1.1 km	MPC · JPL
294256	2007 UT_{76}	—	October 31, 2007	Mount Lemmon	Mount Lemmon Survey	·	2.2 km	MPC · JPL
294257	2007 UV_{76}	—	October 31, 2007	Mount Lemmon	Mount Lemmon Survey	KOR	1.8 km	MPC · JPL
294258	2007 UR_{80}	—	October 31, 2007	Mount Lemmon	Mount Lemmon Survey	MRX	1.4 km	MPC · JPL
294259	2007 US_{81}	—	October 30, 2007	Kitt Peak	Spacewatch	·	2.4 km	MPC · JPL
294260	2007 UG_{82}	—	October 30, 2007	Kitt Peak	Spacewatch	·	1.5 km	MPC · JPL
294261	2007 UG_{85}	—	October 30, 2007	Kitt Peak	Spacewatch	·	2.3 km	MPC · JPL
294262	2007 UT_{85}	—	October 30, 2007	Kitt Peak	Spacewatch	(12739)	2.1 km	MPC · JPL
294263	2007 UO_{87}	—	October 30, 2007	Kitt Peak	Spacewatch	·	4.0 km	MPC · JPL
294264	2007 UH_{88}	—	October 30, 2007	Kitt Peak	Spacewatch	KOR	1.5 km	MPC · JPL
294265	2007 UQ_{94}	—	October 31, 2007	Mount Lemmon	Mount Lemmon Survey	·	970 m	MPC · JPL
294266	2007 UN_{95}	—	October 31, 2007	Mount Lemmon	Mount Lemmon Survey	AGN	1.4 km	MPC · JPL
294267	2007 UX_{95}	—	October 30, 2007	Mount Lemmon	Mount Lemmon Survey	·	920 m	MPC · JPL
294268	2007 UY_{95}	—	October 30, 2007	Mount Lemmon	Mount Lemmon Survey	·	2.0 km	MPC · JPL
294269	2007 UM_{98}	—	October 30, 2007	Kitt Peak	Spacewatch	·	1.2 km	MPC · JPL
294270	2007 UT_{99}	—	October 30, 2007	Kitt Peak	Spacewatch	·	1.8 km	MPC · JPL
294271	2007 UQ_{100}	—	October 30, 2007	Kitt Peak	Spacewatch	·	800 m	MPC · JPL
294272	2007 UM_{101}	—	October 30, 2007	Kitt Peak	Spacewatch	·	1.2 km	MPC · JPL
294273	2007 UJ_{102}	—	October 30, 2007	Kitt Peak	Spacewatch	·	3.7 km	MPC · JPL
294274	2007 UX_{102}	—	October 30, 2007	Mount Lemmon	Mount Lemmon Survey	·	3.6 km	MPC · JPL
294275	2007 UJ_{103}	—	October 30, 2007	Mount Lemmon	Mount Lemmon Survey	·	3.0 km	MPC · JPL
294276	2007 UV_{103}	—	October 30, 2007	Kitt Peak	Spacewatch	·	820 m	MPC · JPL
294277	2007 UD_{104}	—	October 30, 2007	Kitt Peak	Spacewatch	·	2.7 km	MPC · JPL
294278	2007 UP_{105}	—	October 30, 2007	Kitt Peak	Spacewatch	RAF	1.4 km	MPC · JPL
294279	2007 UF_{106}	—	October 31, 2007	Mount Lemmon	Mount Lemmon Survey	·	3.2 km	MPC · JPL
294280	2007 US_{106}	—	October 31, 2007	Mount Lemmon	Mount Lemmon Survey	·	1.1 km	MPC · JPL
294281	2007 UG_{108}	—	October 30, 2007	Kitt Peak	Spacewatch	·	1.7 km	MPC · JPL
294282	2007 UV_{108}	—	October 30, 2007	Kitt Peak	Spacewatch	·	1.1 km	MPC · JPL
294283	2007 UD_{112}	—	October 30, 2007	Mount Lemmon	Mount Lemmon Survey	·	1.4 km	MPC · JPL
294284	2007 UX_{112}	—	October 30, 2007	Mount Lemmon	Mount Lemmon Survey	·	2.2 km	MPC · JPL
294285	2007 UK_{114}	—	October 31, 2007	Kitt Peak	Spacewatch	·	1.4 km	MPC · JPL
294286	2007 UP_{115}	—	October 31, 2007	Kitt Peak	Spacewatch	·	3.0 km	MPC · JPL
294287	2007 UP_{116}	—	October 30, 2007	Kitt Peak	Spacewatch	·	1.8 km	MPC · JPL
294288	2007 UH_{117}	—	October 30, 2007	Catalina	CSS	·	2.6 km	MPC · JPL
294289	2007 UO_{118}	—	October 31, 2007	Mount Lemmon	Mount Lemmon Survey	·	2.7 km	MPC · JPL
294290	2007 UY_{127}	—	October 19, 2007	Mount Lemmon	Mount Lemmon Survey	·	2.0 km	MPC · JPL
294291	2007 UD_{130}	—	October 17, 2007	Mount Lemmon	Mount Lemmon Survey	·	1.5 km	MPC · JPL
294292	2007 UA_{131}	—	October 20, 2007	Mount Lemmon	Mount Lemmon Survey	TIR	3.8 km	MPC · JPL
294293	2007 UR_{138}	—	October 20, 2007	Catalina	CSS	·	2.9 km	MPC · JPL
294294	2007 VD	—	November 1, 2007	7300	W. K. Y. Yeung	·	1.9 km	MPC · JPL
294295 Brodardmarc	2007 VU	Brodardmarc	November 1, 2007	Marly	P. Kocher	·	1.3 km	MPC · JPL
294296 Efeso	2007 VS_{2}	Efeso	November 3, 2007	Vallemare Borbona	V. S. Casulli	·	890 m	MPC · JPL
294297	2007 VM_{4}	—	November 3, 2007	Costitx	OAM	·	3.5 km	MPC · JPL
294298	2007 VT_{4}	—	November 3, 2007	Kitami	K. Endate	·	2.4 km	MPC · JPL
294299	2007 VQ_{8}	—	November 1, 2007	Kitt Peak	Spacewatch	·	2.0 km	MPC · JPL
294300	2007 VC_{9}	—	November 2, 2007	Mount Lemmon	Mount Lemmon Survey	·	2.4 km	MPC · JPL

== 294301–294400 ==
back to top

Designation			Discovery			Properties		Ref
Permanent	Provisional	Named after	Date	Site	Discoverer(s)	Category	Diam.	Ref
294301	2007 VA_{10}	—	November 5, 2007	Mount Lemmon	Mount Lemmon Survey	·	2.4 km	MPC · JPL
294302	2007 VL_{10}	—	November 3, 2007	Needville	Needville	HOF	3.6 km	MPC · JPL
294303	2007 VM_{11}	—	November 2, 2007	Catalina	CSS	V	770 m	MPC · JPL
294304	2007 VM_{12}	—	November 1, 2007	Kitt Peak	Spacewatch	EOS	2.9 km	MPC · JPL
294305	2007 VU_{19}	—	November 1, 2007	Kitt Peak	Spacewatch	·	780 m	MPC · JPL
294306	2007 VO_{25}	—	November 1, 2007	Kitt Peak	Spacewatch	V	850 m	MPC · JPL
294307	2007 VW_{25}	—	November 2, 2007	Mount Lemmon	Mount Lemmon Survey	·	1.1 km	MPC · JPL
294308	2007 VJ_{27}	—	November 1, 2007	Kitt Peak	Spacewatch	·	2.2 km	MPC · JPL
294309	2007 VV_{27}	—	November 2, 2007	Kitt Peak	Spacewatch	·	870 m	MPC · JPL
294310	2007 VV_{32}	—	November 2, 2007	Kitt Peak	Spacewatch	·	1.6 km	MPC · JPL
294311	2007 VT_{38}	—	November 2, 2007	Catalina	CSS	·	1.1 km	MPC · JPL
294312	2007 VP_{43}	—	November 1, 2007	Kitt Peak	Spacewatch	·	1.5 km	MPC · JPL
294313	2007 VH_{48}	—	November 1, 2007	Kitt Peak	Spacewatch	·	2.1 km	MPC · JPL
294314	2007 VC_{49}	—	November 1, 2007	Kitt Peak	Spacewatch	·	1.9 km	MPC · JPL
294315	2007 VW_{49}	—	November 1, 2007	Kitt Peak	Spacewatch	·	780 m	MPC · JPL
294316	2007 VC_{50}	—	November 1, 2007	Kitt Peak	Spacewatch	·	1.1 km	MPC · JPL
294317	2007 VF_{51}	—	November 1, 2007	Kitt Peak	Spacewatch	·	1.9 km	MPC · JPL
294318	2007 VH_{51}	—	November 1, 2007	Kitt Peak	Spacewatch	AGN	1.6 km	MPC · JPL
294319	2007 VT_{51}	—	November 1, 2007	Kitt Peak	Spacewatch	·	2.3 km	MPC · JPL
294320	2007 VE_{52}	—	November 1, 2007	Kitt Peak	Spacewatch	·	2.3 km	MPC · JPL
294321	2007 VY_{54}	—	November 1, 2007	Kitt Peak	Spacewatch	·	2.3 km	MPC · JPL
294322	2007 VV_{56}	—	November 1, 2007	Kitt Peak	Spacewatch	(2076)	960 m	MPC · JPL
294323	2007 VG_{57}	—	November 1, 2007	Kitt Peak	Spacewatch	VER	2.7 km	MPC · JPL
294324	2007 VQ_{57}	—	November 1, 2007	Kitt Peak	Spacewatch	·	2.5 km	MPC · JPL
294325	2007 VX_{57}	—	November 1, 2007	Kitt Peak	Spacewatch	·	2.1 km	MPC · JPL
294326	2007 VR_{58}	—	November 1, 2007	Kitt Peak	Spacewatch	HOF	3.2 km	MPC · JPL
294327	2007 VL_{62}	—	November 1, 2007	Kitt Peak	Spacewatch	EOS	2.2 km	MPC · JPL
294328	2007 VP_{62}	—	November 1, 2007	Kitt Peak	Spacewatch	·	2.2 km	MPC · JPL
294329	2007 VG_{63}	—	November 1, 2007	Kitt Peak	Spacewatch	·	670 m	MPC · JPL
294330	2007 VK_{64}	—	November 1, 2007	Kitt Peak	Spacewatch	·	2.2 km	MPC · JPL
294331	2007 VG_{66}	—	November 2, 2007	Kitt Peak	Spacewatch	·	2.3 km	MPC · JPL
294332	2007 VS_{72}	—	November 1, 2007	Kitt Peak	Spacewatch	AST	2.2 km	MPC · JPL
294333	2007 VU_{73}	—	November 2, 2007	Purple Mountain	PMO NEO Survey Program	·	870 m	MPC · JPL
294334	2007 VZ_{74}	—	November 3, 2007	Kitt Peak	Spacewatch	·	2.8 km	MPC · JPL
294335	2007 VD_{83}	—	November 4, 2007	Mount Lemmon	Mount Lemmon Survey	THB	4.2 km	MPC · JPL
294336	2007 VZ_{83}	—	November 5, 2007	La Sagra	OAM	·	1.5 km	MPC · JPL
294337	2007 VC_{84}	—	November 7, 2007	Mayhill	Lowe, A.	·	1.7 km	MPC · JPL
294338	2007 VG_{84}	—	November 3, 2007	Catalina	CSS	·	1.9 km	MPC · JPL
294339	2007 VW_{84}	—	November 8, 2007	La Sagra	OAM	(18466)	3.4 km	MPC · JPL
294340	2007 VD_{85}	—	November 2, 2007	Socorro	LINEAR	·	810 m	MPC · JPL
294341	2007 VO_{86}	—	November 2, 2007	Socorro	LINEAR	·	2.5 km	MPC · JPL
294342	2007 VQ_{87}	—	November 2, 2007	Socorro	LINEAR	·	1.3 km	MPC · JPL
294343	2007 VL_{89}	—	November 4, 2007	Socorro	LINEAR	·	3.3 km	MPC · JPL
294344	2007 VY_{89}	—	November 4, 2007	Socorro	LINEAR	LIX	4.6 km	MPC · JPL
294345	2007 VT_{90}	—	November 5, 2007	Socorro	LINEAR	·	1.5 km	MPC · JPL
294346	2007 VB_{91}	—	November 7, 2007	La Sagra	OAM	·	3.7 km	MPC · JPL
294347	2007 VL_{91}	—	November 7, 2007	Calvin-Rehoboth	L. A. Molnar	RAF	1.2 km	MPC · JPL
294348	2007 VV_{91}	—	November 3, 2007	Kitt Peak	Spacewatch	·	2.7 km	MPC · JPL
294349	2007 VC_{92}	—	November 2, 2007	Socorro	LINEAR	·	940 m	MPC · JPL
294350	2007 VR_{94}	—	November 7, 2007	Bisei SG Center	BATTeRS	·	750 m	MPC · JPL
294351	2007 VX_{94}	—	November 8, 2007	Socorro	LINEAR	·	2.6 km	MPC · JPL
294352	2007 VF_{95}	—	November 8, 2007	Socorro	LINEAR	·	1.8 km	MPC · JPL
294353	2007 VQ_{95}	—	November 8, 2007	Socorro	LINEAR	PAD	3.7 km	MPC · JPL
294354	2007 VG_{96}	—	November 9, 2007	Calvin-Rehoboth	L. A. Molnar	·	2.6 km	MPC · JPL
294355	2007 VK_{96}	—	November 3, 2007	Kitt Peak	Spacewatch	·	3.5 km	MPC · JPL
294356	2007 VB_{97}	—	November 1, 2007	Kitt Peak	Spacewatch	WIT	1.1 km	MPC · JPL
294357	2007 VM_{98}	—	November 2, 2007	Kitt Peak	Spacewatch	·	1.0 km	MPC · JPL
294358	2007 VO_{98}	—	November 2, 2007	Kitt Peak	Spacewatch	·	3.4 km	MPC · JPL
294359	2007 VD_{99}	—	November 2, 2007	Catalina	CSS	·	2.2 km	MPC · JPL
294360	2007 VG_{100}	—	November 2, 2007	Kitt Peak	Spacewatch	·	3.4 km	MPC · JPL
294361	2007 VN_{101}	—	November 2, 2007	Kitt Peak	Spacewatch	NYS	1.5 km	MPC · JPL
294362	2007 VP_{102}	—	November 2, 2007	Purple Mountain	PMO NEO Survey Program	·	3.1 km	MPC · JPL
294363	2007 VV_{103}	—	November 3, 2007	Kitt Peak	Spacewatch	·	760 m	MPC · JPL
294364	2007 VM_{107}	—	November 3, 2007	Kitt Peak	Spacewatch	KOR	1.5 km	MPC · JPL
294365	2007 VK_{108}	—	November 3, 2007	Kitt Peak	Spacewatch	·	910 m	MPC · JPL
294366	2007 VD_{109}	—	November 3, 2007	Kitt Peak	Spacewatch	·	2.9 km	MPC · JPL
294367	2007 VW_{110}	—	November 3, 2007	Kitt Peak	Spacewatch	·	2.3 km	MPC · JPL
294368	2007 VM_{112}	—	November 3, 2007	Kitt Peak	Spacewatch	·	1.1 km	MPC · JPL
294369	2007 VF_{117}	—	November 3, 2007	Kitt Peak	Spacewatch	·	4.3 km	MPC · JPL
294370	2007 VR_{117}	—	November 4, 2007	Kitt Peak	Spacewatch	·	2.9 km	MPC · JPL
294371	2007 VZ_{122}	—	November 5, 2007	Mount Lemmon	Mount Lemmon Survey	·	1.8 km	MPC · JPL
294372	2007 VZ_{123}	—	November 5, 2007	Mount Lemmon	Mount Lemmon Survey	KOR	1.6 km	MPC · JPL
294373	2007 VV_{124}	—	November 5, 2007	Mount Lemmon	Mount Lemmon Survey	MAS	950 m	MPC · JPL
294374	2007 VV_{125}	—	November 7, 2007	Bisei SG Center	BATTeRS	·	1.0 km	MPC · JPL
294375	2007 VY_{125}	—	November 9, 2007	7300	W. K. Y. Yeung	·	3.6 km	MPC · JPL
294376	2007 VR_{126}	—	November 11, 2007	Bisei SG Center	BATTeRS	·	1.7 km	MPC · JPL
294377	2007 VO_{132}	—	November 2, 2007	Mount Lemmon	Mount Lemmon Survey	·	2.6 km	MPC · JPL
294378	2007 VU_{132}	—	November 2, 2007	Mount Lemmon	Mount Lemmon Survey	KOR	1.6 km	MPC · JPL
294379	2007 VW_{135}	—	November 3, 2007	Mount Lemmon	Mount Lemmon Survey	·	4.3 km	MPC · JPL
294380	2007 VY_{135}	—	November 4, 2007	Mount Lemmon	Mount Lemmon Survey	KOR	1.3 km	MPC · JPL
294381	2007 VS_{143}	—	November 4, 2007	Kitt Peak	Spacewatch	·	2.4 km	MPC · JPL
294382	2007 VB_{144}	—	November 4, 2007	Kitt Peak	Spacewatch	KOR	1.5 km	MPC · JPL
294383	2007 VD_{144}	—	November 4, 2007	Kitt Peak	Spacewatch	·	770 m	MPC · JPL
294384	2007 VL_{146}	—	November 4, 2007	Kitt Peak	Spacewatch	·	4.3 km	MPC · JPL
294385	2007 VO_{148}	—	November 5, 2007	Purple Mountain	PMO NEO Survey Program	·	1.8 km	MPC · JPL
294386	2007 VM_{149}	—	November 7, 2007	Catalina	CSS	·	1.6 km	MPC · JPL
294387	2007 VH_{151}	—	November 7, 2007	Catalina	CSS	·	880 m	MPC · JPL
294388	2007 VH_{152}	—	November 2, 2007	Kitt Peak	Spacewatch	·	4.6 km	MPC · JPL
294389	2007 VP_{153}	—	November 4, 2007	Kitt Peak	Spacewatch	·	1.9 km	MPC · JPL
294390	2007 VL_{161}	—	November 5, 2007	Kitt Peak	Spacewatch	·	2.5 km	MPC · JPL
294391	2007 VM_{161}	—	November 5, 2007	Kitt Peak	Spacewatch	·	2.0 km	MPC · JPL
294392	2007 VU_{163}	—	November 5, 2007	Kitt Peak	Spacewatch	MRX	1.2 km	MPC · JPL
294393	2007 VL_{164}	—	November 5, 2007	Kitt Peak	Spacewatch	·	2.4 km	MPC · JPL
294394	2007 VN_{165}	—	November 5, 2007	Kitt Peak	Spacewatch	·	2.4 km	MPC · JPL
294395	2007 VQ_{165}	—	November 5, 2007	Kitt Peak	Spacewatch	·	2.7 km	MPC · JPL
294396	2007 VL_{167}	—	November 5, 2007	Kitt Peak	Spacewatch	·	1.7 km	MPC · JPL
294397	2007 VG_{168}	—	November 5, 2007	Kitt Peak	Spacewatch	·	670 m	MPC · JPL
294398	2007 VZ_{168}	—	November 5, 2007	Kitt Peak	Spacewatch	(5)	4.0 km	MPC · JPL
294399	2007 VD_{170}	—	November 6, 2007	Kitt Peak	Spacewatch	EOS	2.5 km	MPC · JPL
294400	2007 VP_{185}	—	November 8, 2007	Catalina	CSS	·	3.9 km	MPC · JPL

== 294401–294500 ==
back to top

Designation			Discovery			Properties		Ref
Permanent	Provisional	Named after	Date	Site	Discoverer(s)	Category	Diam.	Ref
294401	2007 VJ_{188}	—	November 11, 2007	La Sagra	OAM	·	1.5 km	MPC · JPL
294402 Joeorr	2007 VN_{189}	Joeorr	November 11, 2007	Anderson Mesa	Wasserman, L. H.	·	910 m	MPC · JPL
294403	2007 VW_{189}	—	November 14, 2007	La Sagra	OAM	·	750 m	MPC · JPL
294404	2007 VR_{191}	—	November 4, 2007	Mount Lemmon	Mount Lemmon Survey	·	2.0 km	MPC · JPL
294405	2007 VK_{192}	—	November 4, 2007	Mount Lemmon	Mount Lemmon Survey	·	4.6 km	MPC · JPL
294406	2007 VV_{193}	—	November 4, 2007	Mount Lemmon	Mount Lemmon Survey	·	740 m	MPC · JPL
294407	2007 VG_{195}	—	November 7, 2007	Mount Lemmon	Mount Lemmon Survey	·	1.8 km	MPC · JPL
294408	2007 VQ_{195}	—	November 7, 2007	Kitt Peak	Spacewatch	·	1.9 km	MPC · JPL
294409	2007 VB_{199}	—	November 9, 2007	Mount Lemmon	Mount Lemmon Survey	MAS	1.0 km	MPC · JPL
294410	2007 VE_{200}	—	November 9, 2007	Mount Lemmon	Mount Lemmon Survey	·	780 m	MPC · JPL
294411	2007 VQ_{203}	—	November 9, 2007	Kitt Peak	Spacewatch	·	1.2 km	MPC · JPL
294412	2007 VA_{207}	—	November 9, 2007	Catalina	CSS	·	1.6 km	MPC · JPL
294413	2007 VC_{209}	—	November 7, 2007	Kitt Peak	Spacewatch	·	1.6 km	MPC · JPL
294414	2007 VG_{209}	—	November 7, 2007	Kitt Peak	Spacewatch	·	850 m	MPC · JPL
294415	2007 VL_{213}	—	November 9, 2007	Kitt Peak	Spacewatch	·	2.2 km	MPC · JPL
294416	2007 VR_{215}	—	November 9, 2007	Kitt Peak	Spacewatch	·	1.9 km	MPC · JPL
294417	2007 VZ_{215}	—	November 9, 2007	Kitt Peak	Spacewatch	·	4.8 km	MPC · JPL
294418	2007 VC_{217}	—	November 9, 2007	Kitt Peak	Spacewatch	·	2.2 km	MPC · JPL
294419	2007 VQ_{219}	—	November 9, 2007	Kitt Peak	Spacewatch	MIS	3.5 km	MPC · JPL
294420	2007 VG_{220}	—	November 9, 2007	Kitt Peak	Spacewatch	·	1.5 km	MPC · JPL
294421	2007 VQ_{221}	—	November 14, 2007	Bisei SG Center	BATTeRS	·	2.4 km	MPC · JPL
294422	2007 VQ_{223}	—	November 7, 2007	Catalina	CSS	·	2.6 km	MPC · JPL
294423	2007 VF_{227}	—	November 12, 2007	Catalina	CSS	THM	2.8 km	MPC · JPL
294424	2007 VL_{229}	—	November 7, 2007	Kitt Peak	Spacewatch	·	2.1 km	MPC · JPL
294425	2007 VJ_{231}	—	November 7, 2007	Kitt Peak	Spacewatch	·	1.8 km	MPC · JPL
294426	2007 VH_{234}	—	November 9, 2007	Kitt Peak	Spacewatch	KOR	1.5 km	MPC · JPL
294427	2007 VB_{237}	—	November 11, 2007	Mount Lemmon	Mount Lemmon Survey	·	2.5 km	MPC · JPL
294428	2007 VV_{243}	—	November 13, 2007	Dauban	Chante-Perdrix	·	2.9 km	MPC · JPL
294429	2007 VH_{244}	—	November 15, 2007	La Sagra	OAM	·	2.7 km	MPC · JPL
294430	2007 VH_{245}	—	November 14, 2007	Bisei SG Center	BATTeRS	·	890 m	MPC · JPL
294431	2007 VG_{252}	—	November 12, 2007	Catalina	CSS	·	3.1 km	MPC · JPL
294432	2007 VD_{253}	—	November 13, 2007	Mount Lemmon	Mount Lemmon Survey	·	2.6 km	MPC · JPL
294433	2007 VO_{258}	—	November 15, 2007	Mount Lemmon	Mount Lemmon Survey	V	900 m	MPC · JPL
294434	2007 VR_{261}	—	November 13, 2007	Mount Lemmon	Mount Lemmon Survey	·	1.9 km	MPC · JPL
294435	2007 VW_{263}	—	November 13, 2007	Kitt Peak	Spacewatch	·	720 m	MPC · JPL
294436	2007 VB_{264}	—	November 13, 2007	Kitt Peak	Spacewatch	·	820 m	MPC · JPL
294437	2007 VH_{267}	—	November 13, 2007	Cerro Burek	Burek, Cerro	TIR	3.0 km	MPC · JPL
294438	2007 VV_{269}	—	November 15, 2007	Socorro	LINEAR	PHO	3.0 km	MPC · JPL
294439	2007 VE_{274}	—	November 13, 2007	Kitt Peak	Spacewatch	·	3.2 km	MPC · JPL
294440	2007 VR_{277}	—	November 14, 2007	Kitt Peak	Spacewatch	NYS	1.4 km	MPC · JPL
294441	2007 VB_{278}	—	November 14, 2007	Kitt Peak	Spacewatch	·	3.7 km	MPC · JPL
294442	2007 VV_{279}	—	November 14, 2007	Kitt Peak	Spacewatch	MAS	860 m	MPC · JPL
294443	2007 VV_{283}	—	November 14, 2007	Kitt Peak	Spacewatch	KOR	1.5 km	MPC · JPL
294444	2007 VQ_{284}	—	November 14, 2007	Kitt Peak	Spacewatch	·	550 m	MPC · JPL
294445	2007 VH_{285}	—	November 14, 2007	Kitt Peak	Spacewatch	EOS	2.4 km	MPC · JPL
294446	2007 VG_{287}	—	November 15, 2007	Catalina	CSS	(18466)	2.3 km	MPC · JPL
294447	2007 VL_{290}	—	November 14, 2007	Kitt Peak	Spacewatch	·	4.7 km	MPC · JPL
294448	2007 VM_{290}	—	November 14, 2007	Kitt Peak	Spacewatch	·	970 m	MPC · JPL
294449	2007 VQ_{291}	—	November 14, 2007	Kitt Peak	Spacewatch	·	2.3 km	MPC · JPL
294450	2007 VH_{296}	—	November 15, 2007	Anderson Mesa	LONEOS	·	2.0 km	MPC · JPL
294451	2007 VT_{296}	—	November 15, 2007	Mount Lemmon	Mount Lemmon Survey	·	2.7 km	MPC · JPL
294452	2007 VG_{298}	—	November 11, 2007	Catalina	CSS	EUN	1.4 km	MPC · JPL
294453	2007 VP_{299}	—	November 12, 2007	Catalina	CSS	·	2.1 km	MPC · JPL
294454	2007 VR_{303}	—	November 3, 2007	Catalina	CSS	·	2.7 km	MPC · JPL
294455	2007 VE_{306}	—	November 9, 2007	Mount Lemmon	Mount Lemmon Survey	·	3.9 km	MPC · JPL
294456	2007 VJ_{307}	—	November 2, 2007	Catalina	CSS	·	1.9 km	MPC · JPL
294457	2007 VF_{310}	—	November 7, 2007	Kitt Peak	Spacewatch	·	1.7 km	MPC · JPL
294458	2007 VK_{311}	—	November 7, 2007	Kitt Peak	Spacewatch	·	2.8 km	MPC · JPL
294459	2007 VO_{311}	—	November 11, 2007	Mount Lemmon	Mount Lemmon Survey	AGN	1.6 km	MPC · JPL
294460	2007 VR_{311}	—	November 14, 2007	Kitt Peak	Spacewatch	·	2.0 km	MPC · JPL
294461	2007 VT_{312}	—	November 3, 2007	Kitt Peak	Spacewatch	·	1.7 km	MPC · JPL
294462	2007 VO_{315}	—	November 6, 2007	Kitt Peak	Spacewatch	·	3.7 km	MPC · JPL
294463	2007 VE_{316}	—	November 2, 2007	Kitt Peak	Spacewatch	·	1.2 km	MPC · JPL
294464	2007 VG_{316}	—	November 3, 2007	Kitt Peak	Spacewatch	·	1.0 km	MPC · JPL
294465	2007 VO_{316}	—	November 5, 2007	Mount Lemmon	Mount Lemmon Survey	·	750 m	MPC · JPL
294466	2007 VY_{316}	—	November 11, 2007	Mount Lemmon	Mount Lemmon Survey	·	1.7 km	MPC · JPL
294467	2007 VN_{323}	—	November 3, 2007	Mount Lemmon	Mount Lemmon Survey	·	2.4 km	MPC · JPL
294468	2007 VH_{326}	—	November 3, 2007	Kitt Peak	Spacewatch	KOR	1.9 km	MPC · JPL
294469	2007 VA_{327}	—	November 5, 2007	Kitt Peak	Spacewatch	·	1.6 km	MPC · JPL
294470	2007 VD_{327}	—	November 6, 2007	Kitt Peak	Spacewatch	·	2.5 km	MPC · JPL
294471	2007 VR_{327}	—	November 8, 2007	Socorro	LINEAR	·	4.3 km	MPC · JPL
294472	2007 VU_{329}	—	November 2, 2007	Kitt Peak	Spacewatch	·	2.4 km	MPC · JPL
294473	2007 VP_{330}	—	November 3, 2007	Kitt Peak	Spacewatch	TIR	4.6 km	MPC · JPL
294474	2007 VE_{331}	—	November 5, 2007	Mount Lemmon	Mount Lemmon Survey	·	970 m	MPC · JPL
294475	2007 VS_{332}	—	November 8, 2007	Mount Lemmon	Mount Lemmon Survey	·	710 m	MPC · JPL
294476	2007 VY_{332}	—	November 9, 2007	Socorro	LINEAR	·	2.0 km	MPC · JPL
294477	2007 VC_{333}	—	November 9, 2007	Kitt Peak	Spacewatch	·	3.2 km	MPC · JPL
294478	2007 WD	—	November 16, 2007	Mayhill	Lowe, A.	·	2.1 km	MPC · JPL
294479	2007 WC_{2}	—	November 17, 2007	Bisei SG Center	BATTeRS	·	2.8 km	MPC · JPL
294480	2007 WR_{5}	—	November 17, 2007	Socorro	LINEAR	·	3.7 km	MPC · JPL
294481	2007 WL_{6}	—	October 4, 2002	Socorro	LINEAR	·	2.8 km	MPC · JPL
294482	2007 WR_{6}	—	November 18, 2007	Socorro	LINEAR	·	1.8 km	MPC · JPL
294483	2007 WS_{6}	—	November 18, 2007	Socorro	LINEAR	·	780 m	MPC · JPL
294484	2007 WZ_{6}	—	November 18, 2007	Socorro	LINEAR	·	2.7 km	MPC · JPL
294485	2007 WW_{7}	—	November 18, 2007	Socorro	LINEAR	·	3.5 km	MPC · JPL
294486	2007 WR_{8}	—	November 18, 2007	Socorro	LINEAR	·	1.8 km	MPC · JPL
294487	2007 WP_{11}	—	November 17, 2007	Catalina	CSS	(5)	1.8 km	MPC · JPL
294488	2007 WU_{12}	—	November 17, 2007	Bisei SG Center	BATTeRS	·	2.0 km	MPC · JPL
294489	2007 WY_{18}	—	November 18, 2007	Mount Lemmon	Mount Lemmon Survey	·	1.0 km	MPC · JPL
294490	2007 WP_{20}	—	November 18, 2007	Mount Lemmon	Mount Lemmon Survey	·	1.0 km	MPC · JPL
294491	2007 WQ_{23}	—	November 18, 2007	Mount Lemmon	Mount Lemmon Survey	·	840 m	MPC · JPL
294492	2007 WC_{24}	—	November 18, 2007	Mount Lemmon	Mount Lemmon Survey	·	1.6 km	MPC · JPL
294493	2007 WU_{25}	—	November 18, 2007	Mount Lemmon	Mount Lemmon Survey	(5)	1.3 km	MPC · JPL
294494	2007 WN_{26}	—	November 18, 2007	Mount Lemmon	Mount Lemmon Survey	V	910 m	MPC · JPL
294495	2007 WN_{30}	—	November 19, 2007	Kitt Peak	Spacewatch	MRX	1.2 km	MPC · JPL
294496	2007 WU_{35}	—	November 19, 2007	Mount Lemmon	Mount Lemmon Survey	·	2.8 km	MPC · JPL
294497	2007 WC_{55}	—	November 28, 2007	Mayhill	Lowe, A.	T_{j} (2.98) · 3:2	5.5 km	MPC · JPL
294498	2007 WL_{55}	—	November 30, 2007	Lulin	Yang, T.-C., Q. Ye	T_{j} (2.98)	6.2 km	MPC · JPL
294499	2007 WB_{58}	—	November 18, 2007	Mount Lemmon	Mount Lemmon Survey	·	980 m	MPC · JPL
294500	2007 WC_{59}	—	November 17, 2007	Kitt Peak	Spacewatch	·	2.5 km	MPC · JPL

== 294501–294600 ==
back to top

Designation			Discovery			Properties		Ref
Permanent	Provisional	Named after	Date	Site	Discoverer(s)	Category	Diam.	Ref
294501	2007 WT_{59}	—	November 18, 2007	Kitt Peak	Spacewatch	·	1.6 km	MPC · JPL
294502	2007 WY_{62}	—	November 19, 2007	Mount Lemmon	Mount Lemmon Survey	·	860 m	MPC · JPL
294503	2007 XB	—	December 1, 2007	Bisei SG Center	BATTeRS	·	1.4 km	MPC · JPL
294504	2007 XC	—	December 1, 2007	Bisei SG Center	BATTeRS	·	1.8 km	MPC · JPL
294505	2007 XG	—	December 1, 2007	Bisei SG Center	BATTeRS	·	1.1 km	MPC · JPL
294506	2007 XB_{1}	—	December 2, 2007	Lulin	LUSS	·	820 m	MPC · JPL
294507	2007 XS_{2}	—	December 3, 2007	Kitt Peak	Spacewatch	·	2.1 km	MPC · JPL
294508	2007 XV_{3}	—	December 1, 2007	Lulin	LUSS	·	3.8 km	MPC · JPL
294509	2007 XG_{4}	—	December 3, 2007	Catalina	CSS	GEF	1.7 km	MPC · JPL
294510	2007 XL_{6}	—	December 4, 2007	Catalina	CSS	·	3.5 km	MPC · JPL
294511	2007 XO_{10}	—	December 3, 2007	Eskridge	G. Hug	·	2.2 km	MPC · JPL
294512	2007 XS_{10}	—	December 5, 2007	Pla D'Arguines	R. Ferrando	·	660 m	MPC · JPL
294513	2007 XQ_{13}	—	December 4, 2007	Anderson Mesa	LONEOS	MAR	1.7 km	MPC · JPL
294514	2007 XC_{14}	—	December 5, 2007	Kitt Peak	Spacewatch	·	2.2 km	MPC · JPL
294515	2007 XD_{14}	—	December 5, 2007	Kitt Peak	Spacewatch	·	3.1 km	MPC · JPL
294516	2007 XS_{15}	—	December 8, 2007	Bisei SG Center	BATTeRS	·	840 m	MPC · JPL
294517	2007 XV_{15}	—	December 8, 2007	La Sagra	OAM	·	1.1 km	MPC · JPL
294518	2007 XB_{16}	—	December 6, 2007	Catalina	CSS	H	810 m	MPC · JPL
294519	2007 XB_{18}	—	December 12, 2007	Great Shefford	Birtwhistle, P.	VER	4.3 km	MPC · JPL
294520	2007 XX_{18}	—	December 12, 2007	Socorro	LINEAR	EOS	2.7 km	MPC · JPL
294521	2007 XO_{24}	—	December 13, 2007	Socorro	LINEAR	·	990 m	MPC · JPL
294522	2007 XK_{25}	—	December 15, 2007	La Sagra	OAM	·	4.3 km	MPC · JPL
294523	2007 XU_{25}	—	December 14, 2007	Mount Lemmon	Mount Lemmon Survey	EOS	2.5 km	MPC · JPL
294524	2007 XU_{29}	—	December 15, 2007	Catalina	CSS	·	810 m	MPC · JPL
294525	2007 XZ_{29}	—	December 15, 2007	Catalina	CSS	(2076)	1.1 km	MPC · JPL
294526	2007 XQ_{30}	—	January 8, 2005	Campo Imperatore	CINEOS	·	850 m	MPC · JPL
294527	2007 XG_{32}	—	December 15, 2007	Catalina	CSS	·	2.9 km	MPC · JPL
294528	2007 XN_{32}	—	December 15, 2007	Catalina	CSS	EOS	2.8 km	MPC · JPL
294529	2007 XC_{33}	—	December 15, 2007	Mount Lemmon	Mount Lemmon Survey	·	910 m	MPC · JPL
294530	2007 XN_{33}	—	December 10, 2007	Socorro	LINEAR	·	1.6 km	MPC · JPL
294531	2007 XR_{34}	—	December 13, 2007	Socorro	LINEAR	·	1.1 km	MPC · JPL
294532	2007 XU_{41}	—	December 15, 2007	Socorro	LINEAR	·	3.0 km	MPC · JPL
294533	2007 XH_{48}	—	December 15, 2007	Kitt Peak	Spacewatch	·	1.3 km	MPC · JPL
294534	2007 XL_{49}	—	December 15, 2007	Kitt Peak	Spacewatch	·	1.5 km	MPC · JPL
294535	2007 XF_{51}	—	December 14, 2007	Mount Lemmon	Mount Lemmon Survey	·	4.0 km	MPC · JPL
294536	2007 XM_{51}	—	December 4, 2007	Mount Lemmon	Mount Lemmon Survey	·	1.7 km	MPC · JPL
294537	2007 XA_{54}	—	December 3, 2007	Kitt Peak	Spacewatch	KOR	1.7 km	MPC · JPL
294538	2007 XD_{54}	—	December 4, 2007	Kitt Peak	Spacewatch	·	830 m	MPC · JPL
294539	2007 XH_{54}	—	December 4, 2007	Kitt Peak	Spacewatch	·	2.7 km	MPC · JPL
294540	2007 XD_{58}	—	December 5, 2007	Kitt Peak	Spacewatch	(43176)	3.8 km	MPC · JPL
294541	2007 XR_{59}	—	December 15, 2007	Mount Lemmon	Mount Lemmon Survey	·	3.4 km	MPC · JPL
294542	2007 YU	—	December 16, 2007	Bergisch Gladbach	W. Bickel	·	780 m	MPC · JPL
294543	2007 YN_{2}	—	December 18, 2007	Vicques	M. Ory	·	2.4 km	MPC · JPL
294544	2007 YH_{7}	—	January 15, 2001	Kitt Peak	Spacewatch	·	1.2 km	MPC · JPL
294545	2007 YB_{8}	—	December 16, 2007	Kitt Peak	Spacewatch	NYS	1.5 km	MPC · JPL
294546	2007 YX_{10}	—	December 16, 2007	Anderson Mesa	LONEOS	·	2.6 km	MPC · JPL
294547	2007 YU_{13}	—	December 17, 2007	Mount Lemmon	Mount Lemmon Survey	·	860 m	MPC · JPL
294548	2007 YJ_{14}	—	December 17, 2007	Mount Lemmon	Mount Lemmon Survey	·	3.3 km	MPC · JPL
294549	2007 YM_{18}	—	December 16, 2007	Kitt Peak	Spacewatch	·	1.1 km	MPC · JPL
294550	2007 YJ_{20}	—	December 16, 2007	Kitt Peak	Spacewatch	VER	3.5 km	MPC · JPL
294551	2007 YP_{22}	—	December 16, 2007	Kitt Peak	Spacewatch	·	990 m	MPC · JPL
294552	2007 YG_{23}	—	December 16, 2007	Anderson Mesa	LONEOS	·	2.0 km	MPC · JPL
294553	2007 YD_{27}	—	December 18, 2007	Mount Lemmon	Mount Lemmon Survey	·	5.1 km	MPC · JPL
294554	2007 YE_{28}	—	December 18, 2007	Mount Lemmon	Mount Lemmon Survey	EOS	2.5 km	MPC · JPL
294555	2007 YZ_{28}	—	December 19, 2007	Kitt Peak	Spacewatch	·	1.8 km	MPC · JPL
294556	2007 YJ_{30}	—	December 28, 2007	Kitt Peak	Spacewatch	·	1.5 km	MPC · JPL
294557	2007 YK_{30}	—	December 28, 2007	Kitt Peak	Spacewatch	·	1.2 km	MPC · JPL
294558	2007 YH_{32}	—	December 28, 2007	Kitt Peak	Spacewatch	·	800 m	MPC · JPL
294559	2007 YR_{34}	—	December 28, 2007	Kitt Peak	Spacewatch	·	1.6 km	MPC · JPL
294560	2007 YY_{37}	—	December 30, 2007	Mount Lemmon	Mount Lemmon Survey	·	5.0 km	MPC · JPL
294561	2007 YP_{41}	—	December 30, 2007	Kitt Peak	Spacewatch	·	2.0 km	MPC · JPL
294562	2007 YY_{42}	—	December 30, 2007	Catalina	CSS	·	1.3 km	MPC · JPL
294563	2007 YU_{44}	—	December 30, 2007	Kitt Peak	Spacewatch	MAS	730 m	MPC · JPL
294564	2007 YA_{46}	—	December 30, 2007	Mount Lemmon	Mount Lemmon Survey	·	1.8 km	MPC · JPL
294565	2007 YD_{46}	—	December 30, 2007	Kitt Peak	Spacewatch	CLA	1.4 km	MPC · JPL
294566	2007 YJ_{46}	—	December 30, 2007	Kitt Peak	Spacewatch	·	2.0 km	MPC · JPL
294567	2007 YK_{47}	—	December 30, 2007	Kitt Peak	Spacewatch	·	3.0 km	MPC · JPL
294568	2007 YP_{47}	—	December 29, 2007	Great Shefford	Birtwhistle, P.	AGN	1.7 km	MPC · JPL
294569	2007 YH_{49}	—	December 28, 2007	Kitt Peak	Spacewatch	·	1.2 km	MPC · JPL
294570	2007 YU_{49}	—	December 28, 2007	Kitt Peak	Spacewatch	·	910 m	MPC · JPL
294571	2007 YW_{49}	—	December 28, 2007	Kitt Peak	Spacewatch	·	2.2 km	MPC · JPL
294572	2007 YW_{50}	—	December 28, 2007	Kitt Peak	Spacewatch	(12739)	2.3 km	MPC · JPL
294573	2007 YA_{51}	—	December 28, 2007	Kitt Peak	Spacewatch	EOS	2.0 km	MPC · JPL
294574	2007 YC_{52}	—	December 30, 2007	Kitt Peak	Spacewatch	·	2.3 km	MPC · JPL
294575	2007 YA_{53}	—	December 30, 2007	Kitt Peak	Spacewatch	MAS	630 m	MPC · JPL
294576	2007 YQ_{54}	—	December 31, 2007	Catalina	CSS	·	3.6 km	MPC · JPL
294577	2007 YS_{55}	—	December 31, 2007	Mount Lemmon	Mount Lemmon Survey	·	1.2 km	MPC · JPL
294578	2007 YA_{57}	—	December 31, 2007	Bisei SG Center	BATTeRS	·	860 m	MPC · JPL
294579	2007 YB_{57}	—	December 30, 2007	Kitt Peak	Spacewatch	·	2.5 km	MPC · JPL
294580	2007 YA_{60}	—	December 18, 2007	Catalina	CSS	·	4.6 km	MPC · JPL
294581	2007 YB_{62}	—	December 18, 2007	Mount Lemmon	Mount Lemmon Survey	NEM	2.4 km	MPC · JPL
294582	2007 YL_{62}	—	December 30, 2007	Kitt Peak	Spacewatch	EMA	4.7 km	MPC · JPL
294583	2007 YC_{65}	—	December 31, 2007	Kitt Peak	Spacewatch	·	4.0 km	MPC · JPL
294584	2007 YP_{65}	—	December 31, 2007	Kitt Peak	Spacewatch	·	1.0 km	MPC · JPL
294585	2007 YG_{66}	—	December 30, 2007	Mount Lemmon	Mount Lemmon Survey	·	1.1 km	MPC · JPL
294586	2007 YU_{66}	—	December 30, 2007	Kitt Peak	Spacewatch	·	1.4 km	MPC · JPL
294587	2007 YL_{67}	—	December 16, 2007	Kitt Peak	Spacewatch	·	2.8 km	MPC · JPL
294588	2007 YF_{68}	—	December 30, 2007	Kitt Peak	Spacewatch	EOS	2.5 km	MPC · JPL
294589	2007 YN_{68}	—	December 31, 2007	Kitt Peak	Spacewatch	AGN	1.4 km	MPC · JPL
294590	2007 YP_{70}	—	December 16, 2007	La Cañada	Lacruz, J.	·	1.5 km	MPC · JPL
294591	2007 YE_{71}	—	December 16, 2007	Socorro	LINEAR	·	4.1 km	MPC · JPL
294592	2007 YY_{71}	—	December 18, 2007	Mount Lemmon	Mount Lemmon Survey	VER	3.7 km	MPC · JPL
294593	2007 YD_{72}	—	December 18, 2007	Mount Lemmon	Mount Lemmon Survey	URS	3.4 km	MPC · JPL
294594	2007 YM_{72}	—	December 18, 2007	Mount Lemmon	Mount Lemmon Survey	·	4.1 km	MPC · JPL
294595 Shingareva	2008 AH_{1}	Shingareva	January 6, 2008	Zelenchukskaya Stn	T. V. Krjačko	VER	4.8 km	MPC · JPL
294596	2008 AV_{1}	—	January 8, 2008	Dauban	Kugel, F.	LUT	7.4 km	MPC · JPL
294597	2008 AY_{1}	—	January 5, 2008	Mayhill	Lowe, A.	JUN	4.0 km	MPC · JPL
294598	2008 AH_{2}	—	January 4, 2008	Lulin	LUSS	·	3.1 km	MPC · JPL
294599	2008 AV_{2}	—	January 5, 2008	Purple Mountain	PMO NEO Survey Program	·	4.8 km	MPC · JPL
294600 Abedinabedin	2008 AA_{3}	Abedinabedin	January 7, 2008	Lulin	Q. Ye, Lin, C.-S.	·	3.6 km	MPC · JPL

== 294601–294700 ==
back to top

Designation			Discovery			Properties		Ref
Permanent	Provisional	Named after	Date	Site	Discoverer(s)	Category	Diam.	Ref
294601	2008 AZ_{3}	—	January 8, 2008	Dauban	Kugel, F.	·	2.1 km	MPC · JPL
294602	2008 AR_{5}	—	January 10, 2008	Mount Lemmon	Mount Lemmon Survey	·	2.0 km	MPC · JPL
294603	2008 AJ_{8}	—	January 10, 2008	Kitt Peak	Spacewatch	V	630 m	MPC · JPL
294604	2008 AS_{8}	—	January 10, 2008	Kitt Peak	Spacewatch	KON	2.9 km	MPC · JPL
294605	2008 AT_{11}	—	January 10, 2008	Mount Lemmon	Mount Lemmon Survey	·	1.1 km	MPC · JPL
294606	2008 AM_{12}	—	January 10, 2008	Mount Lemmon	Mount Lemmon Survey	·	1.5 km	MPC · JPL
294607	2008 AT_{12}	—	January 10, 2008	Mount Lemmon	Mount Lemmon Survey	·	2.6 km	MPC · JPL
294608	2008 AW_{13}	—	January 10, 2008	Mount Lemmon	Mount Lemmon Survey	·	1.1 km	MPC · JPL
294609	2008 AF_{15}	—	January 10, 2008	Kitt Peak	Spacewatch	·	1.6 km	MPC · JPL
294610	2008 AG_{18}	—	January 10, 2008	Kitt Peak	Spacewatch	·	1.5 km	MPC · JPL
294611	2008 AV_{19}	—	January 10, 2008	Mount Lemmon	Mount Lemmon Survey	·	1.2 km	MPC · JPL
294612	2008 AL_{22}	—	January 10, 2008	Mount Lemmon	Mount Lemmon Survey	·	900 m	MPC · JPL
294613	2008 AW_{23}	—	January 10, 2008	Mount Lemmon	Mount Lemmon Survey	V	870 m	MPC · JPL
294614	2008 AM_{24}	—	January 10, 2008	Mount Lemmon	Mount Lemmon Survey	·	1.0 km	MPC · JPL
294615	2008 AM_{26}	—	January 10, 2008	Mount Lemmon	Mount Lemmon Survey	·	2.7 km	MPC · JPL
294616	2008 AK_{27}	—	January 10, 2008	Mount Lemmon	Mount Lemmon Survey	KOR	1.6 km	MPC · JPL
294617	2008 AC_{28}	—	January 10, 2008	Mount Lemmon	Mount Lemmon Survey	·	970 m	MPC · JPL
294618	2008 AJ_{29}	—	January 10, 2008	Desert Eagle	W. K. Y. Yeung	·	1.0 km	MPC · JPL
294619	2008 AG_{31}	—	January 10, 2008	Bergisch Gladbach	W. Bickel	·	4.0 km	MPC · JPL
294620	2008 AN_{32}	—	January 12, 2008	Bisei SG Center	BATTeRS	·	3.6 km	MPC · JPL
294621	2008 AQ_{34}	—	January 10, 2008	Kitt Peak	Spacewatch	·	3.8 km	MPC · JPL
294622	2008 AB_{35}	—	January 10, 2008	Kitt Peak	Spacewatch	·	1.3 km	MPC · JPL
294623	2008 AC_{35}	—	January 10, 2008	Kitt Peak	Spacewatch	·	1.5 km	MPC · JPL
294624	2008 AR_{36}	—	January 10, 2008	Kitt Peak	Spacewatch	·	560 m	MPC · JPL
294625	2008 AS_{38}	—	January 10, 2008	Kitt Peak	Spacewatch	·	2.0 km	MPC · JPL
294626	2008 AJ_{40}	—	January 10, 2008	Mount Lemmon	Mount Lemmon Survey	EOS	3.8 km	MPC · JPL
294627	2008 AM_{40}	—	January 10, 2008	Mount Lemmon	Mount Lemmon Survey	·	1.4 km	MPC · JPL
294628	2008 AP_{42}	—	January 10, 2008	Catalina	CSS	VER	3.9 km	MPC · JPL
294629	2008 AG_{43}	—	January 10, 2008	Catalina	CSS	·	860 m	MPC · JPL
294630	2008 AL_{44}	—	January 10, 2008	Kitt Peak	Spacewatch	·	750 m	MPC · JPL
294631	2008 AP_{44}	—	January 10, 2008	Kitt Peak	Spacewatch	MIS	2.9 km	MPC · JPL
294632	2008 AO_{45}	—	January 10, 2008	Lulin	LUSS	HYG	3.1 km	MPC · JPL
294633	2008 AU_{46}	—	January 11, 2008	Kitt Peak	Spacewatch	·	1.4 km	MPC · JPL
294634	2008 AB_{48}	—	January 11, 2008	Kitt Peak	Spacewatch	·	2.5 km	MPC · JPL
294635	2008 AS_{49}	—	January 11, 2008	Kitt Peak	Spacewatch	·	2.9 km	MPC · JPL
294636	2008 AH_{50}	—	January 11, 2008	Kitt Peak	Spacewatch	MAS	650 m	MPC · JPL
294637	2008 AW_{51}	—	January 11, 2008	Kitt Peak	Spacewatch	·	1.3 km	MPC · JPL
294638	2008 AW_{52}	—	January 11, 2008	Kitt Peak	Spacewatch	·	1.9 km	MPC · JPL
294639	2008 AS_{53}	—	January 11, 2008	Kitt Peak	Spacewatch	·	1.6 km	MPC · JPL
294640	2008 AT_{54}	—	January 11, 2008	Kitt Peak	Spacewatch	V	700 m	MPC · JPL
294641	2008 AQ_{55}	—	January 11, 2008	Kitt Peak	Spacewatch	·	2.6 km	MPC · JPL
294642	2008 AZ_{58}	—	January 11, 2008	Kitt Peak	Spacewatch	·	1.0 km	MPC · JPL
294643	2008 AA_{59}	—	January 11, 2008	Kitt Peak	Spacewatch	·	2.7 km	MPC · JPL
294644	2008 AC_{59}	—	January 11, 2008	Kitt Peak	Spacewatch	·	4.4 km	MPC · JPL
294645	2008 AG_{63}	—	January 11, 2008	Mount Lemmon	Mount Lemmon Survey	·	1.2 km	MPC · JPL
294646	2008 AL_{67}	—	January 11, 2008	Kitt Peak	Spacewatch	·	1.8 km	MPC · JPL
294647	2008 AK_{69}	—	January 11, 2008	Kitt Peak	Spacewatch	·	840 m	MPC · JPL
294648	2008 AS_{71}	—	January 13, 2008	Kitt Peak	Spacewatch	VER	5.3 km	MPC · JPL
294649	2008 AL_{73}	—	January 10, 2008	Kitt Peak	Spacewatch	·	3.1 km	MPC · JPL
294650	2008 AR_{73}	—	January 10, 2008	Kitt Peak	Spacewatch	NYS	1.3 km	MPC · JPL
294651	2008 AF_{74}	—	January 10, 2008	Kitt Peak	Spacewatch	AGN	1.5 km	MPC · JPL
294652	2008 AV_{74}	—	January 11, 2008	Kitt Peak	Spacewatch	·	2.5 km	MPC · JPL
294653	2008 AU_{78}	—	January 12, 2008	Kitt Peak	Spacewatch	NEM	2.4 km	MPC · JPL
294654	2008 AJ_{79}	—	January 12, 2008	Kitt Peak	Spacewatch	·	610 m	MPC · JPL
294655	2008 AJ_{80}	—	January 12, 2008	Kitt Peak	Spacewatch	·	2.0 km	MPC · JPL
294656	2008 AO_{81}	—	January 13, 2008	Mount Lemmon	Mount Lemmon Survey	·	2.2 km	MPC · JPL
294657	2008 AY_{81}	—	January 13, 2008	Mount Lemmon	Mount Lemmon Survey	·	1.1 km	MPC · JPL
294658	2008 AO_{82}	—	January 14, 2008	Kitt Peak	Spacewatch	·	5.6 km	MPC · JPL
294659	2008 AZ_{83}	—	January 15, 2008	Mount Lemmon	Mount Lemmon Survey	·	1.7 km	MPC · JPL
294660	2008 AV_{84}	—	January 12, 2008	Bisei SG Center	BATTeRS	·	4.7 km	MPC · JPL
294661	2008 AD_{85}	—	January 13, 2008	Kitt Peak	Spacewatch	EOS	2.8 km	MPC · JPL
294662	2008 AO_{85}	—	January 13, 2008	Kitt Peak	Spacewatch	MAS	700 m	MPC · JPL
294663	2008 AC_{86}	—	January 13, 2008	Kitt Peak	Spacewatch	AGN	1.6 km	MPC · JPL
294664 Trakai	2008 AL_{86}	Trakai	January 3, 2008	Baldone	K. Černis, I. Eglītis	·	3.8 km	MPC · JPL
294665	2008 AA_{87}	—	January 12, 2008	Mount Lemmon	Mount Lemmon Survey	·	830 m	MPC · JPL
294666	2008 AX_{87}	—	January 13, 2008	Kitt Peak	Spacewatch	·	2.4 km	MPC · JPL
294667	2008 AB_{90}	—	January 13, 2008	Kitt Peak	Spacewatch	EOS	2.4 km	MPC · JPL
294668	2008 AN_{95}	—	January 14, 2008	Kitt Peak	Spacewatch	·	1.1 km	MPC · JPL
294669	2008 AB_{96}	—	January 14, 2008	Kitt Peak	Spacewatch	·	2.9 km	MPC · JPL
294670	2008 AX_{96}	—	January 14, 2008	Kitt Peak	Spacewatch	·	3.6 km	MPC · JPL
294671	2008 AJ_{98}	—	January 14, 2008	Kitt Peak	Spacewatch	RAF	1.4 km	MPC · JPL
294672	2008 AP_{100}	—	January 14, 2008	Kitt Peak	Spacewatch	·	1.4 km	MPC · JPL
294673	2008 AC_{102}	—	January 12, 2008	Kitt Peak	Spacewatch	·	1.8 km	MPC · JPL
294674	2008 AK_{103}	—	January 15, 2008	Mount Lemmon	Mount Lemmon Survey	EOS	2.9 km	MPC · JPL
294675	2008 AM_{104}	—	January 15, 2008	Kitt Peak	Spacewatch	·	2.5 km	MPC · JPL
294676	2008 AJ_{105}	—	January 15, 2008	Mount Lemmon	Mount Lemmon Survey	·	1.5 km	MPC · JPL
294677	2008 AS_{105}	—	January 15, 2008	Mount Lemmon	Mount Lemmon Survey	·	1.8 km	MPC · JPL
294678	2008 AZ_{105}	—	January 15, 2008	Mount Lemmon	Mount Lemmon Survey	·	810 m	MPC · JPL
294679	2008 AC_{106}	—	January 15, 2008	Mount Lemmon	Mount Lemmon Survey	VER	3.2 km	MPC · JPL
294680	2008 AT_{106}	—	January 15, 2008	Kitt Peak	Spacewatch	·	1.7 km	MPC · JPL
294681	2008 AO_{107}	—	January 15, 2008	Kitt Peak	Spacewatch	·	2.7 km	MPC · JPL
294682	2008 AC_{108}	—	January 15, 2008	Kitt Peak	Spacewatch	·	4.5 km	MPC · JPL
294683	2008 AG_{108}	—	January 15, 2008	Kitt Peak	Spacewatch	·	1.1 km	MPC · JPL
294684	2008 AD_{114}	—	January 11, 2008	Kitt Peak	Spacewatch	·	1.4 km	MPC · JPL
294685	2008 AF_{114}	—	January 11, 2008	Kitt Peak	Spacewatch	3:2	6.3 km	MPC · JPL
294686	2008 AM_{114}	—	January 11, 2008	Mount Lemmon	Mount Lemmon Survey	·	1.5 km	MPC · JPL
294687	2008 AS_{114}	—	January 11, 2008	Kitt Peak	Spacewatch	·	1.3 km	MPC · JPL
294688	2008 AD_{115}	—	January 9, 2008	Mount Lemmon	Mount Lemmon Survey	NYS	1.3 km	MPC · JPL
294689	2008 AG_{115}	—	January 10, 2008	Mount Lemmon	Mount Lemmon Survey	·	5.9 km	MPC · JPL
294690	2008 AB_{129}	—	January 12, 2008	Kitt Peak	Spacewatch	·	930 m	MPC · JPL
294691	2008 AZ_{134}	—	August 28, 2006	Kitt Peak	Spacewatch	·	2.2 km	MPC · JPL
294692	2008 AC_{135}	—	January 11, 2008	Catalina	CSS	·	1.9 km	MPC · JPL
294693	2008 AG_{135}	—	January 11, 2008	Catalina	CSS	·	3.4 km	MPC · JPL
294694	2008 AU_{136}	—	January 13, 2008	Kitt Peak	Spacewatch	·	930 m	MPC · JPL
294695	2008 AP_{137}	—	January 10, 2008	Mount Lemmon	Mount Lemmon Survey	·	1.7 km	MPC · JPL
294696	2008 BS	—	January 16, 2008	Mount Lemmon	Mount Lemmon Survey	·	2.2 km	MPC · JPL
294697	2008 BT_{1}	—	January 16, 2008	Kitt Peak	Spacewatch	·	4.3 km	MPC · JPL
294698	2008 BJ_{2}	—	January 18, 2008	Pla D'Arguines	R. Ferrando	·	840 m	MPC · JPL
294699	2008 BT_{3}	—	January 16, 2008	Kitt Peak	Spacewatch	·	1.8 km	MPC · JPL
294700	2008 BH_{4}	—	January 16, 2008	Kitt Peak	Spacewatch	·	2.2 km	MPC · JPL

== 294701–294800 ==
back to top

Designation			Discovery			Properties		Ref
Permanent	Provisional	Named after	Date	Site	Discoverer(s)	Category	Diam.	Ref
294701	2008 BG_{6}	—	January 16, 2008	Kitt Peak	Spacewatch	·	670 m	MPC · JPL
294702	2008 BR_{7}	—	January 16, 2008	Mount Lemmon	Mount Lemmon Survey	·	6.0 km	MPC · JPL
294703	2008 BA_{8}	—	January 16, 2008	Kitt Peak	Spacewatch	·	630 m	MPC · JPL
294704	2008 BJ_{8}	—	January 16, 2008	Kitt Peak	Spacewatch	·	1.4 km	MPC · JPL
294705	2008 BY_{14}	—	January 29, 2008	Wildberg	R. Apitzsch	MAS	780 m	MPC · JPL
294706	2008 BS_{15}	—	January 28, 2008	Lulin	LUSS	·	670 m	MPC · JPL
294707	2008 BU_{16}	—	January 29, 2008	La Sagra	OAM	·	2.9 km	MPC · JPL
294708	2008 BZ_{18}	—	January 29, 2008	La Sagra	OAM	·	5.2 km	MPC · JPL
294709	2008 BR_{19}	—	January 30, 2008	Kitt Peak	Spacewatch	EOS	2.3 km	MPC · JPL
294710	2008 BC_{21}	—	January 30, 2008	Mount Lemmon	Mount Lemmon Survey	·	2.5 km	MPC · JPL
294711	2008 BG_{21}	—	January 30, 2008	Mount Lemmon	Mount Lemmon Survey	·	1.5 km	MPC · JPL
294712	2008 BU_{21}	—	January 30, 2008	Mount Lemmon	Mount Lemmon Survey	NYS	1.1 km	MPC · JPL
294713	2008 BQ_{22}	—	January 31, 2008	Mount Lemmon	Mount Lemmon Survey	·	1.0 km	MPC · JPL
294714	2008 BP_{23}	—	January 31, 2008	Mount Lemmon	Mount Lemmon Survey	·	2.2 km	MPC · JPL
294715	2008 BZ_{25}	—	January 30, 2008	Kitt Peak	Spacewatch	·	2.1 km	MPC · JPL
294716	2008 BU_{27}	—	January 30, 2008	Catalina	CSS	·	3.9 km	MPC · JPL
294717	2008 BJ_{31}	—	January 30, 2008	Mount Lemmon	Mount Lemmon Survey	·	1.1 km	MPC · JPL
294718	2008 BM_{31}	—	January 30, 2008	Mount Lemmon	Mount Lemmon Survey	·	2.6 km	MPC · JPL
294719	2008 BB_{32}	—	January 30, 2008	Mount Lemmon	Mount Lemmon Survey	HOF	3.2 km	MPC · JPL
294720	2008 BN_{32}	—	January 30, 2008	Catalina	CSS	·	2.7 km	MPC · JPL
294721	2008 BX_{34}	—	January 30, 2008	Mount Lemmon	Mount Lemmon Survey	·	4.7 km	MPC · JPL
294722	2008 BC_{36}	—	January 30, 2008	Kitt Peak	Spacewatch	·	2.2 km	MPC · JPL
294723	2008 BR_{37}	—	January 31, 2008	Catalina	CSS	EUP	4.6 km	MPC · JPL
294724	2008 BJ_{38}	—	January 31, 2008	Mount Lemmon	Mount Lemmon Survey	·	2.1 km	MPC · JPL
294725	2008 BV_{40}	—	January 30, 2008	La Sagra	OAM	·	4.5 km	MPC · JPL
294726	2008 BX_{40}	—	January 29, 2008	La Sagra	OAM	·	1.5 km	MPC · JPL
294727 Dennisritchie	2008 BV_{41}	Dennisritchie	January 31, 2008	Vail-Jarnac	Glinos, T., D. H. Levy	·	4.4 km	MPC · JPL
294728	2008 BY_{41}	—	January 31, 2008	Catalina	CSS	V	750 m	MPC · JPL
294729	2008 BR_{46}	—	January 30, 2008	Mount Lemmon	Mount Lemmon Survey	·	2.4 km	MPC · JPL
294730	2008 BX_{46}	—	January 30, 2008	Kitt Peak	Spacewatch	·	2.3 km	MPC · JPL
294731	2008 BL_{47}	—	January 30, 2008	Mount Lemmon	Mount Lemmon Survey	·	2.5 km	MPC · JPL
294732	2008 BM_{47}	—	January 30, 2008	Mount Lemmon	Mount Lemmon Survey	(1338) (FLO)	810 m	MPC · JPL
294733	2008 BS_{47}	—	January 19, 2008	Kitt Peak	Spacewatch	EUN	1.7 km	MPC · JPL
294734	2008 BK_{48}	—	January 18, 2008	Mount Lemmon	Mount Lemmon Survey	·	2.1 km	MPC · JPL
294735	2008 BX_{48}	—	January 30, 2008	Mount Lemmon	Mount Lemmon Survey	·	1.1 km	MPC · JPL
294736	2008 BA_{49}	—	January 30, 2008	Mount Lemmon	Mount Lemmon Survey	·	1.7 km	MPC · JPL
294737	2008 BB_{49}	—	January 30, 2008	Mount Lemmon	Mount Lemmon Survey	KOR	1.6 km	MPC · JPL
294738	2008 BB_{53}	—	January 18, 2008	Kitt Peak	Spacewatch	·	2.4 km	MPC · JPL
294739	2008 CM	—	February 2, 2008	Catalina	CSS	APO +1km · PHA	740 m	MPC · JPL
294740	2008 CO_{1}	—	February 2, 2008	Kitami	K. Endate	·	2.0 km	MPC · JPL
294741	2008 CX_{1}	—	February 2, 2008	Junk Bond	D. Healy	ERI	1.8 km	MPC · JPL
294742	2008 CV_{2}	—	February 1, 2008	Mount Lemmon	Mount Lemmon Survey	·	730 m	MPC · JPL
294743	2008 CZ_{3}	—	February 2, 2008	Mount Lemmon	Mount Lemmon Survey	·	3.1 km	MPC · JPL
294744	2008 CW_{4}	—	February 3, 2008	Socorro	LINEAR	3:2	5.3 km	MPC · JPL
294745	2008 CG_{5}	—	February 2, 2008	Mount Lemmon	Mount Lemmon Survey	·	1.5 km	MPC · JPL
294746	2008 CJ_{8}	—	February 2, 2008	Kitt Peak	Spacewatch	·	2.2 km	MPC · JPL
294747	2008 CF_{9}	—	February 2, 2008	Mount Lemmon	Mount Lemmon Survey	·	1.6 km	MPC · JPL
294748	2008 CR_{11}	—	February 3, 2008	Kitt Peak	Spacewatch	(5)	1.3 km	MPC · JPL
294749	2008 CM_{12}	—	February 3, 2008	Kitt Peak	Spacewatch	·	1.7 km	MPC · JPL
294750	2008 CQ_{12}	—	February 3, 2008	Kitt Peak	Spacewatch	·	880 m	MPC · JPL
294751	2008 CQ_{13}	—	February 3, 2008	Kitt Peak	Spacewatch	·	1.2 km	MPC · JPL
294752	2008 CS_{13}	—	February 3, 2008	Kitt Peak	Spacewatch	·	1.3 km	MPC · JPL
294753	2008 CP_{16}	—	February 3, 2008	Kitt Peak	Spacewatch	·	890 m	MPC · JPL
294754	2008 CE_{17}	—	February 3, 2008	Kitt Peak	Spacewatch	·	3.3 km	MPC · JPL
294755	2008 CM_{17}	—	February 3, 2008	Kitt Peak	Spacewatch	MRX	1.3 km	MPC · JPL
294756	2008 CR_{17}	—	February 3, 2008	Kitt Peak	Spacewatch	NEM	2.4 km	MPC · JPL
294757	2008 CQ_{19}	—	February 6, 2008	Anderson Mesa	LONEOS	·	4.9 km	MPC · JPL
294758	2008 CU_{20}	—	February 7, 2008	Socorro	LINEAR	·	2.5 km	MPC · JPL
294759	2008 CG_{24}	—	February 1, 2008	Kitt Peak	Spacewatch	NYS	1.1 km	MPC · JPL
294760	2008 CS_{24}	—	February 1, 2008	Kitt Peak	Spacewatch	·	840 m	MPC · JPL
294761	2008 CR_{25}	—	February 1, 2008	Kitt Peak	Spacewatch	·	920 m	MPC · JPL
294762	2008 CA_{26}	—	February 2, 2008	Kitt Peak	Spacewatch	KOR	1.7 km	MPC · JPL
294763	2008 CW_{27}	—	February 2, 2008	Kitt Peak	Spacewatch	·	1.5 km	MPC · JPL
294764	2008 CX_{29}	—	February 2, 2008	Kitt Peak	Spacewatch	·	3.0 km	MPC · JPL
294765	2008 CP_{31}	—	February 2, 2008	Kitt Peak	Spacewatch	·	780 m	MPC · JPL
294766	2008 CA_{32}	—	February 2, 2008	Kitt Peak	Spacewatch	·	2.0 km	MPC · JPL
294767	2008 CC_{32}	—	February 2, 2008	Kitt Peak	Spacewatch	THM	2.8 km	MPC · JPL
294768	2008 CK_{32}	—	February 2, 2008	Kitt Peak	Spacewatch	AST	2.7 km	MPC · JPL
294769	2008 CX_{32}	—	February 2, 2008	Kitt Peak	Spacewatch	NYS	1.4 km	MPC · JPL
294770	2008 CC_{33}	—	February 2, 2008	Kitt Peak	Spacewatch	AST	1.8 km	MPC · JPL
294771	2008 CT_{33}	—	February 2, 2008	Kitt Peak	Spacewatch	·	3.6 km	MPC · JPL
294772	2008 CF_{35}	—	February 2, 2008	Kitt Peak	Spacewatch	·	1.0 km	MPC · JPL
294773	2008 CV_{35}	—	February 2, 2008	Kitt Peak	Spacewatch	HOF	2.8 km	MPC · JPL
294774	2008 CJ_{36}	—	February 2, 2008	Kitt Peak	Spacewatch	ERI	1.7 km	MPC · JPL
294775	2008 CU_{40}	—	February 2, 2008	Kitt Peak	Spacewatch	·	910 m	MPC · JPL
294776	2008 CZ_{41}	—	February 2, 2008	Kitt Peak	Spacewatch	·	1.0 km	MPC · JPL
294777	2008 CA_{42}	—	February 2, 2008	Kitt Peak	Spacewatch	WIT	950 m	MPC · JPL
294778	2008 CL_{42}	—	February 2, 2008	Kitt Peak	Spacewatch	·	2.2 km	MPC · JPL
294779	2008 CW_{46}	—	February 2, 2008	Kitt Peak	Spacewatch	·	2.0 km	MPC · JPL
294780	2008 CQ_{48}	—	February 3, 2008	Kitt Peak	Spacewatch	·	670 m	MPC · JPL
294781	2008 CZ_{48}	—	February 6, 2008	Catalina	CSS	·	1.8 km	MPC · JPL
294782	2008 CH_{49}	—	February 6, 2008	Anderson Mesa	LONEOS	·	2.4 km	MPC · JPL
294783	2008 CJ_{49}	—	February 6, 2008	Catalina	CSS	V	770 m	MPC · JPL
294784	2008 CD_{50}	—	February 6, 2008	Catalina	CSS	HIL · 3:2	10 km	MPC · JPL
294785	2008 CF_{50}	—	February 6, 2008	Catalina	CSS	·	860 m	MPC · JPL
294786	2008 CT_{50}	—	February 6, 2008	Kanab	Sheridan, E.	·	1.6 km	MPC · JPL
294787	2008 CR_{51}	—	February 7, 2008	Kitt Peak	Spacewatch	·	1.0 km	MPC · JPL
294788	2008 CO_{61}	—	February 7, 2008	Kitt Peak	Spacewatch	·	3.9 km	MPC · JPL
294789	2008 CY_{61}	—	February 7, 2008	Mount Lemmon	Mount Lemmon Survey	·	820 m	MPC · JPL
294790	2008 CS_{63}	—	February 8, 2008	Mount Lemmon	Mount Lemmon Survey	·	2.3 km	MPC · JPL
294791	2008 CE_{64}	—	February 8, 2008	Mount Lemmon	Mount Lemmon Survey	·	1.5 km	MPC · JPL
294792	2008 CW_{66}	—	February 8, 2008	Catalina	CSS	·	2.6 km	MPC · JPL
294793	2008 CX_{70}	—	February 10, 2008	Desert Moon	Stevens, B. L.	EOS	2.3 km	MPC · JPL
294794	2008 CJ_{71}	—	February 3, 2008	Socorro	LINEAR	NYS ·	2.2 km	MPC · JPL
294795	2008 CW_{71}	—	February 9, 2008	Catalina	CSS	·	6.2 km	MPC · JPL
294796	2008 CB_{72}	—	February 9, 2008	Socorro	LINEAR	V	930 m	MPC · JPL
294797	2008 CC_{74}	—	February 9, 2008	Catalina	CSS	·	1.1 km	MPC · JPL
294798	2008 CD_{74}	—	February 9, 2008	Catalina	CSS	·	3.8 km	MPC · JPL
294799	2008 CR_{76}	—	February 6, 2008	Catalina	CSS	·	2.4 km	MPC · JPL
294800	2008 CS_{77}	—	February 6, 2008	Catalina	CSS	NYS	1.3 km	MPC · JPL

== 294801–294900 ==
back to top

Designation			Discovery			Properties		Ref
Permanent	Provisional	Named after	Date	Site	Discoverer(s)	Category	Diam.	Ref
294801	2008 CV_{80}	—	February 7, 2008	Kitt Peak	Spacewatch	KOR	1.6 km	MPC · JPL
294802	2008 CY_{82}	—	February 7, 2008	Kitt Peak	Spacewatch	·	2.2 km	MPC · JPL
294803	2008 CV_{86}	—	February 7, 2008	Mount Lemmon	Mount Lemmon Survey	·	2.1 km	MPC · JPL
294804	2008 CN_{88}	—	February 7, 2008	Mount Lemmon	Mount Lemmon Survey	AGN	1.5 km	MPC · JPL
294805	2008 CR_{88}	—	February 7, 2008	Mount Lemmon	Mount Lemmon Survey	·	3.4 km	MPC · JPL
294806	2008 CX_{88}	—	February 7, 2008	Mount Lemmon	Mount Lemmon Survey	·	5.0 km	MPC · JPL
294807	2008 CW_{89}	—	February 8, 2008	Kitt Peak	Spacewatch	AGN	1.6 km	MPC · JPL
294808	2008 CV_{93}	—	February 8, 2008	Mount Lemmon	Mount Lemmon Survey	·	3.2 km	MPC · JPL
294809	2008 CT_{94}	—	February 8, 2008	Mount Lemmon	Mount Lemmon Survey	·	1.2 km	MPC · JPL
294810	2008 CF_{95}	—	February 8, 2008	Mount Lemmon	Mount Lemmon Survey	·	1.2 km	MPC · JPL
294811	2008 CF_{103}	—	February 9, 2008	Kitt Peak	Spacewatch	·	1.8 km	MPC · JPL
294812	2008 CK_{108}	—	February 9, 2008	Catalina	CSS	·	1.5 km	MPC · JPL
294813	2008 CK_{109}	—	February 9, 2008	Kitt Peak	Spacewatch	·	3.8 km	MPC · JPL
294814 Nataliakidalova	2008 CJ_{117}	Nataliakidalova	February 11, 2008	Andrushivka	Andrushivka	·	1.6 km	MPC · JPL
294815	2008 CQ_{118}	—	November 19, 2003	Kitt Peak	Spacewatch	·	990 m	MPC · JPL
294816	2008 CT_{119}	—	February 14, 2008	Grove Creek	Tozzi, F.	·	3.0 km	MPC · JPL
294817	2008 CS_{120}	—	February 6, 2008	Catalina	CSS	EOS	2.5 km	MPC · JPL
294818	2008 CF_{121}	—	February 7, 2008	Kitt Peak	Spacewatch	·	1.3 km	MPC · JPL
294819	2008 CC_{123}	—	February 7, 2008	Mount Lemmon	Mount Lemmon Survey	·	1.5 km	MPC · JPL
294820	2008 CS_{125}	—	February 8, 2008	Mount Lemmon	Mount Lemmon Survey	HOF	3.2 km	MPC · JPL
294821	2008 CU_{126}	—	February 8, 2008	Kitt Peak	Spacewatch	·	1.5 km	MPC · JPL
294822	2008 CK_{127}	—	February 8, 2008	Kitt Peak	Spacewatch	NYS	1.2 km	MPC · JPL
294823	2008 CA_{136}	—	February 8, 2008	Kitt Peak	Spacewatch	·	700 m	MPC · JPL
294824	2008 CH_{137}	—	February 8, 2008	Mount Lemmon	Mount Lemmon Survey	·	930 m	MPC · JPL
294825	2008 CM_{137}	—	February 8, 2008	Kitt Peak	Spacewatch	·	1.2 km	MPC · JPL
294826	2008 CC_{140}	—	February 8, 2008	Mount Lemmon	Mount Lemmon Survey	·	690 m	MPC · JPL
294827	2008 CQ_{141}	—	February 8, 2008	Kitt Peak	Spacewatch	·	710 m	MPC · JPL
294828	2008 CC_{142}	—	February 8, 2008	Kitt Peak	Spacewatch	NYS	1.2 km	MPC · JPL
294829	2008 CM_{142}	—	February 8, 2008	Kitt Peak	Spacewatch	·	7.0 km	MPC · JPL
294830	2008 CV_{143}	—	February 8, 2008	Kitt Peak	Spacewatch	·	1.4 km	MPC · JPL
294831	2008 CW_{143}	—	February 8, 2008	Kitt Peak	Spacewatch	·	5.2 km	MPC · JPL
294832	2008 CB_{144}	—	February 8, 2008	Kitt Peak	Spacewatch	·	1.7 km	MPC · JPL
294833	2008 CW_{144}	—	February 9, 2008	Kitt Peak	Spacewatch	·	1.7 km	MPC · JPL
294834	2008 CC_{148}	—	February 9, 2008	Kitt Peak	Spacewatch	EOS	3.0 km	MPC · JPL
294835	2008 CE_{151}	—	February 9, 2008	Kitt Peak	Spacewatch	DOR	2.9 km	MPC · JPL
294836	2008 CM_{151}	—	February 9, 2008	Kitt Peak	Spacewatch	·	2.0 km	MPC · JPL
294837	2008 CV_{151}	—	February 9, 2008	Kitt Peak	Spacewatch	·	2.9 km	MPC · JPL
294838	2008 CG_{152}	—	February 9, 2008	Kitt Peak	Spacewatch	·	2.2 km	MPC · JPL
294839	2008 CK_{152}	—	February 9, 2008	Kitt Peak	Spacewatch	·	1.8 km	MPC · JPL
294840	2008 CH_{153}	—	February 9, 2008	Kitt Peak	Spacewatch	·	4.2 km	MPC · JPL
294841	2008 CP_{154}	—	February 9, 2008	Mount Lemmon	Mount Lemmon Survey	·	2.8 km	MPC · JPL
294842	2008 CD_{160}	—	February 9, 2008	Kitt Peak	Spacewatch	·	3.3 km	MPC · JPL
294843	2008 CZ_{162}	—	February 10, 2008	Kitt Peak	Spacewatch	·	2.3 km	MPC · JPL
294844	2008 CE_{163}	—	February 10, 2008	Kitt Peak	Spacewatch	·	2.7 km	MPC · JPL
294845	2008 CM_{165}	—	February 10, 2008	Kitt Peak	Spacewatch	HYG	3.8 km	MPC · JPL
294846	2008 CK_{167}	—	February 11, 2008	Mount Lemmon	Mount Lemmon Survey	·	1.1 km	MPC · JPL
294847	2008 CS_{167}	—	February 11, 2008	Mount Lemmon	Mount Lemmon Survey	·	1.4 km	MPC · JPL
294848	2008 CM_{170}	—	February 12, 2008	Mount Lemmon	Mount Lemmon Survey	·	2.4 km	MPC · JPL
294849	2008 CC_{174}	—	February 13, 2008	Catalina	CSS	·	960 m	MPC · JPL
294850	2008 CY_{176}	—	February 9, 2008	Socorro	LINEAR	V	860 m	MPC · JPL
294851	2008 CS_{178}	—	February 6, 2008	Anderson Mesa	LONEOS	NYS	1.3 km	MPC · JPL
294852	2008 CM_{182}	—	February 11, 2008	Mount Lemmon	Mount Lemmon Survey	·	1.3 km	MPC · JPL
294853	2008 CH_{183}	—	February 11, 2008	Mount Lemmon	Mount Lemmon Survey	V	890 m	MPC · JPL
294854	2008 CJ_{188}	—	February 6, 2008	Catalina	CSS	EUN	1.8 km	MPC · JPL
294855	2008 CD_{189}	—	February 13, 2008	Catalina	CSS	·	2.9 km	MPC · JPL
294856	2008 CB_{192}	—	February 2, 2008	Kitt Peak	Spacewatch	(2076)	810 m	MPC · JPL
294857	2008 CC_{193}	—	February 8, 2008	Kitt Peak	Spacewatch	·	760 m	MPC · JPL
294858	2008 CO_{193}	—	February 7, 2008	Mount Lemmon	Mount Lemmon Survey	EOS	2.1 km	MPC · JPL
294859	2008 CQ_{193}	—	February 7, 2008	Mount Lemmon	Mount Lemmon Survey	·	1.9 km	MPC · JPL
294860	2008 CP_{194}	—	February 11, 2008	Mount Lemmon	Mount Lemmon Survey	·	2.0 km	MPC · JPL
294861	2008 CL_{195}	—	February 1, 2008	Kitt Peak	Spacewatch	·	1.0 km	MPC · JPL
294862	2008 CH_{196}	—	February 13, 2008	Mount Lemmon	Mount Lemmon Survey	MAS	880 m	MPC · JPL
294863	2008 CL_{197}	—	February 8, 2008	Kitt Peak	Spacewatch	·	3.6 km	MPC · JPL
294864	2008 CU_{197}	—	February 10, 2008	Kitt Peak	Spacewatch	·	1.4 km	MPC · JPL
294865	2008 CT_{198}	—	February 12, 2008	Mount Lemmon	Mount Lemmon Survey	V	820 m	MPC · JPL
294866	2008 CY_{199}	—	February 13, 2008	Kitt Peak	Spacewatch	EOS	2.0 km	MPC · JPL
294867	2008 CE_{200}	—	February 10, 2008	Mount Lemmon	Mount Lemmon Survey	·	1.6 km	MPC · JPL
294868	2008 CQ_{200}	—	February 7, 2008	Kitt Peak	Spacewatch	·	3.2 km	MPC · JPL
294869	2008 CL_{201}	—	February 3, 2008	Catalina	CSS	·	2.5 km	MPC · JPL
294870	2008 CM_{201}	—	February 1, 2008	Kitt Peak	Spacewatch	HOF	2.7 km	MPC · JPL
294871	2008 CN_{201}	—	February 2, 2008	Kitt Peak	Spacewatch	·	1.7 km	MPC · JPL
294872	2008 CZ_{201}	—	February 13, 2008	Mount Lemmon	Mount Lemmon Survey	·	2.7 km	MPC · JPL
294873	2008 CA_{203}	—	February 9, 2008	Kitt Peak	Spacewatch	KOR	1.7 km	MPC · JPL
294874	2008 CH_{203}	—	February 10, 2008	Mount Lemmon	Mount Lemmon Survey	·	2.4 km	MPC · JPL
294875	2008 CK_{204}	—	February 13, 2008	Mount Lemmon	Mount Lemmon Survey	·	2.2 km	MPC · JPL
294876	2008 CQ_{205}	—	February 1, 2008	Kitt Peak	Spacewatch	·	570 m	MPC · JPL
294877	2008 CB_{209}	—	February 1, 2008	Socorro	LINEAR	·	5.5 km	MPC · JPL
294878	2008 CP_{211}	—	February 6, 2008	Catalina	CSS	·	1.3 km	MPC · JPL
294879	2008 CX_{212}	—	February 9, 2008	Socorro	LINEAR	·	4.0 km	MPC · JPL
294880	2008 CO_{213}	—	February 9, 2008	Kitt Peak	Spacewatch	·	1.4 km	MPC · JPL
294881	2008 CY_{213}	—	February 10, 2008	Mount Lemmon	Mount Lemmon Survey	·	2.2 km	MPC · JPL
294882	2008 CA_{215}	—	February 12, 2008	Kitt Peak	Spacewatch	KOR	1.6 km	MPC · JPL
294883	2008 DG_{2}	—	February 24, 2008	Kitt Peak	Spacewatch	·	1.0 km	MPC · JPL
294884	2008 DX_{2}	—	February 24, 2008	Kitt Peak	Spacewatch	·	970 m	MPC · JPL
294885	2008 DO_{3}	—	February 24, 2008	Kitt Peak	Spacewatch	615	1.5 km	MPC · JPL
294886	2008 DV_{7}	—	February 24, 2008	Mount Lemmon	Mount Lemmon Survey	·	1.9 km	MPC · JPL
294887	2008 DA_{8}	—	February 24, 2008	Mount Lemmon	Mount Lemmon Survey	·	1.0 km	MPC · JPL
294888	2008 DJ_{8}	—	February 24, 2008	Mount Lemmon	Mount Lemmon Survey	·	2.8 km	MPC · JPL
294889	2008 DN_{8}	—	February 24, 2008	Kitt Peak	Spacewatch	·	1 km	MPC · JPL
294890	2008 DO_{8}	—	February 24, 2008	Kitt Peak	Spacewatch	·	1.5 km	MPC · JPL
294891	2008 DP_{9}	—	February 25, 2008	Kitt Peak	Spacewatch	·	1.3 km	MPC · JPL
294892	2008 DC_{12}	—	February 26, 2008	Kitt Peak	Spacewatch	·	1.0 km	MPC · JPL
294893	2008 DG_{15}	—	February 26, 2008	Mount Lemmon	Mount Lemmon Survey	·	1.8 km	MPC · JPL
294894	2008 DK_{15}	—	February 26, 2008	Mount Lemmon	Mount Lemmon Survey	·	1.3 km	MPC · JPL
294895	2008 DB_{18}	—	February 26, 2008	Mount Lemmon	Mount Lemmon Survey	·	3.0 km	MPC · JPL
294896	2008 DN_{18}	—	February 26, 2008	Mount Lemmon	Mount Lemmon Survey	·	2.0 km	MPC · JPL
294897	2008 DK_{19}	—	February 27, 2008	Kitt Peak	Spacewatch	·	2.9 km	MPC · JPL
294898	2008 DT_{19}	—	February 27, 2008	Mount Lemmon	Mount Lemmon Survey	EUN	1.2 km	MPC · JPL
294899	2008 DW_{19}	—	February 27, 2008	Lulin	LUSS	·	1.5 km	MPC · JPL
294900	2008 DJ_{21}	—	February 28, 2008	Mount Lemmon	Mount Lemmon Survey	HOF	2.4 km	MPC · JPL

== 294901–295000 ==
back to top

Designation			Discovery			Properties		Ref
Permanent	Provisional	Named after	Date	Site	Discoverer(s)	Category	Diam.	Ref
294901	2008 DJ_{23}	—	February 29, 2008	La Sagra	OAM	TIR	3.6 km	MPC · JPL
294902	2008 DQ_{23}	—	February 24, 2008	Kitt Peak	Spacewatch	·	1.8 km	MPC · JPL
294903	2008 DK_{24}	—	February 28, 2008	Mount Lemmon	Mount Lemmon Survey	URS	4.7 km	MPC · JPL
294904	2008 DP_{26}	—	February 28, 2008	Kitt Peak	Spacewatch	·	5.3 km	MPC · JPL
294905	2008 DW_{26}	—	February 28, 2008	Kitt Peak	Spacewatch	·	1.5 km	MPC · JPL
294906	2008 DH_{27}	—	February 29, 2008	Mount Lemmon	Mount Lemmon Survey	·	4.4 km	MPC · JPL
294907	2008 DN_{27}	—	February 28, 2008	Socorro	LINEAR	·	1.5 km	MPC · JPL
294908	2008 DO_{27}	—	February 27, 2008	Mount Lemmon	Mount Lemmon Survey	·	2.0 km	MPC · JPL
294909	2008 DB_{28}	—	February 24, 2008	Kitt Peak	Spacewatch	·	3.5 km	MPC · JPL
294910	2008 DN_{28}	—	February 26, 2008	Kitt Peak	Spacewatch	·	720 m	MPC · JPL
294911	2008 DD_{29}	—	February 26, 2008	Kitt Peak	Spacewatch	VER	3.2 km	MPC · JPL
294912	2008 DF_{30}	—	February 26, 2008	Kitt Peak	Spacewatch	·	5.4 km	MPC · JPL
294913	2008 DB_{34}	—	February 27, 2008	Kitt Peak	Spacewatch	·	830 m	MPC · JPL
294914	2008 DF_{34}	—	February 27, 2008	Kitt Peak	Spacewatch	BAP	1.1 km	MPC · JPL
294915	2008 DB_{35}	—	February 27, 2008	Kitt Peak	Spacewatch	(5)	1.2 km	MPC · JPL
294916	2008 DD_{35}	—	February 27, 2008	Kitt Peak	Spacewatch	MAS	700 m	MPC · JPL
294917	2008 DK_{35}	—	August 24, 2005	Palomar	NEAT	WIT	1.3 km	MPC · JPL
294918	2008 DR_{35}	—	February 27, 2008	Kitt Peak	Spacewatch	·	1.4 km	MPC · JPL
294919	2008 DV_{35}	—	February 27, 2008	Mount Lemmon	Mount Lemmon Survey	·	1.5 km	MPC · JPL
294920	2008 DD_{37}	—	February 27, 2008	Kitt Peak	Spacewatch	GEF	1.6 km	MPC · JPL
294921	2008 DU_{37}	—	February 27, 2008	Mount Lemmon	Mount Lemmon Survey	·	3.6 km	MPC · JPL
294922	2008 DV_{37}	—	February 27, 2008	Mount Lemmon	Mount Lemmon Survey	·	1.2 km	MPC · JPL
294923	2008 DQ_{38}	—	February 27, 2008	Kitt Peak	Spacewatch	·	850 m	MPC · JPL
294924	2008 DA_{39}	—	February 27, 2008	Mount Lemmon	Mount Lemmon Survey	KOR	1.6 km	MPC · JPL
294925	2008 DC_{39}	—	February 27, 2008	Mount Lemmon	Mount Lemmon Survey	·	2.1 km	MPC · JPL
294926	2008 DU_{39}	—	February 27, 2008	Mount Lemmon	Mount Lemmon Survey	·	2.9 km	MPC · JPL
294927	2008 DC_{40}	—	February 27, 2008	Mount Lemmon	Mount Lemmon Survey	ERI	2.5 km	MPC · JPL
294928	2008 DQ_{40}	—	February 27, 2008	Kitt Peak	Spacewatch	·	1.4 km	MPC · JPL
294929	2008 DM_{45}	—	February 28, 2008	Kitt Peak	Spacewatch	·	3.3 km	MPC · JPL
294930	2008 DM_{47}	—	February 28, 2008	Kitt Peak	Spacewatch	·	4.3 km	MPC · JPL
294931	2008 DD_{48}	—	February 28, 2008	Mount Lemmon	Mount Lemmon Survey	THM	2.3 km	MPC · JPL
294932	2008 DE_{48}	—	February 28, 2008	Mount Lemmon	Mount Lemmon Survey	·	1.3 km	MPC · JPL
294933	2008 DB_{49}	—	February 29, 2008	Catalina	CSS	·	4.5 km	MPC · JPL
294934	2008 DM_{50}	—	February 29, 2008	Catalina	CSS	·	3.0 km	MPC · JPL
294935	2008 DW_{52}	—	February 29, 2008	Mount Lemmon	Mount Lemmon Survey	·	1.5 km	MPC · JPL
294936	2008 DA_{54}	—	February 29, 2008	Mount Lemmon	Mount Lemmon Survey	·	4.6 km	MPC · JPL
294937	2008 DO_{54}	—	February 27, 2008	Catalina	CSS	·	2.7 km	MPC · JPL
294938	2008 DY_{54}	—	February 29, 2008	Catalina	CSS	·	1.7 km	MPC · JPL
294939	2008 DM_{55}	—	February 26, 2008	Mount Lemmon	Mount Lemmon Survey	MAS	820 m	MPC · JPL
294940	2008 DZ_{56}	—	February 27, 2008	Catalina	CSS	·	1.6 km	MPC · JPL
294941	2008 DW_{57}	—	February 28, 2008	Catalina	CSS	·	4.4 km	MPC · JPL
294942	2008 DM_{59}	—	February 27, 2008	Mount Lemmon	Mount Lemmon Survey	·	1.4 km	MPC · JPL
294943	2008 DB_{62}	—	February 28, 2008	Kitt Peak	Spacewatch	EOS	1.8 km	MPC · JPL
294944	2008 DV_{64}	—	February 28, 2008	Mount Lemmon	Mount Lemmon Survey	EOS	2.3 km	MPC · JPL
294945	2008 DV_{66}	—	February 29, 2008	Kitt Peak	Spacewatch	·	1.4 km	MPC · JPL
294946	2008 DL_{68}	—	February 29, 2008	Kitt Peak	Spacewatch	·	760 m	MPC · JPL
294947	2008 DO_{68}	—	February 29, 2008	Kitt Peak	Spacewatch	·	1.6 km	MPC · JPL
294948	2008 DM_{69}	—	February 29, 2008	Kitt Peak	Spacewatch	·	1.1 km	MPC · JPL
294949	2008 DO_{69}	—	February 29, 2008	Kitt Peak	Spacewatch	·	2.0 km	MPC · JPL
294950	2008 DV_{69}	—	February 29, 2008	Kitt Peak	Spacewatch	·	4.0 km	MPC · JPL
294951	2008 DV_{70}	—	February 28, 2008	Catalina	CSS	EOS	2.8 km	MPC · JPL
294952	2008 DQ_{71}	—	February 24, 2008	Kitt Peak	Spacewatch	SYL · CYB	5.6 km	MPC · JPL
294953	2008 DU_{80}	—	February 24, 2008	Mount Lemmon	Mount Lemmon Survey	·	2.3 km	MPC · JPL
294954	2008 DU_{81}	—	February 28, 2008	Kitt Peak	Spacewatch	·	4.4 km	MPC · JPL
294955	2008 DR_{82}	—	February 28, 2008	Kitt Peak	Spacewatch	·	3.3 km	MPC · JPL
294956	2008 DB_{83}	—	February 28, 2008	Mount Lemmon	Mount Lemmon Survey	·	1.3 km	MPC · JPL
294957	2008 DT_{83}	—	February 28, 2008	Mount Lemmon	Mount Lemmon Survey	KOR	1.4 km	MPC · JPL
294958	2008 DO_{84}	—	February 28, 2008	Kitt Peak	Spacewatch	·	1.8 km	MPC · JPL
294959	2008 DG_{85}	—	February 29, 2008	Kitt Peak	Spacewatch	·	2.6 km	MPC · JPL
294960	2008 DT_{85}	—	February 28, 2008	Mount Lemmon	Mount Lemmon Survey	·	4.0 km	MPC · JPL
294961	2008 DZ_{85}	—	February 27, 2008	Kitt Peak	Spacewatch	NEM	2.5 km	MPC · JPL
294962	2008 DR_{86}	—	February 28, 2008	Mount Lemmon	Mount Lemmon Survey	·	4.3 km	MPC · JPL
294963	2008 DV_{86}	—	February 28, 2008	Kitt Peak	Spacewatch	·	2.9 km	MPC · JPL
294964	2008 DT_{87}	—	February 27, 2008	Mount Lemmon	Mount Lemmon Survey	·	970 m	MPC · JPL
294965	2008 DS_{88}	—	February 27, 2008	Mount Lemmon	Mount Lemmon Survey	·	2.3 km	MPC · JPL
294966	2008 EU	—	March 2, 2008	Grove Creek	Tozzi, F.	·	3.6 km	MPC · JPL
294967	2008 EJ_{3}	—	March 1, 2008	Mount Lemmon	Mount Lemmon Survey	HNS	1.3 km	MPC · JPL
294968	2008 EK_{3}	—	March 1, 2008	Mount Lemmon	Mount Lemmon Survey	·	1.4 km	MPC · JPL
294969	2008 EO_{5}	—	July 1, 2005	Kitt Peak	Spacewatch	·	2.3 km	MPC · JPL
294970	2008 EQ_{5}	—	March 2, 2008	Kitt Peak	Spacewatch	RAF	1.2 km	MPC · JPL
294971	2008 ER_{5}	—	March 2, 2008	Kitt Peak	Spacewatch	·	1.3 km	MPC · JPL
294972	2008 EK_{6}	—	March 3, 2008	Catalina	CSS	·	1.3 km	MPC · JPL
294973	2008 EU_{6}	—	March 3, 2008	Dauban	Kugel, F.	·	1.9 km	MPC · JPL
294974	2008 EX_{10}	—	March 1, 2008	Kitt Peak	Spacewatch	·	1.9 km	MPC · JPL
294975	2008 EB_{13}	—	March 1, 2008	Kitt Peak	Spacewatch	·	1.2 km	MPC · JPL
294976	2008 EJ_{14}	—	March 1, 2008	Kitt Peak	Spacewatch	·	2.1 km	MPC · JPL
294977	2008 EF_{15}	—	March 1, 2008	Kitt Peak	Spacewatch	·	6.3 km	MPC · JPL
294978	2008 EN_{15}	—	March 1, 2008	Kitt Peak	Spacewatch	·	1.3 km	MPC · JPL
294979	2008 EU_{15}	—	March 1, 2008	Kitt Peak	Spacewatch	NYS	920 m	MPC · JPL
294980	2008 EC_{16}	—	March 1, 2008	Kitt Peak	Spacewatch	NEM	2.4 km	MPC · JPL
294981	2008 ED_{16}	—	March 1, 2008	Kitt Peak	Spacewatch	·	1.8 km	MPC · JPL
294982	2008 EL_{16}	—	March 1, 2008	Kitt Peak	Spacewatch	·	870 m	MPC · JPL
294983	2008 ES_{16}	—	March 1, 2008	Kitt Peak	Spacewatch	·	1.7 km	MPC · JPL
294984	2008 EH_{17}	—	March 1, 2008	Kitt Peak	Spacewatch	·	3.4 km	MPC · JPL
294985	2008 EX_{19}	—	March 2, 2008	Kitt Peak	Spacewatch	·	980 m	MPC · JPL
294986	2008 EG_{20}	—	March 2, 2008	Kitt Peak	Spacewatch	EOS	2.4 km	MPC · JPL
294987	2008 EK_{20}	—	March 2, 2008	Kitt Peak	Spacewatch	NYS	990 m	MPC · JPL
294988	2008 ES_{20}	—	March 2, 2008	Kitt Peak	Spacewatch	·	2.1 km	MPC · JPL
294989	2008 EB_{21}	—	March 2, 2008	Kitt Peak	Spacewatch	·	2.3 km	MPC · JPL
294990	2008 EJ_{21}	—	March 2, 2008	Mount Lemmon	Mount Lemmon Survey	·	2.9 km	MPC · JPL
294991	2008 EN_{22}	—	March 3, 2008	Catalina	CSS	·	1.6 km	MPC · JPL
294992	2008 EB_{23}	—	March 3, 2008	Catalina	CSS	·	3.1 km	MPC · JPL
294993	2008 EW_{26}	—	March 4, 2008	Catalina	CSS	·	3.2 km	MPC · JPL
294994	2008 EZ_{27}	—	March 4, 2008	Mount Lemmon	Mount Lemmon Survey	·	5.6 km	MPC · JPL
294995	2008 EN_{32}	—	March 1, 2008	Kitt Peak	Spacewatch	·	1.6 km	MPC · JPL
294996	2008 ES_{32}	—	March 1, 2008	Kitt Peak	Spacewatch	·	920 m	MPC · JPL
294997	2008 EA_{33}	—	March 1, 2008	Kitt Peak	Spacewatch	·	1.2 km	MPC · JPL
294998	2008 EN_{35}	—	March 2, 2008	Mount Lemmon	Mount Lemmon Survey	·	2.6 km	MPC · JPL
294999	2008 EW_{35}	—	March 3, 2008	Kitt Peak	Spacewatch	·	1.9 km	MPC · JPL
295000	2008 EQ_{36}	—	March 3, 2008	Kitt Peak	Spacewatch	NYS	1.5 km	MPC · JPL

back to top

== See also ==
- Meanings of minor-planet names: 294001–295000
