= Mykhailo Petrenko =

Ukrainian romantic poet (1817–1863)

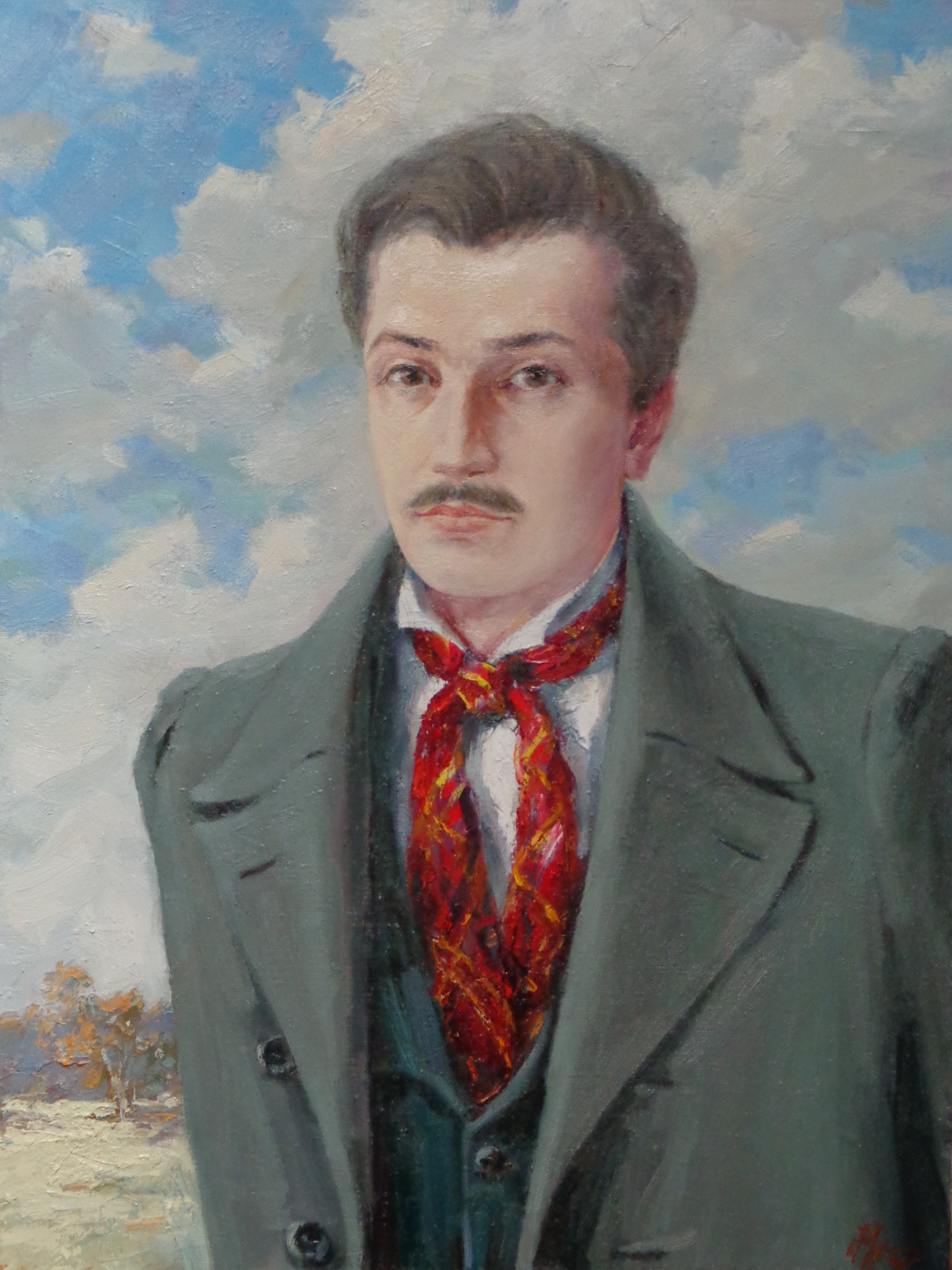
- Petrenko's contemporary portrait
- Born: Mykhailo Mykolayovych Petrenko; 1817; Sloviansk, Russian Empire (now Donetsk Oblast, Ukraine)
- Died: January 6, 1863 [O.S. December 25, 1862] Lebedyn, Russian Empire
- Citizenship: Russian Empire
- Education: Kharkov University
- Occupation: Poet
- Spouse: Anna Evgrafivna Myrgorodova
- Writing career
- Period: 1841–1862

Mykhailo Mykolayovych Petrenko (Ukrainian: Петренко Михайло Миколайович; 1817 – January 6, 1863 [O.S. December 25, 1862]) was a Ukrainian romantic poet notable for his musical works, and a member of the Kharkiv Romantic School. He was married to Anna Evgrafivna Myrgorodova.

== Biography ==
Petrenko was born in the town Sloviansk to a provincial secretary, Petrenko Mykola Dmytrovych, and his wife Mykola Dmytrovych in 1817 as their second child. Petrenko studied at the juridical faculty of Kharkov University during 1837–1841. He served in the judicial institutions: in Kharkov (1844–1847), Vovchansk (1847–1849), Lebedyn (1849–1862), rising to collegiate assessor (rank 8th grade).

Petrenko's first poetry published in the anthology Snip (1841). Among them was the poem "I looked at the sky and thought a thought", which became a folk song – the highest award for Ukrainian poet. His 1845 dramatic duma "Naida" was first published in 2013. In 1848 A. L. Metlynsky published in the "South Russian collection" selection of Petrenko's poems titled "Thoughts and singing".

Asteroid 274843 Mykhailopetrenko, discovered by astronomers at the Andrushivka Astronomical Observatory in 2009, was named in his honor. The official naming citation was published by the Minor Planet Center on 8 October 2014 (M.P.C. 90380).
