= Watching the sky and thinking a thought =

Ukrainian song

"I am Watching the sky and thinking a thought"

Song by Anatoliy Solovianenko, Ivan Kozlovsky, Borys Hmyria, Muslim Magomayev and other
- Recorded: 1903
- Songwriter: Mykhailo Petrenko

"I am watching the sky and thinking a thought" (Ukrainian: «Дивлюсь я на небо та й думку гадаю», romanized: Dyvlius ya na nebo ta j dumku hadaiu) is a song with lyrics written by Ukrainian romantic poet Mykhailo Petrenko in 1841. It was set to music by Lyudmila Alexandrova. Vladislav Zaremba arranged this song for voice and piano. This song became one of the first two songs sung in space: this happened on August 12, 1962, on board the spacecraft "Vostok 3 and 4" when the first Ukrainian Soviet cosmonaut Pavlo Popovych from Ukraine, who had previously been fond of opera singing, performed it at the special request of Serhiy Korolyov, a prominent Soviet rocket engineer and designer of spacecraft from Ukraine, which sent the first satellite and the first people into space.

55 years after the first performance of Ukrainian song in space, on August 12, 2017, the introduction of this day as Ukrainian Song Day was initiated.

Original text by Petrenko (modern writing)

Дивлюся на небо та й думку гадаю:
Чому я не сокіл, чому не літаю,
Чому мені, Боже, ти криллів не дав?
Я землю б покинув і в небо злітав!

Далеко за хмари, подальше од світу,
Шукать собі долі, на горе привіту
І ласки у зірок, у сонця просить,
У світі їх яснім все горе втопить;

Бо долі ще змалу здаюся не любий,
Я наймит у неї, хлопцюга приблудний;
Чужий я у долі, чужий у людей:
Хіба ж хто кохає нерідних дітей?

Кохаюся лихом, привіту не знаю,
І гірко, і марно свій вік коротаю;
І в горі спізнав я, що тільки одна –
Далекеє небо – моя сторона.

І нá світі гірко; як стане ще гірше,
Я очі на небо, – мені веселіше!
І в думках забуду, що я сирота,
І думка далеко, високо літа.

Коли б мені крилля, орлячі ті крилля,
Я землю б покинув, і на новосілля
Орлом бистрокрилим у небо польнув,
І в хмарах навіки од світа втонув!

Translation by Liuba Gavur

Watching the sky and thinking a thought:
Why am I not a falcon? Why am I not flying?
Why, Lord, have you not granted me wings?
I would the earth forsake and fly to the heavens.

Far beyond the clouds, further from earth away,
To seek my fate, welcoming grief,
And from the stars seeking mercy, from the sun begging care
To bathe in their light, to drown sorrows therein.

For since childhood fate seems unkind,
An orphan I am, a misguided waif straying;
Ill-fated I am, a stranger midst people;
Does anyone after all love alien children?

I embrace cold misfortune, know not any welcome
And bitterly, uselessly while away my years
And in grief I’ve discovered that there is only one –
I embrace cold misfortune, know not any welcome
The far-away heavens – my hearth and my home.

On earth it is bitter, and when it becomes worse –
My eyes reach toward heaven and all becomes better!
In my thoughts I forget that an orphan I am.
And thoughts hover and flutter and fly high beyond.

If only I had wings, like an eagle’s those wings,
I’d abandon the earth and for new horizons
Toward home as an eagle, an eagle swift-winged,
I’d dive in the heavens
And in clouds forever from earth I would drown!

== Prominent singers ==
Performance by Markiyan Sviato at the National Composers' Union of Ukraine

- Borys Hmyria video)
- Ivan Zhadan video)
- Ivan Kozlovsky (video)
- Anatoly Solovyanenko video)
- Yaroslav Yevdokimov video)
- Yuri Gulyaev (video)
- Muslim Magomayev (video)
- Oleksandr Ponomariov (video)
- Mark Reisen (video)
- Igor Borko (video)
- Soviet Army Song and Dance Ensemble video)
- Riga Etude Song Theater (video)

== Literature ==
- Михайло Петренко: Життя і творчість (художні тексти, дослідження, документи). // Упорядники О. Є. Петренко, О. О. Редчук. Оформлення Д. О. Редчук. «Фенікс». — К., 2013, 218 с.
- Поет-романтик Михайло Миколайович Петренко (1817—1862): Твори. Критичні та історико-літературні матеріали. // Упорядник О. Є. Петренко. "ПП "НВЦ «ПРОФІ». — К., 2015, 586 с.
- Михайло Петренко. Твори / Упорядник О. Є. Петренко. – К.: «Кий», 2017. – 104 с.
- Михайло Миколайович Петренко. 200 років безсмертя / Петренко О. Є., Шабанова В. М. – К.: «Кий», 2017. – 238 с.
- «Дивлюся на небо та й думку гадаю» в перекладах мовами світу / Упорядники Є. В. Букет, О. Є. Петренко. – Житомир: ФОП Євенок О. О., 2017. – 112 с. – (Бібліотека газети «Культура і життя»).
