= Meanings of minor-planet names: 274001–275000 =

As minor planet discoveries are confirmed, they are given a permanent number by the IAU's Minor Planet Center (MPC), and the discoverers can then submit names for them, following the IAU's naming conventions. The list below concerns those minor planets in the specified number-range that have received names, and explains the meanings of those names.

Official naming citations of newly named small Solar System bodies are approved and published in a bulletin by IAU's Working Group for Small Bodies Nomenclature (WGSBN). Before May 2021, citations were published in MPC's Minor Planet Circulars for many decades. Recent citations can also be found on the JPL Small-Body Database (SBDB). Until his death in 2016, German astronomer Lutz D. Schmadel compiled these citations into the Dictionary of Minor Planet Names (DMP) and regularly updated the collection.

Based on Paul Herget's The Names of the Minor Planets, Schmadel also researched the unclear origin of numerous asteroids, most of which had been named prior to World War II. This article incorporates text from this source, which is in the public domain: SBDB New namings may only be added to this list below after official publication as the preannouncement of names is condemned. The WGSBN publishes a comprehensive guideline for the naming rules of non-cometary small Solar System bodies.

== 274001–274100 ==
Named minor planet	Provisional	This minor planet was named for...	Ref · Catalog
274020 Skywalker	2007 RW_{15}	Skywalker is the family name of the fictional characters Luke and Anakin in the Star Wars universe.	JPL · 274020
274021 Monikapoeller	2007 RB_{18}	Monika Puttinger, the discoverer's teacher.	IAU · · 274021
274084 Baldone	2008 AU_{101}	Baldone, a city in the southwest of Riga.	JPL · 274084

== 274101–274200 ==
back to top

Named minor planet	Provisional	This minor planet was named for...	Ref · Catalog
274137 Angelaglinos	2008 FC_{6}	Angela Glinos (born 1962), a Canadian computer scientist, who has successfully balanced a career at Bell Labs and the University of Toronto while raising three daughters and supporting her husband's astronomical interests.	JPL · 274137

== 274201–274300 ==
back to top

Named minor planet	Provisional	This minor planet was named for...	Ref · Catalog
274213 Satriani	2008 JA_{6}	Joe Satriani (born 1956), an American rock guitarist and top guitar virtuoso, who was recruited by Mick Jagger and then toured with Deep Purple as the lead guitarist	JPL · 274213
274246 Reggiacaserta	2008 OY_{9}	The Royal Palace of Caserta ("Reggia Caserta") is a former royal residence in southern Italy, constructed for the Bourbon kings of Naples. It is one of the largest palaces erected in Europe during the 18th century. The palace was designated a World Heritage Site by UNESCO in 1997.	JPL · 274246
274264 Piccolomini	2008 PZ_{6}	Alessandro Piccolomini (1508–1578/79), an Italian astronomer and archbishop, who created the first modern celestial atlas, De le stelle fisse (The sphere of the world and The fixed stars) in 1540. The lunar crater Piccolomini is also named after him.	IAU · 274264
274290 Lechnerödön	2008 QX_{13}	Ödön Lechner, Hungarian architect.	IAU · 274290
274300 UNESCO	2008 QG_{24}	UNESCO, the United Nations Educational, Scientific and Cultural Organization, a specialized agency of the United Nations	JPL · 274300

== 274301–274400 ==
back to top

Named minor planet	Provisional	This minor planet was named for...	Ref · Catalog
274301 Wikipedia	2008 QH_{24}	Wikipedia, a free, copyleft, collaboratively edited online encyclopedia that was launched in 2001	JPL · 274301
274302 Abaházi	2008 QD_{25}	Richard Abaházi (1907–1977), a Hungarian engineer who worked at Konkoly Observatory between 1935 and 1940. He made regular observations of occultations, and photographed comets and asteroids.	JPL · 274302
274333 Voznyukigor	2008 RT_{21}	Igor Mykolayovych Voznyuk (born 1964), a graduate of the Faculty of Physical Department of the Kyiv University, is an optician by profession.	JPL · 274333
274334 Kyivplaniy	2008 RP_{22}	Kyiv Planetarium in Kyiv, Ukraine, one of the country's leading cultural and educational centers to promote astronomy. It was founded by Sergey Vsekhsvyatsky in 1952.	JPL · 274334

== 274401–274500 ==
back to top

Named minor planet	Provisional	This minor planet was named for...	Ref · Catalog
274472 Pietà	2008 SV_{83}	The Vatican Pietà is a white Carrara marble sculpture by Michelangelo Buonarroti, kept in the Basilica of St. Peter in Vatican City. This was the first masterpiece by the young Michelangelo, and it considered one of the greatest works of art.	JPL · 274472

== 274501–274600 ==
back to top

Named minor planet	Provisional	This minor planet was named for...	Ref · Catalog
There are no named minor planets in this number range

== 274601–274700 ==
back to top

Named minor planet	Provisional	This minor planet was named for...	Ref · Catalog
There are no named minor planets in this number range

== 274701–274800 ==
back to top

Named minor planet	Provisional	This minor planet was named for...	Ref · Catalog
There are no named minor planets in this number range

== 274801–274900 ==
back to top

Named minor planet	Provisional	This minor planet was named for...	Ref · Catalog
274810 Fedáksári	2008 YP_{25}	Sári Fedák (1879–1955), a Hungarian actress and singer, one of the most well known prima donnas of her time.	JPL · 274810
274835 Aachen	2009 QC_{11}	The German city of Aachen. It developed from a Roman settlement and spa, was the preferred medieval Imperial residence of Charlemagne, and, from 936 to 1531, the Aachen Cathedral was the coronation church for thirty German kings.	JPL · 274835
274843 Mykhailopetrenko	2009 QF_{30}	Mykhailo Petrenko (1817–1862), a Ukrainian romantic poet. Some of his poems were set to music and became very popular folk songs.	JPL · 274843
274856 Rosendosalvado	2009 RQ_{5}	Rosendo Salvado (1814–1900), a Spanish monk, missionary and bishop, who, in 1847, founded the Benedictine community in New Norcia, Australia. The town now hosts the New Norcia Station, ESA's deep space ground station with a 35-meter dish, built specifically to communicate with the Rosetta space probe.	MPC · 274856
274860 Emilylakdawalla	2009 RE_{26}	Emily Lakdawalla (born 1975), an American planetary geologist and awarded science communicator	JPL · 274860

== 274901–275000 ==
back to top

Named minor planet	Provisional	This minor planet was named for...	Ref · Catalog
274928 von Weinberg	2009 SU_{170}	Arthur von Weinberg (1860–1943), a German chemist and manager of the largest textile azo dyestuff production of its time, honorary citizen of Frankfurt, honorary member of the Physikalischer Verein, director of Senckenberg and arts patron.	IAU · 274928
274981 Petrsu	2009 TV_{2}	Petrozavodsk State University in the Republic of Karelia, Russia	JPL · 274981

back to top

Preceded by 273,001–274,000	Meanings of minor-planet names List of minor planets: 274,001–275,000	Succeeded by 275,001–276,000
