= List of minor planets: 274001–275000 =

The following is a partial list of minor planets, running from minor-planet number 274001 through 275000, inclusive. The primary data for this and other partial lists is based on JPL's "Small-Body Orbital Elements" and data available from the Minor Planet Center. Critical list information is also provided by the MPC, unless otherwise specified from Lowell Observatory. A detailed description of the table's columns and additional sources are given on the main page including a complete list of every page in this series, and a statistical break-up on the dynamical classification of minor planets.

Also see the summary list of all named bodies in numerical and alphabetical order, and the corresponding naming citations for the number range of this particular list. New namings may only be added to this list after official publication, as the preannouncement of names is condemned by the Working Group for Small Bodies Nomenclature of the International Astronomical Union.

Near-Earth obj.	MBA (inner)	MBA (outer)	Centaur
Mars-crosser	MBA (middle)	Jupiter trojan	Trans-Neptunian obj.
Unclassified

== 274001–274100 ==
Designation			Discovery			Properties		Ref
Permanent	Provisional	Named after	Date	Site	Discoverer(s)	Category	Diam.	Ref
274001	2007 PG_{1}	—	August 4, 2007	Great Shefford	Birtwhistle, P.	·	3.7 km	MPC · JPL
274002	2007 PW_{12}	—	August 8, 2007	Socorro	LINEAR	·	3.1 km	MPC · JPL
274003	2007 PF_{17}	—	August 9, 2007	Dauban	Chante-Perdrix	EOS	2.7 km	MPC · JPL
274004	2007 PS_{21}	—	August 9, 2007	Socorro	LINEAR	·	2.7 km	MPC · JPL
274005	2007 PX_{23}	—	August 12, 2007	Socorro	LINEAR	·	4.3 km	MPC · JPL
274006	2007 PJ_{38}	—	August 14, 2007	Socorro	LINEAR	·	5.6 km	MPC · JPL
274007	2007 PN_{39}	—	August 15, 2007	Altschwendt	W. Ries	·	2.7 km	MPC · JPL
274008	2007 PC_{41}	—	August 13, 2007	Socorro	LINEAR	·	3.2 km	MPC · JPL
274009	2007 PH_{45}	—	August 10, 2007	Kitt Peak	Spacewatch	THM	2.2 km	MPC · JPL
274010	2007 PG_{46}	—	August 10, 2007	Kitt Peak	Spacewatch	EOS	2.2 km	MPC · JPL
274011	2007 PA_{50}	—	August 10, 2007	Kitt Peak	Spacewatch	·	3.0 km	MPC · JPL
274012	2007 QY_{5}	—	August 21, 2007	Anderson Mesa	LONEOS	VER	5.7 km	MPC · JPL
274013	2007 QB_{10}	—	August 22, 2007	Socorro	LINEAR	T_{j} (2.97) · HIL · 3:2 · (6124)	7.4 km	MPC · JPL
274014	2007 QS_{10}	—	August 23, 2007	Kitt Peak	Spacewatch	·	3.1 km	MPC · JPL
274015	2007 QS_{15}	—	August 21, 2007	Anderson Mesa	LONEOS	HYG	3.2 km	MPC · JPL
274016	2007 RL_{4}	—	September 3, 2007	Catalina	CSS	HYG	3.4 km	MPC · JPL
274017	2007 RU_{4}	—	September 3, 2007	Catalina	CSS	LIX	4.1 km	MPC · JPL
274018	2007 RB_{6}	—	September 5, 2007	Dauban	Chante-Perdrix	EOS	2.8 km	MPC · JPL
274019	2007 RL_{15}	—	September 12, 2007	Hibiscus	S. F. Hönig, Teamo, N.	·	4.3 km	MPC · JPL
274020 Skywalker	2007 RW_{15}	Skywalker	September 12, 2007	Taunus	Karge, S., E. Schwab	·	4.0 km	MPC · JPL
274021 Monikapoeller	2007 RB_{18}	Monikapoeller	September 12, 2007	Gaisberg	Gierlinger, R.	VER	3.4 km	MPC · JPL
274022	2007 RZ_{18}	—	September 13, 2007	Dauban	Chante-Perdrix	·	1.9 km	MPC · JPL
274023	2007 RE_{21}	—	September 3, 2007	Catalina	CSS	·	3.0 km	MPC · JPL
274024	2007 RK_{21}	—	September 3, 2007	Catalina	CSS	·	3.3 km	MPC · JPL
274025	2007 RM_{22}	—	September 3, 2007	Catalina	CSS	·	5.0 km	MPC · JPL
274026	2007 RT_{29}	—	September 4, 2007	Catalina	CSS	slow	7.0 km	MPC · JPL
274027	2007 RE_{50}	—	September 9, 2007	Kitt Peak	Spacewatch	·	4.5 km	MPC · JPL
274028	2007 RF_{77}	—	September 10, 2007	Mount Lemmon	Mount Lemmon Survey	LIX	4.4 km	MPC · JPL
274029	2007 RS_{91}	—	September 10, 2007	Mount Lemmon	Mount Lemmon Survey	·	1.8 km	MPC · JPL
274030	2007 RH_{95}	—	September 10, 2007	Kitt Peak	Spacewatch	·	3.9 km	MPC · JPL
274031	2007 RE_{113}	—	September 11, 2007	Kitt Peak	Spacewatch	·	2.4 km	MPC · JPL
274032	2007 RL_{124}	—	September 12, 2007	Mount Lemmon	Mount Lemmon Survey	3:2 · SHU	5.4 km	MPC · JPL
274033	2007 RG_{134}	—	September 12, 2007	Catalina	CSS	HYG	5.0 km	MPC · JPL
274034	2007 RH_{137}	—	September 14, 2007	Mount Lemmon	Mount Lemmon Survey	·	4.3 km	MPC · JPL
274035	2007 RR_{144}	—	September 14, 2007	Socorro	LINEAR	·	5.6 km	MPC · JPL
274036	2007 RM_{164}	—	September 10, 2007	Kitt Peak	Spacewatch	·	4.0 km	MPC · JPL
274037	2007 RG_{188}	—	September 9, 2007	Anderson Mesa	LONEOS	·	2.5 km	MPC · JPL
274038	2007 RY_{208}	—	September 10, 2007	Kitt Peak	Spacewatch	·	4.9 km	MPC · JPL
274039	2007 RL_{211}	—	September 11, 2007	Mount Lemmon	Mount Lemmon Survey	·	2.0 km	MPC · JPL
274040	2007 RZ_{215}	—	September 12, 2007	Kitt Peak	Spacewatch	·	4.8 km	MPC · JPL
274041	2007 RL_{246}	—	September 12, 2007	Kitt Peak	Spacewatch	·	3.3 km	MPC · JPL
274042	2007 RJ_{275}	—	September 6, 2007	Siding Spring	SSS	·	4.7 km	MPC · JPL
274043	2007 RU_{279}	—	September 8, 2007	Siding Spring	SSS	·	3.9 km	MPC · JPL
274044	2007 RY_{279}	—	September 9, 2007	Anderson Mesa	LONEOS	·	4.8 km	MPC · JPL
274045	2007 RQ_{295}	—	September 14, 2007	Mount Lemmon	Mount Lemmon Survey	·	3.7 km	MPC · JPL
274046	2007 RP_{310}	—	September 6, 2007	Siding Spring	SSS	·	3.1 km	MPC · JPL
274047	2007 RX_{311}	—	September 5, 2007	Anderson Mesa	LONEOS	·	4.5 km	MPC · JPL
274048	2007 RC_{312}	—	September 11, 2007	Catalina	CSS	LIX	6.5 km	MPC · JPL
274049	2007 RK_{315}	—	September 9, 2007	Mount Lemmon	Mount Lemmon Survey	CYB	6.8 km	MPC · JPL
274050	2007 RT_{319}	—	September 13, 2007	Socorro	LINEAR	·	4.0 km	MPC · JPL
274051	2007 RC_{321}	—	September 13, 2007	Socorro	LINEAR	·	3.4 km	MPC · JPL
274052	2007 SC_{1}	—	September 19, 2007	Mayhill	Lowe, A.	·	3.4 km	MPC · JPL
274053	2007 SM_{20}	—	September 25, 2007	Mount Lemmon	Mount Lemmon Survey	·	990 m	MPC · JPL
274054	2007 TA_{9}	—	October 6, 2007	Bergisch Gladbach	W. Bickel	·	3.3 km	MPC · JPL
274055	2007 TW_{18}	—	October 9, 2007	Catalina	CSS	H	730 m	MPC · JPL
274056	2007 TP_{24}	—	October 11, 2007	Eskridge	G. Hug	3:2	6.3 km	MPC · JPL
274057	2007 TW_{58}	—	October 5, 2007	Kitt Peak	Spacewatch	LIX	4.9 km	MPC · JPL
274058	2007 TD_{69}	—	October 13, 2007	Altschwendt	W. Ries	·	3.6 km	MPC · JPL
274059	2007 TB_{95}	—	October 7, 2007	Catalina	CSS	CYB	5.4 km	MPC · JPL
274060	2007 TF_{111}	—	October 8, 2007	Catalina	CSS	T_{j} (2.96) · 3:2	7.2 km	MPC · JPL
274061	2007 TC_{135}	—	October 8, 2007	Kitt Peak	Spacewatch	·	3.6 km	MPC · JPL
274062	2007 TH_{147}	—	October 7, 2007	Socorro	LINEAR	EUP	5.2 km	MPC · JPL
274063	2007 TZ_{149}	—	October 9, 2007	Socorro	LINEAR	·	3.6 km	MPC · JPL
274064	2007 TM_{274}	—	October 11, 2007	Kitt Peak	Spacewatch	VER	4.5 km	MPC · JPL
274065	2007 TR_{283}	—	October 8, 2007	Mount Lemmon	Mount Lemmon Survey	THM	3.0 km	MPC · JPL
274066	2007 TB_{287}	—	October 11, 2007	Mount Lemmon	Mount Lemmon Survey	·	1.7 km	MPC · JPL
274067	2007 TZ_{421}	—	October 15, 2007	Catalina	CSS	H	700 m	MPC · JPL
274068	2007 TN_{428}	—	October 11, 2007	Catalina	CSS	·	4.9 km	MPC · JPL
274069	2007 VU_{188}	—	November 12, 2007	Socorro	LINEAR	·	900 m	MPC · JPL
274070	2007 VL_{193}	—	November 4, 2007	Mount Lemmon	Mount Lemmon Survey	H	740 m	MPC · JPL
274071	2007 XE_{4}	—	December 3, 2007	Catalina	CSS	·	820 m	MPC · JPL
274072	2007 XM_{17}	—	December 8, 2007	Bisei SG Center	BATTeRS	·	1.3 km	MPC · JPL
274073	2007 XH_{32}	—	December 15, 2007	Catalina	CSS	·	2.0 km	MPC · JPL
274074	2007 XO_{33}	—	December 10, 2007	Socorro	LINEAR	·	1.1 km	MPC · JPL
274075	2007 XV_{38}	—	December 13, 2007	Socorro	LINEAR	·	2.3 km	MPC · JPL
274076	2007 YW_{21}	—	December 16, 2007	Kitt Peak	Spacewatch	·	880 m	MPC · JPL
274077	2007 YK_{34}	—	December 28, 2007	Kitt Peak	Spacewatch	·	3.5 km	MPC · JPL
274078	2007 YT_{43}	—	December 30, 2007	Kitt Peak	Spacewatch	·	1.4 km	MPC · JPL
274079	2008 AE_{25}	—	January 10, 2008	Mount Lemmon	Mount Lemmon Survey	·	1.7 km	MPC · JPL
274080	2008 AJ_{25}	—	January 10, 2008	Mount Lemmon	Mount Lemmon Survey	MAS	700 m	MPC · JPL
274081	2008 AB_{33}	—	January 11, 2008	Kitt Peak	Spacewatch	V	910 m	MPC · JPL
274082	2008 AM_{60}	—	January 11, 2008	Kitt Peak	Spacewatch	·	630 m	MPC · JPL
274083	2008 AK_{85}	—	January 13, 2008	Kitt Peak	Spacewatch	·	1.5 km	MPC · JPL
274084 Baldone	2008 AU_{101}	Baldone	January 3, 2008	Baldone	K. Černis, I. Eglītis	ERI	1.8 km	MPC · JPL
274085	2008 AF_{112}	—	January 12, 2008	Catalina	CSS	H	700 m	MPC · JPL
274086	2008 BN_{23}	—	January 31, 2008	Mount Lemmon	Mount Lemmon Survey	MAS	730 m	MPC · JPL
274087	2008 BF_{40}	—	January 31, 2008	Catalina	CSS	H	770 m	MPC · JPL
274088	2008 BT_{49}	—	January 19, 2008	Mount Lemmon	Mount Lemmon Survey	·	910 m	MPC · JPL
274089	2008 CA_{16}	—	February 3, 2008	Kitt Peak	Spacewatch	·	1.0 km	MPC · JPL
274090	2008 CJ_{52}	—	February 7, 2008	Kitt Peak	Spacewatch	·	1.3 km	MPC · JPL
274091	2008 CE_{63}	—	February 8, 2008	Kitt Peak	Spacewatch	H	850 m	MPC · JPL
274092	2008 CZ_{71}	—	February 9, 2008	Socorro	LINEAR	H	780 m	MPC · JPL
274093	2008 CO_{73}	—	February 6, 2008	Catalina	CSS	ERI	2.0 km	MPC · JPL
274094	2008 CS_{91}	—	February 8, 2008	Kitt Peak	Spacewatch	·	900 m	MPC · JPL
274095	2008 CQ_{94}	—	February 8, 2008	Mount Lemmon	Mount Lemmon Survey	·	1.4 km	MPC · JPL
274096	2008 CZ_{115}	—	February 10, 2008	Mount Lemmon	Mount Lemmon Survey	·	880 m	MPC · JPL
274097	2008 CS_{135}	—	February 8, 2008	Kitt Peak	Spacewatch	NYS	1.4 km	MPC · JPL
274098	2008 CA_{149}	—	February 9, 2008	Mount Lemmon	Mount Lemmon Survey	NYS	1.4 km	MPC · JPL
274099	2008 CF_{172}	—	February 12, 2008	Siding Spring	SSS	H	820 m	MPC · JPL
274100	2008 CX_{174}	—	February 13, 2008	Anderson Mesa	LONEOS	·	1.5 km	MPC · JPL

== 274101–274200 ==
back to top

Designation			Discovery			Properties		Ref
Permanent	Provisional	Named after	Date	Site	Discoverer(s)	Category	Diam.	Ref
274101	2008 CG_{181}	—	February 10, 2008	Catalina	CSS	PHO	3.5 km	MPC · JPL
274102	2008 CF_{195}	—	February 9, 2008	Mount Lemmon	Mount Lemmon Survey	·	1.0 km	MPC · JPL
274103	2008 CJ_{195}	—	February 10, 2008	Mount Lemmon	Mount Lemmon Survey	·	760 m	MPC · JPL
274104	2008 CK_{199}	—	February 13, 2008	Mount Lemmon	Mount Lemmon Survey	MAS	880 m	MPC · JPL
274105	2008 DC_{4}	—	February 26, 2008	Wildberg	R. Apitzsch	V	630 m	MPC · JPL
274106	2008 DO_{19}	—	February 27, 2008	Mount Lemmon	Mount Lemmon Survey	·	770 m	MPC · JPL
274107	2008 DL_{21}	—	February 28, 2008	Mount Lemmon	Mount Lemmon Survey	·	980 m	MPC · JPL
274108	2008 DP_{22}	—	February 29, 2008	Catalina	CSS	H	680 m	MPC · JPL
274109	2008 DB_{23}	—	February 26, 2008	Socorro	LINEAR	H	850 m	MPC · JPL
274110	2008 DH_{26}	—	February 26, 2008	Kitt Peak	Spacewatch	·	810 m	MPC · JPL
274111	2008 DV_{29}	—	February 26, 2008	Mount Lemmon	Mount Lemmon Survey	AEO	1.5 km	MPC · JPL
274112	2008 DW_{38}	—	February 27, 2008	Mount Lemmon	Mount Lemmon Survey	MAS	830 m	MPC · JPL
274113	2008 DW_{45}	—	February 28, 2008	Kitt Peak	Spacewatch	·	2.3 km	MPC · JPL
274114	2008 DU_{47}	—	February 28, 2008	Mount Lemmon	Mount Lemmon Survey	·	1.3 km	MPC · JPL
274115	2008 DX_{66}	—	February 29, 2008	Kitt Peak	Spacewatch	·	3.7 km	MPC · JPL
274116	2008 DW_{73}	—	February 27, 2008	Mount Lemmon	Mount Lemmon Survey	·	880 m	MPC · JPL
274117	2008 DX_{82}	—	February 28, 2008	Mount Lemmon	Mount Lemmon Survey	NYS	1.1 km	MPC · JPL
274118	2008 DH_{83}	—	February 29, 2008	Kitt Peak	Spacewatch	GEF	1.4 km	MPC · JPL
274119	2008 DG_{88}	—	February 18, 2008	Mount Lemmon	Mount Lemmon Survey	·	3.7 km	MPC · JPL
274120	2008 EJ_{2}	—	March 1, 2008	Mount Lemmon	Mount Lemmon Survey	·	1.5 km	MPC · JPL
274121	2008 EY_{40}	—	March 4, 2008	Kitt Peak	Spacewatch	·	2.5 km	MPC · JPL
274122	2008 EB_{43}	—	March 4, 2008	Mount Lemmon	Mount Lemmon Survey	NYS	1.3 km	MPC · JPL
274123	2008 EX_{46}	—	March 5, 2008	Mount Lemmon	Mount Lemmon Survey	·	1.4 km	MPC · JPL
274124	2008 ET_{47}	—	March 5, 2008	Kitt Peak	Spacewatch	·	1.6 km	MPC · JPL
274125	2008 EV_{47}	—	March 5, 2008	Kitt Peak	Spacewatch	·	1.1 km	MPC · JPL
274126	2008 EN_{52}	—	March 6, 2008	Kitt Peak	Spacewatch	·	1.8 km	MPC · JPL
274127	2008 ER_{54}	—	March 6, 2008	Kitt Peak	Spacewatch	·	3.2 km	MPC · JPL
274128	2008 EB_{60}	—	March 8, 2008	Catalina	CSS	·	980 m	MPC · JPL
274129	2008 EF_{89}	—	March 8, 2008	Socorro	LINEAR	·	4.9 km	MPC · JPL
274130	2008 EZ_{96}	—	March 7, 2008	Catalina	CSS	·	840 m	MPC · JPL
274131	2008 EE_{121}	—	March 9, 2008	Kitt Peak	Spacewatch	·	810 m	MPC · JPL
274132	2008 EF_{132}	—	March 11, 2008	Kitt Peak	Spacewatch	·	1.0 km	MPC · JPL
274133	2008 EA_{139}	—	March 11, 2008	Kitt Peak	Spacewatch	·	830 m	MPC · JPL
274134	2008 EU_{151}	—	March 9, 2008	Kitt Peak	Spacewatch	·	950 m	MPC · JPL
274135	2008 FN_{4}	—	March 25, 2008	Kitt Peak	Spacewatch	NYS	1.1 km	MPC · JPL
274136	2008 FP_{5}	—	March 28, 2008	Grove Creek	Tozzi, F.	NYS	1.5 km	MPC · JPL
274137 Angelaglinos	2008 FC_{6}	Angelaglinos	March 28, 2008	Vail-Jarnac	Jarnac	·	5.7 km	MPC · JPL
274138	2008 FU_{6}	—	March 29, 2008	Catalina	CSS	APO +1km	750 m	MPC · JPL
274139	2008 FE_{15}	—	March 26, 2008	Kitt Peak	Spacewatch	·	2.3 km	MPC · JPL
274140	2008 FS_{25}	—	March 27, 2008	Kitt Peak	Spacewatch	MAS	790 m	MPC · JPL
274141	2008 FV_{50}	—	March 28, 2008	Kitt Peak	Spacewatch	·	1.7 km	MPC · JPL
274142	2008 FW_{54}	—	March 28, 2008	Mount Lemmon	Mount Lemmon Survey	·	840 m	MPC · JPL
274143	2008 FF_{56}	—	March 28, 2008	Mount Lemmon	Mount Lemmon Survey	·	1.1 km	MPC · JPL
274144	2008 FP_{60}	—	March 29, 2008	Catalina	CSS	·	3.3 km	MPC · JPL
274145	2008 FX_{65}	—	March 28, 2008	Mount Lemmon	Mount Lemmon Survey	·	730 m	MPC · JPL
274146	2008 FD_{66}	—	March 28, 2008	Kitt Peak	Spacewatch	·	1.2 km	MPC · JPL
274147	2008 FE_{66}	—	March 28, 2008	Kitt Peak	Spacewatch	·	790 m	MPC · JPL
274148	2008 FU_{66}	—	March 28, 2008	Kitt Peak	Spacewatch	·	890 m	MPC · JPL
274149	2008 FA_{67}	—	March 28, 2008	Kitt Peak	Spacewatch	EOS	2.3 km	MPC · JPL
274150	2008 FK_{68}	—	March 28, 2008	Mount Lemmon	Mount Lemmon Survey	·	1.3 km	MPC · JPL
274151	2008 FS_{70}	—	March 28, 2008	Kitt Peak	Spacewatch	·	1.8 km	MPC · JPL
274152	2008 FB_{76}	—	March 31, 2008	Mount Lemmon	Mount Lemmon Survey	·	1.2 km	MPC · JPL
274153	2008 FX_{76}	—	March 27, 2008	Kitt Peak	Spacewatch	·	690 m	MPC · JPL
274154	2008 FJ_{97}	—	March 30, 2008	Kitt Peak	Spacewatch	·	1.9 km	MPC · JPL
274155	2008 FH_{102}	—	March 30, 2008	Kitt Peak	Spacewatch	·	990 m	MPC · JPL
274156	2008 FH_{103}	—	March 30, 2008	Kitt Peak	Spacewatch	·	930 m	MPC · JPL
274157	2008 FS_{103}	—	March 30, 2008	Kitt Peak	Spacewatch	·	1.3 km	MPC · JPL
274158	2008 FY_{104}	—	March 30, 2008	Kitt Peak	Spacewatch	·	1.1 km	MPC · JPL
274159	2008 FM_{105}	—	March 31, 2008	Kitt Peak	Spacewatch	·	850 m	MPC · JPL
274160	2008 FR_{113}	—	March 31, 2008	Kitt Peak	Spacewatch	EOS	4.4 km	MPC · JPL
274161	2008 FA_{116}	—	March 31, 2008	Mount Lemmon	Mount Lemmon Survey	KOR	1.7 km	MPC · JPL
274162	2008 FH_{124}	—	March 29, 2008	Kitt Peak	Spacewatch	·	640 m	MPC · JPL
274163	2008 FK_{125}	—	March 31, 2008	Kitt Peak	Spacewatch	·	840 m	MPC · JPL
274164	2008 FX_{126}	—	March 31, 2008	Kitt Peak	Spacewatch	·	900 m	MPC · JPL
274165	2008 FU_{128}	—	March 29, 2008	Mount Lemmon	Mount Lemmon Survey	·	630 m	MPC · JPL
274166	2008 FL_{129}	—	March 30, 2008	Kitt Peak	Spacewatch	·	1.3 km	MPC · JPL
274167	2008 FH_{130}	—	March 29, 2008	Kitt Peak	Spacewatch	·	860 m	MPC · JPL
274168	2008 GZ_{11}	—	April 1, 2008	Kitt Peak	Spacewatch	·	1.0 km	MPC · JPL
274169	2008 GB_{37}	—	April 3, 2008	Mount Lemmon	Mount Lemmon Survey	·	690 m	MPC · JPL
274170	2008 GB_{39}	—	April 3, 2008	Kitt Peak	Spacewatch	·	900 m	MPC · JPL
274171	2008 GM_{47}	—	April 4, 2008	Kitt Peak	Spacewatch	·	980 m	MPC · JPL
274172	2008 GZ_{47}	—	April 4, 2008	Kitt Peak	Spacewatch	·	1.6 km	MPC · JPL
274173	2008 GT_{60}	—	April 5, 2008	Catalina	CSS	(6769)	1.5 km	MPC · JPL
274174	2008 GT_{64}	—	April 6, 2008	Kitt Peak	Spacewatch	·	1.3 km	MPC · JPL
274175	2008 GC_{65}	—	April 6, 2008	Kitt Peak	Spacewatch	·	1.1 km	MPC · JPL
274176	2008 GW_{67}	—	April 6, 2008	Kitt Peak	Spacewatch	·	1.4 km	MPC · JPL
274177	2008 GE_{69}	—	April 6, 2008	Kitt Peak	Spacewatch	·	960 m	MPC · JPL
274178	2008 GJ_{69}	—	April 6, 2008	Kitt Peak	Spacewatch	·	1.8 km	MPC · JPL
274179	2008 GZ_{69}	—	April 6, 2008	Mount Lemmon	Mount Lemmon Survey	·	820 m	MPC · JPL
274180	2008 GB_{70}	—	April 6, 2008	Mount Lemmon	Mount Lemmon Survey	·	690 m	MPC · JPL
274181	2008 GN_{79}	—	April 7, 2008	Kitt Peak	Spacewatch	·	800 m	MPC · JPL
274182	2008 GA_{85}	—	April 8, 2008	Mount Lemmon	Mount Lemmon Survey	·	3.4 km	MPC · JPL
274183	2008 GT_{92}	—	April 6, 2008	Mount Lemmon	Mount Lemmon Survey	·	1.1 km	MPC · JPL
274184	2008 GX_{104}	—	April 11, 2008	Kitt Peak	Spacewatch	·	810 m	MPC · JPL
274185	2008 GG_{115}	—	April 11, 2008	Kitt Peak	Spacewatch	·	3.4 km	MPC · JPL
274186	2008 GH_{118}	—	April 11, 2008	Catalina	CSS	·	990 m	MPC · JPL
274187	2008 GG_{119}	—	April 11, 2008	Kitt Peak	Spacewatch	V	560 m	MPC · JPL
274188	2008 GL_{125}	—	April 14, 2008	Mount Lemmon	Mount Lemmon Survey	·	1.3 km	MPC · JPL
274189	2008 GG_{131}	—	April 7, 2008	Kitt Peak	Spacewatch	·	880 m	MPC · JPL
274190	2008 GB_{146}	—	April 14, 2008	Kitt Peak	Spacewatch	·	590 m	MPC · JPL
274191	2008 HU_{3}	—	April 28, 2008	La Sagra	OAM	NYS	1.4 km	MPC · JPL
274192	2008 HT_{6}	—	April 24, 2008	Kitt Peak	Spacewatch	·	1.2 km	MPC · JPL
274193	2008 HX_{12}	—	April 24, 2008	Kitt Peak	Spacewatch	·	940 m	MPC · JPL
274194	2008 HC_{14}	—	April 25, 2008	Kitt Peak	Spacewatch	·	1.2 km	MPC · JPL
274195	2008 HX_{16}	—	April 25, 2008	Kitt Peak	Spacewatch	MAS	730 m	MPC · JPL
274196	2008 HC_{21}	—	April 26, 2008	Kitt Peak	Spacewatch	·	780 m	MPC · JPL
274197	2008 HE_{21}	—	April 26, 2008	Kitt Peak	Spacewatch	·	970 m	MPC · JPL
274198	2008 HY_{22}	—	April 27, 2008	Kitt Peak	Spacewatch	·	910 m	MPC · JPL
274199	2008 HC_{31}	—	April 29, 2008	Kitt Peak	Spacewatch	·	2.3 km	MPC · JPL
274200	2008 HP_{33}	—	April 26, 2008	Kitt Peak	Spacewatch	·	1.5 km	MPC · JPL

== 274201–274300 ==
back to top

Designation			Discovery			Properties		Ref
Permanent	Provisional	Named after	Date	Site	Discoverer(s)	Category	Diam.	Ref
274201	2008 HY_{33}	—	April 27, 2008	Kitt Peak	Spacewatch	·	910 m	MPC · JPL
274202	2008 HJ_{44}	—	April 27, 2008	Mount Lemmon	Mount Lemmon Survey	MAS	810 m	MPC · JPL
274203	2008 HT_{44}	—	April 28, 2008	Kitt Peak	Spacewatch	·	700 m	MPC · JPL
274204	2008 HX_{50}	—	April 29, 2008	Kitt Peak	Spacewatch	·	1.1 km	MPC · JPL
274205	2008 HE_{52}	—	April 29, 2008	Mount Lemmon	Mount Lemmon Survey	·	600 m	MPC · JPL
274206	2008 HF_{55}	—	April 29, 2008	Kitt Peak	Spacewatch	·	1.5 km	MPC · JPL
274207	2008 HE_{58}	—	April 30, 2008	Mount Lemmon	Mount Lemmon Survey	·	840 m	MPC · JPL
274208	2008 HF_{62}	—	April 30, 2008	Kitt Peak	Spacewatch	·	920 m	MPC · JPL
274209	2008 HN_{65}	—	April 30, 2008	Kitt Peak	Spacewatch	·	1.1 km	MPC · JPL
274210	2008 HV_{66}	—	April 26, 2008	Kitt Peak	Spacewatch	·	770 m	MPC · JPL
274211	2008 HQ_{67}	—	April 30, 2008	Mount Lemmon	Mount Lemmon Survey	·	750 m	MPC · JPL
274212	2008 JX	—	May 1, 2008	Mount Lemmon	Mount Lemmon Survey	MAS	760 m	MPC · JPL
274213 Satriani	2008 JA_{6}	Satriani	May 5, 2008	Nogales	J.-C. Merlin	·	1.1 km	MPC · JPL
274214	2008 JY_{6}	—	May 2, 2008	Kitt Peak	Spacewatch	·	1.2 km	MPC · JPL
274215	2008 JA_{7}	—	May 2, 2008	Kitt Peak	Spacewatch	·	730 m	MPC · JPL
274216	2008 JK_{16}	—	May 3, 2008	Mount Lemmon	Mount Lemmon Survey	·	990 m	MPC · JPL
274217	2008 JO_{29}	—	May 13, 2008	Mount Lemmon	Mount Lemmon Survey	·	1.2 km	MPC · JPL
274218	2008 JU_{30}	—	May 11, 2008	Kitt Peak	Spacewatch	·	700 m	MPC · JPL
274219	2008 JB_{36}	—	May 3, 2008	Mount Lemmon	Mount Lemmon Survey	EOS	2.1 km	MPC · JPL
274220	2008 JG_{36}	—	May 3, 2008	Mount Lemmon	Mount Lemmon Survey	NYS	1.3 km	MPC · JPL
274221	2008 JY_{37}	—	May 13, 2008	Mount Lemmon	Mount Lemmon Survey	·	630 m	MPC · JPL
274222	2008 JS_{40}	—	May 15, 2008	Kitt Peak	Spacewatch	·	1.2 km	MPC · JPL
274223	2008 KV_{4}	—	May 27, 2008	Kitt Peak	Spacewatch	·	1.5 km	MPC · JPL
274224	2008 KU_{5}	—	May 28, 2008	Kitt Peak	Spacewatch	·	930 m	MPC · JPL
274225	2008 KR_{20}	—	May 28, 2008	Mount Lemmon	Mount Lemmon Survey	EUP	4.7 km	MPC · JPL
274226	2008 KX_{30}	—	May 29, 2008	Kitt Peak	Spacewatch	·	1.0 km	MPC · JPL
274227	2008 KF_{31}	—	May 29, 2008	Kitt Peak	Spacewatch	·	910 m	MPC · JPL
274228	2008 KR_{31}	—	May 29, 2008	Kitt Peak	Spacewatch	·	600 m	MPC · JPL
274229	2008 KL_{34}	—	May 31, 2008	Mount Lemmon	Mount Lemmon Survey	·	1.1 km	MPC · JPL
274230	2008 KU_{36}	—	May 29, 2008	Kitt Peak	Spacewatch	·	3.0 km	MPC · JPL
274231	2008 KJ_{40}	—	May 29, 2008	Grove Creek	Tozzi, F.	·	1.1 km	MPC · JPL
274232	2008 LL_{12}	—	June 2, 2008	Sierra Stars	Dillon, W. G., Wells, D.	·	1.6 km	MPC · JPL
274233	2008 LN_{15}	—	June 9, 2008	Kitt Peak	Spacewatch	·	1.1 km	MPC · JPL
274234	2008 LO_{16}	—	June 13, 2008	Calvin-Rehoboth	Calvin College	·	890 m	MPC · JPL
274235	2008 MJ_{2}	—	June 30, 2008	Kitt Peak	Spacewatch	·	1.9 km	MPC · JPL
274236	2008 MF_{5}	—	June 28, 2008	Siding Spring	SSS	·	2.1 km	MPC · JPL
274237	2008 MG_{5}	—	June 28, 2008	Siding Spring	SSS	·	1.9 km	MPC · JPL
274238	2008 NF_{1}	—	July 3, 2008	Pla D'Arguines	R. Ferrando	·	4.0 km	MPC · JPL
274239	2008 NK_{1}	—	July 3, 2008	Grove Creek	Tozzi, F.	·	3.0 km	MPC · JPL
274240	2008 NS_{2}	—	July 10, 2008	La Sagra	OAM	·	2.1 km	MPC · JPL
274241	2008 NH_{5}	—	July 5, 2008	Siding Spring	SSS	·	3.3 km	MPC · JPL
274242	2008 OW	—	July 26, 2008	La Sagra	OAM	·	750 m	MPC · JPL
274243	2008 OH_{3}	—	October 5, 2004	Palomar	NEAT	·	2.5 km	MPC · JPL
274244	2008 OL_{3}	—	July 27, 2008	Bisei SG Center	BATTeRS	·	830 m	MPC · JPL
274245	2008 OS_{6}	—	July 26, 2008	Siding Spring	SSS	·	2.9 km	MPC · JPL
274246 Reggiacaserta	2008 OY_{9}	Reggiacaserta	July 31, 2008	Vallemare Borbona	V. S. Casulli	·	1.7 km	MPC · JPL
274247	2008 OJ_{11}	—	July 31, 2008	La Sagra	OAM	·	1.5 km	MPC · JPL
274248	2008 OO_{12}	—	July 29, 2008	Socorro	LINEAR	·	2.3 km	MPC · JPL
274249	2008 OU_{13}	—	July 29, 2008	La Sagra	OAM	HYG	2.8 km	MPC · JPL
274250	2008 OH_{19}	—	July 29, 2008	Kitt Peak	Spacewatch	KOR	1.6 km	MPC · JPL
274251	2008 OQ_{19}	—	July 29, 2008	Kitt Peak	Spacewatch	·	2.5 km	MPC · JPL
274252	2008 OW_{19}	—	July 29, 2008	Kitt Peak	Spacewatch	·	910 m	MPC · JPL
274253	2008 OD_{20}	—	July 30, 2008	Kitt Peak	Spacewatch	·	3.3 km	MPC · JPL
274254	2008 OO_{20}	—	July 29, 2008	Kitt Peak	Spacewatch	·	1.7 km	MPC · JPL
274255	2008 OS_{20}	—	July 29, 2008	Kitt Peak	Spacewatch	KOR	1.5 km	MPC · JPL
274256	2008 OV_{20}	—	July 29, 2008	Kitt Peak	Spacewatch	NYS	1.0 km	MPC · JPL
274257	2008 OY_{20}	—	July 29, 2008	Kitt Peak	Spacewatch	·	2.3 km	MPC · JPL
274258	2008 OP_{21}	—	July 30, 2008	Kitt Peak	Spacewatch	·	1.3 km	MPC · JPL
274259	2008 OZ_{23}	—	July 31, 2008	Kitt Peak	Spacewatch	·	2.6 km	MPC · JPL
274260	2008 OH_{25}	—	July 29, 2008	Kitt Peak	Spacewatch	·	5.5 km	MPC · JPL
274261	2008 PS	—	August 1, 2008	Dauban	Kugel, F.	NYS	1.1 km	MPC · JPL
274262	2008 PT	—	August 1, 2008	Dauban	Kugel, F.	·	1.3 km	MPC · JPL
274263	2008 PJ_{5}	—	August 5, 2008	La Sagra	OAM	·	4.3 km	MPC · JPL
274264 Piccolomini	2008 PZ_{6}	Piccolomini	August 5, 2008	Vallemare Borbona	V. S. Casulli	·	2.2 km	MPC · JPL
274265	2008 PJ_{7}	—	August 5, 2008	La Sagra	OAM	·	2.9 km	MPC · JPL
274266	2008 PB_{8}	—	August 5, 2008	La Sagra	OAM	·	840 m	MPC · JPL
274267	2008 PG_{8}	—	August 6, 2008	La Sagra	OAM	·	2.7 km	MPC · JPL
274268	2008 PQ_{9}	—	August 8, 2008	Dauban	Kugel, F.	·	1.8 km	MPC · JPL
274269	2008 PM_{11}	—	August 8, 2008	Reedy Creek	J. Broughton	·	1.3 km	MPC · JPL
274270	2008 PP_{11}	—	August 9, 2008	Reedy Creek	J. Broughton	·	2.1 km	MPC · JPL
274271	2008 PZ_{11}	—	August 10, 2008	Pla D'Arguines	R. Ferrando	·	730 m	MPC · JPL
274272	2008 PC_{12}	—	August 10, 2008	Pla D'Arguines	R. Ferrando	L4	8.8 km	MPC · JPL
274273	2008 PQ_{12}	—	August 9, 2008	La Sagra	OAM	·	1.5 km	MPC · JPL
274274	2008 PB_{13}	—	August 10, 2008	La Sagra	OAM	·	1.1 km	MPC · JPL
274275	2008 PG_{14}	—	August 10, 2008	La Sagra	OAM	·	850 m	MPC · JPL
274276	2008 PA_{16}	—	August 8, 2008	Reedy Creek	J. Broughton	·	820 m	MPC · JPL
274277	2008 PU_{18}	—	August 5, 2008	Siding Spring	SSS	·	4.5 km	MPC · JPL
274278	2008 PM_{20}	—	August 6, 2008	Siding Spring	SSS	·	2.0 km	MPC · JPL
274279	2008 PK_{21}	—	August 6, 2008	Siding Spring	SSS	·	2.3 km	MPC · JPL
274280	2008 PQ_{21}	—	August 6, 2008	Siding Spring	SSS	·	3.2 km	MPC · JPL
274281	2008 QK_{2}	—	August 24, 2008	La Sagra	OAM	·	1.8 km	MPC · JPL
274282	2008 QW_{2}	—	August 24, 2008	Marly	P. Kocher	·	2.4 km	MPC · JPL
274283	2008 QX_{2}	—	August 24, 2008	Dauban	Kugel, F.	NYS	1.8 km	MPC · JPL
274284	2008 QM_{6}	—	August 25, 2008	Dauban	Kugel, F.	PHO	2.8 km	MPC · JPL
274285	2008 QJ_{8}	—	August 25, 2008	La Sagra	OAM	·	2.3 km	MPC · JPL
274286	2008 QB_{9}	—	August 25, 2008	La Sagra	OAM	HOF	3.0 km	MPC · JPL
274287	2008 QO_{9}	—	August 25, 2008	La Sagra	OAM	·	1.8 km	MPC · JPL
274288	2008 QC_{10}	—	August 26, 2008	La Sagra	OAM	·	3.9 km	MPC · JPL
274289	2008 QV_{12}	—	August 26, 2008	La Sagra	OAM	·	2.6 km	MPC · JPL
274290 Lechnerödön	2008 QX_{13}	Lechnerödön	August 27, 2008	Piszkéstető	K. Sárneczky	·	2.4 km	MPC · JPL
274291	2008 QF_{14}	—	August 21, 2008	Kitt Peak	Spacewatch	·	1.8 km	MPC · JPL
274292	2008 QQ_{16}	—	August 26, 2008	La Sagra	OAM	·	3.2 km	MPC · JPL
274293	2008 QU_{16}	—	August 26, 2008	La Sagra	OAM	·	3.5 km	MPC · JPL
274294	2008 QR_{17}	—	February 26, 2007	Mount Lemmon	Mount Lemmon Survey	·	2.0 km	MPC · JPL
274295	2008 QN_{18}	—	August 28, 2008	Pla D'Arguines	R. Ferrando	THM	2.5 km	MPC · JPL
274296	2008 QJ_{19}	—	August 27, 2008	Kleť	Kleť	·	5.3 km	MPC · JPL
274297	2008 QN_{19}	—	August 29, 2008	Hibiscus	S. F. Hönig, Teamo, N.	·	4.2 km	MPC · JPL
274298	2008 QL_{22}	—	August 26, 2008	Socorro	LINEAR	·	4.5 km	MPC · JPL
274299	2008 QM_{22}	—	August 26, 2008	Socorro	LINEAR	·	4.6 km	MPC · JPL
274300 UNESCO	2008 QG_{24}	UNESCO	August 25, 2008	Andrushivka	Andrushivka	·	1.6 km	MPC · JPL

== 274301–274400 ==
back to top

Designation			Discovery			Properties		Ref
Permanent	Provisional	Named after	Date	Site	Discoverer(s)	Category	Diam.	Ref
274301 Wikipedia	2008 QH_{24}	Wikipedia	August 25, 2008	Andrushivka	Andrushivka	V · fast	910 m	MPC · JPL
274302 Abaházi	2008 QD_{25}	Abaházi	August 24, 2008	Piszkéstető	K. Sárneczky	·	4.3 km	MPC · JPL
274303	2008 QW_{25}	—	August 24, 2008	La Sagra	OAM	·	2.8 km	MPC · JPL
274304	2008 QW_{33}	—	August 27, 2008	La Sagra	OAM	·	2.1 km	MPC · JPL
274305	2008 QE_{34}	—	August 29, 2008	La Sagra	OAM	·	3.4 km	MPC · JPL
274306	2008 QH_{36}	—	August 22, 2008	Kitt Peak	Spacewatch	·	1.4 km	MPC · JPL
274307	2008 QX_{36}	—	August 21, 2008	Kitt Peak	Spacewatch	AGN	1.5 km	MPC · JPL
274308	2008 QN_{37}	—	August 21, 2008	Kitt Peak	Spacewatch	KOR	2.0 km	MPC · JPL
274309	2008 QX_{38}	—	August 24, 2008	Kitt Peak	Spacewatch	·	1.4 km	MPC · JPL
274310	2008 QZ_{38}	—	August 24, 2008	Kitt Peak	Spacewatch	·	2.7 km	MPC · JPL
274311	2008 QX_{39}	—	August 25, 2008	La Sagra	OAM	·	2.3 km	MPC · JPL
274312	2008 QH_{41}	—	August 21, 2008	Kitt Peak	Spacewatch	KOR	1.5 km	MPC · JPL
274313	2008 QE_{42}	—	August 23, 2008	Kitt Peak	Spacewatch	·	3.4 km	MPC · JPL
274314	2008 QC_{45}	—	August 24, 2008	Kitt Peak	Spacewatch	·	2.6 km	MPC · JPL
274315	2008 QG_{45}	—	August 26, 2008	Socorro	LINEAR	GEF	1.8 km	MPC · JPL
274316	2008 QB_{47}	—	August 24, 2008	Socorro	LINEAR	·	2.4 km	MPC · JPL
274317	2008 QJ_{48}	—	August 30, 2008	Socorro	LINEAR	EOS	2.5 km	MPC · JPL
274318	2008 RK	—	September 1, 2008	Hibiscus	S. F. Hönig, Teamo, N.	WIT	1.6 km	MPC · JPL
274319	2008 RG_{4}	—	September 2, 2008	Kitt Peak	Spacewatch	·	2.3 km	MPC · JPL
274320	2008 RQ_{4}	—	September 2, 2008	Kitt Peak	Spacewatch	·	1.7 km	MPC · JPL
274321	2008 RK_{5}	—	September 2, 2008	Kitt Peak	Spacewatch	·	3.8 km	MPC · JPL
274322	2008 RP_{5}	—	September 2, 2008	Kitt Peak	Spacewatch	·	1.4 km	MPC · JPL
274323	2008 RT_{5}	—	September 2, 2008	Kitt Peak	Spacewatch	MAS	990 m	MPC · JPL
274324	2008 RK_{8}	—	September 3, 2008	Kitt Peak	Spacewatch	·	3.7 km	MPC · JPL
274325	2008 RR_{9}	—	September 3, 2008	Kitt Peak	Spacewatch	·	2.6 km	MPC · JPL
274326	2008 RZ_{9}	—	September 3, 2008	Kitt Peak	Spacewatch	·	2.5 km	MPC · JPL
274327	2008 RS_{11}	—	September 3, 2008	Kitt Peak	Spacewatch	·	3.1 km	MPC · JPL
274328	2008 RX_{11}	—	September 3, 2008	Kitt Peak	Spacewatch	KOR	1.6 km	MPC · JPL
274329	2008 RC_{16}	—	September 4, 2008	Kitt Peak	Spacewatch	·	3.5 km	MPC · JPL
274330	2008 RW_{16}	—	September 4, 2008	Kitt Peak	Spacewatch	·	1.3 km	MPC · JPL
274331	2008 RF_{19}	—	September 4, 2008	Kitt Peak	Spacewatch	·	2.2 km	MPC · JPL
274332	2008 RU_{20}	—	September 4, 2008	Kitt Peak	Spacewatch	·	4.5 km	MPC · JPL
274333 Voznyukigor	2008 RT_{21}	Voznyukigor	September 2, 2008	Andrushivka	Andrushivka	·	2.6 km	MPC · JPL
274334 Kyivplaniy	2008 RP_{22}	Kyivplaniy	September 3, 2008	Andrushivka	Andrushivka	·	2.5 km	MPC · JPL
274335	2008 RW_{22}	—	September 5, 2008	Wrightwood	J. W. Young	·	4.3 km	MPC · JPL
274336	2008 RF_{23}	—	September 4, 2008	Socorro	LINEAR	(5)	1.7 km	MPC · JPL
274337	2008 RP_{25}	—	September 5, 2008	Goodricke-Pigott	R. A. Tucker	·	4.5 km	MPC · JPL
274338	2008 RV_{29}	—	September 2, 2008	Kitt Peak	Spacewatch	CYB	6.0 km	MPC · JPL
274339	2008 RE_{31}	—	September 2, 2008	Kitt Peak	Spacewatch	·	2.0 km	MPC · JPL
274340	2008 RE_{32}	—	September 2, 2008	Kitt Peak	Spacewatch	·	2.1 km	MPC · JPL
274341	2008 RS_{34}	—	September 2, 2008	Kitt Peak	Spacewatch	·	3.8 km	MPC · JPL
274342	2008 RT_{34}	—	September 2, 2008	Kitt Peak	Spacewatch	·	1.4 km	MPC · JPL
274343	2008 RH_{35}	—	September 2, 2008	Kitt Peak	Spacewatch	EOS	2.1 km	MPC · JPL
274344	2008 RM_{35}	—	September 2, 2008	Kitt Peak	Spacewatch	T_{j} (2.98) · 3:2	5.8 km	MPC · JPL
274345	2008 RC_{37}	—	September 2, 2008	Kitt Peak	Spacewatch	KON	3.1 km	MPC · JPL
274346	2008 RS_{37}	—	September 2, 2008	Kitt Peak	Spacewatch	EOS	2.2 km	MPC · JPL
274347	2008 RU_{37}	—	September 2, 2008	Kitt Peak	Spacewatch	·	2.9 km	MPC · JPL
274348	2008 RP_{38}	—	September 2, 2008	Kitt Peak	Spacewatch	·	3.2 km	MPC · JPL
274349	2008 RP_{39}	—	September 2, 2008	Kitt Peak	Spacewatch	·	3.1 km	MPC · JPL
274350	2008 RB_{40}	—	September 2, 2008	Kitt Peak	Spacewatch	KOR	1.5 km	MPC · JPL
274351	2008 RD_{41}	—	September 2, 2008	Kitt Peak	Spacewatch	MIS	2.1 km	MPC · JPL
274352	2008 RH_{41}	—	September 2, 2008	Kitt Peak	Spacewatch	NEM	3.0 km	MPC · JPL
274353	2008 RA_{47}	—	September 2, 2008	Kitt Peak	Spacewatch	·	2.2 km	MPC · JPL
274354	2008 RN_{47}	—	September 2, 2008	La Sagra	OAM	·	1.1 km	MPC · JPL
274355	2008 RL_{62}	—	September 4, 2008	Kitt Peak	Spacewatch	·	2.4 km	MPC · JPL
274356	2008 RE_{63}	—	September 4, 2008	Kitt Peak	Spacewatch	·	2.6 km	MPC · JPL
274357	2008 RN_{65}	—	September 4, 2008	Kitt Peak	Spacewatch	MAS	990 m	MPC · JPL
274358	2008 RJ_{66}	—	September 4, 2008	Kitt Peak	Spacewatch	KOR	2.3 km	MPC · JPL
274359	2008 RW_{66}	—	September 4, 2008	Kitt Peak	Spacewatch	·	2.0 km	MPC · JPL
274360	2008 RM_{68}	—	September 4, 2008	Kitt Peak	Spacewatch	ADE	2.7 km	MPC · JPL
274361	2008 RY_{68}	—	September 4, 2008	Kitt Peak	Spacewatch	TEL	1.4 km	MPC · JPL
274362	2008 RH_{69}	—	September 4, 2008	Kitt Peak	Spacewatch	·	3.2 km	MPC · JPL
274363	2008 RZ_{69}	—	September 5, 2008	Kitt Peak	Spacewatch	·	2.0 km	MPC · JPL
274364	2008 RP_{71}	—	September 6, 2008	Mount Lemmon	Mount Lemmon Survey	·	2.2 km	MPC · JPL
274365	2008 RD_{72}	—	September 6, 2008	Mount Lemmon	Mount Lemmon Survey	MAR	1.3 km	MPC · JPL
274366	2008 RP_{72}	—	September 6, 2008	Mount Lemmon	Mount Lemmon Survey	·	1.5 km	MPC · JPL
274367	2008 RW_{72}	—	September 6, 2008	Mount Lemmon	Mount Lemmon Survey	AGN	1.4 km	MPC · JPL
274368	2008 RH_{74}	—	September 6, 2008	Catalina	CSS	·	3.0 km	MPC · JPL
274369	2008 RL_{75}	—	September 6, 2008	Catalina	CSS	·	4.2 km	MPC · JPL
274370	2008 RC_{76}	—	December 16, 1999	Kitt Peak	Spacewatch	KOR	1.6 km	MPC · JPL
274371	2008 RF_{77}	—	September 6, 2008	Catalina	CSS	·	4.3 km	MPC · JPL
274372	2008 RK_{77}	—	September 6, 2008	Catalina	CSS	·	2.3 km	MPC · JPL
274373	2008 RU_{77}	—	September 7, 2008	Mount Lemmon	Mount Lemmon Survey	KOR	2.3 km	MPC · JPL
274374	2008 RP_{78}	—	September 5, 2008	Kitt Peak	Spacewatch	NEM	2.9 km	MPC · JPL
274375	2008 RS_{80}	—	September 3, 2008	Kitt Peak	Spacewatch	·	4.2 km	MPC · JPL
274376	2008 RF_{86}	—	September 5, 2008	Kitt Peak	Spacewatch	·	2.0 km	MPC · JPL
274377	2008 RP_{89}	—	September 5, 2008	Kitt Peak	Spacewatch	·	5.5 km	MPC · JPL
274378	2008 RH_{95}	—	September 7, 2008	Catalina	CSS	V	830 m	MPC · JPL
274379	2008 RX_{95}	—	September 7, 2008	Catalina	CSS	·	1.9 km	MPC · JPL
274380	2008 RT_{99}	—	September 2, 2008	Kitt Peak	Spacewatch	·	2.1 km	MPC · JPL
274381	2008 RA_{100}	—	September 2, 2008	Kitt Peak	Spacewatch	DOR	3.0 km	MPC · JPL
274382	2008 RE_{100}	—	September 2, 2008	Kitt Peak	Spacewatch	·	2.6 km	MPC · JPL
274383	2008 RU_{100}	—	September 5, 2008	Kitt Peak	Spacewatch	·	2.8 km	MPC · JPL
274384	2008 RU_{104}	—	September 6, 2008	Catalina	CSS	·	5.7 km	MPC · JPL
274385	2008 RC_{105}	—	September 6, 2008	Catalina	CSS	·	4.0 km	MPC · JPL
274386	2008 RY_{106}	—	September 7, 2008	Catalina	CSS	·	3.2 km	MPC · JPL
274387	2008 RE_{107}	—	September 7, 2008	Mount Lemmon	Mount Lemmon Survey	EOS	2.2 km	MPC · JPL
274388	2008 RH_{107}	—	September 7, 2008	Mount Lemmon	Mount Lemmon Survey	·	2.0 km	MPC · JPL
274389	2008 RS_{107}	—	September 9, 2008	Bergisch Gladbach	W. Bickel	·	2.9 km	MPC · JPL
274390	2008 RB_{109}	—	September 2, 2008	Kitt Peak	Spacewatch	·	1.3 km	MPC · JPL
274391	2008 RT_{109}	—	September 2, 2008	Kitt Peak	Spacewatch	·	1.7 km	MPC · JPL
274392	2008 RG_{110}	—	September 3, 2008	Kitt Peak	Spacewatch	EUN	1.5 km	MPC · JPL
274393	2008 RN_{112}	—	September 5, 2008	Kitt Peak	Spacewatch	EOS	2.9 km	MPC · JPL
274394	2008 RD_{113}	—	September 5, 2008	Kitt Peak	Spacewatch	EOS	2.2 km	MPC · JPL
274395	2008 RY_{113}	—	September 6, 2008	Kitt Peak	Spacewatch	·	1.3 km	MPC · JPL
274396	2008 RF_{114}	—	September 6, 2008	Mount Lemmon	Mount Lemmon Survey	·	1.9 km	MPC · JPL
274397	2008 RB_{115}	—	September 6, 2008	Mount Lemmon	Mount Lemmon Survey	·	2.1 km	MPC · JPL
274398	2008 RY_{121}	—	September 3, 2008	Kitt Peak	Spacewatch	·	2.5 km	MPC · JPL
274399	2008 RQ_{122}	—	September 4, 2008	Kitt Peak	Spacewatch	·	1.2 km	MPC · JPL
274400	2008 RP_{124}	—	September 6, 2008	Kitt Peak	Spacewatch	·	3.2 km	MPC · JPL

== 274401–274500 ==
back to top

Designation			Discovery			Properties		Ref
Permanent	Provisional	Named after	Date	Site	Discoverer(s)	Category	Diam.	Ref
274401	2008 RW_{124}	—	September 6, 2008	Kitt Peak	Spacewatch	L4	10 km	MPC · JPL
274402	2008 RW_{125}	—	September 9, 2008	Mount Lemmon	Mount Lemmon Survey	NEM	2.5 km	MPC · JPL
274403	2008 RH_{128}	—	September 7, 2008	Mount Lemmon	Mount Lemmon Survey	·	4.4 km	MPC · JPL
274404	2008 RT_{128}	—	September 4, 2008	Kitt Peak	Spacewatch	L4	9.0 km	MPC · JPL
274405	2008 RV_{130}	—	September 4, 2008	Kitt Peak	Spacewatch	KOR	1.7 km	MPC · JPL
274406	2008 RD_{134}	—	September 6, 2008	Catalina	CSS	PAD	3.1 km	MPC · JPL
274407	2008 RN_{134}	—	September 7, 2008	Catalina	CSS	·	2.4 km	MPC · JPL
274408	2008 RU_{138}	—	September 6, 2008	Catalina	CSS	HOF	4.6 km	MPC · JPL
274409	2008 RU_{140}	—	September 9, 2008	Mount Lemmon	Mount Lemmon Survey	·	5.7 km	MPC · JPL
274410	2008 RG_{141}	—	September 6, 2008	Catalina	CSS	·	1.7 km	MPC · JPL
274411	2008 RF_{144}	—	September 2, 2008	Kitt Peak	Spacewatch	·	3.5 km	MPC · JPL
274412	2008 RH_{145}	—	September 2, 2008	Kitt Peak	Spacewatch	·	2.0 km	MPC · JPL
274413	2008 SC_{3}	—	September 22, 2008	Socorro	LINEAR	·	3.1 km	MPC · JPL
274414	2008 SL_{4}	—	September 22, 2008	Socorro	LINEAR	(1298)	5.1 km	MPC · JPL
274415	2008 SB_{5}	—	September 22, 2008	Socorro	LINEAR	·	2.9 km	MPC · JPL
274416	2008 SE_{7}	—	September 22, 2008	Skylive	Tozzi, F.	·	3.1 km	MPC · JPL
274417	2008 SN_{10}	—	September 22, 2008	Socorro	LINEAR	KOR	1.7 km	MPC · JPL
274418	2008 SS_{10}	—	September 22, 2008	Socorro	LINEAR	THM	2.6 km	MPC · JPL
274419	2008 SQ_{12}	—	September 20, 2008	Mount Lemmon	Mount Lemmon Survey	·	3.0 km	MPC · JPL
274420	2008 SP_{13}	—	September 19, 2008	Kitt Peak	Spacewatch	·	2.5 km	MPC · JPL
274421	2008 SN_{15}	—	September 19, 2008	Kitt Peak	Spacewatch	·	2.7 km	MPC · JPL
274422	2008 SN_{17}	—	September 19, 2008	Kitt Peak	Spacewatch	·	800 m	MPC · JPL
274423	2008 SP_{17}	—	September 19, 2008	Kitt Peak	Spacewatch	·	2.2 km	MPC · JPL
274424	2008 SY_{20}	—	September 19, 2008	Kitt Peak	Spacewatch	·	1.5 km	MPC · JPL
274425	2008 SA_{21}	—	September 19, 2008	Kitt Peak	Spacewatch	HYG	2.7 km	MPC · JPL
274426	2008 SY_{27}	—	September 19, 2008	Kitt Peak	Spacewatch	·	1.2 km	MPC · JPL
274427	2008 SE_{29}	—	September 19, 2008	Kitt Peak	Spacewatch	·	4.0 km	MPC · JPL
274428	2008 SX_{29}	—	September 19, 2008	Kitt Peak	Spacewatch	·	2.0 km	MPC · JPL
274429	2008 SA_{30}	—	September 19, 2008	Kitt Peak	Spacewatch	·	2.4 km	MPC · JPL
274430	2008 SF_{31}	—	September 20, 2008	Catalina	CSS	·	840 m	MPC · JPL
274431	2008 SJ_{31}	—	September 20, 2008	Kitt Peak	Spacewatch	·	3.1 km	MPC · JPL
274432	2008 SK_{31}	—	September 20, 2008	Kitt Peak	Spacewatch	EOS	1.9 km	MPC · JPL
274433	2008 SZ_{35}	—	September 20, 2008	Kitt Peak	Spacewatch	·	1.3 km	MPC · JPL
274434	2008 SP_{36}	—	September 20, 2008	Mount Lemmon	Mount Lemmon Survey	EOS	2.3 km	MPC · JPL
274435	2008 SR_{37}	—	September 20, 2008	Kitt Peak	Spacewatch	·	1.4 km	MPC · JPL
274436	2008 SC_{39}	—	September 20, 2008	Kitt Peak	Spacewatch	TEL	1.8 km	MPC · JPL
274437	2008 SG_{39}	—	September 20, 2008	Kitt Peak	Spacewatch	·	3.2 km	MPC · JPL
274438	2008 SM_{41}	—	September 20, 2008	Catalina	CSS	·	5.2 km	MPC · JPL
274439	2008 SS_{43}	—	September 20, 2008	Kitt Peak	Spacewatch	·	3.6 km	MPC · JPL
274440	2008 SQ_{44}	—	September 20, 2008	Mount Lemmon	Mount Lemmon Survey	·	5.0 km	MPC · JPL
274441	2008 SZ_{44}	—	September 20, 2008	Kitt Peak	Spacewatch	·	5.0 km	MPC · JPL
274442	2008 SP_{45}	—	September 20, 2008	Kitt Peak	Spacewatch	·	5.0 km	MPC · JPL
274443	2008 SH_{47}	—	September 20, 2008	Kitt Peak	Spacewatch	·	2.0 km	MPC · JPL
274444	2008 SR_{47}	—	September 20, 2008	Catalina	CSS	HOF	3.8 km	MPC · JPL
274445	2008 SC_{48}	—	September 20, 2008	Mount Lemmon	Mount Lemmon Survey	·	3.0 km	MPC · JPL
274446	2008 ST_{48}	—	September 20, 2008	Mount Lemmon	Mount Lemmon Survey	EOS	2.6 km	MPC · JPL
274447	2008 SJ_{49}	—	September 20, 2008	Mount Lemmon	Mount Lemmon Survey	·	5.1 km	MPC · JPL
274448	2008 SY_{49}	—	September 20, 2008	Mount Lemmon	Mount Lemmon Survey	·	1.9 km	MPC · JPL
274449	2008 SP_{50}	—	September 20, 2008	Mount Lemmon	Mount Lemmon Survey	KOR	1.8 km	MPC · JPL
274450	2008 SF_{52}	—	September 20, 2008	Mount Lemmon	Mount Lemmon Survey	·	2.7 km	MPC · JPL
274451	2008 SK_{52}	—	September 20, 2008	Mount Lemmon	Mount Lemmon Survey	·	2.0 km	MPC · JPL
274452	2008 SM_{53}	—	September 20, 2008	Mount Lemmon	Mount Lemmon Survey	·	4.8 km	MPC · JPL
274453	2008 SX_{55}	—	September 20, 2008	Kitt Peak	Spacewatch	VER	4.2 km	MPC · JPL
274454	2008 SE_{57}	—	September 20, 2008	Kitt Peak	Spacewatch	·	3.9 km	MPC · JPL
274455	2008 SZ_{58}	—	September 20, 2008	Kitt Peak	Spacewatch	·	3.0 km	MPC · JPL
274456	2008 SZ_{60}	—	September 20, 2008	Catalina	CSS	NYS	1.3 km	MPC · JPL
274457	2008 SA_{62}	—	September 21, 2008	Kitt Peak	Spacewatch	·	1.9 km	MPC · JPL
274458	2008 SR_{63}	—	September 21, 2008	Kitt Peak	Spacewatch	·	3.2 km	MPC · JPL
274459	2008 SX_{64}	—	September 21, 2008	Mount Lemmon	Mount Lemmon Survey	·	1.2 km	MPC · JPL
274460	2008 SG_{65}	—	September 21, 2008	Mount Lemmon	Mount Lemmon Survey	·	3.8 km	MPC · JPL
274461	2008 SB_{66}	—	September 21, 2008	Mount Lemmon	Mount Lemmon Survey	·	3.2 km	MPC · JPL
274462	2008 SQ_{67}	—	September 21, 2008	Kitt Peak	Spacewatch	·	3.4 km	MPC · JPL
274463	2008 ST_{67}	—	September 21, 2008	Catalina	CSS	·	3.9 km	MPC · JPL
274464	2008 SZ_{68}	—	September 22, 2008	Kitt Peak	Spacewatch	HOF	3.0 km	MPC · JPL
274465	2008 SS_{69}	—	September 22, 2008	Mount Lemmon	Mount Lemmon Survey	CYB	5.3 km	MPC · JPL
274466	2008 SU_{69}	—	September 22, 2008	Kitt Peak	Spacewatch	HOF	3.3 km	MPC · JPL
274467	2008 SJ_{79}	—	September 23, 2008	Mount Lemmon	Mount Lemmon Survey	·	2.6 km	MPC · JPL
274468	2008 SL_{80}	—	September 23, 2008	Catalina	CSS	·	4.3 km	MPC · JPL
274469	2008 SR_{81}	—	September 23, 2008	Marly	P. Kocher	·	2.6 km	MPC · JPL
274470	2008 SM_{82}	—	September 22, 2008	Hibiscus	Teamo, N.	·	2.9 km	MPC · JPL
274471	2008 SX_{82}	—	September 26, 2008	Bisei SG Center	BATTeRS	·	2.4 km	MPC · JPL
274472 Pietà	2008 SV_{83}	Pietà	September 28, 2008	Vallemare Borbona	V. S. Casulli	·	2.2 km	MPC · JPL
274473	2008 SL_{87}	—	September 20, 2008	Kitt Peak	Spacewatch	EOS	2.4 km	MPC · JPL
274474	2008 SP_{89}	—	September 21, 2008	Kitt Peak	Spacewatch	·	3.4 km	MPC · JPL
274475	2008 SY_{90}	—	September 21, 2008	Kitt Peak	Spacewatch	·	1.9 km	MPC · JPL
274476	2008 SJ_{93}	—	September 21, 2008	Kitt Peak	Spacewatch	·	2.7 km	MPC · JPL
274477	2008 ST_{95}	—	September 21, 2008	Kitt Peak	Spacewatch	GEF	1.9 km	MPC · JPL
274478	2008 SR_{96}	—	September 21, 2008	Kitt Peak	Spacewatch	EOS	2.4 km	MPC · JPL
274479	2008 SG_{100}	—	September 21, 2008	Kitt Peak	Spacewatch	·	2.1 km	MPC · JPL
274480	2008 SX_{100}	—	September 21, 2008	Kitt Peak	Spacewatch	·	3.2 km	MPC · JPL
274481	2008 SH_{101}	—	September 21, 2008	Kitt Peak	Spacewatch	MRX	1.2 km	MPC · JPL
274482	2008 SC_{102}	—	September 21, 2008	Kitt Peak	Spacewatch	·	2.0 km	MPC · JPL
274483	2008 SE_{102}	—	September 21, 2008	Kitt Peak	Spacewatch	·	1.8 km	MPC · JPL
274484	2008 SP_{104}	—	September 21, 2008	Kitt Peak	Spacewatch	·	2.2 km	MPC · JPL
274485	2008 SU_{104}	—	September 21, 2008	Kitt Peak	Spacewatch	·	2.8 km	MPC · JPL
274486	2008 SZ_{104}	—	September 21, 2008	Kitt Peak	Spacewatch	·	1.8 km	MPC · JPL
274487	2008 SQ_{109}	—	September 22, 2008	Kitt Peak	Spacewatch	·	4.8 km	MPC · JPL
274488	2008 SU_{109}	—	September 22, 2008	Kitt Peak	Spacewatch	·	2.5 km	MPC · JPL
274489	2008 SD_{111}	—	September 22, 2008	Kitt Peak	Spacewatch	·	1.9 km	MPC · JPL
274490	2008 SY_{115}	—	September 22, 2008	Kitt Peak	Spacewatch	·	4.3 km	MPC · JPL
274491	2008 SF_{116}	—	September 22, 2008	Kitt Peak	Spacewatch	·	2.3 km	MPC · JPL
274492	2008 SJ_{116}	—	September 22, 2008	Kitt Peak	Spacewatch	·	2.7 km	MPC · JPL
274493	2008 SM_{118}	—	September 22, 2008	Mount Lemmon	Mount Lemmon Survey	·	3.1 km	MPC · JPL
274494	2008 SN_{124}	—	September 22, 2008	Mount Lemmon	Mount Lemmon Survey	·	3.3 km	MPC · JPL
274495	2008 SD_{125}	—	September 22, 2008	Mount Lemmon	Mount Lemmon Survey	JUN	1.7 km	MPC · JPL
274496	2008 SA_{128}	—	September 22, 2008	Kitt Peak	Spacewatch	·	2.1 km	MPC · JPL
274497	2008 SE_{129}	—	September 22, 2008	Kitt Peak	Spacewatch	·	4.8 km	MPC · JPL
274498	2008 SD_{132}	—	September 22, 2008	Kitt Peak	Spacewatch	·	3.5 km	MPC · JPL
274499	2008 SJ_{132}	—	September 22, 2008	Kitt Peak	Spacewatch	·	3.3 km	MPC · JPL
274500	2008 SZ_{133}	—	September 23, 2008	Kitt Peak	Spacewatch	NEM	3.5 km	MPC · JPL

== 274501–274600 ==
back to top

Designation			Discovery			Properties		Ref
Permanent	Provisional	Named after	Date	Site	Discoverer(s)	Category	Diam.	Ref
274501	2008 ST_{135}	—	September 23, 2008	Mount Lemmon	Mount Lemmon Survey	HOF	3.7 km	MPC · JPL
274502	2008 SF_{137}	—	September 23, 2008	Catalina	CSS	EUN	2.3 km	MPC · JPL
274503	2008 SC_{139}	—	September 23, 2008	Kitt Peak	Spacewatch	·	3.5 km	MPC · JPL
274504	2008 SU_{140}	—	September 24, 2008	Mount Lemmon	Mount Lemmon Survey	EOS	2.4 km	MPC · JPL
274505	2008 SP_{142}	—	September 24, 2008	Mount Lemmon	Mount Lemmon Survey	EOS	2.2 km	MPC · JPL
274506	2008 SV_{144}	—	September 25, 2008	Kitt Peak	Spacewatch	L4	7.2 km	MPC · JPL
274507	2008 SP_{147}	—	September 25, 2008	Bergisch Gladbach	W. Bickel	·	3.6 km	MPC · JPL
274508	2008 SA_{150}	—	September 29, 2008	Dauban	Kugel, F.	AEO	1.7 km	MPC · JPL
274509	2008 SK_{153}	—	September 22, 2008	Socorro	LINEAR	·	2.2 km	MPC · JPL
274510	2008 SG_{155}	—	September 23, 2008	Socorro	LINEAR	KOR	1.8 km	MPC · JPL
274511	2008 SW_{158}	—	September 24, 2008	Socorro	LINEAR	·	2.4 km	MPC · JPL
274512	2008 SP_{159}	—	September 24, 2008	Socorro	LINEAR	LIX	5.1 km	MPC · JPL
274513	2008 SE_{160}	—	September 24, 2008	Socorro	LINEAR	EOS	2.2 km	MPC · JPL
274514	2008 SA_{161}	—	September 28, 2008	Socorro	LINEAR	·	2.1 km	MPC · JPL
274515	2008 SO_{161}	—	September 28, 2008	Socorro	LINEAR	·	4.7 km	MPC · JPL
274516	2008 SF_{162}	—	September 28, 2008	Socorro	LINEAR	·	1.2 km	MPC · JPL
274517	2008 ST_{163}	—	September 28, 2008	Socorro	LINEAR	·	2.8 km	MPC · JPL
274518	2008 SB_{167}	—	September 28, 2008	Socorro	LINEAR	·	3.6 km	MPC · JPL
274519	2008 SV_{172}	—	September 22, 2008	Kitt Peak	Spacewatch	·	3.7 km	MPC · JPL
274520	2008 SN_{178}	—	September 23, 2008	Siding Spring	SSS	·	3.3 km	MPC · JPL
274521	2008 SA_{183}	—	September 24, 2008	Mount Lemmon	Mount Lemmon Survey	·	2.8 km	MPC · JPL
274522	2008 SC_{189}	—	September 25, 2008	Mount Lemmon	Mount Lemmon Survey	·	2.2 km	MPC · JPL
274523	2008 SK_{189}	—	September 25, 2008	Kitt Peak	Spacewatch	(21344)	2.0 km	MPC · JPL
274524	2008 SF_{196}	—	September 25, 2008	Kitt Peak	Spacewatch	KOR	1.7 km	MPC · JPL
274525	2008 SY_{200}	—	September 26, 2008	Kitt Peak	Spacewatch	·	2.7 km	MPC · JPL
274526	2008 ST_{204}	—	September 26, 2008	Kitt Peak	Spacewatch	·	4.7 km	MPC · JPL
274527	2008 SK_{205}	—	September 26, 2008	Kitt Peak	Spacewatch	·	4.2 km	MPC · JPL
274528	2008 SH_{207}	—	September 26, 2008	Bergisch Gladbach	W. Bickel	·	2.2 km	MPC · JPL
274529	2008 SN_{213}	—	September 29, 2008	Kitt Peak	Spacewatch	·	2.8 km	MPC · JPL
274530	2008 SN_{217}	—	September 29, 2008	Kitt Peak	Spacewatch	·	3.9 km	MPC · JPL
274531	2008 SJ_{219}	—	September 30, 2008	La Sagra	OAM	·	2.4 km	MPC · JPL
274532	2008 SD_{220}	—	September 30, 2008	La Sagra	OAM	·	3.6 km	MPC · JPL
274533	2008 SJ_{228}	—	September 28, 2008	Mount Lemmon	Mount Lemmon Survey	EOS	2.6 km	MPC · JPL
274534	2008 SN_{229}	—	September 28, 2008	Mount Lemmon	Mount Lemmon Survey	·	4.7 km	MPC · JPL
274535	2008 SA_{236}	—	September 29, 2008	Dauban	Kugel, F.	·	1.9 km	MPC · JPL
274536	2008 SD_{236}	—	September 29, 2008	Kitt Peak	Spacewatch	·	2.6 km	MPC · JPL
274537	2008 SO_{236}	—	September 29, 2008	Kitt Peak	Spacewatch	·	2.4 km	MPC · JPL
274538	2008 SR_{236}	—	September 29, 2008	Kitt Peak	Spacewatch	·	2.6 km	MPC · JPL
274539	2008 SR_{237}	—	September 29, 2008	Catalina	CSS	KOR	1.7 km	MPC · JPL
274540	2008 SU_{239}	—	September 29, 2008	Kitt Peak	Spacewatch	·	3.1 km	MPC · JPL
274541	2008 SL_{246}	—	September 30, 2008	La Sagra	OAM	NAE	3.8 km	MPC · JPL
274542	2008 SN_{246}	—	September 30, 2008	La Sagra	OAM	·	2.6 km	MPC · JPL
274543	2008 SJ_{248}	—	September 20, 2008	Kitt Peak	Spacewatch	3:2 · SHU	6.0 km	MPC · JPL
274544	2008 SD_{249}	—	September 21, 2008	Catalina	CSS	·	3.3 km	MPC · JPL
274545	2008 SN_{249}	—	September 22, 2008	Kitt Peak	Spacewatch	·	1.6 km	MPC · JPL
274546	2008 SF_{250}	—	September 23, 2008	Mount Lemmon	Mount Lemmon Survey	CYB	4.6 km	MPC · JPL
274547	2008 SO_{250}	—	September 23, 2008	Kitt Peak	Spacewatch	EOS	2.8 km	MPC · JPL
274548	2008 SA_{255}	—	September 23, 2008	Mount Lemmon	Mount Lemmon Survey	EUN	1.6 km	MPC · JPL
274549	2008 SK_{255}	—	September 24, 2008	Mount Lemmon	Mount Lemmon Survey	·	4.6 km	MPC · JPL
274550	2008 SL_{255}	—	September 24, 2008	Mount Lemmon	Mount Lemmon Survey	·	2.7 km	MPC · JPL
274551	2008 ST_{256}	—	September 21, 2008	Mount Lemmon	Mount Lemmon Survey	·	5.2 km	MPC · JPL
274552	2008 SC_{257}	—	September 21, 2008	Siding Spring	SSS	BRA	2.4 km	MPC · JPL
274553	2008 SS_{257}	—	September 22, 2008	Kitt Peak	Spacewatch	·	1.3 km	MPC · JPL
274554	2008 SG_{265}	—	September 26, 2008	Kitt Peak	Spacewatch	·	5.9 km	MPC · JPL
274555	2008 SZ_{266}	—	September 22, 2008	Kitt Peak	Spacewatch	·	3.9 km	MPC · JPL
274556	2008 SL_{269}	—	September 22, 2008	Mount Lemmon	Mount Lemmon Survey	(1298)	3.3 km	MPC · JPL
274557	2008 SO_{269}	—	September 22, 2008	Mount Lemmon	Mount Lemmon Survey	·	1.5 km	MPC · JPL
274558	2008 SM_{270}	—	September 24, 2008	Kitt Peak	Spacewatch	·	3.3 km	MPC · JPL
274559	2008 SH_{272}	—	September 22, 2008	Mount Lemmon	Mount Lemmon Survey	SYL · CYB	6.2 km	MPC · JPL
274560	2008 SN_{273}	—	September 25, 2008	Mount Lemmon	Mount Lemmon Survey	DOR	2.8 km	MPC · JPL
274561	2008 SF_{276}	—	September 23, 2008	Mount Lemmon	Mount Lemmon Survey	KOR	1.7 km	MPC · JPL
274562	2008 SO_{278}	—	September 22, 2008	Mount Lemmon	Mount Lemmon Survey	L4	7.4 km	MPC · JPL
274563	2008 SU_{284}	—	September 24, 2008	Kitt Peak	Spacewatch	EOS	3.7 km	MPC · JPL
274564	2008 SG_{285}	—	September 19, 2008	Kitt Peak	Spacewatch	·	2.0 km	MPC · JPL
274565	2008 SS_{288}	—	September 24, 2008	Mount Lemmon	Mount Lemmon Survey	EOS	2.6 km	MPC · JPL
274566	2008 SR_{291}	—	September 24, 2008	Catalina	CSS	L4	12 km	MPC · JPL
274567	2008 SX_{291}	—	September 24, 2008	Catalina	CSS	DOR	3.4 km	MPC · JPL
274568	2008 SU_{292}	—	September 22, 2008	Catalina	CSS	URS	5.9 km	MPC · JPL
274569	2008 SE_{297}	—	September 28, 2008	Catalina	CSS	·	2.3 km	MPC · JPL
274570	2008 SE_{298}	—	September 20, 2008	Kitt Peak	Spacewatch	·	2.5 km	MPC · JPL
274571	2008 SZ_{298}	—	September 22, 2008	Socorro	LINEAR	NYS	1.2 km	MPC · JPL
274572	2008 SD_{299}	—	September 22, 2008	Socorro	LINEAR	·	3.4 km	MPC · JPL
274573	2008 SR_{302}	—	September 24, 2008	Socorro	LINEAR	WIT	1.2 km	MPC · JPL
274574	2008 SX_{303}	—	September 24, 2008	Kitt Peak	Spacewatch	EOS	2.2 km	MPC · JPL
274575	2008 SD_{304}	—	September 24, 2008	Mount Lemmon	Mount Lemmon Survey	PAD	3.1 km	MPC · JPL
274576	2008 SU_{306}	—	September 29, 2008	Mount Lemmon	Mount Lemmon Survey	HNS	1.6 km	MPC · JPL
274577	2008 SJ_{307}	—	September 29, 2008	Socorro	LINEAR	EOS	3.1 km	MPC · JPL
274578	2008 SN_{308}	—	September 30, 2008	Socorro	LINEAR	·	3.5 km	MPC · JPL
274579	2008 SB_{309}	—	September 22, 2008	Socorro	LINEAR	·	2.1 km	MPC · JPL
274580	2008 TU	—	October 1, 2008	Hibiscus	S. F. Hönig, Teamo, N.	EOS	2.5 km	MPC · JPL
274581	2008 TZ_{4}	—	October 1, 2008	La Sagra	OAM	MIS	2.9 km	MPC · JPL
274582	2008 TC_{6}	—	October 3, 2008	La Sagra	OAM	·	2.3 km	MPC · JPL
274583	2008 TF_{7}	—	October 3, 2008	La Sagra	OAM	·	5.0 km	MPC · JPL
274584	2008 TN_{7}	—	October 3, 2008	La Sagra	OAM	·	2.9 km	MPC · JPL
274585	2008 TQ_{7}	—	October 3, 2008	La Sagra	OAM	·	2.4 km	MPC · JPL
274586	2008 TW_{7}	—	October 4, 2008	La Sagra	OAM	PAD	3.5 km	MPC · JPL
274587	2008 TC_{8}	—	October 4, 2008	La Sagra	OAM	·	3.4 km	MPC · JPL
274588	2008 TY_{10}	—	October 9, 2008	Catalina	CSS	·	6.4 km	MPC · JPL
274589	2008 TX_{11}	—	October 1, 2008	Mount Lemmon	Mount Lemmon Survey	KOR	1.5 km	MPC · JPL
274590	2008 TN_{18}	—	October 1, 2008	Mount Lemmon	Mount Lemmon Survey	·	1.2 km	MPC · JPL
274591	2008 TE_{26}	—	October 9, 2008	Kachina	Hobart, J.	·	4.7 km	MPC · JPL
274592	2008 TR_{27}	—	October 1, 2008	La Sagra	OAM	·	2.4 km	MPC · JPL
274593	2008 TU_{28}	—	October 1, 2008	Catalina	CSS	·	3.2 km	MPC · JPL
274594	2008 TF_{29}	—	October 1, 2008	Mount Lemmon	Mount Lemmon Survey	KOR	1.6 km	MPC · JPL
274595	2008 TV_{29}	—	October 1, 2008	Mount Lemmon	Mount Lemmon Survey	KOR	1.7 km	MPC · JPL
274596	2008 TY_{29}	—	October 1, 2008	Mount Lemmon	Mount Lemmon Survey	·	3.2 km	MPC · JPL
274597	2008 TO_{30}	—	October 1, 2008	Kitt Peak	Spacewatch	KOR	1.5 km	MPC · JPL
274598	2008 TE_{33}	—	April 16, 2001	Kitt Peak	Spacewatch	·	2.3 km	MPC · JPL
274599	2008 TR_{34}	—	October 1, 2008	Mount Lemmon	Mount Lemmon Survey	CYB	3.3 km	MPC · JPL
274600	2008 TF_{35}	—	October 1, 2008	Mount Lemmon	Mount Lemmon Survey	·	2.1 km	MPC · JPL

== 274601–274700 ==
back to top

Designation			Discovery			Properties		Ref
Permanent	Provisional	Named after	Date	Site	Discoverer(s)	Category	Diam.	Ref
274601	2008 TV_{36}	—	October 1, 2008	Catalina	CSS	·	2.1 km	MPC · JPL
274602	2008 TS_{37}	—	October 1, 2008	Mount Lemmon	Mount Lemmon Survey	CYB	3.8 km	MPC · JPL
274603	2008 TD_{43}	—	October 1, 2008	Mount Lemmon	Mount Lemmon Survey	·	4.5 km	MPC · JPL
274604	2008 TV_{45}	—	October 1, 2008	Kitt Peak	Spacewatch	·	4.7 km	MPC · JPL
274605	2008 TG_{47}	—	October 1, 2008	Kitt Peak	Spacewatch	·	3.3 km	MPC · JPL
274606	2008 TO_{48}	—	October 2, 2008	Kitt Peak	Spacewatch	NYS	1.2 km	MPC · JPL
274607	2008 TD_{49}	—	October 2, 2008	Kitt Peak	Spacewatch	·	3.7 km	MPC · JPL
274608	2008 TO_{54}	—	October 2, 2008	Kitt Peak	Spacewatch	EOS	2.9 km	MPC · JPL
274609	2008 TE_{55}	—	October 2, 2008	Kitt Peak	Spacewatch	HYG	3.2 km	MPC · JPL
274610	2008 TS_{56}	—	October 2, 2008	Kitt Peak	Spacewatch	KOR	1.9 km	MPC · JPL
274611	2008 TM_{57}	—	October 2, 2008	Kitt Peak	Spacewatch	KOR	1.5 km	MPC · JPL
274612	2008 TH_{58}	—	October 2, 2008	Kitt Peak	Spacewatch	·	2.4 km	MPC · JPL
274613	2008 TJ_{59}	—	October 2, 2008	Kitt Peak	Spacewatch	EOS	2.5 km	MPC · JPL
274614	2008 TK_{59}	—	October 2, 2008	Kitt Peak	Spacewatch	NEM	2.3 km	MPC · JPL
274615	2008 TM_{59}	—	October 2, 2008	Kitt Peak	Spacewatch	·	1.5 km	MPC · JPL
274616	2008 TN_{60}	—	October 2, 2008	Mount Lemmon	Mount Lemmon Survey	·	4.5 km	MPC · JPL
274617	2008 TN_{62}	—	October 2, 2008	Kitt Peak	Spacewatch	·	6.3 km	MPC · JPL
274618	2008 TJ_{63}	—	October 2, 2008	Kitt Peak	Spacewatch	·	2.9 km	MPC · JPL
274619	2008 TQ_{63}	—	October 2, 2008	Kitt Peak	Spacewatch	·	2.2 km	MPC · JPL
274620	2008 TN_{66}	—	October 2, 2008	Kitt Peak	Spacewatch	·	3.5 km	MPC · JPL
274621	2008 TH_{68}	—	October 2, 2008	Kitt Peak	Spacewatch	·	4.5 km	MPC · JPL
274622	2008 TJ_{72}	—	October 2, 2008	Mount Lemmon	Mount Lemmon Survey	(5)	1.6 km	MPC · JPL
274623	2008 TG_{74}	—	October 2, 2008	Kitt Peak	Spacewatch	·	2.3 km	MPC · JPL
274624	2008 TP_{74}	—	October 2, 2008	Kitt Peak	Spacewatch	EOS	3.0 km	MPC · JPL
274625	2008 TP_{75}	—	October 2, 2008	Kitt Peak	Spacewatch	·	5.4 km	MPC · JPL
274626	2008 TD_{77}	—	October 2, 2008	Mount Lemmon	Mount Lemmon Survey	KOR	1.6 km	MPC · JPL
274627	2008 TE_{82}	—	October 2, 2008	Mount Lemmon	Mount Lemmon Survey	·	2.3 km	MPC · JPL
274628	2008 TP_{82}	—	October 3, 2008	La Sagra	OAM	·	3.1 km	MPC · JPL
274629	2008 TL_{84}	—	October 3, 2008	Kitt Peak	Spacewatch	·	2.6 km	MPC · JPL
274630	2008 TE_{86}	—	October 3, 2008	Mount Lemmon	Mount Lemmon Survey	·	2.1 km	MPC · JPL
274631	2008 TV_{86}	—	October 3, 2008	Kitt Peak	Spacewatch	·	3.9 km	MPC · JPL
274632	2008 TO_{87}	—	October 3, 2008	Kitt Peak	Spacewatch	·	2.7 km	MPC · JPL
274633	2008 TF_{88}	—	October 3, 2008	Kitt Peak	Spacewatch	·	3.0 km	MPC · JPL
274634	2008 TM_{88}	—	October 3, 2008	Kitt Peak	Spacewatch	L4	10 km	MPC · JPL
274635	2008 TU_{93}	—	October 5, 2008	La Sagra	OAM	(21885)	3.8 km	MPC · JPL
274636	2008 TA_{101}	—	October 6, 2008	Kitt Peak	Spacewatch	KOR	1.4 km	MPC · JPL
274637	2008 TZ_{106}	—	October 6, 2008	Mount Lemmon	Mount Lemmon Survey	·	3.1 km	MPC · JPL
274638	2008 TN_{111}	—	October 6, 2008	Catalina	CSS	·	3.9 km	MPC · JPL
274639	2008 TQ_{111}	—	October 6, 2008	Catalina	CSS	(5)	1.8 km	MPC · JPL
274640	2008 TY_{112}	—	October 6, 2008	Kitt Peak	Spacewatch	·	2.4 km	MPC · JPL
274641	2008 TD_{116}	—	October 6, 2008	Catalina	CSS	PHO	1.6 km	MPC · JPL
274642	2008 TD_{118}	—	October 6, 2008	Kitt Peak	Spacewatch	KOR	1.8 km	MPC · JPL
274643	2008 TT_{120}	—	October 7, 2008	Mount Lemmon	Mount Lemmon Survey	·	1.9 km	MPC · JPL
274644	2008 TC_{125}	—	October 8, 2008	Mount Lemmon	Mount Lemmon Survey	·	1.9 km	MPC · JPL
274645	2008 TQ_{130}	—	October 8, 2008	Mount Lemmon	Mount Lemmon Survey	·	3.3 km	MPC · JPL
274646	2008 TK_{133}	—	October 8, 2008	Mount Lemmon	Mount Lemmon Survey	·	3.7 km	MPC · JPL
274647	2008 TN_{135}	—	October 8, 2008	Kitt Peak	Spacewatch	·	4.8 km	MPC · JPL
274648	2008 TK_{140}	—	October 9, 2008	Kitt Peak	Spacewatch	·	4.1 km	MPC · JPL
274649	2008 TR_{141}	—	October 9, 2008	Mount Lemmon	Mount Lemmon Survey	·	4.4 km	MPC · JPL
274650	2008 TU_{142}	—	October 9, 2008	Mount Lemmon	Mount Lemmon Survey	·	4.5 km	MPC · JPL
274651	2008 TF_{149}	—	October 9, 2008	Mount Lemmon	Mount Lemmon Survey	L4	11 km	MPC · JPL
274652	2008 TB_{151}	—	October 9, 2008	Mount Lemmon	Mount Lemmon Survey	·	2.1 km	MPC · JPL
274653	2008 TH_{151}	—	October 9, 2008	Mount Lemmon	Mount Lemmon Survey	·	2.3 km	MPC · JPL
274654	2008 TJ_{151}	—	October 9, 2008	Mount Lemmon	Mount Lemmon Survey	·	2.2 km	MPC · JPL
274655	2008 TL_{151}	—	October 9, 2008	Mount Lemmon	Mount Lemmon Survey	KOR	1.9 km	MPC · JPL
274656	2008 TO_{151}	—	October 9, 2008	Mount Lemmon	Mount Lemmon Survey	·	1.9 km	MPC · JPL
274657	2008 TK_{152}	—	October 9, 2008	Mount Lemmon	Mount Lemmon Survey	·	3.3 km	MPC · JPL
274658	2008 TY_{156}	—	October 2, 2008	Kitt Peak	Spacewatch	3:2	6.1 km	MPC · JPL
274659	2008 TV_{157}	—	October 4, 2008	Catalina	CSS	·	4.3 km	MPC · JPL
274660	2008 TL_{165}	—	October 2, 2008	Mount Lemmon	Mount Lemmon Survey	EOS	2.4 km	MPC · JPL
274661	2008 TT_{168}	—	October 3, 2008	Mount Lemmon	Mount Lemmon Survey	·	3.5 km	MPC · JPL
274662	2008 TU_{168}	—	October 3, 2008	Mount Lemmon	Mount Lemmon Survey	EOS	2.5 km	MPC · JPL
274663	2008 TY_{170}	—	October 9, 2008	Mount Lemmon	Mount Lemmon Survey	·	4.7 km	MPC · JPL
274664	2008 TC_{171}	—	October 9, 2008	Catalina	CSS	·	2.9 km	MPC · JPL
274665	2008 TA_{172}	—	October 8, 2008	Catalina	CSS	EOS	2.7 km	MPC · JPL
274666	2008 TG_{174}	—	October 2, 2008	Kitt Peak	Spacewatch	L4	8.6 km	MPC · JPL
274667	2008 TP_{175}	—	October 9, 2008	Kitt Peak	Spacewatch	·	2.8 km	MPC · JPL
274668	2008 TG_{177}	—	October 1, 2008	Catalina	CSS	·	3.7 km	MPC · JPL
274669	2008 TH_{177}	—	October 1, 2008	Catalina	CSS	·	6.0 km	MPC · JPL
274670	2008 TL_{177}	—	October 9, 2008	Catalina	CSS	·	5.7 km	MPC · JPL
274671	2008 TG_{182}	—	October 1, 2008	Catalina	CSS	·	2.5 km	MPC · JPL
274672	2008 TX_{185}	—	October 7, 2008	Kitt Peak	Spacewatch	EOS	2.4 km	MPC · JPL
274673	2008 TA_{186}	—	October 7, 2008	Goodricke-Pigott	R. A. Tucker	·	2.8 km	MPC · JPL
274674	2008 TR_{187}	—	October 8, 2008	Catalina	CSS	·	1.7 km	MPC · JPL
274675	2008 UZ_{7}	—	October 17, 2008	Kitt Peak	Spacewatch	L4 · (222861)	12 km	MPC · JPL
274676	2008 UA_{8}	—	October 17, 2008	Kitt Peak	Spacewatch	·	2.2 km	MPC · JPL
274677	2008 UP_{8}	—	October 17, 2008	Kitt Peak	Spacewatch	EOS	2.1 km	MPC · JPL
274678	2008 UD_{11}	—	October 17, 2008	Kitt Peak	Spacewatch	·	1.6 km	MPC · JPL
274679	2008 UO_{11}	—	October 17, 2008	Kitt Peak	Spacewatch	T_{j} (2.99) · 3:2	4.7 km	MPC · JPL
274680	2008 UL_{12}	—	October 17, 2008	Kitt Peak	Spacewatch	L4	7.5 km	MPC · JPL
274681	2008 UD_{14}	—	October 17, 2008	Kitt Peak	Spacewatch	·	4.7 km	MPC · JPL
274682	2008 US_{14}	—	October 18, 2008	Kitt Peak	Spacewatch	·	2.2 km	MPC · JPL
274683	2008 UA_{20}	—	October 19, 2008	Kitt Peak	Spacewatch	·	4.2 km	MPC · JPL
274684	2008 UX_{24}	—	October 20, 2008	Mount Lemmon	Mount Lemmon Survey	·	2.3 km	MPC · JPL
274685	2008 UZ_{28}	—	October 20, 2008	Kitt Peak	Spacewatch	VER	3.4 km	MPC · JPL
274686	2008 UZ_{29}	—	October 20, 2008	Kitt Peak	Spacewatch	EOS	2.0 km	MPC · JPL
274687	2008 UG_{32}	—	October 20, 2008	Kitt Peak	Spacewatch	HYG	2.8 km	MPC · JPL
274688	2008 UB_{45}	—	October 20, 2008	Mount Lemmon	Mount Lemmon Survey	HYG	3.7 km	MPC · JPL
274689	2008 UH_{48}	—	October 20, 2008	Mount Lemmon	Mount Lemmon Survey	·	2.0 km	MPC · JPL
274690	2008 UV_{48}	—	October 20, 2008	Kitt Peak	Spacewatch	·	4.7 km	MPC · JPL
274691	2008 UA_{50}	—	October 20, 2008	Mount Lemmon	Mount Lemmon Survey	AGN	1.3 km	MPC · JPL
274692	2008 UB_{50}	—	October 20, 2008	Mount Lemmon	Mount Lemmon Survey	·	4.8 km	MPC · JPL
274693	2008 UD_{52}	—	October 20, 2008	Mount Lemmon	Mount Lemmon Survey	·	6.7 km	MPC · JPL
274694	2008 UZ_{52}	—	October 20, 2008	Mount Lemmon	Mount Lemmon Survey	·	2.8 km	MPC · JPL
274695	2008 UA_{56}	—	October 21, 2008	Kitt Peak	Spacewatch	·	2.6 km	MPC · JPL
274696	2008 UG_{56}	—	October 21, 2008	Kitt Peak	Spacewatch	·	3.3 km	MPC · JPL
274697	2008 US_{59}	—	October 21, 2008	Mount Lemmon	Mount Lemmon Survey	·	4.2 km	MPC · JPL
274698	2008 UV_{59}	—	October 21, 2008	Kitt Peak	Spacewatch	EOS	2.7 km	MPC · JPL
274699	2008 UZ_{61}	—	October 21, 2008	Kitt Peak	Spacewatch	·	3.4 km	MPC · JPL
274700	2008 UD_{76}	—	October 21, 2008	Kitt Peak	Spacewatch	EOS	2.6 km	MPC · JPL

== 274701–274800 ==
back to top

Designation			Discovery			Properties		Ref
Permanent	Provisional	Named after	Date	Site	Discoverer(s)	Category	Diam.	Ref
274701	2008 UO_{79}	—	October 22, 2008	Kitt Peak	Spacewatch	EOS	2.6 km	MPC · JPL
274702	2008 UM_{83}	—	October 22, 2008	Mount Lemmon	Mount Lemmon Survey	MRX	1.6 km	MPC · JPL
274703	2008 UC_{84}	—	October 23, 2008	Kitt Peak	Spacewatch	·	1.9 km	MPC · JPL
274704	2008 UH_{87}	—	October 23, 2008	Kitt Peak	Spacewatch	·	4.4 km	MPC · JPL
274705	2008 UH_{91}	—	October 27, 2008	Hibiscus	Pelle, J. C.	PAD	2.3 km	MPC · JPL
274706	2008 UB_{96}	—	October 24, 2008	Socorro	LINEAR	·	4.0 km	MPC · JPL
274707	2008 UG_{100}	—	October 27, 2008	Bisei SG Center	BATTeRS	·	3.1 km	MPC · JPL
274708	2008 UG_{101}	—	October 20, 2008	Kitt Peak	Spacewatch	·	3.5 km	MPC · JPL
274709	2008 UW_{101}	—	October 20, 2008	Kitt Peak	Spacewatch	·	1.5 km	MPC · JPL
274710	2008 UE_{107}	—	October 21, 2008	Kitt Peak	Spacewatch	·	4.1 km	MPC · JPL
274711	2008 UH_{107}	—	October 21, 2008	Kitt Peak	Spacewatch	·	4.1 km	MPC · JPL
274712	2008 UB_{112}	—	October 22, 2008	Kitt Peak	Spacewatch	EOS	2.7 km	MPC · JPL
274713	2008 UO_{116}	—	October 22, 2008	Kitt Peak	Spacewatch	·	4.3 km	MPC · JPL
274714	2008 UZ_{125}	—	October 22, 2008	Kitt Peak	Spacewatch	EOS	2.2 km	MPC · JPL
274715	2008 UQ_{129}	—	October 23, 2008	Kitt Peak	Spacewatch	·	4.2 km	MPC · JPL
274716	2008 UD_{138}	—	October 23, 2008	Kitt Peak	Spacewatch	·	2.9 km	MPC · JPL
274717	2008 UD_{140}	—	October 23, 2008	Kitt Peak	Spacewatch	·	3.7 km	MPC · JPL
274718	2008 UF_{142}	—	October 23, 2008	Kitt Peak	Spacewatch	·	2.2 km	MPC · JPL
274719	2008 UN_{142}	—	October 23, 2008	Kitt Peak	Spacewatch	·	3.0 km	MPC · JPL
274720	2008 UJ_{145}	—	October 23, 2008	Kitt Peak	Spacewatch	·	3.9 km	MPC · JPL
274721	2008 UH_{155}	—	October 23, 2008	Mount Lemmon	Mount Lemmon Survey	·	3.1 km	MPC · JPL
274722	2008 UC_{163}	—	October 24, 2008	Kitt Peak	Spacewatch	·	2.9 km	MPC · JPL
274723	2008 UN_{168}	—	October 24, 2008	Kitt Peak	Spacewatch	HYG	3.9 km	MPC · JPL
274724	2008 UG_{173}	—	October 24, 2008	Kitt Peak	Spacewatch	·	4.0 km	MPC · JPL
274725	2008 US_{173}	—	October 24, 2008	Catalina	CSS	·	5.0 km	MPC · JPL
274726	2008 UG_{174}	—	October 24, 2008	Kitt Peak	Spacewatch	·	1.7 km	MPC · JPL
274727	2008 UW_{182}	—	October 24, 2008	Mount Lemmon	Mount Lemmon Survey	KOR	2.0 km	MPC · JPL
274728	2008 UQ_{183}	—	October 24, 2008	Mount Lemmon	Mount Lemmon Survey	·	3.3 km	MPC · JPL
274729	2008 UK_{188}	—	October 24, 2008	Kitt Peak	Spacewatch	·	2.9 km	MPC · JPL
274730	2008 UE_{189}	—	October 25, 2008	Mount Lemmon	Mount Lemmon Survey	KOR	1.5 km	MPC · JPL
274731	2008 US_{189}	—	October 25, 2008	Mount Lemmon	Mount Lemmon Survey	·	1.8 km	MPC · JPL
274732	2008 UG_{191}	—	October 25, 2008	Mount Lemmon	Mount Lemmon Survey	·	3.4 km	MPC · JPL
274733	2008 UP_{193}	—	October 25, 2008	Mount Lemmon	Mount Lemmon Survey	·	3.8 km	MPC · JPL
274734	2008 UZ_{195}	—	October 26, 2008	Siding Spring	SSS	·	4.7 km	MPC · JPL
274735	2008 UF_{201}	—	October 28, 2008	Socorro	LINEAR	NAE	5.3 km	MPC · JPL
274736	2008 UZ_{203}	—	October 28, 2008	Socorro	LINEAR	EOS	3.3 km	MPC · JPL
274737	2008 UB_{205}	—	October 24, 2008	Siding Spring	SSS	·	7.8 km	MPC · JPL
274738	2008 UJ_{206}	—	October 22, 2008	Mount Lemmon	Mount Lemmon Survey	·	4.3 km	MPC · JPL
274739	2008 UB_{207}	—	October 23, 2008	Kitt Peak	Spacewatch	·	2.3 km	MPC · JPL
274740	2008 UH_{211}	—	October 23, 2008	Kitt Peak	Spacewatch	·	1.9 km	MPC · JPL
274741	2008 UN_{218}	—	October 25, 2008	Kitt Peak	Spacewatch	·	3.4 km	MPC · JPL
274742	2008 UT_{218}	—	October 25, 2008	Kitt Peak	Spacewatch	EOS	2.0 km	MPC · JPL
274743	2008 UN_{221}	—	October 25, 2008	Kitt Peak	Spacewatch	·	3.6 km	MPC · JPL
274744	2008 UU_{233}	—	October 26, 2008	Mount Lemmon	Mount Lemmon Survey	·	3.6 km	MPC · JPL
274745	2008 UB_{249}	—	October 27, 2008	Kitt Peak	Spacewatch	·	1.5 km	MPC · JPL
274746	2008 UF_{265}	—	October 28, 2008	Kitt Peak	Spacewatch	HYG	3.0 km	MPC · JPL
274747	2008 UK_{267}	—	October 28, 2008	Mount Lemmon	Mount Lemmon Survey	·	910 m	MPC · JPL
274748	2008 UV_{268}	—	October 28, 2008	Kitt Peak	Spacewatch	·	3.1 km	MPC · JPL
274749	2008 UO_{270}	—	October 28, 2008	Catalina	CSS	(895)	5.3 km	MPC · JPL
274750	2008 UT_{273}	—	October 28, 2008	Kitt Peak	Spacewatch	3:2	5.3 km	MPC · JPL
274751	2008 UT_{275}	—	October 28, 2008	Mount Lemmon	Mount Lemmon Survey	·	4.5 km	MPC · JPL
274752	2008 UX_{275}	—	October 28, 2008	Mount Lemmon	Mount Lemmon Survey	VER	4.7 km	MPC · JPL
274753	2008 UD_{277}	—	October 28, 2008	Mount Lemmon	Mount Lemmon Survey	CYB	6.8 km	MPC · JPL
274754	2008 UC_{278}	—	October 28, 2008	Mount Lemmon	Mount Lemmon Survey	(31811)	3.9 km	MPC · JPL
274755	2008 UK_{278}	—	October 28, 2008	Mount Lemmon	Mount Lemmon Survey	·	3.6 km	MPC · JPL
274756	2008 UH_{279}	—	October 28, 2008	Mount Lemmon	Mount Lemmon Survey	·	2.0 km	MPC · JPL
274757	2008 UG_{281}	—	October 28, 2008	Mount Lemmon	Mount Lemmon Survey	·	3.3 km	MPC · JPL
274758	2008 UV_{285}	—	October 28, 2008	Mount Lemmon	Mount Lemmon Survey	KOR	1.9 km	MPC · JPL
274759	2008 UH_{288}	—	October 28, 2008	Mount Lemmon	Mount Lemmon Survey	·	2.9 km	MPC · JPL
274760	2008 UN_{290}	—	October 28, 2008	Kitt Peak	Spacewatch	·	2.0 km	MPC · JPL
274761	2008 UN_{296}	—	October 29, 2008	Kitt Peak	Spacewatch	·	3.7 km	MPC · JPL
274762	2008 UG_{301}	—	October 29, 2008	Mount Lemmon	Mount Lemmon Survey	·	4.1 km	MPC · JPL
274763	2008 UR_{302}	—	October 29, 2008	Kitt Peak	Spacewatch	3:2	5.7 km	MPC · JPL
274764	2008 UT_{306}	—	October 30, 2008	Catalina	CSS	·	2.6 km	MPC · JPL
274765	2008 US_{319}	—	October 31, 2008	Mount Lemmon	Mount Lemmon Survey	EOS	5.1 km	MPC · JPL
274766	2008 UU_{329}	—	October 31, 2008	Kitt Peak	Spacewatch	·	4.0 km	MPC · JPL
274767	2008 UW_{330}	—	October 31, 2008	Kitt Peak	Spacewatch	HYG	3.9 km	MPC · JPL
274768	2008 US_{336}	—	October 23, 2008	Kitt Peak	Spacewatch	·	3.9 km	MPC · JPL
274769	2008 UX_{340}	—	October 24, 2008	Catalina	CSS	·	5.3 km	MPC · JPL
274770	2008 US_{343}	—	October 23, 2008	Kitt Peak	Spacewatch	·	3.3 km	MPC · JPL
274771	2008 UR_{345}	—	October 27, 2008	Mount Lemmon	Mount Lemmon Survey	·	3.6 km	MPC · JPL
274772	2008 UW_{346}	—	October 21, 2008	Mount Lemmon	Mount Lemmon Survey	·	2.5 km	MPC · JPL
274773	2008 UV_{348}	—	October 26, 2008	Kitt Peak	Spacewatch	L4	6.5 km	MPC · JPL
274774	2008 UB_{361}	—	October 25, 2008	Catalina	CSS	EUN	1.5 km	MPC · JPL
274775	2008 UH_{361}	—	October 26, 2008	Siding Spring	SSS	EUN	2.0 km	MPC · JPL
274776	2008 UC_{363}	—	October 26, 2008	Catalina	CSS	·	3.5 km	MPC · JPL
274777	2008 VA_{3}	—	November 3, 2008	Socorro	LINEAR	·	7.3 km	MPC · JPL
274778	2008 VE_{3}	—	November 3, 2008	Socorro	LINEAR	·	4.2 km	MPC · JPL
274779	2008 VY_{5}	—	November 1, 2008	Mount Lemmon	Mount Lemmon Survey	·	4.7 km	MPC · JPL
274780	2008 VQ_{23}	—	November 1, 2008	Kitt Peak	Spacewatch	·	5.0 km	MPC · JPL
274781	2008 VS_{27}	—	November 2, 2008	Kitt Peak	Spacewatch	HYG	4.5 km	MPC · JPL
274782	2008 VS_{50}	—	November 4, 2008	Catalina	CSS	·	1.9 km	MPC · JPL
274783	2008 VK_{57}	—	November 6, 2008	Mount Lemmon	Mount Lemmon Survey	EOS	2.8 km	MPC · JPL
274784	2008 VR_{57}	—	November 6, 2008	Mount Lemmon	Mount Lemmon Survey	·	1.9 km	MPC · JPL
274785	2008 VC_{59}	—	November 7, 2008	Mount Lemmon	Mount Lemmon Survey	·	5.8 km	MPC · JPL
274786	2008 VT_{75}	—	November 2, 2008	Catalina	CSS	·	3.7 km	MPC · JPL
274787	2008 WS	—	November 17, 2008	Kitt Peak	Spacewatch	EOS	1.9 km	MPC · JPL
274788	2008 WD_{2}	—	November 18, 2008	Socorro	LINEAR	·	4.8 km	MPC · JPL
274789	2008 WN_{9}	—	November 17, 2008	Kitt Peak	Spacewatch	AGN	1.4 km	MPC · JPL
274790	2008 WS_{12}	—	November 17, 2008	Catalina	CSS	·	5.5 km	MPC · JPL
274791	2008 WJ_{15}	—	November 17, 2008	Kitt Peak	Spacewatch	·	3.6 km	MPC · JPL
274792	2008 WF_{19}	—	November 17, 2008	Kitt Peak	Spacewatch	·	2.6 km	MPC · JPL
274793	2008 WG_{38}	—	November 17, 2008	Kitt Peak	Spacewatch	·	1.8 km	MPC · JPL
274794	2008 WR_{49}	—	November 18, 2008	Catalina	CSS	·	4.2 km	MPC · JPL
274795	2008 WZ_{51}	—	November 19, 2008	Kitt Peak	Spacewatch	·	4.5 km	MPC · JPL
274796	2008 WB_{58}	—	November 20, 2008	Mount Lemmon	Mount Lemmon Survey	VER	4.6 km	MPC · JPL
274797	2008 WW_{63}	—	November 24, 2008	Calvin-Rehoboth	L. A. Molnar	·	3.6 km	MPC · JPL
274798	2008 WJ_{66}	—	November 18, 2008	Catalina	CSS	·	3.6 km	MPC · JPL
274799	2008 WO_{71}	—	January 31, 2006	Kitt Peak	Spacewatch	·	2.7 km	MPC · JPL
274800	2008 WP_{71}	—	October 9, 1999	Kitt Peak	Spacewatch	·	2.0 km	MPC · JPL

== 274801–274900 ==
back to top

Designation			Discovery			Properties		Ref
Permanent	Provisional	Named after	Date	Site	Discoverer(s)	Category	Diam.	Ref
274801	2008 WR_{99}	—	November 24, 2008	Mount Lemmon	Mount Lemmon Survey	·	1.8 km	MPC · JPL
274802	2008 WS_{101}	—	November 30, 2008	Socorro	LINEAR	·	3.1 km	MPC · JPL
274803	2008 WT_{113}	—	November 30, 2008	Kitt Peak	Spacewatch	CYB	4.0 km	MPC · JPL
274804	2008 WV_{127}	—	November 20, 2008	Bisei SG Center	BATTeRS	·	5.3 km	MPC · JPL
274805	2008 WE_{129}	—	November 18, 2008	Kitt Peak	Spacewatch	·	3.9 km	MPC · JPL
274806	2008 XR_{7}	—	December 1, 2008	Kitt Peak	Spacewatch	·	2.9 km	MPC · JPL
274807	2008 XU_{13}	—	December 3, 2008	Mount Lemmon	Mount Lemmon Survey	·	7.6 km	MPC · JPL
274808	2008 XC_{31}	—	December 2, 2008	Kitt Peak	Spacewatch	·	3.7 km	MPC · JPL
274809	2008 XQ_{32}	—	December 2, 2008	Kitt Peak	Spacewatch	·	3.1 km	MPC · JPL
274810 Fedáksári	2008 YP_{25}	Fedáksári	December 27, 2008	Piszkéstető	K. Sárneczky	3:2 · SHU	3.9 km	MPC · JPL
274811	2008 YH_{126}	—	December 30, 2008	Kitt Peak	Spacewatch	HIL · 3:2	7.0 km	MPC · JPL
274812	2009 BP_{6}	—	January 18, 2009	Socorro	LINEAR	ADE	3.5 km	MPC · JPL
274813	2009 BM_{42}	—	January 16, 2009	Kitt Peak	Spacewatch	THM	3.3 km	MPC · JPL
274814	2009 JB_{16}	—	May 14, 2009	Kitt Peak	Spacewatch	·	2.2 km	MPC · JPL
274815	2009 KS_{8}	—	May 25, 2009	Hibiscus	Teamo, N.	·	1.8 km	MPC · JPL
274816	2009 KR_{18}	—	May 27, 2009	Mount Lemmon	Mount Lemmon Survey	·	2.2 km	MPC · JPL
274817	2009 NC_{1}	—	July 15, 2009	La Sagra	OAM	·	2.1 km	MPC · JPL
274818	2009 NX_{1}	—	July 12, 2009	Kitt Peak	Spacewatch	MAS	860 m	MPC · JPL
274819	2009 OR	—	January 16, 1997	Kitt Peak	Spacewatch	H	620 m	MPC · JPL
274820	2009 OQ_{2}	—	July 19, 2009	La Sagra	OAM	·	2.0 km	MPC · JPL
274821	2009 OW_{2}	—	July 21, 2009	Plana	Fratev, F.	MAS	960 m	MPC · JPL
274822	2009 OJ_{8}	—	July 28, 2009	Tiki	Teamo, N.	·	820 m	MPC · JPL
274823	2009 OY_{19}	—	July 30, 2009	Skylive	Tozzi, F.	·	1.6 km	MPC · JPL
274824	2009 PV_{1}	—	August 14, 2009	Marly	P. Kocher	·	790 m	MPC · JPL
274825	2009 PY_{8}	—	August 15, 2009	Catalina	CSS	·	870 m	MPC · JPL
274826	2009 PX_{10}	—	August 15, 2009	Socorro	LINEAR	NYS	1.5 km	MPC · JPL
274827	2009 PR_{11}	—	August 15, 2009	Kitt Peak	Spacewatch	·	1.5 km	MPC · JPL
274828	2009 PD_{12}	—	August 15, 2009	Catalina	CSS	·	1.4 km	MPC · JPL
274829	2009 PT_{14}	—	August 15, 2009	Kitt Peak	Spacewatch	·	1.1 km	MPC · JPL
274830	2009 PK_{18}	—	August 15, 2009	Kitt Peak	Spacewatch	·	930 m	MPC · JPL
274831	2009 PO_{18}	—	August 15, 2009	Kitt Peak	Spacewatch	·	910 m	MPC · JPL
274832	2009 QN_{1}	—	August 16, 2009	La Sagra	OAM	·	1.9 km	MPC · JPL
274833	2009 QQ_{1}	—	August 16, 2009	Skylive	Tozzi, F.	·	1.3 km	MPC · JPL
274834	2009 QR_{9}	—	August 20, 2009	Socorro	LINEAR	·	2.7 km	MPC · JPL
274835 Aachen	2009 QC_{11}	Aachen	August 22, 2009	Tzec Maun	E. Schwab	·	1.5 km	MPC · JPL
274836	2009 QT_{14}	—	August 16, 2009	Kitt Peak	Spacewatch	·	1.2 km	MPC · JPL
274837	2009 QR_{16}	—	August 16, 2009	Kitt Peak	Spacewatch	·	740 m	MPC · JPL
274838	2009 QL_{21}	—	August 19, 2009	La Sagra	OAM	·	1.6 km	MPC · JPL
274839	2009 QD_{22}	—	August 20, 2009	La Sagra	OAM	·	1.9 km	MPC · JPL
274840	2009 QO_{23}	—	August 16, 2009	La Sagra	OAM	·	1.1 km	MPC · JPL
274841	2009 QQ_{23}	—	August 16, 2009	La Sagra	OAM	NYS	1.8 km	MPC · JPL
274842	2009 QB_{28}	—	August 19, 2009	Kitt Peak	Spacewatch	EUN	1.5 km	MPC · JPL
274843 Mykhailopetrenko	2009 QF_{30}	Mykhailopetrenko	August 24, 2009	Andrushivka	Andrushivka	·	910 m	MPC · JPL
274844	2009 QW_{32}	—	August 27, 2009	Catalina	CSS	H	620 m	MPC · JPL
274845	2009 QB_{38}	—	August 31, 2009	Bergisch Gladbach	W. Bickel	·	3.3 km	MPC · JPL
274846	2009 QO_{38}	—	August 30, 2009	Taunus	Karge, S., R. Kling	·	980 m	MPC · JPL
274847	2009 QW_{38}	—	August 29, 2009	Taunus	Karge, S., R. Kling	EOS	2.7 km	MPC · JPL
274848	2009 QL_{41}	—	August 20, 2009	Kitt Peak	Spacewatch	NYS	1.2 km	MPC · JPL
274849	2009 QO_{41}	—	August 20, 2009	La Sagra	OAM	·	810 m	MPC · JPL
274850	2009 QF_{48}	—	August 28, 2009	La Sagra	OAM	·	1.7 km	MPC · JPL
274851	2009 QH_{48}	—	August 26, 2009	Catalina	CSS	·	920 m	MPC · JPL
274852	2009 QB_{50}	—	August 28, 2009	Kitt Peak	Spacewatch	·	840 m	MPC · JPL
274853	2009 QH_{62}	—	August 29, 2009	La Sagra	OAM	·	930 m	MPC · JPL
274854	2009 QL_{63}	—	August 17, 2009	Catalina	CSS	·	970 m	MPC · JPL
274855	2009 RB_{4}	—	September 14, 2009	Socorro	LINEAR	AMO	700 m	MPC · JPL
274856 Rosendosalvado	2009 RQ_{5}	Rosendosalvado	September 13, 2009	ESA OGS	Busch, M., Kresken, R.	·	650 m	MPC · JPL
274857	2009 RU_{11}	—	September 12, 2009	Kitt Peak	Spacewatch	·	3.6 km	MPC · JPL
274858	2009 RC_{15}	—	September 12, 2009	Kitt Peak	Spacewatch	·	1.5 km	MPC · JPL
274859	2009 RN_{25}	—	September 15, 2009	Kitt Peak	Spacewatch	·	740 m	MPC · JPL
274860 Emilylakdawalla	2009 RE_{26}	Emilylakdawalla	September 13, 2009	ESA OGS	Busch, M., Kresken, R.	EOS	2.4 km	MPC · JPL
274861	2009 RH_{31}	—	September 14, 2009	Kitt Peak	Spacewatch	·	770 m	MPC · JPL
274862	2009 RD_{35}	—	September 14, 2009	Kitt Peak	Spacewatch	·	2.6 km	MPC · JPL
274863	2009 RA_{49}	—	September 15, 2009	Kitt Peak	Spacewatch	KOR	1.2 km	MPC · JPL
274864	2009 RG_{50}	—	September 15, 2009	Kitt Peak	Spacewatch	·	2.0 km	MPC · JPL
274865	2009 RC_{52}	—	September 15, 2009	Kitt Peak	Spacewatch	·	1.5 km	MPC · JPL
274866	2009 RG_{53}	—	September 15, 2009	Kitt Peak	Spacewatch	·	1.9 km	MPC · JPL
274867	2009 RJ_{54}	—	September 15, 2009	Kitt Peak	Spacewatch	·	860 m	MPC · JPL
274868	2009 RM_{55}	—	September 15, 2009	Kitt Peak	Spacewatch	KOR	1.5 km	MPC · JPL
274869	2009 RS_{55}	—	September 15, 2009	Kitt Peak	Spacewatch	·	720 m	MPC · JPL
274870	2009 RH_{56}	—	September 15, 2009	Kitt Peak	Spacewatch	L4	14 km	MPC · JPL
274871	2009 RK_{59}	—	September 15, 2009	Kitt Peak	Spacewatch	·	2.2 km	MPC · JPL
274872	2009 RT_{67}	—	September 15, 2009	Mount Lemmon	Mount Lemmon Survey	·	910 m	MPC · JPL
274873	2009 RT_{70}	—	September 12, 2009	Kitt Peak	Spacewatch	THM	4.3 km	MPC · JPL
274874	2009 RO_{71}	—	September 15, 2009	Kitt Peak	Spacewatch	KOR	1.3 km	MPC · JPL
274875	2009 RD_{72}	—	September 15, 2009	Kitt Peak	Spacewatch	HOF	2.7 km	MPC · JPL
274876	2009 RE_{74}	—	September 15, 2009	Kitt Peak	Spacewatch	·	2.3 km	MPC · JPL
274877	2009 RO_{75}	—	September 15, 2009	Kitt Peak	Spacewatch	·	1.2 km	MPC · JPL
274878	2009 SU_{12}	—	September 16, 2009	Mount Lemmon	Mount Lemmon Survey	·	1.1 km	MPC · JPL
274879	2009 SE_{13}	—	September 16, 2009	Mount Lemmon	Mount Lemmon Survey	·	870 m	MPC · JPL
274880	2009 ST_{14}	—	September 18, 2009	Bisei SG Center	BATTeRS	·	1.3 km	MPC · JPL
274881	2009 SE_{25}	—	September 16, 2009	Kitt Peak	Spacewatch	·	820 m	MPC · JPL
274882	2009 ST_{34}	—	September 16, 2009	Kitt Peak	Spacewatch	·	900 m	MPC · JPL
274883	2009 SG_{39}	—	September 16, 2009	Kitt Peak	Spacewatch	·	790 m	MPC · JPL
274884	2009 SK_{42}	—	September 16, 2009	Kitt Peak	Spacewatch	·	1.1 km	MPC · JPL
274885	2009 SP_{43}	—	September 16, 2009	Kitt Peak	Spacewatch	·	960 m	MPC · JPL
274886	2009 SH_{46}	—	September 16, 2009	Kitt Peak	Spacewatch	·	2.0 km	MPC · JPL
274887	2009 SN_{55}	—	September 17, 2009	Kitt Peak	Spacewatch	·	1.4 km	MPC · JPL
274888	2009 SB_{58}	—	September 17, 2009	Kitt Peak	Spacewatch	·	2.6 km	MPC · JPL
274889	2009 SR_{60}	—	September 17, 2009	Kitt Peak	Spacewatch	·	2.6 km	MPC · JPL
274890	2009 SV_{62}	—	September 17, 2009	Mount Lemmon	Mount Lemmon Survey	·	1.0 km	MPC · JPL
274891	2009 SN_{66}	—	September 17, 2009	Kitt Peak	Spacewatch	·	4.3 km	MPC · JPL
274892	2009 SX_{66}	—	September 17, 2009	Kitt Peak	Spacewatch	·	1.5 km	MPC · JPL
274893	2009 SA_{74}	—	September 17, 2009	Kitt Peak	Spacewatch	·	2.2 km	MPC · JPL
274894	2009 SL_{74}	—	September 17, 2009	Kitt Peak	Spacewatch	·	1.1 km	MPC · JPL
274895	2009 SQ_{77}	—	September 17, 2009	Mount Lemmon	Mount Lemmon Survey	·	2.6 km	MPC · JPL
274896	2009 SW_{80}	—	September 18, 2009	Mount Lemmon	Mount Lemmon Survey	·	660 m	MPC · JPL
274897	2009 SF_{81}	—	September 18, 2009	Mount Lemmon	Mount Lemmon Survey	·	700 m	MPC · JPL
274898	2009 SN_{86}	—	September 18, 2009	Kitt Peak	Spacewatch	·	1.8 km	MPC · JPL
274899	2009 SV_{87}	—	September 18, 2009	Kitt Peak	Spacewatch	·	2.0 km	MPC · JPL
274900	2009 SJ_{91}	—	September 18, 2009	Kitt Peak	Spacewatch	·	1.3 km	MPC · JPL

== 274901–275000 ==
back to top

Designation			Discovery			Properties		Ref
Permanent	Provisional	Named after	Date	Site	Discoverer(s)	Category	Diam.	Ref
274901	2009 SB_{96}	—	September 19, 2009	Kitt Peak	Spacewatch	·	1.1 km	MPC · JPL
274902	2009 SU_{102}	—	September 24, 2009	Mayhill	Lowe, A.	SUL	2.3 km	MPC · JPL
274903	2009 SK_{106}	—	September 16, 2009	Mount Lemmon	Mount Lemmon Survey	·	1.5 km	MPC · JPL
274904	2009 SL_{107}	—	September 16, 2009	Kitt Peak	Spacewatch	·	1.7 km	MPC · JPL
274905	2009 SR_{110}	—	September 17, 2009	Kitt Peak	Spacewatch	L4	10 km	MPC · JPL
274906	2009 SR_{111}	—	September 18, 2009	Kitt Peak	Spacewatch	V	1.1 km	MPC · JPL
274907	2009 SP_{118}	—	September 18, 2009	Kitt Peak	Spacewatch	·	2.5 km	MPC · JPL
274908	2009 SU_{128}	—	September 18, 2009	Kitt Peak	Spacewatch	MAS	970 m	MPC · JPL
274909	2009 SD_{134}	—	September 18, 2009	Kitt Peak	Spacewatch	·	4.4 km	MPC · JPL
274910	2009 SP_{136}	—	September 18, 2009	Kitt Peak	Spacewatch	·	800 m	MPC · JPL
274911	2009 ST_{136}	—	September 18, 2009	Kitt Peak	Spacewatch	·	3.5 km	MPC · JPL
274912	2009 SL_{138}	—	September 18, 2009	Kitt Peak	Spacewatch	·	1.9 km	MPC · JPL
274913	2009 SZ_{138}	—	September 18, 2009	Mount Lemmon	Mount Lemmon Survey	·	3.0 km	MPC · JPL
274914	2009 SB_{139}	—	September 18, 2009	Mount Lemmon	Mount Lemmon Survey	EUN	1.3 km	MPC · JPL
274915	2009 SO_{142}	—	September 19, 2009	Kitt Peak	Spacewatch	·	1.6 km	MPC · JPL
274916	2009 SH_{146}	—	September 19, 2009	Mount Lemmon	Mount Lemmon Survey	·	1.4 km	MPC · JPL
274917	2009 SW_{149}	—	September 20, 2009	Kitt Peak	Spacewatch	·	1.3 km	MPC · JPL
274918	2009 SU_{150}	—	September 20, 2009	Kitt Peak	Spacewatch	NEM	2.5 km	MPC · JPL
274919	2009 SX_{153}	—	September 20, 2009	Kitt Peak	Spacewatch	·	1.4 km	MPC · JPL
274920	2009 SS_{154}	—	September 20, 2009	Kitt Peak	Spacewatch	·	1.4 km	MPC · JPL
274921	2009 SM_{156}	—	September 20, 2009	Kitt Peak	Spacewatch	·	940 m	MPC · JPL
274922	2009 SH_{158}	—	September 20, 2009	Kitt Peak	Spacewatch	·	1.3 km	MPC · JPL
274923	2009 SC_{161}	—	September 21, 2009	La Sagra	OAM	PHO	1.5 km	MPC · JPL
274924	2009 SM_{161}	—	September 21, 2009	Catalina	CSS	NYS	1.0 km	MPC · JPL
274925	2009 SY_{164}	—	September 21, 2009	Kitt Peak	Spacewatch	EUN	1.5 km	MPC · JPL
274926	2009 SU_{168}	—	September 22, 2009	Bergisch Gladbach	W. Bickel	DOR	2.5 km	MPC · JPL
274927	2009 SC_{169}	—	September 24, 2009	Mount Lemmon	Mount Lemmon Survey	·	2.1 km	MPC · JPL
274928 von Weinberg	2009 SU_{170}	von Weinberg	September 26, 2009	Taunus	R. Kling, Zimmer, U.	·	1.5 km	MPC · JPL
274929	2009 SF_{171}	—	September 23, 2009	Mount Lemmon	Mount Lemmon Survey	NYS	1.1 km	MPC · JPL
274930	2009 SH_{185}	—	September 21, 2009	Kitt Peak	Spacewatch	WIT	1.0 km	MPC · JPL
274931	2009 SD_{197}	—	September 22, 2009	Kitt Peak	Spacewatch	·	1.2 km	MPC · JPL
274932	2009 SN_{201}	—	September 22, 2009	Kitt Peak	Spacewatch	THM	2.3 km	MPC · JPL
274933	2009 SP_{202}	—	September 22, 2009	Kitt Peak	Spacewatch	·	3.3 km	MPC · JPL
274934	2009 SA_{203}	—	September 22, 2009	Kitt Peak	Spacewatch	NYS	1.5 km	MPC · JPL
274935	2009 ST_{205}	—	September 22, 2009	Kitt Peak	Spacewatch	·	910 m	MPC · JPL
274936	2009 SS_{206}	—	September 23, 2009	Kitt Peak	Spacewatch	NEM	2.6 km	MPC · JPL
274937	2009 SU_{212}	—	September 23, 2009	Kitt Peak	Spacewatch	·	1.0 km	MPC · JPL
274938	2009 SG_{219}	—	September 24, 2009	Mount Lemmon	Mount Lemmon Survey	·	1.9 km	MPC · JPL
274939	2009 SK_{222}	—	September 25, 2009	Mount Lemmon	Mount Lemmon Survey	·	1.3 km	MPC · JPL
274940	2009 SS_{233}	—	September 21, 2009	Mount Lemmon	Mount Lemmon Survey	T_{j} (2.97)	4.1 km	MPC · JPL
274941	2009 SG_{235}	—	September 19, 2009	Mount Lemmon	Mount Lemmon Survey	·	2.3 km	MPC · JPL
274942	2009 SY_{236}	—	March 14, 2007	Mount Lemmon	Mount Lemmon Survey	·	2.1 km	MPC · JPL
274943	2009 SZ_{238}	—	September 16, 2009	Catalina	CSS	·	2.4 km	MPC · JPL
274944	2009 SF_{244}	—	September 17, 2009	Kitt Peak	Spacewatch	·	2.4 km	MPC · JPL
274945	2009 SJ_{261}	—	September 22, 2009	Kitt Peak	Spacewatch	·	2.2 km	MPC · JPL
274946	2009 SE_{263}	—	September 23, 2009	Mount Lemmon	Mount Lemmon Survey	·	820 m	MPC · JPL
274947	2009 SD_{267}	—	September 23, 2009	Mount Lemmon	Mount Lemmon Survey	V	670 m	MPC · JPL
274948	2009 SV_{273}	—	September 25, 2009	Kitt Peak	Spacewatch	·	1.9 km	MPC · JPL
274949	2009 SO_{277}	—	September 25, 2009	Kitt Peak	Spacewatch	KOR	1.4 km	MPC · JPL
274950	2009 SH_{278}	—	September 25, 2009	Kitt Peak	Spacewatch	·	1.4 km	MPC · JPL
274951	2009 ST_{278}	—	September 25, 2009	Kitt Peak	Spacewatch	·	2.4 km	MPC · JPL
274952	2009 SM_{283}	—	September 25, 2009	Kitt Peak	Spacewatch	·	1.9 km	MPC · JPL
274953	2009 SY_{291}	—	September 26, 2009	Kitt Peak	Spacewatch	·	1.3 km	MPC · JPL
274954	2009 SJ_{295}	—	September 27, 2009	Mount Lemmon	Mount Lemmon Survey	·	1.2 km	MPC · JPL
274955	2009 SR_{299}	—	September 29, 2009	Mount Lemmon	Mount Lemmon Survey	·	4.3 km	MPC · JPL
274956	2009 SV_{299}	—	September 17, 2009	Mount Lemmon	Mount Lemmon Survey	·	1.5 km	MPC · JPL
274957	2009 SP_{300}	—	September 16, 2009	Kitt Peak	Spacewatch	CLA	2.1 km	MPC · JPL
274958	2009 SH_{302}	—	September 16, 2009	Mount Lemmon	Mount Lemmon Survey	HYG	3.1 km	MPC · JPL
274959	2009 SS_{304}	—	September 17, 2009	Kitt Peak	Spacewatch	MAS	640 m	MPC · JPL
274960	2009 SD_{320}	—	September 20, 2009	Mount Lemmon	Mount Lemmon Survey	EOS	2.9 km	MPC · JPL
274961	2009 SV_{326}	—	September 17, 2009	Mount Lemmon	Mount Lemmon Survey	·	1.7 km	MPC · JPL
274962	2009 SM_{327}	—	September 25, 2009	Catalina	CSS	·	2.3 km	MPC · JPL
274963	2009 SF_{329}	—	September 16, 2009	Mount Lemmon	Mount Lemmon Survey	·	1.8 km	MPC · JPL
274964	2009 SE_{331}	—	September 19, 2009	Catalina	CSS	·	850 m	MPC · JPL
274965	2009 SL_{333}	—	September 27, 2009	Mount Lemmon	Mount Lemmon Survey	·	1.2 km	MPC · JPL
274966	2009 SV_{333}	—	September 17, 2009	Kitt Peak	Spacewatch	fast	960 m	MPC · JPL
274967	2009 SG_{342}	—	September 16, 2009	Kitt Peak	Spacewatch	·	1.9 km	MPC · JPL
274968	2009 SS_{342}	—	September 16, 2009	Kitt Peak	Spacewatch	·	860 m	MPC · JPL
274969	2009 SJ_{346}	—	September 24, 2009	Kitt Peak	Spacewatch	·	1.5 km	MPC · JPL
274970	2009 SK_{347}	—	September 28, 2009	Mount Lemmon	Mount Lemmon Survey	L4	10 km	MPC · JPL
274971	2009 SU_{347}	—	September 16, 2009	Kitt Peak	Spacewatch	AST	1.6 km	MPC · JPL
274972	2009 SO_{348}	—	September 22, 2009	Mount Lemmon	Mount Lemmon Survey	·	3.5 km	MPC · JPL
274973	2009 SP_{348}	—	September 18, 2009	Catalina	CSS	URS	5.2 km	MPC · JPL
274974	2009 SH_{351}	—	September 29, 2009	Mount Lemmon	Mount Lemmon Survey	(2076)	1.2 km	MPC · JPL
274975	2009 SE_{353}	—	September 16, 2009	Kitt Peak	Spacewatch	·	1.4 km	MPC · JPL
274976	2009 SR_{355}	—	April 7, 2003	Kitt Peak	Spacewatch	L4	10 km	MPC · JPL
274977	2009 SH_{356}	—	September 16, 2009	Kitt Peak	Spacewatch	·	1.4 km	MPC · JPL
274978	2009 SH_{360}	—	September 27, 2009	Mount Lemmon	Mount Lemmon Survey	·	3.8 km	MPC · JPL
274979	2009 SP_{360}	—	September 29, 2009	Mount Lemmon	Mount Lemmon Survey	·	3.8 km	MPC · JPL
274980	2009 SL_{362}	—	September 21, 2009	Mount Lemmon	Mount Lemmon Survey	·	1.1 km	MPC · JPL
274981 Petrsu	2009 TV_{2}	Petrsu	October 12, 2009	Tzec Maun	A. Novichonok, D. Chestnov	KOR	1.6 km	MPC · JPL
274982	2009 TO_{3}	—	October 11, 2009	La Sagra	OAM	·	1.8 km	MPC · JPL
274983	2009 TH_{4}	—	October 13, 2009	Mayhill	Lowe, A.	·	1.6 km	MPC · JPL
274984	2009 TD_{5}	—	October 11, 2009	La Sagra	OAM	·	860 m	MPC · JPL
274985	2009 TW_{5}	—	October 11, 2009	La Sagra	OAM	·	770 m	MPC · JPL
274986	2009 TY_{6}	—	October 12, 2009	La Sagra	OAM	·	2.2 km	MPC · JPL
274987	2009 TB_{7}	—	October 12, 2009	La Sagra	OAM	EMA	5.0 km	MPC · JPL
274988	2009 TG_{9}	—	October 13, 2009	La Sagra	OAM	L4	10 km	MPC · JPL
274989	2009 TS_{11}	—	October 14, 2009	Bergisch Gladbach	W. Bickel	·	4.0 km	MPC · JPL
274990	2009 TO_{14}	—	October 12, 2009	La Sagra	OAM	·	940 m	MPC · JPL
274991	2009 TQ_{14}	—	October 12, 2009	La Sagra	OAM	V	850 m	MPC · JPL
274992	2009 TE_{15}	—	October 13, 2009	Socorro	LINEAR	NYS	1.3 km	MPC · JPL
274993	2009 TB_{17}	—	October 14, 2009	La Sagra	OAM	EOS	3.1 km	MPC · JPL
274994	2009 TM_{21}	—	October 12, 2009	La Sagra	OAM	·	950 m	MPC · JPL
274995	2009 TB_{23}	—	October 14, 2009	La Sagra	OAM	·	3.7 km	MPC · JPL
274996	2009 TC_{23}	—	October 14, 2009	La Sagra	OAM	V	750 m	MPC · JPL
274997	2009 TG_{25}	—	October 14, 2009	Catalina	CSS	·	1.6 km	MPC · JPL
274998	2009 TA_{26}	—	October 14, 2009	Purple Mountain	PMO NEO Survey Program	·	1.3 km	MPC · JPL
274999	2009 TE_{27}	—	October 14, 2009	La Sagra	OAM	·	3.1 km	MPC · JPL
275000	2009 TV_{29}	—	October 15, 2009	Mount Lemmon	Mount Lemmon Survey	·	1.7 km	MPC · JPL

back to top

== See also ==
- Meanings of minor-planet names: 274001–275000
