= 274301 Wikipedia =

Main belt asteroid

- Orbital diagram of 274301 Wikipedia

Discovery
- Discovered by: Andrushivka Obs.
- Discovery site: Andrushivka Obs.
- Discovery date: 25 August 2008

Designations
- Pronunciation: /ˌwɪkiˈpiːdiə/ WIK-i-PEE-dee-ə
- Named after: Wikipedia (online encyclopedia)
- Alternative designations: 2008 QH_{24}; 1997 RO_{4}; 2007 FK_{34}
- Minor planet category: main belt · (inner); Vesta

Orbital characteristics
- Epoch 27 April 2019 (JD 2458600.5)
- Uncertainty parameter 0
- Observation arc: 20.62 yr (7,530 d)
- Aphelion: 2.7306 AU
- Perihelion: 2.0325 AU
- Semi-major axis: 2.3815 AU
- Eccentricity: 0.1466
- Orbital period (sidereal): 3.68 yr (1,342 d)
- Mean anomaly: 335.71°
- Mean motion: 0° 16^{m} 5.52^{s} / day
- Inclination: 6.7312°
- Longitude of ascending node: 183.37°
- Argument of perihelion: 139.37°

Physical characteristics
- Mean diameter: 0.95 km (est. at 0.35); 1.5±0.5 km (assumed) ~1.385 km
- Spectral type: V or S (SDSS-MOC)
- Absolute magnitude (H): 17.00

274301 Wikipedia, provisional designation 2008 QH_{24}, is a Vestian asteroid orbiting in the inner region of the asteroid belt, approximately 1 kilometer (0.6 mi) in diameter. It was discovered on 25 August 2008 by astronomers at the Andrushivka Astronomical Observatory in northern Ukraine. The asteroid was named after the online encyclopedia Wikipedia in January 2013.

== Etymology ==
The decision of the Committee for Small Body Nomenclature to assign the name "Wikipedia" to the asteroid was published in the Minor Planet Circulars on 27 January 2013 (M.P.C. 82403). The asteroid received the number 274301. The name was proposed by Andriy Makukha, a board member of Wikimedia Ukraine. It was submitted to the Committee by the owner of the observatory, Yuri Ivashchenko. It reads:

Wikipedia is a free, copyleft, collaboratively edited online encyclopedia launched in 2001. In 11 years of its compilation it became one of the largest reference works and one of the most visited web-sites on the Internet. It is developed in more than 270 languages by enthusiasts from all over the world.

— International Astronomical Union, 13 January 2013

== Observation ==
The asteroid now named Wikipedia was discovered by astronomers from the Andrushivka Astronomical Observatory (A50) in Ukraine, the country's only privately owned observatory, which has discovered over 120 asteroids since 2003. It was first observed by the Andrushivka team on 25 August 2008 at 22:47 UTC. It was also observed on the next night and it received the provisional designation 2008 QH_{24}. After it was also observed on 6 September by the Andrushivka team, the orbit of the asteroid was calculated accurately. It was shown that the asteroid 2008 QH_{24} was the same as 1997 RO_{4} and 2007 FK_{34} previously spotted by observatories Caussols-ODAS (France), Mount Lemmon Survey and Steward Observatory (both in Arizona, U.S.).

== Characteristics ==
Wikipedia is a member of the Vesta family (401), one of the most numerous asteroid families in the asteroid belt. It is located in the proximity of 21791 Mattweegman, one of the family's principal members. Vestian asteroids have a composition akin to cumulate eucrites (HED meteorites). They are thought to have originated deep within Vesta's crust, possibly from the Rheasilvia crater, a large impact crater on its southern hemisphere which formed as the result of a subcatastrophic collision. Wikipedia orbits the Sun in the inner asteroid belt at a distance of 2.0–2.7 AU (300–400 million km) once every 3 years and 8 months (1,342 days; semi-major axis of 2.38 AU). Its orbit has an eccentricity of 0.15 and an inclination of 7° with respect to the ecliptic. The asteroid's observation arc begins almost 11 years prior to its official discovery, with its first observation being 1997 RO_{4} by the ODAS survey in September 1997.

== See also ==
- List of minor planets
