= Andrushivka Astronomical Observatory =

Astronomical observatory in Ukraine

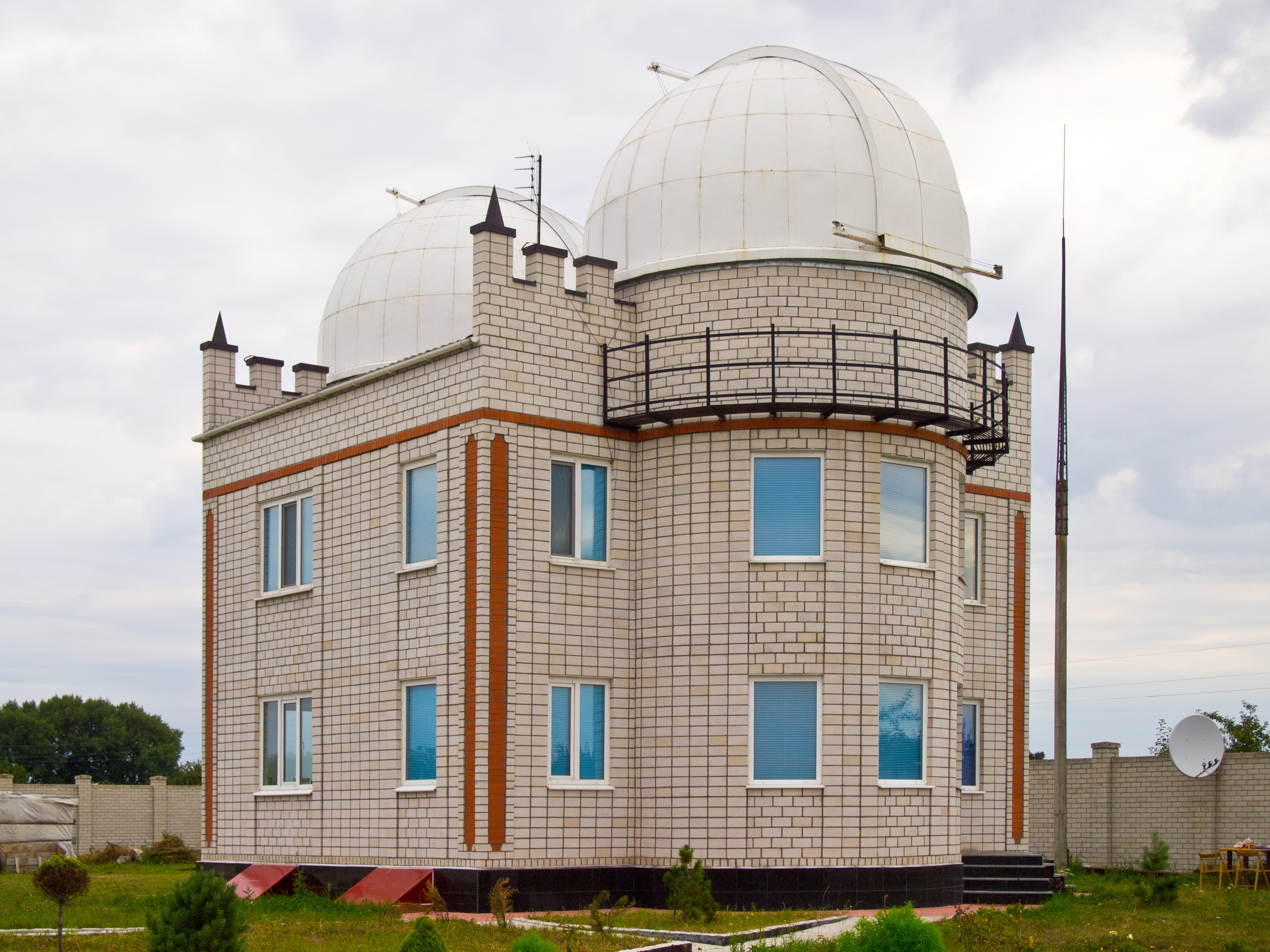
- The Andrushivka Astronomical Observatory in Andrushivka, northern Ukraine
- Observatory code: A50
- Location: Zhytomyr Oblast, Gal'chin, Ukraine
- Coordinates: 50°00′02″N 28°59′50″E
- Altitude: 214 m (702 ft)
- Established: 12 April 2001
- Website: www.aao.gluk.org
- Location of Andrushivka Astronomical Observatory
- Related media on Commons

Minor planets discovered: 121
see § List of discovered minor planets

Andrushivka Astronomical Observatory (Ukrainian: Андрушівська астрономічна обсерваторія) is a private astronomical observatory in the town suburbs of Andrushivka, Zhytomyr Oblast, Ukraine. It was established in 2001. The founder and director of the observatory is Yuri Ivashchenko. The observatory has IAU observatory code A50.

On September 18, 2003 the observatory discovered a main-belt asteroid, which was later named after the town, 133293 Andrushivka. On October 17, 2007, 175636 Zvyagel was discovered at the observatory. It was named Zvyagel as it was the 750th anniversary of the city. On August 25, 2008 another main belt asteroid was discovered which was named 274301 Wikipedia after the encyclopedia in January 2013.

== Instruments ==
The main instrument is a 60 cm Zeiss-600 Cassegrain reflector made by Carl Zeiss Jena.

== List of discovered minor planets ==
More than a hundred minor planets were discovered at the Andrushivka Astronomical Observatory, not counting yet unnumbered bodies such as the near-Earth object of the Apollo group, 2008 KB12, for which the observatory will be likely credited with its discovery by the Minor Planet Center.

| 117240 Zhytomyr | 19 September 2004 | list |
| 133293 Andrushivka | 18 September 2003 | list |
| (152217) 2005 RR22 | 10 September 2005 | list |
| 155116 Verkhivnya | 8 October 2005 | list |
| 159011 Radomyshl | 7 October 2004 | list |
| 159181 Berdychiv | 29 October 2005 | list |
| 161962 Galchyn | 27 April 2007 | list |
| 175636 Zvyagel | 17 October 2007 | list |
| 177982 Popilnia | 17 August 2006 | list |
| 181249 Tkachenko | 30 October 2005 | list |
| 185250 Korostyshiv | 17 October 2006 | list |
| 190026 Iskorosten | 16 August 2004 | list |
| 199986 Chervone | 9 May 2007 | list |
| 202778 Dmytria | 16 October 2007 | list |
| 207585 Lubar | 17 August 2006 | list |
| (207653) 2007 OS_{3} | 18 July 2007 | list |
| 207695 Olgakopyl | 8 September 2007 | list |
| 207899 Grinmalia | 21 October 2008 | list |
| 212465 Goroshky | 23 August 2006 | list |
| 212723 Klitschko | 14 September 2007 | list |

| 214487 Baranivka | 29 October 2005 | list |
| 216451 Irsha | 19 April 2009 | list |
| 216910 Vnukov | 13 May 2009 | list |
| 217420 Olevsk | 31 August 2005 | list |
| 220418 Golovyno | 23 September 2003 | list |
| 221073 Ovruch | 23 September 2005 | list |
| (226858) 2004 TY_{13} | 8 October 2004 | list |
| 227326 Narodychi | 11 October 2005 | list |
| (235615) 2004 PS_{104} | 13 August 2004 | list |
| 239307 Kruchynenko | 24 August 2007 | list |
| 240381 Emilchyne | 29 September 2003 | list |
| 241192 Pulyny | 21 September 2007 | list |
| 241538 Chudniv | 10 March 2010 | list |
| 243204 Kubanchoria | 16 October 2007 | list |
| 245890 Krynychenka | 25 August 2006 | list |
| 246132 Lugyny | 9 July 2007 | list |
| 246164 Zdvyzhensk | 22 August 2007 | list |
| 251001 Sluch | 28 July 2006 | list |
| 251018 Liubirena | 16 August 2006 | list |
| 251449 Olexakorolʹ | 11 February 2008 | list |

| 253536 Tymchenko | 22 September 2003 | list |
| 261291 Fucecchio | 31 October 2005 | list |
| 262418 Samofalov | 17 October 2006 | list |
| (263349) 2008 CN_{117} | 11 February 2008 | list |
| (266574) 2008 HK_{3} | 24 April 2008 | list |
| 269245 Catastini | 27 August 2008 | list |
| 269251 Kolomna | 26 August 2008 | list |
| 269252 Bogdanstupka | 27 August 2008 | list |
| 274300 UNESCO | 25 August 2008 | list |
| 274301 Wikipedia | 25 August 2008 | list |
| 274333 Voznyukigor | 2 September 2008 | list |
| 274334 Kyivplaniy | 3 September 2008 | list |
| 274843 Mykhailopetrenko | 24 August 2009 | list |
| (275225) 2009 WO_{215} | 20 November 2009 | list |
| (278386) 2007 NK_{2} | 13 July 2007 | list |
| 278609 Avrudenko | 5 August 2008 | list |
| (278645) 2008 RQ_{22} | 4 September 2008 | list |
| 281459 Kyrylenko | 27 September 2008 | list |
| (284754) 2008 VD_{13} | 6 November 2008 | list |
| (287875) 2003 SV_{313} | 29 September 2003 | list |

| 290127 Linakostenko | 29 August 2005 | list |
| (291855) 2006 ON_{14} | 28 July 2006 | list |
| 291923 Kuzmaskryabin | 16 August 2006 | list |
| 293707 Govoradloanatoly | 16 August 2007 | list |
| (294814) 2008 CJ_{117} | 11 February 2008 | list |
| (295329) 2008 HG_{2} | 24 April 2008 | list |
| (295492) 2008 RT_{22} | 5 September 2008 | list |
| (295841) 2008 VT_{13} | 7 November 2008 | list |
| (295842) 2008 VN_{14} | 7 November 2008 | list |
| 296987 Piotrflin | 11 March 2010 | list |
| 300932 Kyslyuk | 11 February 2008 | list |
| 302932 Francoballoni | 29 September 2003 | list |
| (311784) 2006 UT_{61} | 17 October 2006 | list |
| (311786) 2006 UW_{62} | 17 October 2006 | list |
| 315276 Yurigradovsky | 1 October 2007 | list |
| (315492) 2008 AV | 4 January 2008 | list |
| 316084 Mykolapokropyvny | 26 May 2009 | list |
| 318794 Uglia | 25 September 2005 | list |
| 325368 Ihorhuk | 25 August 2008 | list |
| (325372) 2008 RS_{22} | 5 September 2008 | list |

| (328509) 2009 QC_{10} | 21 August 2009 | list |
| (329637) 2003 SV_{126} | 19 September 2003 | list |
| (330753) 2008 ST_{148} | 27 September 2008 | list |
| 332084 Vasyakulbeda | 29 October 2005 | list |
| (332409) 2007 NH_{2} | 13 July 2007 | list |
| (332434) 2007 UZ_{4} | 16 October 2007 | list |
| (335416) 2005 UR_{12} | 29 October 2005 | list |
| (336094) 2008 HN_{3} | 24 April 2008 | list |
| (336470) 2008 VQ_{14} | 8 November 2008 | list |
| (341109) 2007 LQ | 8 June 2007 | list |
| (342666) 2008 VC_{13} | 6 November 2008 | list |
| (345848) 2007 OX_{2} | 18 July 2007 | list |
| 348239 Societadante | 20 September 2004 | list |
| (352167) 2007 RN_{39} | 8 September 2007 | list |
| (352654) 2008 QJ_{24} | 25 August 2008 | list |
| (355683) 2008 FE_{7} | 28 March 2008 | list |
| (361329) 2006 UU_{61} | 17 October 2006 | list |
| (361674) 2007 UB_{5} | 16 October 2007 | list |
| (369274) 2009 QD_{10} | 21 August 2009 | list |
| (379350) 2009 WG_{132} | 20 November 2009 | list |

| (379355) 2009 WJ_{159} | 20 November 2009 | list |
| (384074) 2008 VM_{14} | 7 November 2008 | list |
| (386102) 2007 RL_{39} | 8 September 2007 | list |
| (386167) 2007 UL_{3} | 16 October 2007 | list |
| (388057) 2005 TS_{49} | 7 October 2005 | list |
| (388952) 2008 TZ_{26} | 8 October 2008 | list |
| (391834) 2008 SW_{148} | 27 September 2008 | list |
| (394805) 2008 RY_{77} | 6 September 2008 | list |
| (398474) 2011 UK_{127} | 16 August 2007 | list |
| (399673) 2004 SW_{19} | 19 September 2004 | list |
| (402964) 2007 UP_{3} | 17 October 2007 | list |
| (417571) 2006 UX_{214} | 17 October 2006 | list |
| (417883) 2007 QR_{3} | 23 August 2007 | list |
| (418691) 2008 UR_{6} | 22 October 2008 | list |
| (424648) 2008 PH_{18} | 7 August 2008 | list |
| (432232) 2009 HQ_{58} | 25 April 2009 | list |
| (436049) 2009 QE_{30} | 24 August 2009 | list |
| (436371) 2010 NJ_{3} | 15 July 2010 | list |
| (438570) 2007 UM_{3} | 16 October 2007 | list |
| (440794) 2006 OO_{14} | 28 July 2006 | list |

| (456963) 2008 AN_{87} | 12 January 2008 | list |
All discoveries were credited by the MPC with Andrushivka

== See also ==
- List of asteroid-discovering observatories
- List of minor planet discoverers § Discovering dedicated institutions
