= List of minor planets: 302001–303000 =

The following is a partial list of minor planets, running from minor-planet number 302001 through 303000, inclusive. The primary data for this and other partial lists is based on JPL's "Small-Body Orbital Elements" and data available from the Minor Planet Center. Critical list information is also provided by the MPC, unless otherwise specified from Lowell Observatory. A detailed description of the table's columns and additional sources are given on the main page including a complete list of every page in this series, and a statistical break-up on the dynamical classification of minor planets.

Also see the summary list of all named bodies in numerical and alphabetical order, and the corresponding naming citations for the number range of this particular list. New namings may only be added to this list after official publication, as the preannouncement of names is condemned by the Working Group for Small Bodies Nomenclature of the International Astronomical Union.

Near-Earth obj.	MBA (inner)	MBA (outer)	Centaur
Mars-crosser	MBA (middle)	Jupiter trojan	Trans-Neptunian obj.
Unclassified

== 302001–302100 ==
Designation			Discovery			Properties		Ref
Permanent	Provisional	Named after	Date	Site	Discoverer(s)	Category	Diam.	Ref
302001	2000 QB_{166}	—	August 31, 2000	Socorro	LINEAR	·	3.5 km	MPC · JPL
302002	2000 QU_{185}	—	August 26, 2000	Socorro	LINEAR	·	1.6 km	MPC · JPL
302003	2000 QV_{223}	—	August 25, 2000	Socorro	LINEAR	·	3.0 km	MPC · JPL
302004	2000 QV_{226}	—	August 31, 2000	Socorro	LINEAR	·	1.3 km	MPC · JPL
302005	2000 RF_{8}	—	September 1, 2000	Socorro	LINEAR	·	1.4 km	MPC · JPL
302006	2000 RM_{34}	—	September 1, 2000	Socorro	LINEAR	·	1.4 km	MPC · JPL
302007	2000 RA_{83}	—	September 1, 2000	Socorro	LINEAR	EOS	2.9 km	MPC · JPL
302008	2000 RT_{84}	—	September 2, 2000	Anderson Mesa	LONEOS	·	3.0 km	MPC · JPL
302009	2000 RA_{98}	—	September 5, 2000	Anderson Mesa	LONEOS	·	6.6 km	MPC · JPL
302010	2000 SH_{8}	—	September 21, 2000	Socorro	LINEAR	APO	610 m	MPC · JPL
302011	2000 SN_{15}	—	September 23, 2000	Socorro	LINEAR	·	3.2 km	MPC · JPL
302012	2000 SM_{16}	—	September 23, 2000	Socorro	LINEAR	·	2.6 km	MPC · JPL
302013	2000 SA_{18}	—	September 23, 2000	Socorro	LINEAR	V	1.1 km	MPC · JPL
302014	2000 SU_{27}	—	September 23, 2000	Socorro	LINEAR	·	3.5 km	MPC · JPL
302015	2000 SS_{31}	—	September 24, 2000	Socorro	LINEAR	·	3.8 km	MPC · JPL
302016	2000 SE_{42}	—	September 24, 2000	Socorro	LINEAR	·	2.8 km	MPC · JPL
302017	2000 SS_{82}	—	September 24, 2000	Socorro	LINEAR	·	1.4 km	MPC · JPL
302018	2000 SV_{92}	—	September 23, 2000	Socorro	LINEAR	·	3.2 km	MPC · JPL
302019	2000 SR_{95}	—	September 23, 2000	Socorro	LINEAR	TIR	3.0 km	MPC · JPL
302020	2000 SN_{96}	—	September 23, 2000	Socorro	LINEAR	·	3.1 km	MPC · JPL
302021	2000 SW_{102}	—	September 24, 2000	Socorro	LINEAR	·	1.2 km	MPC · JPL
302022	2000 SA_{131}	—	September 22, 2000	Socorro	LINEAR	·	1.7 km	MPC · JPL
302023	2000 SD_{133}	—	September 23, 2000	Socorro	LINEAR	·	3.7 km	MPC · JPL
302024	2000 SM_{134}	—	September 23, 2000	Socorro	LINEAR	·	1.1 km	MPC · JPL
302025	2000 SD_{135}	—	September 23, 2000	Socorro	LINEAR	EOS	2.9 km	MPC · JPL
302026	2000 SF_{135}	—	September 23, 2000	Socorro	LINEAR	·	1.6 km	MPC · JPL
302027	2000 SR_{153}	—	September 24, 2000	Socorro	LINEAR	·	1.3 km	MPC · JPL
302028	2000 SN_{164}	—	September 26, 2000	Socorro	LINEAR	H	750 m	MPC · JPL
302029	2000 SW_{181}	—	September 19, 2000	Haleakala	NEAT	·	1.3 km	MPC · JPL
302030	2000 SB_{206}	—	September 24, 2000	Socorro	LINEAR	·	4.7 km	MPC · JPL
302031	2000 SK_{214}	—	September 26, 2000	Socorro	LINEAR	MAS	760 m	MPC · JPL
302032	2000 SS_{240}	—	September 26, 2000	Socorro	LINEAR	H	740 m	MPC · JPL
302033	2000 SQ_{277}	—	September 30, 2000	Socorro	LINEAR	·	1.5 km	MPC · JPL
302034	2000 SA_{285}	—	September 23, 2000	Socorro	LINEAR	V	1.0 km	MPC · JPL
302035	2000 SU_{285}	—	September 24, 2000	Socorro	LINEAR	EOS	2.6 km	MPC · JPL
302036	2000 SU_{286}	—	September 26, 2000	Socorro	LINEAR	·	2.9 km	MPC · JPL
302037	2000 SL_{288}	—	September 27, 2000	Socorro	LINEAR	·	2.7 km	MPC · JPL
302038	2000 SM_{288}	—	September 27, 2000	Socorro	LINEAR	·	4.5 km	MPC · JPL
302039	2000 SF_{291}	—	September 27, 2000	Socorro	LINEAR	·	1.5 km	MPC · JPL
302040	2000 SU_{302}	—	September 28, 2000	Socorro	LINEAR	·	4.1 km	MPC · JPL
302041	2000 SM_{305}	—	September 30, 2000	Socorro	LINEAR	TIR	3.3 km	MPC · JPL
302042	2000 ST_{314}	—	September 28, 2000	Socorro	LINEAR	·	3.7 km	MPC · JPL
302043	2000 SG_{333}	—	September 26, 2000	Haleakala	NEAT	·	4.1 km	MPC · JPL
302044	2000 SD_{341}	—	September 24, 2000	Socorro	LINEAR	NYS	1.0 km	MPC · JPL
302045	2000 SE_{343}	—	September 24, 2000	Socorro	LINEAR	·	3.5 km	MPC · JPL
302046	2000 SA_{348}	—	September 21, 2000	Socorro	LINEAR	·	3.6 km	MPC · JPL
302047	2000 SR_{350}	—	September 29, 2000	Anderson Mesa	LONEOS	·	3.0 km	MPC · JPL
302048	2000 TC_{18}	—	October 1, 2000	Socorro	LINEAR	·	1.3 km	MPC · JPL
302049	2000 TC_{24}	—	October 2, 2000	Socorro	LINEAR	V	930 m	MPC · JPL
302050	2000 TX_{24}	—	October 2, 2000	Socorro	LINEAR	EOS	3.2 km	MPC · JPL
302051	2000 TP_{27}	—	October 3, 2000	Socorro	LINEAR	EOS	2.8 km	MPC · JPL
302052	2000 TX_{64}	—	October 1, 2000	Socorro	LINEAR	·	1.2 km	MPC · JPL
302053	2000 UN_{1}	—	October 18, 2000	Kitt Peak	Spacewatch	NYS	1.0 km	MPC · JPL
302054	2000 UU_{1}	—	October 22, 2000	Kleť	Kleť	·	4.0 km	MPC · JPL
302055	2000 UV_{2}	—	October 22, 2000	Bergisch Gladbach	W. Bickel	·	1.3 km	MPC · JPL
302056	2000 UX_{15}	—	October 27, 2000	Kitt Peak	Spacewatch	·	1.2 km	MPC · JPL
302057	2000 UJ_{20}	—	October 24, 2000	Socorro	LINEAR	ERI	2.1 km	MPC · JPL
302058	2000 UJ_{29}	—	October 24, 2000	Socorro	LINEAR	H	2.2 km	MPC · JPL
302059	2000 UH_{69}	—	October 25, 2000	Socorro	LINEAR	·	1.4 km	MPC · JPL
302060	2000 UV_{85}	—	October 31, 2000	Socorro	LINEAR	·	2.0 km	MPC · JPL
302061	2000 UW_{111}	—	October 29, 2000	Kitt Peak	Spacewatch	·	4.7 km	MPC · JPL
302062	2000 VM_{38}	—	November 1, 2000	Kitt Peak	Spacewatch	·	1.3 km	MPC · JPL
302063	2000 VU_{59}	—	November 1, 2000	Socorro	LINEAR	MAS	680 m	MPC · JPL
302064	2000 WS_{6}	—	November 19, 2000	Socorro	LINEAR	(58892)	4.8 km	MPC · JPL
302065	2000 WM_{26}	—	November 25, 2000	Socorro	LINEAR	·	1.3 km	MPC · JPL
302066	2000 WC_{40}	—	November 20, 2000	Socorro	LINEAR	·	1.7 km	MPC · JPL
302067	2000 WW_{46}	—	November 21, 2000	Socorro	LINEAR	TIR	3.5 km	MPC · JPL
302068	2000 WO_{65}	—	November 28, 2000	Kitt Peak	Spacewatch	NYS	1.3 km	MPC · JPL
302069	2000 WC_{69}	—	November 19, 2000	Socorro	LINEAR	·	4.9 km	MPC · JPL
302070	2000 WC_{73}	—	November 20, 2000	Socorro	LINEAR	ARM	4.1 km	MPC · JPL
302071	2000 WX_{74}	—	November 20, 2000	Socorro	LINEAR	·	4.2 km	MPC · JPL
302072	2000 WK_{76}	—	November 20, 2000	Socorro	LINEAR	NYS	1.5 km	MPC · JPL
302073	2000 WX_{81}	—	November 20, 2000	Socorro	LINEAR	·	1.5 km	MPC · JPL
302074	2000 WF_{95}	—	November 21, 2000	Socorro	LINEAR	TIR	5.0 km	MPC · JPL
302075	2000 WK_{101}	—	November 25, 2000	Socorro	LINEAR	EUP	3.7 km	MPC · JPL
302076	2000 WL_{101}	—	November 25, 2000	Socorro	LINEAR	·	4.8 km	MPC · JPL
302077	2000 WC_{106}	—	November 29, 2000	Kitt Peak	Spacewatch	·	3.7 km	MPC · JPL
302078	2000 WC_{147}	—	November 29, 2000	Fountain Hills	C. W. Juels	T_{j} (2.94)	6.9 km	MPC · JPL
302079	2000 WQ_{152}	—	November 29, 2000	Socorro	LINEAR	·	5.0 km	MPC · JPL
302080	2000 WU_{155}	—	November 30, 2000	Socorro	LINEAR	·	7.0 km	MPC · JPL
302081	2000 WC_{180}	—	November 27, 2000	Socorro	LINEAR	ERI	1.7 km	MPC · JPL
302082	2000 WZ_{180}	—	November 5, 2000	Socorro	LINEAR	·	1.5 km	MPC · JPL
302083	2000 XP_{53}	—	December 14, 2000	Bohyunsan	Jeon, Y.-B., Lee, B.-C.	V	650 m	MPC · JPL
302084	2000 YT	—	December 16, 2000	Socorro	LINEAR	T_{j} (2.98)	7.6 km	MPC · JPL
302085	2000 YE_{13}	—	December 21, 2000	Kitt Peak	Spacewatch	·	1.6 km	MPC · JPL
302086	2000 YJ_{20}	—	December 25, 2000	Kitt Peak	Spacewatch	·	1.4 km	MPC · JPL
302087	2000 YQ_{31}	—	December 31, 2000	Kitt Peak	Spacewatch	NYS	1.8 km	MPC · JPL
302088	2000 YU_{33}	—	December 28, 2000	Socorro	LINEAR	·	3.4 km	MPC · JPL
302089	2000 YO_{48}	—	December 30, 2000	Socorro	LINEAR	·	1.6 km	MPC · JPL
302090	2000 YG_{72}	—	December 30, 2000	Socorro	LINEAR	·	2.7 km	MPC · JPL
302091	2000 YW_{122}	—	December 28, 2000	Socorro	LINEAR	EUP	5.7 km	MPC · JPL
302092	2001 AA_{19}	—	January 4, 2001	Haleakala	NEAT	·	4.6 km	MPC · JPL
302093	2001 BC_{54}	—	January 18, 2001	Kitt Peak	Spacewatch	·	2.3 km	MPC · JPL
302094	2001 CW_{29}	—	February 2, 2001	Anderson Mesa	LONEOS	·	1.8 km	MPC · JPL
302095	2001 DO_{12}	—	February 17, 2001	Socorro	LINEAR	·	1.8 km	MPC · JPL
302096	2001 DR_{93}	—	February 19, 2001	Socorro	LINEAR	·	3.7 km	MPC · JPL
302097	2001 EH_{3}	—	March 2, 2001	Haleakala	NEAT	·	1.7 km	MPC · JPL
302098	2001 FG_{31}	—	March 21, 2001	Socorro	LINEAR	T_{j} (2.9)	3.3 km	MPC · JPL
302099	2001 FT_{93}	—	March 16, 2001	Socorro	LINEAR	·	2.4 km	MPC · JPL
302100	2001 FA_{97}	—	March 16, 2001	Socorro	LINEAR	·	2.4 km	MPC · JPL

== 302101–302200 ==
back to top

Designation			Discovery			Properties		Ref
Permanent	Provisional	Named after	Date	Site	Discoverer(s)	Category	Diam.	Ref
302101	2001 FA_{125}	—	March 29, 2001	Anderson Mesa	LONEOS	·	1.3 km	MPC · JPL
302102	2001 FE_{125}	—	March 29, 2001	Anderson Mesa	LONEOS	·	1.6 km	MPC · JPL
302103	2001 FH_{153}	—	March 26, 2001	Socorro	LINEAR	·	1.5 km	MPC · JPL
302104	2001 FK_{156}	—	March 26, 2001	Haleakala	NEAT	BRG	1.5 km	MPC · JPL
302105	2001 FA_{164}	—	March 18, 2001	Kitt Peak	Spacewatch	·	1.5 km	MPC · JPL
302106	2001 GG_{4}	—	April 15, 2001	Kitt Peak	Spacewatch	·	1.4 km	MPC · JPL
302107	2001 HR_{56}	—	April 24, 2001	Haleakala	NEAT	·	3.8 km	MPC · JPL
302108	2001 KN_{29}	—	May 21, 2001	Socorro	LINEAR	·	2.8 km	MPC · JPL
302109	2001 KS_{50}	—	May 23, 2001	Kitt Peak	Spacewatch	JUN	1.4 km	MPC · JPL
302110	2001 KK_{74}	—	May 26, 2001	Socorro	LINEAR	·	2.7 km	MPC · JPL
302111	2001 MM_{3}	—	June 20, 2001	Palomar	NEAT	·	6.5 km	MPC · JPL
302112	2001 MK_{11}	—	June 25, 2001	Shishikui	Shishikui	·	4.3 km	MPC · JPL
302113	2001 MO_{18}	—	June 28, 2001	Kitt Peak	Spacewatch	·	1.9 km	MPC · JPL
302114	2001 OJ_{33}	—	July 19, 2001	Palomar	NEAT	·	1.0 km	MPC · JPL
302115	2001 OS_{38}	—	July 20, 2001	Palomar	NEAT	·	1.6 km	MPC · JPL
302116	2001 OR_{52}	—	July 21, 2001	Palomar	NEAT	DOR	3.2 km	MPC · JPL
302117	2001 PR_{37}	—	August 11, 2001	Palomar	NEAT	·	2.2 km	MPC · JPL
302118	2001 PM_{38}	—	August 11, 2001	Palomar	NEAT	GEF	1.8 km	MPC · JPL
302119	2001 PF_{43}	—	August 12, 2001	Haleakala	NEAT	·	760 m	MPC · JPL
302120	2001 QO_{13}	—	July 27, 2001	Anderson Mesa	LONEOS	·	820 m	MPC · JPL
302121	2001 QE_{36}	—	August 16, 2001	Socorro	LINEAR	·	920 m	MPC · JPL
302122	2001 QA_{113}	—	August 25, 2001	Socorro	LINEAR	·	3.6 km	MPC · JPL
302123	2001 QM_{128}	—	August 20, 2001	Socorro	LINEAR	·	2.9 km	MPC · JPL
302124	2001 QT_{157}	—	August 23, 2001	Anderson Mesa	LONEOS	(13314)	2.3 km	MPC · JPL
302125	2001 QP_{169}	—	August 21, 2001	Socorro	LINEAR	·	2.9 km	MPC · JPL
302126	2001 QA_{177}	—	August 26, 2001	Kitt Peak	Spacewatch	·	2.5 km	MPC · JPL
302127	2001 QQ_{183}	—	August 28, 2001	Bergisch Gladbach	W. Bickel	KOR	1.6 km	MPC · JPL
302128	2001 QG_{186}	—	August 21, 2001	Palomar	NEAT	H	1.0 km	MPC · JPL
302129	2001 QY_{193}	—	August 22, 2001	Socorro	LINEAR	·	1.0 km	MPC · JPL
302130	2001 QL_{194}	—	August 22, 2001	Socorro	LINEAR	·	940 m	MPC · JPL
302131	2001 QK_{209}	—	August 23, 2001	Anderson Mesa	LONEOS	·	2.3 km	MPC · JPL
302132	2001 QD_{243}	—	August 24, 2001	Socorro	LINEAR	·	560 m	MPC · JPL
302133	2001 RG_{35}	—	September 8, 2001	Socorro	LINEAR	·	1.0 km	MPC · JPL
302134	2001 RB_{41}	—	September 11, 2001	Socorro	LINEAR	·	2.5 km	MPC · JPL
302135	2001 RS_{56}	—	September 12, 2001	Socorro	LINEAR	·	930 m	MPC · JPL
302136	2001 RG_{82}	—	September 11, 2001	Anderson Mesa	LONEOS	·	900 m	MPC · JPL
302137	2001 RG_{84}	—	September 11, 2001	Anderson Mesa	LONEOS	·	820 m	MPC · JPL
302138	2001 RZ_{99}	—	September 12, 2001	Socorro	LINEAR	·	920 m	MPC · JPL
302139	2001 RT_{103}	—	September 12, 2001	Socorro	LINEAR	·	840 m	MPC · JPL
302140	2001 RL_{133}	—	September 12, 2001	Socorro	LINEAR	·	670 m	MPC · JPL
302141	2001 SD_{5}	—	September 18, 2001	Kitt Peak	Spacewatch	·	710 m	MPC · JPL
302142	2001 SF_{11}	—	September 16, 2001	Socorro	LINEAR	·	870 m	MPC · JPL
302143	2001 ST_{81}	—	September 20, 2001	Socorro	LINEAR	·	760 m	MPC · JPL
302144	2001 SQ_{83}	—	September 20, 2001	Socorro	LINEAR	·	2.4 km	MPC · JPL
302145	2001 SC_{89}	—	September 20, 2001	Socorro	LINEAR	AGN	1.5 km	MPC · JPL
302146	2001 SY_{94}	—	September 20, 2001	Socorro	LINEAR	·	800 m	MPC · JPL
302147	2001 SF_{114}	—	September 20, 2001	Desert Eagle	W. K. Y. Yeung	·	730 m	MPC · JPL
302148	2001 SV_{118}	—	September 16, 2001	Socorro	LINEAR	·	2.3 km	MPC · JPL
302149	2001 SR_{157}	—	September 17, 2001	Socorro	LINEAR	(16286)	2.8 km	MPC · JPL
302150	2001 SZ_{181}	—	September 19, 2001	Socorro	LINEAR	·	640 m	MPC · JPL
302151	2001 SQ_{201}	—	September 19, 2001	Socorro	LINEAR	·	590 m	MPC · JPL
302152	2001 SW_{220}	—	September 19, 2001	Socorro	LINEAR	·	2.0 km	MPC · JPL
302153	2001 SL_{221}	—	September 19, 2001	Socorro	LINEAR	KOR	1.6 km	MPC · JPL
302154	2001 SQ_{229}	—	September 19, 2001	Socorro	LINEAR	·	960 m	MPC · JPL
302155	2001 SK_{247}	—	September 19, 2001	Socorro	LINEAR	·	690 m	MPC · JPL
302156	2001 SF_{286}	—	September 27, 2001	Socorro	LINEAR	APO	560 m	MPC · JPL
302157	2001 SF_{301}	—	September 20, 2001	Socorro	LINEAR	·	1.8 km	MPC · JPL
302158	2001 SN_{317}	—	September 19, 2001	Socorro	LINEAR	·	650 m	MPC · JPL
302159	2001 SV_{319}	—	September 21, 2001	Socorro	LINEAR	·	740 m	MPC · JPL
302160	2001 SA_{320}	—	September 21, 2001	Socorro	LINEAR	·	930 m	MPC · JPL
302161	2001 SH_{322}	—	September 25, 2001	Socorro	LINEAR	·	750 m	MPC · JPL
302162	2001 SL_{333}	—	September 19, 2001	Socorro	LINEAR	·	850 m	MPC · JPL
302163	2001 SM_{346}	—	September 25, 2001	Socorro	LINEAR	BRA	1.8 km	MPC · JPL
302164	2001 SS_{346}	—	September 25, 2001	Socorro	LINEAR	·	730 m	MPC · JPL
302165	2001 ST_{351}	—	September 18, 2001	Apache Point	SDSS	·	3.2 km	MPC · JPL
302166	2001 TM_{3}	—	October 7, 2001	Palomar	NEAT	·	690 m	MPC · JPL
302167	2001 TS_{14}	—	October 7, 2001	Palomar	NEAT	·	860 m	MPC · JPL
302168	2001 TJ_{23}	—	October 14, 2001	Socorro	LINEAR	·	790 m	MPC · JPL
302169	2001 TD_{45}	—	October 15, 2001	Socorro	LINEAR	ATE · PHA	360 m	MPC · JPL
302170	2001 TG_{46}	—	October 15, 2001	Socorro	LINEAR	H	570 m	MPC · JPL
302171	2001 TJ_{51}	—	October 13, 2001	Socorro	LINEAR	·	860 m	MPC · JPL
302172	2001 TZ_{56}	—	October 10, 2001	Palomar	NEAT	·	1.1 km	MPC · JPL
302173	2001 TS_{59}	—	October 13, 2001	Socorro	LINEAR	·	780 m	MPC · JPL
302174	2001 TD_{60}	—	October 13, 2001	Socorro	LINEAR	·	4.1 km	MPC · JPL
302175	2001 TC_{88}	—	October 14, 2001	Socorro	LINEAR	·	1.7 km	MPC · JPL
302176	2001 TG_{95}	—	October 14, 2001	Socorro	LINEAR	·	1.2 km	MPC · JPL
302177	2001 TP_{108}	—	October 14, 2001	Socorro	LINEAR	·	730 m	MPC · JPL
302178	2001 TD_{115}	—	October 14, 2001	Socorro	LINEAR	·	3.5 km	MPC · JPL
302179	2001 TF_{122}	—	October 15, 2001	Socorro	LINEAR	·	1.0 km	MPC · JPL
302180	2001 TX_{127}	—	October 10, 2001	Palomar	NEAT	·	860 m	MPC · JPL
302181	2001 TY_{129}	—	October 15, 2001	Kitt Peak	Spacewatch	·	990 m	MPC · JPL
302182	2001 TF_{132}	—	October 11, 2001	Palomar	NEAT	·	690 m	MPC · JPL
302183	2001 TE_{163}	—	October 11, 2001	Palomar	NEAT	·	2.5 km	MPC · JPL
302184	2001 TN_{172}	—	October 13, 2001	Socorro	LINEAR	·	900 m	MPC · JPL
302185	2001 TO_{176}	—	October 14, 2001	Socorro	LINEAR	BRA	1.9 km	MPC · JPL
302186	2001 TA_{186}	—	October 14, 2001	Socorro	LINEAR	·	900 m	MPC · JPL
302187	2001 TT_{234}	—	October 15, 2001	Kitt Peak	Spacewatch	·	1.8 km	MPC · JPL
302188	2001 TK_{243}	—	October 14, 2001	Apache Point	SDSS	·	1.7 km	MPC · JPL
302189	2001 TE_{245}	—	October 14, 2001	Apache Point	SDSS	·	1.7 km	MPC · JPL
302190	2001 TR_{251}	—	October 14, 2001	Apache Point	SDSS	·	610 m	MPC · JPL
302191	2001 TH_{252}	—	October 14, 2001	Apache Point	SDSS	·	3.2 km	MPC · JPL
302192	2001 TU_{252}	—	October 14, 2001	Apache Point	SDSS	·	2.1 km	MPC · JPL
302193	2001 UA	—	October 16, 2001	Palomar	NEAT	·	780 m	MPC · JPL
302194	2001 UW_{26}	—	October 18, 2001	Kitt Peak	Spacewatch	·	1.2 km	MPC · JPL
302195	2001 UU_{45}	—	October 17, 2001	Socorro	LINEAR	·	900 m	MPC · JPL
302196	2001 UC_{57}	—	October 17, 2001	Socorro	LINEAR	·	3.2 km	MPC · JPL
302197	2001 UA_{64}	—	October 18, 2001	Socorro	LINEAR	·	790 m	MPC · JPL
302198	2001 UB_{64}	—	October 18, 2001	Socorro	LINEAR	BRA	2.4 km	MPC · JPL
302199	2001 UB_{74}	—	October 17, 2001	Socorro	LINEAR	·	880 m	MPC · JPL
302200	2001 UG_{82}	—	October 20, 2001	Socorro	LINEAR	·	810 m	MPC · JPL

== 302201–302300 ==
back to top

Designation			Discovery			Properties		Ref
Permanent	Provisional	Named after	Date	Site	Discoverer(s)	Category	Diam.	Ref
302201	2001 UG_{87}	—	October 18, 2001	Kitt Peak	Spacewatch	·	2.8 km	MPC · JPL
302202	2001 UJ_{106}	—	October 20, 2001	Socorro	LINEAR	·	640 m	MPC · JPL
302203	2001 UQ_{111}	—	October 21, 2001	Socorro	LINEAR	·	810 m	MPC · JPL
302204	2001 UB_{121}	—	October 22, 2001	Socorro	LINEAR	·	920 m	MPC · JPL
302205	2001 UM_{133}	—	October 21, 2001	Socorro	LINEAR	·	800 m	MPC · JPL
302206	2001 UJ_{138}	—	October 23, 2001	Socorro	LINEAR	·	730 m	MPC · JPL
302207	2001 UN_{142}	—	October 23, 2001	Socorro	LINEAR	·	680 m	MPC · JPL
302208	2001 UV_{145}	—	October 23, 2001	Socorro	LINEAR	·	2.1 km	MPC · JPL
302209	2001 UP_{148}	—	October 23, 2001	Socorro	LINEAR	EOS	2.1 km	MPC · JPL
302210	2001 UW_{148}	—	October 23, 2001	Socorro	LINEAR	·	2.7 km	MPC · JPL
302211	2001 UM_{159}	—	October 23, 2001	Socorro	LINEAR	·	1.1 km	MPC · JPL
302212	2001 UY_{169}	—	October 21, 2001	Socorro	LINEAR	·	2.8 km	MPC · JPL
302213	2001 UT_{173}	—	October 18, 2001	Palomar	NEAT	·	990 m	MPC · JPL
302214	2001 UR_{176}	—	October 25, 2001	Kitt Peak	Spacewatch	·	710 m	MPC · JPL
302215	2001 UA_{191}	—	October 18, 2001	Kitt Peak	Spacewatch	·	2.3 km	MPC · JPL
302216	2001 UD_{199}	—	October 19, 2001	Palomar	NEAT	·	1.8 km	MPC · JPL
302217	2001 UA_{207}	—	October 20, 2001	Socorro	LINEAR	·	930 m	MPC · JPL
302218	2001 UX_{217}	—	October 24, 2001	Kitt Peak	Spacewatch	KOR	1.7 km	MPC · JPL
302219	2001 UH_{222}	—	October 16, 2001	Kitt Peak	Spacewatch	·	3.9 km	MPC · JPL
302220	2001 UD_{227}	—	October 16, 2001	Palomar	NEAT	fast	2.5 km	MPC · JPL
302221	2001 VO_{10}	—	November 10, 2001	Socorro	LINEAR	AEG	3.9 km	MPC · JPL
302222	2001 VQ_{30}	—	November 9, 2001	Socorro	LINEAR	·	1.3 km	MPC · JPL
302223	2001 VU_{31}	—	November 9, 2001	Socorro	LINEAR	·	980 m	MPC · JPL
302224	2001 VG_{59}	—	November 10, 2001	Socorro	LINEAR	·	1.0 km	MPC · JPL
302225	2001 VV_{81}	—	November 10, 2001	Socorro	LINEAR	PHO	2.3 km	MPC · JPL
302226	2001 VU_{85}	—	November 12, 2001	Socorro	LINEAR	·	930 m	MPC · JPL
302227	2001 VT_{93}	—	November 15, 2001	Socorro	LINEAR	fast	2.5 km	MPC · JPL
302228	2001 VO_{102}	—	November 12, 2001	Socorro	LINEAR	·	770 m	MPC · JPL
302229	2001 VH_{113}	—	November 12, 2001	Socorro	LINEAR	·	3.0 km	MPC · JPL
302230	2001 VR_{128}	—	November 11, 2001	Apache Point	SDSS	·	2.2 km	MPC · JPL
302231	2001 WW_{4}	—	November 20, 2001	Socorro	LINEAR	H	670 m	MPC · JPL
302232	2001 WJ_{5}	—	November 21, 2001	Socorro	LINEAR	PHO	1.9 km	MPC · JPL
302233	2001 WS_{7}	—	November 17, 2001	Socorro	LINEAR	·	860 m	MPC · JPL
302234	2001 WB_{24}	—	November 17, 2001	Kitt Peak	Spacewatch	KOR	1.7 km	MPC · JPL
302235	2001 WF_{26}	—	November 17, 2001	Socorro	LINEAR	·	970 m	MPC · JPL
302236	2001 WK_{32}	—	November 17, 2001	Socorro	LINEAR	·	3.3 km	MPC · JPL
302237	2001 WF_{33}	—	November 17, 2001	Socorro	LINEAR	·	990 m	MPC · JPL
302238	2001 WP_{42}	—	November 18, 2001	Socorro	LINEAR	EOS	1.9 km	MPC · JPL
302239	2001 WV_{59}	—	November 19, 2001	Socorro	LINEAR	·	2.2 km	MPC · JPL
302240	2001 WY_{59}	—	November 19, 2001	Socorro	LINEAR	·	950 m	MPC · JPL
302241	2001 WV_{72}	—	November 20, 2001	Socorro	LINEAR	·	850 m	MPC · JPL
302242	2001 WL_{98}	—	November 19, 2001	Anderson Mesa	LONEOS	·	870 m	MPC · JPL
302243	2001 WK_{100}	—	November 16, 2001	Kitt Peak	Spacewatch	·	860 m	MPC · JPL
302244	2001 WN_{100}	—	November 16, 2001	Kitt Peak	Spacewatch	·	770 m	MPC · JPL
302245	2001 WC_{104}	—	November 21, 2001	Apache Point	SDSS	·	2.5 km	MPC · JPL
302246	2001 XY_{3}	—	December 9, 2001	Socorro	LINEAR	H	670 m	MPC · JPL
302247	2001 XW_{6}	—	December 9, 2001	Socorro	LINEAR	H	690 m	MPC · JPL
302248	2001 XV_{31}	—	December 10, 2001	Kitt Peak	Spacewatch	·	840 m	MPC · JPL
302249	2001 XP_{32}	—	December 10, 2001	Kitt Peak	Spacewatch	·	2.2 km	MPC · JPL
302250	2001 XD_{33}	—	December 10, 2001	Kitt Peak	Spacewatch	H	720 m	MPC · JPL
302251	2001 XD_{49}	—	December 10, 2001	Socorro	LINEAR	·	920 m	MPC · JPL
302252	2001 XK_{70}	—	December 11, 2001	Socorro	LINEAR	EOS	2.4 km	MPC · JPL
302253	2001 XU_{75}	—	December 11, 2001	Socorro	LINEAR	·	2.9 km	MPC · JPL
302254	2001 XC_{84}	—	December 11, 2001	Socorro	LINEAR	PHO	1.4 km	MPC · JPL
302255	2001 XG_{93}	—	December 10, 2001	Socorro	LINEAR	·	2.5 km	MPC · JPL
302256	2001 XF_{96}	—	December 10, 2001	Socorro	LINEAR	·	1.1 km	MPC · JPL
302257	2001 XT_{103}	—	December 14, 2001	Socorro	LINEAR	H	870 m	MPC · JPL
302258	2001 XX_{108}	—	December 10, 2001	Socorro	LINEAR	·	1.4 km	MPC · JPL
302259	2001 XJ_{112}	—	December 11, 2001	Socorro	LINEAR	·	4.8 km	MPC · JPL
302260	2001 XS_{120}	—	December 14, 2001	Socorro	LINEAR	EOS	2.5 km	MPC · JPL
302261	2001 XC_{122}	—	December 14, 2001	Socorro	LINEAR	·	920 m	MPC · JPL
302262	2001 XM_{123}	—	December 14, 2001	Socorro	LINEAR	EOS	2.4 km	MPC · JPL
302263	2001 XJ_{126}	—	December 14, 2001	Socorro	LINEAR	·	1.2 km	MPC · JPL
302264	2001 XE_{131}	—	December 14, 2001	Socorro	LINEAR	·	2.4 km	MPC · JPL
302265	2001 XB_{138}	—	December 14, 2001	Socorro	LINEAR	·	670 m	MPC · JPL
302266	2001 XN_{146}	—	December 14, 2001	Socorro	LINEAR	·	1.1 km	MPC · JPL
302267	2001 XZ_{149}	—	December 14, 2001	Socorro	LINEAR	·	3.2 km	MPC · JPL
302268	2001 XM_{151}	—	December 14, 2001	Socorro	LINEAR	·	780 m	MPC · JPL
302269	2001 XB_{153}	—	December 14, 2001	Socorro	LINEAR	·	2.6 km	MPC · JPL
302270	2001 XZ_{162}	—	December 14, 2001	Socorro	LINEAR	·	800 m	MPC · JPL
302271	2001 XC_{175}	—	December 14, 2001	Socorro	LINEAR	·	2.1 km	MPC · JPL
302272	2001 XY_{175}	—	December 14, 2001	Socorro	LINEAR	·	2.0 km	MPC · JPL
302273	2001 XD_{177}	—	December 14, 2001	Socorro	LINEAR	·	5.2 km	MPC · JPL
302274	2001 XQ_{184}	—	December 14, 2001	Socorro	LINEAR	(2076)	870 m	MPC · JPL
302275	2001 XP_{186}	—	December 14, 2001	Socorro	LINEAR	·	1.0 km	MPC · JPL
302276	2001 XM_{192}	—	December 14, 2001	Socorro	LINEAR	V	1.0 km	MPC · JPL
302277	2001 XS_{198}	—	December 14, 2001	Socorro	LINEAR	·	4.1 km	MPC · JPL
302278	2001 XO_{222}	—	December 15, 2001	Socorro	LINEAR	·	980 m	MPC · JPL
302279	2001 XT_{223}	—	December 15, 2001	Socorro	LINEAR	·	1.1 km	MPC · JPL
302280	2001 XC_{229}	—	December 15, 2001	Socorro	LINEAR	·	1.3 km	MPC · JPL
302281	2001 XC_{233}	—	December 15, 2001	Socorro	LINEAR	EOS	2.3 km	MPC · JPL
302282	2001 XL_{235}	—	December 15, 2001	Socorro	LINEAR	·	800 m	MPC · JPL
302283	2001 XN_{241}	—	December 14, 2001	Socorro	LINEAR	EOS	2.3 km	MPC · JPL
302284	2001 XG_{247}	—	December 15, 2001	Socorro	LINEAR	·	1.8 km	MPC · JPL
302285	2001 XS_{252}	—	December 14, 2001	Socorro	LINEAR	·	2.1 km	MPC · JPL
302286	2001 XW_{260}	—	December 10, 2001	Socorro	LINEAR	·	3.5 km	MPC · JPL
302287	2001 YQ_{1}	—	December 18, 2001	Socorro	LINEAR	H	820 m	MPC · JPL
302288	2001 YO_{19}	—	December 17, 2001	Socorro	LINEAR	·	900 m	MPC · JPL
302289	2001 YF_{28}	—	December 18, 2001	Socorro	LINEAR	KOR	1.7 km	MPC · JPL
302290	2001 YD_{31}	—	December 18, 2001	Socorro	LINEAR	·	2.0 km	MPC · JPL
302291	2001 YS_{31}	—	December 18, 2001	Socorro	LINEAR	·	810 m	MPC · JPL
302292	2001 YV_{31}	—	December 18, 2001	Socorro	LINEAR	·	4.8 km	MPC · JPL
302293	2001 YZ_{54}	—	December 18, 2001	Socorro	LINEAR	·	940 m	MPC · JPL
302294	2001 YH_{68}	—	December 18, 2001	Socorro	LINEAR	·	4.2 km	MPC · JPL
302295	2001 YN_{71}	—	December 18, 2001	Socorro	LINEAR	·	3.6 km	MPC · JPL
302296	2001 YP_{79}	—	December 18, 2001	Socorro	LINEAR	·	2.0 km	MPC · JPL
302297	2001 YJ_{80}	—	December 18, 2001	Socorro	LINEAR	·	1.1 km	MPC · JPL
302298	2001 YM_{81}	—	December 18, 2001	Socorro	LINEAR	·	890 m	MPC · JPL
302299	2001 YV_{83}	—	December 18, 2001	Socorro	LINEAR	·	5.1 km	MPC · JPL
302300	2001 YK_{88}	—	December 18, 2001	Socorro	LINEAR	·	800 m	MPC · JPL

== 302301–302400 ==
back to top

Designation			Discovery			Properties		Ref
Permanent	Provisional	Named after	Date	Site	Discoverer(s)	Category	Diam.	Ref
302301	2001 YN_{94}	—	December 19, 2001	Kitt Peak	Spacewatch	·	3.2 km	MPC · JPL
302302	2001 YH_{100}	—	December 17, 2001	Socorro	LINEAR	·	3.2 km	MPC · JPL
302303	2001 YF_{109}	—	December 18, 2001	Socorro	LINEAR	·	5.3 km	MPC · JPL
302304	2001 YS_{111}	—	December 18, 2001	Anderson Mesa	LONEOS	·	1.1 km	MPC · JPL
302305	2001 YN_{121}	—	December 17, 2001	Socorro	LINEAR	·	980 m	MPC · JPL
302306	2001 YE_{129}	—	December 17, 2001	Socorro	LINEAR	·	840 m	MPC · JPL
302307	2001 YO_{132}	—	December 20, 2001	Socorro	LINEAR	·	3.0 km	MPC · JPL
302308	2001 YU_{149}	—	December 19, 2001	Palomar	NEAT	·	4.5 km	MPC · JPL
302309	2001 YT_{158}	—	December 18, 2001	Apache Point	SDSS	·	720 m	MPC · JPL
302310	2001 YZ_{160}	—	December 16, 2001	Palomar	NEAT	·	3.3 km	MPC · JPL
302311	2002 AA	—	January 3, 2002	Socorro	LINEAR	APO	470 m	MPC · JPL
302312	2002 AX_{5}	—	January 9, 2002	Socorro	LINEAR	H	1.4 km	MPC · JPL
302313	2002 AK_{9}	—	January 11, 2002	Desert Eagle	W. K. Y. Yeung	·	1.7 km	MPC · JPL
302314	2002 AE_{32}	—	January 8, 2002	Haleakala	NEAT	·	3.4 km	MPC · JPL
302315	2002 AN_{45}	—	January 9, 2002	Socorro	LINEAR	·	2.9 km	MPC · JPL
302316	2002 AF_{47}	—	January 9, 2002	Socorro	LINEAR	·	4.2 km	MPC · JPL
302317	2002 AS_{47}	—	January 9, 2002	Socorro	LINEAR	·	3.9 km	MPC · JPL
302318	2002 AE_{48}	—	January 9, 2002	Socorro	LINEAR	·	890 m	MPC · JPL
302319	2002 AM_{54}	—	January 9, 2002	Socorro	LINEAR	EOS	2.6 km	MPC · JPL
302320	2002 AR_{58}	—	January 9, 2002	Socorro	LINEAR	·	1.4 km	MPC · JPL
302321	2002 AO_{60}	—	January 9, 2002	Socorro	LINEAR	THB	4.3 km	MPC · JPL
302322	2002 AE_{67}	—	January 9, 2002	Campo Imperatore	CINEOS	·	3.3 km	MPC · JPL
302323	2002 AW_{72}	—	January 8, 2002	Socorro	LINEAR	EOS	2.5 km	MPC · JPL
302324	2002 AQ_{75}	—	December 19, 2001	Socorro	LINEAR	·	2.9 km	MPC · JPL
302325	2002 AX_{75}	—	January 8, 2002	Socorro	LINEAR	·	1.0 km	MPC · JPL
302326	2002 AB_{76}	—	January 8, 2002	Socorro	LINEAR	·	690 m	MPC · JPL
302327	2002 AS_{76}	—	January 8, 2002	Socorro	LINEAR	·	3.9 km	MPC · JPL
302328	2002 AA_{79}	—	January 8, 2002	Socorro	LINEAR	EOS	2.4 km	MPC · JPL
302329	2002 AD_{88}	—	January 9, 2002	Socorro	LINEAR	HYG	3.4 km	MPC · JPL
302330	2002 AM_{89}	—	January 9, 2002	Socorro	LINEAR	·	1.3 km	MPC · JPL
302331	2002 AF_{95}	—	January 8, 2002	Socorro	LINEAR	·	3.2 km	MPC · JPL
302332	2002 AX_{100}	—	January 8, 2002	Socorro	LINEAR	·	860 m	MPC · JPL
302333	2002 AE_{101}	—	January 8, 2002	Socorro	LINEAR	·	880 m	MPC · JPL
302334	2002 AT_{104}	—	January 9, 2002	Socorro	LINEAR	(2076)	900 m	MPC · JPL
302335	2002 AW_{104}	—	January 9, 2002	Socorro	LINEAR	(2076)	810 m	MPC · JPL
302336	2002 AX_{110}	—	January 9, 2002	Socorro	LINEAR	·	3.2 km	MPC · JPL
302337	2002 AV_{117}	—	January 9, 2002	Socorro	LINEAR	TIR	4.7 km	MPC · JPL
302338	2002 AU_{119}	—	January 9, 2002	Socorro	LINEAR	·	3.1 km	MPC · JPL
302339	2002 AB_{130}	—	January 15, 2002	Kingsnake	J. V. McClusky	H	850 m	MPC · JPL
302340	2002 AG_{135}	—	January 9, 2002	Socorro	LINEAR	·	3.7 km	MPC · JPL
302341	2002 AT_{138}	—	January 9, 2002	Socorro	LINEAR	·	3.4 km	MPC · JPL
302342	2002 AY_{138}	—	January 9, 2002	Socorro	LINEAR	·	3.9 km	MPC · JPL
302343	2002 AL_{142}	—	January 13, 2002	Socorro	LINEAR	·	670 m	MPC · JPL
302344	2002 AG_{148}	—	January 13, 2002	Palomar	NEAT	·	4.3 km	MPC · JPL
302345	2002 AC_{158}	—	January 13, 2002	Socorro	LINEAR	NYS	1.5 km	MPC · JPL
302346	2002 AJ_{172}	—	January 14, 2002	Socorro	LINEAR	NYS	980 m	MPC · JPL
302347	2002 AV_{173}	—	January 14, 2002	Socorro	LINEAR	·	2.8 km	MPC · JPL
302348	2002 AS_{174}	—	January 14, 2002	Socorro	LINEAR	·	890 m	MPC · JPL
302349	2002 AT_{174}	—	January 14, 2002	Socorro	LINEAR	EOS	3.0 km	MPC · JPL
302350	2002 AW_{181}	—	January 5, 2002	Kitt Peak	Spacewatch	·	750 m	MPC · JPL
302351	2002 AT_{203}	—	January 12, 2002	Kitt Peak	Spacewatch	·	3.5 km	MPC · JPL
302352	2002 BM_{2}	—	January 19, 2002	Kitt Peak	Spacewatch	·	2.9 km	MPC · JPL
302353	2002 BH_{3}	—	January 18, 2002	Anderson Mesa	LONEOS	·	1.1 km	MPC · JPL
302354	2002 BZ_{3}	—	January 18, 2002	Anderson Mesa	LONEOS	PHO	1.8 km	MPC · JPL
302355	2002 BB_{13}	—	January 18, 2002	Socorro	LINEAR	·	3.5 km	MPC · JPL
302356	2002 BP_{18}	—	January 21, 2002	Socorro	LINEAR	·	1.3 km	MPC · JPL
302357	2002 BE_{26}	—	January 26, 2002	Socorro	LINEAR	PHO	1.3 km	MPC · JPL
302358	2002 BY_{26}	—	January 17, 2002	Palomar	NEAT	·	4.8 km	MPC · JPL
302359	2002 BR_{29}	—	January 20, 2002	Anderson Mesa	LONEOS	·	1.9 km	MPC · JPL
302360	2002 BO_{31}	—	January 19, 2002	Anderson Mesa	LONEOS	·	4.3 km	MPC · JPL
302361	2002 BQ_{31}	—	January 22, 2002	Kitt Peak	Spacewatch	·	3.7 km	MPC · JPL
302362	2002 BE_{32}	—	January 19, 2002	Anderson Mesa	LONEOS	·	3.7 km	MPC · JPL
302363	2002 CC	—	February 1, 2002	Socorro	LINEAR	T_{j} (2.9)	4.2 km	MPC · JPL
302364	2002 CX_{1}	—	February 3, 2002	Palomar	NEAT	·	3.2 km	MPC · JPL
302365	2002 CD_{9}	—	February 6, 2002	Kitt Peak	Spacewatch	VER	3.0 km	MPC · JPL
302366	2002 CJ_{10}	—	February 6, 2002	Socorro	LINEAR	·	2.3 km	MPC · JPL
302367	2002 CV_{12}	—	February 8, 2002	Fountain Hills	C. W. Juels, P. R. Holvorcem	·	2.4 km	MPC · JPL
302368	2002 CM_{19}	—	February 4, 2002	Palomar	NEAT	·	2.8 km	MPC · JPL
302369	2002 CA_{21}	—	February 4, 2002	Palomar	NEAT	TIR	4.0 km	MPC · JPL
302370	2002 CJ_{21}	—	February 5, 2002	Palomar	NEAT	·	930 m	MPC · JPL
302371	2002 CQ_{21}	—	February 5, 2002	Palomar	NEAT	·	3.4 km	MPC · JPL
302372	2002 CF_{22}	—	February 5, 2002	Palomar	NEAT	·	3.4 km	MPC · JPL
302373	2002 CP_{28}	—	February 6, 2002	Socorro	LINEAR	·	3.1 km	MPC · JPL
302374	2002 CE_{41}	—	February 7, 2002	Palomar	NEAT	·	3.7 km	MPC · JPL
302375	2002 CF_{41}	—	February 7, 2002	Palomar	NEAT	H	820 m	MPC · JPL
302376	2002 CG_{43}	—	February 12, 2002	Fountain Hills	C. W. Juels, P. R. Holvorcem	·	2.8 km	MPC · JPL
302377	2002 CS_{43}	—	February 8, 2002	Socorro	LINEAR	H	830 m	MPC · JPL
302378	2002 CY_{45}	—	February 8, 2002	Palomar	NEAT	·	5.0 km	MPC · JPL
302379	2002 CT_{50}	—	February 12, 2002	Desert Eagle	W. K. Y. Yeung	·	3.7 km	MPC · JPL
302380	2002 CZ_{56}	—	February 7, 2002	Socorro	LINEAR	T_{j} (2.94)	4.7 km	MPC · JPL
302381	2002 CL_{58}	—	February 11, 2002	Socorro	LINEAR	H	740 m	MPC · JPL
302382	2002 CD_{64}	—	February 6, 2002	Socorro	LINEAR	·	4.5 km	MPC · JPL
302383	2002 CG_{64}	—	February 6, 2002	Socorro	LINEAR	·	3.6 km	MPC · JPL
302384	2002 CO_{64}	—	February 6, 2002	Socorro	LINEAR	LIX	6.5 km	MPC · JPL
302385	2002 CA_{65}	—	February 6, 2002	Socorro	LINEAR	·	4.6 km	MPC · JPL
302386	2002 CU_{70}	—	February 7, 2002	Socorro	LINEAR	·	3.6 km	MPC · JPL
302387	2002 CK_{75}	—	February 7, 2002	Socorro	LINEAR	MAS	840 m	MPC · JPL
302388	2002 CL_{75}	—	February 7, 2002	Socorro	LINEAR	V	860 m	MPC · JPL
302389	2002 CR_{77}	—	February 7, 2002	Socorro	LINEAR	·	3.6 km	MPC · JPL
302390	2002 CZ_{79}	—	February 7, 2002	Socorro	LINEAR	V	820 m	MPC · JPL
302391	2002 CR_{80}	—	February 7, 2002	Socorro	LINEAR	·	2.3 km	MPC · JPL
302392	2002 CA_{81}	—	February 7, 2002	Socorro	LINEAR	·	1.2 km	MPC · JPL
302393	2002 CF_{88}	—	February 7, 2002	Socorro	LINEAR	·	1.8 km	MPC · JPL
302394	2002 CF_{89}	—	February 7, 2002	Socorro	LINEAR	·	3.2 km	MPC · JPL
302395	2002 CS_{91}	—	February 7, 2002	Socorro	LINEAR	NYS	1.4 km	MPC · JPL
302396	2002 CN_{93}	—	February 7, 2002	Socorro	LINEAR	·	3.0 km	MPC · JPL
302397	2002 CC_{97}	—	February 7, 2002	Socorro	LINEAR	·	980 m	MPC · JPL
302398	2002 CC_{101}	—	February 7, 2002	Socorro	LINEAR	·	1.8 km	MPC · JPL
302399	2002 CK_{103}	—	February 7, 2002	Socorro	LINEAR	PHO	1.1 km	MPC · JPL
302400	2002 CL_{104}	—	February 7, 2002	Socorro	LINEAR	·	2.8 km	MPC · JPL

== 302401–302500 ==
back to top

Designation			Discovery			Properties		Ref
Permanent	Provisional	Named after	Date	Site	Discoverer(s)	Category	Diam.	Ref
302401	2002 CG_{105}	—	February 7, 2002	Socorro	LINEAR	·	1.9 km	MPC · JPL
302402	2002 CL_{113}	—	February 8, 2002	Socorro	LINEAR	·	4.3 km	MPC · JPL
302403	2002 CD_{123}	—	February 7, 2002	Socorro	LINEAR	·	870 m	MPC · JPL
302404	2002 CS_{123}	—	February 7, 2002	Socorro	LINEAR	·	3.6 km	MPC · JPL
302405	2002 CD_{133}	—	February 7, 2002	Socorro	LINEAR	·	1.1 km	MPC · JPL
302406	2002 CR_{153}	—	February 8, 2002	Kitt Peak	Spacewatch	NYS	1.1 km	MPC · JPL
302407	2002 CX_{155}	—	February 6, 2002	Socorro	LINEAR	·	4.8 km	MPC · JPL
302408	2002 CM_{156}	—	February 7, 2002	Socorro	LINEAR	·	740 m	MPC · JPL
302409	2002 CS_{156}	—	February 7, 2002	Socorro	LINEAR	·	1.5 km	MPC · JPL
302410	2002 CG_{162}	—	February 8, 2002	Socorro	LINEAR	NYS	1.5 km	MPC · JPL
302411	2002 CL_{177}	—	February 10, 2002	Socorro	LINEAR	·	4.0 km	MPC · JPL
302412	2002 CS_{182}	—	February 10, 2002	Socorro	LINEAR	V	980 m	MPC · JPL
302413	2002 CW_{196}	—	February 10, 2002	Socorro	LINEAR	·	1.2 km	MPC · JPL
302414	2002 CJ_{197}	—	February 10, 2002	Socorro	LINEAR	·	2.8 km	MPC · JPL
302415	2002 CF_{206}	—	February 10, 2002	Socorro	LINEAR	·	2.0 km	MPC · JPL
302416	2002 CG_{212}	—	February 10, 2002	Socorro	LINEAR	·	950 m	MPC · JPL
302417	2002 CA_{215}	—	February 10, 2002	Socorro	LINEAR	·	3.1 km	MPC · JPL
302418	2002 CH_{217}	—	February 10, 2002	Socorro	LINEAR	·	1.5 km	MPC · JPL
302419	2002 CZ_{221}	—	February 11, 2002	Socorro	LINEAR	·	2.7 km	MPC · JPL
302420	2002 CV_{228}	—	February 6, 2002	Kitt Peak	Spacewatch	·	1.2 km	MPC · JPL
302421	2002 CU_{230}	—	February 14, 2002	Cerro Tololo	Deep Lens Survey	·	3.1 km	MPC · JPL
302422	2002 CU_{248}	—	February 14, 2002	Haleakala	NEAT	·	3.4 km	MPC · JPL
302423	2002 CD_{249}	—	February 14, 2002	Kitt Peak	Spacewatch	CYB	3.7 km	MPC · JPL
302424	2002 CH_{256}	—	February 4, 2002	Palomar	NEAT	·	3.2 km	MPC · JPL
302425	2002 CP_{282}	—	February 8, 2002	Kitt Peak	Spacewatch	·	2.8 km	MPC · JPL
302426	2002 CP_{293}	—	February 11, 2002	Socorro	LINEAR	·	1.4 km	MPC · JPL
302427	2002 CB_{296}	—	February 10, 2002	Socorro	LINEAR	THM	2.5 km	MPC · JPL
302428	2002 CL_{297}	—	February 11, 2002	Socorro	LINEAR	·	3.9 km	MPC · JPL
302429	2002 CU_{297}	—	February 11, 2002	Socorro	LINEAR	·	920 m	MPC · JPL
302430	2002 CL_{303}	—	February 12, 2002	Socorro	LINEAR	HYG	3.3 km	MPC · JPL
302431	2002 CW_{305}	—	February 3, 2002	Palomar	NEAT	·	1.7 km	MPC · JPL
302432	2002 CR_{317}	—	August 28, 2005	Kitt Peak	Spacewatch	·	4.0 km	MPC · JPL
302433	2002 DZ_{9}	—	February 19, 2002	Socorro	LINEAR	·	4.1 km	MPC · JPL
302434	2002 DX_{18}	—	February 20, 2002	Socorro	LINEAR	·	1.4 km	MPC · JPL
302435	2002 DD_{19}	—	February 18, 2002	Cima Ekar	ADAS	V	700 m	MPC · JPL
302436	2002 EZ_{8}	—	March 13, 2002	Socorro	LINEAR	H	660 m	MPC · JPL
302437	2002 EV_{18}	—	March 9, 2002	Kitt Peak	Spacewatch	·	1.7 km	MPC · JPL
302438	2002 EF_{24}	—	March 5, 2002	Kitt Peak	Spacewatch	·	2.7 km	MPC · JPL
302439	2002 EF_{29}	—	March 9, 2002	Socorro	LINEAR	TIR	4.0 km	MPC · JPL
302440	2002 EQ_{40}	—	March 9, 2002	Socorro	LINEAR	·	1.8 km	MPC · JPL
302441	2002 EB_{41}	—	March 10, 2002	Socorro	LINEAR	·	1.5 km	MPC · JPL
302442	2002 ES_{41}	—	March 12, 2002	Socorro	LINEAR	V	840 m	MPC · JPL
302443	2002 EM_{55}	—	March 13, 2002	Socorro	LINEAR	·	3.0 km	MPC · JPL
302444	2002 EF_{64}	—	March 13, 2002	Socorro	LINEAR	·	1.1 km	MPC · JPL
302445	2002 EC_{65}	—	March 13, 2002	Socorro	LINEAR	·	1.4 km	MPC · JPL
302446	2002 EF_{67}	—	March 13, 2002	Socorro	LINEAR	NYS	1.3 km	MPC · JPL
302447	2002 EH_{71}	—	March 13, 2002	Socorro	LINEAR	·	1.5 km	MPC · JPL
302448	2002 EF_{83}	—	March 13, 2002	Palomar	NEAT	MAS	850 m	MPC · JPL
302449	2002 EB_{91}	—	March 12, 2002	Socorro	LINEAR	HYG	4.1 km	MPC · JPL
302450	2002 EH_{91}	—	March 12, 2002	Socorro	LINEAR	NYS	1.3 km	MPC · JPL
302451	2002 EA_{95}	—	March 14, 2002	Socorro	LINEAR	NYS	980 m	MPC · JPL
302452	2002 EU_{95}	—	March 14, 2002	Socorro	LINEAR	TIR	3.1 km	MPC · JPL
302453	2002 ET_{99}	—	March 4, 2002	Catalina	CSS	·	1.9 km	MPC · JPL
302454	2002 EY_{100}	—	March 6, 2002	Socorro	LINEAR	·	1.1 km	MPC · JPL
302455	2002 EM_{101}	—	March 6, 2002	Palomar	NEAT	·	3.9 km	MPC · JPL
302456	2002 ER_{111}	—	March 9, 2002	Catalina	CSS	·	1.5 km	MPC · JPL
302457	2002 EB_{112}	—	March 9, 2002	Kitt Peak	Spacewatch	·	3.5 km	MPC · JPL
302458	2002 EE_{114}	—	March 10, 2002	Kitt Peak	Spacewatch	CLA	2.1 km	MPC · JPL
302459	2002 ES_{117}	—	March 10, 2002	Kitt Peak	Spacewatch	V	800 m	MPC · JPL
302460	2002 EM_{121}	—	March 11, 2002	Kitt Peak	Spacewatch	·	1.4 km	MPC · JPL
302461	2002 EA_{123}	—	March 12, 2002	Anderson Mesa	LONEOS	·	2.4 km	MPC · JPL
302462	2002 EL_{125}	—	March 12, 2002	Palomar	NEAT	V	910 m	MPC · JPL
302463	2002 EB_{128}	—	March 12, 2002	Palomar	NEAT	·	4.3 km	MPC · JPL
302464	2002 ET_{130}	—	March 12, 2002	Kitt Peak	Spacewatch	HYG	3.7 km	MPC · JPL
302465	2002 EM_{131}	—	March 13, 2002	Needville	Needville	·	760 m	MPC · JPL
302466	2002 ES_{136}	—	March 12, 2002	Palomar	NEAT	MAS	630 m	MPC · JPL
302467	2002 EB_{143}	—	March 12, 2002	Palomar	NEAT	HYG	3.5 km	MPC · JPL
302468	2002 EL_{145}	—	March 13, 2002	Socorro	LINEAR	·	1.6 km	MPC · JPL
302469	2002 EG_{148}	—	March 15, 2002	Palomar	NEAT	·	1.2 km	MPC · JPL
302470	2002 ED_{155}	—	March 13, 2002	Socorro	LINEAR	·	1.4 km	MPC · JPL
302471	2002 FC_{7}	—	March 31, 2002	Palomar	NEAT	·	6.6 km	MPC · JPL
302472	2002 FC_{12}	—	March 16, 2002	Socorro	LINEAR	·	1.7 km	MPC · JPL
302473	2002 FN_{15}	—	March 16, 2002	Haleakala	NEAT	·	4.7 km	MPC · JPL
302474	2002 FY_{18}	—	March 18, 2002	Kitt Peak	M. W. Buie	·	3.5 km	MPC · JPL
302475	2002 FN_{22}	—	March 19, 2002	Palomar	NEAT	·	6.4 km	MPC · JPL
302476	2002 FH_{24}	—	March 19, 2002	Palomar	NEAT	TIR	4.2 km	MPC · JPL
302477	2002 FT_{31}	—	March 19, 2002	Anderson Mesa	LONEOS	NYS	1.8 km	MPC · JPL
302478	2002 FS_{36}	—	March 23, 2002	Socorro	LINEAR	·	1.4 km	MPC · JPL
302479	2002 GG_{15}	—	April 15, 2002	Socorro	LINEAR	H	680 m	MPC · JPL
302480	2002 GS_{23}	—	April 15, 2002	Palomar	NEAT	·	1.5 km	MPC · JPL
302481	2002 GD_{24}	—	April 15, 2002	Palomar	NEAT	·	1.5 km	MPC · JPL
302482	2002 GK_{25}	—	April 13, 2002	Kitt Peak	Spacewatch	·	3.0 km	MPC · JPL
302483	2002 GL_{41}	—	April 4, 2002	Palomar	NEAT	·	2.0 km	MPC · JPL
302484	2002 GG_{42}	—	April 4, 2002	Palomar	NEAT	·	1.2 km	MPC · JPL
302485	2002 GO_{51}	—	April 5, 2002	Palomar	NEAT	·	1.6 km	MPC · JPL
302486	2002 GP_{61}	—	April 8, 2002	Palomar	NEAT	·	1.4 km	MPC · JPL
302487	2002 GD_{63}	—	April 8, 2002	Palomar	NEAT	MAS	1.2 km	MPC · JPL
302488	2002 GL_{64}	—	April 8, 2002	Palomar	NEAT	·	1.5 km	MPC · JPL
302489	2002 GC_{74}	—	April 9, 2002	Palomar	NEAT	·	1.5 km	MPC · JPL
302490	2002 GW_{77}	—	April 9, 2002	Socorro	LINEAR	·	1.6 km	MPC · JPL
302491	2002 GS_{82}	—	April 10, 2002	Socorro	LINEAR	·	1.5 km	MPC · JPL
302492	2002 GX_{88}	—	April 10, 2002	Socorro	LINEAR	·	1.8 km	MPC · JPL
302493	2002 GB_{90}	—	April 8, 2002	Palomar	NEAT	NYS	1.2 km	MPC · JPL
302494	2002 GV_{94}	—	April 9, 2002	Socorro	LINEAR	·	1.9 km	MPC · JPL
302495	2002 GS_{95}	—	April 9, 2002	Socorro	LINEAR	·	1.5 km	MPC · JPL
302496	2002 GK_{99}	—	April 10, 2002	Socorro	LINEAR	MAS	840 m	MPC · JPL
302497	2002 GR_{113}	—	April 11, 2002	Socorro	LINEAR	·	1.7 km	MPC · JPL
302498	2002 GZ_{116}	—	April 11, 2002	Socorro	LINEAR	·	1.7 km	MPC · JPL
302499	2002 GG_{118}	—	April 12, 2002	Palomar	NEAT	·	1.5 km	MPC · JPL
302500	2002 GY_{123}	—	April 12, 2002	Socorro	LINEAR	·	3.5 km	MPC · JPL

== 302501–302600 ==
back to top

Designation			Discovery			Properties		Ref
Permanent	Provisional	Named after	Date	Site	Discoverer(s)	Category	Diam.	Ref
302501	2002 GN_{126}	—	April 12, 2002	Socorro	LINEAR	·	1.3 km	MPC · JPL
302502	2002 GQ_{128}	—	April 12, 2002	Socorro	LINEAR	·	1.4 km	MPC · JPL
302503	2002 GR_{129}	—	April 12, 2002	Socorro	LINEAR	·	2.1 km	MPC · JPL
302504	2002 GQ_{150}	—	April 14, 2002	Socorro	LINEAR	V	730 m	MPC · JPL
302505	2002 GO_{163}	—	April 14, 2002	Kitt Peak	Spacewatch	·	1.5 km	MPC · JPL
302506	2002 GZ_{164}	—	April 14, 2002	Palomar	NEAT	NYS	1.6 km	MPC · JPL
302507	2002 GS_{169}	—	April 9, 2002	Socorro	LINEAR	·	1.8 km	MPC · JPL
302508	2002 GU_{176}	—	April 8, 2002	Palomar	NEAT	T_{j} (2.99)	4.0 km	MPC · JPL
302509	2002 GK_{184}	—	April 3, 2002	Palomar	NEAT	HYG	3.3 km	MPC · JPL
302510	2002 GP_{189}	—	April 2, 2002	Palomar	NEAT	·	4.2 km	MPC · JPL
302511	2002 GJ_{190}	—	September 21, 2003	Kitt Peak	Spacewatch	·	2.0 km	MPC · JPL
302512	2002 HJ_{2}	—	April 16, 2002	Socorro	LINEAR	·	1.8 km	MPC · JPL
302513	2002 HY_{5}	—	April 18, 2002	Kitt Peak	Spacewatch	MAS	1.1 km	MPC · JPL
302514	2002 JP_{38}	—	May 9, 2002	Palomar	NEAT	·	1.7 km	MPC · JPL
302515	2002 JK_{66}	—	May 10, 2002	Socorro	LINEAR	·	1.9 km	MPC · JPL
302516	2002 JV_{69}	—	May 7, 2002	Socorro	LINEAR	·	2.1 km	MPC · JPL
302517	2002 JJ_{71}	—	May 8, 2002	Socorro	LINEAR	H	640 m	MPC · JPL
302518	2002 JE_{78}	—	May 11, 2002	Socorro	LINEAR	NYS	1.8 km	MPC · JPL
302519	2002 JL_{79}	—	May 11, 2002	Socorro	LINEAR	·	1.8 km	MPC · JPL
302520	2002 JA_{130}	—	May 8, 2002	Socorro	LINEAR	PHO	2.4 km	MPC · JPL
302521	2002 JT_{134}	—	May 9, 2002	Palomar	NEAT	·	1.6 km	MPC · JPL
302522	2002 JC_{147}	—	May 13, 2002	Palomar	NEAT	EUN	1.6 km	MPC · JPL
302523	2002 KH_{3}	—	May 17, 2002	Socorro	LINEAR	AMO +1km	1.1 km	MPC · JPL
302524	2002 KA_{10}	—	May 16, 2002	Socorro	LINEAR	·	2.8 km	MPC · JPL
302525	2002 KR_{16}	—	April 20, 2010	Kitt Peak	Spacewatch	·	3.3 km	MPC · JPL
302526	2002 LQ_{3}	—	June 5, 2002	Socorro	LINEAR	·	1.5 km	MPC · JPL
302527	2002 LR_{22}	—	June 8, 2002	Socorro	LINEAR	·	1.5 km	MPC · JPL
302528	2002 LH_{27}	—	June 8, 2002	Socorro	LINEAR	·	1.7 km	MPC · JPL
302529	2002 LU_{39}	—	June 10, 2002	Socorro	LINEAR	·	1.6 km	MPC · JPL
302530	2002 LC_{58}	—	June 13, 2002	Campo Imperatore	CINEOS	·	4.2 km	MPC · JPL
302531	2002 LL_{58}	—	June 13, 2002	Palomar	NEAT	·	3.1 km	MPC · JPL
302532	2002 LL_{64}	—	November 4, 2007	Kitt Peak	Spacewatch	·	1.3 km	MPC · JPL
302533	2002 LN_{64}	—	October 11, 2007	Kitt Peak	Spacewatch	·	1.6 km	MPC · JPL
302534	2002 LQ_{64}	—	August 11, 1994	La Silla	E. W. Elst	·	1.4 km	MPC · JPL
302535	2002 MM_{5}	—	June 16, 2002	Palomar	NEAT	·	1.5 km	MPC · JPL
302536	2002 NM	—	July 1, 2002	Palomar	NEAT	·	1.8 km	MPC · JPL
302537	2002 NZ	—	July 5, 2002	Kitt Peak	Spacewatch	EUN	1.6 km	MPC · JPL
302538	2002 NE_{8}	—	July 12, 2002	Palomar	NEAT	·	1.9 km	MPC · JPL
302539	2002 NG_{38}	—	July 9, 2002	Socorro	LINEAR	·	2.1 km	MPC · JPL
302540	2002 NA_{40}	—	July 14, 2002	Palomar	NEAT	·	1.4 km	MPC · JPL
302541	2002 NL_{44}	—	July 12, 2002	Palomar	NEAT	·	1.9 km	MPC · JPL
302542 Tilmann	2002 NG_{57}	Tilmann	July 5, 2002	Palomar	M. Meyer	·	2.1 km	MPC · JPL
302543	2002 NW_{63}	—	July 8, 2002	Palomar	NEAT	·	1.3 km	MPC · JPL
302544	2002 NS_{67}	—	July 9, 2002	Palomar	NEAT	·	2.1 km	MPC · JPL
302545	2002 NE_{68}	—	July 12, 2002	Palomar	NEAT	BRG	1.8 km	MPC · JPL
302546	2002 NH_{72}	—	July 15, 2002	Palomar	NEAT	·	1.5 km	MPC · JPL
302547	2002 NX_{74}	—	March 10, 2005	Mount Lemmon	Mount Lemmon Survey	·	1.8 km	MPC · JPL
302548	2002 NA_{77}	—	August 13, 2002	Palomar	NEAT	(5)	1.6 km	MPC · JPL
302549	2002 OO_{8}	—	July 19, 2002	Palomar	NEAT	·	2.0 km	MPC · JPL
302550	2002 OC_{12}	—	July 18, 2002	Socorro	LINEAR	EUN	2.0 km	MPC · JPL
302551	2002 OC_{23}	—	July 20, 2002	Palomar	NEAT	MAR	1.7 km	MPC · JPL
302552	2002 OA_{28}	—	July 19, 2002	Palomar	NEAT	·	1.9 km	MPC · JPL
302553	2002 ON_{28}	—	July 20, 2002	Palomar	NEAT	·	1.6 km	MPC · JPL
302554	2002 OV_{30}	—	July 20, 2002	Palomar	NEAT	·	2.0 km	MPC · JPL
302555	2002 OA_{33}	—	July 29, 2002	Palomar	NEAT	·	1.4 km	MPC · JPL
302556	2002 OW_{33}	—	July 22, 2002	Palomar	NEAT	·	1.8 km	MPC · JPL
302557	2002 OD_{34}	—	July 16, 2002	Palomar	NEAT	·	2.1 km	MPC · JPL
302558	2002 OZ_{34}	—	March 1, 2009	Mount Lemmon	Mount Lemmon Survey	·	2.2 km	MPC · JPL
302559	2002 OQ_{36}	—	January 1, 2009	Kitt Peak	Spacewatch	·	1.8 km	MPC · JPL
302560	2002 PG	—	August 1, 2002	Campo Imperatore	CINEOS	·	1.3 km	MPC · JPL
302561	2002 PB_{3}	—	August 3, 2002	Palomar	NEAT	·	3.1 km	MPC · JPL
302562	2002 PS_{15}	—	August 6, 2002	Palomar	NEAT	·	1.7 km	MPC · JPL
302563	2002 PV_{16}	—	August 6, 2002	Palomar	NEAT	·	1.5 km	MPC · JPL
302564	2002 PH_{27}	—	August 6, 2002	Palomar	NEAT	·	1.8 km	MPC · JPL
302565	2002 PK_{30}	—	August 6, 2002	Palomar	NEAT	·	1.6 km	MPC · JPL
302566	2002 PN_{35}	—	August 6, 2002	Palomar	NEAT	JUN	1.0 km	MPC · JPL
302567	2002 PS_{52}	—	August 8, 2002	Palomar	NEAT	(5)	1.6 km	MPC · JPL
302568	2002 PW_{54}	—	August 9, 2002	Socorro	LINEAR	·	2.5 km	MPC · JPL
302569	2002 PR_{71}	—	August 12, 2002	Socorro	LINEAR	·	3.3 km	MPC · JPL
302570	2002 PD_{73}	—	August 12, 2002	Socorro	LINEAR	·	1.7 km	MPC · JPL
302571	2002 PR_{73}	—	August 12, 2002	Socorro	LINEAR	·	2.1 km	MPC · JPL
302572	2002 PB_{79}	—	August 11, 2002	Palomar	NEAT	·	2.1 km	MPC · JPL
302573	2002 PU_{83}	—	August 10, 2002	Socorro	LINEAR	EUN	1.6 km	MPC · JPL
302574	2002 PV_{90}	—	August 13, 2002	Socorro	LINEAR	MAR	1.8 km	MPC · JPL
302575	2002 PU_{103}	—	August 12, 2002	Socorro	LINEAR	·	1.8 km	MPC · JPL
302576	2002 PE_{106}	—	August 12, 2002	Socorro	LINEAR	ADE	2.7 km	MPC · JPL
302577	2002 PX_{108}	—	August 13, 2002	Socorro	LINEAR	·	1.6 km	MPC · JPL
302578	2002 PC_{110}	—	August 13, 2002	Socorro	LINEAR	·	2.1 km	MPC · JPL
302579	2002 PR_{115}	—	August 13, 2002	Socorro	LINEAR	ADE	3.0 km	MPC · JPL
302580	2002 PW_{132}	—	August 14, 2002	Socorro	LINEAR	·	2.0 km	MPC · JPL
302581	2002 PK_{155}	—	August 8, 2002	Palomar	S. F. Hönig	·	1.5 km	MPC · JPL
302582	2002 PT_{172}	—	August 15, 2002	Palomar	NEAT	·	1.4 km	MPC · JPL
302583	2002 PF_{180}	—	August 8, 2002	Palomar	NEAT	·	1.5 km	MPC · JPL
302584	2002 PS_{180}	—	August 15, 2002	Palomar	NEAT	·	1.6 km	MPC · JPL
302585	2002 PD_{189}	—	August 7, 2002	Palomar	NEAT	EUN	1.1 km	MPC · JPL
302586	2002 PY_{195}	—	January 3, 2009	Mount Lemmon	Mount Lemmon Survey	·	1.5 km	MPC · JPL
302587	2002 PB_{196}	—	October 10, 2002	Kitt Peak	Spacewatch	·	1.5 km	MPC · JPL
302588	2002 PK_{197}	—	December 19, 2007	Kitt Peak	Spacewatch	·	1.4 km	MPC · JPL
302589	2002 PT_{198}	—	November 2, 2007	Kitt Peak	Spacewatch	·	2.9 km	MPC · JPL
302590	2002 QX_{1}	—	August 16, 2002	Palomar	NEAT	·	2.0 km	MPC · JPL
302591	2002 QE_{7}	—	August 18, 2002	Socorro	LINEAR	AMO	410 m	MPC · JPL
302592	2002 QZ_{13}	—	August 26, 2002	Palomar	NEAT	·	1.6 km	MPC · JPL
302593	2002 QF_{14}	—	August 26, 2002	Palomar	NEAT	·	2.0 km	MPC · JPL
302594	2002 QL_{25}	—	August 29, 2002	Kitt Peak	Spacewatch	·	1.6 km	MPC · JPL
302595	2002 QC_{53}	—	August 29, 2002	Palomar	NEAT	·	1.6 km	MPC · JPL
302596	2002 QL_{59}	—	August 28, 2002	Palomar	NEAT	·	1.7 km	MPC · JPL
302597	2002 QP_{60}	—	August 26, 2002	Palomar	NEAT	·	1.5 km	MPC · JPL
302598	2002 QL_{65}	—	August 17, 2002	Palomar	NEAT	·	1.3 km	MPC · JPL
302599	2002 QM_{65}	—	August 27, 2002	Palomar	NEAT	·	1.6 km	MPC · JPL
302600	2002 QH_{73}	—	August 28, 2002	Palomar	NEAT	(5)	1.6 km	MPC · JPL

== 302601–302700 ==
back to top

Designation			Discovery			Properties		Ref
Permanent	Provisional	Named after	Date	Site	Discoverer(s)	Category	Diam.	Ref
302601	2002 QF_{78}	—	August 16, 2002	Palomar	NEAT	ADE	2.2 km	MPC · JPL
302602	2002 QG_{82}	—	August 27, 2002	Palomar	NEAT	ADE	1.9 km	MPC · JPL
302603	2002 QV_{83}	—	August 17, 2002	Palomar	NEAT	·	1.7 km	MPC · JPL
302604	2002 QB_{84}	—	August 16, 2002	Palomar	NEAT	ADE	1.5 km	MPC · JPL
302605	2002 QH_{93}	—	August 19, 2002	Palomar	NEAT	·	1.9 km	MPC · JPL
302606	2002 QU_{95}	—	August 30, 2002	Palomar	NEAT	·	1.5 km	MPC · JPL
302607	2002 QD_{105}	—	August 27, 2002	Palomar	NEAT	(5)	1.5 km	MPC · JPL
302608	2002 QP_{105}	—	August 29, 2002	Palomar	NEAT	·	1.6 km	MPC · JPL
302609	2002 QC_{106}	—	August 19, 2002	Palomar	NEAT	·	2.2 km	MPC · JPL
302610	2002 QX_{106}	—	August 18, 2002	Palomar	NEAT	·	1.4 km	MPC · JPL
302611	2002 QB_{107}	—	August 26, 2002	Palomar	NEAT	·	1.8 km	MPC · JPL
302612	2002 QP_{116}	—	August 18, 2002	Palomar	NEAT	·	1.6 km	MPC · JPL
302613	2002 QG_{122}	—	August 16, 2002	Palomar	NEAT	·	1.8 km	MPC · JPL
302614	2002 QE_{128}	—	August 29, 2002	Palomar	NEAT	·	1.5 km	MPC · JPL
302615	2002 QQ_{129}	—	August 28, 2002	Palomar	NEAT	·	1.2 km	MPC · JPL
302616	2002 QS_{134}	—	August 20, 2002	Palomar	NEAT	·	1.8 km	MPC · JPL
302617	2002 QD_{135}	—	August 30, 2002	Palomar	NEAT	·	1.4 km	MPC · JPL
302618	2002 QT_{135}	—	August 30, 2002	Palomar	NEAT	·	1.7 km	MPC · JPL
302619	2002 QU_{136}	—	April 15, 2001	Kitt Peak	Spacewatch	·	2.4 km	MPC · JPL
302620	2002 QR_{137}	—	August 29, 2002	Palomar	NEAT	·	1.6 km	MPC · JPL
302621	2002 QT_{137}	—	August 17, 2002	Palomar	NEAT	·	1.3 km	MPC · JPL
302622	2002 QF_{138}	—	August 17, 2002	Palomar	NEAT	·	1.5 km	MPC · JPL
302623	2002 QE_{140}	—	August 17, 2002	Palomar	NEAT	·	1.4 km	MPC · JPL
302624	2002 QN_{143}	—	August 9, 1994	La Silla	Hansen, A. T.	·	1.5 km	MPC · JPL
302625	2002 RD_{1}	—	September 4, 2002	Emerald Lane	L. Ball	·	1.7 km	MPC · JPL
302626	2002 RU_{4}	—	September 3, 2002	Palomar	NEAT	·	2.2 km	MPC · JPL
302627	2002 RT_{26}	—	September 4, 2002	Palomar	NEAT	·	2.0 km	MPC · JPL
302628	2002 RB_{31}	—	September 4, 2002	Anderson Mesa	LONEOS	·	2.5 km	MPC · JPL
302629	2002 RL_{36}	—	September 5, 2002	Anderson Mesa	LONEOS	·	2.0 km	MPC · JPL
302630	2002 RB_{42}	—	September 5, 2002	Socorro	LINEAR	·	2.1 km	MPC · JPL
302631	2002 RZ_{80}	—	September 5, 2002	Socorro	LINEAR	·	2.3 km	MPC · JPL
302632	2002 RX_{92}	—	September 5, 2002	Socorro	LINEAR	·	1.9 km	MPC · JPL
302633	2002 RQ_{93}	—	September 5, 2002	Anderson Mesa	LONEOS	ADE	2.3 km	MPC · JPL
302634	2002 RN_{127}	—	September 10, 2002	Palomar	NEAT	ADE	3.2 km	MPC · JPL
302635	2002 RW_{127}	—	September 10, 2002	Palomar	NEAT	·	3.3 km	MPC · JPL
302636	2002 RD_{134}	—	September 10, 2002	Palomar	NEAT	·	2.2 km	MPC · JPL
302637	2002 RS_{134}	—	September 10, 2002	Palomar	NEAT	·	2.5 km	MPC · JPL
302638	2002 RA_{142}	—	September 11, 2002	Palomar	NEAT	·	2.0 km	MPC · JPL
302639	2002 RD_{142}	—	September 11, 2002	Palomar	NEAT	·	1.9 km	MPC · JPL
302640	2002 RX_{157}	—	September 11, 2002	Palomar	NEAT	·	2.0 km	MPC · JPL
302641	2002 RU_{158}	—	September 11, 2002	Palomar	NEAT	·	1.3 km	MPC · JPL
302642	2002 RS_{183}	—	September 11, 2002	Palomar	NEAT	EUN	2.0 km	MPC · JPL
302643	2002 RL_{191}	—	September 11, 2002	Palomar	NEAT	·	2.2 km	MPC · JPL
302644	2002 RJ_{192}	—	September 12, 2002	Palomar	NEAT	·	1.2 km	MPC · JPL
302645	2002 RK_{211}	—	September 15, 2002	Haleakala	NEAT	·	4.1 km	MPC · JPL
302646	2002 RY_{216}	—	September 14, 2002	Palomar	NEAT	HNS	1.9 km	MPC · JPL
302647	2002 RY_{227}	—	September 14, 2002	Haleakala	NEAT	HNS	1.8 km	MPC · JPL
302648	2002 RG_{236}	—	September 12, 2002	Palomar	R. Matson	·	1.6 km	MPC · JPL
302649	2002 RX_{237}	—	September 15, 2002	Palomar	R. Matson	·	1.6 km	MPC · JPL
302650	2002 RX_{239}	—	September 4, 2002	Palomar	S. F. Hönig	·	1.4 km	MPC · JPL
302651	2002 RP_{240}	—	September 14, 2002	Palomar	R. Matson	·	1.4 km	MPC · JPL
302652 Hauke	2002 RW_{241}	Hauke	September 10, 2002	Palomar	M. Meyer	·	2.7 km	MPC · JPL
302653	2002 RE_{244}	—	September 14, 2002	Palomar	NEAT	·	1.7 km	MPC · JPL
302654	2002 RF_{246}	—	September 4, 2002	Palomar	NEAT	(5)	1.7 km	MPC · JPL
302655	2002 RG_{248}	—	September 14, 2002	Palomar	NEAT	·	1.5 km	MPC · JPL
302656	2002 RX_{250}	—	September 8, 2002	Haleakala	NEAT	·	1.6 km	MPC · JPL
302657	2002 RX_{251}	—	September 12, 2002	Palomar	NEAT	·	1.7 km	MPC · JPL
302658	2002 RF_{267}	—	September 14, 2002	Palomar	NEAT	·	1.6 km	MPC · JPL
302659	2002 RJ_{267}	—	September 14, 2002	Palomar	NEAT	·	1.5 km	MPC · JPL
302660	2002 RL_{277}	—	September 13, 2002	Palomar	NEAT	·	2.6 km	MPC · JPL
302661	2002 SH_{3}	—	September 26, 2002	Palomar	NEAT	·	1.8 km	MPC · JPL
302662	2002 SW_{4}	—	September 27, 2002	Palomar	NEAT	·	2.0 km	MPC · JPL
302663	2002 SP_{7}	—	September 27, 2002	Palomar	NEAT	WIT	1.3 km	MPC · JPL
302664	2002 SJ_{12}	—	September 27, 2002	Palomar	NEAT	·	2.4 km	MPC · JPL
302665	2002 SK_{17}	—	September 26, 2002	Palomar	NEAT	EUN	1.5 km	MPC · JPL
302666	2002 SC_{33}	—	September 28, 2002	Haleakala	NEAT	·	2.8 km	MPC · JPL
302667	2002 SW_{38}	—	September 30, 2002	Socorro	LINEAR	·	1.9 km	MPC · JPL
302668	2002 SC_{42}	—	September 28, 2002	Palomar	NEAT	·	2.1 km	MPC · JPL
302669	2002 SC_{48}	—	September 30, 2002	Socorro	LINEAR	HNS	1.7 km	MPC · JPL
302670	2002 SQ_{48}	—	September 30, 2002	Socorro	LINEAR	MAR	1.7 km	MPC · JPL
302671	2002 SJ_{58}	—	September 30, 2002	Haleakala	NEAT	·	3.1 km	MPC · JPL
302672	2002 SZ_{61}	—	September 17, 2002	Palomar	NEAT	·	2.8 km	MPC · JPL
302673	2002 SQ_{67}	—	March 9, 2005	Mount Lemmon	Mount Lemmon Survey	·	2.4 km	MPC · JPL
302674	2002 SR_{68}	—	September 26, 2002	Palomar	NEAT	WIT	950 m	MPC · JPL
302675	2002 SK_{69}	—	September 17, 2002	Palomar	NEAT	·	2.6 km	MPC · JPL
302676	2002 SM_{71}	—	September 26, 2002	Palomar	NEAT	·	2.4 km	MPC · JPL
302677	2002 SH_{74}	—	September 18, 2002	Campo Imperatore	CINEOS	EUN	1.4 km	MPC · JPL
302678	2002 SO_{74}	—	November 7, 2007	Kitt Peak	Spacewatch	·	1.6 km	MPC · JPL
302679	2002 TN_{9}	—	October 1, 2002	Anderson Mesa	LONEOS	·	2.7 km	MPC · JPL
302680	2002 TZ_{13}	—	October 1, 2002	Anderson Mesa	LONEOS	·	3.0 km	MPC · JPL
302681	2002 TJ_{32}	—	October 2, 2002	Socorro	LINEAR	·	2.4 km	MPC · JPL
302682	2002 TS_{32}	—	October 2, 2002	Socorro	LINEAR	·	3.8 km	MPC · JPL
302683	2002 TC_{44}	—	October 2, 2002	Socorro	LINEAR	·	2.3 km	MPC · JPL
302684	2002 TK_{54}	—	October 2, 2002	Socorro	LINEAR	·	1.9 km	MPC · JPL
302685	2002 TA_{57}	—	October 2, 2002	Haleakala	NEAT	·	2.2 km	MPC · JPL
302686	2002 TJ_{61}	—	October 3, 2002	Campo Imperatore	CINEOS	EUN	1.7 km	MPC · JPL
302687	2002 TZ_{61}	—	October 3, 2002	Campo Imperatore	CINEOS	·	3.6 km	MPC · JPL
302688	2002 TB_{67}	—	October 7, 2002	Socorro	LINEAR	·	3.8 km	MPC · JPL
302689	2002 TE_{70}	—	October 2, 2002	Campo Imperatore	CINEOS	·	2.4 km	MPC · JPL
302690	2002 TE_{75}	—	October 1, 2002	Anderson Mesa	LONEOS	·	2.1 km	MPC · JPL
302691	2002 TN_{76}	—	October 1, 2002	Anderson Mesa	LONEOS	·	2.6 km	MPC · JPL
302692	2002 TS_{81}	—	October 1, 2002	Haleakala	NEAT	·	2.4 km	MPC · JPL
302693	2002 TH_{105}	—	October 4, 2002	Anderson Mesa	LONEOS	·	2.3 km	MPC · JPL
302694	2002 TS_{107}	—	October 4, 2002	Socorro	LINEAR	·	1.9 km	MPC · JPL
302695	2002 TX_{115}	—	October 3, 2002	Palomar	NEAT	·	2.6 km	MPC · JPL
302696	2002 TJ_{116}	—	October 3, 2002	Palomar	NEAT	·	2.6 km	MPC · JPL
302697	2002 TT_{118}	—	October 3, 2002	Palomar	NEAT	·	3.9 km	MPC · JPL
302698	2002 TZ_{121}	—	October 3, 2002	Palomar	NEAT	·	2.2 km	MPC · JPL
302699	2002 TY_{146}	—	October 4, 2002	Socorro	LINEAR	·	2.2 km	MPC · JPL
302700	2002 TU_{150}	—	October 5, 2002	Palomar	NEAT	·	1.2 km	MPC · JPL

== 302701–302800 ==
back to top

Designation			Discovery			Properties		Ref
Permanent	Provisional	Named after	Date	Site	Discoverer(s)	Category	Diam.	Ref
302701	2002 TW_{159}	—	October 5, 2002	Palomar	NEAT	·	2.7 km	MPC · JPL
302702	2002 TO_{166}	—	October 3, 2002	Socorro	LINEAR	·	2.1 km	MPC · JPL
302703	2002 TH_{167}	—	October 3, 2002	Palomar	NEAT	EUN	1.7 km	MPC · JPL
302704	2002 TX_{171}	—	October 4, 2002	Palomar	NEAT	·	2.2 km	MPC · JPL
302705	2002 TN_{175}	—	October 4, 2002	Anderson Mesa	LONEOS	EUN	2.0 km	MPC · JPL
302706	2002 TA_{177}	—	October 5, 2002	Palomar	NEAT	·	3.6 km	MPC · JPL
302707	2002 TP_{181}	—	October 3, 2002	Palomar	NEAT	·	2.7 km	MPC · JPL
302708	2002 TM_{192}	—	October 5, 2002	Anderson Mesa	LONEOS	JUN	1.4 km	MPC · JPL
302709	2002 TR_{208}	—	October 5, 2002	Socorro	LINEAR	·	3.3 km	MPC · JPL
302710	2002 TO_{209}	—	October 6, 2002	Haleakala	NEAT	GEF	1.5 km	MPC · JPL
302711	2002 TP_{221}	—	October 6, 2002	Socorro	LINEAR	·	2.5 km	MPC · JPL
302712	2002 TT_{230}	—	October 7, 2002	Palomar	NEAT	·	2.6 km	MPC · JPL
302713	2002 TQ_{233}	—	October 6, 2002	Socorro	LINEAR	EUN	1.9 km	MPC · JPL
302714	2002 TS_{235}	—	October 6, 2002	Socorro	LINEAR	·	2.6 km	MPC · JPL
302715	2002 TA_{249}	—	October 7, 2002	Socorro	LINEAR	MRX	1.4 km	MPC · JPL
302716	2002 TH_{257}	—	October 9, 2002	Socorro	LINEAR	·	2.5 km	MPC · JPL
302717	2002 TE_{276}	—	October 9, 2002	Socorro	LINEAR	·	2.7 km	MPC · JPL
302718	2002 TS_{277}	—	October 10, 2002	Socorro	LINEAR	·	2.7 km	MPC · JPL
302719	2002 TL_{284}	—	October 10, 2002	Socorro	LINEAR	·	3.4 km	MPC · JPL
302720	2002 TC_{294}	—	October 11, 2002	Socorro	LINEAR	·	2.0 km	MPC · JPL
302721	2002 TV_{294}	—	October 12, 2002	Socorro	LINEAR	·	2.2 km	MPC · JPL
302722	2002 TB_{298}	—	October 12, 2002	Socorro	LINEAR	·	2.0 km	MPC · JPL
302723	2002 TH_{300}	—	October 15, 2002	Palomar	NEAT	·	2.1 km	MPC · JPL
302724	2002 TJ_{311}	—	October 4, 2002	Apache Point	SDSS	GEF	1.3 km	MPC · JPL
302725	2002 TN_{311}	—	October 4, 2002	Apache Point	SDSS	·	2.4 km	MPC · JPL
302726	2002 TT_{314}	—	October 4, 2002	Apache Point	SDSS	·	2.8 km	MPC · JPL
302727	2002 TG_{317}	—	October 5, 2002	Apache Point	SDSS	·	1.9 km	MPC · JPL
302728	2002 TP_{323}	—	October 5, 2002	Apache Point	SDSS	·	1.9 km	MPC · JPL
302729	2002 TT_{328}	—	October 5, 2002	Apache Point	SDSS	·	2.4 km	MPC · JPL
302730	2002 TY_{345}	—	October 5, 2002	Apache Point	SDSS	·	2.4 km	MPC · JPL
302731	2002 TC_{370}	—	October 10, 2002	Apache Point	SDSS	·	2.2 km	MPC · JPL
302732	2002 TN_{375}	—	October 1, 2002	Haleakala	NEAT	·	2.4 km	MPC · JPL
302733	2002 TO_{378}	—	October 15, 2002	Palomar	NEAT	·	2.0 km	MPC · JPL
302734	2002 TP_{379}	—	October 6, 2002	Palomar	NEAT	·	1.7 km	MPC · JPL
302735	2002 TC_{382}	—	October 11, 2002	Palomar	NEAT	MRX	1.3 km	MPC · JPL
302736	2002 TY_{382}	—	October 15, 2002	Palomar	NEAT	·	1.8 km	MPC · JPL
302737	2002 TC_{387}	—	June 6, 2010	Kitt Peak	Spacewatch	526	2.4 km	MPC · JPL
302738	2002 UV_{3}	—	October 29, 2002	Palomar	NEAT	·	1.8 km	MPC · JPL
302739	2002 UC_{9}	—	October 28, 2002	Palomar	NEAT	·	1.8 km	MPC · JPL
302740	2002 UB_{16}	—	October 30, 2002	Palomar	NEAT	·	2.2 km	MPC · JPL
302741	2002 UP_{18}	—	October 30, 2002	Palomar	NEAT	·	2.8 km	MPC · JPL
302742	2002 UH_{27}	—	October 31, 2002	Palomar	NEAT	·	2.5 km	MPC · JPL
302743	2002 UE_{28}	—	October 30, 2002	Palomar	NEAT	·	2.5 km	MPC · JPL
302744	2002 UK_{34}	—	October 30, 2002	Palomar	NEAT	·	2.0 km	MPC · JPL
302745	2002 UM_{37}	—	October 31, 2002	Kitt Peak	Spacewatch	·	2.1 km	MPC · JPL
302746	2002 UW_{41}	—	October 30, 2002	Palomar	S. F. Hönig	DOR	2.4 km	MPC · JPL
302747	2002 UW_{55}	—	October 29, 2002	Apache Point	SDSS	·	1.9 km	MPC · JPL
302748	2002 UG_{64}	—	October 30, 2002	Apache Point	SDSS	NEM	1.9 km	MPC · JPL
302749	2002 UJ_{67}	—	October 30, 2002	Apache Point	SDSS	(7744)	1.9 km	MPC · JPL
302750	2002 UY_{75}	—	October 31, 2002	Palomar	NEAT	AEO	1.3 km	MPC · JPL
302751	2002 VJ_{8}	—	November 1, 2002	Palomar	NEAT	·	2.3 km	MPC · JPL
302752	2002 VW_{14}	—	November 6, 2002	Needville	Needville	·	2.3 km	MPC · JPL
302753	2002 VQ_{19}	—	November 4, 2002	Kitt Peak	Spacewatch	·	2.2 km	MPC · JPL
302754	2002 VN_{22}	—	November 5, 2002	Socorro	LINEAR	·	2.7 km	MPC · JPL
302755	2002 VM_{25}	—	November 5, 2002	Socorro	LINEAR	·	3.0 km	MPC · JPL
302756	2002 VX_{28}	—	November 5, 2002	Anderson Mesa	LONEOS	·	2.9 km	MPC · JPL
302757	2002 VN_{39}	—	November 5, 2002	Socorro	LINEAR	·	2.4 km	MPC · JPL
302758	2002 VB_{43}	—	November 4, 2002	Palomar	NEAT	·	2.5 km	MPC · JPL
302759	2002 VH_{53}	—	November 6, 2002	Socorro	LINEAR	·	3.1 km	MPC · JPL
302760	2002 VO_{63}	—	November 6, 2002	Anderson Mesa	LONEOS	·	4.4 km	MPC · JPL
302761	2002 VT_{79}	—	November 7, 2002	Socorro	LINEAR	·	2.3 km	MPC · JPL
302762	2002 VO_{96}	—	November 11, 2002	Anderson Mesa	LONEOS	·	3.0 km	MPC · JPL
302763	2002 VT_{97}	—	November 12, 2002	Socorro	LINEAR	·	2.3 km	MPC · JPL
302764	2002 VS_{99}	—	November 13, 2002	Socorro	LINEAR	·	3.6 km	MPC · JPL
302765	2002 VA_{103}	—	November 12, 2002	Socorro	LINEAR	·	2.5 km	MPC · JPL
302766	2002 VX_{104}	—	November 12, 2002	Socorro	LINEAR	526	3.8 km	MPC · JPL
302767	2002 VV_{107}	—	November 12, 2002	Socorro	LINEAR	·	2.6 km	MPC · JPL
302768	2002 VO_{113}	—	November 13, 2002	Palomar	NEAT	·	2.3 km	MPC · JPL
302769	2002 VR_{122}	—	November 13, 2002	Palomar	NEAT	EUN	1.7 km	MPC · JPL
302770	2002 VR_{123}	—	November 14, 2002	Palomar	NEAT	·	3.1 km	MPC · JPL
302771	2002 VT_{132}	—	November 5, 2002	Socorro	LINEAR	·	2.4 km	MPC · JPL
302772	2002 VD_{135}	—	November 7, 2002	Socorro	LINEAR	·	2.2 km	MPC · JPL
302773	2002 VZ_{135}	—	November 7, 2002	Kitt Peak	Spacewatch	·	2.4 km	MPC · JPL
302774	2002 VS_{144}	—	November 4, 2002	Palomar	NEAT	fast	2.2 km	MPC · JPL
302775	2002 VC_{146}	—	November 14, 2002	Palomar	NEAT	·	2.0 km	MPC · JPL
302776	2002 WD_{5}	—	November 24, 2002	Palomar	NEAT	·	2.6 km	MPC · JPL
302777	2002 WX_{6}	—	November 24, 2002	Palomar	NEAT	·	2.8 km	MPC · JPL
302778	2002 WD_{10}	—	November 24, 2002	Palomar	NEAT	·	2.8 km	MPC · JPL
302779	2002 WP_{22}	—	November 16, 2002	Palomar	NEAT	KOR	1.5 km	MPC · JPL
302780	2002 WW_{28}	—	November 22, 2002	Palomar	NEAT	·	2.8 km	MPC · JPL
302781	2002 XF_{13}	—	December 3, 2002	Haleakala	NEAT	·	2.1 km	MPC · JPL
302782	2002 XB_{19}	—	December 2, 2002	Socorro	LINEAR	·	3.2 km	MPC · JPL
302783	2002 XN_{19}	—	December 2, 2002	Socorro	LINEAR	·	3.5 km	MPC · JPL
302784	2002 XV_{36}	—	December 6, 2002	Socorro	LINEAR	·	3.6 km	MPC · JPL
302785	2002 XR_{40}	—	December 11, 2002	Socorro	LINEAR	·	2.6 km	MPC · JPL
302786	2002 XY_{45}	—	December 10, 2002	Socorro	LINEAR	·	2.5 km	MPC · JPL
302787	2002 XJ_{46}	—	December 7, 2002	Socorro	LINEAR	·	2.2 km	MPC · JPL
302788	2002 XA_{61}	—	December 10, 2002	Socorro	LINEAR	·	2.4 km	MPC · JPL
302789	2002 XK_{61}	—	December 10, 2002	Palomar	NEAT	·	2.3 km	MPC · JPL
302790	2002 XP_{81}	—	December 11, 2002	Socorro	LINEAR	·	3.0 km	MPC · JPL
302791	2002 XX_{81}	—	December 11, 2002	Socorro	LINEAR	·	1.9 km	MPC · JPL
302792	2002 XX_{87}	—	December 12, 2002	Socorro	LINEAR	·	3.1 km	MPC · JPL
302793	2002 XM_{98}	—	December 5, 2002	Socorro	LINEAR	·	3.6 km	MPC · JPL
302794	2002 XR_{102}	—	December 5, 2002	Socorro	LINEAR	BRA	2.4 km	MPC · JPL
302795	2002 XT_{107}	—	December 5, 2002	Socorro	LINEAR	·	4.1 km	MPC · JPL
302796	2002 XK_{115}	—	December 1, 2002	Socorro	LINEAR	DOR	3.0 km	MPC · JPL
302797	2002 XR_{118}	—	December 3, 2002	Palomar	NEAT	·	2.0 km	MPC · JPL
302798	2002 YU_{18}	—	December 31, 2002	Socorro	LINEAR	·	2.4 km	MPC · JPL
302799	2002 YM_{32}	—	December 27, 2002	Palomar	NEAT	·	2.8 km	MPC · JPL
302800	2003 AA	—	January 1, 2003	Socorro	LINEAR	AMO	410 m	MPC · JPL

== 302801–302900 ==
back to top

Designation			Discovery			Properties		Ref
Permanent	Provisional	Named after	Date	Site	Discoverer(s)	Category	Diam.	Ref
302801	2003 AK_{1}	—	January 1, 2003	Socorro	LINEAR	JUN	1.7 km	MPC · JPL
302802	2003 AG_{18}	—	January 5, 2003	Anderson Mesa	LONEOS	·	3.0 km	MPC · JPL
302803	2003 AY_{18}	—	January 4, 2003	Socorro	LINEAR	·	2.6 km	MPC · JPL
302804	2003 AL_{64}	—	January 7, 2003	Socorro	LINEAR	·	3.1 km	MPC · JPL
302805	2003 AF_{73}	—	January 11, 2003	Socorro	LINEAR	·	2.7 km	MPC · JPL
302806	2003 AH_{83}	—	January 4, 2003	Kitt Peak	Deep Lens Survey	EOS	1.8 km	MPC · JPL
302807	2003 BE_{6}	—	January 23, 2003	Kvistaberg	Uppsala-DLR Asteroid Survey	·	2.6 km	MPC · JPL
302808	2003 BB_{16}	—	January 26, 2003	Haleakala	NEAT	·	2.8 km	MPC · JPL
302809	2003 BE_{24}	—	January 25, 2003	Palomar	NEAT	·	2.6 km	MPC · JPL
302810	2003 BA_{31}	—	January 27, 2003	Socorro	LINEAR	·	3.9 km	MPC · JPL
302811	2003 BB_{37}	—	January 28, 2003	Kitt Peak	Spacewatch	·	820 m	MPC · JPL
302812	2003 BJ_{63}	—	January 28, 2003	Socorro	LINEAR	·	6.6 km	MPC · JPL
302813	2003 BL_{70}	—	January 30, 2003	Kitt Peak	Spacewatch	·	4.0 km	MPC · JPL
302814	2003 BH_{72}	—	January 28, 2003	Socorro	LINEAR	·	4.1 km	MPC · JPL
302815	2003 BY_{73}	—	January 29, 2003	Palomar	NEAT	EOS	2.6 km	MPC · JPL
302816	2003 BU_{75}	—	January 29, 2003	Palomar	NEAT	EUP	6.8 km	MPC · JPL
302817	2003 BH_{85}	—	January 31, 2003	Socorro	LINEAR	·	3.2 km	MPC · JPL
302818	2003 BV_{91}	—	January 25, 2003	La Silla	La Silla	·	890 m	MPC · JPL
302819	2003 CJ_{1}	—	February 1, 2003	Socorro	LINEAR	·	5.6 km	MPC · JPL
302820	2003 CJ_{5}	—	February 1, 2003	Anderson Mesa	LONEOS	·	3.9 km	MPC · JPL
302821	2003 CC_{9}	—	February 2, 2003	Palomar	NEAT	·	830 m	MPC · JPL
302822	2003 CG_{20}	—	February 9, 2003	Palomar	NEAT	·	970 m	MPC · JPL
302823	2003 DQ_{8}	—	February 22, 2003	Palomar	NEAT	·	1.0 km	MPC · JPL
302824	2003 DZ_{8}	—	February 23, 2003	Kitt Peak	Spacewatch	KOR	1.4 km	MPC · JPL
302825	2003 DX_{16}	—	February 21, 2003	Palomar	NEAT	THM	2.9 km	MPC · JPL
302826	2003 DC_{19}	—	February 21, 2003	Palomar	NEAT	·	3.5 km	MPC · JPL
302827	2003 EM_{48}	—	March 9, 2003	Socorro	LINEAR	TIR	3.7 km	MPC · JPL
302828	2003 ED_{52}	—	March 11, 2003	Palomar	NEAT	·	790 m	MPC · JPL
302829	2003 EB_{63}	—	March 12, 2003	Kitt Peak	Spacewatch	·	2.8 km	MPC · JPL
302830	2003 FB	—	March 22, 2003	Socorro	LINEAR	APO	610 m	MPC · JPL
302831	2003 FH	—	March 23, 2003	Palomar	NEAT	APO · PHA	530 m	MPC · JPL
302832	2003 FK_{13}	—	March 23, 2003	Kitt Peak	Spacewatch	URS	3.6 km	MPC · JPL
302833	2003 FP_{18}	—	March 11, 2003	Kitt Peak	Spacewatch	·	800 m	MPC · JPL
302834	2003 FG_{41}	—	March 25, 2003	Palomar	NEAT	·	970 m	MPC · JPL
302835	2003 FY_{44}	—	March 24, 2003	Kitt Peak	Spacewatch	·	4.5 km	MPC · JPL
302836	2003 FF_{54}	—	March 25, 2003	Haleakala	NEAT	·	3.3 km	MPC · JPL
302837	2003 FM_{54}	—	March 25, 2003	Haleakala	NEAT	·	1.3 km	MPC · JPL
302838	2003 FB_{55}	—	March 25, 2003	Haleakala	NEAT	·	4.6 km	MPC · JPL
302839	2003 FQ_{56}	—	March 26, 2003	Palomar	NEAT	·	900 m	MPC · JPL
302840	2003 FP_{58}	—	March 11, 2003	Palomar	NEAT	·	3.3 km	MPC · JPL
302841	2003 FC_{63}	—	March 26, 2003	Kitt Peak	Spacewatch	·	3.2 km	MPC · JPL
302842	2003 FQ_{66}	—	March 26, 2003	Palomar	NEAT	(2076)	1.5 km	MPC · JPL
302843	2003 FW_{85}	—	March 28, 2003	Anderson Mesa	LONEOS	PHO	1.1 km	MPC · JPL
302844	2003 FV_{92}	—	March 29, 2003	Anderson Mesa	LONEOS	·	3.8 km	MPC · JPL
302845	2003 FO_{100}	—	March 31, 2003	Anderson Mesa	LONEOS	·	3.6 km	MPC · JPL
302846	2003 FF_{106}	—	March 26, 2003	Palomar	NEAT	·	1.0 km	MPC · JPL
302847	2003 FV_{113}	—	March 31, 2003	Socorro	LINEAR	·	3.2 km	MPC · JPL
302848	2003 FW_{118}	—	March 26, 2003	Anderson Mesa	LONEOS	·	750 m	MPC · JPL
302849 Richardboyle	2003 FB_{123}	Richardboyle	March 27, 2003	Moletai	K. Černis, Zdanavicius, J.	·	5.8 km	MPC · JPL
302850	2003 FY_{126}	—	March 31, 2003	Kitt Peak	Spacewatch	·	690 m	MPC · JPL
302851	2003 FN_{132}	—	March 26, 2003	Kitt Peak	Spacewatch	·	4.3 km	MPC · JPL
302852	2003 GR_{2}	—	April 1, 2003	Socorro	LINEAR	·	960 m	MPC · JPL
302853	2003 GZ_{10}	—	April 1, 2003	Socorro	LINEAR	·	850 m	MPC · JPL
302854	2003 GZ_{18}	—	April 4, 2003	Kitt Peak	Spacewatch	·	590 m	MPC · JPL
302855	2003 GX_{27}	—	April 7, 2003	Kitt Peak	Spacewatch	·	3.4 km	MPC · JPL
302856	2003 GF_{31}	—	April 8, 2003	Kitt Peak	Spacewatch	·	3.9 km	MPC · JPL
302857	2003 GM_{35}	—	April 7, 2003	Palomar	NEAT	·	2.1 km	MPC · JPL
302858	2003 GN_{36}	—	April 5, 2003	Kitt Peak	Spacewatch	·	2.6 km	MPC · JPL
302859	2003 GY_{37}	—	April 8, 2003	Socorro	LINEAR	·	4.6 km	MPC · JPL
302860	2003 GJ_{38}	—	April 5, 2003	Anderson Mesa	LONEOS	EUP	6.2 km	MPC · JPL
302861	2003 GA_{39}	—	April 9, 2003	Kitt Peak	Spacewatch	·	700 m	MPC · JPL
302862	2003 GY_{44}	—	April 7, 2003	Socorro	LINEAR	(2076)	900 m	MPC · JPL
302863	2003 GN_{46}	—	April 8, 2003	Palomar	NEAT	·	3.8 km	MPC · JPL
302864	2003 GJ_{54}	—	April 1, 2003	Kitt Peak	Deep Lens Survey	EOS	2.8 km	MPC · JPL
302865	2003 GN_{56}	—	April 9, 2003	Palomar	NEAT	·	900 m	MPC · JPL
302866	2003 GU_{56}	—	April 1, 2003	Apache Point	SDSS	EOS	2.1 km	MPC · JPL
302867	2003 HJ_{4}	—	April 24, 2003	Anderson Mesa	LONEOS	NYS	1.1 km	MPC · JPL
302868	2003 HW_{7}	—	April 24, 2003	Anderson Mesa	LONEOS	·	2.2 km	MPC · JPL
302869	2003 HT_{11}	—	April 25, 2003	Anderson Mesa	LONEOS	·	4.7 km	MPC · JPL
302870	2003 HF_{16}	—	April 25, 2003	Campo Imperatore	CINEOS	·	1.0 km	MPC · JPL
302871	2003 HA_{22}	—	April 27, 2003	Anderson Mesa	LONEOS	AMO	460 m	MPC · JPL
302872	2003 HY_{24}	—	April 25, 2003	Kitt Peak	Spacewatch	·	2.7 km	MPC · JPL
302873	2003 HH_{35}	—	April 26, 2003	Kitt Peak	Spacewatch	·	740 m	MPC · JPL
302874	2003 HM_{37}	—	April 26, 2003	Haleakala	NEAT	·	1.7 km	MPC · JPL
302875	2003 HP_{47}	—	April 29, 2003	Anderson Mesa	LONEOS	·	880 m	MPC · JPL
302876	2003 HP_{49}	—	April 28, 2003	Kitt Peak	Spacewatch	V	720 m	MPC · JPL
302877	2003 HG_{51}	—	April 29, 2003	Kitt Peak	Spacewatch	·	4.9 km	MPC · JPL
302878	2003 HU_{58}	—	April 25, 2003	Kitt Peak	Spacewatch	·	4.4 km	MPC · JPL
302879	2003 JN_{6}	—	May 1, 2003	Socorro	LINEAR	·	1.2 km	MPC · JPL
302880	2003 JY_{16}	—	May 9, 2003	Socorro	LINEAR	·	1.2 km	MPC · JPL
302881	2003 JH_{17}	—	May 8, 2003	Socorro	LINEAR	(2076)	1.2 km	MPC · JPL
302882	2003 LZ	—	June 2, 2003	Kitt Peak	Spacewatch	·	1.2 km	MPC · JPL
302883	2003 LL_{1}	—	June 2, 2003	Kitt Peak	Spacewatch	·	3.6 km	MPC · JPL
302884	2003 MH	—	June 19, 2003	Reedy Creek	J. Broughton	NYS	1.3 km	MPC · JPL
302885	2003 NC_{2}	—	July 1, 2003	Socorro	LINEAR	·	1.5 km	MPC · JPL
302886	2003 NS_{3}	—	July 3, 2003	Kitt Peak	Spacewatch	·	2.0 km	MPC · JPL
302887	2003 NN_{4}	—	July 3, 2003	Kitt Peak	Spacewatch	·	1.7 km	MPC · JPL
302888	2003 NY_{12}	—	July 6, 2003	Kitt Peak	Spacewatch	·	1.6 km	MPC · JPL
302889	2003 NE_{13}	—	July 5, 2003	Kitt Peak	Spacewatch	·	1.1 km	MPC · JPL
302890	2003 OE_{6}	—	July 23, 2003	Palomar	NEAT	·	1.7 km	MPC · JPL
302891	2003 OA_{11}	—	July 27, 2003	Palomar	NEAT	·	1.8 km	MPC · JPL
302892	2003 OF_{27}	—	July 24, 2003	Palomar	NEAT	·	1.2 km	MPC · JPL
302893	2003 PK	—	August 1, 2003	Črni Vrh	Skvarč, J.	H	780 m	MPC · JPL
302894	2003 QM	—	August 18, 2003	Campo Imperatore	CINEOS	·	1.6 km	MPC · JPL
302895	2003 QD_{5}	—	August 20, 2003	Campo Imperatore	CINEOS	·	1.3 km	MPC · JPL
302896	2003 QA_{7}	—	August 20, 2003	Campo Imperatore	CINEOS	MAS	790 m	MPC · JPL
302897	2003 QW_{7}	—	August 21, 2003	Palomar	NEAT	·	1.4 km	MPC · JPL
302898	2003 QU_{10}	—	August 22, 2003	Palomar	NEAT	·	560 m	MPC · JPL
302899	2003 QV_{18}	—	August 22, 2003	Socorro	LINEAR	·	990 m	MPC · JPL
302900	2003 QD_{37}	—	August 22, 2003	Palomar	NEAT	·	1.4 km	MPC · JPL

== 302901–303000 ==
back to top

Designation			Discovery			Properties		Ref
Permanent	Provisional	Named after	Date	Site	Discoverer(s)	Category	Diam.	Ref
302901	2003 QG_{50}	—	August 22, 2003	Palomar	NEAT	·	1.6 km	MPC · JPL
302902	2003 QF_{105}	—	August 31, 2003	Haleakala	NEAT	·	1.9 km	MPC · JPL
302903	2003 QY_{112}	—	August 30, 2003	Haleakala	NEAT	·	2.8 km	MPC · JPL
302904	2003 RE	—	September 1, 2003	Socorro	LINEAR	PHO	1.4 km	MPC · JPL
302905	2003 SQ_{29}	—	September 18, 2003	Palomar	NEAT	·	1.6 km	MPC · JPL
302906	2003 ST_{29}	—	September 18, 2003	Desert Eagle	W. K. Y. Yeung	·	2.4 km	MPC · JPL
302907	2003 SR_{34}	—	September 18, 2003	Palomar	NEAT	·	1.4 km	MPC · JPL
302908	2003 SZ_{39}	—	September 16, 2003	Palomar	NEAT	·	1.6 km	MPC · JPL
302909	2003 SW_{42}	—	September 16, 2003	Anderson Mesa	LONEOS	V	850 m	MPC · JPL
302910	2003 SC_{48}	—	September 18, 2003	Palomar	NEAT	T_{j} (2.98) · 3:2	7.2 km	MPC · JPL
302911	2003 SS_{51}	—	September 18, 2003	Palomar	NEAT	·	1.6 km	MPC · JPL
302912	2003 ST_{51}	—	September 18, 2003	Palomar	NEAT	·	1.7 km	MPC · JPL
302913	2003 SE_{57}	—	September 16, 2003	Kitt Peak	Spacewatch	NYS	1.3 km	MPC · JPL
302914	2003 SS_{61}	—	September 17, 2003	Socorro	LINEAR	NYS	1.5 km	MPC · JPL
302915	2003 SZ_{77}	—	September 19, 2003	Kitt Peak	Spacewatch	HIL · 3:2	6.3 km	MPC · JPL
302916	2003 SX_{94}	—	September 19, 2003	Kitt Peak	Spacewatch	·	1.7 km	MPC · JPL
302917	2003 SC_{102}	—	September 20, 2003	Socorro	LINEAR	H	540 m	MPC · JPL
302918	2003 SM_{122}	—	September 18, 2003	Anderson Mesa	LONEOS	·	2.1 km	MPC · JPL
302919	2003 SA_{130}	—	September 21, 2003	Socorro	LINEAR	H	650 m	MPC · JPL
302920	2003 SX_{157}	—	September 20, 2003	Socorro	LINEAR	·	1.6 km	MPC · JPL
302921	2003 SK_{168}	—	September 23, 2003	Haleakala	NEAT	·	3.1 km	MPC · JPL
302922	2003 SN_{178}	—	September 19, 2003	Palomar	NEAT	3:2 · SHU	5.1 km	MPC · JPL
302923	2003 SG_{195}	—	September 20, 2003	Palomar	NEAT	·	1.2 km	MPC · JPL
302924	2003 SA_{211}	—	September 23, 2003	Palomar	NEAT	·	1.9 km	MPC · JPL
302925	2003 SW_{216}	—	September 27, 2003	Socorro	LINEAR	·	3.4 km	MPC · JPL
302926	2003 SF_{222}	—	September 27, 2003	Desert Eagle	W. K. Y. Yeung	·	1.5 km	MPC · JPL
302927	2003 SJ_{228}	—	September 28, 2003	Kitt Peak	Spacewatch	(5)	1.3 km	MPC · JPL
302928	2003 SE_{245}	—	September 26, 2003	Socorro	LINEAR	NYS	1.4 km	MPC · JPL
302929	2003 SY_{256}	—	September 28, 2003	Kitt Peak	Spacewatch	3:2 · SHU	5.9 km	MPC · JPL
302930	2003 SB_{267}	—	September 29, 2003	Socorro	LINEAR	(5)	940 m	MPC · JPL
302931	2003 SP_{284}	—	September 20, 2003	Socorro	LINEAR	·	1.5 km	MPC · JPL
302932 Francoballoni	2003 SB_{314}	Francoballoni	September 29, 2003	Andrushivka	Andrushivka	·	1.6 km	MPC · JPL
302933	2003 SY_{322}	—	September 16, 2003	Palomar	NEAT	·	1.5 km	MPC · JPL
302934	2003 SL_{332}	—	September 28, 2003	Socorro	LINEAR	·	1.4 km	MPC · JPL
302935	2003 SC_{334}	—	September 22, 2003	Kitt Peak	Spacewatch	·	1.4 km	MPC · JPL
302936	2003 SB_{335}	—	September 26, 2003	Apache Point	SDSS	·	1.6 km	MPC · JPL
302937	2003 SA_{382}	—	September 26, 2003	Apache Point	SDSS	·	1.3 km	MPC · JPL
302938	2003 SX_{391}	—	September 26, 2003	Apache Point	SDSS	·	1.5 km	MPC · JPL
302939	2003 SW_{396}	—	September 26, 2003	Apache Point	SDSS	·	1.4 km	MPC · JPL
302940	2003 SR_{407}	—	September 27, 2003	Apache Point	SDSS	·	1.5 km	MPC · JPL
302941	2003 SD_{416}	—	September 28, 2003	Apache Point	SDSS	·	1.8 km	MPC · JPL
302942	2003 SE_{423}	—	September 19, 2003	Kitt Peak	Spacewatch	·	890 m	MPC · JPL
302943	2003 SQ_{429}	—	September 28, 2003	Anderson Mesa	LONEOS	H	530 m	MPC · JPL
302944	2003 TU_{3}	—	October 2, 2003	Kitt Peak	Spacewatch	H	540 m	MPC · JPL
302945	2003 TP_{6}	—	October 1, 2003	Anderson Mesa	LONEOS	·	1.8 km	MPC · JPL
302946	2003 TS_{20}	—	October 15, 2003	Anderson Mesa	LONEOS	NYS	1.5 km	MPC · JPL
302947	2003 TV_{36}	—	October 1, 2003	Kitt Peak	Spacewatch	·	590 m	MPC · JPL
302948	2003 UL_{6}	—	October 18, 2003	Palomar	NEAT	H	940 m	MPC · JPL
302949	2003 UH_{8}	—	October 18, 2003	Palomar	NEAT	H	840 m	MPC · JPL
302950	2003 UJ_{11}	—	October 16, 2003	Anderson Mesa	LONEOS	H	770 m	MPC · JPL
302951	2003 UF_{18}	—	October 19, 2003	Kitt Peak	Spacewatch	(5)	1.3 km	MPC · JPL
302952	2003 UM_{41}	—	October 17, 2003	Kitt Peak	Spacewatch	·	1.3 km	MPC · JPL
302953	2003 UT_{42}	—	October 17, 2003	Kitt Peak	Spacewatch	·	1.6 km	MPC · JPL
302954	2003 UG_{81}	—	October 16, 2003	Anderson Mesa	LONEOS	T_{j} (2.96)	7.4 km	MPC · JPL
302955	2003 UQ_{91}	—	October 20, 2003	Kitt Peak	Spacewatch	·	1.8 km	MPC · JPL
302956	2003 UA_{95}	—	October 18, 2003	Kitt Peak	Spacewatch	·	2.0 km	MPC · JPL
302957	2003 UQ_{109}	—	October 19, 2003	Kitt Peak	Spacewatch	·	1.1 km	MPC · JPL
302958	2003 UZ_{166}	—	October 22, 2003	Socorro	LINEAR	H	590 m	MPC · JPL
302959	2003 UU_{175}	—	October 21, 2003	Anderson Mesa	LONEOS	·	1.1 km	MPC · JPL
302960	2003 US_{179}	—	October 21, 2003	Socorro	LINEAR	·	1.3 km	MPC · JPL
302961	2003 UY_{209}	—	October 23, 2003	Anderson Mesa	LONEOS	(5)	1.9 km	MPC · JPL
302962	2003 UL_{219}	—	October 21, 2003	Kitt Peak	Spacewatch	·	1.1 km	MPC · JPL
302963	2003 UD_{224}	—	October 22, 2003	Socorro	LINEAR	·	1.3 km	MPC · JPL
302964	2003 US_{239}	—	October 24, 2003	Socorro	LINEAR	(5)	800 m	MPC · JPL
302965	2003 UT_{240}	—	October 24, 2003	Kitt Peak	Spacewatch	(5)	1.1 km	MPC · JPL
302966	2003 UF_{241}	—	October 24, 2003	Kitt Peak	Spacewatch	·	1.3 km	MPC · JPL
302967	2003 UU_{248}	—	October 25, 2003	Socorro	LINEAR	(5)	1.0 km	MPC · JPL
302968	2003 UD_{269}	—	October 28, 2003	Haleakala	NEAT	·	1.0 km	MPC · JPL
302969	2003 UT_{283}	—	October 30, 2003	Socorro	LINEAR	·	1.4 km	MPC · JPL
302970	2003 UL_{302}	—	October 17, 2003	Kitt Peak	Spacewatch	·	1.2 km	MPC · JPL
302971	2003 UT_{302}	—	October 17, 2003	Kitt Peak	Spacewatch	·	1.6 km	MPC · JPL
302972	2003 UO_{304}	—	October 18, 2003	Anderson Mesa	LONEOS	·	2.1 km	MPC · JPL
302973	2003 UW_{314}	—	October 21, 2003	Anderson Mesa	LONEOS	·	1.8 km	MPC · JPL
302974	2003 UF_{315}	—	October 29, 2003	Socorro	LINEAR	H	750 m	MPC · JPL
302975	2003 UH_{317}	—	October 19, 2003	Apache Point	SDSS	V	840 m	MPC · JPL
302976	2003 UK_{317}	—	October 19, 2003	Apache Point	SDSS	MAS	810 m	MPC · JPL
302977	2003 UO_{327}	—	October 17, 2003	Apache Point	SDSS	PHO	860 m	MPC · JPL
302978	2003 UO_{336}	—	October 18, 2003	Apache Point	SDSS	·	1.1 km	MPC · JPL
302979	2003 UK_{339}	—	October 1, 2003	Kitt Peak	Spacewatch	PHO	1.6 km	MPC · JPL
302980	2003 UO_{357}	—	June 13, 2002	Palomar	NEAT	·	2.8 km	MPC · JPL
302981	2003 UK_{374}	—	October 22, 2003	Apache Point	SDSS	PHO	1.2 km	MPC · JPL
302982	2003 UA_{376}	—	October 22, 2003	Apache Point	SDSS	·	1.3 km	MPC · JPL
302983	2003 US_{376}	—	October 22, 2003	Apache Point	SDSS	MAS	840 m	MPC · JPL
302984	2003 UB_{382}	—	October 22, 2003	Apache Point	SDSS	·	1.4 km	MPC · JPL
302985	2003 VB_{4}	—	November 14, 2003	Palomar	NEAT	·	1.0 km	MPC · JPL
302986	2003 VL_{12}	—	November 4, 2003	Socorro	LINEAR	·	2.4 km	MPC · JPL
302987	2003 WD_{2}	—	November 16, 2003	Catalina	CSS	·	1.9 km	MPC · JPL
302988	2003 WH_{2}	—	November 16, 2003	Kitt Peak	Spacewatch	·	1.4 km	MPC · JPL
302989	2003 WL_{3}	—	November 16, 2003	Catalina	CSS	·	1.2 km	MPC · JPL
302990	2003 WQ_{22}	—	November 20, 2003	Socorro	LINEAR	·	1.2 km	MPC · JPL
302991	2003 WV_{23}	—	November 18, 2003	Kitt Peak	Spacewatch	·	1.6 km	MPC · JPL
302992	2003 WH_{26}	—	November 21, 2003	Socorro	LINEAR	·	2.2 km	MPC · JPL
302993	2003 WH_{29}	—	November 18, 2003	Kitt Peak	Spacewatch	·	2.3 km	MPC · JPL
302994	2003 WR_{33}	—	November 18, 2003	Palomar	NEAT	·	1.9 km	MPC · JPL
302995	2003 WV_{34}	—	November 19, 2003	Kitt Peak	Spacewatch	·	1.9 km	MPC · JPL
302996	2003 WP_{42}	—	November 21, 2003	Catalina	CSS	·	1.3 km	MPC · JPL
302997	2003 WE_{47}	—	November 18, 2003	Palomar	NEAT	·	1.5 km	MPC · JPL
302998	2003 WE_{52}	—	November 19, 2003	Kitt Peak	Spacewatch	·	2.2 km	MPC · JPL
302999	2003 WN_{59}	—	November 18, 2003	Kitt Peak	Spacewatch	(5)	1.2 km	MPC · JPL
303000	2003 WN_{60}	—	November 18, 2003	Palomar	NEAT	·	2.1 km	MPC · JPL

back to top

== See also ==
- Meanings of minor-planet names: 302001–303000
