= Meanings of minor-planet names: 302001–303000 =

As minor planet discoveries are confirmed, they are given a permanent number by the IAU's Minor Planet Center (MPC), and the discoverers can then submit names for them, following the IAU's naming conventions. The list below concerns those minor planets in the specified number-range that have received names, and explains the meanings of those names.

Official naming citations of newly named small Solar System bodies are approved and published in a bulletin by IAU's Working Group for Small Bodies Nomenclature (WGSBN). Before May 2021, citations were published in MPC's Minor Planet Circulars for many decades. Recent citations can also be found on the JPL Small-Body Database (SBDB). Until his death in 2016, German astronomer Lutz D. Schmadel compiled these citations into the Dictionary of Minor Planet Names (DMP) and regularly updated the collection.

Based on Paul Herget's The Names of the Minor Planets, Schmadel also researched the unclear origin of numerous asteroids, most of which had been named prior to World War II. This article incorporates text from this source, which is in the public domain: SBDB New namings may only be added to this list below after official publication as the preannouncement of names is condemned. The WGSBN publishes a comprehensive guideline for the naming rules of non-cometary small Solar System bodies.

== 302001–302100 ==
Named minor planet	Provisional	This minor planet was named for...	Ref · Catalog
There are no named minor planets in this number range

== 302101–302200 ==
back to top

Named minor planet	Provisional	This minor planet was named for...	Ref · Catalog
There are no named minor planets in this number range

== 302201–302300 ==
back to top

Named minor planet	Provisional	This minor planet was named for...	Ref · Catalog
There are no named minor planets in this number range

== 302301–302400 ==
back to top

Named minor planet	Provisional	This minor planet was named for...	Ref · Catalog
There are no named minor planets in this number range

== 302401–302500 ==
back to top

Named minor planet	Provisional	This minor planet was named for...	Ref · Catalog
There are no named minor planets in this number range

== 302501–302600 ==
back to top

Named minor planet	Provisional	This minor planet was named for...	Ref · Catalog
302542 Tilmann	2002 NG_{57}	Tilmann Arne Meyer (born 2006), son of German discoverer Maik Meyer	JPL · 302542

== 302601–302700 ==
back to top

Named minor planet	Provisional	This minor planet was named for...	Ref · Catalog
302652 Hauke	2002 RW_{241}	Hauke Christoph Meyer (born 2011), son of German discoverer Maik Meyer	JPL · 302652

== 302701–302800 ==
back to top

Named minor planet	Provisional	This minor planet was named for...	Ref · Catalog
There are no named minor planets in this number range

== 302801–302900 ==
back to top

Named minor planet	Provisional	This minor planet was named for...	Ref · Catalog
302849 Richardboyle	2003 FB_{123}	Richard Boyle (born 1943), an astronomer at the Vatican Observatory. He is an expert in high-precision photometry of stars and stellar clusters. His work includes asteroseismology and the discoveries of minor planets using the Vatican Advanced Technology Telescope at Mount Graham, Arizona, United States.	JPL · 302849

== 302901–303000 ==
back to top

Named minor planet	Provisional	This minor planet was named for...	Ref · Catalog
302932 Francoballoni	2003 SB_{314}	Nicola Franco Balloni (born 1950), an Italian diplomat and scholar.	JPL · 302932

back to top

Preceded by 301,001–302,000	Meanings of minor-planet names List of minor planets: 302,001–303,000	Succeeded by 303,001–304,000
