= Yuri Ivashchenko =

Ukrainian astronomer

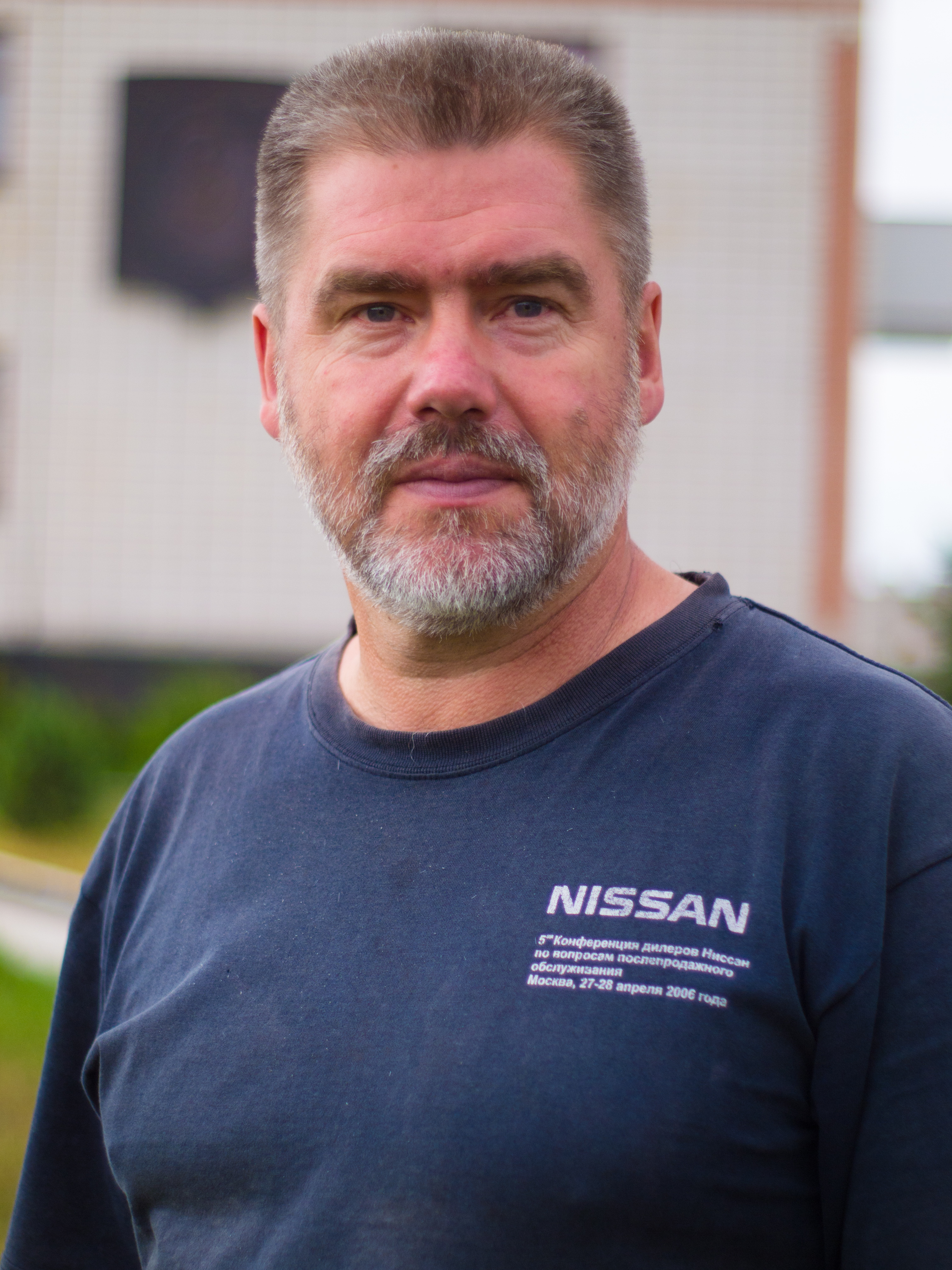
Yuri Ivashchenko

Yuri Ivashchenko (Ukrainian: Іващенко Юрій Миколайович; born April 12, 1961) is a Ukrainian astronomer.

== Biography ==
Yuri Ivashchenko was born in Andrushivka, Zhytomyr Oblast, Ukraine on April 12, 1961, the day Yuri Gagarin became the first human to journey into outer space. Therefore, his parents decided to name him after Yuri Gagarin. His father was a journalist of a regional newspaper, and his mother was a teacher of science and astronomy.

He graduated from a school No. 1 in Andrushivka. He was fond of astronomy since he was a child. In 1983, he graduated from Taras Shevchenko State University of Kyiv, physics faculty, department of astronomy. In 1983–1992, he worked in the Main Astronomical Observatory of the Academy of Sciences of Ukraine, where he received a degree of Candidate of Physico-mathematical Sciences. In 1992, after the dissolution of the Soviet Union, he left his academic position and joined an automobile dealer company in Kyiv.

In 1998, he started to build his private observatory, which was launched on April 12, 2001, as Andrushivka Astronomical Observatory (A50). In 2003, Yuri Ivashchenko and his colleagues discovered their first asteroids in the observatory.

In 2005–2012, Andrushivka Astronomical Observatory was among top-20 observatories of the world by number of minor planet observations. Since 2003, more than 110 asteroids were discovered by its team.

In June 2014, because of the crisis in the automotive industry in Ukraine, he left the dealer center and once again became a research scientist at the Main Observatory of Ukraine's Academy of Sciences. Meanwhile, he continues supervising of the Andrushivka Observatory.
