= List of minor planets: 726001–727000 =

The following is a partial list of minor planets, running from minor-planet number 726001 through 727000, inclusive. The primary data for this and other partial lists is based on JPL's "Small-Body Orbital Elements" and data available from the Minor Planet Center. Critical list information is also provided by the MPC, unless otherwise specified from Lowell Observatory. A detailed description of the table's columns and additional sources are given on the main page including a complete list of every page in this series, and a statistical break-up on the dynamical classification of minor planets.

Also see the summary list of all named bodies in numerical and alphabetical order, and the corresponding naming citations for the number range of this particular list. New namings may only be added to this list after official publication, as the preannouncement of names is condemned by the Working Group for Small Bodies Nomenclature of the International Astronomical Union.

Near-Earth obj.	MBA (inner)	MBA (outer)	Centaur
Mars-crosser	MBA (middle)	Jupiter trojan	Trans-Neptunian obj.
Unclassified

== 726001–726100 ==
Designation			Discovery			Properties		Ref
Permanent	Provisional	Named after	Date	Site	Discoverer(s)	Category	Diam.	Ref
726001	2009 QP_{5}	—	August 16, 2009	Kitt Peak	Spacewatch	NYS	1.1 km	MPC · JPL
726002	2009 QG_{7}	—	July 29, 2005	Palomar	NEAT	·	2.6 km	MPC · JPL
726003	2009 QD_{9}	—	March 12, 2007	Catalina	CSS	LUT	5.3 km	MPC · JPL
726004	2009 QL_{12}	—	August 16, 2009	Kitt Peak	Spacewatch	·	1.1 km	MPC · JPL
726005	2009 QB_{18}	—	August 17, 2009	Kitt Peak	Spacewatch	·	1.5 km	MPC · JPL
726006	2009 QK_{48}	—	November 22, 2005	Sacramento Peak	SDSS Collaboration	·	1.7 km	MPC · JPL
726007	2009 QG_{61}	—	September 5, 2000	Wise	Y. J. Choi, N. Brosch	·	1.5 km	MPC · JPL
726008	2009 QZ_{61}	—	August 27, 2009	Kitt Peak	Spacewatch	·	1.1 km	MPC · JPL
726009	2009 QG_{62}	—	August 28, 2009	Kitt Peak	Spacewatch	·	1.9 km	MPC · JPL
726010	2009 QP_{66}	—	August 18, 2009	Kitt Peak	Spacewatch	·	3.4 km	MPC · JPL
726011	2009 QD_{67}	—	August 14, 2004	Cerro Tololo	Deep Ecliptic Survey	KOR	1.3 km	MPC · JPL
726012	2009 QT_{67}	—	August 16, 2009	Kitt Peak	Spacewatch	·	970 m	MPC · JPL
726013	2009 QC_{68}	—	October 5, 2013	Haleakala	Pan-STARRS 1	·	950 m	MPC · JPL
726014	2009 QH_{68}	—	September 29, 2014	Haleakala	Pan-STARRS 1	PAD	1.2 km	MPC · JPL
726015	2009 QG_{69}	—	June 24, 2009	Mount Lemmon	Mount Lemmon Survey	·	1.5 km	MPC · JPL
726016	2009 QR_{71}	—	August 28, 2009	Kitt Peak	Spacewatch	MAS	560 m	MPC · JPL
726017	2009 QV_{72}	—	August 20, 2009	Kitt Peak	Spacewatch	·	980 m	MPC · JPL
726018	2009 QB_{73}	—	August 17, 2009	Kitt Peak	Spacewatch	NYS	1.1 km	MPC · JPL
726019	2009 QE_{73}	—	August 18, 2009	Kitt Peak	Spacewatch	NYS	1.0 km	MPC · JPL
726020	2009 QO_{75}	—	August 20, 2009	Kitt Peak	Spacewatch	·	880 m	MPC · JPL
726021	2009 QQ_{77}	—	August 18, 2009	Kitt Peak	Spacewatch	·	1.1 km	MPC · JPL
726022	2009 QK_{80}	—	August 16, 2009	Kitt Peak	Spacewatch	V	500 m	MPC · JPL
726023 Berényróbert	2009 RB_{1}	Berényróbert	September 10, 2009	Piszkéstető	K. Sárneczky	·	1.7 km	MPC · JPL
726024	2009 RH_{5}	—	September 1, 2005	Palomar	NEAT	·	1.2 km	MPC · JPL
726025	2009 RA_{10}	—	September 12, 2009	Kitt Peak	Spacewatch	EOS	1.7 km	MPC · JPL
726026	2009 RF_{24}	—	September 15, 2009	Kitt Peak	Spacewatch	·	630 m	MPC · JPL
726027	2009 RA_{40}	—	September 15, 2009	Kitt Peak	Spacewatch	·	1.3 km	MPC · JPL
726028	2009 RN_{53}	—	September 15, 2009	Kitt Peak	Spacewatch	·	3.1 km	MPC · JPL
726029	2009 RO_{54}	—	September 18, 2003	Kitt Peak	Spacewatch	·	4.0 km	MPC · JPL
726030	2009 RG_{60}	—	September 14, 2009	Catalina	CSS	·	930 m	MPC · JPL
726031	2009 RR_{61}	—	September 14, 2009	La Sagra	OAM	·	710 m	MPC · JPL
726032	2009 RM_{64}	—	September 15, 2009	Kitt Peak	Spacewatch	L4	5.9 km	MPC · JPL
726033	2009 RF_{68}	—	September 15, 2009	Kitt Peak	Spacewatch	L4	6.1 km	MPC · JPL
726034	2009 RN_{70}	—	September 12, 2009	Kitt Peak	Spacewatch	·	1.5 km	MPC · JPL
726035	2009 RO_{76}	—	October 2, 2009	Mount Lemmon	Mount Lemmon Survey	·	2.0 km	MPC · JPL
726036	2009 RR_{77}	—	February 23, 2012	Mount Lemmon	Mount Lemmon Survey	·	2.4 km	MPC · JPL
726037	2009 RK_{78}	—	September 15, 2009	Kitt Peak	Spacewatch	·	1.3 km	MPC · JPL
726038	2009 RK_{80}	—	September 15, 2009	Kitt Peak	Spacewatch	·	1.3 km	MPC · JPL
726039	2009 RB_{82}	—	September 15, 2009	Kitt Peak	Spacewatch	·	2.0 km	MPC · JPL
726040	2009 SS_{2}	—	October 9, 1999	Kitt Peak	Spacewatch	·	1.3 km	MPC · JPL
726041	2009 SC_{3}	—	August 29, 2009	Kitt Peak	Spacewatch	·	1.5 km	MPC · JPL
726042	2009 SN_{4}	—	September 16, 2009	Mount Lemmon	Mount Lemmon Survey	·	1.0 km	MPC · JPL
726043	2009 SQ_{10}	—	November 6, 2005	Kitt Peak	Spacewatch	·	1.3 km	MPC · JPL
726044	2009 SD_{14}	—	September 17, 2009	Zelenchukskaya	T. V. Krjačko, B. Satovski	·	3.5 km	MPC · JPL
726045	2009 SU_{14}	—	August 29, 2009	Kitt Peak	Spacewatch	NEM	1.8 km	MPC · JPL
726046	2009 SB_{21}	—	September 16, 2009	Goodricke-Pigott	R. A. Tucker	ERI	1.4 km	MPC · JPL
726047	2009 SF_{22}	—	November 26, 2003	Kitt Peak	Spacewatch	·	870 m	MPC · JPL
726048	2009 SB_{23}	—	December 25, 2003	Apache Point	SDSS Collaboration	·	960 m	MPC · JPL
726049	2009 SG_{30}	—	September 16, 2009	Kitt Peak	Spacewatch	EOS	1.4 km	MPC · JPL
726050	2009 SM_{33}	—	September 16, 2009	Kitt Peak	Spacewatch	·	850 m	MPC · JPL
726051	2009 ST_{52}	—	September 17, 2009	Mount Lemmon	Mount Lemmon Survey	·	1.4 km	MPC · JPL
726052	2009 SJ_{57}	—	September 17, 2009	Kitt Peak	Spacewatch	·	1.7 km	MPC · JPL
726053	2009 SD_{58}	—	September 17, 2009	Kitt Peak	Spacewatch	·	1.8 km	MPC · JPL
726054	2009 SB_{75}	—	September 17, 2009	Kitt Peak	Spacewatch	·	3.4 km	MPC · JPL
726055	2009 SH_{75}	—	September 17, 2009	Kitt Peak	Spacewatch	·	2.7 km	MPC · JPL
726056	2009 SR_{76}	—	September 17, 2009	Kitt Peak	Spacewatch	·	1.3 km	MPC · JPL
726057	2009 ST_{77}	—	September 17, 2009	Moletai	K. Černis, Zdanavicius, K.	·	2.1 km	MPC · JPL
726058	2009 SF_{79}	—	September 18, 2009	Kitt Peak	Spacewatch	·	1.6 km	MPC · JPL
726059	2009 SG_{81}	—	September 18, 2009	Mount Lemmon	Mount Lemmon Survey	KOR	1.2 km	MPC · JPL
726060	2009 SQ_{85}	—	March 10, 2007	Mount Lemmon	Mount Lemmon Survey	EOS	1.3 km	MPC · JPL
726061	2009 SV_{85}	—	August 27, 2009	Kitt Peak	Spacewatch	·	1.5 km	MPC · JPL
726062	2009 SP_{92}	—	September 16, 2009	Kitt Peak	Spacewatch	·	1.8 km	MPC · JPL
726063	2009 SL_{96}	—	February 8, 2003	Haleakala	NEAT	·	1.6 km	MPC · JPL
726064	2009 SW_{111}	—	September 18, 2009	Kitt Peak	Spacewatch	·	2.1 km	MPC · JPL
726065	2009 SK_{113}	—	September 18, 2009	Kitt Peak	Spacewatch	·	1.7 km	MPC · JPL
726066	2009 SX_{113}	—	September 18, 2009	Kitt Peak	Spacewatch	·	1.1 km	MPC · JPL
726067	2009 SJ_{117}	—	September 18, 2009	Kitt Peak	Spacewatch	EOS	1.6 km	MPC · JPL
726068	2009 SN_{117}	—	September 18, 2009	Kitt Peak	Spacewatch	·	750 m	MPC · JPL
726069	2009 SG_{123}	—	August 25, 2004	Kitt Peak	Spacewatch	·	1.5 km	MPC · JPL
726070	2009 SU_{123}	—	September 18, 2009	Kitt Peak	Spacewatch	·	2.5 km	MPC · JPL
726071	2009 SM_{127}	—	September 18, 2009	Kitt Peak	Spacewatch	·	2.5 km	MPC · JPL
726072	2009 SN_{130}	—	September 18, 2009	Kitt Peak	Spacewatch	MAS	520 m	MPC · JPL
726073	2009 SM_{133}	—	September 18, 2009	Kitt Peak	Spacewatch	·	1.4 km	MPC · JPL
726074	2009 SB_{135}	—	March 16, 2007	Kitt Peak	Spacewatch	·	1.2 km	MPC · JPL
726075	2009 SG_{137}	—	September 18, 2009	Kitt Peak	Spacewatch	·	2.5 km	MPC · JPL
726076	2009 ST_{145}	—	December 27, 2006	Charleston	R. Holmes	·	780 m	MPC · JPL
726077	2009 SB_{146}	—	September 19, 2009	Mount Lemmon	Mount Lemmon Survey	MAS	550 m	MPC · JPL
726078	2009 SK_{147}	—	September 19, 2009	Mount Lemmon	Mount Lemmon Survey	·	1.4 km	MPC · JPL
726079	2009 SD_{160}	—	September 20, 2009	Kitt Peak	Spacewatch	·	1.9 km	MPC · JPL
726080	2009 SG_{162}	—	January 26, 2006	Kitt Peak	Spacewatch	·	2.0 km	MPC · JPL
726081	2009 SF_{163}	—	September 21, 2009	Mount Lemmon	Mount Lemmon Survey	·	1.6 km	MPC · JPL
726082	2009 ST_{165}	—	August 16, 2009	Kitt Peak	Spacewatch	NYS	970 m	MPC · JPL
726083	2009 SR_{168}	—	September 20, 2009	Mount Lemmon	Mount Lemmon Survey	·	2.3 km	MPC · JPL
726084	2009 SF_{180}	—	September 20, 2009	Kitt Peak	Spacewatch	PHO	3.2 km	MPC · JPL
726085	2009 SY_{183}	—	September 21, 2009	Kitt Peak	Spacewatch	·	1.4 km	MPC · JPL
726086	2009 SD_{184}	—	September 21, 2009	Kitt Peak	Spacewatch	·	1.3 km	MPC · JPL
726087	2009 SU_{185}	—	September 21, 2009	Kitt Peak	Spacewatch	KOR	1.2 km	MPC · JPL
726088	2009 SC_{195}	—	September 22, 2009	Kitt Peak	Spacewatch	·	710 m	MPC · JPL
726089	2009 SL_{202}	—	September 22, 2009	Kitt Peak	Spacewatch	·	1.6 km	MPC · JPL
726090	2009 SJ_{205}	—	August 15, 2004	Cerro Tololo	Deep Ecliptic Survey	HOF	1.9 km	MPC · JPL
726091	2009 SB_{212}	—	September 15, 2009	Kitt Peak	Spacewatch	·	1.3 km	MPC · JPL
726092	2009 SN_{219}	—	September 24, 2009	Mount Lemmon	Mount Lemmon Survey	·	2.1 km	MPC · JPL
726093	2009 SH_{221}	—	September 25, 2009	Mount Lemmon	Mount Lemmon Survey	·	950 m	MPC · JPL
726094	2009 SE_{225}	—	September 25, 2009	Mount Lemmon	Mount Lemmon Survey	·	690 m	MPC · JPL
726095	2009 SA_{226}	—	September 26, 2009	Mount Lemmon	Mount Lemmon Survey	·	580 m	MPC · JPL
726096	2009 SK_{226}	—	March 12, 2007	Mount Lemmon	Mount Lemmon Survey	·	3.1 km	MPC · JPL
726097	2009 SS_{244}	—	September 17, 2009	Kitt Peak	Spacewatch	·	1.4 km	MPC · JPL
726098	2009 SC_{247}	—	September 18, 2009	Kitt Peak	Spacewatch	L4	6.6 km	MPC · JPL
726099	2009 SH_{247}	—	September 18, 2009	Kitt Peak	Spacewatch	L4	11 km	MPC · JPL
726100	2009 SU_{248}	—	September 16, 2009	Kitt Peak	Spacewatch	AGN	850 m	MPC · JPL

== 726101–726200 ==
back to top

Designation			Discovery			Properties		Ref
Permanent	Provisional	Named after	Date	Site	Discoverer(s)	Category	Diam.	Ref
726101	2009 SP_{249}	—	September 18, 2009	Kitt Peak	Spacewatch	·	1.4 km	MPC · JPL
726102	2009 SK_{252}	—	April 15, 2008	Kitt Peak	Spacewatch	·	1.6 km	MPC · JPL
726103	2009 SS_{258}	—	September 21, 2009	Kitt Peak	Spacewatch	DOR	2.3 km	MPC · JPL
726104	2009 SV_{259}	—	September 22, 2009	Mount Lemmon	Mount Lemmon Survey	·	2.3 km	MPC · JPL
726105	2009 SX_{259}	—	August 20, 2009	Kitt Peak	Spacewatch	·	3.1 km	MPC · JPL
726106	2009 SD_{268}	—	September 12, 2009	Kitt Peak	Spacewatch	HOF	1.9 km	MPC · JPL
726107	2009 SV_{270}	—	September 24, 2009	Kitt Peak	Spacewatch	·	1.1 km	MPC · JPL
726108	2009 SX_{270}	—	September 17, 2009	Kitt Peak	Spacewatch	·	2.3 km	MPC · JPL
726109	2009 SL_{272}	—	September 16, 2009	Kitt Peak	Spacewatch	L4	8.6 km	MPC · JPL
726110	2009 ST_{276}	—	January 5, 2006	Kitt Peak	Spacewatch	·	1.5 km	MPC · JPL
726111	2009 SV_{278}	—	September 17, 2009	Kitt Peak	Spacewatch	·	1.3 km	MPC · JPL
726112	2009 SA_{279}	—	September 25, 2009	Kitt Peak	Spacewatch	·	830 m	MPC · JPL
726113	2009 SR_{294}	—	August 18, 2009	Kitt Peak	Spacewatch	MAR	960 m	MPC · JPL
726114	2009 SX_{294}	—	September 19, 2009	Kitt Peak	Spacewatch	·	870 m	MPC · JPL
726115	2009 SP_{305}	—	September 17, 2009	Mount Lemmon	Mount Lemmon Survey	·	2.3 km	MPC · JPL
726116	2009 SX_{306}	—	September 17, 2009	Mount Lemmon	Mount Lemmon Survey	·	620 m	MPC · JPL
726117	2009 SQ_{307}	—	September 17, 2009	Mount Lemmon	Mount Lemmon Survey	·	1.6 km	MPC · JPL
726118	2009 SF_{310}	—	September 18, 2009	Kitt Peak	Spacewatch	·	2.2 km	MPC · JPL
726119	2009 SO_{311}	—	September 18, 2009	Mount Lemmon	Mount Lemmon Survey	3:2	3.8 km	MPC · JPL
726120	2009 SQ_{313}	—	September 18, 2009	Mount Lemmon	Mount Lemmon Survey	·	1.6 km	MPC · JPL
726121	2009 SE_{314}	—	July 4, 2005	Kitt Peak	Spacewatch	·	930 m	MPC · JPL
726122	2009 SE_{316}	—	September 19, 2009	Kitt Peak	Spacewatch	·	1.8 km	MPC · JPL
726123	2009 SP_{316}	—	September 19, 2009	Mount Lemmon	Mount Lemmon Survey	V	600 m	MPC · JPL
726124	2009 SK_{322}	—	February 21, 2007	Kitt Peak	Deep Ecliptic Survey	·	1.4 km	MPC · JPL
726125	2009 SR_{327}	—	September 26, 2009	Kitt Peak	Spacewatch	·	1.6 km	MPC · JPL
726126	2009 SP_{332}	—	September 21, 2009	Mount Lemmon	Mount Lemmon Survey	·	1.4 km	MPC · JPL
726127	2009 SJ_{338}	—	October 16, 2009	Mount Lemmon	Mount Lemmon Survey	·	1.7 km	MPC · JPL
726128	2009 SE_{350}	—	September 21, 2009	Mount Lemmon	Mount Lemmon Survey	EMA	4.0 km	MPC · JPL
726129	2009 SC_{358}	—	September 27, 2009	Mount Lemmon	Mount Lemmon Survey	·	5.1 km	MPC · JPL
726130	2009 SB_{366}	—	October 16, 2003	Kitt Peak	Spacewatch	·	2.8 km	MPC · JPL
726131	2009 SO_{372}	—	September 18, 1995	Kitt Peak	Spacewatch	·	1.4 km	MPC · JPL
726132	2009 SN_{373}	—	September 29, 2014	Haleakala	Pan-STARRS 1	·	2.0 km	MPC · JPL
726133	2009 SQ_{373}	—	November 28, 2013	Mount Lemmon	Mount Lemmon Survey	·	1.1 km	MPC · JPL
726134	2009 SA_{374}	—	September 23, 2009	Mount Lemmon	Mount Lemmon Survey	PHO	740 m	MPC · JPL
726135	2009 SN_{374}	—	July 5, 2013	Siding Spring	SSS	·	1.8 km	MPC · JPL
726136	2009 SR_{374}	—	February 10, 2011	Mount Lemmon	Mount Lemmon Survey	·	820 m	MPC · JPL
726137	2009 SL_{375}	—	January 8, 2011	Mount Lemmon	Mount Lemmon Survey	·	810 m	MPC · JPL
726138	2009 SE_{376}	—	September 20, 2009	Kitt Peak	Spacewatch	V	480 m	MPC · JPL
726139	2009 SP_{377}	—	September 16, 2009	Mount Lemmon	Mount Lemmon Survey	·	1.5 km	MPC · JPL
726140	2009 SU_{377}	—	March 15, 2012	Mount Lemmon	Mount Lemmon Survey	·	2.0 km	MPC · JPL
726141	2009 SM_{378}	—	May 12, 1997	Mauna Kea	Veillet, C.	·	1.0 km	MPC · JPL
726142	2009 SY_{382}	—	September 29, 2009	Kitt Peak	Spacewatch	MAS	710 m	MPC · JPL
726143	2009 SZ_{382}	—	September 19, 2009	Mount Lemmon	Mount Lemmon Survey	·	1.7 km	MPC · JPL
726144	2009 SO_{383}	—	March 22, 2015	Haleakala	Pan-STARRS 1	·	590 m	MPC · JPL
726145	2009 SR_{383}	—	September 25, 2009	Kitt Peak	Spacewatch	·	1.2 km	MPC · JPL
726146	2009 SO_{386}	—	March 18, 2016	Mount Lemmon	Mount Lemmon Survey	·	1.4 km	MPC · JPL
726147	2009 SS_{389}	—	September 20, 2009	Kitt Peak	Spacewatch	·	960 m	MPC · JPL
726148	2009 SB_{390}	—	February 12, 2011	Mount Lemmon	Mount Lemmon Survey	NYS	970 m	MPC · JPL
726149	2009 SY_{390}	—	July 31, 2014	Haleakala	Pan-STARRS 1	EOS	1.3 km	MPC · JPL
726150	2009 SZ_{390}	—	July 12, 2016	Mount Lemmon	Mount Lemmon Survey	·	1.0 km	MPC · JPL
726151	2009 SQ_{391}	—	January 10, 2013	Haleakala	Pan-STARRS 1	L4	6.2 km	MPC · JPL
726152	2009 SP_{392}	—	July 14, 2013	Haleakala	Pan-STARRS 1	WIT	760 m	MPC · JPL
726153	2009 SS_{396}	—	September 20, 2009	Kitt Peak	Spacewatch	AGN	920 m	MPC · JPL
726154	2009 SB_{398}	—	September 27, 2009	Kitt Peak	Spacewatch	·	1.7 km	MPC · JPL
726155	2009 SM_{398}	—	September 19, 2009	Kitt Peak	Spacewatch	3:2 · (3561)	5.0 km	MPC · JPL
726156	2009 SS_{398}	—	September 20, 2009	Mount Lemmon	Mount Lemmon Survey	·	630 m	MPC · JPL
726157	2009 SY_{398}	—	September 21, 2009	Mount Lemmon	Mount Lemmon Survey	·	1.3 km	MPC · JPL
726158	2009 SQ_{399}	—	September 20, 2009	Mount Lemmon	Mount Lemmon Survey	EOS	1.4 km	MPC · JPL
726159	2009 SS_{399}	—	September 28, 2009	Mount Lemmon	Mount Lemmon Survey	·	1.5 km	MPC · JPL
726160	2009 SY_{399}	—	September 25, 2009	Kitt Peak	Spacewatch	EOS	1.7 km	MPC · JPL
726161	2009 SC_{401}	—	September 27, 2009	Mount Lemmon	Mount Lemmon Survey	·	1.0 km	MPC · JPL
726162	2009 SD_{401}	—	September 19, 2009	Kitt Peak	Spacewatch	·	910 m	MPC · JPL
726163	2009 SK_{401}	—	September 21, 2009	Mount Lemmon	Mount Lemmon Survey	·	2.6 km	MPC · JPL
726164	2009 ST_{401}	—	September 19, 2009	Kitt Peak	Spacewatch	·	2.0 km	MPC · JPL
726165	2009 SQ_{403}	—	September 17, 2009	Kitt Peak	Spacewatch	·	890 m	MPC · JPL
726166	2009 SW_{403}	—	February 21, 2007	Kitt Peak	Spacewatch	·	950 m	MPC · JPL
726167	2009 SZ_{403}	—	September 19, 2009	Mount Lemmon	Mount Lemmon Survey	T_{j} (2.99)	3.2 km	MPC · JPL
726168	2009 SC_{404}	—	September 21, 2009	Kitt Peak	Spacewatch	L4	5.9 km	MPC · JPL
726169	2009 SZ_{407}	—	September 21, 2009	Kitt Peak	Spacewatch	·	870 m	MPC · JPL
726170	2009 SM_{408}	—	September 28, 2009	Mount Lemmon	Mount Lemmon Survey	V	520 m	MPC · JPL
726171	2009 SV_{414}	—	September 28, 2009	Mount Lemmon	Mount Lemmon Survey	·	1.4 km	MPC · JPL
726172	2009 SJ_{419}	—	September 24, 2009	Mount Lemmon	Mount Lemmon Survey	L4	6.1 km	MPC · JPL
726173	2009 SM_{419}	—	September 25, 2009	Mount Lemmon	Mount Lemmon Survey	L4	6.7 km	MPC · JPL
726174	2009 SS_{420}	—	September 22, 2009	Kitt Peak	Spacewatch	·	1.2 km	MPC · JPL
726175	2009 SZ_{421}	—	September 21, 2009	Mount Lemmon	Mount Lemmon Survey	·	1.7 km	MPC · JPL
726176	2009 SY_{427}	—	September 27, 2009	Kitt Peak	Spacewatch	KOR	1.1 km	MPC · JPL
726177	2009 TG_{17}	—	October 15, 2009	La Sagra	OAM	·	2.4 km	MPC · JPL
726178	2009 TR_{17}	—	September 24, 2009	Catalina	CSS	·	2.3 km	MPC · JPL
726179	2009 TF_{25}	—	October 14, 2009	Catalina	CSS	·	3.0 km	MPC · JPL
726180	2009 TL_{25}	—	September 15, 2009	Kitt Peak	Spacewatch	·	1.3 km	MPC · JPL
726181	2009 TZ_{26}	—	October 14, 2009	La Sagra	OAM	·	1.9 km	MPC · JPL
726182	2009 TA_{29}	—	September 20, 2009	Kitt Peak	Spacewatch	·	860 m	MPC · JPL
726183	2009 TM_{31}	—	October 15, 2009	Mount Lemmon	Mount Lemmon Survey	·	550 m	MPC · JPL
726184	2009 TF_{44}	—	October 14, 2009	Mount Lemmon	Mount Lemmon Survey	·	1.1 km	MPC · JPL
726185	2009 TP_{48}	—	August 25, 2005	Palomar	NEAT	·	990 m	MPC · JPL
726186	2009 TH_{50}	—	October 12, 2009	Mount Lemmon	Mount Lemmon Survey	·	2.6 km	MPC · JPL
726187	2009 TM_{50}	—	August 5, 2010	WISE	WISE	·	3.5 km	MPC · JPL
726188	2009 TV_{50}	—	October 15, 2004	Mount Lemmon	Mount Lemmon Survey	·	2.1 km	MPC · JPL
726189	2009 TZ_{50}	—	November 27, 2013	Haleakala	Pan-STARRS 1	·	970 m	MPC · JPL
726190	2009 TK_{53}	—	October 14, 2009	Mount Lemmon	Mount Lemmon Survey	·	1.4 km	MPC · JPL
726191	2009 TJ_{54}	—	October 12, 2009	Kitt Peak	Spacewatch	·	1.1 km	MPC · JPL
726192	2009 TT_{54}	—	October 1, 2009	Mount Lemmon	Mount Lemmon Survey	·	1.4 km	MPC · JPL
726193	2009 TL_{55}	—	October 12, 2009	Mount Lemmon	Mount Lemmon Survey	VER	2.7 km	MPC · JPL
726194	2009 TX_{56}	—	October 14, 2009	Mount Lemmon	Mount Lemmon Survey	·	1.3 km	MPC · JPL
726195	2009 UP	—	October 17, 2009	Tzec Maun	Shurpakov, S.	·	680 m	MPC · JPL
726196	2009 UP_{1}	—	October 18, 2009	Catalina	CSS	APO	620 m	MPC · JPL
726197	2009 UN_{6}	—	September 15, 2009	Kitt Peak	Spacewatch	·	1.7 km	MPC · JPL
726198	2009 UF_{11}	—	March 16, 2007	Kitt Peak	Spacewatch	·	2.7 km	MPC · JPL
726199	2009 UD_{15}	—	October 16, 2009	Mount Lemmon	Mount Lemmon Survey	L4	6.3 km	MPC · JPL
726200	2009 UT_{22}	—	October 17, 2009	Mount Lemmon	Mount Lemmon Survey	HOF	2.0 km	MPC · JPL

== 726201–726300 ==
back to top

Designation			Discovery			Properties		Ref
Permanent	Provisional	Named after	Date	Site	Discoverer(s)	Category	Diam.	Ref
726201	2009 UE_{27}	—	October 21, 2009	Catalina	CSS	PHO	970 m	MPC · JPL
726202	2009 UR_{30}	—	September 21, 2009	Mount Lemmon	Mount Lemmon Survey	·	3.1 km	MPC · JPL
726203	2009 UD_{32}	—	September 18, 2009	Mount Lemmon	Mount Lemmon Survey	NYS	970 m	MPC · JPL
726204	2009 UN_{44}	—	October 18, 2009	Mount Lemmon	Mount Lemmon Survey	THM	1.7 km	MPC · JPL
726205	2009 UP_{44}	—	September 26, 2003	Apache Point	SDSS Collaboration	VER	2.5 km	MPC · JPL
726206	2009 UW_{45}	—	October 18, 2009	Mount Lemmon	Mount Lemmon Survey	·	2.0 km	MPC · JPL
726207	2009 UV_{48}	—	October 14, 2009	Mount Lemmon	Mount Lemmon Survey	·	1.3 km	MPC · JPL
726208	2009 UM_{58}	—	October 23, 2009	Mount Lemmon	Mount Lemmon Survey	·	2.6 km	MPC · JPL
726209	2009 UV_{65}	—	March 9, 2002	Kitt Peak	Spacewatch	L4	6.5 km	MPC · JPL
726210	2009 US_{67}	—	November 3, 2005	Mount Lemmon	Mount Lemmon Survey	·	1.1 km	MPC · JPL
726211	2009 UU_{70}	—	September 29, 2009	Mount Lemmon	Mount Lemmon Survey	EOS	1.6 km	MPC · JPL
726212	2009 UX_{71}	—	October 23, 2009	Kitt Peak	Spacewatch	·	1.4 km	MPC · JPL
726213	2009 UD_{75}	—	September 28, 2009	Kitt Peak	Spacewatch	·	2.5 km	MPC · JPL
726214	2009 UP_{80}	—	February 21, 2007	Mount Lemmon	Mount Lemmon Survey	NYS	850 m	MPC · JPL
726215	2009 UB_{81}	—	October 22, 2009	Mount Lemmon	Mount Lemmon Survey	V	500 m	MPC · JPL
726216	2009 UC_{92}	—	October 24, 2009	Sandlot	G. Hug	MAR	2.5 km	MPC · JPL
726217	2009 UA_{95}	—	September 27, 2009	Kitt Peak	Spacewatch	MAS	600 m	MPC · JPL
726218	2009 UO_{97}	—	October 23, 2009	Mount Lemmon	Mount Lemmon Survey	·	2.0 km	MPC · JPL
726219	2009 UT_{100}	—	October 23, 2009	Mount Lemmon	Mount Lemmon Survey	·	560 m	MPC · JPL
726220	2009 UU_{111}	—	October 2, 2009	Mount Lemmon	Mount Lemmon Survey	·	2.1 km	MPC · JPL
726221	2009 UV_{114}	—	October 21, 2009	Mount Lemmon	Mount Lemmon Survey	·	1.0 km	MPC · JPL
726222	2009 UJ_{122}	—	September 27, 2009	Mount Lemmon	Mount Lemmon Survey	·	3.6 km	MPC · JPL
726223	2009 UK_{122}	—	October 27, 2005	Kitt Peak	Spacewatch	·	830 m	MPC · JPL
726224	2009 UH_{123}	—	March 23, 2001	Kitt Peak	Spacewatch	·	3.0 km	MPC · JPL
726225	2009 UD_{125}	—	October 26, 2009	Mount Lemmon	Mount Lemmon Survey	·	980 m	MPC · JPL
726226	2009 UK_{125}	—	March 20, 2007	Kitt Peak	Spacewatch	EOS	1.8 km	MPC · JPL
726227	2009 UW_{126}	—	October 21, 2009	Zelenchukskaya Stn	T. V. Krjačko, Satovski, B.	·	2.2 km	MPC · JPL
726228	2009 UA_{127}	—	October 13, 2009	La Sagra	OAM	·	3.8 km	MPC · JPL
726229	2009 UZ_{127}	—	October 24, 2009	Kitt Peak	Spacewatch	·	3.0 km	MPC · JPL
726230	2009 UF_{129}	—	October 30, 2009	Mount Lemmon	Mount Lemmon Survey	·	3.1 km	MPC · JPL
726231	2009 UH_{130}	—	October 20, 2009	San Pedro de Atacama	J. L. Ortiz	·	2.2 km	MPC · JPL
726232	2009 UN_{133}	—	October 22, 2009	Mount Lemmon	Mount Lemmon Survey	·	1.3 km	MPC · JPL
726233	2009 US_{134}	—	July 29, 2005	Palomar	NEAT	NYS	810 m	MPC · JPL
726234	2009 UL_{145}	—	October 17, 2009	Catalina	CSS	L4	9.5 km	MPC · JPL
726235	2009 UM_{147}	—	October 22, 2009	Kitt Peak	Spacewatch	·	4.2 km	MPC · JPL
726236	2009 UD_{150}	—	October 27, 2009	Mount Lemmon	Mount Lemmon Survey	·	2.9 km	MPC · JPL
726237	2009 UE_{150}	—	October 27, 2009	Mount Lemmon	Mount Lemmon Survey	·	2.3 km	MPC · JPL
726238	2009 UH_{156}	—	October 18, 2009	Mount Lemmon	Mount Lemmon Survey	V	450 m	MPC · JPL
726239	2009 UZ_{156}	—	October 25, 2009	Kitt Peak	Spacewatch	·	1.7 km	MPC · JPL
726240	2009 UJ_{162}	—	October 21, 2009	Mount Lemmon	Mount Lemmon Survey	·	2.5 km	MPC · JPL
726241	2009 UR_{162}	—	March 29, 2012	Haleakala	Pan-STARRS 1	EOS	1.3 km	MPC · JPL
726242	2009 UZ_{162}	—	March 2, 2011	Mount Lemmon	Mount Lemmon Survey	V	540 m	MPC · JPL
726243	2009 UD_{163}	—	May 21, 2015	Haleakala	Pan-STARRS 1	(2076)	690 m	MPC · JPL
726244	2009 UK_{163}	—	October 24, 2009	Mount Lemmon	Mount Lemmon Survey	EOS	1.8 km	MPC · JPL
726245	2009 UT_{163}	—	February 28, 2012	Haleakala	Pan-STARRS 1	EMA	2.4 km	MPC · JPL
726246	2009 UG_{164}	—	September 2, 2014	Haleakala	Pan-STARRS 1	·	2.0 km	MPC · JPL
726247	2009 UH_{164}	—	October 18, 2009	Mount Lemmon	Mount Lemmon Survey	HOF	2.4 km	MPC · JPL
726248	2009 UX_{164}	—	September 19, 2009	Kitt Peak	Spacewatch	·	910 m	MPC · JPL
726249	2009 UG_{166}	—	October 18, 2009	Mount Lemmon	Mount Lemmon Survey	·	4.8 km	MPC · JPL
726250	2009 UR_{166}	—	October 14, 2009	Kitt Peak	Spacewatch	·	1.3 km	MPC · JPL
726251	2009 US_{166}	—	November 8, 2013	Kitt Peak	Spacewatch	·	1.1 km	MPC · JPL
726252	2009 UG_{167}	—	October 26, 2009	Mount Lemmon	Mount Lemmon Survey	·	780 m	MPC · JPL
726253	2009 UY_{168}	—	November 17, 2014	Haleakala	Pan-STARRS 1	PAD	1.3 km	MPC · JPL
726254	2009 UB_{170}	—	October 16, 2009	Mount Lemmon	Mount Lemmon Survey	·	1.3 km	MPC · JPL
726255	2009 UX_{170}	—	October 18, 2009	Mount Lemmon	Mount Lemmon Survey	·	1.0 km	MPC · JPL
726256	2009 UB_{171}	—	October 16, 2009	Mount Lemmon	Mount Lemmon Survey	·	2.3 km	MPC · JPL
726257	2009 UN_{172}	—	September 19, 2014	Haleakala	Pan-STARRS 1	·	1.8 km	MPC · JPL
726258	2009 UT_{172}	—	September 27, 2014	Mount Lemmon	Mount Lemmon Survey	VER	2.0 km	MPC · JPL
726259	2009 UD_{175}	—	October 23, 2009	Mount Lemmon	Mount Lemmon Survey	·	2.1 km	MPC · JPL
726260	2009 UG_{175}	—	October 22, 2009	Mount Lemmon	Mount Lemmon Survey	HOF	2.2 km	MPC · JPL
726261	2009 UU_{175}	—	October 24, 2009	Kitt Peak	Spacewatch	EOS	1.3 km	MPC · JPL
726262	2009 UN_{176}	—	October 27, 2009	Mount Lemmon	Mount Lemmon Survey	·	1.0 km	MPC · JPL
726263	2009 UU_{176}	—	October 16, 2009	Mount Lemmon	Mount Lemmon Survey	·	740 m	MPC · JPL
726264	2009 UB_{177}	—	March 10, 2007	Mount Lemmon	Mount Lemmon Survey	MAS	550 m	MPC · JPL
726265	2009 UJ_{178}	—	October 16, 2009	Mount Lemmon	Mount Lemmon Survey	KOR	1.2 km	MPC · JPL
726266	2009 UH_{179}	—	October 16, 2009	Mount Lemmon	Mount Lemmon Survey	·	450 m	MPC · JPL
726267	2009 UC_{181}	—	October 27, 2009	Mount Lemmon	Mount Lemmon Survey	·	2.4 km	MPC · JPL
726268	2009 UB_{182}	—	October 24, 2009	Kitt Peak	Spacewatch	·	1.0 km	MPC · JPL
726269	2009 UY_{184}	—	October 24, 2009	Kitt Peak	Spacewatch	AGN	900 m	MPC · JPL
726270	2009 UE_{189}	—	October 27, 2009	Mount Lemmon	Mount Lemmon Survey	L4	6.3 km	MPC · JPL
726271	2009 VO_{1}	—	November 9, 2009	Tzec Maun	Nevski, V.	·	2.9 km	MPC · JPL
726272	2009 VN_{2}	—	September 19, 2003	Palomar	NEAT	THB	4.7 km	MPC · JPL
726273	2009 VC_{4}	—	May 19, 2006	Mount Lemmon	Mount Lemmon Survey	·	4.6 km	MPC · JPL
726274	2009 VJ_{4}	—	April 13, 2001	Kitt Peak	Spacewatch	EOS	2.3 km	MPC · JPL
726275	2009 VG_{7}	—	October 26, 2009	Mount Lemmon	Mount Lemmon Survey	·	2.1 km	MPC · JPL
726276	2009 VQ_{7}	—	September 18, 2009	Mount Lemmon	Mount Lemmon Survey	·	950 m	MPC · JPL
726277	2009 VK_{9}	—	November 8, 2009	Mount Lemmon	Mount Lemmon Survey	·	1.4 km	MPC · JPL
726278	2009 VH_{10}	—	April 10, 2000	Kitt Peak	M. W. Buie	·	2.5 km	MPC · JPL
726279	2009 VU_{15}	—	October 24, 2009	Kitt Peak	Spacewatch	·	890 m	MPC · JPL
726280	2009 VH_{17}	—	October 24, 2009	Catalina	CSS	·	3.0 km	MPC · JPL
726281	2009 VX_{17}	—	October 26, 2009	Kitt Peak	Spacewatch	EOS	1.6 km	MPC · JPL
726282	2009 VD_{19}	—	November 9, 2009	Kitt Peak	Spacewatch	·	2.4 km	MPC · JPL
726283	2009 VZ_{22}	—	November 9, 2009	Mount Lemmon	Mount Lemmon Survey	·	1.9 km	MPC · JPL
726284	2009 VH_{30}	—	November 9, 2009	Mount Lemmon	Mount Lemmon Survey	·	3.4 km	MPC · JPL
726285	2009 VJ_{31}	—	November 9, 2009	Mount Lemmon	Mount Lemmon Survey	·	1.7 km	MPC · JPL
726286	2009 VC_{34}	—	November 10, 2009	Mount Lemmon	Mount Lemmon Survey	·	2.5 km	MPC · JPL
726287	2009 VE_{34}	—	October 24, 2009	Kitt Peak	Spacewatch	·	1.5 km	MPC · JPL
726288	2009 VP_{36}	—	November 10, 2009	Kitt Peak	Spacewatch	KOR	1.2 km	MPC · JPL
726289	2009 VP_{38}	—	November 9, 2009	Kitt Peak	Spacewatch	TIR	2.1 km	MPC · JPL
726290	2009 VE_{51}	—	November 26, 2005	Kitt Peak	Spacewatch	·	1.5 km	MPC · JPL
726291	2009 VL_{51}	—	October 26, 2009	Mount Lemmon	Mount Lemmon Survey	·	3.2 km	MPC · JPL
726292	2009 VT_{53}	—	November 10, 2009	Mount Lemmon	Mount Lemmon Survey	KOR	1.1 km	MPC · JPL
726293	2009 VW_{53}	—	November 10, 2009	Mount Lemmon	Mount Lemmon Survey	·	570 m	MPC · JPL
726294	2009 VV_{56}	—	September 22, 2009	Mount Lemmon	Mount Lemmon Survey	·	1.0 km	MPC · JPL
726295	2009 VX_{56}	—	November 11, 2009	Mount Lemmon	Mount Lemmon Survey	KON	1.5 km	MPC · JPL
726296	2009 VN_{67}	—	October 22, 2009	Mount Lemmon	Mount Lemmon Survey	·	3.0 km	MPC · JPL
726297	2009 VK_{73}	—	September 18, 2003	Palomar	NEAT	EOS	1.9 km	MPC · JPL
726298	2009 VT_{77}	—	September 18, 2003	Palomar	NEAT	·	3.3 km	MPC · JPL
726299	2009 VH_{86}	—	October 16, 2009	Mount Lemmon	Mount Lemmon Survey	·	3.5 km	MPC · JPL
726300	2009 VV_{97}	—	November 9, 2009	Kitt Peak	Spacewatch	·	1.7 km	MPC · JPL

== 726301–726400 ==
back to top

Designation			Discovery			Properties		Ref
Permanent	Provisional	Named after	Date	Site	Discoverer(s)	Category	Diam.	Ref
726301	2009 VW_{98}	—	November 9, 2009	Mount Lemmon	Mount Lemmon Survey	·	1.5 km	MPC · JPL
726302	2009 VO_{99}	—	November 9, 2009	Kitt Peak	Spacewatch	·	2.1 km	MPC · JPL
726303	2009 VV_{101}	—	November 11, 2009	Kitt Peak	Spacewatch	EOS	3.3 km	MPC · JPL
726304	2009 VZ_{114}	—	July 29, 2003	Haleakala	NEAT	·	5.0 km	MPC · JPL
726305	2009 VC_{121}	—	February 8, 2011	Catalina	CSS	TIR	2.6 km	MPC · JPL
726306	2009 VG_{122}	—	November 10, 2009	Kitt Peak	Spacewatch	·	1.2 km	MPC · JPL
726307	2009 VZ_{124}	—	November 8, 2009	Mount Lemmon	Mount Lemmon Survey	AGN	790 m	MPC · JPL
726308	2009 VM_{128}	—	November 8, 2009	Mount Lemmon	Mount Lemmon Survey	·	3.4 km	MPC · JPL
726309	2009 VP_{129}	—	November 8, 2009	Mount Lemmon	Mount Lemmon Survey	·	2.0 km	MPC · JPL
726310	2009 VB_{132}	—	November 8, 2009	Mount Lemmon	Mount Lemmon Survey	·	1.2 km	MPC · JPL
726311	2009 WV	—	October 26, 2009	Mount Lemmon	Mount Lemmon Survey	·	4.8 km	MPC · JPL
726312	2009 WO_{2}	—	October 22, 2009	Mount Lemmon	Mount Lemmon Survey	·	1.5 km	MPC · JPL
726313	2009 WS_{2}	—	November 16, 2009	Mount Lemmon	Mount Lemmon Survey	·	1.3 km	MPC · JPL
726314	2009 WZ_{2}	—	October 22, 2009	Mount Lemmon	Mount Lemmon Survey	KOR	1.1 km	MPC · JPL
726315	2009 WM_{4}	—	October 18, 2009	Mount Lemmon	Mount Lemmon Survey	·	2.1 km	MPC · JPL
726316	2009 WH_{5}	—	November 16, 2009	Mount Lemmon	Mount Lemmon Survey	NYS	880 m	MPC · JPL
726317	2009 WV_{9}	—	September 19, 2009	Mount Lemmon	Mount Lemmon Survey	·	2.0 km	MPC · JPL
726318	2009 WS_{11}	—	November 16, 2009	Mount Lemmon	Mount Lemmon Survey	L4	7.5 km	MPC · JPL
726319	2009 WF_{13}	—	November 16, 2009	Mount Lemmon	Mount Lemmon Survey	·	1.8 km	MPC · JPL
726320	2009 WK_{13}	—	October 14, 2009	Mount Lemmon	Mount Lemmon Survey	·	2.9 km	MPC · JPL
726321	2009 WC_{16}	—	September 16, 2009	Kitt Peak	Spacewatch	L4	11 km	MPC · JPL
726322	2009 WK_{19}	—	November 9, 2009	Mount Lemmon	Mount Lemmon Survey	·	4.6 km	MPC · JPL
726323	2009 WU_{19}	—	November 17, 2009	Kitt Peak	Spacewatch	L4	11 km	MPC · JPL
726324	2009 WN_{23}	—	November 18, 2009	Kitt Peak	Spacewatch	EUP	4.1 km	MPC · JPL
726325	2009 WH_{25}	—	November 20, 2009	Mount Lemmon	Mount Lemmon Survey	·	2.8 km	MPC · JPL
726326	2009 WV_{29}	—	November 16, 2009	Mount Lemmon	Mount Lemmon Survey	·	780 m	MPC · JPL
726327	2009 WT_{30}	—	November 16, 2009	Kitt Peak	Spacewatch	·	2.3 km	MPC · JPL
726328	2009 WR_{36}	—	November 17, 2009	La Silla	La Silla	·	890 m	MPC · JPL
726329	2009 WN_{38}	—	November 17, 2009	Kitt Peak	Spacewatch	·	1.6 km	MPC · JPL
726330	2009 WV_{39}	—	November 17, 2009	Kitt Peak	Spacewatch	·	1.7 km	MPC · JPL
726331	2009 WA_{48}	—	September 21, 2003	Kitt Peak	Spacewatch	·	3.8 km	MPC · JPL
726332	2009 WH_{51}	—	November 20, 2009	Mount Lemmon	Mount Lemmon Survey	·	2.8 km	MPC · JPL
726333	2009 WG_{55}	—	September 1, 2005	Kitt Peak	Spacewatch	·	810 m	MPC · JPL
726334	2009 WH_{55}	—	August 21, 2001	Kitt Peak	Spacewatch	·	3.9 km	MPC · JPL
726335	2009 WZ_{55}	—	September 19, 2009	Mount Lemmon	Mount Lemmon Survey	EOS	1.5 km	MPC · JPL
726336	2009 WS_{61}	—	October 23, 2003	Apache Point	SDSS Collaboration	·	3.3 km	MPC · JPL
726337	2009 WB_{63}	—	November 16, 2009	Mount Lemmon	Mount Lemmon Survey	·	2.5 km	MPC · JPL
726338	2009 WA_{67}	—	November 17, 2009	Mount Lemmon	Mount Lemmon Survey	VER	2.5 km	MPC · JPL
726339	2009 WF_{69}	—	November 17, 2009	Mount Lemmon	Mount Lemmon Survey	·	2.1 km	MPC · JPL
726340	2009 WV_{72}	—	November 18, 2009	Kitt Peak	Spacewatch	·	2.0 km	MPC · JPL
726341	2009 WO_{75}	—	November 18, 2009	Kitt Peak	Spacewatch	·	980 m	MPC · JPL
726342	2009 WR_{80}	—	December 5, 1996	Kitt Peak	Spacewatch	·	1.2 km	MPC · JPL
726343	2009 WS_{80}	—	November 18, 2009	Kitt Peak	Spacewatch	·	1.1 km	MPC · JPL
726344	2009 WB_{88}	—	November 19, 2009	Kitt Peak	Spacewatch	·	780 m	MPC · JPL
726345	2009 WX_{88}	—	October 5, 2005	Catalina	CSS	·	1.1 km	MPC · JPL
726346	2009 WC_{91}	—	November 19, 2009	Mount Lemmon	Mount Lemmon Survey	GEF	1.0 km	MPC · JPL
726347	2009 WF_{93}	—	October 25, 2009	Kitt Peak	Spacewatch	·	1.1 km	MPC · JPL
726348	2009 WL_{95}	—	October 23, 2009	Mount Lemmon	Mount Lemmon Survey	·	1.8 km	MPC · JPL
726349	2009 WN_{99}	—	October 24, 2009	Kitt Peak	Spacewatch	·	2.5 km	MPC · JPL
726350	2009 WY_{101}	—	November 18, 2009	Kitt Peak	Spacewatch	·	1.2 km	MPC · JPL
726351	2009 WM_{102}	—	November 22, 2009	Catalina	CSS	·	1.5 km	MPC · JPL
726352	2009 WD_{104}	—	November 23, 2009	Sierra Stars	R. Matson	·	4.0 km	MPC · JPL
726353	2009 WK_{107}	—	October 1, 2005	Kitt Peak	Spacewatch	MAS	620 m	MPC · JPL
726354	2009 WB_{112}	—	November 17, 2009	Mount Lemmon	Mount Lemmon Survey	·	2.3 km	MPC · JPL
726355	2009 WM_{112}	—	October 12, 2009	Mount Lemmon	Mount Lemmon Survey	·	1.1 km	MPC · JPL
726356	2009 WE_{116}	—	November 20, 2009	Kitt Peak	Spacewatch	·	890 m	MPC · JPL
726357	2009 WR_{117}	—	November 20, 2009	Kitt Peak	Spacewatch	·	1.3 km	MPC · JPL
726358	2009 WA_{125}	—	November 8, 2009	Kitt Peak	Spacewatch	·	2.2 km	MPC · JPL
726359	2009 WC_{126}	—	November 5, 2005	Kitt Peak	Spacewatch	MAS	560 m	MPC · JPL
726360	2009 WY_{126}	—	November 20, 2009	Kitt Peak	Spacewatch	·	2.0 km	MPC · JPL
726361	2009 WE_{127}	—	November 16, 2009	Kitt Peak	Spacewatch	·	1.7 km	MPC · JPL
726362	2009 WV_{127}	—	November 20, 2009	Kitt Peak	Spacewatch	·	960 m	MPC · JPL
726363	2009 WM_{137}	—	October 23, 2009	Mount Lemmon	Mount Lemmon Survey	NYS	760 m	MPC · JPL
726364	2009 WB_{139}	—	November 23, 2009	Mount Lemmon	Mount Lemmon Survey	PHO	770 m	MPC · JPL
726365	2009 WT_{141}	—	November 18, 2009	Mount Lemmon	Mount Lemmon Survey	·	2.1 km	MPC · JPL
726366	2009 WG_{146}	—	November 19, 2009	Mount Lemmon	Mount Lemmon Survey	·	1.0 km	MPC · JPL
726367	2009 WK_{152}	—	November 19, 2009	Mount Lemmon	Mount Lemmon Survey	TEL	1.2 km	MPC · JPL
726368	2009 WY_{153}	—	November 19, 2009	Mount Lemmon	Mount Lemmon Survey	·	1.5 km	MPC · JPL
726369	2009 WR_{154}	—	November 19, 2009	Mount Lemmon	Mount Lemmon Survey	L4	9.6 km	MPC · JPL
726370	2009 WB_{160}	—	December 1, 2005	Kitt Peak	Wasserman, L. H., Millis, R. L.	AEO	830 m	MPC · JPL
726371	2009 WG_{160}	—	November 21, 2009	Mount Lemmon	Mount Lemmon Survey	L4 · ERY	9.8 km	MPC · JPL
726372	2009 WL_{160}	—	November 21, 2009	Mount Lemmon	Mount Lemmon Survey	·	1.5 km	MPC · JPL
726373	2009 WW_{162}	—	November 21, 2009	Kitt Peak	Spacewatch	·	2.2 km	MPC · JPL
726374	2009 WY_{162}	—	November 21, 2009	Kitt Peak	Spacewatch	·	1.7 km	MPC · JPL
726375	2009 WM_{167}	—	November 22, 2009	Kitt Peak	Spacewatch	·	1.4 km	MPC · JPL
726376	2009 WJ_{168}	—	November 22, 2009	Kitt Peak	Spacewatch	·	1.6 km	MPC · JPL
726377	2009 WH_{170}	—	August 21, 2003	Campo Imperatore	CINEOS	·	1.9 km	MPC · JPL
726378	2009 WO_{173}	—	November 22, 2009	Mount Lemmon	Mount Lemmon Survey	·	1.5 km	MPC · JPL
726379	2009 WD_{178}	—	September 19, 2009	Mount Lemmon	Mount Lemmon Survey	WIT	940 m	MPC · JPL
726380	2009 WM_{181}	—	April 26, 2007	Kitt Peak	Spacewatch	·	2.4 km	MPC · JPL
726381	2009 WV_{185}	—	November 11, 2009	Kitt Peak	Spacewatch	·	1.1 km	MPC · JPL
726382	2009 WL_{188}	—	November 24, 2009	Mount Lemmon	Mount Lemmon Survey	·	3.6 km	MPC · JPL
726383	2009 WL_{193}	—	September 30, 2003	Kitt Peak	Spacewatch	·	3.1 km	MPC · JPL
726384	2009 WC_{201}	—	November 26, 2009	Mount Lemmon	Mount Lemmon Survey	·	2.6 km	MPC · JPL
726385	2009 WZ_{202}	—	September 21, 2009	Mount Lemmon	Mount Lemmon Survey	·	1.7 km	MPC · JPL
726386	2009 WH_{203}	—	February 4, 2005	Mount Lemmon	Mount Lemmon Survey	THM	2.0 km	MPC · JPL
726387	2009 WS_{206}	—	October 16, 2009	Mount Lemmon	Mount Lemmon Survey	·	2.0 km	MPC · JPL
726388	2009 WG_{208}	—	September 3, 2005	Palomar	NEAT	·	990 m	MPC · JPL
726389	2009 WX_{211}	—	November 18, 2009	Kitt Peak	Spacewatch	·	2.9 km	MPC · JPL
726390	2009 WN_{213}	—	November 19, 2009	Kitt Peak	Spacewatch	·	960 m	MPC · JPL
726391	2009 WS_{216}	—	November 22, 2009	Catalina	CSS	·	3.3 km	MPC · JPL
726392	2009 WQ_{222}	—	August 28, 2005	Kitt Peak	Spacewatch	·	770 m	MPC · JPL
726393	2009 WF_{228}	—	October 18, 2003	Apache Point	SDSS Collaboration	·	2.1 km	MPC · JPL
726394	2009 WD_{230}	—	November 17, 2009	Mount Lemmon	Mount Lemmon Survey	·	1.5 km	MPC · JPL
726395	2009 WA_{234}	—	September 19, 1998	Apache Point	SDSS Collaboration	·	2.8 km	MPC · JPL
726396	2009 WW_{238}	—	November 17, 2009	Mount Lemmon	Mount Lemmon Survey	·	1.3 km	MPC · JPL
726397	2009 WC_{239}	—	December 9, 2015	Haleakala	Pan-STARRS 1	EOS	1.4 km	MPC · JPL
726398	2009 WF_{240}	—	November 4, 2005	Kitt Peak	Spacewatch	NYS	930 m	MPC · JPL
726399	2009 WV_{241}	—	May 3, 2006	Mount Lemmon	Mount Lemmon Survey	·	3.8 km	MPC · JPL
726400	2009 WC_{242}	—	October 25, 2005	Mount Lemmon	Mount Lemmon Survey	·	830 m	MPC · JPL

== 726401–726500 ==
back to top

Designation			Discovery			Properties		Ref
Permanent	Provisional	Named after	Date	Site	Discoverer(s)	Category	Diam.	Ref
726401	2009 WR_{242}	—	November 19, 2009	Kitt Peak	Spacewatch	HOF	2.0 km	MPC · JPL
726402	2009 WL_{244}	—	November 19, 2009	Kitt Peak	Spacewatch	·	2.6 km	MPC · JPL
726403	2009 WP_{244}	—	November 19, 2009	Catalina	CSS	EUP	4.8 km	MPC · JPL
726404	2009 WD_{245}	—	November 21, 2009	Andrushivka	Andrushivka	·	3.7 km	MPC · JPL
726405	2009 WB_{246}	—	November 23, 2009	Kitt Peak	Spacewatch	KOR	1.2 km	MPC · JPL
726406	2009 WZ_{246}	—	November 26, 2009	Mount Lemmon	Mount Lemmon Survey	·	1.1 km	MPC · JPL
726407	2009 WT_{247}	—	November 27, 2009	Tzec Maun	Nevski, V.	·	2.5 km	MPC · JPL
726408	2009 WT_{252}	—	November 26, 2009	Mount Lemmon	Mount Lemmon Survey	3:2	4.1 km	MPC · JPL
726409	2009 WV_{252}	—	November 27, 2009	Mount Lemmon	Mount Lemmon Survey	·	840 m	MPC · JPL
726410	2009 WB_{255}	—	November 19, 2009	Kitt Peak	Spacewatch	EUP	5.1 km	MPC · JPL
726411	2009 WJ_{257}	—	November 25, 2009	Kitt Peak	Spacewatch	·	4.1 km	MPC · JPL
726412	2009 WK_{257}	—	November 25, 2009	Kitt Peak	Spacewatch	·	4.8 km	MPC · JPL
726413	2009 WM_{260}	—	November 25, 2009	Kitt Peak	Spacewatch	·	2.7 km	MPC · JPL
726414	2009 WU_{269}	—	October 23, 2009	Mount Lemmon	Mount Lemmon Survey	·	1.6 km	MPC · JPL
726415	2009 WX_{269}	—	March 9, 2005	Kitt Peak	Spacewatch	·	3.8 km	MPC · JPL
726416	2009 WJ_{270}	—	January 30, 2011	Mount Lemmon	Mount Lemmon Survey	·	2.0 km	MPC · JPL
726417	2009 WE_{271}	—	November 23, 2009	Catalina	CSS	BRG	1.5 km	MPC · JPL
726418	2009 WY_{271}	—	January 27, 2011	Mount Lemmon	Mount Lemmon Survey	3:2 · SHU	4.3 km	MPC · JPL
726419	2009 WE_{272}	—	November 21, 2009	Mount Lemmon	Mount Lemmon Survey	·	1.5 km	MPC · JPL
726420	2009 WA_{273}	—	December 25, 2013	Mount Lemmon	Mount Lemmon Survey	·	810 m	MPC · JPL
726421	2009 WD_{273}	—	March 28, 2012	Mount Lemmon	Mount Lemmon Survey	EOS	1.5 km	MPC · JPL
726422	2009 WN_{273}	—	April 18, 2012	Mount Lemmon	Mount Lemmon Survey	EOS	1.7 km	MPC · JPL
726423	2009 WB_{274}	—	February 25, 2011	Mount Lemmon	Mount Lemmon Survey	·	670 m	MPC · JPL
726424	2009 WH_{274}	—	July 13, 2013	Haleakala	Pan-STARRS 1	KOR	1.0 km	MPC · JPL
726425	2009 WN_{274}	—	October 24, 2009	Kitt Peak	Spacewatch	HYG	2.4 km	MPC · JPL
726426	2009 WB_{276}	—	April 23, 2015	Haleakala	Pan-STARRS 1	·	750 m	MPC · JPL
726427	2009 WP_{276}	—	April 27, 2012	Haleakala	Pan-STARRS 1	·	1.1 km	MPC · JPL
726428	2009 WG_{277}	—	November 27, 2014	Haleakala	Pan-STARRS 1	·	2.6 km	MPC · JPL
726429	2009 WJ_{279}	—	November 27, 2009	Mount Lemmon	Mount Lemmon Survey	·	1.9 km	MPC · JPL
726430	2009 WK_{279}	—	October 29, 2014	Kitt Peak	Spacewatch	·	1.9 km	MPC · JPL
726431	2009 WN_{279}	—	October 1, 2014	Haleakala	Pan-STARRS 1	T_{j} (2.98)	2.8 km	MPC · JPL
726432	2009 WY_{279}	—	February 21, 2017	Haleakala	Pan-STARRS 1	EOS	1.4 km	MPC · JPL
726433	2009 WA_{280}	—	March 7, 2016	Haleakala	Pan-STARRS 1	·	1.6 km	MPC · JPL
726434	2009 WL_{280}	—	August 27, 2016	Haleakala	Pan-STARRS 1	3:2	4.5 km	MPC · JPL
726435	2009 WM_{282}	—	November 17, 2009	Mount Lemmon	Mount Lemmon Survey	EOS	1.9 km	MPC · JPL
726436	2009 WX_{283}	—	August 2, 2016	Haleakala	Pan-STARRS 1	V	510 m	MPC · JPL
726437	2009 WC_{284}	—	May 29, 2015	Haleakala	Pan-STARRS 1	·	1.2 km	MPC · JPL
726438	2009 WK_{284}	—	June 8, 2018	Haleakala	Pan-STARRS 1	·	2.2 km	MPC · JPL
726439	2009 WM_{285}	—	November 26, 2009	Kitt Peak	Spacewatch	·	580 m	MPC · JPL
726440	2009 WN_{285}	—	August 14, 2012	Kitt Peak	Spacewatch	·	700 m	MPC · JPL
726441	2009 WJ_{287}	—	November 20, 2009	Kitt Peak	Spacewatch	·	1.4 km	MPC · JPL
726442	2009 WJ_{289}	—	November 21, 2009	Kitt Peak	Spacewatch	3:2 · SHU	4.6 km	MPC · JPL
726443	2009 WV_{291}	—	November 17, 2009	Mount Lemmon	Mount Lemmon Survey	·	1.6 km	MPC · JPL
726444	2009 WV_{299}	—	November 22, 2009	Kitt Peak	Spacewatch	·	1.1 km	MPC · JPL
726445	2009 XM_{2}	—	December 11, 2009	Tzec Maun	D. Chestnov, A. Novichonok	·	4.3 km	MPC · JPL
726446	2009 XY_{2}	—	December 11, 2009	Tzec Maun	Shurpakov, S.	·	6.0 km	MPC · JPL
726447	2009 XV_{5}	—	October 15, 2001	Apache Point	SDSS	·	970 m	MPC · JPL
726448	2009 XP_{8}	—	December 16, 2009	Mount Lemmon	Mount Lemmon Survey	·	1.5 km	MPC · JPL
726449	2009 XF_{10}	—	December 10, 2009	Mount Lemmon	Mount Lemmon Survey	·	2.5 km	MPC · JPL
726450	2009 XK_{10}	—	November 20, 2009	Kitt Peak	Spacewatch	·	1.8 km	MPC · JPL
726451	2009 XW_{16}	—	December 15, 2009	Mount Lemmon	Mount Lemmon Survey	URS	3.9 km	MPC · JPL
726452	2009 XK_{26}	—	December 10, 2009	Mount Lemmon	Mount Lemmon Survey	·	1.9 km	MPC · JPL
726453	2009 XK_{28}	—	October 26, 2016	Haleakala	Pan-STARRS 1	·	870 m	MPC · JPL
726454	2009 XW_{28}	—	December 10, 2009	Mount Lemmon	Mount Lemmon Survey	·	1.1 km	MPC · JPL
726455	2009 XH_{29}	—	December 10, 2009	Mount Lemmon	Mount Lemmon Survey	·	1.7 km	MPC · JPL
726456	2009 YD_{3}	—	December 17, 2009	Mount Lemmon	Mount Lemmon Survey	·	1.4 km	MPC · JPL
726457	2009 YG_{4}	—	December 17, 2009	Mount Lemmon	Mount Lemmon Survey	·	2.7 km	MPC · JPL
726458	2009 YK_{6}	—	December 19, 2009	Kitt Peak	Spacewatch	·	5.6 km	MPC · JPL
726459	2009 YY_{6}	—	December 30, 2000	Haleakala	NEAT	·	3.6 km	MPC · JPL
726460	2009 YS_{7}	—	December 16, 2009	Kitt Peak	Spacewatch	·	3.2 km	MPC · JPL
726461	2009 YY_{9}	—	December 17, 2009	Mount Lemmon	Mount Lemmon Survey	·	4.2 km	MPC · JPL
726462	2009 YK_{11}	—	December 18, 2009	Mount Lemmon	Mount Lemmon Survey	H	420 m	MPC · JPL
726463	2009 YV_{13}	—	May 22, 2006	Kitt Peak	Spacewatch	·	2.0 km	MPC · JPL
726464	2009 YH_{15}	—	December 18, 2009	Kitt Peak	Spacewatch	·	2.3 km	MPC · JPL
726465	2009 YJ_{21}	—	December 18, 2009	Mount Lemmon	Mount Lemmon Survey	·	2.4 km	MPC · JPL
726466	2009 YG_{22}	—	December 18, 2009	Kitt Peak	Spacewatch	·	5.6 km	MPC · JPL
726467	2009 YL_{23}	—	December 18, 2009	Kitt Peak	Spacewatch	·	3.6 km	MPC · JPL
726468	2009 YC_{27}	—	December 18, 2009	Mount Lemmon	Mount Lemmon Survey	·	1.7 km	MPC · JPL
726469	2009 YL_{27}	—	December 17, 2009	Kitt Peak	Spacewatch	EOS	1.8 km	MPC · JPL
726470	2009 YX_{27}	—	July 28, 2016	Haleakala	Pan-STARRS 1	·	1.1 km	MPC · JPL
726471	2009 YF_{28}	—	December 19, 2009	Kitt Peak	Spacewatch	PHO	800 m	MPC · JPL
726472	2009 YQ_{28}	—	January 9, 2005	Campo Imperatore	CINEOS	·	1.7 km	MPC · JPL
726473	2009 YA_{29}	—	December 18, 2009	Mount Lemmon	Mount Lemmon Survey	·	1.3 km	MPC · JPL
726474	2009 YN_{30}	—	November 26, 2009	Kitt Peak	Spacewatch	VER	2.5 km	MPC · JPL
726475	2009 YF_{31}	—	December 26, 2009	Kitt Peak	Spacewatch	·	630 m	MPC · JPL
726476	2009 YH_{31}	—	July 14, 2013	Haleakala	Pan-STARRS 1	VER	2.3 km	MPC · JPL
726477	2009 YU_{31}	—	December 17, 2009	Mount Lemmon	Mount Lemmon Survey	·	940 m	MPC · JPL
726478	2009 YW_{31}	—	December 25, 2009	Kitt Peak	Spacewatch	·	2.1 km	MPC · JPL
726479	2009 YX_{31}	—	December 26, 2009	Kitt Peak	Spacewatch	·	1.7 km	MPC · JPL
726480	2009 YP_{32}	—	October 4, 2003	Kitt Peak	Spacewatch	TRE	2.7 km	MPC · JPL
726481	2009 YO_{33}	—	December 18, 2009	Mount Lemmon	Mount Lemmon Survey	·	1.8 km	MPC · JPL
726482	2009 YT_{33}	—	October 13, 2004	Kitt Peak	Spacewatch	·	1.5 km	MPC · JPL
726483	2010 AU_{21}	—	January 6, 2010	Kitt Peak	Spacewatch	·	870 m	MPC · JPL
726484	2010 AX_{29}	—	December 18, 2009	Mount Lemmon	Mount Lemmon Survey	·	2.6 km	MPC · JPL
726485	2010 AD_{30}	—	October 1, 2009	Mount Lemmon	Mount Lemmon Survey	L4	12 km	MPC · JPL
726486	2010 AK_{30}	—	January 9, 2010	Nazaret	Muler, G.	·	3.1 km	MPC · JPL
726487	2010 AG_{32}	—	January 6, 2010	Kitt Peak	Spacewatch	·	1.1 km	MPC · JPL
726488	2010 AG_{35}	—	January 7, 2010	Kitt Peak	Spacewatch	·	1.4 km	MPC · JPL
726489	2010 AJ_{42}	—	January 6, 2010	Mount Lemmon	Mount Lemmon Survey	·	2.2 km	MPC · JPL
726490	2010 AC_{47}	—	November 17, 2009	Mount Lemmon	Mount Lemmon Survey	·	3.2 km	MPC · JPL
726491	2010 AO_{51}	—	January 8, 2010	Mount Lemmon	Mount Lemmon Survey	·	670 m	MPC · JPL
726492	2010 AY_{52}	—	January 8, 2010	Mount Lemmon	Mount Lemmon Survey	·	1.0 km	MPC · JPL
726493	2010 AL_{53}	—	January 8, 2010	Kitt Peak	Spacewatch	·	3.3 km	MPC · JPL
726494	2010 AF_{57}	—	October 23, 2003	Apache Point	SDSS Collaboration	EOS	1.7 km	MPC · JPL
726495	2010 AX_{59}	—	January 27, 2006	Catalina	CSS	·	1.3 km	MPC · JPL
726496	2010 AE_{60}	—	January 10, 2010	Hawkeye	Roland, C.	·	3.1 km	MPC · JPL
726497	2010 AF_{63}	—	December 19, 2009	Kitt Peak	Spacewatch	·	3.8 km	MPC · JPL
726498	2010 AH_{68}	—	November 27, 2009	Mount Lemmon	Mount Lemmon Survey	THB	2.6 km	MPC · JPL
726499	2010 AP_{68}	—	February 9, 2002	Kitt Peak	Spacewatch	KON	2.0 km	MPC · JPL
726500	2010 AB_{82}	—	January 7, 2010	WISE	WISE	·	3.4 km	MPC · JPL

== 726501–726600 ==
back to top

Designation			Discovery			Properties		Ref
Permanent	Provisional	Named after	Date	Site	Discoverer(s)	Category	Diam.	Ref
726501	2010 AO_{82}	—	January 7, 2010	WISE	WISE	·	3.7 km	MPC · JPL
726502	2010 AQ_{82}	—	January 15, 2003	Campo Imperatore	CINEOS	·	1.4 km	MPC · JPL
726503	2010 AN_{83}	—	January 7, 2010	WISE	WISE	·	5.1 km	MPC · JPL
726504	2010 AV_{83}	—	January 7, 2010	WISE	WISE	·	2.6 km	MPC · JPL
726505	2010 AB_{84}	—	January 7, 2010	WISE	WISE	·	3.6 km	MPC · JPL
726506	2010 AD_{84}	—	October 18, 2003	Apache Point	SDSS Collaboration	·	3.3 km	MPC · JPL
726507	2010 AY_{86}	—	January 8, 2010	WISE	WISE	·	3.0 km	MPC · JPL
726508	2010 AZ_{86}	—	December 6, 2002	Socorro	LINEAR	T_{j} (2.98) · EUP	5.4 km	MPC · JPL
726509	2010 AF_{87}	—	March 6, 2016	Haleakala	Pan-STARRS 1	URS	2.6 km	MPC · JPL
726510	2010 AV_{87}	—	January 8, 2010	WISE	WISE	·	2.1 km	MPC · JPL
726511	2010 AO_{88}	—	August 28, 2014	Haleakala	Pan-STARRS 1	EOS	3.2 km	MPC · JPL
726512	2010 AQ_{89}	—	October 14, 2009	Kitt Peak	Spacewatch	EOS	1.5 km	MPC · JPL
726513	2010 AS_{89}	—	January 8, 2010	WISE	WISE	ERI	1.0 km	MPC · JPL
726514	2010 AD_{91}	—	January 8, 2010	WISE	WISE	·	4.7 km	MPC · JPL
726515	2010 AH_{91}	—	October 15, 2009	Mount Lemmon	Mount Lemmon Survey	·	4.3 km	MPC · JPL
726516	2010 AJ_{91}	—	August 21, 2004	Kitt Peak	Spacewatch	·	1.9 km	MPC · JPL
726517	2010 AM_{91}	—	September 19, 2009	Kitt Peak	Spacewatch	·	1.7 km	MPC · JPL
726518	2010 AN_{91}	—	September 25, 2009	Catalina	CSS	·	2.8 km	MPC · JPL
726519	2010 AV_{91}	—	January 8, 2010	WISE	WISE	·	960 m	MPC · JPL
726520	2010 AJ_{94}	—	January 8, 2010	WISE	WISE	·	1.9 km	MPC · JPL
726521	2010 AX_{94}	—	October 15, 2009	Catalina	CSS	DOR	2.4 km	MPC · JPL
726522	2010 AE_{97}	—	October 17, 2009	Mount Lemmon	Mount Lemmon Survey	·	820 m	MPC · JPL
726523	2010 AL_{97}	—	January 9, 2010	WISE	WISE	·	2.9 km	MPC · JPL
726524	2010 AV_{97}	—	December 30, 2005	Kitt Peak	Spacewatch	·	2.0 km	MPC · JPL
726525	2010 AA_{98}	—	January 10, 2010	WISE	WISE	·	3.7 km	MPC · JPL
726526	2010 AE_{98}	—	January 10, 2010	WISE	WISE	·	2.2 km	MPC · JPL
726527	2010 AN_{99}	—	June 24, 2014	Haleakala	Pan-STARRS 1	·	4.1 km	MPC · JPL
726528	2010 AF_{100}	—	January 12, 2010	WISE	WISE	·	2.7 km	MPC · JPL
726529	2010 AJ_{100}	—	January 12, 2010	WISE	WISE	·	3.6 km	MPC · JPL
726530	2010 AV_{100}	—	May 16, 2007	Catalina	CSS	·	4.0 km	MPC · JPL
726531	2010 AW_{100}	—	January 7, 2006	Mount Lemmon	Mount Lemmon Survey	·	4.0 km	MPC · JPL
726532	2010 AD_{101}	—	September 28, 2009	Mount Lemmon	Mount Lemmon Survey	THB	2.7 km	MPC · JPL
726533	2010 AG_{101}	—	October 15, 2009	Catalina	CSS	·	1.5 km	MPC · JPL
726534	2010 AU_{101}	—	October 24, 2009	Mount Lemmon	Mount Lemmon Survey	·	1.1 km	MPC · JPL
726535	2010 AW_{101}	—	January 12, 2010	WISE	WISE	·	2.4 km	MPC · JPL
726536	2010 AM_{102}	—	October 16, 2009	Catalina	CSS	·	3.4 km	MPC · JPL
726537	2010 AR_{102}	—	September 30, 2009	Mount Lemmon	Mount Lemmon Survey	L4	11 km	MPC · JPL
726538	2010 AQ_{103}	—	March 13, 2010	Kitt Peak	Spacewatch	·	2.7 km	MPC · JPL
726539	2010 AH_{104}	—	January 12, 2010	WISE	WISE	·	4.6 km	MPC · JPL
726540	2010 AL_{104}	—	November 24, 2008	Mount Lemmon	Mount Lemmon Survey	·	3.7 km	MPC · JPL
726541	2010 AJ_{105}	—	November 20, 2004	Kitt Peak	Spacewatch	·	3.4 km	MPC · JPL
726542	2010 AZ_{105}	—	January 12, 2010	WISE	WISE	·	3.8 km	MPC · JPL
726543	2010 AD_{108}	—	January 12, 2010	WISE	WISE	·	4.0 km	MPC · JPL
726544	2010 AM_{108}	—	October 25, 2009	Kitt Peak	Spacewatch	·	1.3 km	MPC · JPL
726545	2010 AZ_{108}	—	January 12, 2010	WISE	WISE	EUP	2.9 km	MPC · JPL
726546	2010 AC_{109}	—	January 12, 2010	WISE	WISE	·	2.7 km	MPC · JPL
726547	2010 AB_{111}	—	January 13, 2010	WISE	WISE	·	3.0 km	MPC · JPL
726548	2010 AT_{112}	—	January 13, 2010	WISE	WISE	·	2.6 km	MPC · JPL
726549	2010 AL_{113}	—	October 8, 2015	Haleakala	Pan-STARRS 1	·	2.1 km	MPC · JPL
726550	2010 AS_{113}	—	January 13, 2010	WISE	WISE	·	3.5 km	MPC · JPL
726551	2010 AW_{114}	—	September 30, 2009	Mount Lemmon	Mount Lemmon Survey	·	2.7 km	MPC · JPL
726552	2010 AD_{115}	—	April 15, 2010	Mount Lemmon	Mount Lemmon Survey	·	1.9 km	MPC · JPL
726553	2010 AH_{115}	—	November 2, 2007	Kitt Peak	Spacewatch	·	3.1 km	MPC · JPL
726554	2010 AM_{115}	—	August 15, 2006	Lulin	LUSS	·	4.9 km	MPC · JPL
726555	2010 AZ_{115}	—	January 13, 2010	WISE	WISE	·	2.5 km	MPC · JPL
726556	2010 AD_{116}	—	January 13, 2010	WISE	WISE	·	2.1 km	MPC · JPL
726557	2010 AK_{116}	—	September 30, 2009	Mount Lemmon	Mount Lemmon Survey	ADE	2.7 km	MPC · JPL
726558	2010 AM_{116}	—	October 16, 2009	Catalina	CSS	L4	9.2 km	MPC · JPL
726559	2010 AE_{117}	—	December 2, 2008	Mount Lemmon	Mount Lemmon Survey	·	4.4 km	MPC · JPL
726560	2010 AT_{117}	—	September 20, 2003	Palomar	NEAT	·	3.1 km	MPC · JPL
726561	2010 AW_{117}	—	January 13, 2010	WISE	WISE	·	4.4 km	MPC · JPL
726562	2010 AQ_{121}	—	January 14, 2010	WISE	WISE	EOS	2.3 km	MPC · JPL
726563	2010 AL_{122}	—	April 15, 2010	Mount Lemmon	Mount Lemmon Survey	·	2.0 km	MPC · JPL
726564	2010 AE_{123}	—	January 14, 2010	WISE	WISE	L4	8.9 km	MPC · JPL
726565	2010 AX_{123}	—	September 15, 2009	Kitt Peak	Spacewatch	KON	2.1 km	MPC · JPL
726566	2010 AZ_{123}	—	January 6, 2010	Mount Lemmon	Mount Lemmon Survey	·	2.8 km	MPC · JPL
726567	2010 AH_{126}	—	January 14, 2010	WISE	WISE	·	4.1 km	MPC · JPL
726568	2010 AQ_{126}	—	January 14, 2010	WISE	WISE	·	3.9 km	MPC · JPL
726569	2010 AT_{126}	—	November 24, 2002	Palomar	NEAT	·	4.7 km	MPC · JPL
726570	2010 AK_{127}	—	May 3, 2008	Mount Lemmon	Mount Lemmon Survey	PHO	2.6 km	MPC · JPL
726571	2010 AL_{127}	—	January 14, 2010	WISE	WISE	·	3.5 km	MPC · JPL
726572	2010 AU_{127}	—	January 14, 2010	WISE	WISE	·	2.4 km	MPC · JPL
726573	2010 AP_{128}	—	January 14, 2010	WISE	WISE	·	4.8 km	MPC · JPL
726574	2010 AT_{128}	—	June 4, 2005	Kitt Peak	Spacewatch	·	4.8 km	MPC · JPL
726575	2010 AH_{129}	—	April 18, 2015	Cerro Tololo-DECam	DECam	L4	7.9 km	MPC · JPL
726576	2010 AJ_{129}	—	September 6, 2008	Mount Lemmon	Mount Lemmon Survey	L4	7.8 km	MPC · JPL
726577	2010 AP_{129}	—	October 30, 2007	Mount Lemmon	Mount Lemmon Survey	URS	4.0 km	MPC · JPL
726578	2010 AX_{129}	—	December 14, 2004	Socorro	LINEAR	·	3.1 km	MPC · JPL
726579	2010 AZ_{133}	—	April 3, 2010	Kitt Peak	Spacewatch	·	2.1 km	MPC · JPL
726580	2010 AC_{134}	—	January 15, 2010	WISE	WISE	·	3.7 km	MPC · JPL
726581	2010 AE_{134}	—	January 15, 2010	WISE	WISE	·	2.8 km	MPC · JPL
726582	2010 AT_{135}	—	February 11, 2004	Kitt Peak	Spacewatch	EOS	3.0 km	MPC · JPL
726583	2010 AC_{136}	—	January 15, 2010	WISE	WISE	EOS	1.9 km	MPC · JPL
726584	2010 AW_{137}	—	September 27, 2009	Mount Lemmon	Mount Lemmon Survey	·	4.5 km	MPC · JPL
726585	2010 AA_{142}	—	December 26, 2005	Mount Lemmon	Mount Lemmon Survey	·	890 m	MPC · JPL
726586	2010 AU_{143}	—	March 16, 2005	Mount Lemmon	Mount Lemmon Survey	·	2.0 km	MPC · JPL
726587	2010 AY_{143}	—	November 21, 2009	Mount Lemmon	Mount Lemmon Survey	·	1.6 km	MPC · JPL
726588	2010 AA_{144}	—	October 26, 2008	Cerro Tololo	Wasserman, L. H.	HNS	1.0 km	MPC · JPL
726589	2010 AS_{148}	—	February 8, 2011	Mount Lemmon	Mount Lemmon Survey	·	1.7 km	MPC · JPL
726590	2010 AL_{150}	—	July 8, 2010	WISE	WISE	·	1 km	MPC · JPL
726591	2010 AE_{154}	—	December 20, 2009	Kitt Peak	Spacewatch	·	1.2 km	MPC · JPL
726592	2010 AN_{156}	—	January 11, 2010	Kitt Peak	Spacewatch	·	3.2 km	MPC · JPL
726593	2010 AS_{157}	—	March 2, 2016	Mount Lemmon	Mount Lemmon Survey	·	1.7 km	MPC · JPL
726594	2010 AU_{157}	—	June 3, 2011	Mount Lemmon	Mount Lemmon Survey	·	850 m	MPC · JPL
726595	2010 AB_{158}	—	March 20, 2017	Haleakala	Pan-STARRS 1	·	2.7 km	MPC · JPL
726596	2010 AO_{159}	—	January 11, 2010	Mount Lemmon	Mount Lemmon Survey	·	1.7 km	MPC · JPL
726597	2010 AJ_{160}	—	March 22, 2015	Haleakala	Pan-STARRS 1	·	980 m	MPC · JPL
726598	2010 AG_{162}	—	January 11, 2010	Mount Lemmon	Mount Lemmon Survey	THM	1.6 km	MPC · JPL
726599	2010 AO_{164}	—	January 7, 2010	Kitt Peak	Spacewatch	KON	1.7 km	MPC · JPL
726600	2010 BQ_{2}	—	January 17, 2010	Bisei	BATTeRS	(1298)	3.6 km	MPC · JPL

== 726601–726700 ==
back to top

Designation			Discovery			Properties		Ref
Permanent	Provisional	Named after	Date	Site	Discoverer(s)	Category	Diam.	Ref
726601	2010 BM_{5}	—	March 8, 2005	Mount Lemmon	Mount Lemmon Survey	·	2.3 km	MPC · JPL
726602	2010 BU_{5}	—	January 13, 2010	Mount Lemmon	Mount Lemmon Survey	·	690 m	MPC · JPL
726603	2010 BW_{8}	—	September 29, 2009	Mount Lemmon	Mount Lemmon Survey	·	3.0 km	MPC · JPL
726604	2010 BZ_{8}	—	January 16, 2010	WISE	WISE	EOS	2.2 km	MPC · JPL
726605	2010 BV_{9}	—	October 14, 2009	Kitt Peak	Spacewatch	·	1.8 km	MPC · JPL
726606	2010 BA_{11}	—	October 24, 2005	Mauna Kea	A. Boattini	·	2.6 km	MPC · JPL
726607	2010 BX_{11}	—	August 25, 2004	Kitt Peak	Spacewatch	3:2	3.5 km	MPC · JPL
726608	2010 BY_{11}	—	February 17, 2004	La Silla	Barbieri, C.	·	4.7 km	MPC · JPL
726609	2010 BA_{12}	—	June 21, 2006	Palomar	NEAT	·	4.1 km	MPC · JPL
726610	2010 BH_{12}	—	September 18, 2003	Palomar	NEAT	·	3.7 km	MPC · JPL
726611	2010 BQ_{12}	—	September 27, 2009	Mount Lemmon	Mount Lemmon Survey	·	3.2 km	MPC · JPL
726612	2010 BT_{13}	—	March 15, 2007	Mount Lemmon	Mount Lemmon Survey	·	2.4 km	MPC · JPL
726613	2010 BG_{14}	—	October 16, 2009	Catalina	CSS	·	2.6 km	MPC · JPL
726614	2010 BK_{14}	—	November 20, 2009	Catalina	CSS	L4	17 km	MPC · JPL
726615	2010 BB_{16}	—	September 25, 2008	Mount Lemmon	Mount Lemmon Survey	L4	8.4 km	MPC · JPL
726616	2010 BR_{16}	—	January 16, 2010	WISE	WISE	·	1.5 km	MPC · JPL
726617	2010 BT_{16}	—	January 16, 2010	WISE	WISE	DOR	1.9 km	MPC · JPL
726618	2010 BJ_{17}	—	January 17, 2010	WISE	WISE	·	2.6 km	MPC · JPL
726619	2010 BU_{17}	—	September 27, 2009	Mount Lemmon	Mount Lemmon Survey	·	2.8 km	MPC · JPL
726620	2010 BE_{19}	—	August 29, 2005	Kitt Peak	Spacewatch	·	2.5 km	MPC · JPL
726621	2010 BE_{20}	—	January 17, 2010	WISE	WISE	L4	10 km	MPC · JPL
726622	2010 BM_{21}	—	November 19, 2009	Mount Lemmon	Mount Lemmon Survey	·	5.1 km	MPC · JPL
726623	2010 BS_{21}	—	September 16, 2009	Mount Lemmon	Mount Lemmon Survey	L4	10 km	MPC · JPL
726624	2010 BU_{21}	—	May 23, 2006	Kitt Peak	Spacewatch	EUN	2.4 km	MPC · JPL
726625	2010 BA_{22}	—	March 3, 2005	Kitt Peak	Spacewatch	·	3.0 km	MPC · JPL
726626	2010 BV_{22}	—	September 29, 2009	Mount Lemmon	Mount Lemmon Survey	L4	9.9 km	MPC · JPL
726627	2010 BA_{23}	—	September 30, 2009	Mount Lemmon	Mount Lemmon Survey	·	2.4 km	MPC · JPL
726628	2010 BQ_{23}	—	April 9, 2010	Catalina	CSS	PHO	1.8 km	MPC · JPL
726629	2010 BA_{24}	—	November 20, 2008	Mount Lemmon	Mount Lemmon Survey	ADE	2.1 km	MPC · JPL
726630	2010 BH_{25}	—	April 14, 2010	Mount Lemmon	Mount Lemmon Survey	EMA	3.3 km	MPC · JPL
726631	2010 BM_{25}	—	January 17, 2010	WISE	WISE	·	2.1 km	MPC · JPL
726632	2010 BS_{25}	—	January 17, 2010	WISE	WISE	·	3.0 km	MPC · JPL
726633	2010 BL_{26}	—	January 18, 2010	WISE	WISE	·	2.4 km	MPC · JPL
726634	2010 BF_{27}	—	January 18, 2010	WISE	WISE	·	3.1 km	MPC · JPL
726635	2010 BM_{27}	—	September 27, 2009	Mount Lemmon	Mount Lemmon Survey	·	3.9 km	MPC · JPL
726636	2010 BP_{27}	—	November 9, 2009	Catalina	CSS	·	2.6 km	MPC · JPL
726637	2010 BX_{27}	—	October 26, 2009	Mount Lemmon	Mount Lemmon Survey	·	3.5 km	MPC · JPL
726638	2010 BB_{28}	—	January 18, 2010	WISE	WISE	·	4.5 km	MPC · JPL
726639	2010 BT_{28}	—	January 18, 2010	WISE	WISE	(895)	3.6 km	MPC · JPL
726640	2010 BX_{32}	—	January 18, 2010	WISE	WISE	ADE	2.2 km	MPC · JPL
726641	2010 BY_{32}	—	November 4, 1996	Kitt Peak	Spacewatch	·	4.0 km	MPC · JPL
726642	2010 BG_{33}	—	January 18, 2010	WISE	WISE	·	2.7 km	MPC · JPL
726643	2010 BR_{33}	—	November 21, 2009	Mount Lemmon	Mount Lemmon Survey	·	3.6 km	MPC · JPL
726644	2010 BJ_{34}	—	May 13, 2010	Mount Lemmon	Mount Lemmon Survey	·	3.2 km	MPC · JPL
726645	2010 BT_{34}	—	January 18, 2010	WISE	WISE	·	1.7 km	MPC · JPL
726646	2010 BW_{35}	—	March 4, 2005	Kitt Peak	Spacewatch	·	2.9 km	MPC · JPL
726647	2010 BO_{37}	—	January 18, 2010	WISE	WISE	·	3.0 km	MPC · JPL
726648	2010 BG_{39}	—	October 27, 2009	Mount Lemmon	Mount Lemmon Survey	T_{j} (2.98) · 3:2	5.9 km	MPC · JPL
726649	2010 BJ_{39}	—	October 26, 2009	Mount Lemmon	Mount Lemmon Survey	·	2.5 km	MPC · JPL
726650	2010 BM_{39}	—	January 31, 2004	Apache Point	SDSS Collaboration	·	4.4 km	MPC · JPL
726651	2010 BO_{39}	—	December 6, 2008	Kitt Peak	Spacewatch	·	2.7 km	MPC · JPL
726652	2010 BV_{39}	—	January 19, 2010	WISE	WISE	·	3.2 km	MPC · JPL
726653	2010 BB_{40}	—	November 24, 2003	Kitt Peak	Spacewatch	·	3.6 km	MPC · JPL
726654	2010 BG_{40}	—	October 16, 2009	Catalina	CSS	·	2.6 km	MPC · JPL
726655	2010 BS_{40}	—	January 13, 2011	Kitt Peak	Spacewatch	·	2.6 km	MPC · JPL
726656	2010 BN_{41}	—	December 19, 2001	Palomar	NEAT	·	2.7 km	MPC · JPL
726657	2010 BA_{42}	—	January 19, 2010	WISE	WISE	·	2.3 km	MPC · JPL
726658	2010 BK_{42}	—	January 19, 2010	WISE	WISE	·	2.5 km	MPC · JPL
726659	2010 BL_{42}	—	January 19, 2010	WISE	WISE	·	2.1 km	MPC · JPL
726660	2010 BA_{43}	—	October 15, 2009	Catalina	CSS	·	2.2 km	MPC · JPL
726661	2010 BF_{43}	—	October 13, 2009	La Sagra	OAM	·	1.7 km	MPC · JPL
726662	2010 BN_{43}	—	January 19, 2010	WISE	WISE	·	3.2 km	MPC · JPL
726663	2010 BH_{44}	—	January 19, 2010	WISE	WISE	·	2.9 km	MPC · JPL
726664	2010 BY_{44}	—	January 19, 2010	WISE	WISE	·	2.5 km	MPC · JPL
726665	2010 BY_{45}	—	April 25, 2007	Kitt Peak	Spacewatch	·	3.5 km	MPC · JPL
726666	2010 BA_{46}	—	January 19, 2010	WISE	WISE	·	2.0 km	MPC · JPL
726667	2010 BA_{48}	—	January 20, 2010	WISE	WISE	·	3.3 km	MPC · JPL
726668	2010 BL_{49}	—	March 13, 2010	Kitt Peak	Spacewatch	·	1.2 km	MPC · JPL
726669	2010 BW_{49}	—	December 19, 2004	Kitt Peak	Spacewatch	·	2.8 km	MPC · JPL
726670	2010 BM_{51}	—	December 1, 2008	Kitt Peak	Spacewatch	·	2.7 km	MPC · JPL
726671	2010 BA_{52}	—	January 20, 2010	WISE	WISE	·	2.5 km	MPC · JPL
726672	2010 BU_{52}	—	September 16, 2009	Mount Lemmon	Mount Lemmon Survey	·	2.6 km	MPC · JPL
726673	2010 BZ_{52}	—	January 20, 2010	WISE	WISE	NAE	3.5 km	MPC · JPL
726674	2010 BV_{53}	—	January 20, 2010	WISE	WISE	·	2.7 km	MPC · JPL
726675	2010 BF_{54}	—	January 20, 2010	WISE	WISE	EUP	4.1 km	MPC · JPL
726676	2010 BB_{55}	—	December 17, 2001	Socorro	LINEAR	KON	1.9 km	MPC · JPL
726677	2010 BP_{55}	—	December 29, 2008	Mount Lemmon	Mount Lemmon Survey	·	3.1 km	MPC · JPL
726678	2010 BC_{56}	—	January 20, 2010	WISE	WISE	TIR	4.0 km	MPC · JPL
726679	2010 BM_{56}	—	October 24, 2009	Kitt Peak	Spacewatch	·	4.4 km	MPC · JPL
726680	2010 BV_{56}	—	September 17, 2003	Kitt Peak	Spacewatch	·	2.6 km	MPC · JPL
726681	2010 BY_{56}	—	January 21, 2010	WISE	WISE	·	2.4 km	MPC · JPL
726682	2010 BZ_{56}	—	January 21, 2010	WISE	WISE	·	3.2 km	MPC · JPL
726683	2010 BB_{57}	—	January 16, 2005	Mauna Kea	Veillet, C.	·	2.6 km	MPC · JPL
726684	2010 BP_{57}	—	November 12, 2007	Catalina	CSS	·	3.3 km	MPC · JPL
726685	2010 BY_{57}	—	January 21, 2010	WISE	WISE	·	4.3 km	MPC · JPL
726686	2010 BP_{58}	—	January 21, 2010	WISE	WISE	ULA	4.8 km	MPC · JPL
726687	2010 BL_{59}	—	October 2, 2009	Mount Lemmon	Mount Lemmon Survey	·	2.1 km	MPC · JPL
726688	2010 BB_{60}	—	October 17, 2007	Catalina	CSS	·	3.2 km	MPC · JPL
726689	2010 BO_{61}	—	October 19, 2003	Kitt Peak	Spacewatch	·	4.0 km	MPC · JPL
726690	2010 BU_{61}	—	January 21, 2010	WISE	WISE	·	2.3 km	MPC · JPL
726691	2010 BM_{62}	—	September 15, 2009	Mount Lemmon	Mount Lemmon Survey	L4	11 km	MPC · JPL
726692	2010 BV_{62}	—	June 21, 2007	Kitt Peak	Spacewatch	L4	10 km	MPC · JPL
726693	2010 BA_{64}	—	January 21, 2010	WISE	WISE	URS	5.4 km	MPC · JPL
726694	2010 BS_{64}	—	September 29, 2003	Kitt Peak	Spacewatch	·	2.4 km	MPC · JPL
726695	2010 BU_{64}	—	May 13, 2010	Mount Lemmon	Mount Lemmon Survey	·	3.6 km	MPC · JPL
726696	2010 BF_{65}	—	January 21, 2010	WISE	WISE	·	2.3 km	MPC · JPL
726697	2010 BO_{65}	—	January 2, 2009	Mount Lemmon	Mount Lemmon Survey	·	1.9 km	MPC · JPL
726698	2010 BL_{67}	—	March 18, 2010	Kitt Peak	Spacewatch	·	2.8 km	MPC · JPL
726699	2010 BE_{68}	—	January 22, 2010	WISE	WISE	·	3.6 km	MPC · JPL
726700	2010 BG_{68}	—	January 22, 2010	WISE	WISE	·	2.4 km	MPC · JPL

== 726701–726800 ==
back to top

Designation			Discovery			Properties		Ref
Permanent	Provisional	Named after	Date	Site	Discoverer(s)	Category	Diam.	Ref
726701	2010 BS_{69}	—	December 30, 2008	Mount Lemmon	Mount Lemmon Survey	·	2.4 km	MPC · JPL
726702	2010 BU_{69}	—	January 22, 2010	WISE	WISE	·	880 m	MPC · JPL
726703	2010 BA_{71}	—	January 22, 2010	WISE	WISE	·	5.5 km	MPC · JPL
726704	2010 BH_{71}	—	January 22, 2010	WISE	WISE	·	2.9 km	MPC · JPL
726705	2010 BN_{72}	—	January 23, 2010	WISE	WISE	·	3.0 km	MPC · JPL
726706	2010 BP_{72}	—	November 7, 2007	Catalina	CSS	·	5.7 km	MPC · JPL
726707	2010 BZ_{72}	—	January 23, 2010	WISE	WISE	·	2.2 km	MPC · JPL
726708	2010 BB_{74}	—	April 9, 2014	Haleakala	Pan-STARRS 1	·	1.3 km	MPC · JPL
726709	2010 BT_{75}	—	August 20, 2000	Kitt Peak	Spacewatch	·	3.7 km	MPC · JPL
726710	2010 BR_{76}	—	January 24, 2010	WISE	WISE	URS	2.8 km	MPC · JPL
726711	2010 BD_{77}	—	April 7, 2010	Bergisch Gladbach	W. Bickel	·	3.0 km	MPC · JPL
726712	2010 BG_{77}	—	October 18, 2007	Kitt Peak	Spacewatch	EOS	1.7 km	MPC · JPL
726713	2010 BM_{77}	—	January 24, 2010	WISE	WISE	·	4.5 km	MPC · JPL
726714	2010 BR_{77}	—	January 24, 2010	WISE	WISE	EOS	3.5 km	MPC · JPL
726715	2010 BC_{78}	—	January 24, 2010	WISE	WISE	·	4.6 km	MPC · JPL
726716	2010 BV_{78}	—	January 25, 2010	WISE	WISE	·	2.6 km	MPC · JPL
726717	2010 BE_{79}	—	January 25, 2010	WISE	WISE	L4	8.8 km	MPC · JPL
726718	2010 BJ_{79}	—	January 18, 2005	Kitt Peak	Spacewatch	·	3.1 km	MPC · JPL
726719	2010 BQ_{79}	—	April 14, 2010	Kitt Peak	Spacewatch	·	3.1 km	MPC · JPL
726720	2010 BT_{79}	—	January 23, 2006	Kitt Peak	Spacewatch	(13314)	2.1 km	MPC · JPL
726721	2010 BA_{80}	—	July 10, 2014	Haleakala	Pan-STARRS 1	·	2.6 km	MPC · JPL
726722	2010 BU_{80}	—	January 25, 2010	WISE	WISE	LIX	3.6 km	MPC · JPL
726723	2010 BG_{81}	—	January 25, 2010	WISE	WISE	·	2.3 km	MPC · JPL
726724	2010 BQ_{81}	—	January 25, 2010	WISE	WISE	·	3.6 km	MPC · JPL
726725	2010 BR_{81}	—	November 8, 2009	Catalina	CSS	·	2.7 km	MPC · JPL
726726	2010 BD_{82}	—	April 22, 2010	Bergisch Gladbach	W. Bickel	·	2.8 km	MPC · JPL
726727	2010 BH_{82}	—	February 14, 2004	Kitt Peak	Spacewatch	·	3.2 km	MPC · JPL
726728	2010 BC_{83}	—	July 1, 2014	Mount Lemmon	Mount Lemmon Survey	·	2.6 km	MPC · JPL
726729	2010 BD_{83}	—	November 20, 2008	Kitt Peak	Spacewatch	·	2.2 km	MPC · JPL
726730	2010 BW_{84}	—	January 26, 2010	WISE	WISE	LUT	4.1 km	MPC · JPL
726731	2010 BW_{85}	—	October 11, 1999	Kitt Peak	Spacewatch	KON	2.4 km	MPC · JPL
726732	2010 BP_{86}	—	January 26, 2010	WISE	WISE	·	5.1 km	MPC · JPL
726733	2010 BB_{87}	—	January 26, 2010	WISE	WISE	·	3.6 km	MPC · JPL
726734	2010 BH_{87}	—	January 26, 2010	WISE	WISE	·	4.5 km	MPC · JPL
726735	2010 BK_{87}	—	February 20, 2004	Haleakala	NEAT	EUP	3.5 km	MPC · JPL
726736	2010 BL_{87}	—	May 13, 2005	Kitt Peak	Spacewatch	·	3.6 km	MPC · JPL
726737	2010 BW_{87}	—	July 29, 2010	WISE	WISE	·	3.2 km	MPC · JPL
726738	2010 BY_{87}	—	January 1, 2009	Vail-Jarnac	Jarnac	·	5.5 km	MPC · JPL
726739	2010 BH_{88}	—	September 20, 2003	Kitt Peak	Spacewatch	·	3.5 km	MPC · JPL
726740	2010 BB_{89}	—	January 26, 2010	WISE	WISE	·	4.5 km	MPC · JPL
726741	2010 BF_{90}	—	December 5, 2008	Mount Lemmon	Mount Lemmon Survey	·	4.2 km	MPC · JPL
726742	2010 BR_{90}	—	November 8, 2009	Mount Lemmon	Mount Lemmon Survey	·	4.2 km	MPC · JPL
726743	2010 BA_{91}	—	January 26, 2010	WISE	WISE	·	2.3 km	MPC · JPL
726744	2010 BB_{91}	—	December 14, 2010	Mount Lemmon	Mount Lemmon Survey	L4	8.0 km	MPC · JPL
726745	2010 BC_{91}	—	October 1, 2009	Mount Lemmon	Mount Lemmon Survey	·	1.1 km	MPC · JPL
726746	2010 BN_{93}	—	October 30, 2009	Mount Lemmon	Mount Lemmon Survey	·	2.9 km	MPC · JPL
726747	2010 BP_{93}	—	November 9, 2009	Mount Lemmon	Mount Lemmon Survey	·	2.4 km	MPC · JPL
726748	2010 BQ_{93}	—	January 27, 2010	WISE	WISE	·	2.4 km	MPC · JPL
726749	2010 BF_{94}	—	January 27, 2010	WISE	WISE	·	3.3 km	MPC · JPL
726750	2010 BE_{95}	—	May 6, 2010	Mount Lemmon	Mount Lemmon Survey	DOR	2.5 km	MPC · JPL
726751	2010 BR_{96}	—	November 8, 2009	Catalina	CSS	DOR	2.1 km	MPC · JPL
726752	2010 BX_{97}	—	September 20, 2001	Apache Point	SDSS Collaboration	·	6.2 km	MPC · JPL
726753	2010 BO_{98}	—	October 30, 2009	Mount Lemmon	Mount Lemmon Survey	·	1.7 km	MPC · JPL
726754	2010 BK_{99}	—	January 27, 2010	WISE	WISE	L4	8.1 km	MPC · JPL
726755	2010 BP_{99}	—	January 27, 2010	WISE	WISE	·	2.7 km	MPC · JPL
726756	2010 BP_{100}	—	April 17, 2001	Anderson Mesa	LONEOS	ARM	5.2 km	MPC · JPL
726757	2010 BT_{100}	—	November 8, 2009	Mount Lemmon	Mount Lemmon Survey	·	1.4 km	MPC · JPL
726758	2010 BO_{101}	—	January 27, 2010	WISE	WISE	EUN	2.0 km	MPC · JPL
726759	2010 BM_{102}	—	September 17, 2003	Kitt Peak	Spacewatch	·	2.3 km	MPC · JPL
726760	2010 BL_{103}	—	January 28, 2010	WISE	WISE	·	4.2 km	MPC · JPL
726761	2010 BP_{103}	—	July 31, 2000	Cerro Tololo	Deep Ecliptic Survey	·	3.8 km	MPC · JPL
726762	2010 BL_{104}	—	January 28, 2010	WISE	WISE	·	4.2 km	MPC · JPL
726763	2010 BO_{104}	—	January 28, 2010	WISE	WISE	·	3.3 km	MPC · JPL
726764	2010 BY_{107}	—	May 14, 2010	Dauban	C. Rinner, Kugel, F.	·	1.8 km	MPC · JPL
726765	2010 BL_{108}	—	August 20, 2001	Cerro Tololo	Deep Ecliptic Survey	·	5.1 km	MPC · JPL
726766	2010 BX_{108}	—	January 28, 2010	WISE	WISE	URS	3.3 km	MPC · JPL
726767	2010 BY_{108}	—	October 23, 2009	Kitt Peak	Spacewatch	·	2.2 km	MPC · JPL
726768	2010 BZ_{108}	—	January 28, 2010	WISE	WISE	·	3.5 km	MPC · JPL
726769	2010 BG_{109}	—	February 26, 2007	Mount Lemmon	Mount Lemmon Survey	·	2.1 km	MPC · JPL
726770	2010 BM_{110}	—	January 29, 2010	WISE	WISE	·	2.1 km	MPC · JPL
726771	2010 BC_{111}	—	January 29, 2010	WISE	WISE	·	2.4 km	MPC · JPL
726772	2010 BZ_{113}	—	January 29, 2010	WISE	WISE	·	2.8 km	MPC · JPL
726773	2010 BD_{114}	—	February 1, 2009	Mount Lemmon	Mount Lemmon Survey	·	3.6 km	MPC · JPL
726774	2010 BB_{116}	—	October 21, 2009	Mount Lemmon	Mount Lemmon Survey	·	3.2 km	MPC · JPL
726775	2010 BC_{118}	—	October 30, 2009	Mount Lemmon	Mount Lemmon Survey	·	2.7 km	MPC · JPL
726776	2010 BR_{118}	—	February 21, 2007	Mount Lemmon	Mount Lemmon Survey	·	2.7 km	MPC · JPL
726777	2010 BZ_{120}	—	October 13, 2016	Mount Lemmon	Mount Lemmon Survey	EUN	1.0 km	MPC · JPL
726778	2010 BD_{122}	—	April 15, 2010	Mount Lemmon	Mount Lemmon Survey	·	3.3 km	MPC · JPL
726779	2010 BO_{122}	—	November 21, 2009	Catalina	CSS	EUP	3.7 km	MPC · JPL
726780	2010 BE_{123}	—	October 16, 2001	Palomar	NEAT	·	4.6 km	MPC · JPL
726781	2010 BO_{123}	—	March 25, 2007	Mount Lemmon	Mount Lemmon Survey	LIX	6.6 km	MPC · JPL
726782	2010 BQ_{123}	—	October 14, 2009	Mount Lemmon	Mount Lemmon Survey	TEL	2.9 km	MPC · JPL
726783	2010 BF_{124}	—	January 31, 2010	WISE	WISE	·	2.4 km	MPC · JPL
726784	2010 BP_{124}	—	October 26, 2009	Mount Lemmon	Mount Lemmon Survey	·	3.5 km	MPC · JPL
726785	2010 BR_{124}	—	October 12, 2009	Mount Lemmon	Mount Lemmon Survey	·	3.2 km	MPC · JPL
726786	2010 BU_{124}	—	January 31, 2010	WISE	WISE	·	2.7 km	MPC · JPL
726787	2010 BB_{125}	—	December 21, 2008	Kitt Peak	Spacewatch	·	3.2 km	MPC · JPL
726788	2010 BT_{126}	—	January 31, 2010	WISE	WISE	·	2.8 km	MPC · JPL
726789	2010 BJ_{127}	—	October 26, 2009	Mount Lemmon	Mount Lemmon Survey	·	2.9 km	MPC · JPL
726790	2010 BM_{127}	—	January 31, 2010	WISE	WISE	L4	11 km	MPC · JPL
726791	2010 BT_{127}	—	January 31, 2010	WISE	WISE	LUT	5.0 km	MPC · JPL
726792	2010 BY_{127}	—	July 19, 2005	Palomar	NEAT	·	4.9 km	MPC · JPL
726793	2010 BS_{128}	—	January 31, 2010	WISE	WISE	·	2.3 km	MPC · JPL
726794	2010 BB_{129}	—	January 23, 2006	Kitt Peak	Spacewatch	DOR	2.5 km	MPC · JPL
726795	2010 BO_{129}	—	November 8, 2009	Catalina	CSS	·	1.5 km	MPC · JPL
726796	2010 BU_{129}	—	January 31, 2010	WISE	WISE	·	2.3 km	MPC · JPL
726797	2010 BD_{130}	—	January 31, 2010	WISE	WISE	·	2.2 km	MPC · JPL
726798	2010 BM_{134}	—	February 18, 2005	La Silla	A. Boattini	·	2.5 km	MPC · JPL
726799	2010 BJ_{136}	—	January 2, 2009	Mount Lemmon	Mount Lemmon Survey	·	2.1 km	MPC · JPL
726800	2010 BB_{137}	—	September 14, 2005	Kitt Peak	Spacewatch	·	1.0 km	MPC · JPL

== 726801–726900 ==
back to top

Designation			Discovery			Properties		Ref
Permanent	Provisional	Named after	Date	Site	Discoverer(s)	Category	Diam.	Ref
726801	2010 BD_{137}	—	February 5, 2011	Haleakala	Pan-STARRS 1	·	1.1 km	MPC · JPL
726802	2010 BE_{139}	—	April 15, 2010	Mount Lemmon	Mount Lemmon Survey	·	1.4 km	MPC · JPL
726803	2010 BL_{141}	—	July 11, 2010	WISE	WISE	·	2.5 km	MPC · JPL
726804	2010 BQ_{152}	—	July 22, 2010	WISE	WISE	·	3.3 km	MPC · JPL
726805	2010 BR_{152}	—	March 2, 2009	Mount Lemmon	Mount Lemmon Survey	3:2	5.3 km	MPC · JPL
726806	2010 CE	—	December 19, 2009	Mount Lemmon	Mount Lemmon Survey	·	3.7 km	MPC · JPL
726807	2010 CF	—	February 6, 2010	Pla D'Arguines	R. Ferrando, Ferrando, M.	·	2.0 km	MPC · JPL
726808	2010 CU	—	February 5, 2010	WISE	WISE	·	2.5 km	MPC · JPL
726809	2010 CX	—	February 5, 2010	WISE	WISE	·	3.4 km	MPC · JPL
726810	2010 CT_{4}	—	November 24, 2009	Kitt Peak	Spacewatch	·	4.2 km	MPC · JPL
726811	2010 CY_{5}	—	February 6, 2010	WISE	WISE	·	1.4 km	MPC · JPL
726812	2010 CN_{9}	—	September 4, 2008	Kitt Peak	Spacewatch	·	3.6 km	MPC · JPL
726813	2010 CP_{9}	—	February 8, 2010	WISE	WISE	T_{j} (2.97)	4.6 km	MPC · JPL
726814	2010 CN_{11}	—	November 21, 2009	Catalina	CSS	LIX	3.9 km	MPC · JPL
726815	2010 CR_{11}	—	February 9, 2010	WISE	WISE	URS	4.0 km	MPC · JPL
726816	2010 CF_{13}	—	February 9, 2010	WISE	WISE	PHO	1.7 km	MPC · JPL
726817	2010 CG_{13}	—	March 18, 2004	Kitt Peak	Spacewatch	·	3.2 km	MPC · JPL
726818	2010 CL_{13}	—	February 10, 2010	WISE	WISE	·	3.2 km	MPC · JPL
726819	2010 CD_{14}	—	February 10, 2010	WISE	WISE	·	1.7 km	MPC · JPL
726820	2010 CD_{16}	—	February 10, 2010	WISE	WISE	EMA	2.6 km	MPC · JPL
726821	2010 CR_{18}	—	February 13, 2010	Tzec Maun	L. Elenin	·	3.6 km	MPC · JPL
726822	2010 CL_{24}	—	September 3, 2008	Kitt Peak	Spacewatch	·	2.2 km	MPC · JPL
726823	2010 CM_{30}	—	January 5, 2010	Kitt Peak	Spacewatch	·	2.9 km	MPC · JPL
726824	2010 CE_{35}	—	February 10, 2010	Kitt Peak	Spacewatch	·	3.8 km	MPC · JPL
726825	2010 CR_{37}	—	October 3, 1999	Kitt Peak	Spacewatch	·	1.3 km	MPC · JPL
726826	2010 CK_{40}	—	April 8, 2006	Kitt Peak	Spacewatch	HOF	2.8 km	MPC · JPL
726827	2010 CF_{42}	—	February 6, 2010	Mount Lemmon	Mount Lemmon Survey	·	4.0 km	MPC · JPL
726828	2010 CW_{42}	—	December 10, 2009	Catalina	CSS	·	2.1 km	MPC · JPL
726829	2010 CS_{43}	—	February 9, 2010	Catalina	CSS	·	3.3 km	MPC · JPL
726830	2010 CL_{45}	—	February 11, 2010	WISE	WISE	·	2.6 km	MPC · JPL
726831	2010 CT_{45}	—	November 23, 2009	Mount Lemmon	Mount Lemmon Survey	·	3.9 km	MPC · JPL
726832	2010 CP_{46}	—	February 27, 2000	Kitt Peak	Spacewatch	·	2.6 km	MPC · JPL
726833	2010 CV_{46}	—	October 26, 2009	Kitt Peak	Spacewatch	·	2.5 km	MPC · JPL
726834	2010 CY_{46}	—	February 12, 2010	WISE	WISE	·	2.8 km	MPC · JPL
726835	2010 CQ_{47}	—	February 12, 2010	WISE	WISE	·	2.0 km	MPC · JPL
726836	2010 CB_{48}	—	April 1, 2003	Apache Point	SDSS Collaboration	·	2.1 km	MPC · JPL
726837	2010 CD_{48}	—	February 12, 2010	WISE	WISE	ELF	3.2 km	MPC · JPL
726838	2010 CH_{49}	—	January 6, 2010	Mount Lemmon	Mount Lemmon Survey	·	4.6 km	MPC · JPL
726839	2010 CP_{49}	—	August 31, 2003	Haleakala	NEAT	·	4.1 km	MPC · JPL
726840	2010 CV_{49}	—	February 13, 2010	WISE	WISE	PHO	2.3 km	MPC · JPL
726841	2010 CX_{50}	—	February 13, 2010	WISE	WISE	·	2.3 km	MPC · JPL
726842	2010 CM_{52}	—	December 5, 1996	Kitt Peak	Spacewatch	·	4.3 km	MPC · JPL
726843	2010 CH_{53}	—	January 6, 2010	Mount Lemmon	Mount Lemmon Survey	·	3.1 km	MPC · JPL
726844	2010 CE_{60}	—	September 23, 2008	Mount Lemmon	Mount Lemmon Survey	·	1.8 km	MPC · JPL
726845	2010 CE_{64}	—	March 16, 2007	Mount Lemmon	Mount Lemmon Survey	·	1.3 km	MPC · JPL
726846	2010 CY_{65}	—	October 26, 2009	Kitt Peak	Spacewatch	·	4.4 km	MPC · JPL
726847	2010 CA_{69}	—	February 10, 2010	Kitt Peak	Spacewatch	EUN	940 m	MPC · JPL
726848	2010 CT_{72}	—	January 5, 2010	Kitt Peak	Spacewatch	·	860 m	MPC · JPL
726849	2010 CS_{74}	—	February 13, 2010	Mount Lemmon	Mount Lemmon Survey	·	2.2 km	MPC · JPL
726850	2010 CK_{81}	—	September 5, 2008	Kitt Peak	Spacewatch	·	950 m	MPC · JPL
726851	2010 CW_{83}	—	February 13, 2010	Kanab	Sheridan, E.	·	3.6 km	MPC · JPL
726852	2010 CN_{91}	—	February 14, 2010	Mount Lemmon	Mount Lemmon Survey	·	1.7 km	MPC · JPL
726853	2010 CT_{91}	—	February 14, 2010	Kitt Peak	Spacewatch	·	1.6 km	MPC · JPL
726854	2010 CV_{92}	—	November 21, 2003	Kitt Peak	Spacewatch	·	2.4 km	MPC · JPL
726855	2010 CX_{96}	—	February 14, 2010	Mount Lemmon	Mount Lemmon Survey	·	780 m	MPC · JPL
726856	2010 CN_{97}	—	February 6, 2010	Mount Lemmon	Mount Lemmon Survey	·	520 m	MPC · JPL
726857	2010 CF_{100}	—	November 8, 2008	Mount Lemmon	Mount Lemmon Survey	THM	1.9 km	MPC · JPL
726858	2010 CO_{102}	—	February 14, 2010	Mount Lemmon	Mount Lemmon Survey	·	1.4 km	MPC · JPL
726859	2010 CL_{104}	—	February 14, 2010	Mount Lemmon	Mount Lemmon Survey	·	1.1 km	MPC · JPL
726860	2010 CV_{106}	—	January 12, 2010	Kitt Peak	Spacewatch	·	1.2 km	MPC · JPL
726861	2010 CZ_{112}	—	February 14, 2010	Mount Lemmon	Mount Lemmon Survey	·	610 m	MPC · JPL
726862	2010 CV_{114}	—	February 14, 2010	Mount Lemmon	Mount Lemmon Survey	·	970 m	MPC · JPL
726863	2010 CR_{119}	—	February 15, 2010	Mount Lemmon	Mount Lemmon Survey	·	1.6 km	MPC · JPL
726864	2010 CW_{119}	—	February 15, 2010	Mount Lemmon	Mount Lemmon Survey	·	3.9 km	MPC · JPL
726865	2010 CT_{123}	—	February 15, 2010	Mount Lemmon	Mount Lemmon Survey	VER	3.7 km	MPC · JPL
726866	2010 CM_{125}	—	October 10, 2002	Apache Point	SDSS Collaboration	THM	2.1 km	MPC · JPL
726867	2010 CZ_{127}	—	January 31, 2003	Socorro	LINEAR	·	1.6 km	MPC · JPL
726868	2010 CX_{130}	—	February 14, 2010	WISE	WISE	EOS	3.1 km	MPC · JPL
726869	2010 CB_{131}	—	December 25, 1998	Kitt Peak	Spacewatch	LUT	4.3 km	MPC · JPL
726870	2010 CH_{132}	—	February 15, 2010	WISE	WISE	·	2.4 km	MPC · JPL
726871	2010 CZ_{133}	—	February 15, 2010	WISE	WISE	·	3.4 km	MPC · JPL
726872	2010 CU_{134}	—	January 25, 2009	Kitt Peak	Spacewatch	3:2	3.9 km	MPC · JPL
726873	2010 CE_{135}	—	February 12, 2010	WISE	WISE	·	2.1 km	MPC · JPL
726874	2010 CQ_{135}	—	August 29, 2006	Kitt Peak	Spacewatch	·	1.8 km	MPC · JPL
726875	2010 CR_{135}	—	February 12, 2004	Kitt Peak	Spacewatch	·	2.6 km	MPC · JPL
726876	2010 CZ_{135}	—	November 13, 2007	Mount Lemmon	Mount Lemmon Survey	·	2.0 km	MPC · JPL
726877	2010 CN_{136}	—	February 15, 2010	WISE	WISE	·	2.3 km	MPC · JPL
726878	2010 CD_{137}	—	February 15, 2010	WISE	WISE	·	3.3 km	MPC · JPL
726879	2010 CT_{138}	—	January 10, 2006	Mount Lemmon	Mount Lemmon Survey	MAS	570 m	MPC · JPL
726880	2010 CG_{140}	—	September 9, 2008	Mount Lemmon	Mount Lemmon Survey	·	2.8 km	MPC · JPL
726881	2010 CG_{141}	—	February 10, 2010	Kitt Peak	Spacewatch	·	1.6 km	MPC · JPL
726882	2010 CB_{143}	—	November 21, 2009	Mount Lemmon	Mount Lemmon Survey	·	2.1 km	MPC · JPL
726883	2010 CE_{144}	—	February 9, 2010	Catalina	CSS	·	3.4 km	MPC · JPL
726884	2010 CT_{145}	—	October 15, 2001	Palomar	NEAT	·	1.5 km	MPC · JPL
726885	2010 CO_{150}	—	February 14, 2010	Mount Lemmon	Mount Lemmon Survey	·	1.7 km	MPC · JPL
726886	2010 CD_{153}	—	January 11, 2010	Kitt Peak	Spacewatch	·	710 m	MPC · JPL
726887	2010 CM_{153}	—	February 14, 2010	Kitt Peak	Spacewatch	·	1.2 km	MPC · JPL
726888	2010 CN_{155}	—	February 15, 2010	Kitt Peak	Spacewatch	·	1.1 km	MPC · JPL
726889	2010 CB_{157}	—	February 15, 2010	Kitt Peak	Spacewatch	·	1.9 km	MPC · JPL
726890	2010 CG_{160}	—	February 9, 2010	Catalina	CSS	·	3.2 km	MPC · JPL
726891	2010 CK_{160}	—	November 27, 2009	Mount Lemmon	Mount Lemmon Survey	LIX	4.4 km	MPC · JPL
726892	2010 CA_{162}	—	December 24, 2005	Kitt Peak	Spacewatch	MAS	560 m	MPC · JPL
726893	2010 CS_{162}	—	January 6, 2010	Kitt Peak	Spacewatch	VER	2.3 km	MPC · JPL
726894	2010 CV_{167}	—	February 15, 2010	Mount Lemmon	Mount Lemmon Survey	·	4.1 km	MPC · JPL
726895	2010 CJ_{168}	—	February 15, 2010	Kitt Peak	Spacewatch	·	4.0 km	MPC · JPL
726896	2010 CU_{169}	—	August 29, 2002	Kitt Peak	Spacewatch	NAE	3.3 km	MPC · JPL
726897	2010 CP_{173}	—	February 9, 2010	Kitt Peak	Spacewatch	·	2.6 km	MPC · JPL
726898	2010 CG_{177}	—	February 10, 2010	Kitt Peak	Spacewatch	·	4.1 km	MPC · JPL
726899	2010 CP_{181}	—	February 16, 2010	Kitt Peak	Spacewatch	·	1.9 km	MPC · JPL
726900	2010 CR_{181}	—	February 15, 2010	Kitt Peak	Spacewatch	NYS	990 m	MPC · JPL

== 726901–727000 ==
back to top

Designation			Discovery			Properties		Ref
Permanent	Provisional	Named after	Date	Site	Discoverer(s)	Category	Diam.	Ref
726901	2010 CH_{182}	—	February 19, 2010	Mount Lemmon	Mount Lemmon Survey	·	3.1 km	MPC · JPL
726902	2010 CM_{182}	—	February 17, 2010	Mount Lemmon	Mount Lemmon Survey	·	2.1 km	MPC · JPL
726903	2010 CE_{184}	—	February 10, 2010	Siding Spring	SSS	PHO	1.3 km	MPC · JPL
726904	2010 CA_{187}	—	September 28, 2009	Mount Lemmon	Mount Lemmon Survey	·	2.0 km	MPC · JPL
726905	2010 CW_{189}	—	February 11, 2010	WISE	WISE	3:2	6.1 km	MPC · JPL
726906	2010 CC_{190}	—	August 19, 2006	Anderson Mesa	LONEOS	·	3.9 km	MPC · JPL
726907	2010 CX_{190}	—	March 16, 2007	Catalina	CSS	(116763)	2.1 km	MPC · JPL
726908	2010 CB_{191}	—	February 11, 2010	WISE	WISE	·	1.8 km	MPC · JPL
726909	2010 CW_{191}	—	November 8, 2007	Catalina	CSS	·	4.2 km	MPC · JPL
726910	2010 CY_{191}	—	January 28, 2017	Haleakala	Pan-STARRS 1	·	2.2 km	MPC · JPL
726911	2010 CA_{192}	—	February 12, 2010	WISE	WISE	·	2.9 km	MPC · JPL
726912	2010 CC_{192}	—	October 27, 2009	Kitt Peak	Spacewatch	·	1.0 km	MPC · JPL
726913	2010 CG_{192}	—	July 18, 2006	Mount Lemmon	Mount Lemmon Survey	·	4.0 km	MPC · JPL
726914	2010 CT_{193}	—	February 12, 2010	WISE	WISE	·	2.1 km	MPC · JPL
726915	2010 CW_{193}	—	February 12, 2010	WISE	WISE	·	3.8 km	MPC · JPL
726916	2010 CA_{194}	—	May 13, 2010	Mount Lemmon	Mount Lemmon Survey	·	2.3 km	MPC · JPL
726917	2010 CC_{194}	—	August 13, 2006	Palomar	NEAT	(7605)	5.3 km	MPC · JPL
726918	2010 CS_{194}	—	February 13, 2010	WISE	WISE	(1118)	2.8 km	MPC · JPL
726919	2010 CP_{198}	—	February 25, 2007	Kitt Peak	Spacewatch	·	910 m	MPC · JPL
726920	2010 CQ_{198}	—	August 14, 2001	Haleakala	NEAT	·	2.5 km	MPC · JPL
726921	2010 CT_{198}	—	February 14, 2010	WISE	WISE	·	2.3 km	MPC · JPL
726922	2010 CX_{198}	—	March 17, 2004	Palomar	NEAT	·	3.0 km	MPC · JPL
726923	2010 CA_{199}	—	February 14, 2010	WISE	WISE	·	2.2 km	MPC · JPL
726924	2010 CG_{199}	—	February 14, 2010	WISE	WISE	·	2.0 km	MPC · JPL
726925	2010 CJ_{199}	—	January 28, 2000	Kitt Peak	Spacewatch	·	3.1 km	MPC · JPL
726926	2010 CS_{199}	—	February 14, 2010	WISE	WISE	·	790 m	MPC · JPL
726927	2010 CY_{199}	—	June 3, 2005	Kitt Peak	Spacewatch	·	4.5 km	MPC · JPL
726928	2010 CL_{200}	—	November 19, 2007	Kitt Peak	Spacewatch	·	3.5 km	MPC · JPL
726929	2010 CS_{201}	—	February 15, 2010	WISE	WISE	·	2.8 km	MPC · JPL
726930	2010 CW_{201}	—	October 20, 2007	Mount Lemmon	Mount Lemmon Survey	EOS	6.6 km	MPC · JPL
726931	2010 CF_{202}	—	February 3, 2010	WISE	WISE	PHO	2.8 km	MPC · JPL
726932	2010 CJ_{203}	—	November 20, 2008	Mount Lemmon	Mount Lemmon Survey	EMA	3.7 km	MPC · JPL
726933	2010 CN_{203}	—	February 3, 2010	WISE	WISE	·	3.1 km	MPC · JPL
726934	2010 CT_{204}	—	October 18, 2009	Mount Lemmon	Mount Lemmon Survey	·	2.5 km	MPC · JPL
726935	2010 CB_{206}	—	November 21, 2009	Catalina	CSS	PHO	2.3 km	MPC · JPL
726936	2010 CL_{206}	—	September 3, 2007	Mount Lemmon	Mount Lemmon Survey	L4	13 km	MPC · JPL
726937	2010 CX_{207}	—	February 4, 2010	WISE	WISE	·	3.3 km	MPC · JPL
726938	2010 CL_{208}	—	February 13, 2011	Mount Lemmon	Mount Lemmon Survey	·	2.0 km	MPC · JPL
726939	2010 CS_{208}	—	October 27, 2009	Mount Lemmon	Mount Lemmon Survey	·	3.0 km	MPC · JPL
726940	2010 CL_{209}	—	October 27, 2009	Mount Lemmon	Mount Lemmon Survey	·	2.2 km	MPC · JPL
726941	2010 CL_{211}	—	February 5, 2010	WISE	WISE	·	2.8 km	MPC · JPL
726942	2010 CB_{214}	—	August 17, 2006	Palomar	NEAT	·	5.5 km	MPC · JPL
726943	2010 CC_{215}	—	October 14, 2009	Mount Lemmon	Mount Lemmon Survey	·	3.8 km	MPC · JPL
726944	2010 CQ_{215}	—	October 27, 2009	Mount Lemmon	Mount Lemmon Survey	·	3.5 km	MPC · JPL
726945	2010 CS_{215}	—	September 13, 2007	Kitt Peak	Spacewatch	·	1.5 km	MPC · JPL
726946	2010 CU_{215}	—	February 6, 2010	WISE	WISE	KON	2.3 km	MPC · JPL
726947	2010 CN_{216}	—	February 7, 2010	WISE	WISE	·	4.4 km	MPC · JPL
726948	2010 CL_{218}	—	February 7, 2010	WISE	WISE	L4	9.6 km	MPC · JPL
726949	2010 CE_{219}	—	October 17, 2006	Kitt Peak	Spacewatch	·	3.1 km	MPC · JPL
726950	2010 CP_{219}	—	October 26, 2009	Kitt Peak	Spacewatch	·	1.9 km	MPC · JPL
726951	2010 CS_{219}	—	November 11, 2009	Kitt Peak	Spacewatch	·	1.7 km	MPC · JPL
726952	2010 CT_{219}	—	September 5, 2008	Kitt Peak	Spacewatch	·	5.0 km	MPC · JPL
726953	2010 CK_{220}	—	January 16, 2009	Mount Lemmon	Mount Lemmon Survey	·	2.4 km	MPC · JPL
726954	2010 CX_{220}	—	November 22, 2009	Mount Lemmon	Mount Lemmon Survey	·	2.7 km	MPC · JPL
726955	2010 CY_{221}	—	February 8, 2010	WISE	WISE	·	1.4 km	MPC · JPL
726956	2010 CC_{223}	—	April 8, 2010	Kitt Peak	Spacewatch	·	2.5 km	MPC · JPL
726957	2010 CO_{224}	—	November 23, 2009	Kitt Peak	Spacewatch	(5)	1.1 km	MPC · JPL
726958	2010 CZ_{224}	—	November 22, 2009	Mount Lemmon	Mount Lemmon Survey	·	1.3 km	MPC · JPL
726959	2010 CB_{228}	—	May 11, 2010	Mount Lemmon	Mount Lemmon Survey	·	1.7 km	MPC · JPL
726960	2010 CY_{228}	—	February 9, 2010	WISE	WISE	L4 · HEK	9.3 km	MPC · JPL
726961	2010 CA_{229}	—	November 22, 2009	Mount Lemmon	Mount Lemmon Survey	·	3.0 km	MPC · JPL
726962	2010 CF_{229}	—	September 25, 2006	Kitt Peak	Spacewatch	·	2.1 km	MPC · JPL
726963	2010 CU_{229}	—	April 9, 2010	Kitt Peak	Spacewatch	·	1.7 km	MPC · JPL
726964	2010 CC_{230}	—	November 24, 2009	Mount Lemmon	Mount Lemmon Survey	·	4.7 km	MPC · JPL
726965	2010 CD_{230}	—	November 23, 2009	Mount Lemmon	Mount Lemmon Survey	·	2.3 km	MPC · JPL
726966	2010 CA_{231}	—	February 3, 2009	Mount Lemmon	Mount Lemmon Survey	·	2.6 km	MPC · JPL
726967	2010 CA_{232}	—	February 1, 2010	WISE	WISE	·	2.6 km	MPC · JPL
726968	2010 CU_{232}	—	February 1, 2010	WISE	WISE	KON	2.5 km	MPC · JPL
726969	2010 CE_{233}	—	December 20, 2009	Mount Lemmon	Mount Lemmon Survey	·	3.3 km	MPC · JPL
726970	2010 CS_{233}	—	February 1, 2010	WISE	WISE	T_{j} (2.97)	3.7 km	MPC · JPL
726971	2010 CU_{233}	—	February 1, 2010	WISE	WISE	·	2.3 km	MPC · JPL
726972	2010 CV_{233}	—	February 1, 2010	WISE	WISE	EOS	1.7 km	MPC · JPL
726973	2010 CL_{235}	—	September 30, 2003	Kitt Peak	Spacewatch	·	3.4 km	MPC · JPL
726974	2010 CY_{235}	—	July 25, 2010	WISE	WISE	·	2.4 km	MPC · JPL
726975	2010 CS_{236}	—	March 21, 2010	Mount Lemmon	Mount Lemmon Survey	·	3.5 km	MPC · JPL
726976	2010 CG_{237}	—	September 19, 2003	Palomar	NEAT	·	3.1 km	MPC · JPL
726977	2010 CJ_{237}	—	September 28, 2003	Kitt Peak	Spacewatch	·	2.7 km	MPC · JPL
726978	2010 CF_{238}	—	February 1, 2010	WISE	WISE	·	3.2 km	MPC · JPL
726979	2010 CL_{238}	—	September 22, 2003	Palomar	NEAT	·	3.0 km	MPC · JPL
726980	2010 CQ_{238}	—	May 4, 2010	Catalina	CSS	·	2.1 km	MPC · JPL
726981	2010 CW_{238}	—	February 2, 2010	WISE	WISE	PHO	2.7 km	MPC · JPL
726982	2010 CB_{239}	—	February 2, 2010	WISE	WISE	·	2.8 km	MPC · JPL
726983	2010 CR_{240}	—	February 2, 2010	WISE	WISE	L4	8.9 km	MPC · JPL
726984	2010 CX_{240}	—	July 30, 2008	Kitt Peak	Spacewatch	·	5.5 km	MPC · JPL
726985	2010 CA_{241}	—	March 14, 2004	Socorro	LINEAR	·	2.8 km	MPC · JPL
726986	2010 CA_{243}	—	October 24, 2009	Mount Lemmon	Mount Lemmon Survey	·	1.6 km	MPC · JPL
726987	2010 CJ_{243}	—	October 27, 2009	Mount Lemmon	Mount Lemmon Survey	L4	12 km	MPC · JPL
726988	2010 CZ_{245}	—	November 19, 2009	Catalina	CSS	·	3.3 km	MPC · JPL
726989	2010 CR_{246}	—	November 16, 2009	Mount Lemmon	Mount Lemmon Survey	HOF	2.3 km	MPC · JPL
726990	2010 CX_{246}	—	May 13, 2010	Mount Lemmon	Mount Lemmon Survey	LIX	4.2 km	MPC · JPL
726991	2010 CP_{247}	—	July 27, 2010	WISE	WISE	·	1.4 km	MPC · JPL
726992	2010 CP_{249}	—	February 13, 2010	Mount Lemmon	Mount Lemmon Survey	·	1.1 km	MPC · JPL
726993	2010 CZ_{249}	—	February 14, 2010	Mount Lemmon	Mount Lemmon Survey	·	770 m	MPC · JPL
726994	2010 CZ_{250}	—	February 17, 2010	Mount Lemmon	Mount Lemmon Survey	MRX	820 m	MPC · JPL
726995	2010 CB_{254}	—	April 3, 2017	Haleakala	Pan-STARRS 1	·	1.5 km	MPC · JPL
726996	2010 CM_{257}	—	January 2, 2009	Kitt Peak	Spacewatch	EUN	1.0 km	MPC · JPL
726997	2010 CT_{260}	—	February 9, 2010	WISE	WISE	EOS	1.3 km	MPC · JPL
726998	2010 CY_{266}	—	February 28, 2009	Mount Lemmon	Mount Lemmon Survey	·	2.7 km	MPC · JPL
726999	2010 CJ_{270}	—	February 14, 2010	Mount Lemmon	Mount Lemmon Survey	T_{j} (2.98)	3.1 km	MPC · JPL
727000	2010 CV_{271}	—	December 30, 2013	Mount Lemmon	Mount Lemmon Survey	MAR	890 m	MPC · JPL

== Meaning of names ==
As minor planet discoveries are confirmed, they are given a permanent number by the IAU's Minor Planet Center (MPC), and the discoverers can then submit names for them, following the IAU's naming conventions. The list below concerns those minor planets in the specified number-range that have received names, and explains the meanings of those names.

Official naming citations of newly named small Solar System bodies are approved and published in a bulletin by IAU's Working Group for Small Bodies Nomenclature (WGSBN). Before May 2021, citations were published in MPC's Minor Planet Circulars for many decades. Recent citations can also be found on the JPL Small-Body Database (SBDB). Until his death in 2016, German astronomer Lutz D. Schmadel compiled these citations into the Dictionary of Minor Planet Names (DMP) and regularly updated the collection.

Based on Paul Herget's The Names of the Minor Planets, Schmadel also researched the unclear origin of numerous asteroids, most of which had been named prior to World War II. This article incorporates text from this source, which is in the public domain: SBDB New namings may only be added to this list below after official publication as the preannouncement of names is condemned. The WGSBN publishes a comprehensive guideline for the naming rules of non-cometary small Solar System bodies.

Named minor planet	Provisional	This minor planet was named for...	Ref · Catalog
726023 Berényróbert	2009 RB_{1}	Róbert Berény, Hungarian painter, graphic artist and prominent representative of the Hungarian avant-garde movement.	IAU · 726023
