= List of minor planets: 721001–722000 =

The following is a partial list of minor planets, running from minor-planet number 721001 through 722000, inclusive. The primary data for this and other partial lists is based on JPL's "Small-Body Orbital Elements" and data available from the Minor Planet Center. Critical list information is also provided by the MPC, unless otherwise specified from Lowell Observatory. A detailed description of the table's columns and additional sources are given on the main page including a complete list of every page in this series, and a statistical break-up on the dynamical classification of minor planets.

Also see the summary list of all named bodies in numerical and alphabetical order, and the corresponding naming citations for the number range of this particular list. New namings may only be added to this list after official publication, as the preannouncement of names is condemned by the Working Group for Small Bodies Nomenclature of the International Astronomical Union.

Near-Earth obj.	MBA (inner)	MBA (outer)	Centaur
Mars-crosser	MBA (middle)	Jupiter trojan	Trans-Neptunian obj.
Unclassified

== 721001–721100 ==
Designation			Discovery			Properties		Ref
Permanent	Provisional	Named after	Date	Site	Discoverer(s)	Category	Diam.	Ref
721001	2002 TE_{309}	—	October 4, 2002	Apache Point	SDSS Collaboration	EOS	1.8 km	MPC · JPL
721002	2002 TR_{310}	—	September 17, 2002	Haleakala	NEAT	·	830 m	MPC · JPL
721003	2002 TW_{312}	—	October 4, 2002	Apache Point	SDSS Collaboration	VER	2.4 km	MPC · JPL
721004	2002 TZ_{313}	—	October 10, 2002	Palomar	NEAT	DOR	2.2 km	MPC · JPL
721005	2002 TQ_{316}	—	October 4, 2002	Apache Point	SDSS Collaboration	·	890 m	MPC · JPL
721006	2002 TY_{316}	—	January 24, 2003	La Silla	A. Boattini, Hainaut, O.	PHO	910 m	MPC · JPL
721007	2002 TJ_{317}	—	October 5, 2002	Apache Point	SDSS Collaboration	·	1.7 km	MPC · JPL
721008	2002 TB_{318}	—	October 21, 2007	Kitt Peak	Spacewatch	·	1.7 km	MPC · JPL
721009	2002 TJ_{319}	—	September 14, 2002	Palomar	NEAT	·	2.7 km	MPC · JPL
721010	2002 TD_{321}	—	March 17, 2005	Kitt Peak	Spacewatch	·	2.0 km	MPC · JPL
721011	2002 TF_{322}	—	October 5, 2002	Apache Point	SDSS	·	1.3 km	MPC · JPL
721012	2002 TH_{325}	—	October 5, 2002	Apache Point	SDSS Collaboration	·	1.9 km	MPC · JPL
721013	2002 TB_{326}	—	October 5, 2002	Apache Point	SDSS Collaboration	WIT	820 m	MPC · JPL
721014	2002 TP_{328}	—	October 5, 2002	Apache Point	SDSS Collaboration	·	1.3 km	MPC · JPL
721015	2002 TW_{328}	—	October 5, 2002	Apache Point	SDSS Collaboration	NYS	1.1 km	MPC · JPL
721016	2002 TJ_{330}	—	April 12, 2005	Kitt Peak	Spacewatch	·	1.3 km	MPC · JPL
721017	2002 TY_{330}	—	October 5, 2002	Apache Point	SDSS Collaboration	KOR	1.6 km	MPC · JPL
721018	2002 TD_{331}	—	October 5, 2002	Apache Point	SDSS Collaboration	·	960 m	MPC · JPL
721019	2002 TU_{331}	—	January 8, 1999	Kitt Peak	Spacewatch	·	2.4 km	MPC · JPL
721020	2002 TH_{332}	—	October 5, 2002	Apache Point	SDSS Collaboration	EOS	1.6 km	MPC · JPL
721021	2002 TS_{332}	—	October 5, 2002	Apache Point	SDSS	EOS	1.7 km	MPC · JPL
721022	2002 TQ_{334}	—	September 28, 2002	Haleakala	NEAT	·	1.1 km	MPC · JPL
721023	2002 TD_{335}	—	October 5, 2002	Apache Point	SDSS Collaboration	·	710 m	MPC · JPL
721024	2002 TZ_{335}	—	October 5, 2002	Apache Point	SDSS Collaboration	·	1.4 km	MPC · JPL
721025	2002 TD_{340}	—	October 5, 2002	Apache Point	SDSS Collaboration	·	2.7 km	MPC · JPL
721026	2002 TG_{340}	—	October 7, 2008	Mount Lemmon	Mount Lemmon Survey	·	5.6 km	MPC · JPL
721027	2002 TV_{340}	—	October 15, 2002	Palomar	NEAT	·	2.9 km	MPC · JPL
721028	2002 TO_{341}	—	October 15, 2002	Palomar	NEAT	(5)	1.0 km	MPC · JPL
721029	2002 TB_{342}	—	October 15, 2002	Palomar	NEAT	·	1.3 km	MPC · JPL
721030	2002 TX_{342}	—	October 15, 2002	Palomar	NEAT	·	1.8 km	MPC · JPL
721031	2002 TE_{343}	—	October 30, 2002	Socorro	LINEAR	·	670 m	MPC · JPL
721032	2002 TJ_{343}	—	October 15, 2002	Palomar	NEAT	·	2.4 km	MPC · JPL
721033	2002 TX_{343}	—	October 15, 2002	Palomar	NEAT	·	1.2 km	MPC · JPL
721034	2002 TL_{345}	—	April 11, 2005	Kitt Peak	Spacewatch	·	1.7 km	MPC · JPL
721035	2002 TU_{345}	—	October 5, 2002	Apache Point	SDSS Collaboration	VER	2.5 km	MPC · JPL
721036	2002 TX_{345}	—	October 3, 2002	Campo Imperatore	CINEOS	·	1.5 km	MPC · JPL
721037	2002 TA_{347}	—	January 30, 2011	Mount Lemmon	Mount Lemmon Survey	V	510 m	MPC · JPL
721038	2002 TD_{347}	—	October 5, 2002	Apache Point	SDSS Collaboration	·	1.1 km	MPC · JPL
721039	2002 TV_{348}	—	October 5, 2002	Apache Point	SDSS Collaboration	·	2.1 km	MPC · JPL
721040	2002 TS_{349}	—	October 10, 2002	Apache Point	SDSS	·	2.9 km	MPC · JPL
721041	2002 TC_{350}	—	December 19, 2004	Mount Lemmon	Mount Lemmon Survey	·	4.8 km	MPC · JPL
721042	2002 TT_{351}	—	October 10, 2002	Apache Point	SDSS Collaboration	centaur	10 km	MPC · JPL
721043	2002 TB_{354}	—	October 10, 2002	Apache Point	SDSS Collaboration	·	1.0 km	MPC · JPL
721044	2002 TA_{356}	—	September 11, 2002	Palomar	NEAT	·	600 m	MPC · JPL
721045	2002 TL_{358}	—	October 10, 2002	Apache Point	SDSS Collaboration	KOR	1.2 km	MPC · JPL
721046	2002 TW_{358}	—	November 7, 2002	Kitt Peak	Deep Ecliptic Survey	·	790 m	MPC · JPL
721047	2002 TO_{359}	—	April 6, 2005	Mount Lemmon	Mount Lemmon Survey	·	1.6 km	MPC · JPL
721048	2002 TV_{359}	—	October 10, 2002	Apache Point	SDSS Collaboration	NYS	910 m	MPC · JPL
721049	2002 TL_{360}	—	February 11, 2004	Kitt Peak	Spacewatch	·	1.3 km	MPC · JPL
721050	2002 TP_{360}	—	September 26, 2002	Palomar	NEAT	·	2.8 km	MPC · JPL
721051	2002 TA_{361}	—	October 10, 2002	Apache Point	SDSS Collaboration	·	1.1 km	MPC · JPL
721052	2002 TO_{361}	—	October 10, 2002	Apache Point	SDSS Collaboration	·	1.7 km	MPC · JPL
721053	2002 TL_{364}	—	October 15, 2002	Palomar	NEAT	·	1.3 km	MPC · JPL
721054	2002 TV_{365}	—	October 10, 2002	Apache Point	SDSS Collaboration	·	1.3 km	MPC · JPL
721055	2002 TC_{366}	—	October 15, 2002	Palomar	NEAT	·	630 m	MPC · JPL
721056	2002 TO_{366}	—	October 6, 2002	Haleakala	NEAT	·	1.2 km	MPC · JPL
721057	2002 TZ_{366}	—	October 15, 2002	Palomar	NEAT	·	2.5 km	MPC · JPL
721058	2002 TQ_{367}	—	March 31, 2005	Kitt Peak	Spacewatch	·	1.1 km	MPC · JPL
721059	2002 TS_{370}	—	October 10, 2002	Apache Point	SDSS Collaboration	·	2.3 km	MPC · JPL
721060	2002 TC_{372}	—	November 6, 2002	Palomar	NEAT	·	2.9 km	MPC · JPL
721061	2002 TC_{377}	—	October 3, 2002	Palomar	NEAT	EUN	1.0 km	MPC · JPL
721062	2002 TF_{377}	—	October 9, 2002	Palomar	NEAT	·	2.9 km	MPC · JPL
721063	2002 TM_{377}	—	March 9, 2005	Mount Lemmon	Mount Lemmon Survey	·	3.1 km	MPC · JPL
721064	2002 TY_{377}	—	October 3, 2002	Palomar	NEAT	·	1.3 km	MPC · JPL
721065	2002 TN_{378}	—	October 15, 2002	Palomar	NEAT	·	840 m	MPC · JPL
721066	2002 TK_{383}	—	October 3, 2002	Palomar	NEAT	·	2.8 km	MPC · JPL
721067	2002 TY_{384}	—	October 4, 2002	Palomar	NEAT	·	860 m	MPC · JPL
721068	2002 TN_{386}	—	October 4, 2002	Palomar	NEAT	·	1.3 km	MPC · JPL
721069	2002 TG_{387}	—	March 10, 2005	Catalina	CSS	·	4.8 km	MPC · JPL
721070	2002 TX_{387}	—	September 29, 2019	Haleakala	Pan-STARRS 1	·	670 m	MPC · JPL
721071	2002 TP_{388}	—	July 2, 2008	Kitt Peak	Spacewatch	·	3.5 km	MPC · JPL
721072	2002 TL_{389}	—	September 25, 2009	Kitt Peak	Spacewatch	·	690 m	MPC · JPL
721073	2002 TN_{389}	—	January 16, 2011	Mount Lemmon	Mount Lemmon Survey	·	940 m	MPC · JPL
721074	2002 TX_{390}	—	October 27, 2009	Mount Lemmon	Mount Lemmon Survey	·	3.3 km	MPC · JPL
721075	2002 TR_{391}	—	September 10, 2007	Mount Lemmon	Mount Lemmon Survey	THM	2.2 km	MPC · JPL
721076	2002 TC_{392}	—	March 17, 2017	Mount Lemmon	Mount Lemmon Survey	·	1.1 km	MPC · JPL
721077	2002 TW_{393}	—	November 7, 2015	Mount Lemmon	Mount Lemmon Survey	·	1.0 km	MPC · JPL
721078	2002 TB_{394}	—	November 6, 2008	Kitt Peak	Spacewatch	·	3.5 km	MPC · JPL
721079	2002 UM_{14}	—	October 30, 2002	Palomar	NEAT	·	1.4 km	MPC · JPL
721080	2002 UH_{30}	—	October 30, 2002	Kitt Peak	Spacewatch	·	3.1 km	MPC · JPL
721081	2002 UK_{42}	—	October 30, 2002	Kitt Peak	Spacewatch	·	1.3 km	MPC · JPL
721082	2002 UQ_{42}	—	October 30, 2002	Kitt Peak	Spacewatch	·	1.5 km	MPC · JPL
721083	2002 UY_{42}	—	October 15, 2002	Palomar	NEAT	·	720 m	MPC · JPL
721084	2002 UX_{43}	—	October 30, 2002	Kitt Peak	Spacewatch	·	2.2 km	MPC · JPL
721085	2002 UA_{50}	—	November 7, 2002	Kitt Peak	Deep Ecliptic Survey	·	2.7 km	MPC · JPL
721086	2002 UN_{50}	—	June 20, 2002	Kitt Peak	Spacewatch	·	1.5 km	MPC · JPL
721087	2002 UJ_{52}	—	October 29, 2002	Apache Point	SDSS Collaboration	·	1.5 km	MPC · JPL
721088	2002 UG_{53}	—	October 29, 2002	Apache Point	SDSS Collaboration	·	1.8 km	MPC · JPL
721089	2002 UK_{53}	—	October 10, 2002	Palomar	NEAT	EUN	950 m	MPC · JPL
721090	2002 UB_{55}	—	October 29, 2002	Apache Point	SDSS Collaboration	·	720 m	MPC · JPL
721091	2002 UB_{57}	—	October 29, 2002	Apache Point	SDSS Collaboration	VER	2.1 km	MPC · JPL
721092	2002 UF_{58}	—	December 19, 2003	Kitt Peak	Spacewatch	·	2.6 km	MPC · JPL
721093	2002 UK_{59}	—	September 9, 2013	Haleakala	Pan-STARRS 1	VER	2.1 km	MPC · JPL
721094	2002 UJ_{62}	—	October 30, 2002	Apache Point	SDSS Collaboration	·	1.3 km	MPC · JPL
721095	2002 UW_{63}	—	October 30, 2002	Apache Point	SDSS Collaboration	·	780 m	MPC · JPL
721096	2002 UP_{66}	—	October 30, 2002	Apache Point	SDSS Collaboration	V	650 m	MPC · JPL
721097	2002 UB_{71}	—	October 30, 2002	Palomar	NEAT	·	1.7 km	MPC · JPL
721098	2002 UR_{71}	—	November 1, 2002	Palomar	NEAT	·	780 m	MPC · JPL
721099	2002 UA_{72}	—	October 30, 2002	Palomar	NEAT	NYS	880 m	MPC · JPL
721100	2002 UK_{75}	—	October 13, 2002	Kitt Peak	Spacewatch	TIR	2.8 km	MPC · JPL

== 721101–721200 ==
back to top

Designation			Discovery			Properties		Ref
Permanent	Provisional	Named after	Date	Site	Discoverer(s)	Category	Diam.	Ref
721101	2002 UX_{76}	—	October 31, 2002	Palomar	NEAT	·	830 m	MPC · JPL
721102	2002 UZ_{79}	—	September 25, 2006	Catalina	CSS	·	2.2 km	MPC · JPL
721103	2002 UB_{81}	—	November 3, 2008	Mount Lemmon	Mount Lemmon Survey	·	3.1 km	MPC · JPL
721104	2002 UC_{81}	—	November 1, 2013	Catalina	CSS	NYS	970 m	MPC · JPL
721105	2002 UK_{81}	—	October 24, 2011	Haleakala	Pan-STARRS 1	·	1.4 km	MPC · JPL
721106	2002 UU_{81}	—	August 7, 2013	Kitt Peak	Spacewatch	EOS	1.6 km	MPC · JPL
721107	2002 VE_{1}	—	November 1, 2002	La Palma	A. Fitzsimmons	·	1.5 km	MPC · JPL
721108	2002 VX_{5}	—	November 3, 2002	La Palma	A. Fitzsimmons	·	1.6 km	MPC · JPL
721109	2002 VO_{18}	—	November 2, 2002	Kvistaberg	Uppsala-DLR Asteroid Survey	·	2.1 km	MPC · JPL
721110	2002 VZ_{42}	—	November 4, 2002	Palomar	NEAT	·	1.4 km	MPC · JPL
721111	2002 VH_{95}	—	November 11, 2002	Socorro	LINEAR	·	3.2 km	MPC · JPL
721112	2002 VX_{117}	—	November 13, 2002	Socorro	LINEAR	PHO	1.4 km	MPC · JPL
721113	2002 VV_{132}	—	October 20, 2002	Palomar	NEAT	H	610 m	MPC · JPL
721114	2002 VZ_{134}	—	November 2, 2002	Haleakala	NEAT	·	3.3 km	MPC · JPL
721115	2002 VL_{138}	—	October 16, 2006	Mount Lemmon	Mount Lemmon Survey	·	890 m	MPC · JPL
721116	2002 VB_{139}	—	November 15, 2002	Palomar	NEAT	·	1.2 km	MPC · JPL
721117	2002 VJ_{140}	—	November 5, 2002	Palomar	NEAT	·	3.2 km	MPC · JPL
721118	2002 VA_{148}	—	November 4, 2002	Palomar	NEAT	·	1.7 km	MPC · JPL
721119	2002 VJ_{149}	—	May 10, 2005	Mount Lemmon	Mount Lemmon Survey	·	3.9 km	MPC · JPL
721120	2002 VK_{149}	—	January 11, 2008	Kitt Peak	Spacewatch	·	1.4 km	MPC · JPL
721121	2002 VZ_{149}	—	January 16, 2011	Mount Lemmon	Mount Lemmon Survey	MAS	760 m	MPC · JPL
721122	2002 VD_{150}	—	March 31, 2011	Haleakala	Pan-STARRS 1	NYS	950 m	MPC · JPL
721123	2002 VT_{150}	—	February 25, 2011	Mount Lemmon	Mount Lemmon Survey	·	810 m	MPC · JPL
721124	2002 VA_{151}	—	December 10, 2013	Mount Lemmon	Mount Lemmon Survey	·	910 m	MPC · JPL
721125	2002 VZ_{151}	—	April 28, 2010	WISE	WISE	T_{j} (2.99) · EUP	3.7 km	MPC · JPL
721126	2002 VN_{152}	—	November 5, 2002	Kitt Peak	Spacewatch	·	2.0 km	MPC · JPL
721127	2002 VW_{153}	—	October 8, 2008	Mount Lemmon	Mount Lemmon Survey	·	2.3 km	MPC · JPL
721128	2002 VA_{154}	—	April 10, 2013	Haleakala	Pan-STARRS 1	·	1.1 km	MPC · JPL
721129	2002 WS_{10}	—	November 24, 2002	Palomar	NEAT	·	2.2 km	MPC · JPL
721130	2002 WE_{22}	—	November 16, 2002	Palomar	NEAT	·	2.3 km	MPC · JPL
721131	2002 WD_{30}	—	November 7, 2008	Mount Lemmon	Mount Lemmon Survey	·	4.5 km	MPC · JPL
721132	2002 WL_{31}	—	November 28, 2002	Haleakala	NEAT	·	3.2 km	MPC · JPL
721133	2002 WD_{32}	—	October 13, 2007	Catalina	CSS	·	4.1 km	MPC · JPL
721134	2002 WK_{32}	—	April 27, 2010	WISE	WISE	T_{j} (2.99)	4.0 km	MPC · JPL
721135	2002 XC_{11}	—	December 3, 2002	Palomar	NEAT	·	2.2 km	MPC · JPL
721136	2002 XG_{19}	—	November 4, 2002	Palomar	NEAT	·	1.1 km	MPC · JPL
721137	2002 XM_{24}	—	December 5, 2002	Socorro	LINEAR	·	2.7 km	MPC · JPL
721138	2002 XM_{53}	—	December 10, 2002	Palomar	NEAT	JUN	1.2 km	MPC · JPL
721139	2002 XV_{53}	—	December 1, 2002	Socorro	LINEAR	·	1.6 km	MPC · JPL
721140	2002 XG_{99}	—	November 28, 2002	Haleakala	NEAT	·	4.5 km	MPC · JPL
721141	2002 XN_{107}	—	December 5, 2002	Socorro	LINEAR	·	4.2 km	MPC · JPL
721142	2002 XO_{113}	—	December 6, 2002	Socorro	LINEAR	TIR	2.7 km	MPC · JPL
721143	2002 XW_{120}	—	August 20, 2009	Kitt Peak	Spacewatch	·	840 m	MPC · JPL
721144	2002 XF_{122}	—	February 9, 2008	Kitt Peak	Spacewatch	·	1.2 km	MPC · JPL
721145	2002 XQ_{123}	—	April 14, 2015	Mount Lemmon	Mount Lemmon Survey	·	1.6 km	MPC · JPL
721146	2002 YQ_{4}	—	December 27, 2002	Socorro	LINEAR	T_{j} (2.94)	4.6 km	MPC · JPL
721147	2003 AS_{9}	—	January 3, 2003	Kitt Peak	Spacewatch	·	3.0 km	MPC · JPL
721148	2003 AN_{15}	—	January 4, 2003	Socorro	LINEAR	·	1.7 km	MPC · JPL
721149	2003 AU_{63}	—	January 8, 2003	Socorro	LINEAR	V	750 m	MPC · JPL
721150	2003 AD_{83}	—	January 4, 2003	Kitt Peak	Deep Lens Survey	·	2.3 km	MPC · JPL
721151	2003 AF_{83}	—	January 4, 2003	Kitt Peak	Deep Lens Survey	·	980 m	MPC · JPL
721152	2003 AF_{93}	—	January 1, 2003	La Silla	F. Hormuth	·	2.5 km	MPC · JPL
721153 Gunda	2003 AM_{93}	Gunda	January 7, 2003	La Silla	F. Hormuth	·	1.6 km	MPC · JPL
721154 Heinz	2003 AQ_{93}	Heinz	January 7, 2003	La Silla	F. Hormuth	·	1.9 km	MPC · JPL
721155	2003 AW_{95}	—	February 15, 2010	WISE	WISE	·	3.1 km	MPC · JPL
721156	2003 BV_{1}	—	January 23, 2003	Kitt Peak	Spacewatch	·	1.6 km	MPC · JPL
721157	2003 BK_{3}	—	January 24, 2003	La Silla	A. Boattini, Hainaut, O.	V	540 m	MPC · JPL
721158	2003 BE_{8}	—	January 26, 2003	Anderson Mesa	LONEOS	·	2.4 km	MPC · JPL
721159	2003 BE_{15}	—	January 26, 2003	Haleakala	NEAT	PHO	1.1 km	MPC · JPL
721160	2003 BC_{23}	—	January 10, 2003	Goodricke-Pigott	R. A. Tucker	·	3.2 km	MPC · JPL
721161	2003 BR_{85}	—	July 12, 2005	Kitt Peak	Spacewatch	·	1.9 km	MPC · JPL
721162	2003 BZ_{93}	—	January 30, 2003	Kitt Peak	Spacewatch	·	1.5 km	MPC · JPL
721163	2003 BB_{94}	—	January 27, 2003	Kitt Peak	Spacewatch	·	1.3 km	MPC · JPL
721164	2003 BC_{94}	—	January 25, 2003	Apache Point	SDSS Collaboration	·	1.6 km	MPC · JPL
721165	2003 BK_{95}	—	January 28, 2003	Apache Point	SDSS Collaboration	URS	3.4 km	MPC · JPL
721166	2003 BP_{95}	—	February 21, 2007	Kitt Peak	Spacewatch	·	1.2 km	MPC · JPL
721167	2003 BK_{96}	—	September 20, 2006	Catalina	CSS	·	2.5 km	MPC · JPL
721168	2003 BO_{96}	—	April 6, 2008	Mount Lemmon	Mount Lemmon Survey	·	1.6 km	MPC · JPL
721169	2003 BP_{96}	—	October 14, 2012	Kitt Peak	Spacewatch	·	2.6 km	MPC · JPL
721170	2003 BQ_{96}	—	August 18, 2009	Kitt Peak	Spacewatch	·	1.2 km	MPC · JPL
721171	2003 BU_{96}	—	December 15, 2007	Kitt Peak	Spacewatch	EMA	2.5 km	MPC · JPL
721172	2003 BE_{97}	—	October 19, 2012	Mount Lemmon	Mount Lemmon Survey	·	2.6 km	MPC · JPL
721173	2003 BR_{97}	—	August 19, 2014	Haleakala	Pan-STARRS 1	·	840 m	MPC · JPL
721174	2003 BN_{99}	—	January 28, 2003	Kitt Peak	Spacewatch	3:2	5.2 km	MPC · JPL
721175	2003 BY_{99}	—	February 1, 2009	Kitt Peak	Spacewatch	·	2.4 km	MPC · JPL
721176	2003 BK_{102}	—	January 23, 2015	Haleakala	Pan-STARRS 1	·	2.7 km	MPC · JPL
721177	2003 BQ_{102}	—	April 8, 2010	WISE	WISE	THB	3.1 km	MPC · JPL
721178	2003 BR_{102}	—	September 12, 2007	Mount Lemmon	Mount Lemmon Survey	·	2.6 km	MPC · JPL
721179	2003 BT_{102}	—	June 27, 2014	Haleakala	Pan-STARRS 1	·	1.6 km	MPC · JPL
721180	2003 CH_{26}	—	February 3, 2003	Haleakala	NEAT	·	1.8 km	MPC · JPL
721181	2003 CZ_{26}	—	February 1, 2003	Palomar	NEAT	URS	3.1 km	MPC · JPL
721182	2003 CB_{27}	—	February 1, 2003	Palomar	NEAT	·	1.1 km	MPC · JPL
721183	2003 CF_{27}	—	February 22, 2014	Calar Alto-CASADO	Mottola, S., Hellmich, S.	·	1.7 km	MPC · JPL
721184	2003 CW_{27}	—	February 14, 2010	WISE	WISE	·	3.1 km	MPC · JPL
721185	2003 CE_{28}	—	October 5, 2018	Haleakala	Pan-STARRS 2	·	2.4 km	MPC · JPL
721186	2003 CH_{28}	—	September 4, 2011	Haleakala	Pan-STARRS 1	·	520 m	MPC · JPL
721187	2003 DY_{2}	—	February 22, 2003	Kitt Peak	Spacewatch	·	700 m	MPC · JPL
721188	2003 DH_{25}	—	February 26, 2003	Campo Imperatore	CINEOS	(2076)	620 m	MPC · JPL
721189	2003 DP_{25}	—	June 27, 2014	Haleakala	Pan-STARRS 1	BRA	1.4 km	MPC · JPL
721190	2003 EZ_{64}	—	March 10, 2003	Kitt Peak	Spacewatch	·	1.4 km	MPC · JPL
721191	2003 FB_{8}	—	March 30, 2003	Socorro	LINEAR	H	500 m	MPC · JPL
721192	2003 FA_{9}	—	March 31, 2003	Palomar	NEAT	·	1.7 km	MPC · JPL
721193	2003 FJ_{14}	—	March 23, 2003	Kitt Peak	Spacewatch	·	4.0 km	MPC · JPL
721194	2003 FG_{28}	—	March 24, 2003	Kitt Peak	Spacewatch	·	3.6 km	MPC · JPL
721195	2003 FY_{71}	—	March 26, 2003	Haleakala	NEAT	·	2.5 km	MPC · JPL
721196	2003 FM_{73}	—	March 26, 2003	Palomar	NEAT	·	2.5 km	MPC · JPL
721197	2003 FP_{73}	—	March 27, 2003	Socorro	LINEAR	·	2.3 km	MPC · JPL
721198	2003 FW_{102}	—	April 3, 2003	Haleakala	NEAT	PHO	980 m	MPC · JPL
721199	2003 FN_{128}	—	April 8, 2008	Kitt Peak	Spacewatch	·	1.3 km	MPC · JPL
721200	2003 FB_{134}	—	September 19, 2001	Kitt Peak	Spacewatch	(5)	930 m	MPC · JPL

== 721201–721300 ==
back to top

Designation			Discovery			Properties		Ref
Permanent	Provisional	Named after	Date	Site	Discoverer(s)	Category	Diam.	Ref
721201	2003 FK_{134}	—	March 23, 2003	Apache Point	SDSS Collaboration	VER	2.4 km	MPC · JPL
721202	2003 FG_{135}	—	June 30, 2013	Haleakala	Pan-STARRS 1	·	2.2 km	MPC · JPL
721203	2003 FM_{136}	—	November 23, 2009	Kitt Peak	Spacewatch	ERI	1.2 km	MPC · JPL
721204	2003 FX_{137}	—	February 21, 2012	Mount Lemmon	Mount Lemmon Survey	·	1.7 km	MPC · JPL
721205	2003 FR_{138}	—	November 21, 2014	Haleakala	Pan-STARRS 1	·	1.1 km	MPC · JPL
721206	2003 FV_{138}	—	March 13, 2016	Haleakala	Pan-STARRS 1	·	3.1 km	MPC · JPL
721207	2003 FX_{139}	—	March 31, 2003	Apache Point	SDSS	L4	7.7 km	MPC · JPL
721208	2003 FH_{140}	—	March 23, 2003	Apache Point	SDSS Collaboration	·	2.3 km	MPC · JPL
721209	2003 FM_{140}	—	March 23, 2003	Apache Point	SDSS Collaboration	EOS	1.8 km	MPC · JPL
721210	2003 FW_{140}	—	March 16, 2008	Kitt Peak	Spacewatch	·	1.8 km	MPC · JPL
721211	2003 FR_{141}	—	March 23, 2003	Apache Point	SDSS Collaboration	·	1.6 km	MPC · JPL
721212	2003 GY_{21}	—	April 7, 2003	Palomar	NEAT	EUP	4.0 km	MPC · JPL
721213	2003 GG_{38}	—	March 29, 2003	Anderson Mesa	LONEOS	ERI	1.5 km	MPC · JPL
721214	2003 GU_{57}	—	April 1, 2003	Apache Point	SDSS Collaboration	PHO	860 m	MPC · JPL
721215	2003 GL_{59}	—	October 12, 2010	Kitt Peak	Spacewatch	·	1.6 km	MPC · JPL
721216	2003 GN_{59}	—	May 20, 2010	Mount Lemmon	Mount Lemmon Survey	·	580 m	MPC · JPL
721217	2003 GQ_{60}	—	August 31, 2011	Haleakala	Pan-STARRS 1	MAS	610 m	MPC · JPL
721218	2003 GB_{61}	—	May 4, 2010	WISE	WISE	·	3.0 km	MPC · JPL
721219	2003 GJ_{61}	—	April 1, 2003	Apache Point	SDSS Collaboration	·	3.6 km	MPC · JPL
721220	2003 GW_{61}	—	April 24, 2014	Haleakala	Pan-STARRS 1	·	1.0 km	MPC · JPL
721221	2003 GR_{62}	—	November 14, 2017	Mount Lemmon	Mount Lemmon Survey	MAR	1.0 km	MPC · JPL
721222	2003 GU_{62}	—	June 15, 2016	Mount Lemmon	Mount Lemmon Survey	·	1.3 km	MPC · JPL
721223	2003 GX_{62}	—	August 27, 2016	Haleakala	Pan-STARRS 1	·	1.1 km	MPC · JPL
721224	2003 GY_{62}	—	March 14, 2007	Kitt Peak	Spacewatch	MAS	650 m	MPC · JPL
721225	2003 GK_{63}	—	April 18, 2010	WISE	WISE	·	3.1 km	MPC · JPL
721226	2003 HZ_{16}	—	April 24, 2003	Anderson Mesa	LONEOS	PHO	1.5 km	MPC · JPL
721227	2003 HA_{19}	—	April 10, 2003	Kitt Peak	Spacewatch	·	1.3 km	MPC · JPL
721228	2003 HO_{22}	—	April 24, 2003	Kitt Peak	Spacewatch	·	2.6 km	MPC · JPL
721229	2003 HX_{59}	—	April 25, 2003	Kitt Peak	Spacewatch	·	560 m	MPC · JPL
721230	2003 HN_{60}	—	June 24, 2011	Mount Lemmon	Mount Lemmon Survey	H	420 m	MPC · JPL
721231	2003 HY_{60}	—	March 7, 2017	Haleakala	Pan-STARRS 1	·	1.7 km	MPC · JPL
721232	2003 HH_{61}	—	March 26, 2010	WISE	WISE	·	970 m	MPC · JPL
721233	2003 HH_{63}	—	October 23, 1995	Kitt Peak	Spacewatch	·	2.0 km	MPC · JPL
721234	2003 HO_{64}	—	August 10, 2010	WISE	WISE	·	3.2 km	MPC · JPL
721235	2003 HW_{65}	—	April 24, 2003	Kitt Peak	Spacewatch	·	1.4 km	MPC · JPL
721236	2003 JR	—	May 1, 2003	Kitt Peak	Spacewatch	MAS	630 m	MPC · JPL
721237	2003 JO_{19}	—	February 27, 2012	Haleakala	Pan-STARRS 1	·	1.7 km	MPC · JPL
721238	2003 KO	—	May 22, 2003	Wrightwood	J. W. Young	·	1.8 km	MPC · JPL
721239	2003 KK_{1}	—	May 22, 2003	Kitt Peak	Spacewatch	·	1.8 km	MPC · JPL
721240	2003 KJ_{3}	—	May 22, 2003	Kitt Peak	Spacewatch	H	410 m	MPC · JPL
721241	2003 KW_{11}	—	May 26, 2003	Kitt Peak	Spacewatch	·	3.6 km	MPC · JPL
721242	2003 KT_{14}	—	May 25, 2003	Kitt Peak	Spacewatch	·	3.4 km	MPC · JPL
721243	2003 KM_{20}	—	October 20, 1995	Kitt Peak	Spacewatch	·	1.5 km	MPC · JPL
721244	2003 KQ_{37}	—	February 16, 2015	Haleakala	Pan-STARRS 1	·	1.2 km	MPC · JPL
721245	2003 KY_{37}	—	October 28, 2013	Kitt Peak	Spacewatch	(5)	830 m	MPC · JPL
721246	2003 KZ_{39}	—	May 3, 2008	Mount Lemmon	Mount Lemmon Survey	·	2.0 km	MPC · JPL
721247	2003 NV_{13}	—	May 10, 2010	WISE	WISE	·	910 m	MPC · JPL
721248	2003 NX_{13}	—	July 5, 2003	Kitt Peak	Spacewatch	·	1.0 km	MPC · JPL
721249	2003 NE_{14}	—	April 25, 2015	Haleakala	Pan-STARRS 1	·	1.2 km	MPC · JPL
721250	2003 NJ_{14}	—	September 30, 2009	Mount Lemmon	Mount Lemmon Survey	·	2.3 km	MPC · JPL
721251	2003 NK_{15}	—	July 8, 2003	Palomar	NEAT	·	770 m	MPC · JPL
721252	2003 OH_{3}	—	July 22, 2003	Haleakala	NEAT	·	1.4 km	MPC · JPL
721253	2003 OZ_{14}	—	July 22, 2003	Palomar	NEAT	·	1.3 km	MPC · JPL
721254	2003 OJ_{17}	—	July 29, 2003	Campo Imperatore	CINEOS	(5)	1.2 km	MPC · JPL
721255	2003 OV_{34}	—	May 20, 2015	Haleakala	Pan-STARRS 1	·	1.3 km	MPC · JPL
721256	2003 OS_{35}	—	July 5, 2003	Kitt Peak	Spacewatch	·	650 m	MPC · JPL
721257	2003 PN	—	August 2, 2003	Haleakala	NEAT	·	1.2 km	MPC · JPL
721258	2003 PM_{13}	—	August 4, 2003	Kitt Peak	Spacewatch	(2076)	580 m	MPC · JPL
721259	2003 QR	—	August 18, 2003	Campo Imperatore	CINEOS	·	640 m	MPC · JPL
721260	2003 QF_{31}	—	August 23, 2003	Palomar	NEAT	·	1.5 km	MPC · JPL
721261	2003 QW_{34}	—	August 22, 2003	Palomar	NEAT	·	1.8 km	MPC · JPL
721262	2003 QM_{58}	—	August 30, 1995	La Silla	C.-I. Lagerkvist	·	1.0 km	MPC · JPL
721263	2003 QA_{82}	—	August 23, 2003	Palomar	NEAT	EUP	4.7 km	MPC · JPL
721264	2003 QJ_{92}	—	August 30, 2003	Kitt Peak	Spacewatch	·	980 m	MPC · JPL
721265	2003 QU_{93}	—	August 4, 2003	Socorro	LINEAR	PHO	1.1 km	MPC · JPL
721266	2003 QP_{122}	—	May 25, 2015	Mount Lemmon	Mount Lemmon Survey	·	1.0 km	MPC · JPL
721267	2003 QH_{123}	—	January 16, 2018	Haleakala	Pan-STARRS 1	·	940 m	MPC · JPL
721268	2003 RH_{10}	—	September 1, 2003	Socorro	LINEAR	·	1.6 km	MPC · JPL
721269	2003 RS_{11}	—	September 16, 2003	Kitt Peak	Spacewatch	WIT	920 m	MPC · JPL
721270	2003 RQ_{13}	—	September 15, 2003	Palomar	NEAT	JUN	1.1 km	MPC · JPL
721271	2003 RE_{15}	—	September 15, 2003	Palomar	NEAT	·	1.3 km	MPC · JPL
721272	2003 SB_{4}	—	September 16, 2003	Kitt Peak	Spacewatch	·	1.0 km	MPC · JPL
721273	2003 SV_{5}	—	September 16, 2003	Kitt Peak	Spacewatch	EUN	1 km	MPC · JPL
721274	2003 SA_{18}	—	August 20, 2003	Palomar	NEAT	·	2.3 km	MPC · JPL
721275	2003 SF_{29}	—	September 18, 2003	Palomar	NEAT	V	480 m	MPC · JPL
721276	2003 SH_{29}	—	September 18, 2003	Palomar	NEAT	TIR	3.5 km	MPC · JPL
721277	2003 SP_{33}	—	September 16, 2003	Kitt Peak	Spacewatch	·	1.3 km	MPC · JPL
721278	2003 SW_{76}	—	August 4, 2003	Kitt Peak	Spacewatch	·	2.1 km	MPC · JPL
721279	2003 SZ_{78}	—	September 19, 2003	Kitt Peak	Spacewatch	KON	3.3 km	MPC · JPL
721280	2003 SP_{93}	—	September 18, 2003	Palomar	NEAT	·	1.8 km	MPC · JPL
721281	2003 SD_{126}	—	September 19, 2003	Mount Graham	Ryan, W.	·	2.5 km	MPC · JPL
721282	2003 SE_{127}	—	September 21, 2003	Kitt Peak	Spacewatch	THM	2.0 km	MPC · JPL
721283	2003 SV_{130}	—	September 20, 2003	Kitt Peak	Spacewatch	HNS	990 m	MPC · JPL
721284	2003 SA_{151}	—	August 29, 2003	Haleakala	NEAT	·	820 m	MPC · JPL
721285	2003 SS_{158}	—	August 23, 2003	Palomar	NEAT	·	870 m	MPC · JPL
721286	2003 SC_{178}	—	September 19, 2003	Palomar	NEAT	·	3.4 km	MPC · JPL
721287	2003 SA_{188}	—	September 19, 2003	Palomar	NEAT	·	630 m	MPC · JPL
721288	2003 SL_{200}	—	September 25, 2003	Palomar	NEAT	EUN	1.4 km	MPC · JPL
721289	2003 SV_{208}	—	August 19, 2003	Wise	Polishook, D.	GEF	1.4 km	MPC · JPL
721290	2003 SP_{228}	—	September 18, 2003	Palomar	NEAT	·	1.3 km	MPC · JPL
721291	2003 SO_{233}	—	September 25, 2003	Palomar	NEAT	EOS	2.1 km	MPC · JPL
721292	2003 SB_{246}	—	September 18, 2003	Kitt Peak	Spacewatch	BRG	1.4 km	MPC · JPL
721293	2003 SO_{257}	—	September 18, 2003	Palomar	NEAT	·	590 m	MPC · JPL
721294	2003 SO_{265}	—	September 29, 2003	Kitt Peak	Spacewatch	PAD	1.7 km	MPC · JPL
721295	2003 SM_{267}	—	September 29, 2003	Kitt Peak	Spacewatch	·	1.6 km	MPC · JPL
721296	2003 SQ_{267}	—	September 29, 2003	Kitt Peak	Spacewatch	·	1.8 km	MPC · JPL
721297	2003 SU_{268}	—	September 30, 2003	Kitt Peak	Spacewatch	·	2.0 km	MPC · JPL
721298	2003 SE_{277}	—	September 19, 2003	Palomar	NEAT	·	1.8 km	MPC · JPL
721299	2003 SF_{279}	—	September 30, 2003	Kitt Peak	Spacewatch	·	1.9 km	MPC · JPL
721300	2003 SM_{302}	—	September 18, 2003	Palomar	NEAT	·	1.3 km	MPC · JPL

== 721301–721400 ==
back to top

Designation			Discovery			Properties		Ref
Permanent	Provisional	Named after	Date	Site	Discoverer(s)	Category	Diam.	Ref
721301	2003 ST_{312}	—	August 22, 2003	Palomar	NEAT	·	780 m	MPC · JPL
721302	2003 SP_{323}	—	September 16, 2003	Kitt Peak	Spacewatch	EOS	1.6 km	MPC · JPL
721303	2003 ST_{327}	—	September 19, 2003	Palomar	NEAT	EOS	1.9 km	MPC · JPL
721304	2003 SU_{329}	—	September 23, 2003	Palomar	NEAT	·	720 m	MPC · JPL
721305	2003 SP_{331}	—	September 27, 2003	Kitt Peak	Spacewatch	·	2.0 km	MPC · JPL
721306	2003 SO_{334}	—	September 29, 2003	Kitt Peak	Spacewatch	EOS	1.5 km	MPC · JPL
721307	2003 SQ_{334}	—	September 26, 2003	Apache Point	SDSS Collaboration	·	2.8 km	MPC · JPL
721308	2003 SR_{334}	—	September 29, 2003	Kitt Peak	Spacewatch	·	830 m	MPC · JPL
721309	2003 SU_{335}	—	October 18, 2003	Anderson Mesa	LONEOS	·	1.3 km	MPC · JPL
721310	2003 SY_{336}	—	September 27, 2003	Apache Point	SDSS Collaboration	·	1.8 km	MPC · JPL
721311	2003 SF_{337}	—	September 30, 2003	Kitt Peak	Spacewatch	·	1.2 km	MPC · JPL
721312	2003 SQ_{338}	—	October 2, 2003	Kitt Peak	Spacewatch	EOS	1.5 km	MPC · JPL
721313	2003 SR_{339}	—	September 26, 2003	Apache Point	SDSS Collaboration	EOS	1.7 km	MPC · JPL
721314	2003 SX_{339}	—	October 23, 2003	Kitt Peak	Spacewatch	H	410 m	MPC · JPL
721315	2003 SK_{340}	—	October 20, 2003	Kitt Peak	Spacewatch	·	990 m	MPC · JPL
721316	2003 SL_{340}	—	September 16, 2003	Kitt Peak	Spacewatch	·	3.5 km	MPC · JPL
721317	2003 SF_{343}	—	September 17, 2003	Kitt Peak	Spacewatch	·	1.3 km	MPC · JPL
721318	2003 SH_{344}	—	September 17, 2003	Kitt Peak	Spacewatch	EOS	3.4 km	MPC · JPL
721319	2003 SL_{344}	—	September 17, 2003	Kitt Peak	Spacewatch	·	1.3 km	MPC · JPL
721320	2003 SG_{349}	—	September 18, 2003	Kitt Peak	Spacewatch	·	1.0 km	MPC · JPL
721321	2003 SW_{349}	—	September 18, 2003	Kitt Peak	Spacewatch	·	2.3 km	MPC · JPL
721322	2003 SR_{358}	—	September 21, 2003	Kitt Peak	Spacewatch	·	2.8 km	MPC · JPL
721323	2003 SR_{359}	—	September 18, 2003	Palomar	NEAT	·	2.6 km	MPC · JPL
721324	2003 SC_{365}	—	September 26, 2003	Apache Point	SDSS Collaboration	·	1.9 km	MPC · JPL
721325	2003 SJ_{365}	—	September 26, 2003	Apache Point	SDSS Collaboration	·	1.3 km	MPC · JPL
721326	2003 SM_{365}	—	September 26, 2003	Apache Point	SDSS Collaboration	·	1.1 km	MPC · JPL
721327	2003 SB_{367}	—	September 26, 2003	Apache Point	SDSS Collaboration	·	2.2 km	MPC · JPL
721328	2003 SD_{368}	—	September 26, 2003	Apache Point	SDSS Collaboration	·	580 m	MPC · JPL
721329	2003 SY_{368}	—	September 26, 2003	Apache Point	SDSS Collaboration	·	1.5 km	MPC · JPL
721330	2003 SM_{370}	—	September 26, 2003	Apache Point	SDSS Collaboration	·	1.3 km	MPC · JPL
721331	2003 SC_{371}	—	September 26, 2003	Apache Point	SDSS Collaboration	·	1.7 km	MPC · JPL
721332	2003 SL_{371}	—	September 26, 2003	Apache Point	SDSS Collaboration	·	1.2 km	MPC · JPL
721333	2003 SA_{373}	—	September 29, 2003	Kitt Peak	Spacewatch	KOR	1.1 km	MPC · JPL
721334	2003 SN_{373}	—	September 26, 2003	Apache Point	SDSS Collaboration	·	2.5 km	MPC · JPL
721335	2003 SG_{378}	—	September 26, 2003	Apache Point	SDSS Collaboration	·	1.3 km	MPC · JPL
721336	2003 SM_{378}	—	September 26, 2003	Apache Point	SDSS Collaboration	·	1.4 km	MPC · JPL
721337	2003 SN_{381}	—	September 29, 2003	Kitt Peak	Spacewatch	·	990 m	MPC · JPL
721338	2003 SU_{381}	—	September 26, 2003	Apache Point	SDSS Collaboration	NYS	1.1 km	MPC · JPL
721339	2003 SD_{382}	—	September 30, 2003	Kitt Peak	Spacewatch	·	1.6 km	MPC · JPL
721340	2003 SE_{383}	—	September 30, 2003	Kitt Peak	Spacewatch	·	2.0 km	MPC · JPL
721341	2003 SH_{384}	—	September 30, 2003	Kitt Peak	Spacewatch	·	1.5 km	MPC · JPL
721342	2003 SZ_{386}	—	October 2, 2003	Kitt Peak	Spacewatch	3:2	4.4 km	MPC · JPL
721343	2003 SQ_{387}	—	October 2, 2003	Kitt Peak	Spacewatch	EOS	1.4 km	MPC · JPL
721344	2003 SG_{388}	—	October 2, 2003	Kitt Peak	Spacewatch	·	1.7 km	MPC · JPL
721345	2003 SU_{389}	—	September 26, 2003	Apache Point	SDSS Collaboration	·	670 m	MPC · JPL
721346	2003 SO_{390}	—	September 26, 2003	Apache Point	SDSS Collaboration	·	2.6 km	MPC · JPL
721347	2003 SU_{390}	—	September 26, 2003	Apache Point	SDSS Collaboration	·	900 m	MPC · JPL
721348	2003 SW_{390}	—	September 26, 2003	Apache Point	SDSS Collaboration	·	2.9 km	MPC · JPL
721349	2003 SH_{391}	—	September 26, 2003	Apache Point	SDSS Collaboration	·	2.7 km	MPC · JPL
721350	2003 SP_{391}	—	September 26, 2003	Apache Point	SDSS Collaboration	·	2.3 km	MPC · JPL
721351	2003 SN_{393}	—	September 26, 2003	Apache Point	SDSS Collaboration	·	3.7 km	MPC · JPL
721352	2003 SO_{393}	—	September 26, 2003	Apache Point	SDSS Collaboration	(5)	1.3 km	MPC · JPL
721353	2003 SH_{394}	—	September 26, 2003	Apache Point	SDSS Collaboration	·	530 m	MPC · JPL
721354	2003 SO_{394}	—	September 26, 2003	Apache Point	SDSS Collaboration	·	590 m	MPC · JPL
721355	2003 SS_{395}	—	September 26, 2003	Apache Point	SDSS Collaboration	·	2.7 km	MPC · JPL
721356	2003 SO_{397}	—	September 26, 2003	Apache Point	SDSS Collaboration	·	2.9 km	MPC · JPL
721357	2003 SY_{397}	—	September 26, 2003	Apache Point	SDSS Collaboration	URS	2.4 km	MPC · JPL
721358	2003 SB_{399}	—	September 26, 2003	Apache Point	SDSS Collaboration	·	1.7 km	MPC · JPL
721359	2003 SL_{399}	—	September 26, 2003	Apache Point	SDSS Collaboration	·	1.2 km	MPC · JPL
721360	2003 SA_{400}	—	September 26, 2003	Apache Point	SDSS Collaboration	·	1.5 km	MPC · JPL
721361	2003 SM_{400}	—	January 14, 1996	Kitt Peak	Spacewatch	·	1.7 km	MPC · JPL
721362	2003 SX_{400}	—	September 26, 2003	Apache Point	SDSS Collaboration	·	900 m	MPC · JPL
721363	2003 SD_{401}	—	September 26, 2003	Apache Point	SDSS Collaboration	·	1.4 km	MPC · JPL
721364	2003 SE_{401}	—	September 26, 2003	Apache Point	SDSS Collaboration	·	1.4 km	MPC · JPL
721365	2003 SJ_{403}	—	September 16, 2003	Kitt Peak	Spacewatch	·	620 m	MPC · JPL
721366	2003 SD_{404}	—	September 27, 2003	Apache Point	SDSS Collaboration	·	2.8 km	MPC · JPL
721367	2003 SR_{405}	—	September 27, 2003	Apache Point	SDSS Collaboration	·	1.6 km	MPC · JPL
721368	2003 SO_{406}	—	September 27, 2003	Apache Point	SDSS Collaboration	EOS	1.6 km	MPC · JPL
721369	2003 SY_{406}	—	September 27, 2003	Apache Point	SDSS Collaboration	T_{j} (2.97) · 3:2	4.4 km	MPC · JPL
721370	2003 SG_{407}	—	September 27, 2003	Apache Point	SDSS Collaboration	·	2.5 km	MPC · JPL
721371	2003 SZ_{407}	—	September 27, 2003	Apache Point	SDSS Collaboration	·	2.0 km	MPC · JPL
721372	2003 SE_{408}	—	September 27, 2003	Apache Point	SDSS Collaboration	·	2.4 km	MPC · JPL
721373	2003 SY_{409}	—	September 28, 2003	Kitt Peak	Spacewatch	·	2.2 km	MPC · JPL
721374	2003 ST_{410}	—	September 28, 2003	Apache Point	SDSS Collaboration	·	1.3 km	MPC · JPL
721375	2003 SK_{411}	—	September 17, 2003	Kitt Peak	Spacewatch	·	2.2 km	MPC · JPL
721376	2003 SL_{413}	—	September 28, 2003	Apache Point	SDSS Collaboration	KOR	950 m	MPC · JPL
721377	2003 SM_{416}	—	April 13, 2002	Palomar	NEAT	·	2.3 km	MPC · JPL
721378	2003 SX_{416}	—	September 28, 2003	Apache Point	SDSS Collaboration	·	2.5 km	MPC · JPL
721379	2003 SC_{418}	—	September 28, 2003	Apache Point	SDSS Collaboration	·	1.5 km	MPC · JPL
721380	2003 SH_{418}	—	May 14, 2002	Kitt Peak	Spacewatch	·	1.6 km	MPC · JPL
721381	2003 SY_{418}	—	September 28, 2003	Apache Point	SDSS	·	620 m	MPC · JPL
721382	2003 SD_{419}	—	September 28, 2003	Apache Point	SDSS	·	1.7 km	MPC · JPL
721383	2003 SU_{419}	—	September 28, 2003	Apache Point	SDSS	BRG	1.3 km	MPC · JPL
721384	2003 SO_{420}	—	September 30, 2003	Kitt Peak	Spacewatch	·	2.3 km	MPC · JPL
721385	2003 SM_{422}	—	September 26, 2003	Apache Point	SDSS Collaboration	·	1.4 km	MPC · JPL
721386	2003 SD_{428}	—	September 16, 2003	Kitt Peak	Spacewatch	MAR	860 m	MPC · JPL
721387	2003 SQ_{435}	—	September 22, 2003	Palomar	NEAT	·	1.1 km	MPC · JPL
721388	2003 SM_{439}	—	December 2, 2005	Kitt Peak	Wasserman, L. H., Millis, R. L.	EOS	1.7 km	MPC · JPL
721389	2003 SS_{439}	—	September 16, 2003	Kitt Peak	Spacewatch	·	790 m	MPC · JPL
721390	2003 SW_{439}	—	September 17, 2003	Kitt Peak	Spacewatch	·	760 m	MPC · JPL
721391	2003 SY_{440}	—	December 22, 2008	Kitt Peak	Spacewatch	·	1.0 km	MPC · JPL
721392	2003 SA_{441}	—	May 16, 2012	Kitt Peak	Spacewatch	·	1.6 km	MPC · JPL
721393	2003 SH_{441}	—	October 23, 2003	Kitt Peak	Spacewatch	V	400 m	MPC · JPL
721394	2003 SE_{442}	—	October 23, 2003	Kitt Peak	Spacewatch	·	2.5 km	MPC · JPL
721395	2003 SF_{442}	—	April 5, 2014	Haleakala	Pan-STARRS 1	·	1.0 km	MPC · JPL
721396	2003 SH_{442}	—	September 17, 2003	Kitt Peak	Spacewatch	·	1.5 km	MPC · JPL
721397	2003 SR_{442}	—	August 10, 2016	Haleakala	Pan-STARRS 1	·	460 m	MPC · JPL
721398	2003 SL_{443}	—	September 20, 2003	Kitt Peak	Spacewatch	EOS	1.7 km	MPC · JPL
721399	2003 SY_{443}	—	September 17, 2003	Kitt Peak	Spacewatch	·	720 m	MPC · JPL
721400	2003 SN_{444}	—	September 19, 2003	Kitt Peak	Spacewatch	·	1.4 km	MPC · JPL

== 721401–721500 ==
back to top

Designation			Discovery			Properties		Ref
Permanent	Provisional	Named after	Date	Site	Discoverer(s)	Category	Diam.	Ref
721401	2003 SX_{445}	—	January 30, 2010	WISE	WISE	·	2.0 km	MPC · JPL
721402	2003 SA_{447}	—	September 19, 2003	Kitt Peak	Spacewatch	·	670 m	MPC · JPL
721403	2003 SD_{447}	—	September 3, 2013	Haleakala	Pan-STARRS 1	·	1.5 km	MPC · JPL
721404	2003 SG_{447}	—	September 28, 2003	Kitt Peak	Spacewatch	HOF	1.8 km	MPC · JPL
721405	2003 SN_{448}	—	April 13, 2013	Haleakala	Pan-STARRS 1	·	850 m	MPC · JPL
721406	2003 SU_{449}	—	August 2, 2008	Siding Spring	SSS	·	2.6 km	MPC · JPL
721407	2003 SU_{450}	—	January 8, 2011	Mount Lemmon	Mount Lemmon Survey	EOS	1.4 km	MPC · JPL
721408	2003 SW_{450}	—	April 15, 2012	Haleakala	Pan-STARRS 1	·	1.9 km	MPC · JPL
721409	2003 SY_{450}	—	September 18, 2003	Kitt Peak	Spacewatch	·	1.3 km	MPC · JPL
721410	2003 SE_{451}	—	June 22, 2010	WISE	WISE	·	1.5 km	MPC · JPL
721411	2003 SF_{451}	—	October 26, 2014	Mount Lemmon	Mount Lemmon Survey	EOS	1.6 km	MPC · JPL
721412	2003 SJ_{451}	—	September 30, 2003	Kitt Peak	Spacewatch	·	2.1 km	MPC · JPL
721413	2003 SQ_{451}	—	September 19, 2003	Kitt Peak	Spacewatch	·	1.1 km	MPC · JPL
721414	2003 SC_{452}	—	February 16, 2010	WISE	WISE	·	2.3 km	MPC · JPL
721415	2003 SA_{453}	—	May 18, 2018	Mount Lemmon	Mount Lemmon Survey	·	1.4 km	MPC · JPL
721416	2003 SP_{454}	—	January 26, 2014	Haleakala	Pan-STARRS 1	·	1.4 km	MPC · JPL
721417	2003 SX_{454}	—	July 28, 2011	Haleakala	Pan-STARRS 1	(5)	1.0 km	MPC · JPL
721418	2003 SO_{455}	—	September 25, 2014	Kitt Peak	Spacewatch	·	1.7 km	MPC · JPL
721419	2003 SH_{457}	—	September 21, 2003	Kitt Peak	Spacewatch	·	1.4 km	MPC · JPL
721420	2003 SJ_{457}	—	April 7, 2007	Mount Lemmon	Mount Lemmon Survey	THM	1.6 km	MPC · JPL
721421	2003 SU_{457}	—	October 25, 2009	Catalina	CSS	·	2.7 km	MPC · JPL
721422	2003 SA_{458}	—	September 18, 2003	Kitt Peak	Spacewatch	·	1.6 km	MPC · JPL
721423	2003 SJ_{458}	—	August 28, 2014	Haleakala	Pan-STARRS 1	·	2.3 km	MPC · JPL
721424	2003 SP_{458}	—	September 20, 2003	Kitt Peak	Spacewatch	·	760 m	MPC · JPL
721425	2003 SU_{459}	—	October 12, 2016	Haleakala	Pan-STARRS 1	·	960 m	MPC · JPL
721426	2003 SW_{460}	—	September 30, 2003	Apache Point	SDSS Collaboration	EOS	1.6 km	MPC · JPL
721427	2003 SY_{460}	—	September 18, 2003	Kitt Peak	Spacewatch	·	2.0 km	MPC · JPL
721428	2003 SS_{461}	—	October 12, 2010	Mount Lemmon	Mount Lemmon Survey	·	530 m	MPC · JPL
721429	2003 SJ_{464}	—	September 18, 2003	Kitt Peak	Spacewatch	·	2.4 km	MPC · JPL
721430	2003 SP_{464}	—	September 28, 2003	Kitt Peak	Spacewatch	·	830 m	MPC · JPL
721431	2003 SW_{464}	—	September 28, 2003	Kitt Peak	Spacewatch	·	1.2 km	MPC · JPL
721432	2003 SB_{465}	—	September 28, 2003	Kitt Peak	Spacewatch	·	1.2 km	MPC · JPL
721433	2003 SU_{467}	—	September 27, 2003	Kitt Peak	Spacewatch	·	1.2 km	MPC · JPL
721434	2003 SN_{468}	—	September 29, 2003	Kitt Peak	Spacewatch	·	2.8 km	MPC · JPL
721435	2003 SA_{469}	—	September 18, 2003	Kitt Peak	Spacewatch	MAR	890 m	MPC · JPL
721436	2003 SE_{469}	—	September 19, 2003	Anderson Mesa	LONEOS	LIX	3.3 km	MPC · JPL
721437	2003 SJ_{469}	—	September 28, 2003	Kitt Peak	Spacewatch	(5)	930 m	MPC · JPL
721438	2003 SG_{470}	—	September 30, 2003	Kitt Peak	Spacewatch	·	920 m	MPC · JPL
721439	2003 SO_{473}	—	September 30, 2003	Apache Point	SDSS Collaboration	EUN	1.0 km	MPC · JPL
721440	2003 TX_{3}	—	August 25, 2003	Palomar	NEAT	·	3.2 km	MPC · JPL
721441	2003 TT_{5}	—	September 18, 2003	Kitt Peak	Spacewatch	·	2.4 km	MPC · JPL
721442	2003 TN_{23}	—	September 20, 2003	Palomar	NEAT	·	1.5 km	MPC · JPL
721443	2003 TD_{25}	—	October 1, 2003	Kitt Peak	Spacewatch	·	2.4 km	MPC · JPL
721444	2003 TX_{25}	—	October 1, 2003	Kitt Peak	Spacewatch	·	1.6 km	MPC · JPL
721445	2003 TC_{32}	—	October 1, 2003	Kitt Peak	Spacewatch	·	710 m	MPC · JPL
721446	2003 TY_{33}	—	October 1, 2003	Kitt Peak	Spacewatch	·	1.8 km	MPC · JPL
721447	2003 TE_{34}	—	October 1, 2003	Kitt Peak	Spacewatch	·	940 m	MPC · JPL
721448	2003 TW_{43}	—	October 2, 2003	Kitt Peak	Spacewatch	LUT	3.8 km	MPC · JPL
721449	2003 TB_{48}	—	October 3, 2003	Kitt Peak	Spacewatch	·	1.2 km	MPC · JPL
721450	2003 TO_{50}	—	September 20, 2003	Kitt Peak	Spacewatch	·	1.1 km	MPC · JPL
721451	2003 TV_{52}	—	September 28, 2003	Anderson Mesa	LONEOS	·	980 m	MPC · JPL
721452	2003 TF_{55}	—	October 5, 2003	Kitt Peak	Spacewatch	·	2.6 km	MPC · JPL
721453	2003 TK_{55}	—	October 5, 2003	Kitt Peak	Spacewatch	·	690 m	MPC · JPL
721454	2003 TX_{55}	—	October 5, 2003	Kitt Peak	Spacewatch	·	1.6 km	MPC · JPL
721455	2003 TQ_{60}	—	October 2, 2003	Kitt Peak	Spacewatch	·	580 m	MPC · JPL
721456	2003 TV_{60}	—	October 4, 2003	Kitt Peak	Spacewatch	·	3.7 km	MPC · JPL
721457	2003 TX_{60}	—	October 5, 2003	Kitt Peak	Spacewatch	EUN	1.2 km	MPC · JPL
721458	2003 TC_{61}	—	March 6, 2016	Haleakala	Pan-STARRS 1	EOS	1.5 km	MPC · JPL
721459	2003 TN_{61}	—	December 21, 2008	Catalina	CSS	·	1.9 km	MPC · JPL
721460	2003 TY_{62}	—	September 7, 2011	Kitt Peak	Spacewatch	3:2	5.2 km	MPC · JPL
721461	2003 TO_{63}	—	October 1, 2003	Kitt Peak	Spacewatch	·	1.1 km	MPC · JPL
721462	2003 TQ_{63}	—	June 14, 2010	WISE	WISE	·	1.6 km	MPC · JPL
721463	2003 TB_{64}	—	January 20, 2010	WISE	WISE	·	2.5 km	MPC · JPL
721464	2003 TP_{64}	—	October 3, 2003	Kitt Peak	Spacewatch	·	1.6 km	MPC · JPL
721465	2003 TJ_{65}	—	March 8, 2005	Mount Lemmon	Mount Lemmon Survey	·	1.7 km	MPC · JPL
721466	2003 UY_{2}	—	October 16, 2003	Kitt Peak	Spacewatch	LIX	3.1 km	MPC · JPL
721467	2003 UU_{6}	—	October 18, 2003	Palomar	NEAT	·	1.5 km	MPC · JPL
721468	2003 UJ_{21}	—	October 18, 2003	Kitt Peak	Spacewatch	·	1.8 km	MPC · JPL
721469	2003 UY_{29}	—	October 25, 2003	Andrushivka	Andrushivka	·	2.8 km	MPC · JPL
721470	2003 UB_{34}	—	September 29, 2003	Kitt Peak	Spacewatch	·	2.0 km	MPC · JPL
721471	2003 UG_{34}	—	October 17, 2003	Kitt Peak	Spacewatch	HOF	2.7 km	MPC · JPL
721472	2003 UA_{51}	—	October 18, 2003	Palomar	NEAT	·	3.1 km	MPC · JPL
721473	2003 UD_{51}	—	October 18, 2003	Palomar	NEAT	·	2.9 km	MPC · JPL
721474	2003 UT_{57}	—	September 21, 2003	Anderson Mesa	LONEOS	·	4.7 km	MPC · JPL
721475	2003 UK_{79}	—	September 20, 2003	Palomar	NEAT	ADE	3.8 km	MPC · JPL
721476	2003 UC_{87}	—	October 19, 2003	Kitt Peak	Spacewatch	EUN	1.5 km	MPC · JPL
721477	2003 UE_{89}	—	September 18, 2003	Kitt Peak	Spacewatch	·	1.1 km	MPC · JPL
721478	2003 UX_{89}	—	October 20, 2003	Palomar	NEAT	·	2.7 km	MPC · JPL
721479	2003 UL_{111}	—	September 29, 2003	Socorro	LINEAR	·	2.8 km	MPC · JPL
721480	2003 UT_{124}	—	October 20, 2003	Kitt Peak	Spacewatch	V	460 m	MPC · JPL
721481	2003 UF_{127}	—	October 2, 2003	Kitt Peak	Spacewatch	THM	1.8 km	MPC · JPL
721482	2003 UT_{136}	—	September 26, 2003	Socorro	LINEAR	·	1.8 km	MPC · JPL
721483	2003 UX_{155}	—	October 20, 2003	Kitt Peak	Spacewatch	EOS	1.4 km	MPC · JPL
721484	2003 UY_{155}	—	October 20, 2003	Kitt Peak	Spacewatch	·	2.3 km	MPC · JPL
721485	2003 UJ_{160}	—	October 2, 2003	Kitt Peak	Spacewatch	·	1.8 km	MPC · JPL
721486	2003 UV_{170}	—	October 19, 2003	Kitt Peak	Spacewatch	·	1.2 km	MPC · JPL
721487	2003 UE_{191}	—	October 23, 2003	Kitt Peak	Spacewatch	·	2.7 km	MPC · JPL
721488	2003 UO_{192}	—	October 23, 2003	Kitt Peak	Spacewatch	·	1.2 km	MPC · JPL
721489	2003 UD_{199}	—	October 21, 2003	Socorro	LINEAR	·	1.6 km	MPC · JPL
721490	2003 UT_{231}	—	October 16, 2003	Kitt Peak	Spacewatch	EOS	1.9 km	MPC · JPL
721491	2003 US_{237}	—	October 23, 2003	Kitt Peak	Spacewatch	·	2.3 km	MPC · JPL
721492	2003 UQ_{281}	—	September 22, 2003	Palomar	NEAT	·	2.6 km	MPC · JPL
721493	2003 UX_{287}	—	October 22, 2003	Kitt Peak	Deep Ecliptic Survey	HNS	860 m	MPC · JPL
721494	2003 UF_{296}	—	October 16, 2003	Kitt Peak	Spacewatch	·	1.1 km	MPC · JPL
721495	2003 UH_{303}	—	September 19, 2003	Palomar	NEAT	DOR	2.3 km	MPC · JPL
721496	2003 UW_{315}	—	October 20, 2003	Kitt Peak	Spacewatch	·	3.7 km	MPC · JPL
721497	2003 UD_{320}	—	October 21, 2003	Palomar	NEAT	·	740 m	MPC · JPL
721498	2003 UK_{321}	—	October 16, 2003	Kitt Peak	Spacewatch	·	2.5 km	MPC · JPL
721499	2003 UV_{324}	—	July 26, 2003	Palomar	NEAT	·	3.4 km	MPC · JPL
721500	2003 UL_{326}	—	October 17, 2003	Apache Point	SDSS Collaboration	·	3.5 km	MPC · JPL

== 721501–721600 ==
back to top

Designation			Discovery			Properties		Ref
Permanent	Provisional	Named after	Date	Site	Discoverer(s)	Category	Diam.	Ref
721501	2003 UB_{327}	—	September 30, 2003	Kitt Peak	Spacewatch	·	1.8 km	MPC · JPL
721502	2003 UY_{328}	—	September 20, 2003	Kitt Peak	Spacewatch	·	2.0 km	MPC · JPL
721503	2003 UF_{329}	—	September 17, 2003	Kitt Peak	Spacewatch	EOS	1.4 km	MPC · JPL
721504	2003 UB_{331}	—	September 4, 2003	Kitt Peak	Spacewatch	·	2.6 km	MPC · JPL
721505	2003 UV_{334}	—	September 18, 2003	Kitt Peak	Spacewatch	WIT	880 m	MPC · JPL
721506	2003 UZ_{335}	—	September 18, 2003	Kitt Peak	Spacewatch	MRX	730 m	MPC · JPL
721507	2003 US_{341}	—	July 23, 2003	Palomar	NEAT	EOS	4.9 km	MPC · JPL
721508	2003 UC_{344}	—	October 19, 2003	Kitt Peak	Spacewatch	HYG	2.5 km	MPC · JPL
721509	2003 UP_{346}	—	September 18, 2003	Kitt Peak	Spacewatch	·	2.6 km	MPC · JPL
721510	2003 UF_{347}	—	October 19, 2003	Apache Point	SDSS Collaboration	·	1.6 km	MPC · JPL
721511	2003 UO_{348}	—	October 19, 2003	Apache Point	SDSS	V	570 m	MPC · JPL
721512	2003 UJ_{350}	—	October 19, 2003	Apache Point	SDSS Collaboration	·	1.9 km	MPC · JPL
721513	2003 UP_{353}	—	October 19, 2003	Apache Point	SDSS	·	1.5 km	MPC · JPL
721514	2003 UB_{355}	—	October 23, 2003	Kitt Peak	Spacewatch	·	1.8 km	MPC · JPL
721515	2003 UX_{357}	—	October 19, 2003	Kitt Peak	Spacewatch	H	380 m	MPC · JPL
721516	2003 UL_{358}	—	October 19, 2003	Kitt Peak	Spacewatch	·	2.3 km	MPC · JPL
721517	2003 UX_{359}	—	October 19, 2003	Kitt Peak	Spacewatch	·	490 m	MPC · JPL
721518	2003 US_{363}	—	October 20, 2003	Kitt Peak	Spacewatch	·	1.9 km	MPC · JPL
721519	2003 UK_{364}	—	October 20, 2003	Kitt Peak	Spacewatch	·	1.3 km	MPC · JPL
721520	2003 UZ_{364}	—	October 20, 2003	Kitt Peak	Spacewatch	·	3.0 km	MPC · JPL
721521	2003 UL_{365}	—	October 20, 2003	Kitt Peak	Spacewatch	·	1.4 km	MPC · JPL
721522	2003 UG_{366}	—	October 20, 2003	Kitt Peak	Spacewatch	·	2.5 km	MPC · JPL
721523	2003 UD_{368}	—	October 21, 2003	Kitt Peak	Spacewatch	·	630 m	MPC · JPL
721524	2003 UF_{368}	—	March 4, 2005	Mount Lemmon	Mount Lemmon Survey	·	2.1 km	MPC · JPL
721525	2003 UA_{370}	—	October 21, 2003	Kitt Peak	Spacewatch	·	4.7 km	MPC · JPL
721526	2003 UN_{373}	—	October 22, 2003	Apache Point	SDSS	·	2.6 km	MPC · JPL
721527	2003 UT_{373}	—	September 18, 2003	Kitt Peak	Spacewatch	V	500 m	MPC · JPL
721528	2003 UA_{374}	—	October 22, 2003	Apache Point	SDSS Collaboration	·	1.0 km	MPC · JPL
721529	2003 UL_{375}	—	September 30, 2003	Kitt Peak	Spacewatch	·	580 m	MPC · JPL
721530	2003 UY_{376}	—	September 18, 2003	Kitt Peak	Spacewatch	·	2.5 km	MPC · JPL
721531	2003 UH_{377}	—	October 22, 2003	Apache Point	SDSS Collaboration	·	1.8 km	MPC · JPL
721532	2003 UX_{377}	—	September 18, 2003	Kitt Peak	Spacewatch	·	2.5 km	MPC · JPL
721533	2003 UD_{378}	—	September 18, 2003	Kitt Peak	Spacewatch	·	2.1 km	MPC · JPL
721534	2003 UA_{379}	—	October 20, 2003	Kitt Peak	Spacewatch	·	2.1 km	MPC · JPL
721535	2003 US_{380}	—	October 22, 2003	Apache Point	SDSS Collaboration	·	1.9 km	MPC · JPL
721536	2003 UM_{381}	—	September 21, 2003	Palomar	NEAT	ERI	1.1 km	MPC · JPL
721537	2003 UQ_{382}	—	October 22, 2003	Apache Point	SDSS Collaboration	·	630 m	MPC · JPL
721538	2003 US_{382}	—	March 19, 2001	Kitt Peak	Spacewatch	·	1.9 km	MPC · JPL
721539	2003 UL_{384}	—	October 22, 2003	Apache Point	SDSS	·	1.4 km	MPC · JPL
721540	2003 UG_{385}	—	February 14, 2005	Kitt Peak	Spacewatch	·	1.0 km	MPC · JPL
721541	2003 UO_{386}	—	October 5, 2003	Kitt Peak	Spacewatch	·	3.2 km	MPC · JPL
721542	2003 UM_{387}	—	October 22, 2003	Apache Point	SDSS Collaboration	·	3.2 km	MPC · JPL
721543	2003 UE_{388}	—	October 22, 2003	Kitt Peak	Spacewatch	·	3.3 km	MPC · JPL
721544	2003 UA_{389}	—	October 22, 2003	Apache Point	SDSS Collaboration	·	2.3 km	MPC · JPL
721545	2003 UR_{389}	—	October 22, 2003	Apache Point	SDSS Collaboration	·	1.2 km	MPC · JPL
721546	2003 UF_{390}	—	October 22, 2003	Apache Point	SDSS	·	1.4 km	MPC · JPL
721547	2003 UP_{390}	—	October 22, 2003	Apache Point	SDSS Collaboration	MAR	750 m	MPC · JPL
721548	2003 UY_{390}	—	October 22, 2003	Apache Point	SDSS Collaboration	LIX	3.0 km	MPC · JPL
721549	2003 UE_{393}	—	October 22, 2003	Apache Point	SDSS Collaboration	·	2.2 km	MPC · JPL
721550	2003 UH_{393}	—	October 22, 2003	Apache Point	SDSS Collaboration	·	2.4 km	MPC · JPL
721551	2003 UL_{393}	—	October 22, 2003	Apache Point	SDSS Collaboration	·	1.5 km	MPC · JPL
721552	2003 UA_{395}	—	October 22, 2003	Apache Point	SDSS Collaboration	·	1.5 km	MPC · JPL
721553	2003 UO_{395}	—	October 22, 2003	Apache Point	SDSS Collaboration	·	1.8 km	MPC · JPL
721554	2003 UR_{395}	—	October 22, 2003	Apache Point	SDSS	·	1.4 km	MPC · JPL
721555	2003 UO_{396}	—	October 22, 2003	Apache Point	SDSS Collaboration	VER	2.2 km	MPC · JPL
721556	2003 UB_{397}	—	October 22, 2003	Apache Point	SDSS Collaboration	·	3.1 km	MPC · JPL
721557	2003 UZ_{397}	—	November 20, 2003	Palomar	NEAT	LIX	3.7 km	MPC · JPL
721558	2003 UD_{398}	—	October 22, 2003	Apache Point	SDSS Collaboration	·	3.6 km	MPC · JPL
721559	2003 UN_{400}	—	October 23, 2003	Apache Point	SDSS Collaboration	·	1.8 km	MPC · JPL
721560	2003 UY_{403}	—	October 23, 2003	Apache Point	SDSS	·	2.6 km	MPC · JPL
721561	2003 UA_{405}	—	October 23, 2003	Apache Point	SDSS	NEM	1.7 km	MPC · JPL
721562	2003 UL_{405}	—	October 23, 2003	Kitt Peak	Spacewatch	·	2.5 km	MPC · JPL
721563	2003 UC_{406}	—	October 23, 2003	Kitt Peak	Spacewatch	·	2.0 km	MPC · JPL
721564	2003 UM_{406}	—	October 23, 2003	Apache Point	SDSS Collaboration	·	2.9 km	MPC · JPL
721565	2003 UW_{407}	—	October 23, 2003	Apache Point	SDSS Collaboration	·	2.5 km	MPC · JPL
721566	2003 UJ_{408}	—	October 23, 2003	Apache Point	SDSS Collaboration	·	2.5 km	MPC · JPL
721567	2003 UK_{408}	—	October 23, 2003	Apache Point	SDSS Collaboration	WIT	900 m	MPC · JPL
721568	2003 UY_{410}	—	October 23, 2003	Apache Point	SDSS Collaboration	·	1.6 km	MPC · JPL
721569	2003 UL_{411}	—	October 23, 2003	Apache Point	SDSS Collaboration	·	2.7 km	MPC · JPL
721570	2003 UY_{411}	—	January 16, 2005	Kitt Peak	Spacewatch	·	2.6 km	MPC · JPL
721571	2003 UF_{412}	—	October 23, 2003	Apache Point	SDSS Collaboration	·	1.6 km	MPC · JPL
721572	2003 UA_{414}	—	October 18, 2003	Palomar Mountain	M. E. Brown, C. A. Trujillo, D. L. Rabinowitz	res · 2:9	387 km	MPC · JPL
721573	2003 UP_{416}	—	September 29, 2003	Kitt Peak	Spacewatch	·	2.1 km	MPC · JPL
721574	2003 UT_{418}	—	September 14, 2007	Mount Lemmon	Mount Lemmon Survey	·	730 m	MPC · JPL
721575	2003 UA_{419}	—	September 20, 2003	Kitt Peak	Spacewatch	KOR	1.3 km	MPC · JPL
721576	2003 UH_{421}	—	October 17, 2003	Kitt Peak	Spacewatch	(194)	1.4 km	MPC · JPL
721577	2003 UU_{421}	—	November 10, 2009	Kitt Peak	Spacewatch	·	2.9 km	MPC · JPL
721578	2003 UM_{422}	—	October 24, 2003	Apache Point	SDSS Collaboration	·	3.2 km	MPC · JPL
721579	2003 UY_{423}	—	November 19, 2008	Mount Lemmon	Mount Lemmon Survey	·	1.6 km	MPC · JPL
721580	2003 UY_{424}	—	October 23, 2003	Apache Point	SDSS Collaboration	VER	2.6 km	MPC · JPL
721581	2003 UJ_{425}	—	February 10, 2014	Haleakala	Pan-STARRS 1	AEO	890 m	MPC · JPL
721582	2003 UN_{425}	—	October 27, 2008	Kitt Peak	Spacewatch	·	1.5 km	MPC · JPL
721583	2003 UK_{427}	—	August 10, 2007	Kitt Peak	Spacewatch	·	1.5 km	MPC · JPL
721584	2003 UZ_{427}	—	November 25, 2009	Kitt Peak	Spacewatch	(43176)	2.5 km	MPC · JPL
721585	2003 UG_{429}	—	October 24, 2013	Mount Lemmon	Mount Lemmon Survey	·	1.4 km	MPC · JPL
721586	2003 UH_{429}	—	February 28, 2010	WISE	WISE	·	2.6 km	MPC · JPL
721587	2003 UK_{430}	—	October 16, 2007	Mount Lemmon	Mount Lemmon Survey	·	1.4 km	MPC · JPL
721588	2003 UQ_{430}	—	January 12, 2010	WISE	WISE	·	3.0 km	MPC · JPL
721589	2003 UC_{432}	—	October 6, 2008	Mount Lemmon	Mount Lemmon Survey	·	2.5 km	MPC · JPL
721590	2003 UK_{432}	—	October 25, 2014	Kitt Peak	Spacewatch	·	1.9 km	MPC · JPL
721591	2003 UQ_{432}	—	April 12, 2012	Haleakala	Pan-STARRS 1	·	630 m	MPC · JPL
721592	2003 UF_{433}	—	March 2, 2011	Mount Lemmon	Mount Lemmon Survey	EOS	1.3 km	MPC · JPL
721593	2003 UH_{433}	—	September 25, 2014	Kitt Peak	Spacewatch	·	2.4 km	MPC · JPL
721594	2003 UP_{433}	—	August 20, 2008	Kitt Peak	Spacewatch	·	2.0 km	MPC · JPL
721595	2003 UQ_{433}	—	April 26, 2017	Haleakala	Pan-STARRS 1	EOS	1.6 km	MPC · JPL
721596	2003 UU_{433}	—	December 16, 2009	Kitt Peak	Spacewatch	·	2.5 km	MPC · JPL
721597	2003 UD_{434}	—	April 27, 2017	Haleakala	Pan-STARRS 1	·	1.9 km	MPC · JPL
721598	2003 UK_{435}	—	April 27, 2012	Haleakala	Pan-STARRS 1	EOS	1.4 km	MPC · JPL
721599	2003 UL_{435}	—	May 7, 2014	Haleakala	Pan-STARRS 1	·	1.0 km	MPC · JPL
721600	2003 UB_{436}	—	March 30, 2016	Haleakala	Pan-STARRS 1	·	1.8 km	MPC · JPL

== 721601–721700 ==
back to top

Designation			Discovery			Properties		Ref
Permanent	Provisional	Named after	Date	Site	Discoverer(s)	Category	Diam.	Ref
721601	2003 UW_{437}	—	October 26, 2009	Kitt Peak	Spacewatch	ELF	4.0 km	MPC · JPL
721602	2003 UG_{438}	—	September 10, 2007	Kitt Peak	Spacewatch	·	870 m	MPC · JPL
721603	2003 UW_{438}	—	February 23, 2012	Mount Lemmon	Mount Lemmon Survey	V	450 m	MPC · JPL
721604	2003 UC_{439}	—	October 14, 2014	Mount Lemmon	Mount Lemmon Survey	·	2.4 km	MPC · JPL
721605	2003 UO_{439}	—	October 10, 2016	Mount Lemmon	Mount Lemmon Survey	·	1.2 km	MPC · JPL
721606	2003 UF_{440}	—	November 2, 2008	Kitt Peak	Spacewatch	·	1.5 km	MPC · JPL
721607	2003 UM_{440}	—	February 26, 2010	WISE	WISE	·	2.9 km	MPC · JPL
721608	2003 UV_{440}	—	October 20, 2003	Kitt Peak	Spacewatch	EOS	1.5 km	MPC · JPL
721609	2003 UD_{442}	—	September 5, 2008	Kitt Peak	Spacewatch	EMA	2.2 km	MPC · JPL
721610	2003 UE_{442}	—	October 27, 2009	Kitt Peak	Spacewatch	·	3.0 km	MPC · JPL
721611	2003 UN_{443}	—	October 25, 2003	Kitt Peak	Spacewatch	·	1.8 km	MPC · JPL
721612	2003 UD_{445}	—	October 22, 2003	Kitt Peak	Deep Ecliptic Survey	·	1.3 km	MPC · JPL
721613	2003 UT_{445}	—	October 29, 2003	Kitt Peak	Spacewatch	·	2.9 km	MPC · JPL
721614	2003 UJ_{446}	—	October 23, 2003	Apache Point	SDSS Collaboration	TIR	2.1 km	MPC · JPL
721615	2003 UN_{447}	—	October 17, 2003	Kitt Peak	Spacewatch	·	1.1 km	MPC · JPL
721616	2003 UK_{449}	—	October 21, 2003	Kitt Peak	Spacewatch	AGN	850 m	MPC · JPL
721617	2003 UU_{449}	—	October 24, 2003	Apache Point	SDSS Collaboration	EOS	1.5 km	MPC · JPL
721618	2003 VP_{4}	—	November 15, 2003	Kitt Peak	Spacewatch	·	1.5 km	MPC · JPL
721619	2003 VJ_{8}	—	November 18, 2003	Palomar	NEAT	·	2.9 km	MPC · JPL
721620	2003 VU_{12}	—	November 3, 2003	Apache Point	SDSS Collaboration	EUP	3.3 km	MPC · JPL
721621	2003 WP_{18}	—	November 19, 2003	Socorro	LINEAR	·	2.8 km	MPC · JPL
721622	2003 WZ_{37}	—	November 19, 2003	Socorro	LINEAR	·	3.6 km	MPC · JPL
721623	2003 WR_{41}	—	November 20, 2003	Socorro	LINEAR	·	2.2 km	MPC · JPL
721624	2003 WU_{58}	—	November 18, 2003	Kitt Peak	Spacewatch	T_{j} (2.98) · 3:2	4.9 km	MPC · JPL
721625	2003 WP_{64}	—	November 19, 2003	Kitt Peak	Spacewatch	·	3.8 km	MPC · JPL
721626	2003 WV_{80}	—	November 20, 2003	Palomar	NEAT	·	2.9 km	MPC · JPL
721627	2003 WB_{109}	—	October 19, 2003	Kitt Peak	Spacewatch	·	2.8 km	MPC · JPL
721628	2003 WA_{110}	—	October 19, 2003	Palomar	NEAT	EOS	2.7 km	MPC · JPL
721629	2003 WJ_{163}	—	November 30, 2003	Kitt Peak	Spacewatch	THM	1.4 km	MPC · JPL
721630	2003 WX_{164}	—	November 30, 2003	Kitt Peak	Spacewatch	·	1.0 km	MPC · JPL
721631	2003 WC_{165}	—	November 30, 2003	Kitt Peak	Spacewatch	·	1.2 km	MPC · JPL
721632	2003 WH_{165}	—	November 30, 2003	Kitt Peak	Spacewatch	·	2.0 km	MPC · JPL
721633	2003 WW_{180}	—	December 14, 2003	Kitt Peak	Spacewatch	·	2.8 km	MPC · JPL
721634	2003 WT_{186}	—	November 23, 2003	Kitt Peak	Deep Ecliptic Survey	·	1.3 km	MPC · JPL
721635	2003 WQ_{195}	—	November 24, 2003	Socorro	LINEAR	·	1.3 km	MPC · JPL
721636	2003 WL_{198}	—	August 3, 2002	Palomar	NEAT	·	2.9 km	MPC · JPL
721637	2003 WW_{198}	—	February 1, 2012	Mount Lemmon	Mount Lemmon Survey	·	870 m	MPC · JPL
721638	2003 WH_{199}	—	October 18, 2003	Kitt Peak	Spacewatch	·	2.4 km	MPC · JPL
721639	2003 WK_{199}	—	May 24, 2006	Kitt Peak	Spacewatch	ARM	3.4 km	MPC · JPL
721640	2003 WQ_{201}	—	November 18, 2003	Kitt Peak	Spacewatch	(2076)	680 m	MPC · JPL
721641	2003 WT_{202}	—	March 14, 2012	Mount Lemmon	Mount Lemmon Survey	·	3.5 km	MPC · JPL
721642	2003 WA_{205}	—	February 27, 2010	WISE	WISE	·	2.4 km	MPC · JPL
721643	2003 WO_{205}	—	February 11, 2016	Haleakala	Pan-STARRS 1	EOS	1.7 km	MPC · JPL
721644	2003 WR_{205}	—	November 26, 2014	Haleakala	Pan-STARRS 1	·	2.4 km	MPC · JPL
721645	2003 WC_{206}	—	October 8, 2008	Mount Lemmon	Mount Lemmon Survey	·	2.0 km	MPC · JPL
721646	2003 WV_{206}	—	November 30, 2003	Kitt Peak	Spacewatch	·	1.6 km	MPC · JPL
721647	2003 WZ_{206}	—	September 9, 2015	Haleakala	Pan-STARRS 1	·	680 m	MPC · JPL
721648	2003 WF_{207}	—	February 12, 2010	WISE	WISE	·	3.3 km	MPC · JPL
721649	2003 WG_{207}	—	October 10, 2008	Mount Lemmon	Mount Lemmon Survey	·	1.7 km	MPC · JPL
721650	2003 WH_{207}	—	September 1, 2013	Mount Lemmon	Mount Lemmon Survey	·	2.0 km	MPC · JPL
721651	2003 WD_{208}	—	October 30, 2011	Mount Lemmon	Mount Lemmon Survey	·	760 m	MPC · JPL
721652	2003 WA_{209}	—	June 5, 2010	WISE	WISE	JUN	1.0 km	MPC · JPL
721653	2003 WG_{210}	—	November 24, 2003	Kitt Peak	Spacewatch	·	670 m	MPC · JPL
721654	2003 WU_{210}	—	February 2, 2005	Kitt Peak	Spacewatch	·	2.0 km	MPC · JPL
721655	2003 WV_{210}	—	February 25, 2011	Kitt Peak	Spacewatch	HYG	2.6 km	MPC · JPL
721656	2003 WT_{213}	—	October 7, 2008	Mount Lemmon	Mount Lemmon Survey	·	1.6 km	MPC · JPL
721657	2003 WV_{213}	—	June 14, 2018	Haleakala	Pan-STARRS 1	·	2.1 km	MPC · JPL
721658	2003 WS_{214}	—	November 20, 2003	Kitt Peak	Spacewatch	·	2.7 km	MPC · JPL
721659	2003 WO_{215}	—	November 19, 2003	Kitt Peak	Spacewatch	·	2.0 km	MPC · JPL
721660	2003 WH_{216}	—	November 24, 2003	Kitt Peak	Spacewatch	·	1.1 km	MPC · JPL
721661	2003 WQ_{217}	—	November 20, 2003	Apache Point	SDSS Collaboration	·	1.4 km	MPC · JPL
721662	2003 XT_{16}	—	December 14, 2003	Kitt Peak	Spacewatch	EUN	1.0 km	MPC · JPL
721663	2003 XD_{32}	—	December 1, 2003	Kitt Peak	Spacewatch	V	440 m	MPC · JPL
721664	2003 XK_{44}	—	December 14, 2003	Kitt Peak	Spacewatch	·	770 m	MPC · JPL
721665	2003 XF_{45}	—	December 12, 2012	Kitt Peak	Spacewatch	·	1.4 km	MPC · JPL
721666	2003 YC_{68}	—	November 26, 2003	Kitt Peak	Spacewatch	·	1.4 km	MPC · JPL
721667	2003 YE_{86}	—	December 19, 2003	Socorro	LINEAR	·	3.4 km	MPC · JPL
721668	2003 YA_{92}	—	October 5, 2002	Anderson Mesa	LONEOS	EUP	6.2 km	MPC · JPL
721669	2003 YW_{155}	—	December 25, 2003	Kitt Peak	Spacewatch	·	1.9 km	MPC · JPL
721670	2003 YM_{162}	—	December 17, 2003	Socorro	LINEAR	·	3.7 km	MPC · JPL
721671	2003 YL_{176}	—	December 16, 2003	Mauna Kea	D. D. Balam	MAS	570 m	MPC · JPL
721672	2003 YP_{178}	—	December 18, 2003	La Silla	F. Hormuth	·	2.0 km	MPC · JPL
721673	2003 YG_{185}	—	December 14, 2010	Mount Lemmon	Mount Lemmon Survey	·	550 m	MPC · JPL
721674	2003 YK_{185}	—	January 8, 2010	Kitt Peak	Spacewatch	·	3.3 km	MPC · JPL
721675	2003 YN_{185}	—	December 19, 2003	Kitt Peak	Spacewatch	·	2.2 km	MPC · JPL
721676	2003 YV_{185}	—	January 31, 2004	Kitt Peak	Spacewatch	·	2.6 km	MPC · JPL
721677	2003 YX_{185}	—	June 25, 2014	Mount Lemmon	Mount Lemmon Survey	·	1.8 km	MPC · JPL
721678	2003 YG_{187}	—	October 29, 2008	Kitt Peak	Spacewatch	·	2.0 km	MPC · JPL
721679	2003 YS_{187}	—	February 12, 2018	Haleakala	Pan-STARRS 1	·	1.7 km	MPC · JPL
721680	2003 YW_{187}	—	December 11, 2014	Mount Lemmon	Mount Lemmon Survey	V	540 m	MPC · JPL
721681	2003 YE_{188}	—	November 5, 2010	Mount Lemmon	Mount Lemmon Survey	·	760 m	MPC · JPL
721682	2003 YW_{188}	—	May 13, 2010	Mount Lemmon	Mount Lemmon Survey	·	1.4 km	MPC · JPL
721683	2003 YK_{189}	—	March 11, 2016	Haleakala	Pan-STARRS 1	·	2.1 km	MPC · JPL
721684	2004 AP_{16}	—	January 15, 2004	Kitt Peak	Spacewatch	·	1.1 km	MPC · JPL
721685	2004 AU_{16}	—	January 15, 2004	Kitt Peak	Spacewatch	·	1.4 km	MPC · JPL
721686	2004 AL_{20}	—	January 15, 2004	Kitt Peak	Spacewatch	THM	1.9 km	MPC · JPL
721687	2004 AO_{20}	—	December 28, 2003	Kitt Peak	Spacewatch	·	1.4 km	MPC · JPL
721688	2004 BO_{7}	—	January 16, 2004	Kitt Peak	Spacewatch	·	820 m	MPC · JPL
721689	2004 BF_{23}	—	December 17, 2003	Kitt Peak	Spacewatch	·	3.9 km	MPC · JPL
721690	2004 BQ_{38}	—	January 13, 2004	Kitt Peak	Spacewatch	·	710 m	MPC · JPL
721691	2004 BP_{64}	—	January 22, 2004	Socorro	LINEAR	·	850 m	MPC · JPL
721692	2004 BS_{112}	—	December 21, 2003	Kitt Peak	Spacewatch	·	2.0 km	MPC · JPL
721693	2004 BM_{123}	—	March 16, 2004	Kitt Peak	Spacewatch	·	850 m	MPC · JPL
721694	2004 BR_{125}	—	January 16, 2004	Kitt Peak	Spacewatch	·	3.6 km	MPC · JPL
721695	2004 BJ_{129}	—	January 16, 2004	Kitt Peak	Spacewatch	·	3.4 km	MPC · JPL
721696	2004 BG_{130}	—	January 16, 2004	Kitt Peak	Spacewatch	·	2.4 km	MPC · JPL
721697	2004 BY_{130}	—	January 16, 2004	Kitt Peak	Spacewatch	·	1.3 km	MPC · JPL
721698	2004 BO_{136}	—	January 19, 2004	Kitt Peak	Spacewatch	URS	2.4 km	MPC · JPL
721699	2004 BV_{136}	—	January 19, 2004	Kitt Peak	Spacewatch	EOS	1.6 km	MPC · JPL
721700	2004 BH_{137}	—	January 19, 2004	Kitt Peak	Spacewatch	EOS	3.6 km	MPC · JPL

== 721701–721800 ==
back to top

Designation			Discovery			Properties		Ref
Permanent	Provisional	Named after	Date	Site	Discoverer(s)	Category	Diam.	Ref
721701	2004 BK_{139}	—	January 19, 2004	Kitt Peak	Spacewatch	·	1.9 km	MPC · JPL
721702	2004 BO_{139}	—	January 19, 2004	Kitt Peak	Spacewatch	·	2.2 km	MPC · JPL
721703	2004 BU_{139}	—	January 19, 2004	Kitt Peak	Spacewatch	·	2.6 km	MPC · JPL
721704	2004 BX_{143}	—	January 19, 2004	Kitt Peak	Spacewatch	·	2.9 km	MPC · JPL
721705	2004 BA_{157}	—	January 28, 2004	Kitt Peak	Spacewatch	·	3.3 km	MPC · JPL
721706	2004 BL_{159}	—	March 15, 2004	Kitt Peak	Spacewatch	·	2.2 km	MPC · JPL
721707	2004 BT_{159}	—	March 23, 2004	Kitt Peak	Spacewatch	·	430 m	MPC · JPL
721708	2004 BX_{159}	—	March 23, 2004	Kitt Peak	Spacewatch	·	1.3 km	MPC · JPL
721709	2004 BB_{165}	—	December 5, 2007	Mount Lemmon	Mount Lemmon Survey	AGN	1.0 km	MPC · JPL
721710	2004 BB_{166}	—	February 17, 2004	Kitt Peak	Spacewatch	·	1.6 km	MPC · JPL
721711	2004 BR_{166}	—	February 16, 2010	Mount Lemmon	Mount Lemmon Survey	·	2.0 km	MPC · JPL
721712	2004 BP_{167}	—	September 29, 2011	Mount Lemmon	Mount Lemmon Survey	·	1.4 km	MPC · JPL
721713	2004 BR_{167}	—	January 16, 2010	Mount Lemmon	Mount Lemmon Survey	·	4.6 km	MPC · JPL
721714	2004 BA_{168}	—	June 14, 2010	WISE	WISE	·	2.6 km	MPC · JPL
721715	2004 BH_{168}	—	February 19, 2015	Kitt Peak	Spacewatch	·	810 m	MPC · JPL
721716	2004 BB_{169}	—	October 10, 2008	Mount Lemmon	Mount Lemmon Survey	·	2.6 km	MPC · JPL
721717	2004 BJ_{169}	—	August 24, 2007	Kitt Peak	Spacewatch	·	2.6 km	MPC · JPL
721718	2004 BL_{169}	—	November 17, 2008	Kitt Peak	Spacewatch	·	2.5 km	MPC · JPL
721719	2004 BR_{169}	—	May 29, 2010	WISE	WISE	·	3.1 km	MPC · JPL
721720	2004 BW_{169}	—	September 18, 2010	Mount Lemmon	Mount Lemmon Survey	NYS	850 m	MPC · JPL
721721	2004 BB_{170}	—	June 5, 2010	WISE	WISE	·	2.7 km	MPC · JPL
721722	2004 BK_{170}	—	June 13, 2018	Haleakala	Pan-STARRS 1	TIR	2.4 km	MPC · JPL
721723	2004 BD_{171}	—	January 17, 2015	Haleakala	Pan-STARRS 1	EOS	1.6 km	MPC · JPL
721724	2004 BU_{171}	—	January 16, 2010	WISE	WISE	·	580 m	MPC · JPL
721725	2004 BU_{172}	—	December 26, 2014	Haleakala	Pan-STARRS 1	·	2.7 km	MPC · JPL
721726	2004 BV_{172}	—	October 27, 2008	Kitt Peak	Spacewatch	·	2.3 km	MPC · JPL
721727	2004 BC_{173}	—	December 20, 2007	Mount Lemmon	Mount Lemmon Survey	·	1.3 km	MPC · JPL
721728	2004 BK_{173}	—	April 15, 2016	Haleakala	Pan-STARRS 1	EOS	1.6 km	MPC · JPL
721729	2004 BD_{174}	—	January 16, 2004	Kitt Peak	Spacewatch	·	2.8 km	MPC · JPL
721730	2004 CS_{8}	—	February 11, 2004	Kitt Peak	Spacewatch	·	2.9 km	MPC · JPL
721731	2004 CP_{23}	—	February 12, 2004	Kitt Peak	Spacewatch	·	990 m	MPC · JPL
721732	2004 CA_{69}	—	January 31, 2004	Kitt Peak	Spacewatch	·	1.3 km	MPC · JPL
721733	2004 CV_{101}	—	February 12, 2004	Palomar	NEAT	THB	2.7 km	MPC · JPL
721734	2004 CD_{118}	—	February 11, 2004	Kitt Peak	Spacewatch	·	3.6 km	MPC · JPL
721735	2004 CB_{122}	—	February 12, 2004	Kitt Peak	Spacewatch	WIT	800 m	MPC · JPL
721736	2004 CV_{122}	—	February 12, 2004	Kitt Peak	Spacewatch	AEO	930 m	MPC · JPL
721737	2004 CQ_{123}	—	February 12, 2004	Kitt Peak	Spacewatch	·	3.1 km	MPC · JPL
721738	2004 CH_{127}	—	February 13, 2004	Kitt Peak	Spacewatch	·	2.9 km	MPC · JPL
721739	2004 CR_{132}	—	January 14, 2011	Kitt Peak	Spacewatch	·	700 m	MPC · JPL
721740	2004 CD_{133}	—	January 27, 2010	WISE	WISE	·	2.6 km	MPC · JPL
721741	2004 CB_{134}	—	October 29, 2008	Kitt Peak	Spacewatch	H	420 m	MPC · JPL
721742	2004 CH_{134}	—	March 2, 2011	Kitt Peak	Spacewatch	·	520 m	MPC · JPL
721743	2004 CJ_{134}	—	May 7, 2014	Haleakala	Pan-STARRS 1	·	1.4 km	MPC · JPL
721744	2004 CV_{134}	—	May 14, 2008	Mount Lemmon	Mount Lemmon Survey	NYS	620 m	MPC · JPL
721745	2004 CE_{135}	—	April 19, 2010	WISE	WISE	·	1.9 km	MPC · JPL
721746	2004 CZ_{135}	—	December 21, 2014	Haleakala	Pan-STARRS 1	·	2.8 km	MPC · JPL
721747	2004 CA_{136}	—	June 8, 2010	WISE	WISE	·	960 m	MPC · JPL
721748	2004 DS_{16}	—	February 18, 2004	Kitt Peak	Spacewatch	·	4.0 km	MPC · JPL
721749	2004 DU_{17}	—	February 18, 2004	Kitt Peak	Spacewatch	·	3.4 km	MPC · JPL
721750	2004 DR_{32}	—	February 11, 2004	Palomar	NEAT	·	960 m	MPC · JPL
721751	2004 DQ_{67}	—	February 18, 2004	Kitt Peak	Spacewatch	EOS	1.6 km	MPC · JPL
721752	2004 DF_{68}	—	February 26, 2004	Kitt Peak	Deep Ecliptic Survey	AGN	920 m	MPC · JPL
721753	2004 DO_{68}	—	February 26, 2004	Kitt Peak	Deep Ecliptic Survey	·	1.6 km	MPC · JPL
721754	2004 DB_{75}	—	February 17, 2004	Kitt Peak	Spacewatch	·	2.8 km	MPC · JPL
721755	2004 DK_{81}	—	March 2, 2009	Mount Lemmon	Mount Lemmon Survey	AEO	1.2 km	MPC · JPL
721756	2004 DD_{82}	—	November 16, 2014	Calar Alto	Calar Alto	·	2.4 km	MPC · JPL
721757	2004 DF_{82}	—	January 20, 2009	Mount Lemmon	Mount Lemmon Survey	·	2.3 km	MPC · JPL
721758	2004 DN_{82}	—	October 10, 2007	Kitt Peak	Spacewatch	·	1.6 km	MPC · JPL
721759	2004 DX_{82}	—	January 18, 2008	Mount Lemmon	Mount Lemmon Survey	·	1.0 km	MPC · JPL
721760	2004 DX_{83}	—	October 3, 2006	Mount Lemmon	Mount Lemmon Survey	(2076)	520 m	MPC · JPL
721761	2004 DD_{84}	—	November 7, 2007	Kitt Peak	Spacewatch	·	1.0 km	MPC · JPL
721762	2004 DF_{84}	—	September 23, 2015	Haleakala	Pan-STARRS 1	·	1.7 km	MPC · JPL
721763	2004 DM_{85}	—	April 20, 2015	Haleakala	Pan-STARRS 1	·	680 m	MPC · JPL
721764	2004 DO_{85}	—	March 31, 2014	Mount Lemmon	Mount Lemmon Survey	HOF	2.1 km	MPC · JPL
721765	2004 DE_{88}	—	February 25, 2011	Mount Lemmon	Mount Lemmon Survey	·	590 m	MPC · JPL
721766	2004 DS_{88}	—	August 17, 2017	Haleakala	Pan-STARRS 1	·	2.3 km	MPC · JPL
721767	2004 EF	—	March 11, 2004	Wrightwood	J. W. Young	·	1.5 km	MPC · JPL
721768	2004 EA_{29}	—	March 15, 2004	Kitt Peak	Spacewatch	·	2.5 km	MPC · JPL
721769	2004 EG_{44}	—	March 14, 2004	Nogales	P. R. Holvorcem, M. Schwartz	·	1.3 km	MPC · JPL
721770	2004 ES_{44}	—	March 15, 2004	Kitt Peak	Spacewatch	·	3.2 km	MPC · JPL
721771	2004 EP_{51}	—	March 14, 2004	Kitt Peak	Spacewatch	LUT	3.1 km	MPC · JPL
721772	2004 EC_{93}	—	March 14, 2004	Kitt Peak	Spacewatch	ERI	1.0 km	MPC · JPL
721773	2004 EE_{100}	—	March 15, 2004	Kitt Peak	Spacewatch	·	2.3 km	MPC · JPL
721774	2004 EE_{101}	—	March 2, 1995	Kitt Peak	Spacewatch	·	1.6 km	MPC · JPL
721775	2004 EP_{105}	—	February 17, 2004	Kitt Peak	Spacewatch	·	870 m	MPC · JPL
721776	2004 EC_{106}	—	March 15, 2004	Kitt Peak	Spacewatch	3:2	4.8 km	MPC · JPL
721777	2004 EL_{107}	—	March 15, 2004	Kitt Peak	Spacewatch	·	470 m	MPC · JPL
721778	2004 EF_{117}	—	October 12, 2010	Mount Lemmon	Mount Lemmon Survey	MAS	560 m	MPC · JPL
721779	2004 EU_{117}	—	August 13, 2012	Haleakala	Pan-STARRS 1	·	2.4 km	MPC · JPL
721780	2004 FA_{7}	—	March 16, 2004	Kitt Peak	Spacewatch	PHO	770 m	MPC · JPL
721781	2004 FN_{12}	—	March 16, 2004	Junk Bond	D. Healy	·	2.5 km	MPC · JPL
721782	2004 FV_{43}	—	February 16, 2004	Kitt Peak	Spacewatch	EUP	4.7 km	MPC · JPL
721783	2004 FF_{60}	—	March 18, 2004	Kitt Peak	Spacewatch	·	1.4 km	MPC · JPL
721784	2004 FO_{74}	—	March 17, 2004	Kitt Peak	Spacewatch	·	920 m	MPC · JPL
721785	2004 FH_{76}	—	March 18, 2004	Kitt Peak	Spacewatch	·	3.2 km	MPC · JPL
721786	2004 FK_{79}	—	March 19, 2004	Kitt Peak	Spacewatch	·	2.1 km	MPC · JPL
721787	2004 FK_{87}	—	March 19, 2004	Palomar	NEAT	·	940 m	MPC · JPL
721788	2004 FB_{97}	—	March 23, 2004	Socorro	LINEAR	NAE	3.5 km	MPC · JPL
721789	2004 FL_{144}	—	March 29, 2004	Kitt Peak	Spacewatch	·	2.6 km	MPC · JPL
721790	2004 FL_{153}	—	March 17, 2004	Kitt Peak	Spacewatch	·	1.3 km	MPC · JPL
721791	2004 FA_{154}	—	March 17, 2004	Kitt Peak	Spacewatch	LIX	2.6 km	MPC · JPL
721792	2004 FA_{157}	—	March 17, 2004	Kitt Peak	Spacewatch	HOF	2.8 km	MPC · JPL
721793	2004 FV_{157}	—	March 17, 2004	Kitt Peak	Spacewatch	TIN	900 m	MPC · JPL
721794	2004 FP_{161}	—	March 18, 2004	Socorro	LINEAR	·	1.2 km	MPC · JPL
721795	2004 FV_{166}	—	January 28, 2007	Kitt Peak	Spacewatch	·	1.0 km	MPC · JPL
721796	2004 FJ_{168}	—	November 9, 2013	Haleakala	Pan-STARRS 1	·	3.3 km	MPC · JPL
721797	2004 FO_{168}	—	September 28, 2006	Mount Lemmon	Mount Lemmon Survey	NYS	770 m	MPC · JPL
721798	2004 FF_{169}	—	September 26, 2006	Mount Lemmon	Mount Lemmon Survey	·	2.2 km	MPC · JPL
721799	2004 FN_{169}	—	February 26, 2011	Mount Lemmon	Mount Lemmon Survey	·	990 m	MPC · JPL
721800	2004 FB_{170}	—	March 18, 2004	Kitt Peak	Spacewatch	·	1.3 km	MPC · JPL

== 721801–721900 ==
back to top

Designation			Discovery			Properties		Ref
Permanent	Provisional	Named after	Date	Site	Discoverer(s)	Category	Diam.	Ref
721801	2004 FV_{170}	—	February 20, 2012	Haleakala	Pan-STARRS 1	·	1.2 km	MPC · JPL
721802	2004 FB_{171}	—	March 16, 2004	Kitt Peak	Spacewatch	·	2.8 km	MPC · JPL
721803	2004 FQ_{172}	—	September 14, 2005	Kitt Peak	Spacewatch	NYS	940 m	MPC · JPL
721804	2004 FJ_{173}	—	September 16, 2012	Mount Lemmon	Mount Lemmon Survey	·	2.8 km	MPC · JPL
721805	2004 FG_{174}	—	February 3, 2013	Haleakala	Pan-STARRS 1	·	1.5 km	MPC · JPL
721806	2004 FL_{174}	—	October 4, 2006	Mount Lemmon	Mount Lemmon Survey	·	1 km	MPC · JPL
721807	2004 FV_{174}	—	January 27, 2007	Kitt Peak	Spacewatch	·	500 m	MPC · JPL
721808	2004 FJ_{175}	—	March 16, 2004	Kitt Peak	Spacewatch	·	3.4 km	MPC · JPL
721809	2004 FH_{176}	—	May 23, 2014	Haleakala	Pan-STARRS 1	·	1.5 km	MPC · JPL
721810	2004 FT_{176}	—	March 18, 2018	Haleakala	Pan-STARRS 1	·	1.6 km	MPC · JPL
721811	2004 FC_{177}	—	December 22, 2008	Kitt Peak	Spacewatch	·	2.4 km	MPC · JPL
721812	2004 FF_{178}	—	April 10, 2010	Mount Lemmon	Mount Lemmon Survey	EUP	2.4 km	MPC · JPL
721813	2004 GC_{6}	—	April 12, 2004	Kitt Peak	Spacewatch	·	3.1 km	MPC · JPL
721814	2004 GD_{6}	—	April 12, 2004	Kitt Peak	Spacewatch	·	3.5 km	MPC · JPL
721815	2004 GM_{6}	—	March 17, 2004	Kitt Peak	Spacewatch	·	1.3 km	MPC · JPL
721816	2004 GK_{10}	—	April 12, 2004	Kitt Peak	Spacewatch	TIR	2.6 km	MPC · JPL
721817	2004 GC_{51}	—	April 13, 2004	Kitt Peak	Spacewatch	THM	1.8 km	MPC · JPL
721818	2004 GQ_{67}	—	April 13, 2004	Kitt Peak	Spacewatch	TIN	860 m	MPC · JPL
721819	2004 GT_{86}	—	March 31, 2004	Kitt Peak	Spacewatch	(18466)	2.0 km	MPC · JPL
721820	2004 GS_{91}	—	September 11, 2015	Haleakala	Pan-STARRS 1	AGN	980 m	MPC · JPL
721821	2004 HC_{1}	—	April 1, 2004	Kitt Peak	Spacewatch	·	650 m	MPC · JPL
721822	2004 HZ_{14}	—	April 16, 2004	Kitt Peak	Spacewatch	·	2.5 km	MPC · JPL
721823	2004 HV_{15}	—	April 16, 2004	Kitt Peak	Spacewatch	LIX	3.4 km	MPC · JPL
721824	2004 HE_{20}	—	April 20, 2004	Siding Spring	SSS	·	4.4 km	MPC · JPL
721825	2004 HZ_{37}	—	April 23, 2004	Kitt Peak	Spacewatch	·	1.7 km	MPC · JPL
721826	2004 HE_{46}	—	April 21, 2004	Siding Spring	SSS	·	2.2 km	MPC · JPL
721827	2004 HU_{77}	—	April 26, 2004	Mauna Kea	P. A. Wiegert, D. D. Balam	·	1.4 km	MPC · JPL
721828	2004 HE_{81}	—	February 9, 2008	Kitt Peak	Spacewatch	AST	1.6 km	MPC · JPL
721829	2004 HO_{81}	—	December 7, 2015	Haleakala	Pan-STARRS 1	·	620 m	MPC · JPL
721830	2004 HV_{81}	—	April 19, 2004	Kitt Peak	Spacewatch	·	950 m	MPC · JPL
721831	2004 HF_{82}	—	February 26, 2011	Mount Lemmon	Mount Lemmon Survey	·	780 m	MPC · JPL
721832	2004 HR_{82}	—	July 23, 2015	Haleakala	Pan-STARRS 1	·	640 m	MPC · JPL
721833	2004 HB_{83}	—	August 20, 2015	Kitt Peak	Spacewatch	·	610 m	MPC · JPL
721834	2004 HG_{83}	—	July 27, 2010	WISE	WISE	·	1.6 km	MPC · JPL
721835	2004 HV_{83}	—	January 14, 2011	Mount Lemmon	Mount Lemmon Survey	·	840 m	MPC · JPL
721836	2004 HE_{84}	—	March 19, 2010	WISE	WISE	T_{j} (2.98) · EUP	3.2 km	MPC · JPL
721837	2004 HG_{84}	—	February 24, 2014	Haleakala	Pan-STARRS 1	L4 · 006	7.3 km	MPC · JPL
721838	2004 JN_{33}	—	May 15, 2004	Socorro	LINEAR	·	840 m	MPC · JPL
721839	2004 JK_{56}	—	May 13, 2004	Apache Point	SDSS Collaboration	H	450 m	MPC · JPL
721840	2004 JV_{56}	—	October 24, 2005	Kitt Peak	Spacewatch	MAS	620 m	MPC · JPL
721841	2004 KY_{19}	—	March 8, 2009	Mount Lemmon	Mount Lemmon Survey	·	2.7 km	MPC · JPL
721842	2004 KA_{21}	—	May 22, 2004	Apache Point	SDSS	·	3.0 km	MPC · JPL
721843	2004 KQ_{21}	—	September 14, 2017	Haleakala	Pan-STARRS 1	T_{j} (2.99) · EUP	3.1 km	MPC · JPL
721844	2004 KD_{22}	—	March 8, 2010	WISE	WISE	PHO	1.1 km	MPC · JPL
721845	2004 LY_{3}	—	October 19, 1998	Kitt Peak	Spacewatch	·	700 m	MPC · JPL
721846	2004 LT_{14}	—	June 11, 2004	Kitt Peak	Spacewatch	·	1.8 km	MPC · JPL
721847	2004 LR_{31}	—	May 27, 2004	Kitt Peak	Spacewatch	centaur	80 km	MPC · JPL
721848	2004 LF_{33}	—	June 14, 2004	Kitt Peak	Spacewatch	·	3.9 km	MPC · JPL
721849	2004 MF_{9}	—	May 31, 2010	WISE	WISE	·	2.7 km	MPC · JPL
721850	2004 MJ_{9}	—	August 29, 2005	Kitt Peak	Spacewatch	·	2.2 km	MPC · JPL
721851	2004 MP_{9}	—	June 5, 2010	WISE	WISE	EUP	3.9 km	MPC · JPL
721852	2004 NS_{19}	—	July 14, 2004	Socorro	LINEAR	·	1.5 km	MPC · JPL
721853	2004 OW_{16}	—	July 24, 2010	WISE	WISE	·	3.0 km	MPC · JPL
721854	2004 PN_{29}	—	July 24, 2010	WISE	WISE	THM	2.5 km	MPC · JPL
721855	2004 PQ_{62}	—	August 10, 2004	Socorro	LINEAR	·	3.0 km	MPC · JPL
721856	2004 PV_{80}	—	August 10, 2004	Socorro	LINEAR	MAS	670 m	MPC · JPL
721857	2004 PQ_{99}	—	August 11, 2004	Socorro	LINEAR	(69559)	2.8 km	MPC · JPL
721858	2004 PW_{118}	—	August 9, 2004	Palomar	NEAT	·	2.9 km	MPC · JPL
721859	2004 PG_{120}	—	February 17, 2007	Kitt Peak	Spacewatch	NYS	1.1 km	MPC · JPL
721860	2004 PV_{120}	—	August 10, 2004	Campo Imperatore	CINEOS	·	1.0 km	MPC · JPL
721861	2004 QK_{8}	—	September 2, 1992	Siding Spring	R. H. McNaught, A. Savage	·	1.6 km	MPC · JPL
721862	2004 QM_{31}	—	July 19, 2010	WISE	WISE	·	3.1 km	MPC · JPL
721863	2004 QP_{33}	—	October 18, 2012	Haleakala	Pan-STARRS 1	·	960 m	MPC · JPL
721864	2004 QG_{34}	—	November 19, 2008	Mount Lemmon	Mount Lemmon Survey	·	660 m	MPC · JPL
721865	2004 QQ_{35}	—	September 1, 2014	Mount Lemmon	Mount Lemmon Survey	·	1.7 km	MPC · JPL
721866	2004 QR_{36}	—	August 22, 2004	Kitt Peak	Spacewatch	·	710 m	MPC · JPL
721867	2004 RJ_{25}	—	August 23, 2004	Kitt Peak	Spacewatch	PHO	880 m	MPC · JPL
721868	2004 RY_{51}	—	August 14, 2004	Palomar	NEAT	MAS	770 m	MPC · JPL
721869	2004 RS_{64}	—	September 8, 2004	Socorro	LINEAR	·	2.4 km	MPC · JPL
721870	2004 RG_{83}	—	September 9, 2004	Socorro	LINEAR	THM	3.0 km	MPC · JPL
721871	2004 RC_{117}	—	September 7, 2004	Kitt Peak	Spacewatch	KOR	1.1 km	MPC · JPL
721872	2004 RL_{118}	—	August 12, 2004	Cerro Tololo	Deep Ecliptic Survey	·	3.0 km	MPC · JPL
721873	2004 RA_{119}	—	September 7, 2004	Palomar	NEAT	URS	3.3 km	MPC · JPL
721874	2004 RA_{131}	—	September 7, 2004	Kitt Peak	Spacewatch	·	1.8 km	MPC · JPL
721875	2004 RT_{133}	—	September 7, 2004	Kitt Peak	Spacewatch	MIS	1.7 km	MPC · JPL
721876	2004 RU_{134}	—	September 7, 2004	Kitt Peak	Spacewatch	AEO	960 m	MPC · JPL
721877	2004 RZ_{134}	—	September 7, 2004	Kitt Peak	Spacewatch	URS	2.4 km	MPC · JPL
721878	2004 RT_{139}	—	September 8, 2004	Socorro	LINEAR	·	3.7 km	MPC · JPL
721879	2004 RG_{141}	—	September 17, 1995	La Silla	C.-I. Lagerkvist	·	2.0 km	MPC · JPL
721880	2004 RK_{161}	—	September 10, 2004	Kitt Peak	Spacewatch	(5)	3.8 km	MPC · JPL
721881	2004 RR_{209}	—	April 2, 2003	Cerro Tololo	Deep Lens Survey	·	4.1 km	MPC · JPL
721882	2004 RK_{238}	—	September 10, 2004	Kitt Peak	Spacewatch	·	470 m	MPC · JPL
721883	2004 RM_{242}	—	September 10, 2004	Kitt Peak	Spacewatch	·	2.7 km	MPC · JPL
721884	2004 RK_{244}	—	September 10, 2004	Kitt Peak	Spacewatch	·	1.5 km	MPC · JPL
721885	2004 RP_{244}	—	September 10, 2004	Kitt Peak	Spacewatch	·	1.8 km	MPC · JPL
721886	2004 RK_{259}	—	September 10, 2004	Kitt Peak	Spacewatch	·	940 m	MPC · JPL
721887	2004 RM_{261}	—	September 10, 2004	Kitt Peak	Spacewatch	·	1.1 km	MPC · JPL
721888	2004 RO_{266}	—	September 11, 2004	Kitt Peak	Spacewatch	·	1.3 km	MPC · JPL
721889	2004 RA_{269}	—	September 11, 2004	Kitt Peak	Spacewatch	MIS	2.1 km	MPC · JPL
721890	2004 RK_{277}	—	September 13, 2004	Kitt Peak	Spacewatch	·	1.4 km	MPC · JPL
721891	2004 RH_{285}	—	September 15, 2004	Kitt Peak	Spacewatch	·	2.6 km	MPC · JPL
721892	2004 RH_{286}	—	September 15, 2004	Kitt Peak	Spacewatch	·	470 m	MPC · JPL
721893	2004 RB_{300}	—	September 11, 2004	Kitt Peak	Spacewatch	·	3.2 km	MPC · JPL
721894	2004 RT_{304}	—	October 24, 2000	Socorro	LINEAR	·	1.5 km	MPC · JPL
721895	2004 RG_{313}	—	September 15, 2004	Kitt Peak	Spacewatch	·	2.6 km	MPC · JPL
721896	2004 RA_{350}	—	September 12, 2004	Mauna Kea	P. A. Wiegert, S. Popa	·	1.7 km	MPC · JPL
721897	2004 RG_{354}	—	March 16, 2007	Mount Lemmon	Mount Lemmon Survey	·	940 m	MPC · JPL
721898	2004 RR_{358}	—	March 8, 2013	Haleakala	Pan-STARRS 1	·	500 m	MPC · JPL
721899	2004 RF_{360}	—	September 9, 2004	Kitt Peak	Spacewatch	·	1.3 km	MPC · JPL
721900	2004 RH_{360}	—	August 15, 2014	Haleakala	Pan-STARRS 1	EOS	1.5 km	MPC · JPL

== 721901–722000 ==
back to top

Designation			Discovery			Properties		Ref
Permanent	Provisional	Named after	Date	Site	Discoverer(s)	Category	Diam.	Ref
721901	2004 RS_{361}	—	February 28, 2010	WISE	WISE	·	1.3 km	MPC · JPL
721902	2004 RG_{362}	—	September 12, 2004	Kitt Peak	Spacewatch	·	650 m	MPC · JPL
721903	2004 RQ_{363}	—	September 15, 2004	Kitt Peak	Spacewatch	THM	2.0 km	MPC · JPL
721904	2004 RN_{364}	—	September 2, 2014	Haleakala	Pan-STARRS 1	·	1.7 km	MPC · JPL
721905	2004 SB_{27}	—	September 16, 2004	Kitt Peak	Spacewatch	·	990 m	MPC · JPL
721906	2004 SW_{63}	—	February 11, 2010	WISE	WISE	·	1.7 km	MPC · JPL
721907	2004 SV_{65}	—	September 17, 2004	Mauna Kea	Pittichová, J.	·	2.7 km	MPC · JPL
721908	2004 SY_{65}	—	September 17, 2004	Kitt Peak	Spacewatch	EOS	1.2 km	MPC · JPL
721909	2004 TH_{9}	—	October 6, 2004	Kitt Peak	Spacewatch	·	1.2 km	MPC · JPL
721910	2004 TV_{31}	—	October 4, 2004	Kitt Peak	Spacewatch	·	1.8 km	MPC · JPL
721911	2004 TK_{51}	—	October 4, 2004	Kitt Peak	Spacewatch	·	1.2 km	MPC · JPL
721912	2004 TP_{57}	—	October 5, 2004	Kitt Peak	Spacewatch	·	1.6 km	MPC · JPL
721913	2004 TF_{65}	—	October 5, 2004	Palomar	NEAT	·	710 m	MPC · JPL
721914	2004 TQ_{70}	—	October 6, 2004	Kitt Peak	Spacewatch	·	770 m	MPC · JPL
721915	2004 TR_{70}	—	October 6, 2004	Kitt Peak	Spacewatch	·	470 m	MPC · JPL
721916	2004 TD_{77}	—	February 12, 2002	Kitt Peak	Spacewatch	AST	1.6 km	MPC · JPL
721917	2004 TJ_{114}	—	October 8, 2004	Kitt Peak	Spacewatch	·	870 m	MPC · JPL
721918	2004 TU_{119}	—	November 28, 2000	Kitt Peak	Spacewatch	·	1.3 km	MPC · JPL
721919	2004 TK_{120}	—	October 6, 2004	Palomar	NEAT	·	1.1 km	MPC · JPL
721920	2004 TS_{132}	—	October 7, 2004	Palomar	NEAT	KON	2.6 km	MPC · JPL
721921	2004 TN_{143}	—	October 4, 2004	Kitt Peak	Spacewatch	·	1.7 km	MPC · JPL
721922	2004 TY_{149}	—	October 6, 2004	Kitt Peak	Spacewatch	·	1.5 km	MPC · JPL
721923	2004 TC_{154}	—	October 6, 2004	Kitt Peak	Spacewatch	·	2.7 km	MPC · JPL
721924	2004 TP_{157}	—	October 6, 2004	Kitt Peak	Spacewatch	·	3.3 km	MPC · JPL
721925	2004 TS_{177}	—	October 7, 2004	Kitt Peak	Spacewatch	·	1.5 km	MPC · JPL
721926	2004 TU_{181}	—	October 7, 2004	Kitt Peak	Spacewatch	MAS	700 m	MPC · JPL
721927	2004 TY_{186}	—	October 7, 2004	Kitt Peak	Spacewatch	·	1.5 km	MPC · JPL
721928	2004 TA_{193}	—	October 7, 2004	Kitt Peak	Spacewatch	·	700 m	MPC · JPL
721929	2004 TF_{209}	—	September 17, 2004	Socorro	LINEAR	·	1.2 km	MPC · JPL
721930	2004 TT_{213}	—	October 9, 2004	Kitt Peak	Spacewatch	·	1.7 km	MPC · JPL
721931	2004 TY_{234}	—	October 8, 2004	Kitt Peak	Spacewatch	·	1.4 km	MPC · JPL
721932	2004 TK_{235}	—	October 8, 2004	Kitt Peak	Spacewatch	·	1.4 km	MPC · JPL
721933	2004 TK_{237}	—	October 9, 2004	Kitt Peak	Spacewatch	·	810 m	MPC · JPL
721934	2004 TV_{244}	—	October 7, 2004	Kitt Peak	Spacewatch	·	800 m	MPC · JPL
721935	2004 TJ_{248}	—	October 7, 2004	Kitt Peak	Spacewatch	·	990 m	MPC · JPL
721936	2004 TB_{255}	—	October 9, 2004	Kitt Peak	Spacewatch	·	2.8 km	MPC · JPL
721937	2004 TZ_{259}	—	October 9, 2004	Kitt Peak	Spacewatch	·	2.0 km	MPC · JPL
721938	2004 TL_{270}	—	October 9, 2004	Kitt Peak	Spacewatch	·	750 m	MPC · JPL
721939	2004 TB_{279}	—	October 9, 2004	Kitt Peak	Spacewatch	·	960 m	MPC · JPL
721940	2004 TW_{283}	—	October 8, 2004	Anderson Mesa	LONEOS	·	3.6 km	MPC · JPL
721941	2004 TT_{294}	—	September 30, 2014	Kitt Peak	Spacewatch	KOR	1.3 km	MPC · JPL
721942	2004 TV_{305}	—	October 10, 2004	Socorro	LINEAR	·	3.7 km	MPC · JPL
721943	2004 TN_{313}	—	October 11, 2004	Kitt Peak	Spacewatch	HOF	2.4 km	MPC · JPL
721944	2004 TF_{350}	—	September 7, 2004	Kitt Peak	Spacewatch	·	970 m	MPC · JPL
721945	2004 TL_{358}	—	September 15, 2004	Kitt Peak	Spacewatch	·	1.6 km	MPC · JPL
721946	2004 TA_{372}	—	October 4, 2004	Palomar	NEAT	·	1.7 km	MPC · JPL
721947	2004 TS_{372}	—	January 5, 2006	Mount Lemmon	Mount Lemmon Survey	·	1.6 km	MPC · JPL
721948	2004 TN_{374}	—	June 20, 2010	WISE	WISE	T_{j} (2.98) · EUP	3.2 km	MPC · JPL
721949	2004 TW_{374}	—	September 23, 2011	Haleakala	Pan-STARRS 1	·	720 m	MPC · JPL
721950	2004 TZ_{374}	—	March 13, 2007	Kitt Peak	Spacewatch	·	1.7 km	MPC · JPL
721951	2004 TB_{375}	—	June 1, 2010	WISE	WISE	·	840 m	MPC · JPL
721952	2004 TG_{375}	—	October 10, 2004	Kitt Peak	Spacewatch	PHO	810 m	MPC · JPL
721953	2004 TF_{377}	—	August 28, 2014	Haleakala	Pan-STARRS 1	·	1.8 km	MPC · JPL
721954	2004 TF_{378}	—	December 2, 2008	Kitt Peak	Spacewatch	·	810 m	MPC · JPL
721955	2004 TW_{382}	—	March 23, 2012	Mount Lemmon	Mount Lemmon Survey	·	1.4 km	MPC · JPL
721956	2004 TC_{384}	—	October 18, 2009	Mount Lemmon	Mount Lemmon Survey	·	1.5 km	MPC · JPL
721957	2004 TM_{386}	—	March 23, 2003	Apache Point	SDSS Collaboration	·	1.3 km	MPC · JPL
721958	2004 VJ_{10}	—	October 13, 2004	Kitt Peak	Spacewatch	·	1.0 km	MPC · JPL
721959	2004 VP_{58}	—	November 9, 2004	Catalina	CSS	·	1.5 km	MPC · JPL
721960	2004 VT_{58}	—	November 9, 2004	Catalina	CSS	EMA	3.1 km	MPC · JPL
721961	2004 VV_{83}	—	November 10, 2004	Kitt Peak	Spacewatch	·	1.6 km	MPC · JPL
721962	2004 VS_{100}	—	November 9, 2004	Mauna Kea	Veillet, C.	·	470 m	MPC · JPL
721963	2004 VM_{105}	—	November 4, 2004	Kitt Peak	Spacewatch	·	820 m	MPC · JPL
721964	2004 VO_{111}	—	April 13, 2010	WISE	WISE	·	1.5 km	MPC · JPL
721965	2004 VM_{113}	—	November 9, 2004	Mauna Kea	P. A. Wiegert, A. Papadimos	EOS	1.3 km	MPC · JPL
721966	2004 VY_{119}	—	November 11, 2004	Kitt Peak	Deep Ecliptic Survey	·	1.2 km	MPC · JPL
721967	2004 VN_{133}	—	April 14, 2010	WISE	WISE	·	2.1 km	MPC · JPL
721968	2004 VF_{134}	—	October 9, 2013	Mount Lemmon	Mount Lemmon Survey	AEO	930 m	MPC · JPL
721969	2004 VR_{134}	—	September 25, 2009	Kitt Peak	Spacewatch	·	1.7 km	MPC · JPL
721970	2004 VL_{136}	—	May 21, 2014	Haleakala	Pan-STARRS 1	·	1.0 km	MPC · JPL
721971	2004 VD_{137}	—	April 2, 2006	Kitt Peak	Spacewatch	·	1.8 km	MPC · JPL
721972	2004 VG_{138}	—	November 11, 2004	Kitt Peak	Spacewatch	·	1.0 km	MPC · JPL
721973	2004 WJ_{1}	—	November 17, 2004	Campo Imperatore	CINEOS	PHO	990 m	MPC · JPL
721974	2004 XC_{14}	—	December 9, 2004	Kitt Peak	Spacewatch	·	1.4 km	MPC · JPL
721975	2004 XT_{36}	—	December 11, 2004	Campo Imperatore	CINEOS	·	1.7 km	MPC · JPL
721976	2004 XQ_{48}	—	December 10, 2004	Kitt Peak	Spacewatch	·	2.7 km	MPC · JPL
721977	2004 XN_{55}	—	December 10, 2004	Kitt Peak	Spacewatch	·	1.3 km	MPC · JPL
721978	2004 XF_{64}	—	December 2, 2004	Kitt Peak	Spacewatch	·	1.4 km	MPC · JPL
721979	2004 XF_{67}	—	June 5, 1995	Kitt Peak	Spacewatch	LUT	4.2 km	MPC · JPL
721980	2004 XT_{91}	—	December 11, 2004	Kitt Peak	Spacewatch	·	960 m	MPC · JPL
721981	2004 XP_{97}	—	December 11, 2004	Kitt Peak	Spacewatch	·	2.2 km	MPC · JPL
721982	2004 XL_{119}	—	December 12, 2004	Kitt Peak	Spacewatch	(5)	1.2 km	MPC · JPL
721983	2004 XF_{130}	—	December 15, 2004	Socorro	LINEAR	·	2.6 km	MPC · JPL
721984	2004 XV_{140}	—	September 20, 2003	Palomar	NEAT	EOS	2.2 km	MPC · JPL
721985	2004 XR_{142}	—	December 9, 2004	Kitt Peak	Spacewatch	·	1.3 km	MPC · JPL
721986	2004 XT_{149}	—	December 14, 2004	Kitt Peak	Spacewatch	H	410 m	MPC · JPL
721987	2004 XG_{152}	—	December 15, 2004	Kitt Peak	Spacewatch	3:2	3.4 km	MPC · JPL
721988	2004 XB_{155}	—	December 15, 2004	Kitt Peak	Spacewatch	·	4.8 km	MPC · JPL
721989	2004 XL_{156}	—	December 14, 2004	Kitt Peak	Spacewatch	(5)	1.8 km	MPC · JPL
721990	2004 XD_{158}	—	December 14, 2004	Kitt Peak	Spacewatch	·	2.3 km	MPC · JPL
721991	2004 XG_{161}	—	December 14, 2004	Kitt Peak	Spacewatch	V	790 m	MPC · JPL
721992	2004 XN_{163}	—	December 15, 2004	Kitt Peak	Spacewatch	·	1.9 km	MPC · JPL
721993	2004 XJ_{169}	—	December 9, 2004	Kitt Peak	Spacewatch	·	5.5 km	MPC · JPL
721994	2004 XL_{180}	—	December 14, 2004	Kitt Peak	Spacewatch	·	560 m	MPC · JPL
721995	2004 XO_{182}	—	December 1, 2004	Palomar	NEAT	·	1.7 km	MPC · JPL
721996	2004 XD_{189}	—	December 15, 2004	Mauna Kea	P. A. Wiegert, D. D. Balam	·	1.9 km	MPC · JPL
721997	2004 XL_{194}	—	November 30, 2008	Kitt Peak	Spacewatch	·	800 m	MPC · JPL
721998	2004 XQ_{194}	—	December 21, 2012	Mount Lemmon	Mount Lemmon Survey	(5)	980 m	MPC · JPL
721999	2004 XD_{195}	—	September 9, 2015	Haleakala	Pan-STARRS 1	·	1.1 km	MPC · JPL
722000	2004 XW_{195}	—	December 3, 2004	Kitt Peak	Spacewatch	JUN	970 m	MPC · JPL

back to top

== Meaning of names ==
As minor planet discoveries are confirmed, they are given a permanent number by the IAU's Minor Planet Center (MPC), and the discoverers can then submit names for them, following the IAU's naming conventions. The list below concerns those minor planets in the specified number-range that have received names, and explains the meanings of those names.

Official naming citations of newly named small Solar System bodies are approved and published in a bulletin by IAU's Working Group for Small Bodies Nomenclature (WGSBN). Before May 2021, citations were published in MPC's Minor Planet Circulars for many decades. Recent citations can also be found on the JPL Small-Body Database (SBDB). Until his death in 2016, German astronomer Lutz D. Schmadel compiled these citations into the Dictionary of Minor Planet Names (DMP) and regularly updated the collection.

Based on Paul Herget's The Names of the Minor Planets, Schmadel also researched the unclear origin of numerous asteroids, most of which had been named prior to World War II. This article incorporates text from this source, which is in the public domain: SBDB New namings may only be added to this list below after official publication as the preannouncement of names is condemned. The WGSBN publishes a comprehensive guideline for the naming rules of non-cometary small Solar System bodies.

Named minor planet	Provisional	This minor planet was named for...	Ref · Catalog
721153 Gunda	2003 AM_{93}	Gunda Hormuth, mother of the discoverer.	IAU · 721153
721153 Heinz	2003 AQ_{93}	Heinz Georg Hormuth, father of the discoverer	IAU · 721154
