= William Griffith =

William Griffith may refer to:

== Politicians ==
- William Griffith the Hael (c. 1445–c. 1540), Welsh politician
- William Griffith (born 1480) (1480–1545), his son, Welsh politician
- William Griffith (MP fl.1586), member of parliament (MP) for Caernarvon Boroughs
- William Griffith (MP fl.1597), MP for Caernarvonshire
- William Griffith (1620–1688), Welsh MP for Caernarvon
- William Griffith (1686–1715), Welsh MP for Caernarvon and Caernarvonshire
- William Griffith (US politician), see United States House of Representatives elections, 2006
- William B. Griffith (1795–1827), American attorney and orator
- William Downes Griffith (1829–1908), Irish politician and attorney general of the Cape Colony

== Sports ==
- Billy Griffith (footballer) (William Charles Griffith, 1880–1949), Australian rules footballer
- William Griffith (canoeist) (born 1947), Canadian canoeist
- William Griffith (cricketer) (1871-1948), South African cricketer

== Others ==
- William Griffith (New Jersey attorney) (1766–1826), briefly served as a United States federal judge
- William Griffith (astronomer) (born 1956), Californian amateur astronomer
- William Griffith (botanist) (1810–1845)
- Bill Griffith (William Henry Jackson Griffith, born 1944), American cartoonist
- William Griffith (murderer) (died 1863), participant in the Marais des Cygnes massacre, for which he was later executed
- William Alexander Griffith (1866–1940), American painter and educator
- William Pettit Griffith (1815–1884), English architect and antiquarian

== See also ==
- William Griffiths (disambiguation)
- Billy Griffith (Stewart Cathie Griffith, 1914–1993), English cricketer
- Bill J. Griffith (1905–1994), Australian rules footballer
