= William Griffiths =

William, Will, Bill or Billy Griffiths may refer to:

== Sports ==
- Billy Griffiths (footballer, born 1876), (1876–1946), English footballer
- Bill Griffiths (footballer, born 1879) (1879–1928), Australian rules footballer
- Bill Griffiths (footballer, born 1896) (1896–1970), Australian rules footballer
- Bill Griffiths (footballer, born 1921) (1921-1964), English footballer, see List of Bury F.C. players
- William Griffiths (field hockey) (1922–2010), British Olympic hockey player
- William Griffiths (boxer) (born 1932), Australian Olympic boxer
- Will Griffiths (rugby union) (born 1998), Welsh rugby union player

== Others ==
- William Griffiths (VC) (1841–1879), Irish recipient of the Victoria Cross
- William Griffiths (politician) (1912–1973), British politician
- Hugh Griffiths, Baron Griffiths (William Hugh Griffiths, 1923–2015), British soldier, cricketer, judge and life peer
- William Garonwy Griffiths (born 1955), American author
- Bill Griffiths (poet) (1948–2007), British poet and scholar
- Billy Griffiths (writer), Australian historian and writer

== See also ==
- Billy Griffith (Stewart Cathie Griffith, 1914–1993), cricketer and cricket administrator
- Robert William Griffiths (1896–1962), Welsh farmer and businessman
- William Griffith (disambiguation)
