= Hael =

Hael or Haël may refer to:

== People ==
- Ithel Hael, early sixth century prince of Armorica
- Mordaf Hael, sixth century dynast written about in the Black Book of Chirk
- Rhydderch Hael (fl. died 614), ruler of Alt Clut
- William Griffith the Hael (1445–1540), Welsh politician

== Other ==
- Hael, a cultivar of Karuka
- Haël Workshops for Artistic Ceramics, German stoneware manufacturer
- Lower Hael Wood, a woodland in Wales
