= List of minor planets: 228001–229000 =

The following is a partial list of minor planets, running from minor-planet number 228001 through 229000, inclusive. The primary data for this and other partial lists is based on JPL's "Small-Body Orbital Elements" and data available from the Minor Planet Center. Critical list information is also provided by the MPC, unless otherwise specified from Lowell Observatory. A detailed description of the table's columns and additional sources are given on the main page including a complete list of every page in this series, and a statistical break-up on the dynamical classification of minor planets.

Also see the summary list of all named bodies in numerical and alphabetical order, and the corresponding naming citations for the number range of this particular list. New namings may only be added to this list after official publication, as the preannouncement of names is condemned by the Working Group for Small Bodies Nomenclature of the International Astronomical Union.

Near-Earth obj.	MBA (inner)	MBA (outer)	Centaur
Mars-crosser	MBA (middle)	Jupiter trojan	Trans-Neptunian obj.
Unclassified

== 228001–228100 ==
Designation			Discovery			Properties		Ref
Permanent	Provisional	Named after	Date	Site	Discoverer(s)	Category	Diam.	Ref
228001	2007 MD_{5}	—	June 17, 2007	Kitt Peak	Spacewatch	·	3.6 km	MPC · JPL
228002	2007 MP_{7}	—	June 18, 2007	Kitt Peak	Spacewatch	·	5.0 km	MPC · JPL
228003	2007 MF_{12}	—	June 21, 2007	Mount Lemmon	Mount Lemmon Survey	·	4.7 km	MPC · JPL
228004	2007 QC_{5}	—	August 31, 2007	Siding Spring	K. Sárneczky, L. Kiss	L4	9.8 km	MPC · JPL
228005	2007 QR_{12}	—	August 16, 2007	XuYi	PMO NEO Survey Program	L4	12 km	MPC · JPL
228006	2007 RL_{6}	—	September 3, 2007	Pla D'Arguines	R. Ferrando	L4	14 km	MPC · JPL
228007	2007 RE_{27}	—	September 4, 2007	Mount Lemmon	Mount Lemmon Survey	L4 · ERY	11 km	MPC · JPL
228008	2007 RG_{157}	—	September 11, 2007	Mount Lemmon	Mount Lemmon Survey	L4	12 km	MPC · JPL
228009	2007 RL_{162}	—	September 14, 2007	Anderson Mesa	LONEOS	L4	13 km	MPC · JPL
228010	2007 RL_{164}	—	September 10, 2007	Kitt Peak	Spacewatch	L4	10 km	MPC · JPL
228011	2007 RB_{288}	—	September 11, 2007	Mount Lemmon	Mount Lemmon Survey	L4	10 km	MPC · JPL
228012	2008 CE_{192}	—	February 2, 2008	Kitt Peak	Spacewatch	H	750 m	MPC · JPL
228013	2008 DK_{17}	—	February 24, 2008	Kitt Peak	Spacewatch	·	1.9 km	MPC · JPL
228014	2008 ER_{41}	—	March 4, 2008	Kitt Peak	Spacewatch	NYS	1.3 km	MPC · JPL
228015	2008 ED_{139}	—	March 11, 2008	Kitt Peak	Spacewatch	·	1.7 km	MPC · JPL
228016	2008 EH_{147}	—	March 1, 2008	Kitt Peak	Spacewatch	·	800 m	MPC · JPL
228017	2008 ES_{148}	—	March 2, 2008	Kitt Peak	Spacewatch	·	940 m	MPC · JPL
228018	2008 FO_{8}	—	March 25, 2008	Kitt Peak	Spacewatch	H	700 m	MPC · JPL
228019	2008 FC_{15}	—	March 26, 2008	Kitt Peak	Spacewatch	·	2.8 km	MPC · JPL
228020	2008 FQ_{15}	—	March 26, 2008	Kitt Peak	Spacewatch	·	2.1 km	MPC · JPL
228021	2008 FV_{15}	—	March 26, 2008	Kitt Peak	Spacewatch	JUN	1.5 km	MPC · JPL
228022	2008 FM_{54}	—	March 28, 2008	Mount Lemmon	Mount Lemmon Survey	·	920 m	MPC · JPL
228023	2008 FZ_{69}	—	March 28, 2008	Kitt Peak	Spacewatch	ADE	3.4 km	MPC · JPL
228024	2008 FQ_{71}	—	March 30, 2008	Kitt Peak	Spacewatch	ERI	1.9 km	MPC · JPL
228025	2008 FG_{73}	—	March 30, 2008	Kitt Peak	Spacewatch	·	1.5 km	MPC · JPL
228026	2008 FF_{94}	—	March 29, 2008	Kitt Peak	Spacewatch	·	890 m	MPC · JPL
228027	2008 FF_{96}	—	March 29, 2008	Mount Lemmon	Mount Lemmon Survey	·	2.6 km	MPC · JPL
228028	2008 FY_{117}	—	March 31, 2008	Kitt Peak	Spacewatch	·	1.3 km	MPC · JPL
228029 MANIAC	2008 GN	MANIAC	April 2, 2008	La Cañada	Lacruz, J.	·	1.4 km	MPC · JPL
228030	2008 GO_{1}	—	April 5, 2008	Catalina	CSS	H	740 m	MPC · JPL
228031	2008 GS_{1}	—	April 4, 2008	La Sagra	OAM	·	1.7 km	MPC · JPL
228032	2008 GS_{20}	—	April 3, 2008	Socorro	LINEAR	·	2.5 km	MPC · JPL
228033	2008 GZ_{40}	—	April 4, 2008	Kitt Peak	Spacewatch	·	1.6 km	MPC · JPL
228034	2008 GG_{45}	—	April 4, 2008	Catalina	CSS	·	1.4 km	MPC · JPL
228035	2008 GJ_{57}	—	April 5, 2008	Mount Lemmon	Mount Lemmon Survey	·	2.0 km	MPC · JPL
228036	2008 GO_{59}	—	April 5, 2008	Kitt Peak	Spacewatch	·	860 m	MPC · JPL
228037	2008 GQ_{68}	—	April 6, 2008	Kitt Peak	Spacewatch	·	2.4 km	MPC · JPL
228038	2008 GE_{79}	—	April 7, 2008	Kitt Peak	Spacewatch	·	2.4 km	MPC · JPL
228039	2008 GQ_{81}	—	April 7, 2008	Kitt Peak	Spacewatch	·	1.7 km	MPC · JPL
228040	2008 GX_{97}	—	April 8, 2008	Kitt Peak	Spacewatch	·	1.2 km	MPC · JPL
228041	2008 GO_{111}	—	April 7, 2008	Socorro	LINEAR	·	1.1 km	MPC · JPL
228042	2008 GW_{119}	—	April 11, 2008	Kitt Peak	Spacewatch	EUN	1.4 km	MPC · JPL
228043	2008 GQ_{138}	—	April 6, 2008	Kitt Peak	Spacewatch	·	980 m	MPC · JPL
228044	2008 HD_{5}	—	April 24, 2008	Kitt Peak	Spacewatch	·	1.2 km	MPC · JPL
228045	2008 HW_{12}	—	April 24, 2008	Kitt Peak	Spacewatch	·	6.3 km	MPC · JPL
228046	2008 HM_{18}	—	April 26, 2008	Kitt Peak	Spacewatch	RAF	1.3 km	MPC · JPL
228047	2008 HH_{21}	—	April 26, 2008	Kitt Peak	Spacewatch	H	630 m	MPC · JPL
228048	2008 HN_{21}	—	April 26, 2008	Kitt Peak	Spacewatch	·	860 m	MPC · JPL
228049	2008 HE_{31}	—	April 29, 2008	Kitt Peak	Spacewatch	·	1.5 km	MPC · JPL
228050	2008 HD_{34}	—	April 27, 2008	Kitt Peak	Spacewatch	PHO	1.2 km	MPC · JPL
228051	2008 HQ_{36}	—	April 30, 2008	Kitt Peak	Spacewatch	V	890 m	MPC · JPL
228052	2008 HZ_{41}	—	April 26, 2008	Mount Lemmon	Mount Lemmon Survey	·	780 m	MPC · JPL
228053	2008 HK_{67}	—	April 29, 2008	Kitt Peak	Spacewatch	·	1.8 km	MPC · JPL
228054	2008 HB_{70}	—	April 30, 2008	Catalina	CSS	·	900 m	MPC · JPL
228055	2008 JV_{9}	—	May 3, 2008	Kitt Peak	Spacewatch	·	1.9 km	MPC · JPL
228056	2008 JU_{11}	—	May 3, 2008	Kitt Peak	Spacewatch	·	1.2 km	MPC · JPL
228057	2008 JA_{20}	—	May 6, 2008	Vicques	M. Ory	MAS	920 m	MPC · JPL
228058	2008 JV_{24}	—	May 8, 2008	Socorro	LINEAR	·	1.2 km	MPC · JPL
228059	2008 JH_{34}	—	May 14, 2008	Catalina	CSS	EUN	1.7 km	MPC · JPL
228060	2008 KB	—	May 25, 2008	Vail-Jarnac	Jarnac	·	850 m	MPC · JPL
228061	2008 KR_{9}	—	May 27, 2008	Kitt Peak	Spacewatch	·	2.5 km	MPC · JPL
228062	2008 KZ_{23}	—	May 28, 2008	Kitt Peak	Spacewatch	·	2.2 km	MPC · JPL
228063	2008 LU	—	June 1, 2008	Mount Lemmon	Mount Lemmon Survey	·	1.5 km	MPC · JPL
228064	2008 LU_{7}	—	June 8, 2008	Needville	J. Dellinger	BRA	2.3 km	MPC · JPL
228065	2008 LF_{11}	—	June 6, 2008	Kitt Peak	Spacewatch	·	2.1 km	MPC · JPL
228066	2008 OM_{2}	—	July 26, 2008	La Sagra	OAM	·	2.0 km	MPC · JPL
228067	2008 OL_{7}	—	July 29, 2008	Mount Lemmon	Mount Lemmon Survey	EOS	3.3 km	MPC · JPL
228068	2008 OF_{8}	—	July 29, 2008	La Sagra	OAM	·	1.8 km	MPC · JPL
228069	2008 OF_{9}	—	July 29, 2008	La Sagra	OAM	·	3.5 km	MPC · JPL
228070	2008 OL_{20}	—	July 26, 2008	Siding Spring	SSS	·	3.8 km	MPC · JPL
228071	2008 OT_{22}	—	July 30, 2008	Kitt Peak	Spacewatch	L4	9.2 km	MPC · JPL
228072	2008 PP_{1}	—	August 3, 2008	Dauban	Kugel, F.	KOR	1.9 km	MPC · JPL
228073	2008 PT_{6}	—	August 4, 2008	La Sagra	OAM	·	4.3 km	MPC · JPL
228074	2008 PT_{7}	—	August 5, 2008	La Sagra	OAM	·	5.2 km	MPC · JPL
228075	2008 PE_{11}	—	August 7, 2008	Tiki	Teamo, N.	·	3.8 km	MPC · JPL
228076	2008 PJ_{15}	—	August 10, 2008	La Sagra	OAM	·	2.8 km	MPC · JPL
228077	2008 QD_{6}	—	August 25, 2008	Dauban	Kugel, F.	L4	10 km	MPC · JPL
228078 Cavalloni	2008 QY_{6}	Cavalloni	August 25, 2008	Piszkéstető	K. Sárneczky	·	2.0 km	MPC · JPL
228079	2008 QA_{17}	—	August 26, 2008	La Sagra	OAM	·	2.7 km	MPC · JPL
228080	2008 QS_{17}	—	August 27, 2008	La Sagra	OAM	·	3.4 km	MPC · JPL
228081	2008 QS_{28}	—	August 31, 2008	La Sagra	OAM	·	2.9 km	MPC · JPL
228082	2008 QK_{30}	—	August 30, 2008	Socorro	LINEAR	·	4.0 km	MPC · JPL
228083	2008 QO_{38}	—	August 24, 2008	Kitt Peak	Spacewatch	(16286)	2.6 km	MPC · JPL
228084	2008 RV_{3}	—	September 2, 2008	Kitt Peak	Spacewatch	L4	9.2 km	MPC · JPL
228085	2008 RT_{29}	—	September 2, 2008	Kitt Peak	Spacewatch	L4	10 km	MPC · JPL
228086	2008 RX_{78}	—	September 9, 2008	Bergisch Gladbach	W. Bickel	L4	10 km	MPC · JPL
228087	2008 RL_{100}	—	September 2, 2008	La Sagra	OAM	·	3.7 km	MPC · JPL
228088	2008 RM_{105}	—	September 6, 2008	Mount Lemmon	Mount Lemmon Survey	L4	9.8 km	MPC · JPL
228089	2008 RV_{126}	—	September 4, 2008	Kitt Peak	Spacewatch	L4	10 km	MPC · JPL
228090	2008 RE_{127}	—	September 5, 2008	Kitt Peak	Spacewatch	L4	11 km	MPC · JPL
228091	2008 SS_{2}	—	September 23, 2008	Hibiscus	Teamo, N.	·	4.5 km	MPC · JPL
228092	2008 SY_{6}	—	September 22, 2008	Socorro	LINEAR	·	3.2 km	MPC · JPL
228093	2008 SV_{9}	—	September 22, 2008	Socorro	LINEAR	3:2	7.3 km	MPC · JPL
228094	2008 SJ_{18}	—	September 19, 2008	Kitt Peak	Spacewatch	KOR	1.7 km	MPC · JPL
228095	2008 SF_{24}	—	September 19, 2008	Kitt Peak	Spacewatch	L4	10 km	MPC · JPL
228096	2008 SA_{27}	—	September 19, 2008	Kitt Peak	Spacewatch	L4	10 km	MPC · JPL
228097	2008 SQ_{31}	—	September 20, 2008	Kitt Peak	Spacewatch	L4 · (8060)	10 km	MPC · JPL
228098	2008 SM_{38}	—	September 20, 2008	Kitt Peak	Spacewatch	L4	10 km	MPC · JPL
228099	2008 SC_{51}	—	September 20, 2008	Mount Lemmon	Mount Lemmon Survey	L4	8.7 km	MPC · JPL
228100	2008 SM_{148}	—	September 28, 2008	Farra d'Isonzo	Farra d'Isonzo	·	3.4 km	MPC · JPL

== 228101–228200 ==
back to top

Designation			Discovery			Properties		Ref
Permanent	Provisional	Named after	Date	Site	Discoverer(s)	Category	Diam.	Ref
228101	2008 SP_{154}	—	September 22, 2008	Socorro	LINEAR	L4	10 km	MPC · JPL
228102	2008 SY_{172}	—	September 22, 2008	Catalina	CSS	L4	20 km	MPC · JPL
228103	2008 SA_{192}	—	September 25, 2008	Kitt Peak	Spacewatch	L4	10 km	MPC · JPL
228104	2008 SF_{197}	—	September 25, 2008	Kitt Peak	Spacewatch	L4	10 km	MPC · JPL
228105	2008 SA_{224}	—	September 26, 2008	Kitt Peak	Spacewatch	L4	10 km	MPC · JPL
228106	2008 SZ_{229}	—	September 28, 2008	Mount Lemmon	Mount Lemmon Survey	L4	15 km	MPC · JPL
228107	2008 SS_{231}	—	September 28, 2008	Mount Lemmon	Mount Lemmon Survey	L4	9.1 km	MPC · JPL
228108	2008 SU_{277}	—	September 25, 2008	Mount Lemmon	Mount Lemmon Survey	L4	10 km	MPC · JPL
228109	2008 TA_{5}	—	October 1, 2008	La Sagra	OAM	·	2.9 km	MPC · JPL
228110 Eudorus	2008 TC_{9}	Eudorus	October 7, 2008	Calvin-Rehoboth	L. A. Molnar	L4	10 km	MPC · JPL
228111	2008 TK_{10}	—	October 8, 2008	Desert Moon	Stevens, B. L.	L4	10 km	MPC · JPL
228112	2008 TG_{35}	—	October 1, 2008	Mount Lemmon	Mount Lemmon Survey	L4	10 km	MPC · JPL
228113	2008 TZ_{50}	—	October 2, 2008	Kitt Peak	Spacewatch	L4	10 km	MPC · JPL
228114	2008 TB_{61}	—	October 2, 2008	Catalina	CSS	L4	17 km	MPC · JPL
228115	2008 TK_{76}	—	October 2, 2008	Mount Lemmon	Mount Lemmon Survey	L4 · ERY	13 km	MPC · JPL
228116	2008 TK_{82}	—	October 3, 2008	La Sagra	OAM	L4 · ERY	13 km	MPC · JPL
228117	2008 TJ_{93}	—	October 5, 2008	La Sagra	OAM	L4	10 km	MPC · JPL
228118	2008 TZ_{111}	—	October 6, 2008	Catalina	CSS	L4	10 km	MPC · JPL
228119	2008 TM_{136}	—	October 8, 2008	Kitt Peak	Spacewatch	L4 · slow	10 km	MPC · JPL
228120	2008 TV_{139}	—	October 8, 2008	Mount Lemmon	Mount Lemmon Survey	L4	10 km	MPC · JPL
228121	2008 TN_{175}	—	October 9, 2008	Kitt Peak	Spacewatch	L4	8.3 km	MPC · JPL
228122	2008 UH_{11}	—	October 17, 2008	Kitt Peak	Spacewatch	L4	10 km	MPC · JPL
228123	2008 UH_{45}	—	October 20, 2008	Mount Lemmon	Mount Lemmon Survey	L4	9.1 km	MPC · JPL
228124	2008 YC_{7}	—	December 23, 2008	Calar Alto	F. Hormuth	L4	10 km	MPC · JPL
228125	2008 YV_{30}	—	December 31, 2008	Catalina	CSS	L4	17 km	MPC · JPL
228126	2009 ON_{1}	—	July 19, 2009	Siding Spring	SSS	T_{j} (2.92)	6.8 km	MPC · JPL
228127	2009 PL	—	August 11, 2009	Marly	P. Kocher	·	1.2 km	MPC · JPL
228128	2009 PN_{8}	—	August 15, 2009	Catalina	CSS	NYS	1.7 km	MPC · JPL
228129	2009 PL_{12}	—	August 15, 2009	Catalina	CSS	·	3.2 km	MPC · JPL
228130	2009 PE_{17}	—	August 15, 2009	Catalina	CSS	MAS	1.1 km	MPC · JPL
228131	2009 QE_{1}	—	August 16, 2009	La Sagra	OAM	·	2.5 km	MPC · JPL
228132	2009 QC_{13}	—	August 16, 2009	Kitt Peak	Spacewatch	·	1.6 km	MPC · JPL
228133 Ripoll	2009 QM_{22}	Ripoll	August 20, 2009	La Sagra	OAM	NYS	1.1 km	MPC · JPL
228134	2009 QG_{43}	—	August 27, 2009	La Sagra	OAM	·	3.5 km	MPC · JPL
228135 Sodnik	2009 RE_{4}	Sodnik	September 13, 2009	ESA OGS	Busch, M., Kresken, R.	AGN	1.3 km	MPC · JPL
228136 Billary	2009 RF_{4}	Billary	September 13, 2009	ESA OGS	Busch, M., Kresken, R.	·	1.0 km	MPC · JPL
228137	2009 RY_{32}	—	September 14, 2009	Kitt Peak	Spacewatch	KOR	1.3 km	MPC · JPL
228138	2009 RB_{33}	—	September 14, 2009	Kitt Peak	Spacewatch	V	790 m	MPC · JPL
228139	2009 RS_{33}	—	September 14, 2009	Kitt Peak	Spacewatch	·	2.1 km	MPC · JPL
228140	2009 RT_{33}	—	September 14, 2009	Kitt Peak	Spacewatch	L4	14 km	MPC · JPL
228141	2009 RM_{37}	—	September 15, 2009	Kitt Peak	Spacewatch	·	3.3 km	MPC · JPL
228142	2009 RZ_{45}	—	September 15, 2009	Kitt Peak	Spacewatch	·	1.3 km	MPC · JPL
228143	2009 RE_{50}	—	September 15, 2009	Kitt Peak	Spacewatch	·	2.8 km	MPC · JPL
228144	2009 RP_{50}	—	September 15, 2009	Kitt Peak	Spacewatch	·	2.6 km	MPC · JPL
228145	2009 RU_{51}	—	September 15, 2009	Kitt Peak	Spacewatch	·	830 m	MPC · JPL
228146	2009 RX_{55}	—	September 15, 2009	Kitt Peak	Spacewatch	NYS	1.2 km	MPC · JPL
228147 Miquelbarceló	2009 SB_{18}	Miquelbarceló	September 21, 2009	La Sagra	OAM	·	2.0 km	MPC · JPL
228148	2009 SH_{19}	—	September 22, 2009	Taunus	Karge, S., Zimmer, U.	L4	13 km	MPC · JPL
228149	2009 ST_{28}	—	September 16, 2009	Kitt Peak	Spacewatch	·	1.4 km	MPC · JPL
228150	2009 SJ_{38}	—	September 16, 2009	Kitt Peak	Spacewatch	L4	10 km	MPC · JPL
228151	2009 SU_{39}	—	September 16, 2009	Kitt Peak	Spacewatch	THM	3.4 km	MPC · JPL
228152	2009 SL_{44}	—	September 16, 2009	Kitt Peak	Spacewatch	·	1.8 km	MPC · JPL
228153	2009 SV_{48}	—	September 16, 2009	Kitt Peak	Spacewatch	·	3.7 km	MPC · JPL
228154	2009 SZ_{48}	—	September 16, 2009	Mount Lemmon	Mount Lemmon Survey	·	870 m	MPC · JPL
228155	2009 SF_{61}	—	September 17, 2009	Kitt Peak	Spacewatch	L4	16 km	MPC · JPL
228156	2009 SG_{69}	—	September 17, 2009	Kitt Peak	Spacewatch	LEO	2.0 km	MPC · JPL
228157	2009 SF_{88}	—	September 18, 2009	Kitt Peak	Spacewatch	·	6.5 km	MPC · JPL
228158 Mamankei	2009 SZ_{96}	Mamankei	September 19, 2009	XuYi	PMO NEO Survey Program	·	5.7 km	MPC · JPL
228159	2009 SQ_{114}	—	September 18, 2009	Kitt Peak	Spacewatch	·	1.5 km	MPC · JPL
228160	2009 SD_{138}	—	September 18, 2009	Kitt Peak	Spacewatch	MAS	780 m	MPC · JPL
228161	2009 SF_{138}	—	September 18, 2009	Kitt Peak	Spacewatch	·	1.8 km	MPC · JPL
228162	2009 SO_{141}	—	September 19, 2009	Kitt Peak	Spacewatch	L4	10 km	MPC · JPL
228163	2009 SN_{143}	—	September 19, 2009	Kitt Peak	Spacewatch	·	4.0 km	MPC · JPL
228164	2009 SY_{166}	—	September 22, 2009	Kitt Peak	Spacewatch	·	840 m	MPC · JPL
228165 Mezentsev	2009 SJ_{170}	Mezentsev	September 26, 2009	Tzec Maun	D. Chestnov, A. Novichonok	·	2.6 km	MPC · JPL
228166	2009 ST_{170}	—	September 23, 2009	Mount Lemmon	Mount Lemmon Survey	·	1.1 km	MPC · JPL
228167	2009 SQ_{186}	—	September 21, 2009	Kitt Peak	Spacewatch	·	3.3 km	MPC · JPL
228168	2009 SZ_{188}	—	September 21, 2009	Parc National des Cévennes	Lopez, J.-M.	·	960 m	MPC · JPL
228169	2009 SP_{204}	—	September 22, 2009	Kitt Peak	Spacewatch	·	4.8 km	MPC · JPL
228170	2009 SS_{205}	—	September 22, 2009	Kitt Peak	Spacewatch	·	1.4 km	MPC · JPL
228171	2009 SG_{211}	—	September 23, 2009	Kitt Peak	Spacewatch	·	1.4 km	MPC · JPL
228172	2009 SK_{212}	—	September 23, 2009	Kitt Peak	Spacewatch	·	1.9 km	MPC · JPL
228173	2009 SV_{232}	—	September 19, 2009	Catalina	CSS	·	4.9 km	MPC · JPL
228174	2009 SG_{233}	—	September 19, 2009	Catalina	CSS	·	3.7 km	MPC · JPL
228175	2009 SC_{234}	—	September 23, 2009	Mount Lemmon	Mount Lemmon Survey	·	1.4 km	MPC · JPL
228176	2009 SP_{263}	—	September 23, 2009	Mount Lemmon	Mount Lemmon Survey	·	1.4 km	MPC · JPL
228177	2009 SK_{275}	—	September 25, 2009	Kitt Peak	Spacewatch	·	3.1 km	MPC · JPL
228178	2009 SA_{285}	—	September 25, 2009	Mount Lemmon	Mount Lemmon Survey	·	1.9 km	MPC · JPL
228179	2009 TF_{4}	—	October 13, 2009	Mayhill	Lowe, A.	MAS	830 m	MPC · JPL
228180 Puertollano	2009 TE_{5}	Puertollano	October 11, 2009	La Sagra	OAM	·	880 m	MPC · JPL
228181	2009 TF_{9}	—	October 12, 2009	La Sagra	OAM	·	3.5 km	MPC · JPL
228182	2009 TQ_{16}	—	October 11, 2009	Mount Lemmon	Mount Lemmon Survey	NYS ·	2.2 km	MPC · JPL
228183	2009 TQ_{20}	—	October 11, 2009	La Sagra	OAM	·	2.1 km	MPC · JPL
228184	2009 TR_{20}	—	October 11, 2009	La Sagra	OAM	V	950 m	MPC · JPL
228185	2009 TD_{27}	—	October 14, 2009	La Sagra	OAM	·	1.5 km	MPC · JPL
228186	2009 TP_{31}	—	October 15, 2009	La Sagra	OAM	·	1.3 km	MPC · JPL
228187	2009 TQ_{35}	—	October 14, 2009	La Sagra	OAM	·	2.8 km	MPC · JPL
228188	2009 UA_{21}	—	October 22, 2009	Bisei SG Center	BATTeRS	·	2.0 km	MPC · JPL
228189	2009 UT_{36}	—	October 22, 2009	Mount Lemmon	Mount Lemmon Survey	·	1.0 km	MPC · JPL
228190	2009 UY_{38}	—	October 22, 2009	Mount Lemmon	Mount Lemmon Survey	·	3.4 km	MPC · JPL
228191	2009 UX_{72}	—	October 23, 2009	Kitt Peak	Spacewatch	WIT	1.4 km	MPC · JPL
228192	2009 UM_{82}	—	October 23, 2009	Mount Lemmon	Mount Lemmon Survey	(5)	1.8 km	MPC · JPL
228193	2693 P-L	—	September 24, 1960	Palomar	C. J. van Houten, I. van Houten-Groeneveld, T. Gehrels	·	4.8 km	MPC · JPL
228194	3046 P-L	—	September 24, 1960	Palomar	C. J. van Houten, I. van Houten-Groeneveld, T. Gehrels	·	2.2 km	MPC · JPL
228195	6675 P-L	—	September 24, 1960	Palomar	C. J. van Houten, I. van Houten-Groeneveld, T. Gehrels	·	1.6 km	MPC · JPL
228196	7574 P-L	—	October 17, 1960	Palomar	C. J. van Houten, I. van Houten-Groeneveld, T. Gehrels	·	4.3 km	MPC · JPL
228197	2149 T-3	—	October 16, 1977	Palomar	C. J. van Houten, I. van Houten-Groeneveld, T. Gehrels	·	3.7 km	MPC · JPL
228198	3200 T-3	—	October 16, 1977	Palomar	C. J. van Houten, I. van Houten-Groeneveld, T. Gehrels	·	1.4 km	MPC · JPL
228199	3765 T-3	—	October 16, 1977	Palomar	C. J. van Houten, I. van Houten-Groeneveld, T. Gehrels	·	4.8 km	MPC · JPL
228200	4088 T-3	—	October 16, 1977	Palomar	C. J. van Houten, I. van Houten-Groeneveld, T. Gehrels	·	3.5 km	MPC · JPL

== 228201–228300 ==
back to top

Designation			Discovery			Properties		Ref
Permanent	Provisional	Named after	Date	Site	Discoverer(s)	Category	Diam.	Ref
228201	4106 T-3	—	October 16, 1977	Palomar	C. J. van Houten, I. van Houten-Groeneveld, T. Gehrels	·	1.8 km	MPC · JPL
228202	5058 T-3	—	October 16, 1977	Palomar	C. J. van Houten, I. van Houten-Groeneveld, T. Gehrels	·	3.5 km	MPC · JPL
228203	5772 T-3	—	October 16, 1977	Palomar	C. J. van Houten, I. van Houten-Groeneveld, T. Gehrels	·	4.6 km	MPC · JPL
228204	1993 VM_{7}	—	November 10, 1993	Kitt Peak	Spacewatch	·	4.6 km	MPC · JPL
228205	1994 JP_{2}	—	May 1, 1994	Kitt Peak	Spacewatch	·	1.6 km	MPC · JPL
228206	1995 BY_{8}	—	January 29, 1995	Kitt Peak	Spacewatch	·	2.2 km	MPC · JPL
228207	1995 CM_{4}	—	February 1, 1995	Kitt Peak	Spacewatch	·	1.9 km	MPC · JPL
228208	1995 MR_{2}	—	June 24, 1995	Kitt Peak	Spacewatch	·	1.0 km	MPC · JPL
228209	1995 TF_{4}	—	October 15, 1995	Kitt Peak	Spacewatch	·	860 m	MPC · JPL
228210	1995 UT_{59}	—	October 19, 1995	Kitt Peak	Spacewatch	·	3.4 km	MPC · JPL
228211	1995 VR_{5}	—	November 14, 1995	Kitt Peak	Spacewatch	·	2.5 km	MPC · JPL
228212	1995 YG_{9}	—	December 18, 1995	Kitt Peak	Spacewatch	V	1.0 km	MPC · JPL
228213	1995 YG_{17}	—	December 22, 1995	Kitt Peak	Spacewatch	·	1.2 km	MPC · JPL
228214	1996 AO_{14}	—	January 12, 1996	Kitt Peak	Spacewatch	·	1.2 km	MPC · JPL
228215	1996 DD_{2}	—	February 26, 1996	Siding Spring	G. J. Garradd	·	1.1 km	MPC · JPL
228216	1996 LJ_{3}	—	June 11, 1996	Kitt Peak	Spacewatch	·	4.5 km	MPC · JPL
228217	1996 RU_{16}	—	September 13, 1996	Kitt Peak	Spacewatch	·	1.7 km	MPC · JPL
228218	1996 TJ_{17}	—	October 4, 1996	Kitt Peak	Spacewatch	VER	5.3 km	MPC · JPL
228219	1996 VG_{33}	—	November 5, 1996	Kitt Peak	Spacewatch	·	2.1 km	MPC · JPL
228220	1996 VB_{36}	—	November 10, 1996	Kitt Peak	Spacewatch	·	810 m	MPC · JPL
228221	1996 XO_{7}	—	December 1, 1996	Kitt Peak	Spacewatch	·	1.9 km	MPC · JPL
228222	1996 XG_{30}	—	December 14, 1996	Kitt Peak	Spacewatch	·	1.7 km	MPC · JPL
228223	1997 GS_{15}	—	April 3, 1997	Socorro	LINEAR	·	910 m	MPC · JPL
228224	1998 DK_{12}	—	February 23, 1998	Kitt Peak	Spacewatch	(5)	1.9 km	MPC · JPL
228225	1998 HM_{16}	—	April 24, 1998	Kitt Peak	Spacewatch	(11882)	2.4 km	MPC · JPL
228226	1998 HO_{19}	—	April 18, 1998	Socorro	LINEAR	·	2.0 km	MPC · JPL
228227	1998 HF_{25}	—	April 18, 1998	Kitt Peak	Spacewatch	·	2.8 km	MPC · JPL
228228	1998 HM_{80}	—	April 21, 1998	Socorro	LINEAR	·	1.9 km	MPC · JPL
228229	1998 MO_{17}	—	June 27, 1998	Mauna Kea	K. J. Meech	·	2.1 km	MPC · JPL
228230	1998 QL_{74}	—	August 24, 1998	Socorro	LINEAR	V	1.2 km	MPC · JPL
228231	1998 QT_{101}	—	August 26, 1998	La Silla	E. W. Elst	·	1.2 km	MPC · JPL
228232	1998 RX_{10}	—	September 13, 1998	Kitt Peak	Spacewatch	·	2.1 km	MPC · JPL
228233	1998 RG_{13}	—	September 14, 1998	Kitt Peak	Spacewatch	·	2.0 km	MPC · JPL
228234	1998 SC_{7}	—	September 20, 1998	Kitt Peak	Spacewatch	·	960 m	MPC · JPL
228235	1998 SS_{69}	—	September 19, 1998	Socorro	LINEAR	·	1.4 km	MPC · JPL
228236	1998 SO_{119}	—	September 26, 1998	Socorro	LINEAR	·	2.4 km	MPC · JPL
228237	1998 SB_{167}	—	September 25, 1998	Anderson Mesa	LONEOS	·	1.4 km	MPC · JPL
228238	1998 SB_{170}	—	September 19, 1998	Anderson Mesa	LONEOS	V	980 m	MPC · JPL
228239	1998 TK_{21}	—	October 13, 1998	Kitt Peak	Spacewatch	L4	10 km	MPC · JPL
228240	1998 TK_{26}	—	October 14, 1998	Kitt Peak	Spacewatch	·	2.0 km	MPC · JPL
228241	1998 UO_{11}	—	October 17, 1998	Kitt Peak	Spacewatch	NYS	1.1 km	MPC · JPL
228242	1998 UQ_{17}	—	October 18, 1998	Xinglong	SCAP	·	1.7 km	MPC · JPL
228243	1998 US_{17}	—	October 18, 1998	Xinglong	SCAP	·	1.3 km	MPC · JPL
228244	1998 UD_{42}	—	October 28, 1998	Socorro	LINEAR	·	2.1 km	MPC · JPL
228245	1998 VL_{48}	—	November 15, 1998	Kitt Peak	Spacewatch	·	1.7 km	MPC · JPL
228246	1998 WC_{46}	—	November 22, 1998	Kitt Peak	Spacewatch	·	6.1 km	MPC · JPL
228247	1998 XH_{10}	—	December 8, 1998	Caussols	ODAS	EMA	5.4 km	MPC · JPL
228248	1998 XD_{13}	—	December 15, 1998	Caussols	ODAS	·	4.1 km	MPC · JPL
228249	1998 XO_{35}	—	December 14, 1998	Socorro	LINEAR	·	5.5 km	MPC · JPL
228250	1998 YD_{20}	—	December 25, 1998	Kitt Peak	Spacewatch	THM	2.9 km	MPC · JPL
228251	1999 AY_{11}	—	January 7, 1999	Kitt Peak	Spacewatch	·	1.6 km	MPC · JPL
228252	1999 AO_{32}	—	January 15, 1999	Kitt Peak	Spacewatch	·	1.5 km	MPC · JPL
228253	1999 CT_{136}	—	February 9, 1999	Kitt Peak	Spacewatch	NYS	1.3 km	MPC · JPL
228254	1999 CL_{141}	—	February 10, 1999	Kitt Peak	Spacewatch	·	1.8 km	MPC · JPL
228255	1999 ET_{7}	—	March 12, 1999	Kitt Peak	Spacewatch	THM	3.0 km	MPC · JPL
228256	1999 EE_{12}	—	March 15, 1999	Socorro	LINEAR	·	2.1 km	MPC · JPL
228257	1999 JL_{111}	—	May 13, 1999	Socorro	LINEAR	·	1.7 km	MPC · JPL
228258	1999 NV_{56}	—	July 12, 1999	Socorro	LINEAR	·	4.1 km	MPC · JPL
228259	1999 PL_{3}	—	August 12, 1999	Eskridge	G. Hug	·	3.1 km	MPC · JPL
228260	1999 RM_{59}	—	September 7, 1999	Socorro	LINEAR	DOR	3.9 km	MPC · JPL
228261	1999 RJ_{82}	—	September 7, 1999	Socorro	LINEAR	·	1.1 km	MPC · JPL
228262	1999 TX_{67}	—	October 8, 1999	Kitt Peak	Spacewatch	AGN	1.8 km	MPC · JPL
228263	1999 TH_{128}	—	October 4, 1999	Socorro	LINEAR	·	1.3 km	MPC · JPL
228264	1999 TM_{130}	—	October 6, 1999	Socorro	LINEAR	·	1.7 km	MPC · JPL
228265	1999 TF_{174}	—	October 10, 1999	Socorro	LINEAR	·	890 m	MPC · JPL
228266	1999 TZ_{195}	—	October 12, 1999	Socorro	LINEAR	·	1.1 km	MPC · JPL
228267	1999 TC_{200}	—	October 12, 1999	Socorro	LINEAR	·	1.6 km	MPC · JPL
228268	1999 TR_{219}	—	October 1, 1999	Catalina	CSS	·	4.1 km	MPC · JPL
228269	1999 TO_{233}	—	October 3, 1999	Socorro	LINEAR	GEF	1.9 km	MPC · JPL
228270	1999 TT_{260}	—	October 12, 1999	Kitt Peak	Spacewatch	·	1.1 km	MPC · JPL
228271	1999 TG_{266}	—	October 3, 1999	Socorro	LINEAR	·	4.0 km	MPC · JPL
228272	1999 TM_{313}	—	October 6, 1999	Socorro	LINEAR	(13314)	2.2 km	MPC · JPL
228273	1999 UJ_{28}	—	October 30, 1999	Kitt Peak	Spacewatch	BRA	1.8 km	MPC · JPL
228274	1999 UV_{43}	—	October 29, 1999	Catalina	CSS	·	2.7 km	MPC · JPL
228275	1999 VG_{57}	—	November 4, 1999	Socorro	LINEAR	EOS	3.0 km	MPC · JPL
228276	1999 VB_{65}	—	November 4, 1999	Socorro	LINEAR	·	3.1 km	MPC · JPL
228277	1999 VD_{108}	—	November 9, 1999	Socorro	LINEAR	·	3.2 km	MPC · JPL
228278	1999 WJ_{11}	—	November 30, 1999	Kitt Peak	Spacewatch	·	1.0 km	MPC · JPL
228279	1999 WS_{27}	—	November 30, 1999	Kitt Peak	Spacewatch	·	3.3 km	MPC · JPL
228280	1999 XK_{48}	—	December 7, 1999	Socorro	LINEAR	·	4.0 km	MPC · JPL
228281	1999 XA_{118}	—	December 5, 1999	Catalina	CSS	·	1.0 km	MPC · JPL
228282	1999 XH_{149}	—	December 8, 1999	Kitt Peak	Spacewatch	·	2.9 km	MPC · JPL
228283	2000 AO_{60}	—	January 4, 2000	Socorro	LINEAR	·	1.1 km	MPC · JPL
228284	2000 AJ_{176}	—	January 7, 2000	Socorro	LINEAR	·	3.8 km	MPC · JPL
228285	2000 AW_{179}	—	January 7, 2000	Socorro	LINEAR	PHO	1.8 km	MPC · JPL
228286	2000 BZ_{1}	—	January 27, 2000	Kitt Peak	Spacewatch	·	2.5 km	MPC · JPL
228287	2000 BE_{3}	—	January 26, 2000	Višnjan	K. Korlević	·	5.6 km	MPC · JPL
228288	2000 BZ_{33}	—	January 30, 2000	Catalina	CSS	·	4.2 km	MPC · JPL
228289	2000 BG_{34}	—	January 30, 2000	Catalina	CSS	·	1 km	MPC · JPL
228290	2000 CS_{69}	—	February 1, 2000	Kitt Peak	Spacewatch	L4	8.0 km	MPC · JPL
228291	2000 CX_{95}	—	February 10, 2000	Kitt Peak	Spacewatch	·	860 m	MPC · JPL
228292	2000 DS_{10}	—	February 26, 2000	Kitt Peak	Spacewatch	·	3.8 km	MPC · JPL
228293	2000 DK_{14}	—	February 28, 2000	Kitt Peak	Spacewatch	·	3.6 km	MPC · JPL
228294	2000 DT_{52}	—	February 29, 2000	Socorro	LINEAR	·	1.1 km	MPC · JPL
228295	2000 DV_{60}	—	February 29, 2000	Socorro	LINEAR	MAS	870 m	MPC · JPL
228296	2000 DD_{95}	—	February 28, 2000	Socorro	LINEAR	·	1.4 km	MPC · JPL
228297	2000 DO_{100}	—	February 29, 2000	Socorro	LINEAR	·	1.3 km	MPC · JPL
228298	2000 EX_{4}	—	March 2, 2000	Kitt Peak	Spacewatch	·	820 m	MPC · JPL
228299	2000 EX_{23}	—	March 8, 2000	Kitt Peak	Spacewatch	NYS	1.1 km	MPC · JPL
228300	2000 EH_{52}	—	March 3, 2000	Kitt Peak	Spacewatch	·	4.7 km	MPC · JPL

== 228301–228400 ==
back to top

Designation			Discovery			Properties		Ref
Permanent	Provisional	Named after	Date	Site	Discoverer(s)	Category	Diam.	Ref
228301	2000 EA_{54}	—	March 9, 2000	Kitt Peak	Spacewatch	·	3.2 km	MPC · JPL
228302	2000 EO_{57}	—	March 8, 2000	Socorro	LINEAR	·	3.3 km	MPC · JPL
228303	2000 GT_{36}	—	April 5, 2000	Socorro	LINEAR	·	1.7 km	MPC · JPL
228304	2000 GE_{41}	—	April 5, 2000	Socorro	LINEAR	·	3.2 km	MPC · JPL
228305	2000 GY_{128}	—	April 5, 2000	Kitt Peak	Spacewatch	·	1.6 km	MPC · JPL
228306	2000 HT_{78}	—	April 28, 2000	Anderson Mesa	LONEOS	·	5.2 km	MPC · JPL
228307	2000 HB_{94}	—	April 29, 2000	Kitt Peak	Spacewatch	·	1.6 km	MPC · JPL
228308	2000 HE_{98}	—	April 27, 2000	Kitt Peak	Spacewatch	NYS	1.3 km	MPC · JPL
228309	2000 JA_{43}	—	May 7, 2000	Socorro	LINEAR	·	2.0 km	MPC · JPL
228310	2000 JV_{44}	—	May 7, 2000	Socorro	LINEAR	·	1.9 km	MPC · JPL
228311	2000 LB_{31}	—	June 6, 2000	Anderson Mesa	LONEOS	·	2.3 km	MPC · JPL
228312	2000 OS_{8}	—	July 23, 2000	Socorro	LINEAR	H	1.1 km	MPC · JPL
228313	2000 OB_{28}	—	July 24, 2000	Socorro	LINEAR	·	2.1 km	MPC · JPL
228314	2000 OA_{41}	—	July 30, 2000	Socorro	LINEAR	·	2.6 km	MPC · JPL
228315	2000 QX_{22}	—	August 25, 2000	Socorro	LINEAR	·	1.7 km	MPC · JPL
228316	2000 QE_{32}	—	August 26, 2000	Socorro	LINEAR	·	2.4 km	MPC · JPL
228317	2000 QE_{58}	—	August 26, 2000	Socorro	LINEAR	·	2.1 km	MPC · JPL
228318	2000 QF_{82}	—	August 24, 2000	Socorro	LINEAR	·	5.3 km	MPC · JPL
228319	2000 QC_{104}	—	August 28, 2000	Socorro	LINEAR	·	2.5 km	MPC · JPL
228320	2000 QO_{105}	—	August 28, 2000	Socorro	LINEAR	·	2.1 km	MPC · JPL
228321	2000 QQ_{130}	—	August 31, 2000	Prescott	P. G. Comba	(5)	1.4 km	MPC · JPL
228322	2000 QU_{203}	—	August 29, 2000	Socorro	LINEAR	·	2.6 km	MPC · JPL
228323	2000 QP_{204}	—	August 31, 2000	Socorro	LINEAR	·	2.2 km	MPC · JPL
228324	2000 QK_{212}	—	August 31, 2000	Socorro	LINEAR	(5)	1.4 km	MPC · JPL
228325	2000 QS_{224}	—	August 26, 2000	Haleakala	NEAT	EUN	2.3 km	MPC · JPL
228326	2000 QK_{243}	—	August 20, 2000	Kitt Peak	Spacewatch	(5)	1.5 km	MPC · JPL
228327	2000 RN_{18}	—	September 1, 2000	Socorro	LINEAR	·	2.6 km	MPC · JPL
228328	2000 RO_{19}	—	September 1, 2000	Socorro	LINEAR	slow	3.2 km	MPC · JPL
228329	2000 RC_{21}	—	September 1, 2000	Socorro	LINEAR	·	1.6 km	MPC · JPL
228330	2000 RQ_{34}	—	September 1, 2000	Socorro	LINEAR	·	2.4 km	MPC · JPL
228331	2000 RD_{86}	—	September 2, 2000	Socorro	LINEAR	·	2.4 km	MPC · JPL
228332	2000 RL_{99}	—	September 5, 2000	Anderson Mesa	LONEOS	(1547)	2.4 km	MPC · JPL
228333	2000 SW_{19}	—	September 23, 2000	Socorro	LINEAR	·	2.0 km	MPC · JPL
228334	2000 SK_{28}	—	September 23, 2000	Socorro	LINEAR	EUN	2.0 km	MPC · JPL
228335	2000 SW_{64}	—	September 24, 2000	Socorro	LINEAR	·	2.7 km	MPC · JPL
228336	2000 SE_{76}	—	September 24, 2000	Socorro	LINEAR	·	2.0 km	MPC · JPL
228337	2000 SS_{76}	—	September 24, 2000	Socorro	LINEAR	·	3.0 km	MPC · JPL
228338	2000 SZ_{98}	—	September 23, 2000	Socorro	LINEAR	·	2.2 km	MPC · JPL
228339	2000 SL_{100}	—	September 23, 2000	Socorro	LINEAR	·	2.4 km	MPC · JPL
228340	2000 SS_{129}	—	September 22, 2000	Socorro	LINEAR	·	1.5 km	MPC · JPL
228341	2000 SK_{136}	—	September 23, 2000	Socorro	LINEAR	·	2.7 km	MPC · JPL
228342	2000 SN_{136}	—	September 23, 2000	Socorro	LINEAR	BRG	2.0 km	MPC · JPL
228343	2000 SN_{139}	—	September 23, 2000	Socorro	LINEAR	·	3.4 km	MPC · JPL
228344	2000 SN_{145}	—	September 24, 2000	Socorro	LINEAR	(5)	2.0 km	MPC · JPL
228345	2000 SG_{180}	—	September 28, 2000	Socorro	LINEAR	EUN	1.9 km	MPC · JPL
228346	2000 SG_{184}	—	September 20, 2000	Haleakala	NEAT	·	2.3 km	MPC · JPL
228347	2000 SK_{198}	—	September 24, 2000	Socorro	LINEAR	(5)	1.9 km	MPC · JPL
228348	2000 SY_{224}	—	September 27, 2000	Socorro	LINEAR	EUN	2.3 km	MPC · JPL
228349	2000 SU_{278}	—	September 30, 2000	Socorro	LINEAR	·	2.6 km	MPC · JPL
228350	2000 SV_{282}	—	September 23, 2000	Socorro	LINEAR	·	2.4 km	MPC · JPL
228351	2000 SK_{290}	—	September 27, 2000	Socorro	LINEAR	·	1.4 km	MPC · JPL
228352	2000 SX_{303}	—	September 28, 2000	Socorro	LINEAR	·	2.6 km	MPC · JPL
228353	2000 SL_{306}	—	September 30, 2000	Socorro	LINEAR	·	3.5 km	MPC · JPL
228354	2000 SD_{315}	—	September 28, 2000	Socorro	LINEAR	·	2.8 km	MPC · JPL
228355	2000 SU_{316}	—	September 30, 2000	Socorro	LINEAR	·	3.7 km	MPC · JPL
228356	2000 TN_{14}	—	October 1, 2000	Socorro	LINEAR	·	1.3 km	MPC · JPL
228357	2000 TC_{22}	—	October 3, 2000	Socorro	LINEAR	·	2.9 km	MPC · JPL
228358	2000 TL_{65}	—	October 1, 2000	Socorro	LINEAR	(5)	1.4 km	MPC · JPL
228359	2000 TZ_{66}	—	October 2, 2000	Socorro	LINEAR	(5)	1.9 km	MPC · JPL
228360	2000 UA_{3}	—	October 23, 2000	Črni Vrh	Črni Vrh	·	3.0 km	MPC · JPL
228361	2000 UQ_{22}	—	October 24, 2000	Socorro	LINEAR	·	1.9 km	MPC · JPL
228362	2000 UA_{73}	—	October 25, 2000	Socorro	LINEAR	·	3.5 km	MPC · JPL
228363	2000 UD_{88}	—	October 31, 2000	Socorro	LINEAR	·	3.0 km	MPC · JPL
228364	2000 VH_{22}	—	November 1, 2000	Socorro	LINEAR	·	2.1 km	MPC · JPL
228365	2000 VB_{56}	—	November 3, 2000	Socorro	LINEAR	·	2.8 km	MPC · JPL
228366	2000 VO_{62}	—	November 2, 2000	Socorro	LINEAR	·	1.9 km	MPC · JPL
228367	2000 VS_{64}	—	November 1, 2000	Socorro	LINEAR	·	2.7 km	MPC · JPL
228368	2000 WK_{10}	—	November 19, 2000	Socorro	LINEAR	APO · PHA	670 m	MPC · JPL
228369	2000 WQ_{12}	—	November 22, 2000	Haleakala	NEAT	·	2.8 km	MPC · JPL
228370	2000 WJ_{27}	—	November 23, 2000	Kitt Peak	Spacewatch	·	3.2 km	MPC · JPL
228371	2000 WB_{46}	—	November 21, 2000	Socorro	LINEAR	·	2.4 km	MPC · JPL
228372	2000 WB_{52}	—	November 27, 2000	Kitt Peak	Spacewatch	·	2.5 km	MPC · JPL
228373	2000 WG_{62}	—	November 23, 2000	Haleakala	NEAT	·	2.9 km	MPC · JPL
228374	2000 WU_{66}	—	November 21, 2000	Socorro	LINEAR	·	3.1 km	MPC · JPL
228375	2000 WH_{70}	—	November 19, 2000	Socorro	LINEAR	·	2.4 km	MPC · JPL
228376	2000 WJ_{71}	—	November 19, 2000	Socorro	LINEAR	·	3.2 km	MPC · JPL
228377	2000 WM_{71}	—	November 19, 2000	Socorro	LINEAR	EUN	3.3 km	MPC · JPL
228378	2000 WN_{71}	—	November 19, 2000	Socorro	LINEAR	HNS	2.8 km	MPC · JPL
228379	2000 WN_{82}	—	November 20, 2000	Socorro	LINEAR	·	2.0 km	MPC · JPL
228380	2000 WH_{85}	—	November 20, 2000	Socorro	LINEAR	·	1.9 km	MPC · JPL
228381	2000 WM_{133}	—	November 19, 2000	Socorro	LINEAR	·	2.9 km	MPC · JPL
228382	2000 WC_{149}	—	November 29, 2000	Haleakala	NEAT	ADE	3.8 km	MPC · JPL
228383	2000 WO_{187}	—	November 16, 2000	Anderson Mesa	LONEOS	·	3.1 km	MPC · JPL
228384	2000 XD_{14}	—	December 4, 2000	Bohyunsan	Jeon, Y.-B., Lee, B.-C.	(17392)	2.2 km	MPC · JPL
228385	2000 XW_{20}	—	December 4, 2000	Socorro	LINEAR	·	2.3 km	MPC · JPL
228386	2000 YW_{19}	—	December 22, 2000	Haleakala	NEAT	·	2.0 km	MPC · JPL
228387	2000 YY_{35}	—	December 30, 2000	Socorro	LINEAR	·	5.2 km	MPC · JPL
228388	2000 YM_{60}	—	December 30, 2000	Socorro	LINEAR	·	3.2 km	MPC · JPL
228389	2000 YV_{106}	—	December 30, 2000	Socorro	LINEAR	·	1.7 km	MPC · JPL
228390	2000 YW_{112}	—	December 30, 2000	Socorro	LINEAR	GEF	2.7 km	MPC · JPL
228391	2000 YT_{127}	—	December 29, 2000	Haleakala	NEAT	·	3.0 km	MPC · JPL
228392	2001 AG_{26}	—	January 5, 2001	Socorro	LINEAR	·	2.5 km	MPC · JPL
228393	2001 AX_{47}	—	January 15, 2001	Socorro	LINEAR	·	3.0 km	MPC · JPL
228394	2001 BO_{18}	—	January 19, 2001	Socorro	LINEAR	·	2.9 km	MPC · JPL
228395	2001 BC_{27}	—	January 20, 2001	Socorro	LINEAR	·	2.2 km	MPC · JPL
228396	2001 BO_{29}	—	January 20, 2001	Socorro	LINEAR	·	1.7 km	MPC · JPL
228397	2001 CK_{21}	—	February 1, 2001	Anderson Mesa	LONEOS	·	2.4 km	MPC · JPL
228398	2001 CT_{21}	—	February 1, 2001	Anderson Mesa	LONEOS	·	1.9 km	MPC · JPL
228399	2001 CM_{46}	—	February 15, 2001	La Palma	La Palma	·	2.5 km	MPC · JPL
228400	2001 DK_{76}	—	February 20, 2001	Socorro	LINEAR	·	3.4 km	MPC · JPL

== 228401–228500 ==
back to top

Designation			Discovery			Properties		Ref
Permanent	Provisional	Named after	Date	Site	Discoverer(s)	Category	Diam.	Ref
228401	2001 DY_{80}	—	February 22, 2001	Nogales	Tenagra II	·	3.8 km	MPC · JPL
228402	2001 EP_{1}	—	March 1, 2001	Socorro	LINEAR	·	3.4 km	MPC · JPL
228403	2001 EA_{3}	—	March 3, 2001	Kitt Peak	Spacewatch	·	5.3 km	MPC · JPL
228404	2001 EQ_{17}	—	March 15, 2001	Socorro	LINEAR	·	1.2 km	MPC · JPL
228405	2001 FL_{2}	—	March 18, 2001	Socorro	LINEAR	·	4.3 km	MPC · JPL
228406	2001 FH_{139}	—	March 21, 2001	Haleakala	NEAT	KOR	2.0 km	MPC · JPL
228407	2001 FF_{146}	—	March 24, 2001	Anderson Mesa	LONEOS	EOS	3.3 km	MPC · JPL
228408	2001 FT_{157}	—	March 27, 2001	Anderson Mesa	LONEOS	·	2.8 km	MPC · JPL
228409 Bobjensen	2001 FM_{184}	Bobjensen	March 26, 2001	Kitt Peak	M. W. Buie	·	5.0 km	MPC · JPL
228410	2001 HS_{58}	—	April 25, 2001	Haleakala	NEAT	·	1.2 km	MPC · JPL
228411	2001 KQ_{53}	—	May 18, 2001	Haleakala	NEAT	HYG	3.8 km	MPC · JPL
228412	2001 KD_{79}	—	May 29, 2001	Socorro	LINEAR	·	2.4 km	MPC · JPL
228413	2001 LU_{17}	—	June 14, 2001	Palomar	NEAT	·	3.4 km	MPC · JPL
228414	2001 MR_{21}	—	June 28, 2001	Palomar	NEAT	NYS	1.2 km	MPC · JPL
228415	2001 NV_{4}	—	July 13, 2001	Palomar	NEAT	·	5.0 km	MPC · JPL
228416	2001 OJ_{57}	—	July 16, 2001	Anderson Mesa	LONEOS	·	2.7 km	MPC · JPL
228417	2001 OU_{59}	—	July 21, 2001	Haleakala	NEAT	·	3.8 km	MPC · JPL
228418	2001 OA_{64}	—	July 23, 2001	Haleakala	NEAT	·	2.1 km	MPC · JPL
228419	2001 OV_{65}	—	July 22, 2001	Socorro	LINEAR	·	2.6 km	MPC · JPL
228420	2001 ON_{80}	—	July 29, 2001	Palomar	NEAT	·	1.8 km	MPC · JPL
228421	2001 OL_{97}	—	July 25, 2001	Haleakala	NEAT	·	2.3 km	MPC · JPL
228422	2001 OO_{111}	—	July 27, 2001	Anderson Mesa	LONEOS	·	7.1 km	MPC · JPL
228423	2001 PB_{19}	—	August 10, 2001	Palomar	NEAT	·	1.9 km	MPC · JPL
228424	2001 PH_{22}	—	August 10, 2001	Haleakala	NEAT	NYS	1.4 km	MPC · JPL
228425	2001 PU_{28}	—	August 15, 2001	Reedy Creek	J. Broughton	·	1.8 km	MPC · JPL
228426	2001 PC_{30}	—	August 10, 2001	Palomar	NEAT	·	1.5 km	MPC · JPL
228427	2001 PQ_{46}	—	August 13, 2001	Palomar	NEAT	·	2.8 km	MPC · JPL
228428	2001 PE_{52}	—	August 15, 2001	Haleakala	NEAT	·	1.4 km	MPC · JPL
228429	2001 PV_{53}	—	August 14, 2001	Haleakala	NEAT	·	1.3 km	MPC · JPL
228430	2001 PC_{62}	—	August 13, 2001	Haleakala	NEAT	V	1.2 km	MPC · JPL
228431	2001 QZ	—	August 16, 2001	Socorro	LINEAR	·	1.4 km	MPC · JPL
228432	2001 QD_{38}	—	August 16, 2001	Socorro	LINEAR	NYS	1.5 km	MPC · JPL
228433	2001 QN_{41}	—	August 16, 2001	Socorro	LINEAR	·	1.3 km	MPC · JPL
228434	2001 QQ_{45}	—	August 16, 2001	Socorro	LINEAR	·	1.2 km	MPC · JPL
228435	2001 QR_{59}	—	August 18, 2001	Socorro	LINEAR	·	2.1 km	MPC · JPL
228436	2001 QH_{71}	—	August 16, 2001	Palomar	NEAT	H	560 m	MPC · JPL
228437	2001 QV_{86}	—	August 17, 2001	Palomar	NEAT	·	2.0 km	MPC · JPL
228438	2001 QC_{133}	—	August 21, 2001	Socorro	LINEAR	·	1.9 km	MPC · JPL
228439	2001 QA_{147}	—	August 20, 2001	Palomar	NEAT	·	1.7 km	MPC · JPL
228440	2001 QK_{149}	—	August 22, 2001	Haleakala	NEAT	NYS	2.4 km	MPC · JPL
228441	2001 QK_{157}	—	August 23, 2001	Anderson Mesa	LONEOS	NYS	1.7 km	MPC · JPL
228442	2001 QJ_{159}	—	August 23, 2001	Anderson Mesa	LONEOS	MAS	1 km	MPC · JPL
228443	2001 QB_{162}	—	August 23, 2001	Anderson Mesa	LONEOS	MAS	950 m	MPC · JPL
228444	2001 QT_{165}	—	August 24, 2001	Haleakala	NEAT	·	1.1 km	MPC · JPL
228445	2001 QH_{167}	—	August 24, 2001	Haleakala	NEAT	·	1.2 km	MPC · JPL
228446	2001 QJ_{167}	—	August 24, 2001	Haleakala	NEAT	MAS	1.0 km	MPC · JPL
228447	2001 QK_{172}	—	August 25, 2001	Socorro	LINEAR	V	1.1 km	MPC · JPL
228448	2001 QA_{174}	—	August 26, 2001	Socorro	LINEAR	·	2.3 km	MPC · JPL
228449	2001 QF_{179}	—	August 28, 2001	Palomar	NEAT	·	2.2 km	MPC · JPL
228450	2001 QH_{195}	—	August 22, 2001	Haleakala	NEAT	NYS	1.3 km	MPC · JPL
228451	2001 QF_{210}	—	August 23, 2001	Desert Eagle	W. K. Y. Yeung	·	3.0 km	MPC · JPL
228452	2001 QA_{217}	—	August 23, 2001	Anderson Mesa	LONEOS	NYS	1.5 km	MPC · JPL
228453	2001 QC_{217}	—	August 23, 2001	Anderson Mesa	LONEOS	·	1.5 km	MPC · JPL
228454	2001 QY_{245}	—	August 24, 2001	Socorro	LINEAR	·	2.0 km	MPC · JPL
228455	2001 QE_{252}	—	August 25, 2001	Socorro	LINEAR	·	1.4 km	MPC · JPL
228456	2001 QF_{258}	—	August 25, 2001	Socorro	LINEAR	·	1.9 km	MPC · JPL
228457	2001 QB_{275}	—	August 19, 2001	Socorro	LINEAR	·	1.7 km	MPC · JPL
228458	2001 QC_{275}	—	August 19, 2001	Socorro	LINEAR	·	1.2 km	MPC · JPL
228459	2001 QN_{323}	—	August 27, 2001	Palomar	NEAT	V	930 m	MPC · JPL
228460	2001 RH_{1}	—	September 7, 2001	Socorro	LINEAR	MAS	960 m	MPC · JPL
228461	2001 RN_{24}	—	September 7, 2001	Socorro	LINEAR	NYS	1.8 km	MPC · JPL
228462	2001 RJ_{28}	—	September 7, 2001	Socorro	LINEAR	·	1.4 km	MPC · JPL
228463	2001 RR_{46}	—	September 11, 2001	Socorro	LINEAR	H	790 m	MPC · JPL
228464	2001 RY_{52}	—	September 12, 2001	Socorro	LINEAR	MAS	830 m	MPC · JPL
228465	2001 RV_{55}	—	September 12, 2001	Socorro	LINEAR	·	1.8 km	MPC · JPL
228466	2001 RF_{83}	—	September 11, 2001	Anderson Mesa	LONEOS	·	1.8 km	MPC · JPL
228467	2001 RT_{90}	—	September 11, 2001	Anderson Mesa	LONEOS	NYS ·	2.6 km	MPC · JPL
228468	2001 RB_{113}	—	September 12, 2001	Socorro	LINEAR	NYS	1.3 km	MPC · JPL
228469	2001 RN_{153}	—	September 12, 2001	Socorro	LINEAR	·	1.6 km	MPC · JPL
228470	2001 SK_{2}	—	September 17, 2001	Desert Eagle	W. K. Y. Yeung	NYS	1.4 km	MPC · JPL
228471	2001 SU_{19}	—	September 16, 2001	Socorro	LINEAR	MAS	970 m	MPC · JPL
228472	2001 SC_{27}	—	September 16, 2001	Socorro	LINEAR	·	1.4 km	MPC · JPL
228473	2001 SX_{37}	—	September 16, 2001	Socorro	LINEAR	NYS	1.5 km	MPC · JPL
228474	2001 SZ_{46}	—	September 16, 2001	Socorro	LINEAR	·	1.5 km	MPC · JPL
228475	2001 SM_{49}	—	September 16, 2001	Socorro	LINEAR	·	1.7 km	MPC · JPL
228476	2001 SU_{50}	—	September 16, 2001	Socorro	LINEAR	·	1.7 km	MPC · JPL
228477	2001 SK_{52}	—	September 16, 2001	Socorro	LINEAR	·	1.9 km	MPC · JPL
228478	2001 SS_{73}	—	September 20, 2001	Desert Eagle	W. K. Y. Yeung	·	2.2 km	MPC · JPL
228479	2001 SR_{74}	—	September 19, 2001	Anderson Mesa	LONEOS	·	2.6 km	MPC · JPL
228480	2001 SR_{76}	—	September 16, 2001	Socorro	LINEAR	·	1.4 km	MPC · JPL
228481	2001 SB_{78}	—	September 19, 2001	Socorro	LINEAR	·	1.4 km	MPC · JPL
228482	2001 SF_{90}	—	September 20, 2001	Socorro	LINEAR	MAS	930 m	MPC · JPL
228483	2001 SL_{109}	—	September 20, 2001	Socorro	LINEAR	SUL	4.2 km	MPC · JPL
228484	2001 SX_{120}	—	September 16, 2001	Socorro	LINEAR	·	1.9 km	MPC · JPL
228485	2001 SC_{128}	—	September 16, 2001	Socorro	LINEAR	·	1.5 km	MPC · JPL
228486	2001 SH_{166}	—	September 19, 2001	Socorro	LINEAR	MAS	820 m	MPC · JPL
228487	2001 SL_{171}	—	September 16, 2001	Socorro	LINEAR	NYS	1.2 km	MPC · JPL
228488	2001 SD_{172}	—	September 16, 2001	Socorro	LINEAR	MAS	1.1 km	MPC · JPL
228489	2001 SW_{210}	—	September 19, 2001	Socorro	LINEAR	NYS	1.6 km	MPC · JPL
228490	2001 SL_{211}	—	September 19, 2001	Socorro	LINEAR	fast	1.3 km	MPC · JPL
228491	2001 SU_{228}	—	September 19, 2001	Socorro	LINEAR	MAS	990 m	MPC · JPL
228492	2001 ST_{233}	—	September 19, 2001	Socorro	LINEAR	·	1.8 km	MPC · JPL
228493	2001 SL_{241}	—	September 19, 2001	Socorro	LINEAR	·	2.0 km	MPC · JPL
228494	2001 SV_{252}	—	September 19, 2001	Socorro	LINEAR	V	1.3 km	MPC · JPL
228495	2001 SA_{266}	—	September 25, 2001	Desert Eagle	W. K. Y. Yeung	EUN	1.4 km	MPC · JPL
228496	2001 SA_{282}	—	September 22, 2001	Anderson Mesa	LONEOS	·	2.5 km	MPC · JPL
228497	2001 SR_{285}	—	September 22, 2001	Kitt Peak	Spacewatch	·	1.5 km	MPC · JPL
228498	2001 SO_{286}	—	September 21, 2001	Palomar	NEAT	·	2.2 km	MPC · JPL
228499	2001 SS_{288}	—	September 28, 2001	Palomar	NEAT	·	1.6 km	MPC · JPL
228500	2001 SU_{289}	—	September 29, 2001	Palomar	NEAT	·	2.6 km	MPC · JPL

== 228501–228600 ==
back to top

Designation			Discovery			Properties		Ref
Permanent	Provisional	Named after	Date	Site	Discoverer(s)	Category	Diam.	Ref
228501	2001 SW_{347}	—	September 26, 2001	Socorro	LINEAR	·	2.0 km	MPC · JPL
228502	2001 TE_{2}	—	October 12, 2001	Haleakala	NEAT	APO	300 m	MPC · JPL
228503	2001 TX_{7}	—	October 11, 2001	Desert Eagle	W. K. Y. Yeung	NYS	1.8 km	MPC · JPL
228504	2001 TG_{16}	—	October 11, 2001	Socorro	LINEAR	·	2.0 km	MPC · JPL
228505	2001 TF_{21}	—	October 9, 2001	Socorro	LINEAR	H	990 m	MPC · JPL
228506	2001 TM_{27}	—	October 14, 2001	Socorro	LINEAR	·	1.4 km	MPC · JPL
228507	2001 TV_{36}	—	October 14, 2001	Socorro	LINEAR	·	2.0 km	MPC · JPL
228508	2001 TS_{52}	—	October 13, 2001	Socorro	LINEAR	NYS	1.4 km	MPC · JPL
228509	2001 TP_{54}	—	October 14, 2001	Socorro	LINEAR	·	2.8 km	MPC · JPL
228510	2001 TU_{91}	—	October 14, 2001	Socorro	LINEAR	NYS	1.6 km	MPC · JPL
228511	2001 TZ_{93}	—	October 14, 2001	Socorro	LINEAR	·	1.5 km	MPC · JPL
228512	2001 TH_{104}	—	October 15, 2001	Desert Eagle	W. K. Y. Yeung	EUN	1.4 km	MPC · JPL
228513	2001 TL_{127}	—	October 13, 2001	Palomar	NEAT	·	2.9 km	MPC · JPL
228514	2001 TL_{140}	—	October 10, 2001	Palomar	NEAT	·	2.0 km	MPC · JPL
228515	2001 TA_{193}	—	October 14, 2001	Socorro	LINEAR	·	1.7 km	MPC · JPL
228516	2001 TN_{196}	—	October 14, 2001	Haleakala	NEAT	H	800 m	MPC · JPL
228517	2001 TX_{217}	—	October 14, 2001	Socorro	LINEAR	·	1.9 km	MPC · JPL
228518	2001 TC_{233}	—	October 15, 2001	Palomar	NEAT	V	920 m	MPC · JPL
228519	2001 TA_{238}	—	October 13, 2001	Anderson Mesa	LONEOS	·	1.5 km	MPC · JPL
228520	2001 UJ	—	October 16, 2001	Socorro	LINEAR	H	830 m	MPC · JPL
228521	2001 UX_{2}	—	October 16, 2001	Socorro	LINEAR	·	1.3 km	MPC · JPL
228522	2001 UY_{25}	—	October 18, 2001	Socorro	LINEAR	·	2.2 km	MPC · JPL
228523	2001 UX_{29}	—	October 16, 2001	Socorro	LINEAR	·	3.5 km	MPC · JPL
228524	2001 UP_{31}	—	October 16, 2001	Socorro	LINEAR	NYS	1.5 km	MPC · JPL
228525	2001 UE_{43}	—	October 17, 2001	Socorro	LINEAR	·	1.2 km	MPC · JPL
228526	2001 UC_{83}	—	October 20, 2001	Socorro	LINEAR	NYS	1.8 km	MPC · JPL
228527	2001 UN_{101}	—	October 20, 2001	Socorro	LINEAR	·	1.8 km	MPC · JPL
228528	2001 UT_{113}	—	October 22, 2001	Socorro	LINEAR	NYS	1.7 km	MPC · JPL
228529	2001 UE_{116}	—	October 22, 2001	Socorro	LINEAR	(5)	1.4 km	MPC · JPL
228530	2001 UO_{118}	—	October 22, 2001	Socorro	LINEAR	·	1.8 km	MPC · JPL
228531	2001 UV_{136}	—	October 23, 2001	Socorro	LINEAR	NYS	1.6 km	MPC · JPL
228532	2001 VF_{19}	—	November 9, 2001	Socorro	LINEAR	(5)	1.2 km	MPC · JPL
228533	2001 VR_{19}	—	November 9, 2001	Socorro	LINEAR	RAF	1.4 km	MPC · JPL
228534	2001 VO_{35}	—	November 9, 2001	Socorro	LINEAR	·	1.3 km	MPC · JPL
228535	2001 VL_{55}	—	November 10, 2001	Socorro	LINEAR	HIL · 3:2	7.4 km	MPC · JPL
228536	2001 VJ_{63}	—	November 10, 2001	Socorro	LINEAR	·	2.5 km	MPC · JPL
228537	2001 VX_{80}	—	November 10, 2001	Palomar	NEAT	·	1.8 km	MPC · JPL
228538	2001 VO_{95}	—	November 15, 2001	Socorro	LINEAR	·	2.6 km	MPC · JPL
228539	2001 VS_{100}	—	November 12, 2001	Socorro	LINEAR	·	1.7 km	MPC · JPL
228540	2001 VX_{109}	—	November 12, 2001	Socorro	LINEAR	·	1.5 km	MPC · JPL
228541	2001 WU_{7}	—	November 17, 2001	Socorro	LINEAR	SUL	2.6 km	MPC · JPL
228542	2001 WS_{18}	—	November 17, 2001	Socorro	LINEAR	(5)	1.1 km	MPC · JPL
228543	2001 WP_{30}	—	November 17, 2001	Socorro	LINEAR	NYS	1.9 km	MPC · JPL
228544	2001 WR_{53}	—	November 19, 2001	Socorro	LINEAR	·	1.6 km	MPC · JPL
228545	2001 WJ_{56}	—	November 19, 2001	Socorro	LINEAR	·	2.0 km	MPC · JPL
228546	2001 WW_{76}	—	November 20, 2001	Socorro	LINEAR	MAS	1.1 km	MPC · JPL
228547	2001 WM_{95}	—	November 20, 2001	Kitt Peak	Spacewatch	·	1.4 km	MPC · JPL
228548	2001 XE_{2}	—	December 8, 2001	Socorro	LINEAR	H	1.1 km	MPC · JPL
228549	2001 XA_{3}	—	December 9, 2001	Socorro	LINEAR	H	990 m	MPC · JPL
228550	2001 XL_{15}	—	December 10, 2001	Socorro	LINEAR	·	1.2 km	MPC · JPL
228551	2001 XH_{23}	—	December 9, 2001	Socorro	LINEAR	·	1.2 km	MPC · JPL
228552	2001 XH_{31}	—	December 11, 2001	Socorro	LINEAR	H	850 m	MPC · JPL
228553	2001 XU_{71}	—	December 11, 2001	Socorro	LINEAR	·	1.4 km	MPC · JPL
228554	2001 XG_{83}	—	December 11, 2001	Socorro	LINEAR	NYS	1.9 km	MPC · JPL
228555	2001 XU_{96}	—	December 10, 2001	Socorro	LINEAR	·	3.6 km	MPC · JPL
228556	2001 XF_{102}	—	December 11, 2001	Socorro	LINEAR	·	2.4 km	MPC · JPL
228557	2001 XH_{103}	—	December 14, 2001	Socorro	LINEAR	H	830 m	MPC · JPL
228558	2001 XV_{103}	—	December 14, 2001	Socorro	LINEAR	H	1 km	MPC · JPL
228559	2001 XD_{105}	—	December 14, 2001	Kitt Peak	Spacewatch	3:2	6.6 km	MPC · JPL
228560	2001 XZ_{125}	—	December 14, 2001	Socorro	LINEAR	·	2.0 km	MPC · JPL
228561	2001 XC_{137}	—	December 14, 2001	Socorro	LINEAR	·	1.9 km	MPC · JPL
228562	2001 XD_{153}	—	December 14, 2001	Socorro	LINEAR	·	2.5 km	MPC · JPL
228563	2001 XZ_{154}	—	December 14, 2001	Socorro	LINEAR	·	2.0 km	MPC · JPL
228564	2001 XP_{187}	—	December 14, 2001	Socorro	LINEAR	·	1.8 km	MPC · JPL
228565	2001 XQ_{188}	—	December 14, 2001	Socorro	LINEAR	·	1.8 km	MPC · JPL
228566	2001 XW_{199}	—	December 14, 2001	Socorro	LINEAR	·	2.7 km	MPC · JPL
228567	2001 XH_{202}	—	December 11, 2001	Socorro	LINEAR	·	2.2 km	MPC · JPL
228568	2001 XR_{207}	—	December 11, 2001	Socorro	LINEAR	T_{j} (2.97) · 3:2	8.3 km	MPC · JPL
228569	2001 XV_{219}	—	December 15, 2001	Socorro	LINEAR	ADE	3.7 km	MPC · JPL
228570	2001 XA_{221}	—	December 15, 2001	Socorro	LINEAR	·	1.3 km	MPC · JPL
228571	2001 XN_{223}	—	December 15, 2001	Socorro	LINEAR	3:2	7.5 km	MPC · JPL
228572	2001 YY_{4}	—	December 23, 2001	Kingsnake	J. V. McClusky	·	650 m	MPC · JPL
228573	2001 YC_{8}	—	December 17, 2001	Socorro	LINEAR	·	1.6 km	MPC · JPL
228574	2001 YU_{57}	—	December 18, 2001	Socorro	LINEAR	·	1.6 km	MPC · JPL
228575	2001 YW_{58}	—	December 18, 2001	Socorro	LINEAR	·	1.6 km	MPC · JPL
228576	2001 YR_{72}	—	December 18, 2001	Socorro	LINEAR	·	2.3 km	MPC · JPL
228577	2001 YM_{88}	—	December 18, 2001	Socorro	LINEAR	MAR	1.4 km	MPC · JPL
228578	2001 YB_{92}	—	December 18, 2001	Palomar	NEAT	·	2.2 km	MPC · JPL
228579	2001 YF_{92}	—	December 18, 2001	Palomar	NEAT	H	850 m	MPC · JPL
228580	2001 YP_{96}	—	December 18, 2001	Palomar	NEAT	·	1.8 km	MPC · JPL
228581	2001 YL_{100}	—	December 17, 2001	Socorro	LINEAR	·	4.1 km	MPC · JPL
228582	2001 YJ_{112}	—	December 18, 2001	Palomar	NEAT	·	2.1 km	MPC · JPL
228583	2001 YA_{121}	—	December 21, 2001	Kitt Peak	Spacewatch	KRM	3.9 km	MPC · JPL
228584	2001 YA_{127}	—	December 17, 2001	Socorro	LINEAR	·	3.8 km	MPC · JPL
228585	2001 YO_{161}	—	December 17, 2001	Socorro	LINEAR	·	1.9 km	MPC · JPL
228586	2002 AG_{4}	—	January 8, 2002	Socorro	LINEAR	H	670 m	MPC · JPL
228587	2002 AP_{7}	—	January 9, 2002	Socorro	LINEAR	AMO	430 m	MPC · JPL
228588	2002 AJ_{26}	—	January 11, 2002	Kitt Peak	Spacewatch	·	2.2 km	MPC · JPL
228589	2002 AG_{35}	—	January 8, 2002	Socorro	LINEAR	·	1.9 km	MPC · JPL
228590	2002 AE_{38}	—	January 9, 2002	Socorro	LINEAR	·	1.4 km	MPC · JPL
228591	2002 AG_{51}	—	January 9, 2002	Socorro	LINEAR	RAF	1.2 km	MPC · JPL
228592	2002 AY_{51}	—	January 9, 2002	Socorro	LINEAR	·	1.5 km	MPC · JPL
228593	2002 AQ_{56}	—	January 9, 2002	Socorro	LINEAR	·	1.6 km	MPC · JPL
228594	2002 AE_{66}	—	January 12, 2002	Socorro	LINEAR	·	1.8 km	MPC · JPL
228595	2002 AV_{71}	—	January 8, 2002	Socorro	LINEAR	EUN	1.9 km	MPC · JPL
228596	2002 AG_{78}	—	January 8, 2002	Socorro	LINEAR	·	2.3 km	MPC · JPL
228597	2002 AQ_{96}	—	January 8, 2002	Socorro	LINEAR	(5)	1.3 km	MPC · JPL
228598	2002 AC_{98}	—	January 8, 2002	Socorro	LINEAR	·	1.1 km	MPC · JPL
228599	2002 AF_{115}	—	January 9, 2002	Socorro	LINEAR	·	2.0 km	MPC · JPL
228600	2002 AF_{138}	—	January 9, 2002	Socorro	LINEAR	·	1.8 km	MPC · JPL

== 228601–228700 ==
back to top

Designation			Discovery			Properties		Ref
Permanent	Provisional	Named after	Date	Site	Discoverer(s)	Category	Diam.	Ref
228601	2002 AR_{163}	—	January 13, 2002	Socorro	LINEAR	(5)	1.7 km	MPC · JPL
228602	2002 AH_{164}	—	January 13, 2002	Socorro	LINEAR	(5)	3.1 km	MPC · JPL
228603	2002 AB_{177}	—	January 14, 2002	Socorro	LINEAR	·	1.6 km	MPC · JPL
228604	2002 AC_{178}	—	January 14, 2002	Socorro	LINEAR	(5)	1.6 km	MPC · JPL
228605	2002 AS_{187}	—	January 8, 2002	Haleakala	NEAT	·	5.0 km	MPC · JPL
228606	2002 BU_{2}	—	January 18, 2002	Anderson Mesa	LONEOS	·	2.7 km	MPC · JPL
228607	2002 BH_{5}	—	January 19, 2002	Anderson Mesa	LONEOS	ADE	4.3 km	MPC · JPL
228608	2002 BT_{5}	—	January 18, 2002	Socorro	LINEAR	·	1.7 km	MPC · JPL
228609	2002 BW_{18}	—	January 21, 2002	Socorro	LINEAR	·	1.6 km	MPC · JPL
228610	2002 BO_{19}	—	January 21, 2002	Palomar	NEAT	·	1.8 km	MPC · JPL
228611	2002 BC_{24}	—	January 23, 2002	Socorro	LINEAR	·	2.6 km	MPC · JPL
228612	2002 BZ_{31}	—	January 26, 2002	Palomar	NEAT	·	1.6 km	MPC · JPL
228613	2002 CY_{5}	—	February 4, 2002	Haleakala	NEAT	·	1.7 km	MPC · JPL
228614	2002 CV_{30}	—	February 6, 2002	Socorro	LINEAR	(5)	1.7 km	MPC · JPL
228615	2002 CH_{35}	—	February 6, 2002	Socorro	LINEAR	EUN	1.8 km	MPC · JPL
228616	2002 CR_{35}	—	February 7, 2002	Socorro	LINEAR	·	2.1 km	MPC · JPL
228617	2002 CS_{39}	—	February 7, 2002	Palomar	NEAT	H	970 m	MPC · JPL
228618	2002 CC_{49}	—	February 3, 2002	Haleakala	NEAT	·	1.5 km	MPC · JPL
228619	2002 CE_{73}	—	February 7, 2002	Socorro	LINEAR	·	1.8 km	MPC · JPL
228620	2002 CA_{75}	—	February 7, 2002	Socorro	LINEAR	·	1.8 km	MPC · JPL
228621	2002 CT_{82}	—	February 7, 2002	Socorro	LINEAR	·	3.1 km	MPC · JPL
228622	2002 CR_{97}	—	February 7, 2002	Socorro	LINEAR	·	2.0 km	MPC · JPL
228623	2002 CO_{102}	—	February 7, 2002	Socorro	LINEAR	·	2.7 km	MPC · JPL
228624	2002 CD_{106}	—	February 7, 2002	Socorro	LINEAR	·	2.3 km	MPC · JPL
228625	2002 CB_{126}	—	February 7, 2002	Socorro	LINEAR	·	1.5 km	MPC · JPL
228626	2002 CP_{142}	—	February 9, 2002	Socorro	LINEAR	·	1.9 km	MPC · JPL
228627	2002 CB_{158}	—	February 7, 2002	Socorro	LINEAR	·	2.1 km	MPC · JPL
228628	2002 CS_{185}	—	February 10, 2002	Socorro	LINEAR	·	1.8 km	MPC · JPL
228629	2002 CH_{215}	—	February 10, 2002	Socorro	LINEAR	·	1.8 km	MPC · JPL
228630	2002 CR_{227}	—	February 6, 2002	Palomar	NEAT	(5)	1.8 km	MPC · JPL
228631	2002 CB_{234}	—	February 12, 2002	Palomar	NEAT	·	3.0 km	MPC · JPL
228632	2002 CQ_{251}	—	February 3, 2002	Palomar	NEAT	EUN	1.9 km	MPC · JPL
228633 Stevegribbin	2002 CS_{255}	Stevegribbin	February 6, 2002	Kitt Peak	M. W. Buie	·	2.5 km	MPC · JPL
228634	2002 CU_{255}	—	February 6, 2002	Palomar	NEAT	·	1.5 km	MPC · JPL
228635	2002 CZ_{272}	—	February 8, 2002	Palomar	NEAT	·	3.7 km	MPC · JPL
228636	2002 CK_{273}	—	February 8, 2002	Kitt Peak	Spacewatch	·	1.4 km	MPC · JPL
228637	2002 CH_{285}	—	February 10, 2002	Socorro	LINEAR	·	2.2 km	MPC · JPL
228638	2002 CV_{302}	—	February 12, 2002	Socorro	LINEAR	·	1.5 km	MPC · JPL
228639	2002 CA_{309}	—	February 10, 2002	Socorro	LINEAR	·	1.5 km	MPC · JPL
228640	2002 EU_{15}	—	March 6, 2002	Palomar	NEAT	·	1.5 km	MPC · JPL
228641	2002 ET_{19}	—	March 6, 2002	Socorro	LINEAR	ADE	3.9 km	MPC · JPL
228642	2002 EK_{24}	—	March 5, 2002	Kitt Peak	Spacewatch	·	3.3 km	MPC · JPL
228643	2002 EP_{33}	—	March 11, 2002	Palomar	NEAT	(5)	2.0 km	MPC · JPL
228644	2002 EY_{33}	—	March 11, 2002	Palomar	NEAT	(5)	1.5 km	MPC · JPL
228645	2002 EW_{43}	—	March 12, 2002	Socorro	LINEAR	·	1.6 km	MPC · JPL
228646	2002 EA_{53}	—	March 9, 2002	Socorro	LINEAR	·	2.0 km	MPC · JPL
228647	2002 EJ_{64}	—	March 13, 2002	Socorro	LINEAR	·	3.6 km	MPC · JPL
228648	2002 EQ_{75}	—	March 14, 2002	Palomar	NEAT	KON	3.3 km	MPC · JPL
228649	2002 EQ_{85}	—	March 9, 2002	Socorro	LINEAR	·	2.9 km	MPC · JPL
228650	2002 EU_{92}	—	March 14, 2002	Socorro	LINEAR	BRA	2.4 km	MPC · JPL
228651	2002 EQ_{101}	—	March 6, 2002	Socorro	LINEAR	·	2.8 km	MPC · JPL
228652	2002 EP_{120}	—	March 11, 2002	Kitt Peak	Spacewatch	(5)	1.7 km	MPC · JPL
228653	2002 EZ_{129}	—	March 12, 2002	Anderson Mesa	LONEOS	·	3.3 km	MPC · JPL
228654	2002 EQ_{146}	—	March 14, 2002	Anderson Mesa	LONEOS	·	2.8 km	MPC · JPL
228655	2002 FS_{25}	—	March 19, 2002	Palomar	NEAT	·	4.2 km	MPC · JPL
228656	2002 FE_{31}	—	March 20, 2002	Palomar	NEAT	·	3.9 km	MPC · JPL
228657	2002 FD_{36}	—	March 21, 2002	Socorro	LINEAR	·	1.7 km	MPC · JPL
228658	2002 GP_{2}	—	April 4, 2002	Kvistaberg	Uppsala-DLR Asteroid Survey	·	2.8 km	MPC · JPL
228659	2002 GZ_{3}	—	April 8, 2002	Palomar	NEAT	(116763)	1.3 km	MPC · JPL
228660	2002 GP_{11}	—	April 14, 2002	Desert Eagle	W. K. Y. Yeung	·	2.4 km	MPC · JPL
228661	2002 GJ_{22}	—	April 14, 2002	Haleakala	NEAT	·	1.8 km	MPC · JPL
228662	2002 GA_{37}	—	April 2, 2002	Palomar	NEAT	·	2.5 km	MPC · JPL
228663	2002 GU_{71}	—	April 9, 2002	Anderson Mesa	LONEOS	·	3.3 km	MPC · JPL
228664	2002 GM_{76}	—	April 9, 2002	Socorro	LINEAR	·	2.2 km	MPC · JPL
228665	2002 GX_{114}	—	April 11, 2002	Socorro	LINEAR	·	2.6 km	MPC · JPL
228666	2002 GG_{131}	—	April 12, 2002	Socorro	LINEAR	AGN	1.5 km	MPC · JPL
228667	2002 GK_{144}	—	April 11, 2002	Palomar	NEAT	·	3.5 km	MPC · JPL
228668	2002 JF_{5}	—	May 5, 2002	Desert Eagle	W. K. Y. Yeung	·	2.9 km	MPC · JPL
228669	2002 JT_{10}	—	May 7, 2002	Socorro	LINEAR	·	3.9 km	MPC · JPL
228670	2002 JY_{21}	—	May 9, 2002	Desert Eagle	W. K. Y. Yeung	·	4.1 km	MPC · JPL
228671	2002 JX_{59}	—	May 9, 2002	Socorro	LINEAR	·	6.5 km	MPC · JPL
228672	2002 JP_{61}	—	May 8, 2002	Socorro	LINEAR	·	4.0 km	MPC · JPL
228673	2002 JR_{75}	—	May 10, 2002	Socorro	LINEAR	·	3.2 km	MPC · JPL
228674	2002 JZ_{80}	—	May 11, 2002	Socorro	LINEAR	AEO	1.8 km	MPC · JPL
228675	2002 JT_{86}	—	May 11, 2002	Socorro	LINEAR	·	4.2 km	MPC · JPL
228676	2002 JK_{91}	—	May 11, 2002	Socorro	LINEAR	·	3.4 km	MPC · JPL
228677	2002 JW_{118}	—	May 5, 2002	Palomar	NEAT	EUN	2.0 km	MPC · JPL
228678	2002 JW_{122}	—	May 6, 2002	Palomar	NEAT	·	3.7 km	MPC · JPL
228679	2002 KH_{14}	—	May 30, 2002	Palomar	NEAT	MAR	1.4 km	MPC · JPL
228680	2002 KX_{15}	—	May 18, 2002	Palomar	NEAT	·	2.9 km	MPC · JPL
228681	2002 LX_{6}	—	June 1, 2002	Socorro	LINEAR	·	4.6 km	MPC · JPL
228682	2002 LR_{50}	—	June 7, 2002	Kitt Peak	Spacewatch	EOS	3.1 km	MPC · JPL
228683	2002 NJ_{24}	—	July 9, 2002	Socorro	LINEAR	LIX	8.3 km	MPC · JPL
228684	2002 NK_{55}	—	July 9, 2002	Socorro	LINEAR	·	7.3 km	MPC · JPL
228685	2002 ND_{61}	—	July 15, 2002	Palomar	NEAT	·	6.0 km	MPC · JPL
228686	2002 NZ_{64}	—	July 2, 2002	Palomar	NEAT	·	4.8 km	MPC · JPL
228687	2002 OA_{8}	—	July 18, 2002	Palomar	NEAT	·	3.4 km	MPC · JPL
228688	2002 OF_{10}	—	July 21, 2002	Palomar	NEAT	·	3.9 km	MPC · JPL
228689	2002 OR_{16}	—	July 18, 2002	Socorro	LINEAR	·	750 m	MPC · JPL
228690	2002 OE_{28}	—	July 18, 2002	Palomar	NEAT	·	1.8 km	MPC · JPL
228691	2002 OR_{28}	—	July 22, 2002	Palomar	NEAT	·	1.4 km	MPC · JPL
228692	2002 PL_{12}	—	August 5, 2002	Palomar	NEAT	·	6.3 km	MPC · JPL
228693	2002 PN_{17}	—	August 6, 2002	Palomar	NEAT	·	700 m	MPC · JPL
228694	2002 PE_{92}	—	August 14, 2002	Palomar	NEAT	·	5.3 km	MPC · JPL
228695	2002 PU_{92}	—	August 14, 2002	Socorro	LINEAR	·	710 m	MPC · JPL
228696	2002 PX_{95}	—	August 14, 2002	Socorro	LINEAR	·	2.6 km	MPC · JPL
228697	2002 PP_{170}	—	August 11, 2002	Palomar	NEAT	·	720 m	MPC · JPL
228698	2002 PF_{187}	—	August 11, 2002	Palomar	NEAT	·	840 m	MPC · JPL
228699	2002 PX_{187}	—	August 8, 2002	Palomar	NEAT	·	2.9 km	MPC · JPL
228700	2002 QH_{44}	—	August 30, 2002	Palomar	NEAT	·	890 m	MPC · JPL

== 228701–228800 ==
back to top

Designation			Discovery			Properties		Ref
Permanent	Provisional	Named after	Date	Site	Discoverer(s)	Category	Diam.	Ref
228701	2002 QR_{57}	—	August 29, 2002	Palomar	S. F. Hönig	·	960 m	MPC · JPL
228702	2002 QH_{66}	—	August 18, 2002	Palomar	NEAT	·	900 m	MPC · JPL
228703	2002 QM_{83}	—	August 17, 2002	Palomar	NEAT	EOS	2.3 km	MPC · JPL
228704	2002 QC_{93}	—	August 19, 2002	Palomar	NEAT	·	5.2 km	MPC · JPL
228705	2002 QY_{98}	—	August 26, 2002	Palomar	NEAT	·	2.6 km	MPC · JPL
228706	2002 QA_{105}	—	August 27, 2002	Palomar	NEAT	THM	2.9 km	MPC · JPL
228707	2002 QB_{123}	—	August 27, 2002	Palomar	NEAT	·	3.8 km	MPC · JPL
228708	2002 RG_{54}	—	September 5, 2002	Socorro	LINEAR	·	5.2 km	MPC · JPL
228709	2002 RN_{74}	—	September 5, 2002	Socorro	LINEAR	·	900 m	MPC · JPL
228710	2002 RF_{148}	—	September 11, 2002	Palomar	NEAT	·	4.0 km	MPC · JPL
228711	2002 RP_{169}	—	September 13, 2002	Palomar	NEAT	·	1.1 km	MPC · JPL
228712	2002 RZ_{205}	—	September 14, 2002	Palomar	NEAT	·	1.8 km	MPC · JPL
228713	2002 RD_{256}	—	September 4, 2002	Palomar	NEAT	·	3.3 km	MPC · JPL
228714	2002 RM_{257}	—	September 3, 2002	Palomar	NEAT	·	3.7 km	MPC · JPL
228715	2002 RH_{258}	—	September 14, 2002	Palomar	NEAT	·	3.6 km	MPC · JPL
228716	2002 RK_{279}	—	September 8, 2002	Haleakala	NEAT	·	930 m	MPC · JPL
228717	2002 SM_{44}	—	September 29, 2002	Haleakala	NEAT	V	830 m	MPC · JPL
228718	2002 SH_{52}	—	September 17, 2002	Palomar	NEAT	·	1.2 km	MPC · JPL
228719	2002 TP	—	October 1, 2002	Anderson Mesa	LONEOS	HYG	4.3 km	MPC · JPL
228720	2002 TN_{4}	—	October 1, 2002	Socorro	LINEAR	·	860 m	MPC · JPL
228721	2002 TV_{26}	—	October 2, 2002	Socorro	LINEAR	·	710 m	MPC · JPL
228722	2002 TZ_{37}	—	October 2, 2002	Socorro	LINEAR	·	1.2 km	MPC · JPL
228723	2002 TE_{40}	—	October 2, 2002	Socorro	LINEAR	·	1.2 km	MPC · JPL
228724	2002 TZ_{51}	—	October 2, 2002	Socorro	LINEAR	NYS	1.3 km	MPC · JPL
228725	2002 TW_{75}	—	October 1, 2002	Anderson Mesa	LONEOS	·	1.4 km	MPC · JPL
228726	2002 TK_{77}	—	October 1, 2002	Anderson Mesa	LONEOS	·	1.0 km	MPC · JPL
228727	2002 TF_{98}	—	October 3, 2002	Socorro	LINEAR	·	1.1 km	MPC · JPL
228728	2002 TM_{119}	—	October 3, 2002	Palomar	NEAT	·	5.8 km	MPC · JPL
228729	2002 TH_{121}	—	October 3, 2002	Palomar	NEAT	·	1.3 km	MPC · JPL
228730	2002 TX_{124}	—	October 4, 2002	Palomar	NEAT	·	1.1 km	MPC · JPL
228731	2002 TV_{130}	—	October 4, 2002	Socorro	LINEAR	·	4.1 km	MPC · JPL
228732	2002 TQ_{132}	—	October 4, 2002	Socorro	LINEAR	·	1.1 km	MPC · JPL
228733	2002 TY_{132}	—	October 4, 2002	Palomar	NEAT	·	1.9 km	MPC · JPL
228734	2002 TW_{154}	—	October 5, 2002	Palomar	NEAT	·	4.5 km	MPC · JPL
228735	2002 TP_{169}	—	October 3, 2002	Palomar	NEAT	·	5.2 km	MPC · JPL
228736	2002 TY_{204}	—	October 4, 2002	Socorro	LINEAR	·	1.0 km	MPC · JPL
228737	2002 TB_{211}	—	October 7, 2002	Socorro	LINEAR	·	1.3 km	MPC · JPL
228738	2002 TU_{257}	—	October 9, 2002	Socorro	LINEAR	·	780 m	MPC · JPL
228739	2002 TV_{275}	—	October 9, 2002	Socorro	LINEAR	·	1.3 km	MPC · JPL
228740	2002 TT_{281}	—	October 10, 2002	Socorro	LINEAR	(2076)	1.0 km	MPC · JPL
228741	2002 TQ_{282}	—	October 10, 2002	Socorro	LINEAR	·	1.1 km	MPC · JPL
228742	2002 TA_{287}	—	October 10, 2002	Socorro	LINEAR	·	1.1 km	MPC · JPL
228743	2002 TZ_{290}	—	October 10, 2002	Socorro	LINEAR	(2076)	1.2 km	MPC · JPL
228744	2002 UO_{37}	—	October 31, 2002	Palomar	NEAT	·	1.4 km	MPC · JPL
228745	2002 UE_{40}	—	October 31, 2002	Socorro	LINEAR	V	850 m	MPC · JPL
228746	2002 UQ_{51}	—	October 29, 2002	Apache Point	SDSS	LIX	4.0 km	MPC · JPL
228747	2002 VH_{3}	—	November 1, 2002	Palomar	NEAT	·	1.1 km	MPC · JPL
228748	2002 VA_{4}	—	November 1, 2002	Palomar	NEAT	·	950 m	MPC · JPL
228749	2002 VY_{8}	—	November 1, 2002	Palomar	NEAT	·	1.4 km	MPC · JPL
228750	2002 VH_{9}	—	November 1, 2002	Socorro	LINEAR	·	1.3 km	MPC · JPL
228751	2002 VY_{30}	—	November 5, 2002	Socorro	LINEAR	·	1.1 km	MPC · JPL
228752	2002 VG_{31}	—	November 5, 2002	Socorro	LINEAR	·	1.0 km	MPC · JPL
228753	2002 VT_{32}	—	November 5, 2002	Socorro	LINEAR	·	1.3 km	MPC · JPL
228754	2002 VZ_{35}	—	November 5, 2002	Socorro	LINEAR	·	890 m	MPC · JPL
228755	2002 VK_{54}	—	November 6, 2002	Socorro	LINEAR	·	1.2 km	MPC · JPL
228756	2002 VM_{74}	—	November 7, 2002	Socorro	LINEAR	·	1.1 km	MPC · JPL
228757	2002 VF_{80}	—	November 7, 2002	Socorro	LINEAR	·	950 m	MPC · JPL
228758	2002 VZ_{83}	—	November 7, 2002	Socorro	LINEAR	V	1.2 km	MPC · JPL
228759	2002 VC_{90}	—	November 11, 2002	Socorro	LINEAR	·	1.0 km	MPC · JPL
228760	2002 VW_{91}	—	November 11, 2002	Socorro	LINEAR	·	1.5 km	MPC · JPL
228761	2002 VJ_{102}	—	November 12, 2002	Socorro	LINEAR	·	2.5 km	MPC · JPL
228762	2002 VR_{102}	—	November 12, 2002	Socorro	LINEAR	·	1.0 km	MPC · JPL
228763	2002 VN_{104}	—	November 12, 2002	Socorro	LINEAR	·	1.2 km	MPC · JPL
228764	2002 VL_{128}	—	November 14, 2002	Socorro	LINEAR	·	1.3 km	MPC · JPL
228765	2002 VH_{131}	—	November 13, 2002	Kingsnake	J. V. McClusky	·	7.4 km	MPC · JPL
228766	2002 VS_{146}	—	November 4, 2002	Palomar	NEAT	·	1.9 km	MPC · JPL
228767	2002 WX_{5}	—	November 24, 2002	Palomar	NEAT	·	1.0 km	MPC · JPL
228768	2002 WQ_{17}	—	November 30, 2002	Socorro	LINEAR	PHO	1.1 km	MPC · JPL
228769	2002 WP_{21}	—	November 24, 2002	Palomar	NEAT	NYS	1.3 km	MPC · JPL
228770	2002 WR_{25}	—	November 16, 2002	Palomar	NEAT	·	1.1 km	MPC · JPL
228771	2002 XU_{18}	—	December 5, 2002	Socorro	LINEAR	·	1.4 km	MPC · JPL
228772	2002 XL_{20}	—	December 2, 2002	Socorro	LINEAR	·	1.2 km	MPC · JPL
228773	2002 XT_{23}	—	December 5, 2002	Socorro	LINEAR	·	1.1 km	MPC · JPL
228774	2002 XR_{29}	—	December 5, 2002	Palomar	NEAT	·	1.2 km	MPC · JPL
228775	2002 XK_{35}	—	December 8, 2002	Desert Eagle	W. K. Y. Yeung	(2076)	1.2 km	MPC · JPL
228776	2002 XD_{42}	—	December 6, 2002	Socorro	LINEAR	·	780 m	MPC · JPL
228777	2002 XZ_{43}	—	December 6, 2002	Socorro	LINEAR	·	1.7 km	MPC · JPL
228778	2002 XJ_{52}	—	December 10, 2002	Socorro	LINEAR	·	1.3 km	MPC · JPL
228779	2002 XP_{53}	—	December 10, 2002	Palomar	NEAT	·	1.2 km	MPC · JPL
228780	2002 XS_{84}	—	December 11, 2002	Socorro	LINEAR	·	3.2 km	MPC · JPL
228781	2002 XM_{96}	—	December 5, 2002	Socorro	LINEAR	(883)	1.4 km	MPC · JPL
228782	2002 XO_{104}	—	December 5, 2002	Socorro	LINEAR	·	780 m	MPC · JPL
228783	2002 XX_{108}	—	December 6, 2002	Socorro	LINEAR	·	930 m	MPC · JPL
228784	2002 XP_{109}	—	December 6, 2002	Socorro	LINEAR	·	900 m	MPC · JPL
228785	2002 YG_{7}	—	December 28, 2002	Anderson Mesa	LONEOS	·	1.5 km	MPC · JPL
228786	2002 YJ_{9}	—	December 31, 2002	Socorro	LINEAR	·	1.3 km	MPC · JPL
228787	2002 YH_{10}	—	December 31, 2002	Socorro	LINEAR	·	1.5 km	MPC · JPL
228788	2002 YM_{17}	—	December 31, 2002	Socorro	LINEAR	·	1.8 km	MPC · JPL
228789	2002 YW_{20}	—	December 31, 2002	Socorro	LINEAR	PHO	1.4 km	MPC · JPL
228790	2002 YJ_{24}	—	December 31, 2002	Socorro	LINEAR	V	1.1 km	MPC · JPL
228791	2002 YQ_{29}	—	December 31, 2002	Socorro	LINEAR	NYS · fast	1.6 km	MPC · JPL
228792	2002 YM_{30}	—	December 31, 2002	Socorro	LINEAR	·	1.2 km	MPC · JPL
228793	2002 YM_{33}	—	December 31, 2002	Socorro	LINEAR	·	1.2 km	MPC · JPL
228794	2003 AT_{13}	—	January 1, 2003	Socorro	LINEAR	·	1.9 km	MPC · JPL
228795	2003 AY_{26}	—	January 4, 2003	Socorro	LINEAR	·	1.1 km	MPC · JPL
228796	2003 AC_{27}	—	January 4, 2003	Socorro	LINEAR	NYS	1.4 km	MPC · JPL
228797	2003 AX_{32}	—	January 5, 2003	Socorro	LINEAR	·	890 m	MPC · JPL
228798	2003 AO_{33}	—	January 5, 2003	Socorro	LINEAR	MAS	1.1 km	MPC · JPL
228799	2003 AP_{38}	—	January 7, 2003	Socorro	LINEAR	·	1.8 km	MPC · JPL
228800	2003 AL_{48}	—	January 5, 2003	Socorro	LINEAR	·	2.5 km	MPC · JPL

== 228801–228900 ==
back to top

Designation			Discovery			Properties		Ref
Permanent	Provisional	Named after	Date	Site	Discoverer(s)	Category	Diam.	Ref
228801	2003 AB_{55}	—	January 5, 2003	Socorro	LINEAR	·	2.9 km	MPC · JPL
228802	2003 AP_{61}	—	January 7, 2003	Socorro	LINEAR	·	1.6 km	MPC · JPL
228803	2003 AX_{62}	—	January 8, 2003	Socorro	LINEAR	V	1.2 km	MPC · JPL
228804	2003 AE_{63}	—	January 8, 2003	Socorro	LINEAR	·	1.9 km	MPC · JPL
228805	2003 AW_{78}	—	January 10, 2003	Kitt Peak	Spacewatch	·	1.6 km	MPC · JPL
228806	2003 AA_{82}	—	January 11, 2003	Socorro	LINEAR	PHO	1.5 km	MPC · JPL
228807	2003 AZ_{82}	—	January 8, 2003	Socorro	LINEAR	·	2.0 km	MPC · JPL
228808	2003 AR_{88}	—	January 2, 2003	Socorro	LINEAR	·	1.4 km	MPC · JPL
228809	2003 AP_{91}	—	January 5, 2003	Anderson Mesa	LONEOS	·	2.6 km	MPC · JPL
228810	2003 BZ_{2}	—	January 25, 2003	Socorro	LINEAR	·	1.5 km	MPC · JPL
228811	2003 BR_{6}	—	January 24, 2003	Palomar	NEAT	V	1.1 km	MPC · JPL
228812	2003 BM_{14}	—	January 26, 2003	Haleakala	NEAT	·	1.6 km	MPC · JPL
228813	2003 BL_{17}	—	January 26, 2003	Haleakala	NEAT	ERI	1.2 km	MPC · JPL
228814	2003 BP_{17}	—	January 27, 2003	Socorro	LINEAR	·	1.3 km	MPC · JPL
228815	2003 BW_{24}	—	January 25, 2003	Palomar	NEAT	·	1.3 km	MPC · JPL
228816	2003 BE_{28}	—	January 26, 2003	Haleakala	NEAT	·	1.5 km	MPC · JPL
228817	2003 BN_{31}	—	January 27, 2003	Socorro	LINEAR	·	1.4 km	MPC · JPL
228818	2003 BC_{38}	—	January 27, 2003	Anderson Mesa	LONEOS	NYS	1.3 km	MPC · JPL
228819	2003 BH_{55}	—	January 27, 2003	Haleakala	NEAT	·	1.9 km	MPC · JPL
228820	2003 BJ_{55}	—	January 27, 2003	Haleakala	NEAT	·	1.5 km	MPC · JPL
228821	2003 BV_{57}	—	January 27, 2003	Socorro	LINEAR	NYS	1.6 km	MPC · JPL
228822	2003 BR_{62}	—	January 28, 2003	Palomar	NEAT	·	1.7 km	MPC · JPL
228823	2003 BF_{65}	—	January 30, 2003	Palomar	NEAT	·	1.3 km	MPC · JPL
228824	2003 BR_{66}	—	January 30, 2003	Anderson Mesa	LONEOS	·	2.1 km	MPC · JPL
228825	2003 BK_{74}	—	January 29, 2003	Palomar	NEAT	·	2.2 km	MPC · JPL
228826	2003 BC_{80}	—	January 31, 2003	Socorro	LINEAR	·	2.2 km	MPC · JPL
228827	2003 BV_{86}	—	January 26, 2003	Anderson Mesa	LONEOS	NYS ·	3.0 km	MPC · JPL
228828	2003 CS_{12}	—	February 2, 2003	Palomar	NEAT	·	1.8 km	MPC · JPL
228829	2003 CO_{14}	—	February 3, 2003	Anderson Mesa	LONEOS	·	1.5 km	MPC · JPL
228830	2003 DP	—	February 20, 2003	Haleakala	NEAT	NYS	1.8 km	MPC · JPL
228831	2003 DN_{2}	—	February 22, 2003	Palomar	NEAT	MAS	940 m	MPC · JPL
228832	2003 DE_{3}	—	February 22, 2003	Palomar	NEAT	NYS	1.1 km	MPC · JPL
228833	2003 DV_{3}	—	February 22, 2003	Palomar	NEAT	fast	1.2 km	MPC · JPL
228834	2003 DL_{8}	—	February 22, 2003	Palomar	NEAT	·	1.3 km	MPC · JPL
228835	2003 DU_{8}	—	February 22, 2003	Palomar	NEAT	·	970 m	MPC · JPL
228836	2003 DW_{8}	—	February 22, 2003	Palomar	NEAT	NYS	1.9 km	MPC · JPL
228837	2003 EY_{6}	—	March 6, 2003	Anderson Mesa	LONEOS	MAS	860 m	MPC · JPL
228838	2003 EQ_{12}	—	March 6, 2003	Socorro	LINEAR	·	1.4 km	MPC · JPL
228839	2003 EG_{14}	—	March 7, 2003	Palomar	NEAT	·	1.9 km	MPC · JPL
228840	2003 EV_{19}	—	March 6, 2003	Anderson Mesa	LONEOS	·	1.5 km	MPC · JPL
228841	2003 EZ_{24}	—	March 6, 2003	Anderson Mesa	LONEOS	·	1.4 km	MPC · JPL
228842	2003 EN_{32}	—	March 7, 2003	Anderson Mesa	LONEOS	·	1.9 km	MPC · JPL
228843	2003 ES_{46}	—	March 8, 2003	Socorro	LINEAR	·	1.7 km	MPC · JPL
228844	2003 EX_{51}	—	March 11, 2003	Palomar	NEAT	NYS	1.4 km	MPC · JPL
228845	2003 EQ_{54}	—	March 7, 2003	Kitt Peak	Spacewatch	MAS · fast	1.1 km	MPC · JPL
228846	2003 EG_{60}	—	March 6, 2003	Goodricke-Pigott	R. A. Tucker	ERI	2.5 km	MPC · JPL
228847	2003 FW	—	March 20, 2003	Palomar	NEAT	·	1.4 km	MPC · JPL
228848	2003 FC_{31}	—	March 23, 2003	Palomar	NEAT	·	1.9 km	MPC · JPL
228849	2003 FP_{37}	—	March 23, 2003	Kitt Peak	Spacewatch	·	2.2 km	MPC · JPL
228850	2003 FZ_{51}	—	March 25, 2003	Palomar	NEAT	·	2.6 km	MPC · JPL
228851	2003 FD_{65}	—	March 26, 2003	Palomar	NEAT	·	1.9 km	MPC · JPL
228852	2003 FJ_{77}	—	March 27, 2003	Palomar	NEAT	·	1.5 km	MPC · JPL
228853	2003 FU_{84}	—	March 28, 2003	Anderson Mesa	LONEOS	·	2.2 km	MPC · JPL
228854	2003 FP_{98}	—	March 30, 2003	Socorro	LINEAR	NYS	1.5 km	MPC · JPL
228855	2003 FK_{109}	—	March 31, 2003	Anderson Mesa	LONEOS	NYS	1.4 km	MPC · JPL
228856	2003 FN_{116}	—	March 23, 2003	Kitt Peak	Spacewatch	NYS	1.8 km	MPC · JPL
228857	2003 FD_{120}	—	March 23, 2003	Palomar	NEAT	V	1.1 km	MPC · JPL
228858	2003 GL	—	April 1, 2003	Socorro	LINEAR	H	980 m	MPC · JPL
228859	2003 GY_{3}	—	April 1, 2003	Socorro	LINEAR	·	1.2 km	MPC · JPL
228860	2003 GX_{4}	—	April 1, 2003	Socorro	LINEAR	·	1.3 km	MPC · JPL
228861	2003 GG_{12}	—	April 1, 2003	Socorro	LINEAR	NYS	1.5 km	MPC · JPL
228862	2003 GX_{31}	—	April 8, 2003	Palomar	NEAT	T_{j} (2.94)	7.0 km	MPC · JPL
228863	2003 GO_{32}	—	April 8, 2003	Socorro	LINEAR	·	3.0 km	MPC · JPL
228864	2003 GL_{35}	—	April 7, 2003	Palomar	NEAT	NYS	1.4 km	MPC · JPL
228865	2003 GT_{47}	—	April 8, 2003	Socorro	LINEAR	NYS	2.1 km	MPC · JPL
228866	2003 HM_{4}	—	April 24, 2003	Anderson Mesa	LONEOS	ADE	4.1 km	MPC · JPL
228867	2003 HS_{7}	—	April 24, 2003	Anderson Mesa	LONEOS	GEF	1.8 km	MPC · JPL
228868	2003 HB_{12}	—	April 25, 2003	Anderson Mesa	LONEOS	·	2.9 km	MPC · JPL
228869	2003 HU_{21}	—	April 27, 2003	Anderson Mesa	LONEOS	·	2.3 km	MPC · JPL
228870	2003 HL_{27}	—	April 28, 2003	Socorro	LINEAR	·	1.8 km	MPC · JPL
228871	2003 HQ_{31}	—	April 26, 2003	Haleakala	NEAT	·	4.3 km	MPC · JPL
228872	2003 HS_{38}	—	April 29, 2003	Haleakala	NEAT	·	3.7 km	MPC · JPL
228873	2003 HD_{45}	—	April 29, 2003	Socorro	LINEAR	·	2.7 km	MPC · JPL
228874	2003 HD_{52}	—	April 30, 2003	Kitt Peak	Spacewatch	·	2.3 km	MPC · JPL
228875	2003 KX_{3}	—	May 23, 2003	Reedy Creek	J. Broughton	·	3.0 km	MPC · JPL
228876	2003 LH_{4}	—	June 3, 2003	Socorro	LINEAR	H	980 m	MPC · JPL
228877	2003 MM_{2}	—	June 23, 2003	Anderson Mesa	LONEOS	·	7.7 km	MPC · JPL
228878	2003 ME_{3}	—	June 25, 2003	Socorro	LINEAR	·	2.6 km	MPC · JPL
228879	2003 NF	—	July 1, 2003	Socorro	LINEAR	·	2.6 km	MPC · JPL
228880	2003 OA_{8}	—	July 27, 2003	Socorro	LINEAR	·	6.2 km	MPC · JPL
228881	2003 OT_{8}	—	July 22, 2003	Socorro	LINEAR	·	6.3 km	MPC · JPL
228882	2003 OW_{17}	—	July 29, 2003	Reedy Creek	J. Broughton	·	3.4 km	MPC · JPL
228883 Cliffsimak	2003 PT_{4}	Cliffsimak	August 2, 2003	Saint-Sulpice	B. Christophe	EOS	3.2 km	MPC · JPL
228884	2003 QK_{15}	—	August 20, 2003	Palomar	NEAT	·	2.6 km	MPC · JPL
228885	2003 QZ_{24}	—	August 22, 2003	Palomar	NEAT	·	5.0 km	MPC · JPL
228886	2003 QF_{28}	—	August 21, 2003	Campo Imperatore	CINEOS	·	4.6 km	MPC · JPL
228887	2003 QR_{31}	—	August 21, 2003	Palomar	NEAT	·	2.8 km	MPC · JPL
228888	2003 QA_{67}	—	August 23, 2003	Palomar	NEAT	AGN	1.9 km	MPC · JPL
228889	2003 QH_{70}	—	August 22, 2003	Bergisch Gladbach	W. Bickel	·	3.2 km	MPC · JPL
228890	2003 QH_{78}	—	August 24, 2003	Socorro	LINEAR	·	6.4 km	MPC · JPL
228891	2003 QU_{99}	—	August 28, 2003	Socorro	LINEAR	·	6.7 km	MPC · JPL
228892	2003 QL_{115}	—	August 31, 2003	Haleakala	NEAT	LIX	5.2 km	MPC · JPL
228893 Gerevich	2003 RL_{8}	Gerevich	September 6, 2003	Piszkéstető	K. Sárneczky, B. Sipőcz	AGN	1.6 km	MPC · JPL
228894	2003 RD_{11}	—	September 13, 2003	Haleakala	NEAT	EOS	3.5 km	MPC · JPL
228895	2003 RQ_{22}	—	September 15, 2003	Haleakala	NEAT	·	4.1 km	MPC · JPL
228896	2003 SF_{11}	—	September 17, 2003	Socorro	LINEAR	H	1.1 km	MPC · JPL
228897	2003 SG_{22}	—	September 16, 2003	Palomar	NEAT	EOS	3.2 km	MPC · JPL
228898	2003 SB_{29}	—	September 18, 2003	Palomar	NEAT	EMA	7.0 km	MPC · JPL
228899	2003 SG_{58}	—	September 17, 2003	Anderson Mesa	LONEOS	·	3.2 km	MPC · JPL
228900	2003 ST_{69}	—	September 17, 2003	Kitt Peak	Spacewatch	·	3.6 km	MPC · JPL

== 228901–229000 ==
back to top

Designation			Discovery			Properties		Ref
Permanent	Provisional	Named after	Date	Site	Discoverer(s)	Category	Diam.	Ref
228901	2003 SG_{71}	—	September 18, 2003	Kitt Peak	Spacewatch	·	5.2 km	MPC · JPL
228902	2003 SS_{79}	—	September 19, 2003	Kitt Peak	Spacewatch	TIR	3.2 km	MPC · JPL
228903	2003 SN_{107}	—	September 20, 2003	Palomar	NEAT	·	4.3 km	MPC · JPL
228904	2003 SO_{133}	—	September 20, 2003	Kitt Peak	Spacewatch	EOS	3.4 km	MPC · JPL
228905	2003 SL_{140}	—	September 19, 2003	Socorro	LINEAR	·	6.2 km	MPC · JPL
228906	2003 SC_{141}	—	September 19, 2003	Palomar	NEAT	LIX	6.0 km	MPC · JPL
228907	2003 SO_{145}	—	September 20, 2003	Socorro	LINEAR	·	3.7 km	MPC · JPL
228908	2003 ST_{145}	—	September 20, 2003	Palomar	NEAT	·	5.6 km	MPC · JPL
228909	2003 SZ_{145}	—	September 20, 2003	Palomar	NEAT	·	6.1 km	MPC · JPL
228910	2003 SD_{153}	—	September 19, 2003	Anderson Mesa	LONEOS	·	3.4 km	MPC · JPL
228911	2003 SA_{164}	—	September 20, 2003	Anderson Mesa	LONEOS	EOS	7.2 km	MPC · JPL
228912	2003 SH_{169}	—	September 23, 2003	Haleakala	NEAT	HYG	4.1 km	MPC · JPL
228913	2003 SD_{184}	—	September 21, 2003	Kitt Peak	Spacewatch	·	4.8 km	MPC · JPL
228914	2003 ST_{200}	—	September 22, 2003	Kitt Peak	Spacewatch	THM	4.3 km	MPC · JPL
228915	2003 SF_{206}	—	September 23, 2003	Palomar	NEAT	VER	3.3 km	MPC · JPL
228916	2003 SF_{214}	—	September 26, 2003	Desert Eagle	W. K. Y. Yeung	·	4.2 km	MPC · JPL
228917	2003 SU_{217}	—	September 28, 2003	Sierra Nevada	Sierra Nevada	·	5.7 km	MPC · JPL
228918	2003 SM_{225}	—	September 26, 2003	Socorro	LINEAR	·	3.8 km	MPC · JPL
228919	2003 SN_{225}	—	September 26, 2003	Socorro	LINEAR	·	2.9 km	MPC · JPL
228920	2003 SJ_{234}	—	September 25, 2003	Palomar	NEAT	·	4.8 km	MPC · JPL
228921	2003 SZ_{238}	—	September 27, 2003	Socorro	LINEAR	CYB	4.8 km	MPC · JPL
228922	2003 SL_{245}	—	September 26, 2003	Socorro	LINEAR	THM	2.8 km	MPC · JPL
228923	2003 SB_{254}	—	September 27, 2003	Kitt Peak	Spacewatch	·	4.5 km	MPC · JPL
228924	2003 ST_{256}	—	September 28, 2003	Kitt Peak	Spacewatch	·	2.7 km	MPC · JPL
228925	2003 SE_{267}	—	September 29, 2003	Kitt Peak	Spacewatch	·	3.7 km	MPC · JPL
228926	2003 SQ_{275}	—	September 29, 2003	Socorro	LINEAR	THM	2.6 km	MPC · JPL
228927	2003 SY_{284}	—	September 20, 2003	Socorro	LINEAR	·	3.2 km	MPC · JPL
228928	2003 SN_{285}	—	September 20, 2003	Socorro	LINEAR	·	3.7 km	MPC · JPL
228929	2003 SF_{299}	—	September 29, 2003	Anderson Mesa	LONEOS	TIR ·	7.2 km	MPC · JPL
228930	2003 SC_{310}	—	September 28, 2003	Socorro	LINEAR	THM	3.3 km	MPC · JPL
228931	2003 SU_{310}	—	September 29, 2003	Socorro	LINEAR	TIR	2.4 km	MPC · JPL
228932	2003 SY_{319}	—	September 16, 2003	Palomar	NEAT	·	4.1 km	MPC · JPL
228933	2003 SY_{320}	—	September 18, 2003	Campo Imperatore	CINEOS	·	5.2 km	MPC · JPL
228934	2003 SP_{330}	—	September 26, 2003	Apache Point	SDSS	·	2.7 km	MPC · JPL
228935	2003 SK_{350}	—	September 18, 2003	Palomar	NEAT	·	4.1 km	MPC · JPL
228936	2003 SC_{390}	—	September 26, 2003	Apache Point	SDSS	HYG	3.1 km	MPC · JPL
228937	2003 SG_{411}	—	September 28, 2003	Apache Point	SDSS	·	2.1 km	MPC · JPL
228938	2003 TR	—	October 1, 2003	Drebach	Drebach	·	3.7 km	MPC · JPL
228939	2003 TQ_{6}	—	October 1, 2003	Anderson Mesa	LONEOS	EOS	3.0 km	MPC · JPL
228940	2003 TP_{14}	—	October 14, 2003	Anderson Mesa	LONEOS	·	5.6 km	MPC · JPL
228941	2003 TU_{16}	—	October 14, 2003	Palomar	NEAT	·	3.3 km	MPC · JPL
228942	2003 TB_{18}	—	October 14, 2003	Palomar	NEAT	EOS	2.9 km	MPC · JPL
228943	2003 TX_{49}	—	October 3, 2003	Haleakala	NEAT	·	5.7 km	MPC · JPL
228944	2003 TD_{54}	—	October 5, 2003	Kitt Peak	Spacewatch	VER	4.3 km	MPC · JPL
228945	2003 TC_{57}	—	October 5, 2003	Socorro	LINEAR	·	6.1 km	MPC · JPL
228946	2003 TD_{57}	—	October 5, 2003	Socorro	LINEAR	·	5.6 km	MPC · JPL
228947	2003 TQ_{59}	—	October 3, 2003	Kitt Peak	Spacewatch	·	3.5 km	MPC · JPL
228948	2003 UX_{8}	—	October 16, 2003	Socorro	LINEAR	·	5.0 km	MPC · JPL
228949	2003 UD_{53}	—	October 18, 2003	Palomar	NEAT	·	7.5 km	MPC · JPL
228950	2003 UT_{54}	—	October 18, 2003	Palomar	NEAT	·	4.5 km	MPC · JPL
228951	2003 UA_{75}	—	October 17, 2003	Anderson Mesa	LONEOS	EOS	3.3 km	MPC · JPL
228952	2003 UM_{77}	—	October 17, 2003	Anderson Mesa	LONEOS	·	4.8 km	MPC · JPL
228953	2003 UA_{82}	—	October 18, 2003	Haleakala	NEAT	·	4.7 km	MPC · JPL
228954	2003 UQ_{85}	—	October 18, 2003	Kitt Peak	Spacewatch	THM	2.9 km	MPC · JPL
228955	2003 UO_{99}	—	October 19, 2003	Anderson Mesa	LONEOS	·	6.1 km	MPC · JPL
228956	2003 UC_{108}	—	October 19, 2003	Palomar	NEAT	·	4.7 km	MPC · JPL
228957	2003 UU_{112}	—	October 20, 2003	Socorro	LINEAR	EOS	3.7 km	MPC · JPL
228958	2003 UV_{112}	—	October 20, 2003	Socorro	LINEAR	LIX	7.6 km	MPC · JPL
228959	2003 UJ_{113}	—	October 20, 2003	Socorro	LINEAR	·	3.7 km	MPC · JPL
228960	2003 UC_{114}	—	October 20, 2003	Socorro	LINEAR	·	3.6 km	MPC · JPL
228961	2003 UM_{125}	—	October 20, 2003	Socorro	LINEAR	·	3.8 km	MPC · JPL
228962	2003 UT_{133}	—	October 20, 2003	Palomar	NEAT	·	5.5 km	MPC · JPL
228963	2003 UX_{138}	—	October 16, 2003	Palomar	NEAT	·	4.7 km	MPC · JPL
228964	2003 UN_{139}	—	October 16, 2003	Palomar	NEAT	·	3.4 km	MPC · JPL
228965	2003 UC_{143}	—	October 18, 2003	Anderson Mesa	LONEOS	HYG	3.5 km	MPC · JPL
228966	2003 UD_{161}	—	October 21, 2003	Kitt Peak	Spacewatch	HYG	4.8 km	MPC · JPL
228967	2003 UR_{162}	—	October 21, 2003	Socorro	LINEAR	·	4.2 km	MPC · JPL
228968	2003 UW_{170}	—	October 19, 2003	Kitt Peak	Spacewatch	·	4.9 km	MPC · JPL
228969	2003 UT_{184}	—	October 21, 2003	Kitt Peak	Spacewatch	·	4.0 km	MPC · JPL
228970	2003 UT_{196}	—	October 21, 2003	Kitt Peak	Spacewatch	·	2.9 km	MPC · JPL
228971	2003 UH_{199}	—	October 21, 2003	Socorro	LINEAR	·	6.0 km	MPC · JPL
228972	2003 UL_{208}	—	October 22, 2003	Kitt Peak	Spacewatch	·	3.8 km	MPC · JPL
228973	2003 UV_{217}	—	October 21, 2003	Socorro	LINEAR	·	3.9 km	MPC · JPL
228974	2003 UV_{224}	—	October 22, 2003	Kitt Peak	Spacewatch	HYG	3.7 km	MPC · JPL
228975	2003 UB_{250}	—	October 25, 2003	Socorro	LINEAR	HYG	3.4 km	MPC · JPL
228976	2003 UK_{266}	—	October 28, 2003	Socorro	LINEAR	·	6.1 km	MPC · JPL
228977	2003 UH_{271}	—	October 17, 2003	Palomar	NEAT	·	5.7 km	MPC · JPL
228978	2003 UP_{272}	—	October 29, 2003	Kitt Peak	Spacewatch	·	3.5 km	MPC · JPL
228979	2003 UD_{274}	—	October 29, 2003	Haleakala	NEAT	·	4.4 km	MPC · JPL
228980 Robertstrain	2003 UZ_{289}	Robertstrain	October 23, 2003	Kitt Peak	M. W. Buie	THM	3.1 km	MPC · JPL
228981	2003 UC_{316}	—	October 22, 2003	Kitt Peak	Spacewatch	·	4.7 km	MPC · JPL
228982	2003 UF_{316}	—	October 23, 2003	Kitt Peak	Spacewatch	·	2.7 km	MPC · JPL
228983	2003 UU_{322}	—	October 16, 2003	Kitt Peak	Spacewatch	·	3.0 km	MPC · JPL
228984	2003 UA_{375}	—	October 22, 2003	Apache Point	SDSS	·	4.1 km	MPC · JPL
228985	2003 VR_{7}	—	November 15, 2003	Kitt Peak	Spacewatch	·	4.1 km	MPC · JPL
228986	2003 VP_{11}	—	November 4, 2003	Socorro	LINEAR	·	5.9 km	MPC · JPL
228987	2003 WP_{5}	—	November 18, 2003	Palomar	NEAT	·	3.8 km	MPC · JPL
228988	2003 WN_{10}	—	November 18, 2003	Kitt Peak	Spacewatch	·	3.3 km	MPC · JPL
228989	2003 WW_{11}	—	November 18, 2003	Palomar	NEAT	·	4.5 km	MPC · JPL
228990	2003 WV_{36}	—	November 19, 2003	Socorro	LINEAR	EOS	2.9 km	MPC · JPL
228991	2003 WH_{55}	—	November 20, 2003	Socorro	LINEAR	·	5.3 km	MPC · JPL
228992	2003 WV_{71}	—	November 20, 2003	Socorro	LINEAR	·	3.9 km	MPC · JPL
228993	2003 WJ_{72}	—	November 20, 2003	Socorro	LINEAR	·	3.6 km	MPC · JPL
228994	2003 WO_{87}	—	November 21, 2003	Palomar	NEAT	·	6.4 km	MPC · JPL
228995	2003 WO_{95}	—	November 19, 2003	Anderson Mesa	LONEOS	·	7.1 km	MPC · JPL
228996	2003 WF_{101}	—	November 21, 2003	Socorro	LINEAR	·	3.2 km	MPC · JPL
228997	2003 WM_{101}	—	November 21, 2003	Catalina	CSS	·	6.9 km	MPC · JPL
228998	2003 WJ_{112}	—	November 20, 2003	Socorro	LINEAR	·	4.7 km	MPC · JPL
228999	2003 WN_{141}	—	November 21, 2003	Socorro	LINEAR	·	8.4 km	MPC · JPL
229000	2003 WQ_{148}	—	November 24, 2003	Palomar	NEAT	·	6.1 km	MPC · JPL

back to top

== See also ==
- Meanings of minor-planet names: 228001–229000
