= Owen ap Hugh =

Welsh politician

Owen ap Hugh (1518–1613), of Bodeon, near Llangadwaladr, Anglesey was a Welsh politician and Member of Parliament.

He was a Member (MP) of the Parliament of England for Newborough in 1545. He was High Sheriff of Anglesey from 1563 to 1580.

He was the eldest son and heir of Hugh ap Owen and Gwenllian ferch Maurice. He married Sibill Griffith, daughter of Sir William Griffith and Jane Puleston.
