= Meanings of minor-planet names: 228001–229000 =

As minor planet discoveries are confirmed, they are given a permanent number by the IAU's Minor Planet Center (MPC), and the discoverers can then submit names for them, following the IAU's naming conventions. The list below concerns those minor planets in the specified number-range that have received names, and explains the meanings of those names.

Official naming citations of newly named small Solar System bodies are approved and published in a bulletin by IAU's Working Group for Small Bodies Nomenclature (WGSBN). Before May 2021, citations were published in MPC's Minor Planet Circulars for many decades. Recent citations can also be found on the JPL Small-Body Database (SBDB). Until his death in 2016, German astronomer Lutz D. Schmadel compiled these citations into the Dictionary of Minor Planet Names (DMP) and regularly updated the collection.

Based on Paul Herget's The Names of the Minor Planets, Schmadel also researched the unclear origin of numerous asteroids, most of which had been named prior to World War II. This article incorporates text from this source, which is in the public domain: SBDB New namings may only be added to this list below after official publication as the preannouncement of names is condemned. The WGSBN publishes a comprehensive guideline for the naming rules of non-cometary small Solar System bodies.

== 228001–228100 ==
Named minor planet	Provisional	This minor planet was named for...	Ref · Catalog
228029 MANIAC	2008 GN	MANIAC was an early computer, based on the von Neumann architecture.	JPL · 228029
228078 Cavalloni	2008 QY_{6}	Ferenc Cavalloni, prominent Hungarian aero-modeler, physicist, designer, and technical writer	IAU · 228078

== 228101–228200 ==
back to top

Named minor planet	Provisional	This minor planet was named for...	Ref · Catalog
228110 Eudorus	2008 TC_{9}	Eudorus, from Greek mythology. He was one of the captains of Achilles' fierce Myrmidon troops.	JPL · 228110
228133 Ripoll	2009 QM_{22}	Andrés Ripoll (born 1933) was involved in the Apollo, Apollo-Soyuz and Skylab space programs. He was the founder and manager of the Villafranca del Castillo tracking station (Spain) and the European Astronaut Centre (Germany). He has received awards for his extensive professional and research activities.	JPL · 228133
228135 Sodnik	2009 RE_{4}	Zoran Sodnik (born 1957), manager of the ESA's Optical Ground Station.	JPL · 228135
228136 Billary	2009 RF_{4}	William Griffith (born 1956) and Hillary U. Galkin (born 1956), avid amateur astronomers from southern California.	JPL · 228136
228147 Miquelbarceló	2009 SB_{18}	Miquel Barceló Artigues (born 1957), Spanish painter and sculptor known for his expressionist style and experimentation with materials and textures.	JPL · 228147
228158 Mamankei	2009 SZ_{96}	Ma Man-kei (1919–2014) was a Chinese educator and benefactor who devoted his life and finances to running schools and hospitals. He also made contributions to the development of Chinese education and medical treatment in Macao.	JPL · 228158
228165 Mezentsev	2009 SJ_{170}	Andrey Georgievich Mezentsev (born 1949), a Russian astronomer, solar physics expert, coronal holes researcher, lecturer in Petrozavodsk State University and astronomy popularizer.	JPL · 228165
228180 Puertollano	2009 TE_{5}	Puertollano, Spanish industrial city. It is located in the province of Ciudad Real, Castile-La Mancha.	JPL · 228180

== 228201–228300 ==
back to top

Named minor planet	Provisional	This minor planet was named for...	Ref · Catalog
There are no named minor planets in this number range

== 228301–228400 ==
back to top

Named minor planet	Provisional	This minor planet was named for...	Ref · Catalog
There are no named minor planets in this number range

== 228401–228500 ==
back to top

Named minor planet	Provisional	This minor planet was named for...	Ref · Catalog
228409 Bobjensen	2001 FM_{184}	J. Robert Jensen (born 1951), American engineer.	JPL · 228409

== 228501–228600 ==
back to top

Named minor planet	Provisional	This minor planet was named for...	Ref · Catalog
There are no named minor planets in this number range

== 228601–228700 ==
back to top

Named minor planet	Provisional	This minor planet was named for...	Ref · Catalog
228633 Stevegribbin	2002 CS_{255}	Steven P. Gribbin (born 1961), American technical animator.	JPL · 228633

== 228701–228800 ==
back to top

Named minor planet	Provisional	This minor planet was named for...	Ref · Catalog
There are no named minor planets in this number range

== 228801–228900 ==
back to top

Named minor planet	Provisional	This minor planet was named for...	Ref · Catalog
228883 Cliffsimak	2003 PT_{4}	Clifford D. Simak (1904–1988), an American science-fiction writer	JPL · 228883
228893 Gerevich	2003 RL_{8}	Aladár Gerevich (1910–1991), a fencer from Hungary, who is regarded as the greatest Olympic swordsman ever	JPL · 228893

== 228901–229000 ==
back to top

Named minor planet	Provisional	This minor planet was named for...	Ref · Catalog
228980 Robertstrain	2003 UZ_{289}	Robert D. Strain (born 1956), American who served as director of the Johns Hopkins Applied Physics Laboratory.	JPL · 228980

back to top

Preceded by 227,001–228,000	Meanings of minor-planet names List of minor planets: 228,001–229,000	Succeeded by 229,001–230,000
