= William Garonwy Griffiths =

American writer

William Goronwy Griffiths was born and lives on Long Island, New York. He is the author of award-winning books including Malchus, Driven, Takedown, Stingers, Talons, "Methuselah's Pillar", "The Renegade Writer", "Time Trove", "Blindsided", ""Ice Mummies", and The Road to Forgiveness. He is the host of The Renegade Writer TV Show based on research for the books.

== The Road to Forgiveness ==
In The Road to Forgiveness he recounts the death of his daughter and his mother-in-law, Janice Nicolich, in a drunk-driving crash on June 28, 1996.

== Publications ==
- Malchus (2000) ISBN 1-58919-967-7
- The Road to Forgiveness (2001) ISBN 0-7852-6691-7
- Driven (2002) ISBN 0-446-67940-2
- Takedown (2003) ISBN 0-7394-3634-1
- Stingers
- Talons
- "Methuselah's Pillar"
- "The Renegade Writer" (also the renegade writer TV show based on research for the books)
- "Time Trove"
- "Blindsided" (with co-author Roschelle Salmon)
- "Ice Mummies"
