= William Griffith (born 1480) =

Welsh politician

- Born: 1480
- Died: 1545 (aged 64–65)
- Spouses: Jane Stradling; Jane Puleston
- Children: William Griffith; Edward Griffith; Rees Griffith; John Griffith; Rowland Griffith; Catharine Griffith; Elizabeth Griffith; Anne Griffith; Dorothy Griffith; Jane Griffith; Elinor Griffith; Margaret Griffith; William Griffith; Rowland Griffith; John Griffith; Isabella Griffith; Sibill Griffith

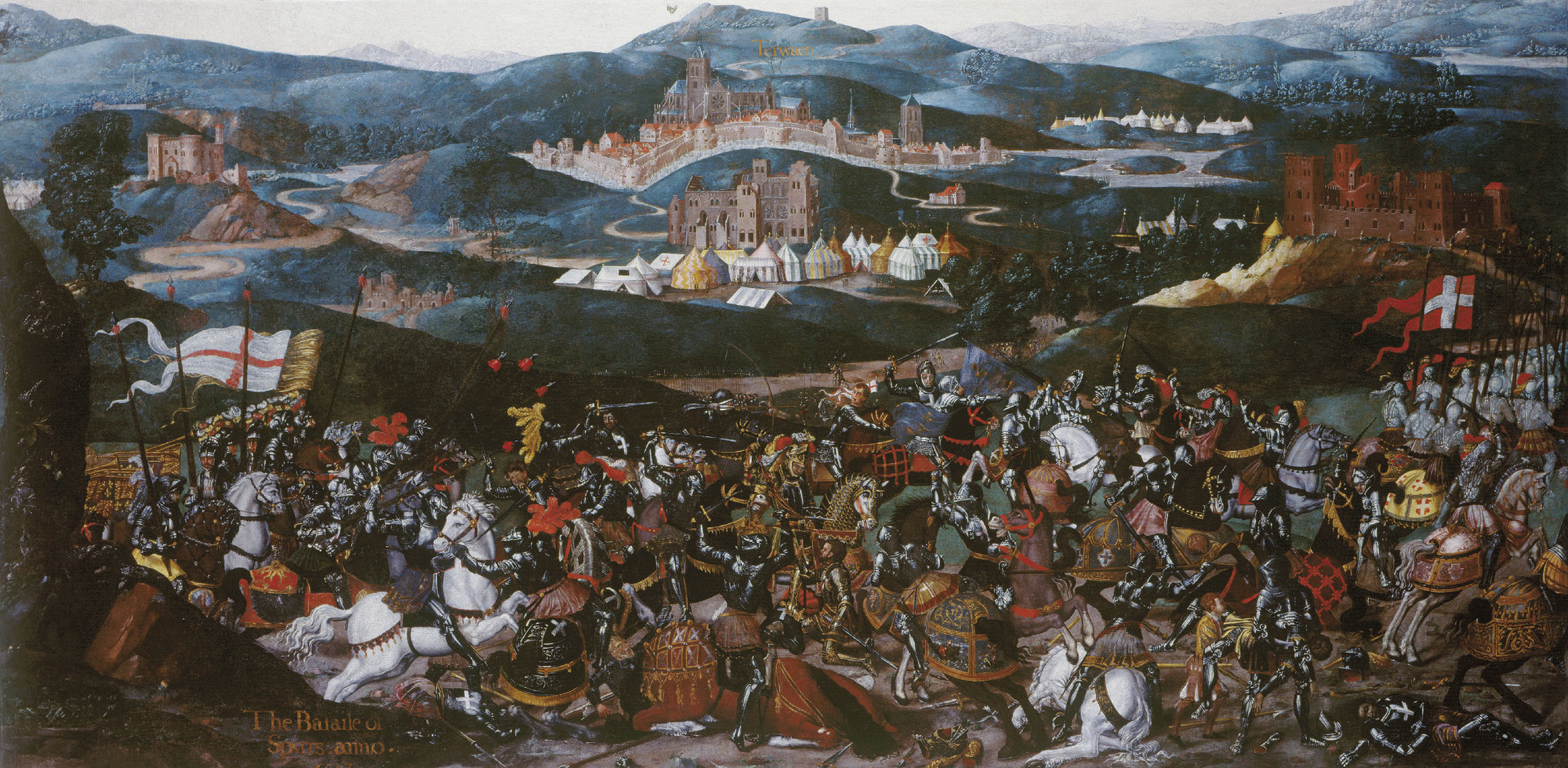
The Battle of the Spurs which Sir William Griffith joined with his relative, Charles Brandon, 1st Duke of Suffolk, and Henry VIII

William Griffith (1480–1545) of Penrhyn Castle was a Welsh politician. He was knighted at the Siege of Tournai in 1513 and was Chamberlain of North Wales in 1520. He was with Henry VIII of England at the Sieges of Boulogne (1544–46).

== Early life ==
He was the son of Sir William Griffith the Hael, Chamberlain and Captain of Caernarfon Castle, and Jane Troutbeck.

Through his father's second wife, he was the stepson of Elizabeth Grey, the first cousin of John Grey, Lord Ferrers of Groby, who was the first husband of Queen Elizabeth Woodville. As a result, his father was close to the House of Grey, and became a member of King Edward IV's council. He was also knighted by Arthur Tudor, Prince of Wales.

His grandmother was Margaret Stanley, daughter of Lord Thomas Stanley, who became King of Mann and Lord Chamberlain, and his grandaunt was Lady Margaret Beaufort, mother of the first Tudor monarch, Henry VII. His granduncles were Commander Sir John Savage and Archbishop Thomas Savage of the Savage family of Melford Hall.

== Career ==
William Griffith is recorded as King's Servant and squire for the body, and was appointed Chamberlain of North Wales after his father, who was the previous Chamberlain.

He held the office until his death, with the exception of a short break in 1509, when he made way for Charles Brandon, later Duke of Suffolk. The Duke was brother-in-law of King Henry VIII by having married his sister Mary Tudor.

Brandon appointed him Deputy Justice of North Wales, describing him in the instrument of appointment as his blood relation. He joined the Duke during the Battle of the Spurs, and took part in the Siege of Thérouanne, which involved the Tudors and Habsburgs against the Kingdom of France.

He was made a Knight banneret at the Siege of Tournai in 1513. He kept close relationship with Sir Rhys ap Thomas, of the Welsh Royal House of Dinefwr, who also fought at the Battle of the Spurs with the King.

== Family ==
William Griffith married to Jane Stradling, daughter of Sir Thomas Stradling of St Donat's Castle, and then later to Jane Puleston, daughter of John Puleston. Griffith's mother-in-law remarried to Sir Rhys ap Thomas of Dinefwr, whose son, Griffith ap Rhys, was a companion at court.

By Jane Stradling he had a son, Rees Griffith, who became a High Sheriff, and a daughter, Margaret Griffith, who married Simon Thelwall. Another of his daughters by Jane was Elizabeth Griffith, who was married to Sir John Philipps. By Jane Puleston he had a daughter, Sibill Griffith, who married Owen ap Hugh. One of their sons, Edward Griffith, was a correspondent of Thomas Cromwell, and joined Sir William Brereton to Ireland for a military campaign, and was made a member of the Privy Council.

Brereton was later Groom of the Privy Chamber to Henry VIII, and was executed in relation to Queen Anne Boleyn adultery charges. Edward Griffith's daughter Eleanor married to Sir Nicholas Bagenal, Marshal of the royal Irish Army. Another daughter of William Griffith, Jane Griffith, became the mother of Elizabeth, who married John Yale, father of Chancellor David Yale.

William Griffith's great-great-grandmother was Morfydd, granddaughter of Tudur ap Goronwy, member of the Tudors of Penmynydd. Their family were allies and kinsmen of Prince Owain Glyndwr and Lord Tudur ap Gruffudd, of the Royal House of Mathrafal, during the Welsh war of independence.
