= William Griffith the Hael =

William Griffith the Hael (circa 1445 to circa 1540), of Penhryn Castle, was a Welsh politician and Chamberlain of North Wales sometime after 1466.

He became a Knight of Bath in 1489. He was also the Captain of Caernarfon Castle.

He was ordered by Henry VII of England to get rid of the use of Welsh surnames.

He married Jane Troutbeck, daughter of Sir William Troutbeck. He had a son, William Griffith, who became Chamberlain of North Wales after him.
