= Zupus =

Zupus may refer to:

- Giovanni Battista Zupi, Italian astronomer, mathematician, and Jesuit priest
- Zupu, Chinese clan register
- Zupus (crater), the lava-flooded remains of a lunar impact crater on a southwestern reach of the Oceanus Procellarum
