= Meanings of minor-planet names: 227001–228000 =

As minor planet discoveries are confirmed, they are given a permanent number by the IAU's Minor Planet Center (MPC), and the discoverers can then submit names for them, following the IAU's naming conventions. The list below concerns those minor planets in the specified number-range that have received names, and explains the meanings of those names.

Official naming citations of newly named small Solar System bodies are approved and published in a bulletin by IAU's Working Group for Small Bodies Nomenclature (WGSBN). Before May 2021, citations were published in MPC's Minor Planet Circulars for many decades. Recent citations can also be found on the JPL Small-Body Database (SBDB). Until his death in 2016, German astronomer Lutz D. Schmadel compiled these citations into the Dictionary of Minor Planet Names (DMP) and regularly updated the collection.

Based on Paul Herget's The Names of the Minor Planets, Schmadel also researched the unclear origin of numerous asteroids, most of which had been named prior to World War II. This article incorporates text from this source, which is in the public domain: SBDB New namings may only be added to this list below after official publication as the preannouncement of names is condemned. The WGSBN publishes a comprehensive guideline for the naming rules of non-cometary small Solar System bodies.

== 227001–227100 ==
Named minor planet	Provisional	This minor planet was named for...	Ref · Catalog
227033 Adamjmckay	2005 AM_{26}	Adam J. McKay (b. 1968), an American filmmaker and comedian.	IAU · 227033
227065 Romandia	2005 GQ_{9}	Romandy, the French-speaking part of Switzerland, by its Latin name "Romandia"	JPL · 227065

== 227101–227200 ==
back to top

Named minor planet	Provisional	This minor planet was named for...	Ref · Catalog
227147 Coggiajérôme	2005 PW_{5}	Jérôme Eugène Coggia (1849–1919), a French astronomer.	IAU · 227147
227151 Desargues	2005 PT_{16}	Girard Desargues (1591–1661), French mathematician and engineer	JPL · 227151
227152 Zupi	2005 PJ_{20}	Giovanni Battista Zupi (1590–1650), an Italian astronomer, mathematician, and Jesuit priest, who, in 1639, was first to note Mercury's planetary phases, alike the phases of Venus and the Lunar phase. The crater Zupus on the Moon is also named after him.	IAU · 227152

== 227201–227300 ==
back to top

Named minor planet	Provisional	This minor planet was named for...	Ref · Catalog
227218 Rényi	2005 RU_{3}	Alfréd Rényi (1921–1970), a Hungarian mathematician.	JPL · 227218

== 227301–227400 ==
back to top

Named minor planet	Provisional	This minor planet was named for...	Ref · Catalog
227310 Scottkardel	2005 TN_{29}	W. Scott Kardel (born 1962), for his service as the managing director of the International Dark Sky Association and his efforts to combat light pollution and protect the nighttime environment.	JPL · 227310
227326 Narodychi	2005 TB_{152}	Narodychi, a settlement located in northern Ukraine. It has been known since 1545. During the Chernobyl disaster in 1986, the urban-type settlement was seriously affected and recommended for evacuation. However, life in Narodychi goes on.	JPL · 227326

== 227401–227500 ==
back to top

Named minor planet	Provisional	This minor planet was named for...	Ref · Catalog
227427 Williamwren	2005 VX_{78}	William R. Wren, Special Assistant to the Superintendent, McDonald Observatory, Texas.	IAU · 227427

== 227501–227600 ==
back to top

Named minor planet	Provisional	This minor planet was named for...	Ref · Catalog
There are no named minor planets in this number range

== 227601–227700 ==
back to top

Named minor planet	Provisional	This minor planet was named for...	Ref · Catalog
227641 Nothomb	2006 BD_{99}	Amélie Nothomb (born 1967), a Belgian writer.	JPL · 227641

== 227701–227800 ==
back to top

Named minor planet	Provisional	This minor planet was named for...	Ref · Catalog
227711 Dailyminorplanet	2006 DP_{114}	The Daily Minor Planet is a project developed by the Catalina Sky Survey and hosted on the Zooniverse citizen science platform. This project has had thousands of volunteers discover numerous asteroids from archival images acquired from Catalina's G96, Mt. Lemmon survey.	JPL · 227711
227767 Enkibilal	2006 US_{62}	Enki Bilal (born 1951), a Serbian graphic novelist and film director. Born in Belgrade, he moved with his family to Paris in 1960, where he published his first story in Pilote magazine in 1972 and his first album in 1975. He received the Grand Prix at the 14th Angoulême festival in 1987.	JPL · 227767
227770 Wischnewski	2006 US_{289}	Erik Wischnewski (born 1952) has been a lecturer at adult education centers and planetaria since 1972 and is an author of several astronomical textbooks. His work contributes to the German-language astronomical education.	JPL · 227770

== 227801–227900 ==
back to top

Named minor planet	Provisional	This minor planet was named for...	Ref · Catalog
There are no named minor planets in this number range

== 227901–228000 ==
back to top

Named minor planet	Provisional	This minor planet was named for...	Ref · Catalog
227928 Ludoferrière	2007 GT_{1}	Ludovic Ferrière (b. 1982), a geologist known for his research on and discoveries of new meteorite impact craters on Earth.	IAU · 227928
227930 Athos	2007 GG_{6}	Athos, a fictional character in the novels The Three Musketeers, Twenty Years After and The Vicomte de Bragelonne by Alexandre Dumas	JPL · 227930
227962 Aramis	2007 HQ_{14}	Aramis, a fictional character in Dumas' The Three Musketeers and its sequels. The character is loosely based on the historical musketeer Henri d'Aramitz. (Also see 229737 Porthos.)	JPL · 227962
227997 NIGLAS	2007 KU_{7}	The Nanjing Institute of Geography & Limnology, Chinese Academy of Sciences (NIGLAS) was established in 1940. It is the only national institute devoted to lake-basin system research and has made enormous contributions to environmental remediation and regional development.	IAU · 227997

back to top

Preceded by 226,001–227,000	Meanings of minor-planet names List of minor planets: 227,001–228,000	Succeeded by 228,001–229,000
