= Zupus (crater) =

Crater on the Moon

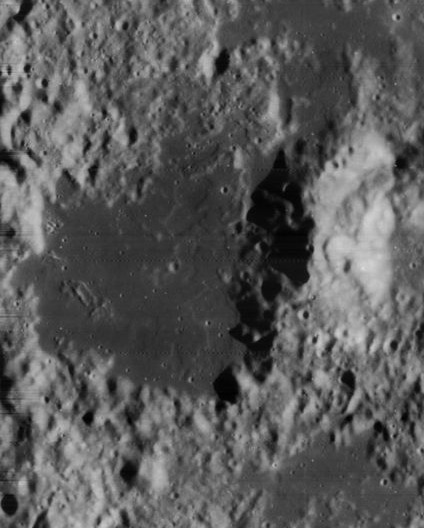
- Lunar Orbiter 4 image
- Coordinates: 17.2°S 52.3°W
- Diameter: 38 km
- Depth: None
- Colongitude: 52° at sunrise
- Eponym: Giovanni B. Zupi

Zupus is the lava-flooded remains of a lunar impact crater. It is located on a southwestern reach of the Oceanus Procellarum, to the northwest of Mare Humorum. To the north-northeast is the flooded crater Billy, and some distance to the southeast is Mersenius. A system of faint rilles named the Rimae Zupus lie to the northwest, following a course to the north-northwest towards the mare.

Little remains of the original formation, and the rim is low and irregular in outline, giving the feature the appearance of a valley. This rim climbs to a maximum height of 1.3 km above the base. The crater Zupus S intrudes upon the eastern rim. A faint ghost crater lies in the mare to the northeast. The mare covering the floor of Zupus is darker in hue than the surrounding terrain, making the feature relatively easy for an observer to locate.

== Satellite craters ==
By convention these features are identified on lunar maps by placing the letter on the side of the crater midpoint that is closest to Zupus.

Zupus	Latitude	Longitude	Diameter
A	17.2° S	53.5° W	6 km
B	17.6° S	54.3° W	6 km
C	17.3° S	55.1° W	19 km
D	19.7° S	53.4° W	17 km
F	17.3° S	54.0° W	4 km
K	15.7° S	52.1° W	17 km
S	17.0° S	51.3° W	24 km
V	18.2° S	56.3° W	4 km
X	18.9° S	54.9° W	5 km
Y	17.4° S	49.6° W	2 km
Z	18.2° S	50.1° W	3 km

== See also ==
- Asteroid 227152 Zupi
