= List of minor planets: 227001–228000 =

The following is a partial list of minor planets, running from minor-planet number 227001 through 228000, inclusive. The primary data for this and other partial lists is based on JPL's "Small-Body Orbital Elements" and data available from the Minor Planet Center. Critical list information is also provided by the MPC, unless otherwise specified from Lowell Observatory. A detailed description of the table's columns and additional sources are given on the main page including a complete list of every page in this series, and a statistical break-up on the dynamical classification of minor planets.

Also see the summary list of all named bodies in numerical and alphabetical order, and the corresponding naming citations for the number range of this particular list. New namings may only be added to this list after official publication, as the preannouncement of names is condemned by the Working Group for Small Bodies Nomenclature of the International Astronomical Union.

Near-Earth obj.	MBA (inner)	MBA (outer)	Centaur
Mars-crosser	MBA (middle)	Jupiter trojan	Trans-Neptunian obj.
Unclassified

== 227001–227100 ==
Designation			Discovery			Properties		Ref
Permanent	Provisional	Named after	Date	Site	Discoverer(s)	Category	Diam.	Ref
227001	2004 XV_{80}	—	December 10, 2004	Socorro	LINEAR	EOS	3.5 km	MPC · JPL
227002	2004 XQ_{88}	—	December 10, 2004	Socorro	LINEAR	·	5.0 km	MPC · JPL
227003	2004 XF_{89}	—	December 10, 2004	Campo Imperatore	CINEOS	·	4.5 km	MPC · JPL
227004	2004 XA_{97}	—	December 11, 2004	Kitt Peak	Spacewatch	·	3.9 km	MPC · JPL
227005	2004 XR_{100}	—	December 14, 2004	Socorro	LINEAR	·	5.9 km	MPC · JPL
227006	2004 XC_{102}	—	December 10, 2004	Socorro	LINEAR	·	5.1 km	MPC · JPL
227007	2004 XO_{114}	—	December 10, 2004	Anderson Mesa	LONEOS	·	4.0 km	MPC · JPL
227008	2004 XZ_{115}	—	December 12, 2004	Kitt Peak	Spacewatch	·	4.3 km	MPC · JPL
227009	2004 XF_{121}	—	December 14, 2004	Socorro	LINEAR	URS	6.1 km	MPC · JPL
227010	2004 XD_{124}	—	December 10, 2004	Socorro	LINEAR	·	4.3 km	MPC · JPL
227011	2004 XY_{125}	—	December 11, 2004	Catalina	CSS	·	2.3 km	MPC · JPL
227012	2004 XJ_{129}	—	December 14, 2004	Catalina	CSS	·	4.9 km	MPC · JPL
227013	2004 XP_{132}	—	December 13, 2004	Catalina	CSS	·	3.3 km	MPC · JPL
227014	2004 XU_{133}	—	December 15, 2004	Socorro	LINEAR	·	3.7 km	MPC · JPL
227015	2004 XN_{135}	—	December 15, 2004	Socorro	LINEAR	·	4.9 km	MPC · JPL
227016	2004 XC_{137}	—	December 15, 2004	Socorro	LINEAR	EOS	3.7 km	MPC · JPL
227017	2004 XM_{137}	—	December 15, 2004	Socorro	LINEAR	·	4.2 km	MPC · JPL
227018	2004 XZ_{142}	—	December 9, 2004	Kitt Peak	Spacewatch	·	4.2 km	MPC · JPL
227019	2004 XN_{149}	—	December 15, 2004	Kitt Peak	Spacewatch	THM	3.0 km	MPC · JPL
227020	2004 XS_{155}	—	December 12, 2004	Kitt Peak	Spacewatch	·	2.4 km	MPC · JPL
227021	2004 XA_{168}	—	December 3, 2004	Kitt Peak	Spacewatch	HYG	4.8 km	MPC · JPL
227022	2004 XG_{177}	—	December 11, 2004	Kitt Peak	Spacewatch	·	4.0 km	MPC · JPL
227023	2004 XG_{180}	—	December 14, 2004	Socorro	LINEAR	·	4.8 km	MPC · JPL
227024	2004 YC_{1}	—	December 16, 2004	Catalina	CSS	·	5.4 km	MPC · JPL
227025	2004 YK_{24}	—	December 16, 2004	Kitt Peak	Spacewatch	·	2.4 km	MPC · JPL
227026	2004 YA_{26}	—	December 19, 2004	Mount Lemmon	Mount Lemmon Survey	·	3.8 km	MPC · JPL
227027	2004 YZ_{30}	—	December 18, 2004	Socorro	LINEAR	·	7.7 km	MPC · JPL
227028	2005 AD_{10}	—	January 7, 2005	Socorro	LINEAR	H	860 m	MPC · JPL
227029	2005 AB_{15}	—	January 6, 2005	Catalina	CSS	·	4.0 km	MPC · JPL
227030	2005 AO_{16}	—	January 6, 2005	Socorro	LINEAR	·	3.9 km	MPC · JPL
227031	2005 AW_{22}	—	January 7, 2005	Socorro	LINEAR	·	3.3 km	MPC · JPL
227032	2005 AU_{25}	—	January 11, 2005	Socorro	LINEAR	·	2.8 km	MPC · JPL
227033 Adamjmckay	2005 AM_{26}	Adamjmckay	January 11, 2005	Wise	Wise	HYG	3.9 km	MPC · JPL
227034	2005 AK_{27}	—	January 13, 2005	Socorro	LINEAR	H	870 m	MPC · JPL
227035	2005 AG_{35}	—	January 13, 2005	Socorro	LINEAR	·	4.8 km	MPC · JPL
227036	2005 AR_{45}	—	January 13, 2005	Kitt Peak	Spacewatch	H	730 m	MPC · JPL
227037	2005 AX_{51}	—	January 13, 2005	Kitt Peak	Spacewatch	·	5.1 km	MPC · JPL
227038	2005 AU_{54}	—	January 15, 2005	Catalina	CSS	·	6.9 km	MPC · JPL
227039	2005 AU_{73}	—	January 15, 2005	Kitt Peak	Spacewatch	THM	4.0 km	MPC · JPL
227040	2005 AZ_{81}	—	January 15, 2005	Socorro	LINEAR	·	3.3 km	MPC · JPL
227041	2005 AL_{82}	—	January 13, 2005	Kitt Peak	Spacewatch	·	3.8 km	MPC · JPL
227042	2005 BO_{2}	—	January 16, 2005	Socorro	LINEAR	H	670 m	MPC · JPL
227043	2005 BF_{18}	—	January 16, 2005	Socorro	LINEAR	·	6.0 km	MPC · JPL
227044	2005 BU_{23}	—	January 17, 2005	Kitt Peak	Spacewatch	·	6.3 km	MPC · JPL
227045	2005 BZ_{27}	—	January 20, 2005	Anderson Mesa	LONEOS	H	720 m	MPC · JPL
227046	2005 BE_{29}	—	January 31, 2005	Palomar	NEAT	·	4.7 km	MPC · JPL
227047	2005 CH	—	February 1, 2005	Catalina	CSS	·	4.1 km	MPC · JPL
227048	2005 CQ_{4}	—	February 1, 2005	Kitt Peak	Spacewatch	·	3.2 km	MPC · JPL
227049	2005 CN_{7}	—	February 4, 2005	Socorro	LINEAR	T_{j} (2.99)	5.6 km	MPC · JPL
227050	2005 CB_{22}	—	February 3, 2005	Socorro	LINEAR	·	3.9 km	MPC · JPL
227051	2005 CY_{25}	—	February 5, 2005	Uccle	T. Pauwels	·	4.9 km	MPC · JPL
227052	2005 CK_{45}	—	February 2, 2005	Kitt Peak	Spacewatch	·	1.6 km	MPC · JPL
227053	2005 CP_{76}	—	February 4, 2005	Palomar	NEAT	·	5.2 km	MPC · JPL
227054	2005 EH_{38}	—	March 1, 2005	Catalina	CSS	H	780 m	MPC · JPL
227055	2005 EE_{39}	—	March 7, 2005	Goodricke-Pigott	R. A. Tucker	·	4.7 km	MPC · JPL
227056	2005 EJ_{45}	—	March 3, 2005	Catalina	CSS	THM	2.9 km	MPC · JPL
227057	2005 ER_{93}	—	March 8, 2005	Socorro	LINEAR	·	6.1 km	MPC · JPL
227058	2005 EA_{119}	—	March 7, 2005	Socorro	LINEAR	(1298)	5.4 km	MPC · JPL
227059	2005 EW_{153}	—	March 9, 2005	Catalina	CSS	H	870 m	MPC · JPL
227060	2005 EB_{202}	—	March 8, 2005	Catalina	CSS	T_{j} (2.98) · EUP	4.9 km	MPC · JPL
227061	2005 EK_{209}	—	March 4, 2005	Catalina	CSS	EUP	6.3 km	MPC · JPL
227062	2005 EX_{262}	—	March 13, 2005	Kitt Peak	Spacewatch	3:2	7.8 km	MPC · JPL
227063	2005 EM_{291}	—	March 10, 2005	Catalina	CSS	HYG	4.7 km	MPC · JPL
227064	2005 FB_{7}	—	March 30, 2005	Catalina	CSS	·	3.1 km	MPC · JPL
227065 Romandia	2005 GQ_{9}	Romandia	April 1, 2005	Vicques	M. Ory	3:2	9.5 km	MPC · JPL
227066	2005 GB_{26}	—	April 2, 2005	Mount Lemmon	Mount Lemmon Survey	·	1.6 km	MPC · JPL
227067	2005 GC_{32}	—	April 4, 2005	Mount Lemmon	Mount Lemmon Survey	·	850 m	MPC · JPL
227068	2005 GX_{92}	—	April 6, 2005	Mount Lemmon	Mount Lemmon Survey	·	900 m	MPC · JPL
227069	2005 GK_{180}	—	April 12, 2005	Anderson Mesa	LONEOS	H	730 m	MPC · JPL
227070	2005 HV_{1}	—	April 16, 2005	Kitt Peak	Spacewatch	·	1.0 km	MPC · JPL
227071	2005 JF_{42}	—	May 8, 2005	Kitt Peak	Spacewatch	NYS	1.1 km	MPC · JPL
227072	2005 JV_{43}	—	May 3, 2005	Kitt Peak	Spacewatch	·	920 m	MPC · JPL
227073	2005 JO_{73}	—	May 8, 2005	Kitt Peak	Spacewatch	·	910 m	MPC · JPL
227074	2005 JG_{89}	—	May 11, 2005	Kitt Peak	Spacewatch	3:2 · SHU	8.3 km	MPC · JPL
227075	2005 JQ_{104}	—	May 10, 2005	Catalina	CSS	·	830 m	MPC · JPL
227076	2005 JT_{144}	—	May 15, 2005	Mount Lemmon	Mount Lemmon Survey	·	720 m	MPC · JPL
227077	2005 LT_{18}	—	June 8, 2005	Kitt Peak	Spacewatch	L4	9.8 km	MPC · JPL
227078	2005 LZ_{18}	—	June 8, 2005	Kitt Peak	Spacewatch	L4	10 km	MPC · JPL
227079	2005 LD_{20}	—	June 4, 2005	Kitt Peak	Spacewatch	·	690 m	MPC · JPL
227080	2005 LK_{30}	—	June 12, 2005	Kitt Peak	Spacewatch	·	850 m	MPC · JPL
227081	2005 LM_{32}	—	June 9, 2005	Kitt Peak	Spacewatch	·	1.4 km	MPC · JPL
227082	2005 LY_{49}	—	June 11, 2005	Kitt Peak	Spacewatch	L4	10 km	MPC · JPL
227083	2005 LV_{51}	—	June 14, 2005	Mount Lemmon	Mount Lemmon Survey	·	730 m	MPC · JPL
227084	2005 LA_{53}	—	June 13, 2005	Mount Lemmon	Mount Lemmon Survey	MAS	810 m	MPC · JPL
227085	2005 MZ	—	June 17, 2005	Mount Lemmon	Mount Lemmon Survey	MAS	760 m	MPC · JPL
227086	2005 MY_{2}	—	June 18, 2005	Mount Lemmon	Mount Lemmon Survey	·	1 km	MPC · JPL
227087	2005 ME_{8}	—	June 27, 2005	Kitt Peak	Spacewatch	·	1.1 km	MPC · JPL
227088	2005 MJ_{9}	—	June 28, 2005	Kitt Peak	Spacewatch	·	850 m	MPC · JPL
227089	2005 MX_{10}	—	June 27, 2005	Kitt Peak	Spacewatch	·	740 m	MPC · JPL
227090	2005 MU_{17}	—	June 27, 2005	Kitt Peak	Spacewatch	NYS	1.2 km	MPC · JPL
227091	2005 MC_{21}	—	June 30, 2005	Palomar	NEAT	·	820 m	MPC · JPL
227092	2005 MM_{21}	—	June 30, 2005	Kitt Peak	Spacewatch	NYS	1.4 km	MPC · JPL
227093	2005 MZ_{25}	—	June 27, 2005	Campo Imperatore	CINEOS	NYS	960 m	MPC · JPL
227094	2005 MF_{30}	—	June 29, 2005	Kitt Peak	Spacewatch	·	1.0 km	MPC · JPL
227095	2005 MR_{36}	—	June 30, 2005	Kitt Peak	Spacewatch	·	730 m	MPC · JPL
227096	2005 MU_{36}	—	June 30, 2005	Kitt Peak	Spacewatch	·	820 m	MPC · JPL
227097	2005 MV_{36}	—	June 30, 2005	Kitt Peak	Spacewatch	NYS	1.2 km	MPC · JPL
227098	2005 MU_{42}	—	June 29, 2005	Palomar	NEAT	·	1.1 km	MPC · JPL
227099	2005 MR_{49}	—	June 30, 2005	Kitt Peak	Spacewatch	·	1.0 km	MPC · JPL
227100	2005 MM_{50}	—	June 30, 2005	Kitt Peak	Spacewatch	·	1.3 km	MPC · JPL

== 227101–227200 ==
back to top

Designation			Discovery			Properties		Ref
Permanent	Provisional	Named after	Date	Site	Discoverer(s)	Category	Diam.	Ref
227101	2005 NW_{13}	—	July 5, 2005	Kitt Peak	Spacewatch	·	1.1 km	MPC · JPL
227102	2005 NH_{20}	—	July 4, 2005	Socorro	LINEAR	·	1.2 km	MPC · JPL
227103	2005 NX_{24}	—	July 4, 2005	Kitt Peak	Spacewatch	·	1.9 km	MPC · JPL
227104	2005 NO_{26}	—	July 5, 2005	Mount Lemmon	Mount Lemmon Survey	·	1.1 km	MPC · JPL
227105	2005 NW_{28}	—	July 5, 2005	Palomar	NEAT	·	2.3 km	MPC · JPL
227106	2005 NL_{35}	—	July 5, 2005	Kitt Peak	Spacewatch	·	1.2 km	MPC · JPL
227107	2005 ND_{36}	—	July 5, 2005	Mount Lemmon	Mount Lemmon Survey	·	790 m	MPC · JPL
227108	2005 NH_{36}	—	July 5, 2005	Palomar	NEAT	·	1.3 km	MPC · JPL
227109	2005 ND_{43}	—	July 5, 2005	Palomar	NEAT	·	780 m	MPC · JPL
227110	2005 NT_{48}	—	July 9, 2005	Kitt Peak	Spacewatch	NYS	1.9 km	MPC · JPL
227111	2005 NH_{52}	—	July 10, 2005	Catalina	CSS	·	990 m	MPC · JPL
227112	2005 NG_{54}	—	July 10, 2005	Kitt Peak	Spacewatch	·	780 m	MPC · JPL
227113	2005 NM_{55}	—	July 7, 2005	Reedy Creek	J. Broughton	·	1.9 km	MPC · JPL
227114	2005 NP_{57}	—	July 5, 2005	Mount Lemmon	Mount Lemmon Survey	·	1.3 km	MPC · JPL
227115	2005 NW_{61}	—	July 11, 2005	Kitt Peak	Spacewatch	NYS	1.1 km	MPC · JPL
227116	2005 NM_{64}	—	July 1, 2005	Kitt Peak	Spacewatch	·	2.1 km	MPC · JPL
227117	2005 NU_{64}	—	July 1, 2005	Kitt Peak	Spacewatch	·	1.3 km	MPC · JPL
227118	2005 NL_{77}	—	July 10, 2005	Kitt Peak	Spacewatch	·	1.0 km	MPC · JPL
227119	2005 ND_{85}	—	July 3, 2005	Apache Point	Apache Point	·	1.5 km	MPC · JPL
227120	2005 NE_{85}	—	July 3, 2005	Catalina	CSS	PHO	1.8 km	MPC · JPL
227121	2005 NA_{122}	—	July 4, 2005	Palomar	NEAT	V	960 m	MPC · JPL
227122	2005 NW_{122}	—	July 4, 2005	Palomar	NEAT	·	1.7 km	MPC · JPL
227123	2005 NR_{123}	—	July 12, 2005	Kitt Peak	Spacewatch	CLA	1.9 km	MPC · JPL
227124	2005 OE_{2}	—	July 26, 2005	Reedy Creek	J. Broughton	·	1.6 km	MPC · JPL
227125	2005 ON_{3}	—	July 26, 2005	Reedy Creek	J. Broughton	·	1.5 km	MPC · JPL
227126	2005 OP_{4}	—	July 27, 2005	Palomar	NEAT	·	1.4 km	MPC · JPL
227127	2005 OB_{6}	—	July 28, 2005	Palomar	NEAT	MAR	1.5 km	MPC · JPL
227128	2005 OJ_{7}	—	July 28, 2005	Palomar	NEAT	·	1.5 km	MPC · JPL
227129	2005 OE_{9}	—	July 26, 2005	Palomar	NEAT	ERI	2.3 km	MPC · JPL
227130	2005 OT_{9}	—	July 27, 2005	Palomar	NEAT	·	1.0 km	MPC · JPL
227131	2005 OB_{10}	—	July 27, 2005	Palomar	NEAT	MAS	830 m	MPC · JPL
227132	2005 OJ_{10}	—	July 27, 2005	Palomar	NEAT	·	1.4 km	MPC · JPL
227133	2005 OR_{11}	—	July 29, 2005	Palomar	NEAT	·	2.1 km	MPC · JPL
227134	2005 OR_{12}	—	July 29, 2005	Palomar	NEAT	·	1.6 km	MPC · JPL
227135	2005 OE_{13}	—	July 29, 2005	Palomar	NEAT	·	1.6 km	MPC · JPL
227136	2005 OL_{14}	—	July 31, 2005	Siding Spring	SSS	NYS	1.3 km	MPC · JPL
227137	2005 OE_{15}	—	July 29, 2005	Reedy Creek	J. Broughton	NYS	1.3 km	MPC · JPL
227138	2005 OH_{15}	—	July 30, 2005	Reedy Creek	J. Broughton	·	1.1 km	MPC · JPL
227139	2005 OG_{26}	—	July 29, 2005	Palomar	NEAT	·	970 m	MPC · JPL
227140	2005 OT_{27}	—	July 28, 2005	Palomar	NEAT	fast	2.0 km	MPC · JPL
227141	2005 PJ	—	August 1, 2005	Eskridge	Farpoint	MAS	880 m	MPC · JPL
227142	2005 PL_{1}	—	August 1, 2005	Siding Spring	SSS	NYS	1.5 km	MPC · JPL
227143	2005 PT_{1}	—	August 1, 2005	Siding Spring	SSS	·	1.6 km	MPC · JPL
227144	2005 PG_{2}	—	August 4, 2005	Črni Vrh	Mikuž, H.	(2076)	1.1 km	MPC · JPL
227145	2005 PX_{2}	—	August 2, 2005	Socorro	LINEAR	·	1.2 km	MPC · JPL
227146	2005 PB_{3}	—	August 2, 2005	Socorro	LINEAR	NYS	1.2 km	MPC · JPL
227147 Coggiajérôme	2005 PW_{5}	Coggiajérôme	August 10, 2005	Vicques	M. Ory	·	1.4 km	MPC · JPL
227148	2005 PW_{10}	—	August 4, 2005	Palomar	NEAT	NYS	1.4 km	MPC · JPL
227149	2005 PE_{14}	—	August 4, 2005	Palomar	NEAT	·	1.2 km	MPC · JPL
227150	2005 PM_{15}	—	August 4, 2005	Palomar	NEAT	·	1.2 km	MPC · JPL
227151 Desargues	2005 PT_{16}	Desargues	August 10, 2005	Saint-Sulpice	B. Christophe	MAS	780 m	MPC · JPL
227152 Zupi	2005 PJ_{20}	Zupi	August 5, 2005	Vallemare Borbona	V. S. Casulli	·	1.2 km	MPC · JPL
227153	2005 PQ_{23}	—	August 9, 2005	Socorro	LINEAR	PHO	1.6 km	MPC · JPL
227154	2005 QQ_{1}	—	August 22, 2005	Palomar	NEAT	NYS	1.1 km	MPC · JPL
227155	2005 QD_{6}	—	August 24, 2005	Palomar	NEAT	·	1.2 km	MPC · JPL
227156	2005 QY_{8}	—	August 25, 2005	Palomar	NEAT	NYS	1.4 km	MPC · JPL
227157	2005 QR_{10}	—	August 26, 2005	Campo Imperatore	CINEOS	·	1.9 km	MPC · JPL
227158	2005 QW_{11}	—	August 22, 2005	Siding Spring	SSS	ERI	2.8 km	MPC · JPL
227159	2005 QZ_{11}	—	August 24, 2005	Palomar	NEAT	(5)	1.7 km	MPC · JPL
227160	2005 QP_{13}	—	August 24, 2005	Palomar	NEAT	·	1.6 km	MPC · JPL
227161	2005 QT_{13}	—	August 24, 2005	Palomar	NEAT	·	1.5 km	MPC · JPL
227162	2005 QH_{15}	—	August 25, 2005	Palomar	NEAT	NYS	1.2 km	MPC · JPL
227163	2005 QE_{18}	—	August 25, 2005	Palomar	NEAT	·	1.4 km	MPC · JPL
227164	2005 QX_{23}	—	August 27, 2005	Kitt Peak	Spacewatch	NYS	1.1 km	MPC · JPL
227165	2005 QK_{35}	—	August 25, 2005	Palomar	NEAT	·	1.7 km	MPC · JPL
227166	2005 QD_{36}	—	August 25, 2005	Palomar	NEAT	·	1.4 km	MPC · JPL
227167	2005 QJ_{36}	—	August 25, 2005	Palomar	NEAT	ERI	1.8 km	MPC · JPL
227168	2005 QL_{36}	—	August 25, 2005	Palomar	NEAT	NYS	1.3 km	MPC · JPL
227169	2005 QB_{37}	—	August 25, 2005	Palomar	NEAT	·	2.1 km	MPC · JPL
227170	2005 QQ_{38}	—	August 25, 2005	Campo Imperatore	CINEOS	·	1.6 km	MPC · JPL
227171	2005 QF_{41}	—	August 26, 2005	Anderson Mesa	LONEOS	·	2.4 km	MPC · JPL
227172	2005 QP_{41}	—	August 26, 2005	Anderson Mesa	LONEOS	·	1.3 km	MPC · JPL
227173	2005 QT_{41}	—	August 26, 2005	Anderson Mesa	LONEOS	·	1.4 km	MPC · JPL
227174	2005 QU_{41}	—	August 26, 2005	Anderson Mesa	LONEOS	·	960 m	MPC · JPL
227175	2005 QP_{42}	—	August 26, 2005	Anderson Mesa	LONEOS	MAS	970 m	MPC · JPL
227176	2005 QW_{43}	—	August 26, 2005	Palomar	NEAT	·	1.1 km	MPC · JPL
227177	2005 QY_{45}	—	August 26, 2005	Palomar	NEAT	·	1.4 km	MPC · JPL
227178	2005 QX_{46}	—	August 26, 2005	Palomar	NEAT	·	2.3 km	MPC · JPL
227179	2005 QL_{48}	—	August 26, 2005	Palomar	NEAT	NYS	1.5 km	MPC · JPL
227180	2005 QU_{49}	—	August 26, 2005	Palomar	NEAT	·	1.8 km	MPC · JPL
227181	2005 QU_{50}	—	August 26, 2005	Palomar	NEAT	NYS	1.1 km	MPC · JPL
227182	2005 QW_{52}	—	August 27, 2005	Siding Spring	SSS	·	1.1 km	MPC · JPL
227183	2005 QG_{54}	—	August 28, 2005	Kitt Peak	Spacewatch	NYS	1.4 km	MPC · JPL
227184	2005 QZ_{54}	—	August 28, 2005	Anderson Mesa	LONEOS	MAS	880 m	MPC · JPL
227185	2005 QL_{55}	—	August 28, 2005	Kitt Peak	Spacewatch	·	1.5 km	MPC · JPL
227186	2005 QV_{55}	—	August 28, 2005	Kitt Peak	Spacewatch	NYS	1.5 km	MPC · JPL
227187	2005 QL_{57}	—	August 24, 2005	Palomar	NEAT	NYS	1.5 km	MPC · JPL
227188	2005 QH_{60}	—	August 26, 2005	Palomar	NEAT	V	970 m	MPC · JPL
227189	2005 QS_{67}	—	August 28, 2005	Kitt Peak	Spacewatch	NYS	1.1 km	MPC · JPL
227190	2005 QA_{68}	—	August 28, 2005	Siding Spring	SSS	·	1.1 km	MPC · JPL
227191	2005 QZ_{68}	—	August 28, 2005	Siding Spring	SSS	·	1.8 km	MPC · JPL
227192	2005 QT_{69}	—	August 29, 2005	Kitt Peak	Spacewatch	·	1.1 km	MPC · JPL
227193	2005 QS_{70}	—	August 29, 2005	Socorro	LINEAR	NYS	1.7 km	MPC · JPL
227194	2005 QE_{72}	—	August 29, 2005	Anderson Mesa	LONEOS	·	1.3 km	MPC · JPL
227195	2005 QT_{74}	—	August 29, 2005	Anderson Mesa	LONEOS	·	1.4 km	MPC · JPL
227196	2005 QW_{76}	—	August 29, 2005	Vail-Jarnac	Jarnac	·	1.5 km	MPC · JPL
227197	2005 QK_{78}	—	August 25, 2005	Palomar	NEAT	·	1.5 km	MPC · JPL
227198	2005 QG_{82}	—	August 29, 2005	Anderson Mesa	LONEOS	V	860 m	MPC · JPL
227199	2005 QS_{95}	—	August 27, 2005	Palomar	NEAT	·	1.4 km	MPC · JPL
227200	2005 QQ_{97}	—	August 27, 2005	Palomar	NEAT	NYS	1.5 km	MPC · JPL

== 227201–227300 ==
back to top

Designation			Discovery			Properties		Ref
Permanent	Provisional	Named after	Date	Site	Discoverer(s)	Category	Diam.	Ref
227201	2005 QY_{103}	—	August 27, 2005	Palomar	NEAT	·	1.4 km	MPC · JPL
227202	2005 QG_{107}	—	August 27, 2005	Palomar	NEAT	·	1.3 km	MPC · JPL
227203	2005 QY_{111}	—	August 27, 2005	Palomar	NEAT	·	2.0 km	MPC · JPL
227204	2005 QZ_{119}	—	August 28, 2005	Kitt Peak	Spacewatch	·	1.0 km	MPC · JPL
227205	2005 QM_{139}	—	August 28, 2005	Kitt Peak	Spacewatch	NYS	1.2 km	MPC · JPL
227206	2005 QC_{145}	—	August 27, 2005	Palomar	NEAT	·	1.8 km	MPC · JPL
227207	2005 QK_{145}	—	August 27, 2005	Anderson Mesa	LONEOS	ERI	2.4 km	MPC · JPL
227208	2005 QD_{148}	—	August 28, 2005	Siding Spring	SSS	·	1.2 km	MPC · JPL
227209	2005 QC_{150}	—	August 27, 2005	Kitt Peak	Spacewatch	·	1.5 km	MPC · JPL
227210	2005 QH_{152}	—	August 31, 2005	Kitt Peak	Spacewatch	·	2.1 km	MPC · JPL
227211	2005 QB_{156}	—	August 30, 2005	Palomar	NEAT	PHO	3.6 km	MPC · JPL
227212	2005 QN_{159}	—	August 28, 2005	Anderson Mesa	LONEOS	·	2.6 km	MPC · JPL
227213	2005 QP_{164}	—	August 31, 2005	Palomar	NEAT	·	3.1 km	MPC · JPL
227214	2005 QU_{177}	—	August 31, 2005	Anderson Mesa	LONEOS	NYS	1.5 km	MPC · JPL
227215	2005 QK_{178}	—	August 26, 2005	Palomar	NEAT	V	830 m	MPC · JPL
227216	2005 QA_{179}	—	August 24, 2005	Palomar	NEAT	·	1.5 km	MPC · JPL
227217	2005 QR_{182}	—	August 31, 2005	Kitt Peak	Spacewatch	·	830 m	MPC · JPL
227218 Rényi	2005 RU_{3}	Rényi	September 5, 2005	Piszkéstető	K. Sárneczky	MAS	900 m	MPC · JPL
227219	2005 RZ_{4}	—	September 7, 2005	Uccle	T. Pauwels	NYS	1.3 km	MPC · JPL
227220	2005 RQ_{7}	—	September 8, 2005	Socorro	LINEAR	NYS	1.4 km	MPC · JPL
227221	2005 RH_{8}	—	September 8, 2005	Socorro	LINEAR	·	2.1 km	MPC · JPL
227222	2005 RL_{10}	—	September 8, 2005	Socorro	LINEAR	·	1.6 km	MPC · JPL
227223	2005 RA_{21}	—	September 1, 2005	Campo Imperatore	CINEOS	·	1.4 km	MPC · JPL
227224	2005 RY_{21}	—	September 6, 2005	Socorro	LINEAR	·	1.2 km	MPC · JPL
227225	2005 RG_{26}	—	September 12, 2005	Vail-Jarnac	Jarnac	·	1.3 km	MPC · JPL
227226	2005 RV_{29}	—	September 8, 2005	Socorro	LINEAR	MAS	860 m	MPC · JPL
227227	2005 RW_{29}	—	September 8, 2005	Socorro	LINEAR	NYS ·	1.3 km	MPC · JPL
227228	2005 RA_{33}	—	September 11, 2005	Socorro	LINEAR	·	2.0 km	MPC · JPL
227229	2005 RE_{40}	—	September 5, 2005	Catalina	CSS	MAS	880 m	MPC · JPL
227230	2005 RZ_{40}	—	September 12, 2005	Kitt Peak	Spacewatch	·	1.3 km	MPC · JPL
227231	2005 RJ_{42}	—	September 14, 2005	Kitt Peak	Spacewatch	·	1.4 km	MPC · JPL
227232	2005 SX_{2}	—	September 23, 2005	Catalina	CSS	NYS	2.0 km	MPC · JPL
227233	2005 SH_{5}	—	September 23, 2005	Catalina	CSS	NYS	1.3 km	MPC · JPL
227234	2005 SR_{5}	—	September 23, 2005	Catalina	CSS	NYS	1.6 km	MPC · JPL
227235	2005 SD_{6}	—	September 23, 2005	Kitt Peak	Spacewatch	·	1.4 km	MPC · JPL
227236	2005 SW_{7}	—	September 25, 2005	Catalina	CSS	·	2.2 km	MPC · JPL
227237	2005 SR_{22}	—	September 23, 2005	Kitt Peak	Spacewatch	·	1.4 km	MPC · JPL
227238	2005 SL_{28}	—	September 23, 2005	Kitt Peak	Spacewatch	·	1.5 km	MPC · JPL
227239	2005 SG_{30}	—	September 23, 2005	Kitt Peak	Spacewatch	MAS	920 m	MPC · JPL
227240	2005 SW_{32}	—	September 23, 2005	Kitt Peak	Spacewatch	NYS	1.4 km	MPC · JPL
227241	2005 SU_{34}	—	September 23, 2005	Kitt Peak	Spacewatch	·	1.5 km	MPC · JPL
227242	2005 SG_{35}	—	September 23, 2005	Kitt Peak	Spacewatch	NYS	1.4 km	MPC · JPL
227243	2005 SH_{36}	—	September 24, 2005	Kitt Peak	Spacewatch	·	1.3 km	MPC · JPL
227244	2005 SL_{36}	—	September 24, 2005	Kitt Peak	Spacewatch	·	1.6 km	MPC · JPL
227245	2005 SG_{42}	—	September 24, 2005	Kitt Peak	Spacewatch	·	2.1 km	MPC · JPL
227246	2005 SF_{46}	—	September 24, 2005	Kitt Peak	Spacewatch	·	1.7 km	MPC · JPL
227247	2005 SC_{50}	—	September 24, 2005	Kitt Peak	Spacewatch	fast	1.5 km	MPC · JPL
227248	2005 SJ_{54}	—	September 25, 2005	Kitt Peak	Spacewatch	MAS	1.1 km	MPC · JPL
227249	2005 SU_{54}	—	September 25, 2005	Kitt Peak	Spacewatch	·	1.1 km	MPC · JPL
227250	2005 ST_{59}	—	September 26, 2005	Kitt Peak	Spacewatch	NYS	1.3 km	MPC · JPL
227251	2005 SJ_{64}	—	September 26, 2005	Kitt Peak	Spacewatch	·	1.8 km	MPC · JPL
227252	2005 SZ_{74}	—	September 24, 2005	Kitt Peak	Spacewatch	·	1.7 km	MPC · JPL
227253	2005 SW_{75}	—	September 24, 2005	Kitt Peak	Spacewatch	·	1.1 km	MPC · JPL
227254	2005 SY_{76}	—	September 24, 2005	Kitt Peak	Spacewatch	·	2.1 km	MPC · JPL
227255	2005 SB_{78}	—	September 24, 2005	Kitt Peak	Spacewatch	NYS	980 m	MPC · JPL
227256	2005 SS_{79}	—	September 24, 2005	Kitt Peak	Spacewatch	·	1.3 km	MPC · JPL
227257	2005 SD_{82}	—	September 24, 2005	Kitt Peak	Spacewatch	·	1.5 km	MPC · JPL
227258	2005 SV_{83}	—	September 24, 2005	Kitt Peak	Spacewatch	·	1.4 km	MPC · JPL
227259	2005 SR_{91}	—	September 24, 2005	Kitt Peak	Spacewatch	·	1.5 km	MPC · JPL
227260	2005 SF_{92}	—	September 24, 2005	Kitt Peak	Spacewatch	·	1.4 km	MPC · JPL
227261	2005 SE_{93}	—	September 24, 2005	Kitt Peak	Spacewatch	·	1.9 km	MPC · JPL
227262	2005 SL_{98}	—	September 25, 2005	Kitt Peak	Spacewatch	·	1.6 km	MPC · JPL
227263	2005 SH_{113}	—	September 27, 2005	Kitt Peak	Spacewatch	·	910 m	MPC · JPL
227264	2005 SR_{115}	—	September 27, 2005	Kitt Peak	Spacewatch	MAS	750 m	MPC · JPL
227265	2005 SS_{119}	—	September 29, 2005	Kitt Peak	Spacewatch	·	1.3 km	MPC · JPL
227266	2005 SN_{121}	—	September 29, 2005	Kitt Peak	Spacewatch	MAS	970 m	MPC · JPL
227267	2005 SQ_{123}	—	September 29, 2005	Anderson Mesa	LONEOS	EUN	1.1 km	MPC · JPL
227268	2005 SW_{123}	—	September 29, 2005	Anderson Mesa	LONEOS	MAS	1.1 km	MPC · JPL
227269	2005 SJ_{125}	—	September 29, 2005	Mount Lemmon	Mount Lemmon Survey	MAS	750 m	MPC · JPL
227270	2005 SY_{127}	—	September 29, 2005	Mount Lemmon	Mount Lemmon Survey	NYS	1.5 km	MPC · JPL
227271	2005 SK_{128}	—	September 29, 2005	Mount Lemmon	Mount Lemmon Survey	MAS	850 m	MPC · JPL
227272	2005 SU_{133}	—	September 29, 2005	Kitt Peak	Spacewatch	·	1.5 km	MPC · JPL
227273	2005 SY_{135}	—	September 24, 2005	Kitt Peak	Spacewatch	·	890 m	MPC · JPL
227274	2005 SX_{140}	—	September 25, 2005	Kitt Peak	Spacewatch	MAS	720 m	MPC · JPL
227275	2005 SG_{145}	—	September 25, 2005	Kitt Peak	Spacewatch	·	2.1 km	MPC · JPL
227276	2005 SF_{146}	—	September 25, 2005	Palomar	NEAT	·	1.6 km	MPC · JPL
227277	2005 SL_{152}	—	September 25, 2005	Kitt Peak	Spacewatch	·	1.2 km	MPC · JPL
227278	2005 SX_{159}	—	September 27, 2005	Kitt Peak	Spacewatch	V	730 m	MPC · JPL
227279	2005 SR_{161}	—	September 27, 2005	Kitt Peak	Spacewatch	NYS	1.5 km	MPC · JPL
227280	2005 SF_{163}	—	September 27, 2005	Kitt Peak	Spacewatch	MAS	860 m	MPC · JPL
227281	2005 SK_{163}	—	September 27, 2005	Kitt Peak	Spacewatch	MAS	750 m	MPC · JPL
227282	2005 SD_{166}	—	September 28, 2005	Palomar	NEAT	·	2.1 km	MPC · JPL
227283	2005 SC_{169}	—	September 29, 2005	Kitt Peak	Spacewatch	·	1.8 km	MPC · JPL
227284	2005 SL_{171}	—	September 29, 2005	Kitt Peak	Spacewatch	·	2.4 km	MPC · JPL
227285	2005 SG_{172}	—	September 29, 2005	Kitt Peak	Spacewatch	NYS	1.4 km	MPC · JPL
227286	2005 SO_{178}	—	September 29, 2005	Anderson Mesa	LONEOS	·	1.6 km	MPC · JPL
227287	2005 SJ_{179}	—	September 29, 2005	Anderson Mesa	LONEOS	MAS	880 m	MPC · JPL
227288	2005 SS_{179}	—	September 29, 2005	Anderson Mesa	LONEOS	MAS	860 m	MPC · JPL
227289	2005 SZ_{183}	—	September 29, 2005	Kitt Peak	Spacewatch	·	1.3 km	MPC · JPL
227290	2005 SW_{189}	—	September 29, 2005	Anderson Mesa	LONEOS	·	1.5 km	MPC · JPL
227291	2005 SX_{195}	—	September 30, 2005	Kitt Peak	Spacewatch	·	2.1 km	MPC · JPL
227292	2005 SC_{206}	—	September 30, 2005	Anderson Mesa	LONEOS	·	3.2 km	MPC · JPL
227293	2005 SC_{208}	—	September 30, 2005	Kitt Peak	Spacewatch	MAR	1.6 km	MPC · JPL
227294	2005 SO_{215}	—	September 30, 2005	Catalina	CSS	·	2.2 km	MPC · JPL
227295	2005 SP_{219}	—	September 30, 2005	Mount Lemmon	Mount Lemmon Survey	·	1.6 km	MPC · JPL
227296	2005 SY_{224}	—	September 29, 2005	Kitt Peak	Spacewatch	NYS	1.8 km	MPC · JPL
227297	2005 SH_{232}	—	September 30, 2005	Mount Lemmon	Mount Lemmon Survey	·	2.0 km	MPC · JPL
227298	2005 SH_{247}	—	September 30, 2005	Kitt Peak	Spacewatch	·	1.4 km	MPC · JPL
227299	2005 SC_{251}	—	September 24, 2005	Palomar	NEAT	ERI	2.6 km	MPC · JPL
227300	2005 SP_{261}	—	September 22, 2005	Palomar	NEAT	NYS	1.5 km	MPC · JPL

== 227301–227400 ==
back to top

Designation			Discovery			Properties		Ref
Permanent	Provisional	Named after	Date	Site	Discoverer(s)	Category	Diam.	Ref
227301	2005 SU_{261}	—	September 22, 2005	Palomar	NEAT	·	1.7 km	MPC · JPL
227302	2005 SV_{265}	—	September 28, 2005	Palomar	NEAT	MAS	910 m	MPC · JPL
227303	2005 SK_{266}	—	September 29, 2005	Anderson Mesa	LONEOS	·	1.4 km	MPC · JPL
227304	2005 SL_{266}	—	September 29, 2005	Anderson Mesa	LONEOS	·	1.5 km	MPC · JPL
227305	2005 SV_{271}	—	September 27, 2005	Kitt Peak	Spacewatch	·	1.4 km	MPC · JPL
227306	2005 TE_{8}	—	October 1, 2005	Kitt Peak	Spacewatch	·	2.5 km	MPC · JPL
227307	2005 TN_{11}	—	October 1, 2005	Mount Lemmon	Mount Lemmon Survey	·	1.7 km	MPC · JPL
227308	2005 TT_{12}	—	October 1, 2005	Anderson Mesa	LONEOS	·	2.4 km	MPC · JPL
227309	2005 TN_{20}	—	October 1, 2005	Mount Lemmon	Mount Lemmon Survey	NYS	1.2 km	MPC · JPL
227310 Scottkardel	2005 TN_{29}	Scottkardel	October 2, 2005	Catalina	CSS	MAR	1.1 km	MPC · JPL
227311	2005 TC_{31}	—	October 1, 2005	Socorro	LINEAR	NYS	1.4 km	MPC · JPL
227312	2005 TV_{31}	—	October 1, 2005	Socorro	LINEAR	NYS	1.4 km	MPC · JPL
227313	2005 TE_{35}	—	October 1, 2005	Kitt Peak	Spacewatch	·	1.2 km	MPC · JPL
227314	2005 TT_{61}	—	October 3, 2005	Kitt Peak	Spacewatch	·	3.7 km	MPC · JPL
227315	2005 TM_{62}	—	October 4, 2005	Mount Lemmon	Mount Lemmon Survey	·	1.3 km	MPC · JPL
227316	2005 TZ_{62}	—	October 4, 2005	Mount Lemmon	Mount Lemmon Survey	MAS	910 m	MPC · JPL
227317	2005 TR_{68}	—	October 6, 2005	Kitt Peak	Spacewatch	·	1.2 km	MPC · JPL
227318	2005 TX_{86}	—	October 5, 2005	Kitt Peak	Spacewatch	·	1.8 km	MPC · JPL
227319	2005 TF_{88}	—	October 5, 2005	Catalina	CSS	·	1.2 km	MPC · JPL
227320	2005 TD_{97}	—	October 6, 2005	Mount Lemmon	Mount Lemmon Survey	NYS	1.4 km	MPC · JPL
227321	2005 TL_{106}	—	October 10, 2005	Kitt Peak	Spacewatch	·	1.3 km	MPC · JPL
227322	2005 TN_{121}	—	October 7, 2005	Catalina	CSS	·	1.3 km	MPC · JPL
227323	2005 TA_{123}	—	October 7, 2005	Kitt Peak	Spacewatch	·	1.9 km	MPC · JPL
227324	2005 TK_{137}	—	October 6, 2005	Kitt Peak	Spacewatch	·	1.3 km	MPC · JPL
227325	2005 TB_{151}	—	October 8, 2005	Kitt Peak	Spacewatch	·	1.4 km	MPC · JPL
227326 Narodychi	2005 TB_{152}	Narodychi	October 11, 2005	Andrushivka	Andrushivka	·	1.6 km	MPC · JPL
227327	2005 TT_{161}	—	October 9, 2005	Kitt Peak	Spacewatch	·	1.3 km	MPC · JPL
227328	2005 TJ_{170}	—	October 10, 2005	Kitt Peak	Spacewatch	·	3.2 km	MPC · JPL
227329	2005 TQ_{190}	—	October 1, 2005	Kitt Peak	Spacewatch	·	1.3 km	MPC · JPL
227330	2005 UM	—	October 23, 2005	Socorro	LINEAR	·	2.2 km	MPC · JPL
227331	2005 UW	—	October 23, 2005	Wrightwood	J. W. Young	·	2.9 km	MPC · JPL
227332	2005 UF_{2}	—	October 23, 2005	Junk Bond	D. Healy	AGN	1.4 km	MPC · JPL
227333	2005 UL_{2}	—	October 23, 2005	Goodricke-Pigott	R. A. Tucker	·	1.9 km	MPC · JPL
227334	2005 UJ_{3}	—	October 24, 2005	Goodricke-Pigott	R. A. Tucker	·	2.8 km	MPC · JPL
227335	2005 UY_{3}	—	October 25, 2005	Nashville	Clingan, R.	·	1.5 km	MPC · JPL
227336	2005 UJ_{7}	—	October 27, 2005	Mayhill	Guido, E.	·	1.5 km	MPC · JPL
227337	2005 UH_{8}	—	October 27, 2005	Ottmarsheim	C. Rinner	NYS	1.6 km	MPC · JPL
227338	2005 UX_{8}	—	October 20, 2005	Palomar	NEAT	NYS	1.5 km	MPC · JPL
227339	2005 UL_{27}	—	October 23, 2005	Catalina	CSS	·	2.3 km	MPC · JPL
227340	2005 UR_{50}	—	October 23, 2005	Catalina	CSS	·	2.7 km	MPC · JPL
227341	2005 US_{53}	—	October 23, 2005	Catalina	CSS	NYS	1.9 km	MPC · JPL
227342	2005 UX_{58}	—	October 24, 2005	Kitt Peak	Spacewatch	·	3.3 km	MPC · JPL
227343	2005 UC_{59}	—	October 24, 2005	Kitt Peak	Spacewatch	·	1.4 km	MPC · JPL
227344	2005 UN_{61}	—	October 25, 2005	Mount Lemmon	Mount Lemmon Survey	·	1.5 km	MPC · JPL
227345	2005 UX_{66}	—	October 22, 2005	Palomar	NEAT	·	1.5 km	MPC · JPL
227346	2005 UA_{67}	—	October 22, 2005	Kitt Peak	Spacewatch	·	1.5 km	MPC · JPL
227347	2005 UK_{74}	—	October 23, 2005	Palomar	NEAT	NYS	1.7 km	MPC · JPL
227348	2005 UB_{79}	—	October 25, 2005	Catalina	CSS	MAR	1.7 km	MPC · JPL
227349	2005 UQ_{80}	—	October 25, 2005	Catalina	CSS	·	1.5 km	MPC · JPL
227350	2005 UJ_{81}	—	October 27, 2005	Mount Lemmon	Mount Lemmon Survey	KON	3.0 km	MPC · JPL
227351	2005 UM_{87}	—	October 22, 2005	Kitt Peak	Spacewatch	·	1.9 km	MPC · JPL
227352	2005 UG_{88}	—	October 22, 2005	Kitt Peak	Spacewatch	·	2.3 km	MPC · JPL
227353	2005 UQ_{100}	—	October 22, 2005	Kitt Peak	Spacewatch	·	2.0 km	MPC · JPL
227354	2005 UV_{102}	—	October 22, 2005	Kitt Peak	Spacewatch	·	1.4 km	MPC · JPL
227355	2005 UU_{111}	—	October 22, 2005	Kitt Peak	Spacewatch	·	1.7 km	MPC · JPL
227356	2005 UD_{125}	—	October 24, 2005	Kitt Peak	Spacewatch	NYS	1.5 km	MPC · JPL
227357	2005 UN_{125}	—	October 24, 2005	Kitt Peak	Spacewatch	·	1.8 km	MPC · JPL
227358	2005 UZ_{127}	—	October 24, 2005	Kitt Peak	Spacewatch	·	1.5 km	MPC · JPL
227359	2005 UP_{131}	—	October 24, 2005	Palomar	NEAT	·	1.7 km	MPC · JPL
227360	2005 UK_{138}	—	October 25, 2005	Mount Lemmon	Mount Lemmon Survey	·	1.2 km	MPC · JPL
227361	2005 UV_{148}	—	October 26, 2005	Kitt Peak	Spacewatch	·	2.1 km	MPC · JPL
227362	2005 UD_{153}	—	October 26, 2005	Kitt Peak	Spacewatch	·	1.8 km	MPC · JPL
227363	2005 UB_{160}	—	October 22, 2005	Catalina	CSS	·	2.0 km	MPC · JPL
227364	2005 UU_{163}	—	October 24, 2005	Kitt Peak	Spacewatch	·	1.3 km	MPC · JPL
227365	2005 UK_{164}	—	October 24, 2005	Kitt Peak	Spacewatch	·	1.8 km	MPC · JPL
227366	2005 UZ_{166}	—	October 24, 2005	Kitt Peak	Spacewatch	ERI	3.0 km	MPC · JPL
227367	2005 UB_{167}	—	October 24, 2005	Kitt Peak	Spacewatch	·	1.5 km	MPC · JPL
227368	2005 UP_{172}	—	October 24, 2005	Kitt Peak	Spacewatch	·	1.8 km	MPC · JPL
227369	2005 US_{180}	—	October 24, 2005	Kitt Peak	Spacewatch	·	1.4 km	MPC · JPL
227370	2005 UV_{190}	—	October 27, 2005	Mount Lemmon	Mount Lemmon Survey	·	1.9 km	MPC · JPL
227371	2005 UT_{191}	—	October 27, 2005	Mount Lemmon	Mount Lemmon Survey	·	1.4 km	MPC · JPL
227372	2005 UL_{203}	—	October 25, 2005	Mount Lemmon	Mount Lemmon Survey	MAS	760 m	MPC · JPL
227373	2005 UH_{213}	—	October 20, 2005	Palomar	NEAT	·	1.6 km	MPC · JPL
227374	2005 UH_{216}	—	October 25, 2005	Catalina	CSS	MAS	1.0 km	MPC · JPL
227375	2005 UA_{227}	—	October 25, 2005	Kitt Peak	Spacewatch	·	1.5 km	MPC · JPL
227376	2005 UM_{233}	—	October 25, 2005	Kitt Peak	Spacewatch	ADE	2.7 km	MPC · JPL
227377	2005 UV_{238}	—	October 25, 2005	Kitt Peak	Spacewatch	MAR	1.4 km	MPC · JPL
227378	2005 UE_{241}	—	October 25, 2005	Kitt Peak	Spacewatch	·	1.9 km	MPC · JPL
227379	2005 UQ_{244}	—	October 25, 2005	Kitt Peak	Spacewatch	·	1.8 km	MPC · JPL
227380	2005 UJ_{255}	—	October 24, 2005	Kitt Peak	Spacewatch	·	1.4 km	MPC · JPL
227381	2005 US_{256}	—	October 25, 2005	Mount Lemmon	Mount Lemmon Survey	·	1.1 km	MPC · JPL
227382	2005 UV_{265}	—	October 27, 2005	Kitt Peak	Spacewatch	·	1.9 km	MPC · JPL
227383	2005 UB_{266}	—	October 27, 2005	Kitt Peak	Spacewatch	·	2.8 km	MPC · JPL
227384	2005 UT_{275}	—	October 23, 2005	Palomar	NEAT	·	2.2 km	MPC · JPL
227385	2005 UA_{284}	—	October 26, 2005	Kitt Peak	Spacewatch	·	980 m	MPC · JPL
227386	2005 UJ_{297}	—	October 26, 2005	Kitt Peak	Spacewatch	(5)	1.4 km	MPC · JPL
227387	2005 UQ_{298}	—	October 26, 2005	Kitt Peak	Spacewatch	·	1.1 km	MPC · JPL
227388	2005 UE_{301}	—	October 26, 2005	Kitt Peak	Spacewatch	·	3.0 km	MPC · JPL
227389	2005 UH_{310}	—	October 29, 2005	Mount Lemmon	Mount Lemmon Survey	·	1.1 km	MPC · JPL
227390	2005 UQ_{311}	—	October 29, 2005	Mount Lemmon	Mount Lemmon Survey	·	1.4 km	MPC · JPL
227391	2005 UW_{319}	—	October 27, 2005	Kitt Peak	Spacewatch	·	1.6 km	MPC · JPL
227392	2005 UP_{342}	—	October 31, 2005	Catalina	CSS	·	1.8 km	MPC · JPL
227393	2005 UL_{345}	—	October 29, 2005	Mount Lemmon	Mount Lemmon Survey	·	1.6 km	MPC · JPL
227394	2005 UR_{351}	—	October 29, 2005	Catalina	CSS	·	2.4 km	MPC · JPL
227395	2005 UD_{364}	—	October 27, 2005	Kitt Peak	Spacewatch	NYS	1.7 km	MPC · JPL
227396	2005 UC_{374}	—	October 27, 2005	Kitt Peak	Spacewatch	·	1.3 km	MPC · JPL
227397	2005 UO_{377}	—	October 28, 2005	Mount Lemmon	Mount Lemmon Survey	·	1.4 km	MPC · JPL
227398	2005 UW_{388}	—	October 27, 2005	Mount Lemmon	Mount Lemmon Survey	·	1.3 km	MPC · JPL
227399	2005 UW_{394}	—	October 30, 2005	Mount Lemmon	Mount Lemmon Survey	·	950 m	MPC · JPL
227400	2005 UK_{398}	—	October 30, 2005	Mount Lemmon	Mount Lemmon Survey	·	1.9 km	MPC · JPL

== 227401–227500 ==
back to top

Designation			Discovery			Properties		Ref
Permanent	Provisional	Named after	Date	Site	Discoverer(s)	Category	Diam.	Ref
227401	2005 UM_{403}	—	October 29, 2005	Mount Lemmon	Mount Lemmon Survey	NYS	1.6 km	MPC · JPL
227402	2005 UF_{411}	—	October 31, 2005	Mount Lemmon	Mount Lemmon Survey	·	1.9 km	MPC · JPL
227403	2005 UA_{432}	—	October 28, 2005	Kitt Peak	Spacewatch	·	1.2 km	MPC · JPL
227404	2005 UE_{433}	—	October 28, 2005	Kitt Peak	Spacewatch	MAS	790 m	MPC · JPL
227405	2005 UT_{441}	—	October 29, 2005	Mount Lemmon	Mount Lemmon Survey	·	1.8 km	MPC · JPL
227406	2005 UJ_{445}	—	October 31, 2005	Kitt Peak	Spacewatch	RAF	1.2 km	MPC · JPL
227407	2005 UN_{446}	—	October 29, 2005	Catalina	CSS	·	1.5 km	MPC · JPL
227408	2005 UZ_{448}	—	October 30, 2005	Kitt Peak	Spacewatch	·	1.4 km	MPC · JPL
227409	2005 UA_{451}	—	October 27, 2005	Mount Lemmon	Mount Lemmon Survey	·	1.4 km	MPC · JPL
227410	2005 UN_{457}	—	October 31, 2005	Palomar	NEAT	PHO	2.2 km	MPC · JPL
227411	2005 UR_{459}	—	October 27, 2005	Mount Lemmon	Mount Lemmon Survey	·	1.9 km	MPC · JPL
227412	2005 UG_{476}	—	October 23, 2005	Catalina	CSS	·	1.8 km	MPC · JPL
227413	2005 UK_{497}	—	October 27, 2005	Socorro	LINEAR	·	2.5 km	MPC · JPL
227414	2005 US_{501}	—	October 27, 2005	Catalina	CSS	(116763)	2.7 km	MPC · JPL
227415	2005 US_{508}	—	October 24, 2005	Kitt Peak	Spacewatch	·	1.4 km	MPC · JPL
227416	2005 UD_{509}	—	October 25, 2005	Mount Lemmon	Mount Lemmon Survey	·	2.5 km	MPC · JPL
227417	2005 UK_{513}	—	October 24, 2005	Kitt Peak	Spacewatch	NYS	1.4 km	MPC · JPL
227418	2005 UJ_{517}	—	October 25, 2005	Apache Point	A. C. Becker	·	3.1 km	MPC · JPL
227419	2005 VQ_{4}	—	November 7, 2005	Marly	Observatoire Naef	·	2.0 km	MPC · JPL
227420	2005 VP_{26}	—	November 3, 2005	Kitt Peak	Spacewatch	AEO	1.5 km	MPC · JPL
227421	2005 VJ_{32}	—	November 4, 2005	Kitt Peak	Spacewatch	EUN	1.5 km	MPC · JPL
227422	2005 VN_{34}	—	November 3, 2005	Catalina	CSS	V	910 m	MPC · JPL
227423	2005 VC_{42}	—	November 3, 2005	Catalina	CSS	·	2.1 km	MPC · JPL
227424	2005 VR_{58}	—	November 5, 2005	Kitt Peak	Spacewatch	PAD	2.1 km	MPC · JPL
227425	2005 VR_{66}	—	November 1, 2005	Mount Lemmon	Mount Lemmon Survey	·	2.0 km	MPC · JPL
227426	2005 VB_{70}	—	November 1, 2005	Mount Lemmon	Mount Lemmon Survey	·	2.3 km	MPC · JPL
227427 Williamwren	2005 VX_{78}	Williamwren	November 6, 2005	Mount Lemmon	Mount Lemmon Survey	·	5.2 km	MPC · JPL
227428	2005 VC_{81}	—	November 5, 2005	Kitt Peak	Spacewatch	·	1.3 km	MPC · JPL
227429	2005 VQ_{81}	—	November 5, 2005	Kitt Peak	Spacewatch	EUN	2.0 km	MPC · JPL
227430	2005 VX_{98}	—	November 10, 2005	Catalina	CSS	·	3.0 km	MPC · JPL
227431	2005 VF_{109}	—	November 6, 2005	Mount Lemmon	Mount Lemmon Survey	·	1.0 km	MPC · JPL
227432	2005 VN_{115}	—	November 11, 2005	Kitt Peak	Spacewatch	V	1.1 km	MPC · JPL
227433	2005 VF_{122}	—	November 1, 2005	Palomar	NEAT	·	2.4 km	MPC · JPL
227434	2005 VV_{123}	—	November 6, 2005	Mount Lemmon	Mount Lemmon Survey	·	2.3 km	MPC · JPL
227435	2005 WQ_{15}	—	November 22, 2005	Kitt Peak	Spacewatch	·	2.4 km	MPC · JPL
227436	2005 WF_{20}	—	November 21, 2005	Kitt Peak	Spacewatch	·	1.2 km	MPC · JPL
227437	2005 WB_{22}	—	November 21, 2005	Kitt Peak	Spacewatch	·	2.2 km	MPC · JPL
227438	2005 WN_{26}	—	November 21, 2005	Kitt Peak	Spacewatch	·	1.9 km	MPC · JPL
227439	2005 WM_{29}	—	November 21, 2005	Kitt Peak	Spacewatch	·	1.1 km	MPC · JPL
227440	2005 WN_{30}	—	November 21, 2005	Kitt Peak	Spacewatch	·	1.3 km	MPC · JPL
227441	2005 WC_{31}	—	November 21, 2005	Kitt Peak	Spacewatch	·	1.4 km	MPC · JPL
227442	2005 WN_{33}	—	November 21, 2005	Kitt Peak	Spacewatch	·	4.6 km	MPC · JPL
227443	2005 WW_{37}	—	November 22, 2005	Kitt Peak	Spacewatch	·	3.2 km	MPC · JPL
227444	2005 WS_{38}	—	November 22, 2005	Kitt Peak	Spacewatch	EUN	1.2 km	MPC · JPL
227445	2005 WR_{45}	—	November 22, 2005	Kitt Peak	Spacewatch	·	1.9 km	MPC · JPL
227446	2005 WF_{47}	—	November 25, 2005	Kitt Peak	Spacewatch	·	1.7 km	MPC · JPL
227447	2005 WF_{48}	—	November 25, 2005	Mount Lemmon	Mount Lemmon Survey	·	1.6 km	MPC · JPL
227448	2005 WL_{53}	—	November 25, 2005	Mount Lemmon	Mount Lemmon Survey	(5)	1.9 km	MPC · JPL
227449	2005 WC_{54}	—	November 25, 2005	Mount Lemmon	Mount Lemmon Survey	·	2.1 km	MPC · JPL
227450	2005 WA_{62}	—	November 25, 2005	Kitt Peak	Spacewatch	·	1.8 km	MPC · JPL
227451	2005 WA_{68}	—	November 22, 2005	Kitt Peak	Spacewatch	·	1.9 km	MPC · JPL
227452	2005 WN_{73}	—	November 25, 2005	Mount Lemmon	Mount Lemmon Survey	·	2.0 km	MPC · JPL
227453	2005 WR_{74}	—	November 28, 2005	Palomar	NEAT	·	2.6 km	MPC · JPL
227454	2005 WJ_{99}	—	November 28, 2005	Mount Lemmon	Mount Lemmon Survey	AGN	1.7 km	MPC · JPL
227455	2005 WO_{99}	—	November 28, 2005	Mount Lemmon	Mount Lemmon Survey	·	2.4 km	MPC · JPL
227456	2005 WS_{99}	—	November 28, 2005	Mount Lemmon	Mount Lemmon Survey	·	2.1 km	MPC · JPL
227457	2005 WQ_{101}	—	November 29, 2005	Kitt Peak	Spacewatch	AST	1.7 km	MPC · JPL
227458	2005 WB_{103}	—	November 26, 2005	Kitt Peak	Spacewatch	RAF	1.5 km	MPC · JPL
227459	2005 WV_{103}	—	November 28, 2005	Palomar	NEAT	EUN	1.3 km	MPC · JPL
227460	2005 WF_{104}	—	November 28, 2005	Catalina	CSS	(5)	3.1 km	MPC · JPL
227461	2005 WF_{113}	—	November 25, 2005	Catalina	CSS	·	2.2 km	MPC · JPL
227462	2005 WX_{115}	—	November 30, 2005	Socorro	LINEAR	·	2.4 km	MPC · JPL
227463	2005 WF_{117}	—	November 30, 2005	Socorro	LINEAR	EUN	2.1 km	MPC · JPL
227464	2005 WK_{120}	—	November 29, 2005	Mount Lemmon	Mount Lemmon Survey	·	1.8 km	MPC · JPL
227465	2005 WR_{120}	—	November 29, 2005	Mount Lemmon	Mount Lemmon Survey	·	2.5 km	MPC · JPL
227466	2005 WO_{121}	—	November 30, 2005	Mount Lemmon	Mount Lemmon Survey	·	2.5 km	MPC · JPL
227467	2005 WH_{134}	—	November 25, 2005	Mount Lemmon	Mount Lemmon Survey	·	2.4 km	MPC · JPL
227468	2005 WJ_{135}	—	November 25, 2005	Mount Lemmon	Mount Lemmon Survey	·	3.6 km	MPC · JPL
227469	2005 WQ_{142}	—	November 29, 2005	Mount Lemmon	Mount Lemmon Survey	·	1.4 km	MPC · JPL
227470	2005 WU_{147}	—	November 25, 2005	Kitt Peak	Spacewatch	·	1.4 km	MPC · JPL
227471	2005 WO_{160}	—	November 28, 2005	Kitt Peak	Spacewatch	·	2.6 km	MPC · JPL
227472	2005 WF_{162}	—	November 28, 2005	Mount Lemmon	Mount Lemmon Survey	·	2.2 km	MPC · JPL
227473	2005 WO_{166}	—	November 29, 2005	Mount Lemmon	Mount Lemmon Survey	·	2.3 km	MPC · JPL
227474	2005 WZ_{167}	—	November 30, 2005	Kitt Peak	Spacewatch	·	1.9 km	MPC · JPL
227475	2005 WY_{174}	—	November 30, 2005	Kitt Peak	Spacewatch	·	2.1 km	MPC · JPL
227476	2005 WA_{177}	—	November 30, 2005	Kitt Peak	Spacewatch	·	1.9 km	MPC · JPL
227477	2005 WV_{185}	—	November 30, 2005	Socorro	LINEAR	·	2.7 km	MPC · JPL
227478	2005 WY_{188}	—	November 30, 2005	Socorro	LINEAR	·	1.6 km	MPC · JPL
227479	2005 WE_{190}	—	November 20, 2005	Anderson Mesa	LONEOS	·	2.1 km	MPC · JPL
227480	2005 WP_{192}	—	November 25, 2005	Catalina	CSS	·	4.4 km	MPC · JPL
227481	2005 WT_{194}	—	November 29, 2005	Catalina	CSS	·	2.4 km	MPC · JPL
227482	2005 WG_{202}	—	November 30, 2005	Kitt Peak	Spacewatch	·	2.8 km	MPC · JPL
227483	2005 XO	—	December 1, 2005	Junk Bond	D. Healy	·	1.5 km	MPC · JPL
227484	2005 XB_{3}	—	December 1, 2005	Socorro	LINEAR	·	1.6 km	MPC · JPL
227485	2005 XF_{13}	—	December 1, 2005	Kitt Peak	Spacewatch	(5)	2.1 km	MPC · JPL
227486	2005 XQ_{17}	—	December 1, 2005	Kitt Peak	Spacewatch	·	2.8 km	MPC · JPL
227487	2005 XD_{19}	—	December 2, 2005	Kitt Peak	Spacewatch	NYS	1.7 km	MPC · JPL
227488	2005 XN_{25}	—	December 4, 2005	Socorro	LINEAR	·	2.3 km	MPC · JPL
227489	2005 XS_{28}	—	December 1, 2005	Palomar	NEAT	JUN	1.8 km	MPC · JPL
227490	2005 XO_{34}	—	December 4, 2005	Kitt Peak	Spacewatch	·	2.3 km	MPC · JPL
227491	2005 XW_{48}	—	December 2, 2005	Socorro	LINEAR	·	1.6 km	MPC · JPL
227492	2005 XR_{50}	—	December 2, 2005	Kitt Peak	Spacewatch	·	2.1 km	MPC · JPL
227493	2005 XF_{56}	—	December 5, 2005	Catalina	CSS	·	3.9 km	MPC · JPL
227494	2005 XL_{67}	—	December 5, 2005	Socorro	LINEAR	·	1.2 km	MPC · JPL
227495	2005 XT_{71}	—	December 6, 2005	Kitt Peak	Spacewatch	·	2.0 km	MPC · JPL
227496	2005 XW_{72}	—	December 6, 2005	Kitt Peak	Spacewatch	·	3.2 km	MPC · JPL
227497	2005 XF_{75}	—	December 6, 2005	Kitt Peak	Spacewatch	·	2.4 km	MPC · JPL
227498	2005 XJ_{76}	—	December 7, 2005	Kitt Peak	Spacewatch	·	2.8 km	MPC · JPL
227499	2005 XV_{76}	—	December 8, 2005	Kitt Peak	Spacewatch	·	2.3 km	MPC · JPL
227500	2005 XE_{78}	—	December 2, 2005	Catalina	CSS	(194)	2.1 km	MPC · JPL

== 227501–227600 ==
back to top

Designation			Discovery			Properties		Ref
Permanent	Provisional	Named after	Date	Site	Discoverer(s)	Category	Diam.	Ref
227501	2005 XK_{79}	—	December 1, 2005	Kitt Peak	Spacewatch	·	2.7 km	MPC · JPL
227502	2005 XQ_{83}	—	December 4, 2005	Socorro	LINEAR	·	2.5 km	MPC · JPL
227503	2005 XR_{84}	—	December 10, 2005	Catalina	CSS	·	2.2 km	MPC · JPL
227504	2005 XK_{104}	—	December 1, 2005	Kitt Peak	M. W. Buie	·	3.3 km	MPC · JPL
227505	2005 XW_{105}	—	December 1, 2005	Kitt Peak	M. W. Buie	HOF ·	3.7 km	MPC · JPL
227506	2005 XQ_{106}	—	December 1, 2005	Kitt Peak	M. W. Buie	·	2.9 km	MPC · JPL
227507	2005 XU_{114}	—	December 7, 2005	Kitt Peak	Spacewatch	·	6.8 km	MPC · JPL
227508	2005 YS_{2}	—	December 21, 2005	Anderson Mesa	LONEOS	·	2.0 km	MPC · JPL
227509	2005 YM_{7}	—	December 22, 2005	Kitt Peak	Spacewatch	KOR	1.8 km	MPC · JPL
227510	2005 YV_{10}	—	December 21, 2005	Kitt Peak	Spacewatch	·	1.9 km	MPC · JPL
227511	2005 YN_{13}	—	December 22, 2005	Kitt Peak	Spacewatch	·	3.1 km	MPC · JPL
227512	2005 YE_{21}	—	December 24, 2005	Kitt Peak	Spacewatch	KOR	1.6 km	MPC · JPL
227513	2005 YR_{30}	—	December 22, 2005	Catalina	CSS	JUN	1.9 km	MPC · JPL
227514	2005 YS_{32}	—	December 22, 2005	Kitt Peak	Spacewatch	KOR	2.0 km	MPC · JPL
227515	2005 YC_{34}	—	December 24, 2005	Kitt Peak	Spacewatch	·	3.3 km	MPC · JPL
227516	2005 YQ_{34}	—	December 24, 2005	Kitt Peak	Spacewatch	·	2.0 km	MPC · JPL
227517	2005 YN_{36}	—	December 25, 2005	Kitt Peak	Spacewatch	MRX	1.1 km	MPC · JPL
227518	2005 YS_{39}	—	December 22, 2005	Kitt Peak	Spacewatch	·	4.4 km	MPC · JPL
227519	2005 YV_{39}	—	December 22, 2005	Kitt Peak	Spacewatch	·	2.6 km	MPC · JPL
227520	2005 YY_{40}	—	December 21, 2005	Kitt Peak	Spacewatch	KOR	1.3 km	MPC · JPL
227521	2005 YE_{42}	—	December 22, 2005	Kitt Peak	Spacewatch	·	3.2 km	MPC · JPL
227522	2005 YD_{46}	—	December 25, 2005	Kitt Peak	Spacewatch	·	3.3 km	MPC · JPL
227523	2005 YZ_{54}	—	December 25, 2005	Mount Lemmon	Mount Lemmon Survey	·	2.7 km	MPC · JPL
227524	2005 YF_{56}	—	December 21, 2005	Catalina	CSS	·	3.2 km	MPC · JPL
227525	2005 YU_{57}	—	December 24, 2005	Kitt Peak	Spacewatch	KOR	1.9 km	MPC · JPL
227526	2005 YM_{59}	—	December 26, 2005	Kitt Peak	Spacewatch	·	2.3 km	MPC · JPL
227527	2005 YX_{59}	—	December 22, 2005	Kitt Peak	Spacewatch	·	1.9 km	MPC · JPL
227528	2005 YR_{60}	—	December 22, 2005	Kitt Peak	Spacewatch	·	2.2 km	MPC · JPL
227529	2005 YV_{61}	—	December 24, 2005	Kitt Peak	Spacewatch	·	2.3 km	MPC · JPL
227530	2005 YZ_{69}	—	December 26, 2005	Kitt Peak	Spacewatch	·	3.3 km	MPC · JPL
227531	2005 YS_{73}	—	December 24, 2005	Kitt Peak	Spacewatch	·	2.2 km	MPC · JPL
227532	2005 YD_{76}	—	December 24, 2005	Kitt Peak	Spacewatch	·	2.1 km	MPC · JPL
227533	2005 YH_{84}	—	December 24, 2005	Kitt Peak	Spacewatch	·	2.6 km	MPC · JPL
227534	2005 YK_{84}	—	December 24, 2005	Kitt Peak	Spacewatch	·	4.8 km	MPC · JPL
227535	2005 YF_{90}	—	December 26, 2005	Mount Lemmon	Mount Lemmon Survey	·	1.3 km	MPC · JPL
227536	2005 YB_{91}	—	December 26, 2005	Mount Lemmon	Mount Lemmon Survey	·	4.9 km	MPC · JPL
227537	2005 YP_{91}	—	December 26, 2005	Mount Lemmon	Mount Lemmon Survey	·	1.9 km	MPC · JPL
227538	2005 YJ_{94}	—	December 27, 2005	Catalina	CSS	·	3.5 km	MPC · JPL
227539	2005 YN_{96}	—	December 25, 2005	Kitt Peak	Spacewatch	KOR	1.8 km	MPC · JPL
227540	2005 YL_{102}	—	December 25, 2005	Kitt Peak	Spacewatch	·	1.9 km	MPC · JPL
227541	2005 YR_{113}	—	December 25, 2005	Kitt Peak	Spacewatch	MRX	1.4 km	MPC · JPL
227542	2005 YN_{115}	—	December 25, 2005	Kitt Peak	Spacewatch	·	3.1 km	MPC · JPL
227543	2005 YP_{120}	—	December 27, 2005	Mount Lemmon	Mount Lemmon Survey	AGN	1.6 km	MPC · JPL
227544	2005 YZ_{124}	—	December 26, 2005	Kitt Peak	Spacewatch	·	1.8 km	MPC · JPL
227545	2005 YZ_{128}	—	December 25, 2005	Gnosca	S. Sposetti	·	2.9 km	MPC · JPL
227546	2005 YQ_{135}	—	December 26, 2005	Kitt Peak	Spacewatch	·	1.9 km	MPC · JPL
227547	2005 YS_{136}	—	December 26, 2005	Kitt Peak	Spacewatch	·	2.3 km	MPC · JPL
227548	2005 YL_{138}	—	December 26, 2005	Kitt Peak	Spacewatch	KOR	1.6 km	MPC · JPL
227549	2005 YT_{144}	—	December 28, 2005	Mount Lemmon	Mount Lemmon Survey	KOR	1.8 km	MPC · JPL
227550	2005 YD_{150}	—	December 25, 2005	Kitt Peak	Spacewatch	AGN	2.1 km	MPC · JPL
227551	2005 YL_{157}	—	December 27, 2005	Kitt Peak	Spacewatch	·	1.5 km	MPC · JPL
227552	2005 YK_{167}	—	December 27, 2005	Kitt Peak	Spacewatch	AGN	1.2 km	MPC · JPL
227553	2005 YX_{167}	—	December 28, 2005	Palomar	NEAT	·	2.5 km	MPC · JPL
227554	2005 YK_{170}	—	December 31, 2005	Kitt Peak	Spacewatch	·	3.0 km	MPC · JPL
227555	2005 YH_{174}	—	December 29, 2005	Catalina	CSS	·	2.9 km	MPC · JPL
227556	2005 YB_{176}	—	December 22, 2005	Kitt Peak	Spacewatch	KOR	1.6 km	MPC · JPL
227557	2005 YN_{178}	—	December 25, 2005	Kitt Peak	Spacewatch	·	2.6 km	MPC · JPL
227558	2005 YQ_{182}	—	December 30, 2005	Socorro	LINEAR	·	4.1 km	MPC · JPL
227559	2005 YW_{184}	—	December 27, 2005	Mount Lemmon	Mount Lemmon Survey	·	1.8 km	MPC · JPL
227560	2005 YE_{185}	—	December 27, 2005	Kitt Peak	Spacewatch	·	2.9 km	MPC · JPL
227561	2005 YX_{189}	—	December 30, 2005	Socorro	LINEAR	·	2.9 km	MPC · JPL
227562	2005 YM_{190}	—	December 30, 2005	Kitt Peak	Spacewatch	(12739)	2.3 km	MPC · JPL
227563	2005 YP_{190}	—	December 30, 2005	Kitt Peak	Spacewatch	AST	3.1 km	MPC · JPL
227564	2005 YV_{192}	—	December 30, 2005	Kitt Peak	Spacewatch	AST	2.9 km	MPC · JPL
227565	2005 YN_{193}	—	December 30, 2005	Kitt Peak	Spacewatch	KOR	2.0 km	MPC · JPL
227566	2005 YQ_{199}	—	December 25, 2005	Mount Lemmon	Mount Lemmon Survey	·	2.3 km	MPC · JPL
227567	2005 YY_{200}	—	December 22, 2005	Kitt Peak	Spacewatch	·	2.1 km	MPC · JPL
227568	2005 YL_{205}	—	December 26, 2005	Mount Lemmon	Mount Lemmon Survey	·	1.8 km	MPC · JPL
227569	2005 YT_{206}	—	December 27, 2005	Kitt Peak	Spacewatch	·	1.4 km	MPC · JPL
227570	2005 YH_{210}	—	December 24, 2005	Socorro	LINEAR	·	2.0 km	MPC · JPL
227571	2005 YW_{214}	—	December 30, 2005	Catalina	CSS	·	2.0 km	MPC · JPL
227572	2005 YT_{217}	—	December 31, 2005	Kitt Peak	Spacewatch	·	2.0 km	MPC · JPL
227573	2005 YO_{221}	—	December 21, 2005	Kitt Peak	Spacewatch	·	1.9 km	MPC · JPL
227574	2005 YR_{223}	—	December 24, 2005	Kitt Peak	Spacewatch	·	3.0 km	MPC · JPL
227575	2005 YP_{229}	—	December 26, 2005	Kitt Peak	Spacewatch	·	3.2 km	MPC · JPL
227576	2005 YZ_{231}	—	December 28, 2005	Kitt Peak	Spacewatch	AGN	1.6 km	MPC · JPL
227577	2005 YO_{240}	—	December 29, 2005	Kitt Peak	Spacewatch	AGN	1.3 km	MPC · JPL
227578	2005 YJ_{252}	—	December 29, 2005	Kitt Peak	Spacewatch	·	3.2 km	MPC · JPL
227579	2005 YB_{260}	—	December 24, 2005	Kitt Peak	Spacewatch	·	4.1 km	MPC · JPL
227580	2005 YT_{273}	—	December 30, 2005	Kitt Peak	Spacewatch	·	2.6 km	MPC · JPL
227581	2005 YH_{275}	—	December 28, 2005	Mount Lemmon	Mount Lemmon Survey	·	2.0 km	MPC · JPL
227582	2005 YY_{277}	—	December 25, 2005	Mount Lemmon	Mount Lemmon Survey	·	2.1 km	MPC · JPL
227583	2006 AU_{2}	—	January 5, 2006	Vicques	M. Ory	·	2.4 km	MPC · JPL
227584	2006 AE_{4}	—	January 7, 2006	Mayhill	Lowe, A.	·	3.1 km	MPC · JPL
227585	2006 AT_{5}	—	January 2, 2006	Catalina	CSS	JUN	1.4 km	MPC · JPL
227586	2006 AC_{9}	—	January 2, 2006	Catalina	CSS	EUN	2.0 km	MPC · JPL
227587	2006 AC_{18}	—	January 5, 2006	Mount Lemmon	Mount Lemmon Survey	·	4.6 km	MPC · JPL
227588	2006 AH_{18}	—	January 5, 2006	Mount Lemmon	Mount Lemmon Survey	·	4.3 km	MPC · JPL
227589	2006 AA_{20}	—	January 5, 2006	Catalina	CSS	·	1.9 km	MPC · JPL
227590	2006 AB_{23}	—	January 4, 2006	Kitt Peak	Spacewatch	KOR	1.9 km	MPC · JPL
227591	2006 AR_{23}	—	January 4, 2006	Kitt Peak	Spacewatch	KOR	2.1 km	MPC · JPL
227592	2006 AO_{27}	—	January 5, 2006	Kitt Peak	Spacewatch	·	2.4 km	MPC · JPL
227593	2006 AG_{29}	—	January 6, 2006	Kitt Peak	Spacewatch	GEF	1.8 km	MPC · JPL
227594	2006 AB_{32}	—	January 5, 2006	Catalina	CSS	·	2.8 km	MPC · JPL
227595	2006 AX_{37}	—	January 4, 2006	Kitt Peak	Spacewatch	·	3.9 km	MPC · JPL
227596	2006 AV_{41}	—	January 5, 2006	Kitt Peak	Spacewatch	AGN	1.4 km	MPC · JPL
227597	2006 AF_{42}	—	January 6, 2006	Kitt Peak	Spacewatch	·	2.5 km	MPC · JPL
227598	2006 AU_{42}	—	January 6, 2006	Kitt Peak	Spacewatch	AGN	1.6 km	MPC · JPL
227599	2006 AZ_{48}	—	January 4, 2006	Mount Lemmon	Mount Lemmon Survey	KOR	1.5 km	MPC · JPL
227600	2006 AU_{52}	—	January 5, 2006	Kitt Peak	Spacewatch	·	2.1 km	MPC · JPL

== 227601–227700 ==
back to top

Designation			Discovery			Properties		Ref
Permanent	Provisional	Named after	Date	Site	Discoverer(s)	Category	Diam.	Ref
227601	2006 AB_{55}	—	January 5, 2006	Kitt Peak	Spacewatch	HOF	2.9 km	MPC · JPL
227602	2006 AD_{68}	—	January 5, 2006	Mount Lemmon	Mount Lemmon Survey	KOR	1.8 km	MPC · JPL
227603	2006 AH_{68}	—	January 5, 2006	Mount Lemmon	Mount Lemmon Survey	·	2.1 km	MPC · JPL
227604	2006 AV_{68}	—	January 5, 2006	Mount Lemmon	Mount Lemmon Survey	·	3.3 km	MPC · JPL
227605	2006 AM_{70}	—	January 6, 2006	Kitt Peak	Spacewatch	HOF	3.9 km	MPC · JPL
227606	2006 AQ_{70}	—	January 6, 2006	Kitt Peak	Spacewatch	·	2.1 km	MPC · JPL
227607	2006 AD_{71}	—	January 6, 2006	Mount Lemmon	Mount Lemmon Survey	·	2.4 km	MPC · JPL
227608	2006 AH_{71}	—	January 6, 2006	Kitt Peak	Spacewatch	·	2.2 km	MPC · JPL
227609	2006 AK_{78}	—	January 9, 2006	Kitt Peak	Spacewatch	·	2.2 km	MPC · JPL
227610	2006 AT_{84}	—	January 6, 2006	Anderson Mesa	LONEOS	·	2.3 km	MPC · JPL
227611	2006 AJ_{95}	—	January 9, 2006	Kitt Peak	Spacewatch	KOR	1.6 km	MPC · JPL
227612	2006 AO_{96}	—	January 7, 2006	Anderson Mesa	LONEOS	·	4.1 km	MPC · JPL
227613	2006 AF_{100}	—	January 4, 2006	Mount Lemmon	Mount Lemmon Survey	·	2.1 km	MPC · JPL
227614	2006 BJ_{1}	—	January 20, 2006	Kitt Peak	Spacewatch	·	3.3 km	MPC · JPL
227615	2006 BD_{5}	—	January 21, 2006	Kitt Peak	Spacewatch	MIS	1.6 km	MPC · JPL
227616	2006 BF_{10}	—	January 20, 2006	Kitt Peak	Spacewatch	·	2.5 km	MPC · JPL
227617	2006 BP_{10}	—	January 20, 2006	Kitt Peak	Spacewatch	·	3.5 km	MPC · JPL
227618	2006 BZ_{13}	—	January 22, 2006	Mount Lemmon	Mount Lemmon Survey	·	2.3 km	MPC · JPL
227619	2006 BH_{26}	—	January 22, 2006	Anderson Mesa	LONEOS	·	2.5 km	MPC · JPL
227620	2006 BO_{33}	—	January 21, 2006	Kitt Peak	Spacewatch	KOR	2.1 km	MPC · JPL
227621	2006 BU_{43}	—	January 23, 2006	Socorro	LINEAR	·	2.8 km	MPC · JPL
227622	2006 BF_{46}	—	January 23, 2006	Mount Lemmon	Mount Lemmon Survey	·	2.1 km	MPC · JPL
227623	2006 BW_{49}	—	January 25, 2006	Kitt Peak	Spacewatch	KOR	1.4 km	MPC · JPL
227624	2006 BX_{59}	—	January 25, 2006	Kitt Peak	Spacewatch	·	3.3 km	MPC · JPL
227625	2006 BG_{60}	—	January 26, 2006	Kitt Peak	Spacewatch	KOR	1.5 km	MPC · JPL
227626	2006 BG_{62}	—	January 22, 2006	Catalina	CSS	·	3.3 km	MPC · JPL
227627	2006 BS_{65}	—	January 23, 2006	Kitt Peak	Spacewatch	·	2.7 km	MPC · JPL
227628	2006 BN_{73}	—	January 23, 2006	Kitt Peak	Spacewatch	·	2.6 km	MPC · JPL
227629	2006 BT_{77}	—	January 23, 2006	Mount Lemmon	Mount Lemmon Survey	KOR	1.9 km	MPC · JPL
227630	2006 BR_{84}	—	January 25, 2006	Kitt Peak	Spacewatch	·	2.7 km	MPC · JPL
227631	2006 BT_{86}	—	January 25, 2006	Kitt Peak	Spacewatch	KOR	1.8 km	MPC · JPL
227632	2006 BX_{87}	—	January 25, 2006	Kitt Peak	Spacewatch	·	5.1 km	MPC · JPL
227633	2006 BY_{91}	—	January 26, 2006	Kitt Peak	Spacewatch	MRX	1.5 km	MPC · JPL
227634	2006 BV_{93}	—	January 26, 2006	Kitt Peak	Spacewatch	·	3.6 km	MPC · JPL
227635	2006 BU_{94}	—	January 26, 2006	Kitt Peak	Spacewatch	·	3.8 km	MPC · JPL
227636	2006 BX_{94}	—	January 26, 2006	Mount Lemmon	Mount Lemmon Survey	THM	3.5 km	MPC · JPL
227637	2006 BG_{95}	—	January 26, 2006	Kitt Peak	Spacewatch	·	3.9 km	MPC · JPL
227638	2006 BM_{95}	—	January 26, 2006	Kitt Peak	Spacewatch	·	2.9 km	MPC · JPL
227639	2006 BS_{95}	—	January 26, 2006	Kitt Peak	Spacewatch	·	3.5 km	MPC · JPL
227640	2006 BT_{98}	—	January 20, 2006	Catalina	CSS	·	3.1 km	MPC · JPL
227641 Nothomb	2006 BD_{99}	Nothomb	January 28, 2006	Nogales	J.-C. Merlin	KOR	1.6 km	MPC · JPL
227642	2006 BW_{103}	—	January 23, 2006	Mount Lemmon	Mount Lemmon Survey	·	4.0 km	MPC · JPL
227643	2006 BO_{107}	—	January 25, 2006	Kitt Peak	Spacewatch	·	2.5 km	MPC · JPL
227644	2006 BB_{110}	—	January 25, 2006	Kitt Peak	Spacewatch	·	2.6 km	MPC · JPL
227645	2006 BS_{110}	—	January 25, 2006	Kitt Peak	Spacewatch	KOR	2.2 km	MPC · JPL
227646	2006 BF_{120}	—	January 26, 2006	Kitt Peak	Spacewatch	·	2.5 km	MPC · JPL
227647	2006 BY_{120}	—	January 26, 2006	Kitt Peak	Spacewatch	·	3.5 km	MPC · JPL
227648	2006 BO_{128}	—	January 26, 2006	Mount Lemmon	Mount Lemmon Survey	·	3.6 km	MPC · JPL
227649	2006 BB_{133}	—	January 26, 2006	Kitt Peak	Spacewatch	·	5.1 km	MPC · JPL
227650	2006 BP_{134}	—	January 27, 2006	Mount Lemmon	Mount Lemmon Survey	THM	5.6 km	MPC · JPL
227651	2006 BH_{141}	—	January 25, 2006	Kitt Peak	Spacewatch	·	3.2 km	MPC · JPL
227652	2006 BY_{142}	—	January 26, 2006	Kitt Peak	Spacewatch	·	4.4 km	MPC · JPL
227653	2006 BQ_{143}	—	January 29, 2006	Junk Bond	D. Healy	KOR	1.7 km	MPC · JPL
227654	2006 BA_{150}	—	January 24, 2006	Anderson Mesa	LONEOS	EOS	3.1 km	MPC · JPL
227655	2006 BA_{152}	—	January 25, 2006	Kitt Peak	Spacewatch	KOR	1.7 km	MPC · JPL
227656	2006 BC_{157}	—	January 25, 2006	Kitt Peak	Spacewatch	·	5.6 km	MPC · JPL
227657	2006 BZ_{157}	—	January 25, 2006	Kitt Peak	Spacewatch	·	3.1 km	MPC · JPL
227658	2006 BK_{172}	—	January 27, 2006	Kitt Peak	Spacewatch	KOR	1.8 km	MPC · JPL
227659	2006 BU_{173}	—	January 27, 2006	Kitt Peak	Spacewatch	·	2.0 km	MPC · JPL
227660	2006 BD_{174}	—	January 27, 2006	Kitt Peak	Spacewatch	·	4.7 km	MPC · JPL
227661	2006 BO_{192}	—	January 30, 2006	Kitt Peak	Spacewatch	EOS	2.8 km	MPC · JPL
227662	2006 BR_{199}	—	January 30, 2006	Kitt Peak	Spacewatch	THM	3.1 km	MPC · JPL
227663	2006 BF_{201}	—	January 31, 2006	Mount Lemmon	Mount Lemmon Survey	·	1.9 km	MPC · JPL
227664	2006 BZ_{201}	—	January 31, 2006	Kitt Peak	Spacewatch	KOR	2.0 km	MPC · JPL
227665	2006 BD_{204}	—	January 31, 2006	Kitt Peak	Spacewatch	·	2.7 km	MPC · JPL
227666	2006 BC_{208}	—	January 31, 2006	Catalina	CSS	·	5.7 km	MPC · JPL
227667	2006 BG_{210}	—	January 31, 2006	Catalina	CSS	EOS	2.8 km	MPC · JPL
227668	2006 BE_{227}	—	January 30, 2006	Kitt Peak	Spacewatch	·	3.2 km	MPC · JPL
227669	2006 BH_{231}	—	January 31, 2006	Kitt Peak	Spacewatch	·	2.6 km	MPC · JPL
227670	2006 BZ_{238}	—	January 31, 2006	Mount Lemmon	Mount Lemmon Survey	HOF	3.6 km	MPC · JPL
227671	2006 BT_{250}	—	January 31, 2006	Kitt Peak	Spacewatch	·	3.2 km	MPC · JPL
227672	2006 BK_{260}	—	January 31, 2006	Kitt Peak	Spacewatch	·	3.8 km	MPC · JPL
227673	2006 CQ_{12}	—	February 1, 2006	Kitt Peak	Spacewatch	·	1.9 km	MPC · JPL
227674	2006 CY_{13}	—	February 1, 2006	Kitt Peak	Spacewatch	·	3.3 km	MPC · JPL
227675	2006 CM_{17}	—	February 1, 2006	Mount Lemmon	Mount Lemmon Survey	·	4.4 km	MPC · JPL
227676	2006 CA_{18}	—	February 1, 2006	Kitt Peak	Spacewatch	·	3.0 km	MPC · JPL
227677	2006 CT_{19}	—	February 1, 2006	Mount Lemmon	Mount Lemmon Survey	·	3.4 km	MPC · JPL
227678	2006 CS_{22}	—	February 1, 2006	Mount Lemmon	Mount Lemmon Survey	·	4.0 km	MPC · JPL
227679	2006 CG_{33}	—	February 2, 2006	Catalina	CSS	GEF	1.7 km	MPC · JPL
227680	2006 CR_{35}	—	February 2, 2006	Catalina	CSS	HOF	4.6 km	MPC · JPL
227681	2006 CJ_{42}	—	February 2, 2006	Kitt Peak	Spacewatch	EOS	2.6 km	MPC · JPL
227682	2006 CP_{48}	—	February 3, 2006	Mount Lemmon	Mount Lemmon Survey	·	2.2 km	MPC · JPL
227683	2006 CO_{49}	—	February 3, 2006	Socorro	LINEAR	·	3.1 km	MPC · JPL
227684	2006 CQ_{62}	—	February 9, 2006	Palomar	NEAT	·	3.7 km	MPC · JPL
227685	2006 CR_{62}	—	February 9, 2006	Palomar	NEAT	·	2.5 km	MPC · JPL
227686	2006 DQ_{2}	—	February 20, 2006	Kitt Peak	Spacewatch	THM	3.6 km	MPC · JPL
227687	2006 DE_{6}	—	February 20, 2006	Catalina	CSS	EOS	3.0 km	MPC · JPL
227688	2006 DN_{16}	—	February 20, 2006	Kitt Peak	Spacewatch	EOS	2.4 km	MPC · JPL
227689	2006 DA_{17}	—	February 20, 2006	Kitt Peak	Spacewatch	KOR	1.5 km	MPC · JPL
227690	2006 DK_{23}	—	February 20, 2006	Kitt Peak	Spacewatch	·	2.0 km	MPC · JPL
227691	2006 DA_{24}	—	February 20, 2006	Kitt Peak	Spacewatch	·	3.2 km	MPC · JPL
227692	2006 DZ_{33}	—	February 20, 2006	Kitt Peak	Spacewatch	·	6.0 km	MPC · JPL
227693	2006 DR_{36}	—	February 20, 2006	Kitt Peak	Spacewatch	·	1.6 km	MPC · JPL
227694	2006 DF_{39}	—	February 21, 2006	Mount Lemmon	Mount Lemmon Survey	·	3.8 km	MPC · JPL
227695	2006 DK_{44}	—	February 20, 2006	Catalina	CSS	·	5.5 km	MPC · JPL
227696	2006 DN_{49}	—	February 21, 2006	Mount Lemmon	Mount Lemmon Survey	·	2.4 km	MPC · JPL
227697	2006 DG_{57}	—	February 24, 2006	Catalina	CSS	·	6.7 km	MPC · JPL
227698	2006 DL_{60}	—	February 24, 2006	Kitt Peak	Spacewatch	·	3.4 km	MPC · JPL
227699	2006 DB_{62}	—	February 24, 2006	Catalina	CSS	·	6.7 km	MPC · JPL
227700	2006 DV_{65}	—	February 21, 2006	Anderson Mesa	LONEOS	·	2.1 km	MPC · JPL

== 227701–227800 ==
back to top

Designation			Discovery			Properties		Ref
Permanent	Provisional	Named after	Date	Site	Discoverer(s)	Category	Diam.	Ref
227701	2006 DJ_{74}	—	February 23, 2006	Anderson Mesa	LONEOS	·	3.1 km	MPC · JPL
227702	2006 DY_{80}	—	February 24, 2006	Kitt Peak	Spacewatch	·	4.3 km	MPC · JPL
227703	2006 DU_{82}	—	February 24, 2006	Kitt Peak	Spacewatch	·	2.3 km	MPC · JPL
227704	2006 DU_{86}	—	February 24, 2006	Kitt Peak	Spacewatch	·	3.2 km	MPC · JPL
227705	2006 DN_{90}	—	February 24, 2006	Kitt Peak	Spacewatch	·	2.6 km	MPC · JPL
227706	2006 DG_{93}	—	February 24, 2006	Kitt Peak	Spacewatch	·	2.8 km	MPC · JPL
227707	2006 DA_{102}	—	February 25, 2006	Kitt Peak	Spacewatch	·	2.6 km	MPC · JPL
227708	2006 DT_{102}	—	February 25, 2006	Mount Lemmon	Mount Lemmon Survey	KOR ·	2.4 km	MPC · JPL
227709	2006 DB_{110}	—	February 25, 2006	Mount Lemmon	Mount Lemmon Survey	·	3.6 km	MPC · JPL
227710	2006 DF_{111}	—	February 26, 2006	Anderson Mesa	LONEOS	·	5.3 km	MPC · JPL
227711 Dailyminorplanet	2006 DP_{114}	Dailyminorplanet	February 27, 2006	Catalina	CSS	·	7.5 km	MPC · JPL
227712	2006 DA_{116}	—	February 27, 2006	Kitt Peak	Spacewatch	·	3.4 km	MPC · JPL
227713	2006 DZ_{125}	—	February 25, 2006	Kitt Peak	Spacewatch	EOS	4.8 km	MPC · JPL
227714	2006 DQ_{142}	—	February 25, 2006	Kitt Peak	Spacewatch	·	3.5 km	MPC · JPL
227715	2006 DC_{169}	—	February 27, 2006	Kitt Peak	Spacewatch	·	3.5 km	MPC · JPL
227716	2006 DQ_{188}	—	February 27, 2006	Kitt Peak	Spacewatch	·	3.2 km	MPC · JPL
227717	2006 DL_{189}	—	February 27, 2006	Kitt Peak	Spacewatch	·	2.8 km	MPC · JPL
227718	2006 DC_{197}	—	February 24, 2006	Catalina	CSS	·	2.0 km	MPC · JPL
227719	2006 DK_{197}	—	February 24, 2006	Palomar	NEAT	·	3.6 km	MPC · JPL
227720	2006 DF_{207}	—	February 25, 2006	Kitt Peak	Spacewatch	·	4.0 km	MPC · JPL
227721	2006 DU_{208}	—	February 25, 2006	Mount Lemmon	Mount Lemmon Survey	·	5.4 km	MPC · JPL
227722	2006 EQ	—	March 4, 2006	Great Shefford	Birtwhistle, P.	·	4.7 km	MPC · JPL
227723	2006 EM_{8}	—	March 2, 2006	Kitt Peak	Spacewatch	·	3.2 km	MPC · JPL
227724	2006 EE_{21}	—	March 3, 2006	Kitt Peak	Spacewatch	·	2.8 km	MPC · JPL
227725	2006 EW_{28}	—	March 3, 2006	Kitt Peak	Spacewatch	·	2.0 km	MPC · JPL
227726	2006 EA_{29}	—	March 3, 2006	Kitt Peak	Spacewatch	·	1.9 km	MPC · JPL
227727	2006 EF_{35}	—	March 3, 2006	Kitt Peak	Spacewatch	·	3.0 km	MPC · JPL
227728	2006 EB_{43}	—	March 4, 2006	Catalina	CSS	·	6.8 km	MPC · JPL
227729	2006 EG_{56}	—	March 5, 2006	Kitt Peak	Spacewatch	·	4.1 km	MPC · JPL
227730	2006 EG_{60}	—	March 5, 2006	Kitt Peak	Spacewatch	·	3.2 km	MPC · JPL
227731	2006 EY_{62}	—	March 5, 2006	Kitt Peak	Spacewatch	·	5.0 km	MPC · JPL
227732	2006 FM_{2}	—	March 23, 2006	Mount Lemmon	Mount Lemmon Survey	·	4.0 km	MPC · JPL
227733	2006 FK_{14}	—	March 23, 2006	Kitt Peak	Spacewatch	HYG	4.0 km	MPC · JPL
227734	2006 FU_{14}	—	March 23, 2006	Kitt Peak	Spacewatch	·	3.2 km	MPC · JPL
227735	2006 FL_{16}	—	March 23, 2006	Mount Lemmon	Mount Lemmon Survey	·	2.7 km	MPC · JPL
227736	2006 FP_{19}	—	March 23, 2006	Mount Lemmon	Mount Lemmon Survey	THM	2.5 km	MPC · JPL
227737	2006 FW_{20}	—	March 24, 2006	Kitt Peak	Spacewatch	EOS	2.4 km	MPC · JPL
227738	2006 FT_{25}	—	March 24, 2006	Mount Lemmon	Mount Lemmon Survey	·	3.2 km	MPC · JPL
227739	2006 FV_{30}	—	March 25, 2006	Mount Lemmon	Mount Lemmon Survey	·	2.7 km	MPC · JPL
227740	2006 FT_{45}	—	March 24, 2006	Socorro	LINEAR	THM	3.4 km	MPC · JPL
227741	2006 GV_{17}	—	April 2, 2006	Kitt Peak	Spacewatch	THM	3.4 km	MPC · JPL
227742	2006 GQ_{49}	—	April 7, 2006	Catalina	CSS	LIX	6.6 km	MPC · JPL
227743	2006 HS_{11}	—	April 19, 2006	Mount Lemmon	Mount Lemmon Survey	·	4.2 km	MPC · JPL
227744	2006 HW_{22}	—	April 20, 2006	Kitt Peak	Spacewatch	·	4.0 km	MPC · JPL
227745	2006 HJ_{23}	—	April 20, 2006	Kitt Peak	Spacewatch	·	4.1 km	MPC · JPL
227746	2006 HJ_{36}	—	April 20, 2006	Catalina	CSS	·	5.3 km	MPC · JPL
227747	2006 HP_{54}	—	April 21, 2006	Catalina	CSS	·	4.7 km	MPC · JPL
227748	2006 HX_{56}	—	April 20, 2006	Catalina	CSS	·	4.1 km	MPC · JPL
227749	2006 HG_{58}	—	April 21, 2006	Ottmarsheim	C. Rinner	EOS	3.6 km	MPC · JPL
227750	2006 HV_{58}	—	April 21, 2006	Catalina	CSS	·	3.9 km	MPC · JPL
227751	2006 HN_{61}	—	April 24, 2006	Kitt Peak	Spacewatch	THM	3.1 km	MPC · JPL
227752	2006 HF_{88}	—	April 30, 2006	Kitt Peak	Spacewatch	·	2.2 km	MPC · JPL
227753	2006 HH_{88}	—	April 30, 2006	Kitt Peak	Spacewatch	·	2.6 km	MPC · JPL
227754	2006 HV_{108}	—	April 30, 2006	Catalina	CSS	EOS	3.1 km	MPC · JPL
227755	2006 JY_{8}	—	May 1, 2006	Kitt Peak	Spacewatch	3:2 · SHU	6.2 km	MPC · JPL
227756	2006 JL_{46}	—	May 5, 2006	Kitt Peak	Spacewatch	·	5.0 km	MPC · JPL
227757	2006 KX_{14}	—	May 20, 2006	Anderson Mesa	LONEOS	·	7.0 km	MPC · JPL
227758	2006 KN_{113}	—	May 21, 2006	Catalina	CSS	·	5.6 km	MPC · JPL
227759	2006 MQ_{10}	—	June 20, 2006	Kitt Peak	Spacewatch	L4	10 km	MPC · JPL
227760	2006 MZ_{13}	—	June 28, 2006	Siding Spring	SSS	H	1.1 km	MPC · JPL
227761	2006 QF_{6}	—	August 18, 2006	Socorro	LINEAR	H	950 m	MPC · JPL
227762	2006 QH_{163}	—	August 31, 2006	Siding Spring	SSS	H	840 m	MPC · JPL
227763	2006 RC_{2}	—	September 14, 2006	Catalina	CSS	H	640 m	MPC · JPL
227764	2006 SU_{59}	—	September 17, 2006	Catalina	CSS	·	940 m	MPC · JPL
227765	2006 SP_{393}	—	September 28, 2006	Mount Lemmon	Mount Lemmon Survey	·	1.4 km	MPC · JPL
227766	2006 TT_{87}	—	October 13, 2006	Kitt Peak	Spacewatch	·	900 m	MPC · JPL
227767 Enkibilal	2006 US_{62}	Enkibilal	October 20, 2006	Nogales	J.-C. Merlin	·	620 m	MPC · JPL
227768	2006 UM_{72}	—	October 17, 2006	Catalina	CSS	·	890 m	MPC · JPL
227769	2006 UX_{88}	—	October 17, 2006	Kitt Peak	Spacewatch	·	880 m	MPC · JPL
227770 Wischnewski	2006 US_{289}	Wischnewski	October 30, 2006	Altschwendt	W. Ries	·	790 m	MPC · JPL
227771	2006 VG_{35}	—	November 11, 2006	Mount Lemmon	Mount Lemmon Survey	·	980 m	MPC · JPL
227772	2006 VL_{37}	—	November 11, 2006	Catalina	CSS	·	770 m	MPC · JPL
227773	2006 VR_{91}	—	November 14, 2006	Mount Lemmon	Mount Lemmon Survey	·	1.6 km	MPC · JPL
227774	2006 VV_{95}	—	November 13, 2006	Kitt Peak	Spacewatch	·	960 m	MPC · JPL
227775	2006 VS_{110}	—	November 13, 2006	Kitt Peak	Spacewatch	·	1.1 km	MPC · JPL
227776	2006 VO_{124}	—	November 14, 2006	Kitt Peak	Spacewatch	·	870 m	MPC · JPL
227777	2006 VW_{127}	—	November 15, 2006	Kitt Peak	Spacewatch	·	910 m	MPC · JPL
227778	2006 VO_{133}	—	November 15, 2006	Socorro	LINEAR	·	1.4 km	MPC · JPL
227779	2006 VR_{136}	—	November 15, 2006	Kitt Peak	Spacewatch	·	1.5 km	MPC · JPL
227780	2006 WY_{75}	—	November 18, 2006	Kitt Peak	Spacewatch	·	890 m	MPC · JPL
227781	2006 WM_{153}	—	November 21, 2006	Mount Lemmon	Mount Lemmon Survey	·	1.5 km	MPC · JPL
227782	2006 WC_{178}	—	November 23, 2006	Mount Lemmon	Mount Lemmon Survey	·	900 m	MPC · JPL
227783	2006 WK_{178}	—	November 23, 2006	Kitt Peak	Spacewatch	·	2.0 km	MPC · JPL
227784	2006 WF_{198}	—	November 27, 2006	Mount Lemmon	Mount Lemmon Survey	MAS	730 m	MPC · JPL
227785	2006 WS_{203}	—	November 16, 2006	Mount Lemmon	Mount Lemmon Survey	·	860 m	MPC · JPL
227786	2006 WV_{203}	—	November 25, 2006	Kitt Peak	Spacewatch	·	800 m	MPC · JPL
227787	2006 XO_{28}	—	December 13, 2006	Kitt Peak	Spacewatch	·	1.1 km	MPC · JPL
227788	2006 XQ_{49}	—	December 13, 2006	Mount Lemmon	Mount Lemmon Survey	·	1.1 km	MPC · JPL
227789	2006 XG_{58}	—	December 14, 2006	Kitt Peak	Spacewatch	·	1.8 km	MPC · JPL
227790	2006 XK_{59}	—	December 14, 2006	Kitt Peak	Spacewatch	MAS	890 m	MPC · JPL
227791	2006 XZ_{59}	—	December 14, 2006	Kitt Peak	Spacewatch	·	810 m	MPC · JPL
227792	2006 XW_{69}	—	December 11, 2006	Kitt Peak	Spacewatch	V	960 m	MPC · JPL
227793	2006 YS_{8}	—	December 20, 2006	Mount Lemmon	Mount Lemmon Survey	·	2.2 km	MPC · JPL
227794	2006 YZ_{9}	—	December 21, 2006	Kitt Peak	Spacewatch	·	1.2 km	MPC · JPL
227795	2006 YH_{19}	—	December 24, 2006	Mount Lemmon	Mount Lemmon Survey	NYS	1.4 km	MPC · JPL
227796	2006 YY_{30}	—	December 21, 2006	Kitt Peak	Spacewatch	·	1.1 km	MPC · JPL
227797	2006 YR_{32}	—	December 21, 2006	Kitt Peak	Spacewatch	·	1.9 km	MPC · JPL
227798	2006 YY_{37}	—	December 21, 2006	Kitt Peak	Spacewatch	·	1.7 km	MPC · JPL
227799	2006 YG_{45}	—	December 21, 2006	Kitt Peak	Spacewatch	·	1.0 km	MPC · JPL
227800	2006 YN_{50}	—	December 21, 2006	Kitt Peak	M. W. Buie	·	980 m	MPC · JPL

== 227801–227900 ==
back to top

Designation			Discovery			Properties		Ref
Permanent	Provisional	Named after	Date	Site	Discoverer(s)	Category	Diam.	Ref
227801	2007 AZ_{13}	—	January 9, 2007	Mount Lemmon	Mount Lemmon Survey	·	1.0 km	MPC · JPL
227802	2007 AA_{16}	—	January 10, 2007	Catalina	CSS	·	1.0 km	MPC · JPL
227803	2007 AD_{21}	—	January 10, 2007	Mount Lemmon	Mount Lemmon Survey	·	1.5 km	MPC · JPL
227804	2007 BQ	—	January 16, 2007	Socorro	LINEAR	·	1.1 km	MPC · JPL
227805	2007 BF_{1}	—	January 16, 2007	Catalina	CSS	NYS	1.5 km	MPC · JPL
227806	2007 BF_{6}	—	January 17, 2007	Palomar	NEAT	·	1.2 km	MPC · JPL
227807	2007 BL_{18}	—	January 17, 2007	Palomar	NEAT	NYS	1.3 km	MPC · JPL
227808	2007 BK_{21}	—	January 24, 2007	Socorro	LINEAR	·	670 m	MPC · JPL
227809	2007 BA_{38}	—	January 24, 2007	Mount Lemmon	Mount Lemmon Survey	·	1.7 km	MPC · JPL
227810	2007 BM_{43}	—	January 24, 2007	Mount Lemmon	Mount Lemmon Survey	·	2.4 km	MPC · JPL
227811	2007 BW_{43}	—	January 24, 2007	Catalina	CSS	·	740 m	MPC · JPL
227812	2007 BJ_{47}	—	January 26, 2007	Kitt Peak	Spacewatch	·	1.9 km	MPC · JPL
227813	2007 BD_{50}	—	January 27, 2007	Mount Lemmon	Mount Lemmon Survey	·	1.2 km	MPC · JPL
227814	2007 BE_{50}	—	January 28, 2007	Marly	P. Kocher	·	1.2 km	MPC · JPL
227815	2007 BN_{65}	—	January 27, 2007	Mount Lemmon	Mount Lemmon Survey	·	1.9 km	MPC · JPL
227816	2007 BL_{66}	—	January 27, 2007	Mount Lemmon	Mount Lemmon Survey	V	790 m	MPC · JPL
227817	2007 BF_{69}	—	January 27, 2007	Mount Lemmon	Mount Lemmon Survey	NYS	1.6 km	MPC · JPL
227818	2007 BE_{71}	—	January 28, 2007	Mount Lemmon	Mount Lemmon Survey	·	1.3 km	MPC · JPL
227819	2007 BY_{79}	—	January 29, 2007	Kitt Peak	Spacewatch	·	1.7 km	MPC · JPL
227820	2007 BL_{101}	—	January 28, 2007	Mount Lemmon	Mount Lemmon Survey	·	2.0 km	MPC · JPL
227821	2007 CW_{4}	—	February 6, 2007	Mount Lemmon	Mount Lemmon Survey	·	850 m	MPC · JPL
227822	2007 CS_{7}	—	February 6, 2007	Kitt Peak	Spacewatch	V	670 m	MPC · JPL
227823	2007 CK_{19}	—	February 5, 2007	Palomar	NEAT	(2076)	1.3 km	MPC · JPL
227824	2007 CX_{22}	—	February 6, 2007	Mount Lemmon	Mount Lemmon Survey	·	1.1 km	MPC · JPL
227825	2007 CE_{23}	—	February 6, 2007	Lulin	Lin, H.-C., Q. Ye	NYS	1.8 km	MPC · JPL
227826	2007 CG_{25}	—	February 8, 2007	Kitt Peak	Spacewatch	·	1.3 km	MPC · JPL
227827	2007 CL_{25}	—	February 8, 2007	Kitt Peak	Spacewatch	·	1.7 km	MPC · JPL
227828	2007 CA_{38}	—	February 6, 2007	Kitt Peak	Spacewatch	·	2.2 km	MPC · JPL
227829	2007 CQ_{38}	—	February 6, 2007	Mount Lemmon	Mount Lemmon Survey	V	750 m	MPC · JPL
227830	2007 CG_{40}	—	February 6, 2007	Kitt Peak	Spacewatch	·	1.3 km	MPC · JPL
227831	2007 CV_{41}	—	February 7, 2007	Kitt Peak	Spacewatch	·	1.4 km	MPC · JPL
227832	2007 CW_{41}	—	February 7, 2007	Kitt Peak	Spacewatch	·	1.5 km	MPC · JPL
227833	2007 CJ_{50}	—	February 8, 2007	Palomar	NEAT	V	1.1 km	MPC · JPL
227834	2007 CP_{50}	—	February 9, 2007	Kitt Peak	Spacewatch	·	1.4 km	MPC · JPL
227835	2007 CM_{51}	—	February 14, 2007	Črni Vrh	J. Skvarč, H. Mikuž	·	1.8 km	MPC · JPL
227836	2007 CJ_{53}	—	February 15, 2007	Catalina	CSS	·	1.0 km	MPC · JPL
227837	2007 CX_{56}	—	February 15, 2007	Catalina	CSS	NYS	1.7 km	MPC · JPL
227838	2007 CE_{63}	—	February 15, 2007	Catalina	CSS	·	1.5 km	MPC · JPL
227839	2007 CC_{73}	—	February 14, 2007	Mauna Kea	Mauna Kea	·	730 m	MPC · JPL
227840	2007 DC_{1}	—	February 16, 2007	Calvin-Rehoboth	Calvin College	MAS	880 m	MPC · JPL
227841	2007 DY_{4}	—	February 17, 2007	Kitt Peak	Spacewatch	·	1.1 km	MPC · JPL
227842	2007 DK_{7}	—	February 17, 2007	Calvin-Rehoboth	Calvin College	MAS	760 m	MPC · JPL
227843	2007 DC_{20}	—	February 17, 2007	Kitt Peak	Spacewatch	·	2.0 km	MPC · JPL
227844	2007 DL_{21}	—	February 17, 2007	Kitt Peak	Spacewatch	·	1.7 km	MPC · JPL
227845	2007 DE_{24}	—	February 17, 2007	Kitt Peak	Spacewatch	NYS ·	2.3 km	MPC · JPL
227846	2007 DQ_{31}	—	February 17, 2007	Kitt Peak	Spacewatch	·	2.1 km	MPC · JPL
227847	2007 DZ_{34}	—	February 17, 2007	Kitt Peak	Spacewatch	MAS	940 m	MPC · JPL
227848	2007 DF_{35}	—	February 17, 2007	Kitt Peak	Spacewatch	·	2.6 km	MPC · JPL
227849	2007 DX_{36}	—	February 17, 2007	Kitt Peak	Spacewatch	·	1.0 km	MPC · JPL
227850	2007 DV_{37}	—	February 17, 2007	Kitt Peak	Spacewatch	MAS	1 km	MPC · JPL
227851	2007 DG_{39}	—	February 17, 2007	Kitt Peak	Spacewatch	·	1.7 km	MPC · JPL
227852	2007 DX_{46}	—	February 21, 2007	Socorro	LINEAR	MAS	960 m	MPC · JPL
227853	2007 DH_{47}	—	February 21, 2007	Mount Lemmon	Mount Lemmon Survey	MAS	870 m	MPC · JPL
227854	2007 DS_{49}	—	February 16, 2007	Catalina	CSS	·	1.8 km	MPC · JPL
227855	2007 DK_{53}	—	February 19, 2007	Mount Lemmon	Mount Lemmon Survey	·	1.2 km	MPC · JPL
227856	2007 DQ_{64}	—	February 21, 2007	Kitt Peak	Spacewatch	·	1.2 km	MPC · JPL
227857	2007 DW_{68}	—	February 21, 2007	Kitt Peak	Spacewatch	·	2.1 km	MPC · JPL
227858	2007 DE_{72}	—	February 21, 2007	Kitt Peak	Spacewatch	·	770 m	MPC · JPL
227859	2007 DW_{76}	—	February 22, 2007	Anderson Mesa	LONEOS	·	1.9 km	MPC · JPL
227860	2007 DK_{79}	—	February 23, 2007	Kitt Peak	Spacewatch	·	1.0 km	MPC · JPL
227861	2007 DM_{82}	—	February 23, 2007	Catalina	CSS	·	2.4 km	MPC · JPL
227862	2007 DX_{87}	—	February 23, 2007	Kitt Peak	Spacewatch	·	2.9 km	MPC · JPL
227863	2007 DQ_{93}	—	February 23, 2007	Kitt Peak	Spacewatch	NYS ·	1.9 km	MPC · JPL
227864	2007 DL_{95}	—	February 23, 2007	Kitt Peak	Spacewatch	·	2.4 km	MPC · JPL
227865	2007 DY_{96}	—	February 23, 2007	Kitt Peak	Spacewatch	·	2.5 km	MPC · JPL
227866	2007 DQ_{97}	—	February 23, 2007	Kitt Peak	Spacewatch	·	1.5 km	MPC · JPL
227867	2007 DZ_{97}	—	February 23, 2007	Kitt Peak	Spacewatch	·	1.1 km	MPC · JPL
227868	2007 DQ_{112}	—	February 26, 2007	Mount Lemmon	Mount Lemmon Survey	·	1.6 km	MPC · JPL
227869	2007 DD_{113}	—	February 17, 2007	Kitt Peak	Spacewatch	·	1.8 km	MPC · JPL
227870	2007 DH_{115}	—	February 26, 2007	Mount Lemmon	Mount Lemmon Survey	·	1.5 km	MPC · JPL
227871	2007 EK_{8}	—	March 9, 2007	Mount Lemmon	Mount Lemmon Survey	·	1.3 km	MPC · JPL
227872	2007 EP_{8}	—	March 9, 2007	Mount Lemmon	Mount Lemmon Survey	·	3.0 km	MPC · JPL
227873	2007 EW_{10}	—	March 9, 2007	Kitt Peak	Spacewatch	·	2.4 km	MPC · JPL
227874	2007 ER_{11}	—	March 9, 2007	Kitt Peak	Spacewatch	·	1.5 km	MPC · JPL
227875	2007 EH_{16}	—	March 9, 2007	Mount Lemmon	Mount Lemmon Survey	MAS	1.1 km	MPC · JPL
227876	2007 EO_{18}	—	March 9, 2007	Palomar	NEAT	·	2.8 km	MPC · JPL
227877	2007 ER_{21}	—	March 10, 2007	Kitt Peak	Spacewatch	·	2.5 km	MPC · JPL
227878	2007 EH_{22}	—	March 10, 2007	Mount Lemmon	Mount Lemmon Survey	NYS	1.5 km	MPC · JPL
227879	2007 EG_{25}	—	March 10, 2007	Mount Lemmon	Mount Lemmon Survey	·	2.4 km	MPC · JPL
227880	2007 ET_{25}	—	March 10, 2007	Palomar	NEAT	·	1.5 km	MPC · JPL
227881	2007 EX_{27}	—	March 9, 2007	Catalina	CSS	·	1.1 km	MPC · JPL
227882	2007 EE_{32}	—	March 10, 2007	Kitt Peak	Spacewatch	·	1.3 km	MPC · JPL
227883	2007 EU_{35}	—	March 11, 2007	Mount Lemmon	Mount Lemmon Survey	·	1.5 km	MPC · JPL
227884	2007 EU_{42}	—	March 9, 2007	Kitt Peak	Spacewatch	HOF	3.3 km	MPC · JPL
227885	2007 EY_{42}	—	March 9, 2007	Kitt Peak	Spacewatch	·	2.6 km	MPC · JPL
227886	2007 EN_{45}	—	March 9, 2007	Kitt Peak	Spacewatch	·	1.8 km	MPC · JPL
227887	2007 EK_{46}	—	March 9, 2007	Kitt Peak	Spacewatch	·	2.1 km	MPC · JPL
227888	2007 EF_{48}	—	March 9, 2007	Kitt Peak	Spacewatch	·	2.6 km	MPC · JPL
227889	2007 EC_{49}	—	March 9, 2007	Kitt Peak	Spacewatch	·	900 m	MPC · JPL
227890	2007 EJ_{57}	—	March 9, 2007	Kitt Peak	Spacewatch	·	980 m	MPC · JPL
227891	2007 ET_{69}	—	March 10, 2007	Kitt Peak	Spacewatch	·	1.3 km	MPC · JPL
227892	2007 EA_{70}	—	March 10, 2007	Kitt Peak	Spacewatch	·	3.9 km	MPC · JPL
227893	2007 EZ_{79}	—	March 10, 2007	Kitt Peak	Spacewatch	·	2.3 km	MPC · JPL
227894	2007 EX_{91}	—	March 10, 2007	Kitt Peak	Spacewatch	·	1.4 km	MPC · JPL
227895	2007 EY_{112}	—	March 11, 2007	Kitt Peak	Spacewatch	·	3.5 km	MPC · JPL
227896	2007 EV_{118}	—	March 13, 2007	Mount Lemmon	Mount Lemmon Survey	(21344)	2.2 km	MPC · JPL
227897	2007 ES_{126}	—	March 9, 2007	Palomar	NEAT	·	860 m	MPC · JPL
227898	2007 EZ_{126}	—	March 9, 2007	Mount Lemmon	Mount Lemmon Survey	NYS	1.4 km	MPC · JPL
227899	2007 EF_{128}	—	March 9, 2007	Mount Lemmon	Mount Lemmon Survey	·	1.9 km	MPC · JPL
227900	2007 EU_{132}	—	March 9, 2007	Mount Lemmon	Mount Lemmon Survey	MAS	710 m	MPC · JPL

== 227901–228000 ==
back to top

Designation			Discovery			Properties		Ref
Permanent	Provisional	Named after	Date	Site	Discoverer(s)	Category	Diam.	Ref
227901	2007 EB_{141}	—	March 12, 2007	Kitt Peak	Spacewatch	·	2.7 km	MPC · JPL
227902	2007 EV_{156}	—	March 12, 2007	Kitt Peak	Spacewatch	·	4.2 km	MPC · JPL
227903	2007 EE_{165}	—	March 15, 2007	Mount Lemmon	Mount Lemmon Survey	526	3.8 km	MPC · JPL
227904	2007 EB_{168}	—	March 13, 2007	Kitt Peak	Spacewatch	·	2.2 km	MPC · JPL
227905	2007 EN_{171}	—	March 11, 2007	Mount Lemmon	Mount Lemmon Survey	·	2.8 km	MPC · JPL
227906	2007 EU_{175}	—	March 14, 2007	Kitt Peak	Spacewatch	·	3.7 km	MPC · JPL
227907	2007 EO_{180}	—	March 14, 2007	Mount Lemmon	Mount Lemmon Survey	·	4.3 km	MPC · JPL
227908	2007 EU_{182}	—	March 14, 2007	Kitt Peak	Spacewatch	·	1.7 km	MPC · JPL
227909	2007 ED_{188}	—	March 9, 2007	Catalina	CSS	·	1.5 km	MPC · JPL
227910	2007 ER_{194}	—	March 15, 2007	Kitt Peak	Spacewatch	NYS	1.2 km	MPC · JPL
227911	2007 EC_{197}	—	March 15, 2007	Kitt Peak	Spacewatch	·	1.7 km	MPC · JPL
227912	2007 EJ_{197}	—	March 15, 2007	Kitt Peak	Spacewatch	·	2.0 km	MPC · JPL
227913	2007 EJ_{203}	—	March 10, 2007	Kitt Peak	Spacewatch	(12739)	2.3 km	MPC · JPL
227914	2007 ET_{208}	—	March 14, 2007	Mount Lemmon	Mount Lemmon Survey	·	1.7 km	MPC · JPL
227915	2007 FQ	—	March 16, 2007	Mount Lemmon	Mount Lemmon Survey	·	2.1 km	MPC · JPL
227916	2007 FZ_{11}	—	March 17, 2007	Anderson Mesa	LONEOS	NYS	1.4 km	MPC · JPL
227917	2007 FC_{24}	—	March 20, 2007	Kitt Peak	Spacewatch	·	1.3 km	MPC · JPL
227918	2007 FR_{25}	—	March 20, 2007	Kitt Peak	Spacewatch	NYS	1.6 km	MPC · JPL
227919	2007 FB_{36}	—	March 26, 2007	Kitt Peak	Spacewatch	(5)	1.1 km	MPC · JPL
227920	2007 FS_{36}	—	March 26, 2007	Kitt Peak	Spacewatch	·	1.8 km	MPC · JPL
227921	2007 FF_{37}	—	March 26, 2007	Mount Lemmon	Mount Lemmon Survey	·	3.6 km	MPC · JPL
227922	2007 FQ_{37}	—	March 26, 2007	Mount Lemmon	Mount Lemmon Survey	·	2.2 km	MPC · JPL
227923	2007 FD_{38}	—	March 26, 2007	Kitt Peak	Spacewatch	·	2.1 km	MPC · JPL
227924	2007 FW_{43}	—	March 26, 2007	Catalina	CSS	·	3.0 km	MPC · JPL
227925	2007 FS_{44}	—	March 25, 2007	Catalina	CSS	·	4.5 km	MPC · JPL
227926	2007 FX_{48}	—	March 26, 2007	Kitt Peak	Spacewatch	·	1.9 km	MPC · JPL
227927	2007 GB	—	April 3, 2007	Palomar	NEAT	·	3.9 km	MPC · JPL
227928 Ludoferrière	2007 GT_{1}	Ludoferrière	April 6, 2007	Vicques	M. Ory	·	5.0 km	MPC · JPL
227929	2007 GT_{4}	—	April 11, 2007	Vicques	M. Ory	(13314)	2.5 km	MPC · JPL
227930 Athos	2007 GG_{6}	Athos	April 14, 2007	Saint-Sulpice	B. Christophe	·	4.1 km	MPC · JPL
227931	2007 GV_{6}	—	April 7, 2007	Mount Lemmon	Mount Lemmon Survey	(12739)	2.0 km	MPC · JPL
227932	2007 GT_{7}	—	April 7, 2007	Mount Lemmon	Mount Lemmon Survey	KOR	1.4 km	MPC · JPL
227933	2007 GV_{15}	—	April 11, 2007	Mount Lemmon	Mount Lemmon Survey	MAS	740 m	MPC · JPL
227934	2007 GQ_{16}	—	April 11, 2007	Kitt Peak	Spacewatch	HOF	3.8 km	MPC · JPL
227935	2007 GY_{20}	—	April 11, 2007	Mount Lemmon	Mount Lemmon Survey	KOR	1.8 km	MPC · JPL
227936	2007 GA_{22}	—	April 11, 2007	Mount Lemmon	Mount Lemmon Survey	·	3.9 km	MPC · JPL
227937	2007 GH_{22}	—	April 11, 2007	Mount Lemmon	Mount Lemmon Survey	·	2.2 km	MPC · JPL
227938	2007 GD_{26}	—	April 14, 2007	Mount Lemmon	Mount Lemmon Survey	·	2.8 km	MPC · JPL
227939	2007 GK_{29}	—	April 11, 2007	Kitt Peak	Spacewatch	·	3.5 km	MPC · JPL
227940	2007 GV_{29}	—	April 13, 2007	Siding Spring	SSS	·	5.4 km	MPC · JPL
227941	2007 GF_{36}	—	April 14, 2007	Kitt Peak	Spacewatch	·	3.4 km	MPC · JPL
227942	2007 GE_{38}	—	April 14, 2007	Kitt Peak	Spacewatch	·	2.1 km	MPC · JPL
227943	2007 GJ_{38}	—	April 14, 2007	Kitt Peak	Spacewatch	·	2.6 km	MPC · JPL
227944	2007 GW_{38}	—	April 14, 2007	Kitt Peak	Spacewatch	·	1.4 km	MPC · JPL
227945	2007 GX_{40}	—	April 14, 2007	Kitt Peak	Spacewatch	·	3.0 km	MPC · JPL
227946	2007 GW_{41}	—	April 14, 2007	Kitt Peak	Spacewatch	·	1.5 km	MPC · JPL
227947	2007 GH_{42}	—	April 14, 2007	Kitt Peak	Spacewatch	AGN	1.4 km	MPC · JPL
227948	2007 GU_{46}	—	April 14, 2007	Kitt Peak	Spacewatch	EUN	1.4 km	MPC · JPL
227949	2007 GS_{49}	—	April 15, 2007	Socorro	LINEAR	·	3.3 km	MPC · JPL
227950	2007 GF_{57}	—	April 15, 2007	Kitt Peak	Spacewatch	·	1.4 km	MPC · JPL
227951	2007 GO_{59}	—	April 15, 2007	Kitt Peak	Spacewatch	EUN	1.5 km	MPC · JPL
227952	2007 GY_{60}	—	April 15, 2007	Kitt Peak	Spacewatch	·	3.0 km	MPC · JPL
227953	2007 GJ_{61}	—	April 15, 2007	Kitt Peak	Spacewatch	·	3.2 km	MPC · JPL
227954	2007 GZ_{65}	—	April 15, 2007	Catalina	CSS	·	8.8 km	MPC · JPL
227955	2007 GQ_{67}	—	April 15, 2007	Kitt Peak	Spacewatch	EOS	3.2 km	MPC · JPL
227956	2007 GG_{69}	—	April 15, 2007	Mount Lemmon	Mount Lemmon Survey	AST	2.3 km	MPC · JPL
227957	2007 GR_{69}	—	April 15, 2007	Mount Lemmon	Mount Lemmon Survey	AST	3.3 km	MPC · JPL
227958	2007 HH	—	April 16, 2007	7300	W. K. Y. Yeung	NEM	3.7 km	MPC · JPL
227959	2007 HS_{5}	—	April 16, 2007	Catalina	CSS	·	4.2 km	MPC · JPL
227960	2007 HN_{7}	—	April 16, 2007	Socorro	LINEAR	·	5.5 km	MPC · JPL
227961	2007 HO_{10}	—	April 18, 2007	Mount Lemmon	Mount Lemmon Survey	EUN	1.3 km	MPC · JPL
227962 Aramis	2007 HQ_{14}	Aramis	April 19, 2007	Saint-Sulpice	B. Christophe	·	4.5 km	MPC · JPL
227963	2007 HR_{17}	—	April 16, 2007	Socorro	LINEAR	·	3.5 km	MPC · JPL
227964	2007 HE_{21}	—	April 18, 2007	Kitt Peak	Spacewatch	·	2.7 km	MPC · JPL
227965	2007 HC_{22}	—	April 18, 2007	Kitt Peak	Spacewatch	EOS	3.0 km	MPC · JPL
227966	2007 HM_{23}	—	April 18, 2007	Kitt Peak	Spacewatch	HOF	3.5 km	MPC · JPL
227967	2007 HN_{23}	—	April 18, 2007	Kitt Peak	Spacewatch	·	3.4 km	MPC · JPL
227968	2007 HZ_{27}	—	April 18, 2007	Kitt Peak	Spacewatch	·	3.9 km	MPC · JPL
227969	2007 HL_{29}	—	April 19, 2007	Mount Lemmon	Mount Lemmon Survey	·	1.9 km	MPC · JPL
227970	2007 HL_{32}	—	April 19, 2007	Mount Lemmon	Mount Lemmon Survey	·	2.7 km	MPC · JPL
227971	2007 HY_{36}	—	April 19, 2007	Kitt Peak	Spacewatch	EOS	4.0 km	MPC · JPL
227972	2007 HG_{41}	—	April 20, 2007	Kitt Peak	Spacewatch	EOS	2.8 km	MPC · JPL
227973	2007 HJ_{48}	—	April 20, 2007	Kitt Peak	Spacewatch	·	3.8 km	MPC · JPL
227974	2007 HX_{48}	—	April 20, 2007	Kitt Peak	Spacewatch	·	2.6 km	MPC · JPL
227975	2007 HL_{63}	—	April 22, 2007	Mount Lemmon	Mount Lemmon Survey	·	2.1 km	MPC · JPL
227976	2007 HP_{75}	—	April 22, 2007	Mount Lemmon	Mount Lemmon Survey	·	3.8 km	MPC · JPL
227977	2007 HV_{79}	—	April 24, 2007	Kitt Peak	Spacewatch	EOS	2.6 km	MPC · JPL
227978	2007 HD_{81}	—	April 25, 2007	Mount Lemmon	Mount Lemmon Survey	·	3.5 km	MPC · JPL
227979	2007 HG_{87}	—	April 24, 2007	Kitt Peak	Spacewatch	·	3.8 km	MPC · JPL
227980	2007 HA_{88}	—	April 27, 2007	Desert Moon	Stevens, B. L.	·	3.0 km	MPC · JPL
227981	2007 HT_{96}	—	April 20, 2007	Kitt Peak	Spacewatch	·	1.6 km	MPC · JPL
227982	2007 JG_{1}	—	May 7, 2007	Kitt Peak	Spacewatch	HYG	3.1 km	MPC · JPL
227983	2007 JR_{1}	—	May 7, 2007	Catalina	CSS	·	5.5 km	MPC · JPL
227984	2007 JX_{1}	—	May 7, 2007	Catalina	CSS	EOS	3.4 km	MPC · JPL
227985	2007 JN_{2}	—	May 8, 2007	Anderson Mesa	LONEOS	·	2.8 km	MPC · JPL
227986	2007 JP_{2}	—	May 7, 2007	Lulin	LUSS	EOS	3.1 km	MPC · JPL
227987	2007 JL_{3}	—	May 6, 2007	Kitt Peak	Spacewatch	·	3.4 km	MPC · JPL
227988	2007 JR_{5}	—	May 9, 2007	Mount Lemmon	Mount Lemmon Survey	·	3.2 km	MPC · JPL
227989	2007 JP_{7}	—	May 9, 2007	Mount Lemmon	Mount Lemmon Survey	AST	2.2 km	MPC · JPL
227990	2007 JQ_{9}	—	May 7, 2007	Lulin	Lulin	·	5.2 km	MPC · JPL
227991	2007 JJ_{10}	—	May 7, 2007	Kitt Peak	Spacewatch	EUN	2.5 km	MPC · JPL
227992	2007 JM_{17}	—	May 7, 2007	Kitt Peak	Spacewatch	HYG	3.2 km	MPC · JPL
227993	2007 JO_{17}	—	May 7, 2007	Kitt Peak	Spacewatch	·	2.2 km	MPC · JPL
227994	2007 JB_{19}	—	May 9, 2007	Kitt Peak	Spacewatch	EOS	2.4 km	MPC · JPL
227995	2007 JS_{21}	—	May 9, 2007	Mount Lemmon	Mount Lemmon Survey	·	3.5 km	MPC · JPL
227996	2007 JM_{38}	—	May 12, 2007	Mount Lemmon	Mount Lemmon Survey	·	2.0 km	MPC · JPL
227997 NIGLAS	2007 KU_{7}	NIGLAS	May 16, 2007	XuYi	PMO NEO Survey Program	·	5.9 km	MPC · JPL
227998	2007 LD_{2}	—	June 7, 2007	Kitt Peak	Spacewatch	·	3.5 km	MPC · JPL
227999	2007 LY_{24}	—	June 14, 2007	Kitt Peak	Spacewatch	·	3.5 km	MPC · JPL
228000	2007 MJ_{1}	—	June 16, 2007	Kitt Peak	Spacewatch	·	5.9 km	MPC · JPL

back to top

== See also ==
- Meanings of minor-planet names: 227001–228000
