= Giovanni Battista Zupi =

Italian astronomer, mathematician and Jesuit priest (1589–1667)

Giovanni Battista Zupi or Zupus (2 November 1589 – 26 August 1667) was an Italian astronomer, mathematician, and Jesuit priest.

He was born in Catanzaro. In 1639, Giovanni was the first person to discover that the planet Mercury had orbital phases, like those of the Moon and Venus. His observations demonstrated that the planet orbited around the Sun.

He died in Naples.

The crater Zupus on the Moon is named after him.

The asteroid 227152 Zupi is named after him.

== See also ==
- List of Jesuit scientists
- List of Roman Catholic scientist-clerics
