= Meanings of minor-planet names: 229001–230000 =

As minor planet discoveries are confirmed, they are given a permanent number by the IAU's Minor Planet Center (MPC), and the discoverers can then submit names for them, following the IAU's naming conventions. The list below concerns those minor planets in the specified number-range that have received names, and explains the meanings of those names.

Official naming citations of newly named small Solar System bodies are approved and published in a bulletin by IAU's Working Group for Small Bodies Nomenclature (WGSBN). Before May 2021, citations were published in MPC's Minor Planet Circulars for many decades. Recent citations can also be found on the JPL Small-Body Database (SBDB). Until his death in 2016, German astronomer Lutz D. Schmadel compiled these citations into the Dictionary of Minor Planet Names (DMP) and regularly updated the collection.

Based on Paul Herget's The Names of the Minor Planets, Schmadel also researched the unclear origin of numerous asteroids, most of which had been named prior to World War II. This article incorporates text from this source, which is in the public domain: SBDB New namings may only be added to this list below after official publication as the preannouncement of names is condemned. The WGSBN publishes a comprehensive guideline for the naming rules of non-cometary small Solar System bodies.

== 229001–229100 ==
Named minor planet	Provisional	This minor planet was named for...	Ref · Catalog
229004 Josephhall	2003 WL_{178}	William Joseph Hall, American administrator in a lead role supporting the travel department of the Southwest Research Institute.	IAU · 229004

== 229101–229200 ==
back to top

Named minor planet	Provisional	This minor planet was named for...	Ref · Catalog
There are no named minor planets in this number range

== 229201–229300 ==
back to top

Named minor planet	Provisional	This minor planet was named for...	Ref · Catalog
229214 Magdasaina	2004 VG_{67}	Magda M. Saina (born 1954), American multidisciplinary expert in graphics design and production.	JPL · 229214
229255 Andrewelliott	2005 AJ	Andrew John Elliott (1946–2010), a British observer who pioneered the use of low-light devices, precision timing and video methods in observing short-lived phenomena.	JPL · 229255
229280 Sica	2005 BN_{47}	Robert Joseph Sica (born 1956) is an American-Canadian atmospheric physicist. He was Chair of the Department of Physics and Astronomy at the University of Western Ontario in London, Canada from 2015 to 2022.	IAU · 229280

== 229301–229400 ==
back to top

Named minor planet	Provisional	This minor planet was named for...	Ref · Catalog
There are no named minor planets in this number range

== 229401–229500 ==
back to top

Named minor planet	Provisional	This minor planet was named for...	Ref · Catalog
229425 Grosspointner	2005 TW_{50}	Peter Grosspointner (born 1960), a well-known Austrian amateur astronomer and treasurer of the Astronomischer Arbeitskreis Salzkammergut, one of Austria's largest astronomical societies.	JPL · 229425
229440 Filimon	2005 UE_{6}	Erwin Filimon (born 1959), a well-known Austrian amateur astronomer and long-term Chairman of the Astronomischer Arbeitskreis Salzkammergut, one of Austria's largest astronomical societies.	JPL · 229440

== 229501–229600 ==
back to top

Named minor planet	Provisional	This minor planet was named for...	Ref · Catalog
There are no named minor planets in this number range

== 229601–229700 ==
back to top

Named minor planet	Provisional	This minor planet was named for...	Ref · Catalog
229614 Womack	2006 DF_{59}	Maria P. Womack (born 1963) is an American astronomer at the University of Central Florida. She has made important spectroscopic contributions to understanding the chemical composition and onset of cometary activity.	JPL · 229614
229631 Cluny	2006 ER	The city of Cluny is in the Saône-et-Loire department (Burgundy, France), 20 km north west of Mâcon.	JPL · 229631

== 229701–229800 ==
back to top

Named minor planet	Provisional	This minor planet was named for...	Ref · Catalog
229723 Marcoludwig	2007 GG_{2}	Marco Ludwig (born 1982), a German amateur astronomer and head of the Volkshochschule Observatory in Neumünster	IAU · 229723
229737 Porthos	2007 HO_{4}	Porthos, a fictional character in Dumas' novels The Three Musketeers, Twenty Years After and The Vicomte de Bragelonne. (Also see 227930 Athos and 227962 Aramis.)	JPL · 229737
229762 Gǃkúnǁʼhòmdímà	2007 UK_{126}	Gǃkúnǁʼhòmdímà is the beautiful aardvark girl of Juǀʼhoan mythology who sometimes appears in stories as a python and sometimes as an elephant. She defends her people and punishes wrongdoers using gǁámígǁàmì spines, a raincloud full of hail, and her magical oryx horn Gǃòʼé ǃHú. The satellite is being named Gǃòʼé ǃHú.	JPL · 229762
229777 ENIAC	2008 MX_{4}	ENIAC or Electronic Numerical Integrator and Computer, the first general-purpose electronic computer, a Turing-complete, digital computer capable of being reprogrammed to solve a full range of computing problems.	JPL · 229777
229781 Arthurmcdonald	2008 PS_{1}	Arthur B. McDonald (born 1943) is a Canadian physicist who received the 2015 Nobel Prize for Physics for his discovery of neutrino oscillations, showing that the neutrino has mass.	MPC · 229781

== 229801–229900 ==
back to top

Named minor planet	Provisional	This minor planet was named for...	Ref · Catalog
229836 Wladimarinello	2009 QR_{34}	Wladimiro Marinello, Italian amateur astronomer and discoverer of minor planets	JPL · 229836
229864 Sichouzhilu	2009 TC_{26}	Sichouzhilu (Silk Road) was an ancient network of trade and cultural transmission routes that connected Chang'an, China to the Mediterranean Sea. The Chang'an-Tianshan corridor was listed as a World Heritage Site by UNESCO in 2014.	JPL · 229864
229900 Emmagreaves	2009 VO_{42}	Emma Jane Greaves (born 1976), daughter of British discoverer Norman Falla	JPL · 229900

== 229901–230000 ==
back to top

Named minor planet	Provisional	This minor planet was named for...	Ref · Catalog
There are no named minor planets in this number range

back to top

Preceded by 228,001–229,000	Meanings of minor-planet names List of minor planets: 229,001–230,000	Succeeded by 230,001–231,000
