= List of minor planets: 229001–230000 =

The following is a partial list of minor planets, running from minor-planet number 229001 through 230000, inclusive. The primary data for this and other partial lists is based on JPL's "Small-Body Orbital Elements" and data available from the Minor Planet Center. Critical list information is also provided by the MPC, unless otherwise specified from Lowell Observatory. A detailed description of the table's columns and additional sources are given on the main page including a complete list of every page in this series, and a statistical break-up on the dynamical classification of minor planets.

Also see the summary list of all named bodies in numerical and alphabetical order, and the corresponding naming citations for the number range of this particular list. New namings may only be added to this list after official publication, as the preannouncement of names is condemned by the Working Group for Small Bodies Nomenclature of the International Astronomical Union.

Near-Earth obj.	MBA (inner)	MBA (outer)	Centaur
Mars-crosser	MBA (middle)	Jupiter trojan	Trans-Neptunian obj.
Unclassified

== 229001–229100 ==
Designation			Discovery			Properties		Ref
Permanent	Provisional	Named after	Date	Site	Discoverer(s)	Category	Diam.	Ref
229001	2003 WL_{155}	—	November 26, 2003	Kitt Peak	Spacewatch	·	4.3 km	MPC; JPL
229002	2003 WN_{169}	—	November 19, 2003	Palomar	NEAT	·	6.0 km	MPC; JPL
229003	2003 WZ_{170}	—	November 21, 2003	Palomar	NEAT	·	6.6 km	MPC; JPL
229004 Josephhall	2003 WL_{178}	Josephhall	November 20, 2003	Kitt Peak	M. W. Buie	·	3.2 km	MPC; JPL
229005	2003 WX_{188}	—	November 19, 2003	Palomar	NEAT	·	7.4 km	MPC; JPL
229006	2003 WT_{192}	—	November 18, 2003	Palomar	NEAT	·	4.4 km	MPC; JPL
229007	2003 XF_{11}	—	December 13, 2003	Socorro	LINEAR	APO +1km	1.4 km	MPC; JPL
229008	2003 XT_{11}	—	December 12, 2003	Palomar	NEAT	·	4.8 km	MPC; JPL
229009	2003 XJ_{22}	—	December 4, 2003	Socorro	LINEAR	·	5.8 km	MPC; JPL
229010	2003 XJ_{26}	—	December 1, 2003	Socorro	LINEAR	·	4.4 km	MPC; JPL
229011	2003 YF	—	December 16, 2003	Socorro	LINEAR	H	1.1 km	MPC; JPL
229012	2003 YD_{14}	—	December 17, 2003	Socorro	LINEAR	·	5.0 km	MPC; JPL
229013	2003 YR_{23}	—	December 17, 2003	Socorro	LINEAR	·	4.3 km	MPC; JPL
229014	2003 YN_{27}	—	December 17, 2003	Kitt Peak	Spacewatch	·	6.3 km	MPC; JPL
229015	2003 YV_{45}	—	December 17, 2003	Socorro	LINEAR	·	5.3 km	MPC; JPL
229016	2003 YW_{49}	—	December 18, 2003	Socorro	LINEAR	·	4.7 km	MPC; JPL
229017	2003 YS_{61}	—	December 19, 2003	Socorro	LINEAR	HYG	5.0 km	MPC; JPL
229018	2003 YT_{61}	—	December 19, 2003	Socorro	LINEAR	·	7.3 km	MPC; JPL
229019	2003 YD_{65}	—	December 19, 2003	Socorro	LINEAR	TIR	3.4 km	MPC; JPL
229020	2003 YU_{68}	—	December 19, 2003	Socorro	LINEAR	·	1.3 km	MPC; JPL
229021	2003 YG_{92}	—	December 21, 2003	Catalina	CSS	·	6.2 km	MPC; JPL
229022	2003 YO_{100}	—	December 19, 2003	Socorro	LINEAR	·	6.5 km	MPC; JPL
229023	2003 YT_{160}	—	December 17, 2003	Kitt Peak	Spacewatch	·	5.1 km	MPC; JPL
229024	2003 YT_{164}	—	December 17, 2003	Kitt Peak	Spacewatch	·	4.7 km	MPC; JPL
229025	2004 BJ_{13}	—	January 17, 2004	Palomar	NEAT	·	910 m	MPC; JPL
229026	2004 BS_{32}	—	January 19, 2004	Kitt Peak	Spacewatch	·	720 m	MPC; JPL
229027	2004 BK_{46}	—	January 21, 2004	Socorro	LINEAR	·	6.0 km	MPC; JPL
229028	2004 CZ_{3}	—	February 10, 2004	Palomar	NEAT	·	1.2 km	MPC; JPL
229029	2004 CS_{45}	—	February 13, 2004	Kitt Peak	Spacewatch	BAP	1.7 km	MPC; JPL
229030	2004 CQ_{58}	—	February 10, 2004	Palomar	NEAT	·	5.6 km	MPC; JPL
229031	2004 DE_{33}	—	February 18, 2004	Socorro	LINEAR	·	1.8 km	MPC; JPL
229032	2004 DN_{34}	—	February 18, 2004	Kvistaberg	Uppsala-DLR Asteroid Survey	·	4.0 km	MPC; JPL
229033	2004 DF_{46}	—	February 19, 2004	Socorro	LINEAR	·	1.3 km	MPC; JPL
229034	2004 DP_{70}	—	February 26, 2004	Socorro	LINEAR	·	900 m	MPC; JPL
229035	2004 EJ_{3}	—	March 10, 2004	Palomar	NEAT	·	5.9 km	MPC; JPL
229036	2004 EX_{55}	—	March 14, 2004	Palomar	NEAT	·	980 m	MPC; JPL
229037	2004 EE_{62}	—	March 12, 2004	Palomar	NEAT	·	2.2 km	MPC; JPL
229038	2004 EG_{63}	—	March 13, 2004	Palomar	NEAT	·	1.1 km	MPC; JPL
229039	2004 EN_{73}	—	March 15, 2004	Catalina	CSS	·	1 km	MPC; JPL
229040	2004 EC_{77}	—	March 15, 2004	Catalina	CSS	·	1.0 km	MPC; JPL
229041	2004 EJ_{94}	—	March 15, 2004	Kitt Peak	Spacewatch	·	1.0 km	MPC; JPL
229042	2004 EQ_{98}	—	March 15, 2004	Kitt Peak	Spacewatch	·	2.9 km	MPC; JPL
229043	2004 EG_{102}	—	March 15, 2004	Kitt Peak	Spacewatch	·	800 m	MPC; JPL
229044	2004 FX_{8}	—	March 16, 2004	Socorro	LINEAR	·	1.6 km	MPC; JPL
229045	2004 FM_{11}	—	March 16, 2004	Catalina	CSS	·	1.1 km	MPC; JPL
229046	2004 FB_{23}	—	March 17, 2004	Kitt Peak	Spacewatch	V	890 m	MPC; JPL
229047	2004 FP_{28}	—	March 18, 2004	Kitt Peak	Spacewatch	MAS	960 m	MPC; JPL
229048	2004 FE_{34}	—	March 16, 2004	Socorro	LINEAR	·	1.0 km	MPC; JPL
229049	2004 FH_{36}	—	March 16, 2004	Socorro	LINEAR	·	980 m	MPC; JPL
229050	2004 FK_{57}	—	March 17, 2004	Kitt Peak	Spacewatch	HIL · 3:2	7.8 km	MPC; JPL
229051	2004 FR_{60}	—	March 18, 2004	Kitt Peak	Spacewatch	·	980 m	MPC; JPL
229052	2004 FH_{64}	—	March 19, 2004	Socorro	LINEAR	·	1.1 km	MPC; JPL
229053	2004 FS_{67}	—	March 20, 2004	Socorro	LINEAR	·	1.9 km	MPC; JPL
229054	2004 FT_{85}	—	March 19, 2004	Palomar	NEAT	·	990 m	MPC; JPL
229055	2004 FD_{112}	—	March 26, 2004	Kitt Peak	Spacewatch	·	900 m	MPC; JPL
229056	2004 FC_{126}	—	March 27, 2004	Socorro	LINEAR	·	870 m	MPC; JPL
229057	2004 FB_{137}	—	March 28, 2004	Socorro	LINEAR	·	1.7 km	MPC; JPL
229058	2004 FR_{142}	—	March 27, 2004	Socorro	LINEAR	·	960 m	MPC; JPL
229059	2004 FA_{165}	—	March 20, 2004	Kitt Peak	Spacewatch	·	680 m	MPC; JPL
229060	2004 GM_{4}	—	April 11, 2004	Palomar	NEAT	·	810 m	MPC; JPL
229061	2004 GJ_{12}	—	April 9, 2004	Siding Spring	SSS	(2076)	1.3 km	MPC; JPL
229062	2004 GB_{24}	—	April 13, 2004	Catalina	CSS	·	1.4 km	MPC; JPL
229063	2004 GP_{31}	—	April 15, 2004	Anderson Mesa	LONEOS	NYS	1.4 km	MPC; JPL
229064	2004 GJ_{33}	—	April 12, 2004	Palomar	NEAT	(2076)	1.2 km	MPC; JPL
229065	2004 GK_{46}	—	April 12, 2004	Kitt Peak	Spacewatch	·	1.2 km	MPC; JPL
229066	2004 GM_{46}	—	April 12, 2004	Kitt Peak	Spacewatch	·	1.5 km	MPC; JPL
229067	2004 GZ_{59}	—	April 13, 2004	Kitt Peak	Spacewatch	·	960 m	MPC; JPL
229068	2004 GD_{71}	—	April 13, 2004	Kitt Peak	Spacewatch	·	1.3 km	MPC; JPL
229069	2004 GK_{79}	—	April 12, 2004	Kitt Peak	Spacewatch	·	950 m	MPC; JPL
229070	2004 HJ_{8}	—	April 16, 2004	Socorro	LINEAR	·	1.0 km	MPC; JPL
229071	2004 HS_{34}	—	April 17, 2004	Anderson Mesa	LONEOS	V	1.1 km	MPC; JPL
229072	2004 HO_{36}	—	April 21, 2004	Campo Imperatore	CINEOS	·	1.2 km	MPC; JPL
229073	2004 HO_{57}	—	April 21, 2004	Kitt Peak	Spacewatch	·	940 m	MPC; JPL
229074	2004 JL_{6}	—	May 9, 2004	Palomar	NEAT	ERI	2.0 km	MPC; JPL
229075	2004 JX_{18}	—	May 13, 2004	Kitt Peak	Spacewatch	·	1.2 km	MPC; JPL
229076	2004 JO_{50}	—	May 14, 2004	Kitt Peak	Spacewatch	V	990 m	MPC; JPL
229077	2004 LA_{13}	—	June 9, 2004	Anderson Mesa	LONEOS	·	1.2 km	MPC; JPL
229078	2004 LY_{15}	—	June 12, 2004	Socorro	LINEAR	·	2.7 km	MPC; JPL
229079	2004 LH_{17}	—	June 14, 2004	Socorro	LINEAR	·	1.7 km	MPC; JPL
229080	2004 LS_{19}	—	June 11, 2004	Kitt Peak	Spacewatch	·	1.9 km	MPC; JPL
229081	2004 MV_{5}	—	June 20, 2004	Kitt Peak	Spacewatch	(2076)	1.3 km	MPC; JPL
229082	2004 NR_{6}	—	July 11, 2004	Socorro	LINEAR	·	3.3 km	MPC; JPL
229083	2004 NE_{11}	—	July 10, 2004	Palomar	NEAT	·	2.7 km	MPC; JPL
229084	2004 NL_{11}	—	July 11, 2004	Socorro	LINEAR	KON	3.8 km	MPC; JPL
229085	2004 NC_{13}	—	July 11, 2004	Socorro	LINEAR	·	1.1 km	MPC; JPL
229086	2004 NG_{14}	—	July 11, 2004	Socorro	LINEAR	·	1.3 km	MPC; JPL
229087	2004 NS_{16}	—	July 11, 2004	Socorro	LINEAR	·	1.6 km	MPC; JPL
229088	2004 NM_{31}	—	July 11, 2004	Anderson Mesa	LONEOS	·	2.9 km	MPC; JPL
229089	2004 OG_{8}	—	July 16, 2004	Socorro	LINEAR	·	2.5 km	MPC; JPL
229090	2004 PQ_{10}	—	August 7, 2004	Palomar	NEAT	·	1.5 km	MPC; JPL
229091	2004 PV_{36}	—	August 9, 2004	Socorro	LINEAR	V	1.1 km	MPC; JPL
229092	2004 PL_{95}	—	August 13, 2004	Palomar	NEAT	·	2.0 km	MPC; JPL
229093	2004 PV_{112}	—	August 8, 2004	Palomar	NEAT	·	2.3 km	MPC; JPL
229094	2004 QT_{4}	—	August 19, 2004	Siding Spring	SSS	·	2.2 km	MPC; JPL
229095	2004 QC_{7}	—	August 22, 2004	Reedy Creek	J. Broughton	·	2.6 km	MPC; JPL
229096	2004 QQ_{7}	—	August 22, 2004	Bergisch Gladbach	W. Bickel	·	3.2 km	MPC; JPL
229097	2004 QC_{9}	—	August 20, 2004	Catalina	CSS	·	5.1 km	MPC; JPL
229098	2004 QO_{18}	—	August 20, 2004	Siding Spring	SSS	JUN	1.3 km	MPC; JPL
229099	2004 RM_{13}	—	September 6, 2004	Needville	Needville	NEM	2.5 km	MPC; JPL
229100	2004 RC_{26}	—	September 4, 2004	Palomar	NEAT	·	2.8 km	MPC; JPL

== 229101–229200 ==
back to top

Designation			Discovery			Properties		Ref
Permanent	Provisional	Named after	Date	Site	Discoverer(s)	Category	Diam.	Ref
229101	2004 RU_{28}	—	September 6, 2004	Siding Spring	SSS	·	2.3 km	MPC; JPL
229102	2004 RV_{31}	—	September 7, 2004	Socorro	LINEAR	·	1.9 km	MPC; JPL
229103	2004 RC_{32}	—	September 7, 2004	Socorro	LINEAR	·	2.5 km	MPC; JPL
229104	2004 RW_{33}	—	September 7, 2004	Socorro	LINEAR	(5)	1.7 km	MPC; JPL
229105	2004 RP_{39}	—	September 7, 2004	Kitt Peak	Spacewatch	·	2.3 km	MPC; JPL
229106	2004 RJ_{40}	—	September 7, 2004	Kitt Peak	Spacewatch	RAF	1.2 km	MPC; JPL
229107	2004 RZ_{49}	—	September 8, 2004	Socorro	LINEAR	AEO	1.5 km	MPC; JPL
229108	2004 RA_{51}	—	September 8, 2004	Socorro	LINEAR	·	2.1 km	MPC; JPL
229109	2004 RQ_{56}	—	September 8, 2004	Socorro	LINEAR	·	1.5 km	MPC; JPL
229110	2004 RG_{64}	—	September 8, 2004	Socorro	LINEAR	AEO	1.5 km	MPC; JPL
229111	2004 RR_{74}	—	September 8, 2004	Socorro	LINEAR	·	2.1 km	MPC; JPL
229112	2004 RV_{75}	—	September 8, 2004	Socorro	LINEAR	·	2.4 km	MPC; JPL
229113	2004 RN_{82}	—	September 9, 2004	Socorro	LINEAR	·	1.5 km	MPC; JPL
229114	2004 RE_{89}	—	September 8, 2004	Socorro	LINEAR	·	3.0 km	MPC; JPL
229115	2004 RZ_{96}	—	September 8, 2004	Palomar	NEAT	·	2.9 km	MPC; JPL
229116	2004 RK_{99}	—	September 8, 2004	Socorro	LINEAR	·	1.8 km	MPC; JPL
229117	2004 RH_{102}	—	September 8, 2004	Socorro	LINEAR	·	1.8 km	MPC; JPL
229118	2004 RJ_{105}	—	September 8, 2004	Palomar	NEAT	GEF	1.6 km	MPC; JPL
229119	2004 RR_{108}	—	September 9, 2004	Kitt Peak	Spacewatch	·	1.8 km	MPC; JPL
229120	2004 RE_{121}	—	September 7, 2004	Kitt Peak	Spacewatch	·	1.7 km	MPC; JPL
229121	2004 RQ_{136}	—	September 7, 2004	Palomar	NEAT	·	5.1 km	MPC; JPL
229122	2004 RM_{138}	—	September 8, 2004	Palomar	NEAT	MAR	2.7 km	MPC; JPL
229123	2004 RC_{139}	—	September 8, 2004	Palomar	NEAT	·	3.0 km	MPC; JPL
229124	2004 RV_{157}	—	September 10, 2004	Socorro	LINEAR	·	2.0 km	MPC; JPL
229125	2004 RE_{162}	—	September 11, 2004	Socorro	LINEAR	·	1.5 km	MPC; JPL
229126	2004 RP_{176}	—	September 10, 2004	Socorro	LINEAR	·	2.7 km	MPC; JPL
229127	2004 RD_{178}	—	September 10, 2004	Socorro	LINEAR	·	3.4 km	MPC; JPL
229128	2004 RG_{178}	—	September 10, 2004	Socorro	LINEAR	·	2.7 km	MPC; JPL
229129	2004 RV_{187}	—	September 10, 2004	Socorro	LINEAR	·	1.8 km	MPC; JPL
229130	2004 RR_{191}	—	September 10, 2004	Socorro	LINEAR	DOR	5.7 km	MPC; JPL
229131	2004 RC_{206}	—	September 10, 2004	Socorro	LINEAR	·	2.6 km	MPC; JPL
229132	2004 RH_{218}	—	September 11, 2004	Socorro	LINEAR	ADE	3.1 km	MPC; JPL
229133	2004 RQ_{218}	—	September 11, 2004	Socorro	LINEAR	·	2.2 km	MPC; JPL
229134	2004 RU_{218}	—	September 11, 2004	Socorro	LINEAR	·	2.8 km	MPC; JPL
229135	2004 RO_{219}	—	September 11, 2004	Socorro	LINEAR	·	3.7 km	MPC; JPL
229136	2004 RM_{227}	—	September 9, 2004	Kitt Peak	Spacewatch	·	2.0 km	MPC; JPL
229137	2004 RK_{269}	—	September 11, 2004	Kitt Peak	Spacewatch	·	1.5 km	MPC; JPL
229138	2004 RF_{289}	—	September 15, 2004	Socorro	LINEAR	HNS	2.4 km	MPC; JPL
229139	2004 RF_{292}	—	September 10, 2004	Socorro	LINEAR	·	2.8 km	MPC; JPL
229140	2004 RQ_{292}	—	September 10, 2004	Socorro	LINEAR	·	2.6 km	MPC; JPL
229141	2004 RD_{299}	—	September 11, 2004	Kitt Peak	Spacewatch	·	1.5 km	MPC; JPL
229142	2004 RH_{311}	—	September 13, 2004	Palomar	NEAT	·	3.5 km	MPC; JPL
229143	2004 RO_{315}	—	September 15, 2004	Siding Spring	SSS	·	3.4 km	MPC; JPL
229144	2004 RF_{318}	—	September 12, 2004	Socorro	LINEAR	·	3.6 km	MPC; JPL
229145	2004 RD_{326}	—	September 13, 2004	Socorro	LINEAR	·	4.0 km	MPC; JPL
229146	2004 SV_{1}	—	September 16, 2004	Socorro	LINEAR	·	2.7 km	MPC; JPL
229147	2004 SD_{13}	—	September 17, 2004	Socorro	LINEAR	·	2.5 km	MPC; JPL
229148	2004 SP_{17}	—	September 17, 2004	Anderson Mesa	LONEOS	·	1.9 km	MPC; JPL
229149	2004 SN_{23}	—	September 17, 2004	Kitt Peak	Spacewatch	·	2.1 km	MPC; JPL
229150	2004 ST_{31}	—	September 17, 2004	Socorro	LINEAR	AGN	1.3 km	MPC; JPL
229151	2004 SY_{37}	—	September 17, 2004	Socorro	LINEAR	·	3.0 km	MPC; JPL
229152	2004 SY_{40}	—	September 17, 2004	Anderson Mesa	LONEOS	EOS	2.5 km	MPC; JPL
229153	2004 SZ_{43}	—	September 18, 2004	Socorro	LINEAR	MRX	1.7 km	MPC; JPL
229154	2004 SG_{49}	—	September 21, 2004	Socorro	LINEAR	·	3.0 km	MPC; JPL
229155	2004 SP_{54}	—	September 22, 2004	Socorro	LINEAR	MRX	1.7 km	MPC; JPL
229156	2004 TU	—	October 4, 2004	Anderson Mesa	LONEOS	AGN	1.8 km	MPC; JPL
229157	2004 TC_{2}	—	October 4, 2004	Kitt Peak	Spacewatch	·	2.9 km	MPC; JPL
229158	2004 TF_{4}	—	October 4, 2004	Kitt Peak	Spacewatch	·	3.4 km	MPC; JPL
229159	2004 TW_{14}	—	October 10, 2004	Socorro	LINEAR	·	4.2 km	MPC; JPL
229160	2004 TW_{42}	—	October 4, 2004	Kitt Peak	Spacewatch	·	1.6 km	MPC; JPL
229161	2004 TL_{52}	—	October 4, 2004	Kitt Peak	Spacewatch	·	3.1 km	MPC; JPL
229162	2004 TU_{65}	—	October 5, 2004	Anderson Mesa	LONEOS	·	2.8 km	MPC; JPL
229163	2004 TC_{67}	—	October 5, 2004	Anderson Mesa	LONEOS	·	4.5 km	MPC; JPL
229164	2004 TA_{75}	—	October 6, 2004	Kitt Peak	Spacewatch	·	2.9 km	MPC; JPL
229165	2004 TK_{75}	—	October 6, 2004	Kitt Peak	Spacewatch	·	2.3 km	MPC; JPL
229166	2004 TP_{96}	—	October 5, 2004	Kitt Peak	Spacewatch	AST	3.1 km	MPC; JPL
229167	2004 TM_{97}	—	October 5, 2004	Kitt Peak	Spacewatch	·	2.2 km	MPC; JPL
229168	2004 TP_{129}	—	October 7, 2004	Socorro	LINEAR	AEO	2.1 km	MPC; JPL
229169	2004 TQ_{130}	—	October 7, 2004	Socorro	LINEAR	·	3.6 km	MPC; JPL
229170	2004 TR_{136}	—	October 8, 2004	Anderson Mesa	LONEOS	·	3.7 km	MPC; JPL
229171	2004 TW_{136}	—	October 8, 2004	Anderson Mesa	LONEOS	·	3.6 km	MPC; JPL
229172	2004 TR_{138}	—	October 9, 2004	Anderson Mesa	LONEOS	·	2.9 km	MPC; JPL
229173	2004 TU_{145}	—	October 5, 2004	Kitt Peak	Spacewatch	AEO	2.0 km	MPC; JPL
229174	2004 TA_{151}	—	October 6, 2004	Kitt Peak	Spacewatch	·	2.2 km	MPC; JPL
229175	2004 TV_{157}	—	October 6, 2004	Kitt Peak	Spacewatch	HOF	3.0 km	MPC; JPL
229176	2004 TW_{157}	—	October 6, 2004	Kitt Peak	Spacewatch	MRX	1.6 km	MPC; JPL
229177	2004 TF_{158}	—	October 6, 2004	Kitt Peak	Spacewatch	AGN	1.4 km	MPC; JPL
229178	2004 TD_{160}	—	October 6, 2004	Kitt Peak	Spacewatch	HOF	3.9 km	MPC; JPL
229179	2004 TD_{166}	—	October 7, 2004	Kitt Peak	Spacewatch	·	3.1 km	MPC; JPL
229180	2004 TU_{177}	—	October 7, 2004	Kitt Peak	Spacewatch	·	1.7 km	MPC; JPL
229181	2004 TX_{178}	—	October 7, 2004	Kitt Peak	Spacewatch	·	1.9 km	MPC; JPL
229182	2004 TK_{187}	—	October 7, 2004	Kitt Peak	Spacewatch	(13314)	3.6 km	MPC; JPL
229183	2004 TH_{188}	—	October 7, 2004	Kitt Peak	Spacewatch	·	3.2 km	MPC; JPL
229184	2004 TV_{196}	—	October 7, 2004	Kitt Peak	Spacewatch	HOF	3.2 km	MPC; JPL
229185	2004 TH_{210}	—	October 8, 2004	Kitt Peak	Spacewatch	·	2.9 km	MPC; JPL
229186	2004 TO_{219}	—	October 5, 2004	Kitt Peak	Spacewatch	·	2.5 km	MPC; JPL
229187	2004 TP_{219}	—	October 5, 2004	Kitt Peak	Spacewatch	·	1.8 km	MPC; JPL
229188	2004 TF_{221}	—	October 7, 2004	Socorro	LINEAR	·	1.6 km	MPC; JPL
229189	2004 TH_{222}	—	October 7, 2004	Socorro	LINEAR	·	3.5 km	MPC; JPL
229190	2004 TN_{225}	—	October 8, 2004	Kitt Peak	Spacewatch	·	1.6 km	MPC; JPL
229191	2004 TD_{241}	—	October 10, 2004	Socorro	LINEAR	·	3.8 km	MPC; JPL
229192	2004 TN_{256}	—	October 9, 2004	Kitt Peak	Spacewatch	AGN	1.6 km	MPC; JPL
229193	2004 TE_{276}	—	October 9, 2004	Kitt Peak	Spacewatch	·	2.1 km	MPC; JPL
229194	2004 TD_{281}	—	October 10, 2004	Kitt Peak	Spacewatch	·	3.3 km	MPC; JPL
229195	2004 TV_{285}	—	October 8, 2004	Anderson Mesa	LONEOS	DOR	4.4 km	MPC; JPL
229196	2004 TN_{303}	—	October 10, 2004	Kitt Peak	Spacewatch	·	2.2 km	MPC; JPL
229197	2004 TV_{346}	—	October 15, 2004	Anderson Mesa	LONEOS	·	4.3 km	MPC; JPL
229198 Zofiahuppenthal	2004 TS_{357}	Zofiahuppenthal	October 15, 2004	Moletai	K. Černis	·	2.9 km	MPC; JPL
229199	2004 TB_{368}	—	October 7, 2004	Kitt Peak	Spacewatch	·	1.2 km	MPC; JPL
229200	2004 UT_{7}	—	October 21, 2004	Socorro	LINEAR	·	2.9 km	MPC; JPL

== 229201–229300 ==
back to top

Designation			Discovery			Properties		Ref
Permanent	Provisional	Named after	Date	Site	Discoverer(s)	Category	Diam.	Ref
229201	2004 UA_{10}	—	October 21, 2004	Socorro	LINEAR	H	780 m	MPC; JPL
229202	2004 VR_{6}	—	November 3, 2004	Kitt Peak	Spacewatch	·	4.3 km	MPC; JPL
229203	2004 VA_{8}	—	November 3, 2004	Kitt Peak	Spacewatch	·	2.4 km	MPC; JPL
229204	2004 VJ_{14}	—	November 4, 2004	Catalina	CSS	·	3.4 km	MPC; JPL
229205	2004 VN_{24}	—	November 3, 2004	Anderson Mesa	LONEOS	·	3.2 km	MPC; JPL
229206	2004 VE_{25}	—	November 4, 2004	Anderson Mesa	LONEOS	·	3.0 km	MPC; JPL
229207	2004 VW_{29}	—	November 3, 2004	Kitt Peak	Spacewatch	·	2.7 km	MPC; JPL
229208	2004 VA_{35}	—	November 3, 2004	Kitt Peak	Spacewatch	KOR	1.6 km	MPC; JPL
229209	2004 VL_{48}	—	November 4, 2004	Kitt Peak	Spacewatch	·	2.9 km	MPC; JPL
229210	2004 VJ_{52}	—	November 4, 2004	Catalina	CSS	·	4.1 km	MPC; JPL
229211	2004 VS_{54}	—	November 5, 2004	Socorro	LINEAR	·	4.1 km	MPC; JPL
229212	2004 VJ_{59}	—	November 9, 2004	Catalina	CSS	·	4.5 km	MPC; JPL
229213	2004 VF_{65}	—	November 10, 2004	Kitt Peak	Spacewatch	·	2.8 km	MPC; JPL
229214 Magdasaina	2004 VG_{67}	Magdasaina	November 9, 2004	Kitt Peak	M. W. Buie	KOR	1.5 km	MPC; JPL
229215	2004 VN_{69}	—	November 10, 2004	Kitt Peak	Spacewatch	EOS	2.6 km	MPC; JPL
229216	2004 VK_{72}	—	November 4, 2004	Catalina	CSS	·	3.9 km	MPC; JPL
229217	2004 VN_{73}	—	November 6, 2004	Socorro	LINEAR	·	2.5 km	MPC; JPL
229218	2004 VW_{77}	—	November 12, 2004	Catalina	CSS	·	2.9 km	MPC; JPL
229219	2004 VW_{83}	—	November 10, 2004	Kitt Peak	Spacewatch	·	2.1 km	MPC; JPL
229220	2004 VA_{84}	—	November 10, 2004	Kitt Peak	Spacewatch	KOR	1.6 km	MPC; JPL
229221	2004 WW_{2}	—	November 17, 2004	Siding Spring	SSS	·	2.3 km	MPC; JPL
229222	2004 XX_{3}	—	December 2, 2004	Palomar	NEAT	HOF	4.0 km	MPC; JPL
229223	2004 XB_{5}	—	December 2, 2004	Catalina	CSS	·	4.0 km	MPC; JPL
229224	2004 XD_{9}	—	December 2, 2004	Catalina	CSS	·	4.9 km	MPC; JPL
229225	2004 XU_{16}	—	December 10, 2004	Desert Moon	Stevens, B. L.	·	2.4 km	MPC; JPL
229226	2004 XT_{17}	—	December 7, 2004	Socorro	LINEAR	WIT	1.6 km	MPC; JPL
229227	2004 XE_{18}	—	December 8, 2004	Socorro	LINEAR	·	2.9 km	MPC; JPL
229228	2004 XC_{27}	—	December 10, 2004	Socorro	LINEAR	·	3.2 km	MPC; JPL
229229	2004 XT_{32}	—	December 10, 2004	Socorro	LINEAR	·	3.2 km	MPC; JPL
229230	2004 XU_{36}	—	December 11, 2004	Campo Imperatore	CINEOS	·	2.4 km	MPC; JPL
229231	2004 XS_{40}	—	December 11, 2004	Socorro	LINEAR	·	3.3 km	MPC; JPL
229232	2004 XV_{60}	—	December 12, 2004	Kitt Peak	Spacewatch	·	2.2 km	MPC; JPL
229233	2004 XV_{64}	—	December 2, 2004	Socorro	LINEAR	·	3.5 km	MPC; JPL
229234	2004 XN_{65}	—	December 2, 2004	Palomar	NEAT	·	2.4 km	MPC; JPL
229235	2004 XU_{68}	—	December 8, 2004	Socorro	LINEAR	·	3.3 km	MPC; JPL
229236	2004 XM_{76}	—	December 10, 2004	Kitt Peak	Spacewatch	BRA	2.3 km	MPC; JPL
229237	2004 XG_{79}	—	December 10, 2004	Socorro	LINEAR	·	2.6 km	MPC; JPL
229238	2004 XY_{80}	—	December 10, 2004	Socorro	LINEAR	·	4.6 km	MPC; JPL
229239	2004 XY_{84}	—	December 12, 2004	Kitt Peak	Spacewatch	·	2.9 km	MPC; JPL
229240	2004 XB_{98}	—	December 11, 2004	Kitt Peak	Spacewatch	·	2.7 km	MPC; JPL
229241	2004 XF_{114}	—	December 10, 2004	Kitt Peak	Spacewatch	·	2.3 km	MPC; JPL
229242	2004 XV_{119}	—	December 12, 2004	Kitt Peak	Spacewatch	·	2.3 km	MPC; JPL
229243	2004 XJ_{122}	—	December 9, 2004	Catalina	CSS	·	2.8 km	MPC; JPL
229244	2004 XA_{123}	—	December 10, 2004	Kitt Peak	Spacewatch	·	6.3 km	MPC; JPL
229245	2004 XK_{123}	—	December 10, 2004	Socorro	LINEAR	·	5.4 km	MPC; JPL
229246	2004 XQ_{126}	—	December 13, 2004	Kitt Peak	Spacewatch	·	4.2 km	MPC; JPL
229247	2004 XX_{131}	—	December 11, 2004	Socorro	LINEAR	·	3.3 km	MPC; JPL
229248	2004 XU_{135}	—	December 15, 2004	Socorro	LINEAR	·	4.2 km	MPC; JPL
229249	2004 XE_{157}	—	December 14, 2004	Kitt Peak	Spacewatch	EOS	3.0 km	MPC; JPL
229250	2004 XP_{170}	—	December 9, 2004	Catalina	CSS	·	3.5 km	MPC; JPL
229251	2004 XQ_{182}	—	December 2, 2004	Catalina	CSS	·	3.2 km	MPC; JPL
229252	2004 YW_{3}	—	December 16, 2004	Kitt Peak	Spacewatch	·	6.7 km	MPC; JPL
229253	2004 YK_{4}	—	December 16, 2004	Haleakala	NEAT	·	4.7 km	MPC; JPL
229254	2004 YL_{14}	—	December 18, 2004	Mount Lemmon	Mount Lemmon Survey	·	2.8 km	MPC; JPL
229255 Andrewelliott	2005 AJ	Andrewelliott	January 4, 2005	Great Shefford	Birtwhistle, P.	KOR	1.6 km	MPC; JPL
229256	2005 AW_{2}	—	January 6, 2005	Catalina	CSS	·	3.7 km	MPC; JPL
229257	2005 AF_{13}	—	January 7, 2005	Modra	Gajdoš, S., Világi, J.	·	3.1 km	MPC; JPL
229258	2005 AR_{13}	—	January 7, 2005	Socorro	LINEAR	·	5.3 km	MPC; JPL
229259	2005 AA_{14}	—	January 7, 2005	Socorro	LINEAR	(18466)	3.6 km	MPC; JPL
229260	2005 AJ_{17}	—	January 6, 2005	Socorro	LINEAR	·	5.2 km	MPC; JPL
229261	2005 AW_{19}	—	January 6, 2005	Socorro	LINEAR	·	3.3 km	MPC; JPL
229262	2005 AT_{20}	—	January 6, 2005	Socorro	LINEAR	·	3.2 km	MPC; JPL
229263	2005 AN_{21}	—	January 6, 2005	Catalina	CSS	HYG	5.6 km	MPC; JPL
229264	2005 AR_{31}	—	January 11, 2005	Socorro	LINEAR	KOR	2.1 km	MPC; JPL
229265	2005 AT_{34}	—	January 13, 2005	Kitt Peak	Spacewatch	EOS	2.8 km	MPC; JPL
229266	2005 AC_{36}	—	January 13, 2005	Socorro	LINEAR	·	5.1 km	MPC; JPL
229267	2005 AM_{38}	—	January 13, 2005	Catalina	CSS	·	2.9 km	MPC; JPL
229268	2005 AF_{50}	—	January 13, 2005	Socorro	LINEAR	EOS	3.0 km	MPC; JPL
229269	2005 AJ_{55}	—	January 15, 2005	Socorro	LINEAR	EOS ·	5.9 km	MPC; JPL
229270	2005 AZ_{60}	—	January 15, 2005	Kitt Peak	Spacewatch	EOS	5.9 km	MPC; JPL
229271	2005 AH_{68}	—	January 13, 2005	Catalina	CSS	·	5.0 km	MPC; JPL
229272	2005 AK_{68}	—	January 13, 2005	Anderson Mesa	LONEOS	·	3.9 km	MPC; JPL
229273	2005 AQ_{68}	—	January 13, 2005	Anderson Mesa	LONEOS	·	8.7 km	MPC; JPL
229274	2005 AY_{76}	—	January 15, 2005	Kitt Peak	Spacewatch	·	4.5 km	MPC; JPL
229275	2005 AG_{81}	—	January 15, 2005	Catalina	CSS	H	780 m	MPC; JPL
229276	2005 AV_{81}	—	January 15, 2005	Anderson Mesa	LONEOS	·	1.8 km	MPC; JPL
229277	2005 BD_{9}	—	January 16, 2005	Socorro	LINEAR	HYG	4.6 km	MPC; JPL
229278	2005 BN_{18}	—	January 16, 2005	Kitt Peak	Spacewatch	EOS	2.0 km	MPC; JPL
229279	2005 BL_{24}	—	January 17, 2005	Catalina	CSS	·	4.5 km	MPC; JPL
229280 Sica	2005 BN_{47}	Sica	January 16, 2005	Mauna Kea	P. A. Wiegert	·	2.1 km	MPC; JPL
229281	2005 CE_{1}	—	February 1, 2005	Palomar	NEAT	·	6.4 km	MPC; JPL
229282	2005 CT_{7}	—	February 4, 2005	Socorro	LINEAR	H	870 m	MPC; JPL
229283	2005 CX_{8}	—	February 1, 2005	Catalina	CSS	(159)	4.6 km	MPC; JPL
229284	2005 CJ_{9}	—	February 1, 2005	Catalina	CSS	·	3.0 km	MPC; JPL
229285	2005 CQ_{12}	—	February 2, 2005	Kitt Peak	Spacewatch	·	3.0 km	MPC; JPL
229286	2005 CJ_{35}	—	February 2, 2005	Kitt Peak	Spacewatch	·	5.2 km	MPC; JPL
229287	2005 CG_{36}	—	February 3, 2005	Socorro	LINEAR	·	3.3 km	MPC; JPL
229288	2005 CM_{38}	—	February 4, 2005	Socorro	LINEAR	H	1.1 km	MPC; JPL
229289	2005 CO_{57}	—	February 2, 2005	Socorro	LINEAR	·	5.1 km	MPC; JPL
229290	2005 CX_{60}	—	February 5, 2005	Charleston	Astronomical Research Observatory	·	3.2 km	MPC; JPL
229291	2005 CY_{63}	—	February 9, 2005	Anderson Mesa	LONEOS	THM	2.6 km	MPC; JPL
229292	2005 CG_{69}	—	February 2, 2005	Mount Nyukasa	Japan Aerospace Exploration Agency	·	2.6 km	MPC; JPL
229293	2005 CS_{79}	—	February 1, 2005	Kitt Peak	Spacewatch	·	3.7 km	MPC; JPL
229294	2005 EH_{2}	—	March 3, 2005	Goodricke-Pigott	R. A. Tucker	H	830 m	MPC; JPL
229295	2005 EN_{2}	—	March 3, 2005	Vail-Jarnac	Jarnac	LIX	4.9 km	MPC; JPL
229296	2005 EQ_{5}	—	March 1, 2005	Kitt Peak	Spacewatch	THM	3.6 km	MPC; JPL
229297	2005 EZ_{6}	—	March 1, 2005	Kitt Peak	Spacewatch	·	3.3 km	MPC; JPL
229298	2005 EE_{20}	—	March 3, 2005	Catalina	CSS	THM	3.2 km	MPC; JPL
229299	2005 ET_{30}	—	March 3, 2005	Catalina	CSS	LIX	5.3 km	MPC; JPL
229300	2005 EL_{41}	—	March 1, 2005	Catalina	CSS	·	6.1 km	MPC; JPL

== 229301–229400 ==
back to top

Designation			Discovery			Properties		Ref
Permanent	Provisional	Named after	Date	Site	Discoverer(s)	Category	Diam.	Ref
229301	2005 ED_{42}	—	March 2, 2005	Kitt Peak	Spacewatch	THM	2.5 km	MPC; JPL
229302	2005 EF_{49}	—	March 3, 2005	Catalina	CSS	·	4.3 km	MPC; JPL
229303	2005 EE_{80}	—	March 3, 2005	Catalina	CSS	·	4.6 km	MPC; JPL
229304	2005 EX_{93}	—	March 8, 2005	Socorro	LINEAR	H	920 m	MPC; JPL
229305	2005 EN_{95}	—	March 4, 2005	Calvin-Rehoboth	Calvin College	·	3.1 km	MPC; JPL
229306	2005 EQ_{100}	—	March 3, 2005	Catalina	CSS	·	4.5 km	MPC; JPL
229307	2005 EH_{153}	—	March 8, 2005	Catalina	CSS	H	750 m	MPC; JPL
229308	2005 EN_{158}	—	March 9, 2005	Mount Lemmon	Mount Lemmon Survey	THM	4.3 km	MPC; JPL
229309	2005 EF_{196}	—	March 11, 2005	Mount Lemmon	Mount Lemmon Survey	·	1.7 km	MPC; JPL
229310	2005 EL_{276}	—	March 8, 2005	Catalina	CSS	·	6.3 km	MPC; JPL
229311	2005 EG_{281}	—	March 10, 2005	Anderson Mesa	LONEOS	·	4.2 km	MPC; JPL
229312	2005 GQ_{35}	—	April 2, 2005	Catalina	CSS	·	3.9 km	MPC; JPL
229313	2005 GK_{64}	—	April 2, 2005	Catalina	CSS	·	4.0 km	MPC; JPL
229314	2005 GW_{94}	—	April 6, 2005	Kitt Peak	Spacewatch	·	1.0 km	MPC; JPL
229315	2005 GK_{123}	—	April 7, 2005	Catalina	CSS	H	1.0 km	MPC; JPL
229316	2005 JB_{69}	—	May 6, 2005	Kitt Peak	Spacewatch	T_{j} (2.99)	5.5 km	MPC; JPL
229317	2005 MJ_{12}	—	June 28, 2005	Palomar	NEAT	·	1.8 km	MPC; JPL
229318	2005 MH_{15}	—	June 29, 2005	Palomar	NEAT	·	950 m	MPC; JPL
229319	2005 ML_{17}	—	June 27, 2005	Kitt Peak	Spacewatch	·	960 m	MPC; JPL
229320	2005 MZ_{31}	—	June 28, 2005	Palomar	NEAT	·	1.1 km	MPC; JPL
229321	2005 NL_{2}	—	July 2, 2005	Catalina	CSS	·	1.3 km	MPC; JPL
229322	2005 NV_{11}	—	July 4, 2005	Kitt Peak	Spacewatch	·	720 m	MPC; JPL
229323	2005 NL_{13}	—	July 5, 2005	Mount Lemmon	Mount Lemmon Survey	·	820 m	MPC; JPL
229324	2005 NV_{45}	—	July 5, 2005	Mount Lemmon	Mount Lemmon Survey	·	780 m	MPC; JPL
229325	2005 NL_{60}	—	July 9, 2005	Catalina	CSS	·	1.4 km	MPC; JPL
229326	2005 NM_{60}	—	July 9, 2005	Catalina	CSS	(2076)	1.3 km	MPC; JPL
229327	2005 NR_{74}	—	July 9, 2005	Kitt Peak	Spacewatch	·	890 m	MPC; JPL
229328	2005 NT_{95}	—	July 7, 2005	Kitt Peak	Spacewatch	·	850 m	MPC; JPL
229329	2005 NZ_{98}	—	July 10, 2005	Kitt Peak	Spacewatch	·	750 m	MPC; JPL
229330	2005 OS	—	July 17, 2005	Palomar	NEAT	·	1.5 km	MPC; JPL
229331	2005 OS_{12}	—	July 29, 2005	Palomar	NEAT	·	2.4 km	MPC; JPL
229332	2005 OH_{27}	—	July 30, 2005	Palomar	NEAT	·	920 m	MPC; JPL
229333	2005 QC_{2}	—	August 22, 2005	Haleakala	NEAT	·	1.1 km	MPC; JPL
229334	2005 QV_{4}	—	August 24, 2005	Haleakala	NEAT	·	1.5 km	MPC; JPL
229335	2005 QY_{9}	—	August 25, 2005	Campo Imperatore	CINEOS	V	780 m	MPC; JPL
229336	2005 QW_{10}	—	August 24, 2005	Palomar	NEAT	MAS	1.1 km	MPC; JPL
229337	2005 QP_{12}	—	August 24, 2005	Palomar	NEAT	·	1.4 km	MPC; JPL
229338	2005 QS_{14}	—	August 25, 2005	Palomar	NEAT	NYS	1.0 km	MPC; JPL
229339	2005 QM_{15}	—	August 25, 2005	Palomar	NEAT	·	1.2 km	MPC; JPL
229340	2005 QQ_{21}	—	August 26, 2005	Haleakala	NEAT	·	1.4 km	MPC; JPL
229341	2005 QK_{29}	—	August 25, 2005	Palomar	NEAT	·	1.3 km	MPC; JPL
229342	2005 QM_{32}	—	August 24, 2005	Palomar	NEAT	·	990 m	MPC; JPL
229343	2005 QG_{33}	—	August 25, 2005	Palomar	NEAT	·	1.4 km	MPC; JPL
229344	2005 QH_{38}	—	August 25, 2005	Palomar	NEAT	·	880 m	MPC; JPL
229345	2005 QJ_{45}	—	August 26, 2005	Palomar	NEAT	·	3.4 km	MPC; JPL
229346	2005 QF_{49}	—	August 26, 2005	Anderson Mesa	LONEOS	NYS	1.5 km	MPC; JPL
229347	2005 QC_{50}	—	August 26, 2005	Palomar	NEAT	·	2.2 km	MPC; JPL
229348	2005 QH_{51}	—	August 26, 2005	Palomar	NEAT	·	1.7 km	MPC; JPL
229349	2005 QR_{52}	—	August 27, 2005	Kitt Peak	Spacewatch	·	1.8 km	MPC; JPL
229350	2005 QV_{52}	—	August 27, 2005	Siding Spring	SSS	·	1.4 km	MPC; JPL
229351	2005 QE_{55}	—	August 28, 2005	Anderson Mesa	LONEOS	·	1.0 km	MPC; JPL
229352	2005 QB_{57}	—	August 29, 2005	Vicques	M. Ory	ERI	1.8 km	MPC; JPL
229353	2005 QN_{65}	—	August 26, 2005	Haleakala	NEAT	·	1.7 km	MPC; JPL
229354	2005 QX_{67}	—	August 28, 2005	Siding Spring	SSS	·	1.2 km	MPC; JPL
229355	2005 QU_{74}	—	August 29, 2005	Anderson Mesa	LONEOS	·	1.3 km	MPC; JPL
229356	2005 QA_{84}	—	August 29, 2005	Anderson Mesa	LONEOS	MAS	1.0 km	MPC; JPL
229357	2005 QW_{87}	—	August 28, 2005	Bergisch Gladbach	W. Bickel	·	1.3 km	MPC; JPL
229358	2005 QS_{99}	—	August 27, 2005	Palomar	NEAT	·	1.0 km	MPC; JPL
229359	2005 QX_{104}	—	August 27, 2005	Palomar	NEAT	·	1.0 km	MPC; JPL
229360	2005 QE_{106}	—	August 27, 2005	Palomar	NEAT	·	980 m	MPC; JPL
229361	2005 QU_{106}	—	August 27, 2005	Palomar	NEAT	·	1.1 km	MPC; JPL
229362	2005 QW_{112}	—	August 27, 2005	Palomar	NEAT	·	1.9 km	MPC; JPL
229363	2005 QY_{156}	—	August 30, 2005	Palomar	NEAT	·	1.4 km	MPC; JPL
229364	2005 QY_{170}	—	August 29, 2005	Palomar	NEAT	·	1.9 km	MPC; JPL
229365	2005 QK_{171}	—	August 29, 2005	Palomar	NEAT	·	1.9 km	MPC; JPL
229366	2005 QE_{180}	—	August 27, 2005	Anderson Mesa	LONEOS	·	1.5 km	MPC; JPL
229367	2005 QM_{188}	—	August 31, 2005	Kitt Peak	Spacewatch	·	1.8 km	MPC; JPL
229368	2005 RC_{3}	—	September 5, 2005	Wrightwood	J. W. Young	·	1.7 km	MPC; JPL
229369	2005 RF_{5}	—	September 3, 2005	Palomar	NEAT	·	1.5 km	MPC; JPL
229370	2005 RZ_{7}	—	September 8, 2005	Socorro	LINEAR	·	970 m	MPC; JPL
229371	2005 RS_{8}	—	September 8, 2005	Socorro	LINEAR	NYS	1.2 km	MPC; JPL
229372	2005 RM_{9}	—	September 3, 2005	Kingsnake	J. V. McClusky	·	1.2 km	MPC; JPL
229373	2005 RG_{11}	—	September 10, 2005	Anderson Mesa	LONEOS	·	1.6 km	MPC; JPL
229374	2005 RM_{11}	—	September 10, 2005	Anderson Mesa	LONEOS	·	2.1 km	MPC; JPL
229375	2005 RG_{25}	—	September 10, 2005	Anderson Mesa	LONEOS	·	1.4 km	MPC; JPL
229376	2005 SP	—	September 22, 2005	Uccle	T. Pauwels	·	1.0 km	MPC; JPL
229377	2005 SJ_{6}	—	September 23, 2005	Kitt Peak	Spacewatch	·	1.0 km	MPC; JPL
229378	2005 SN_{8}	—	September 25, 2005	Catalina	CSS	·	980 m	MPC; JPL
229379	2005 SZ_{9}	—	September 24, 2005	Kitt Peak	Spacewatch	·	1.5 km	MPC; JPL
229380	2005 SX_{10}	—	September 23, 2005	Kitt Peak	Spacewatch	·	2.2 km	MPC; JPL
229381	2005 SR_{14}	—	September 25, 2005	Catalina	CSS	·	1.5 km	MPC; JPL
229382	2005 SE_{50}	—	September 24, 2005	Kitt Peak	Spacewatch	·	1.0 km	MPC; JPL
229383	2005 SV_{52}	—	September 25, 2005	Kitt Peak	Spacewatch	NYS	1.5 km	MPC; JPL
229384	2005 SB_{60}	—	September 26, 2005	Kitt Peak	Spacewatch	·	1.5 km	MPC; JPL
229385	2005 SV_{61}	—	September 26, 2005	Kitt Peak	Spacewatch	·	1.4 km	MPC; JPL
229386	2005 SL_{68}	—	September 27, 2005	Kitt Peak	Spacewatch	·	1.2 km	MPC; JPL
229387	2005 SG_{70}	—	September 28, 2005	Palomar	NEAT	MAS	900 m	MPC; JPL
229388	2005 SU_{70}	—	September 27, 2005	Junk Bond	D. Healy	·	1.3 km	MPC; JPL
229389	2005 SY_{79}	—	September 24, 2005	Kitt Peak	Spacewatch	·	690 m	MPC; JPL
229390	2005 SH_{88}	—	September 24, 2005	Anderson Mesa	LONEOS	·	1.2 km	MPC; JPL
229391	2005 SA_{91}	—	September 24, 2005	Kitt Peak	Spacewatch	·	880 m	MPC; JPL
229392	2005 SA_{103}	—	September 25, 2005	Kitt Peak	Spacewatch	·	1.5 km	MPC; JPL
229393	2005 SW_{117}	—	September 28, 2005	Palomar	NEAT	V	920 m	MPC; JPL
229394	2005 SF_{123}	—	September 29, 2005	Anderson Mesa	LONEOS	·	2.4 km	MPC; JPL
229395	2005 SK_{124}	—	September 29, 2005	Anderson Mesa	LONEOS	·	1.2 km	MPC; JPL
229396	2005 SA_{129}	—	September 29, 2005	Mount Lemmon	Mount Lemmon Survey	NYS	1.6 km	MPC; JPL
229397	2005 SM_{134}	—	September 29, 2005	Anderson Mesa	LONEOS	·	1.3 km	MPC; JPL
229398	2005 SL_{140}	—	September 25, 2005	Kitt Peak	Spacewatch	MAS	970 m	MPC; JPL
229399	2005 SP_{149}	—	September 25, 2005	Kitt Peak	Spacewatch	·	1.3 km	MPC; JPL
229400	2005 SW_{149}	—	September 25, 2005	Kitt Peak	Spacewatch	·	970 m	MPC; JPL

== 229401–229500 ==
back to top

Designation			Discovery			Properties		Ref
Permanent	Provisional	Named after	Date	Site	Discoverer(s)	Category	Diam.	Ref
229401	2005 SU_{152}	—	September 25, 2005	Palomar	NEAT	(1547)	2.0 km	MPC; JPL
229402	2005 SJ_{195}	—	September 30, 2005	Kitt Peak	Spacewatch	MAS	780 m	MPC; JPL
229403	2005 SB_{209}	—	September 30, 2005	Socorro	LINEAR	·	1.9 km	MPC; JPL
229404	2005 SU_{213}	—	September 30, 2005	Anderson Mesa	LONEOS	·	1.8 km	MPC; JPL
229405	2005 SL_{215}	—	September 30, 2005	Catalina	CSS	·	1.9 km	MPC; JPL
229406	2005 SX_{221}	—	September 27, 2005	Socorro	LINEAR	·	1.9 km	MPC; JPL
229407	2005 SU_{224}	—	September 29, 2005	Mount Lemmon	Mount Lemmon Survey	·	2.1 km	MPC; JPL
229408	2005 SS_{229}	—	September 30, 2005	Anderson Mesa	LONEOS	·	1.4 km	MPC; JPL
229409	2005 SB_{237}	—	September 29, 2005	Kitt Peak	Spacewatch	·	970 m	MPC; JPL
229410	2005 SD_{238}	—	September 29, 2005	Kitt Peak	Spacewatch	·	1.5 km	MPC; JPL
229411	2005 SD_{243}	—	September 30, 2005	Kitt Peak	Spacewatch	NYS	1.5 km	MPC; JPL
229412	2005 SM_{249}	—	September 30, 2005	Mount Lemmon	Mount Lemmon Survey	NYS	1.6 km	MPC; JPL
229413	2005 SE_{257}	—	September 22, 2005	Palomar	NEAT	·	1.6 km	MPC; JPL
229414	2005 SS_{264}	—	September 25, 2005	Kitt Peak	Spacewatch	·	1.3 km	MPC; JPL
229415	2005 SP_{278}	—	September 29, 2005	Kitt Peak	Spacewatch	·	2.2 km	MPC; JPL
229416	2005 TT_{3}	—	October 1, 2005	Anderson Mesa	LONEOS	·	1.8 km	MPC; JPL
229417	2005 TN_{10}	—	October 2, 2005	Palomar	NEAT	·	2.2 km	MPC; JPL
229418	2005 TY_{10}	—	October 2, 2005	Mount Lemmon	Mount Lemmon Survey	NYS	1.1 km	MPC; JPL
229419	2005 TZ_{17}	—	October 1, 2005	Socorro	LINEAR	·	1.7 km	MPC; JPL
229420	2005 TH_{23}	—	October 1, 2005	Anderson Mesa	LONEOS	·	1.4 km	MPC; JPL
229421	2005 TT_{26}	—	October 1, 2005	Mount Lemmon	Mount Lemmon Survey	NYS	1.3 km	MPC; JPL
229422	2005 TJ_{39}	—	October 1, 2005	Kitt Peak	Spacewatch	·	1.2 km	MPC; JPL
229423	2005 TG_{41}	—	October 2, 2005	Kitt Peak	Spacewatch	·	1.8 km	MPC; JPL
229424	2005 TT_{48}	—	October 8, 2005	Goodricke-Pigott	R. A. Tucker	NYS	1.5 km	MPC; JPL
229425 Grosspointner	2005 TW_{50}	Grosspointner	October 11, 2005	Altschwendt	W. Ries	·	1.8 km	MPC; JPL
229426	2005 TB_{52}	—	October 1, 2005	Kitt Peak	Spacewatch	·	1.7 km	MPC; JPL
229427	2005 TT_{52}	—	October 10, 2005	Moletai	K. Černis, Zdanavicius, J.	·	1.3 km	MPC; JPL
229428	2005 TP_{71}	—	October 1, 2005	Catalina	CSS	NYS	1.6 km	MPC; JPL
229429	2005 TA_{72}	—	October 3, 2005	Catalina	CSS	·	1.2 km	MPC; JPL
229430	2005 TP_{99}	—	October 7, 2005	Socorro	LINEAR	NYS	1.4 km	MPC; JPL
229431	2005 TY_{105}	—	October 9, 2005	Kitt Peak	Spacewatch	·	1.4 km	MPC; JPL
229432	2005 TQ_{106}	—	October 4, 2005	Mount Lemmon	Mount Lemmon Survey	MAS	760 m	MPC; JPL
229433	2005 TJ_{138}	—	October 7, 2005	Catalina	CSS	·	1.0 km	MPC; JPL
229434	2005 TH_{143}	—	October 8, 2005	Kitt Peak	Spacewatch	·	1.2 km	MPC; JPL
229435	2005 TO_{161}	—	October 9, 2005	Kitt Peak	Spacewatch	·	1.9 km	MPC; JPL
229436	2005 TL_{166}	—	October 9, 2005	Kitt Peak	Spacewatch	·	910 m	MPC; JPL
229437	2005 TZ_{170}	—	October 8, 2005	Socorro	LINEAR	·	2.3 km	MPC; JPL
229438	2005 TQ_{171}	—	October 10, 2005	Catalina	CSS	V	970 m	MPC; JPL
229439	2005 TA_{180}	—	October 6, 2005	Mount Lemmon	Mount Lemmon Survey	·	2.7 km	MPC; JPL
229440 Filimon	2005 UE_{6}	Filimon	October 27, 2005	Altschwendt	W. Ries	HNS	2.3 km	MPC; JPL
229441	2005 UJ_{8}	—	October 27, 2005	Ottmarsheim	C. Rinner	NYS · fast	1.5 km	MPC; JPL
229442	2005 UC_{14}	—	October 22, 2005	Kitt Peak	Spacewatch	MAS	1.0 km	MPC; JPL
229443	2005 UA_{51}	—	October 23, 2005	Catalina	CSS	·	1.3 km	MPC; JPL
229444	2005 UF_{54}	—	October 23, 2005	Catalina	CSS	·	2.1 km	MPC; JPL
229445	2005 UH_{59}	—	October 24, 2005	Palomar	NEAT	BRG	2.2 km	MPC; JPL
229446	2005 UZ_{70}	—	October 23, 2005	Catalina	CSS	·	2.0 km	MPC; JPL
229447	2005 UH_{72}	—	October 23, 2005	Catalina	CSS	PHO	1.4 km	MPC; JPL
229448	2005 UW_{97}	—	October 22, 2005	Kitt Peak	Spacewatch	·	2.4 km	MPC; JPL
229449	2005 UY_{110}	—	October 22, 2005	Kitt Peak	Spacewatch	NYS	1.8 km	MPC; JPL
229450	2005 UK_{115}	—	October 23, 2005	Kitt Peak	Spacewatch	·	1.2 km	MPC; JPL
229451	2005 UH_{148}	—	October 26, 2005	Kitt Peak	Spacewatch	·	1.8 km	MPC; JPL
229452	2005 UT_{161}	—	October 25, 2005	Kitt Peak	Spacewatch	MAS	1.0 km	MPC; JPL
229453	2005 UJ_{162}	—	October 27, 2005	Anderson Mesa	LONEOS	·	2.2 km	MPC; JPL
229454	2005 UQ_{162}	—	October 27, 2005	Anderson Mesa	LONEOS	·	1.8 km	MPC; JPL
229455	2005 UM_{180}	—	October 24, 2005	Kitt Peak	Spacewatch	·	2.5 km	MPC; JPL
229456	2005 UN_{190}	—	October 27, 2005	Mount Lemmon	Mount Lemmon Survey	NYS	1.4 km	MPC; JPL
229457	2005 UZ_{191}	—	October 27, 2005	Mount Lemmon	Mount Lemmon Survey	·	1.3 km	MPC; JPL
229458	2005 UC_{196}	—	October 24, 2005	Kitt Peak	Spacewatch	·	1.5 km	MPC; JPL
229459	2005 UM_{196}	—	October 24, 2005	Kitt Peak	Spacewatch	·	1.4 km	MPC; JPL
229460	2005 UO_{196}	—	October 24, 2005	Kitt Peak	Spacewatch	MAS	820 m	MPC; JPL
229461	2005 UG_{217}	—	October 27, 2005	Kitt Peak	Spacewatch	NYS	1.5 km	MPC; JPL
229462	2005 UU_{217}	—	October 22, 2005	Kitt Peak	Spacewatch	·	910 m	MPC; JPL
229463	2005 UZ_{221}	—	October 25, 2005	Kitt Peak	Spacewatch	NYS	1.2 km	MPC; JPL
229464	2005 UK_{226}	—	October 25, 2005	Kitt Peak	Spacewatch	·	1.6 km	MPC; JPL
229465	2005 UB_{250}	—	October 23, 2005	Palomar	NEAT	·	1.5 km	MPC; JPL
229466	2005 UO_{252}	—	October 26, 2005	Kitt Peak	Spacewatch	WIT	1.3 km	MPC; JPL
229467	2005 UT_{252}	—	October 26, 2005	Anderson Mesa	LONEOS	·	1.9 km	MPC; JPL
229468	2005 UE_{253}	—	October 27, 2005	Kitt Peak	Spacewatch	MAS	870 m	MPC; JPL
229469	2005 UV_{253}	—	October 28, 2005	Kitt Peak	Spacewatch	RAF	930 m	MPC; JPL
229470	2005 UT_{267}	—	October 27, 2005	Kitt Peak	Spacewatch	·	1.2 km	MPC; JPL
229471	2005 UX_{272}	—	October 28, 2005	Kitt Peak	Spacewatch	·	1.1 km	MPC; JPL
229472	2005 UA_{275}	—	October 28, 2005	Mount Lemmon	Mount Lemmon Survey	·	1.9 km	MPC; JPL
229473	2005 UV_{278}	—	October 24, 2005	Kitt Peak	Spacewatch	·	1.6 km	MPC; JPL
229474	2005 UB_{288}	—	October 26, 2005	Kitt Peak	Spacewatch	NYS	1.2 km	MPC; JPL
229475	2005 UY_{293}	—	October 26, 2005	Kitt Peak	Spacewatch	·	1.1 km	MPC; JPL
229476	2005 UU_{296}	—	October 26, 2005	Kitt Peak	Spacewatch	·	1.5 km	MPC; JPL
229477	2005 UX_{297}	—	October 26, 2005	Kitt Peak	Spacewatch	·	2.8 km	MPC; JPL
229478	2005 UN_{299}	—	October 26, 2005	Kitt Peak	Spacewatch	·	1.8 km	MPC; JPL
229479	2005 UJ_{302}	—	October 26, 2005	Kitt Peak	Spacewatch	·	1.4 km	MPC; JPL
229480	2005 UU_{318}	—	October 27, 2005	Kitt Peak	Spacewatch	NYS	1.5 km	MPC; JPL
229481	2005 UM_{323}	—	October 28, 2005	Catalina	CSS	MAS	880 m	MPC; JPL
229482	2005 UD_{337}	—	October 31, 2005	Kitt Peak	Spacewatch	MAS	900 m	MPC; JPL
229483	2005 UY_{349}	—	October 27, 2005	Catalina	CSS	·	1.3 km	MPC; JPL
229484	2005 UU_{369}	—	October 27, 2005	Kitt Peak	Spacewatch	MAS	960 m	MPC; JPL
229485	2005 UN_{386}	—	October 30, 2005	Anderson Mesa	LONEOS	PHO	2.1 km	MPC; JPL
229486	2005 UC_{387}	—	October 30, 2005	Mount Lemmon	Mount Lemmon Survey	·	1.3 km	MPC; JPL
229487	2005 UQ_{403}	—	October 29, 2005	Mount Lemmon	Mount Lemmon Survey	MAS	950 m	MPC; JPL
229488	2005 UX_{438}	—	October 28, 2005	Socorro	LINEAR	·	2.5 km	MPC; JPL
229489	2005 UR_{445}	—	October 31, 2005	Mount Lemmon	Mount Lemmon Survey	·	1.1 km	MPC; JPL
229490	2005 UD_{452}	—	October 28, 2005	Mount Lemmon	Mount Lemmon Survey	·	4.5 km	MPC; JPL
229491	2005 UR_{456}	—	October 30, 2005	Catalina	CSS	·	2.7 km	MPC; JPL
229492	2005 UU_{461}	—	October 29, 2005	Kitt Peak	Spacewatch	·	2.8 km	MPC; JPL
229493	2005 UX_{483}	—	October 22, 2005	Catalina	CSS	V	1.1 km	MPC; JPL
229494	2005 US_{499}	—	October 27, 2005	Catalina	CSS	·	1.0 km	MPC; JPL
229495	2005 UG_{508}	—	October 24, 2005	Mauna Kea	D. J. Tholen	·	2.9 km	MPC; JPL
229496	2005 UH_{509}	—	October 27, 2005	Mount Lemmon	Mount Lemmon Survey	·	1.9 km	MPC; JPL
229497	2005 VW_{4}	—	November 6, 2005	Nogales	M. Ory	MAS	820 m	MPC; JPL
229498	2005 VX_{13}	—	November 3, 2005	Catalina	CSS	·	1.6 km	MPC; JPL
229499	2005 VW_{47}	—	November 5, 2005	Kitt Peak	Spacewatch	·	1.5 km	MPC; JPL
229500	2005 VZ_{50}	—	November 3, 2005	Catalina	CSS	·	1.8 km	MPC; JPL

== 229501–229600 ==
back to top

Designation			Discovery			Properties		Ref
Permanent	Provisional	Named after	Date	Site	Discoverer(s)	Category	Diam.	Ref
229501	2005 VY_{55}	—	November 4, 2005	Catalina	CSS	·	2.0 km	MPC; JPL
229502	2005 VS_{80}	—	November 5, 2005	Catalina	CSS	V	900 m	MPC; JPL
229503	2005 WX_{1}	—	November 19, 2005	Palomar	NEAT	·	1.6 km	MPC; JPL
229504	2005 WA_{4}	—	November 23, 2005	Ottmarsheim	C. Rinner	(5)	1.5 km	MPC; JPL
229505	2005 WQ_{38}	—	November 22, 2005	Kitt Peak	Spacewatch	(5)	1.6 km	MPC; JPL
229506	2005 WO_{64}	—	November 25, 2005	Mount Lemmon	Mount Lemmon Survey	·	1.6 km	MPC; JPL
229507	2005 WF_{72}	—	November 22, 2005	Catalina	CSS	PHO	1.8 km	MPC; JPL
229508	2005 WC_{80}	—	November 25, 2005	Kitt Peak	Spacewatch	·	1.8 km	MPC; JPL
229509	2005 WM_{86}	—	November 28, 2005	Mount Lemmon	Mount Lemmon Survey	·	3.4 km	MPC; JPL
229510	2005 WO_{88}	—	November 28, 2005	Mount Lemmon	Mount Lemmon Survey	EUN	1.7 km	MPC; JPL
229511	2005 WX_{97}	—	November 26, 2005	Kitt Peak	Spacewatch	·	2.3 km	MPC; JPL
229512	2005 WU_{113}	—	November 28, 2005	Kitt Peak	Spacewatch	·	2.3 km	MPC; JPL
229513	2005 WZ_{123}	—	November 25, 2005	Mount Lemmon	Mount Lemmon Survey	MAS	910 m	MPC; JPL
229514	2005 WB_{148}	—	November 26, 2005	Kitt Peak	Spacewatch	·	2.7 km	MPC; JPL
229515	2005 WO_{159}	—	November 29, 2005	Socorro	LINEAR	JUN	2.1 km	MPC; JPL
229516	2005 WE_{170}	—	November 30, 2005	Kitt Peak	Spacewatch	·	1.4 km	MPC; JPL
229517	2005 WS_{170}	—	November 30, 2005	Kitt Peak	Spacewatch	·	1.5 km	MPC; JPL
229518	2005 WZ_{173}	—	November 30, 2005	Socorro	LINEAR	EUN	1.7 km	MPC; JPL
229519	2005 WM_{178}	—	November 30, 2005	Mount Lemmon	Mount Lemmon Survey	·	2.4 km	MPC; JPL
229520	2005 WY_{185}	—	November 30, 2005	Socorro	LINEAR	·	2.9 km	MPC; JPL
229521	2005 WG_{195}	—	November 30, 2005	Socorro	LINEAR	·	1.4 km	MPC; JPL
229522	2005 XQ_{2}	—	December 1, 2005	Kitt Peak	Spacewatch	·	2.3 km	MPC; JPL
229523	2005 XF_{7}	—	December 4, 2005	Socorro	LINEAR	·	2.8 km	MPC; JPL
229524	2005 XG_{11}	—	December 1, 2005	Kitt Peak	Spacewatch	·	1.8 km	MPC; JPL
229525	2005 XY_{14}	—	December 1, 2005	Kitt Peak	Spacewatch	·	2.3 km	MPC; JPL
229526	2005 XK_{21}	—	December 2, 2005	Kitt Peak	Spacewatch	·	1.4 km	MPC; JPL
229527	2005 XN_{24}	—	December 2, 2005	Mount Lemmon	Mount Lemmon Survey	·	1.9 km	MPC; JPL
229528	2005 XK_{38}	—	December 4, 2005	Kitt Peak	Spacewatch	·	2.9 km	MPC; JPL
229529	2005 XO_{43}	—	December 2, 2005	Kitt Peak	Spacewatch	·	1.8 km	MPC; JPL
229530	2005 XT_{65}	—	December 5, 2005	Kitt Peak	Spacewatch	·	3.6 km	MPC; JPL
229531	2005 XE_{79}	—	December 5, 2005	Catalina	CSS	EUN	2.2 km	MPC; JPL
229532	2005 YN_{26}	—	December 24, 2005	Palomar	NEAT	·	2.1 km	MPC; JPL
229533	2005 YZ_{33}	—	December 24, 2005	Kitt Peak	Spacewatch	·	2.7 km	MPC; JPL
229534	2005 YO_{36}	—	December 25, 2005	Kitt Peak	Spacewatch	·	2.7 km	MPC; JPL
229535	2005 YQ_{36}	—	December 25, 2005	Kitt Peak	Spacewatch	·	2.6 km	MPC; JPL
229536	2005 YC_{37}	—	December 26, 2005	7300	W. K. Y. Yeung	·	1.7 km	MPC; JPL
229537	2005 YU_{42}	—	December 24, 2005	Kitt Peak	Spacewatch	·	2.3 km	MPC; JPL
229538	2005 YM_{75}	—	December 24, 2005	Kitt Peak	Spacewatch	·	1.9 km	MPC; JPL
229539	2005 YA_{79}	—	December 24, 2005	Kitt Peak	Spacewatch	·	1.6 km	MPC; JPL
229540	2005 YP_{86}	—	December 25, 2005	Mount Lemmon	Mount Lemmon Survey	·	1.9 km	MPC; JPL
229541	2005 YA_{110}	—	December 25, 2005	Kitt Peak	Spacewatch	·	1.7 km	MPC; JPL
229542	2005 YP_{113}	—	December 25, 2005	Kitt Peak	Spacewatch	·	3.3 km	MPC; JPL
229543	2005 YJ_{115}	—	December 25, 2005	Kitt Peak	Spacewatch	·	2.0 km	MPC; JPL
229544	2005 YP_{118}	—	December 25, 2005	Kitt Peak	Spacewatch	·	2.7 km	MPC; JPL
229545	2005 YU_{121}	—	December 28, 2005	Socorro	LINEAR	·	3.3 km	MPC; JPL
229546	2005 YQ_{124}	—	December 26, 2005	Kitt Peak	Spacewatch	(5)	2.1 km	MPC; JPL
229547	2005 YM_{138}	—	December 26, 2005	Kitt Peak	Spacewatch	·	1.9 km	MPC; JPL
229548	2005 YD_{141}	—	December 28, 2005	Mount Lemmon	Mount Lemmon Survey	NEM	3.3 km	MPC; JPL
229549	2005 YG_{150}	—	December 25, 2005	Kitt Peak	Spacewatch	·	2.0 km	MPC; JPL
229550	2005 YP_{162}	—	December 27, 2005	Mount Lemmon	Mount Lemmon Survey	·	1.7 km	MPC; JPL
229551	2005 YP_{173}	—	December 24, 2005	Catalina	CSS	EUN	2.0 km	MPC; JPL
229552	2005 YP_{189}	—	December 29, 2005	Kitt Peak	Spacewatch	·	1.3 km	MPC; JPL
229553	2005 YT_{191}	—	December 30, 2005	Kitt Peak	Spacewatch	·	2.1 km	MPC; JPL
229554	2005 YR_{195}	—	December 31, 2005	Kitt Peak	Spacewatch	AGN	1.5 km	MPC; JPL
229555	2005 YD_{202}	—	December 24, 2005	Kitt Peak	Spacewatch	EUN	2.4 km	MPC; JPL
229556	2005 YO_{217}	—	December 30, 2005	Mount Lemmon	Mount Lemmon Survey	·	2.8 km	MPC; JPL
229557	2005 YE_{227}	—	December 25, 2005	Mount Lemmon	Mount Lemmon Survey	(5)	1.8 km	MPC; JPL
229558	2005 YV_{230}	—	December 26, 2005	Mount Lemmon	Mount Lemmon Survey	·	3.2 km	MPC; JPL
229559	2005 YX_{240}	—	December 29, 2005	Kitt Peak	Spacewatch	·	2.2 km	MPC; JPL
229560	2005 YV_{272}	—	December 30, 2005	Mount Lemmon	Mount Lemmon Survey	·	2.7 km	MPC; JPL
229561	2005 YA_{287}	—	December 26, 2005	Mount Lemmon	Mount Lemmon Survey	·	2.3 km	MPC; JPL
229562	2006 AX_{8}	—	January 2, 2006	Catalina	CSS	EUN	1.8 km	MPC; JPL
229563	2006 AA_{9}	—	January 2, 2006	Socorro	LINEAR	·	1.9 km	MPC; JPL
229564	2006 AK_{28}	—	January 6, 2006	Mount Lemmon	Mount Lemmon Survey	·	1.6 km	MPC; JPL
229565	2006 AF_{30}	—	January 2, 2006	Mount Lemmon	Mount Lemmon Survey	·	2.1 km	MPC; JPL
229566	2006 AP_{32}	—	January 5, 2006	Kitt Peak	Spacewatch	MRX	1.6 km	MPC; JPL
229567	2006 AR_{33}	—	January 6, 2006	Socorro	LINEAR	slow	4.7 km	MPC; JPL
229568	2006 AA_{41}	—	January 7, 2006	Kitt Peak	Spacewatch	·	2.5 km	MPC; JPL
229569	2006 AL_{43}	—	January 6, 2006	Kitt Peak	Spacewatch	·	1.5 km	MPC; JPL
229570	2006 AA_{45}	—	January 2, 2006	Catalina	CSS	·	3.4 km	MPC; JPL
229571	2006 AH_{49}	—	January 5, 2006	Kitt Peak	Spacewatch	·	1.5 km	MPC; JPL
229572	2006 AG_{73}	—	January 8, 2006	Mount Lemmon	Mount Lemmon Survey	·	2.7 km	MPC; JPL
229573	2006 AX_{77}	—	January 7, 2006	Mount Lemmon	Mount Lemmon Survey	·	2.9 km	MPC; JPL
229574	2006 AX_{95}	—	January 10, 2006	Kitt Peak	Spacewatch	·	1.4 km	MPC; JPL
229575	2006 BA_{1}	—	January 18, 2006	Catalina	CSS	·	2.0 km	MPC; JPL
229576	2006 BV_{17}	—	January 22, 2006	Mount Lemmon	Mount Lemmon Survey	·	2.9 km	MPC; JPL
229577	2006 BZ_{19}	—	January 22, 2006	Anderson Mesa	LONEOS	·	3.0 km	MPC; JPL
229578	2006 BD_{38}	—	January 23, 2006	Kitt Peak	Spacewatch	·	2.4 km	MPC; JPL
229579	2006 BU_{79}	—	January 23, 2006	Kitt Peak	Spacewatch	NAE	4.9 km	MPC; JPL
229580	2006 BT_{81}	—	January 23, 2006	Kitt Peak	Spacewatch	·	2.3 km	MPC; JPL
229581	2006 BW_{89}	—	January 25, 2006	Kitt Peak	Spacewatch	AGN	2.0 km	MPC; JPL
229582	2006 BD_{92}	—	January 26, 2006	Catalina	CSS	·	2.2 km	MPC; JPL
229583	2006 BF_{96}	—	January 26, 2006	Kitt Peak	Spacewatch	KOR	1.7 km	MPC; JPL
229584	2006 BR_{114}	—	January 26, 2006	Kitt Peak	Spacewatch	·	3.0 km	MPC; JPL
229585	2006 BP_{127}	—	January 26, 2006	Kitt Peak	Spacewatch	MIS	2.8 km	MPC; JPL
229586	2006 BN_{145}	—	January 23, 2006	Socorro	LINEAR	MRX	1.4 km	MPC; JPL
229587	2006 BA_{147}	—	January 31, 2006	7300	W. K. Y. Yeung	·	2.0 km	MPC; JPL
229588	2006 BL_{148}	—	January 21, 2006	Palomar	NEAT	·	2.9 km	MPC; JPL
229589	2006 BW_{148}	—	January 23, 2006	Kitt Peak	Spacewatch	·	2.5 km	MPC; JPL
229590	2006 BU_{162}	—	January 26, 2006	Mount Lemmon	Mount Lemmon Survey	·	2.8 km	MPC; JPL
229591	2006 BX_{176}	—	January 27, 2006	Kitt Peak	Spacewatch	·	3.6 km	MPC; JPL
229592	2006 BE_{183}	—	January 27, 2006	Mount Lemmon	Mount Lemmon Survey	·	2.0 km	MPC; JPL
229593	2006 BX_{189}	—	January 28, 2006	Kitt Peak	Spacewatch	KOR	1.8 km	MPC; JPL
229594	2006 BL_{204}	—	January 31, 2006	Kitt Peak	Spacewatch	·	2.1 km	MPC; JPL
229595	2006 BE_{214}	—	January 23, 2006	Socorro	LINEAR	·	2.8 km	MPC; JPL
229596	2006 BX_{219}	—	January 30, 2006	Kitt Peak	Spacewatch	(5)	2.1 km	MPC; JPL
229597	2006 BV_{220}	—	January 30, 2006	Catalina	CSS	WIT	1.5 km	MPC; JPL
229598	2006 BQ_{251}	—	January 31, 2006	Kitt Peak	Spacewatch	KOR	1.7 km	MPC; JPL
229599	2006 BM_{252}	—	January 31, 2006	Kitt Peak	Spacewatch	·	2.1 km	MPC; JPL
229600	2006 BW_{270}	—	January 31, 2006	Catalina	CSS	·	3.9 km	MPC; JPL

== 229601–229700 ==
back to top

Designation			Discovery			Properties		Ref
Permanent	Provisional	Named after	Date	Site	Discoverer(s)	Category	Diam.	Ref
229601	2006 BE_{276}	—	January 30, 2006	Kitt Peak	Spacewatch	·	2.3 km	MPC; JPL
229602	2006 CO	—	February 1, 2006	7300	W. K. Y. Yeung	GEF ·	4.1 km	MPC; JPL
229603	2006 CG_{10}	—	February 6, 2006	Socorro	LINEAR	·	3.8 km	MPC; JPL
229604	2006 CF_{22}	—	February 1, 2006	Kitt Peak	Spacewatch	·	1.4 km	MPC; JPL
229605	2006 CR_{37}	—	February 2, 2006	Mount Lemmon	Mount Lemmon Survey	·	3.0 km	MPC; JPL
229606	2006 DM_{1}	—	February 20, 2006	Kitt Peak	Spacewatch	·	1.3 km	MPC; JPL
229607	2006 DD_{10}	—	February 21, 2006	Catalina	CSS	·	3.5 km	MPC; JPL
229608	2006 DQ_{20}	—	February 20, 2006	Kitt Peak	Spacewatch	·	2.6 km	MPC; JPL
229609	2006 DQ_{27}	—	February 20, 2006	Kitt Peak	Spacewatch	·	6.1 km	MPC; JPL
229610	2006 DR_{32}	—	February 20, 2006	Mount Lemmon	Mount Lemmon Survey	·	3.5 km	MPC; JPL
229611	2006 DZ_{32}	—	February 20, 2006	Kitt Peak	Spacewatch	·	2.2 km	MPC; JPL
229612	2006 DS_{36}	—	February 20, 2006	Kitt Peak	Spacewatch	KOR	1.9 km	MPC; JPL
229613	2006 DP_{53}	—	February 24, 2006	Mount Lemmon	Mount Lemmon Survey	KOR	1.8 km	MPC; JPL
229614 Womack	2006 DF_{59}	Womack	February 24, 2006	Mount Lemmon	Mount Lemmon Survey	KOR	1.8 km	MPC; JPL
229615	2006 DZ_{66}	—	February 22, 2006	Anderson Mesa	LONEOS	·	1.7 km	MPC; JPL
229616	2006 DK_{68}	—	February 23, 2006	Wrightwood	J. W. Young	·	5.0 km	MPC; JPL
229617	2006 DY_{74}	—	February 24, 2006	Kitt Peak	Spacewatch	·	2.0 km	MPC; JPL
229618	2006 DT_{75}	—	February 24, 2006	Kitt Peak	Spacewatch	·	2.4 km	MPC; JPL
229619	2006 DH_{82}	—	February 24, 2006	Kitt Peak	Spacewatch	·	1.9 km	MPC; JPL
229620	2006 DZ_{83}	—	February 24, 2006	Kitt Peak	Spacewatch	·	4.8 km	MPC; JPL
229621	2006 DQ_{96}	—	February 24, 2006	Kitt Peak	Spacewatch	KOR	2.0 km	MPC; JPL
229622	2006 DQ_{121}	—	February 22, 2006	Anderson Mesa	LONEOS	·	3.0 km	MPC; JPL
229623	2006 DD_{128}	—	February 25, 2006	Mount Lemmon	Mount Lemmon Survey	·	2.8 km	MPC; JPL
229624	2006 DN_{133}	—	February 25, 2006	Kitt Peak	Spacewatch	·	2.5 km	MPC; JPL
229625	2006 DR_{143}	—	February 25, 2006	Mount Lemmon	Mount Lemmon Survey	·	4.0 km	MPC; JPL
229626	2006 DQ_{148}	—	February 25, 2006	Kitt Peak	Spacewatch	·	2.5 km	MPC; JPL
229627	2006 DF_{160}	—	February 27, 2006	Kitt Peak	Spacewatch	·	2.6 km	MPC; JPL
229628	2006 DA_{164}	—	February 27, 2006	Mount Lemmon	Mount Lemmon Survey	·	3.0 km	MPC; JPL
229629	2006 DF_{191}	—	February 27, 2006	Kitt Peak	Spacewatch	KOR	2.2 km	MPC; JPL
229630	2006 DR_{201}	—	February 25, 2006	Anderson Mesa	LONEOS	GEF	2.2 km	MPC; JPL
229631 Cluny	2006 ER	Cluny	March 4, 2006	Nogales	J.-C. Merlin	·	2.0 km	MPC; JPL
229632	2006 ED_{32}	—	March 3, 2006	Mount Lemmon	Mount Lemmon Survey	·	4.0 km	MPC; JPL
229633	2006 ED_{39}	—	March 4, 2006	Catalina	CSS	DOR	4.0 km	MPC; JPL
229634	2006 EE_{43}	—	March 4, 2006	Catalina	CSS	·	5.4 km	MPC; JPL
229635	2006 EC_{59}	—	March 5, 2006	Kitt Peak	Spacewatch	NEM	2.7 km	MPC; JPL
229636	2006 FS_{2}	—	March 23, 2006	Kitt Peak	Spacewatch	KOR	1.9 km	MPC; JPL
229637	2006 FU_{4}	—	March 23, 2006	Socorro	LINEAR	DOR	4.1 km	MPC; JPL
229638	2006 FN_{8}	—	March 23, 2006	Mount Lemmon	Mount Lemmon Survey	EOS	2.3 km	MPC; JPL
229639	2006 FZ_{8}	—	March 23, 2006	Kitt Peak	Spacewatch	·	3.6 km	MPC; JPL
229640	2006 FD_{11}	—	March 23, 2006	Kitt Peak	Spacewatch	·	4.3 km	MPC; JPL
229641	2006 FJ_{16}	—	March 23, 2006	Mount Lemmon	Mount Lemmon Survey	·	2.3 km	MPC; JPL
229642	2006 FU_{20}	—	March 24, 2006	Bergisch Gladbach	W. Bickel	·	4.7 km	MPC; JPL
229643	2006 FC_{38}	—	March 23, 2006	Kitt Peak	Spacewatch	KOR	2.0 km	MPC; JPL
229644	2006 FO_{42}	—	March 26, 2006	Mount Lemmon	Mount Lemmon Survey	·	3.3 km	MPC; JPL
229645	2006 FH_{49}	—	March 25, 2006	Catalina	CSS	·	4.0 km	MPC; JPL
229646	2006 FD_{50}	—	March 18, 2006	Siding Spring	SSS	·	5.9 km	MPC; JPL
229647	2006 FF_{53}	—	March 25, 2006	Kitt Peak	Spacewatch	·	3.4 km	MPC; JPL
229648	2006 GG_{2}	—	April 4, 2006	Great Shefford	Birtwhistle, P.	·	5.1 km	MPC; JPL
229649	2006 GC_{5}	—	April 2, 2006	Kitt Peak	Spacewatch	AGN	2.0 km	MPC; JPL
229650	2006 GY_{22}	—	April 2, 2006	Kitt Peak	Spacewatch	·	3.6 km	MPC; JPL
229651	2006 GR_{36}	—	April 8, 2006	Kitt Peak	Spacewatch	·	2.5 km	MPC; JPL
229652	2006 HX_{1}	—	April 18, 2006	Palomar	NEAT	·	2.8 km	MPC; JPL
229653	2006 HQ_{6}	—	April 18, 2006	Anderson Mesa	LONEOS	·	4.0 km	MPC; JPL
229654	2006 HE_{18}	—	April 19, 2006	Mount Lemmon	Mount Lemmon Survey	·	4.1 km	MPC; JPL
229655	2006 HO_{32}	—	April 19, 2006	Mount Lemmon	Mount Lemmon Survey	KOR	1.9 km	MPC; JPL
229656	2006 HH_{34}	—	April 19, 2006	Mount Lemmon	Mount Lemmon Survey	·	3.3 km	MPC; JPL
229657	2006 HT_{39}	—	April 21, 2006	Catalina	CSS	·	7.8 km	MPC; JPL
229658	2006 HV_{41}	—	April 21, 2006	Kitt Peak	Spacewatch	·	4.8 km	MPC; JPL
229659	2006 HK_{49}	—	April 25, 2006	Kitt Peak	Spacewatch	·	3.3 km	MPC; JPL
229660	2006 HB_{110}	—	April 21, 2006	Catalina	CSS	·	1.9 km	MPC; JPL
229661	2006 JV_{46}	—	May 1, 2006	Socorro	LINEAR	·	6.9 km	MPC; JPL
229662	2006 KV_{12}	—	May 20, 2006	Palomar	NEAT	·	4.9 km	MPC; JPL
229663	2006 KX_{20}	—	May 20, 2006	Catalina	CSS	·	5.4 km	MPC; JPL
229664	2006 KV_{40}	—	May 19, 2006	Mount Lemmon	Mount Lemmon Survey	·	2.9 km	MPC; JPL
229665	2006 MC_{2}	—	June 16, 2006	Kitt Peak	Spacewatch	VER	3.8 km	MPC; JPL
229666	2006 QF_{33}	—	August 23, 2006	Socorro	LINEAR	H	1 km	MPC; JPL
229667	2006 SQ_{182}	—	September 25, 2006	Mount Lemmon	Mount Lemmon Survey	·	1.8 km	MPC; JPL
229668	2006 SQ_{408}	—	September 30, 2006	Mount Lemmon	Mount Lemmon Survey	·	1.1 km	MPC; JPL
229669	2006 TF_{41}	—	October 12, 2006	Kitt Peak	Spacewatch	·	1.2 km	MPC; JPL
229670	2006 TP_{58}	—	October 12, 2006	Palomar	NEAT	H	610 m	MPC; JPL
229671	2006 VT_{87}	—	November 14, 2006	Catalina	CSS	·	930 m	MPC; JPL
229672	2006 WR_{1}	—	November 18, 2006	Kitt Peak	Spacewatch	APO +1km	930 m	MPC; JPL
229673	2006 WQ_{123}	—	November 21, 2006	Mount Lemmon	Mount Lemmon Survey	·	920 m	MPC; JPL
229674	2006 YK_{23}	—	December 21, 2006	Kitt Peak	Spacewatch	·	830 m	MPC; JPL
229675	2007 BH_{2}	—	January 16, 2007	Catalina	CSS	·	1.2 km	MPC; JPL
229676	2007 BR_{4}	—	January 16, 2007	Catalina	CSS	·	1.0 km	MPC; JPL
229677	2007 BY_{19}	—	January 23, 2007	Socorro	LINEAR	·	1.0 km	MPC; JPL
229678	2007 BY_{21}	—	January 24, 2007	Socorro	LINEAR	·	890 m	MPC; JPL
229679	2007 BO_{69}	—	January 27, 2007	Mount Lemmon	Mount Lemmon Survey	BAP	1.1 km	MPC; JPL
229680	2007 CX_{11}	—	February 6, 2007	Palomar	NEAT	·	1.5 km	MPC; JPL
229681	2007 CL_{52}	—	February 10, 2007	Catalina	CSS	·	1.1 km	MPC; JPL
229682	2007 CN_{52}	—	February 10, 2007	Catalina	CSS	·	1.8 km	MPC; JPL
229683	2007 CR_{62}	—	February 15, 2007	Palomar	NEAT	·	1.3 km	MPC; JPL
229684	2007 DQ_{11}	—	February 20, 2007	Vicques	M. Ory	·	1.3 km	MPC; JPL
229685	2007 DK_{25}	—	February 17, 2007	Kitt Peak	Spacewatch	·	1.5 km	MPC; JPL
229686	2007 DP_{36}	—	February 17, 2007	Kitt Peak	Spacewatch	MIS	3.2 km	MPC; JPL
229687	2007 DO_{48}	—	February 21, 2007	Mount Lemmon	Mount Lemmon Survey	NYS	1.1 km	MPC; JPL
229688	2007 DL_{51}	—	February 17, 2007	Kitt Peak	Spacewatch	NYS	1.5 km	MPC; JPL
229689	2007 DQ_{57}	—	February 21, 2007	Socorro	LINEAR	NYS	1.6 km	MPC; JPL
229690	2007 DS_{70}	—	February 21, 2007	Kitt Peak	Spacewatch	·	2.4 km	MPC; JPL
229691	2007 DX_{78}	—	February 23, 2007	Kitt Peak	Spacewatch	·	910 m	MPC; JPL
229692	2007 DP_{82}	—	February 23, 2007	Mount Lemmon	Mount Lemmon Survey	MAS	730 m	MPC; JPL
229693	2007 DC_{88}	—	February 23, 2007	Kitt Peak	Spacewatch	·	1.0 km	MPC; JPL
229694	2007 DE_{97}	—	February 23, 2007	Kitt Peak	Spacewatch	·	2.4 km	MPC; JPL
229695	2007 DH_{105}	—	February 26, 2007	Mount Lemmon	Mount Lemmon Survey	NEM	3.5 km	MPC; JPL
229696	2007 DT_{106}	—	February 22, 2007	Catalina	CSS	·	1.2 km	MPC; JPL
229697	2007 EZ_{12}	—	March 9, 2007	Palomar	NEAT	·	1.3 km	MPC; JPL
229698	2007 EL_{16}	—	March 9, 2007	Catalina	CSS	·	1.4 km	MPC; JPL
229699	2007 EW_{25}	—	March 10, 2007	Palomar	NEAT	·	2.8 km	MPC; JPL
229700	2007 EQ_{29}	—	March 9, 2007	Palomar	NEAT	·	1.2 km	MPC; JPL

== 229701–229800 ==
back to top

Designation			Discovery			Properties		Ref
Permanent	Provisional	Named after	Date	Site	Discoverer(s)	Category	Diam.	Ref
229701	2007 EP_{41}	—	March 9, 2007	Mount Lemmon	Mount Lemmon Survey	·	1.2 km	MPC; JPL
229702	2007 EO_{48}	—	March 9, 2007	Kitt Peak	Spacewatch	KOR	2.2 km	MPC; JPL
229703	2007 EP_{69}	—	March 10, 2007	Kitt Peak	Spacewatch	NYS	1.3 km	MPC; JPL
229704	2007 EJ_{76}	—	March 10, 2007	Kitt Peak	Spacewatch	NYS	1.2 km	MPC; JPL
229705	2007 EX_{78}	—	March 10, 2007	Palomar	NEAT	·	1.1 km	MPC; JPL
229706	2007 EV_{85}	—	March 12, 2007	Catalina	CSS	KON	3.1 km	MPC; JPL
229707	2007 EE_{117}	—	March 13, 2007	Mount Lemmon	Mount Lemmon Survey	·	2.5 km	MPC; JPL
229708	2007 ED_{119}	—	March 13, 2007	Mount Lemmon	Mount Lemmon Survey	EUN	1.8 km	MPC; JPL
229709	2007 EZ_{119}	—	March 13, 2007	Mount Lemmon	Mount Lemmon Survey	·	1.7 km	MPC; JPL
229710	2007 ET_{120}	—	March 14, 2007	Anderson Mesa	LONEOS	·	1.8 km	MPC; JPL
229711	2007 EH_{133}	—	March 9, 2007	Mount Lemmon	Mount Lemmon Survey	·	1.9 km	MPC; JPL
229712	2007 EZ_{133}	—	March 9, 2007	Mount Lemmon	Mount Lemmon Survey	NYS	930 m	MPC; JPL
229713	2007 EJ_{141}	—	March 12, 2007	Kitt Peak	Spacewatch	·	2.0 km	MPC; JPL
229714	2007 EH_{147}	—	March 12, 2007	Mount Lemmon	Mount Lemmon Survey	·	1.6 km	MPC; JPL
229715	2007 EY_{167}	—	March 13, 2007	Kitt Peak	Spacewatch	NYS	980 m	MPC; JPL
229716	2007 ER_{169}	—	March 13, 2007	Mount Lemmon	Mount Lemmon Survey	MAS	720 m	MPC; JPL
229717	2007 EC_{172}	—	March 14, 2007	Kitt Peak	Spacewatch	·	5.8 km	MPC; JPL
229718	2007 EA_{179}	—	March 14, 2007	Kitt Peak	Spacewatch	·	1.3 km	MPC; JPL
229719	2007 EN_{210}	—	March 8, 2007	Palomar	NEAT	·	1.1 km	MPC; JPL
229720	2007 EK_{219}	—	March 15, 2007	Kitt Peak	Spacewatch	·	2.2 km	MPC; JPL
229721	2007 FC_{38}	—	March 26, 2007	Kitt Peak	Spacewatch	·	1.6 km	MPC; JPL
229722	2007 GE	—	April 6, 2007	Vicques	M. Ory	·	2.1 km	MPC; JPL
229723 Marcoludwig	2007 GG_{2}	Marcoludwig	April 11, 2007	Altschwendt	W. Ries	·	2.7 km	MPC; JPL
229724	2007 GQ_{7}	—	April 7, 2007	Mount Lemmon	Mount Lemmon Survey	·	1.2 km	MPC; JPL
229725	2007 GX_{16}	—	April 11, 2007	Kitt Peak	Spacewatch	·	2.9 km	MPC; JPL
229726	2007 GH_{17}	—	April 11, 2007	Kitt Peak	Spacewatch	·	2.7 km	MPC; JPL
229727	2007 GZ_{19}	—	April 11, 2007	Kitt Peak	Spacewatch	·	1.3 km	MPC; JPL
229728	2007 GX_{30}	—	April 14, 2007	Mount Lemmon	Mount Lemmon Survey	·	1.8 km	MPC; JPL
229729	2007 GB_{35}	—	April 14, 2007	Kitt Peak	Spacewatch	·	1.8 km	MPC; JPL
229730	2007 GP_{37}	—	April 14, 2007	Kitt Peak	Spacewatch	MAS	770 m	MPC; JPL
229731	2007 GN_{42}	—	April 14, 2007	Kitt Peak	Spacewatch	·	3.2 km	MPC; JPL
229732	2007 GY_{47}	—	April 14, 2007	Kitt Peak	Spacewatch	EOS	2.2 km	MPC; JPL
229733	2007 GK_{53}	—	April 14, 2007	Mount Lemmon	Mount Lemmon Survey	·	1.9 km	MPC; JPL
229734	2007 GT_{53}	—	April 14, 2007	Kitt Peak	Spacewatch	·	2.4 km	MPC; JPL
229735	2007 HK_{1}	—	April 16, 2007	Catalina	CSS	·	2.1 km	MPC; JPL
229736	2007 HK_{3}	—	April 16, 2007	Catalina	CSS	EUN	1.9 km	MPC; JPL
229737 Porthos	2007 HO_{4}	Porthos	April 19, 2007	Saint-Sulpice	B. Christophe	·	2.6 km	MPC; JPL
229738	2007 HW_{21}	—	April 18, 2007	Kitt Peak	Spacewatch	·	1.2 km	MPC; JPL
229739	2007 HB_{22}	—	April 18, 2007	Kitt Peak	Spacewatch	·	2.8 km	MPC; JPL
229740	2007 HO_{53}	—	April 20, 2007	Kitt Peak	Spacewatch	·	3.5 km	MPC; JPL
229741	2007 HM_{58}	—	April 23, 2007	Catalina	CSS	·	3.4 km	MPC; JPL
229742	2007 HV_{82}	—	April 22, 2007	Catalina	CSS	V	1.0 km	MPC; JPL
229743	2007 JA_{5}	—	May 7, 2007	XuYi	PMO NEO Survey Program	·	7.0 km	MPC; JPL
229744	2007 JQ_{8}	—	May 9, 2007	Mount Lemmon	Mount Lemmon Survey	KOR	2.0 km	MPC; JPL
229745	2007 JA_{15}	—	May 10, 2007	Mount Lemmon	Mount Lemmon Survey	KOR	1.7 km	MPC; JPL
229746	2007 JF_{17}	—	May 7, 2007	Kitt Peak	Spacewatch	KOR	2.5 km	MPC; JPL
229747	2007 JV_{18}	—	May 9, 2007	Kitt Peak	Spacewatch	·	3.2 km	MPC; JPL
229748	2007 JZ_{19}	—	May 10, 2007	Mount Lemmon	Mount Lemmon Survey	·	2.1 km	MPC; JPL
229749	2007 JH_{21}	—	May 11, 2007	Siding Spring	SSS	·	3.2 km	MPC; JPL
229750	2007 JC_{23}	—	May 13, 2007	Tiki	S. F. Hönig, Teamo, N.	·	3.0 km	MPC; JPL
229751	2007 JK_{27}	—	May 9, 2007	Kitt Peak	Spacewatch	·	5.8 km	MPC; JPL
229752	2007 JL_{36}	—	May 14, 2007	Tiki	S. F. Hönig, Teamo, N.	NEM	3.1 km	MPC; JPL
229753	2007 KA_{4}	—	May 23, 2007	7300	W. K. Y. Yeung	·	3.8 km	MPC; JPL
229754	2007 KO_{6}	—	May 25, 2007	Mount Lemmon	Mount Lemmon Survey	(5)	1.7 km	MPC; JPL
229755	2007 LW_{3}	—	June 8, 2007	Kitt Peak	Spacewatch	·	3.5 km	MPC; JPL
229756	2007 LC_{8}	—	June 9, 2007	Kitt Peak	Spacewatch	·	5.0 km	MPC; JPL
229757	2007 MU_{9}	—	June 19, 2007	Kitt Peak	Spacewatch	·	1.5 km	MPC; JPL
229758	2007 NG	—	July 7, 2007	Sandlot	G. Hug	·	3.0 km	MPC; JPL
229759	2007 NZ_{2}	—	July 14, 2007	Tiki	S. F. Hönig, Teamo, N.	·	3.2 km	MPC; JPL
229760	2007 RM_{225}	—	September 10, 2007	Kitt Peak	Spacewatch	L4	10 km	MPC; JPL
229761	2007 RC_{288}	—	September 11, 2007	Mount Lemmon	Mount Lemmon Survey	L4	9.6 km	MPC; JPL
229762 Gǃkúnǁʼhòmdímà	2007 UK_{126}	Gǃkúnǁʼhòmdímà	October 19, 2007	Palomar	M. E. Schwamb, M. E. Brown, D. L. Rabinowitz	SDO · moon	614 km	MPC; JPL
229763	2008 FZ_{52}	—	March 28, 2008	Kitt Peak	Spacewatch	·	890 m	MPC; JPL
229764	2008 FE_{88}	—	March 28, 2008	Mount Lemmon	Mount Lemmon Survey	V	860 m	MPC; JPL
229765	2008 FT_{95}	—	March 29, 2008	Mount Lemmon	Mount Lemmon Survey	MAS	1.1 km	MPC; JPL
229766	2008 GX_{76}	—	April 7, 2008	Kitt Peak	Spacewatch	·	1.0 km	MPC; JPL
229767	2008 HA_{33}	—	April 29, 2008	Mount Lemmon	Mount Lemmon Survey	·	890 m	MPC; JPL
229768	2008 HT_{68}	—	April 26, 2008	Kitt Peak	Spacewatch	·	960 m	MPC; JPL
229769	2008 JX_{19}	—	May 6, 2008	Reedy Creek	J. Broughton	·	3.0 km	MPC; JPL
229770	2008 JX_{30}	—	May 3, 2008	Mount Lemmon	Mount Lemmon Survey	(5)	1.6 km	MPC; JPL
229771	2008 JQ_{32}	—	May 7, 2008	Kitt Peak	Spacewatch	·	830 m	MPC; JPL
229772	2008 KX_{10}	—	May 29, 2008	Mount Lemmon	Mount Lemmon Survey	·	2.0 km	MPC; JPL
229773	2008 LW_{10}	—	June 6, 2008	Kitt Peak	Spacewatch	·	1.7 km	MPC; JPL
229774	2008 LY_{14}	—	June 8, 2008	Kitt Peak	Spacewatch	·	4.9 km	MPC; JPL
229775	2008 LM_{15}	—	June 9, 2008	Kitt Peak	Spacewatch	(5)	2.0 km	MPC; JPL
229776	2008 ME_{2}	—	June 24, 2008	Kitt Peak	Spacewatch	V	760 m	MPC; JPL
229777 ENIAC	2008 MX_{4}	ENIAC	June 28, 2008	La Cañada	Lacruz, J.	·	2.9 km	MPC; JPL
229778	2008 NX_{4}	—	July 10, 2008	Siding Spring	SSS	·	3.4 km	MPC; JPL
229779	2008 ON_{20}	—	July 29, 2008	Kitt Peak	Spacewatch	HOF	3.0 km	MPC; JPL
229780	2008 OJ_{21}	—	July 30, 2008	Mount Lemmon	Mount Lemmon Survey	KOR	2.0 km	MPC; JPL
229781 Arthurmcdonald	2008 PS_{1}	Arthurmcdonald	August 3, 2008	Vallemare Borbona	V. S. Casulli	·	5.5 km	MPC; JPL
229782	2008 PZ_{3}	—	August 4, 2008	Dauban	Kugel, F.	·	2.1 km	MPC; JPL
229783	2008 PG_{17}	—	August 11, 2008	La Sagra	OAM	VER	3.9 km	MPC; JPL
229784	2008 PM_{18}	—	August 13, 2008	Siding Spring	SSS	·	3.0 km	MPC; JPL
229785	2008 QR_{2}	—	August 23, 2008	Marly	P. Kocher	·	3.4 km	MPC; JPL
229786	2008 QU_{8}	—	August 25, 2008	La Sagra	OAM	THM	3.0 km	MPC; JPL
229787	2008 QV_{22}	—	August 26, 2008	Socorro	LINEAR	EOS	2.8 km	MPC; JPL
229788	2008 QV_{41}	—	August 24, 2008	Kitt Peak	Spacewatch	·	1.9 km	MPC; JPL
229789	2008 RH_{10}	—	September 3, 2008	Kitt Peak	Spacewatch	·	7.0 km	MPC; JPL
229790	2008 RH_{30}	—	September 2, 2008	Kitt Peak	Spacewatch	MAS	1.1 km	MPC; JPL
229791	2008 RP_{43}	—	September 2, 2008	Kitt Peak	Spacewatch	THM	3.6 km	MPC; JPL
229792	2008 RD_{79}	—	September 9, 2008	Bergisch Gladbach	W. Bickel	·	2.6 km	MPC; JPL
229793	2008 RB_{90}	—	September 5, 2008	Kitt Peak	Spacewatch	WIT	1.4 km	MPC; JPL
229794	2008 RR_{99}	—	September 2, 2008	Kitt Peak	Spacewatch	KOR	1.6 km	MPC; JPL
229795	2008 RM_{100}	—	September 3, 2008	Kitt Peak	Spacewatch	T_{j} (2.99) · HIL · 3:2	5.9 km	MPC; JPL
229796	2008 RC_{122}	—	September 3, 2008	Kitt Peak	Spacewatch	·	3.0 km	MPC; JPL
229797	2008 RT_{130}	—	September 8, 2008	Catalina	CSS	·	5.4 km	MPC; JPL
229798	2008 SK_{15}	—	September 19, 2008	Kitt Peak	Spacewatch	·	2.9 km	MPC; JPL
229799	2008 SN_{18}	—	September 19, 2008	Kitt Peak	Spacewatch	·	3.1 km	MPC; JPL
229800	2008 ST_{35}	—	September 20, 2008	Kitt Peak	Spacewatch	·	2.5 km	MPC; JPL

== 229801–229900 ==
back to top

Designation			Discovery			Properties		Ref
Permanent	Provisional	Named after	Date	Site	Discoverer(s)	Category	Diam.	Ref
229801	2008 SN_{37}	—	September 20, 2008	Kitt Peak	Spacewatch	·	2.6 km	MPC; JPL
229802	2008 SP_{51}	—	September 20, 2008	Kitt Peak	Spacewatch	HYG	3.6 km	MPC; JPL
229803	2008 SL_{57}	—	September 20, 2008	Mount Lemmon	Mount Lemmon Survey	·	2.8 km	MPC; JPL
229804	2008 SO_{60}	—	September 20, 2008	Catalina	CSS	·	5.5 km	MPC; JPL
229805	2008 SC_{69}	—	September 22, 2008	Kitt Peak	Spacewatch	·	2.4 km	MPC; JPL
229806	2008 SX_{112}	—	September 22, 2008	Kitt Peak	Spacewatch	·	2.8 km	MPC; JPL
229807	2008 ST_{145}	—	September 21, 2008	Catalina	CSS	·	2.4 km	MPC; JPL
229808	2008 SB_{148}	—	September 26, 2008	Kitt Peak	Spacewatch	L4	14 km	MPC; JPL
229809	2008 SA_{164}	—	September 28, 2008	Socorro	LINEAR	L4	10 km	MPC; JPL
229810	2008 SE_{164}	—	September 28, 2008	Socorro	LINEAR	THM	3.2 km	MPC; JPL
229811	2008 ST_{187}	—	September 25, 2008	Kitt Peak	Spacewatch	L4	10 km	MPC; JPL
229812	2008 SC_{201}	—	September 26, 2008	Kitt Peak	Spacewatch	·	2.4 km	MPC; JPL
229813	2008 SW_{223}	—	September 25, 2008	Mount Lemmon	Mount Lemmon Survey	L4	10 km	MPC; JPL
229814	2008 SQ_{246}	—	September 30, 2008	La Sagra	OAM	KOR	1.9 km	MPC; JPL
229815	2008 SX_{256}	—	September 21, 2008	Catalina	CSS	·	6.3 km	MPC; JPL
229816	2008 SY_{261}	—	September 24, 2008	Kitt Peak	Spacewatch	L4	9.0 km	MPC; JPL
229817	2008 SK_{285}	—	September 20, 2008	Kitt Peak	Spacewatch	AST	3.6 km	MPC; JPL
229818	2008 TP_{4}	—	October 1, 2008	La Sagra	OAM	·	2.3 km	MPC; JPL
229819	2008 TK_{13}	—	October 1, 2008	Mount Lemmon	Mount Lemmon Survey	·	2.5 km	MPC; JPL
229820	2008 TA_{84}	—	October 3, 2008	Kitt Peak	Spacewatch	·	2.8 km	MPC; JPL
229821	2008 TQ_{105}	—	October 6, 2008	Kitt Peak	Spacewatch	·	2.6 km	MPC; JPL
229822	2008 TA_{112}	—	October 6, 2008	Catalina	CSS	L4	14 km	MPC; JPL
229823	2008 TA_{152}	—	October 9, 2008	Mount Lemmon	Mount Lemmon Survey	·	2.7 km	MPC; JPL
229824	2008 UQ_{1}	—	October 21, 2008	Goodricke-Pigott	R. A. Tucker	·	5.8 km	MPC; JPL
229825	2008 UB_{5}	—	October 25, 2008	Wildberg	R. Apitzsch	·	5.3 km	MPC; JPL
229826	2008 UK_{8}	—	October 17, 2008	Kitt Peak	Spacewatch	L4	10 km	MPC; JPL
229827	2008 UC_{56}	—	October 21, 2008	Kitt Peak	Spacewatch	KOR	1.7 km	MPC; JPL
229828	2008 UH_{124}	—	October 22, 2008	Kitt Peak	Spacewatch	·	5.7 km	MPC; JPL
229829	2008 UG_{134}	—	October 23, 2008	Kitt Peak	Spacewatch	·	5.1 km	MPC; JPL
229830	2008 US_{357}	—	October 24, 2008	Catalina	CSS	EOS	2.9 km	MPC; JPL
229831	2008 VH_{72}	—	November 3, 2008	Mount Lemmon	Mount Lemmon Survey	MAR	1.6 km	MPC; JPL
229832	2008 WQ_{33}	—	November 17, 2008	Kitt Peak	Spacewatch	L4	8.7 km	MPC; JPL
229833	2009 BQ_{25}	—	January 16, 2009	Kitt Peak	Spacewatch	·	660 m	MPC; JPL
229834	2009 FM_{59}	—	March 26, 2009	Kitt Peak	Spacewatch	KOR	2.1 km	MPC; JPL
229835	2009 QA_{31}	—	August 24, 2009	La Sagra	OAM	·	1.0 km	MPC; JPL
229836 Wladimarinello	2009 QR_{34}	Wladimarinello	August 28, 2009	Lumezzane	M. Micheli, Pizzetti, G. P.	·	2.4 km	MPC; JPL
229837	2009 RL_{10}	—	September 12, 2009	Kitt Peak	Spacewatch	·	2.0 km	MPC; JPL
229838	2009 RV_{16}	—	September 12, 2009	Kitt Peak	Spacewatch	·	2.4 km	MPC; JPL
229839	2009 SB_{46}	—	September 16, 2009	Kitt Peak	Spacewatch	·	1.7 km	MPC; JPL
229840	2009 SF_{99}	—	September 22, 2009	Dauban	Kugel, F.	·	3.7 km	MPC; JPL
229841	2009 SO_{114}	—	September 18, 2009	Kitt Peak	Spacewatch	·	1.2 km	MPC; JPL
229842	2009 SF_{143}	—	September 19, 2009	Kitt Peak	Spacewatch	·	2.8 km	MPC; JPL
229843	2009 SF_{147}	—	September 19, 2009	Kitt Peak	Spacewatch	·	930 m	MPC; JPL
229844	2009 ST_{204}	—	September 22, 2009	Kitt Peak	Spacewatch	NYS	980 m	MPC; JPL
229845	2009 ST_{229}	—	September 16, 2009	Kitt Peak	Spacewatch	AGN	1.6 km	MPC; JPL
229846	2009 SZ_{230}	—	September 17, 2009	Mount Lemmon	Mount Lemmon Survey	MRX	1.2 km	MPC; JPL
229847	2009 SR_{234}	—	September 16, 2009	Mount Lemmon	Mount Lemmon Survey	·	2.8 km	MPC; JPL
229848	2009 SW_{251}	—	September 20, 2009	Mount Lemmon	Mount Lemmon Survey	·	1.4 km	MPC; JPL
229849	2009 SK_{253}	—	September 23, 2009	Kitt Peak	Spacewatch	MAS	740 m	MPC; JPL
229850	2009 SP_{255}	—	September 20, 2009	Catalina	CSS	H	850 m	MPC; JPL
229851	2009 SQ_{267}	—	September 23, 2009	Mount Lemmon	Mount Lemmon Survey	L4	17 km	MPC; JPL
229852	2009 SH_{275}	—	September 25, 2009	Kitt Peak	Spacewatch	·	1.3 km	MPC; JPL
229853	2009 SN_{275}	—	September 25, 2009	Kitt Peak	Spacewatch	·	2.5 km	MPC; JPL
229854	2009 SD_{276}	—	September 25, 2009	Kitt Peak	Spacewatch	·	2.1 km	MPC; JPL
229855	2009 ST_{288}	—	September 25, 2009	Catalina	CSS	EOS	2.8 km	MPC; JPL
229856	2009 SU_{339}	—	September 22, 2009	Mount Lemmon	Mount Lemmon Survey	·	3.6 km	MPC; JPL
229857	2009 SM_{346}	—	September 20, 2009	Mount Lemmon	Mount Lemmon Survey	·	2.4 km	MPC; JPL
229858	2009 TZ_{5}	—	October 11, 2009	La Sagra	OAM	·	5.5 km	MPC; JPL
229859	2009 TD_{6}	—	October 12, 2009	La Sagra	OAM	L4	14 km	MPC; JPL
229860	2009 TA_{12}	—	October 14, 2009	Bergisch Gladbach	W. Bickel	EUN	1.5 km	MPC; JPL
229861	2009 TL_{17}	—	October 15, 2009	La Sagra	OAM	·	4.7 km	MPC; JPL
229862	2009 TY_{17}	—	October 15, 2009	Catalina	CSS	·	7.2 km	MPC; JPL
229863	2009 TC_{20}	—	October 11, 2009	Mount Lemmon	Mount Lemmon Survey	·	2.9 km	MPC; JPL
229864 Sichouzhilu	2009 TC_{26}	Sichouzhilu	October 14, 2009	XuYi	PMO NEO Survey Program	·	5.7 km	MPC; JPL
229865	2009 TQ_{26}	—	October 14, 2009	La Sagra	OAM	BAP	1.5 km	MPC; JPL
229866	2009 TV_{27}	—	October 15, 2009	La Sagra	OAM	·	5.4 km	MPC; JPL
229867	2009 TS_{29}	—	October 15, 2009	Mount Lemmon	Mount Lemmon Survey	·	3.2 km	MPC; JPL
229868	2009 TS_{35}	—	October 14, 2009	La Sagra	OAM	·	3.8 km	MPC; JPL
229869	2009 UZ_{4}	—	October 20, 2009	Mayhill	Lowe, A.	·	3.3 km	MPC; JPL
229870	2009 UD_{12}	—	October 17, 2009	La Sagra	OAM	·	3.1 km	MPC; JPL
229871	2009 UO_{26}	—	October 21, 2009	Catalina	CSS	·	1.9 km	MPC; JPL
229872	2009 UB_{30}	—	October 18, 2009	Mount Lemmon	Mount Lemmon Survey	HYG	3.2 km	MPC; JPL
229873	2009 UD_{30}	—	October 18, 2009	Mount Lemmon	Mount Lemmon Survey	·	3.6 km	MPC; JPL
229874	2009 UC_{31}	—	October 18, 2009	Mount Lemmon	Mount Lemmon Survey	·	3.5 km	MPC; JPL
229875	2009 UR_{33}	—	October 18, 2009	Mount Lemmon	Mount Lemmon Survey	·	4.2 km	MPC; JPL
229876	2009 UT_{34}	—	October 21, 2009	Mount Lemmon	Mount Lemmon Survey	·	6.6 km	MPC; JPL
229877	2009 UR_{35}	—	October 21, 2009	Mount Lemmon	Mount Lemmon Survey	·	1.8 km	MPC; JPL
229878	2009 UE_{40}	—	October 18, 2009	La Sagra	OAM	L4	10 km	MPC; JPL
229879	2009 UZ_{46}	—	October 18, 2009	Mount Lemmon	Mount Lemmon Survey	·	4.6 km	MPC; JPL
229880	2009 UM_{71}	—	October 22, 2009	Catalina	CSS	·	6.3 km	MPC; JPL
229881	2009 US_{71}	—	October 22, 2009	Mount Lemmon	Mount Lemmon Survey	·	2.2 km	MPC; JPL
229882	2009 UT_{71}	—	October 22, 2009	Mount Lemmon	Mount Lemmon Survey	·	2.9 km	MPC; JPL
229883	2009 UV_{72}	—	October 23, 2009	Mount Lemmon	Mount Lemmon Survey	·	4.1 km	MPC; JPL
229884	2009 UL_{82}	—	October 23, 2009	Mount Lemmon	Mount Lemmon Survey	·	2.7 km	MPC; JPL
229885	2009 UV_{82}	—	October 23, 2009	Mount Lemmon	Mount Lemmon Survey	·	1.6 km	MPC; JPL
229886	2009 UZ_{84}	—	October 23, 2009	Mount Lemmon	Mount Lemmon Survey	AGN	1.7 km	MPC; JPL
229887	2009 UA_{85}	—	October 23, 2009	Mount Lemmon	Mount Lemmon Survey	·	3.5 km	MPC; JPL
229888	2009 UZ_{88}	—	October 24, 2009	Catalina	CSS	·	1.1 km	MPC; JPL
229889	2009 UX_{102}	—	October 24, 2009	Catalina	CSS	·	4.9 km	MPC; JPL
229890	2009 UH_{110}	—	October 23, 2009	Kitt Peak	Spacewatch	NYS	1.0 km	MPC; JPL
229891	2009 UF_{111}	—	October 23, 2009	Kitt Peak	Spacewatch	·	3.6 km	MPC; JPL
229892	2009 UW_{127}	—	October 28, 2009	Bisei SG Center	BATTeRS	·	2.6 km	MPC; JPL
229893	2009 UJ_{128}	—	October 26, 2009	Kitt Peak	Spacewatch	·	2.8 km	MPC; JPL
229894	2009 UC_{130}	—	October 29, 2009	La Sagra	OAM	·	4.4 km	MPC; JPL
229895	2009 VK_{1}	—	November 9, 2009	Mayhill	Mayhill	·	1.7 km	MPC; JPL
229896	2009 VE_{3}	—	November 10, 2009	Mayhill	Mayhill	·	1.1 km	MPC; JPL
229897	2009 VL_{22}	—	November 9, 2009	Mount Lemmon	Mount Lemmon Survey	·	3.9 km	MPC; JPL
229898	2009 VG_{23}	—	November 9, 2009	Mount Lemmon	Mount Lemmon Survey	·	1.2 km	MPC; JPL
229899	2009 VW_{25}	—	November 11, 2009	Tzec Maun	Tozzi, F.	·	4.3 km	MPC; JPL
229900 Emmagreaves	2009 VO_{42}	Emmagreaves	November 14, 2009	Mayhill	Falla, N.	·	2.0 km	MPC; JPL

== 229901–230000 ==
back to top

Designation			Discovery			Properties		Ref
Permanent	Provisional	Named after	Date	Site	Discoverer(s)	Category	Diam.	Ref
229901	2009 VD_{61}	—	November 8, 2009	Kitt Peak	Spacewatch	·	3.4 km	MPC; JPL
229902	2009 VA_{81}	—	November 15, 2009	Catalina	CSS	L4	12 km	MPC; JPL
229903	2009 WH_{14}	—	November 16, 2009	Mount Lemmon	Mount Lemmon Survey	·	3.3 km	MPC; JPL
229904	2009 WO_{19}	—	November 17, 2009	Mount Lemmon	Mount Lemmon Survey	·	5.0 km	MPC; JPL
229905	2009 WC_{33}	—	November 16, 2009	Kitt Peak	Spacewatch	·	3.1 km	MPC; JPL
229906	2009 WE_{85}	—	November 19, 2009	Kitt Peak	Spacewatch	·	5.0 km	MPC; JPL
229907	4513 P-L	—	September 24, 1960	Palomar	C. J. van Houten, I. van Houten-Groeneveld, T. Gehrels	·	2.0 km	MPC; JPL
229908	6005 P-L	—	September 24, 1960	Palomar	C. J. van Houten, I. van Houten-Groeneveld, T. Gehrels	MAS	790 m	MPC; JPL
229909	6201 P-L	—	September 24, 1960	Palomar	C. J. van Houten, I. van Houten-Groeneveld, T. Gehrels	·	660 m	MPC; JPL
229910	6798 P-L	—	September 24, 1960	Palomar	C. J. van Houten, I. van Houten-Groeneveld, T. Gehrels	·	1.9 km	MPC; JPL
229911	2107 T-3	—	October 16, 1977	Palomar	C. J. van Houten, I. van Houten-Groeneveld, T. Gehrels	·	2.7 km	MPC; JPL
229912	4378 T-3	—	October 16, 1977	Palomar	C. J. van Houten, I. van Houten-Groeneveld, T. Gehrels	NEM	2.7 km	MPC; JPL
229913	4503 T-3	—	October 16, 1977	Palomar	C. J. van Houten, I. van Houten-Groeneveld, T. Gehrels	·	1.1 km	MPC; JPL
229914	5104 T-3	—	October 16, 1977	Palomar	C. J. van Houten, I. van Houten-Groeneveld, T. Gehrels	EOS	3.5 km	MPC; JPL
229915	1990 SH	—	September 17, 1990	Siding Spring	R. H. McNaught	·	3.6 km	MPC; JPL
229916	1995 CA_{4}	—	February 1, 1995	Kitt Peak	Spacewatch	NYS	1.5 km	MPC; JPL
229917	1995 CQ_{7}	—	February 1, 1995	Kitt Peak	Spacewatch	NYS	1.7 km	MPC; JPL
229918	1995 CJ_{10}	—	February 4, 1995	Kitt Peak	Spacewatch	·	2.7 km	MPC; JPL
229919	1995 FN_{5}	—	March 23, 1995	Kitt Peak	Spacewatch	·	1.4 km	MPC; JPL
229920	1995 FB_{19}	—	March 29, 1995	Kitt Peak	Spacewatch	·	2.1 km	MPC; JPL
229921	1995 SC_{43}	—	September 25, 1995	Kitt Peak	Spacewatch	·	2.1 km	MPC; JPL
229922	1995 ST_{60}	—	September 25, 1995	Kitt Peak	Spacewatch	·	2.1 km	MPC; JPL
229923	1995 UQ_{40}	—	October 23, 1995	Kitt Peak	Spacewatch	·	840 m	MPC; JPL
229924	1995 UA_{59}	—	October 18, 1995	Kitt Peak	Spacewatch	·	2.2 km	MPC; JPL
229925	1996 EM_{11}	—	March 12, 1996	Kitt Peak	Spacewatch	(2076)	1.4 km	MPC; JPL
229926	1996 FB_{11}	—	March 21, 1996	Kitt Peak	Spacewatch	NYS	1.2 km	MPC; JPL
229927	1996 TN_{9}	—	October 13, 1996	Sudbury	D. di Cicco	·	3.4 km	MPC; JPL
229928	1997 AB_{21}	—	January 11, 1997	Kitt Peak	Spacewatch	·	1.9 km	MPC; JPL
229929	1997 GL_{5}	—	April 8, 1997	Kitt Peak	Spacewatch	·	2.3 km	MPC; JPL
229930	1997 ST_{16}	—	September 28, 1997	Kitt Peak	Spacewatch	·	1.6 km	MPC; JPL
229931	1997 SL_{31}	—	September 28, 1997	Kitt Peak	Spacewatch	THM	2.7 km	MPC; JPL
229932	1997 TY_{1}	—	October 3, 1997	Caussols	ODAS	·	2.1 km	MPC; JPL
229933	1997 TG_{27}	—	October 4, 1997	Caussols	ODAS	NYS	1.7 km	MPC; JPL
229934	1998 BS_{22}	—	January 23, 1998	Kitt Peak	Spacewatch	·	2.1 km	MPC; JPL
229935	1998 KB_{43}	—	May 28, 1998	Kitt Peak	Spacewatch	·	3.7 km	MPC; JPL
229936	1998 QL_{21}	—	August 17, 1998	Socorro	LINEAR	V	940 m	MPC; JPL
229937	1998 RZ_{6}	—	September 12, 1998	Kitt Peak	Spacewatch	·	3.1 km	MPC; JPL
229938	1998 SJ_{87}	—	September 26, 1998	Socorro	LINEAR	(2076)	1.0 km	MPC; JPL
229939	1998 SM_{95}	—	September 26, 1998	Socorro	LINEAR	V	1.0 km	MPC; JPL
229940	1998 SU_{115}	—	September 26, 1998	Socorro	LINEAR	·	1.3 km	MPC; JPL
229941	1998 SV_{152}	—	September 26, 1998	Socorro	LINEAR	·	1.1 km	MPC; JPL
229942	1998 SJ_{173}	—	September 19, 1998	Apache Point	SDSS	KOR	1.7 km	MPC; JPL
229943	1998 TH	—	October 10, 1998	Oizumi	T. Kobayashi	·	1.2 km	MPC; JPL
229944	1998 UW	—	October 17, 1998	Catalina	CSS	PHO	1.7 km	MPC; JPL
229945	1998 US_{8}	—	October 17, 1998	Xinglong	SCAP	·	2.1 km	MPC; JPL
229946	1998 UZ_{9}	—	October 16, 1998	Kitt Peak	Spacewatch	MAS	770 m	MPC; JPL
229947	1998 VJ_{41}	—	November 14, 1998	Kitt Peak	Spacewatch	NYS	1.4 km	MPC; JPL
229948	1998 WC_{19}	—	November 21, 1998	Socorro	LINEAR	·	1.2 km	MPC; JPL
229949	1998 WV_{26}	—	November 16, 1998	Kitt Peak	Spacewatch	·	3.2 km	MPC; JPL
229950	1998 XD_{5}	—	December 12, 1998	Farra d'Isonzo	Farra d'Isonzo	·	1.9 km	MPC; JPL
229951	1998 XU_{21}	—	December 10, 1998	Kitt Peak	Spacewatch	HYG	4.0 km	MPC; JPL
229952	1998 XM_{25}	—	December 13, 1998	Kitt Peak	Spacewatch	·	2.2 km	MPC; JPL
229953	1998 YB_{17}	—	December 22, 1998	Kitt Peak	Spacewatch	·	3.1 km	MPC; JPL
229954	1999 BC_{5}	—	January 19, 1999	Caussols	ODAS	·	6.0 km	MPC; JPL
229955	1999 BS_{30}	—	January 19, 1999	Kitt Peak	Spacewatch	THM	2.7 km	MPC; JPL
229956	1999 CS_{115}	—	February 12, 1999	Socorro	LINEAR	·	5.5 km	MPC; JPL
229957	1999 KF_{7}	—	May 17, 1999	Socorro	LINEAR	BRG	2.4 km	MPC; JPL
229958	1999 RD_{43}	—	September 13, 1999	Siding Spring	R. H. McNaught	·	940 m	MPC; JPL
229959	1999 RV_{172}	—	September 9, 1999	Socorro	LINEAR	·	2.9 km	MPC; JPL
229960	1999 RP_{227}	—	September 7, 1999	Anderson Mesa	LONEOS	GEF	2.2 km	MPC; JPL
229961	1999 TS_{12}	—	October 12, 1999	Prescott	P. G. Comba	·	3.7 km	MPC; JPL
229962	1999 TS_{125}	—	October 4, 1999	Socorro	LINEAR	·	670 m	MPC; JPL
229963	1999 TX_{146}	—	October 7, 1999	Socorro	LINEAR	·	3.9 km	MPC; JPL
229964	1999 TA_{158}	—	October 7, 1999	Socorro	LINEAR	NEM	3.4 km	MPC; JPL
229965	1999 TY_{185}	—	October 12, 1999	Socorro	LINEAR	GEF	1.8 km	MPC; JPL
229966	1999 TH_{203}	—	October 13, 1999	Socorro	LINEAR	·	1.4 km	MPC; JPL
229967	1999 TU_{225}	—	October 2, 1999	Catalina	CSS	·	2.9 km	MPC; JPL
229968	1999 TB_{235}	—	October 3, 1999	Catalina	CSS	·	2.4 km	MPC; JPL
229969	1999 TN_{249}	—	October 9, 1999	Catalina	CSS	·	4.1 km	MPC; JPL
229970	1999 TR_{250}	—	October 9, 1999	Catalina	CSS	·	3.4 km	MPC; JPL
229971	1999 UX_{11}	—	October 29, 1999	Kitt Peak	Spacewatch	HOF	2.7 km	MPC; JPL
229972	1999 UO_{16}	—	October 29, 1999	Catalina	CSS	·	3.2 km	MPC; JPL
229973	1999 UX_{26}	—	October 30, 1999	Catalina	CSS	DOR	3.6 km	MPC; JPL
229974	1999 UR_{36}	—	October 16, 1999	Kitt Peak	Spacewatch	AGN	1.3 km	MPC; JPL
229975	1999 VC_{40}	—	November 12, 1999	Bergisch Gladbach	W. Bickel	·	2.5 km	MPC; JPL
229976	1999 VP_{55}	—	November 4, 1999	Socorro	LINEAR	·	2.4 km	MPC; JPL
229977	1999 VM_{62}	—	November 4, 1999	Socorro	LINEAR	AGN	1.7 km	MPC; JPL
229978	1999 VW_{119}	—	November 3, 1999	Kitt Peak	Spacewatch	·	2.6 km	MPC; JPL
229979	1999 VJ_{129}	—	November 11, 1999	Kitt Peak	Spacewatch	·	2.3 km	MPC; JPL
229980	1999 VV_{141}	—	November 10, 1999	Kitt Peak	Spacewatch	KOR	1.7 km	MPC; JPL
229981	1999 VC_{182}	—	November 9, 1999	Socorro	LINEAR	·	2.4 km	MPC; JPL
229982	1999 WG_{17}	—	November 30, 1999	Kitt Peak	Spacewatch	·	4.3 km	MPC; JPL
229983	1999 WU_{23}	—	November 17, 1999	Kitt Peak	Spacewatch	(13314)	3.0 km	MPC; JPL
229984	1999 XN_{63}	—	December 7, 1999	Socorro	LINEAR	·	2.0 km	MPC; JPL
229985	1999 XQ_{78}	—	December 7, 1999	Socorro	LINEAR	·	1.1 km	MPC; JPL
229986	1999 XZ_{121}	—	December 7, 1999	Catalina	CSS	·	850 m	MPC; JPL
229987	1999 XU_{194}	—	December 12, 1999	Socorro	LINEAR	·	2.5 km	MPC; JPL
229988	1999 XO_{225}	—	December 13, 1999	Kitt Peak	Spacewatch	·	930 m	MPC; JPL
229989	1999 YR_{2}	—	December 16, 1999	Kitt Peak	Spacewatch	·	1.0 km	MPC; JPL
229990	1999 YB_{15}	—	December 31, 1999	Kitt Peak	Spacewatch	·	3.7 km	MPC; JPL
229991	2000 AH_{207}	—	January 3, 2000	Kitt Peak	Spacewatch	·	1.2 km	MPC; JPL
229992	2000 AW_{207}	—	January 4, 2000	Kitt Peak	Spacewatch	EOS	2.7 km	MPC; JPL
229993	2000 AK_{218}	—	January 8, 2000	Kitt Peak	Spacewatch	·	1.6 km	MPC; JPL
229994	2000 BJ_{9}	—	January 26, 2000	Kitt Peak	Spacewatch	KOR	2.0 km	MPC; JPL
229995	2000 CE_{15}	—	February 2, 2000	Socorro	LINEAR	·	890 m	MPC; JPL
229996	2000 CS_{17}	—	February 2, 2000	Socorro	LINEAR	·	1.0 km	MPC; JPL
229997	2000 CU_{74}	—	February 8, 2000	Kitt Peak	Spacewatch	·	2.7 km	MPC; JPL
229998	2000 CG_{106}	—	February 5, 2000	Kitt Peak	M. W. Buie	L4	13 km	MPC; JPL
229999	2000 DG_{42}	—	February 29, 2000	Socorro	LINEAR	·	1.4 km	MPC; JPL
230000	2000 DW_{43}	—	February 29, 2000	Socorro	LINEAR	·	1.6 km	MPC; JPL

back to top

== See also ==
- Meanings of minor-planet names: 229001–230000
